= Basketball at the 1948 Summer Olympics – Men's team rosters =

Basketball

The following is the list of squads for each of the 23 teams that competed in the 1948 Summer Olympics, held in United Kingdom between 30 July and 13 August 1948. Each team selected a squad of 12 players for the tournament.

== Group A ==
=== Brazil ===
The following players represented Brazil:

Brazil men's national basketball team roster
Players
Coaches

Pos.	No.	Name	Age – Date of birth	Height	Club	Ctr.
		Algodão	23 – 1 March 1925
		João Francisco Bráz	27 – 25 November 1920
		Ruy de Freitas	31 – 24 August 1916
		Marcus Vinícius Dias	25 – 22 January 1923
		Affonso Évora	19 – 29 August 1928
		Alexandre Gemignani	23 – 26 June 1925
		Alfredo da Motta	27 – 12 January 1921
		Alberto Marson	23 – 24 February 1925
		Nilton Pacheco	28 – 26 July 1920
		Massinet Sorcinelli	26 – 27 February 1922

Head coach

- (Brazil) Moacyr Daiuto

Legend

- Club – describes last
  club before the competition
- Age – describes age
  on 30 July 1948

=== Canada ===
The following players represented Canada:

Canada men's national basketball team roster
Players
Coaches

Pos.	No.	Name	Age – Date of birth	Height	Club	Ctr.
	3	Bill Bell	–		University of British Columbia	(Canada)
	4	Mendy Morein	22 – 22 May 1926		YMHA Montreal	(Canada)
	5	Bennie Lands	27 – 22 February 1921		YMHA Montreal	(Canada)
	6	Bobby Scarr	21 – 13 August 1926		University of British Columbia	(Canada)
	7	Pat McGeer	21 – 29 June 1927		University of British Columbia	(Canada)
	8	Reid Mitchell	21 – 6 October 1926		University of British Columbia	(Canada)
	9	Sol Tolchinsky	19 – 2 January 1929		YMHA Montreal	(Canada)
	10	Harry Kermode	26 – 18 July 1922		University of British Columbia	(Canada)
	11	Nev Munro	21 – 22 July 1927		University of British Columbia	(Canada)
	12	Ole Bakken	26 – 24 May 1922		University of British Columbia	(Canada)
	13	Dave Campbell	22 – 11 September 1925		University of British Columbia	(Canada)
	14	Doodie Bloomfield	29 – 8 August 1918		YMHA Montreal	(Canada)
	15	Murray Waxman	23 – 10 July 1925		YMHA Montreal	(Canada)
	16	Sidney Strulovitch	23 – 20 June 1925		YMHA Montreal	(Canada)

Head coach

- (Canada) Bob Osborne

Legend

- Club – describes last
  club before the competition
- Age – describes age
  on 30 July 1948

=== Great Britain ===
The following players represented Great Britain:

Great Britain men's national basketball team roster
Players
Coaches

Pos.	No.	Name	Age – Date of birth	Height	Club	Ctr.
	3	Lionel Price	21 – 6 February 1927
	4	Robert Norris	23 – 20 August 1924
	5	Stanley Weston	25 – 16 May 1923
	6	Trevor Davies	35 – 19 August 1912
	7	Malcolm Finlay	–
	8	Colin Hunt	–
	9	Frank Cole	–
	10	Douglas Legg	33 – 30 October 1914
	11	Ronald Legg	20 – 25 March 1928
	12	Harry Weston	–
	13	Alexander Eke	35 – 9 October 1912
	14	Stanley McMeekan	23 – 7 March 1925
	15	Sydney McMeekan	23 – 7 March 1925

Head coach

- (United Kingdom) James Clay

Legend

- Club – describes last
  club before the competition
- Age – describes age
  on 30 July 1948

=== Hungary ===
The following players represented Hungary:

Hungary men's national basketball team roster
Players
Coaches

Pos.	No.	Name	Age – Date of birth	Height	Club	Ctr.
		Antal Bánkuti	25 – 1 June 1923
		János Halász	19 – 15 May 1929
		Géza Kardos	30 – 20 June 1918
		József Kozma	23 – 24 March 1925
		István Lovrics	21 – 6 July 1927
		Tibor Mezőfi	22 – 8 March 1926
		György Nagy	21 – 21 December 1926
		László Novakovszky	24 – 27 December 1923
		Attila Timár-Geng	24 – 25 May 1924
		István Timár-Geng	25 – 26 March 1923
		Ede Vadászi	24 – 13 September 1923
		Tibor Zsíros	18 – 30 June 1930

Head coach

- (Hungary) János Gyimesi

Legend

- Club – describes last
  club before the competition
- Age – describes age
  on 30 July 1948

=== Italy ===
The following players represented Italy:

Italy men's national basketball team roster
Players
Coaches

Pos.	No.	Name	Age – Date of birth	Height	Club	Ctr.
	3	Giancarlo Marinelli	32 – 4 December 1915		Virtus Bologna	(Italy)
	4	Gianfranco Bersani	29 – 2 January 1919		Virtus Bologna	(Italy)
	5	Vittorio Tracuzzi	25 – 2 January 1923		Società Ginnastica Roma	(Italy)
	6	Giancarlo Primo	23 – 4 November 1924		Società Ginnastica Roma	(Italy)
	7	Romeo Romanutti	21 – 6 August 1926		Società Ginnastica Triestina	(Italy)
	8	Luigi Rapini	24 – 21 July 1924		Virtus Bologna	(Italy)
	9	Carlo Cerioni	22 – 11 November 1925
	10	Sergio Ferriani	22 – 30 November 1925		Virtus Bologna	(Italy)
	11	Federico Marietti	22 – 9 December 1925
	12	Valentino Pellarini	28 – 26 October 1919
	13	Giovanni Nesti	25 – 23 September 1922
	14	Ezio Mantelli	24 – 10 February 1924
	15	Renzo Ranuzzi	24 – 14 July 1924		Virtus Bologna	(Italy)
	33	Sergio Stefanini	26 – 18 February 1922		Reyer Venezia	(Italy)

Head coach

- (United States) Elliott Van Zandt

Legend

- Club – describes last
  club before the competition
- Age – describes age
  on 30 July 1948

=== Uruguay ===
The following players represented Uruguay:

Uruguay men's national basketball team roster
Players
Coaches

Pos.	No.	Name	Age – Date of birth	Height	Club	Ctr.
		Adesio Lombardo	23 – 2 February 1925
		Carlos Roselló	26 – 2 May 1922
		Eduardo Folle	26 – 28 April 1922
		Eduardo Gordon	–
		Gustavo Magariños	24 – 31 December 1923
		Héctor García Otero	22 – 12 June 1926
		Héctor Ruiz	–
		Martín Acosta y Lara	23 – 25 March 1925
		Miguel Diab	27 – 16 September 1920
		Nelson Demarco	23 – 6 February 1925
		Néstor Antón	–
		Roberto Lovera	25 – 14 November 1922
		Victorio Cieslinskas	25 – 27 October 1922
		Abraham Grossman	–

Head coach

- (Uruguay) Raúl Canale

Legend

- Club – describes last
  club before the competition
- Age – describes age
  on 30 July 1948

== Group B ==
=== Belgium ===
The following players represented Belgium:

Belgium men's national basketball team roster
Players
Coaches

Pos.	No.	Name	Age – Date of birth	Height	Club	Ctr.
	3	Armand Van Wambeke	22 – 16 May 1926
	4	René Steurbaut	20 – 26 June 1928
	5	Julien Meuris	26 – 21 March 1922
	6	Georges Baert	22 – 4 June 1926
	7	Henri Hermans	29 – 3 March 1919
	8	Émile Kets	24 – 8 December 1923
	9	Henri Coosemans	26 – 10 January 1922
	10	Alexander Hollanders	22 – 29 March 1926
	11	Henri Hollanders	25 – 9 November 1922
	12	Augustin Bernaer	22 – 8 May 1926
	13	Louis Van De Goor	32 – 25 December 1915
	14	François De Pauw	21 – 28 December 1926
	15	Gustave Poppe	23 – 21 August 1924
	16	Léon Lampo	25 – 28 January 1923

Head coach

- (Belgium) Raymond Briot

Legend

- Club – describes last
  club before the competition
- Age – describes age
  on 30 July 1948

=== Chile ===
The following players represented Chile:

Chile men's national basketball team roster
Players
Coaches

Pos.	No.	Name	Age – Date of birth	Height	Club	Ctr.
		Eduardo Cordero	26 – 12 September 1921
		Exequiel Figueroa	–
		Juan José Gallo	23 – 18 October 1924
		Rolando Hammer	–
		Eduardo Kapstein	34 – 28 March 1914
		Manuel Ledesma	27 – 12 August 1920
		Víctor Mahana	25 – 12 August 1922
		Luis Marmentini	–
		Andrés Mitrovic	27 – 21 May 1921
		Alejandro Moreno Rodillo	27 – 11 October 1920
		Eduardo Parra	–
		Hernán Raffo	19 – 2 July 1929
		Marcos Sánchez	–
		Guillermo Verdugo	–

Head coach

- (Chile) Luis Valenzuela González

Legend

- Club – describes last
  club before the competition
- Age – describes age
  on 30 July 1948

=== Republic of China ===
The following players represented the Republic of China:

Republic of China men's national basketball team roster
Players
Coaches

Pos.	No.	Name	Age – Date of birth	Height	Club	Ctr.
	3	Chua Bonhuaa	–
	4	Wu Chengzhang	24 – 7 May 1924
	5	Yee Jin	–
	6	Lee Tsuntung	32 – 11 April 1916
	7	Yu Saichang	–
	8	Kya Iskyun	–
	9	Edward Lee	–
	10	Cai Zhongqiang	–
	11	John Pao	–
	12	Wee Tian Siak	27 – 26 April 1921

Head coach

- (Taiwan) Song Junfu

Legend

- Club – describes last
  club before the competition
- Age – describes age
  on 30 July 1948

=== Iraq ===
The following players represented Iraq:

Iraq men's national basketball team roster
Players
Coaches

Pos.	No.	Name	Age – Date of birth	Height	Club	Ctr.
	4	Kadir Irfan	–
	5	Jalil Hashim	–
	6	Ali Salman	–
	7	Hamid Ahmed	–
	8	Awni Kanaan	–
	9	Mahdi Salman	–
	21	George Hanna	20 – 13 May 1928
	22	Yonan Emile	–
	24	Salih Faraj	–
	25	Wadud Khalil	–

Legend

- Club – describes last
  club before the competition
- Age – describes age
  on 30 July 1948

=== Philippines ===
The following players represented the Philippines:

Philippines men's national basketball team roster
Players
Coaches

Pos.	No.	Name	Age – Date of birth	Height	Club	Ctr.
	3	Felicisimo Fajardo	32 – 26 October 1915
	4	Andres dela Cruz	–
	5	Ramon Campos Jr.	22 – 15 December 1925
	6	Edgardo Fulgencio	30 – 29 October 1917
	7	Lauro Mumar	24 – 6 March 1924
	8	Primitivo Martínez	36 – 24 September 1911
	9	Francisco Vestil	33 – 17 September 1914
	10	Eduardo Decena	22 – 14 January 1926
	11	Gabriel Fajardo	31 – 24 March 1917
	12	Manuel Araneta Jr.	21 – 8 December 1926

Head coach

- (Philippines) Dionisio Calvo

Legend

- Club – describes last
  club before the competition
- Age – describes age
  on 30 July 1948

=== South Korea ===
The following players represented South Korea:

South Korea men's national basketball team roster
Players
Coaches

Pos.	No.	Name	Age – Date of birth	Height	Club	Ctr.
	3	Chang Ri-jin	30 – 28 October 1917
	5	O Su-cheol	–
	6	Bang Won-sun	–
	7	Lee Sang-hun	–
	8	Lee Jun-yeong	–
	9	Gang Bong-hyeon	–
	10	Jo Deuk-jun	–
	11	Kim Jeong-sin	–
	12	An Byeong-seok	–

Head coach

- (South Korea) Jung Sang-yun

Legend

- Club – describes last
  club before the competition
- Age – describes age
  on 30 July 1948

== Group C ==
=== Argentina ===
The following players represented Argentina:

Argentina men's national basketball team roster
Players
Coaches

Pos.	No.	Name	Age – Date of birth	Height	Club	Ctr.
F/C	3	Oscar Furlong	20 – 22 October 1927
	4	Bruno Varani	22 – 16 September 1925
G	5	Ricardo González	23 – 12 May 1925
	6	Rafael Lledó	26 – 2 March 1922
	7	Arturo Ruffa	21 – 25 December 1926
	8	Manuel Guerrero	–
	9	León Martinetti	21 – 31 July 1926
	10	Rubén Menini	24 – 20 February 1924
	11	Juan Uder	21 – 24 April 1927
	12	Tomás Vio	27 – 25 July 1921
	13	Leopoldo Contarbio	21 – 29 April 1927
	14	Jorge Nuré	21 – 24 September 1926
	15	Raúl Calvo	31 – 8 May 1917
	16	Oscar Pérez	25 – 4 November 1922

Head coach

- (Argentina) Jorge Canavesi

Legend

- Club – describes last
  club before the competition
- Age – describes age
  on 30 July 1948

=== Czechoslovakia ===
The following players represented Czechoslovakia:

Czechoslovakia men's national basketball team roster
Players
Coaches

Pos.	No.	Name	Age – Date of birth	Height	Club	Ctr.
	3	Zdeněk Chlup	25 – 28 September 1922
	4	Jiří Drvota	–
	5	Jan Kozák	19 – 5 July 1929		BC Brno	(Czechoslovakia)
	6	Václav Krása	–		BK Uncas Praha	(Czechoslovakia)
	7	Ladislav Trpkoš	33 – 17 January 1915		BK Uncas Praha	(Czechoslovakia)
	8	Josef Toms	26 – 26 January 1922
	9	Ctirad Benáček	23 – 8 September 1924		BC Sparta Praha	(Czechoslovakia)
	10	Josef Křepela	24 – 22 January 1924
	12	Jozef Kalina	23 – 22 November 1924
	13	Josef Ezr	24 – 3 October 1923		Slavia VŠ Praha	(Czechoslovakia)
	14	Josef Bělohradský	21 – 9 December 1926		BK Uncas Praha	(Czechoslovakia)
	15	Jiří Siegel	21 – 5 March 1927
	16	Zoltán Krenický	22 – 16 November 1925
	17	Ivan Mrázek	22 – 18 January 1926		BC Brno	(Czechoslovakia)

Head coach

- (Czechoslovakia) Josef Fleischlinger

Legend

- Club – describes last
  club before the competition
- Age – describes age
  on 30 July 1948

=== Egypt ===
The following players represented Egypt:

Egypt men's national basketball team roster
Players
Coaches

Pos.	No.	Name	Age – Date of birth	Height	Club	Ctr.
		Salah El-Dine Nessim	–
		Albert Tadros	33 – 8 August 1914
		Armand Catafago	22 – 13 January 1926
		Fouad Abdel Meguid El-Kheir	26 – 18 November 1921
		Hassan Sayed Moawad	–
		Hussain Montassir	25 – 2 March 1923
		Youssef Mohamed	21 – 5 January 1927
		Mohamed Mohamed Habib	–
		Mohamedi Soliman	–
		Robert Makzoumi	–
		Youssef Abou Ouf	24 – 23 March 1924
		Abdel Rahman Hafez Ismail	25 – 17 February 1923

Head coach

- (United States) Neal Harris

Legend

- Club – describes last
  club before the competition
- Age – describes age
  on 30 July 1948

=== Peru ===
The following players represented Peru:

Peru men's national basketball team roster
Players
Coaches

Pos.	No.	Name	Age – Date of birth	Height	Club	Ctr.
	3	Guillermo Ahrens	–
	5	José Vizcarra	21 – 16 March 1927
	6	Rodolfo Salas	20 – 25 May 1928
	7	Rodolfo Soracco	21 – 27 July 1927
	8	Virgilio Drago	–
	9	Alberto Fernández	–
	10	Carlos Alegre	24 – 7 May 1924
	11	Eduardo Fiestas	23 – 16 June 1925
	13	David Descalzo	28 – 2 January 1920
	14	Arturo Ferreyros	23 – 12 October 1924
	15	Luis Sánchez	–

Legend

- Club – describes last
  club before the competition
- Age – describes age
  on 30 July 1948

=== Switzerland ===
The following players represented Switzerland:

Switzerland men's national basketball team roster
Players
Coaches

Pos.	No.	Name	Age – Date of birth	Height	Club	Ctr.
	3	Georges Stockly	31 – 1 August 1916
	4	Henry Gujer	–
	5	Jean Pollet	36 – 18 July 1912
	6	Maurice Chollet	20 – 23 December 1927
	7	Claude Chevalley	–
	8	Pierre Albrecht	22 – 1 January 1926
	9	Marcos Bossy	28 – 18 April 1920
	10	Robert Geiser	–
	11	Jean Tribolet	–
	12	Claude Landini	22 – 1 March 1926
	13	Jean Pare	35 – 24 March 1913
	14	Bernard Dutoit	–
	15	Henri Baumann	20 – 15 August 1927
	16	Gérald Piaget	–

Head coach

- (Switzerland) André Mottier

Legend

- Club – describes last
  club before the competition
- Age – describes age
  on 30 July 1948

=== United States ===
The following players represented the United States:

United States men's national basketball team roster
Players
Coaches

Pos.	No.	Name	Age – Date of birth	Height	Club	Ctr.
	11	Lew Beck	26 – 19 April 1922		Phillips 66ers	(United States)
	12	Ralph Beard	20 – 2 December 1927		University of Kentucky	(United States)
	15	Alex Groza	21 – 7 October 1926		University of Kentucky	(United States)
	23	Cliff Barker	27 – 15 January 1921		University of Kentucky	(United States)
	24	Ray Lumpp	25 – 11 July 1923		New York University	(United States)
	26	Kenny Rollins	24 – 14 September 1923		University of Kentucky	(United States)
	27	Wallace Jones	22 – 14 July 1926		University of Kentucky	(United States)
	30	Vince Boryla	21 – 11 March 1927		University of Denver	(United States)
	33	Don Barksdale	25 – 31 March 1923		Oakland Bittners	(United States)
	55	Jesse Renick	30 – 29 September 1917		Phillips 66ers	(United States)
	66	Gordon Carpenter	28 – 24 September 1919		Phillips 66ers	(United States)
	77	Jackie Robinson	21 – 26 April 1927		Baylor University	(United States)
	90	Bob Kurland	23 – 23 December 1924		Phillips 66ers	(United States)
	99	Robert Pitts	29 – 23 June 1919		Phillips 66ers	(United States)

Head coach

- (United States) Bud Browning

Legend

- Club – describes last
  club before the competition
- Age – describes age
  on 30 July 1948

== Group D ==
=== Cuba ===
The following players represented Cuba:

Cuba men's national basketball team roster
Players
Coaches

Pos.	No.	Name	Age – Date of birth	Height	Club	Ctr.
		Casimiro García	18 – 12 April 1930
		Fabio Ruíz	20 – 7 August 1927
		Federico López	30 – 5 May 1918
		Frank Lavernia	30 – 3 April 1918
		José Llanusa	22 – 11 August 1925
		Mario Aguero	24 – 1 May 1924
		Mario Quintero	24 – 10 January 1924
		Miguel Llaneras	21 – 5 August 1926
		Ramón Wiltz	21 – 12 December 1926
		Raúl García	23 – 15 September 1924
		Alfredo Faget	25 – 1 July 1923
		Juan García	22 – 2 July 1926
		Pedro Otero	28 – 20 June 1920

Legend

- Club – describes last
  club before the competition
- Age – describes age
  on 30 July 1948

=== France ===
The following players represented France:

France men's national basketball team roster
Players
Coaches

Pos.	No.	Name	Age – Date of birth	Height	Club	Ctr.
	3	André Buffière	25 – 12 November 1922		UA Marseille	(France)
	4	René Dérency	23 – 27 May 1925
	5	Pierre Thiolon	21 – 17 January 1927
	6	Jacques Perrier	23 – 12 October 1924
	7	René Chocat	27 – 28 November 1920
	8	Raymond Offner	20 – 17 November 1927
	9	André Even	22 – 14 January 1926
	10	Maurice Desaymonnet	27 – 24 June 1921
	11	Fernand Guillou	22 – 6 January 1926
	12	Michel Bonnevie	26 – 19 November 1921
	13	Maurice Girardot	26 – 22 December 1921
	14	Lucien Rebuffic	23 – 22 December 1924
	15	Yvan Quénin	28 – 1 March 1920
	16	André Barrais	28 – 22 February 1920

Head coach

- (France) Robert Busnel

Legend

- Club – describes last
  club before the competition
- Age – describes age
  on 30 July 1948

=== Iran ===
The following players represented Iran:

Iran men's national basketball team roster
Players
Coaches

Pos.	No.	Name	Age – Date of birth	Height	Club	Ctr.
		Abolfazl Salabi	23 – 28 November 1924
		Asghar Ehssassi	–
		Fereidoun Esfandiary	17 – 15 October 1930
		Ferydoun Sadeghi	–
		Hussain Jabbar Zadegan	–
		Hossein Karandish	–
		Houshang Rafati	–
		Hossein Soudipour	26 – 21 March 1922
		Hossein Hashemi	–
		Hossein Soroudi	–
		Kazem Ashtari	–
		Ziaeddin Shademan	24 – 27 November 1923
		Matthew Farhang Mohtadi	22 – 6 January 1926

Head coach

- (Iran) Kazem Rambari

Legend

- Club – describes last
  club before the competition
- Age – describes age
  on 30 July 1948

=== Ireland ===
The following players represented Ireland:

Ireland men's national basketball team roster
Players
Coaches

Pos.	No.	Name	Age – Date of birth	Height	Club	Ctr.
	3	Kevin O'Donovan	–		Irish Army
	4	Frank O'Connor	–		Irish Army
	5	Tommy Malone	–		Irish Army
	6	Paddy Crehan	28 – 18 February 1920		Irish Air Corps
	7	Jimmy McGee	25 – 3 June 1923		Irish Army
	8	Bill Jackson	29 – 8 August 1918		Irish Army
	9	Harry Boland	22 – 21 September 1925		UCD (Dublin)
	10	Tommy Keenan	25 – 19 May 1923		Irish Army
	11	George McLoughlin	–		UCD (Dublin)
	12	Dermot Sheriff	27 – 10 August 1920		Irish Army
	13	Danny Reddin	33 – 12 August 1914		Irish Army
	14	Paddy Sheriff	21 – 15 August 1926		Irish Army
	15	Jim Flynn	–		Irish Army
	16	Christy Walsh	–		Irish Army

Head coach

- (Republic of Ireland) Donald McCormack

Legend

- Club – describes last
  club before the competition
- Age – describes age
  on 30 July 1948

=== Mexico ===
The following players represented Mexico:

Mexico men's national basketball team roster
Players
Coaches

Pos.	No.	Name	Age – Date of birth	Height	Club	Ctr.
	3	Jorge Gudiño	28 – 2 June 1920
	4	Francisco Galindo	–
	5	Emilio López	24 – 23 August 1923
	9	Angel Acuña Lizaña	29 – 11 February 1919
	12	Alberto Bienvenú	–
	13	Fernando Rojas	24 – 2 August 1923
	14	José Rojas	24 – 9 November 1923
	19	Jorge Cardiel	24 – 23 April 1924
	21	Isaac Alfaro	–
	22	Ignacio Romo Porchas	24 – 17 July 1924
	29	José Cabrera	27 – 22 January 1921
	33	Héctor Guerrero	21 – 24 November 1926
	55	Rodolfo Díaz	30 – 7 May 1918
	77	Josué Santos	32 – 1 July 1916

Head coach

- (Mexico) Agustín García Arreola

Legend

- Club – describes last
  club before the competition
- Age – describes age
  on 30 July 1948
