= Basketball at the 1948 Summer Olympics =

Coordinates: 51.5763°N 0.0977°W

2nd Olympic Basketball Tournament
- London 1948

Tournament details
- Olympics: 1948 Summer Olympics
- Host nation: United Kingdom
- City: London

Men's tournament
- Teams: 23
Medals
Gold medalists	United States
Silver medalists	France
Bronze medalists	Brazil

Tournaments
← Berlin 1936	Helsinki 1952 →

Basketball at the 1948 Summer Olympics was the second appearance of the sport of basketball as an official Olympic medal event. A total number of 23 nations entered the competition.

Olympic basketball returned to indoor competition in Harringay Arena, after the disastrous weather conditions of the final game in the 1936 Summer Olympics.

== Format ==
- In the preliminary rounds, teams were divided into 3 groups of 6 squads and a group with 5 squads.
- The preliminary round was played in a single round-robin format
- The Group tournament ranking system was observed as follows:

Team Result	Point Equivalent
Game Win	2
Game loss via ordinary circumstances	1
Game loss via default	0

- Ties were broken by the ratio of points scored to points allowed.
- After the preliminaries, the top 2 teams in each group will advance to the final round.
- The 4 remaining teams went to their respective classification playoffs.

Basketball

== Medalists ==
Gold	Silver	Bronze
United States; Cliff Barker; Don Barksdale; Ralph Beard; Lew Beck; Vince Boryla; Gordon Carpenter; Alex Groza; Wah Wah Jones; Bob Kurland; Ray Lumpp; R. C. Pitts; Jesse Renick; Jackie Robinson; Kenny Rollins	France; André Barrais; Michel Bonnevie; André Buffière; René Chocat; René Dérency; Maurice Desaymonnet; André Even; Maurice Girardot; Fernand Guillou; Raymond Offner; Jacques Perrier; Yvan Quénin; Lucien Rebuffic; Pierre Thiolon	Brazil; Zeny de Azevedo; João Francisco Bráz; Ruy de Freitas; Marcus Vinícius Dias; Affonso Évora; Alexandre Gemignani; Alfredo da Motta; Alberto Marson; Nilton Pacheco; Massinet Sorcinelli

== Participating teams ==
Defending Olympic Champion
Olympic Runner-up
Third placers
Host nation

Americas	Europe	Asia	Africa
United States	Great Britain	Philippines	Egypt
Brazil	Italy	South Korea	—
Mexico	France	Republic of China	—
Uruguay	Hungary	Iran	—
Canada	Belgium	Iraq	—
Chile	Czechoslovakia		—
Peru	Switzerland		—
Argentina	Ireland		—
Cuba			—

=== Qualification berths for the Tournament ===
Allocation of Berths
Continental Zones	Automatic Qualifier	Additional berths from the previous Games	Total
Host Nation	1	—N/a	1
Defending Olympic Champions	1	—N/a	1
Americas Region	5	3	8
Asian Region	5	—N/a	5
European Region	7	—N/a	7
Africa Region	1	—N/a	1
Total	20	3	23

== Group stage ==
=== Group A ===
Pos	Team	Pld	W	L	PF	PA	PD	Pts	Qualification
1	Brazil	5	5	0	261	150	+111	10	Advance to the quarterfinals
2	Uruguay	5	3	2	246	170	+76	8	Advance to the quarterfinals
3	Hungary	5	3	2	201	172	+29	8	Qualified to 9–16th classification round
4	Canada	5	3	2	222	205	+17	8	Qualified to 9–16th classification round
5	Italy	5	1	4	170	208	−38	6	Qualified to 17th–23rd classification round
6	Great Britain	5	0	5	103	298	−195	5	Qualified to 17th–23rd classification round

Source: FIBA archive
- Uruguay def. Great Britain, 69–17
- Brazil def. Hungary, 45–41
- Canada def. Italy, 55–37
- Brazil def. Uruguay, 36–32
- Canada def. Great Britain, 44–24
- Hungary def. Italy, 32–19
- Brazil def. Great Britain, 76–11
- Hungary def. Canada, 37–36
- Uruguay def. Italy, 46–34
- Italy def. Great Britain, 49–28
- Uruguay def. Hungary, 49–31
- Brazil def. Canada, 57–35
- Hungary def. Great Britain, 60–23
- Brazil def. Italy, 47–31
- Canada def. Uruguay, 52–50

=== Group B ===
Pos	Team	Pld	W	L	PF	PA	PD	Pts	Qualification
1	Chile	5	3	2	269	162	+107	8 (Note: Chile wins the five-way tiebreaker, with the following point differential in head-to-head matches among tied teams: Chile +25, Korea +6, Belgium -1, Philippines -9, and China -21.)	Advanced to the quarterfinals
2	South Korea	5	3	2	258	152	+106	8	Advanced to the quarterfinals
3	Belgium	5	3	2	232	155	+77	8	Qualified for 9–16th classification round
4	Philippines	5	3	2	261	198	+63	8	Qualified for 9–16th classification round
5	Republic of China	5	3	2	281	202	+79	8	Qualified for 17th–23rd classification round
6	Iraq	5	0	5	113	545	−432	5	Qualified for 17th–23rd classification round

Source: FIBA Archive
Notes:
- Philippines def. Iraq, 102–30
- Korea def. Belgium, 29–27
- Chile def. China, 44–39
- Chile def. Iraq, 100–18
- Philippines def. Korea, 35–33
- China def. Belgium, 36–34
- Chile def. Philippines, 68–39
- Belgium def. Iraq, 98–20
- China def. Korea, 49–48
- Belgium def. Chile, 38–36
- Korea def. Iraq, 120–20
- Philippines def. China, 51–32
- Belgium def. Philippines, 35–34
- China def. Iraq, 125–25
- Korea def. Chile, 28–21

=== Group C ===
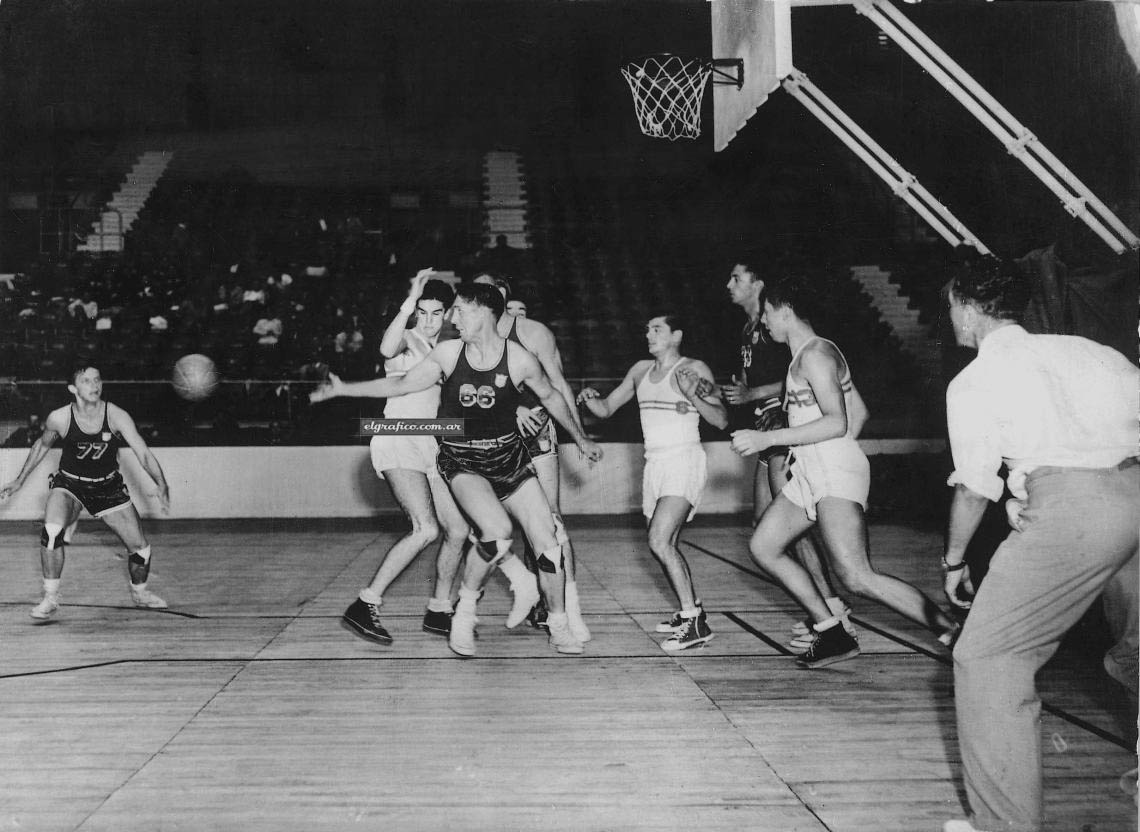
Scene of the USA v Argentina match

Pos	Team	Pld	W	L	PF	PA	PD	Pts	Qualification
1	United States	5	5	0	325	167	+158	10	Advanced to the quarterfinals
2	Czechoslovakia	5	4	1	217	190	+27	9	Advanced to the quarterfinals
3	Argentina	5	3	2	246	199	+47	8	Qualified for 9–16th classification round
4	Peru	5	2	3	198	187	+11	7	Qualified for 9–16th classification round
5	Egypt	5	1	4	162	256	−94	6	Qualified for 17th–23rd classification round
6	Switzerland	5	0	5	120	269	−149	5	Qualified for 17th–23rd classification round

Source: FIBA Archives
- United States def. Switzerland, 86–21
- Czechoslovakia def. Peru, 38–30
- Argentina def. Egypt, 57–38
- Peru def. Egypt, 52–27
- Argentina def. Switzerland, 49–23
- United States def. Czechoslovakia, 53–28
- Peru def. Switzerland, 49–19
- United States def. Argentina, 59–57
- Czechoslovakia def. Egypt, 52–38
- United States def. Egypt, 66–28
- Czechoslovakia def. Switzerland, 54–28
- Argentina def. Peru, 42–34
- Egypt def. Switzerland, 31–29
- United States def. Peru, 61–33
- Czechoslovakia def. Argentina, 45–41

=== Group D ===
Pos	Team	Pld	W	L	PF	PA	PD	Pts	Qualification
1	Mexico	4	4	0	234	109	+125	8	Advanced to the quarterfinals
2	France	4	3	1	214	131	+83	7	Advanced to the quarterfinals
3	Cuba	4	2	2	213	131	+82	6	Qualified for 9–16th classification round
4	Iran	4	1	3	136	215	−79	5	Qualified for 9–16th classification round
5	Ireland	4	0	4	70	281	−211	4	Qualified for 17th–23rd classification round

Source: FIBA Archives
- France def. Iran, 62–30
- Mexico def. Cuba, 39–31
- Mexico def. Ireland, 71–9
- France def. Cuba, 37–31
- Mexico def. France, 56–42
- Iran def. Ireland, 49–22
- Mexico def. Iran, 68–27
- Cuba def. Ireland, 88–25
- Cuba def. Iran, 63–30
- France def. Ireland, 73–14

== Classification rounds ==
=== 17th–23rd place classification rounds ===
A bye was given to Egypt as total number of teams is not a multiple of 2, which gave them bye to the classification semifinals. Also, Ireland was deemed to have finished last, due to the loss to Switzerland and a bye they earned from Iraq.

21st place match
C6	Switzerland (W/O)	2*
B6	Iraq	0

21st–23rd place semifinal
C6	Switzerland	55
D5	Ireland	12

Classification Quarterfinals
B4	Republic of China	42
C6	Switzerland	34
A6	Great Britain	46
D5	Ireland	21
A5	Italy	77
B6	Iraq	28

17th–20th place semifinals
B4	Republic of China	54
A6	Great Britain	25
A5	Italy	35
C5	Egypt	33

17th place match
B4	Republic of China	38
A5	Italy	54
19th place match
A6	Great Britain	18
C5	Egypt	50

==== Classification Quarterfinals ====
Republic of China	42–34	Switzerland

Harringay Arena, London

Great Britain	46–21	Ireland

Harringay Arena, London

Italy	77–28	Iraq

Harringay Arena, London

==== 21st–23rd place semifinal ====
Switzerland	55–12	Ireland

Harringay Arena, London

==== 17th–20th place semifinals ====
Republic of China	54–25	Great Britain

Harringay Arena, London

Italy	35–33	Egypt

Harringay Arena, London

=== 9th-16th place classification playoffs ===
Hungary forfeited all of their matches in the classification round, and a win were awarded to their respective opponents, which are marked by asterisks.

13th place match
D4	Iran	36
D3	Cuba	70
15th place match
A3	Hungary	0
C3	Argentina (W/O)	2*

13th–16th place semifinals
A3	Hungary	0
D4	Iran (W/O)	2*
D3	Cuba	35
C3	Argentina	34

Classification Quarterfinals
B3	Belgium (W/O)	2*
A3	Hungary	0
A4	Canada	81
D4	Iran	25
C4	Peru	45
D3	Cuba	40
B5	Philippines	45
C3	Argentina	43

9th–12th place semifinals
B3	Belgium	40
A4	Canada	45
C4	Peru	40
B5	Philippines	29

9th place match
A4	Canada	49
C4	Peru	43
11th place match
B3	Belgium	38
B5	Philippines	34

==== Classification quarterfinals ====
Hungary	0–2 (W/O)	Belgium
Forfeited

Harringay Arena, London

Canada	81–25	Iran

Harringay Arena, London

Cuba	40–45	Peru

Harringay Arena, London

Philippines	45–43	Argentina

Harringay Arena, London

==== 13th–16th place semifinals ====
Hungary	0–2 (W/O)	Iran
Forfeited

Harringay Arena, London

Cuba	35–34	Argentina

Harringay Arena, London

==== 9th–12th place semifinals ====
Belgium	40–45	Canada

Harringay Arena, London

Peru	40–29	Philippines

Harringay Arena, London

== Final round ==
Fifth place match
A2	Uruguay	50
B1	Chile	32
Seventh place match
B2	South Korea	38
C2	Czechoslovakia	39

5th–8th place semifinals
A2	Uruguay	45
B2	South Korea	36
C2	Czechoslovakia	36
B1	Chile	38

Quarterfinals
C1	United States	63
A2	Uruguay	28
D1	Mexico	43
B2	South Korea	32
A1	Brazil	28
C2	Czechoslovakia	23
D2	France	53
B1	Chile	52

Semifinals
C1	United States	71
D1	Mexico	40
A1	Brazil	33
D2	France	43

Gold medal match
C1	United States	65
D2	France	21
Bronze medal match
D1	Mexico	47
A1	Brazil	52

=== Quarterfinals ===
9 August 1948
21:00

United States	63–28	Uruguay

Harringay Arena, London

9 August 1948
19:30

Mexico	43–32	South Korea

Harringay Arena, London

9 August 1948
15:20

Brazil	28–23	Czechoslovakia

Harringay Arena, London

9 August 1948
15:40

France	53–52	Chile

Harringay Arena, London

=== 5th–8th place semifinals ===
11 August 1948

Uruguay	45–36	South Korea

Harringay Arena, London

11 August 1948

Czechoslovakia	36–38	Chile

Harringay Arena, London

=== Semifinals ===
11 August 1948
19:30

United States	71–40	Mexico

Harringay Arena, London

11 August 1948
21:00

Brazil	33–43	France

Harringay Arena, London

== Final classification matches ==
=== 21st place match ===
Switzerland	2–0 (W/O)	Iraq
Forfeited

Harringay Arena, London

=== 19th place match ===
Great Britain	18–50	Egypt

Harringay Arena, London

=== 17th place match ===
Italy	54–38	Republic of China

Harringay Arena, London

=== 15th place match ===
Hungary	0–2 (W/O)	Argentina
Forfeited

Harringay Arena, London

=== 13th place match ===
Cuba	70–36	Iran

Harringay Arena, London

=== 11th place match ===
12 August 1948
19:30

Report

Philippines	34–38	Belgium
Scoring by half: 16–16, 18–22
Pts: Ramon Campos 17		Pts: Henri Coosemans 14

Harringay Arena, London
Referees: Jan Osuský (TCH), Ernesto Lastra (ARG)

=== 9th place match ===
Canada	49–43	Peru

Harringay Arena, London

=== 7th place match ===
South Korea	38–39	Czechoslovakia

Harringay Arena, London

=== 5th place match ===
Uruguay	50–32	Chile

Harringay Arena, London

=== Bronze medal match ===
13 August 1948
19:30

Report

Mexico	47–52	Brazil
Scoring by half: 25–17, 22–35
Pts: Josué Santos 16		Pts: Alfredo da Motta 25

Harringay Arena, London

=== Gold medal match ===
13 August 1948

Report

United States	65–21	France
Scoring by half: 28–9, 37–12
Pts: Alex Groza 11		Pts: René Chocat 8

Harringay Arena, London
Referees: Abdel Azim Ashry, Vittorio Ugolini

== Awards ==
1948 Olympic Basketball Champions

United States
Second title

== Participating nations ==
For the team rosters see: Basketball at the 1948 Summer Olympics – Men's team squads.

Each country was allowed to enter one team of up to 14 players and they all were eligible for participation (with a maximum of five on the court at any given moment). A total of 298(*) basketball players from 23 nations competed at the London Games:

- Argentina (14)
- Belgium (14)
- Brazil (12)
- Canada (14)
- Chile (14)
- Republic of China (10)
- Cuba (14)
- Czechoslovakia (14)
- Egypt (14)
- France (14)
- Great Britain (13)
- Hungary (14)(**)
- Ireland (14)
- Iran (13)
- Iraq (10)
- Italy (14)
- South Korea (9)
- Mexico (14)
- Peru (11)
- Philippines (10)
- Switzerland (14)
- United States (14)
- Uruguay (14)

(*) NOTE: There are only players counted, which participated in one game at least, according to the official report, because the rosters for the matches are unknown. It is also unknown up to now, if there were more reserve players.

(*) and (**) It is uncertain if P. Benedek and J. Verbenyi played for Hungary in this tournament. The official report shows them, but Hungarian sources did not, however they are counted.

== Summary ==
Place	Nation
1	United States
	Head Coach: Omar Browning (Phillips 66ers (Bartlesville, OK)); Cliff Barker (Kentucky); Don Barksdale (Oakland Bittners/UCLA); Ralph Beard (Kentucky); Lew Beck (Phillips 66ers/Oregon State); Vince Boryla (Denver Nuggets/Denver); Gordon Carpenter (Phillips 66ers/Arkansas); Alex Groza (Kentucky); Wah Wah Jones (Kentucky); Bob Kurland (Phillips 66ers/Oklahoma St.); Ray Lumpp (NYU); R. C. Pitts (Phillips 66ers/Arkansas); Jesse Renick (Phillips 66ers/Oklahoma St.); Jackie Robinson (Baylor); Kenny Rollins (Kentucky)
2	France
3	Brazil
	Head Coach: Moacir Daiuto
4	Mexico Angel Acuña Lizaña; Issac Alfaro Loza; Alberto Bienvenu Barajas; Jorge Cardiel Gaytán; José de la Cruz Cabrera Gándara; Rodolfo Díaz Mercado; Francisco Galindo Chávez; Jorge Gudiño Goya; Héctor Guerrero Delgado; Emilio López Enríquez; Fernando Rojas Herrera; José Rojas Herera; Ignacio Romo Porchas; Josué Santos de León Neri
5	Uruguay Martín Acosta y Lara; Néstor F. Anton Giudice; Victorio Cieslinskas; Nelson Demarco; Miguel Carlos Diab Figoli; Abraham Eidlin Grossman; Eduardo A. Folle Colombo; Héctor García; Eduardo M. Gordon Morgan; Adesio Lombardo; Roberto Lovera; Gustavo Magariños Morales de los Ríos; Carlos Roselló; Héctor Ruiz
6	Chile Eduardo Cordero Fernández; Ezequiel Figueroa Reyes; Juan José Gallo Chinchilla; Roberto Hammer Casadio; Eduardo Kapstein Suckel; Manuel Ledesma Barrales; Víctor Mahana Badrie; Luis Enrique Marmentini Gil; Andrés Mitrovic Guic; Antonio Moreno Rodillo; Eduardo Parra Rojas; Hermán Raffo Abarca; Marcos Sánchez Carmona; Guillermo Verdugo Yañez
7	Czechoslovakia Head Coach: Josef Fleischlinger; Karel Bělohradský; Cyril Benáček; Jiří Chlup; Jiří Drvota; Josef Ezr; Jozef Kalina; Jan Kozák; Václav Krása; Zoltán Krenický; Jozef Křepela; Ivan Mrázek; Jiří Siegel; Josef Toms; Ladislav Trpkoš
8	South Korea Ahn Byung-Suk; Bang Won-Sun; Chang Chin-Ri; Chyo Joon-Deuk; Kang Hyun-Bong; Kim Shin-Chung; Lee Hoon-Sang; Lee Yung-Choon; Oh Chul-Soo
9	Canada Head Coach: Bob Osborne (University of British Columbia)); Ole Bakken (University of British Columbia); Bill Bell (University of British Columbia); Doodie Bloomfield (Montréal YMHA); Dave Campbell (University of British Columbia); Harry Kermode (University of British Columbia); Bennie Lands (Montréal YMHA); Pat McGeer (University of British Columbia); Reid Mitchell (University of British Columbia); Mendy Morein (Montréal YMHA); Nev Munro (University of British Columbia); Bobby Scarr (University of British Columbia); Cy Strulovitch (Montréal YMHA); Sol Tolchinsky (Montréal YMHA); Murray Waxman (Montréal YMHA)
10	Peru G. Ahrens Valdivia; Carlos Alegre Benavides; David Descalzo Álvarez; Virgilio Drago Burga; Alberto Fernández Calderón; Arturo Ferreyros Pérez; Eduardo Fiestas Arce; Rodolfo Salas Crespo; Luis Sánchez Maquiavelo; R. Ríos Soracco; José Vizcarra Nieto
11	Belgium Georges Baert; Auguste Bernaer; Henri Coosemans; François de Pauw; Henri Hermans; André Hollanders; Henri Hollanders; Emile Kets; Léon Lampo; Julien Meuris; Gustave Poppe; René Steurbaut; Luois van de Goor; Armand van Wambeke
12	Philippines Head Coach: Dionisio Calvo; Manuel Araneta; Ramón Campos; Eduardo Decena; Andrés de la Cruz; Felicisimo Fajardo; Gabriel Fajardo; Edgardo Fulgencio; Antonio Luis Martínez; Lauro Mumar; Francisco Vestil
13	Cuba Mario Aguero Medrano; José Miguel Alvarez Pozo; Casimiro García Artime; Juan García García; R. Carlos García Ordoñez; Francisco Lavernia Hernández; José Llanusa Gobel; Miguel Llaneras Rodríguez; Federico López Garviso; Pedro Manuel Otero Vázquez; Mario Quintero Padrón; Fabio Ruiz Vinajeras; Ramón Wiltz Bucelo; Otazo A. Paget
14	Iran Head Coach: Kazem Rahbari; Kazem Ashtari; Asghar Ehsasi; Fereidoun Esfandiari; Hossein Hashemi; Hossein Jabbarzadegan; Hossein Karandish; Farhang Mohtadi; Houshang Rafatjah; Fereydoon Sadeghi; Ziaoddin Shadman; Abolfazl Solbi; Hossein Sorouri; Hossein Saoudipour
15	Argentina Head Coach: Jorge Hugo Canavesi; Raúl Calvo; Leopoldo Contarbio; Óscar Furlong; Ricardo González; Manuel Guerrero; Rafael Lledó; León Martinetti; Rubén Menini; Jorge Nuré; Oscar Pérez Cattáno; Arturo Ruffa; Juan Carlos Uder; Bruno Varani; Tomás Vío
16	Hungary Antal Bánkuti; P. Benedek; János Halász; Géza Kardos; József Kozma; István Lovrics; Tibor Mezőfi; György Nagy; László Novakovszky; Attila Timár Geng; István Timár Geng; Ede Vadászi; J. Verbenyi; Tibor Zsíros
17	Italy Gianfranco Bersani; Carlo Cerioni; Sergio Ferriani; Ezio Mantelli; Federico Marietti; Giancarlo Marinelli; Giovanni Nesti; Valentino Pellarini; Giancarlo Primo; Renzo Ranuzzi; Luigi Rapini; Romeo Romanutti; Sergio Stefanini; Vittorio Tracuzzi
18	Republic of China Chia Chung-Chang; Chua Bon-Hua; Kya Is-Kyun; Lee Edward; Lee Tsun-Tung; Pao John Sung-Yuan; Wee Tian-Siak; Woo Cheng-Chang; Yee Jose; Yu Sai-Chang
19	Egypt Youssef Mohamed Abbas; Youssef Abou Ouf; Fouad Abdel Meguid Abu el Kheir; Armand Philippe Catafago; Mahmoud Gamal el Leissy; Albert Fahmy Tadros; Mohamed Habib; Abdelrahman Ismail Hafez; Robert Makzoume; Hassan Moawad; Medhat Youssef Mohamad; Hussein Kamal Montassir; Ahmed Nessim; Mohamed Soliman
20	Great Britain Frank Cole; Trevor C. Davies; Alexander Elk; Malcolm Finlay; Colin L. Hunt; Douglas C. Legg; Ronald H. Legg; Stanley McMeekan; Sydney McMeekan; Robert H. Norris; Lionel Price; Harry L. Weston; Stanley B. Weston
21	Switzerland Pierre Albrecht; Henri Baumann; Marc Bossy; Claude Chevalley; Maurice Chollet; Bernard Dutoit; Robert Geiser; Hans Gujer; Claude Landini; Jean Pare; G. Piaget; Jean Pollet; Georges Stockly; J. Tribolet
22	Iraq Hashim; Awni Kanaan; Kadir Irfan; Ali Salman; Salih Faraj; George Hanna; Hamid Ahmed; Wadud Khalil; Mahdi Salman; Yonan Emile
23	Ireland Harry Boland; Vincie Crehan; John Flynn; William Jackson; Thomas Keenan; James R. McGee; Gerald McLoughlin; Thomas Malone; Frank B. O'Connor; Donald O'Donovan; Daniel Reddin; Donald Sheriff; Patrick Sheriff; Christy Walsh; Liam Doherty
