= Ireland men's national basketball team =

Ireland
- FIBA ranking: 85 ▼2 (1 September 2026)
- Joined FIBA: 1947
- FIBA zone: FIBA Europe
- National federation: Basketball Ireland
- Coach: Michael Bree
- Nickname(s): Na buachaillí i nglas (The Boys in Green)

Olympic Games
- Appearances: 1 (1948)
- Medals: None

FIBA World Cup
- Appearances: None

EuroBasket
- Appearances: None

Championship for Small Countries
- Appearances: 7
- Medals: (gold) Gold: (1994, 2021); (silver) Silver: (1988); (bronze) Bronze: (2018)
Home	Away

First international
- Mexico 71–9 Ireland (London, England; 2 August 1948)

Biggest win
- Ireland 112–39 Gibraltar (Cardiff, Wales; 12 December 1990)

Biggest defeat
- Italy 128–49 Ireland (Edinburgh, Scotland; 3 May 1976)

The Ireland men's national basketball team (Irish: Foireann cispheile náisiúnta na hÉireann) represents the island of Ireland in international basketball. It is governed by Basketball Ireland with players from both the Republic of Ireland and Northern Ireland. Ireland plays their home matches at the National Basketball Arena in Tallaght, Dublin.

Ireland has little history on the international stage, as they have yet to qualify for top tournaments such as the EuroBasket or the FIBA World Cup. However, the national team did participate at the Summer Olympics once, in 1948.

== History ==
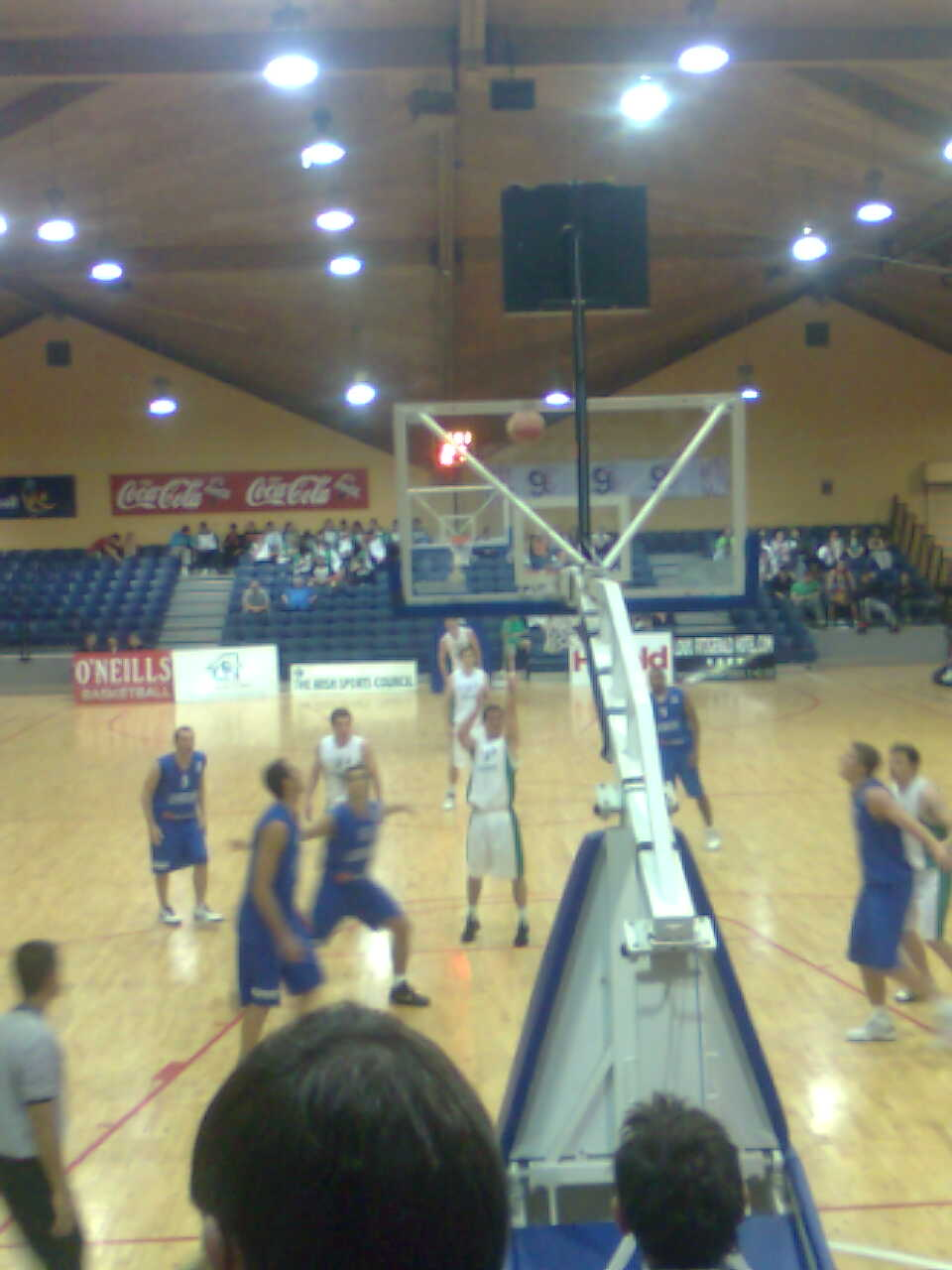
Ireland (white) against Luxembourg (blue) in 2009

The Amateur Basketball Association of Ireland (ABAI; now Basketball Ireland) was formed in 1945 and affiliated to FIBA in 1947. An indoor version of basketball had been played in the Irish Army from 1936, but using non-standard rules to create an indoor winter substitute for Gaelic football; until 1943, the Army Athletic Council officially recognized only Gaelic games. The ABAI sent a team of the best Army players to the 1948 Olympic tournament in nearby London, despite the refusal of Army command to release the players for intensive training. The team coaches were officers unfamiliar with the sport, who outranked the players and ignored their advice. Although many top sides were absent from the London Games in the aftermath of World War II, the Irish team finished last, losing every match heavily; the worst a 71–9 loss to Mexico, who finished fourth. Only two members of the team were over 6 feet (1.8 m) tall.

The team's standard improved gradually from the 1970s to the 2000s, as more school leavers won scholarships to play US college basketball, and some Irish American professional players took up eligibility to compete for their ancestral country. Ireland entered European-zone Olympic qualification tournaments in 1972, 1976, 1984, and 1988, losing every match each time. In 1988, Ireland finished runner-up in the inaugural Promotion Cup, the third tier of EuroBasket, later named EuroBasket Division C, and now the FIBA European Championship for Small Countries. In 1993, the National Basketball Arena opened in Dublin, which became the team's new permanent home. Division C was hosted there the following year, and Ireland beat Cyprus 81–78 in the final to gain promotion to EuroBasket Division B. Ireland narrowly failed to win promotion to Division A in FIBA EuroBasket 2005 Division B, losing to Denmark by four points after having won the first game in Dublin by ten.

In February 2010, during the Irish financial crisis, Basketball Ireland announced that it was €1.2m in debt and was deactivating its senior international squads to cut costs. In December 2015, the team was reactivated for 2016.

In December 2015, it was announced that Ireland would play at the 2016 FIBA European Championship for Small Countries. The team finished in the fourth position overall.

Ireland played in the 2018 FIBA European Championship for Small Countries, held in San Marino from 26 June to 1 July. Ireland finished (1–1) in group play, losing to Malta then defeating Andorra. In the semi-finals Ireland lost to Norway, sending the team to the bronze medal match where they defeated Gibraltar to finish in third place.

Three years later, Ireland hosted the 2021 FIBA European Championship for Small Countries in Dublin. The national team would go undefeated during the tournament at (4–0), to capture their second title at the competition all time.

After Ireland's 2021 European Championship for Small Countries triumph, they entered EuroBasket 2025 Pre-Qualifying, where they earned a victory in their first match away to Cyprus 73–81. Although following the win, Ireland would go (3–6) during the rest of their pre-qualifying campaign, to eventually be eliminated.

Ireland then put their focus into the 2027 FIBA World Cup European Pre-Qualifiers. However, they began their campaign with two demoralising losses, before sweeping their doubleheader in November 2024 against Azerbaijan and Kosovo. Ultimately, a heavy defeat at the hands of Switzerland 85–54 in February 2025, ended Ireland's hopes of progressing to the next round.

== Competitive record ==
=== FIBA World Cup ===
World Cup					Qualification		
Year	Position	Pld	W	L	Pld	W	L
(Argentina) 1950	Did not enter				Did not enter		
(Brazil) 1954	Did not enter				Did not enter		
(Chile) 1959	Did not enter				Did not enter		
(Brazil) 1963	Did not enter				Did not enter		
(Uruguay) 1967	Did not enter				Did not enter		
(Socialist Federal Republic of Yugoslavia) 1970	Did not enter				Did not enter		
(Puerto Rico) 1974	Did not enter				Did not enter		
(Philippines) 1978	Did not qualify				EuroBasket served as qualifiers		
(Colombia) 1982	Did not qualify				EuroBasket served as qualifiers		
(Spain) 1986	Did not enter				Did not enter		
(Argentina) 1990	Did not enter				Did not enter		
(Canada) 1994	Did not enter				Did not enter		
(Greece) 1998	Did not qualify				EuroBasket served as qualifiers		
(United States) 2002	Did not qualify				EuroBasket served as qualifiers		
(Japan) 2006	Did not qualify				EuroBasket served as qualifiers		
(Turkey) 2010	Did not qualify				EuroBasket served as qualifiers		
(Spain) 2014	Did not enter				Did not enter		
(China) 2019	Did not enter				Did not enter		
(Philippines) (Japan) (Indonesia) 2023	Did not enter				Did not enter		
(Qatar) 2027	Did not qualify				6	3	3
(France) 2031	To be determined				To be determined		
Total	0/20				6	3	3

=== Olympic Games ===
Olympic Games					Qualifying		
Year	Position	Pld	W	L	Pld	W	L
(Nazi Germany) 1936	No national representative						
(United Kingdom) 1948	23rd	6	0	6			
(Finland) 1952	Did not enter						
(Australia) 1956	Did not enter						
(Italy) 1960	Did not enter				Did not enter		
(Japan) 1964	Did not enter				Did not enter		
(Mexico) 1968	Did not enter				Did not enter		
(West Germany) 1972	Did not qualify				4	0	4
(Canada) 1976	Did not qualify				5	0	5
(Soviet Union) 1980	Did not enter				Did not enter		
(United States) 1984	Did not qualify				3	0	3
(South Korea) 1988	Did not qualify				4	0	4
(Spain) 1992	Did not qualify				5	0	5
(United States) 1996	Did not enter				Did not enter		
(Australia) 2000	Did not enter				Did not enter		
(Greece) 2004	Did not enter				Did not enter		
(China) 2008	Did not enter				Did not enter		
(United Kingdom) 2012	Did not enter				Did not enter		
(Brazil) 2016	Did not enter				Did not enter		
(Japan) 2020	Did not enter				Did not enter		
(France) 2024	Did not enter				Did not enter		
(United States) 2028	Did not enter				Did not enter		
Total	1/21	6	0	6	21	0	21

=== Championship for Small Countries ===
FIBA European Championship for Small Countries
Year	Position	Pld	W	L
(Malta) 1988	2nd place, silver medalist(s)	5	4	1
(Wales) 1990	4th	5	3	2
(Cyprus) 1992	4th	5	2	3
(Republic of Ireland) 1994	1st place, gold medalist(s)	5	5	0
(Moldova) 2016	4th	5	3	2
(San Marino) 2018	3rd place, bronze medalist(s)	4	2	2
(Republic of Ireland) 2021	1st place, gold medalist(s)	4	4	0
Total		33	23	10

=== EuroBasket ===
EuroBasket					Qualification		
Year	Position	Pld	W	L	Pld	W	L
(Switzerland) 1935	No national representative						
(Latvia) 1937	No national representative						
(Lithuania) 1939	No national representative						
(Switzerland) 1946	No national representative						
(Czechoslovakia) 1947	Did not enter						
(Egypt) 1949	Did not enter						
(France) 1951	Did not enter						
(Soviet Union) 1953	Did not enter						
(Hungary) 1955	Did not enter						
(Bulgaria) 1957	Did not enter						
(Turkey) 1959	Did not enter						
(Socialist Federal Republic of Yugoslavia) 1961	Did not enter						
(Poland) 1963	Did not enter				Did not enter		
(Soviet Union) 1965	Did not enter				Did not enter		
(Finland) 1967	Did not enter				Did not enter		
(Italy) 1969	Did not enter				Did not enter		
(West Germany) 1971	Did not enter				Did not enter		
(Spain) 1973	Did not enter				Did not enter		
(Socialist Federal Republic of Yugoslavia) 1975	Did not enter				Did not enter		
(Belgium) 1977	Did not qualify				5	1	4
(Italy) 1979	Did not enter				Did not enter		
(Czechoslovakia) 1981	Did not qualify				4	0	4
(France) 1983	Did not qualify				5	0	5
(West Germany) 1985	Did not enter				Did not enter		
(Greece) 1987	Did not qualify				4	0	4
(Socialist Federal Republic of Yugoslavia) 1989	Did not enter				Did not enter		
(Italy) 1991	Did not enter				Did not enter		
(Germany) 1993	Did not enter				Did not enter		
(Greece) 1995	Did not enter				Did not enter		
(Spain) 1997	Did not qualify				5	2	3
(France) 1999	Did not qualify				8	4	4
(Turkey) 2001	Did not qualify				11	3	8
(Sweden) 2003	Did not qualify				21	10	11
(Serbia and Montenegro) 2005	Division B				8	5	3
(Spain) 2007	Division B				6	1	5
(Poland) 2009	Division B				8	2	6
(Lithuania) 2011	Did not enter				Did not enter		
(Slovenia) 2013	Did not enter				Did not enter		
(France) (Croatia) (Germany) (Latvia) 2015	Did not enter				Did not enter		
(Finland) (Israel) (Romania) (Turkey) 2017	Did not enter				Did not enter		
(Czech Republic) (Georgia (country)) (Italy) (Germany) 2022	Did not enter				Did not enter		
(Cyprus) (Finland) (Poland) (Latvia) 2025	Did not qualify				10	4	6
(Estonia) (Greece) (Slovenia) (Spain) 2029	Qualification in progress				6	2	4
Total	0/38				101	34	67

== Results and fixtures ==
Win Loss

=== 2025 ===
20 February 2025 2027 FIBA World Cup pre-qualifiers – 1st round	Switzerland	85–54	Ireland	Fribourg, Switzerland
19:30 (UTC+1)	Scoring by quarter: 30–16, 18–15, 19–9, 18–14
	Pts: Mbala 19; Rebs: three players 5 Asts: Fofana 10	Boxscore	Pts: N. Quinn 18; Rebs: N. Quinn 9 Asts: Flood 3	Arena: Site Sportif Saint-Léonard; Attendance: 3,000; Referees: Alessandro Perciavalle (ITA), Arnau Padros (ESP), Ioannis Agrafiotis (GRE)

23 February 2025 2027 FIBA World Cup pre-qualifiers – 1st round	Azerbaijan	64–79	Ireland	Baku, Azerbaijan
17:00 (UTC+4)	Scoring by quarter: 16–21, 14–20, 19–13, 15–25
	Pts: S. Shirzadov 14; Rebs: Hall 12; Asts: K. Mammadov 4	Boxscore	Pts: Flood 23; Rebs: N. Quinn 9 Asts: Flood 5	Arena: Baku Sports Palace; Attendance: 700; Referees: Zdravko Rutešić (MNE), Duhan Köyiçi (TUR), Nemanja Vlahović (SRB)

27 November 2025 EuroBasket 2029 pre-qualifiers – 1st round	Luxembourg	89–77	Ireland	Luxembourg City, Luxembourg
19:30 (UTC+1)	Scoring by quarter: 26–11, 21–26, 17–24, 25–16
	Pts: Kovac 38; Rebs: Logelin, Rugg 6 Asts: Gutenkauf 6	Boxscore	Pts: Badmus 24; Rebs: Buivydas 10; Asts: Flood 6	Arena: d'Coque; Attendance: 1,200; Referees: Mehmet Karabilecen (TUR), Diogo Martins (POR), Karol Kowalski (POL)

30 November 2025 EuroBasket 2029 pre-qualifiers – 1st round	Ireland	76–88	North Macedonia	Dublin, Ireland
17:00 (UTC+0)	Scoring by quarter: 27–20, 13–22, 22–19, 14–27
	Pts: Alajiki 26; Rebs: Alajiki 10; Asts: Badmus 3	Boxscore	Pts: Jakimovski 26; Rebs: Wiley 9 Asts: Jakimovski, Mekić 4	Arena: National Basketball Arena; Attendance: 2,000; Referees: Marek Mikulčík (SVK), Martin Van Hoye (BEL), Jānis Rozenbergs (LAT)

=== 2026 ===
27 February 2025 EuroBasket 2029 pre-qualifiers – 1st round	Ireland	75–76	Azerbaijan	Dublin, Ireland
19:30 (UTC+0)	Scoring by quarter: 19–18, 16–23, 19–18, 21–17
	Pts: Flood 18; Rebs: N. Quinn 12; Asts: Fulton 11	Boxscore	Pts: Van Beck 20; Rebs: S. Donat, Van Beck 6 Asts: K. Mammadov 8	Arena: National Basketball Arena; Attendance: 2,000; Referees: Jan Baloun (CZE), Iain Macdonald (GRB), Nikola Bejat (NOR)

2 March 2026 EuroBasket 2029 pre-qualifiers – 1st round	Ireland	91–85	Luxembourg	Dublin, Ireland
19:30 (UTC+0)	Scoring by quarter: 22–23, 17–12, 26–21, 26–29
	Pts: N. Quinn 22; Rebs: N. Quinn 14; Asts: Fulton 12	Boxscore	Pts: Rugg 23; Rebs: Rugg 11; Asts: Gutenkauf 6	Arena: National Basketball Arena; Attendance: 2,000; Referees: Viktor Nagy (HUN), Pierre Landy (FRA), José Pedroso (POR)

27 June 2026 Friendly	Armenia	74–59	Ireland	Los Angeles, United States
17:00 (UTC-7)
		Report		Arena: Eagle's Nest Arena

2 July 2026 EuroBasket 2029 pre-qualifiers – 1st round	North Macedonia	77–56	Ireland	Skopje, North Macedonia
18:00 (UTC+2)	Scoring by quarter: 23–16, 15–11, 21–10, 18–19
	Pts: Jakimovski 19; Rebs: Jakimovski 13; Asts: Tashovski 5	Boxscore	Pts: Alajiki 20; Rebs: Alajiki 11; Asts: Flood 9	Arena: Lazar Lečić Sports Hall; Attendance: 500; Referees: Ali Şakacı (TUR), Alessandro Perciavalle (ITA), Gabrielius Simanavičius (LTU)

5 July 2026 EuroBasket 2029 pre-qualifiers – 1st round	Azerbaijan	70–76	Ireland	Baku, Azerbaijan
17:00 (UTC+4)	Scoring by quarter: 23–12, 12–19, 20–22, 15–23
	Pts: Van Beck 21; Rebs: Aydın 14; Asts: Aydın 6	Boxscore	Pts: Flood 25; Rebs: Alajiki 13; Asts: Alajiki, Flood 4	Arena: Baku Sports Palace; Attendance: 1,500; Referees: Mehmet Karabilecen (TUR), Vlad Cotrobaș (ROU), Sava Ćetković (MNE)

== Team ==
=== Current roster ===
Roster for the EuroBasket 2029 Pre-Qualifiers matches on 2 and 5 July 2026 against North Macedonia and Azerbaijan.

Ireland men's national basketball team roster
Players
Coaches

Pos.	No.	Name	Age – Date of birth	Height	Club	Ctr.
SG	0	Aivaras Uosis	21 – 2 March 2005	1.98 m (6 ft 6 in)	Carson–Newman	(United States)
SF	1	Declan Gbinigie	19 – 16 September 2006	1.96 m (6 ft 5 in)	Titans	(Republic of Ireland)
G	4	Adrian O'Sullivan	32 – 21 July 1993	1.86 m (6 ft 1 in)	Ballincollig	(Republic of Ireland)
SG	6	Sean Fitzpatrick	21 – 16 August 2004	1.95 m (6 ft 5 in)	UCD Marian	(Republic of Ireland)
F	8	Ben Stevens	27 – 21 May 1999	2.07 m (6 ft 9 in)	Montreal Alliance	(Canada)
F	9	Rapolas Buivydas	24 – 11 February 2002	2.03 m (6 ft 8 in)	Belfast Star	(Northern Ireland)
PG	11	Sean Flood (C)	29 – 10 September 1996	1.88 m (6 ft 2 in)	Den Bosch	(Netherlands)
C	12	Leeroy Odiahi	24 – 18 January 2002	2.11 m (6 ft 11 in)	Bisbal	(Spain)
C	17	Max Amadasun	25 – 26 September 2000	2.08 m (6 ft 10 in)	UPB Gandia	(Spain)
F/C	23	Victor Okojie	19 – 10 July 2006	2.06 m (6 ft 9 in)	UMass Lowell	(United States)
G/F	42	Tiernan Stynes	21 – 13 March 2005	1.98 m (6 ft 6 in)	Quincy Hawks	(United States)
PF	64	Samuel Alajiki	23 – 12 November 2002	2.01 m (6 ft 7 in)	Strasbourg	(France)

Head coach

- (Republic of Ireland) Michael Bree

Assistant coach(es)

- (Republic of Ireland) Ciaran O'Sullivan
- (Republic of Ireland) Paul Kelleher
- (Republic of Ireland) Colin O'Reilly

Legend

- (C) Team captain
- Club – describes last
  club before the competition
- Age – describes age
  on 2 July 2026

==== Depth chart ====
Pos.	Starting 5	Bench 1	Bench 2
C	Victor Okojie	Leeroy Odiahi
PF	Samuel Alajiki	Max Amadasun
SF	Ben Stevens	Rapolas Buivydas	Declan Gbinigie
SG	Tiernan Stynes	Sean Fitzpatrick	Sean Fitzpatrick
PG	Sean Flood	Adrian O'Sullivan

=== Head coach position ===
- (Republic of Ireland) Enda Byrt – (1990–1999)
- (Republic of Ireland) / (United States) Jay Larrañaga – (2008–2010)
- (Republic of Ireland) Mark Keenan – (2014)
- (Republic of Ireland) Colin O'Reilly – (2015)
- (United States) Pete Strickland – (2016–2018)
- (Republic of Ireland) Mark Keenan – (2019–2025)
- (Republic of Ireland) Michael Bree – (2025–present)

=== Notable players ===
- Cal Bowdler – former NBA player for the Atlanta Hawks, but not born in Ireland
- Pat Burke – Only Irish-born to have played in the NBA, played for the Orlando Magic & Phoenix Suns. Also a Euroleague and ULEB Eurocup winner with Panathinaikos and Real Madrid
- Marty Conlon – former NBA player for the Seattle SuperSonics, Sacramento Kings, Charlotte Hornets, Washington Bullets, Milwaukee Bucks, Boston Celtics, Miami Heat, and Los Angeles Clippers, but not born in Ireland
- Billy Donlon – former head coach of the Wright State University men's basketball team and as of 2019 head coach of UMKC.
- Aidan Igiehon – former Louisville and current Grand Canyon player
- Jay Larrañaga – former captain of the Ireland national team
- Donnie McGrath – Irish American, he played for Anadolu Efes, Spartak St. Petersburg and Žalgiris Kaunas amongst others
- Darren Randolph – former football goalkeeper and player for the Republic of Ireland national team, father Ed Randolph was an American who played basketball in Ireland. He taught his son basketball and Darren has since represented the national team

=== Past rosters ===
1948 Olympic Games: finished 23rd among 23 teams

4 Donald O'Donovan, 5 Frank O'Connor, 6 Paddy Crehan, 7 Jimmy McGee, 8 Bill Jackson, 9 Harry Boland, 10 Tommy Keenan,
12 Dermot Sheriff, 13 Danny Reddin, 14 Paddy Sheriff, 15 Jim Flynn, 16 Christy Walsh (Coach: Donald McCormack)

2016 FIBA European Championship for Small Countries: finished 4th among 8 teams

Ireland men's national basketball team roster
Players
Coaches

Pos.	No.	Name	Age – Date of birth	Height	Club	Ctr.
G	4	Adrian O'Sullivan	22 – 21 July 1993	1.86 m (6 ft 1 in)	UCC Demons	(Republic of Ireland)
G	5	Paul Dick	25 – 30 April 1991	1.93 m (6 ft 4 in)	Cheshire Jets	(England)
G	6	Lorcan Murphy	21 – 8 December 1994	1.86 m (6 ft 1 in)	Neptune	(Republic of Ireland)
SF	7	Ciarán O'Sullivan	25 – 27 December 1990	1.93 m (6 ft 4 in)	Swords Thunder	(Republic of Ireland)
SF	9	Stephen James	24 – 16 March 1992	1.88 m (6 ft 2 in)	Cheshire Jets	(England)
C	10	Brian Fitzpatrick	26 – 6 November 1989	2.04 m (6 ft 8 in)	Horsens	(Denmark)
C	11	Keelan Cairns	24 – 26 May 1992	2.09 m (6 ft 10 in)	UCC Demons	(Republic of Ireland)
PF	12	Colin O'Reilly	32 – 30 January 1984	2.00 m (6 ft 7 in)	UCC Demons	(Republic of Ireland)
F	13	Jordan Blount	19 – 5 January 1997	2.00 m (6 ft 7 in)	UIC Flames	(United States)
C	14	Conor Gallagher	31 – 15 September 1984	2.08 m (6 ft 10 in)	Killester	(Republic of Ireland)
F	15	Kevin Lacey	27 – 24 February 1989	1.98 m (6 ft 6 in)	Swords Thunder	(Republic of Ireland)
PG	16	Kyle Hosford	27 – 27 June 1989	1.82 m (6 ft 0 in)	UCC Demons	(Republic of Ireland)

Head coach

- (Republic of Ireland) Colin O'Reilly

Assistant coach(es)

- (Republic of Ireland) Puff Summers

Legend

- (C) Team captain
- Club – describes last
  club before the competition
- Age – describes age
  on 28 June 2016

2018 FIBA European Championship for Small Countries: finished (bronze) among 7 teams

Ireland men's national basketball team roster
Players
Coaches

Pos.	No.	Name	Age – Date of birth	Height	Club	Ctr.
G	4	Adrian O'Sullivan	24 – 21 July 1993	1.86 m (6 ft 1 in)	UCC Demons	(Republic of Ireland)
SG	5	Aidan Quinn	22 – 10 July 1995	1.80 m (5 ft 11 in)	Belfast Star	(Northern Ireland)
G	6	Lorcan Murphy	23 – 8 December 1994	1.86 m (6 ft 1 in)	Templeogue	(Republic of Ireland)
PG	7	Patrick Lyons	22 – 16 August 1995	1.84 m (6 ft 0 in)	Moycullen	(Republic of Ireland)
SG	8	Travis Black	27 – 16 January 1991	1.94 m (6 ft 4 in)	Swords Thunder	(Republic of Ireland)
F	9	Jordan Blount	21 – 5 January 1997	2.00 m (6 ft 7 in)	UIC Flames	(United States)
PG	10	Ciaran Roe	25 – 21 June 1993	1.80 m (5 ft 11 in)	Killester	(Republic of Ireland)
SF	11	Matthew Kelly	30 – 15 October 1987	1.95 m (6 ft 5 in)	UCD Marian	(Republic of Ireland)
F	12	Taiwo Badmus	24 – 3 July 1993	2.00 m (6 ft 7 in)	Virginia–Wise	(United States)
C	14	Keelan Cairns	26 – 26 May 1992	2.09 m (6 ft 10 in)	Belfast Star	(Northern Ireland)
C	15	Eoghain Kiernan	21 – 10 July 1996	2.06 m (6 ft 9 in)	Killester	(Republic of Ireland)
C	16	Paul Freeman	35 – 31 March 1983	2.00 m (6 ft 7 in)	Moycullen	(Republic of Ireland)

Head coach

- (United States) Pete Strickland

Assistant coach(es)

- (Greece) Ioannis Liapakis

Legend

- (C) Team captain
- Club – describes last
  club before the competition
- Age – describes age
  on 26 June 2018

2021 FIBA European Championship for Small Countries: finished (gold) among 5 teams

Ireland men's national basketball team roster
Players
Coaches

Pos.	No.	Name	Age – Date of birth	Height	Club	Ctr.
G	4	Adrian O'Sullivan	28 – 21 July 1993	1.86 m (6 ft 1 in)	Carbajosa	(Spain)
PG	5	CJ Fulton	19 – 24 June 2002	1.83 m (6 ft 0 in)	Lafayette College	(United States)
G	6	Lorcan Murphy	26 – 8 December 1994	1.86 m (6 ft 1 in)	Templeogue	(Republic of Ireland)
G	7	Sean Flood	24 – 10 September 1996	1.88 m (6 ft 2 in)	Karlsruhe	(Germany)
PG	8	Kyle Hosford	32 – 27 June 1989	1.82 m (6 ft 0 in)	UCC Demons	(Republic of Ireland)
F	9	Eoin Quigley	29 – 18 September 1991	1.96 m (6 ft 5 in)	Tralee Warriors	(Republic of Ireland)
PG	10	Ciaran Roe	28 – 21 June 1993	1.80 m (5 ft 11 in)	Killester	(Republic of Ireland)
F	11	Neil Randolph	29 – 29 February 1992	1.96 m (6 ft 5 in)	Templeogue	(Republic of Ireland)
C	12	Will Hanley	31 – 12 March 1990	2.01 m (6 ft 7 in)	Hebraica Macabi	(Uruguay)
F	13	Jordan Blount	24 – 5 January 1997	2.03 m (6 ft 8 in)	Carbajosa	(Spain)
F	14	John Carroll	26 – 16 March 1995	2.03 m (6 ft 8 in)	Zamora	(Spain)
C	15	Jason Killeen (C)	36 – 22 January 1985	2.09 m (6 ft 10 in)	Templeogue	(Republic of Ireland)

Head coach

- (Republic of Ireland) Mark Keenan

Assistant coach(es)

- (Republic of Ireland) Adrian Fulton
- (Republic of Ireland) Puff Summers

Legend

- (C) Team captain
- Club – describes last
  club before the competition
- Age – describes age
  on 10 August 2021

== Kit ==
=== Manufacturer ===
- 2013–2016 Macron
- 2016–2024 Kappa
- 2024–present Nike

== See also ==
- Sport in Ireland
- Ireland women's national basketball team
- Ireland men's national under-20 basketball team
- Ireland men's national under-18 basketball team
- Ireland men's national under-16 basketball team
- Ireland men's national 3x3 team
- Super League
