= Peru at the 1948 Summer Olympics =

- IOC code: PER
- NOC: Peruvian Olympic Committee

in London
- Competitors: 41 in 7 sports
- Flag bearer: Carlos Dominguez Mavila
- Medals Ranked 22nd: Gold 1 Silver 0 Bronze 0 Total 1

Summer Olympics appearances (overview)
- 1900; 1904–1932; 1936; 1948; 1952; 1956; 1960; 1964; 1968; 1972; 1976; 1980; 1984; 1988; 1992; 1996; 2000; 2004; 2008; 2012; 2016; 2020; 2024; 2028

Peru competed at the 1948 Summer Olympics in London, England. 41 competitors, all men, took part in 26 events in 7 sports.

== Medalists ==
=== Gold ===
- Edwin Vásquez — Shooting, Men's free pistol

== Athletics ==
Men
Track and road events

Event	Athletes	Heat round 1		Heat round 2		Semifinal		Final	
Event	Athletes	Result	Rank	Result	Rank	Result	Rank	Result	Rank
100 m	Maximo Reyes	unknown	4	Did not advance					
100 m	Santiago Ferrando	unknown	4	Did not advance					
200 m	Santiago Ferrando	22.5	2 Q	unknown	5		Did not advance		
800 m	Antero Mongrut	1:58.7	6	N/A		Did not advance			
1,500 m	Antero Mongrut	unknown	7	N/A		Did not advance			
110 m hurdles	Hernán Alzamora	unknown	4	Did not advance					

Field events

Event	Athletes	Final	
Event	Athletes	Result	Rank
Triple jump	Maximo Reyes	unknown	
Pole vault	Luis Ganoza	unknown	
Pole vault	Jaime Pigueras	unknown	
Shot put	Lionelo Patiño	unknown	
Discus throw	Manuel Consiglieri	unknown	
Discus throw	Eduardo Julve	44.05	12

== Basketball ==
=== Men's team competition ===
Team	Pld	W	L	PF	PA	Pts
United States	5	5	0	325	167	10
Czechoslovakia	5	4	1	217	190	9
Argentina	5	3	2	236	199	8
Peru	5	2	3	198	187	7
Egypt	5	1	4	162	256	6
Switzerland	5	0	5	120	269	5

Preliminary Round (Group C)

Czechoslovakia	38–30	Peru

Harringay Arena, London

Peru	52–27	Egypt

Harringay Arena, London

Peru	49–19	Switzerland

Harringay Arena, London

Argentina	42–34	Peru

Harringay Arena, London

United States	61–33	Peru

Harringay Arena, London

Classification Matches

9th/16th place

Peru	45–40	Cuba

Harringay Arena, London

9th/12th place

Peru	40–29	Philippines

Harringay Arena, London

9th/10th place

Canada	49–43	Peru

Harringay Arena, London

Team Roster

- Guillermo Ahrens Valdivia
- Carlos Alegre Benavides
- David Descalzo Álvarez
- Virgilio Drago Burga
- Alberto Fernández Calderón
- Arturo Ferreyros Pérez
- Eduardo Fiestas Arce
- Rodolfo Salas Crespo
- Luis Sánchez Maquiavelo
- R. Ríos Soracco
- José Vizcarra Nieto

== Boxing ==
Athlete	Event	Round of 32	Round of 16	Quarterfinals	Semifinals	Final
Athlete	Event	Opposition Result	Opposition Result	Opposition Result	Opposition Result	Opposition Result
Carlos Menezes	Men's flyweight	Corman (NED); L	Did not advance			
Santiago Rivera	Men's bantamweight	Ahlin (SWE); PTS	Csik (HUN); L	Did not advance		
Pedro Garcia	Men's featherweight	Sørensen (DEN); PTS	Antkiewicz (POL); L	Did not advance		

== Cycling ==
=== Road ===
Men

Rider	Event	Time	Rank
Hernán Llerena	Road race	DNF	
Pedro Mathey	Road race	DNF	
Luis Poggi	Road race	DNF	

== Fencing ==
Three fencers, all men, represented Peru in 1948.

Men's foil

- Hugo Higueras

Men's épée

- Carlos Iturri

Men's sabre

- Jorge Sarria

== Shooting ==
Nine shooters represented Peru in 1948.

Pistol

Athlete	Event	Final	
Athlete	Event	Score	Rank
Edwin Vásquez	50 m pistol	545	Gold
Wenceslao Salgado	50 m pistol	512	27
César Injoque	50 m pistol	507	34
Froilán Tantaleán	25 metre rapid fire pistol	520	35
Raúl Valderrama	25 metre rapid fire pistol	506	37
Enrique Mendizábal	25 metre rapid fire pistol	480	48

Rifle

Athlete	Event	Final	
Athlete	Event	Score	Rank
Enrique Baldwin	50 m rifle 3 positions	1052	20
Enrique Baldwin	50 m rifle prone	596	6
Augusto Larrabure	50 m rifle prone	586	35
Luis Mantilla	50 m rifle prone	586	41

== Weightlifting ==
Men

Athlete	Event	Press	Snatch	Clean & jerk	Total	Rank
Gonzalo Alvaro Cornejo	Lightweight	90	95	120	305	16
Alex Bisiak	Light-heavyweight	97.5	102.5	132.5	332.5	15
Carlos Dominguez Mavila	Heavyweight	117.5	105	140	362.5	10
