= Lew Beck =

Lewis or Lew Beck may refer to:

- Lewis Caleb Beck (1798–1853), American physician, botanist, chemist, and mineralogist
- Lew Beck (basketball) (1922–1970), American 1948 Summer Olympics gold medalist in basketball
- Lewis White Beck (1913–1997), American scholar in German philosophy
