= Carlos Domínguez (weightlifter) =

Peruvian weightlifter (1922–2008)

Personal information
- Nationality: Peruvian
- Born: 7 January 1922 Santa Rosa de Ocopa, Peru
- Died: 2008 (aged 85–86) Peru

Sport
- Sport: Weightlifting

Carlos Domínguez (7 January 1922 – 2008) was a Peruvian weightlifter. He competed in the men's heavyweight event at the 1948 Summer Olympics.
