= Murray Waxman =

Canadian basketball player (1925–2022)

Personal information
- Born: July 10, 1925 Toronto, Ontario, Canada
- Died: November 27, 2022 (aged 97)
- Listed height: 6 ft 0 in (1.83 m)
- Listed weight: 154 lb (70 kg)
Medals
Men's basketball
Representing Canada
Maccabiah Games
Silver medal – second place	1950 Maccabiah Games

Murray Waxman (July 10, 1925 – November 27, 2022) was a Canadian basketball player who competed in the 1948 Summer Olympics and the 1950 Maccabiah Games.

== Early life and career ==
Born in Toronto, Ontario, he played for YMHA Montreal and was part of the Canadian basketball team which finished eighth in the Olympic tournament.

Waxman later won a silver medal representing Canada at the 1950 Maccabiah Games in Tel Aviv.

== Death ==
Waxman died on November 27, 2022, at the age of 97.
