= Yu Saichang =

Chinese basketball player (1923–2008)

Personal information
- Nationality: Chinese
- Born: 1923
- Died: 2008 (aged 84–85)

Sport
- Sport: Basketball

Yu Saichang (1923–2008) was a Chinese basketball player. He competed in the men's tournament at the 1948 Summer Olympics.
