= Raymond Offner =

French basketball player

- Born: Raymond Offner; 17 November 1927; Sarcelles, France
- Died: 30 October 1989 (aged 61)
- Occupation: Basketball player

Olympic medal record

Men's basketball
Silver medal – second place	1948 London	Team competition

Raymond Offner (17 November 1927 – 30 October 1989) was a French basketball player who competed in the 1948 Summer Olympics. He was part of the French basketball team, which won the silver medal.
