= Mario Aguero =

Mario Aguero may refer to:

- Mario Aguero (basketball)
- Mario Agüero (roller hockey)
