= André Even (basketball) =

French basketball player (1926–2009)

- Born: André Even; 14 January 1926; Pont-l'Évêque, Calvados, France
- Died: 10 October 2009 (aged 83)
- Occupation: Basketball player

Olympic medal record

Men's basketball
Silver medal – second place	1948 London	Team competition

André Even (14 January 1926 – 10 October 2009) was a French basketball player who competed in the 1948 Summer Olympics. He was part of the French basketball team, which won the silver medal.
