= Yee Jin =

Chinese basketball player

Personal information
- Nationality: Chinese

Sport
- Sport: Basketball

Yee Jin was a Chinese basketball player. He competed in the men's tournament at the 1948 Summer Olympics.
