= Kya Iskyun =

Chinese basketball player

Personal information
- Nationality: Chinese
- Died: 18 January 1989

Sport
- Sport: Basketball

Achievements and titles
- Olympic finals: 1948 Summer Olympics

Kya Iskyun (Chinese:贾志军, died 18 January 1989) was a Chinese basketball player. He competed in the men's tournament at the 1948 Summer Olympics.
