= Wu Chengzhang =

Chinese basketball player (born 1924)

Wu Chenzhang
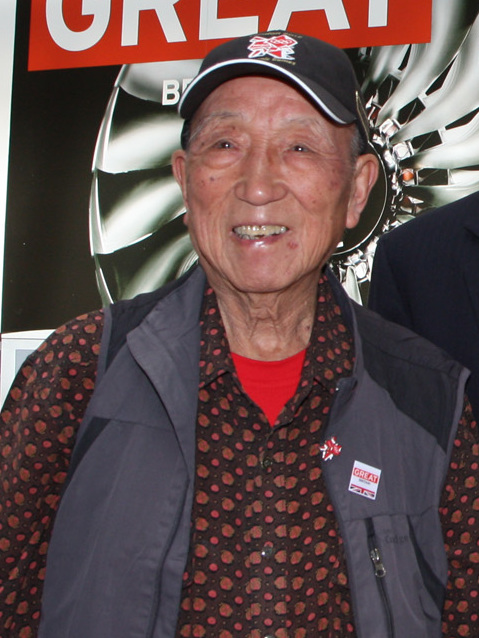
- Wu in 2012

Personal information
- Born: 8 February 1924 (age 102) Republic of China

Career highlights
- 18th place in the 1948 Summer Olympics

Wu Chengzhang or Woo Cheng-Chang (born 8 February 1924) is a Chinese basketball player who competed in the 1948 Summer Olympics. Following the death of French cyclist Charles Coste in October 2025, Wu became the oldest living participant of the 1948 Games.

== Career ==
Wu was part of the China basketball team, which finished 18th in the Olympic tournament. He scored 32 points in one of his games against Iraq, setting a record for the highest personal score for one game at that tournament. Wu returned to China, where he played and coached basketball in his hometown of Shanghai until he retired. He is much respected in China as the country's oldest living Olympian and one of the last remaining 1948 Olympians.

== Personal life ==
Wu turned 100 on 8 February 2024.

His son, Wu Xinshui, was a well-known basketball player who was voted as one of the 50 best Chinese players of all time in a 1999 national survey.
