= Yvan Quénin =

French basketball player

Olympic medal record

Men's basketball
| Silver medal – second place | 1948 London | Team competition |

Yvan Quénin (1 March 1920 – 27 July 2009) was a French basketball player who competed in the 1948 Summer Olympics. He was part of the French basketball team, which won the silver medal.
