= Jozef Kalina =

Slovak basketball player

Jozef Kalina (November 22, 1924 in Bratislava – April 21, 1986 in Bratislava) was a Czechoslovak/Slovak basketball player who competed in the 1948 Summer Olympics.

He was part of the Czechoslovak basketball team, which finished seventh in the 1948 Olympic tournament.
