= Wadud Khalil =

Iraqi basketball player (born 1927)

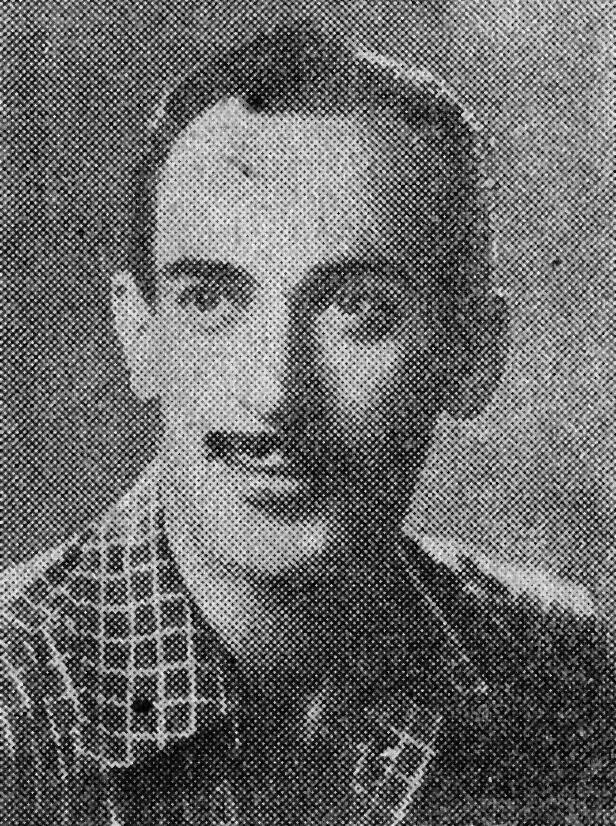

Personal information
- Full name: Abdul-Wadud Khalil Jumaa Al-Janabi
- Date of birth: 1927 (age 98–99)
- Place of birth: Baghdad, Iraq
- Position: Half back

Senior career*
Years	Team	Apps	(Gls)
1945–1947	Nadi Al-Olympia Al-Maliki		
1947–1953	Al-Kuliya Al-Askariya		
1954–1955	Austria Wien		
1955–1957	Polizei SV Wien		
1957–1959	Arabische Jugend Bonn		

International career
1951	Iraq		
- * Club domestic league appearances and goals

Abdul-Wadud Khalil Jumaa Al-Janabi (Arabic: ودود خليل; born 1927) was an Iraqi football and basketball player. He competed in the men's basketball tournament at the 1948 Summer Olympics, and was the captain of the first Iraq national football team.

== Biography ==
Khalil was born in Baghdad and excelled at football, basketball, hockey and water polo. He was even trained by Englishman George Raynor who selected the 17-year-old to play at right halfback against Lebanon in 1945 in Baghdad.

Wadud went on to pursue a career in the army and graduated as a second lieutenant in 1950 from the Kuliya Al-Askariya (military college). As a student he represented the College in table tennis, water polo, badminton and the track and field athletics and captained their football and basketball teams.

In 1953 he left the army, reportedly discharged because of a back injury, however the real reason could have been political. A month later the Iraqi captain left for Vienna to study. That same year the papers in Baghdad reported he had rejected an offer from Turkey’s Fenerbahçe SK.

Little is known of his time in European football, apart from a brief account he gave about his spell at Austria Wien, in an interview with a Baghdad newspaper in 1980. Wadud said, "In the year 1955, I began my journey to the West. I left beloved Baghdad and packed my bags for Vienna, the Austrian capital. I began my life in European football at the Austria Club. Suffice to say that I was the fifth grade among the team’s players. I played one season at the Austria Club at centre half and the club finished in third place in the league. As I was playing football for the Austria Club, I was on the Vienna amateur basketball team".

There are no records of Wadud Khalil making an appearance for Austria Wien's first team but the Iraqi captain could have played for one of the club’s reserve teams. He was apparently studying in Vienna and the club paid for his food and lodgings and while in Austria he claimed he broke a goalkeeper’s wrist with a penalty strike.

In 1948 Wadud captained the Iraqi Basketball side in their first match at the Olympics against the Philippines recording 11 points in ten minutes. He was Iraq’s top points scorer at the Games, with 50 of Iraq’s 141 points at the tournament. The 1948 Summer Games in London was the first and only time Iraq fielded a basketball team as they suffered five of the worst-ever defeats in Olympic history.

A star in the local game, when the Iraq FA were forming their first ever national team after it became a member of FIFA, Wadud Khalil was named captain and led the Iraqi team in their tour of Turkey playing two matches in Izmir and Ankara. In Iraq's first-ever international against Turkey’s B team, Iraq were defeated 7-0. The captain was one of the few Iraqi players commended after the defeat. The Greek referee Kosto Cicis praised his commitment in defending his goal against the Turkish flood that witnessed most of the Iraqi players fall in despair and defeat except for Wadud who continued to fight, “standing tall as a large oak tree against the strong winds and stormy sky.”

Khalil went onto play for the Austrian Police Club Polizei SV Wien and then after four years in Vienna he left for West Germany to work at the Iraqi Embassy in Bonn and formed his own football side from the local Arab community. He remarked, "I formed two teams from the Arab community, the first a football team and the second a basketball team in the name of the Arab Youth. The two teams fought dozens of matches with amateur club teams, and the two sides continued up until the year 1959, as I got older and was busy with the preoccupation of life." Khalil returned to Baghdad in his later life and married but did not have any children. Nothing is known about his whereabouts; however, he is believed to have died after 2006.
