= Bennie Lands =

Canadian basketball player

Benjamin Lands (February 22, 1921 – January 13, 2014) was a Canadian basketball player who competed in the 1948 Summer Olympics. Lands was born in Montreal. He was part of the Canadian basketball team which finished ninth in the Olympic tournament. Lands was affiliated with the Montréal Young Men's Hebrew Association.

== Early life ==
Lands was born in Montreal, Quebec but lived in Winnipeg.
