= Tommy Malone (basketball) =

Irish basketball player

Personal information
- Nationality: Irish
- Born: 29 July 1918; New Ross, Ireland
- Died: 16 June 1968 (aged 49)

Sport
- Sport: Basketball

Tommy Malone (29 July 1918 – 16 June 1968) was an Irish basketball player. He competed in the men's tournament at the 1948 Summer Olympics.
