= Robert Makzoumi =

Egyptian basketball player

Personal information
- Nationality: Egyptian
- Born: 1918; Cairo, Egypt
- Died: 19 May 2006 (aged 87–88); Latakia, Syria

Sport
- Sport: Basketball

Robert Makzoumi (1918 – 19 May 2006) was an Egyptian basketball player. He competed in the men's tournament at the 1948 Summer Olympics.
