= Dave Campbell (basketball) =

Canadian basketball player

David Hector Campbell (September 11, 1925 – December 28, 2015) was a Canadian basketball player who competed in the 1948 Summer Olympics. Campbell was born in Vancouver. He was part of the Canadian basketball team, which finished ninth in the Olympic tournament. He also served as a justice of the British Columbia Supreme Court from 1990 to 1996.
