= Alexander Eke =

British basketball player

Alexander Frederick "Alex" Eke (October 9, 1912 – January 28, 2004) was a British basketball player who competed in the 1948 Summer Olympics. He was born in Westminster.

Eke was part of the British basketball team, which finished twentieth in the 1948 Olympic tournament.
