= André Barrais =

French basketball player (1920–2004)

Olympic medal record

Men's basketball
Silver medal – second place	1948 London	Team competition

André René Félix Barrais (22 February 1920 – 15 January 2004) was a French basketball player. He competed in the 1948 Summer Olympics, winning a silver medal.

Barrais was born on 22 February 1920 in Levallois-Perret. He died in Plougastel-Daoulas on 15 January 2004, at the age of 83.
