= Lionel Price =

British basketball player (1927–2019)

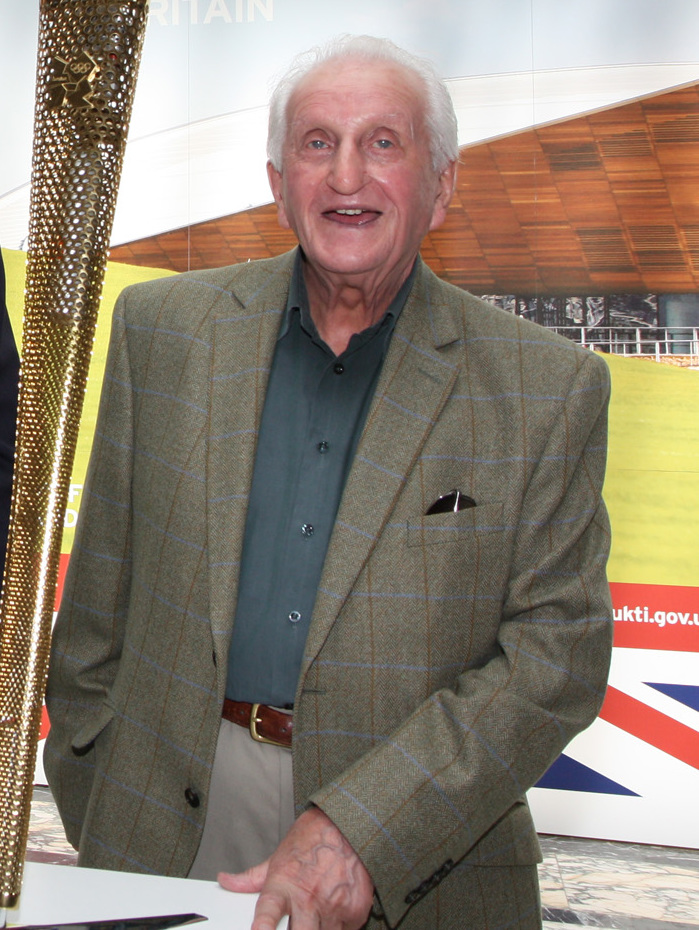
Lionel Price on 6 August 2012.

Lionel Price (6 February 1927 – 10 January 2019) was a British basketball player who competed in the 1948 Summer Olympics. Born in the Marylebone area of London's West End, he, at age 21, became the youngest member of the British basketball team, which finished twentieth in the Olympic tournament.
