= René Dérency =

French basketball player (1925–1954)

Olympic medal record

Men's basketball
| Silver medal – second place | 1948 London | Team competition |

René Dérency (27 May 1925 – 18 October 1954) was a French basketball player who competed in the 1948 Summer Olympics. He was part of the French basketball team, which won the silver medal.

Dérency died in a car collision on 18 October 1954, at the age of 29.
