= Michel Bonnevie =

French basketball player (1921–2018)

Olympic medal record

Men's basketball
Silver medal – second place	1948 London	Team competition

Michel Bonnevie (19 November 1921 – 6 September 2018) was a French basketball player who competed in the 1948 Summer Olympics. He was part of the French national basketball team, which won the silver medal.
