= Chua Bonhuaa =

Chinese basketball player (1920–1976)

Personal information
- Nationality: Chinese
- Born: 1920
- Died: 20 February 1976 (aged 55–56); Taipei, Taiwan

Sport
- Sport: Basketball

Chua Bonhuaa (1920 – 20 February 1976) was a Chinese basketball player. He competed in the men's tournament at the 1948 Summer Olympics.
