= Reid Mitchell =

Canadian basketball player

James Reid Mitchell (October 6, 1926 – February 24, 2012) was a Canadian basketball player who competed in the 1948 Summer Olympics. He was part of the Canadian basketball team, which finished ninth in the Olympic tournament. Mitchell was born in Anyox, British Columbia.
