= Fabio Ruíz =

Cuban basketball player (born 1927)

Personal information
- Born: 7 August 1927; Havana, Cuba
- Died: before 2010

Sport
- Sport: Basketball

Fabio Ruíz (7 August 1927 – before 2010) was a Cuban basketball player. He competed in the men's tournament at the 1948 Summer Olympics and the 1952 Summer Olympics. Ruíz died prior to 2010.
