= Emilio López (basketball) =

Mexican basketball player (born 1923)

Personal information
- Full name: Emilio López Enríquez
- Born: 23 August 1923 San Luis Potosí City, Mexico

Sport
- Sport: Basketball

Emilio López Enríquez (born 23 August 1923) is a former Mexican basketball player. He competed in the men's tournament at the 1948 Summer Olympics and the 1952 Summer Olympics.
