= Enrique Parra =

Chilean basketball player (1925–2003)

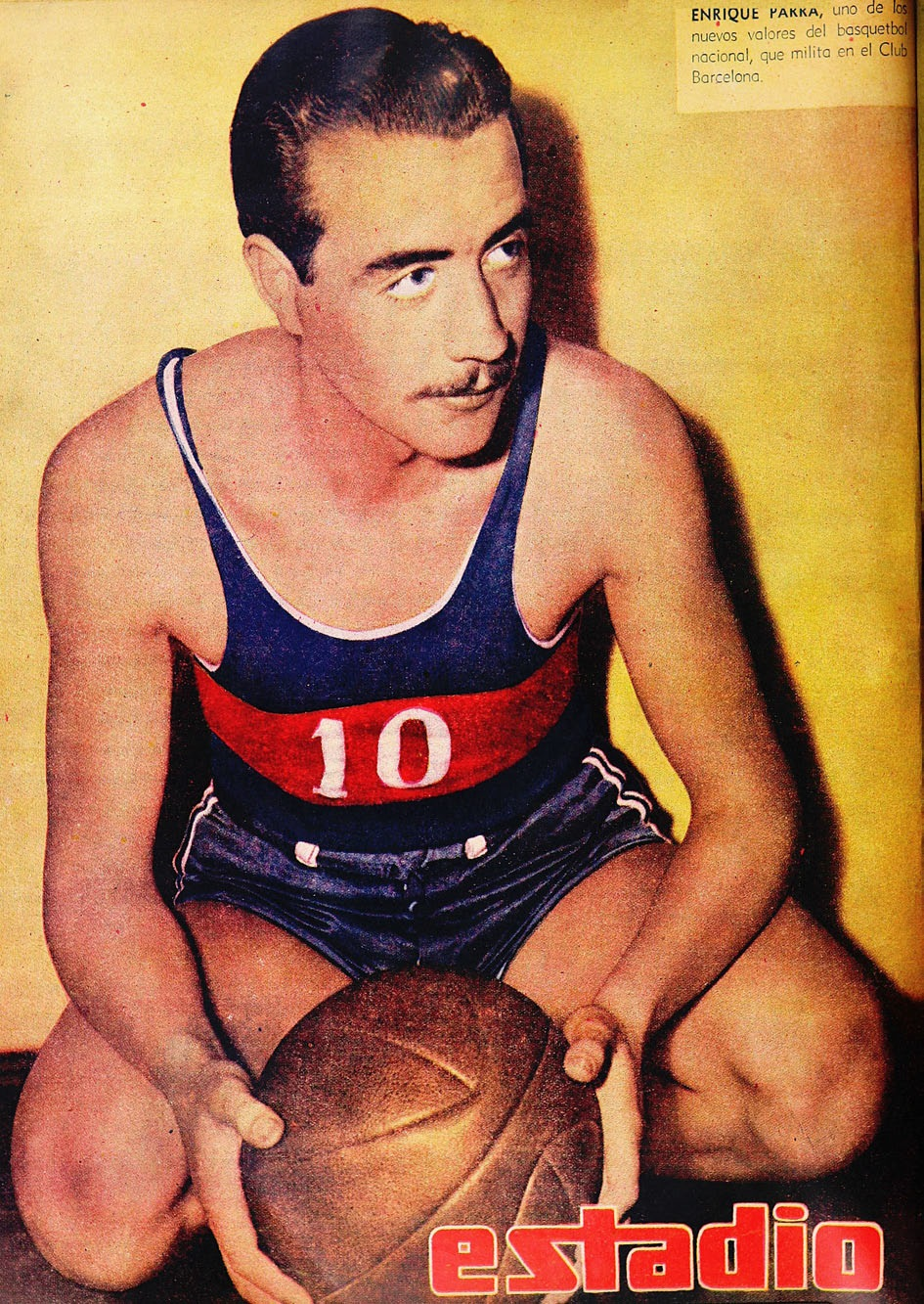

Personal information
- Full name: Enrique Valentín Parra Rojas
- Born: 17 August 1925 Santiago, Chile
- Died: 15 March 2003 (aged 77) Santiago, Chile

Sport
- Sport: Basketball

Enrique Parra (17 August 1925 – 15 March 2003) was a Chilean basketball player. He competed in the men's tournament at the 1948 Summer Olympics.
