= József Kozma (basketball) =

Hungarian basketball player

Personal information
- Nationality: Hungarian
- Born: 24 March 1925; Zalaegerszeg, Hungary
- Died: 25 October 1994 (aged 69); Budapest, Hungary

Sport
- Sport: Basketball

József Kozma (24 March 1925 – 25 October 1994) was a Hungarian basketball player. He competed in the men's tournament at the 1948 Summer Olympics.
