= Giovanni Nesti =

Italian basketball player (1922–2011)

Personal information
- Nationality: Italian
- Born: 23 September 1922; Livorno, Italy
- Died: 20 March 2011 (aged 88); Turin, Italy

Sport
- Sport: Basketball

Giovanni Nesti (23 September 1922 – 20 March 2011) was an Italian basketball player. He competed in the men's tournament at the 1948 Summer Olympics.
