= Doodie Bloomfield =

Canadian basketball player

Personal information
- Full name: David Donald Bloomfield
- Born: 8 August 1918; Montreal, Quebec, Canada
- Died: 14 November 1950 (aged 32); Montreal, Quebec, Canada

Sport
- Sport: Basketball

David Donald "Doodie" Bloomfield (8 August 1918 – 14 November 1950) was a Canadian basketball player. He competed in the men's tournament at the 1948 Summer Olympics.

== Personal life ==
Bloomfield served in the Royal Canadian Air Force during the Second World War.
