= Bill Bell (basketball) =

Canadian Olympic basketball player

William James Bell
Personal information
- Born: 1927; Revelstoke, British Columbia, Canada
- Died: 28 November 2016 (aged 87–88); Victoria, British Columbia, Canada
- Listed height: 6 ft 4 in (1.93 m)

Career information
- College: UBC
- Position: Center

William James Bell (1927 – 28 November 2016) was a Canadian basketball player. He competed in the men's tournament at the 1948 Summer Olympics. He played college basketball for the University of British Columbia where he also earned his medical degree.
