= Andrés Mitrovic =

Chilean basketball player (1921–2008)

Personal information
- Born: 21 May 1921; Iquique, Chile
- Died: 12 July 2008 (aged 87)

Sport
- Sport: Basketball

Juan Andrés Mitrovic Guic (21 May 1921 – 13 July 2008) was a Chilean basketball player. He competed in the men's tournament at the 1948 Summer Olympics.
