= Hamid Ahmed =

Iraqi basketball player

Personal information
- Nationality: Iraqi

Sport
- Sport: Basketball

Hamid Ahmed was an Iraqi basketball player. He competed in the men's tournament at the 1948 Summer Olympics, where Iraq lost all six of their games.
