= Ezio Mantelli =

Italian basketball player (1924–2002)

Personal information
- Nationality: Italian
- Born: 10 February 1924; San Michele, Italy
- Died: 27 June 2002 (aged 78)

Sport
- Sport: Basketball

Ezio Mantelli (10 February 1924 – 27 June 2002) was an Italian basketball player. He competed in the men's tournament at the 1948 Summer Olympics.
