= Kadir Irfan =

Iraqi basketball player

Personal information
- Nationality: Iraqi

Sport
- Sport: Basketball

Kadir Irfan was an Iraqi basketball player. He competed in the men's tournament at the 1948 Summer Olympics.
