= José Cabrera (basketball) =

Mexican basketball player (1921–2016)

Personal information
- Born: 22 January 1921 Nogales, Sonora, Mexico
- Died: 29 July 2016 (aged 95)

Sport
- Sport: Basketball

José Cabrera (22 January 1921 – 29 July 2016) was a Mexican basketball player. He competed in the men's tournament at the 1948 Summer Olympics and the 1952 Summer Olympics.
