= Affonso Évora =

Brazilian basketball player

Personal information
- Born: 29 August 1918 Rio de Janeiro, Brazil
- Died: 2 August 2008 (aged 89) Petrópolis, Rio de Janeiro, Brazil
Medals
Men's basketball
Representing Brazil
Olympic Games
Bronze medal – third place	1948 London	Team competition

Affonso de Azevedo Évora (29 August 1918 – 2 August 2008), also commonly known as Fon-Fon, was a Brazilian basketball player who competed in the 1948 Summer Olympics. There he won the bronze medal with the national team under the guidance of head coach Moacyr Daiuto.
