= Mendy Morein =

Canadian basketball player (1926–2003)

Personal information
- Full name: Mortimer Mendel Morein
- Born: 22 May 1926; Montreal, Quebec, Canada
- Died: 1 April 2003 (aged 76); Palm Beach, Florida, United States

Sport
- Sport: Basketball

Mortimer Mendel "Mendy" Morein (22 May 1926 – 1 April 2003) was a Canadian basketball player. He competed in the men's tournament at the 1948 Summer Olympics.
