= Néstor Antón =

Uruguayan basketball player (1924–1952)

Personal information
- Born: 19 April 1924; Montevideo, Uruguay
- Died: 16 May 1952 (aged 28); Montevideo, Uruguay

Sport
- Sport: Basketball

Néstor Fausto Antón Giudice (19 April 1924 – 16 May 1952) was a Uruguayan basketball player. He competed in the men's tournament at the 1948 Summer Olympics. António died on 16 May 1952, at the age of 28.
