= Ronald Legg =

British basketball player

Personal information
- Full name: Ronald Howard Legg
- Nationality: British
- Born: 25 March 1928; Birmingham, England
- Died: 24 March 2010 (aged 81)

Sport
- Sport: Basketball

Ronald Howard Legg (25 March 1928 – 24 March 2010) was a British basketball player. He competed in the men's tournament at the 1948 Summer Olympics.
