= Frank Cole (basketball) =

British basketball player

Personal information
- Nationality: British
- Born: 19 August 1912; Birmingham, Warwickshire, England
- Died: 26 November 1995 (aged 83); Solihull, West Midlands, England

Sport
- Sport: Basketball

Frank Cole (9 August 1912 – 26 November 1995) was a British basketball player. He competed in the men's tournament at the 1948 Summer Olympics.
