= László Novakovszky =

Hungarian basketball player

Personal information
- Nationality: Hungarian
- Born: 27 December 1923; Budapest, Hungary
- Died: 12 September 2008 (aged 84)

Sport
- Sport: Basketball

László Novakovszky (27 December 1923 – 12 September 2008) was a Hungarian basketball player. He competed in the men's tournament at the 1948 Summer Olympics.
