= Casimiro García =

Cuban basketball player (born 1930)

Personal information
- Nationality: Cuban
- Born: 12 April 1930; Asturias, Spain
- Died: Unknown

Sport
- Sport: Basketball

Casimiro Ignacio García Artime (12 April 1930, date of death unknown) was a Cuban basketball player. He competed in the men's tournament at the 1948 Summer Olympics, scoring 23 points in 4 games, and the 1952 Summer Olympics, scoring 25 points in 6 games.
