= Gustavo Magariños =

Uruguayan basketball player

Personal information
- Born: 31 December 1922; Montevideo, Uruguay
- Died: 17 January 2014 (aged 91)

Sport
- Sport: Basketball

Gustavo Magariños Morales de los Rios (31 December 1922 – 17 January 2014) was a Uruguayan basketball player and diplomat. He competed in the men's tournament at the 1948 Summer Olympics. After retiring as a basketball player, he developed a career as a diplomat. He was Uruguayan ambassador to Argentina between 1975 and 1978, during the military dictatorships of both countries.
