= Nev Munro =

Canadian basketball player

Personal information
- Nationality: Canadian
- Born: 22 July 1927; Vancouver, British Columbia, Canada
- Died: 31 August 2003 (aged 76); Vancouver, British Columbia, Canada

Sport
- Sport: Basketball

Nev Munro (22 July 1927 – 31 August 2003) was a Canadian basketball player. He competed in the men's tournament at the 1948 Summer Olympics.
