= Claude Chevalley (basketball) =

Swiss basketball player (born c. 1927)

Personal information
- Nationality: Swiss
- Born: c. 1927

Sport
- Sport: Basketball

Claude Chevalley (born c. 1927, date of death unknown) was a Swiss basketball player. He competed in the men's tournament at the 1948 Summer Olympics.
