= Jorge Nuré =

Argentine basketball player

Personal information
- Nationality: Argentine
- Born: 24 September 1926
- Died: 31 August 2011 (aged 84)

Sport
- Sport: Basketball

Jorge Nuré (24 September 1926 – 31 August 2011) was an Argentine basketball player who competed in the 1948 Summer Olympics when they finished 15th.
