= Jean Tribolet =

Swiss basketball player (1926/1927–2012)

Personal information
- Nationality: Swiss
- Born: 1926 or 1927
- Died: 28 March 2012 (aged 85)

Sport
- Sport: Basketball

Jean Tribolet (1926 or 1927 – 28 March 2012) was a Swiss basketball player. He competed in the men's tournament at the 1948 Summer Olympics. Tribolet died on 28 March 2012, at the age of 85.
