= Zoltán Krenický =

Czech basketball player

Personal information
- Nationality: Slovak
- Born: 16 November 1925; Klokočov, Czechoslovakia
- Died: 22 June 1976 (aged 50); Košice, Czechoslovakia

Sport
- Sport: Basketball

Zoltán Krenický (16 November 1925 – 22 June 1976) was a Slovak basketball player. He competed in the men's tournament at the 1948 Summer Olympics.
