= Rolando Hammer =

Chilean basketball player (1921–1987)

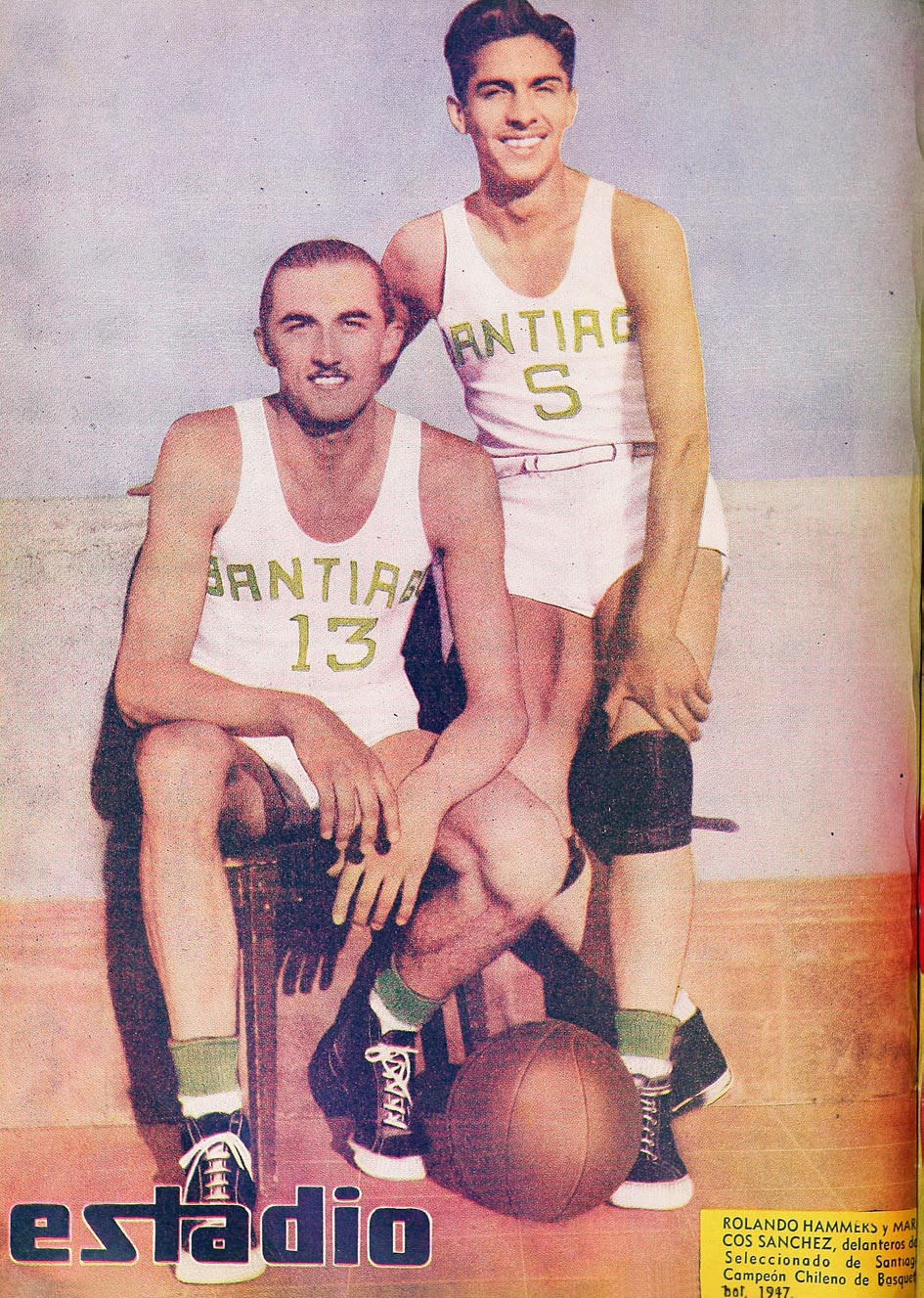
- Rolando Hammer and Marcos Sánchez.

Personal information
- Nationality: Chilean
- Born: 13 June 1921
- Died: 16 January 1987 (aged 65)

Sport
- Sport: Basketball

Rolando Hammer Casadio (13 June 1921 – 16 January 1987) was a Chilean basketball player. He competed in the men's tournament at the 1948 Summer Olympics.
