= Ramón Wiltz =

Cuban basketball player (1926–2022)

Personal information
- Born: 12 December 1926; Havana, Cuba
- Died: 27 May 2022 (aged 95); Miami, Florida, U.S.

Sport
- Sport: Basketball

Ramón Wiltz (12 December 1926 – 27 May 2022) was a Cuban basketball player. He competed in the men's tournament at the 1948 Summer Olympics and the 1952 Summer Olympics. Wiltz died in Miami, Florida on 27 May 2022, at the age of 95.
