= Pedro Otero =

Cuban basketball player

Personal information
- Full name: Pedro Manuel Otero Vázquez
- Born: 20 June 1920; Havana, Cuba

Sport
- Sport: Basketball

Pedro Otero (born 20 June 1920) was a Cuban basketball player. He competed in the men's tournament at the 1948 Summer Olympics.
