= Jiří Siegel =

Czech architect and basketball player

Personal information
- Nationality: Czech
- Born: 5 March 1927 Prague, Czechoslovakia
- Died: 16 June 2012 (aged 85)

Sport
- Sport: Basketball

Jiří Siegel (5 March 1927 – 16 June 2012) was a Czech architect and basketball player.

He studied at the Architecture University in Prague. He was playing basketball during his university studies, he even competed in the men's tournament at the 1948 Summer Olympics.

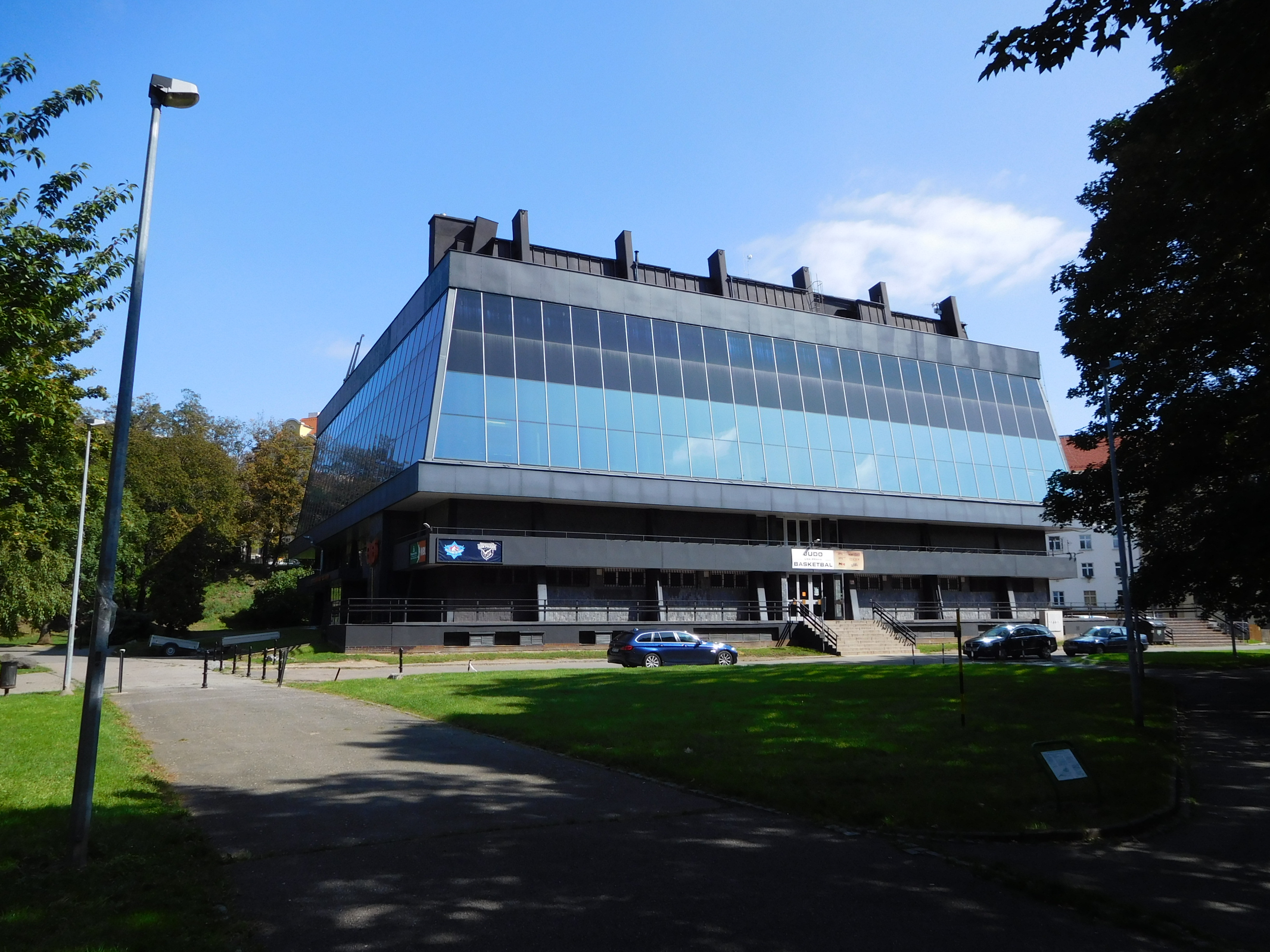
Sports hall Folimanka in Prague

As an architect, he was employed by Sportprojekt Praha. He also designed several sports buildings, like Sports Hall Folimanka in Prague.
