= István Lovrics =

Hungarian basketball player

Personal information
- Nationality: Hungarian
- Born: 6 July 1927; Pécs, Hungary
- Died: 13 April 1990 (aged 62); Toronto, Ontario, Canada

Sport
- Sport: Basketball

István Lovrics (6 July 1927 – 13 April 1990) was a Hungarian basketball player. He competed in the men's tournament at the 1948 Summer Olympics.
