= Robert Norris (basketball) =

British basketball player (1924–2018)

Robert Norris (20 August 1924 – 4 January 2018) was a British basketball player who competed in the 1948 Summer Olympics.

Norris was born in Santa Rosa, California in August 1924 to English parents. In his early years he lived between the United States and England. During World War II, he served in the U.S. Army. Norris returned to the States following his sports career, residing in Calabasas, California from the 1980s before moving to Medford, Oregon, where he was still based in July 2012. He died in Oregon in January 2018 at the age of 93.
