= Gérald Piaget =

Swiss basketball player (1923/1924–2006)

Personal information
- Nationality: Swiss
- Born: 1923 or 1924
- Died: 7 February 2006 (aged 82)

Sport
- Sport: Basketball

Gérald Piaget (1923 or 1924 – 7 February 2006) was a Swiss basketball player. He competed in the men's tournament at the 1948 Summer Olympics. Piaget died on 7 February 2006, at the age of 82.
