= Augustin Bernaer =

Belgian basketball player (born 1926)

Personal information
- Nationality: Belgian
- Born: 8 May 1926; Brussels, Belgium

Sport
- Sport: Basketball

Augustin Bernaer (born 8 May 1926) was a Belgian basketball player. He competed in the men's tournament at the 1948 Summer Olympics.
