= Ctirad Benáček =

Czech basketball player (1924–1999)

Personal information
- Nationality: Czech
- Born: 8 September 1924; Bratislava, Czechoslovakia
- Died: 1 December 1999 (aged 75); Auckland, New Zealand

Sport
- Sport: Basketball

Ctirad Benáček (8 September 1924 – 1 December 1999) was a Czech basketball player. He competed in the men's tournament at the 1948 Summer Olympics. He died in Auckland, New Zealand on 1 December 1999, at the age of 75.
