= Arturo Ruffa =

Argentine basketball player

Arturo Ruffa (December 25, 1926, in Tucumán – October 2004) was an Argentine basketball player who competed in the 1948 Summer Olympics when Argentina finished 15th.
