= Rodolfo Díaz (basketball) =

Mexican basketball player (1918–1993)

Personal information
- Born: 7 May 1918; Mexico City, Mexico
- Died: 22 June 1993 (aged 75)

Sport
- Sport: Basketball

Rodolfo Díaz (7 May 1918 – 22 June 1993) was a Mexican basketball player. He competed in the men's tournament at the 1948 Summer Olympics.
