= Josué Santos =

Mexican basketball player (1916–2007)

Personal information
- Born: 1 July 1916; Ciudad Juárez, Mexico
- Died: 1 April 2007 (aged 90); Ciudad Juárez, Mexico

Sport
- Sport: Basketball

Josué Santos (1 July 1916 – 1 April 2007) was a Mexican basketball player. He competed in the men's tournament at the 1948 Summer Olympics.
