= Jiří Drvota =

Czech basketball player

Personal information
- Nationality: Czech
- Born: 30 November 1922
- Died: 30 November 2007 (aged 85)

Sport
- Sport: Basketball

Jiří Drvota (30 November 1922 – 30 November 2007) was a Czech basketball player. He competed in the men's tournament at the 1948 Summer Olympics.
