= Jorge Cardiel =

Mexican basketball player

Personal information
- Full name: José Jorge Cardiel Gaytán
- Born: 23 April 1924; Mexico City, Mexico

Sport
- Sport: Basketball

Jorge Cardiel (born 23 April 1924) was a Mexican basketball player. He competed in the men's tournament at the 1948 Summer Olympics and the 1952 Summer Olympics.
