= Héctor Ruiz (basketball) =

Uruguayan basketball player (born c. 1921)

Personal information
- Nationality: Uruguayan
- Born: c. 1921

Sport
- Sport: Basketball

Héctor Ruiz (born c. 1921) was a Uruguayan basketball player. He competed in the men's tournament at the 1948 Summer Olympics.
