= Trevor Davies =

British basketball player (1928–2012)

Personal information
- Full name: Trevor Cecil Davies
- Nationality: British
- Born: 1928 London, England
- Died: 22 September 2012 (aged 83–84) Sutton, London, England

Sport
- Sport: Basketball

Trevor Cecil Davies (1928 – 22 September 2012) was a British basketball player.

== Professional career ==
Davies competed in the men's tournament at the 1948 Summer Olympics.
