= Václav Krása =

Czech basketball player

Personal information
- Nationality: Czech
- Born: 8 March 1932; Bratislava, Czechoslovakia
- Died: 19 November 2003 (aged 71)

Sport
- Sport: Basketball

Václav Krása (8 March 1932 – 19 November 2003) was a Czech basketball player. He competed in the men's tournament at the 1948 Summer Olympics.
