= Pierre Albrecht (basketball, born 1926) =

Swiss basketball player (1926–1971)

Personal information
- Nationality: Swiss
- Born: 1 January 1926; New York City, United States
- Died: 12 December 1971 (aged 45); Bournemouth, England

Sport
- Sport: Basketball

Pierre Albrecht (1 January 1926 – 12 December 1971) was a Swiss basketball player. He competed in the men's tournament at the 1948 Summer Olympics.
