= Miguel Llaneras =

Cuban basketball player

Personal information
- Born: 5 August 1926; Havana, Cuba

Sport
- Sport: Basketball

Miguel Llaneras (born 5 August 1926) was a Cuban basketball player. He competed in the men's tournament at the 1948 Summer Olympics.
