= Hossein Jabbarzadegan =

Iranian basketball player

Personal information
- Nationality: Iranian
- Died: July 1997

Sport
- Sport: Basketball

Hossein Jabbarzadegan (Persian: حسین جبارزادگان; died July 1997) was an Iranian basketball player. He competed in the men's tournament at the 1948 Summer Olympics.
