= José Llanusa =

Cuban basketball player

José Llanusa Gobel
Personal information
- Born: 11 August 1925; Havana, Cuba
- Died: 14 July 2007 (aged 81); Havana, Cuba

Sport
- Sport: Basketball

José Llanusa Gobel (11 August 1925 – 14 July 2007) was a Cuban basketball player and politician. He competed in the men's tournament at the 1948 Summer Olympics and the 1950 Central American and Caribbean Games where he won a bronze medal. He was the first director of the Instituto Nacional de Deportes, Educación Fisica y Recreación (National Institute of Sports, Physical Education and Recreation) of Cuba in 1961, and was also Minister of Education, vice president of the Council of Ministers and member of the National Assembly of People’s Power in the government of Fidel Castro.
