= Bernard Dutoit =

Swiss basketball player (1923–2000)

Personal information
- Nationality: Swiss
- Born: 1923
- Died: 23 October 2000 (aged 76–77)

Sport
- Sport: Basketball

Bernard Dutoit (1923 – 23 October 2000) was a Swiss basketball player. He competed in the men's tournament at the 1948 Summer Olympics. He died on 23 October 2000, in his 76th year.
