= Bobby Scarr =

Canadian basketball player (1926–2001)

Personal information
- Full name: Robert John Scarr
- Nationality: Canadian
- Born: 13 August 1926 Vancouver, British Columbia, Canada
- Died: 16 February 2001 (aged 74) Vancouver, British Columbia, Canada

Sport
- Sport: Basketball

Robert John Scarr (13 August 1926 – 16 February 2001) was a Canadian basketball player. He competed in the men's tournament at the 1948 Summer Olympics.
