= Eduardo Folle =

Uruguayan basketball player

Personal information
- Born: 28 April 1922 Montevideo, Uruguay
- Died: 2 August 1994 (aged 72)

Sport
- Sport: Basketball

Eduardo Ángel Folle Colombo (28 April 1922 – 2 August 1994) was a Uruguayan basketball player. He competed in the men's tournament at the 1948 Summer Olympics.
