= Manuel Ledesma =

Chilean basketball player (1920–2001)

Personal information
- Born: 12 August 1920; Huara, Chile
- Died: 22 June 2001 (aged 80); Valparaíso, Chile

Sport
- Sport: Basketball

Manuel "El Indio" Ledesma Barrales (12 August 1920 – 22 June 2001) was a Chilean basketball player. He competed in the men's tournament at the 1948 Summer Olympics.
