= Ole Bakken =

Canadian basketball player

Personal information
- Nationality: Canadian
- Born: 24 May 1922 Harstad, Norway
- Died: 30 January 1992 (aged 69) Toronto, Ontario, Canada

Sport
- Sport: Basketball

Ole Bakken (24 May 1922 – 30 January 1992) was a Canadian basketball player. He competed in the men's tournament at the 1948 Summer Olympics.
