= Frank Lavernia =

Cuban basketball player

Personal information
- Born: 3 April 1918; Camagüey, Cuba
- Died: 19 April 2005 (aged 87); Miami, Florida, United States

Sport
- Sport: Basketball

Frank Lavernia (3 April 1918 – 19 April 2005) was a Cuban basketball player. He competed in the men's tournament at the 1948 Summer Olympics.
