= Fernando Rojas (basketball) =

Mexican basketball player 1921–2016

Personal information
- Born: 2 August 1921; Orizaba, Mexico
- Died: 26 December 2016 (aged 95)

Sport
- Sport: Basketball

Fernando Rojas (2 August 1921 – 26 December 2016) was a Mexican basketball player. He competed in the men's tournament at the 1948 Summer Olympics and the 1952 Summer Olympics.
