= Jackie Robinson (basketball, born 1927) =

American basketball player (1927–2022)

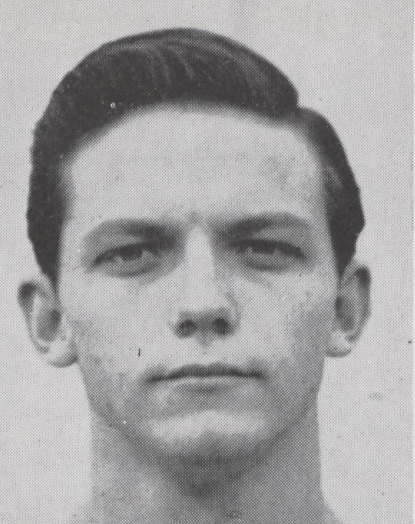
- Robinson from the 1948 Round-Up

Personal information
- Born: April 26, 1927 Fort Worth, Texas, U.S.
- Died: February 8, 2022 (aged 94) Augusta, Georgia, U.S.
- Listed height: 6 ft 0 in (1.83 m)
- Listed weight: 180 lb (82 kg)

Career information
- High school: R. L. Paschal (Fort Worth, Texas)
- College: Baylor (1945–1948)
- Position: Point guard

Career highlights
- 2× Second-team All-American – Helms (1946, 1948); 3× First-team All-SWC (1946–1948)
Medals
Men's basketball
Representing the United States
Olympic Games
Gold medal – first place	1948 London	Team competition

Robert Jackson Robinson (April 26, 1927 – February 8, 2022), nicknamed "Jack" or "Jackie", was an American Baptist pastor, theologian and college basketball player who competed at the 1948 Summer Olympics.

== Basketball ==
A native of Fort Worth, Texas, Robinson was a graduate of Baylor University in Waco Texas. Afterward, he studied at Southwestern Seminary, Temple University and the New College, University of Edinburgh in Scotland, and obtained a doctorate in theology. Robinson was an All-American basketball player, 1946–1948, while at Baylor University. Awarded the Jack Dempsey outstanding athlete award in 1947, he won a gold medal as an outstanding guard on the 1948 Olympic basketball team in London. During the Olympics he was among a group of athletes who went to Buckingham Palace and were formally presented to the King, the Queen and the then Queen Mother. Subsequently the BBC broadcast his recollections of the event which included informal meetings with the Princesses Margaret and Elizabeth and later an extended informal conversation with the King during which Robinson corrected the King's misapprehension as to the relative statures of California and Texas. A recording is still extant.

== Career ==
Between 1953 and 1974, Robinson was minister of First Baptist Church of Augusta, a church of some 3,600 members, where the Southern Baptist Convention was organized in 1845.

== Personal life and death ==
Robinson died in Augusta, Georgia, on February 8, 2022, at the age of 94.
