= Isaac Alfaro =

Mexican basketball player (1919–1999)

Personal information
- Full name: José Isaac Alfaro Loza
- Nationality: Mexican
- Born: 3 June 1919
- Died: 23 February 1999 (aged 79) Mexico City, Mexico

Sport
- Sport: Basketball

José Isaac Alfaro Loza (3 June 1919 – 23 February 1999) was a Mexican basketball player. He competed in the men's tournament at the 1948 Summer Olympics. Alfaro died in Mexico City on 23 February 1999, at the age of 79.
