= Tomás Vio =

Argentine basketball player

Personal information
- Nationality: Argentine
- Born: 25 July 1921
- Died: 5 December 2001 (aged 80)

Sport
- Sport: Basketball

Tomás Vio (25 July 1921 – 5 December 2001) was an Argentine basketball player who competed in the 1948 Summer Olympics when they finished 15th. He played six games in his Olympic career.
