= Robert Geiser =

Swiss basketball player (1919–1981)

Personal information
- Full name: Robert Jean Geiser
- Nationality: Swiss
- Born: 1919 Geneva, Switzerland
- Died: 17 December 1981 (aged 61–62) Collonge-Bellerive, Geneva, Switzerland

Sport
- Sport: Basketball

Robert Jean Geiser (1919 – 17 December 1981) was a Swiss basketball player. He competed in the men's tournament at the 1948 Summer Olympics. Geiser died in Collonge-Bellerive on 17 December 1981.
