= Zdeněk Chlup =

Czech basketball player

Personal information
- Nationality: Czech
- Born: 28 September 1922; Brno, Czechoslovakia
- Died: 14 April 2002 (aged 79); Brno, Czech Republic

Sport
- Sport: Basketball

Zdeněk Chlup (28 September 1922 – 14 April 2002) was a Czech basketball player. He competed in the men's tournament at the 1948 Summer Olympics.
