= Miguel Diab =

Uruguayan basketball player (1920–1994)

Personal information
- Nationality: Uruguayan
- Born: 16 September 1920; Buenos Aires, Argentina
- Died: 20 April 1994 (aged 73)

Sport
- Sport: Basketball

Miguel Carlos Diab Figoli (16 September 1920 – 20 April 1994) was a Uruguayan basketball player. He competed in the men's tournament at the 1948 Summer Olympics.
