= Attila Timár-Geng =

Hungarian basketball player

Personal information
- Nationality: Hungarian
- Born: 25 May 1924; Szeged, Hungary
- Died: 15 January 2004 (aged 79); Budapest, Hungary

Sport
- Sport: Basketball

Attila Timár-Geng (25 May 1924 – 15 January 2004) was a Hungarian basketball player. He competed in the men's tournament at the 1948 Summer Olympics.
