= Claude Landini =

Swiss basketball player (1926–2021)

Personal information
- Nationality: Swiss
- Born: 1 March 1926; Geneva, Switzerland
- Died: 30 May 2021 (aged 95); Geneva, Switzerland

Sport
- Sport: Basketball

Claude Landini (1 March 1926 – 30 May 2021) was a Swiss basketball player. He competed in the men's tournament at the 1948 Summer Olympics.
