= Houshang Rafatjah =

Iranian basketball player

Personal information
- Nationality: Iranian

Sport
- Sport: Basketball

Houshang Rafatjah (Persian: هوشنگ رفعت‌جاه) was an Iranian basketball player. He competed in the men's tournament at the 1948 Summer Olympics.
