= Alfredo Faget =

Cuban basketball player

Personal information
- Nationality: Cuban
- Born: 1 July 1923
- Died: 18 July 2003 (aged 80); Guaynabo, Puerto Rico

Sport
- Sport: Basketball

Alfredo Faget (1 July 1923 – 18 July 2003) was a Cuban basketball player. He competed in the men's tournament at the 1948 Summer Olympics and the 1952 Summer Olympics.
