= Louis Van De Goor =

Belgian basketball player

Personal information
- Nationality: Belgian
- Born: 25 December 1915; Brussels, Belgium

Sport
- Sport: Basketball

Louis Van De Goor (born 25 December 1915, date of death unknown) was a Belgian basketball player. He competed in the men's tournament at the 1948 Summer Olympics.
