= Awni Kanaan =

Iraqi basketball player (born c. 1928)

Personal information
- Nationality: Iraqi
- Born: c. 1928

Sport
- Sport: Basketball

Awni Kanaan (born c. 1928) was an Iraqi basketball player. He competed in the men's tournament at the 1948 Summer Olympics, where he played in 6 games. He played in position 22 and also played for Baghdad College.
