= Raúl García (basketball) =

Cuban basketball player

Personal information
- Nationality: Cuban
- Born: 15 September 1924 Littleton, New Hampshire, U.S.
- Died: 3 May 2013 (aged 88) Miami, Florida, U.S.

Sport
- Sport: Basketball

Raúl García-Ordóñez (15 September 1924 – 3 May 2013) was a Cuban basketball player. He competed in the men's tournament at the 1948 Summer Olympics. His brother, Carlos García-Ordóñez, competed in the men's tournament at the 1952 Summer Olympics.
