= Paddy Sheriff =

Irish basketball player (1926–1990)

Personal information
- Nationality: Irish
- Born: 15 October 1926; Dublin, Ireland
- Died: 27 November 1990 (aged 64); Mullingar, Ireland

Sport
- Sport: Basketball

Paddy Sheriff (15 October 1926 – 27 November 1990) was an Irish basketball player. He competed in the men's tournament at the 1948 Summer Olympics.

In 1990, he died in a road traffic incident along with his son Padraig at Gneevebawn Hill near Tyrrellspass, County Westmeath, while driving to Dublin from Galway.
