= Paddy Crehan =

Irish basketball player (1920–1992)

Personal information
- Nationality: Irish
- Born: 18 February 1920 County Clare, Ireland
- Died: 11 February 1992 (aged 71) Dublin, Ireland

Sport
- Sport: Basketball

Paddy Crehan (18 February 1920 – 11 February 1992) was an Irish basketball player. He competed in the men's tournament at the 1948 Summer Olympics.
