= Jim Flynn (basketball) =

Irish basketball player

Personal information
- Nationality: Irish
- Born: 1921; Waterford, Ireland
- Died: 12 March 2006 (aged 84–85); Fermoy, Ireland

Sport
- Sport: Basketball

Jim Flynn (1921 – 12 March 2006) was an Irish basketball player. He competed in the men's tournament at the 1948 Summer Olympics. He was one of 12 service members that were chosen to compete at that Olympics on the Irish basketball team.
