= Luis Sánchez (basketball) =

Peruvian basketball player (1916–2001)

Personal information
- Full name: Luis Alberto Sánchez Maquiavello
- Nationality: Peruvian
- Born: October 1916 Lima, Peru
- Died: October 2001 (aged 85) Peru

Sport
- Sport: Basketball

Luis Alberto Sánchez Maquiavello (October 1916 – May 2001) was a Peruvian basketball player. He competed in the men's tournament at the 1948 Summer Olympics.
