= Rodolfo Soracco =

Peruvian basketball player

Personal information
- Born: 27 July 1927; Lima, Peru
- Died: 25 October 2018 (aged 91)

Sport
- Sport: Basketball

Jorge Rodolfo Soracco Ríos (27 July 1927 – 25 October 2018) was a Peruvian basketball player. He competed in the men's tournament at the 1948 Summer Olympics.
