= Dermot Sheriff =

Irish basketball player

Personal information
- Nationality: Irish
- Born: 10 August 1920 Dublin, Ireland
- Died: 10 May 1993 (aged 72) Athlone, Ireland

Sport
- Sport: Basketball

Dermot Joseph Sheriff (10 August 1920 – 10 May 1993) was an Irish basketball player. He competed in the men's tournament at the 1948 Summer Olympics.
