= Christy Walsh (basketball) =

Irish basketball player (1920–1985)

Personal information
- Nationality: Irish
- Born: 1920 Tralee, Ireland
- Died: 12 January 1985 (aged 64–65) Dublin, Ireland

Sport
- Sport: Basketball

Achievements and titles
- Olympic finals: 1948 Summer Olympics

Christopher "Christy" Walsh (1920 – 1 December 1985) was an Irish basketball player. He competed in the men's tournament at the 1948 Summer Olympics.
