= Lew Beck (basketball) =

American basketball player (1922–1970)

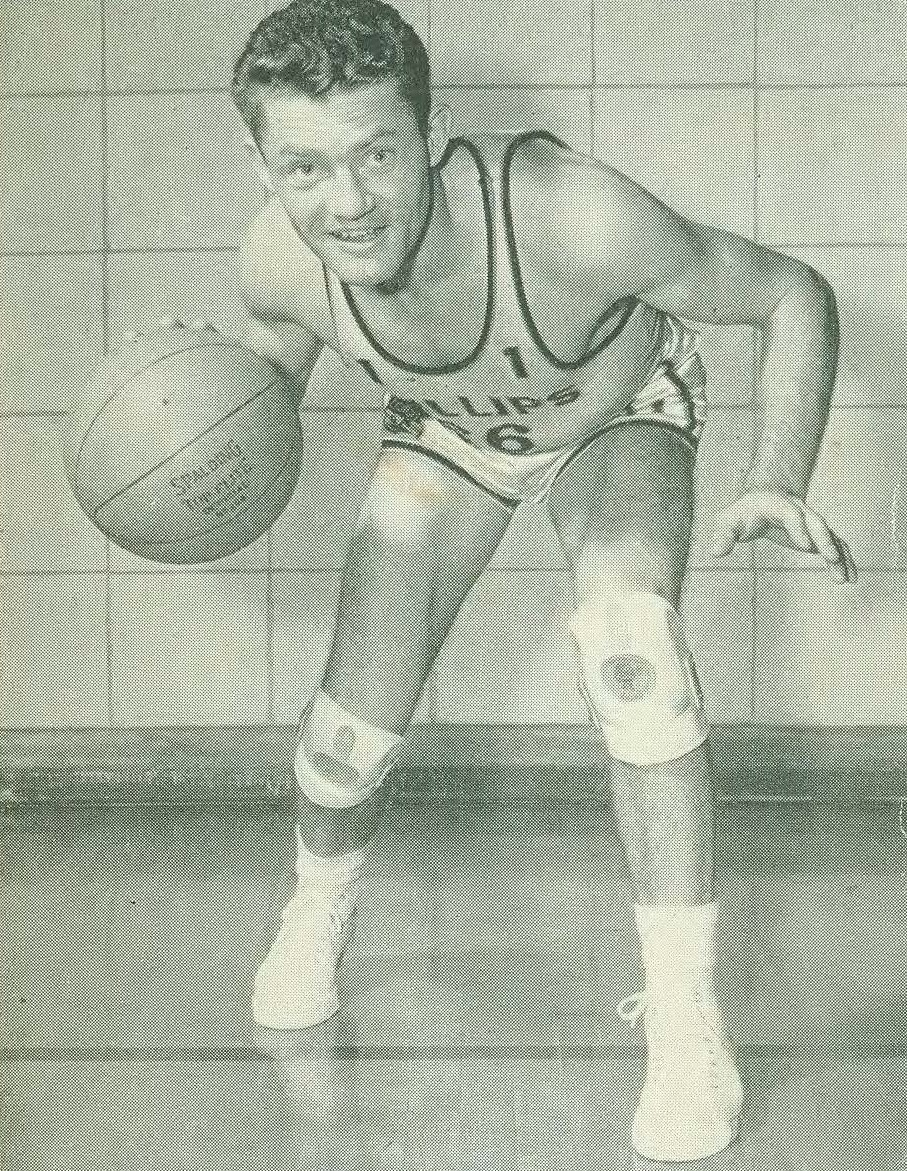
- Beck with the Phillips 66ers

Personal information
- Born: April 19, 1922 Portland, Oregon, U.S.
- Died: April 3, 1970 (aged 47) Great Falls, Montana, U.S.
- Listed height: 6 ft 0 in (1.83 m)
- Listed weight: 165 lb (75 kg)

Career information
- High school: Pendleton (Pendleton, Oregon)
- College: Oregon State (1941–1943, 1946–1947)
- Position: Guard

Career highlights
- Third team All-American – Helms (1947); First-team All-PCC (1947)
Medals
Men's basketball
Representing the United States
Olympic Games
Gold medal – first place	1948 London	Team competition

Lewis William Beck Jr. (April 19, 1922 – April 3, 1970) was an All-American college basketball player who was captain of the United States Olympic basketball team that won the Gold medal at the 1948 Summer Olympics. Before he began playing for Oregon State University, he suffered a leg injury in World War II.

Lew died of cancer in April 1970, his funeral was on April 7, 1970, in Portland, Oregon. The Oregon State University basketball team honored him by including among its annual awards the Lew Beck Memorial Award, the award given to the player who is deemed to be the team's most outstanding newcomer. In 1981, Lew was inducted into the Oregon Sports Hall of Fame.
