= Carlos Alegre =

Peruvian basketball player (born 1924)

Personal information
- Born: 7 May 1924 Uchumayo, Peru

Sport
- Sport: Basketball

Carlos Enrique Estanislao Alegre Benavides (born 7 May 1924, date of death unknown) was a Peruvian basketball player. He competed in the men's tournament at the 1948 Summer Olympics.
