= Frank O'Connor (basketball) =

Irish basketball player

Personal information
- Nationality: Irish
- Born: 1922; Cahersiveen, Ireland
- Died: 29 December 1997 (aged 74–75); Tullamore, Ireland

Sport
- Sport: Basketball

Francis O'Connor (1922 – 29 December 1997) was an Irish basketball player. He competed in the men's tournament at the 1948 Summer Olympics.
