= Guillermo Ahrens =

Peruvian basketball player (1923–2017)

Personal information
- Nationality: Peruvian
- Born: 25 April 1923 Callao, Peru
- Died: 25 July 2017 (aged 94) Lima, Peru

Sport
- Sport: Basketball

Guillermo Gustavo Ahrens Valdivia (25 April 1923 – 25 July 2017) was a Peruvian basketball player. He competed in the men's tournament at the 1948 Summer Olympics. Ahrens died in Lima on 25 July 2017, at the age of 94.
