= David Descalzo =

Peruvian basketball player

Personal information
- Nationality: Peruvian
- Born: 2 January 1920
- Died: 27 July 2004 (aged 84)

Sport
- Sport: Basketball

David Descalzo Álvarez (2 January 1920 – 27 July 2004) was a Peruvian basketball player. He competed in the men's tournament at the 1948 Summer Olympics.
