= Danny Reddin =

Irish basketball player (1914–1976)

Personal information
- Nationality: Irish
- Born: 12 August 1914 Dún Laoghaire, Ireland
- Died: 2 January 1976 (aged 61) Athlone, Ireland

Sport
- Sport: Basketball

Daniel Reddin (12 August 1914 – 2 January 1976) was an Irish basketball player. He competed in the men's tournament at the 1948 Summer Olympics.
