= Virgilio Drago =

Peruvian basketball player (1925–1997)

Personal information
- Born: 4 February 1925 Lima, Peru
- Died: 1997 (aged 71–72) Peru

Sport
- Sport: Basketball

Virgilio Andrés Drago Burga (4 February 1925 – 1997) was a Peruvian basketball player. He competed in the men's tournament at the 1948 Summer Olympics.
