= History of the FIBA Basketball World Cup =

- Current season, competition or edition: 2023 FIBA Basketball World Cup
- Sport: Basketball
- Founded: 1950
- No. of teams: 32
- Continent: International (FIBA)
- Most recent champion: Germany (1st title)
- Most titles: United States; Yugoslavia (5 titles)

The history of the FIBA Basketball World Cup began in 1950, with the first FIBA Basketball World Cup, which was the 1950 FIBA World Championship. The FIBA Basketball World Cup is an international basketball competition contested by the men's national teams of the members of the International Basketball Federation (FIBA), the sport's global governing body. The championship has been held every four years since the inaugural tournament in 1950 (the 1958 tournament was postponed to 1959 and did not get back on its current schedule until the 1970 tournament was held three years after the 1967 tournament).

The tournament was conceived during the 1948 Summer Olympics when FIBA leaders, seeing how successful the Olympic basketball tournament had become, wanted to hold a Championship every four years between Olympiads. The first tournament was held in 1950 in Argentina and was won by the hosts. The tournament was later dominated from 1963 through 1998 by Brazil, the Soviet Union (and later Russia), the United States, and Yugoslavia (and later Croatia and Serbia and Montenegro), as those four teams won every medal in that era. Since 2002, however, parity has seen new teams claim medals as basketball continues to grow throughout the world.

The tournament was restricted to European and South American professional players for the first forty years of its existence. In 1989, FIBA made the decision to allow NBA players for future tournaments. Starting in 1994, NBA players have played in each Basketball World Cup.

== Background ==
The first international basketball tournament took place in South America in 1930, some forty years after Dr. James Naismith invented the game.

The International Amateur Basketball Federation (better known by its French acronym FIBA) was founded two years later with founding members Argentina, Czechoslovakia, Greece, Italy, Latvia, Portugal, Romania, and Switzerland. In 1935, Europe held its first continental championship; based on the success of the event, basketball was introduced as an outdoor game for the 1936 Summer Olympics in Berlin.

The 1936 tournament was largely a success, drawing 21 teams from five continents (excluding Spain and Hungary, who withdrew just prior to the competition), the largest of any team competition. The United States, Canada, and Mexico took the three podium spots. The tournament was not without its faults, as FIBA attempted to impose two last-minute rules. The first, that no player could be taller than 6 ft 3 in (1.91 m) was rejected after the United States (the only team with players over that stature) objected because half of their team would have been ineligible. The second, that only seven players could suit up for each game, was passed. Players also complained about the basketball, which was lighter than most players were used to and tended to get tossed about in the wind. Finally, the final turned into a sloppy affair held in a driving rainstorm on a clay tennis court; the United States won over Canada 19–8 in what was the lowest scoring game of the tournament (future events were moved indoors because of the disastrous weather). Despite the storm and the lack of any seating, 1,000 fans showed up for the final, and basketball was kept on the Olympic program for future years.

Although the European Basketball Championship was put on hold between 1939 and 1946 because of World War II, the South American Basketball Championship was held every year between 1937 and 1945. Following the war years, basketball continued to grow in popularity; the 1947 European Basketball Championship drew a record fourteen teams. Basketball was again part of the Olympics in 1948. Despite the continued dominance of the gold medal-winning American team, the tournament was a resounding success, drawing 23 nations that were evenly disbursed around the world (eight from Europe, five from South America, five from Asia, four from North America, and one from Africa), though defending European champions Soviet Union did not take part in the event.

With the successful Olympic tournament taking place in the background, the FIBA Congress met in London in 1948. At the urging of FIBA Secretary-General Renato William Jones, FIBA decided to organize a World Championship tournament every four years between the Olympics. The first tournament was to be held in 1950. Argentina was nominated to host for three major reasons – first, European countries were still recovering from the War and none had expressed interest in hosting; second, Argentina had a positive image in the international basketball community and were a founding member of FIBA; finally, and probably most importantly, they were willing to take on the unenviable task of hosting the first World Championship. FIBA decided to invite ten teams – the hosts Argentina, the medalists from the 1948 Olympics (the United States, France, and Brazil), plus two teams each from South America, Europe, and Asia.

== History ==
=== South American dominance (1950-1963) ===
Like the inaugural FIFA World Cup twenty years before, the first World Championship in 1950 experienced severe growing pains. The most prominent concern was teams' unwillingness to participate: South American champion Uruguay refused to make the short trip to Buenos Aires after Argentinian immigration officials refused to grant visas to members of the Uruguayan press. South American runner-up Brazil had already qualified by finishing third at the 1948 Olympics, so the two South American berths fell to third and fourth placed teams Chile and Peru. As no Asian team wanted to make the long trip to Argentina, FIBA invited European champion Egypt and Ecuador. None of the stronger European teams wanted to make the journey either, so Europe was represented by Yugoslavia (which had finished 13th in their only European Championship appearance in 1947) and Spain (which had not participated in a European Championship since 1935). All three Olympic medalists participated, although the United States did not take the tournament particularly seriously and sent a team of factory workers from a Denver Chevrolet plant, rather than holding tryouts. France, meanwhile, returned only two players from their Olympic silver medalist team. Two more unfortunate incidents took place on the court: First, Yugoslavia refused to stand for the anthem of Franco's Spain in the ninth place game before walking off the court, forfeiting the game and receiving a nine-month ban from FIBA for their actions. Second, a refereeing error gave Egypt a preliminary round win over France; when Egypt refused to replay the game, France appealed, threatening the schedule of the tournament. Fortunately, the French withdrew their protest and the tournament proceeded as scheduled. The 1950 tournament also had bright spots, most coming from the home team. Argentina, which had finished 15th in the previous Olympics, kept the same team together in what amounted to a two-year training camp for the team, including six-hour practices every day for the three months directly preceding the tournament. It paid off, as the Argentinians beat the top-seeded Americans in the final, the first ever loss for the United States in international competition. An overflow crowd of 25,000 fans packed into Luna Park in Buenos Aires to watch the final between Argentina and the United States.

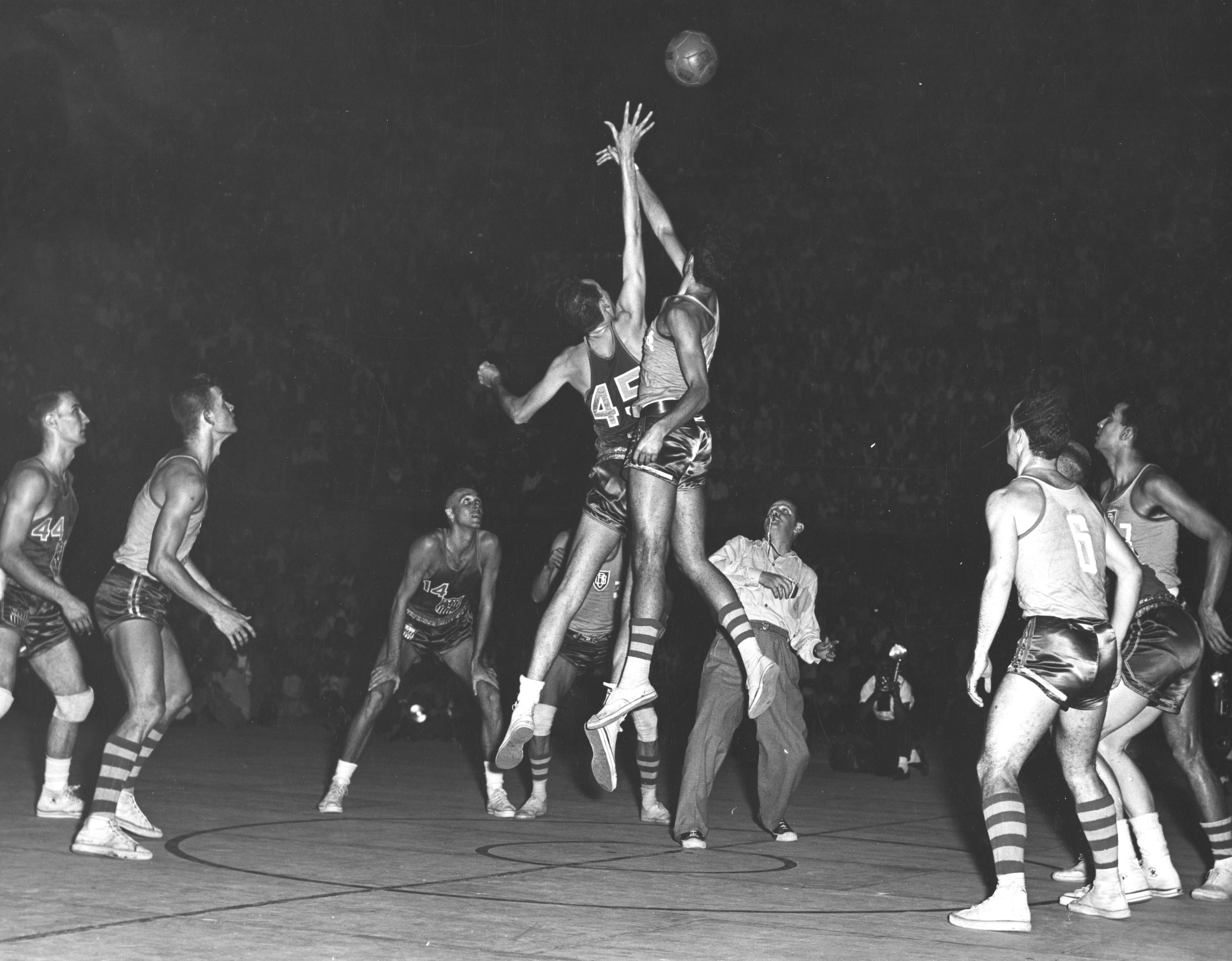
The USA Basketball Team Playing Brazil in the Title Game of the 1954 World Basketball Tournament in Rio.

The 1954 FIBA World Championship returned to South America, this time held in Brazil. Originally scheduled to be co-hosted by São Paulo and Rio de Janeiro, the tournament was moved entirely to Rio after São Paulo's Ibirapuera Gymnasium was not completed in time to host the event at the end of October. Rio's Maracanãzinho, which was ready on time, became the venue for the competition. Once again, the majority of teams (seven of twelve) were from the Americas, though defending champion Argentina did not participate for political reasons. Also due to Cold War issues, the Soviet Union was not invited to the tournament, despite being the reigning European champion. The Brazilian Basketball Confederation, co-organizer of the event, had initially excluded both the USSR and Hungary (the European runner-up) from the list of invited teams. Later, the Brazilian government, citing the lack of diplomatic relations between the two countries, confirmed it would not grant a visa to the Soviet team, effectively barring their participation. Brazil stood firm in its decision despite protests from Soviet officials and FIBA, which warned of potential repercussions. Without USSR, Hungary and Czechoslovakia (the fourth-place team at EuroBasket 1953), Europe was represented by France (third place), Israel (fifth place), and Yugoslavia (sixth place). Asia made its first appearance in the tournament, represented by the Formosa and the Philippines. The Philippines impressed, finishing with a bronze medal, still the highest finish for any Asian team in the tournament's history. The United States took the competition more seriously this time, sending the three-time AAU champions, the Peoria Caterpillars. The Americans cruised to an undefeated 9–0 record, winning each game by an average of more than 25 points, including a 21-point victory over the previously unbeaten Brazil in the final. Once again, attendance was impressive, with a still-standing record of 35,000 spectators watching the final at Maracanãzinho.

Although the 1959 tournament in Santiago, Chile, was again dominated by teams from the Americas, the Eastern Bloc made its first appearance, with EuroBasket 1957 champion Soviet Union and runner-up Bulgaria participating for the first time. The tournament was originally scheduled for 1958, but was moved to January 1959 after delays in the construction of the Metropolitan Indoor Stadium. Funds originally allocated for the arena were instead redirected to football stadiums throughout the country after Chile was awarded the 1962 FIFA World Cup. This led to the tournament being moved outdoors to the Estadio Nacional, which was converted from a football stadium to a basketball arena for the occasion. In a precedent that would continue until the 1982 FIBA World Championship, the host team was given a bye into the final round of the tournament. The tournament was briefly threatened when the United States initially declined the invitation due to the postponement of the event, which was now scheduled in the middle of the NCAA and AAU seasons. After FIBA warned the Americans that this would undermine the competition, the U.S. relented and sent a team from the United States Air Force. The Soviet Union impressed in its matchup with the second-rate American team, dominating in a 62–37 victory witnessed by 30,000 fans, a FIBA record for non-final games. Still, the European champion Soviets were beatable, as evidenced by a preliminary round defeat to Canada. Despite this loss, the Soviet Union seemed well on their way to gold; a victory over Formosa in the final round robin game (there were no playoffs at the tournament) would have secured the gold. However, Cold War politics intervened once again, as the Soviets refused to take the court against Formosa due to their support for the People's Republic of China (Bulgaria did the same, though they were no longer in medal contention). As a result, the Soviet Union and Bulgaria were relegated to the last two places in the final round. Brazil eventually took their first gold medal, avenging their 1954 loss with an 81–67 victory over the Americans in what proved to be the deciding game. The demotions of Bulgaria and the Soviet Union pleased the home crowd, as Chile was promoted to the bronze medal position.

Politics once again played a role in the 1963 FIBA World Championship. The event had been awarded to Manila, Philippines, marking the first tournament to be held outside South America. However, the Philippine government refused to grant visas to the socialist countries (the Soviet Union and Yugoslavia). The tournament was subsequently moved back to Brazil for the second time in three tournaments. With diplomatic relations between the Soviet Union and Brazil at the time, Rio de Janeiro hosted the final round, routinely attracting sellout crowds of over 25,000 spectators. The tournament belonged to the hosts, as Brazil did not lose a game en route to winning their second consecutive World Championship. Although the tournament was again dominated by teams from the Americas (eight out of thirteen teams), Europe claimed its first medals, with Yugoslavia and the Soviet Union taking silver and bronze, respectively. The United States team, although later deemed "inferior" by FIBA, was still composed of the same AAU, college, and armed forces players who had won the gold medal at the 1963 Pan American Games just weeks before. Despite this, the Americans finished with three losses, placing fourth, marking the first time they failed to win a medal at the tournament.

=== European Dominance (1967-1982) ===
The 1967 FIBA World Championship was held in South America for the fifth consecutive time, this time in Montevideo, Uruguay. The 1967 tournament ushered in a new era in the World Championship – it was the first all-European final and the first tournament that had a qualification process, albeit an informal one. The Soviet Union, Yugoslavia, Poland, and Italy qualified by finishing in the top four at EuroBasket 1965; Japan grabbed the Asian qualifier spot by winning the 1965 ABC Championship; and Argentina, Brazil, Peru, and Chile qualified by finishing in the top four at the 1966 South American Basketball Championship. They were joined by hosts Uruguay and North American teams USA, Mexico, and Puerto Rico, which had no formal qualification process. Israel was also invited, but declined the participation. Chile likewise elected not to participate and were replaced by fellow South American side Paraguay. For the first time, a European team won the tournament, as the Soviet Union finished the round robin final round in first place despite an early 59–58 loss to the United States. Yugoslavia, Brazil, and the United States each finished at 4–2, with Yugoslavia taking the silver and Brazil the bronze based on their head-to-head results. The United States once again sent a hodgepodge team, assembling for the first time only ten days before the tournament. The hosts Uruguay were embarrassed in multiple ways – they finished last in the final round after going only 1–5 in the tournament, and games were hosted in "The Cylinder", a massive steel and concrete structure that required blankets and electric heaters for the players when temperatures inside dropped to 35 °F (2 °C). Starting with this tournament, the Naismith Trophy was awarded to the tournament champion.

The 1970 FIBA World Championship became the first to be held outside South America when Yugoslavia was awarded the event. The host position proved valuable for the Yugoslav team, as they won the gold medal after finishing with the silver medal for two consecutive tournaments. The 1970 tournament was notable as the first time that the champions of Oceania and Africa were given automatic berths in the tournament. The Asian champion was given an automatic berth for the second time. The chasm between the established basketball nations in the Americas and Europe and the developing nations in Asia, Oceania, and Africa became apparent when South Korea, Australia, and Egypt (competing as the United Arab Republic) finished 11th, 12th, and 13th of thirteen teams, respectively. Cuba and Panama, the top two teams at the 1969 Centrobasket, also earned berths. Like Australia, Egypt, and Korea, both were knocked out in the group stage, although neither were as badly over-matched, finishing eighth and ninth, respectively. With the new teams, South America's total representatives dipped to two teams, with Brazil and Uruguay representing the continent. Brazil (silver) and the Soviet Union (bronze) medaled for the third straight tournament. The United States, again fielding a team of lesser-known NCAA players, finished a disappointing fifth place, their worst finish so far at a World Championship.

The 1974 tournament moved back to the Western Hemisphere when it was held in basketball-crazy Puerto Rico. The tournament expanded to 14 teams for the first time, with the defending champions being given an automatic berth in the tournament. Both Yugoslavia, the defending champions, and host Puerto Rico were automatically qualified for the final round. Qualification remained the same, with the top three EuroBasket finishers, the top two Centrobasket finishers, the top two South American Basketball Championship finishers, the top two North American teams, and the champions of Africa, Asia, and Oceania each earning berths in the tournament. The developing nations again picked up the rear of the field. African champions Central African Republic particularly struggled, losing 140–48 to the Soviet Union in a preliminary round game that still ranks as the most lopsided defeat in FIBA World Championship history. The 140 points is even more spectacular, considering that FIBA had not yet installed a three-point line. Meanwhile, the United States sent a young and inexperienced, but very talented, team to the World Championship. Led by tournament MVP John Lucas II, the Americans went 8–1, their best result in years, but had to settle for the bronze based on a tiebreaker when the Soviet Union and Yugoslavia finished with identical records. The Soviet Union, boasting five veterans of the 1972 Olympic team that beat the United States for the first time, again defeated the Americans en route to winning the gold medal. Yugoslavia finished with the silver medal, their fourth consecutive podium at the tournament.

The 1978 FIBA World Championship was the first held in Asia, with the Philippines hosting the event fifteen years after they were originally scheduled to host the 1963 tournament. Fourteen teams participated in the tournament for the second time, while the qualification again remained the same. The tournament took a slightly different format for this edition; the top eight teams again qualified for a final round robin, but the top two teams after the round robin met in a playoff for the gold medal, while the third and fourth placed teams met for the bronze. The high-powered Yugoslav team scored more than 100 points in eight of their ten group stage games, cruising to an undefeated record. The Soviet Union went 9–1 to finish second and meet Yugoslavia in the gold medal game. The Soviet team held Yugoslavia to its lowest point total of the tournament, but fell 82–81 in a back-and-forth overtime thriller. After scoring a World Championship record 154 points in a preliminary round victory over China, Brazil beat Italy for the bronze medal, the fourth time in the last five years that those three teams had claimed the podium. After sending college players to the previous two World Championships, the United States sent an Athletes in Action squad because the early October schedule interfered with college team preparations. Somewhat predictably, the team struggled to a 6–4 record and a fifth-place finish. Oceania champions Australia improved, qualifying for the final round for the first time, becoming the first team from outside the Americas and Europe to qualify for the final round since the Philippines in 1954 (Philippines also qualified for the final round in this tournament, although they qualified automatically as hosts). Senegal won a game, beating Asian champion China in the consolation round to become the first African champion to win a game since they were given an automatic berth at the World Championship in 1970.

The 1982 FIBA World Championship was held in Colombia – a surprising choice given that the squad had never previously qualified for the World Championship. Given an automatic berth in the semifinals, the team predictably was overmatched by the traditional basketball powers and were outscored by 183 points in six games, including a 143–76 loss to the Soviet Union that ranked as the second most points ever given up in the World Championship. Despite Colombia's performance and lack of basketball history, attendance was solid, with a massive public outpouring of support. Qualification changed slightly for this tournament, as the tournament was pared down to thirteen teams for this edition. The United States, plus the winners of Centrobasket, Eurobasket, Oceania Championship, Asian Championship, African Championship, and South American Championship were afforded only one berth each, with the top three finishers at both the Summer Olympics and 1978 World Championship also gaining berths. Italy was scheduled to compete as the silver medalist at the 1980 Summer Olympics, but withdrew and were replaced by fourth-placed finisher Spain. Canada was later given a wildcard berth to the tournament. Once again, the final group stage ended with a gold medal and bronze medal match. After the Athletes in Action debacle of 1978, the United States sent a talented college team led by tournament MVP Doc Rivers. The US team went 5–1 in the final round to qualify for the gold medal match against the Soviet Union. However, the Soviets avenged a group stage loss to the Americans in a thrilling 95–94 victory, as the Americans' last minute jumper fell short. Yugoslavia won its sixth consecutive medal by beating Spain 119–117 in the bronze medal game, while Australia captured fifth place for its best finish to date.

=== Tournament changes, the "Big Three" dominance (1986-1998) ===
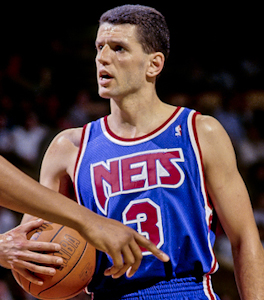
Dražen Petrović, the 1986 World Basketball Tournament MVP.

The 1986 FIBA World Championship brought major changes. The tournament expanded to 24 teams for the first time, divided into four preliminary round groups of six teams each. The three top teams in each group then qualified for two six team semifinal round groups before the top two teams in each of those groups met in a four-team single elimination playoff round. Additionally, the three-point line was added for the first time at this tournament. The defending champions Soviet Union and host Spain earned automatic berths; the remaining spots were given to six European teams, two North American teams, three South American teams, three Centrobasket teams, three Asian teams, two African teams, and one Oceanian team. Wild cards were also given out to France and New Zealand. The expansion proved to be questionable, as there were huge disparities between the top and bottom teams. Group D was particularly disastrous, as last place Malaysia, which replaced Asian champion Philippines after they withdrew, were outscored by 226 points, while fourth place New Zealand were outscored by 114 points. Even these numbers were deceptive, as New Zealand only beat Malaysia by two points; in other games, Canada beat the Malaysians by 90 and Yugoslavia beat them by 70. The twelve-team semifinal round proved more competitive. After boycotts in the last two Olympics, the United States saw the World Championship as more prestigious, and sent a college team filled with future NBA players David Robinson, Charles Smith, Kenny Smith, and Muggsy Bogues. The college stars brought home the first World Championship gold for the Americans since 1954, beating the Soviet Union 87–85 in another thrilling gold medal game to avenge their championship game loss four years previous. Yugoslavia beat Brazil to capture a second consecutive bronze after being beat by a point in a semifinal overtime game versus the Soviets. Host Spain again turned in a solid performance, finishing in fifth place four years after finishing in fourth.

After the preliminary round mismatches four years previous, the 1990 FIBA World Championship was trimmed to a sixteen team format that would remain in place until 2006. Like it did in 1950, Luna Park in Buenos Aires hosted the tournament final as FIBA returned to its roots in Argentina. The sixteen teams were divided into four groups of four teams each; the top two teams in each group advanced to the second group stage. The top two teams in each of the second group stage groups then advanced to the single-elimination knockout round. Qualification was again revised as Asia and Africa were given two berths each, and Oceania one. Five teams each qualified from the newly restructured Tournament of Americas (which now included teams from North, Central, and South America) and the Eurobasket tournament. Host Argentina also was given a spot in the tournament. This tournament would be the last to feature Yugoslavia and the Soviet Union, and both made the most of it, meeting in the gold medal match. Led by Croatian Dražen Petrović and Serbian Vlade Divac, the golden generation of Yugoslav basketball played together for the last time in a major international tournament at the World Championship. The team won the gold medal, beating the Soviet Union 92–75, a fitting end for a country that was soon to break into ethnic war and pit former teammates against each other. The Soviet Union won a silver medal in their last tournament, although they were already weakened on account of the Baltic countries declaring independence in early 1990. Most importantly, the Soviets were without star center Arvydas Sabonis after Lithuania declared independence in March 1990. The United States captured the bronze by beating Puerto Rico 107–105 after trailing by eight points with 1:28 left. Despite not winning a medal, the fourth-place finish was the best finish for the Puerto Ricans in the World Championship. Once again, Asian and African teams struggled, as Angola, Egypt, China, and South Korea all finished winless in group play.

The 1994 FIBA World Championship, held in Ontario, Canada after original host Belgrade was forced to withdraw on account of the Yugoslav Wars, was full of new sights. In 1989, FIBA made the decision to open up future competitions to NBA players (prior to that only European and South American professionals were allowed to participate), starting with the 1992 Summer Olympics, and at the same time dropped the word "Amateur" from its official name. Led by Shaquille O'Neal, Reggie Miller, and Joe Dumars, the United States fielded a team of NBA players, known as the "Dream Team II." Meanwhile, the Soviet Union had broken apart and was succeeded by Russia. The newly structured FR Yugoslavia was prevented from competing by a UN embargo, while former Yugoslav republic Croatia appeared under its own flag for the first time. However, neither Russia, Croatia, or any other team were any match for the United States NBA players, as the Americans cruised to the gold medal, winning every game by an average of 37.7 points per game. In the final, the United States beat Russia 137–91 in a game witnessed by an official World Championship record crowd of 32,616 that was by far the most lopsided final in World Championship history. Only Spain, in the first game of the tournament, was able to put up any sort of resistance against the Americans, losing by only 15. Russia and Croatia took the silver and bronze medals, respectively, in their first tournament. The tournament also saw the first appearance of the reunified Germany, which finished 12th. Asian champions China finished eighth after becoming the first Asian team to qualify for the second group stage in the tournament's new format.

The 1998 FIBA World Championship, held in Athens, lost some of its luster when the 1998–99 NBA lockout prevented the American NBA players from participating. Unlike the record crowds that turned out to see the Dream Team II in 1994, no more than a few thousand people watched the Americans' first game, an 83–59 victory over Brazil. The scrappy Americans, made up of college, semi-pro, and overseas players, did manage to exceed expectations and win the bronze medal over the host Greek team. New faces again turned up at the tournament, as former Soviet republic Lithuania made its debut. The most resounding debut, however, belonged to the new look Yugoslavia team, now consisting of the former Yugoslav republics of Serbia and Montenegro. Despite missing some its best players, Yugoslavia won the gold medal over Russia to pick up where they left off eight years ago.

=== Further Expansion, Yugoslavia sets a record, Rise of Spain (2002-2006) ===
Although no one would have guessed at the time, the 2002 FIBA World Championship, held in Indianapolis, ushered in a new era of parity in international basketball. Since 1963, some combination of Brazil, the Soviet Union (and Russia), Yugoslavia (and its post-breakup republics), and the United States had won every medal. With the United States again fielding a team of NBA players, and Russia and EuroBasket 2001 champion Yugoslavia still going strong, no one seriously expected other teams to challenge for medals. In retrospect, the writing was on the wall for the era of dominance for those teams. First, after the United States had dominated every tournament with NBA players since 1992, winning 53 straight international games, many of the top-flight NBA players had lost interest and decided not to participate. Second, Russia's golden generation had passed; the team failed to medal in the 1999 and 2001 EuroBasket tournaments – the first time since the Soviet Union started participating in 1947 that the team had failed to medal in two consecutive European championships. Finally, a new format debuted in 2002, making Cinderella runs more likely. Teams were still divided into four groups of four teams each, but the top three advanced to the next group stage. From there the teams were divided into two groups of six, with the top eight advancing to the eight-team single elimination knockout stage. This made it more likely that the powerhouse teams would not medal, as a loss in the quarterfinal knockout round would send the team to the consolation bracket.

This eventually proved to be the case for the United States. After the Americans opened up the tournament 5–0, Argentina stunned the United States in the final second group stage game, opening up a 20-point second quarter lead before hanging on for an 87–80 victory. The Americans could never come all the way back from the deficit, as Argentina ended the 58-game winning streak for the United States in tournaments that NBA players competed in. In the opposite group, Yugoslavia also struggled, finishing third; this set up a quarterfinal match between the two teams, meaning only one of the two favorites would medal. The US was shocked yet again, 81–78, in a game that the US led by as many as ten points. Although Yugoslavia went on to win gold, the US lost again in the consolation bracket to Spain to finish sixth in the tournament. Russia, meanwhile, did not even get out of the second group stage, finishing in tenth place with a 3–5 record. Argentina won the silver medal for its first medal since it won the 1950 tournament, while Germany beat New Zealand for the bronze, its first ever medal. New Zealand's fourth-placed finish was the best for an Oceania team, while African champion Angola and Asian champion China both continued to improve with both qualifying for the second group stage.

After the 2002 FIBA World Championship ushered in a new era of parity, FIBA made the decision to expand the 2006 tournament to 24 teams for the first time since the failed expansion in 1986. In announcing the expansion, FIBA cited the "increased level of basketball around the world and the increasing number of competitive teams at the highest level." FIBA also removed the second group stage; instead, the top four teams in each group of six would move on to a 16-team, single-elimination knockout stage. The host and Olympic champion received automatic berths, while six European teams, four Americas teams, three Asian teams, three African teams, and two Oceanian teams were given berths. Additionally, FIBA reserved four spots for wild-card invitations, which were later given to Serbia and Montenegro, Italy, Puerto Rico, and Turkey. Russia was notably absent for the first time since the Soviet Union began competing in 1959. A record 44 NBA players, signed to fifteen different teams, competed in the event.

The expansion experiment was immediately successful this time around, as African, Asian, and Oceanian teams had all improved. On day one of the tournament, African side Nigeria made their World Championship debut by defeating two-time defending champion Serbia and Montenegro in stunning fashion. Although all nine European teams qualified for the eighth finals, they were joined for the first time by two African teams in Angola and Nigeria. China was the only Asian team to advance to the eighth finals, although Lebanon went 2–3 and defeated France in group play before being eliminated on a tiebreaker. Both Australia and New Zealand qualified for the eighth finals as well. FIBA Americas teams suffered the most, as Brazil, Panama, and Venezuela were all sent home early with a combined two wins between them – a stunning development that showed just how far basketball had come in other parts of the world. In the end, Argentina, Greece, Spain, and the United States all finished group play undefeated; because of the new format, the three teams met each other in the semifinals after each won their first two knockout stage games. In the first semifinal, Spain narrowly beat Argentina 75–74 in an ugly defensive struggle to assure their first ever World Championship medal. In the second semifinal, Greece beat another team of NBA players, 101–95, as the US was unable to slow down the Greeks' offense. The final between first-time medalists Spain and Greece turned anticlimactic, as Greece's shooting went cold in a 70–47 victory for the Spanish. The United States recovered to win the bronze medal over Argentina.

=== The United States returns to the top (2010-2014) ===
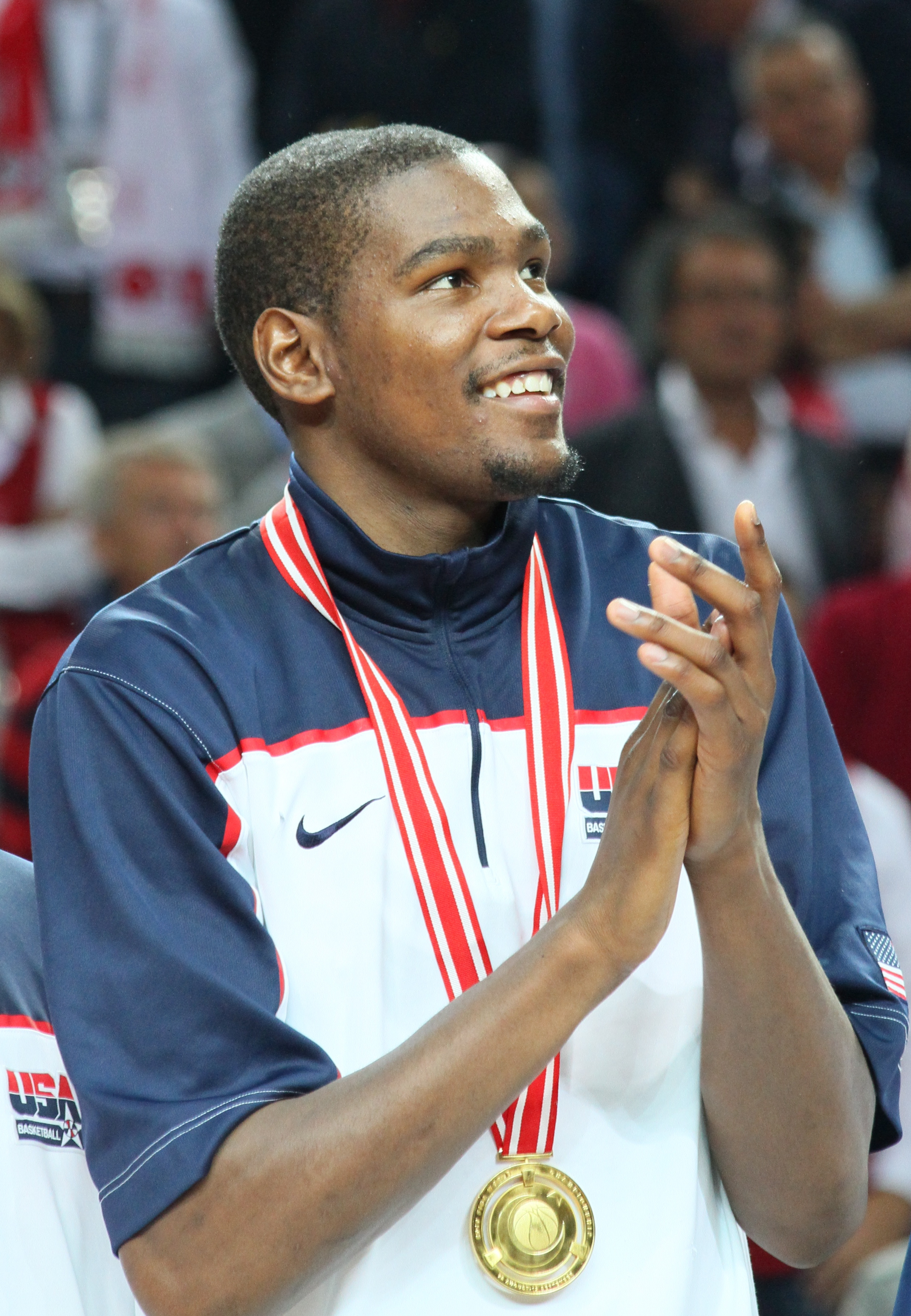
Kevin Durant, the 2010 World Basketball Tournament MVP.

After the success of the 2006 tournament, the 2010 FIBA World Championship in Turkey also featured 24 teams. 41 NBA players participated in the tournament. Once again, European teams were the most successful in the early rounds of the tournament; nine of ten European teams advanced to the knockout stage, as only Germany was sent home early after an overtime loss to Angola in group play. Six European teams advanced to the quarterfinals, tying their total from 2006. For the second straight tournament, the United States and Argentina were the only non-European teams to advance to the quarterfinals. Both Oceanian teams were knocked out in the eighth finals for the second straight tournament, as were the lone eighth finalists from Africa (Angola) and Asia (China). Defending World champion, European champion and Olympic silver medalist Spain struggled without star Pau Gasol, losing two of their first three games before Serbia knocked them out in the quarterfinals. Top-ranked Argentina was also knocked out in the quarterfinals. Eventually, the Argentines beat Spain for fifth place in a match that many thought would be for the title. The United States again brought a roster of NBA players, although none of the gold medal-winning 2008 Olympic team returned for the Americans. Instead, the Americans brought a young team, led by 21-year-old Kevin Durant and went undefeated in group play for the second consecutive tournament. Host Turkey and Lithuania, both looking for their first World Championship medal, also finished group play undefeated.

For the second straight tournament, all four group winners cruised into the semifinal round, with the USA facing Lithuania and hosts Turkey facing Serbia. The US cruised to a victory over Lithuania while Turkey used last-second heroics from Kerem Tunçeri, whose last-second layup sent Turkey to the final. Turkey became the first host team to reach the final since Yugoslavia in 1970. In the bronze medal game, Lithuania rebounded from their loss to the Americans, beating Serbia to win their first ever World Championship medal. Lithuania's victory, along with Turkey's appearance in the final, meant that first-time medalists have won two medals in each of the last three tournaments. The USA would go on to stop Turkey's Cinderella run in the final, becoming the first team to win four World Championships in the process.

The 2014 FIBA Basketball World Cup was awarded to Spain, the first time that Europe had hosted consecutive championships. Although currently the tournament is projected to have the same format, FIBA Secretary-General Patrick Baumann held out the prospect that the tournament will expand to 32 teams in a statement during the 2010 tournament. The 2014 newly named FIBA World Cup witnessed USA dominating the tournament and fielding a perfect 9–0 record en route to its record fifth gold medal, led by tournament MVP Kyrie Irving, defeating Serbia 129–92 to capture its second straight gold medal. France defeated Lithuania in the bronze medal game to receive its first ever medal.

In 2012, FIBA president Yvan Mainini announced major changes to the competition beyond 2014. The competition calendar will be changed significantly after the 2014 World Cup; in the future, the Basketball World Cup will be held in the year following the FIFA World Cup. To that end, there will be no Basketball World Cup in 2018; the next tournament will take place in 2019. Also, the expansion to 32 teams, which had been proposed for 2014, will instead occur in 2019.

=== New Era (2019-current) ===
The 2019 FIBA Basketball World Cup was awarded to China, the first time the country has hosted the tournament. The 2019 edition of the World Cup saw a record of 32 participating teams. In this tournament, then defending champions, the United States, failed to advance to the finals, losing to France in the quarter-finals. This was the first World Cup in history at which all three of the historically most successful teams (United States, Serbia/Yugoslavia and Russia/Soviet Union) failed to make it through to the semi-finals. It is also the worst result for the United States men's team at a World Cup; their previous worst result was sixth place in 2002. Spain captured their second title after beating Argentina in the final. France went on to win the bronze medal for the second consecutive time after defeating Australia.

The 2023 FIBA Basketball World Cup was the first tournament to be co-hosted by multiple nations: the Philippines, Japan, and Indonesia. It was the second straight World Cup to be held in the Asian continent and the first in tournament history where a host nation did not qualify. Then-defending champions Spain failed to make the quarter-finals for the first time since 1994, while Olympic champions United States failed to win a medal for the second consecutive tournament. Latvia, South Sudan, Georgia, and Cape Verde made their tournament debut, with Latvia finishing at 5th place. In their first finals appearance, Germany captured its first title after beating Serbia. Led by tournament MVP Dennis Schröder, the country became only the 7th nation to win the World Cup. Canada went on to win the bronze medal, its first medal in World Cup history, after defeating the United States.

The 2027 FIBA Basketball World Cup will be the first tournament to be held in the Arab world and the third straight to be held in Asia, with Qatar being awarded the hosting rights to host the event.

== Format of each final tournament ==
The FIBA Basketball World Cup has used several different formats between 1950 and 2010 as they have expanded and contracted between 10 and 24 teams throughout the years. Prior to 1978, the tournament most often used two group stages, with the final round being a round-robin. In every year since 1978, the tournament has used some variation of a group stage followed by a single-elimination tournament to determine the champion. The following table lists the format used for each tournament:

(*) Results from 1st phase between qualified teams are carried on to the 2nd phase.

(**) All results from 1st phase are carried on to the 2nd phase.

Year	Host	Teams	Preliminary round	Latter stages	Classification round
1950	Argentina	10	Double elim tournament	A group of 6	A group of 4
1954	Brazil	12	4 groups of 3	A group of 8	A group of 4
1959	Chile	13	3 groups of 4	A group of 7	2 groups of 3, then positional matches
1963	Brazil	13	3 groups of 4	A group of 7	A group of 6
1967	Uruguay	13	3 groups of 4	A group of 7	A group of 6
1970	Yugoslavia	13	3 groups of 4	A group of 7	A group of 6
1974	Puerto Rico	14	3 groups of 4	A group of 8 (*)	A group of 6 (*)
1978	Philippines	14	3 groups of 4	A group of 8 (*); then positional matches for gold, bronze, 5th and 7th	A group of 6 (*)
1982	Colombia	13	3 groups of 4	A group of 7 (*), then positional matches for gold and bronze	A group of 6 (*)
1986	Spain	24	4 groups of 6	2 groups of 6 (*), knockout of 4 teams (group 1sts and 2nds)	Knockout for 5th between group 3rds and 4ths, for 9th between 5ths and 6ths, and 5th and 6ths teams in prelims tied for 13th
1990	Argentina	16	4 groups of 4	2 groups of 4, knockout of 4 teams (group 1sts and 2nds). 5th to 8th: knockout of 4 teams (group 3rds and 4ths).	2 groups of 4. 9th to 12th: knockout of 4 teams (group 1sts and 2nds). 13th to 16th: knockout of 4 teams (group 3rds and 4ths).
1994	Canada	16	4 groups of 4	2 groups of 4, knockout of 4 teams (group 1sts and 2nds). 5th to 8th: knockout of 4 teams (group 3rds and 4ths).	2 groups of 4. 9th to 12th: knockout of 4 teams (group 1sts and 2nds). 13th to 16th: knockout of 4 teams (group 3rds and 4ths).
1998	Greece	16	4 groups of 4	2 groups of 6 (**), knockout of 8 teams (group 1sts to 4ths)	Knockout for 9th between 5ths and 6ths of the 2nd phase, knockout for 13th between prelim group 4ths
2002	United States	16	4 groups of 4	2 groups of 6 (**), knockout of 8 teams (group 1sts to 4ths)	Knockout for 9th between 5ths and 6ths of the 2nd phase, knockout for 13th between prelim group 4ths
2006	Japan	24	4 groups of 6	Knockout of 16 teams	Knockout for 5th place. Losers of Round of 16 tied for 9th. Prelim round 5ths tied for 17th, 6ths tied for 21st
2010	Turkey	24	4 groups of 6	Knockout of 16 teams	Knockout for 5th place. Losers of Round of 16 listed 9th to 16th according to final record. Prelim round 5ths tied for 17th, 6ths tied for 21st
2014	Spain	24	4 groups of 6	Knockout of 16 teams	Prelim round 5ths tied for 17th, 6ths tied for 21st
2019	China	32	8 groups of 4	4 groups of 4 (**), knockout of 8 teams. 5th to 8th: Knockout for 5th place. Group 3rds listed 9th to 12th and group 4ths listed 13th to 16th according to final record.	4 groups of 4 (**). Group 1sts listed 17th to 20th, group 2nds listed 21st to 24th, group 3rds listed 25th to 28th and group 4ths listed 29th to 32nd according to final record.
2023	Philippines; Japan; Indonesia	32	8 groups of 4	4 groups of 4 (**), knockout of 8 teams. 5th to 8th: Knockout for 5th place. Group 3rds listed 9th to 12th and group 4ths listed 13th to 16th according to final record.	4 groups of 4 (**). Group 1sts listed 17th to 20th, group 2nds listed 21st to 24th, group 3rds listed 25th to 28th and group 4ths listed 29th to 32nd according to final record.
2027	Qatar	32	8 groups of 4	Knockout of 8 teams	TBD

== See also ==
- FIBA Basketball World Cup
- National team appearances in the FIBA Basketball World Cup
- FIBA Basketball World Cup records
- FIBA World Championship for Women
