= 1954 Philippines FIBA World Championship team =

Philippines
- Head coach: Herminio Silva
- Preliminary round: Second place
- Final round: Third place
- Scoring leader: Carlos Loyzaga 16.4
- Biggest win: 90–56 Israel (October 30, 1954)
- Biggest defeat: 62–99 Brazil (October 24, 1954)

The Philippines men's national basketball team won the bronze medal at the 1954 FIBA World Championship held in Brazil. Since the 2014, the event is known as the FIBA Basketball World Cup. This is also the Philippines' first appearance in the tournament.

To date, the Philippines' performance in the tournament is the best finish by an Asian country in the FIBA Basketball World Cup. The 1950s is often regarded as a "golden era" in Philippine basketball, with the Philippine team's feat in the 1954 championship a factor which contributed to the contemporary popularity of basketball in the country. The 1954 squad is also an inductee of the Philippine Sports Hall of Fame of the Philippine Sports Commission.

== Roster ==
The Philippine squad for the 1954 FIBA World Championship consisted of 12 players. The roster was led by Lauro Mumar and Carlos Loyzaga, the latter being named to the 1954 World Championship's All-Tournament Team.

The team had six players who had previously competed in the Summer Olympics: Loyzaga, Florentino Bautista, Antonio Genato, Ponciano Saldaña, and Mariano Tolentino (1952 Helsinki) and team captain Mumar (1948 London). Some of the players had plied their trade in the Manila Industrial and Commercial Athletic Association (MICAA) or were part of collegiate teams playing in the National Collegiate Athletic Association (NCAA) and the University Athletic Association of the Philippines (UAAP).

The team had an average height of 6 ft 0 in (183 cm) and had the average age of 23, Mumar was the eldest at 29 years old while Francisco Rabat was the youngest at 18 years old.

The team was led by head coach Herminio Silva. The squad was formed from a 24-man pool of players. The initial candidates were determined by a special basketball committee. The final squad formed by Silva is mostly same as the Philippine team which participated in the 1954 Asian Games. Asian Games captain Rafael Hechanova begged off having been recently married at the time. Jose Maria Cacho, Eduardo Lim and Ignacio Ramos also forego from participating in the 1954 championship. Mumar was named skipper in Hechanova's stead, while Rafael Barredo and Ben Francisco were named to the roster. Francis Wilson and Alfredo Sagarbarria were named alternates.

Former basketball player and government official Ambrosio Padilla also headed the 1954 squad.

#	Name	Team
3	Lauro Mumar	Letran Knights
4	Francisco Rabat	Ateneo Blue Eagles
5	Napoleon Flores	UST Glowing Goldies
6	Mariano Tolentino	JRC Heavy Bombers
7	Benjamin Francisco	PAL Skymasters
8	Rafael Barretto	San Miguel–San Beda
9	Ponciano Saldaña	San Beda Red Lions
10	Florentino Bautista	Letran Knights
11	Ramon Manulat	UST Glowing Goldies
12	Bayani Amador	FEU Tamaraws
13	Antonio Genato	San Beda Red Lions
14	Carlos Loyzaga	San Beda Red Lions
Coach: (Philippines) Herminio Silva

== Preliminary round ==
The Philippines was drawn to Group A with Paraguay men's national basketball team and host Brazil in the preliminary round. The Philippines won over Paraguay despite trailing in the first half. Brazil defeated the Philippines but the host's win over Paraguay ensured that the Philippines progress to the final round.

Pos	Team	Pld	W	L	PF	PA	PD	Pts	Qualification
1	Brazil (H)	2	2	0	160	114	+46	4	Final round
2	Philippines	2	1	1	126	151	−25	3	Final round
3	Paraguay	2	0	2	104	125	−21	2	Classification round

Source: FIBA archive
Rules for classification: 1) points; 2) head-to-head points; 3) head-to-head goal average; 4) head-to-head number of points scored.
(H) Hosts

October 23
21:00

Philippines	64–52	Paraguay
Scoring by half: 26–27, 38–25
Pts: Loyzaga 15		Pts: Zapattini 22

Ginásio do Maracanãzinho, Rio de Janeiro

October 24
21:45

Brazil	99–62	Philippines
Scoring by half: 44–22, 55–40
Pts: Bonfietti 18		Pts: Mumar 22

Ginásio do Maracanãzinho, Rio de Janeiro

== Final round ==
All teams play one game against each other for a total of seven games. The teams with the best records are awarded medals.

Pos	Team	Pld	W	L	PF	PA	PD	Pts
1	United States (C)	7	7	0	482	300	+182	14
2	Brazil (H)	7	6	1	418	341	+77	13
3	Philippines	7	5	2	438	406	+32	12
4	France	7	3	4	371	392	−21	10
5	Formosa	7	2	5	345	405	−60	9 (Note: Head-to-head record: Formosa 1–1 (1.06 GAvg), Uruguay 1–1 (1.03 GAvg), Canada 1–1 (0.91 GAvg))
6	Uruguay	7	2	5	422	446	−24	9
7	Canada	7	2	5	433	498	−65	9
8	Israel	7	1	6	330	451	−121	8

Source: FIBA archive
Rules for classification: 1) points; 2) head-to-head points; 3) head-to-head goal average; 4) head-to-head number of points scored.
(C) Champions; (H) Hosts
Notes:

The Philippines were tasked to face tournament favorites United States and expectedly lost to them. This was followed by wins over Israel, Formosa, Canada and a second lost to host Brazil.

The Philippines were assured of a bronze medal after their 66–60 win over France. This is due to Uruguay, their final opponent, having an inferior win–loss record. Nevertheless, the Philippines capped their campaign with a victory over Uruguay to formalize their third place finish.

October 27
18:00

Philippines	43–56	United States
Scoring by half: 22–25, 21–31
Pts: Mumar 14		Pts: Minter 15

Ginásio do Maracanãzinho, Rio de Janeiro
Referees: Eduardo Airaldi (PER), Helio Louzada (BRA)

October 29
19:00

Formosa	38–48	Philippines
Scoring by half: 21–21, 17–27
Pts: Wang Y.J. 12		Pts: Flores 12

Ginásio do Maracanãzinho, Rio de Janeiro
Referees: Renato Righetto (BRA), Juan M. Rossini (URU)

October 30

Israel	56–90	Philippines
Scoring by half: 30–37, 26–53
Pts: Schneor 14		Pts: Loyzaga, Saldaña 20

Ginásio do Maracanãzinho, Rio de Janeiro
Referees: Earl Schlup (USA), Aladino Astuto (BRA)

October 31

Brazil	57–41	Philippines
Scoring by half: 35–23, 22–18
Pts: de Almeida 15		Pts: Loyzaga 15

Ginásio do Maracanãzinho, Rio de Janeiro
Referees: Alberto Pedro (PAR), Juan M. Rossini (URU)

November 1
19:30

Canada	76–83	Philippines
Scoring by half: 35–41, 41–42
Pts: Ridd 37		Pts: Mumar 24

Ginásio do Maracanãzinho, Rio de Janeiro
Referees: Earl Schlup (USA), Orlando Tabuso (BRA)

November 3

Philippines	66–60	France
Scoring by half: 25–23, 41–37
Pts: Loyzaga 19		Pts: Haudegand 11

Ginásio do Maracanãzinho, Rio de Janeiro
Referees: Eduardo Airaldi (PER), Noli Coutinho (BRA)

November 5

Philippines	67–63	Uruguay
Scoring by half: 32–32, 35–31
Pts: Loyzaga 31		Pts: Lombardo 14

Ginásio do Maracanãzinho, Rio de Janeiro
Referees: Aladino Astuto (BRA), Angelo Benvenuto (CHI)
