= National team appearances in the FIBA Basketball World Cup =

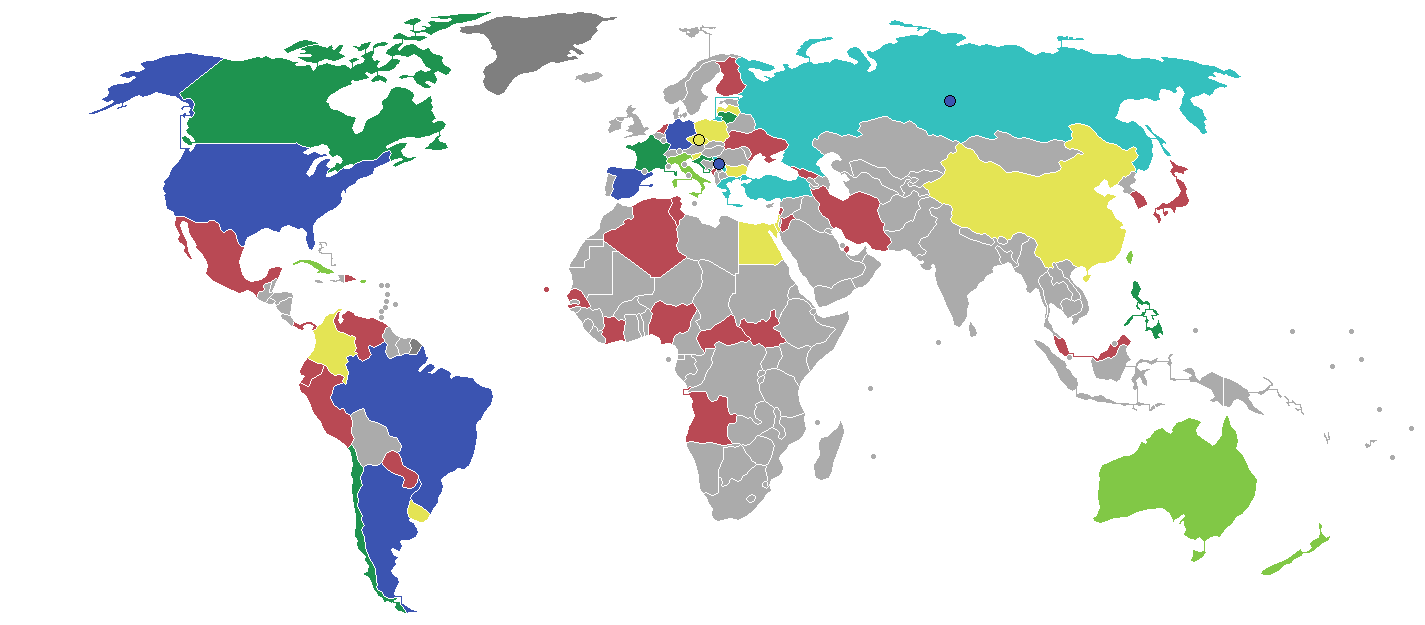
Map of countries' best results

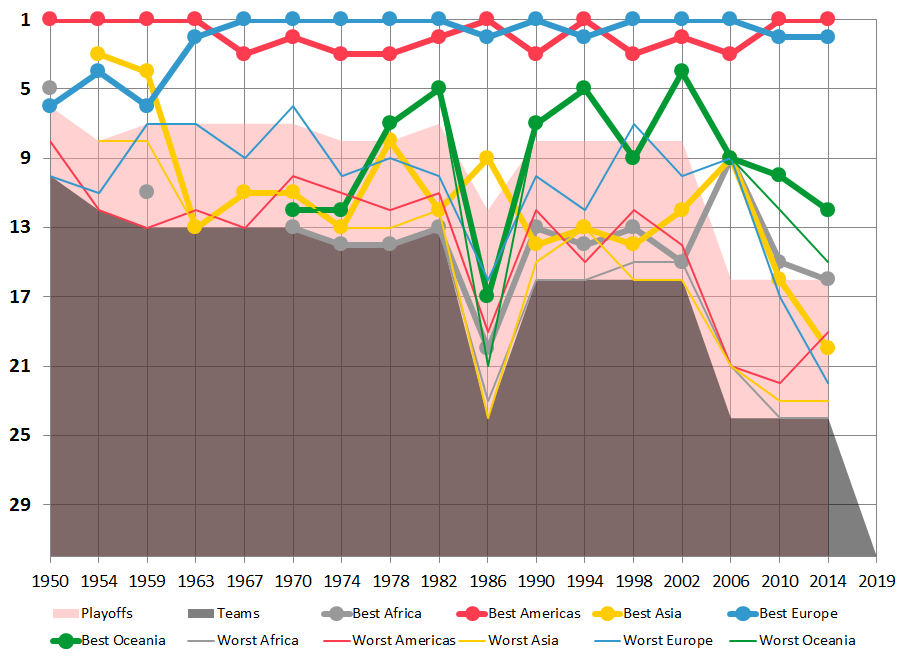
Graph of the best performances of each confederation on each tournament.

National team appearances in the FIBA Basketball World Cup are the number of appearances that individual country's basketball national teams have made at the FIBA Basketball World Cup. A total of 65 countries have made at least one appearance in the FIBA international senior men's basketball competition.

African, European and teams from the Americas composed the first World Championship – Asian and Oceanian teams did not want to make a long trip to Argentina, the venue of the tournament. Egypt finished fifth in the inaugural world championship, the best finish by a team from Africa. An Asian team, the Philippines, made their debut on the second tournament, where they finished third, the best finish by an Asian team.

Australia was the first team from Oceania to participate in the tournament, in 1970. New Zealand was defeated in the 2002 bronze medal game, earning them a fourth-place finish, a position the Australian team equaled in 2019.

European and teams from the Americas dominated the tournament, with teams from either confederation disputing the gold medal. Since 1978, the first time a final was played, there have been five all-European and six Europe-Americas finals. The worst finish by a European team since 1963 was second; for a team from the Americas, the worst all-time was third.

The tournament formats prior to the 1978 tournament were two round robin phases – teams were first divided into several groups, with the top teams from the group stage qualifying for the Final Group, where they play each other once. The team with the best record after the Final Group wins the gold medal, with ties broken by games played between tied teams. All tournaments after the 1978 tournament determined the world champion via a playoff – in 1978 and 1982, the top two teams from the final group squared off for the championship; since 1986, a single-elimination tournament has been used.

The national team with the most wins is the USA, with five. Although teams bearing the name of "Yugoslavia" have won five titles, FIBA used to consider the championships to have been won by two national teams. The first three were won by the team that represented the Socialist Federal Republic of Yugoslavia. The other two were won by a team representing the Federal Republic of Yugoslavia, which FIBA treats as the predecessor of the current Serbia national team. Furthermore, a Yugoslav team was able to finish at least third from 1963 to 2002.

Germany is the current World Champion, winning the gold medal game against Serbia at the 2023 FIBA Basketball World Cup.

== Debut of teams ==
A total of 65 national teams have appeared in at least one FIBA Basketball World Cup in the history of the tournament through the 2023 competition. Each successive Basketball World Cup has had at least one team appearing for the first time. Countries competing in their first Basketball World Cup are listed below by year.

| Year | Debutants | Number |
|---|---|---|
| 1950 | Argentina, Brazil, Chile, Ecuador, Egypt, France, Peru, Spain, United States, Yugoslavia | 10 |
| 1954 | Canada, Taiwan, Israel, Paraguay, Philippines, Uruguay | 6 |
| 1959 | Bulgaria, Mexico, Puerto Rico, Soviet Union, United Arab Republic | 5 |
| 1963 | Italy, Japan | 2 |
| 1967 | Poland | 1 |
| 1970 | Australia, Cuba, Czechoslovakia, Panama, South Korea | 5 |
| 1974 | Central African Republic | 1 |
| 1978 | China, Dominican Republic, Senegal | 3 |
| 1982 | Colombia, Ivory Coast | 2 |
| 1986 | Angola, Greece, Malaysia, Netherlands, New Zealand, West Germany | 6 |
| 1990 | Venezuela | 1 |
| 1994 | Croatia, Germany, Russia | 3 |
| 1998 | Lithuania, Nigeria, Serbia and Montenegro | 3 |
| 2002 | Algeria, Lebanon, Turkey | 3 |
| 2006 | Qatar, Slovenia | 2 |
| 2010 | Iran, Jordan, Serbia, Tunisia | 4 |
| 2014 | Finland, Ukraine | 2 |
| 2019 | Czech Republic, Montenegro | 2 |
| 2023 | Cape Verde, Georgia, Latvia, South Sudan | 4 |
| 2027 | | TBD |
| 2031 | | TBD |
| Total | | 65 |

== Tournament format ==
In deciphering the tables below, the tournament format per championship has to be accounted for.

| Year | Preliminary round (group stage) | Second round (group stage) | Final round (knockout stage) |
|---|---|---|---|
| 1950 | Double elimination tournament of 10 teams | Round robin of 6 teams | None; second group stage determined final rankings |
| 1954 | Round robin of 4 groups with 3 teams each | Round robin of 8 teams | None; second group stage determined final rankings |
| 1959 | Round robin of 3 groups with 4 teams each | Round robin of 7 teams | None; second group stage determined final rankings |
| 1963 | Round robin of 3 groups with 4 teams each | Round robin of 7 teams | None; second group stage determined final rankings |
| 1967 | Round robin of 3 groups with 4 teams each | Round robin of 7 teams | None; second group stage determined final rankings |
| 1970 | Round robin of 3 groups with 4 teams each | Round robin of 7 teams | None; second group stage determined final rankings |
| 1974 | Round robin of 3 groups with 4 teams each | Round robin of 8 teams | None; second group stage determined final rankings |
| 1978 | Round robin of 3 groups with 4 teams each | Round robin of 8 teams | Single-game playoff of 2 teams |
| 1982 | Round robin of 3 groups with 4 teams each | Round robin of 7 teams | Single-game playoff of 2 teams |
| 1986 | Round robin of 4 groups with 6 teams each | Round robin of 2 groups with 6 teams each | Single-elimination tournament of 4 teams |
| 1990 | Round robin of 4 groups with 4 teams each | Round robin of 2 groups with 4 teams each | Single-elimination tournament of 4 teams |
| 1994 | Round robin of 4 groups with 4 teams each | Round robin of 2 groups with 4 teams each | Single-elimination tournament of 4 teams |
| 1998 | Round robin of 4 groups with 4 teams each | Round robin of 2 groups with 6 teams each | Single-elimination tournament of 8 teams |
| 2002 | Round robin of 4 groups with 4 teams each | Round robin of 2 groups with 6 teams each | Single-elimination tournament of 8 teams |
| 2006 | Round robin of 4 groups with 6 teams each | None | Single-elimination tournament of 16 teams |
| 2010 | Round robin of 4 groups with 6 teams each | None | Single-elimination tournament of 16 teams |
| 2014 | Round robin of 4 groups with 6 teams each | None | Single-elimination tournament of 16 teams |
| 2019 | Round robin of 8 groups with 4 teams each | | |
| 2023 | Round robin of 8 groups with 4 teams each | | |
| 2027 | Round robin of 8 groups with 4 teams each | | |
| 2031 | Round robin of 8 groups with 4 teams each | | |

== Team results ==
Legend:

- 1st – Champions
- 2nd – Runner-up
- 3rd – Third place
- 4th – Fourth place
- QF — Knockout quarterfinals (1998–present)
- R2 — Second round group (1950–1994, 2019–present)
- WD — Withdrew
- • — Did not qualify
- × — Did not enter / disqualified
- — Hosts

| Team | 1950 (Argentina) | 1954 (Brazil) | 1959 (Chile) | 1963 (Brazil) | 1967 (Uruguay) | 1970 (Socialist Federal Republic of Yugoslavia) | 1974 (Puerto Rico) | 1978 (Philippines) | 1982 (Colombia) | 1986 (Spain) | 1990 (Argentina) | 1994 (Canada) | 1998 (Greece) | 2002 (United States) | 2006 (Japan) | 2010 (Turkey) | 2014 (Spain) | 2019 (China) | 2023 (Philippines) (Japan) (Indonesia) | 2027 (Qatar) | 2031 (France) | Total |
|---|---|---|---|---|---|---|---|---|---|---|---|---|---|---|---|---|---|---|---|---|---|---|
| Algeria | Part of France | | | | | | | | | | | | | R1; 15th | • | • | • | × | × | | | 1 |
| Angola | Part of Portugal | | | | | | | | | R1; 13th | R1; 13th | R1; 16th | | R2; 11th | R2; 9th | R2; 15th | R1; 17th | R1; 27th | R1; 26th | | | 9 |
| Argentina | R2; 1st | | R1; 10th | R1; 8th | R2; 6th | | R1; 11th | | | R2; 12th | R2; 8th | R1; 9th | QF; 8th | F 2nd | SF; 4th | QF; 5th | R2; 11th | F 2nd | • | | | 14 |
| Australia | | | | | | R1; 12th | R1; 12th | R2; 7th | R2; 5th | R1; 13th | R2; 7th | R2; 5th | R2; 9th | • | R2; 9th | R2; 10th | R2; 12th | SF; 4th | R2; 10th | | | 13 |
| Brazil | R2; 4th | R2; 2nd | R2; 1st | R2; 1st | R2; 3rd | R2; 2nd | R2; 6th | SF; 3rd | R1; 8th | SF; 4th | R2; 5th | R1; 11th | R2; 10th | QF; 8th | R1; 17th | R2; 9th | QF; 6th | R2; 13th | R2; 13th | | | 19 |
| Bulgaria | | | R2; 7th | | | | | | | | | | | • | • | • | • | • | • | | | 1 |
| Canada | | R2; 7th | R1; 12th | R1; 11th | | R1; 10th | R2; 8th | R2; 6th | R2; 6th | R2; 8th | R1; 12th | R2; 7th | R2; 12th | R1; 13th | • | R1; 22nd | • | R1; 21st | SF; 3rd | | | 15 |
| Cape Verde | | | | | | | | | | | | | | | | | | | R1; 28th | | | 1 |
| Central African Republic | | | | | | | R1; 14th | | | | | | | • | • | • | • | • | • | | | 1 |
| Chile | R2; 3rd | R1; 10th | R2; 3rd | | | | | | | | | | | • | • | • | • | • | • | | | 3 |
| China | | | | | | | | R1; 11th | R1; 12th | R2; 9th | R1; 14th | R2; 8th | | R2; 12th | R2; 9th | R2; 16th | • | R1; 24th | R1; 29th | | | 10 |
| Chinese Taipei; Formosa 1954, 1959 | | R2; 5th | R2; 4th | | | | | | | | | | | • | • | • | • | • | • | | | 2 |
| Colombia | | | | | | | | | R2; 7th | | | | | • | × | • | • | • | • | | | 1 |
| Croatia | Part of Yugoslavia | | | | | | | | | | | SF; 3rd | | • | • | R2; 14th | R2; 10th | • | • | | | 3 |
| Cuba | | | | | | R1; 8th | R2; 4th | | | R2; 11th | | R1; 15th | | • | • | • | • | • | • | | | 4 |
| Czech Republic | Part of Czechoslovakia | | | | | | | | | | | | | • | • | • | • | QF; 6th | • | | | 1 |
| Czechoslovakia | | | | | | R2; 6th | R1; 10th | R1; 9th | R1; 10th | | | Does not exist | | | | | | | | | | 4 |
| Dominican Republic | | | | | | | | R1; 12th | | | | | | • | • | • | R2; 13th | R2; 16th | R2; 14th | | | 4 |
| Ecuador | R1; 8th | | | | | | | | | | | | | • | • | × | × | × | • | | | 1 |
| Egypt; United Arab Republic 1959, 1970 | R2; 5th | | R1; 11th | | | R1; 13th | | | | | R1; 16th | R1; 14th | | • | × | • | R1; 24th | • | R1; 20th | | | 7 |
| Team | 1950 (Argentina) | 1954 (Brazil) | 1959 (Chile) | 1963 (Brazil) | 1967 (Uruguay) | 1970 (Socialist Federal Republic of Yugoslavia) | 1974 (Puerto Rico) | 1978 (Philippines) | 1982 (Colombia) | 1986 (Spain) | 1990 (Argentina) | 1994 (Canada) | 1998 (Greece) | 2002 (United States) | 2006 (Japan) | 2010 (Turkey) | 2014 (Spain) | 2019 (China) | 2023 (Philippines) (Japan) (Indonesia) | 2027 (Qatar) | 2031 (France) | Total |
| Finland | | | | | | | | | | | | | | • | × | • | R1; 22nd | • | R1; 21st | | | 2 |
| France | R2; 6th | R2; 4th | | R2; 5th | | | | | | R1; 13th | | | | • | QF; 5th | R2; 13th | SF; 3rd | SF; 3rd | R1; 18th | | Q | 10 |
| Georgia | Part of the Soviet Union | | | | | | | | | | | • | • | • | • | • | • | • | R2; 16th | | | 1 |
| Germany; West Germany 1986 | | | | | | | | | | R1; 13th | | R1; 12th | | SF; 3rd | QF; 8th | R1; 17th | • | R1; 18th | F 1st | | | 7 |
| Greece | | | | | | | | | | R2; 10th | R2; 6th | SF; 4th | SF; 4th | • | F 2nd | R2; 11th | R2; 9th | R2; 11th | R2; 15th | | | 9 |
| Indonesia | | | | | | | | | | | | | | | | | | | • | | | 0 |
| Iran | | | | | | | | | | | | | | • | • | R1; 19th | R1; 20th | R1; 23rd | R1; 31st | | | 4 |
| Israel | | R2; 8th | | | | | | | | R2; 7th | | | | • | • | • | • | • | • | | | 2 |
| Italy | WD | | | R2; 7th | R1; 9th | R2; 4th | | SF; 4th | | R2; 6th | R1; 9th | | QF; 6th | • | R2; 9th | • | • | R2; 10th | QF; 8th | | | 10 |
| Ivory Coast | | | | | | | | | R1; 13th | R1; 13th | | | | • | • | R1; 21st | • | R1; 29th | R1; 27th | | | 5 |
| Japan | | | | R1; 13th | R1; 11th | | | | | | | | R1; 14th | • | R1; 17th | • | • | R1; 31st | R1; 19th | | | 6 |
| Jordan | | | | | | | | | | | | | | • | • | R1; 23rd | • | R1; 28th | R1; 32nd | | | 3 |
| Latvia | Part of the Soviet Union | | | | | | | | | | | • | • | • | • | • | • | • | QF; 5th | | | 1 |
| Lebanon | | | | | | | | | | | | | | R1; 16th | R1; 17th | R1; 20th | • | • | R1; 23rd | | | 4 |
| Lithuania | Part of the Soviet Union | | | | | | | | | | | | QF; 7th | • | QF; 7th | SF; 3rd | SF; 4th | R2; 9th | QF; 6th | | | 6 |
| Malaysia | | | | | | | | | | R1; 13th | | | | • | • | • | • | × | × | | | 1 |
| Mexico | | | R1; 13th | R1; 9th | R1; 8th | | R1; 9th | | | | | | | • | • | • | R2; 14th | • | R1; 25th | | | 6 |
| Montenegro | Part of Yugoslavia | | | | | | | | | | | | | | Part of Serbia | × | • | R1; 25th | R2; 11th | | | 2 |
| Netherlands | | | | | | | | | | R1; 13th | | | | • | • | × | • | • | • | | | 1 |
| New Zealand | | | | | | | | | | R1; 13th | | | | SF; 4th | R2; 9th | R2; 12th | R2; 15th | R1; 19th | R1; 22nd | | | 7 |
| Nigeria | | | | | | | | | | | | | R1; 13th | • | R2; 9th | • | • | R1; 17th | • | | | 3 |
| North Korea | | | | | | | | | | | | WD | | • | × | × | × | × | × | | | 0 |
| Team | 1950 (Argentina) | 1954 (Brazil) | 1959 (Chile) | 1963 (Brazil) | 1967 (Uruguay) | 1970 (Socialist Federal Republic of Yugoslavia) | 1974 (Puerto Rico) | 1978 (Philippines) | 1982 (Colombia) | 1986 (Spain) | 1990 (Argentina) | 1994 (Canada) | 1998 (Greece) | 2002 (United States) | 2006 (Japan) | 2010 (Turkey) | 2014 (Spain) | 2019 (China) | 2023 (Philippines) (Japan) (Indonesia) | 2027 (Qatar) | 2031 (France) | Total |
| Panama | | | | | | R1; 9th | | | R1; 9th | R1; 13th | | | | • | R1; 21st | • | × | • | • | | | 4 |
| Paraguay | | R1; 9th | | | R1; 13th | | | | | | | | | • | • | × | • | • | • | | | 2 |
| Peru | R1; 7th | R1; 12th | | R1; 12th | R1; 10th | | | | | | | | | • | • | × | × | × | × | | | 4 |
| Philippines | | R2; 3rd | R1; 8th | | WD | | R1; 13th | R2; 8th | | WD | | | | × | × | • | R1; 21st | R1; 32nd | R1; 24th | | | 7 |
| Poland | | | | | R2; 5th | | | | | | | | | • | • | • | • | QF; 8th | • | | | 2 |
| Puerto Rico | | | R2; 5th | R2; 6th | R1; 12th | | R2; 7th | R1; 10th | | R1; 13th | SF; 4th | R2; 6th | R2; 11th | QF; 7th | R1; 17th | R1; 18th | R1; 19th | R2; 15th | R2; 12th | | | 15 |
| Qatar | | | | | | | | | | | | | | • | R1; 21st | • | • | • | × | Q | | 2 |
| Russia | Part of the Soviet Union | | | | | | | | | | | F 2nd | F 2nd | R2; 10th | • | QF; 7th | • | R2; 12th | × | | | 5 |
| Senegal | | | | | | | | R1; 14th | | | | | R1; 15th | • | R1; 21st | • | R2; 16th | R1; 30th | • | | | 5 |
| Serbia; Serbia and Montenegro 2006 | Part of Yugoslavia | | | | | | | | | | | | | | R2; 9th | SF; 4th | F 2nd | QF; 5th | F 2nd | | | 5 |
| Slovenia | Part of Yugoslavia | | | | | | | | | | | | | • | R2; 9th | QF; 8th | QF; 7th | • | QF; 7th | | | 4 |
| South Korea | WD | | | | | R1; 11th | | R1; 13th | | R1; 13th | R1; 15th | R1; 13th | R1; 16th | • | • | • | R1; 23rd | R1; 26th | × | | | 8 |
| South Sudan | Part of Sudan | | | | | | | | | | | | | | | | × | × | R1; 17th | | | 1 |
| Soviet Union | | | R2; 6th | R2; 3rd | R2; 1st | R2; 3rd | R2; 1st | F 2nd | F 1st | F 2nd | F 2nd | Does not exist | | | | | | | | | | 9 |
| Spain | R1; 9th | | | | | | R2; 5th | | SF; 4th | R2; 5th | R1; 10th | R1; 10th | QF; 5th | QF; 5th | F 1st | QF; 6th | QF; 5th | F 1st | R2; 9th | | | 13 |
| Tunisia | | | | | | | | | | | | | | • | • | R1; 24th | • | R1; 20th | • | | | 2 |
| Turkey | | | | | | | | | | | | | | R2; 9th | QF; 6th | F 2nd | QF; 8th | R1; 22nd | • | Q | | 6 |
| Ukraine | Part of the Soviet Union | | | | | | | | | | | | | • | • | • | R1; 18th | • | • | | | 1 |
| United States | R2; 2nd | R2; 1st | R2; 2nd | R2; 4th | R2; 4th | R2; 5th | R2; 3rd | R2; 5th | F 2nd | F 1st | SF; 3rd | F 1st | SF; 3rd | QF; 6th | SF; 3rd | F 1st | F 1st | QF; 7th | SF; 4th | | | 19 |
| Uruguay | WD | R2; 6th | R1; 9th | R1; 10th | R2; 7th | R2; 7th | | | R1; 11th | R1; 13th | | | | • | • | • | • | • | • | | | 7 |
| Venezuela | | | | | | | | | | | R1; 11th | | | R1; 14th | R1; 21st | • | • | R2; 14th | R1; 30th | | | 5 |
| Yugoslavia; FR Yugoslavia 1998, 2002 | R1; 10th | R1; 11th | | R2; 2nd | R2; 2nd | R2; 1st | R2; 2nd | F 1st | SF; 3rd | SF; 3rd | F 1st | | F 1st | F 1st | Does not exist | | | | | | | 12 |
| Total | 10 | 12 | 13 | 13 | 13 | 13 | 14 | 14 | 13 | 24 | 16 | 16 | 16 | 16 | 24 | 24 | 24 | 32 | 32 | 32 | 32 | |

Notes:

- Teams that failed to qualify to the semifinal round at the 1986 championship were ranked tied for 13th.
- In 2006, when the tournament expanded to 24 teams (four preliminary round groups of six teams each), teams that finished 5th in their preliminary round groups were ranked tied for 17th, while teams that finished 6th in their preliminary round groups were ranked tied for 21st. Teams eliminated in round of 16 were ranked tied for 9th.

== Ranking of teams by number of appearances ==
| Team | App | Record streak | Active streak | Debut | Most recent | Best result (* hosts) |
|---|---|---|---|---|---|---|
| United States | 19 | 19 | 19 | 1950 | 2023 | Champions (1954, 1986, 1994, 2010, 2014) |
| Brazil | 19 | 19 | 19 | 1950 | 2023 | Champions (1959, 1963*) |
| Canada | 15 | 9 | 2 | 1954 | 2023 | Third place (2023) |
| Puerto Rico | 15 | 10 | 10 | 1959 | 2023 | Fourth place (1990) |
| Argentina | 14 | 9 | 0 | 1950 | 2019 | Champions (1950*) |
| Australia | 13 | 8 | 5 | 1970 | 2023 | Fourth place (2019) |
| Spain | 13 | 11 | 11 | 1950 | 2023 | Champions (2006, 2019) |
| Yugoslavia † | 10 | 8 | -- | 1950 | 1990 | Champions (1970*, 1978, 1990) |
| China | 10 | 5 | 2 | 1978 | 2023 | 8th (1994) |
| Italy | 10 | 3 | 2 | 1963 | 2023 | Fourth place (1970, 1978) |
| France | 9 | 5 | 5 | 1950 | 2023 | Third place (2014, 2019) |
| Greece | 9 | 5 | 5 | 1986 | 2023 | Runners-up (2006) |
| Soviet Union † | 9 | 9 | -- | 1959 | 1990 | Champions (1967, 1974, 1982) |
| Angola | 9 | 6 | 6 | 1986 | 2023 | 9th (2006) |
| South Korea | 8 | 4 | 0 | 1970 | 2019 | 11th (1970) |
| Uruguay | 7 | 5 | 0 | 1954 | 1986 | 6th (1954) |
| Philippines | 7 | 3 | 3 | 1954 | 2023 | Third place (1954) |
| New Zealand | 7 | 6 | 6 | 1986 | 2023 | Fourth place (2002) |
| Germany | 7 | 3 | 2 | 1986 | 2023 | Champions (2023) |
| Egypt | 7 | 2 | 1 | 1950 | 2023 | 5th (1950) |
| Japan | 6 | 2 | 2 | 1963 | 2023 | 11th (1967) |
| Lithuania | 6 | 5 | 5 | 1998 | 2023 | Third place (2010) |
| Mexico | 6 | 3 | 1 | 1959 | 2023 | 8th (1967) |
| Russia | 5 | 3 | 0 | 1994 | 2019 | Runners-up (1994, 1998) |
| Senegal | 5 | 2 | 0 | 1978 | 2019 | 14th (1978) |
| Turkey | 5 | 5 | 0 | 2002 | 2019 | Runners-up (2010*) |
| Ivory Coast | 5 | 2 | 2 | 1982 | 2023 | 13th (1982, 1986) |
| Venezuela | 5 | 2 | 2 | 1990 | 2023 | 11th (1990) |
| Cuba | 4 | 2 | 0 | 1970 | 1994 | Fourth place (1974) |
| Czechoslovakia † | 4 | 4 | -- | 1970 | 1982 | 6th (1970) |
| Peru | 4 | 2 | 0 | 1950 | 1967 | 7th (1950) |
| Panama | 4 | 2 | 0 | 1970 | 2006 | 9th (1970, 1982) |
| Lebanon | 4 | 3 | 1 | 2002 | 2023 | 16th (2002) |
| Slovenia | 4 | 3 | 1 | 2006 | 2023 | 7th (2014, 2023) |
| Iran | 4 | 4 | 4 | 2010 | 2023 | 19th (2010) |
| Dominican Republic | 4 | 3 | 3 | 1978 | 2023 | 12th (1978) |
| Serbia | 4 | 4 | 4 | 2010 | 2023 | Runners-up (2014, 2023) |
| Chile | 3 | 3 | 0 | 1950 | 1959 | Third place (1950, 1959) |
| Serbia and Montenegro † | 3 | 3 | -- | 1998 | 2006 | Champions (1998, 2002) |
| Croatia | 3 | 2 | 0 | 1994 | 2014 | Third place (1994) |
| Nigeria | 3 | 1 | 0 | 1998 | 2019 | 9th (2006) |
| Jordan | 3 | 2 | 2 | 2010 | 2023 | 23rd (2010) |
| Chinese Taipei | 2 | 2 | 0 | 1954 | 1959 | Fourth place (1959) |
| Paraguay | 2 | 1 | 0 | 1954 | 1967 | 9th (1954) |
| Israel | 2 | 1 | 0 | 1954 | 1986 | 7th (1986) |
| Poland | 2 | 1 | 0 | 1967 | 2019 | 5th (1967) |
| Tunisia | 2 | 1 | 0 | 2010 | 2019 | 20th (2019) |
| Finland | 2 | 1 | 1 | 2014 | 2023 | 21st (2023) |
| Montenegro | 2 | 2 | 2 | 2019 | 2023 | 11th (2023) |
| Qatar | 2 | 1 | 1 | 2006 | 2027 | 21st (2006) |
| Ecuador | 1 | 1 | 0 | 1950 | 1950 | 8th (1950) |
| Bulgaria | 1 | 1 | 0 | 1959 | 1959 | 7th (1959) |
| Central African Republic | 1 | 1 | 0 | 1974 | 1974 | 14th (1974) |
| Colombia | 1 | 1 | 0 | 1982 | 1982 | 7th (1982*) |
| Malaysia | 1 | 1 | 0 | 1986 | 1986 | 13th (1986) |
| Netherlands | 1 | 1 | 0 | 1986 | 1986 | 13th (1986) |
| Algeria | 1 | 1 | 0 | 2002 | 2002 | 15th (2002) |
| Ukraine | 1 | 1 | 0 | 2014 | 2014 | 18th (2014) |
| Czech Republic | 1 | 1 | 0 | 2019 | 2019 | 6th (2019) |
| Latvia | 1 | 1 | 1 | 2023 | 2023 | 5th (2023) |
| Georgia | 1 | 1 | 1 | 2023 | 2023 | 16th (2023) |
| South Sudan | 1 | 1 | 1 | 2023 | 2023 | 17th (2023) |
| Cape Verde | 1 | 1 | 1 | 2023 | 2023 | 28th (2023) |

== Overall won/lost records ==
| Team | App | Played | Won | Lost | % |
|---|---|---|---|---|---|
| United States | 19 | 166 | 134 | 32 | 80.7 |
| Brazil | 19 | 145 | 87 | 58 | 60 |
| Spain | 17 | 105 | 74 | 31 | 70.5 |
| Soviet Union † | 9 | 80 | 66 | 14 | 82.5 |
| Argentina | 14 | 112 | 65 | 47 | 58 |
| Yugoslavia † | 10 | 78 | 58 | 20 | 74.4 |
| Italy | 10 | 82 | 47 | 35 | 57.3 |
| Australia | 13 | 98 | 43 | 55 | 43.9 |
| Puerto Rico | 15 | 103 | 43 | 60 | 41.7 |
| Canada | 15 | 115 | 45 | 70 | 39.1 |
| Greece | 9 | 66 | 38 | 28 | 57.6 |
| France | 9 | 68 | 37 | 31 | 54.4 |
| Lithuania | 6 | 49 | 33 | 16 | 67.3 |
| Germany | 7 | 49 | 31 | 18 | 63.3 |
| Russia | 5 | 39 | 25 | 14 | 64.1 |
| Turkey | 5 | 38 | 24 | 14 | 63.2 |
| Cuba | 4 | 35 | 18 | 17 | 51.4 |
| China | 10 | 68 | 18 | 50 | 26.5 |
| Uruguay | 7 | 50 | 17 | 33 | 34 |
| Mexico | 6 | 40 | 19 | 21 | 47.5 |
| Czechoslovakia † | 4 | 30 | 17 | 13 | 56.7 |
| Serbia | 4 | 34 | 23 | 11 | 67.6 |
| Serbia and Montenegro † | 3 | 24 | 17 | 7 | 70.8 |
| Angola | 9 | 56 | 16 | 40 | 28.6 |
| New Zealand | 7 | 42 | 17 | 25 | 40.5 |
| Philippines | 7 | 45 | 14 | 31 | 31.1 |
| Slovenia | 4 | 30 | 17 | 13 | 56.7 |
| Croatia | 3 | 20 | 12 | 8 | 60 |
| South Korea | 8 | 51 | 10 | 41 | 19.6 |
| Peru | 4 | 27 | 10 | 17 | 37 |
| Panama | 4 | 25 | 9 | 16 | 36 |
| Chile | 3 | 19 | 9 | 10 | 47.4 |
| Venezuela | 5 | 28 | 8 | 20 | 28.6 |
| Poland | 2 | 17 | 8 | 9 | 47.1 |
| Chinese Taipei | 2 | 18 | 7 | 11 | 38.9 |
| Israel | 2 | 19 | 7 | 12 | 36.8 |
| Nigeria | 3 | 16 | 7 | 9 | 43.8 |
| Egypt | 7 | 47 | 8 | 39 | 17 |
| Dominican Republic | 4 | 23 | 9 | 14 | 39.1 |
| Japan | 6 | 36 | 8 | 28 | 22.2 |
| Bulgaria | 1 | 9 | 5 | 4 | 55.6 |
| Senegal | 5 | 28 | 4 | 24 | 14.3 |
| Iran | 4 | 20 | 4 | 16 | 20 |
| Latvia | 1 | 8 | 6 | 2 | 75 |
| South Sudan | 1 | 5 | 3 | 2 | 60 |
| Czech Republic | 1 | 8 | 4 | 4 | 50 |
| Lebanon | 4 | 20 | 5 | 15 | 25 |
| Paraguay | 2 | 13 | 3 | 10 | 23.1 |
| Tunisia | 2 | 10 | 3 | 7 | 30 |
| Montenegro | 2 | 10 | 4 | 6 | 40 |
| Ecuador | 1 | 5 | 2 | 3 | 40 |
| Netherlands | 1 | 5 | 2 | 3 | 40 |
| Ukraine | 1 | 5 | 2 | 3 | 40 |
| Finland | 2 | 10 | 3 | 7 | 30 |
| Georgia | 1 | 5 | 2 | 3 | 40 |
| Algeria | 1 | 5 | 1 | 4 | 20 |
| Cape Verde | 1 | 5 | 1 | 4 | 20 |
| Ivory Coast | 5 | 27 | 2 | 25 | 7.4 |
| Jordan | 3 | 15 | 1 | 14 | 6.7 |
| Central African Republic | 1 | 7 | 0 | 7 | 0 |
| Colombia | 1 | 6 | 0 | 6 | 0 |
| Malaysia | 1 | 5 | 0 | 5 | 0 |
| Qatar | 1 | 5 | 0 | 5 | 0 |

== Performance of host nations ==
With only three wins in 16 occasions, the success rate of host nations winning the tournament is rather low at 19%, compared to the respective percentage in the FIFA World Cup which stands at 32% (6 out of 19). Yugoslavia was the last host to win, in 1970; the only other host to medal since then has been Turkey, silver medalist in 2010. Greece has been the only other host nation to finish fourth or better since 1970. From 1959 to 1982, the host qualified directly to the final round of the tournament, bypassing the preliminary round (group stage). The host's final rank in these years could not be worse than the number of teams in the final round (between six and eight). However, beginning in 1986, the host has competed in the preliminary round.

A "†" denotes that is the best performance of the team, a "‡" denotes it is the best performance of the team at the time of the competition.

| Year | Host nation(s) | Finish | Last round* |
|---|---|---|---|
| 1950 | Argentina | Champions† | Final round |
| 1954 | Brazil | Runners-up‡ | Final round |
| 1959 | Chile | Third place† | Final round |
| 1963 | Brazil | Champions† | Final round |
| 1967 | Uruguay | Seventh place | Final round |
| 1970 | Yugoslavia | Champions† | Final round |
| 1974 | Puerto Rico | Seventh place | Final round |
| 1978 | Philippines | Eighth place | Final round |
| 1982 | Colombia | Seventh place† | Final round |
| 1986 | Spain | Fifth place‡ | Final round |
| 1990 | Argentina | Eighth place | Second round |
| 1994 | Canada | Seventh place | Preliminary round |
| 1998 | Greece | Fourth place‡ | Third place playoff |
| 2002 | United States | Sixth place | Quarter-finals |
| 2006 | Japan | Seventeenth place | Preliminary round |
| 2010 | Turkey | Runners-up† | Final |
| 2014 | Spain | Fifth place | Quarter-finals |
| 2019 | China | 24th place | Preliminary round |
| 2023 | Philippines | 24th place | Preliminary round |
| 2023 | Japan | 19th place | Preliminary round |
| 2023 | Indonesia | Did not qualify | Did not qualify |
| 2027 | Qatar | TBD | TBD |
| 2031 | France | TBD | TBD |

*excluding classification rounds.

== Performance of defending finalists ==
| Year | Defending champions | Finish | Defending runners-up | Finish |
|---|---|---|---|---|
| 1954 | Argentina | Did not participate | United States | Champions |
| 1959 | United States | Runners-up | Brazil | Champions |
| 1963 | Brazil | Champions | United States | Fourth place |
| 1967 | Brazil | Third place | Yugoslavia | Runners-up |
| 1970 | Soviet Union | Third place | Yugoslavia | Champions |
| 1974 | Yugoslavia | Runners-up | Brazil | Sixth place |
| 1978 | Soviet Union | Runners-up | Yugoslavia | Champions |
| 1982 | Yugoslavia | Third place | Soviet Union | Champions |
| 1986 | Soviet Union | Runners-up | United States | Champions |
| 1990 | United States | Third place | Soviet Union | Runners-up |
| 1994 | Yugoslavia | Dissolved | Soviet Union | Dissolved |
| 1998 | United States | Third place | Russia | Runners-up |
| 2002 | FR Yugoslavia | Champions | Russia | Tenth place |
| 2006 | Serbia and Montenegro | Round of 16 | Argentina | Fourth place |
| 2010 | Spain | Sixth place | Greece | Eleventh place |
| 2014 | United States | Champions | Turkey | Eighth place |
| 2019 | United States | Seventh place | Serbia | Fifth place |
| 2023 | Spain | Ninth place | Argentina | Did not qualify |
| 2027 | Germany | | Serbia | |
| 2031 | | | | |

== Performance by confederation ==
This is a summary of the best performances of each confederation in each tournament. Note that most confederations did not exist until up to the 1960s, and that FIBA assigned teams to a specific continent when there were no confederations yet.

| Confederation | 1950 (Argentina) (10) | 1954 (Brazil) (12) | 1959 (Chile) (13) | 1963 (Brazil) (13) | 1967 (Uruguay) (13) | 1970 (Socialist Federal Republic of Yugoslavia) (13) | 1974 (Puerto Rico) (14) | 1978 (Philippines) (14) | 1982 (Colombia) (13) | 1986 (Spain) (24) | 1990 (Argentina) (16) | 1994 (Canada) (16) | 1998 (Greece) (16) | 2002 (United States) (16) | 2006 (Japan) (24) | 2010 (Turkey) (24) | 2014 (Spain) (24) | 2019 (China) (32) | 2023 (Philippines) (Japan) (Indonesia) (32) | 2027 (Qatar) (32) | 2031 (France) (32) |
|---|---|---|---|---|---|---|---|---|---|---|---|---|---|---|---|---|---|---|---|---|---|
| FIBA Africa | 5th | ― | 11th | ― | ― | 13th | 14th | 14th | 13th | 13th | 13th | 14th | 13th | 15th | 9th | 15th | 16th | 17th | 17th | TBD | TBD |
| FIBA Americas | 1st | 1st | 1st | 1st | 3rd | 2nd | 3rd | 3rd | 2nd | 1st | 3rd | 1st | 3rd | 2nd | 3rd | 1st | 1st | 2nd | 3rd | TBD | TBD |
| FIBA Asia | ― | 3rd | 4th | 13th | 11th | 11th | 13th | 8th | 12th | 9th | 14th | 8th | 14th | 12th | 9th | 16th | 20th | 23rd | 19th | TBD | TBD |
| FIBA Europe | 6th | 4th | 6th | 2nd | 1st | 1st | 1st | 1st | 1st | 2nd | 1st | 2nd | 1st | 1st | 1st | 2nd | 2nd | 1st | 1st | TBD | TBD |
| FIBA Oceania | ― | ― | ― | ― | ― | 12th | 12th | 7th | 5th | 13th | 7th | 5th | 9th | 4th | 9th | 10th | 12th | 4th | 10th | TBD | TBD |

== Number of teams by confederation ==
This is a summary of the total number of participating teams by confederation in each tournament. The number of teams in the confederation of a host federation is boldfaced.

| Confederation | 1950 (Argentina) (10) | 1954 (Brazil) (12) | 1959 (Chile) (13) | 1963 (Brazil) (13) | 1967 (Uruguay) (13) | 1970 (Socialist Federal Republic of Yugoslavia) (13) | 1974 (Puerto Rico) (14) | 1978 (Philippines) (14) | 1982 (Colombia) (13) | 1986 (Spain) (24) | 1990 (Argentina) (16) | 1994 (Canada) (16) | 1998 (Greece) (16) | 2002 (United States) (16) | 2006 (Japan) (24) | 2010 (Turkey) (24) | 2014 (Spain) (24) | 2019 (China) (32) | 2023 (Philippines) (Japan) (Indonesia) (32) | 2027 (Qatar) (32) | 2031 (France) (32) |
|---|---|---|---|---|---|---|---|---|---|---|---|---|---|---|---|---|---|---|---|---|---|
| FIBA Africa | 1 | 0 | 1 | 0 | 0 | 1 | 1 | 1 | 1 | 2 | 2 | 2 | 2 | 2 | 3 | 3 | 3 | 5 | 5 | 5 | 5 |
| FIBA Americas | **6** | **7** | **8** | **8** | **8** | 6 | **6** | 5 | **6** | 8 | **6** | **6** | 5 | **6** | 6 | 5 | 6 | 7 | 7 | 7 | 7 |
| FIBA Asia | 0 | 2 | 2 | 1 | 1 | 1 | 1 | **3** | 1 | 3 | 2 | 2 | 2 | 2 | **4** | 4 | 3 | **6** | **6** | **6** | 6 |
| FIBA Europe | 3 | 3 | 2 | 4 | 4 | **4** | 4 | 4 | 4 | **9** | 5 | 5 | **6** | 5 | 9 | **10** | **10** | 12 | 12 | 12 | **12** |
| FIBA Oceania | 0 | 0 | 0 | 0 | 0 | 1 | 1 | 1 | 1 | 2 | 1 | 1 | 1 | 1 | 2 | 2 | 2 | 2 | 2 | 2 | 2 |
