= Mladost Hall =

Multi-purpose indoor arena in Karlovac, Croatia

- Interactive map of Mladost Hall
- Location: Karlovac, Croatia
- Capacity: 2,800
- Surface: parquet

Construction
- Built: 1967

Tenant
- HRK Karlovac

Mladost Hall is a multi-purpose indoor arena located in Karlovac, Croatia. Its capacity is 2,800 and it is mostly used for handball matches as the home ground of HRK Karlovac. In the past it was also home ground for famous, now defunct, basketball team KK Željezničar Karlovac.

It hosted 1970 FIBA World Championship and Eurobasket 1975, as well as 2003 World Women's Handball Championship.
