= Kirby Minter =

American basketball player (1929–2009)

Personal information
- Born: November 23, 1929 Marietta, Oklahoma, U.S.
- Died: August 11, 2009 (aged 79) Oklahoma City, Oklahoma, U.S.
- Listed height: 6 ft 6 in (1.98 m)
- Listed weight: 200 lb (91 kg)

Career information
- High school: Durant (Durant, Oklahoma)
- College: Southeastern Oklahoma State (1947–1950)
- NBA draft: 1950: undrafted
- Position: Forward

Career highlights
- FIBA World Cup MVP (1954)

James Kirby Minter (born November 23, 1929 – August 11, 2009) was an American basketball player. At a height of 6 ft 6 in (1.98 m) tall, he played at the forward position. He was the FIBA World Cup MVP at the 1954 FIBA World Championship.

== College career ==
Minter, who was born in Marietta, Oklahoma, attended and graduated from Durant High School in 1947, where he also played high school basketball. After high school, Minter played College basketball at Southeastern Oklahoma State University, with the Savage Storm, from 1947 to 1950.

== National team career ==
As a member of a Peoria Caterpillars AAU team, which was composed of the Caterpillar company's employees, he represented the United States men's national basketball team at the 1954 FIBA World Championship, and he was named the Most Valuable Player of the competition. Minter scored a total of 100 points (11.1 points per game) during the tournament.

== Death ==
Minter died on August 11, 2009, in Oklahoma City.
