= United Arab Republic men's national basketball team =

United Arab Republic
- Joined FIBA: 1958
- FIBA zone: FIBA Africa
- National federation: United Arab Republic Basketball Federation

FIBA World Cup
- Appearances: 2

AfroBasket
- Appearances: 3
- Medals: Gold: (1962, 1964, 1970)
Home	Away

The United Arab Republic national basketball team (Arabic: منتخب الجمهورية العربية المتحدة لكرة السلة للرجال) was a historical national basketball team that existed between the year 1958–1971 that has represented first the United Arab Republic which was a union between Egypt (including the occupied Gaza Strip) and Syria from 1958 to 1961 and then the name has continued with Egypt until the year 1971.

== History ==
The United Arab Republic men's national basketball team has since the foundation back in 1958 won three African Championships from 3 appearances and has participated in two World Championships but has no Olympic appearances.

== Performance table ==
=== FIBA World Cup ===
Year	Position	Tournament	Hosts
1959	11	1959 FIBA World Championship	Chile
1970	13	1970 FIBA World Championship	Yugoslavia

=== FIBA Africa Championship ===
Year	Position	Tournament	Hosts
1962	1st place, gold medalist(s)	FIBA Africa Championship 1962	Cairo, United Arab Republic
1964	1st place, gold medalist(s)	FIBA Africa Championship 1964	Casablanca, Morocco
1965	–	FIBA Africa Championship 1965	Tunis, Tunisia
1968	–	FIBA Africa Championship 1968	Casablanca, Morocco
1970	1st place, gold medalist(s)	FIBA Africa Championship 1970	Alexandria, United Arab Republic

=== African Games ===
Year	Position	Tournament	Hosts
1965	1st place, gold medalist(s)	1965 All-Africa Games	Congo

=== Pan Arab Games ===
Year	Position	Tournament	Hosts
1961	1st place, gold medalist(s)	1961 Pan Arab Games	
1965	1st place, gold medalist(s)	1965 Pan Arab Games	

=== Mediterranean Games ===
Year	Position	Tournament	Hosts
1959	3rd place, bronze medalist(s)	1959 Mediterranean Games	Beirut
