= Rodolfo Salas =

Peruvian basketball player

Personal information
- Born: 25 May 1928; Lima, Peru
- Died: 18 August 2010 (aged 82)

Sport
- Sport: Basketball

Rodolfo Fernando Salas Crespo (25 May 1928 – 18 August 2010) was a Peruvian basketball player. He competed in the men's tournament at the 1948 Summer Olympics.
