= Carl Ridd =

Canadian basketball player, activist, and religion scholar

The Reverend Carl Ridd
- Born: John Carl Ridd; 17 August 1929; Winnipeg, Manitoba
- Died: 29 March 2003 (aged 73); Winnipeg, Manitoba
- Occupations: Scholar, basketball player, activist
- Spouse: Beverley Tozer (m. 1952)

Academic background
- Education: University of Manitoba; United College; Drew University
- Thesis: 'The Image of Man in Albert Camus' (1977)

Academic work
- Discipline: Religious studies
- Institutions: University of Winnipeg

Ecclesiastical career
- Religion: Christianity
- Church: United Church of Canada
- Ordained: 1958
- Congregations: Emerson – Dominion City pastoral charge, Manitoba (1958–1963); Eastside Terrace Methodist Church, Paterson, New Jersey (1964–1966)
- Basketball career

Career information
- College: University of Manitoba (1947–1951)
- Playing career: 1951–1955

Career history
- 195?–195?: Winnipeg Paulins

Career highlights
- FIBA World Championships All-Tournament second team (1954); Canadian Basketball Hall of Fame (1980)

John Carl Ridd (17 August 1929 – 29 March 2003) was a Canadian scholar of religion, basketball player, and activist.

== Early life and basketball career ==
Carl Ridd was born in Winnipeg, Manitoba, on 17 August 1929, the son of Dwight Nugent Ridd. He began playing basketball at Westminster United Church and then for Gordon Bell High School. Ridd went on to play for the University of Manitoba from 1947 to 1951 where he was the leading scorer in North America College Basketball, averaging 25 points a game. In 1952 the National Basketball Association's Milwaukee Hawks offered Ridd a contract. Ridd turned the offer down.

Ridd was a starting member of the Canadian basketball team for the 1952 Summer Olympics in Helsinki, Finland. Ridd played in all six matches for the team, which was eliminated after the group stage in the 1952 tournament. Two years later, Ridd played in the 1954 World Championship in Rio de Janeiro, Brazil, where he was the first and only Canadian to be chosen for the tournament's all-star team (2nd team All-Star). He recorded 37 points in one game at the World Championship, a Canadian tournament record that would last for 69 years, being broken by Dillon Brooks at the 2023 edition.

Ridd was inducted into the Canadian Basketball Hall of Fame in 1980, and the Manitoba Sports Hall of Fame and Museum in 1983.

== Death ==
On 29 March 2003 Ridd died from leukemia at the age of 74 years.
