= Abraham Shneior =

Israeli basketball player (1928–1998)

Abraham Shneior אברהם שניאור
Personal information
- Born: December 9, 1928 Mandatory Palestine
- Died: February 24, 1998 (aged 69)
- Listed height: 6 ft 1.25 in (1.86 m)

Career information
- Playing career: 1945–1959
- Position: Center
- Number: 3
- Coaching career: 1959–1965

Career history

Playing
- 1945–1959: Maccabi Tel Aviv

Coaching
- 1959–1960: Hapoel Holon
- 1961–1962: Hapoel Haifa
- 1962–1963: Hapoel Givat Brenner
- 1963–1964: Maccabi Petah Tikva
- 1964–1965: Hapoel Haifa

Career highlights
- As player: 5× Israeli Premier League champion (1954, 1955, 1957–1959); 3× Israeli State Cup winner (1956, 1958, 1959); Israeli Premier League Top Scorer (1954)
Medals
Men's basketball
Representing Israel
Maccabiah Games
Silver medal – second place	1953 Tel Aviv

Abraham Shneior (alternate spellings: "Avraham" and "Schneior", "Shneur", "Shneor", "Schneor", or "Shaneir"; Hebrew: אברהם שניאור; December 9, 1928 – February 24, 1998) was an Israeli basketball player and coach. During his club playing career, Shneior was the Israeli Premier League's Top Scorer in 1954. Shneior also represented Israel's national team at the 1952 Helsiniki Summer Olympic Games.

== Club career ==
Shneior, who was born in Mandatory Palestine, played club basketball with Maccabi Tel Aviv, of the Israeli Premier League. During his time with Maccabi, he was the captain of the team.

== National team career ==
Shneior competed for the senior men's Israeli national team. He was the first Team Captain of Israel's national team. He was a part of the Israel at the 1952 Summer Olympics team in Helsinki, at the age of 23. He was the flag bearer for Team Israel at the Olympics. In the Olympic Basketball Tournament, the Israeli national team came in tied for 20th place, after losing to the Philippines, by a score or 57–47, in a game in which he scored 8 points, and losing to Greece, by a score of 54–52, in a game in which he scored 12 points. When he competed in the Olympics he was 6 feet 1 inch (185 cm) tall.

He won a silver medal with Team Israel in the 1953 Maccabiah Games.

He was also on the Israeli national team in the 1954 FIBA World Championship, in which he led the team with an average of 10.8 points per game, and Israel came in 8th place out of 12 teams.

While playing for Israel at the 1953 FIBA EuroBasket, he averaged 9.7 points per game, and while playing for Israel at the 1959 FIBA EuroBasket, he averaged 4.3 points per game.

== Coaching career ==
After he retired from playing club basketball, Shneior worked as a basketball coach. He was the head coach of the Israeli basketball clubs Hapoel Holon, Hapoel Haifa, Hapoel Givat Brenner, and Maccabi Petah Tikva.
