= Ginásio do Maracanãzinho =

Indoor arena in Brazil

Maracanãzinho Gymnasium Ginásio do Maracanãzinho
- Maracanãzinho
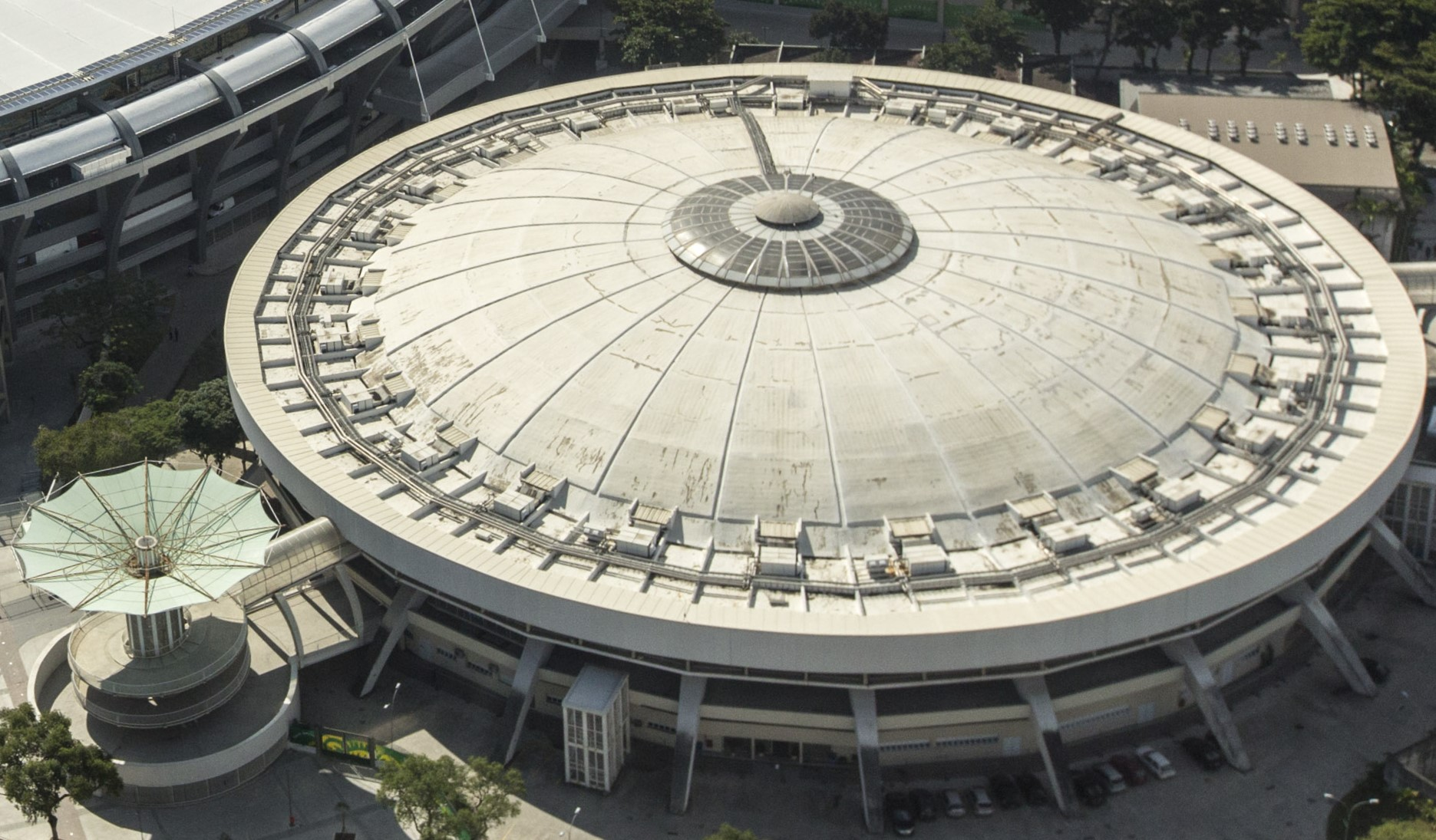
- Exterior view of the Maracanãzinho in 2013
- Interactive map of Maracanãzinho Gymnasium; Ginásio do Maracanãzinho
- Full name: Ginásio Gilberto Cardoso
- Location: Rio de Janeiro, Brazil
- Coordinates: 22°54′50.08″S 43°13′45.60″W
- Owner: Superintendência de Desportos do Estado do Rio de Janeiro
- Capacity: Futsal: 11,800; Basketball: 11,800
- Surface: 800 m^{2}
- Record attendance: 35,000 (1954 FIBA World Championship Medal Round match: USA 62–41 Brazil)
- Field size: 40x20m

Construction
- Groundbreaking: April 1954
- Opened: September 24, 1954
- Renovated: October 2003 – June 30, 2004; 2007
- Closed: October 2003
- Reopened: June 30, 2004
- Cost: 97 million R$ (2003 renovations)
- Architects: Galvão, Bastos, Azevedo and Carneiro, Herzog & de Meuron (restoration)
- Main contractors: Prolar S.A. Odebrecht (restoration)

Tenants
- Brazil women's national volleyball team Flamengo Basketball (NBB) (2008–2009)

Ginásio Gilberto Cardoso, commonly known as the Maracanãzinho ("Little Maracanã" or "Mini Maracanã"), is an indoor arena located in Maracanã in the north zone of Rio de Janeiro, Brazil. It is used mostly for volleyball. Its formal name, Ginásio Gilberto Cardoso, honors a former Clube de Regatas do Flamengo president. The capacity of the arena is 11,800 and it was opened in 1954. It is part of a complex that includes the adjacent Maracanã Stadium, an association football stadium.

== History ==
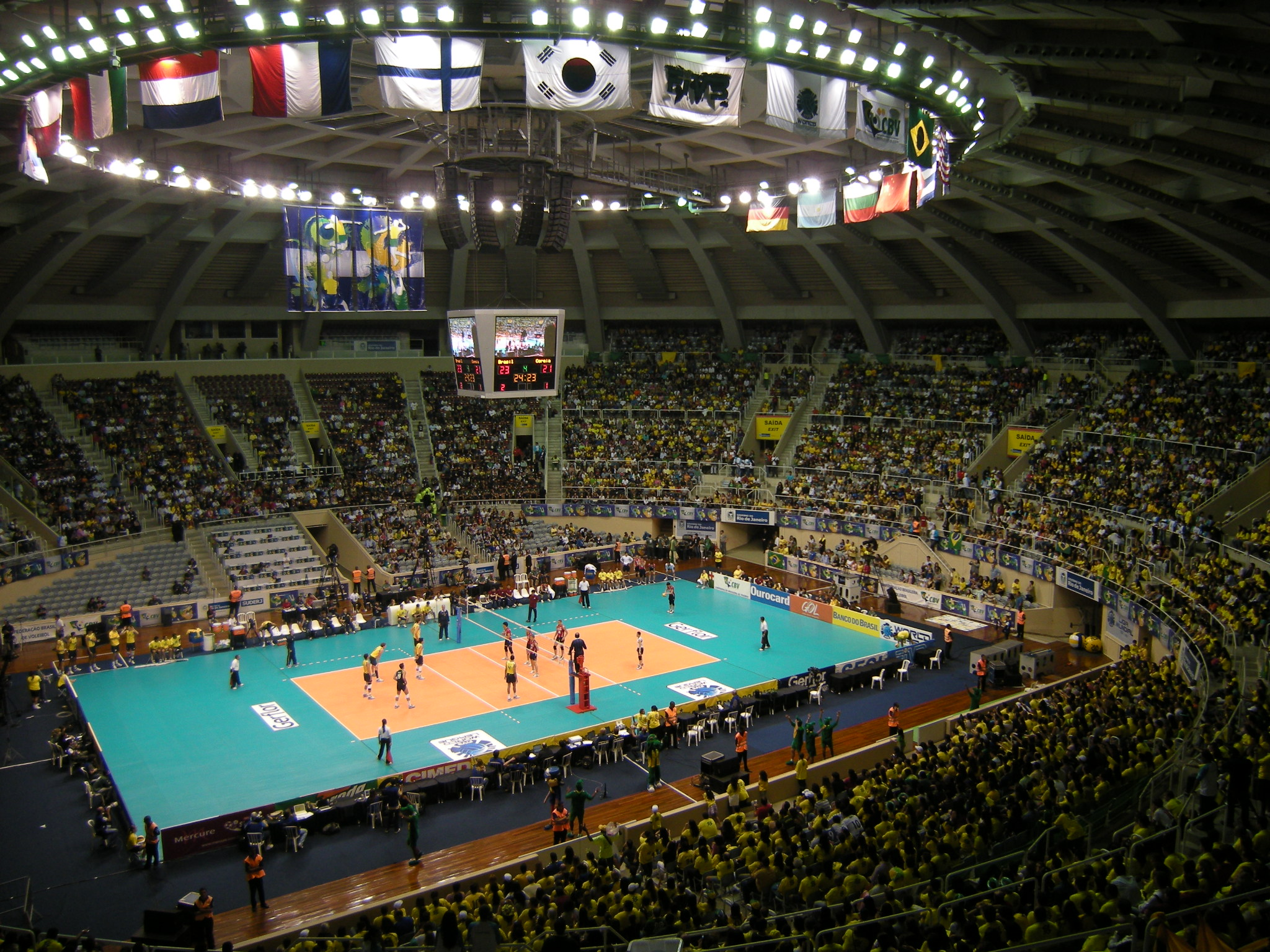
Inside the Maracanãzinho during a volleyball game at the 2010 World League.

The Maracanãzinho's construction started on April 13, 1954 and lasted five months. It was built by Construtora Prolar S.A. The architects were Rafael Galvão, Pedro Paulo Bernardes Bastos, Orlando Azevedo and Antônio Dias Carneiro, the engineer was Joaquim Cardoso. The gymnasium was inaugurated on September 24, 1954, with that year's Men's Basketball World Championship, for which it had a capacity for 25,000 spectators. The arena also hosted the 1963 event of the same competition, with the home team, coached by Kanela taking the gold medal, its second Men's Basketball World Championship in a row.

During the 1950s and the 1960s, the Miss Guanabara and Miss Brasil beauty pageants were held inside the Maracanãzinho, as well as the 1960 and 1990 Men's Volleyball World Championship finals.

At the age of 32, Simone Bittencourt de Oliveira became the first female singer to fill the Maracanãzinho in 1981.

The 2013 World Judo Championships was held in Maracanãzinho.

The Maracanãzinho hosted UFC 179 in October 2014 and UFC Fight Night: Maia vs. LaFlare in March 2015, as well as volleyball at the 2016 Summer Olympics.

In 2013, WWE.com claimed the arena was the site of the 1979 WWE Intercontinental Championship tournament, an April Fools' Day prank.

== Renovations ==
For the 2007 Pan American Games, the gym was remodeled, with new central air conditioning, an added four-sided scoreboard, a new sound system, a dome which allows natural lighting during the day, new comfortable seating, and adaptions to all international requirements. As a result, the Maracanãzinho became a venue for the volleyball competitions of the 2007 Pan American Games, and many other international competitions. After the renovations, the capacity of the arena was reduced from approximately 13,000 to 11,800 spectators for futsal. The arena became much more comfortable for spectators, as the field of vision was increased for better viewing of the arena floor.

== Concerts ==
The arena has also hosted a number of important rock concerts, including, among others, the following list:

- Rita Lee
- Nat King Cole
- Jackson Five
- Legião Urbana
- Engenheiros do Hawaii
- Earth, Wind & Fire
- Genesis
- Alice Cooper
- The Cure
- New Order
- Deep Purple
- The Police
- Midnight Oil
- Peter Frampton
- Van Halen
- Megadeth
- Metallica
- Quiet Riot
- Secos & Molhados
- Skid Row
- Iron Maiden
- Information Society (band)
- Faith No More
- Motörhead
- Jethro Tull
- Venom

== See also ==
- List of indoor arenas in Brazil
- List of indoor arenas by capacity

Events and tenants
| Preceded by Luna Park; Buenos Aires | FIBA World Cup; Final Venue; 1954 | Succeeded by Estadio Nacional de Chile; Santiago |
| Preceded by Estadio Nacional de Chile; Santiago | FIBA World Cup; Final Venue; 1963 | Succeeded by Cilindro Municipal; Montevideo |
| Preceded by National Taiwan University Sports Center; Taipei City | FIFA Futsal World Cup; Final Venue; 2008 | Succeeded by Hua Mark Indoor Stadium; Bangkok |
| Preceded by Nelson Mandela Forum; Florence | FIVB Volleyball World League; Final Venue; 2015 | Succeeded by Tauron Arena; Kraków |
