= 1954 FIBA World Championship =

1954 edition of the FIBA World Championship

FIBA Campeonato Mundial de Basquetebol Masculino de 1954

Tournament details
- Host country: Brazil
- City: Rio de Janeiro
- Dates: 23 October – 5 November
- Officially opened by: Café Filho
- Teams: 12
- Venue: Ginásio do Maracanãzinho

Final positions
- Champions: United States (1st title)
- Runners-up: Brazil
- Third place: Philippines
- Fourth place: France

Tournament statistics
- Games played: 46
- MVP: (United States) Kirby Minter
- Top scorer: (Uruguay) Oscar Moglia (18.7 points per game)

The 1954 FIBA World Championship (also called the 2nd World Basketball Championship – 1954) was the international basketball world championship for men's national teams. It was held by the International Basketball Federation, from 23 October to 5 November 1954. Brazil hosted the event at Ginásio do Maracanãzinho in Rio de Janeiro. Twelve nations participated in the tournament.

== Competing nations ==
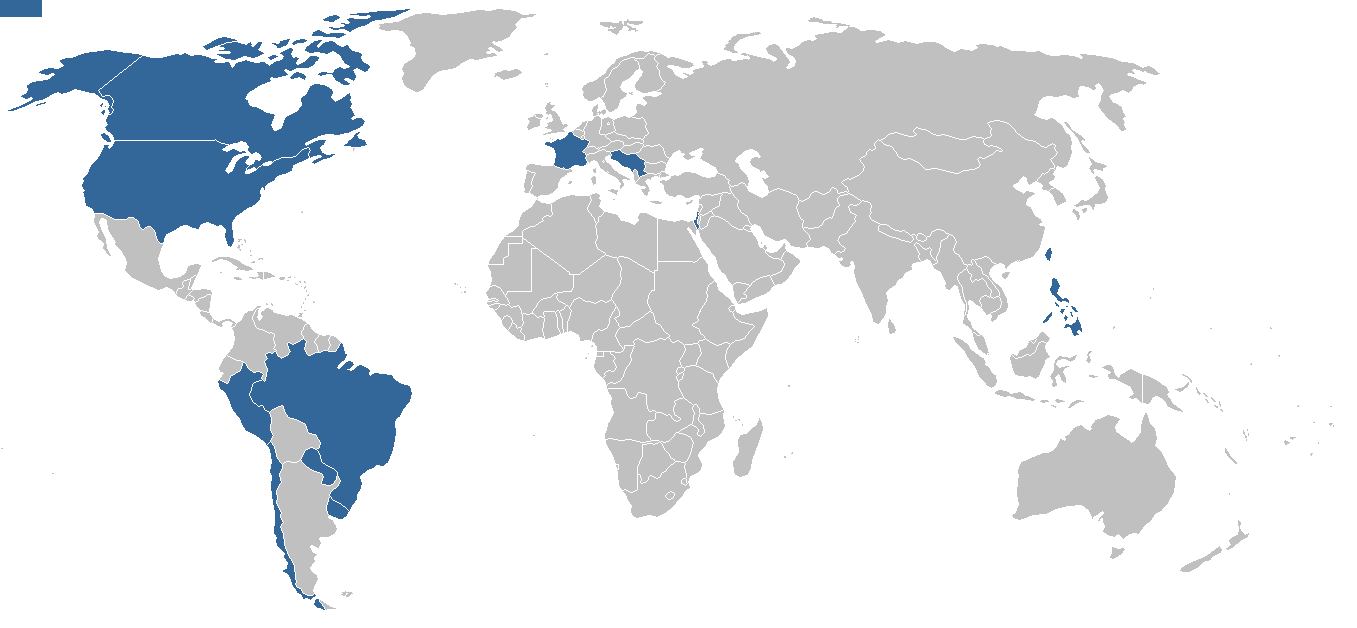
Teams competed

Group A	Group B	Group C	Group D
Brazil; Paraguay; Philippines	Canada; Peru; United States	France; Uruguay; Yugoslavia	Chile; Formosa; Israel

== Preliminary round ==
=== Group A ===
Pos	Team	Pld	W	L	PF	PA	PD	Pts	Qualification
1	Brazil (H)	2	2	0	160	114	+46	4	Final round
2	Philippines	2	1	1	126	151	−25	3	Final round
3	Paraguay	2	0	2	104	125	−21	2	Classification round

Source: FIBA archive
Rules for classification: 1) points; 2) head-to-head points; 3) head-to-head goal average; 4) head-to-head number of points scored.
(H) Hosts

23 October
21:00

Philippines	64–52	Paraguay
Scoring by half: 26–27, 38–25
Pts: Loyzaga 15		Pts: Zapattini 22

Ginásio do Maracanãzinho, Rio de Janeiro

24 October
21:45

Brazil	99–62	Philippines
Scoring by half: 44–22, 55–40
Pts: Bonfietti 18		Pts: Mumar 22

Ginásio do Maracanãzinho, Rio de Janeiro

25 October
21:10

Paraguay	52–61	Brazil
Scoring by half: 17–33, 35–28
Pts: Bendlin 13		Pts: Facci 14

Ginásio do Maracanãzinho, Rio de Janeiro

=== Group B ===
Pos	Team	Pld	W	L	PF	PA	PD	Pts	Qualification
1	United States	2	2	0	132	88	+44	4	Final round
2	Canada	2	1	1	105	117	−12	3	Final round
3	Peru	2	0	2	109	141	−32	2	Classification round

Source: FIBA archive
Rules for classification: 1) points; 2) head-to-head points; 3) head-to-head goal average; 4) head-to-head number of points scored.

23 October
22:30

Canada	37–59	United States
Scoring by half: 18–33, 19–26
Pts: Ridd 11		Pts: Minter 16

Ginásio do Maracanãzinho, Rio de Janeiro

24 October
23:12

Peru	51–73	United States
Scoring by half: 26–24, 25–49
Pts: Chocano 15		Pts: Johnson 22

Ginásio do Maracanãzinho, Rio de Janeiro

25 October
19:00

Canada	68–58	Peru
Scoring by half: 28–33, 40–25
Pts: Ridd 25		Pts: Salas 20

Ginásio do Maracanãzinho, Rio de Janeiro

=== Group C ===
Pos	Team	Pld	W	L	PF	PA	PD	Pts	Qualification
1	Uruguay	2	2	0	113	98	+15	4	Final round
2	France	2	1	1	113	118	−5	3	Final round
3	Yugoslavia	2	0	2	112	122	−10	2	Classification round

Source: FIBA archive
Rules for classification: 1) points; 2) head-to-head points; 3) head-to-head goal average; 4) head-to-head number of points scored.

24 October
18:30

Yugoslavia	52–55 (OT)	Uruguay
Scoring by half: 23–23, 28–28 Overtime: 1–4
Pts: Ćurčić 17		Pts: Moglia 22

Ginásio do Maracanãzinho, Rio de Janeiro

25 October
22:50

France	67–60	Yugoslavia
Scoring by half: 33–26, 34–34
Pts: Beugnot 25		Pts: Ćurčić 16

Ginásio do Maracanãzinho, Rio de Janeiro

26 October

Uruguay	58–46	France
Scoring by half: 34–15, 24–31
Pts: Lombardo 14		Pts: Haudegand 11

Ginásio do Maracanãzinho, Rio de Janeiro

=== Group D ===
Pos	Team	Pld	W	L	PF	PA	PD	Pts	Qualification
1	Formosa	2	1	1	115	113	+2	3	Final round
2	Israel	2	1	1	100	98	+2	3	Final round
3	Chile	2	1	1	117	121	−4	3	Classification round

Source: FIBA archive
Rules for classification: 1) points; 2) head-to-head points; 3) head-to-head goal average; 4) head-to-head number of points scored.

24 October
18:30

Israel	45–49	Formosa
Scoring by half: 27–25, 18–24
Pts: Cohen 12		Pts: Tong S.F. 18

Ginásio do Maracanãzinho, Rio de Janeiro

25 October
19:00

Formosa	66–68	Chile
Scoring by half: 28–27, 38–41
Pts: Tong S.F. 19		Pts: Badria 22

Ginásio do Maracanãzinho, Rio de Janeiro

26 October
22:15

Israel	55–49	Chile
Scoring by half: 18–25, 37–24
Pts: Schneor 21		Pts: Badria 13

Ginásio do Maracanãzinho, Rio de Janeiro

== Classification round ==
All teams play one game against each other for a total of three games.

Pos	Team	Pld	W	L	PF	PA	PD	Pts
9	Paraguay	3	3	0	193	177	+16	6
10	Chile	3	2	1	179	170	+9	5
11	Yugoslavia	3	1	2	210	221	−11	4
12	Peru	3	0	3	190	204	−14	3

Source: FIBA archive
Rules for classification: 1) points; 2) head-to-head points; 3) head-to-head goal average; 4) head-to-head number of points scored.

29 October
17:30

Yugoslavia	62–70	Chile
Scoring by half: 25–35, 37–35
Pts: Muller 13		Pts: Badria 21

Ginásio do Maracanãzinho, Rio de Janeiro

30 October
17:30

Paraguay	66–58	Peru
Scoring by half: 28–34, 38–24
Pts: Yegros 19		Pts: Salas 25

Ginásio do Maracanãzinho, Rio de Janeiro

31 October
17:30

Yugoslavia	86–84 (OT)	Peru
Scoring by half: 39–44, 42–37 Overtime: 5–3
Pts: Muller 21		Pts: Salas 30

Ginásio do Maracanãzinho, Rio de Janeiro

1 November
17:30

Chile	57–60	Paraguay
Scoring by half: 30–22, 27–38
Pts: Badria 14		Pts: Isusi 18

Ginásio do Maracanãzinho, Rio de Janeiro

3 November
17:30

Yugoslavia	62–67	Paraguay
Scoring by half: 28–37, 34–30
Pts: Bjegojević 16		Pts: Isusi 21

Ginásio do Maracanãzinho, Rio de Janeiro

4 November
22:00

Peru	48–52	Chile
Scoring by half: 25–30, 23–22
Pts: Salas 13		Pts: Badria 12

Ginásio do Maracanãzinho, Rio de Janeiro

== Final round ==
All teams play one game against each other for a total of seven games. The teams with the best records are awarded medals.

Pos	Team	Pld	W	L	PF	PA	PD	Pts
1	United States (C)	7	7	0	482	300	+182	14
2	Brazil (H)	7	6	1	418	341	+77	13
3	Philippines	7	5	2	438	406	+32	12
4	France	7	3	4	371	392	−21	10
5	Formosa	7	2	5	345	405	−60	9 (Note: Head-to-head record: Formosa 1–1 (1.06 GAvg), Uruguay 1–1 (1.03 GAvg), Canada 1–1 (0.91 GAvg))
6	Uruguay	7	2	5	422	446	−24	9
7	Canada	7	2	5	433	498	−65	9
8	Israel	7	1	6	330	451	−121	8

Source: FIBA archive
Rules for classification: 1) points; 2) head-to-head points; 3) head-to-head goal average; 4) head-to-head number of points scored.
(C) Champions; (H) Hosts
Notes:

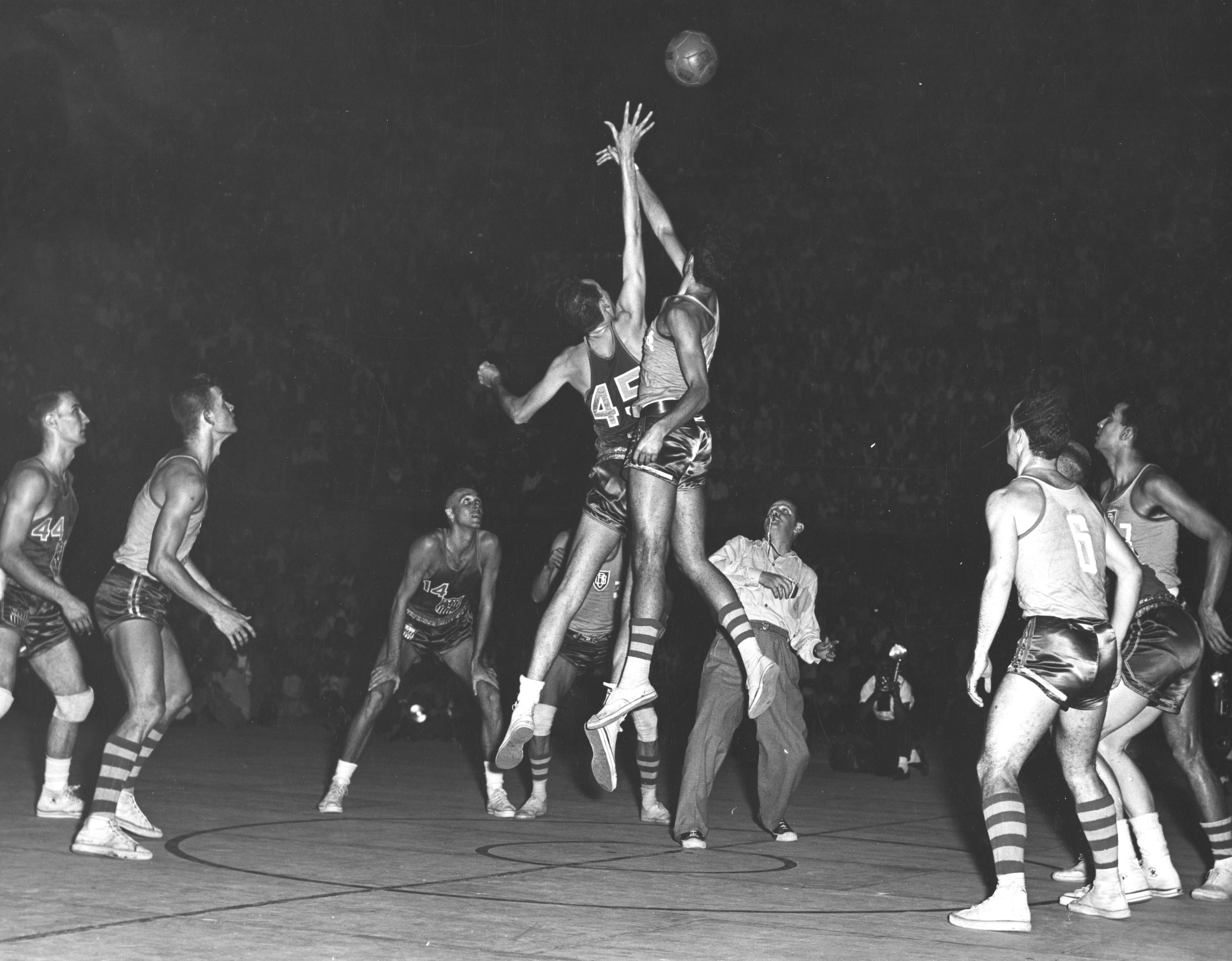
Photograph of the United States Basketball Team Playing Brazil in the Title Game

27 October
22:35

Canada	50–43	Israel
Scoring by half: 33–22, 17–21
Pts: Ridd 13		Pts: Cohen 13

Ginásio do Maracanãzinho, Rio de Janeiro
Referees: Alberto Pedro (PAR), Noli Coutinho (BRA)

27 October

France	57–49	Uruguay
Scoring by half: 23–22, 34–27
Pts: Buffière 11		Pts: Moglia 19

Ginásio do Maracanãzinho, Rio de Janeiro
Referees: Earl Schlup (USA), Angelo Benvenuto (CHI)

27 October

Formosa	44–61	Brazil
Scoring by half: 26–32, 18–29
Pts: Wang Y.J. 16		Pts: Marques 14

Ginásio do Maracanãzinho, Rio de Janeiro
Referees: Pietro Reverberi (ITA), Juan M. Rossini (URU)

27 October
18:00

Philippines	43–56	United States
Scoring by half: 22–25, 21–31
Pts: Mumar 14		Pts: Minter 15

Ginásio do Maracanãzinho, Rio de Janeiro
Referees: Eduardo Airaldi (PER), Helio Louzada (BRA)

28 October

Uruguay	66–67	Canada
Scoring by half: 29–35, 37–32
Pts: Moglia 31		Pts: Ridd 14

Ginásio do Maracanãzinho, Rio de Janeiro
Referees: Alberto Pedro (PAR), Orlando Tabuso (BRA)

28 October

Israel	46–68	Brazil
Scoring by half: 20–31, 26–37
Pts: Erez 13		Pts: Pasos 15

Ginásio do Maracanãzinho, Rio de Janeiro
Referees: Pietro Reverberi (ITA), Angelo Benvenuto (CHI)

28 October

France	49–70	United States
Scoring by half: 21–32, 28–38
Pts: Haudegand 13		Pts: Minter 15

Ginásio do Maracanãzinho, Rio de Janeiro
Referees: Eduardo Airaldi (PER), Noli Coutinho (BRA)

29 October
19:00

Formosa	38–48	Philippines
Scoring by half: 21–21, 17–27
Pts: Wang Y.J. 12		Pts: Flores 12

Ginásio do Maracanãzinho, Rio de Janeiro
Referees: Renato Righetto (BRA), Juan M. Rossini (URU)

29 October

Canada	67–82	Brazil
Scoring by half: 22–43, 45–39
Pts: Gresham 19		Pts: Bonfietti 15

Ginásio do Maracanãzinho, Rio de Janeiro
Referees: Earl Schlup (USA), Angelo Benvenuto (CHI)

29 October
20:30

Uruguay	59–64	United States
Scoring by half: 26–30, 33–34
Pts: Lara 23		Pts: Born 15

Ginásio do Maracanãzinho, Rio de Janeiro
Referees: Pietro Reverberi (ITA), Helio Louzada (BRA)

30 October

Israel	56–90	Philippines
Scoring by half: 30–37, 26–53
Pts: Schneor 14		Pts: Loyzaga, Saldaña 20

Ginásio do Maracanãzinho, Rio de Janeiro
Referees: Earl Schlup (USA), Aladino Astuto (BRA)

30 October

France	58–48	Formosa
Scoring by half: 27–22, 31–26
Pts: Beugnot 19		Pts: Wang Y.J. 17

Ginásio do Maracanãzinho, Rio de Janeiro
Referees: Pietro Reverberi (ITA), Angelo Benvenuto (CHI)

30 October

Canada	50–84	United States
Scoring by half: 30–47, 20–37
Pts: Delkers 18		Pts: Born 17

Ginásio do Maracanãzinho, Rio de Janeiro
Referees: Eduardo Airaldi (PER), Alberto Pedro (PAR)

31 October

Brazil	57–41	Philippines
Scoring by half: 35–23, 22–18
Pts: de Almeida 15		Pts: Loyzaga 15

Ginásio do Maracanãzinho, Rio de Janeiro
Referees: Alberto Pedro (PAR), Juan M. Rossini (URU)

31 October

Uruguay	67–62	Formosa
Scoring by half: 28–33, 39–29
Pts: Moglia 27		Pts: Wang Y.J. 18

Ginásio do Maracanãzinho, Rio de Janeiro
Referees: Renato Righetto (BRA), Angelo Benvenuto (CHI)

31 October
18:30

Israel	48–45 (OT)	France
Scoring by half: 21–17, 22–26 Overtime: 5–2
Pts: Schneor 15		Pts: Dessemme 11

Ginásio do Maracanãzinho, Rio de Janeiro
Referees: Earl Schlup (USA), Helio Louzada (BRA)

1 November
19:30

Canada	76–83	Philippines
Scoring by half: 35–41, 41–42
Pts: Ridd 37		Pts: Mumar 24

Ginásio do Maracanãzinho, Rio de Janeiro
Referees: Earl Schlup (USA), Orlando Tabuso (BRA)

1 November

United States	72–28	Formosa
Scoring by half: 31–11, 41–17
Pts: Born 14		Pts: Ling J.H. 7

Ginásio do Maracanãzinho, Rio de Janeiro
Referees: Eduardo Airaldi (PER), Juan M. Rossini (URU)

1 November

Brazil	49–36	France
Scoring by half: 25–14, 24–22
Pts: Bonfietti 13		Pts: Haudegand 9

Ginásio do Maracanãzinho, Rio de Janeiro
Referees: Pietro Reverberi (ITA), Angelo Benvenuto (CHI)

3 November

Uruguay	73–69	Israel
Scoring by half: 32–31, 41–38
Pts: Lombardo 22		Pts: Cohen 21

Ginásio do Maracanãzinho, Rio de Janeiro
Referees: Aladino Astuto (BRA), Pietro Reverberi (ITA)

3 November

Canada	61–74	Formosa
Scoring by half: 29–29, 32–45
Pts: Ridd 26		Pts: Tong S.F. 18

Ginásio do Maracanãzinho, Rio de Janeiro
Referees: Angelo Benvenuto (CHI), Orlando Tabuso (BRA)

3 November

Philippines	66–60	France
Scoring by half: 25–23, 41–37
Pts: Loyzaga 19		Pts: Haudegand 11

Ginásio do Maracanãzinho, Rio de Janeiro
Referees: Eduardo Airaldi (PER), Noli Coutinho (BRA)

4 November
19:00

United States	74–30	Israel
Scoring by half: 36–20, 38–10
Pts: Johnson 13		Pts: Schneor 6

Ginásio do Maracanãzinho, Rio de Janeiro
Referees: Angelo Benvenuto (CHI), Alberto Pedro (PAR)

4 November

Brazil	60–45	Uruguay
Scoring by half: 24–23, 36–22
Pts: Pasos 18		Pts: Moglia 18

Ginásio do Maracanãzinho, Rio de Janeiro
Referees: Pietro Reverberi (ITA), Eduardo Airaldi (PER)

4 November

Canada	62–66	France
Scoring by half: 32–27, 30–39
Pts: Ridd 22		Pts: Antoine 14

Ginásio do Maracanãzinho, Rio de Janeiro
Referees: Earl Schlup (USA), Aladino Astuto (BRA)

5 November

Formosa	51–38	Israel
Scoring by half: 27–12, 24–26
Pts: Ling J.H. 12		Pts: Ofri 11

Ginásio do Maracanãzinho, Rio de Janeiro
Referees: Pietro Reverberi (ITA), Helio Louzada (BRA)

5 November

Philippines	67–63	Uruguay
Scoring by half: 32–32, 35–31
Pts: Loyzaga 31		Pts: Lombardo 14

Ginásio do Maracanãzinho, Rio de Janeiro
Referees: Aladino Astuto (BRA), Angelo Benvenuto (CHI)

5 November

United States	62–41	Brazil
Scoring by half: 35–19, 27–22
Pts: Edward 14		Pts: Pasos 12

Ginásio do Maracanãzinho, Rio de Janeiro
Referees: Eduardo Airaldi (PER), Alberto Pedro (PAR)

== Awards ==
1954 World Championship winner

United States
First title

Most Valuable Player
(United States) Kirby Minter

== Top scorers ==
Name	Country	Games	Total points	Average points
Oscar Moglia	Uruguay	9	168	18.7
Carl Ridd	Canada	9	164	18.2
Carlos Loyzaga	Philippines	9	148	16.4
Jean-Paul Beugnot	France	8	96	12.0
Kirby Minter	United States	9	100	11.1
Amaury Pasos	Brazil	9	100	11.1
Doug Gresham	Canada	9	98	10.8
Angelo Bonfietti	Brazil	9	97	10.7
Avraham Schneor	Israel	9	97	10.7
Wlamir Marques	Brazil	9	95	10.5

== All-tournament team ==
Name	Country
Carlos Loyzaga	Philippines
Kirby Minter	United States
Oscar Moglia	Uruguay
Zenny de Azevedo ("Algodão")	Brazil
Wlamir Marques	Brazil

== Final standings ==
Rank	Team	Record
1st place, gold medalist(s)	United States	9–0
2nd place, silver medalist(s)	Brazil	8–1
3rd place, bronze medalist(s)	Philippines	6–3
4	France	4–5
5	Formosa	3–6
6	Uruguay	4–5
7	Canada	3–6
8	Israel	2–7
9	Paraguay	3–2
10	Chile	3–2
11	Yugoslavia	1–4
12	Peru	0–5

- source:FIBA
