= 1970 FIBA World Championship =

1970 edition of the FIBA World Championship

FIBA Svjetsko prvenstvo u košarci 1970. FIBA Свјетско првенство у кошарци 1970
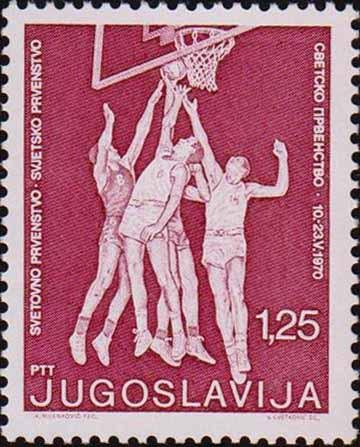
- Yugoslav stamp dedicated to the 1970 FIBA World Championship

Tournament details
- Host country: Yugoslavia
- Dates: 10–24 May
- Officially opened by: Josip Broz Tito
- Teams: 13 (from 5 confederations)
- Venues: 5 (in 5 host cities)

Final positions
- Champions: Yugoslavia (1st title)
- Runners-up: Brazil
- Third place: Soviet Union
- Fourth place: Italy

Tournament statistics
- Games played: 54
- MVP: (Soviet Union) Sergei Belov
- Top scorer: (South Korea) Shin Dong-Pa (32.6 points per game)

The 1970 FIBA World Championship was the 6th FIBA World Championship, the international basketball world championship for men's national teams. It was hosted by Yugoslavia in Sarajevo, Split, Karlovac, Skopje and Ljubljana, from 10 to 24 May 1970. It was the first FIBA World Championship hosted outside of South America.

== Competing nations ==
Event	Date	Location	Berths	Qualified
host nation			1	(Socialist Federal Republic of Yugoslavia)
1968 Summer Olympics	13-25 October 1968	Mexico City	1	United States
EuroBasket 1969	27 September–5 October 1969	(Italy) Caserta/Naples	2	Soviet Union; Czechoslovakia
South American Basketball Championship 1969	16-26 March 1969	(Uruguay) Montevideo	2	Brazil; Uruguay
Centrobasket 1969	29 October-7 November 1969	(Cuba) Havana	2	Cuba; Panama
1969 ABC Championship	18-29 November 1969	(Thailand) Bangkok	1	South Korea
FIBA Africa Championship 1970	9-15 March 1970	(Egypt) Cairo	1	United Arab Republic
Wild cards			3	Canada; Australia; Italy

Group A	Group B	Group C
Australia; Cuba; Czechoslovakia; United States	Brazil; Canada; Italy; South Korea	Panama; Soviet Union; United Arab Republic; Uruguay
Yugoslavia – advanced automatically to the final round as host

== Venues ==
Group A	Group B	Group C	Classification round	Final round
Sarajevo	Karlovac	Split	Skopje	Ljubljana
Dvorana Skenderija	Sportska Dvorana Mladost	Mala dvorana Gripe	Sala Gradski Park	Hala Tivoli
Capacity: 5,500	Capacity: 4,000	Capacity: 3,500	Capacity: 1,400	Capacity: 7,000

== Preliminary round ==
=== Group A ===
Pos	Team	Pld	W	L	PF	PA	PD	Pts	Qualification
1	United States	3	3	0	272	201	+71	6	Final round
2	Czechoslovakia	3	2	1	262	249	+13	5	Final round
3	Cuba	3	1	2	205	209	−4	4	Classification round
4	Australia	3	0	3	185	265	−80	3	Classification round

Source: FIBA archive
Rules for classification: 1) points; 2) head-to-head points; 3) head-to-head goal average; 4) head-to-head number of points scored.

10 May

Australia	70–94	Czechoslovakia
Scoring by half: 37-50, 33-44

Dvorana Skenderija, Sarajevo

10 May

United States	74–53	Cuba
Scoring by half: 40-27, 34-26

Dvorana Skenderija, Sarajevo

12 May

Cuba	80–82	Czechoslovakia
Scoring by half: 39-35, 41-47

Dvorana Skenderija, Sarajevo

12 May

United States	99–62	Australia
Scoring by half: 44-30, 55-32

Dvorana Skenderija, Sarajevo

13 May

Cuba	72–53	Australia
Scoring by half: 34-24, 38-29

Dvorana Skenderija, Sarajevo

13 May

United States	99–86	Czechoslovakia
Scoring by half: 50-35, 49-51

Dvorana Skenderija, Sarajevo

=== Group B ===
Pos	Team	Pld	W	L	PF	PA	PD	Pts	Qualification
1	Brazil	3	3	0	288	229	+59	6	Final round
2	Italy	3	2	1	254	229	+25	5	Final round
3	South Korea	3	1	2	240	247	−7	4	Classification round
4	Canada	3	0	3	216	293	−77	3	Classification round

Source: FIBA archive
Rules for classification: 1) points; 2) head-to-head points; 3) head-to-head goal average; 4) head-to-head number of points scored.

10 May

Brazil	82–77	South Korea
Scoring by half: 44-39, 38-38

Arena Gripe, Split

11 May

Canada	88–97	South Korea
Scoring by half: 50-49, 38-48

Arena Gripe, Split

11 May

Brazil	94–93 (2OT)	Italy
Scoring by half: 34-44, 42-32 Overtime: 10-10; 8-7

Arena Gripe, Split

12 May

Canada	69–84	Italy
Scoring by half: 35-45, 34-39

Arena Gripe, Split

13 May

Brazil	112–59	Canada
Scoring by half: 58-28, 54-31

Arena Gripe, Split

13 May

South Korea	66–77	Italy
Scoring by half: 31-36, 35-41

Arena Gripe, Split

=== Group C ===
Pos	Team	Pld	W	L	PF	PA	PD	Pts	Qualification
1	Soviet Union	3	3	0	302	161	+141	6	Final round
2	Uruguay	3	2	1	222	221	+1	5	Final round
3	Panama	3	1	2	236	266	−30	4	Classification round
4	United Arab Republic	3	0	3	206	318	−112	3	Classification round

Source: FIBA archive
Rules for classification: 1) points; 2) head-to-head points; 3) head-to-head goal average; 4) head-to-head number of points scored.

10 May

Uruguay	90–73	United Arab Republic
Scoring by half: 40-41, 50-32

Mladost Hall, Karlovac

11 May

United Arab Republic	77–107	Panama
Scoring by half: 31-43, 46-64

Mladost Hall, Karlovac

11 May

Soviet Union	71–53	Uruguay
Scoring by half: 32-30, 39-23

Mladost Hall, Karlovac

12 May

Panama	52–110	Soviet Union
Scoring by half: 23-42, 29-68

Mladost Hall, Karlovac

13 May

Uruguay	79–77	Panama
Scoring by half: 44-35, 35-42

Mladost Hall, Karlovac

13 May

Soviet Union	121–56	United Arab Republic
Scoring by half: 56-19, 65-37

Mladost Hall, Karlovac

== Classification round ==
Pos	Team	Pld	W	L	PF	PA	PD	Pts
8	Cuba	5	5	0	455	337	+118	10
9	Panama	5	3	2	425	408	+17	8 (Note: Head-to-head record: Panama 1–1 (1.01 GAvg), Canada 1–1 (1.00 GAvg), South Korea 1–1 (0.99 GAvg))
10	Canada	5	3	2	409	412	−3	8
11	South Korea	5	3	2	428	397	+31	8
12	Australia	5	1	4	394	433	−39	6
13	United Arab Republic	5	0	5	367	491	−124	5

Source: FIBA archive
Rules for classification: 1) points; 2) head-to-head points; 3) head-to-head goal average; 4) head-to-head number of points scored.
Notes:

16 May

Canada	65–98	Cuba
Scoring by half: 22-49, 43-49

Skopje Hall, Skopje

17 May

Australia	95–81	United Arab Republic
Scoring by half: 53-30, 42-51

Skopje Hall, Skopje

17 May

South Korea	88–91 (OT)	Panama
Scoring by half: 34-39, 50-45 Overtime: 4-7

Skopje Hall, Skopje

19 May

Panama	90–83	Australia
Scoring by half: 38-39, 52-44

Skopje Hall, Skopje

19 May

United Arab Republic	64–103	Cuba
Scoring by half: 35-47, 29-56

Skopje Hall, Skopje

19 May

South Korea	79–77	Canada
Scoring by half: 45-45, 34-32

Skopje Hall, Skopje

20 May

United Arab Republic	73–93	South Korea
Scoring by half: 36-47, 37-46

Skopje Hall, Skopje

20 May

Australia	61–90	Cuba
Scoring by half: 32-43, 29-47

Skopje Hall, Skopje

20 May

Panama	79–81	Canada
Scoring by half: 37-37, 42-44

Skopje Hall, Skopje

22 May

Panama	94–69	United Arab Republic
Scoring by half: 50-33, 44-36

Skopje Hall, Skopje

22 May

Canada	80–76	Australia
Scoring by half: 38-42, 42-34

Skopje Hall, Skopje

22 May

South Korea	76–77	Cuba
Scoring by half: 40-39, 36-38

Skopje Hall, Skopje

23 May

Australia	79–92	South Korea
Scoring by half: 41-49, 38-43

Skopje Hall, Skopje

23 May

Canada	106–80	United Arab Republic
Scoring by half: 54-45, 52-35

Skopje Hall, Skopje

23 May

Cuba	87–71	Panama
Scoring by half: 42-35, 45-36

Skopje Hall, Skopje

== Final round ==
Pos	Team	Pld	W	L	PF	PA	PD	Pts
1	Yugoslavia (C, H)	6	5	1	445	397	+48	11
2	Brazil	6	4	2	416	421	−5	10 (Note: Head-to-head record: Brazil 1–0 Soviet Union)
3	Soviet Union	6	4	2	478	386	+92	10
4	Italy	6	3	3	411	403	+8	9 (Note: Head-to-head record: Italy 1–0 United States)
5	United States	6	3	3	431	376	+55	9
6	Czechoslovakia	6	2	4	440	509	−69	8
7	Uruguay	6	0	6	342	471	−129	6

Source: FIBA archive
Rules for classification: 1) points; 2) head-to-head points; 3) head-to-head goal average; 4) head-to-head number of points scored.
(C) Champions; (H) Hosts
Notes:

16 May

United States	88–60	Czechoslovakia
Scoring by half: 39-24, 49-36

Tivoli Hall, Ljubljana

16 May

Yugoslavia	66–63	Italy
Scoring by half: 28-24, 38-39

Tivoli Hall, Ljubljana

16 May

Soviet Union	64–66	Brazil
Scoring by half: 38-27, 26-39

Tivoli Hall, Ljubljana

17 May

Soviet Union	98–72	Czechoslovakia
Scoring by half: 51-34, 47-38

Tivoli Hall, Ljubljana

17 May

Brazil	69–59	Italy
Scoring by half: 29-29, 40-30

Tivoli Hall, Ljubljana

17 May

United States	76–39	Uruguay
Scoring by half: 33-17, 43-22

Tivoli Hall, Ljubljana

18 May

Soviet Union	95–43	Uruguay
Scoring by half: 50-32, 45-11

Tivoli Hall, Ljubljana

18 May

Czechoslovakia	77–89	Italy
Scoring by half: 41-43, 36-46

Tivoli Hall, Ljubljana

18 May

Brazil	55–80	Yugoslavia
Scoring by half: 26-40, 29-40

Tivoli Hall, Ljubljana

20 May

Italy	76–65	Uruguay
Scoring by half: 48-27, 28-38

Tivoli Hall, Ljubljana

20 May

Soviet Union	72–75	United States
Scoring by half: 44-44, 28-31

Tivoli Hall, Ljubljana

20 May

Czechoslovakia	84–94	Yugoslavia
Scoring by half: 40-42, 44-52

Tivoli Hall, Ljubljana

21 May

Czechoslovakia	72–71	Brazil
Scoring by half: 34-40, 38-31

Tivoli Hall, Ljubljana

21 May

Italy	66–64	United States
Scoring by half: 32-33, 34-31

Tivoli Hall, Ljubljana

21 May

Uruguay	45–63	Yugoslavia
Scoring by half: 26-37, 19-26

Tivoli Hall, Ljubljana

23 May

Uruguay	81–86	Brazil
Scoring by half: 35-43, 46-43

Tivoli Hall, Ljubljana

23 May

Italy	58–62	Soviet Union
Scoring by half: 22-28, 36-34

Tivoli Hall, Ljubljana

23 May

Yugoslavia	70–63	United States
Scoring by half: 35-32, 35-31

Tivoli Hall, Ljubljana

24 May

Uruguay	69–75	Czechoslovakia
Scoring by half: 36-35, 33-40

Tivoli Hall, Ljubljana

24 May

United States	65–69	Brazil
Scoring by half: 34-35, 31-34

Tivoli Hall, Ljubljana

24 May

Yugoslavia	72–87	Soviet Union
Scoring by half: 38-49, 34-38

Tivoli Hall, Ljubljana

== Final standings ==
Rank	Team	Record
1st place, gold medalist(s)	Yugoslavia	5–1
2nd place, silver medalist(s)	Brazil	7–2
3rd place, bronze medalist(s)	Soviet Union	7–2
4	Italy	5–4
5	United States	6–3
6	Czechoslovakia	4–5
7	Uruguay	2–7
8	Cuba	6–2
9	Panama	4–4
10	Canada	3–5
11	South Korea	4–4
12	Australia	1–7
13	United Arab Republic	0–8

1970 World Championship winner

Yugoslavia
First title

Most Valuable Player
(Soviet Union) Sergei Belov

Team Roster

Ratomir Tvrdić, Ljubodrag Simonović, Vinko Jelovac, Trajko Rajković, Aljoša Žorga, Dragan Kapičić, Ivo Daneu, Krešimir Ćosić, Damir Šolman, Nikola Plećaš, Dragutin Čermak, and Petar Skansi. Head coach: Ranko Žeravica.

=== All-Tournament Team ===
- Krešimir Ćosić (Yugoslavia)
- Sergei Belov - (MVP) (Soviet Union)
- Modestas Paulauskas (Soviet Union)
- Ubiratan Pereira Maciel (Brazil)
- Kenny Washington (USA)

=== Top scorers (ppg) ===
1. Shin Dong-Pa (South Korea) 32.6
2. Omar Arrestia (Uruguay) 19.7
3. Pedro Rivas (Panama) 18.8
4. Davis Peralta (Panama) 18.8
5. Jiri Zidek Sr. (Czechoslovakia) 18.6
6. Pedro Chappe Garcia (Cuba) 17.9
7. Lee In-Pyo (South Korea) 17.8
8. Krešimir Ćosić (Yugoslavia) 17.3
9. Luiz Cláudio Menon (Brazil) 16.9
10. Bob Molinski (Canada) 16.8
