= Equestrian at the 1948 Summer Olympics – Individual jumping =

Individual jumping at the Games of the XIV Olympiad
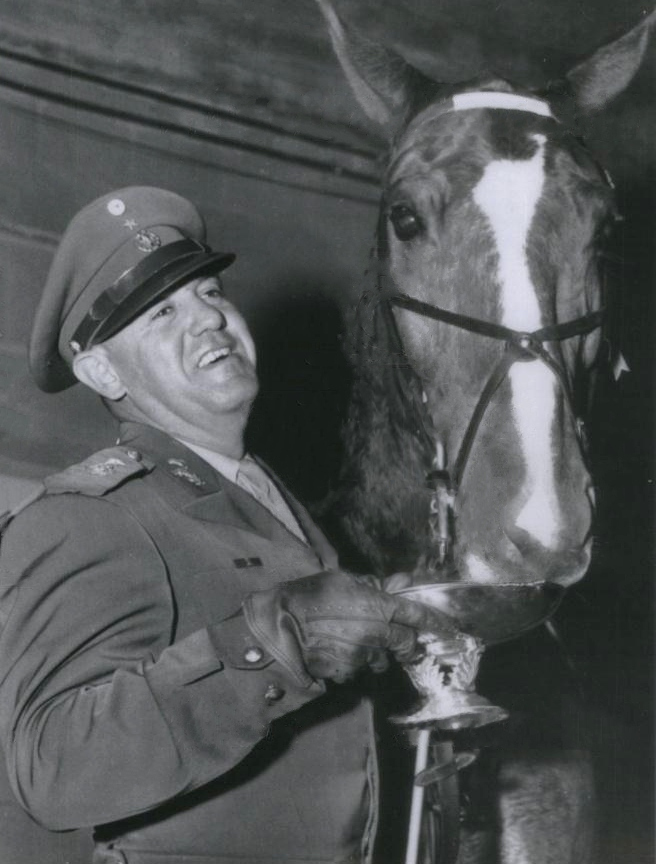
- Humberto Mariles (1956)
- Venue: Wembley Stadium
- Date: 14 August 1948
- Competitors: 44 from 15 nations
- Winning total: 6.25

Medalists
1st place, gold medalist(s)		Humberto Mariles; Mexico
2nd place, silver medalist(s)		Rubén Uriza; Mexico
3rd place, bronze medalist(s)		Jean-François d'Orgeix; France

The individual show jumping in equestrian at the 1948 Summer Olympics in London was held at the Wembley Stadium on 14 August. The competition consisted of a single round of jumping. In the case of a tie in points, a jump-off was arranged. The jump-off had no time limit, however, the time taken to complete the jump-off was used as a tie-breaker. The points from the individual competition were also used in the team competition. There were 44 competitors from 15 nations, with nations able to send up to three riders each. The event was won by Humberto Mariles of Mexico, with his teammate Rubén Uriza taking silver at the top of a three-way jump-off for second place. Mariles' win was Mexico's first victory in the event. Jean-François d'Orgeix of France earned that nation's first individual jumping medal since 1928 with his bronze.

== Background ==
This was the eighth appearance of the event, which had first been held at the 1900 Summer Olympics and has been held at every Summer Olympics at which equestrian sports have been featured (that is, excluding 1896, 1904, and 1908). It is the oldest event on the current programme, the only one that was held in 1900.

None of the top 10 riders from the pre-war 1936 competition returned.

Brazil, Denmark, Finland, and Ireland each made their debut in the event. France and Sweden both competed for the seventh time, tied for the most of any nation; Sweden had missed only the inaugural 1900 competition, while France missed the individual jumping in 1932.

== Competition format ==
The team and individual jumping competitions used the same scores. A single round of jumping was held.

The jumping test featured 16 obstacles (19 total jumps) over 870 metres. Points were lost for faults (including elimination for the third refusal on the course) and for exceeding the time limit. Ties for medals were determined by jump-off; other ties were not broken. In the jump-off, there was no time limit but instead the time was used as a tie-breaker if pairs had the same number of faults.

== Schedule ==
All times are British Summer Time (UTC+1)

Date	Time	Round
Saturday, 14 August 1948	13:30	Final

== Results ==
Mariles was the last rider. Three riders had already finished with 8 faults apiece. Only two teams (Spain and Great Britain) had finished; with Mariles' teammates both having completed the course, he needed only finish the course to earn a team bronze. A score under 39 would earn team silver for Mexico; under 28.50, team gold. Those marks would turn out to be well more than Mariles needed; he had the best run of anyone with only 4 jumping penalties (knocking down the 15th jump) and an over-time penalty of 2.25, for a total of 6.25 penalties and the gold medal.

Rank	Rider	Horse	Nation	Penalties			Notes
Rank	Rider	Horse	Nation	Jump	Time	Total	Notes
1st place, gold medalist(s)	Humberto Mariles	Arete	Mexico	4	2.25	6.25	
2	Rubén Uriza	Harvey	Mexico	8	0	8	Silver jump-off
2	Jean-François d'Orgeix	Sucre de Pomme	France	8	0	8	Silver jump-off
2	Franklin Wing	Democrat	United States	8	0	8	Silver jump-off
5	Jaime García	Bizarro	Spain	12	0	12	
5	Eric Sörensen	Blatunga	Sweden	12	0	12	
7	Max Fresson	Decametre	France	16	0	16	
7	Harry Llewellyn	Foxhunter	Great Britain	16	0	16	
7	Harry Nicoll	Kilgeddin	Great Britain	16	0	16	
10	José Navarro Morenés	Quorum	Spain	20	0	20	
10	Alberto Valdés	Chihuahua	Mexico	20	0	20	
10	Francisco Pontes	Itaguai	Brazil	20	0	20	
13	Greger Lewenhaupt	Orkan	Sweden	19	1.75	20.75	
14	Dan Corry	Tramore Bay	Ireland	20	1.25	21.25	
15	Rafael Campos	Santa Fe	Argentina	24	0	24	
16	Marcelino Gavilán	Forajido	Spain	24	0.50	24.50	
17	Fred Ahern	Aherlow	Ireland	23	2.50	25.50	
18	Henrique Callado	Xerez	Portugal	23	3	26	
19	Arthur Carr	Monty	Great Britain	35	0	35	
20	Joachim Gruppelaar	Random Harvest	Netherlands	36	0	36	
21	John Russell	Air Mail	United States	25	13.25	38.25	
22	João Barrento	Alcoa	Portugal	32	10.50	42.50	
23	Tauno Rissanen	Viser	Finland	56	0	56	
—	Néstor Alvarado	Mineral	Argentina	Eliminated			
—	Pascual Pistarini	Canguro	Argentina	Eliminated			
—	Eloy de Menezes	Sabu	Brazil	Eliminated			
—	Ruben Ribeiro	Bon Soir	Brazil	Eliminated			
—	Otto Mønsted Acthon	Please	Denmark	Eliminated			
—	Jeppe Johannes Ladegaard-Mikkelsen	Atom	Denmark	Eliminated			
—	Torben Tryde	Attila	Denmark	Eliminated			
—	Veikko Vartiainen	Pontus	Finland	Eliminated			
—	Pierre de Maupeou d'Ableiges	Nankin	France	Eliminated			
—	Jan de Bruine	Romanichel	Netherlands	Eliminated			
—	Jaap Rijks	Master	Netherlands	Eliminated			
—	Jack Lewis	Lough Neagh	Ireland	Eliminated			
—	Alessandro, Count Bettoni Cazzago	Uranio II	Italy	Eliminated			
—	Gerardo Conforti	Furori	Italy	Eliminated			
—	Piero D'Inzeo	Briacone	Italy	Eliminated			
—	Hélder Martins	Optus	Portugal	Eliminated			
—	Karl-Åke Hultberg	Ismed	Sweden	Eliminated			
—	Selim Çakir	Gitchluv	Turkey	Eliminated			
—	Kudret Kasar	Siyok	Turkey	Eliminated			
—	Eyüp Öncü	Yildiz	Turkey	Eliminated			
—	Hank Frierson	Rascal	United States	Eliminated			

Silver medal jump-off

Rank	Rider	Horse	Nation	Penalties	Time
2nd place, silver medalist(s)	Rubén Uriza	Harvey	Mexico	0	49.1
3rd place, bronze medalist(s)	Jean-François d'Orgeix	Sucre de Pomme	France	4	38.9
4	Franklin Wing	Democrat	United States	4	40.1
