= Equestrian at the 1948 Summer Olympics – Team jumping =

Equestrian at the Olympics

Team jumping at the Games of the XIV Olympiad
- Venue: Empire Stadium
- Date: 14 August 1948
- Competitors: 44 from 15 nations

Medalists
1st place, gold medalist(s)		Humberto Mariles; Rubén Uriza; Alberto Valdés	Mexico
2nd place, silver medalist(s)		Jaime García; José Navarro Morenés; Marcelino Gavilán	Spain
3rd place, bronze medalist(s)		Harry Llewellyn; Henry Nicoll; Arthur Carr	Great Britain

The team jumping in equestrian at the 1948 Olympic Games in London was held at the Empire Stadium on 14 August. The competition consisted of a single round of jumping. In the case of a tie in points, a jump-off was arranged. The jump-off had no time limit, however, the time taken to complete the jump-off was used as a tie-breaker. The points from the individual competition were also used in the team competition.

== Results ==
Rank	Name	Individual penalties	Team total penalties
1st place, gold medalist(s)	Mexico; Humberto Mariles; Rubén Uriza; Alberto Valdés	6.25; 8; 20	34.25
2nd place, silver medalist(s)	Spain; Jaime García; José Navarro Morenés; Marcelino Gavilán	12; 20; 24.50	56.50
3rd place, bronze medalist(s)	Great Britain; Harry Llewellyn; Henry Nicoll; Arthur Carr	16; 16; 35	67.00
-	France; Jean-François d'Orgeix; Max Fresson; Pierre de Maupeou d'Ableiges	8; 16; Eliminated	DNF
-	Sweden; Eric Sörensen; Greg Lewenhaupt; Karl-Åke Hultberg	12; 20.75; Eliminated	DNF
-	United States; Franklin Wing; John Russell; Andrew Fierson	8; 38.25; Eliminated	DNF
-	Ireland; Dan Corry; Fred Ahern; Jack Lewis	21.25; 25.50; Eliminated	DNF
-	Portugal; Henrique Callado; João Barrento; Hélder Martins	26; 42.50; Eliminated	DNF
-	Brazil; Francisco Pontes; Eloy de Menezes; Ruben Ribeiro	20; Eliminated; Eliminated	DNF
-	Argentina; Rafael Campos; Néstor Alvarado; Pascual Pistarini	24; Eliminated; Eliminated	DNF
-	Netherlands; Joachim Gruppelaar; Jan de Bruine; Jaap Rijks	36; Eliminated; Eliminated	DNF
-	Denmark; Otto Mønsted Acthon; Jeppe Johannes Ladegaard-Mikkelsen; Torben Tryde	Eliminated; Eliminated; Eliminated	DNF
-	Italy; Alessandro, Count Bettoni Cazzago; Gerardo Conforti; Piero D'Inzeo	Eliminated; Eliminated; Eliminated	DNF
-	Turkey; Selim Çakir; Kudret Kasar; Eyüp Öncü	Eliminated; Eliminated; Eliminated	DNF
