= Mexico at the 1948 Summer Olympics =

- IOC code: MEX
- NOC: Mexican Olympic Committee

in London
- Competitors: 88 (81 men and 7 women) in 14 sports
- Flag bearer: Francisco Bustamente
- Medals Ranked 17th: Gold 2 Silver 1 Bronze 2 Total 5

Summer Olympics appearances (overview)
- 1900; 1904–1920; 1924; 1928; 1932; 1936; 1948; 1952; 1956; 1960; 1964; 1968; 1972; 1976; 1980; 1984; 1988; 1992; 1996; 2000; 2004; 2008; 2012; 2016; 2020; 2024; 2028

Mexico competed at the 1948 Summer Olympics in London, England. 88 competitors, 81 men and 7 women, took part in 57 events in 14 sports.

== Medalists ==
Medal	Name	Sport	Event	Date
Gold	Humberto Mariles	Equestrian	Jumping Individual	14 August
Gold	Humberto Mariles; Alberto Valdés; Rubén Uriza	Equestrian	Jumping Team	14 August
Silver	Rubén Uriza	Equestrian	Jumping Individual	4 August
Bronze	Joaquín Capilla	Diving	Men's platform	5 August
Bronze	Raúl Campero; Humberto Mariles; Joaquín Solano	Equestrian	Team eventing	13 August

== Athletics ==
Key

- Note–Ranks given for track events are within the athlete's heat only
- Q = Qualified for the next round
- q = Qualified for the next round as a fastest loser or, in field events, by position without achieving the qualifying target
- NR = National record
- N/A = Round not applicable for the event
- Bye = Athlete not required to compete in round

Track & road events

Athlete	Event	Heat		Quarterfinal		Semifinal		Final	
Athlete	Event	Result	Rank	Result	Rank	Result	Rank	Result	Rank
Gonzalo Rodríguez	100 m	11.97	6	Did not advance					
Gonzalo Rodríguez	200 m	Unknown	5	Did not advance					
Carlos Monges	400 m	50.9	3	Did not advance					
Martín Alarcón	5000 m	—N/a				Unknown	8	Did not advance	

Field events

Athlete	Event	Qualification		Final	
Athlete	Event	Distance	Position	Distance	Position
Jorge Aguirre	Men's high jump	Did not start		Did not advance	
Jorge Aguirre	Men's long jump	5.91	20	Did not advance	
Jorge Aguirre	Men's triple jump	Unknown	26	Did not advance	
Francisco González	Men's hammer throw	39.50	24	Did not advance	

== Basketball ==
Summary

Team	Event	Group stage					Quarterfinal	Semifinal	Final / BM	
Team	Event	Opposition Score	Opposition Score	Opposition Score	Opposition Score	Rank	Opposition Score	Opposition Score	Opposition Score	Rank
Mexico men's	Men's tournament	Cuba; W 39–31	Ireland; W 71–9	France; W 56-42	Iran; W 68-27	1 Q	South Korea; W 43–32	United States; L 71–40	Brazil; L 52–47	4

Team roster

Mexico men's national basketball team roster
Players
Coaches

Pos.	No.	Name	Age – Date of birth	Height	Club	Ctr.
	3	Jorge Gudiño	28 – 2 June 1920
	4	Francisco Galindo	–
	5	Emilio López	24 – 23 August 1923
	9	Angel Acuña Lizaña	29 – 11 February 1919
	12	Alberto Bienvenú	–
	13	Fernando Rojas	24 – 2 August 1923
	14	José Rojas	24 – 9 November 1923
	19	Jorge Cardiel	24 – 23 April 1924
	21	Isaac Alfaro	–
	22	Ignacio Romo Porchas	24 – 17 July 1924
	29	José Cabrera	27 – 22 January 1921
	33	Héctor Guerrero	21 – 24 November 1926
	55	Rodolfo Díaz	30 – 7 May 1918
	77	Josué Santos	32 – 1 July 1916

Head coach

- (Mexico) Agustín García Arreola

Legend

- Club – describes last
  club before the competition
- Age – describes age
  on 30 July 1948

Group play

Pos	Team	Pld	W	L	PF	PA	PD	Pts	Qualification
1	Mexico	4	4	0	234	109	+125	8	Quarterfinals
2	France	4	3	1	214	131	+83	7	Quarterfinals
3	Cuba	4	2	2	213	131	+82	6	9–16th classification
4	Iran	4	1	3	136	215	−79	5	9–16th classification
5	Ireland	4	0	4	70	281	−211	4	17th–21st classification

Updated to match(es) played on unknown. Source:
Rules for classification: 1) classification points; 2) head-to-head results; 3) head-to-head game points difference; 4) head-to-head number of game points scored.

1 August 1948

Mexico	39–31	Cuba
Scoring by half: 23–11, 16–20
Pts: Santos 16		Pts: Aguero 9

Harringay Arena
Referees: Abdel Azim Ashry (EGY), Vittorio Ugolini (ITA)

2 August 1948

Mexico	71–9	Ireland
Scoring by half: 34–4, 37–5
Pts: Porchas 23		Pts: Creha 3

Harringay Arena
Referees: Ernest Chuard (SUI), Jan Osuský (TCH)

3 August 1948

Mexico	56–42	France
Scoring by half: 30–20, 26–22
Pts: Santos 16		Pts: Quénin 10

Harringay Arena
Referees: Oddone Gagliardi (ITA), Jan Osuský (TCH)

5 August 1948

Mexico	68–27	Iran
Scoring by half: 37–13, 31–14
Pts: Guerrero 14		Pts: Soroudi 10

Harringay Arena
Referees: François Van der Perren (BEL), Oddone Gagliardi (ITA)

Quarterfinals

9 August 1948

Mexico	43–32	South Korea
Scoring by half: 24–16, 19–16
Pts: Santos 18		Pts: Byeong-seok 9

Harringay Arena
Referees: François Van der Perren (BEL), Vittorio Ugolini (ITA)

Semifinals

12 August 1948

United States	71–40	Mexico
Scoring by half: 30–14, 41–26
Pts: Groza 19		Pts: Lizaña 9

Harringay Arena
Referees: Abdel Azim Ashry (EGY), Vittorio Ugolini (ITA)

Bronze medal game

12 August 1948

Brazil	52–47	Mexico
Scoring by half: 17–25, 35–22
Pts: Da Motta 25		Pts: Santos 16

Harringay Arena

== Boxing ==
Athlete	Event	Round of 32	Round of 16	Quarterfinals	Semifinals	Final	
Athlete	Event	Opposition Result	Opposition Result	Opposition Result	Opposition Result	Opposition Result	Rank
Antonio Luna	Flyweight	Did not start	Did not advance				
Edel Ojeda	Bantamweight	Proffitt (GBR); W	Vicente (ESP); L	Did not advance			9
Conrado Castañon	Featherweight	Did not start	Did not advance				
Ángel Arriaga	Lightweight	Did not start	Did not advance				
Lucio Moreno	Welterweight	Did not start	Did not advance				

== Cycling ==
=== Road ===
Athlete	Event	Time	Rank
Placido Herrera	Men's individual road race	Did not finish	
Francisco Rodríguez	Men's individual road race	Did not finish	
Gabino Rodríguez	Men's individual road race	Did not finish	
Manuel Solis	Men's individual road race	Did not finish	
Placido Herrera; Francisco Rodríguez; Gabino Rodríguez; Manuel Solis	Men's team road race	Did not finish	
Adolfo Romero	1000 m time trial	1:22.7	18

=== Track ===
Sprint

Athlete	Event	Round 1	Repechage 1	Round 2	Quarterfinals	Semifinals	Final	
Athlete	Event	Opposition time speed (km/h)	Opposition time speed (km/h)	Opposition time speed (km/h)	Opposition time speed (km/h)	Opposition time speed (km/h)	Opposition time speed (km/h)	Rank
Adolfo Romero	Men's sprint	Welt (AUT); L 17.2	Lacourse (CAN); L 13.7	Did not advance				

== Diving ==
Men

Athlete	Event	Final	
Athlete	Event	Points	Rank
Joaquín Capilla	3 m springboard	141.79	4
Diego Mariscal	3 m springboard	107.78	17
Joaquín Capilla	10 m platform	113.52	3rd place, bronze medalist(s)
Diego Mariscal	10 m platform	95.14	13
Gustavo Somohano	10 m platform	91.98	14

Women

Athlete	Event	Final	
Athlete	Event	Points	Rank
Ibone Belausteguigoitia	3 m springboard	58.18	16
Rosa Gutiérrez	10 m platform	41.88	14

== Equestrian ==
=== Dressage ===
Athlete	Horse	Event	Score	Rank
Gabriel Gracida	Kamcia	Individual	248.5	18

=== Eventing ===
Athlete	Horse	Event	Dressage		Cross-country			Jumping		Total	
Athlete	Horse	Event	Points	Rank	Points	Total	Rank	Points	Rank	Points	Rank
Raúl Campero	Tarahumara	Individual	-128.00	24	39	-89.00	31	31.50	31	-120.50	22
Humberto Mariles	Parral	Individual	-134.00	28	75	-59.00	14	2.75	14	-61.75	12
Joaquín Solano	Malinche	Individual	-149.00	36	36	-113.00	33	10	18	-123.00	23
Raúl Campero; Humberto Mariles; Joaquín Solano	Tarahumara; Parral; Malinche	Team	-411.00	9	150	-261.00	5	-44.25	4	-305.25	3rd place, bronze medalist(s)

=== Jumping ===
Athlete	Horse	Event	Penalties	Rank
Humberto Mariles	Arete	Individual	6.25	1st place, gold medalist(s)
Rubén Uriza	Harvey	Individual	8	2nd place, silver medalist(s)
Alberto Valdés	Chihuahua	Individual	20	10
Humberto Mariles; Rubén Uriza; Alberto Valdés	Arete; Harvey; Chihuahua	Team	34.25	1st place, gold medalist(s)

== Fencing ==
Men

Athlete	Event	Round 1			Quarterfinals			Semifinals			Final		
Athlete	Event	MW	ML	Rank	MW	ML	Rank	MW	ML	Rank	MW	ML	Rank
Fidel Luña	Men's foil	Did not start			Did not advance								
Alfredo Grisi	Men's foil	0	5	6	Did not advance								
Benito Ramos	Men's foil	Did not start			Did not advance								
Antonio Haro	Men's épée	3	3	2 Q	1	5	7	Did not advance					
Emilio Meraz	Men's épée	2	4	5	Did not advance								
Francisco Valero	Men's épée	0	7	8	Did not advance								
Antonio Haro; Emilio Meraz; Benito Ramos; Francisco Valero	Men's team épée	0	2	3	Did not advance								
Antonio Haro	Men's sabre	4	2	2 Q	3	4	4 Q	4	3	4 Q	1	6	8
Fidel Luña	Men's sabre	0	4	7	Did not advance								
Benito Ramos	Men's sabre	1	3	4	Did not advance								
Francisco Valero	Men's sabre	Did not start			Did not advance								
Antonio Haro; Fidel Luña; Benito Ramos; Francisco Valero	Men's team sabre	0	2	3	Did not advance								

Women

Athlete	Event	Round 1			Quarterfinals			Semifinals			Final		
Athlete	Event	MW	ML	Rank	MW	ML	Rank	MW	ML	Rank	MW	ML	Rank
Nadia Boudesoque	Women's foil	2	4	6	Did not advance								
Enriqueta Mayora	Women's foil	2	3	5	Did not advance								
Emma Ruíz	Women's foil	0	6	7	Did not advance								

== Football ==
Summary

Key:

- A.E.T – After extra time.

Team	Event	Prelim.	Round 16	Quarterfinal	Semifinal	Final / BM	
Team	Event	Opposition Score	Opposition Score	Opposition Score	Opposition Score	Opposition Score	Rank
Mexico men's	Men's tournament	Bye	South Korea; L 3–5	Did not advance			

Team roster

Head coach: Abel Ramírez

Pos.	Player	DoB	Age	Caps	Club	Tournament games	Tournament goals	Minutes played	Sub off	Sub on	Cards yellow/red
DF	Raúl Cárdenas	Oct 30, 1928	19	?	(Mexico) Real Club España	8 o1	1	90	-	-	-
MF	Alberto Cordoba	May 13, 1925	23	?	(Mexico) Estrella	1	0	90	-	-	-
MF	Fernando Figueroa	Jul 2, 1925	23	?	(Mexico) SUTAJ	1	1	90	-	-	-
FW	Eduardo Garduño	Oct 2, 1928	19	?	(Mexico) Club América	1	0	90	-	-	-
FW	José Mercado Luna	Aug 6, 1928	19	?	(Mexico) Occidente	1	0	90	-	-	-
GK	Francisco Quintero Nava	Mar 8, 1923	25	?	(Mexico) Imperio	1	0	90	-	-	-
DF	Jorge Rodríguez Navarro			?	(Mexico) Club Atlas	1	0	90	-	-	-
DF	José Luis Rodríguez Peralta	Nov 5, 1922	25	?	(Mexico) CF Moctezuma	1	0	90	-	-	-
FW	Jorge Ruiz Aguilar	May 13, 1928	20	?	(Mexico) Atlas Tulancingo	1	1	90	-	-	-
FW	Mario Sánchez			?	(Mexico) Club América	1	0	90	-	-	-
DF	Carlos Thompson			?	(Mexico) Instituto Politécnico Nacional	1	0	90	-	-	-
	Stand-by players -
GK	Antonio Carbajal	Jun 7, 1929	19	?	(Mexico) Oviedo	0	0	0	-	-	-
FW	José Maria Cobián			?	(Mexico) Club América	0	0	0	-	-	-
MF	Julio Parrales Tapia	1922	25	?	(Mexico) Instituto Politécnico Nacional	0	0	0	-	-	-
MF	Ruben Ruiz Aguilar			?	(Mexico) Atlas Tulancingo	0	0	0	-	-	-
MF	Julio Trujillo			?	(Mexico) Instituto Politécnico Nacional	0	0	0	-	-	-
MF	Fidel Villalobos			?	(Mexico) Imperio	0	0	0	-	-	-

Round of 16

2 August 1948
18:30

South Korea	5–3	Mexico
Choi Seong-gon 13'; Bae Jeong-ho 30'; Chung Kook-chin 63', 66'; Chung Nam-sik 87'	Report	Cárdenas 23'; Figueroa 85'; Ruiz 89'

Champion Hill, Dulwich
Attendance: 6,500
Referee: Leo Lemesic (Yugoslavia)

== Gymnastics ==
=== Artistic ===
Team

Athlete	Event	Final							
Athlete	Event	Apparatus						Total	Rank
Athlete	Event	F	PH	R	PB	HB	V	Total	Rank
Jorge Castro	Team	20.0	11.0	14.5	14.5	17.0	26.9	103.9	—N/a
Rubén Lira	Team	17.0	14.0	13.2	12.25	17.0	25.5	98.95	—N/a
Dionisio Aguilar	Team	11.0	14.0	11.4	17.0	8.0	20.4	81.8	—N/a
Everardo Rios	Team	12.0	4.7	11.0	9.5	6.0	12.0	55.2	—N/a
Nicanor Villarreal	Team	4.0							—N/a
Total	Team	—N/a						343.85	16

Individual

Apparatus and all-around events received separate scores.

Athlete	Event	Final							
Athlete	Event	Apparatus						Total	Rank
Athlete	Event	F	PH	R	PB	HB	V	Total	Rank
Dionisio Aguilar	All-around	11.0	14.0	11.4	17.0	8.0	20.4	55.2	120
Jorge Castro	All-around	20.0	11.0	14.5	14.5	17.0	26.9	103.9	116
Rubén Lira	All-around	17.0	14.0	13.2	12.25	17.0	25.5	98.95	117
Everardo Rios	All-around	12.0	4.7	11.0	9.5	6.0	12.0	55.2	120
Nicanor Villarreal	All-around	4.0							122
Dionisio Aguilar	Floor	11.0	—N/a						120
Jorge Castro	Floor	20.0	—N/a						114
Rubén Lira	Floor	17.0	—N/a						117
Everardo Rios	Floor	12.0	—N/a						119
Nicanor Villarreal	Floor	4.0	—N/a						121
Dionisio Aguilar	Pommel horse	—N/a	14.0	—N/a					113
Jorge Castro	Pommel horse	—N/a	11.0	—N/a					120
Rubén Lira	Pommel horse	—N/a	14.0	—N/a					113
Everardo Rios	Pommel horse	—N/a	4.7	—N/a					121
Dionisio Aguilar	Rings	—N/a		11.4	—N/a				119
Jorge Castro	Rings	—N/a		14.5	—N/a				116
Rubén Lira	Rings	—N/a		13.2	—N/a				118
Everardo Rios	Rings	—N/a		11.0	—N/a				120
Dionisio Aguilar	Parallel bars	—N/a			17.0	—N/a			115
Jorge Castro	Parallel bars	—N/a			14.5	—N/a			118
Rubén Lira	Parallel bars	—N/a			12.25	—N/a			119
Everardo Rios	Parallel bars	—N/a			9.5	—N/a			120
Dionisio Aguilar	Horizontal bar	—N/a				8.0	—N/a		119
Jorge Castro	Horizontal bar	—N/a				17.0	—N/a		108
Rubén Lira	Horizontal bar	—N/a				17.0	—N/a		108
Everardo Rios	Horizontal bar	—N/a				6.0	—N/a		120
Dionisio Aguilar	Floor	—N/a					20.4	—N/a	113
Jorge Castro	Floor	—N/a					26.9	—N/a	107
Rubén Lira	Floor	—N/a					25.5	—N/a	108
Everardo Rios	Floor	—N/a					12.0	—N/a	119

== Modern pentathlon ==
Athlete	Fencing (épée one touch)		Swimming (300 m freestyle)		Riding (cross-country)			Shooting (10 m air pistol)		Running (4000 m)		Total points	Final rank
Athlete	Results (Wins)	Rank	Time	Rank	Penalties	Time	Rank	Points	Rank	Time	Rank	Total points	Final rank
Ricardo García	12	=31	4:42.4	10	0	9:49.8	8	148	43	16:50.7	33	134	35
Alejandro Quiroz	15	40	5:26.2	27	39.5	11:18.3	29	186	16	16:31.7	27	130	33

== Shooting ==
Athlete	Event	Final	
Athlete	Event	Points	Rank
José Alanís	25 m rapid fire pistol	529	44
Francisco Bustamente	25 m rapid fire pistol	539	18
Ernesto Montemayor Sr.	25 m rapid fire pistol	550	14
Gilberto Martínez	30 metre rifle	1013	22
José Nozari	30 metre rifle	539	18
José Reyes Rodríguez	30 metre rifle	944	29
Gustavo Huet	50 metre rifle	588	30
Oscar Lozano	50 metre rifle	590	26
José de la Torre	50 metre rifle	580	53

== Swimming ==
Men

Athlete	Event	Heat		Semifinal		Final	
Athlete	Event	Time	Rank	Time	Rank	Time	Rank
Alberto Isaac	100 m freestyle	1:00.1	2 Q	1:00.4	7	Did not advance	
Ramón Bravo	400 m freestyle	Did not start		Did not advance			
Angel Maldonado	400 m freestyle	Did not start		Did not advance			
César Borja	1500 m freestyle	21:15.8	25	Did not advance			
Ramón Bravo	1500 m freestyle	20:45.5	19	Did not advance			
Angel Maldonado	1500 m freestyle	20:47.2	21	Did not advance			
Ramón Bravo; Angel Maldonado; Apolonio Castillo; Alberto Isaac	4 × 200 m freestyle	—N/a		9:23.4	4 Q	9:20.2	7
Tonatiuh Gutiérrez	100 m backstroke	1:15.6	5	Did not advance			
Clemente Mejía	100 m backstroke	1:09.8	3 Q	1:09.6	4 Q	1:09.0	4
Apolonio Castillo	200 m breaststroke	2:50.7	15 Q	2:53.5	15	Did not advance	

Women

Athlete	Event	Heat		Semifinal		Final	
Athlete	Event	Time	Rank	Time	Rank	Time	Rank
Magda Bruggemann	100 m freestyle	1:12.5	25	Did not advance			
Magda Bruggemann	400 m freestyle	5:43.8	14 Q	5:42.4	13'	Did not advance	
Magda Bruggemann	100 m backstroke	1:21.4	17	Did not advance			
Helga Diederichsen	200 m breaststroke	3:27.8	6	Did not advance			

== Weightlifting ==
Athlete	Event	Clean & Press		Snatch		Clean & Jerk		Total	
Athlete	Event	Result	Rank	Result	Rank	Result	Rank	Result	Rank
Marcelino Salas	−56 kg	60	19	70	19	100	=15	230	19
Hugo Banda	−67.5 kg	85	=17	80	22	107.5	21	275	21
Armando Rueda	−75 kg	100	=11	95	=18	120	=21	315	17

== Wrestling ==
Key:

- F - Fall.
- D - Decision

Freestyle

Wrestlers who accumulated 5 "bad points" were eliminated. Points were given as follows: 1 point for victories short of a fall and 3 points for every loss.

Athlete	Event	Round 1	Round 2	Round 3	Round 4	Round 5	Round 6	Final	Points	Rank
Athlete	Event	Opposition Result	Opposition Result	Opposition Result	Opposition Result	Opposition Result	Opposition Result	Opposition Result	Points	Rank
Delmiro Bernal	–61 kg	Hamid (EGY); L 3–0 ^{D}	Sjölin (SWE); L ^{F}	Did not advance						
José Luis Pérez	–67 kg	Baumann (SUI); L ^{F}	Did not advance				—N/a	Did not advance		
Eduardo Estrada	–73 kg	Zandi (IRI); L ^{F}	Bhargava (IND); L 2-1 ^{D}	Did not advance						
Eduardo Assam	–79 kg	Bowey (GBR); L 3-0 ^{D}	Sepponen (FIN); L ^{F}	Did not advance		—N/a		Did not advance		
