= David Carradine filmography =

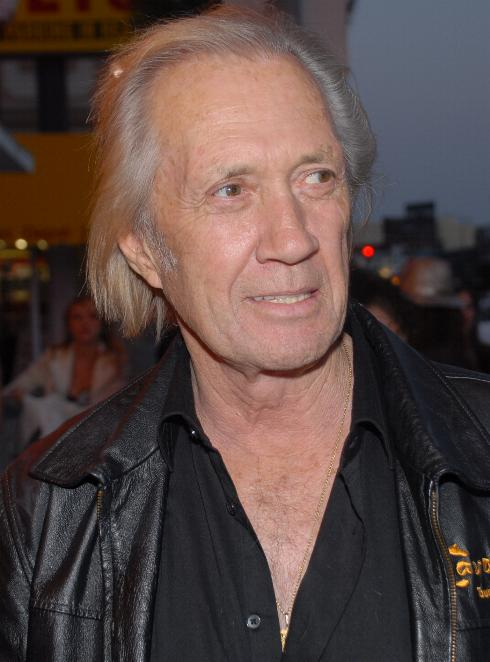
Carradine in April 2008

The following is the filmography of actor and director David Carradine (1936–2009).

== Film ==
Year	Title	Role	Notes
1964	Taggart	Cal Dodge	
1965	Bus Riley's Back in Town	'Stretch'	
1966	Too Many Thieves	Felix	
1967	The Violent Ones	Lucas Barnes	
1969	Heaven with a Gun	Coke Beck	
1969	Young Billy Young	Jesse Boone	
1969	The Good Guys and the Bad Guys	Waco	
1970	The McMasters	White Feather	
1970	Macho Callahan	David Mountford	
1972	Boxcar Bertha	Bill 'Big Bill' Shelly	
1973	The Long Goodbye	Dave a.k.a. Socrates	(Uncredited, min.22:27)
1973	Mean Streets	Drunk	
1973	A Country Mile		
1975	You and Me	Zeto	Also director
1975	Death Race 2000	Frankenstein	
1976	Cannonball	Coy 'Cannonball' Buckman	a.k.a. Carquake
1976	Bound for Glory	Woody Guthrie	
1977	Thunder and Lightning	Harley Thomas	
1977	The Serpent's Egg	Abel Rosenberg	
1978	Gray Lady Down	Captain Gates	
1978	Deathsport	Kaz Oshay	
1978	Circle of Iron	The Blind Man / Monkeyman / Death / Changsha	a.k.a. The Silent Flute
1979	Je te tiens, tu me tiens par la barbichette	Martial Arts Practitioner	
1979	Fast Charlie... the Moonbeam Rider	Charlie Swattle	
1980	The Long Riders	Cole Younger	
1980	Cloud Dancer	Brad Randolph	
1980	Safari 3000	Eddie Mills	
1981	Americana	American Soldier	Also director
1982	Q	Detective Shepard	a.k.a. Serpent & The Winged Serpent
1982	Trick Or Treats	Richard Adams	
1983	Lone Wolf McQuade	Rawley Wilkes	
1984	The Warrior and the Sorceress	Kain	
1984	Downstream	Bryant	
1986	P.O.W. The Escape	Colonel James Cooper	a.k.a. Behind the Enemy Lines
1986	Armed Response	Jim Roth	
1987	The Misfit Brigade	Colonel Von Weisshagen	a.k.a. Wheels of Terror
1988	Run for Your Life	Major Charles Forsythe	
1988	Tropical Snow	Oskar	
1988	Warlords	Dow	
1989	Sonny Boy	Pearl	
1989	Wizards of the Lost Kingdom II	Dark One	
1989	Crime Zone	Jason	
1989	Nowhere to Run	Harmon	
1989	Sundown: The Vampire in Retreat	Jozek Mardulak / Count Dracula	
1989	Try This One for Size	Bradley	
1989	Open Fire	Joe Rourke	
1989	Think Big	Sweeney	
1989	Future Force	John Tucker	
1989	The Mad Bunch	Professor Foxwood	
1989	Night Children	Max	
1989	Crime of Crimes	Captain	
1989	Animal Protector	Colonel Whitlock	
1989	Las huellas del lince	El Lince	
1990	Dune Warriors	Michael	
1990	Bird on a Wire	Eugene Sorenson	
1990	Future Zone	John Tucker	
1990	Martial Law	Dalton Rhodes	
1990	Fatal Secret	Michael LeWinter	
1991	Midnight Fear	Hanley	
1991	Project Eliminator	Ron Morrell	
1991	Capital Punishment	Michael Maltin	
1991	Karate Cop	Dad	
1991	Field of Fire	General Corman	
1992	Evil Toons	Gideon Fisk	
1992	Double Trouble	Mr. C.	
1992	Roadside Prophets	Othello Jones	
1992	Waxwork II: Lost in Time	The Beggar	
1992	Night Rhythms	Vincent	
1992	Distant Justice	Joe Foley	
1992	Animal Instincts	William	
1993	Kill Zone	Colonel Horace Wiggins	
1993	Dead Center	Chavez	
1993	Bitter End		
1993	Code... Death: Frontera Sur	Colonel	
1997	The Rage	Lucas McDermott	
1997	The Good Life		Never released
1997	Macon County Jail	Coley	
1998	Children of the Corn V: Fields of Terror	Luke Enright	
1998	The New Swiss Family Robinson	Sheldon Blake	
1998	Shepherd	Ventriloquist	
1998	The Effects of Magic	The Cabinet Maker	
1998	An American Tail: The Treasure of Manhattan Island	Chief Wulisso	Voice
1998	Kiss of a Stranger	Sean O'Leary	
1998	Sublet	Max Kaufman	
1998	Lovers and Liars	Mr. Montague	
1998	Light Speed	Miles	
1999	Knocking on Death's Door	'Doc' Hadley	
1999	Natural Selection	Louis Dehoven	
1999	Full Blast	Maceo	
1999	Zoo	Drexel Turnquist	
1999	The Puzzle in the Air	The General	
2000	Dangerous Curves	Lemmy	
2000	Down 'n Dirty	Gil Garner	
2000	Nightfall	Gnomen	
2001	G.O.D.	Norman Williams	a.k.a. Guaranteed On Delivery
2001	The Donor	Mike Riordan	
2002	Balto II: Wolf Quest	Nava The Wolf Shaman	Voice
2002	Wheatfield with Crows	Willem Vincent Sr.	
2003	Kill Bill: Volume 1	Bill	
2003	American Reel	James Lee Springer	
2004	Dead & Breakfast	Mr. Wise	
2004	Kill Bill: Volume 2	Bill	
2004	Kill Bill: The Whole Bloody Affair	Bill	
2004	Hair High	Mr. Snerz	Voice
2004	Last Goodbye	Fred McGillicuddie	
2004	Max Havoc: Curse of the Dragon	Grand Master	
2005	Brothers in Arms	Driscoll	
2005	Miracle at Sage Creek	Ike	
2006	Final Move	Captain Baker	
2006	The Last Sect	Van Helsing	
2007	Epic Movie	The Curator	
2007	Bala perdida	Michael Morrison	
2007	Treasure Raiders	Pierre	
2007	Richard III	Buckingham	
2007	How to Rob a Bank	Nick	
2007	Fall Down Dead	Wade Douglas	
2007	Permanent Vacation	Old Man	
2007	Fuego	'Lobo'	
2007	Big Stan	The Master	
2007	Homo Erectus	Mookoo / Uncle Unky	
2007	Blizhniy Boy: The Ultimate Fighter	Mikhail	
2008	Hell Ride	'The Deuce'	
2008	Camille	Bob 'Cowboy Bob'	
2008	Last Hour	Detective Mike Stone	
2008	Break	The Bishop	
2008	Death Race	Niles York / Frankenstein	Voice
2008	The Golden Boys	Captain Zebulon Hedge	
2008	Kandisha	The American	
2008	Archie's Final Project (My Suicide)	Vargas	
2009	Absolute Evil	Raf McCane	
2009	Road of No Return	Mr. Hover	
2009	Crank: High Voltage	Poon Dong	
2009	Autumn	Phillip	
2009	Dark Fields	Clive Jonis	
2009	Bad Cop	Detective Humes	
2009	All Hell Broke Loose	US Marshal Ian McHenry	
2010	Detention	Principal Hoskins	
2010	True Legend	Anthony	
2010	Six Days in Paradise	Vernon Billings	
2010	Money to Burn	Klau	
2011	Stretch	Monteiro	
2012	Eldorado	The Spirit Guide	
2013	The Banksters, Madoff with America	Neal	
2013	Night of the Templar	Shopkeeper	UK title: Knights Templar
2017	The American Connection	General Rusfnar	

== Television series ==
Year	Title	Role	Notes
1963	Armstrong Circle Theatre	(Note: No available source gives any of the characters names. David Carradine described it as a live telecast in which: "My part was one fairly long speech, and that was it. No standing around in the background. In and out.")	Episode: "Secret Document X256"
1963	East Side/West Side	Hal Sewoski	Episode: "Go Fight City Hall"
1963	Wagon Train	John Mason	Episode: "The Eli Bancroft Story"
1964	Arrest and Trial	Wally Carpen	Episode: "The Black Flower"
1964	The Virginian	The Utah Kid	Episode: "The Intruders"
1964	Alfred Hitchcock Hour	Art Thief	Episode: "Ten Minutes From Now" (Uncredited, min.43:14) (Note: The closing titles of the episode name Edward Mallory as “The Thief,” but there is no other speaking “thief” in the scene but Donnelly Rhodes and David Carradine.)
1965	Bob Hope Presents the Chrysler Theatre	Fitzhugh	Episode: "The War and Eric Kurtz"
1965	Alfred Hitchcock Hour	Edward Clarke	Episode: "Thou Still Unravished Bride"
1966	Shane	Shane	17 episodes
1967	Saga of Western Man	The Aztec (voice)	Episode: "Cortez and the Legend"
1967	Coronet Blue	Walter Arnold	Episode: "The Rebels" (Series filmed in 1965)
1967	Cimarron Strip	Gene Gauge	Episode: "The Hunted"
1968	Saga of Western Man	The Rebel (voice)	Episode: "The Road to Gettysburg"
1968-1971	Ironside	Various	3 episodes
1970	The Name of the Game	Jason	Episode: "Tarot"
1971	Gunsmoke	Clint	Episode: "Lavery"
1971	Night Gallery	Gideon	Segment: "The Phantom Farmhouse" (Note: The second segment, "Silent Snow, Secret Snow," based on the short story by Conrad Aiken, was narrated by Orson Welles and starred by Radames Pera.)
1972–1975	Kung Fu	Kwai Chang Caine	63 episodes
1975	The Family Holvak	Craw	Episodes: "The Long Way Home: Parts 1 & 2"
1979	Mr. Horn	Tom Horn	Parts 1 & 2
1981	Today's FBI	Robert Jeffries	Episode: "Hostage"
1981	Darkroom	Biker/Hitchhiker	Episode: "The Partnership"
1983	The Fall Guy	Pat Patterson	Episode: "To the Finish"
1983	Faces of Culture	Narrator	Documentary, 19 episodes
1984	Airwolf	Dr. Robert Winchester	Episode: "Mind of the Machine"
1984	Partners in Crime	Hermanski	Episode: "Paddles Up"
1984	The Fall Guy	Caretaker	Episode: "October the 31st"
1984	Fox Mystery Theater	Michael	Episode: "A Distant Scream"
1985	The Fall Guy	Himself	Episode: "Dead Ringer"
1985-1986	North and South Book 1	Justin LaMotte	8 episodes
1986	Amazing Stories	Calvin	Episode: "Thanksgiving"
1987	Night Heat	Theodore Telford	Episode: "Tell Me a Story"
1987-1989	Matlock	Jimmy Legrand/Steve Mazarowski	2 episodes
1990	The Young Riders	The Buzzard Eater	Episode: "Ghosts"
1990	The Ray Bradbury Theater	Spender	Episode: "And the Moon Be Still as Bright"
1992	Human Target	Harry Solow	Episode "Second Chance"
1993–1997	Kung Fu: The Legend Continues	Kwai Chang Caine	88 episodes
1997	Dr. Quinn, Medicine Woman	Houston Currier	Episode: "Hostage"
1997	Captain Simian & the Space Monkeys	Mandrax (voice)	2 episodes
1999	Profiler	Christopher Joe Allman	Episode: "Inheritance"
1999	Charmed	Tempus	Episode: "Déjà Vu All Over Again"
1999	Acapulco H.E.A.T.	Victor Garrison	Episode: "Code Name: Flight 401"
2000	Family Law	Andrew Weller	3 episodes
2000	Just Shoot Me!	Himself	Episode: "Brandi, You're a Fine Girl"
2001	Queen of Swords	El Serpiente	Episode: "The Serpent"
2001	Lizzie McGuire	Himself	Episode: "Between a Rock and a Bra Place"
2001	Jackie Chan Adventures	Lo Pei (voice)	Episode: "The Warrior Incarnate"
2001	The Nightmare Room	Mr. Farber	Episode: "Tangled Web"
2001	Largo Winch	Nério Winch	Episode: "Revelations"
2001	Titus	Bob Hawkins	Episode: "Houseboat"
2002	King of the Hill	Junichiro Hill (voice)	Episode: "Returning Japanese"
2002	Largo Winch	Nério Winch	Episode: "Bloodlines"
2003–2004	Alias	Conrad	2 episodes
2004–2005	Wild West Tech	Himself (host)	23 episodes
2005	Eve	Kung Fu Master	Episode: "Kung Fu Divas"
2005–2006	Danny Phantom	Clockwork (voice)	2 episodes
2006	Medium	Jessica's Brother	Episode: "Allison Wonderland"
2006	Celebrity Paranormal Project	Himself	Episode: "Tanner's Ghost"
2006	Son of the Dragon	Bird	2 episodes
2007	In Case of Emergency	Guru Danny	Episode: "Let Go, Let Golf"
2008	Tiempo final	El Chango	Episode: "Lesbianas"
2009	Mental	Gideon Graham	Episode: "Book of Judges"
2009	Celebrity Ghost Stories	Himself	Episode: Scott Baio/Joan Rivers/Teri Polo/David Carradine

== Television films ==
Year	Title	Role	Notes
1947	A Christmas Carol	Young Scrooge	Live telecast with John Carradine as Scrooge
1967	Johnny Belinda	Locky	
1971	Maybe I'll Come Home in the Spring	Flack	
1980	Gauguin the Savage	Paul Gauguin	
1980	High Noon, Part II: The Return of Will Kane	Ben Irons	
1984	Jealousy	Bobby Dee	
1985	The Bad Seed	Leroy Jessup	
1986	Kung Fu: The Movie	Kwai Chang Caine	
1986	Oceans of Fire	J.C. Busch	
1987	Six Against the Rock	Bernard "Bernie" Paul Coy	
1988	I Saw What You Did	Stephen	
1991	The Gambler Returns: The Luck of the Draw	Kwai Chang Caine	
1997	Last Stand at Saber River	Duane Kidston	
1998	Lovers & Liars	Mr. Montague	
1999	Knocking on Death's Door	'Doc' Hadley	
2001	Warden of Red Rock	Mike Sullivan	
2002	The Outsider	Haines	
2008	Kung Fu Killer	Crane	
2010	Dinocroc vs. Supergator	Jason Drake	

== Music video ==
Year	Title	Role	Notes
1987	Love Roulette; Don Johnson	Man playing dice	"Heartbeat - 04 - Love Roulette" on YouTube
2008	Burnin' Up; Jonas Brothers	Kung Fu master	"Burnin' Up" on YouTube
2013	Devil; Ours	Devil	"OURS - Devil" on YouTube

== Audiobooks ==
Year	Author	Title	Notes
2005	John Twelve Hawks	The Traveler	First Novel of The Fourth Realm Trilogy
2008	Jack Kerouac	On the Road	Discogs lists earlier versions of this audiobook, in cassette tape.

== Video game ==
Year	Title	Voice role
2006	Danny Phantom: The Ultimate Enemy	Clockwork
2006	Saints Row	William Sharp
