= Hugo Stiglitz =

Mexican actor

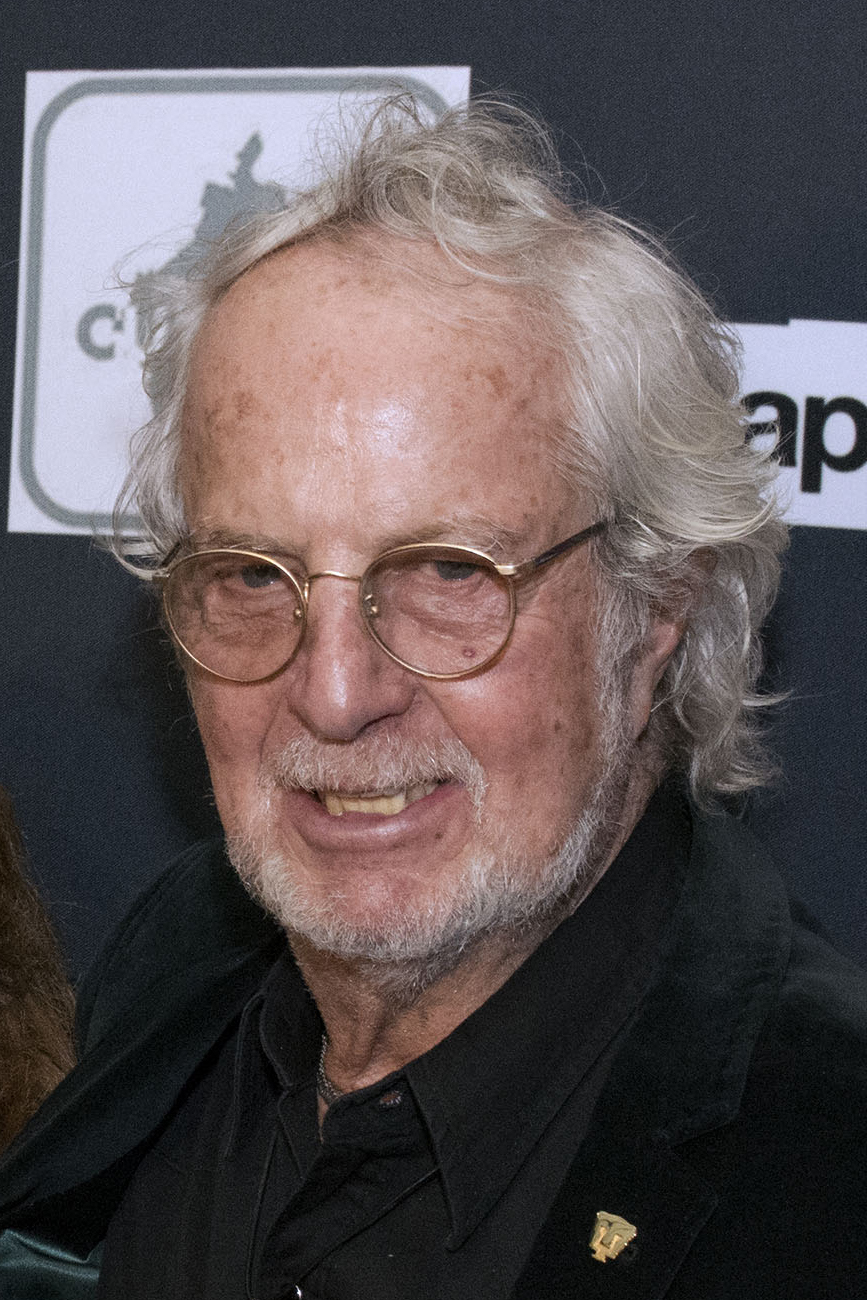
- Born: Hugo Stiglitz López; August 28, 1940 (age 86); Mexico City, Mexico
- Education: National Autonomous University of Mexico
- Occupation: Actor
- Years active: 1969-Current
- Notable work: Tintorera; Night of a 1000 Cats; Under the Volcano; Cielo rojo

Hugo Stiglitz López (born August 28, 1940) is a Mexican actor, best known for his genre film roles in the 1970s and 80's.

== Early life and education ==
Stiglitz was born in Mexico City, to Austrian businessman Sigmund Stiglitz and his Argentine-born wife María de los Ángeles López. An avid footballer, Stiglitz originally tried out for the Universidad Autónoma de Guadalajara's team, but failed to make the cut. He then studied civil engineering at the National Autonomous University of Mexico.

== Career ==
Stiglitz entered acting thanks to friendships with actors Pedro Armendáriz Jr. and Angélica María. He was discovered by director René Cardona Jr.

Stiglitz is perhaps most well known for his film roles in the 1970s and 1980s in Mexico in such horror films as Tintorera and Night of a Thousand Cats. During the 70s, he was considered a leading man alongside the likes of Jorge Rivero and Andrés García. He gained more international recognition for his roles in B-movies like Blood Feast (1972), Tintorera (1977), The Bermuda Triangle (1978), Cyclone (also 1978), and the Italian-Spanish co-production Nightmare City (1980). He also played a supporting role in American director John Huston's Under the Volcano (1984).

In 2011, he made his telenovela debut on Cielo rojo. He subsequently appeared on Secretos de familia.

== In popular culture ==
Quentin Tarantino paid a tribute to him by naming a character "Hugo Stiglitz" (played by actor Til Schweiger) in the film Inglourious Basterds.

== Selected filmography ==
- Las fieras (1969) as Tony
- ((Robinson Crusoé - 1969 )))
- Macho Callahan (1970) as Man #1
- Las figuras de arena (1970)
- Robinson Crusoe (1970) as Robinson Crusoe
- Nido de fieras (1971)
- Los desalmados (1971)
- Bang bang... al hoyo (1971)
- Night of a 1000 Cats (1972) as Hugo
- Vanessa (1972) as Alex
- Un pirata de doce años (1972) as Morgan
- Pilotos de combate (1973)
- El juez de la soga (1973) as Kirk Morgan
- Robinson y Viernes en la Isla Encantada (1973) as Robinson Crusoe
- Uno para la horca (1973) as Anthony Trevor
- El señor de Osanto (1974)
- El llanto de la tortuga (1975) as Héctor
- El valle de los miserables (1975) as Felipe Aguirre
- Viaje fantástico en globo (1975) as Professor Fergusson
- Sobrevivientes de los Andes (1976) as Francisco
- Longitud de guerra (1976) as San José
- Tintorera (1977) as Steven
- El rey de los gorilas (1977) as Ape
- The Bermuda Triangle (1978) as Capt. Mark Briggs
- Los pequeños privilegios (1978) as Hugo
- Cyclone (1978) as Pilot
- Oro rojo (1978) as Víctor
- Mil millas al sur (1978) as Dany Montero
- Lo blanco, lo rojo y lo negro (1979)
- Bloody Marlene (1979) as Jim McCutchen
- Guyana: Crime of the Century (1979) as Cliff Robson
- Traficantes de pánico (1980) as Captain Sylvester
- En mil pedazos (1980) as Jorge Sueiro
- Nightmare City (1980) as Dean Miller
- Fabricantes de pánico (1980)
- El fantasma del lago (1981) as don Gonzalo Ruiz
- 357 magnum (1981)
- Buitres sobre la ciudad (1980) as Theo
- Black Jack (aka Asalto al casino) (1981) as Police Commissioner Angel Carvenas
- Goma-2 (1984) as Koldo
- Under the Volcano (1984) as Sinarquista
- The Treasure of the Amazon (1985) as Riverboat Captain
- Cementerio del terror (1985) as Dr. Cardan
- Masacre en el río Tula (1985) as El Man
- Rosa de la frontera (1985)
- El escuadrón de la muerte (1985) as Sergio Enriquez
- El día de los Albañiles II (1985)
- Cuando corrio el alazan (1985)
- Matanza en Matamoros (1986)
- La muerte de un pistolero (1986)
- Policia judicial federal (1987)
- Los verduleros II (1987) as The Killer
- Mauro el mojado (1987) as Johnny Ventura
- Traficantes de cocaina (1987)
- Sueño de Tony (1987)
- Mente asesina (1987)
- Con el odio en la piel (1988)
- Counterforce (1988) as The Blond
- Los gatos de las azoteas (1988) as El Adivino
- El placer de la venganza (1988)
- La noche de la bestia (1988) as Willi
- La gallera (1988)
- Durazo, la verdadera historia (1988)
- AR-15: Comando implacable (1988)
- 3 lancheros muy picudos (1989) as Hugo
- Open Fire (1989) as Don Gaspar
- Hasta que la muerte nos separe (1989) as Orlando
- El loco Bronco (1989) as Virgilio Rojas
- El pájaro con suelas (1989) as César
- El diario íntimo de una cabaretera (1989) as Marcelo
- Traficante por ambición (1989) as Capitan Gordon
- Seducción y muerte (1989)
- La mafia tiembla II (1989)
- Bonampak (1989)
- Aventuras que matan (1989)
- Asalto en la frontera (1989)
- El inocente y las pecadoras (1990)
- Keiko en peligro (1990)
- Noche de pánico (1990)
- Noche de fieras (1990) as Ernesto
- El protector de la mafia (1990)
- Comando de federales (1990) as Comandante Aguila
- Cargas prohibidas (1990)
- Camarena vive (1990)
- El 30-30 (1991)
- Mujer de cabaret (1991) as Don Lalo
- Trágico carnaval (1991)
- Secuestro equivocado (1991)
- La ley de la mafia (1991) as El comandante
- Escuadrón suicida (1991)
- Armas, robo y muerte (1991)
- Alarido del terror (1991) as Roberto
- Tequila (1992)
- Corrupción encadenada (1992)
- Más allá del deseo (1992) as Juan
- La dama y el judicial (1992)
- Imperio blanco (1992) as Comandante Victor
- Cobra silenciosa (1992)
- Camaleon: Atentado a Castro (1992)
- Perseguido (1993) as Teniente Aquiles
- Obligado a matar (1993) as Victor
- La voz de los caracoles (1993) as comandante Drako
- Entre el poder y el deseo (1993) as Quintana
- Frontera Sur (1993) as Aguila
- Chicas en peligro (1993)
- Bulldog (1993) as Muriel
- Las esmeraldas son sangre (1994)
- Mujeres infieles (1995) as Eduardo
- Leyendas de amor y muerte (1995)
- El arrecife de los Alacranes (1995) as Capitán Elias
- Pueblo de violencia (1995) as Jesús Morones
- Magnicídio (1995)
- Las nieves de enero (1995)
- La fuga de los Pérez (1995)
- Crímenes de pasión (1995) as Roldán Carmona
- La mujer de los dos (1996) as Francisco
- Víctimas de la ambición (1996) as Lic. Ordoñez
- La juez Lobo (1996)
- Una luz en la oscuridad (1997)
- El último cazador (1997)
- El asesinato (1997) as Marcelo / Abogado
- Naked Lies (1998) as Santiago
- El culebrero (1998) as El Griego
- Unidos por el destino (1998) as Colombiano
- Perro de cadena (1998)
- El bronco negro (1998)
- Cazador de soplones (1998) as Hector del Valle
- Cazador de cazadores (1998) as Ermitano
- Bajadores de narcos (1998) as Mr. Mulata
- Angeluz (1998) as Dr. Vera
- 2 monjitas en peligro (1998)
- Crisis (1998)
- Sonora y sus ojos negros (1999)
- Siete millones (1999)
- Pollitas de cuenta (1999)
- Polícia de narcóticos 2 (1999)
- Las dos toneladas (1999)
- Informe secreto de la D.E.A. (1999)
- El profeta (1999)
- El mojado fracasado (1999) as Ernesto Quintero
- El heredero (1999)
- El comerciante (1999)
- Polifemo (2000, Short) as The Cyclop Polifemo (voice)
- Los 2 compas (2000)
- La avioneta amarilla (2000)
- El regreso de las cobras negras (2000)
- The Pearl (2001) as Beggar One
- Perros de pelea (2001)
- La fiera de la montaña (2001) as El abuelo
- El vengador de cabrones (2001)
- El corrido del hijo de Simon Blanco (2001)
- Chinango (2002)
- Simón, el gran varón (2002) as Benito
- La tragedia de Lamberto Quintero (2002)
- El tuerto de la sierra (2002)
- El nuevo corrido de Arnulfo Gonzalez (2002)
- El corrido del comandante Macario Leyba (2002)
- Seis días en la oscuridad (2003) as Prof. Hernandez
- Viva Villa Cabrones (2003)
- El corrido de Valente Quintero (2003)
- Dos gallos de Guanajuato (2003)
- Para Matar a un Asesino/To Kill a Killer (2003)
- Naturaleza muerta (2003)
- Las pasiones de sor Juana (2004) as Don Rodrigo
- La diosa del mar (2005) as Baltazar Ojeda
- Emiliano Cadena: El méxicano 2 (2007)
- Chinango (2009) as Licenciado Mendez
- Cielo rojo (2011, TV Series) as Gonzalo Molina
- El Hombre de Negro II (2013) as Don Evaristo Juárez
- Instructions Not Included (2013) as Johnny Bravo
- El diario de una prostituta (2013) as Tom Wells
- Los Tres Hacendados (2015) as Alvaro
- Con mis propias manos (2015) as Don Esteban
- Señora acero la coyote (2016, TV Series) as Carlos Delgado
- Mas Que Buitre (2016) as Comandante Roman Rios
- El ocaso del cazador (2017)
- El Ondeado: ¿Héroe o villano? (2017) as Hernan
- Secuestro Anonimo (2017) as Comandante
- American Curious (2018) as Abraham Silva
- El Complot Mongol (2018) as Hugo Stiglitz
- Un sentimiento honesto en el calabozo del olvido (2019) as Abir Benacerraf

== Honours ==
- Nosferatu Award: In October 2025 Stiglitz was honoured with the Nosferatu Award at 58th Sitges Film Festival in Sitges.
