= João Barrento =

Portuguese general and equestrian (1907–1988)

Personal information
- Full name: João Eduardo Gamarro Correia Barrento
- National team: Portugal
- Born: 14 November 1907 Vila Viçosa, Portugal
- Died: 1988 (aged 80–81)

Sport
- Sport: Equestrian

João Eduardo Gamarro Correia Barrento (14 November 1907–1988) was a Portuguese general and equestrian. In the military, he held significant commands in colonial Angola as this nation fought for independence from Portugal; in show jumping he represented Portugal at the Olympic Games and was head of the nation's equestrian team.

== Military career ==
Barrento graduated from the Portuguese military college in 1924, a contemporary of Carlos Silva Freire; Barrento was one of the most successful graduates of his class, and he and Freire were the only future generals. At military college, Barrento excelled in equestrianism and, along with Fernando Paes and Amadeu Santo-André Pereira, became known as a distinguished cavalryman. Barrento was a captain in the Portuguese cavalry in 1939, and was a major by 1950. By 1955, he was in charge of the Military Riding School (Escola de Equitação Militar, later under the Centro Militar de Educação Física e Desportos).

He was promoted from trained colonel (coronel-tirocinado) to brigadier general in 1962. As a general, between 1963 and 1965 he was the commander of the 11th commando regiment during the Overseas War in Angola (Angolan War of Independence). When he was a brigadier he was described as being "rightly considered one of the most distinguished officers of his generation due to his high qualities as a citizen and soldier." In 1965 he was part of a delegation on behalf of the President of Portugal – along with Angola governor general Silvino Silvério Marques – which visited the land claims of the Companhia de Diamantes de Angola. At the time, Barrento was the commander of the Eastern Intervention Zone in Angola. He was given command of the 3ª Região Militar, headquartered in Évora, in 1966; he had been second-in-command of this region directly beforehand and, at some point prior, had served as commander general of the National Republican Guard.

Barrento was director of the Revista da Cavalaria, the cavalry's official almanac and magazine, from at least 1939.

== Show jumping ==
Outside of the army, he competed in and managed equestrian show jumping. His first recorded competition was the Lisbon CSIO in 1931, when he rode horse Essex as part of the Portugal team that came third. In 1933, he placed fifth in the army's trials for a military equestrian team to compete abroad, being accepted to the team that went to Nice along with Luis Ivens Ferraz, Luís Mena e Silva, Dom Domingos de Sousa, and Hélder Martins among others. He next competed in a team including civilians in 1945 at the Global Champions Tour Madrid. Barrento is listed in the roll of honour of the Portuguese Equestrian Federation.

He took part in two equestrian events at the 1948 Summer Olympics; riding horse Alcoa he placed 22nd (with 42.50 penalty points) in the "Prix de Nations" individual placings on 22 May 1948, while Portugal was eliminated in the team placings as not all their riders completed the course. His participation has also been recorded under the name José Correia Barrento. At the Lisbon CSIO, Barrento was on the Portuguese team, riding Alcoa, when Portugal came first in 1948, and rode Raso when they finished second in 1949. He was part of the team that competed at the 1948 Global Champions Tour Madrid.

Barrento was in charge of the Portuguese equestrian team between 1950 and 1953. A three-person team, headed by Barrento, travelled to Rio de Janeiro for international trials in 1950 and he returned to the Champions Tour Madrid in 1951 and 1952, the team placing fourth and fifth respectively, with Barrento riding Raso at both. He then served in a non-competitive role at the 1952 Summer Olympics as head of the Portuguese equestrian delegation. In 1953, Portugal, featuring Barrento riding Raso, came fourth at the International Jumping Competition Nice. He was also part of the team that finished third at the 1955 Dublin Horse Show, riding Impecável. The horse Impecável was best known for being ridden by lieutenant Neto de Almeida, and in 1956 was granted to captain Cruz Azevedo for international competition.

== Personal life and death ==
Barrento was married to Maria Teolinda de Sequeira Queiróz Martins, and they had at least two children. A son, António Eduardo Queiroz Martins Barrento, followed Barrento to become a general and went on to serve in NATO and as chief of general staff of the Portuguese Army. Barrento's daughter, Maria Theolinda Queiroz Martins Barrento, married major-general Mário Lemos Pires; their son, Barrento's grandson, is major-general Nuno Correia Barrento de Lemos Pires.

Barrento died in 1988.

== Honours ==
Barrento received military honours including:

Ribbon	Award	Date awarded
	Cross of Military Merit (with white decoration, first class; Spain)	1951
	Order of Isabella the Catholic (Knight; Spain)	1951
	Military Order of Christ (Knight)	1959
	Military Order of Aviz (Grand Officer)	1962 (Note: Barrento was first made an Officer of the Order of Aviz in 1941, and was made Commander in 1955.)
