= Spark (Twelve Hawks novel) =

2014 novel by John Twelve Hawks

- First edition
- Author: John Twelve Hawks
- Cover artist: Michael J. Windsor
- Language: English
- Genre: Science fiction novel
- Publisher: Doubleday
- Publication date: 2014
- Publication place: United States
- Media type: Print (hardcover)
- Pages: 320
- ISBN: 978-0385538671

Spark is John Twelve Hawks's fourth novel, published in 2014 in the United States and Great Britain. It is a stand-alone novel that does not use the characters or setting of Hawks's Fourth Realm Trilogy. Film rights for the book were sold to DreamWorks.

== Fictional world ==
Spark describes a dystopian world set a few years in the future. Because of a world-wide terrorist attack called "The Day of Rage," mass surveillance has become public and pervasive. Almost everyone carries an identification card or a radio-frequency identification chip implanted under the skin. The chip can be read by the Eye system, "allowing the government to track physical movement and determine if an individual is operating outside of his/her normal parameters." In addition, robots are beginning to replace the human work force. There is growing unemployment and neo-Luddite group called "The Sons of Ned" organizes demonstrations and commits acts of violence. In her New York Times review, Janet Maslin pointed out that René Descartes’s famous statement Cogito, ergo sum "comes up repeatedly as a matter of crucial important in a world where artificial intelligence grows more powerful every day."

== Characters ==
The book is a first person novel narrated by Jacob Underwood, a man who has suffered a severe brain injury after a motorcycle accident. Underwood suffers from Cotard delusion, a real-life neurological condition in which the afflicted person thinks that he or she is dead. He has created an elaborate epistemological system based on his belief that he is a "Shell" (a body) that contains a "Spark" (his conscious self). Underwood is hired by the Brooks Danford Group, a New York investment bank, to work as an assassin, eliminating threats to the bank's clients. "Underwood’s strength as a hired killer is the emotionless, robotic nature that allows him to operate with logical, ruthless precision."

Miss Holquist is Underwood's handler at the bank (she never reveals her real name). Although she has two daughters—one about to be married—she is a ruthless individual who has no belief in any kind of larger morality. In a crucial speech, she reduces that world to sub-atomic particles: “Everything that goes on in the universe is a physical process that involves boson particles that have an integer spin such as one or two, and fermion particles that have odd, half-integer spins.”

Emily Buchanan is young executive working for the investment bank that disappears with some top secret information. She turns out to be involved with "anti-social" groups that are opposed to the system of government control and surveillance.

== Critical reaction ==
Critical reaction to Spark was generally positive.

In a starred review in Booklist, reviewer David Pitt wrote: "It’s been several years since the Fourth Realm trilogy ended, and some readers might have wondered if the author had only one story to tell. But guess what? As good as the Fourth Realm books were, this one may be even more appealing: less fantastic, more grounded in a contemporary real world, with a narrator who is deeply scarred and endlessly fascinating."

In her Washington Post review, Nancy Hightower wrote that the novel "is a fantastic blend of action and deeper questions about what it means to be human."

== Film adaptation ==
In October, 2013 Deadline reported that the film rights to Spark were sold to DreamWorks.
