= Frontera Sur (1993 film) =

1993 film

- Directed by: Ernesto García Cabral; Hugo Stiglitz
- Starring: Hugo Stiglitz; David Carradine; Isaac Hayes; Pedro Armendáriz Jr. Rojo Grau; Mineko Mori; Ricardo Noriega; Luis Reynoso A Andaluz Russell; Jorge Guzmán; Adrián Castillo
- Cinematography: Nadine Markova
- Edited by: Saúl Aupart
- Music by: Luis Bacalov
- Release date: 1993
- Running time: 90 min.
- Countries: Mexico; United States
- Languages: Spanish; English

Frontera Sur is a 1993 Mexican action film directed by Ernesto García Cabral and Hugo Stiglitz. The film's music was composed by Luis Bacalov.

== Cast ==
- Hugo Stiglitz
- David Carradine
- Isaac Hayes
- Pedro Armendáriz Jr.
- Rojo Grau
- Mineko Mori
- Ricardo Noriega
- Luis Reynoso
- Andaluz Russell
- Jorge Guzmán
- Adrián Castillo
