= Ángel Maldonado =

Ángel Maldonado may refer to:

- Ángel Maldonado (footballer)
- Angel Maldonado (swimmer)
