= Blood Feast (1972 film) =

1972 film by René Cardona Jr.

- Promotional poster
- Spanish: La noche de los mil gatos
- Literally: Night of a Thousand Cats
- Directed by: René Cardona Jr.
- Written by: René Cardona Jr. Mario Zacarias
- Produced by: René Cardona Jr. Mario Zacarias
- Starring: Hugo Stiglitz; Anjanette Comer; Zulma Faiad
- Release dates: 3 August 1972 (Mexico); 1 November 1974 (U.S.)
- Running time: 93 minutes (original version); 63 minutes (U.S. cut)
- Country: Mexico
- Languages: Spanish; English
- Budget: $1,500

Blood Feast (Spanish: La noche de los mil gatos, lit. Night of a Thousand Cats) is a 1972 Mexican exploitation horror film written and directed by René Cardona Jr. It was released in the United States in 1974.

== Plot ==
Hugo, a playboy serial killer (Hugo Stiglitz), stalks beautiful women in his helicopter, seducing them under false pretenses and inviting them to his castle estate. There, he kills them in various gruesome ways with the help of his groundskeeper, Dorgo. He then uses their flesh to feed a plethora of cats that he keeps in a fenced-in pit and preserves their pickled heads as trophies inside glass jars. A doctor who stops by the castle and eventually even his groundskeeper also become meals for the cats. Eventually, one brave woman lacks fear of death, and she miraculously escapes his clutches, accidentally making a hole in the fence around the cat pit (which eventually allows the cats to escape). During the fight, Hugo gets hit in the face. Sensing his injury, the cats gang up, descend upon Hugo, and finish him off, allowing the woman to escape unharmed.

== Cast ==
- Hugo Stiglitz as Hugo
- Anjanette Comer as Cathy
- Zulma Faiad as Dancer
- Christa Linder as Christa
- Barbara Angely as Barbara
- Gerardo Zepeda as Dogo

== Release ==
The film was released under the title Night of a Thousand Cats in Tampa, Florida on 1 November 1974.

=== Critical response ===
Shock Cinema Magazine deemed Blood Feast possibly "the worst film ever made about killer felines", and said it was very silly with little entertainment value and bad acting, although still better than Cardona's later films. The Terror Trap gave it 2 stars, calling it "rather unimpressive", "mild", "drab", and "uninspired". Tars Tarkas suggested that cats are intrinsically not very scary, even when there's a thousand of them, rating the film 2/10. Aggressions Animales reckoned it one of René Cardona Jr's worst films, and said that aside from a few of its ideas, there was nothing interesting.

=== Home media ===
VCI Entertainment issued a double-feature Blu-ray in June 2022 which also features Mary, Mary, Bloody Mary (1972).

== Technical details ==
Blood Feast was shot in color. It was released in the US in 1974 with an 'R' rating by the MPAA. Unedited, it runs 93 minutes; the American version, however, runs 63 minutes. The movie was filmed in Spanish, but has been dubbed in English.

== Legacy ==
Blood Feast has a very small fan base, but has made a home for itself among exploitation film fans. At its release, the film caused mild controversy due to its seemingly cruel treatment of cats. One scene depicts Hugo violently grabbing a large white cat and tossing it over a high wall into its pen. The camera does not cut away, indicating that the real cat was thrown.
