= The Dark River (novel) =

2007 novel by John Twelve Hawks

- Author: John Twelve Hawks
- Language: English
- Series: The Fourth Realm
- Genre: Science fiction novel
- Publisher: Doubleday
- Publication date: 2007
- Publication place: United States
- Media type: Print (hardcover)
- Pages: 384
- ISBN: 0-385-51429-8
- OCLC: 85485197
- Preceded by: The Traveler
- Followed by: The Golden City

The Dark River is a 2007 New York Times bestselling novel by John Twelve Hawks. The book is the second in a trilogy of dystopian novels written by reclusive author John Twelve Hawks. The Fourth Realm Trilogy has been translated into 25 languages and has sold more than 1.5 million books.

== The world of The Dark River ==
The Dark River opens several months after the events of The Traveler. Beginning in New York City the book takes us around the world to London, Ireland, Ethiopia, and Germany. The setting evolving around the characters Maya, Gabriel, Vicki, and Hollis as they set out to protect this world (the Fourth Realm) from the changes set in motion by a group called the Brethren.

The book is science fiction mixed with a religious fantasy that talks about such topics as The Ark of the Covenant, free running, Tibetan cosmology, and modern methods of security. The author trying to bring such topics as the progression of man lying in his free ability to choose by escaping the confines of a prison-like life.

Mr. Hawks has returned with “The Dark River”, the follow-up to The Traveler and the second volume in the Fourth Realm Trilogy. In “The Dark River”, readers will once again join Maya, a reluctant Harlequin who must battle more than just the Tabula to keep everyone alive; Gabriel Corrigan, one of the last remaining Travelers and Maya’s ward; Michael Corrigan, Gabriel’s older brother and fellow Traveler who has sided with the Brethren, though for his own reasons; Nathan Boone, the relentless Brethren Head of Security; Victory From Sin Fraser (Vicki), a member of the Church of Isaac T. Jones who believes in Debt Not Paid; and Hollis Wilson, a former martial arts teacher who has embraced the Harlequin way. Among the storylines that are developed in “The Dark River”, the readers get to see the relationship between Maya & Gabriel mature; learn a bit more about the different realms, including portals and the Ark of the Covenant; follow as Michael & Gabriel search for their father, another traveler who may actually still be alive; become involved in intrigue & conspiracy within the higher hierarchy of the Brethren; get a more intimate glimpse at the Harlequins Mother Blessing & Linden; join with Free Runners whose lifestyle is all about breaking free from the Vast Machine; and watch as the Brethren take a huge step forward in seeing their virtual Panopticon become a reality...

== The main characters ==
- Maya — The character Maya begins her story as a Harlequin who has a duty to Gabriel a traveler. From her youth she was taught how to fight the brethren, also called the Tabula. She is in love with Gabriel, which is against the Harlequin tradition.
- Gabriel — Is a Traveler. One of the last of his kind who has the power to travel outside of our realm to one of the seven other Realms. Gabriel is a thrill seeker.
- Mother Blessing — Is a Harlequin. It was her duty to protect Gabriel's Father from the Brethren. Mother Blessing knew Maya as a child and contributed to Maya's training as a Harlequin.
- Michael — Is Gabriel's brother. He is now part of the Brethren. The brethren are a group who wish to enslave all of the fourth realm through constant surveillance.
- Nathan Boone — The head of security for the Brethren. Boone is a ruthless killer that feels he is doing the right thing when working for the Brethren.
- Alice Chen — is a small and serious eleven-year-old girl who was living in New Harmony before her parents and everyone else living there were killed by the Tabula aka the Brethren.
- Kennard Nash — leader of the Brethren.

== Short plot summary ==
While hiding out in New York, Gabriel gets wind that his father Matthew is at a convent in London so he goes there himself, with Maya and Victory following soon after and Hollis later (he stays to make the Brethren think Gabriel is still in NY). At the convent, Gabriel gets another sign that his dad is in a convent on an Island off the west coast of Ireland. In the meantime, he's met the Free Runners and won a race over buildings and walls for them, becoming their hero. When Maya and Victory arrive, they help him go to the Irish island where they find another Harlequin, Mother Blessing guarding Matthew who has been traveling in the first realm (hell) for months. Maya and Gabriel have sex and Mother Blessing finds out, disapproves, and decides to take Gabriel back to London as his guard leaving Maya guarding Matthew. Maya decides she must go to Gabriel, so she leaves Victory guarding Matthew just as the Tabula attacks. Victory is killed by splicers (genetically engineered animals) and the Tabula, with Michael Corrigan now in a position of power, take possession of his dad's body. Gabriel decides to travel to the first realm to try to rescue his dad. He gets captured there and tortured for information on how residents can escape. Maya learns that Gabriel has gone to the first realm and that non-travelers can travel to the realms through portals, and that some ancients knew the secret. With help of a Roman who once knew her dad, she learns that the Ark of the Covenant might be such a portal and that it's in Ethiopia. She goes there, it is, she goes to the first realm, rescues Gabriel, and he finds his way back. But Maya must return through the same portal she came in through, so she is left in first realm having to fight her way out when book 2 ends. The book ends leaving the reader wondering whether or not Maya has escaped from the first realm.

== Literary significance and reception ==
Reviews for The Dark River were mixed. Publishers Weekly described is novel as "a saga that's part A Wrinkle in Time, part The Matrix and part Kurosawa epic. Given the complicated plot and complex setting, readers are advised to read The Traveler first." David Pitt reviewing for Booklist had very positive remarks for the novel describing it as "a hugely enjoyable book, a globe-trotting adventure that’s a treat for everyone who likes a good thriller and a special treat for fans of stories involving secret societies, global conspiracies, and mysticism." Kirkus Reviews was more critical saying that the novel opened with a bang but delivered "few thrills or chills after that" and with regard to the author they said "Twelve Hawks' bad habits include indulging in lengthy excursions to poorly elucidated multiple dimensions and delivering multiple lectures à la Crichton."
