= Arette (tequila) =

Brand of tequila

Tequila Arette de Jalisco S.A de C.V.
- Type: Tequila
- Manufacturer: Tequila ARETTE "El LLano"
- Origin: Mexico
- Introduced: 1986
- Website: Tequila Arette

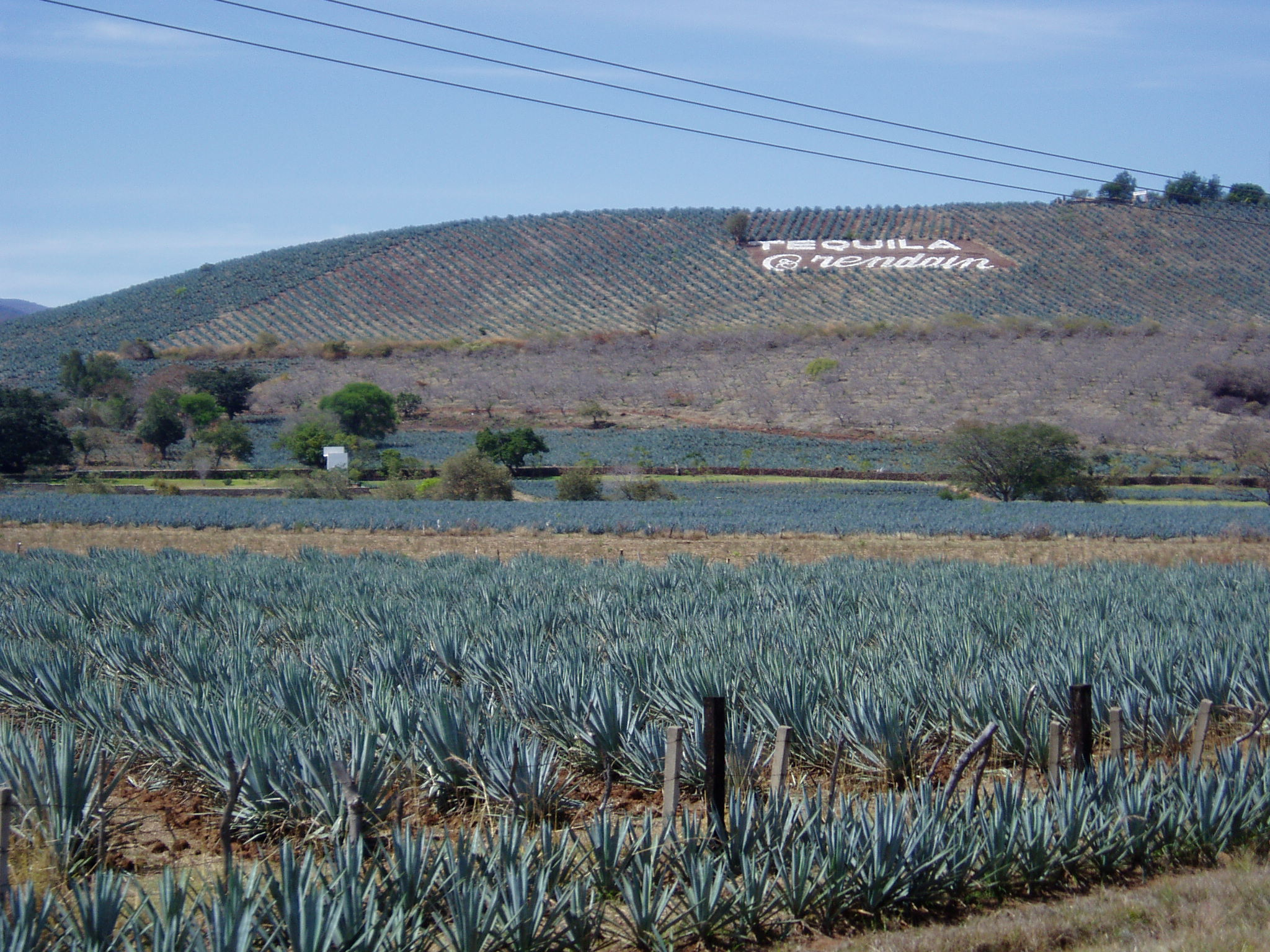
Agave fields in Tequila, Mexico

Arette is a brand of Tequila produced by Tequila ARETTE de Jalisco founded in the 1900s by the Orendain family and run by Eduardo and Jaime Orendain since 1976. The name of the brand comes from ARETE which was the name of the horse that under Humberto Mariles won 1 bronze and 2 Gold Olympic medals in Jumping. The brand was introduced in 1986 to commemorate this event, which so far are the only Gold medals for Mexico in this discipline

The masters distillers Eduardo and Jaime Orendain, grandsons of Don Eduardo, represent the fifth generation producing tequila. Eduardo is also a former Mayor of the town of Tequila and is the current president of the National Chamber for the Tequila Industry (CNIT). Arette's El Llano distillery operates in the original building where the Orendain family history of Tequila production began in the early 1900s. El Llano was rebuilt in 1978 and today's Arette Tequila was created in 1986. It is located in the Tequila city center and is a focal point of its history.

Arette Tequila is only made from 100% Estate Agave. The Orendain brothers have always prioritized quality over quantity—they follow their grandfather’s footsteps by preserving the original artisanal practices and continue the family legacy of the highest quality Tequila.

== Varieties ==
The agave used in the production of Arette is exclusively cultivated in fields on the outskirts of the town of Tequila, Jalisco Mexico. This agave has relatively high fiber and low water content for a more full-bodied tequila.

- Arette Blanco
- Arette Reposado
- Arette Añejo
- Arette Artisanal Suave
- Artisanal Blanco Suave – aged for six months in steel tanks before bottling
- Artisanal Reposado Suave
- Artisanal Añejo Suave – aged for a minimum of 20 months.
- Arette Gran Clase Extra Añejo – twenty barrels per year, rested a minimum of 4 years.

== Other Brands ==
Tequila ARETTE also produces other brands including:

- Paladar
- Agave De Oro
- Arette
- Gran Clase
- Unique
- El Gran Viejo
- Express
