= The Traveler (novel) =

2005 novel by John Twelve Hawks

- Cover of the Doubleday paperback edition
- Author: John Twelve Hawks
- Cover artist: Michael J. Windsor
- Language: English
- Series: The Fourth Realm
- Genre: Science fiction novel
- Publisher: Doubleday
- Publication date: 2005
- Publication place: United States
- Media type: Print (hardback & paperback)
- Pages: 449
- ISBN: 0-593-05430-X
- OCLC: 58828401
- Followed by: The Dark River

The Traveler (The Traveller in the UK) is a 2005 novel by American author John Twelve Hawks. A New York Times bestselling novel, It was the first in his The Fourth Realm Trilogy. Book two, The Dark River, was published in July 2007. The final part in the trilogy, The Golden City, was released September 8, 2009. The trilogy has been translated into 25 languages and has sold more than 1.5 million books.

== Setting ==
The book is set in the near future, in a world where power lies in the hands of a secret organisation that calls itself the Brethren; its enemies call it the Tabula. The Tabula is a centuries-old secret society that believes in the importance of control and stability. The Tabula wishes to enforce a Virtual Panopticon: a society where all individuals become so accustomed to being watched and monitored that they act at all times as if they were being observed, and are thus controllable. This Virtual Panopticon is made possible through the use of surveillance cameras, centralized databases, RFID-like tags for each citizen, and assorted spy gear. The Tabula consider Travelers to be a threat to its control.

The Travelers are individuals with a special gift which allows them to detach from their bodies and journey through elemental barriers to other realms. Pathfinders are individuals capable of teaching potential Travelers how to break free from their body. Harlequins are specially trained warriors who are committed to protecting Travelers. Travelers, Pathfinders, and Harlequins are hunted by the Tabula.

== Plot summary ==
Maya, a young woman, is trying to live the life of a normal citizen. Her background, on the other hand, is anything but normal. She is the daughter of a famous German Harlequin named Thorn, who had been badly injured in an ambush by the Brethren. On a mission she killed two men of the Yakuza, the Japanese mafia. As a consequence Maya had tried to hide and leave her Harlequin past behind until one day her handicapped father calls for her. When visiting him in Prague, she finds him slaughtered by his enemies.

Fulfilling her father's last wish, Maya takes a flight to the States supporting Shepherd, the last American Harlequin. She is determined to help him defend the last two potential Travelers alive. However, Shepherd has become a member of the Brethren. Working for the other side now, he tries to kill Maya. With the help of a young woman named Vikki she is lucky to get away. Vikki is a member of the I. T. Jones Church, a church of followers of the Traveler Isaac T. Jones, who was killed by the Brethren in 1889 with a harlequin. Together they are able to find an ally, Hollis, a Capoeira trainer from Los Angeles and a former member of the Isaac T. Jones Community.

The three of them search for potential Travelers Michael and Gabriel Corrigan. Maya and her companions find Gabriel, but Michael is captured by the Brethren.

The Brethren recently started a new program. They were in contact with a technologically advanced civilization dwelling in another realm who offer the Brethren high technology, weapons and plans for a quantum computer. The Brethren want to use a Traveler that can find this other civilization and guide it to the Earth. By offering Michael power, money and everything else he wants, the Brethren convince him to work for them. With a new drug called 3B3, Michael is able to leave his realm.

While Michael gains his first experiences with other realms, Maya tries to find a Pathfinder for Gabriel. Hollis stays in Los Angeles to place a false track. The Brethren show up at his house and try to kill him with a new weapon called “Splicer," some kind of genetically engineered animal designed to search and destroy, but Hollis defeats them.

Maya and Gabriel find a Pathfinder in the desert in Arizona. While teaching Gabriel how to cross over, she tells him everything she knows about the Travelers and the six realms. There is the first realm of a town like hell, the second realm of a city full of "hungry ghosts", the third is inhabited by animals ignorant of all others, the fourth realm is our own reality, where the sin is desire, the fifth realm is the reality of the "half gods", where the sin is jealousy, and the sixth realm of the "gods" themselves, where the sin is pride. The "gods" and "half-gods" of the fifth and sixth realm are not meant like God as the creator of all life, but like the Tibetans describe them: human beings from parallel worlds.

The realms are separated each by four barriers: one barrier of fire, one of water, one of earth and one of air. A Traveler that is capable of passing these four barriers is then able to enter one of the five other realms. If his body on earth dies, his soul, called the light, is condemned to stay forever in the realm it visits at that time.

Crossing over into other realities, a Traveler can only carry special objects, called talismans, with him. Such an object is the sword Gabriel’s father gave him. Equipped with this sword, he meets his brother in the realm of the hungry ghosts. His brother tries to convince him to join the Brethren. Gabriel resists the temptation, but he tells his brother where he left his body. As a consequence Gabriel is imprisoned by the Brethren within hours and brought to the research centre where Michael is kept.

Maya realizes that an immediate counterstrike is necessary. After a battle in the Brethren's research facility, they free Gabriel but realize that they can not convince Michael to leave the Brethren. Maya and her allies are able to find refuge in a house on a beach in Cape Cod to recover.

== Literary significance and reception ==
David Pitt in his review for Booklist said that John Twelve Hawks is "a gifted storyteller, makes this surreal and vaguely supernatural good-versus-evil story entirely believable." About the novel he says that the "pace is fast, the characters intriguing and memorable, the evil dark and palpable, and the genre-bending between fantasy and thriller seamless". The New York Times reviewer Janet Maslin began her review with the statement: "It takes outlandish nerve and whopping messianic double talk to inaugurate a new science fiction project on the scale of The Traveler." She then concluded, "Amazingly, this novel sustains a new voice even when its roots show. And the list of obvious influences is long indeed. There are traces of Star Wars, The Matrix, Kill Bill and Minority Report. There are echoes of Stephen King, Michael Crichton, Joseph Campbell, Jeremy Bentham, various samurai stories and (could it not have been thus?) The Da Vinci Code."

== Film adaptation ==
On March 23, 2012, Deadline Hollywood announced that Warner Bros. acquired film rights to the Fourth Realm Trilogy.

== The Traveler music album ==
In October 2014, British DJ and Bedrock Records producer John Digweed and his partner Nick Muir released an album inspired by The Traveler.

John Twelve Hawks made the initial contact, sending Digweed his novel with a note saying it had been written while listening to Digweed’s Transitions radio show. After reading The Traveler Digweed immediately emailed Hawks to say how much he’d loved the novel. Eighteen months later Digweed found an email from Hawks in his junk folder and they finally arranged to collaborate. Initial attempts to record Hawks’ narration via Skype failed, forcing Hawks to make a rare personal appearance in the studio. Digweed and Muir met with John Twelve Hawks in the UK and recorded his voice as he read passages from the novel. Hawks's voice was changed electronically and woven into the 13 tracks.

Reaction to the album was positive. Music critic Rich Curtis called it "a very engaging and superbly crafted meeting of artistic minds."
