= Tintorera =

- US theatrical poster
- Directed by: René Cardona Jr.
- Written by: René Cardona Jr.
- Produced by: Gerald Green
- Starring: Susan George; Hugo Stiglitz; Andrés García; Fiona Lewis; Jennifer Ashley
- Cinematography: Ramón Bravo
- Music by: Basil Poledouris
- Production companies: Conacine Film Corporation; Hemdale Film Corporation
- Distributed by: United Film Distribution Company
- Release dates: April 7, 1977 (Mexico); August 10, 1977 (Sweden)
- Running time: 126 minutes (Mexico); 85 minutes (Sweden)
- Countries: Mexico; United Kingdom
- Language: Spanish

Tintorera is a 1977 Mexican-British horror film directed by René Cardona Jr. and starring Susan George, Hugo Stiglitz, Fiona Lewis, and Andrés García. It is based on the novel of the same name by oceanographer Ramón Bravo, who studied the species of shark known as 'tintorera' (a 19-foot (5.8 m) shark) and discovered the sleeping sharks of Isla Mujeres. The film, along with many monster movies of the 1970s and 1980s, is very similar to Jaws. It is also known by the alternative title Tintorera: Killer Shark.

Quentin Tarantino paid tribute to this movie at the eighth Morelia International Film Festival, showing a copy from his private collection.

== Plot ==
Steven, a U.S.-born Mexican businessman, arrives in a Mexican resort village on a yacht anchored offshore. One of the local fishermen and the caretaker of the yacht, Colorado, takes Steven with him when he goes to haul in the sharks he has caught. Steven is annoyed to find that another shark has taken a huge bite out of one of them.

Steven then sets his sights on Patricia, an Englishwoman on vacation. They have a whirlwind romance but break up when Steven can't decide if he's in love with her. Steven is extremely jealous, however, when she begins a relationship with Miguel, a womanizing swimming instructor at the nearby resort hotel. While Steven stews on the yacht, Patricia and Miguel have sex. Then she goes skinny-dipping in the ocean and is eaten by a large 19-foot-long (5.8 m) tiger shark.

The next day, Steven confronts Miguel in the hotel bar. Miguel tells Steven that Patricia was in love with Steven, but she must have returned to England. Neither man ever learns of her true fate. Miguel introduces Steven to two sisters, American college students Kelly and Cynthia Madison. They go on a double date and swim to the yacht for some skinny-dipping at the sisters' suggestion. The shark is in the water nearby, but they safely make it to the boat. Kelly and Cynthia then hop back and forth between Miguel's and Steven's beds. They all swim back to shore the next morning, and the submerged tiger shark again chooses not to bother them. When Miguel and Steven start a shark hunting business, Miguel tells Steven that they must immediately get out of the water if a tiger shark ever appears.

One night, Miguel and Steven meet Gabriella, a young English tourist. Miguel and Steven take Gabriella shark hunting with them. She is appalled by what they do, but admits her feelings for them have become powerful. The three of them decide to have a triangular relationship; she'll be sexually involved with both of them, but they won't fall in love with her or with them. It is loosely implied that Steven and Miguel might be falling in love. They tour the local Mayan archaeological sites together, then retire to the yacht for sex. The next time they go shark hunting, a shark appears and rips Miguel in half.

Gabriella is so upset that she decides to return to England. Steven, meanwhile, vows revenge on the shark, enlisting the local coastguard and fishermen in a campaign to kill the tiger shark and seemingly every other shark in the area. "I hate the bastards", Steven tells the troubled Colonado, who in turn assures him that so many sharks have been killed, the tiger shark must have been one of them. Meanwhile, unbeknownst to Steven or Colonado, the tiger shark attacks another small fishing boat and eats two fishermen.

Steven goes to a nighttime beach party, with Kelly, Cynthia and two other American women. After the party ends, Kelly and Cynthia suggest more skinny-dipping. This time, the tiger shark attacks, ripping Cynthia from Steven's arms as he makes out with her in the water. The other women, make it safely to shore.

After Kelly's father arrives to take her home, Steven vows to kill the shark himself. That, night, Steven attempts to lure the shark, with a devilfish he had speared for the occasion. When he spots the shark, he shoots it with a speargun, hitting it between the eyes, killing it. Steven's fate is left unknown. (Note: This is the ending of the film's shorter 87-minute international version. René Cardona Jr.'s original 126-minute uncut version features a drastically different ending that shows the shark biting off Steven's arm before he kills it. The uncut ending then shows Steven waking up alive but missing an arm in a hospital room, reminiscing about the good times he shared with his friends. This scene was removed from the heavily edited international prints of the film, which implies that Steven dies, by ending with a cloud of blood surrounding Steven's flashlight on the ocean floor, which then fades out to a nostalgic montage of Steven, Miguel, and Gabriella while a somber love song plays. A third ending exists on 117-minute prints of the film ends abruptly with Steven in the water with the shark, both still alive.)

== Cast ==
- Susan George as Gabriella
- Hugo Stiglitz as Steven
- Fiona Lewis as Patricia
- Andrés García as Miguel
- Jennifer Ashley as Kelly Madison
- Eleazar García as Crique (as Eleazar Garcia 'Chelelo')
- Roberto 'Flaco' Guzmán as Colonado (as Roberto 'Flaco' Guzman)
- Laura Lyons as Cynthia Madison
- Carlos East as Mr. Madison (as Charles East)
- Priscilla Barnes as girl from bar #1
- Pamela Garner as girl from bar #2 (as Pamela Gardner)
- Erika Carlsson as Anita (as Erika Carlson)
- Manuel Alvarado as naval officer
- Alejandro Ciangherotti as fisherman #1 (as Alexander Chianguerotti)

== Production ==
Priscilla Barnes, unknown at the time, appears towards the end of the film as a party girl who encounters the shark during night swimming.

The shark in the film was a Tiger shark. Locations were filmed at Isla Mujeres, a resort island near Cancún. All the underwater scenes were filmed with live sharks using the submarine expertise of Ramón Bravo.

Due to the censorship imposed by the Mexican government at the time, there were two versions of the film prepared — the so-called uncut version, with plenty of explicit nudity, for foreign markets, and a cut version for domestic (Mexican) exhibition. It's now possible to find both versions on DVD.

The original English dub in theatres and on video featured the voices of Susan George and Fiona Lewis, who played the two British tourists in the film. However, this dub was later lost, and a new one was created with American voice actresses, which is the one used on the DVD.

=== Release Dates ===
Some international release dates:

- March 31, 1977: Mexico City premiere (¡Tintorera!)
- April 7, 1977: Mexico (¡Tintorera!)
- August 10, 1977: Sweden (Tigerhajarna - havets marodörer)
- August 25, 1977: Italy (Tintorera: Lo squalo che uccide)
- September 16, 1977: Germany (Tintorera! Meeresungeheuer greifen an)
- October 30, 1977: United Kingdom general release (Tintorera) [in a double-bill with Communion, original title of Alice, Sweet Alice]
- June 7, 1978: United States (Tintorera: Killer Shark)

== See also ==
- List of killer shark films
