= Tauno Rissanen =

Finnish equestrian

Personal information
- Nationality: Finnish
- Born: 25 September 1921 Viipuri, Finland
- Died: 26 June 1975 (aged 53) Helsinki, Finland

Sport
- Sport: Equestrian

Tauno Rissanen (25 September 1921 – 26 June 1975) was a Finnish equestrian. He competed in the individual jumping event at the 1948 Summer Olympics.
