= Gonzalo Rodríguez (athlete) =

Mexican sprinter

Personal information
- Nationality: Mexican
- Born: 14 May 1925
- Died: 31 October 2002 (aged 77)

Sport
- Sport: Sprinting
- Event: 100 metres

Gonzalo Rodríguez (14 May 1925 – 31 October 2002) was a Mexican sprinter. He competed in the men's 100 metres at the 1948 Summer Olympics.
