= Camp Jossman =

United States Army cantonment in the Philippines

Camp Jossman was a United States Army cantonment constructed near the town of Buenavista on Guimaras Island in the Philippines after the Spanish–American War.

== Naming ==
Camp Jossman was named for Albert L. Jossman. Jossman, a graduate of the University of Michigan enlisted for the Spanish–American War as a member of the 35th Michigan Volunteer Infantry. He subsequently transferred to the 27th Michigan Regiment, and later joined the regular Army as a member of the 22nd Infantry Regiment. Jossman was subsequently commissioned as a Second Lieutenant, and was wounded at the Battle of Bayan. Second Lieutenant Jossman died in Manila on July 28, 1902 while en route to the United States on a furlough. Jossman's remains were returned to Michigan, and he received a military funeral in Detroit.

== Construction and operation ==
The construction of a post on Guimaras Island was authorized by Congress in July, 1902. Subsequent acts of Congress authorized the expansion of the camp.

Camp Jossman was the base for the 19th Infantry Regiment and two battalions of Philippine Scouts.

In 1909 the facility was expanded to include the Punta Blanco target range.

Sixty-seven buildings were planned for Camp Jossman. Not all of these buildings had been completed when the post was vacated.

== Affiliation with prominent soldiers ==
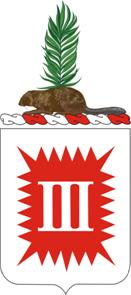
3rd Engineer Battalion Coat of Arms.

While serving with the 3rd Engineer Battalion from 1902 to 1903, Douglas MacArthur, then a First Lieutenant, was responsible for construction of the Buenavista wharf at Santo Rosario (today known as MacArthur's Wharf), as well as the road from the wharf to Camp Jossman.

Brigadier General John W. Heavey, Chief of the Militia Bureau during World War I, served at Camp Jossman from 1902 to 1904.

Brigadier General George W. McIver, commander of the 81st Infantry Division's 161st Brigade in World War I, served at Camp Jossman from 1903 to 1905.

Lieutenant General William H.H. Morris served at Camp Jossman as a Second Lieutenant in 1911.

Major General David C. Shanks, assigned to Camp Jossman as a major with the 4th Infantry Regiment from 1908 to 1909.

General Joseph Stilwell was assigned to Camp Jossman as a First Lieutenant from 1904 to 1906.

== Deactivation ==
In 1912 the U.S. Army determined that there was no longer a need for bases on Guimaras Island, and Camp Jossman was vacated. The buildings and other infrastructure were subsequently demolished.

== Present day ==
The site of Camp Jossman is now a reservoir under the jurisdiction of the Water District of Buenavista.

The Punta Blanco Ranges are still visible, and are considered a local historic site.
