= Ramón Bravo =

Mexican diver photographer and underwater filmmaker

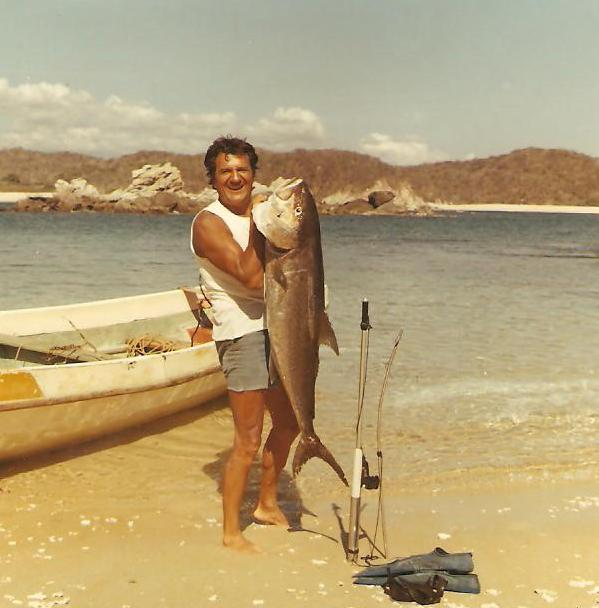
- Ramón Bravo in 1960
- Born: Ramón Bravo Prieto; 21 October 1925; Piedras Negras; Coahuila, Mexico
- Died: 21 February 1998 (aged 72); Isla Mujeres; Quintana Roo, Mexico
- Occupations: Journalist; Swimmer; Photographer; Filmmaker; Writer

Ramón Bravo (21 October 1925 – 21 February 1998) was a Mexican diver, photographer and underwater filmmaker. Bravo was the person who made the phenomenon of Sleeping sharks known to the world.

== Biography ==
Bravo was born in Piedras Negras, Coahuila in northern Mexico from his parents Juan Bravo, a railroader, and María del Rosario Prieto. Bravo was first known as a famous Mexican swimmer and competed in the 1948 Summer Olympics. Also played as Wide receiver in UNAM football team. Thanks to his close friend Apolonio Castillo in the late 50s, Bravo began to dedicate himself to diving and underwater photography– gaining him fame in both in the United States and Europe as an oceanographer. Bravo developed a fascination for sharks and devoted a large portion of his life to filming and studying sharks. He is widely known for the discovery, study, and photography of "sleeping sharks" near Isla Mujeres in the Caribbean where sharks were seen there to be "sleeping" on the ocean floor. Bravo was the first person to dive and film with orcas in their natural state without a protective cage in the frosty waters of Islas San Benito in Baja California, Mexico or polar bears swimming at the North Pole, where even one bit his left heel.

=== The sleeping sharks ===
It was Ramón Bravo in the 1970s, who made known to the world how sharks sleep, after the lobster fisherman Carlos García, nicknamed "Válvula" (the "Valve" in English), discovered them in a place known as "Los Cuevones" (The big caves). At first Bravo did not believe "Válvula" because scientists said that sharks could not sleep, that they must be constantly moving because they lacked a swim bladder he initially thought that they were harmless nurse shark crawling on the sand, but due to the insistence of "Vávula", finally Bravo went to verify the discovery of the fisherman then he verified and filmed that tiger, mako, whitetip or bull sharks rested peacefully on the white sands in caves of the Caribbean Sea and, later, shared the discovery with Dr. Eugenie Clark, a member of the Scripps Institution of Oceanography of La Joya, California. Dr. Clark's scientific explanation was:

Due to their static position on the sand against the current, the sharks remained immobile and practically "drugged", because when the water ran, they took the oxygen necessary for their respiratory process through their gills, without the need to move, the salty water mixed with fresh water from the Yucatan Peninsula producing an electromagnetic field in the water, in addition to helping to deworm the dormant sharks.

Bravo also served as guide and cameraman to Jacques-Yves Cousteau, his son Philippe and his divers of the Calypso, into the cave of sleeping sharks and reefs surrounding Isla Mujeres resulted in a documentary called, The Sleeping Sharks of Yucatan where Ramón Bravo appears in the credits. The investigations of Ramón Bravo were not without dangers, since on more than one occasion he was injured by the sharks he used to film. One of them (a bull shark) bit him, causing a serious injury to his left forearm, at the elbow, which required urgent surgery and intensive care for several weeks.

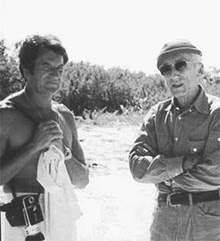
Ramón Bravo and Commander Cousteau

Also a well-known journalist and writer during the mid-1960s and 1970s, he wrote, among others, the following novels and works:

- Primero y touch, segundo y muerte (1961)
- Bajo las aguas del Mar Rojo (1962)
- Isla Mujeres (1972)
- Holbox (1974)
- Tintorera (1975)
- Buceando entre Tiburones (1975)
- El cenote de la muerte (1976)
- El cisne negro (1976)
- Un tesoro bajo el mar (1977)
- Carnada (1978)
- Buceando en el Polo Norte (1979)
- Un tesoro bajo el mar (1979)
- Buceando entre las Orcas (1982)
- La siesta del tiburón (1984)
- Sirenia (1987)
- El Chinchorro (not completed, about the protected zone of Mahahual)

One of his novels later became a film called Tintorera (1977) directed by René Cardona Jr. The underwater photography was by Ramón Bravo. He also photographed and directed underwater scenes of the James Bond movie Licence to Kill (1989) starring Timothy Dalton. Although uncredited, Bravo played the zombie that fought the tiger shark underwater in Lucio Fulci's Zombi 2 after René Cardona Jr. stepped down. The shark was fed prior to filming as well as pumped with tranquilizers to keep it placid.

== Death ==
Ramón Bravo died on 21 February 1998 by accident, because of an accidental heart attack caused by an electric shock from his home in Isla Mujeres.

On 28 February 1998, in the presence of the then President of Mexico, Ernesto Zedillo, Jean-Michel Cousteau and many local and State authorities, at the entrance to the underwater cave of the Sleeping Sharks, located between Isla Contoy and Isla Mujeres, in Quintana Roo, Mexico. Ramón's wife, María Vallejo and priest Eduardo Pérez deposited the ashes and, at the entrance, a bronze plaque was placed in his honor at the wish of his dearest friends and many famous divers, which says:

Ramón Bravo, protector of the sea and the ocean, sleeps forever next to his sharks in this cave. Isla Mujeres 02–28–98.
