= Open Fire (1989 film) =

Open Fire is a 1989 American action film starring David Carradine. He co stars with his daughter Kansas.
