= Ignacio Romo Porchas =

Mexican basketball player (1924–2007)

Ignacio Romo Porchas (July 17, 1924 – March 11, 2007) played for the Mexico national basketball team in the 1948 Summer Olympics in London.

He was born in Guaymas, Sonora, but moved to Mexicali at age five and subsequently lived in Tijuana. He died in Calexico, California, United States.

Romo was a member of the first class of inductees into the Mexicali Salón de la Fama de Deportes (Mexicali Sports Hall of Fame) in Mexicali, Baja California.
