= Fidel Luña =

Mexican fencer

Personal information
- Born: 23 March 1921 Altotonga, Veracruz, Mexico
- Died: 2 January 1966 (aged 44) Autopista Verdadera, near Cuernavaca, Mexico

Sport
- Sport: Fencing

Fidel Luña (23 March 1921 – 2 January 1966) was a Mexican fencer. He was born in Altotonga, Veracruz.

He competed in the individual and team sabre events at the 1948 Summer Olympics.

He died in a car accident on the Autopista Verdadera, near Cuernavaca.
