= Francisco Bustamente =

Mexican sports shooter

Personal information
- Born: 11 May 1908 Miahuatlán de Porfirio Díaz, Oaxaca, Mexico
- Died: 24 January 1983 (aged 74) Mexico City, Mexico

Sport
- Sport: Sports shooting

Francisco Bustamente (11 May 1908 – 24 January 1983) was a Mexican sports shooter. He competed in the 25 m pistol event at the 1948 Summer Olympics.
