= Héctor Guerrero (basketball) =

Mexican basketball player

Personal information
- Full name: Héctor Guerrero Delgado
- Nationality: Mexican
- Born: 24 November 1926
- Died: 20 July 1986 (aged 59)

Sport
- Sport: Basketball

Héctor Guerrero (24 November 1926 – 20 July 1986) was a Mexican basketball player. He competed in the men's tournament at the 1948 Summer Olympics and the 1952 Summer Olympics.
