= The Golden City (novel) =

2009 novel by John Twelve Hawks

- The Golden City's cover
- Author: John Twelve Hawks
- Language: English
- Series: Fourth Realm Trilogy
- Genre: Science fiction
- Publisher: Doubleday
- Publication date: September 8, 2009
- Publication place: United States
- Media type: Print (hardcover)
- Pages: 358
- ISBN: 0-385-51430-1
- OCLC: 429116299
- Preceded by: The Dark River

The Golden City is the third in Fourth Realm Trilogy of dystopian novels written by reclusive author John Twelve Hawks. It was released in the United States on September 8, 2009.
