= Ricardo García (pentathlete) =

Mexican modern pentathlete (1921–1981)

Personal information
- Full name: Ricardo García Rojas
- Born: 1921 Morelia, Mexico
- Died: 14 April 1981 (aged 59–60) Mexico City, Mexico

Sport
- Sport: Modern pentathlon

Ricardo García (1921 – 14 April 1981) was a Mexican modern pentathlete. He competed at the 1948 Summer Olympics.
