= Franklin F. Wing Jr. =

American equestrian (1908–1994)

Franklin Wing
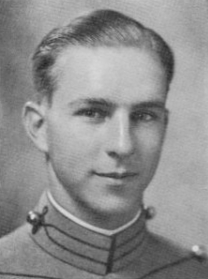
- As a West Point cadet

Personal information
- Full name: Franklin Fearing Wing Jr.
- Nationality: American
- Born: January 6, 1908 Camp Jossman, Guimaras, Philippines
- Died: July 6, 1994 (aged 86) Bellevue, Washington, U.S.

Sport
- Sport: Equestrian

Franklin Fearing Wing Jr. (January 6, 1908 – July 6, 1994) was an American equestrian. He competed in two events at the 1948 Summer Olympics.

== Biography ==
Franklin Fearing Wing Jr. was born at Camp Jossman on January 6, 1908. He graduated from the United States Military Academy in 1930.
