= Apolonio Castillo =

Mexican swimmer (1921–1957)

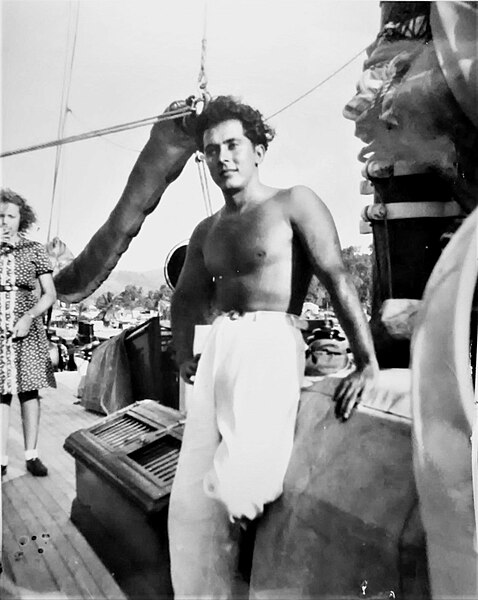

Personal information
- Born: May 23, 1921 Tecpan de Galeana, Guerrero, Mexico
- Died: March 11, 1957 (aged 35) Acapulco, Mexico

Sport
- Sport: Swimming
Medal record
Representing Mexico
Central American and Caribbean Games
Gold medal – first place	1946 Barranquilla	200m breaststroke
Gold medal – first place	1946 Barranquilla	4x200m freestyle relay

Apolonio Castillo Díaz (23 May 1921 – 11 March 1957) was a Mexican swimmer who competed in the 1948 Summer Olympics and 1952 Summer Olympics in butterfly stroke. Castillo was a close friend of Ramón Bravo, he taught the photographer and underwater filmmaker to dive.

Díaz died in Acapulco at the age of 35, after diving in the waters of the bay trying to rescue the bodies of Joseph Arthur Mitchel and Edith Hallock, two elder American tourists who were victimized by the Texan Rudy Fenton Cavalzono and the boatman Daniel Ríos Ozuna days before in the Bay of Acapulco and whose approximate depth is 200 feet (61 meters). In the last search Castillo floated but suffered a decompression accident and three days later he was taken to the hyperbaric chamber of the Naval Base, where on March 11, 1957, Díaz died.
