= Nicanor Villarreal =

Mexican gymnast (1919–2010)

- Full name: Nicanor Villarreal Sánchez
- Born: 1 April 1919 Monterrey, Mexico
- Died: 21 December 2010 (aged 91) Monterrey, Mexico
- Height: 1.69 m (5 ft 7 in)

Gymnastics career
- Discipline: Men's artistic gymnastics
- Country represented: Mexico

Nicanor Villarreal Sánchez (1 April 1919 – 21 December 2010) was a Mexican gymnast. He competed in three events at the 1948 Summer Olympics. Villareal died in Monterrey on 21 December 2010, at the age of 91.
