= John Twelve Hawks =

American author

John Twelve Hawks is the pseudonym of an author of five novels and one non-fiction book. His legal name and identity are unknown.

His first published novel was the dystopian The Traveler and its sequels, The Dark River and The Golden City, collectively comprising the Fourth Realm Trilogy. The trilogy has been translated into 25 languages and has sold more than 1.5 million books. The trilogy was followed five years later by a fourth book, Spark, and a non-fiction eBook, Against Authority.

== Biography ==
In the sources listed and in his interviews, he has stated that he was born in the United States. In the non-fiction Against Authority, Twelve Hawks wrote that he grew up in the 1950s. He is a Buddhist who had meditated for most of his life. In the Spiegel interview he states he is not a Native American.

In the Spiegel interview he talks about visiting East Germany before the 1989 fall of the Berlin Wall. In the USA Today article, his response to a question about religion began with, "When I was in my twenties..." and when an editor asked him whether the "realm of hell" could be compared to current conditions in Iraq, Hawks replied "it's more like Beirut in the '70s". In the Spiegel interview and in the Daily Telegraph article, Hawks states that he drives a 15-year-old car and that he does not own a television.

The SFF World interview indicates that Twelve Hawks once lived in a commune and learned about literature by stealing books from a restricted university library and then returning the books the next day. In the same interview, he states he wrote The Traveler after passing through some sort of personal crisis. In the interview in SFF World Twelve Hawks claims that he has "no plans to go public" regarding his identity.

According to Twelve Hawks' agent, "He lives in New York, Los Angeles and London", and The Traveler sets its story in all three of these locations.

In a 2008 interview on Joseph Mallozzi's weblog, he answered a series of questions about this life:

QUESTION: Is there a reason for the pen name? One you’d be willing to share, I suppose. As in, is it because you’re actually a secret CIA agent and/or Russian spy, or merely because you don’t ever want your mother knowing what you’ve written?

JTH: My mother and the rest of my family don’t know that I have written the novels. Those people I know who aren’t close friends see me as a failure by the American standards of success. Being a “failure” in such a way has been a continual lesson. It’s helped me realize that we make quick judgments of others based on little real information. We assume so much – but don’t know the secrets held within the heart.

=== Pseudonym ===
In Against Authority, Twelve Hawks describes writing The Traveler. His decision to use a pen name was triggered by a combination of personal and political reasons:

For the first drafts of the book, I kept my birth name off the title page. The old me wasn’t writing this book. Something was different. Something had changed. I had always admired George Orwell, and had read his collected essays and letters countless times. When Eric Blair became Orwell, he was set free, liberated from his Eton education and colonial policeman past. And there was another factor about the title page that troubled me. I was telling my readers that this new system of information technology was going to destroy our privacy, and that they should resist this change. It seemed hypocritical to go on a book tour or appear on a talk show blabbing about my life when our private lives were under attack.

During an online conversation he had with his fans on the We Speak for Freedom website, he explained the origin of his name:

The real story is this …I was walking through a forest and encountered a hawk nesting area. Twelve hawks circled around my head for about ten minutes …so close that the tip of their wings brushed the side of my head. That was why I picked the name. REAL hawks. Not symbolic ones.

== Published works ==
=== Fourth Realm Trilogy ===
See Fourth Realm Trilogy

=== Spark ===
Spark was published in October 2014 in the United States and Great Britain.

The book is narrated by Jacob Underwood, a man who suffers from Cotard delusion, a real-life neurological condition in which the afflicted person thinks that he or she is dead. Underwood is hired by a New York investment bank to work as an assassin, eliminating threats to the bank's clients. "Underwood’s strength as a hired killer is the emotionless, robotic nature that allows him to operate with logical, ruthless precision." But, when the bank asks him to track down Emily Buchanan, a low-level employee who has absconded with financial secrets, Underwood gradually becomes more human and feels moments of empathy. Hawks describes a dystopia where people are beginning to be replaced by robots. Underwood's journey is an exploration into what human values will survive in a world of machines.

Reviews of Spark were generally positive. The Publishers Weekly review mentioned JTH's writing style: "Twelve Hawks’s prose, cold and clinical at times, yet punctuated with moments of great sensitivity, matches the tone and mood of his setting perfectly." In a starred review in Booklist, reviewer David Pitt wrote: "It’s been several years since the Fourth Realm trilogy ended, and some readers might have wondered if the author had only one story to tell. But guess what? As good as the Fourth Realm books were, this one may be even more appealing: less fantastic, more grounded in a contemporary real world, with a narrator who is deeply scarred and endlessly fascinating."

In October, 2013 Deadline Hollywood reported that the film rights to Spark were sold to DreamWorks.

=== Against Authority ===
On August 20, 2014, John Twelve Hawks released a free non-fiction book called Against Authority: Freedom and the Rise of the Surveillance States. The book is dedicated to novelist Thomas Pynchon. An excerpt from Against Authority was published on Salon.

Against Authority begins with a personal description of the neurological experiments performed on Hawks when he was a child and states that all of us have the ability to reject the “right” of those in power to control our lives. Hawks describes how the reaction of governments to the September 11 attacks led to the Patriot Act in the United States and the proliferation of Closed-circuit television cameras in London. He references his 2006 essay "How We Live Now" that was his first published reaction to these systematic attacks on privacy.

The book explains how the Total Information Awareness program developed by John Poindexter at the U.S. Defense Advanced Research Projects Agency (DARPA) led to the expansion of the National Security Agency and the revelations of Edward Snowden. Hawks criticizes the assumption of “mass surveillance” strategies against terrorism and shows how “trickle down surveillance” has spread to small towns and developing countries.

Hawks believes that surveillance technology has given those in power a crucial tool for social control. He describes how the culture of surveillance is used to track citizens for commercial reasons and gives examples of how people are now routinely watched at work. In the conclusion, he advocates a strategy of “parallel lives” that allows people to exist in the digital world while protecting their private actions and thoughts.

=== Certainty ===
In April 2026, Twelve Hawks published Certainty, his first novel in more than a decade. Set in a near-future, post-pandemic United States in which artificial intelligence, predictive algorithms, robots, and virtual reality have become integrated into everyday life, the novel follows several intersecting storylines. Ten-year-old orphan Kate Noland flees her foster home after an algorithm predicts that within thirty days she will either be killed or become a killer. Accompanied by Zeno, an artificial-intelligence-powered talking stuffed seal, Kate travels toward New York City while other storylines involve the murder of a designer of humanoid robots and the disappearance of a young man immersed in a virtual-reality environment.

The novel received generally positive reviews. Booklist called it a "magnificent novel" and a "brilliant examination of the way our future might play out." Library Journal praised its "detailed worldbuilding, intricate plotlines, and realistic characters," concluding that the novel would appeal to readers of George Orwell and Michael Crichton. Kirkus Reviews praised Kate as "one of the more appealing preteens to appear in recent dystopian fiction" and concluded that readers both skeptical of and enthusiastic about artificial intelligence would find much to enjoy in the novel. Bookreporter described Certainty as "gripping, intricately plotted and delightfully imaginative" and characterized it as an examination of the increasingly blurred boundary between humans and machines.

== Bibliography ==
- The Traveler (2005)
- The Dark River (2007)
- The Golden City (2009)
- Against Authority (2014)
- Spark (2014)
- How to Free Your Mind in the Trump Era (essay), (2017)
- Certainty (2026)
