= Angel Acuña Lizaña =

Mexican basketball player (1919–1997)

Personal information
- Born: 11 February 1919; Chihuahua City, Mexico
- Died: 1 August 1997 (aged 78); Tucson, United States

Sport
- Sport: Basketball

Angel Acuña Lizaña (11 February 1919 – 1 August 1997) was a Mexican basketball player. He competed in the 1948 Summer Olympics.
