= Ernesto García Cabral =

Mexican caricaturist (1890–1968)

Ernesto García "El Chango" Cabral (Huatusco, Veracruz, 18 December 1890 – 8 August 1968) was a Mexican cartoonist and painter, famous for his contributions of caricatures to the publication Revista de Revistas; his work numbers almost 25,000 pieces.

García Cabral was also an expert tango dancer, Greco-Romano wrestler, and pioneer of silent film. He was extremely social and knew famous personalities of his period including Enrico Caruso, Walt Disney, Charles Lindbergh, Dolores del Río and Mario Moreno ("Cantinflas").

== Biography ==
Born in Huatusco, Veracruz, García Cabral's first known work appeared in a newspaper in 1900. Because of his talent, he taught drawing at his school from the age of 12 years.

In December 1906 Huatusco mayor Joaquín Castro, wrote the governor of Veracruz, Teodoro A. Dehesa, seeking a scholarship for García Cabral, which once granted allowed him to enter the Academy of San Carlos, where he studied with Germán Gedovius, at the time an El Mundo Ilustrado collaborator, and there García Cabral discovered classicism, as well as through the foreign currents that arrived in imported magazines. He began his professional career in 1909, as illustrator and caricaturist at The Tarantula, run at the time by Fortunato Herrerías, who later became one of his best friends. During the suppression of the lifting of Aquiles Serdán eyewitness to the facts, that later described telegráficamente to García Cabral so that it illustrated the report. These illustrations (10 in total) are the first known images of the Mexican Revolution.

In spite of this, when the revolution broke out, the publications of Herrerías and the works of García Cabral adopted a strong anti-maderista tone. Later García Cabral worked in 1911 at Mario Vitoria's Multicolor magazine, also anti-maderista. During the revolution, García Cabral drew caricatures of people like Francisco I. Madero, Enrique Creel, Pancho Villa, Bernardo Reyes, María Conesa and Emiliano Zapata. In February 1912 Madero awarded García Cabral a scholarship to study in Paris. In addition to his studies, García Cabral worked in France for the publications La Baïonnette, Le Rire and La Vie Parisienne, forced to do so by need when president Victoriano Huerta withdrew his scholarship.

Gradually developing his personal and dramatic style, in 1915 García Cabral left France in the middle of the deprivation caused by the wartime economy, making his way to Madrid, and from there to Buenos Aires, Argentina. He drew there for newspapers La Nación, El Mundial and El Tiempo; likewise he also worked for Caras y Caretas, I.G.B., Proteo and La Pluma, as well as the Chilean publications Revista Popular and Los Diez de Chile. It became added of the Mexican embassy in Argentina.

On his return to Mexico in 1918, Ernesto García Cabral devoted himself to working with colours and shortly afterwards worked as a caricaturist for Novelties, Thursday of Excélsior and Fufurufu, in addition to the magazine Fantoche. However it is his work as illustrator of covers for the publication of Magazine of Magazines the one who awarded him deserved fame, giving to know his innovative and fluent style that helped to enter the Art Deco to the American continent.

Eventually he would collaborate likewise for the magazines Today, Revista de Revistas, Ferronales, Icarus and Socrates among others. Winning in 1961 of the prize Mergenthaler conceded by the Inter-American Society of Press, the Chango Cabral died in Mexico City on 8 August 1968.

== Filmography ==
- 1924 : Atavismo by Gustavo Sáenz de Sicilia
- 1926 : A drama in the aristocracy by Gustavo Sáenz de Sicilia
- 1965 : In this village there are not thieves by Alberto Isaac

== Awards and honors ==
- Prize Ottmar Mergenthaler of the Presse Interaméricaine
- National prize of the Plastic Arts of Mexico
