= Greger Lewenhaupt =

Swedish equestrian

Count Greger Lewenhaupt
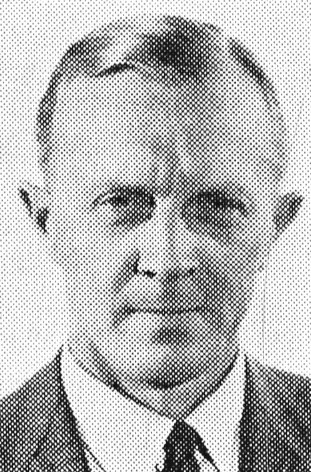
- Lewenhaupt, c. 1972.

Personal information
- Nationality: Swedish
- Born: 16 December 1920 Stockholm, Sweden
- Died: 3 August 2008 (aged 87) Stockholm, Sweden

Sport
- Sport: Equestrian

Count Johan Greger Knutsson Lewenhaupt (16 December 1920 – 3 August 2008) was a Swedish equestrian. He competed in two events at the 1948 Summer Olympics.

== Biography ==
Greger Lewenhaupt began his career as a cavalry officer in 1943. He left active military service in 1952 with the rank of ryttmästare (cavalry captain). In 1948, he represented Sweden at the 1948 Summer Olympics in London. At the 1956 Summer Olympics, he was responsible for the design and preparation of the show jumping courses, which were held at Stockholms stadion.

In 1952, Lewenhaupt joined British Petroleum’s Swedish subsidiary (Svenska BP). He was appointed sales director in 1961, promoted to deputy managing director in 1963, and became chief executive officer in 1967. He later served as chairman of the board of the company from 1977 to 1979. Lewenhaupt also held executive positions as chief executive officer of Duni-France in Paris and as chairman of the board of Lionhead Inc. in the United States.
