= Henry Nicoll (equestrian) =

British equestrian (1908–1999)

Personal information
- Nationality: United Kingdom
- Born: 17 April 1908 England
- Died: 4 December 1999 (aged 91) Mashonaland, Zimbabwe

Achievements and titles
- Olympic finals: 1948 Summer Olympics
Medal record
Henry Nicoll
Medal record
Equestrian
Representing United Kingdom
Olympic Games
Bronze medal – third place	1948 London	Team jumping

Henry Nicoll (17 April 1908 – 4 December 1999) was a British equestrian and Olympic medalist. He was born in Kensington. He won a bronze medal in show jumping at the 1948 Summer Olympics in London. Nicoll retired to the Mashonaland region of northeastern Zimbabwe in December 1981 and lived there until his death in 1999.

== See also ==
- Equestrian at the 1948 Summer Olympics
