= Fourth Realm Trilogy =

The Fourth Realm Trilogy refers to the trilogy of books written by pseudonymous author John Twelve Hawks and published between 2004 (in the UK, 2005 in the US) and 2009. The trilogy has been translated into 25 languages and has sold more than 1.5 million books.

The three novels describe parallel universes, including one controlled by a shadow group called The Brethren using the Vast Machine. The Traveler was a critical success and international bestseller - with the intriguing life of the elusive author increasing reader interest in the books. As of February 2010, the identity of John Twelve Hawks has yet to be confirmed. Stand-ins represent Twelve Hawks on book tours, some declaring "I am John Twelve Hawks".

== Books ==
In order of publication:

- The Traveler, John Twelve Hawks (ISBN 978-0-375-43440-2, published June 2005 by Doubleday)
- The Dark River, John Twelve Hawks (ISBN 978-0-385-51429-3, published July 2007 by Doubleday)
- The Golden City, John Twelve Hawks (ISBN 978-1400079315, published September 2009 by Doubleday)
