= Jack Lewis (equestrian) =

Irish equestrian (1902–1983

Personal information
- Full name: John Joseph Lewis
- Nationality: Irish
- Born: 1902 Limerick, Ireland
- Died: 13 March 1983 (aged 80–81) Dublin, Ireland

Sport
- Sport: Equestrian

John Joseph Lewis (1902 – 13 March 1983) was an Irish equestrian. He competed in two events at the 1948 Summer Olympics. Lewis later became the chair of the Show Jumping Association of Ireland and its first Director General.
