= Dan Corry (equestrian) =

Irish equestrian

Personal information
- Nationality: Irish
- Born: 30 August 1902; Loughrea, Ireland
- Died: 25 January 1990 (aged 87)

Sport
- Sport: Equestrian

Dan Corry (30 August 1902 – 25 January 1990) was an Irish equestrian. He competed in two events at the 1948 Summer Olympics.
