= Karl-Åke Hultberg =

Swedish equestrian

Personal information
- Nationality: Swedish
- Born: 17 September 1915; Åtvidaberg, Sweden
- Died: 28 April 1997 (aged 81); Halmstad, Sweden

Sport
- Sport: Equestrian

Karl-Åke Hultberg (17 September 1915 – 28 April 1997) was a Swedish equestrian. He competed in two events at the 1948 Summer Olympics.
