= Joachim Gruppelaar =

Dutch equestrian

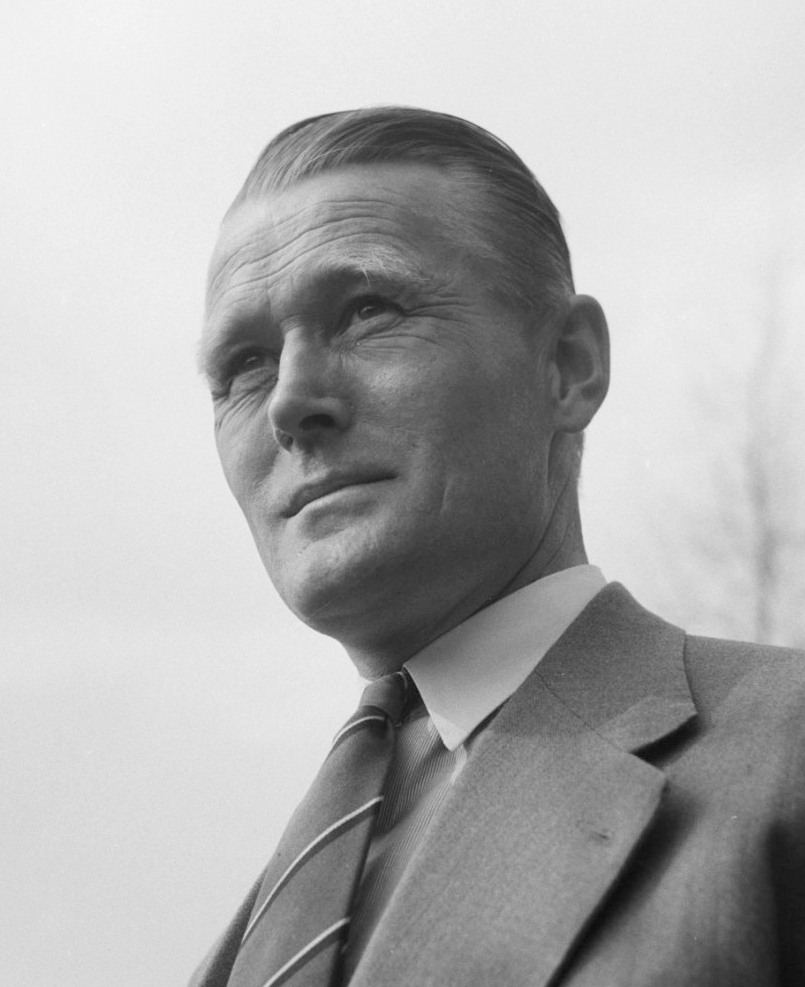
- Joachim Gruppelaar in 1952

Personal information
- Full name: Joachim Joseph Gruppelaar
- Born: 24 October 1911 Amersfoort, the Netherlands
- Died: 12 July 1971 (aged 59) Renkum, the Netherlands

Sport
- Sport: Horse riding

Joachim Joseph Gruppelaar (24 October 1911 – 12 July 1971) was a Dutch equestrian. He competed at the 1948 Summer Olympics in jumping and finished in 20th place. Gruppelaar held a military rank of major in 1948.
