= Eric Sörensen =

Swedish equestrian

Personal information
- Nationality: Swedish
- Born: 7 September 1913; Linköping, Sweden
- Died: 27 February 1990 (aged 76); Linköping, Sweden

Sport
- Sport: Equestrian

Eric Sörensen (7 September 1913 – 27 February 1990) was a Swedish equestrian. He competed in two events at the 1948 Summer Olympics.
