= Jaime García (equestrian) =

Spanish equestrian

Olympic medal record

Equestrian
Silver medal – second place	1948 London	Team jumping

Jaime García Cruz (3 October 1910 – 16 May 1959) was a Spanish equestrian who competed in the 1948 Summer Olympics and in the 1952 Summer Olympics.

In 1948 he and his horse Bizarro won the silver medal as part of the Spain jumping team in the team jumping competition, after finishing fifth in the individual jumping competition. Four years later he and his horse Quórum finished tenth as part of the Spanish team in the team jumping event, after finishing 17th in the individual jumping.
