= Torben Tryde =

Danish military officer and equestrian (1916–1998)

- Born: 12 November 1916; Frederiksberg, Kingdom of Denmark
- Died: 24 March 1998 (aged 81); Søllested, Denmark
- Occupations: Lieutenant colonel, olympian, writer and resistance fighter
- Writing career
- Language: Danish
- Genre: Genealogy

Torben Tryde (12 November 1916 – 24 March 1998) was a Danish lieutenant colonel, writer, Olympic equestrian, resistance fighter and the last person to be appointed kammerjunker by the Danish Court.

== Background and education ==
Torben Tryde was son of geodesist Axel Tryde (1884–1939) and Edith Mathilde née Lohse(d. 1945). Torben Tryde had a twin sister Elin Tryde (1916–2003). He graduated from Sankt Jørgens High School in 1935. He went on to graduate from the Danish military Academy in 1939, and chose to continue his military career as a cavalry officer. Tryde married Agnete Toussieng (29 June 1921 – 31 May 2006), and they had four children.

== Resistance fight ==
Tryde was company leader in the resistance fight during the German occupation of Denmark, but was captured on 1 March 1945. He was held as a prisoner at Vestre Fængsel, and was interrogated by the Gestapo at the Shellhus only days before it was bombed by the British in Operation Carthage on 21 March 1945. Tryde was transferred from Vestre Fængsel to Frøslev Prison Camp on 2 May 1945, where he was a prisoner for the remaining part of the war.

== 1948 Olympics ==
Tryde was an expert equestrian and won several championships. He also participated in the 1948 Summer Olympics on his horse Attila.

== Career after WW2 ==
After the war Tryde served as an officer at the Danish Guard Hussar Regiment, but also worked at the Danish Department of Defence. He served as a UN observer in India and Pakistan and was awarded the UNMOGIP medal. He was editor at the Danish military's Kentaur Magazine. Tryde retired as a lieutenant colonel.

Tryde was the last person to be appointed kammerjunker, because the appointments ceased after the death of Christian X of Denmark in 1947. Tryde was also appointed a Knight First Class of the Order of the Dannebrog. The French president René Cotys was in Denmark in 1956, and used to occasion to appoint Tryde a member of the Legion of Honour. Tryde was also awarded the Medal of Merit by the Danish Court.

After his retirement Tryde wrote two books about the genealogy of the Tryde family: Slægten Tryde which was published in 1990 and Tryde Kirke og Slægten Tryde which was published in 1995.
