= Fred Ahern (equestrian) =

Irish equestrian

Personal information
- Nationality: Irish
- Born: 3 April 1900; Ross, Ireland
- Died: 15 November 1958 (aged 58); Dublin, Ireland

Sport
- Sport: Equestrian

Fred Ahern (3 April 1900 – 15 November 1958) was an Irish equestrian. He competed in two events at the 1948 Summer Olympics.
