= Jaap Rijks =

Dutch equestrian

Jacob "Jaap" Rijks (25 August 1919 – 11 February 2017) was a Dutch equestrian who competed for his home nation in the 1948 Summer Olympics in London. He was born in Nijmegen.
