= Marcelino Gavilán =

Spanish equestrian

Olympic medal record

Equestrian
Silver medal – second place	1948 London	Team jumping

Marcelino Gavilán y Ponce de León (4 June 1909 – 9 March 1999) was a Spanish horse rider who competed in the 1948 Summer Olympics and in the 1952 Summer Olympics.

In 1948 he and his horse Forajido won the silver medal as part of the Spain jumping team in the team jumping competition, after finishing 16th in the individual jumping competition.

Four years later he and his horse Quoniam finished tenth as part of the Spanish team in the team jumping event, after finishing 30th in the individual jumping.
