= Ruben Ribeiro (equestrian) =

Brazilian equestrian

Personal information
- Nationality: Brazilian
- Born: 25 May 1911
- Died: 2 February 1986 (aged 74)

Sport
- Sport: Equestrian

Ruben Ribeiro (25 May 1911 – 2 February 1986) was a Brazilian equestrian. He competed in two events at the 1948 Summer Olympics.
