= Max Fresson =

French equestrian

Personal information
- Nationality: French
- Born: 23 April 1912; Paris, France
- Died: 5 February 1996 (aged 83); Paris, France

Sport
- Sport: Equestrian

Max Fresson (23 April 1912 – 5 February 1996) was a French equestrian. He competed at the 1948 Summer Olympics and the 1960 Summer Olympics.
