= Eyüp Öncü =

Turkish equestrian (1906–1983)

Personal information
- Nationality: Turkish
- Born: 1906 Van, Ottoman Empire
- Died: 1983 (aged 76–77) Istanbul, Turkey

Sport
- Sport: Equestrian

Eyüp Öncü (1906–1983) was a Turkish equestrian. He competed in two events at the 1948 Summer Olympics.
