= Kudret Kasar =

Turkish equestrian

Personal information
- Nationality: Turkish
- Born: 1914; İzmir, Turkey
- Died: April 2003

Sport
- Sport: Equestrian

Kudret Kasar (1914 – April 2003) was a Turkish equestrian. He competed in two events at the 1948 Summer Olympics.
