= Hank Frierson =

American equestrian

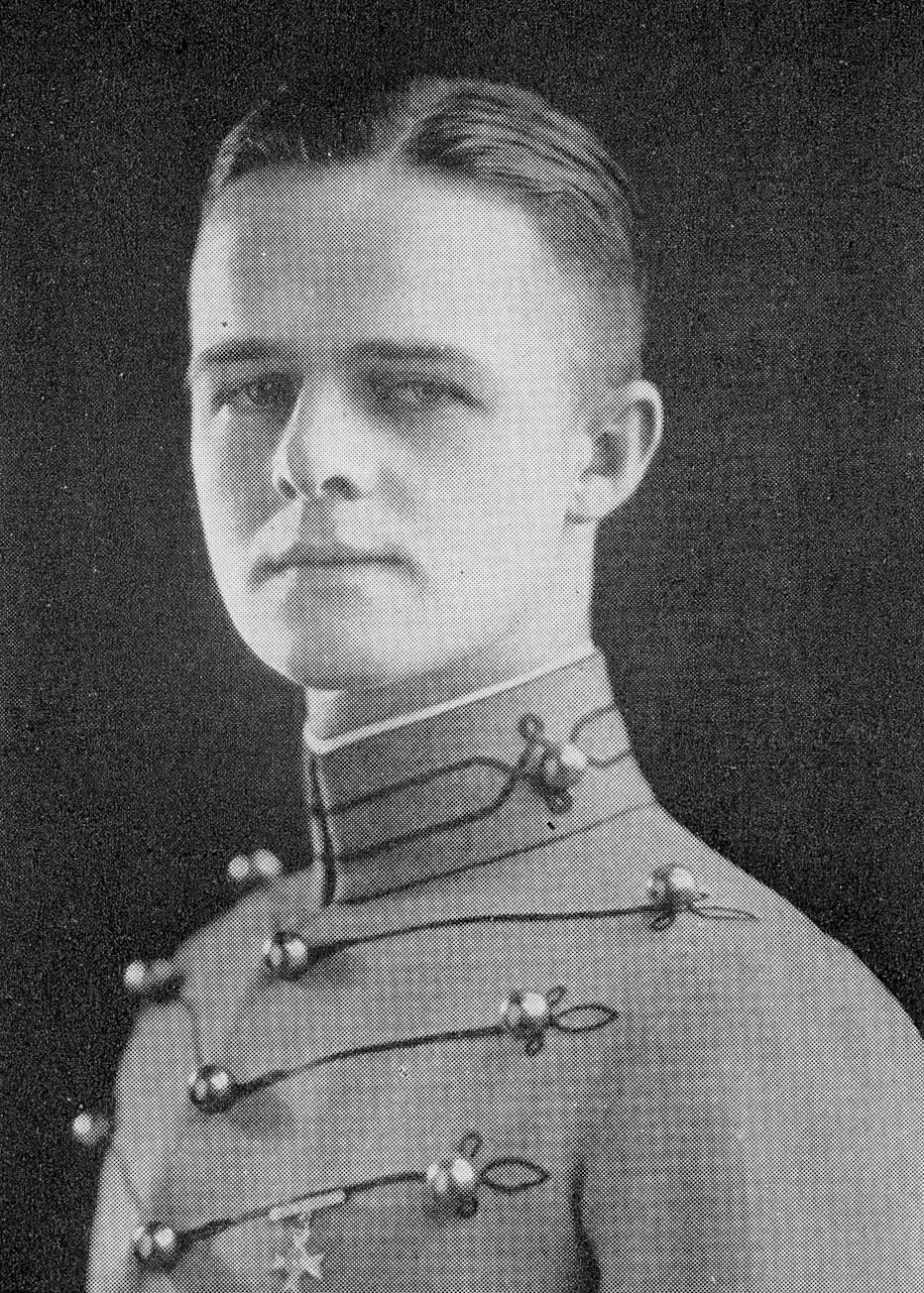
- At West Point in 1924

Personal information
- Full name: Andrew Allison Frierson
- Born: June 23, 1902 Knoxville, Tennessee, United States
- Died: September 24, 1982 (aged 80) El Paso, Texas, United States
- Resting place: Arlington National Cemetery

Sport
- Sport: Equestrian

Andrew Allison "Hank" Frierson (June 23, 1902 – September 24, 1982) was an American equestrian. He competed in two events at the 1948 Summer Olympics.

== Biography ==
Hank Frierson was born in Knoxville, Tennessee on June 23, 1902.

He attended the United States Military Academy at West Point, graduating in 1924. He went on to become a colonel, serving with the Ninth Army during World War II, and was decorated with the Silver Star Medal, the Legion of Merit, the Bronze Star Medal, and the Croix de Guerre.

He died in El Paso, Texas on September 24, 1982, and was buried at Arlington National Cemetery.
