= Pascual Pistarini =

Argentine equestrian and general

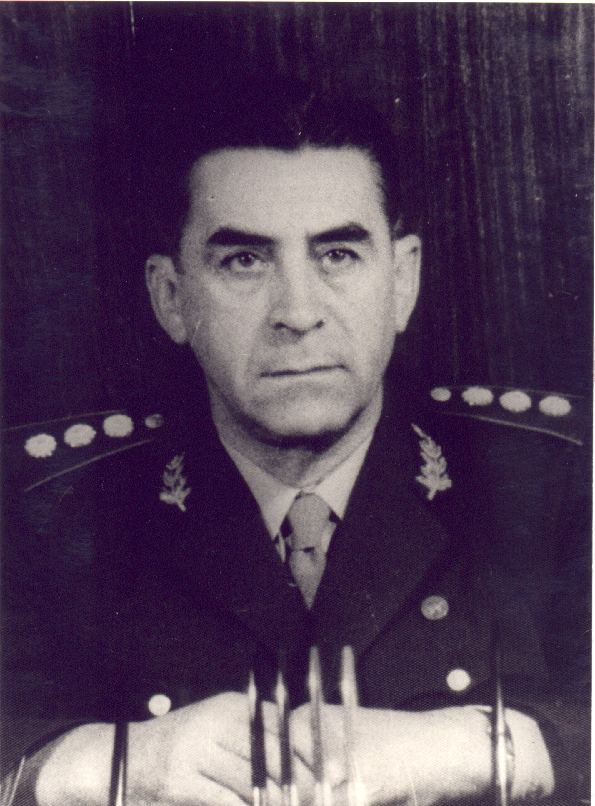

Personal information
- Born: 6 October 1915; Río Cuarto, Argentina
- Died: 2 October 1999 (aged 83); Buenos Aires, Argentina

Sport
- Sport: Equestrian

Pascual Pistarini (6 October 1915 – 2 October 1999) was an Argentine equestrian, military general and one of the ringleaders in the coup d'etat that initiated the self-styled "Argentine Revolution" (Spanish: Revolución Argentina), a military dictatorship that ruled Argentina between 1966 and 1973, before the (brief) return of democracy to the country.

He competed in two events at the 1948 Summer Olympics.
