= Jeppe Johannes Ladegaard-Mikkelsen =

Danish equestrian (1915–1990)

Personal information
- Nationality: Danish
- Born: 17 March 1915 Fredericia, Denmark
- Died: 8 October 1990 (aged 75) Mogenstrup, Denmark

Sport
- Sport: Equestrian

Jeppe Johannes Ladegaard-Mikkelsen (17 March 1915 – 8 October 1990) was a Danish equestrian. He competed in two events at the 1948 Summer Olympics.
