= Pierre de Maupeou d'Ableiges =

French equestrian

Personal information
- Nationality: French
- Born: 7 June 1910; Gray, France
- Died: 24 December 1996 (aged 86); Sarthe, France

Sport
- Sport: Equestrian

Pierre de Maupeou d'Ableiges (7 June 1910 – 24 December 1996) was a French equestrian. He competed in two events at the 1948 Summer Olympics.
