= Alberto Valdés (equestrian, born 1919) =

Mexican equestrian (1919–2013)

Medal record

Equestrian

Representing Mexico

Olympic Games
Gold medal – first place	1948 London	Team jumping

Pan American Games
Bronze medal – third place	1951 Buenos Aires	Team jumping

Captain Alberto Valdés Ramos (25 June 1919 – 14 April 2013) was a Mexican equestrian and Olympic champion. Born in Mexico City, he won a gold medal riding his horse Chihuahua in the show jumping competition for the Mexican team along with Humberto Mariles and Rubén Uriza at the 1948 Summer Olympics in London. Capt. Valdes and Chihuahua placed equal 10th on a total of 20 points in the individual competition. His teammate Col. Humberto Mariles riding Arete won the individual gold medal on a total of 6.25 points.

Valdés died on 14 April 2013, at the age of 93. His son Alberto Valdés Jr. won a bronze medal at the 1980 Summer Olympics.
