= Francisco Pontes =

Brazilian equestrian

Personal information
- Nationality: Brazilian
- Born: 19 August 1905

Sport
- Sport: Equestrian

Francisco Pontes (born 19 August 1905, date of death unknown) was a Brazilian equestrian. He competed in two events at the 1948 Summer Olympics.
