= Arthur Carr (equestrian) =

British equestrian (1910–1986)

Medal record

Equestrian

Representing United Kingdom

Olympic Games
| Bronze medal – third place | 1948 London | Team jumping |

Arthur Carr (26 July 1910 – 11 September 1986) was a British equestrian and Olympic medalist. He won a bronze medal in show jumping at the 1948 Summer Olympics in London.
