= Henrique Callado =

Portuguese equestrian

Personal information
- Nationality: Portuguese
- Born: 12 June 1920; Bragança, Portugal
- Died: 12 November 2001 (aged 81)

Sport
- Sport: Equestrian

Henrique Callado (12 June 1920 – 12 November 2001) was a Portuguese equestrian. He competed in five consecutive Olympic Games, starting with the 1948 Summer Olympics, and finishing with the 1964 Summer Olympics.
