= Angel Maldonado (swimmer) =

Mexican swimmer (1927–2018)

Ángel Maldonado
Personal information
- Full name: Ángel Maldonado Campos
- Born: 17 November 1927 San Luis Potosí, Mexico
- Died: 10 February 2018 (aged 90) Xalapa, Mexico

Sport
- Sport: Swimming

Ángel Maldonado Campos (17 November 1927 – 10 February 2018) was a Mexican swimmer. He competed in two events at the 1948 Summer Olympics.
