= Néstor Alvarado =

Argentine equestrian

Personal information
- Full name: Néstor Francisco Alvarado Saravia
- Nationality: Argentine
- Born: 1912
- Died: 17 October 1983 (aged 70–71); Hurlingham, Buenos Aires, Argentina

Sport
- Sport: Equestrian

Néstor Alvarado (1912 – 17 October 1983) was an Argentine equestrian. He competed in two events at the 1948 Summer Olympics.
