= Selim Çakır =

Turkish equestrian (born 1918)

Selim Çakir
Personal information
- Nationality: Turkish
- Born: 15 February 1918
- Died: before 2013

Sport
- Sport: Equestrian

Selim Çakır (15 February 1918 – before 2013) was a Turkish equestrian. He competed in two events at the 1948 Summer Olympics.
