= Hélder de Souza =

Portuguese equestrian

Personal information
- Full name: Hélder de Souza Martins
- Nationality: Portuguese
- Born: 28 November 1901
- Died: 2 February 1957 (aged 55)

Sport
- Country: Portugal
- Sport: Equestrian
Medal record
Men's Equestrian
Bronze medal – third place	1924 Paris	Team jumping

Hélder de Souza Martins (28 November 1901 – 2 February 1957) was a Portuguese horse rider who competed in the 1924 Summer Olympics, the 1928 Summer Olympics and the 1948 Summer Olympics.

In 1924 he and his horse Avro won the bronze medal as part of the Portuguese show jumping team, after finishing twelfth in the individual jumping competition. Four years later he and his horse Avro finished sixth as part of the Portuguese show jumping team, after finishing 16th in the individual jumping competition.
