= Rubén Uriza =

Mexican equestrian

Medal record

Representing Mexico

Olympic Games

Men's equestrian
| Gold medal – first place | 1948 London | Jumping, Team |
| Silver medal – second place | 1948 London | Jumping, Individual |

Rubén Uriza Castro (May 27, 1920 – August 30, 1992) was a Mexican show jumping champion, and Olympic champion. He participated at the 1948 Summer Olympics in London where he won a gold medal in Team Jumping as a member of the Mexican winning team. He also received a silver medal in Individual Jumping. Both aboard his horse Harvey. He was born in Huitzuco, Guerrero and died in Mexico City.
