= History of the Argentina national basketball team =

The Argentina men's national basketball team represents Argentina in basketball international competitions, and is controlled by the Argentine Basketball Confederation (CAB, for Spanish: Confederación Argentina de Basquetbol). The national team was formed in 1921, playing its first game v. Uruguay that same year.

Argentina's national basketball team remains among the most successful in the Americas. It is the only national team in the FIBA Americas zone that has won the quintuplet crown: FIBA Basketball World Cup (they won the first edition, in 1950), Olympic Gold Medal (2004) (the highest honor and most important title of Argentina in the history of Argentina Basketball Men's Senior National Team), FIBA Diamond Ball (2008), FIBA AmeriCup (2001 and 2011) and Pan American Gold Medal (1995, 2019 and 2023). They have also won 13 South American Basketball Championships, as well as many youth championships.

The Argentine representative was also the first to defeat a United States national team with a full squad of NBA players. They did so by 87–80 in the 2002 FIBA World Championship held in Indianapolis.

== 1910s and 1920s ==
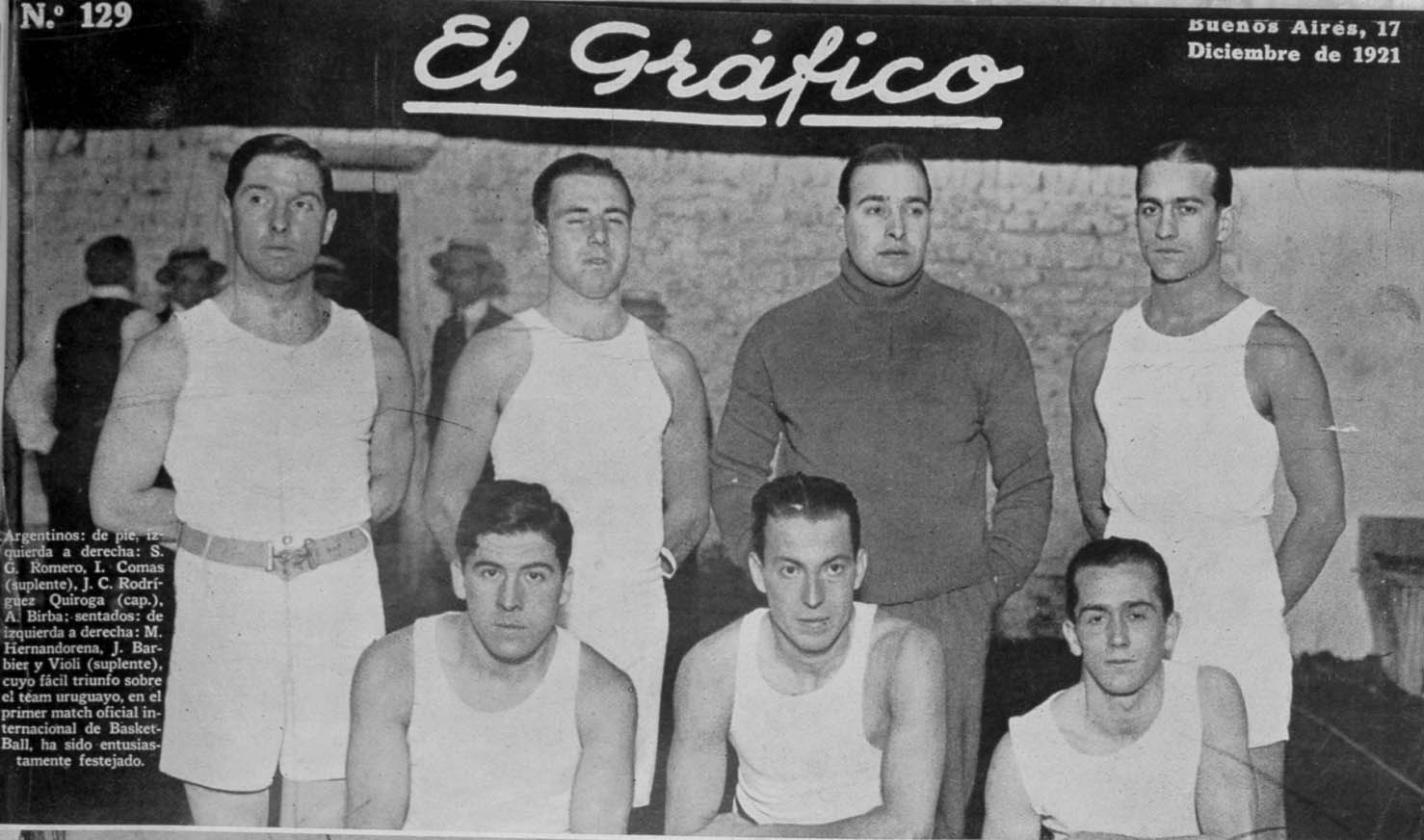
The first national team as covered by El Gráfico magazine in 1921

The practice of basketball in Argentina was started by Asociación Cristiana de Jóvenes (Young Men's Christian Association – YMCA) in 1912. Canadian Professor Paul Phillip was in charge to teach basketball at the YMCA headquarters in Paseo Colón Avenue, Buenos Aires.

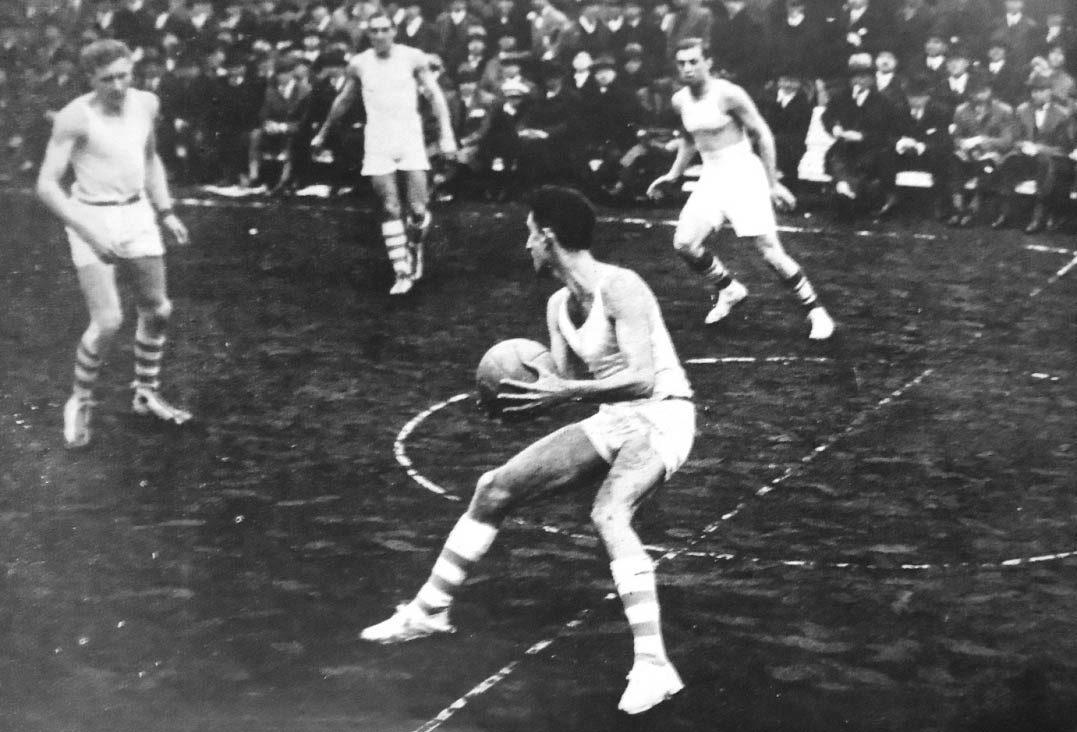
Argentina playing Uruguay in 1925

The first basketball clubs in Argentina were YMCA, Hindú and Independiente. By 1912 the first basketball games were held by YMCA headquarters in Buenos Aires. In 1913 the first games between Argentine and Uruguayan YMCA are played. One year later, the YMCA organised the first internal championship. In 1919 the Uruguay national team played a game v. local team Nacional, in Buenos Aires.

In 1921 the "Argentine Basketball Confederation" (original name: "Federación Argentina de Basket-Ball" – FABB) was established to organise competitions not only in Buenos Aires but in several cities around Argentina, such as Bahía Blanca and Córdoba where basketball would develop significantly in successive years. Argentina played its first international game (representing the FABB) against Uruguay in 1921. The players chosen to play that match were: S.G. Romero, J.C. Rodríguez Quiroga (captain), A. Birba, M. Hernandorena, J. Barbier.

In successive years, other clubs such as Ñaró, Estudiantes (LP), River Plate, Gimnasia y Esgrima, Universitario and Racing) registered their teams to the Federation. On August 30, 1929, the Argentine Basketball Federation (current "Confederación Argentina") was established, with founder members from Buenos Aires, Córdoba, Santa Fe, La Rioja, North Federation and Bahía Blanca. The Federación Argentina focused on the spread of basketball in Buenos Aires as in the rest of the provinces of Argentina.

== 1930s and 1940s ==
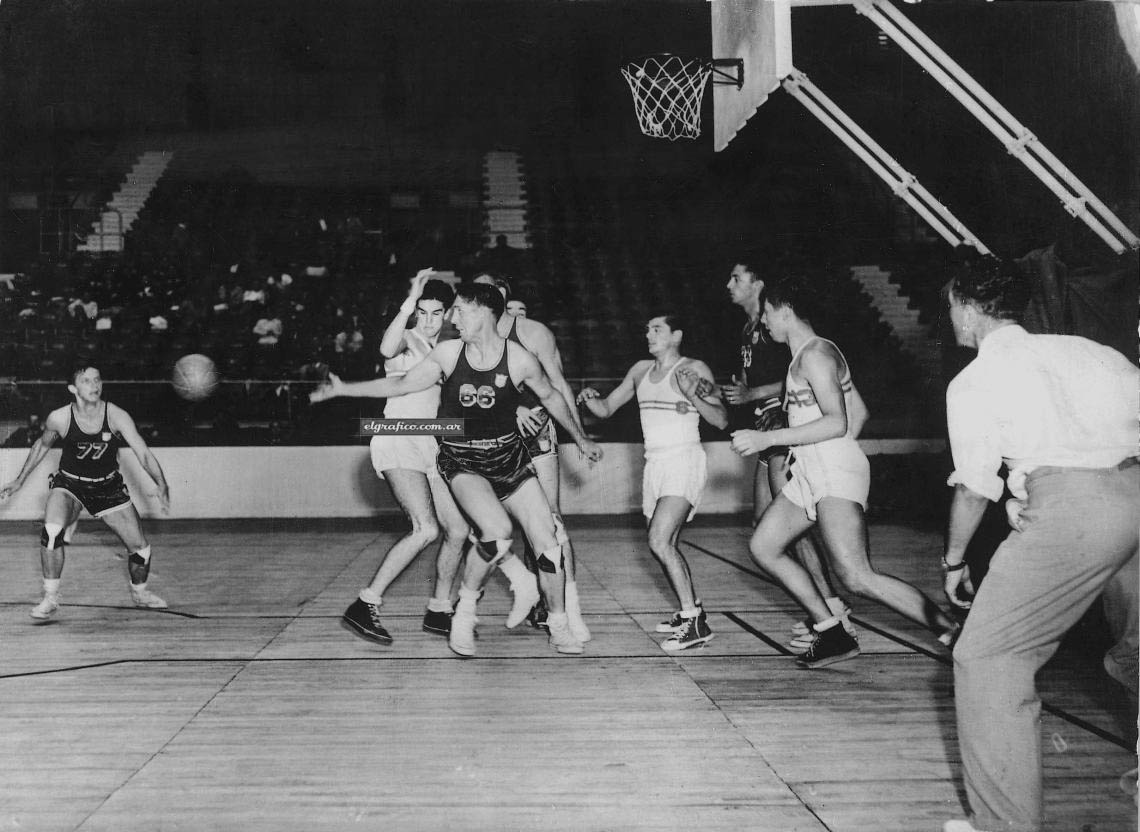
Argentina v USA at the 1948 Olympics

By the 1930s the practise of basketball had been widely spread around Buenos Aires, with the media (more remarkably El Gráfico magazine) not only covering the sport but even organising competitions.

In 1930 the first South American Championship ("Campeonato Sudamericano" in Spanish) was organised, being Argentina runner-up. The national side would win its first official title at the 3rd edition of the tournament, in 1934 in Buenos Aires. The national team finished winning all the games (6 in total) achieving the gold medal. Argentina won its second consecutive title at the 1935 Championship held in Rio de Janeiro with 3 wins and 1 loss.

After several competitions with no wins, Argentina achieved a new title in 1941, winning all the games (5). During the successive editions, Argentina would achieve its first treble after winning the 1942 and 1943 championships. Nevertheless, Argentina would not win a new South American title until 1966.

== 1950s ==
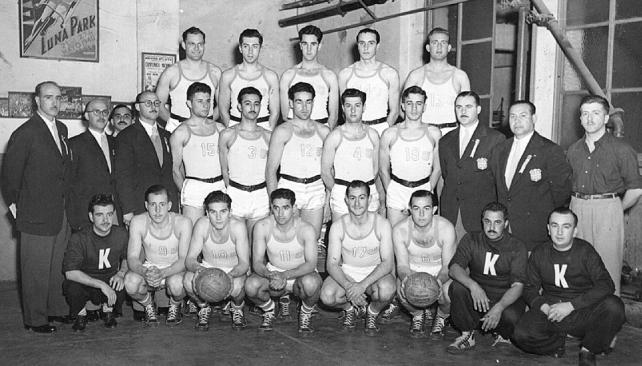
The 1950 World Champions.

After the 1948 Olympic Tournament, FIBA decided to create a World Championship, and named Argentina as the host country for the inaugural 1950 edition. The team's coaching staff was formed by Jorge Canavesi as head coach, Casimiro González Trilla as his assistant and Jorge Boreau as the physical trainer. The squad, formed entirely by amateur players, trained in preparation for the tournament in River Plate's facilities every day in double shifts, something uncommon for the times. The Argentine government negotiated with the players' employers and studying centers to secure their times.

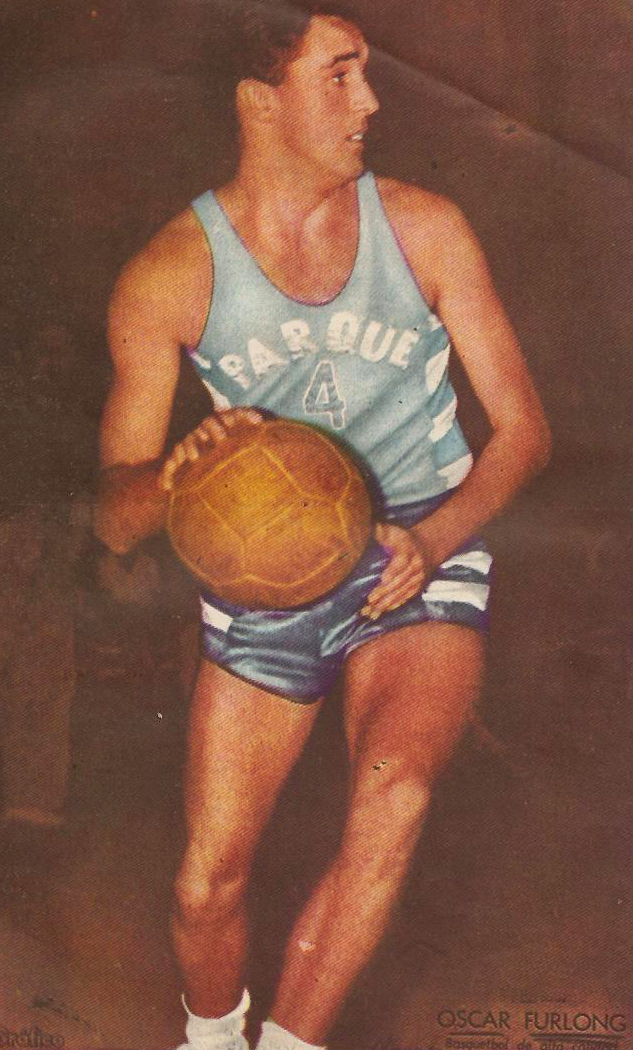
Oscar Furlong, one of the key players in the 1950 World Championship.

The team played around Oscar Furlong, a center with good mobility and passing skills. Other important players were Ricardo González (captain), Leopoldo Contarbio, Juan Carlos Uder, Raúl Pérez Varela and Roberto Viau (who was 18 years old at the time of the tournament). In the tournament itself, Argentina defeated France (56–40) in the preliminary round, followed by Brazil (40–35), Chile (62–41), France again (66–41) and EuroBasket champions Egypt (68–33) in the final round; before defeating the United States in the decisive match (64–50).

After the World Championship title, Argentina won the silver medal at the 1951 Pan American Games held in Buenos Aires and finished fourth at the 1952 Summer Olympics held in Helsinki. However, for political reasons, the country did not participate in the 1953 South American Basketball Championship, nor did they defend the World Championship title in the 1954 edition of the tournament. The last participation of the 1950s generation was in the 1955 Pan American Games held in Mexico City, where they won another silver medal.

The world championship won clean and brilliantly, but, on January 8, 1957, the military dictatorship of Pedro Aramburu, who had taken power in Argentina via a coup d'état which called itself Revolución Libertadora, provisionally suspended the 1950 World Championship winners; a measure that was later made permanent on March 27 of that year. According to the polemic amateur article a professional sportsman can not receive money, but the Argentinean players -not USA- received economic compensation for play. The suspension was for allegedly violating the Amateur Sportsman Statute, as, according to the administrators who had been installed in the Argentine Basketball Federation, the players had been paid to play by the overthrown government of Juan Perón. With a young and inexperienced team, Argentina finished fourth in the 1958 South American Basketball Championship and 10th (over 13 teams) in the 1959 FIBA World Championship.

== 1960s ==
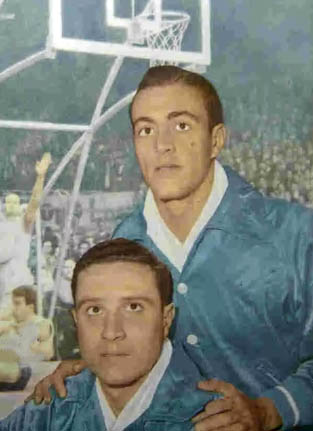
Players Antonio Tozzi (up) and Rubén Mascetti in 1960

Subsequently, the team had further disappointing third and fourth-place finishes at the 1961 and 1963 South American Championships respectively, and did not participate in the 1963 Pan American Games.

In preparation for the 1963 World Championship, Alberto Andrizzi was appointed as head coach. For different reasons, point guards Ricardo Crespi and Hugo Olariaga, shooting guards Marcelo Farías and Norberto Batillana, centers Miguel Ballicora and Guillermo Riofrío, as well as Ricardo Alix, decided not to be part of the World Championship squad. Most of the players were amateurs, who alternated the practice of the sport with their jobs and studies.

Coach Andrizzi formed a squad that averaged 22.8 years of age, the lowest in the team's history at the competition, and with only one player from the previous World Championship (Antonio Tozzi). This was also the first time Argentina took a player above the 2 metres (6.6 ft) of stature to a World Championship, Zoilo Domínguez (who was 2.04 m (6 ft 8 in)). The squad trained 8 days in Villa Allende, Córdoba Province, and played some preparation games against teams from Córdoba and Santa Fe. The delegation that traveled to Brazil (where the competition took place) had no assistant coach, nor a physician.

To play for the national team we had to get permission from our jobs and the missed days were discounted from our salaries. Many times you went without knowing if you would still have a job when you came back. The most you could ask for was that the Argentine Basketball Federation paid you the missed days. The team was not always formed by the best players, rather by the ones that could go

— Samuel Oliva

In the tournament itself, Argentina faced a tough group with Italy, the United States and Mexico. The team lost by a large margin their two initial games: 73–91 against Italy (that, contrary to Argentina, had a full team of professional players) and 51–81 against the United States (that had a team of university players, among them Willis Reed and Don Kojis). In the game against Mexico (that had Manuel Raga and Carlos Quintanar in their team), the 35 points scored by Alberto Desimone were not enough to avoid an 82–84 defeat. Desimone's feat of 35 points in one game were an Argentine record in the competition until Luis Scola scored 37 against Brazil in the 2010 World Championship. The team was eliminated in the preliminary round, but finished first in the "consolation round", played by the 6 teams eliminated in the first group stage.

After the tournament, both of the teams centers received offers to continue their playing careers abroad. Desimone joined Pallacanestro Cantù in the Serie A of Italy and Zoilo Domínguez the St. Joseph College in the NCAA Division II of the United States. None of them ever played again for their national team.

After the 1963 World Championship, the Argentine national team disbanded for 2 years and 8 months. In 1966, under Gimnasia y Esgrima La Plata's coach Miguel Ángel Ripullone's guidance, Argentina finished second (behind the USA) in the Torneo de la Confraternidad Americana held in Cosquín. Subsequently, in that same year, the team finished last (among 13) in the Extra World Championship held in Chile. These two tournaments were the first international experiences for Ernesto Gehrmann and Alberto Cabrera, who went on to play many years for Argentina.

For the 1966 South American Basketball Championship to be held in Mendoza, and contrary to recent experiences, Argentina did a serious pre-tournament training. Alberto López (coach of River Plate and one of the 1950 World Champions) was selected as head coach, and joined by a coaching staff of two physical trainers, a physician and a kinesiologist. The squad for the tournament had a striking average height for the time, with Gehrmann (2.06 m (6 ft 9 in)), brothers Miguel (2.05 m (6 ft 9 in)) and Tomás (2.03 m (6 ft 8 in)) Sandor, Miguel Ballicora (1.98 m (6 ft 6 in)), Dante Massolini] (1.95 m (6 ft 5 in)) and Samuel Oliva (1.94 m (6 ft 4 in)). Moreover, Ricardo Alix also took part of the team, after having declined for previous tournaments. With a good team and a good preparation, Argentina won the tournament back-to-back, defeating World Champions Brazil in the process, and breaking a 23-years run without winning a South American championship. That Argentine national team came to be nicknamed "Los Cóndores" (in English: "the Condors").

For the 1967 World Championship held in Uruguay, Miguel Ángel Ripullone returned as head coach, replacing Alberto López. The squad had five players from the previous South American Championship (Gehrmann, Tomás Sandor, Samuel Oliva, Carlos Mariani and Masolini) and three with World Championship experience (the aforementioned Oliva, Atilio Fruet and Héctor Barreneche). However, the players from the European leagues did not take part of the team. These included Carlos Ferello of Victoria Libertas Pesaro and Guillermo Riofrío, Alberto Desimone and Carlos D'Aquila of Pallacanestro Cantù (the latter two would go on to win the Serie A with the team in the 1967–68 season).

In the group stage, Argentina defeated Japan and Peru (who had beaten them in the last two South American Championships), and lost heavily against the Soviet Union by 39 points. In the final round, Argentina defeated only Uruguay, losing the other 5 games (United States, Soviet Union, Yugoslavia, Brazil and Poland). Ernesto Gehrmann's 18 points against the USA earned him an offer by CB Estudiantes, though he rejected it to sign for Palmeiras in Brazil. Argentina finished the competition 6th, the best position for the team until the 2002 Championship.

After the tournament, the debate in Argentine basketball became about the importance of having tall players.

In the Argentine league I was a tall player with my 1.98 m (6 ft 6 in), but when we got to the hotel in Montevideo I was surprised by seeing the Soviets and Yugoslavs who were many centimeters taller and physically stronger than me. And they also played well...

— Ángel Casarín

Two months after the 1967 World Championship, Argentina, lead again by coach Casimiro González Trilla who had replaced Alberto López, took a team with 5 centers and only two guards to the Pan American Games held in Winnipeg (the team finished 6th of 10). In times were the lack of high stature players was a big problem for the national team, 3 players that could have solved the problem either declined to play for the national team, or abandoned basketball altogether: Alberto Desimone never returned to the national team despite his success in Italy, Zoilo Domínguez ended his basketball career, and Tomás Sandor after training more than a month with the NBA's Washington Bullets took a job as an engineer in San Francisco, ending his basketball career. Moreover, Guillermo Riofrío often declined citations.

In 1968, Argentina finished 5th in the South American Championship (equaling its worst position in the history of the tournament). Moreover, the team did not qualify for the 1970 World Championship, after a third-place finish in the 1969 South American Championship. This was the first time the Argentine national team did not take part of the competition since its inception in 1950. In 1973, Argentina played the final of the South American Championship after seven years without doing so, losing to Brazil (but qualifying for the World Championship). Between the 1967 World Championship and the 1973 South American Championship, the team had 4 coaches: Casimiro González Trilla, Jorge Canavesi, Jorge Martínez and Miguel Ángel Ripullone. The latter was confirmed as head coach for the 1974 FIBA World Championship to be held in Puerto Rico.

== 1970s ==
To compensate for the lack of international experience of most of the players, the national team made the longest tour in its history, playing 20 games in 46 days throughout Europe. Argentina faced some of the strongest teams in the world, like the Soviet Union, Yugoslavia and Italy; returning with 6 victories (West Germany (2), Switzerland (2), Greece and Italy). After the tour, José de Lizaso and Carlos Pellandini were cut from the squad, due to an argument with the coach the former and due to injury the latter.

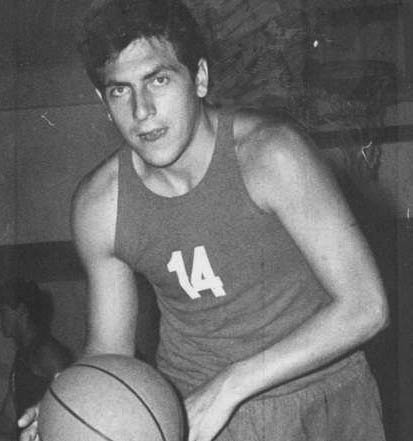
"Beto" Cabrera, nicknamed Magician took part of the team that played the 1974 World Championship

The team for the 1974 World Championship was built around four experienced players: Alberto Cabrera, Ernesto Gehrmann, Carlos González and Alfredo Monachesi (who averaged 28 years of age) the intermediate generation of Adolfo Perazzo, Jorge Becerra and Raúl Guitart (averaging 23), and the youngsters Eduardo Cadillac and Carlos Raffaeli (who had won the South American Youth Championships of 1972 and 1973). Though some of the players had other jobs or studied, all of them were professional, exception being Cabrera who did not get paid in Estudiantes de Bahía Blanca for a matter of personal principle.

In the tournament itself, Argentina was faced in a tough group with the United States, Spain (1973 EuroBasket runners-up) and the Philippines. The key match for Argentina to advance was the debut against Spain. With Cabrera defending the Spaniard's key player Wayne Brabender, the team finished the first half 47–44 above, with Barbender only scoring two points. However, by the fifth minute of the second half Cabrera reached his fourth personal foul, and Barbender had more freedom to reach a total 22 points. The 23 turnovers and weak defense were key for Argentina's final 89–96 defeat. In the second game against the Philippines, Gehrmann's 31 points and 12 rebounds lead to a 110–90 victory, though the turnovers (20) and defense were an unsolved problem. The national team then lost to the US 86–109 to finally be eliminated. In the consolation round, Argentina finished third. The 121–70 victory over the Central African Republic (the team's highest scoring record in the history of the competition) was the only victory, as they suffered defeats against Australia, Mexico (a game in which Cabrera reached his fifth foul by the 12th minute of the first half) and Czechoslovakia (who had 45 points scored by Kamil Brabenec). The national team finished the World Championship in the 11th place.

After the 1974 Championship, the team won two South American Championships: 1976 (at home in Bahía Blanca) and 1979 (in Medellin, Colombia). However, they failed to qualify for the World Cups of 1978 and 1982, due to finishing third in the qualifying tournaments of 1977 (without Perazzo, Raffaelli and Prato in the squad) and 1981 (same situation, but this time also without Cadillac, injured).

== 1980s ==
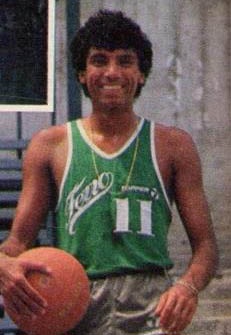
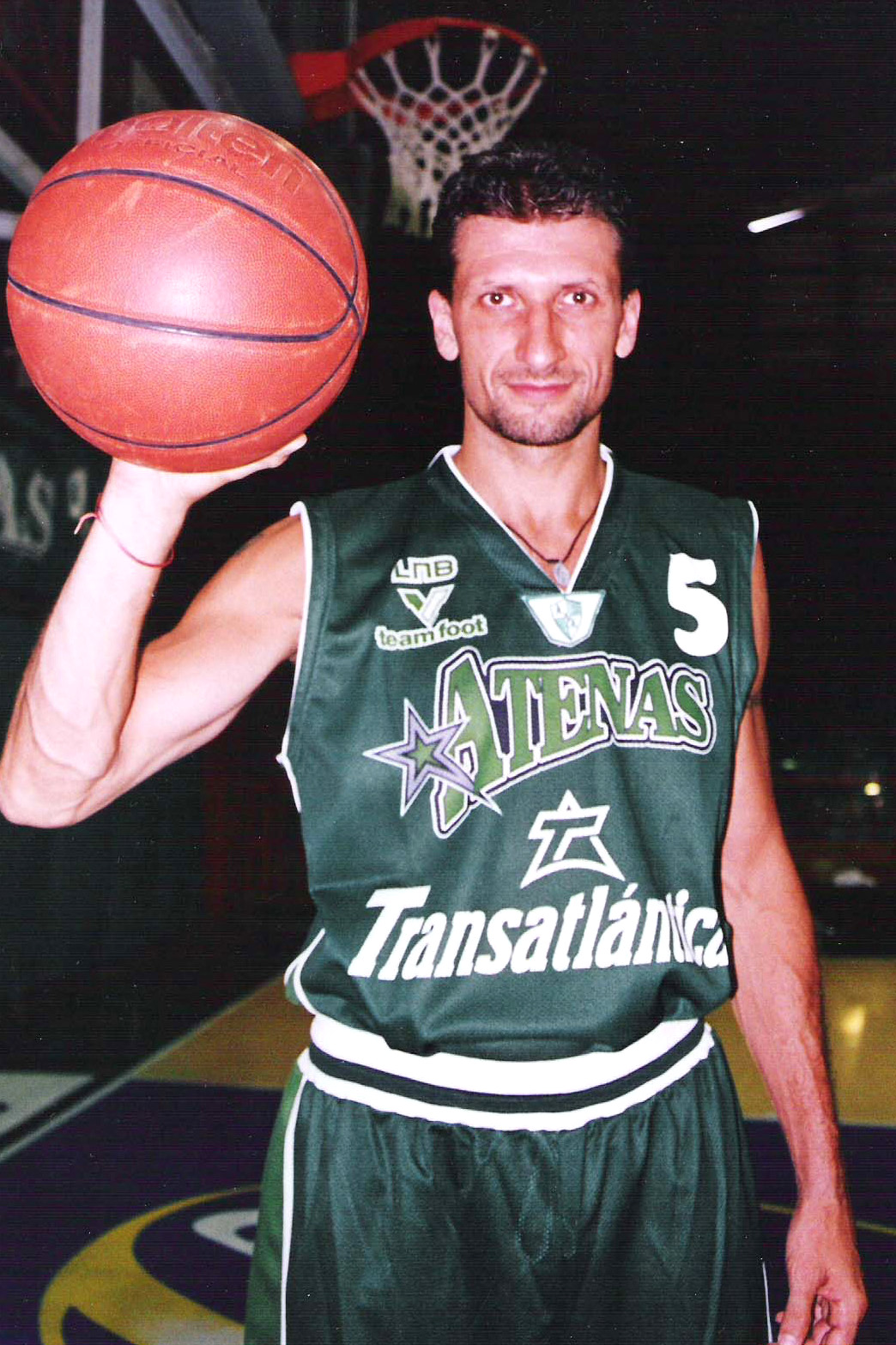
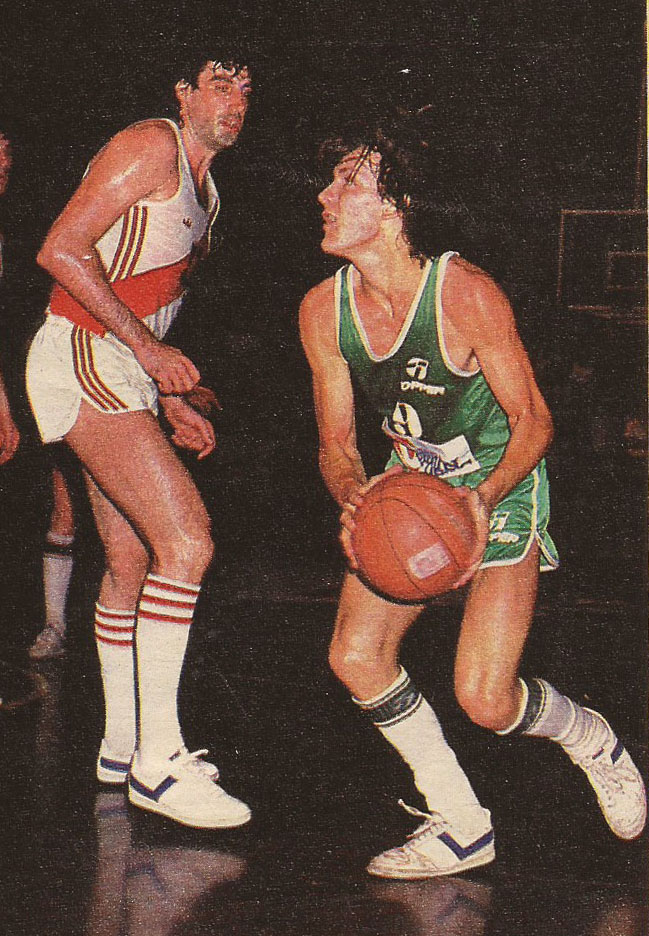
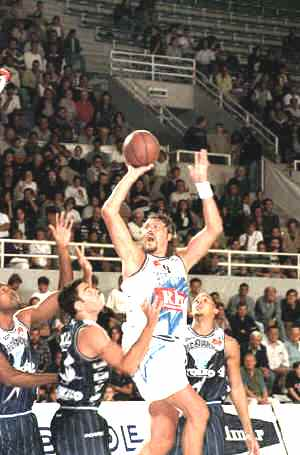
Miguel Cortijo, Héctor Campana, Marcelo Milanesio and Hernán Montenegro, some of the players from the Liga Nacional that contributed to the renovation in the national during the 1980s

In 1980, coached by Ripullone and with the assistance of Yugoslavian Ranko Zeravica, the team finished third in the Tournament of the Americas, earning their first qualification for the Olympics since 1952. This was arguably the biggest achievement for Argentine basketball since the 1950 World Championship title. However, due to the country's adherence to the U.S.-led boycott of the Moscow Olympics, the team did not compete in the tournament. The decade continued with a second place in the 1983 South American Basketball Championship (with Alberto Finguer as coach) and a disappointing 7th place (among nine teams) in the 1984 Tournament of the Americas held in Brazil.

Despite the poor international performance, 1984 came to be one of the most important years in the history of Argentine basketball, as it was the debut season of the Liga Nacional de Básquet (LNB), the first professional nationwide basketball league of the country.

For the 1985 South American Championship, León Najnudel, the mastermind behind the LNB's inception, was selected as the national coach. With him came a renovation in the national squad, with the youngsters Héctor Campana (20 years old), Hernán Montenegro (18), Sergio Aispurúa (20) and the two tallest Argentine players in history: Jorge González (19 and 2.30 m (7 ft 6 1/2 in)) and Fernando Borcel (17 and 2.18 m (7 ft 2 in)). Argentina finished the tournament third, enough to qualify for the 1986 FIBA World Championship to be held in Spain. However, Najnudel did not coach the team during the World Cup, having left the position due to a fight with CABB's president Amadeo Cejas.

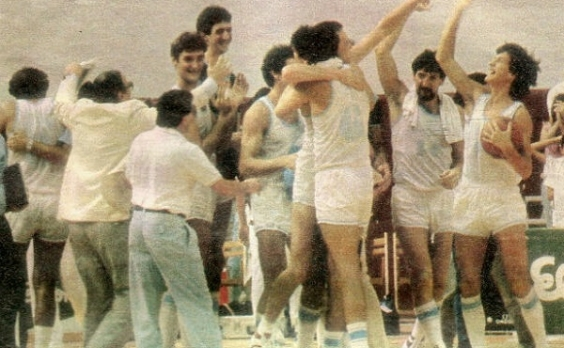
Argentine players celebrating the victory over USA by 74–70 in the 1986 World Cup.

Puerto Rican Flor Meléndez, by the time coach of Unión de Santa Fe in Argentina, was selected to manage the national team. The coach made up a squad with experienced players like Miguel Cortijo, Esteban Camisassa, Carlos Romano, Luis González, Luis Oroño and Gabriel Milovich, and youngsters like Campana, Sebastián Uranga, Diego Maggi, Marcelo Milanesio, Montenegro and Aispurúa. To get the necessary international experience, the team played a total 19 preparation matches in one month, though during the first games Meléndez' assistant Juan Carlos Alonso took up coaching duties while the former coached his team in the Puerto Rican league's playoff matches. During the preparation, González suffered an injury and had to be replaced by Borcel for the World Championship squad.

For the first round of the 1986 World Championship, Argentina was part of Group D with Yugoslavia, Canada, the Netherlands, Malaysia and New Zealand. The key match for obtaining qualification was the debut against the Netherlands, in which the youngster Rik Smits (19 years of age and 2.21 m (7 ft 3 in)) scored 25 points. However, Argentina won in extra time 82–75, with good contributions from the substitutes Campana (13 points) and Uranga (16). There were no surprises in the other 4 games: Argentina lost to Canada (82–96) and Yugoslavia (68–87) and defeated both Malaysia (93–73) and New Zealand (89–64), effectively qualifying for the second round of the tournament.

The national team faced a tough second round debut against the United States, that had a team made up by university players, 11 of whom went on to play in the NBA. However, Argentina achieved a surprising 74–70 victory, arguably the most important in the team's history until the Golden Generation era (starting roughly in 2002). After a 97–80 victory over China, the team had serious possibilities of qualifying to the semifinals, but Yugoslavia's defeat by the US crushed that chance. Subsequently, a 70–78 defeat by Italy forced Argentina to play for the 9th to 12th place. Further defeats against Greece (88–102, suffering 40 points by Nicos Gallis) and Cuba (85–81) derived in a 12th-place finish.

After the 1986 World Championship, Flor Meléndez took the team to win the gold medal in the 1987 South American Championship held in Asunción (Paraguay). It was the first title for Argentina since 1979. After that victory and a poor participation in the 1987 Panamerican Games, Meléndez left his coaching position and was replaced by Alberto Finguer. With the new coach, Argentina finished 8th (among 10 teams) in the 1989 FIBA Americas Championship. Nonetheless, the team qualified directly for the 1990 FIBA World Championship as the host nation.

== 1990s ==
River Plate's coach Carlos Boismené was selected to replace Finguer in 1990, with Guillermo Vecchio as his assistant. However, coach and assistant had a fight, leading to Vecchio's departure. Boismené rejected the possibility of having a replacement, even when Serbian Ranko Zeravica was offered. The coach also faced problems when forming the squad, due to Germán Filloy and Esteban Camisassa's injuries, and center Carlos Cerutti's death earlier that year. Hernán Montenegro was also cut alleging his problematic attitude. Moreover, in a pre-tournament friendly against Greece, Héctor Campana, the team's key offensive player, suffered an injury.

In the debut, with Campana playing injured, Argentina lost by 20 to the Soviet Union. The second game, decisive for qualification to the second round, was against Canada. With 4 minutes to go, Argentina was down 72–85. However, a 24–3 run gave the hosts the victory, which meant qualification to the second round after the third match-day victory over Egypt. In the second round, the team debuted against the United States in the Luna Park stadium. 33 points by Campana and a solid teamwork were not enough to avoid defeat, the same result suffered in the next four games: Puerto Rico, Greece and Australia (twice). Argentina finished the tournament 8th.

After the 1990 tournament, the head coaching job was held by Guillermo Vecchio for the four-years process prior to the 1994 World Championship. With a bronze medal at the 1993 FIBA Americas Championship, Argentina qualified to the competition to be held in Canada.

The squad for tournament was formed by the best players from the local league (exception being Montenegro, who rejected the call up) plus Marcelo Nicola, who was playing for Tau Cerámica in Spain. With a taller team (including Rubén Wolkowyski, Diego Osella, Osvaldo Tourn, Esteban Pérez and the aforementioned Nicola) and two high scoring shooting guards (Héctor Campana and Juan Espil).

Coached by Guillermo Vecchio, Argentina won first ever gold medal in senior men's Panamerican basketball, at the 1995 Pan American Games, after defeating the United States in the final, in Mar del Plata, Argentina. The team was composed by players as Marcelo Milanesio, Diego Osella, Ruben Wolkowisky, Estaban De la Fuente, Juan Espil, and a young Fabricio Oberto among others.

== 2000–2014: the Golden Generation ==
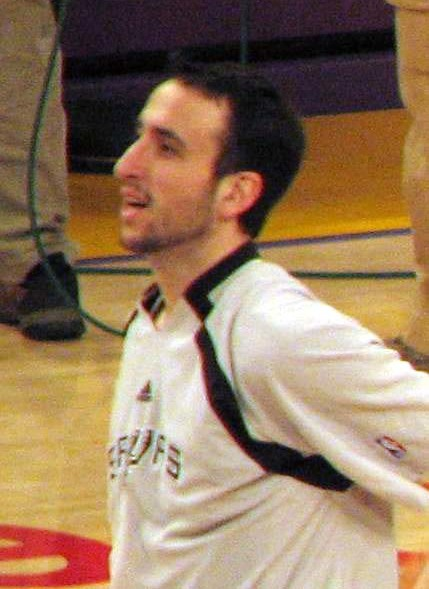
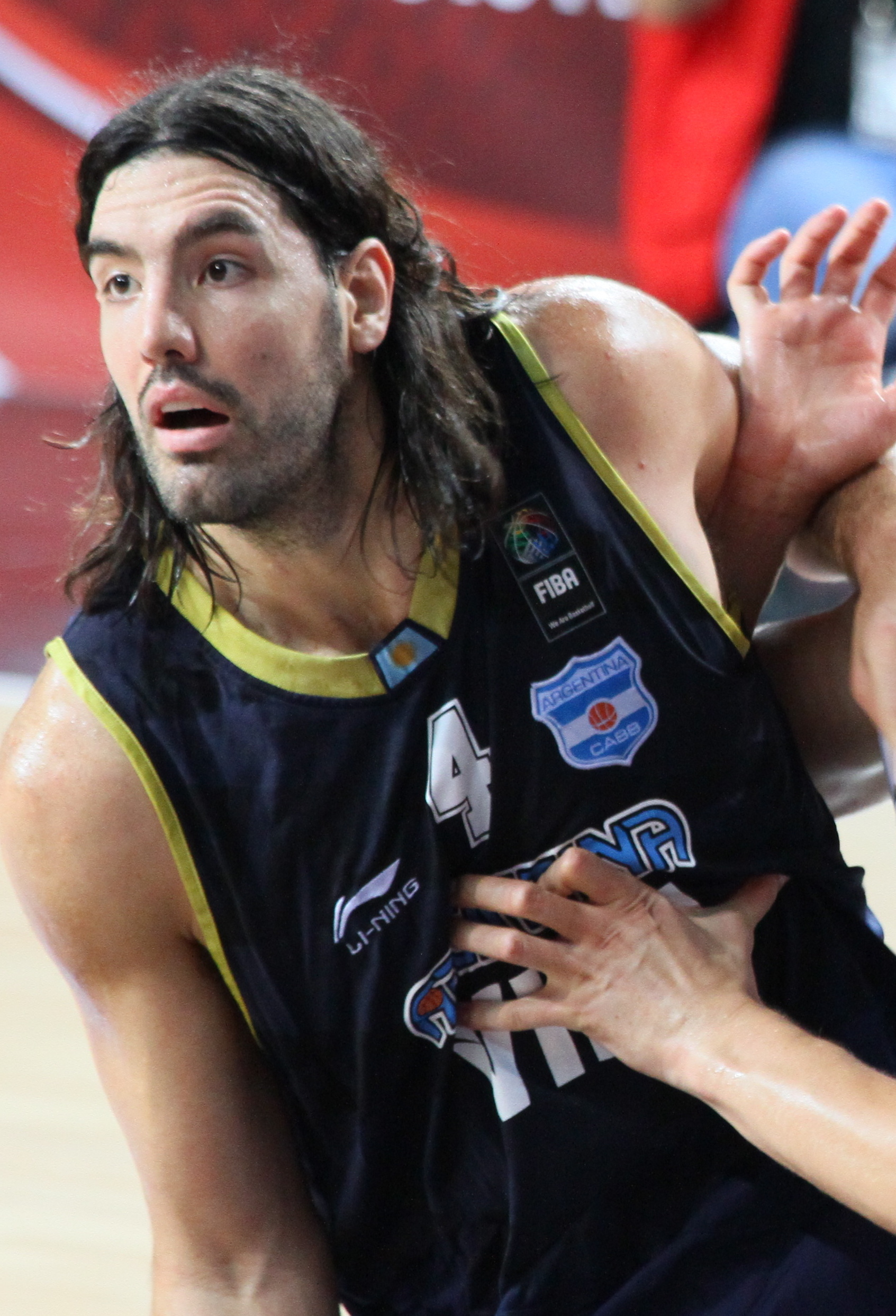
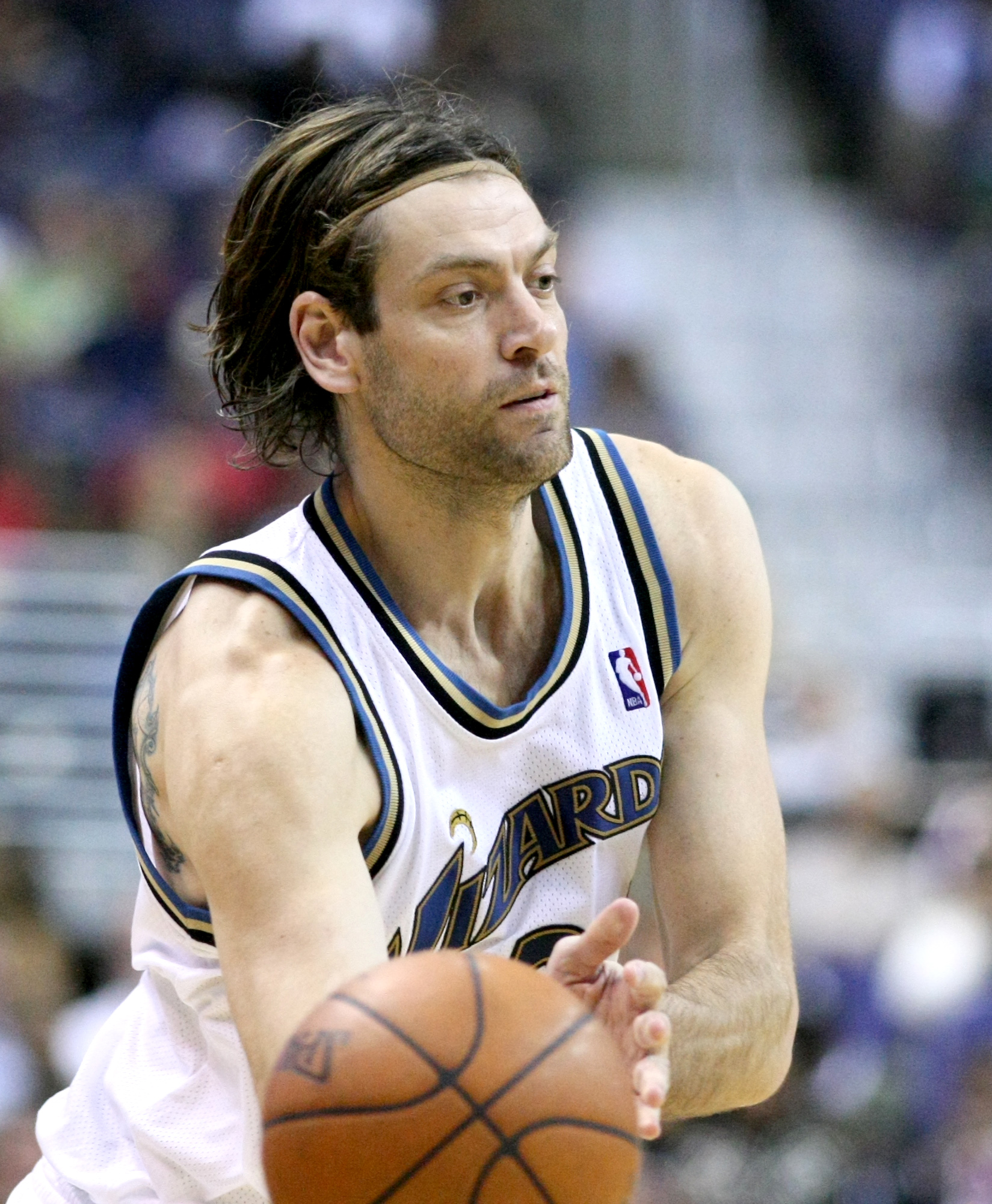
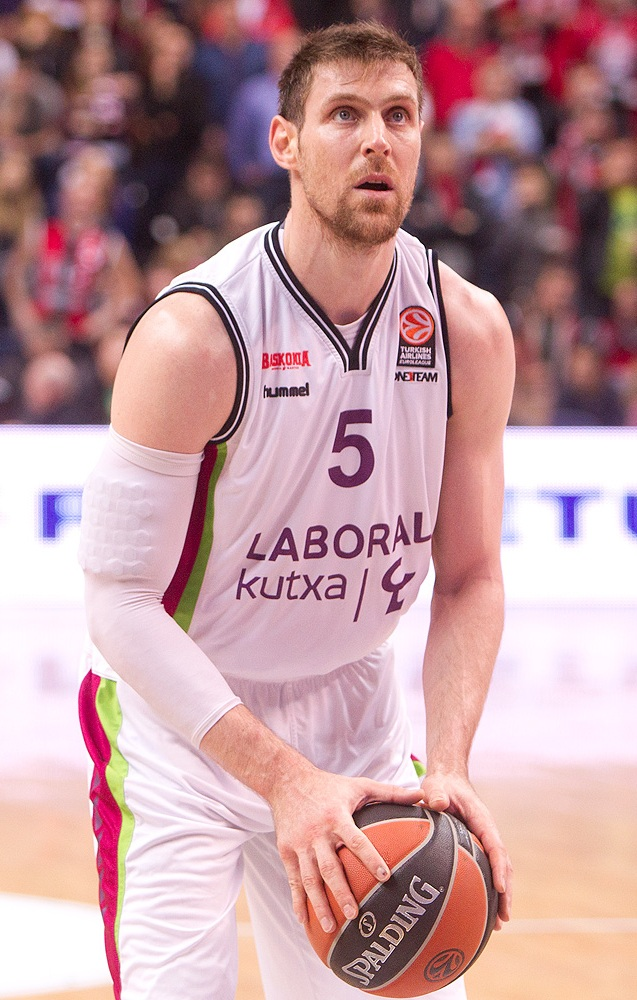
Manu Ginóbili, Luis Scola, Fabricio Oberto and Andrés Nocioni, some of the players that were part of the Golden Generation that raised at the 2002 World Championship

After obtaining back-to-back gold medals in the 2001 South American championship and in the 2001 Tournament of the Americas, Argentina took the first step on a path to solidify their place in basketball elite. Next came the 2002 FIBA World Championship held in Indianapolis, where they made history by being the first team to defeat a United States roster composed entirely of NBA players. Argentina would reach the finals for the first time since the first World Championship in 1950, but would lose to Yugoslavia. The following year, after obtaining a sixth place in the 2003 Pan American Games with an alternate roster, Argentina sent their best players to San Juan, Puerto Rico for the 2003 Tournament of the Americas that would grant three spots in the 2004 Summer Olympics. After a starting the tournament with a defeat against Mexico, Argentina would reach the finals and lose against the United States, securing a spot in the Olympics anyway.

In July 2004 Argentina began preparations for the Olympic Games in Athens, starting with the 2004 South American Championship held in Brazil, the Argentine team defeated the hosts in the final. Next came a series of exhibitions on home soil against Venezuela, Spain's alternate team and Brazil, on which Argentina came away with no victories. With the final roster decided, Argentina traveled to Europe for a last series of matches. From July 31 to August 3, the second edition of the FIBA Diamond Ball was held in Belgrade, a tournament that reunited the champions from the five FIBA zones, plus the reigning World Champion. Argentina participated as the Americas representative, since the United States did not participate and finished in third place. Argentina then concluded its series of exhibitions in Madrid with a victory against Lithuania and a defeat against the locals Spain.

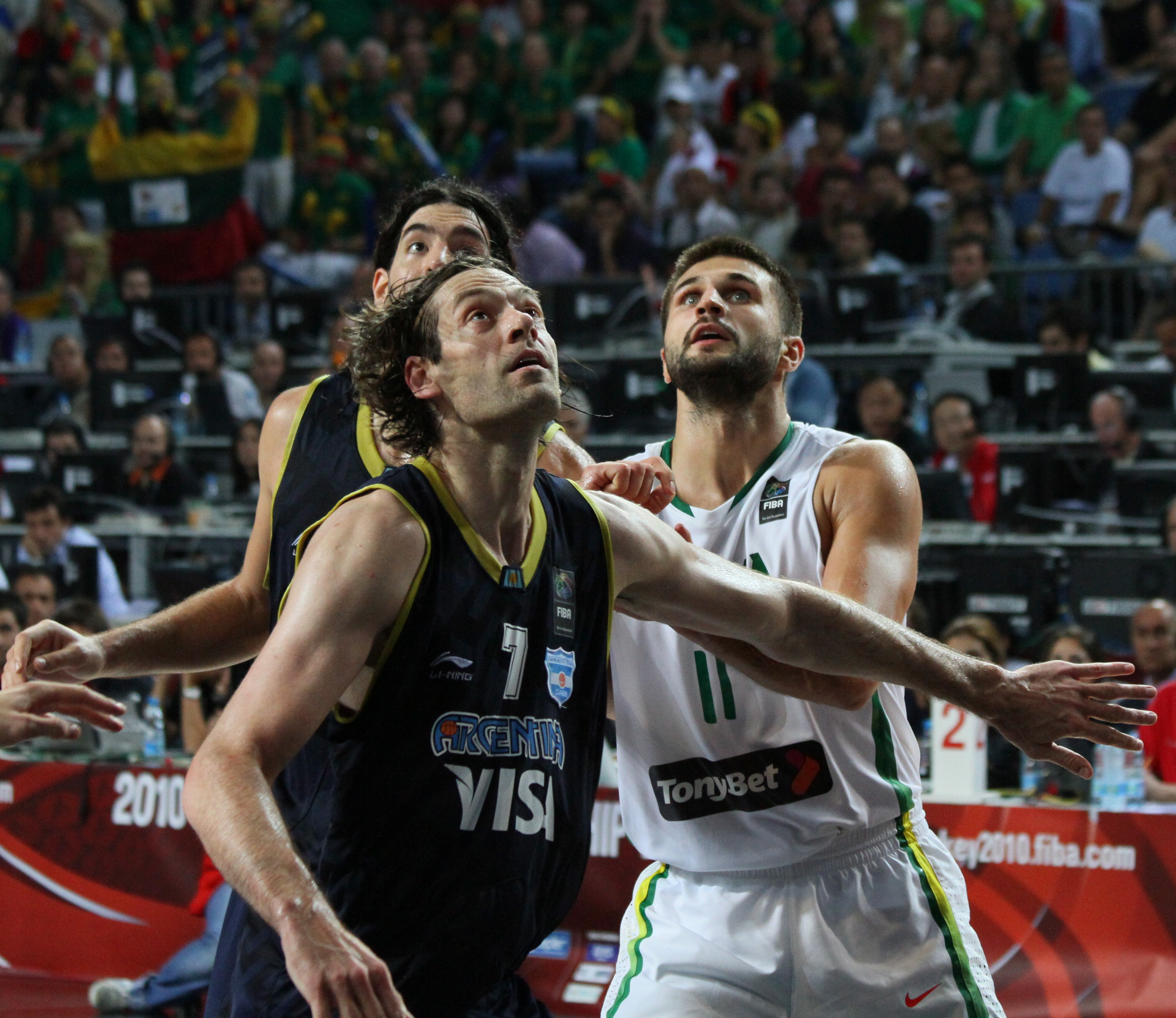
Fabricio Oberto (#7) against Lithuania's Linas Kleiza during the 2010 World Championship

Argentina made their debut on the group phase of the Olympic Tournament with an 83–82 victory against world champions Serbia and Montenegro, thanks to a last-second basket by Manu Ginóbili. After losses against Spain and Italy, Argentina still managed to advance to the next stage. In the quarterfinals, the Argentine team beat hosts Greece and advanced to the semifinals where they achieved yet another historic victory against the United States, denying the American men's team a gold medal for the first time since 1988 in Seoul – the last Olympic tournament before the advent of the Dream Team. On August 28, 2004, Argentina obtained its first gold medal in basketball by defeating Italy 84–69 in the final. The impact the series of results obtained between the Indianapolis and Athens tournaments led the Argentine press to dub this group of players The Golden Generation ("La Generación Dorada", in Spanish). The Olympics title in 2004 is the higher honor and important title of Argentine basketball.

After those triumphs, Argentina won the gold medal in 2008 FIBA Diamond Ball, and the bronze medal at The 2008 Beijing Summer Olympics Basketball Tournament. At the end of the 2008 Olympic Games Argentina reached the first position in the FIBA Men's Ranking.

In 2010, after the World Cup, Julio Lamas returned as coach of the national team. In 2011, under his guidance, the team won the FIBA Americas gold medal for the second time at the 2011 FIBA Americas Championship, played in the city of Mar del Plata, Argentina. The team qualified directly for the London's Olympic games, where they finished 4th.

In the 2014 World Cup, Argentina finished 11th after being defeated to Brazil on the round of 16. After that match the media stated it was the end of the Golden Generation with some of Argentina's key players (Pablo Prigioni, Leonardo Gutiérrez and Andrés Nocioni) retiring from the national team.

== 2015-present ==
In January 2015, Sergio Hernández was appointed coach of Argentina. With Hernández on the bench, the squad qualified to play the 2016 Summer Olympics held in Rio de Janeiro after winning the silver medal in the 2015 FIBA Americas Championship. With Scola (named MVP of the tournament) and Nocioni as the remaining key players from the Golden Generation and the addition of young players such as Facundo Campazzo, Nicolás Laprovittola, Nicolás Richotti, Patricio Garino, Nicolás Brussino, Gabriel Deck, Marcos Delía and Tayavek Gallizi, the team reached the final, losing to Venezuela by 76–71.

Manu Ginóbili and Carlos Delfino returned to the team for the Olympics after their injuries. Argentina finished 4th at Group B with three wins (against Nigeria, Croatia and Brazil and two losses (to Lithuania and Spain). In quarter finals, Argentina was defeated by United States (105–78), being therefore eliminated from the competition. After that match, Ginóbili y and Nocioni announced their retirement from the national team.

After the game, USA's coach, Mike Krzyzewski, praised the Argentine players defining them as "not only a team but a culture, because of the magnificence they have been showing to the world during the last two decades".

In 2019, led by Luis Scola and Facundo Campazzo at the pitch, and with Sergio Hernández as coach, the Argentine team won the gold medal in the Pan American Games, beating Puerto Rico in the final match. It was the second gold medal at the Pan American Games for Argentina. The last one had been in 1995.

In 2022, with Gabriel Deck and Facundo Campazzo standing out at the pitch (they were named in the All-Tournament Team), and with Pablo Prigioni as coach, the Argentine team won the gold medal in the 2022 FIBA Americup, beating the hosts Brazil in the final match. It was the third gold medal in the FIBA Americup for Argentina. The last one had been in 2011, in Mar Del Plata.

In 2023, the Argentine team won the gold medal in the Pan American Games, beating Venezuela in the final match. It was the second consecutive and third overall Pan American Games gold for Argentina.
