= 1950 FIBA World Championship =

1950 edition of the FIBA World Championship

1950 World Basketball Championship
FIBA Campeonato Mundial de Basquetebol Masculino de 1950

Tournament details
- Host country: Argentina
- City: Buenos Aires
- Dates: 22 October – 3 November
- Officially opened by: Juan Perón
- Teams: 10
- Venue: Luna Park Stadium

Final positions
- Champions: Argentina (1st title)
- Runners-up: United States
- Third place: Chile
- Fourth place: Brazil

Tournament statistics
- Games played: 31
- MVP: (Argentina) Oscar Furlong
- Top scorer: (Spain) Álvaro Salvadores (13.8 points per game)

The 1950 FIBA World Championship, also called the 1st World Basketball Championship – 1950, was the inaugural edition of the World Cup basketball tournament for men's national teams. It was held by the International Basketball Federation (FIBA), from 22 October to 3 November 1950. Argentina hosted the competition at Luna Park in Buenos Aires, where ten nations participated in the event.

Argentina claimed the gold medal, by beating the United States 64–50 in the decisive game of the final round. After winning the tournament, Argentinian fans celebrated by burning newspapers which became known as the "Night of the Torches".

== Host and venue ==
In the aftermath of World War II, Argentina was chosen as host of the inaugural World Cup partly because of its neutrality during the war.

Group	City	Arena	Capacity
Final round	Buenos Aires	Estadio Luna Park	9,000

== Competing nations ==
FIBA determined the requirements to qualify for the World Championship to be as follows:

- The top three teams in the previous Olympic tournament (the United States, France and Brazil).
- The top two teams from the previous South American Championship (Uruguay and Chile).
- The winner of EuroBasket 1949 (Egypt).
- The top team in Asia (South Korea).
- The host country (Argentina).

Prior to the Championship, South Korea withdrew due to logistical and financial difficulties in travelling to Argentina, while Uruguay withdrew after Argentinian immigration officials refused the team visas to enter the country.

Subsequently, FIBA extended invitations to Ecuador, Yugoslavia, Spain, and Peru.

Seeded to the 1st preliminary round	Seeded to the 2nd preliminary round
Egypt; Peru; Yugoslavia; Ecuador	Argentina; Brazil; Chile; France; Spain; United States

== Preliminary rounds ==
First round
Peru	33
Yugoslavia	27

Second round
Chile	33
United States	37
Brazil	40
Peru	33

First repass round (1st and 2nd round losers)
Chile	40
Yugoslavia	24

Second repass round (1st repass round winners)
Chile	54
Spain	40

First round
Egypt	43
Ecuador	37

Second round
Egypt	57
Spain	56
Argentina	56
France	40

First repass round (1st and 2nd round losers)
Ecuador	43
France	48

Second repass round (1st repass round winners)
Peru	46
France	49

=== First phase ===
22 October

Peru	33–27	Yugoslavia
Scoring by half: 18-16, 15-11

Buenos Aires

22 October

Egypt	43–37	Ecuador
Scoring by half: 18-22, 25-15

Buenos Aires

- Egypt and Peru advance to the second preliminary phase.
- Ecuador and Yugoslavia advance to the first repass round.

=== Second phase ===
23 October

United States	37–33	Chile
Scoring by half: 20-19, 17-14

Buenos Aires

23 October

Argentina	56–40	France
Scoring by half: 30-17, 26-23

Buenos Aires

23 October

Peru	33–40	Brazil
Scoring by half: 15-16, 18-24

Buenos Aires

23 October

Spain	56–57	Egypt
Scoring by half: 26-23, 30-34

Buenos Aires

- Argentina, Brazil, Egypt and USA advance to the final round.
- Chile and France advance to the first repass round
- Peru and Spain advance to the second repass round.

== Repass rounds ==
=== First phase ===
24 October

Chile	40–24	Yugoslavia
Scoring by half: 27-11, 13-13

Buenos Aires

24 October

Ecuador	43–48	France
Scoring by half: 26-30, 17-18

Buenos Aires

- Chile and France advance to the second phase.
- Ecuador and Yugoslavia are relegated to the classification round.

=== Second phase ===
25 October

Spain	40–54	Chile
Scoring by half: 18-24, 22-30

Buenos Aires

25 October

France	49–46 (OT) (3-0)	Peru
Scoring by half: 25-22, 21-24

Buenos Aires

- Chile and France advance to the final round.
- Peru and Spain are relegated to the classification round.

== Classification round ==
Pos	Team	Pld	W	L	PF	PA	PD	Pts
7	Peru	3	3	0	140	123	+17	6
8	Ecuador	3	2	1	142	141	+1	5
9	Spain	3	1	2	89	97	−8	4
10	Yugoslavia	3	0	3	83	93	−10	2

Source: FIBA archive
Rules for classification: 1) points; 2) head-to-head points; 3) head-to-head goal average; 4) head-to-head number of points scored.

27 October

Ecuador	45–40	Yugoslavia
Scoring by half: 14–15, 31–25

La Plata, Argentina

27 October

Peru	43–37	Spain
Scoring by half: 20–19, 23–18

La Plata, Argentina

29 October

Yugoslavia	43–46 (OT)	Peru
Scoring by half: 24–14, 11–21 Overtime: 4–4, 4–7

Rosario, Argentina

29 October

Ecuador	54–50	Spain
Scoring by half: 29–25, 25–25

Rosario, Argentina

30 October

Spain	2–0	Yugoslavia
Yugoslavia refused to stand for the Spanish national anthem or play for political reasons. Spain was awarded the game on forfeit.

Buenos Aires, Argentina

30 October

Ecuador	43–51	Peru
Scoring by half: 17–23, 26–28

Buenos Aires, Argentina

== Final round ==
Pos	Team	Pld	W	L	PF	PA	PD	Pts
1	Argentina (C, H)	5	5	0	300	200	+100	10
2	United States	5	4	1	221	200	+21	9
3	Chile	5	2	3	209	233	−24	7
4	Brazil	5	2	3	214	182	+32	7
5	Egypt	5	2	3	158	208	−50	7
6	France	5	0	5	173	252	−79	5

Source: FIBA archive
Rules for classification: 1) points; 2) head-to-head points; 3) head-to-head goal average; 4) head-to-head number of points scored.
(C) Champions; (H) Hosts

27 October

Chile	48–44	France
Scoring by half: 27-19, 21-25

Buenos Aires, Argentina

27 October

Egypt	32–34	United States
Scoring by half: 19-18, 13-16

Buenos Aires, Argentina

29 October

Egypt	31–28	France
Scoring by half: 10-9, 21-19

Buenos Aires, Argentina

29 October

Argentina	40–35	Brazil
Scoring by half: 22-21, 18-14

Buenos Aires, Argentina

30 October

Argentina	62–41	Chile
Scoring by half: 36-17, 26-24

Buenos Aires, Argentina

30 October

Brazil	42–45	United States
Scoring by half: 25-26, 17-19

Buenos Aires, Argentina

31 October

Brazil	38–19	Egypt
Scoring by half: 17-11, 21-8

Buenos Aires, Argentina

31 October

Argentina	66–41	France
Scoring by half: 38-19, 28-22

Buenos Aires, Argentina

1 November

Chile	29–44	United States
Scoring by half: 12-29, 17-15

Buenos Aires, Argentina

1 November

Argentina	68–33	Egypt
Scoring by half: 35-15, 33-18

Buenos Aires, Argentina

2 November

France	33–48	United States
Scoring by half: 23-26, 10-22

Buenos Aires, Argentina

2 November

Brazil	40–51	Chile
Scoring by half: 17-25, 23-26

Buenos Aires, Argentina

3 November

Chile	40–43	Egypt
Scoring by half: 19-18, 21-25

Buenos Aires, Argentina

3 November

Brazil	59–27	France
Scoring by half: 31-14, 28-13

Buenos Aires, Argentina

3 November

Argentina	64–50	United States
Scoring by half: 34-24, 30-26
Pts: Oscar Furlong 20		Pts: John Stanich 11

Buenos Aires, Argentina
Attendance: 20,000

== Awards ==
Argentina won its first-ever World Cup, and Oscar Furlong was named the tournament's Most Valuable Player. Furlong averaged a team-high and 11.2 points during the tournament, fourth highest of all players.

1950 World Championship winner

Argentina
First title

Most Valuable Player
(Argentina) Oscar Furlong

All-Tournament Team

- Oscar Furlong (Argentina)
- (United States) John Stanich (USA)
- Rufino Bernedo (Chile)
- Álvaro Salvadores (Spain)
- Ricardo González (Argentina)

== Final standings ==
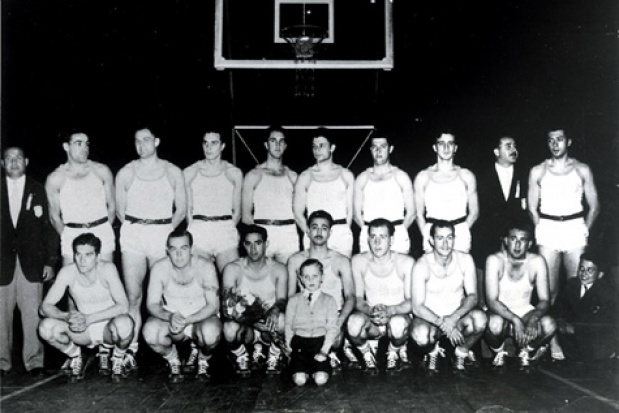
The Argentina squad that won their first World championship.

Rank	Team	Record
1	Argentina	6–0
2	United States	5–1
3	Chile	4–4
4	Brazil	3–3
5	Egypt	4–3
6	France	2–6
7	Peru	4–2
8	Ecuador	2–3
9	Spain	1–4
10	Yugoslavia	0–5

== Team rosters ==
Source: FIBA archive

1. Argentina: 8.Oscar Furlong, 11.Ricardo González, 3.Pedro Bustos, 5.Leopoldo Contarbio, 4.Hugo del Vecchio, 7.Vito Liva, 14.Alberto López, 10.Rubén Menini, 13.Omar Monza, 6.Raúl Pérez Varela, 12.Juan Carlos Uder, 9.Roberto Viau (Coach: Jorge Hugo Canavesi – Casimiro González Trilla])
2. USA: 20.John Stanich, 66.Bob Fisher, 75.Bryce Heffley, 55.Thomas Jaquet, 33.Dan Kahler, 19.John Langdon, 40.Les Metzger, 44.J. L. Parks, 22.Jimmy Reese, 16.Don Slocum, 77.Blake Williams (Coach: Gordon Carpenter)
3. Chile: Rufino Bernedo, Pedro Araya, Eduardo Cordero, Mariano Fernández, Exequiel Figueroa, Juan José Gallo, Raúl López, Luis Enrique Marmentini, Juan Ostoic, Hernán Ramos, Marcos Sánchez, Víctor Mahana (Coach: Kenneth Davidson)
4. Brazil: 45.Zenny de Azevedo "Algodão", 46.Ruy de Freitas, 44.Alfredo da Motta, 48.Paulo Rodrigues Siqueira "Montanha", 42.Hélio Marques Pereira "Godinho", 46.Celso dos Santos, 47.Plutão de Macedo, 49.Sebastião Amorim Gimenez "Tiao", 50.Thales Monteiro, 51.Alexandre Gemignani, Milton Santos Marques "Miltinho", 53.Ângelo Bonfietti "Angelim" (Coach: Moacyr Brondi Daiuto)

== Top scorers ==
1. Álvaro Salvadores (Spain) 13.8
2. Fortunato Muñoz (Ecuador) 13.2
3. Alfredo Arroyave (Ecuador) 11.4
4. Oscar Furlong (Argentina) 11.2
5. Rufino Bernedo (Chile) 10.8
6. Ricardo González (Argentina) 10.7
7. Eduardo Kucharski González (Spain) 9.8
8. Hussein Kamel Montasser (Egypt) 8.8
9. Eduardo Fiestas (Peru) 8.7
10. Alberto Fernández (Peru) 8.2
