= Menini =

Menini is a surname. Notable people with the surname include:

- Alexandre Menini (born 1983), French rugby union player
- Joaquín Menini (born 1991), Argentine field hockey player
- Rubén Menini (1924–2020), Argentine basketball player
- Alexandre Menini (born 1973), French digital entrepreneur

== See also ==
- Menino
