= J. L. Parks =

American basketball player (1927–2018)

Personal information
- Born: April 3, 1927 Paoli, Oklahoma, U.S.
- Died: March 13, 2018 (aged 90) Houston, Texas, U.S.
- Listed height: 6 ft 0 in (1.83 m)
- Listed weight: 175 lb (79 kg)

Career information
- High school: Paoli (Paoli, Oklahoma)
- College: Oklahoma State (1944–1949)
- Position: Guard
- Number: 28, 44

Career highlights
- 2× NCAA champion (1945, 1946); 2× First-team All-MVC (1946, 1948); Second-team All-MVC (1949)
- Stats at Basketball Reference
Medals
Men's basketball
Representing the United States
World Championship
Silver medal – second place	1950 Argentina	Team competition

John Leonard "J. L." Parks (April 3, 1927 – March 13, 2018) was an American basketball player. He won two national championships at Oklahoma A&M University (now Oklahoma State) and represented the U.S. as a member of the 1950 FIBA World Championship in Buenos Aires, Argentina.

Parks, a 6'0 guard from Pauls Valley, Oklahoma, attended Oklahoma A&M from 1944 to 1946 and 1947–49, winning championships with the Aggies in both 1945 and 1946 with future Hall of Fame teammate Bob Kurland. When Parks and teammate Bob Harris again led the Aggies to the Final Four in 1949, Parks became the first player in NCAA history to compete in three Final Fours. Parks was named first team All-Missouri Valley Conference in 1946 and 1948, and was named second team all-conference in 1949.

After completing his college eligibility, Parks was drafted by the Indianapolis Jets in the 1949 BAA Draft. However, he opted to compete in the Amateur Athletic Union. He joined the Denver Chevrolets with former teammate Blake Williams, and in 1950 the team was chosen as the U.S. National team's entry to the first FIBA World Championship in 1950.

Parks played in all six of the team's matches as the team won their first five games to reach the final against host team Argentina. Parks averaged 2.2 points per game for the tournament.

Parks died on March 13, 2018. Having served as a staff sergeant in the United States Army, he was interred at Houston National Cemetery on March 22, 2018.
