= Raúl Pérez =

Raúl Pérez may refer to:

- Raúl Pérez (boxer) (born 1967), Mexican boxer
- Raúl Pérez (rugby union) (born 1965), Argentine rugby union player
- Raúl Pérez (Argentine footballer) (1939–2014), Argentine footballer
- Raúl Pérez Varela (1925–?), Argentine basketball player
- Raúl Pérez (Chilean footballer), Chilean footballer
