= FIBA Basketball World Cup Most Valuable Player =

International sports award

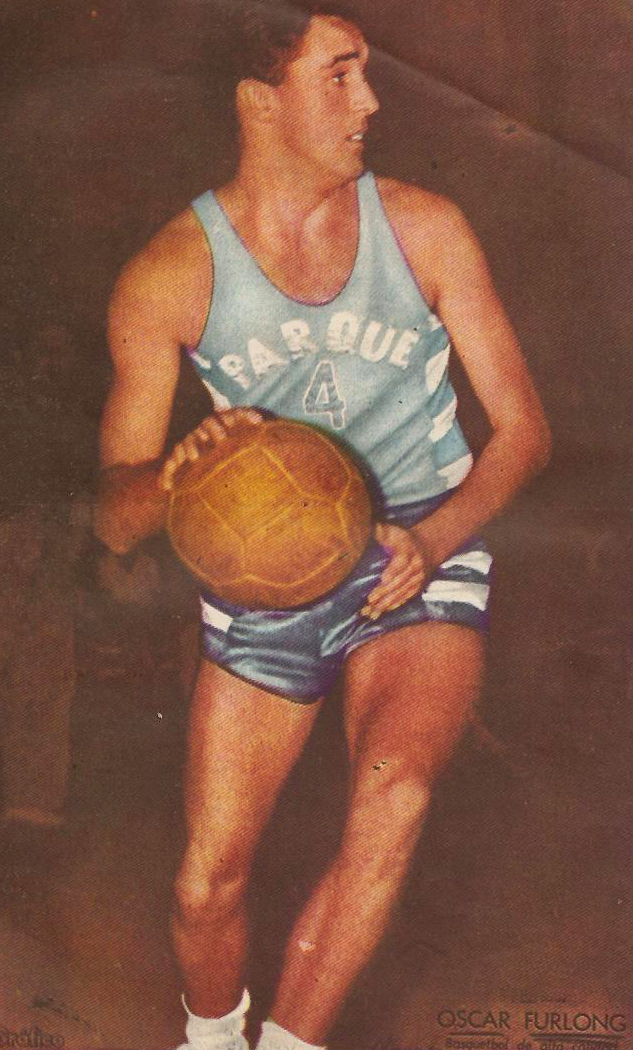
Oscar Furlong won the inaugural award in 1950.

The FIBA Basketball World Cup Most Valuable Player is an award, that is given by FIBA, to the Most Valuable Player of the FIBA Basketball World Cup. The inaugural award was handed out in 1950, to Oscar Furlong.

== Winners ==
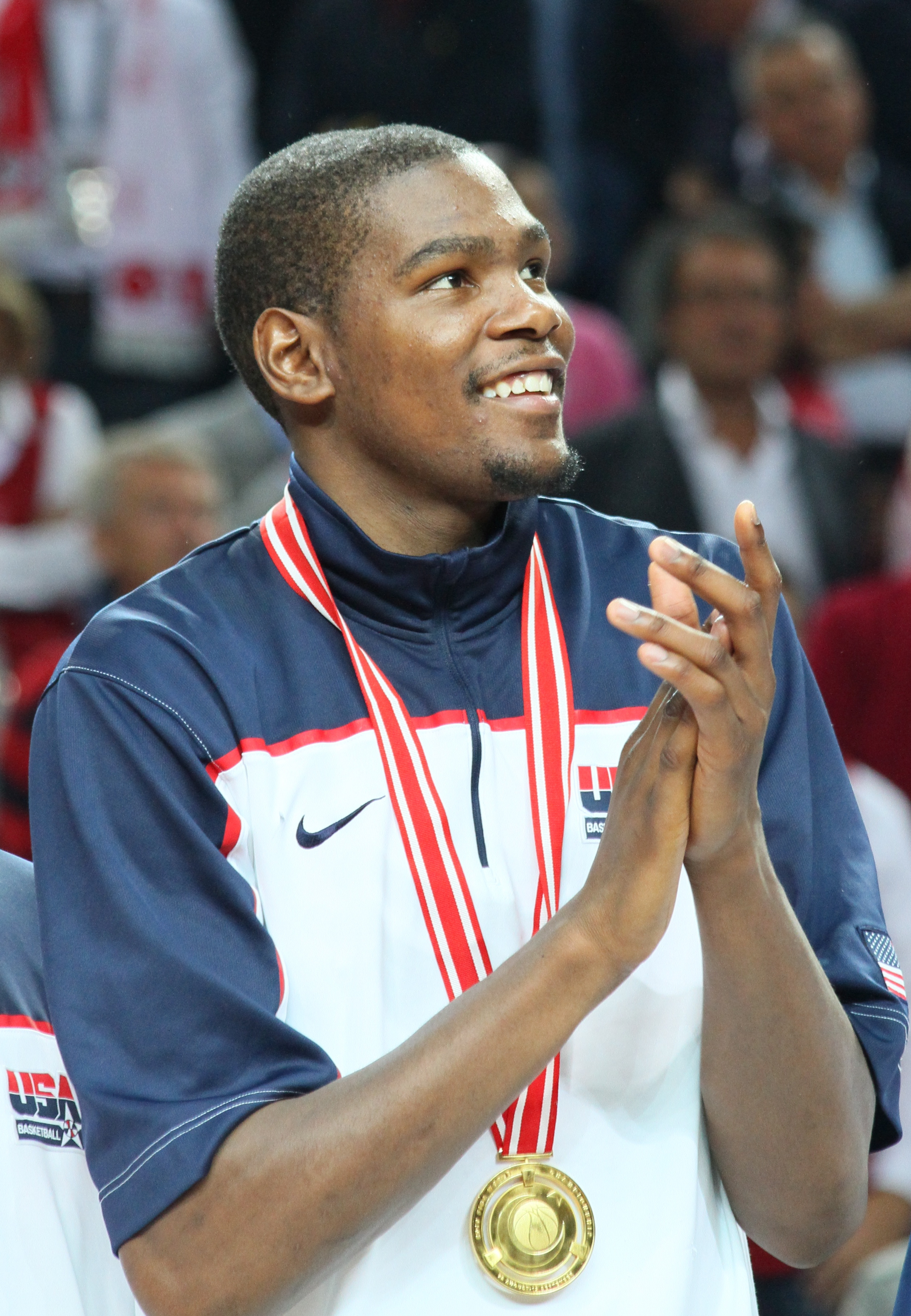
Kevin Durant won the MVP in 2010.

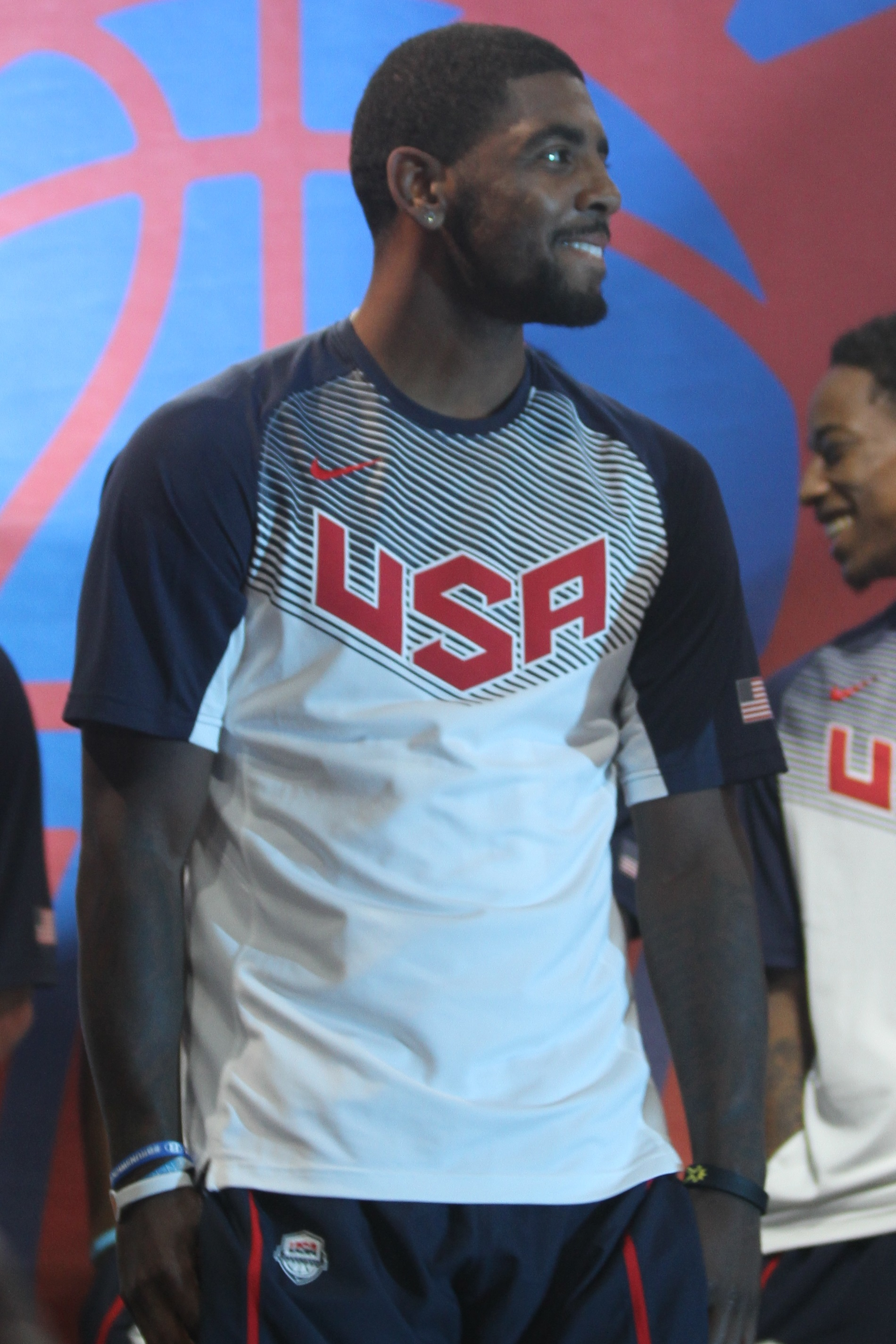
Kyrie Irving won the MVP in 2014.

	Denotes player whose team won that years tournament
*	Inducted into the Naismith Memorial Basketball Hall of Fame
**	Inducted into the FIBA Hall of Fame
***	Inducted into both the Naismith and FIBA Halls of Fame
^	Denotes player who is still active
Player (X)	Denotes the number of times the player had been named MVP at that time
Team (X)	Denotes the number of times a player from this team had won at that time

Year	Player	Position	Team	Ref.
1950	Oscar Furlong**	Center	Argentina	
1954	Kirby Minter	Forward	United States	
1959	Amaury Pasos**	Forward	Brazil	
1963	Wlamir Marques**	Forward	Brazil (2)	
1967	Ivo Daneu**	Guard	Yugoslavia	
1970	Sergei Belov***	Guard	Soviet Union	
1974	Dragan Kićanović**	Guard	Yugoslavia (2)	
1978	Dražen Dalipagić***	Forward	Yugoslavia (3)	
1982	Rolando Frazer	Forward	Panama	
1986	Dražen Petrović***	Guard	Yugoslavia (4)	
1990	Toni Kukoč***	Forward	Yugoslavia (5)	
1994	Shaquille O'Neal***	Center	United States (3)	
1998	Dejan Bodiroga	Forward	(Serbia and Montenegro) FR Yugoslavia	
2002	Dirk Nowitzki***	Forward	Germany	
2006	Pau Gasol***	Center	Spain	
2010	Kevin Durant^	Forward	United States (4)	
2014	Kyrie Irving^	Guard	United States (5)	
2019	Ricky Rubio^	Guard	Spain (2)	
2023	Dennis Schröder^	Guard	Germany (2)	

== See also ==
- FIBA World Cup
- FIBA World Cup Top Scorer
- FIBA World Cup All-Tournament Team
- FIBA World Cup Records
- FIBA EuroBasket
- FIBA EuroBasket MVP
- FIBA EuroBasket Top Scorer
- FIBA EuroBasket All-Tournament Team
- FIBA EuroBasket Records
- FIBA Hall of Fame
- FIBA Order of Merit
- FIBA's 50 Greatest Players (1991)
