= Dick Retherford =

Personal information
- Born: September 3, 1930 Westerville, Ohio, U.S.
- Died: May 5, 2019 (aged 88)
- Listed height: 6 ft 7 in (2.01 m)
- Listed weight: 210 lb (95 kg)

Career information
- College: Baldwin Wallace (1949–1952)
- NBA draft: 1952: 8th round
- Drafted by: Milwaukee Hawks
- Position: Center

Career history
- 1953–1956: Peoria Caterpillars

Career highlights
- AAU All-American (1954)
- Stats at Basketball Reference

Richard Eugene Retherford (September 3, 1930 - May 5, 2019) was an American basketball player. He was a member of the United States national team that won gold at the 1954 FIBA World Championship in Rio de Janeiro where he was named to the All-Tournament second team for his play.

Retherford had previously played college basketball for Baldwin-Wallace College from 1949 to 1952 where he scored 1,264 points for his career. He was inducted into the schools athletics Hall of Fame in 1971.

Following his college career, he was drafted by the Milwaukee Hawks in the 8th round of the 1952 NBA draft but never played in the league. Instead, he joined the Peoria Caterpillars of the Amateur Athletic Union where he won back-to-back AAU championships.
