= FIBA Basketball World Cup All-Tournament Team =

Award to the five best players of the event

The FIBA Basketball World Cup All-Tournament Team is an award, that is given by FIBA, to the five best players of the FIBA Basketball World Cup. The 2023 tournament marked the first time an All-Second Team was selected.

Oscar Schmidt and Wlamir Marques of Brazil have the most All-Tournament team awards with three each.

== Honourees ==
*	Inducted into the Naismith Memorial Basketball Hall of Fame
**	Inducted into the FIBA Hall of Fame
***	Inducted into both the Naismith and FIBA Halls of Fame
	Denotes player who is still active
Player (X)	Denotes the number of times the player has been selected
**Player** **(in bold text)**	Indicates the player who won the event's Most Valuable Player award

Year	First Team			Second Team		
Year	Player	Position	Team	Player	Position	Team
1950	John Stanich	Guard	United States	Unknown/not awarded		
1950	Ricardo Primitivo González	Guard	Argentina	Unknown/not awarded		
1950	Rufino Bernedo	Forward	Chile	Unknown/not awarded		
1950	Álvaro Salvadores	Forward	Spain	Unknown/not awarded		
1950	**Oscar Furlong****	Center	Argentina	Unknown/not awarded		
1954	Zenny de Azevedo	Guard	Brazil	Dick Retherford	N/A	United States
1954	Oscar Moglia**	Guard	Uruguay	Carl Ridd	N/A	Canada
1954	Wlamir Marques**	Forward	Brazil	Amaury Pasos**	N/A	Brazil
1954	**Kirby Minter**	Forward	United States	Ângelo Bonfietti	N/A	Brazil
1954	Joe Stratton	N/A	United States	Carlos Loyzaga**	Center	Philippines
1959	Juan Vicéns	Guard	Puerto Rico	Unknown/not awarded		
1959	Atanas Atanasov	Guard	Bulgaria	Unknown/not awarded		
1959	Wlamir Marques** (2)	Forward	Brazil	Unknown/not awarded		
1959	**Amaury Pasos****	Forward	Brazil	Unknown/not awarded		
1959	Jānis Krūmiņš	Center	Soviet Union	Unknown/not awarded		
1963	**Wlamir Marques**** (3)	Forward	Brazil	Unknown/not awarded		
1963	Don Kojis	Forward	United States	Unknown/not awarded		
1963	Maxime Dorigo	Forward	France	Unknown/not awarded		
1963	Amaury Pasos** (2)	Forward	Brazil	Unknown/not awarded		
1963	Aleksandr Petrov	Center	Soviet Union	Unknown/not awarded		
1967	**Ivo Daneu****	Guard	Yugoslavia	Unknown/not awarded		
1967	Mieczysław Łopatka**	Forward	Poland	Unknown/not awarded		
1967	Modestas Paulauskas**	Forward	Soviet Union	Unknown/not awarded		
1967	Radivoj Korać***	Forward	Yugoslavia	Unknown/not awarded		
1967	Luiz Cláudio Menon	Center	Brazil	Unknown/not awarded		
1970	Kenny Washington	Guard	United States	Unknown/not awarded		
1970	**Sergei Belov*****	Guard	Soviet Union	Unknown/not awarded		
1970	Modestas Paulauskas** (2)	Forward	Soviet Union	Unknown/not awarded		
1970	Ubiratan Pereira Maciel*	Forward	Brazil	Unknown/not awarded		
1970	Krešimir Ćosić***	Center	Yugoslavia	Unknown/not awarded		
1974	Wayne Brabender	Guard	Spain	Unknown/not awarded		
1974	Alejandro Urgelles Guibot	Forward	Cuba	Unknown/not awarded		
1974	Aleksandr Salnikov	Forward	Soviet Union	Unknown/not awarded		
1974	Alexander Belov**	Center	Soviet Union	Unknown/not awarded		
1974	Vinko Jelovac	Center	Yugoslavia	Unknown/not awarded		
1978	Dragan Kićanović**	Guard	Yugoslavia	Unknown/not awarded		
1978	Oscar Schmidt***	Forward	Brazil	Unknown/not awarded		
1978	**Dražen Dalipagić*****	Forward	Yugoslavia	Unknown/not awarded		
1978	Krešimir Ćosić*** (2)	Center	Yugoslavia	Unknown/not awarded		
1978	Vladimir Tkachenko**	Center	Soviet Union	Unknown/not awarded		
1982	Doc Rivers	Guard	United States	Unknown/not awarded		
1982	Dragan Kićanović** (2)	Guard	Yugoslavia	Unknown/not awarded		
1982	Juan Antonio San Epifanio**	Forward	Spain	Unknown/not awarded		
1982	Anatoly Myshkin	Forward	Soviet Union	Unknown/not awarded		
1982	Vladimir Tkachenko** (2)	Center	Soviet Union	Unknown/not awarded		
1986	**Dražen Petrović*****	Guard	Yugoslavia	Unknown/not awarded		
1986	Oscar Schmidt*** (2)	Forward	Brazil	Unknown/not awarded		
1986	Valeri Tikhonenko	Forward	Soviet Union	Unknown/not awarded		
1986	David Robinson***	Center	United States	Unknown/not awarded		
1986	Arvydas Sabonis***	Center	Soviet Union	Unknown/not awarded		
1990	Kenny Anderson	Guard	United States	Unknown/not awarded		
1990	Federico López	Guard	Puerto Rico	Unknown/not awarded		
1990	Oscar Schmidt*** (3)	Forward	Brazil	Unknown/not awarded		
1990	**Toni Kukoč*****	Forward	Yugoslavia	Unknown/not awarded		
1990	Vlade Divac***	Center	Yugoslavia	Unknown/not awarded		
1994	Sergei Bazarevich	Guard	Russia	Unknown/not awarded		
1994	Reggie Miller*	Guard	United States	Unknown/not awarded		
1994	Shawn Kemp	Forward	United States	Unknown/not awarded		
1994	Dino Rađa*	Forward	Croatia	Unknown/not awarded		
1994	**Shaquille O'Neal*****	Center	United States	Unknown/not awarded		
1998	Vasily Karasev	Guard	Russia	Unknown/not awarded		
1998	Alberto Herreros	Forward	Spain	Unknown/not awarded		
1998	**Dejan Bodiroga**	Forward	(Serbia and Montenegro) FR Yugoslavia	Unknown/not awarded		
1998	Gregor Fučka	Forward	Italy	Unknown/not awarded		
1998	Željko Rebrača	Center	(Serbia and Montenegro) FR Yugoslavia	Unknown/not awarded		
2002	Manu Ginóbili*	Guard	Argentina	Unknown/not awarded		
2002	Peja Stojaković	Forward	(Serbia and Montenegro) FR Yugoslavia	Unknown/not awarded		
2002	Pero Cameron**	Forward	New Zealand	Unknown/not awarded		
2002	**Dirk Nowitzki***	Forward	Germany	Unknown/not awarded		
2002	Yao Ming***	Center	China	Unknown/not awarded		
2006	Manu Ginóbili* (2)	Guard	Argentina	Unknown/not awarded		
2006	Theodoros Papaloukas	Guard	Greece	Unknown/not awarded		
2006	Carmelo Anthony	Forward	United States	Unknown/not awarded		
2006	Jorge Garbajosa	Forward	Spain	Unknown/not awarded		
2006	**Pau Gasol***	Center	Spain	Unknown/not awarded		
2010	Miloš Teodosić	Guard	Serbia	Unknown/not awarded		
2010	Hidayet Türkoğlu	Forward	Turkey	Unknown/not awarded		
2010	**Kevin Durant**	Forward	United States	Unknown/not awarded		
2010	Linas Kleiza	Forward	Lithuania	Unknown/not awarded		
2010	Luis Scola	Forward	Argentina	Unknown/not awarded		
2014	**Kyrie Irving**	Guard	United States	Unknown/not awarded		
2014	Miloš Teodosić (2)	Guard	Serbia	Unknown/not awarded		
2014	Nicolas Batum	Forward	France	Unknown/not awarded		
2014	Kenneth Faried	Forward	United States	Unknown/not awarded		
2014	Pau Gasol* (2)	Center	Spain	Unknown/not awarded		
2019	**Ricky Rubio**	Guard	Spain	Unknown/not awarded		
2019	Bogdan Bogdanović	Guard	Serbia	Unknown/not awarded		
2019	Luis Scola (2)	Forward	Argentina	Unknown/not awarded		
2019	Evan Fournier	Forward	France	Unknown/not awarded		
2019	Marc Gasol	Center	Spain	Unknown/not awarded		
2023	**Dennis Schröder**	Guard	Germany	Artūrs Žagars	Guard	Latvia
2023	Shai Gilgeous-Alexander	Guard	Canada	Franz Wagner	Forward	Germany
2023	Anthony Edwards	Guard	United States	Simone Fontecchio	Forward	Italy
2023	Bogdan Bogdanović (2)	Guard	Serbia	Jonas Valančiūnas	Center	Lithuania
2023	Luka Dončić	Guard	Slovenia	Nikola Milutinov	Center	Serbia

== Most selections ==
The following table only lists players with more than one total selections.

*	Inducted into the Naismith Memorial Basketball Hall of Fame
**	Inducted into the FIBA Hall of Fame
***	Inducted into both the Naismith and FIBA Halls of Fame
	Denotes player who is still active

Player	Position	Team	Total	First team	Second team	MVP	Tournaments
Wlamir Marques**	Forward	Brazil	3	3	0	1	1954, 1959, 1963, 1970
Oscar Schmidt***	Forward	Brazil	3	3	—	0	1978, 1982, 1986, 1990
Amaury Pasos**	Forward	Brazil	3	2	1	1	1954, 1959, 1963, 1967
Pau Gasol*	Center	Spain	2	2	—	1	2002, 2006, 2014
Krešimir Ćosić***	Center	Yugoslavia	2	2	—	0	1967, 1970, 1974, 1978
Modestas Paulauskas**	Forward	Soviet Union	2	2	—	0	1967, 1970, 1974
Dragan Kićanović**	Guard	Yugoslavia	2	2	—	0	1974, 1978, 1982
Vladimir Tkachenko**	Center	Soviet Union	2	2	—	0	1978, 1982, 1986
Manu Ginóbili*	Guard	Argentina	2	2	—	0	1998, 2002, 2006
Luis Scola	Forward	Argentina	2	2	—	0	2002, 2006, 2010, 2014, 2019
Miloš Teodosić	Guard	Serbia	2	2	—	0	2010, 2014
Bogdan Bogdanović	Guard	Serbia	2	2	0	0	2019, 2023
