= Pedro Bustos =

Argentine basketball player (1927–2024)

Medal record

Representing Argentina

Men's Basketball

FIBA World Cup
Gold medal – first place	1950 Argentina	National Team

Pan American Games
Silver medal – second place	1951 Buenos Aires	National Team

Pedro Bustos (10 November 1927 – 13 July 2024) was an Argentine basketball player. He died on 13 July 2024, at the age of 96.
