= John Stanich =

American basketball player (1925–2020)

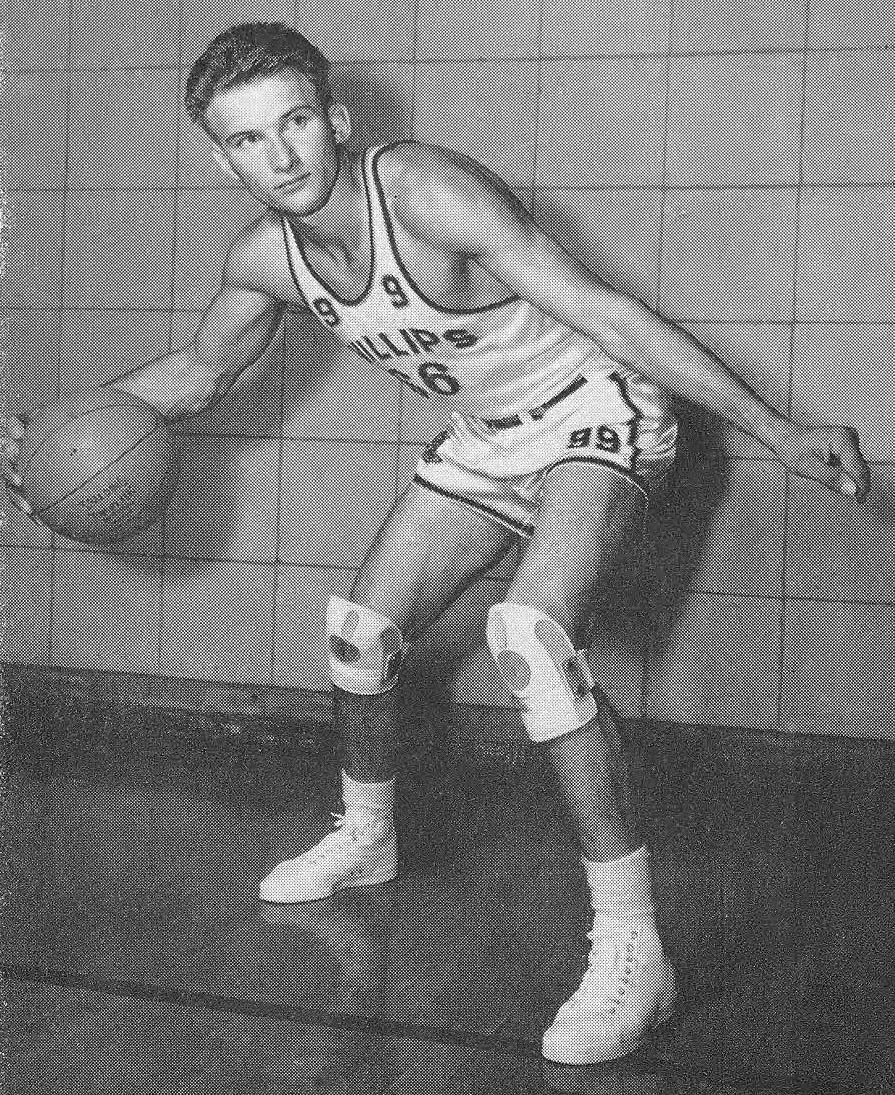
- Stanich with the Phillips 66ers

Personal information
- Born: January 18, 1925 Sacramento, California, U.S.
- Died: April 1, 2020 (aged 95) Houston, Texas, U.S.
- Listed height: 5 ft 10 in (1.78 m)
- Listed weight: 170 lb (77 kg)

Career information
- High school: Sacramento (Sacramento, California)
- College: Sacramento CC (1944–1946); UCLA (1946–1948)
- BAA draft: 1948: 10th round
- Drafted by: New York Knicks
- Position: Guard / forward

Career history
- 1948–1950: Phillips 66ers
- 1950–1951: Denver Chevrolets
- 1951–1952: Denver Central Bankers

Career highlights
- AAU All-American (1949); AP Honorable Mention All-American (1948); First-team All-PCC (1948); NJCAA champion (1946)
- Stats at Basketball Reference
Medals
Men's basketball
Representing the United States
World Championship
Silver medal – second place	1950 Argentina	Team competition

John Stanich (January 18, 1925 – April 1, 2020) was an American basketball player. He was an All-American college player at UCLA and represented the United States in the 1950 FIBA World Championship where he was named to the FIBA Basketball World Cup All-Tournament Team.

== Background ==
At the age of four, Stanich lost three fingers on his left hand when he tried to crank the engine of a Model T, getting tem caught between the crossbar and the crank spring. Stanich graduated from Sacramento High School and attended hometown Sacramento City College. Stanich led the Panthers in scoring in both of his seasons there and as a sophomore in 1945–46 led the Panthers to the junior college national championship. Following his junior college career, Stanich teamed with his younger brother George at UCLA. As a senior in 1947–48, Stanich captained the Bruins squad and was named first team All-Conference and an honorable mention All-American by the Associated Press.

== Career ==
Following the close of his college career, Stanich was drafted by the New York Knicks in the 1948 BAA draft. However, he chose to play for the Phillips Petroleum Company's Amateur Athletic Union (AAU) power Phillips 66ers. Stanich was named an AAU All-American in 1949 and won an AAU championship in 1950. After the season, Stanich moved to the Denver Chevrolets.

Also in 1950, Stanich was named to the United States' team for the inaugural FIBA World Championship (now called the FIBA World Cup). The Americans lost 64–50 to host country Argentina. Stanich finished second on the team in scoring, averaging 7.2 points per game in the tournament, and was the lone American named to the all-tournament team.
