= Rubén Menini =

Argentine basketball player (1924–2020)

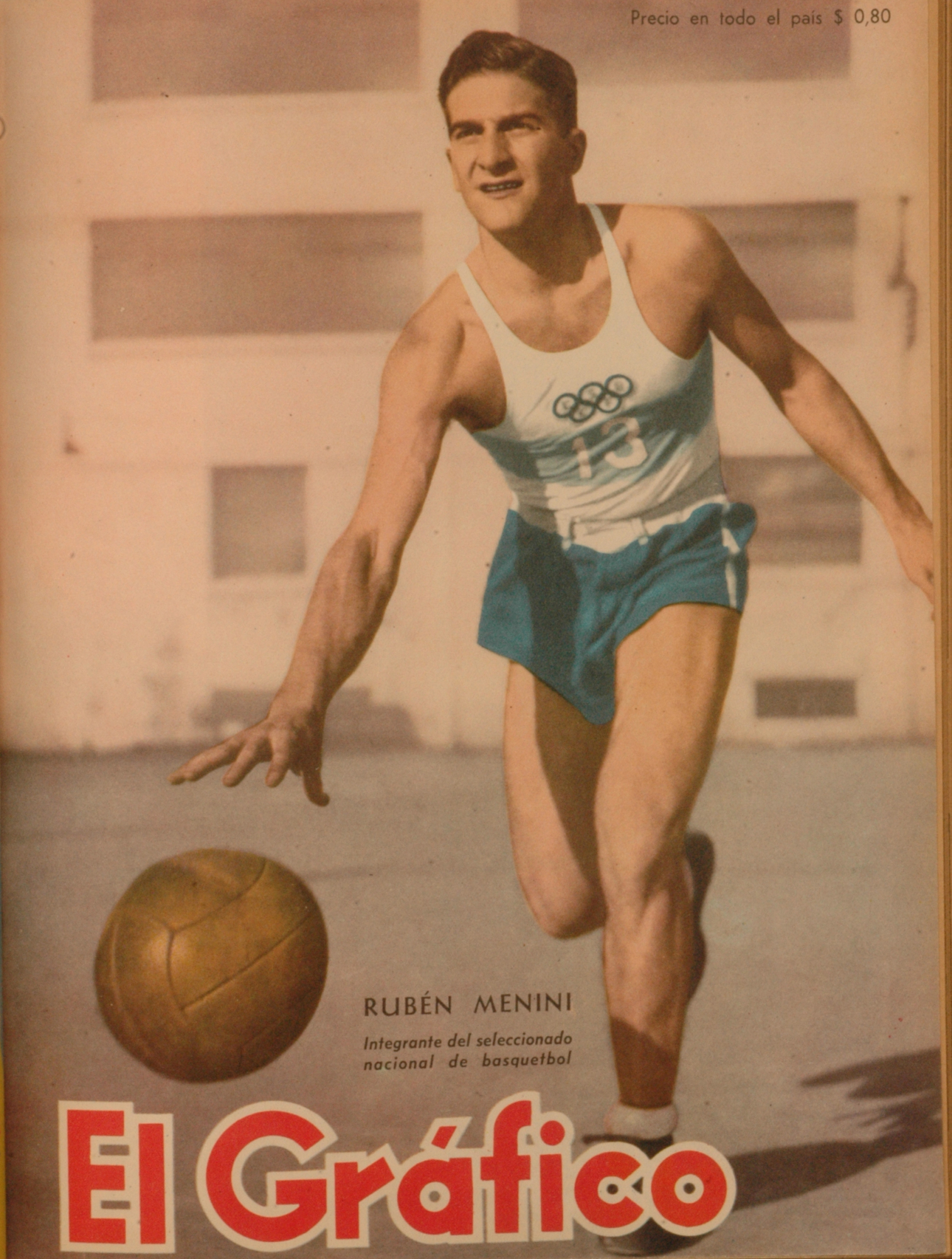
The Graphic of March 09, 1951. Edition 1648

Rubén Francisco Menini (20 February 1924 – 12 April 2020) was an Argentine basketball player who competed in the 1948 Summer Olympics and in the 1952 Summer Olympics. He became world champion in 1950 with the Argentinian National Team. Menini died in April 2020 at the age of 96.
