= Alberto Fernández (basketball) =

Peruvian basketball player (born 1925)

Personal information
- Nationality: Peruvian
- Born: 3 September 1925 Callao, Peru

Sport
- Sport: Basketball

Alberto Fernández Calderón (born 3 September 1925) was a Peruvian basketball player. He competed in the men's tournament at the 1948 Summer Olympics.
