= Jorge Canavesi =

Argentine basketball player and coach

Personal information
- Born: 22 August 1920 Barracas, Buenos Aires, Argentina
- Died: 2 December 2016 (aged 96) Argentina
- Position: Guard

Career history

Playing
- Club Gymnasia y Esgrima de Villa del Parque

Coaching
- Club Gymnasia y Esgrima de Villa del Parque
- 1947: Paraguay
- 1948–1952, 1969–1971, 1980: Argentina
- Club Capital Federal
- Club Catamarca
- Club Estudiantes de La Plata
- Club Gimnasia Esgrima de Buenos Aires
- Club San Fernando

Career highlights
- As player: Argentine Federation League champion (1945); As head coach: 3× Argentine Federation League champion (1945, 1953, 1970)
- FIBA Hall of Fame
Medals
Men's basketball
Head coach for Argentina
FIBA World Cup
Gold medal – first place	1950 Argentina
Pan American Games
Silver medal – second place	1951 Argentina
FIBA South American Championship
Bronze medal – third place	1971 Uruguay

Jorge Hugo Canavesi (22 August 1920 – 2 December 2016) was an Argentine basketball player and coach. He was inducted into the FIBA Hall of Fame, as a coach, in 2016.

== Playing career ==
Canavesi began playing club basketball in Argentina, with the youth teams of Parque Chacabuco, in 1937. In 1941, he began playing club basketball in Argentina, at the senior men's level, with Club Gymnasia y Esgrima de Villa del Parque. With that club, he won the Argentine Federation League championship, as a player-coach, in 1945.

== Coaching career ==
=== Club coaching career ===
At the senior men's club level, Canavesi first worked as a player-coach of the Argentine Club Gymnasia y Esgrima de Villa del Parque. With them, he won an Argentine Federation League championship in 1945. As a head coach, he also won the Argentine Federation League championship with Club Capital Federal, in 1953, and with Club Catamarca, in 1970.

=== National team coaching career ===
Canavesi was the head coach of the senior men's Argentine national basketball team. He was Argentina's head coach at the 1948 Summer Olympics. He then led Argentina to the gold medal at the 1950 FIBA World Championship, which was the first ever edition of the FIBA World Cup.

He also led Argentina to the silver medal at the 1951 Pan American games, and also coached Argentina at the 1952 Summer Olympics. He was also Argentina's head coach at the 1971 Pan American Games, and led them to a bronze medal at the 1971 FIBA South American Championship.

== Personal life ==
Canavesi died in Argentina, on 2 December 2016, at the age of 96.
