= Óscar Furlong =

Argentine basketball player and coach (1927–2018)

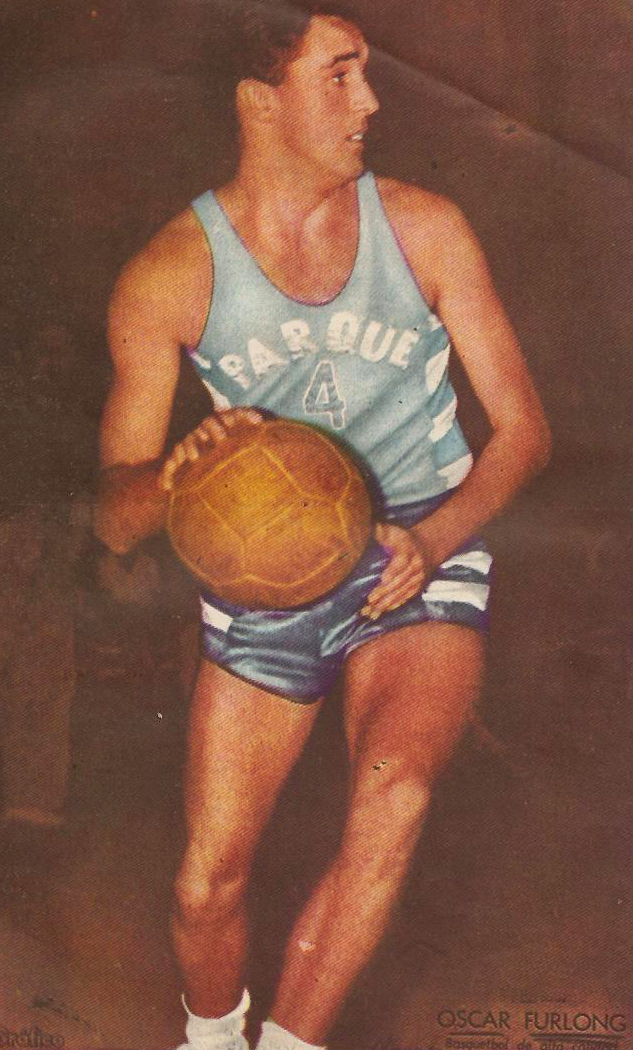
- Furlong, playing with Gimnasia y Esgrima de Villa del Parque, circa 1950–1953.

Personal information
- Born: 22 October 1927 Buenos Aires, Argentina
- Died: 11 June 2018 (aged 90)
- Listed height: 190 cm (6 ft 3 in)
- Listed weight: 84 kg (185 lb)

Career information
- College: SMU (1953–1956)
- Playing career: 1944–1957
- Position: Power forward / center

Career history
- 1944–1957: Gimnasia V. Parque

Career highlights
- As player: FIBA World Cup MVP (1950); 6× Buenos Aires League champion (1945–1948, 1951, 1954)
- FIBA Hall of Fame
Medals
Men's basketball
Representing Argentina
FIBA World Cup
Gold medal – first place	Buenos Aires 1950
Universiade
Gold medal – first place	1953 Dortmund
Pan American Games
Silver medal – second place	1951 Buenos Aires
Silver medal – second place	1955 Mexico City

Óscar Alberto Furlong Chretienneau (22 October 1927 – 11 June 2018) was an Argentine basketball player, and tennis player and coach. He was born in Buenos Aires, Argentina. As a basketball player, he was a FIBA World Cup champion in 1950, who also competed at the 1948 Summer Olympic Games, and at the 1952 Summer Olympic Games. Furlong was inducted into the FIBA Hall of Fame in September 2007.

== Early life and career ==
Nicknamed Pillín and El Primer Crack, Furlong started playing basketball and tennis at the Gymnastics and Tennis Club of Villa del Parque. He later concentrated in basketball, in the youth divisions of Club Gimnasia y Esgrima de Villa del Parque. After his debut with the first team in 1944, Furlong won 6 Torneo Metropolitano Buenos Aires League titles (1945, 1946, 1947, 1948, 1951, and 1954), in the amateur league that was run by the Argentine Basketball Federation. In 1953, Furlong began attending Southern Methodist University, where he played college basketball with the SMU Mustangs. He graduated in 1956, after reaching the 1956 NCAA Final Four, while playing alongside All American, and future NBA player, Jim Krebs.

== National team career ==
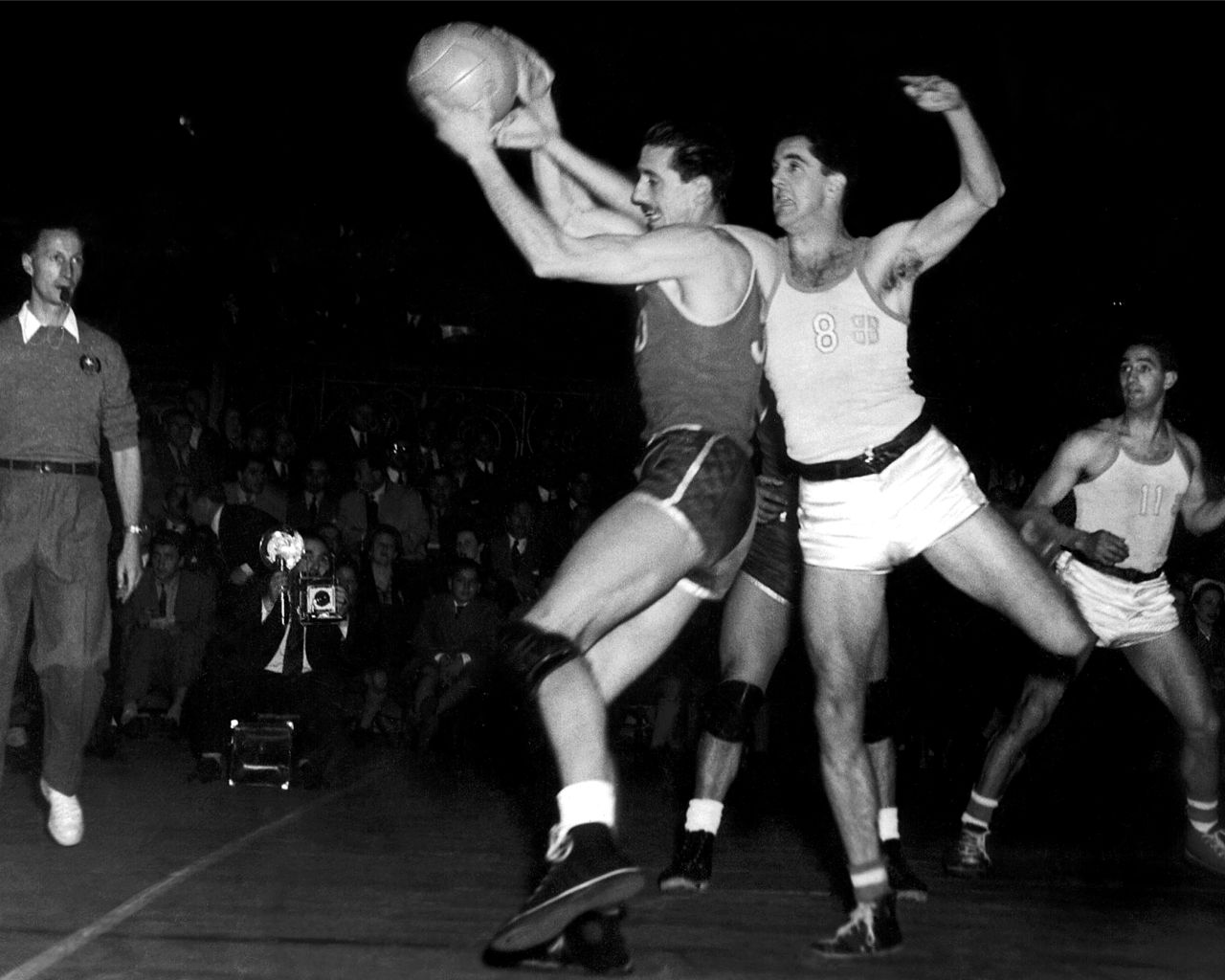
Furlong (#8) fights for control of the ball, at the 1950 FIBA World Championship.

At the 1948 London Summer Olympic Games, after a continued dominance by the United States in the Summer Olympics basketball competition, his 18 points scored, while playing center, helped the senior Argentine national basketball team stay within a basket of the US, during a 59–57 loss. After the game, the United States' head coach, Omar Browning, called him, "one of the finest ball players I ever saw". The Argentine national team finished in fifteenth place in the 1948 Summer Olympics basketball tournament, after not being able to qualify to the eight-team second phase. Afterwards, Furlong also received and declined offers to play in the United States, for the NBA's Minneapolis Lakers, and Baltimore Bullets, and for Adolph Rupp, of the University of Kentucky.

Furlong was a member of the Argentine team that won the gold medal at the 1950 FIBA World Championship, being the second top-scorer, a member of the All-Tournament Team, and the MVP of the tournament. He also scored 20 points in the final against the United States. In the 1951 Pan American Games, he helped Argentina win the silver medal in basketball. At the 1952 Helsinki Summer Olympics, his team earned a fourth-place finish in the basketball tournament, after losing in the semifinals, against the United States, 85–76.

In 1953, after his team won the gold medal at the World University Games, he received a scholarship to play basketball for Southern Methodist University, in the United States. In 1955, he helped the Argentina squad repeat the silver medal result, at the 1955 Pan American Games.

== Retirement from basketball and tennis career ==
In 1957, while playing club basketball for Villa del Parque, Furlong was forced to take an early retirement from the sport, at the age of 30, after the new Argentine military government and Amador Barros Hurtado (President of the Argentine Basketball Federation), made the controversial decision that all members of Argentina's FIBA World Cup team should be considered professional, as they had breached the 'Amateurism Code' of the IOC, after receiving cars as gifts. On 8 January 1957, all the members of the Argentine FIBA World Cup team were banned for life, from participation in basketball. Juan Perón had previously left the country, to escape the coup d'état of his presidency.

Furlong later played tennis, where he eventually attained a seventh place in the Argentine national rankings. In 1966, he joined the committee of the Argentine Tennis Association (AAT), becoming vice-president, and eventually coach of the Argentine Davis Cup team. In 1977, his last year as a tennis coach, his team reached the semifinals of the 1977 Davis Cup.
