= Leopoldo Contarbio =

Argentine basketball player (1927–1993)

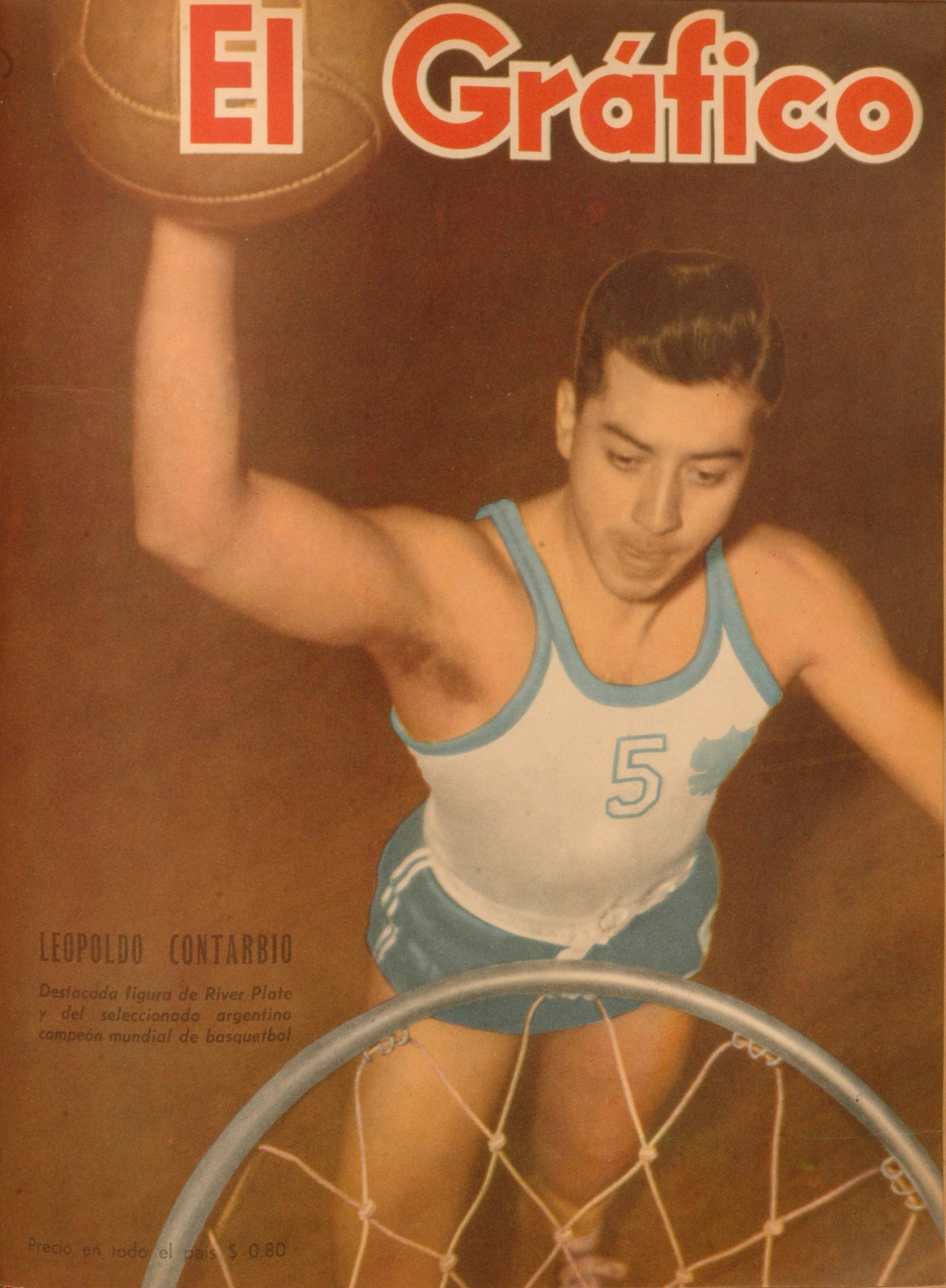

Personal information
- Born: April 29, 1927
- Died: August 24, 1993 (aged 66)
Medal record
Men's basketball
Representing Argentina
FIBA World Cup
Gold medal – first place	1950 Buenos Aires	National Team

Leopoldo ("Pichón") Contarbio (April 29, 1927 – August 24, 1993) was an Argentine basketball player who competed in the 1948 Summer Olympics and in the 1952 Summer Olympics. He was born in Buenos Aires.

In 1948 he was a member of the Argentine basketball team, which finished fifteenth in the 1948 tournament. Four years later he was a member of the basketball team which finished fourth. He played all eight games in the 1952 tournament. His biggest success came when he won the world title at the first World Championship (1950) in his native Buenos Aires.
