= Hugo del Vecchio =

Argentine basketball player

Hugo del Vecchio (22 February 1928 – 7 September 1999) was an Argentine basketball player who competed in the 1952 Summer Olympics.
