= Eduardo Fiestas =

Peruvian basketball player (1925–1987)

Personal information
- Born: 16 June 1925; Lambayeque, Peru
- Died: 9 July 1987 (aged 62); Lima, Pera

Sport
- Sport: Basketball

Eduardo Fiestas Arce (16 June 1925 – 9 July 1987) was a Peruvian basketball player. He competed in the men's tournament at the 1948 Summer Olympics. Fiestas died in Lima on 9 July 1987, at the age of 62.
