= Ricardo Primitivo González =

Argentine basketball player (born 1925)

Ricardo González
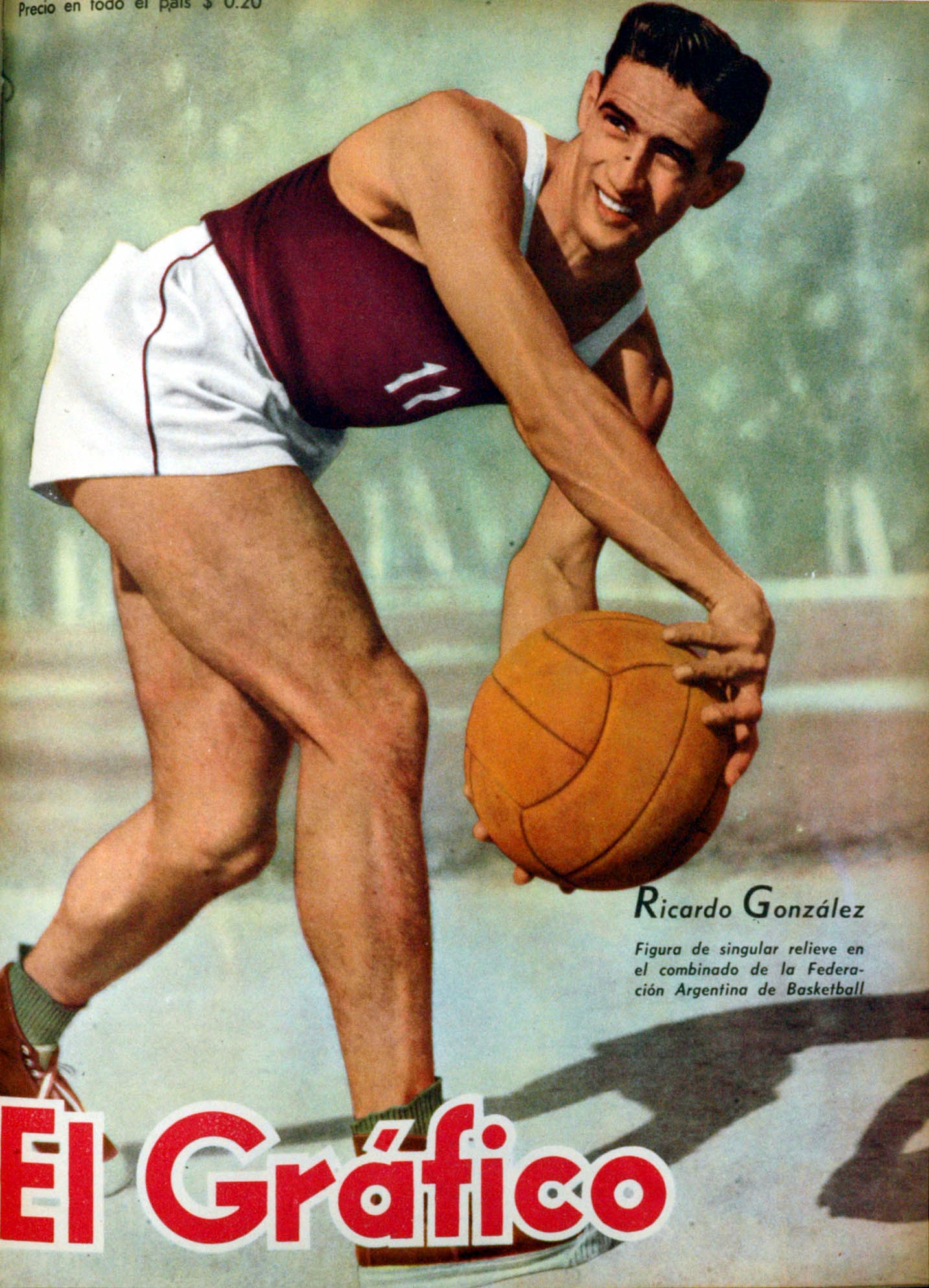
- González in 1947

Personal information
- Born: 12 May 1925 (age 101) Buenos Aires, Argentina
- Listed height: 180 cm (5 ft 11 in)
- Listed weight: 84 kg (185 lb)

Career information
- Playing career: 1947–1956
- Position: Shooting guard
- Number: 11

Career history
- 1948–1949: Santos Lugares
- 1949–1956: Club Atlético Palermo

Career highlights
- As player: 2× Argentine Federation League champion (1947, 1949); Konex Merit Diploma (1980)
- FIBA Hall of Fame
Medals
Men's basketball
Representing Argentina
FIBA World Cup
Gold medal – first place	1950 Argentina
Pan American Games
Silver medal – second place	1951 Argentina
Silver medal – second place	1955 Mexico

Ricardo Primitivo González (born 12 May 1925) is an Argentine former basketball player. In 1980, he received the Konex Merit Diploma, being named one of the 5 best Argentine players of all-time to that point. He was inducted into the FIBA Hall of Fame, in 2009.

== Club career ==
During his club basketball playing career, González played with the Argentine teams Santos Lugares and Club Atlético Palermo, one of the oldest clubs in Palermo.

== National team career ==
With the senior Argentine national basketball team, González played at the 1947 FIBA South American Championship, the 1949 FIBA South American Championship, and the 1955 FIBA South American Championship. He also competed with Argentina at the 1948 Summer Olympics and the 1952 Summer Olympics. He was the team captain of the senior Argentine national team that won the gold medal at the 1950 FIBA World Championship. He was named to the 1950 FIBA World Championship's All-Tournament Team. He also won silver medals at the 1951 Pan American Games, and the 1955 Pan American Games.
