= Alexandre Gemignani =

Brazilian basketball player (1925–1998)

Personal information
- Born: 26 June 1925 São Paulo, Brazil
- Died: 8 March 1998 (aged 72)
Medals
Men's basketball
Representing Brazil
Olympic Games
Bronze medal – third place	1948 London	Team

Alexandre Gemignani Ferreira (26 June 1925 – 8 March 1998) was a Brazilian basketball player who competed in the 1948 Summer Olympics. There he won the bronze medal with the national team under the guidance of head coach Moacyr Daiuto. He was born in São Paulo.
