= Menino =

Menino is a surname. Notable people with the surname include:

- Alexandre Divanei Menino (born 1984), Brazilian futsal player
- Gabriel Menino (born 2000), Brazilian footballer
- Thomas Menino (1942–2014), American politician
