= Alberto López (basketball) =

Argentine basketball player

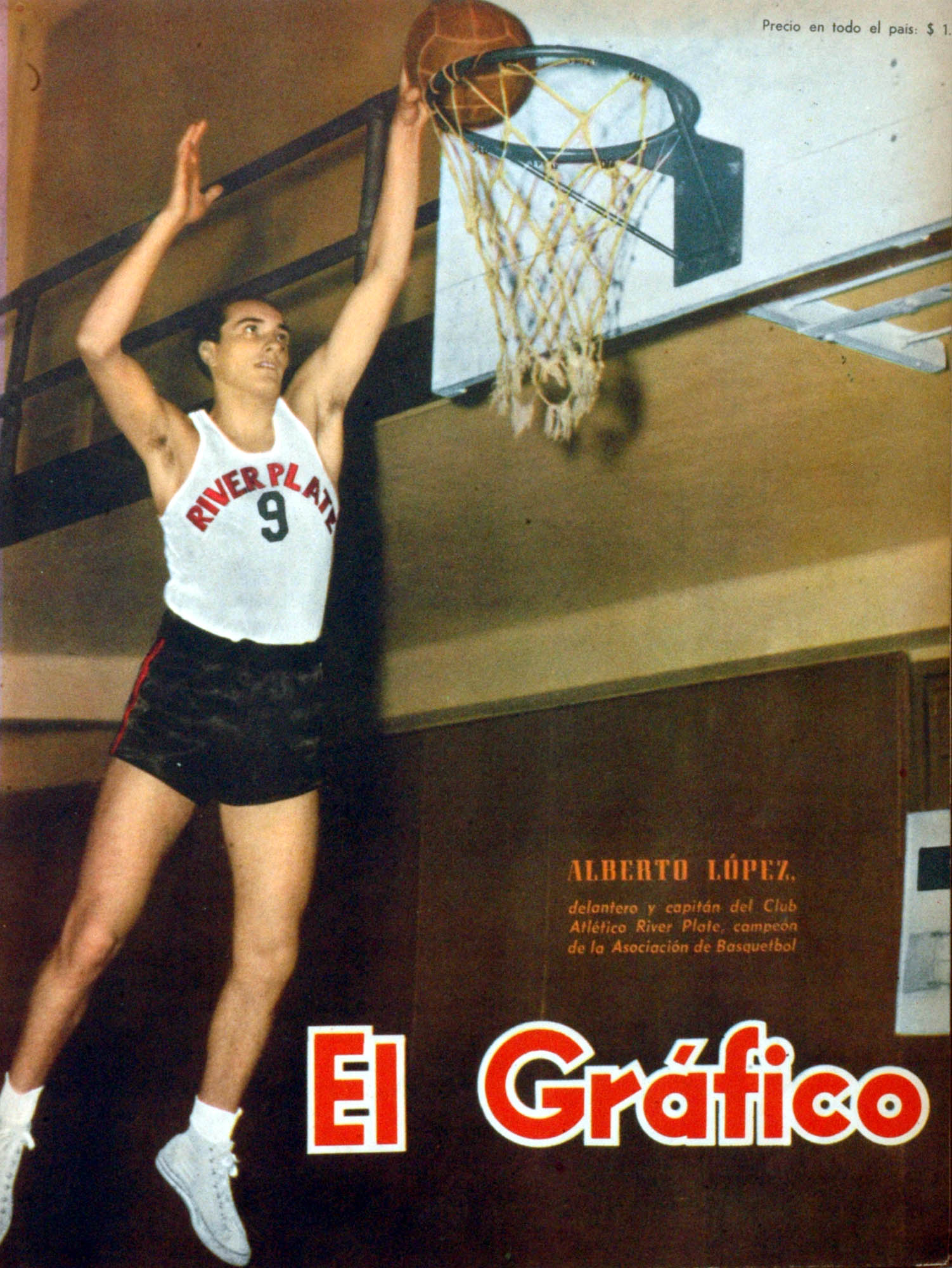
- López in El Gráfico, 1952

Personal information
- Born: 1 November 1926
- Died: 20 March 2003 (aged 76)
- Listed height: 193 cm (6 ft 4 in)
Medals
Men's basketball
Representing Argentina
World Championship
Gold medal – first place	1950 Buenos Aires	Team
Pan American Games
Silver medal – second place	1951 Buenos Aires	Team
Silver medal – second place	1955 Mexico City	Team

Alberto López Fernández (Note: In this Spanish name, the first or paternal surname is López and the second or maternal family name is Fernández.) (1 November 1926 – 20 March 2003) was an Argentine basketball player who competed in the 1952 Summer Olympics.
