= Juan Uder =

Argentine basketball player (1927–2020)

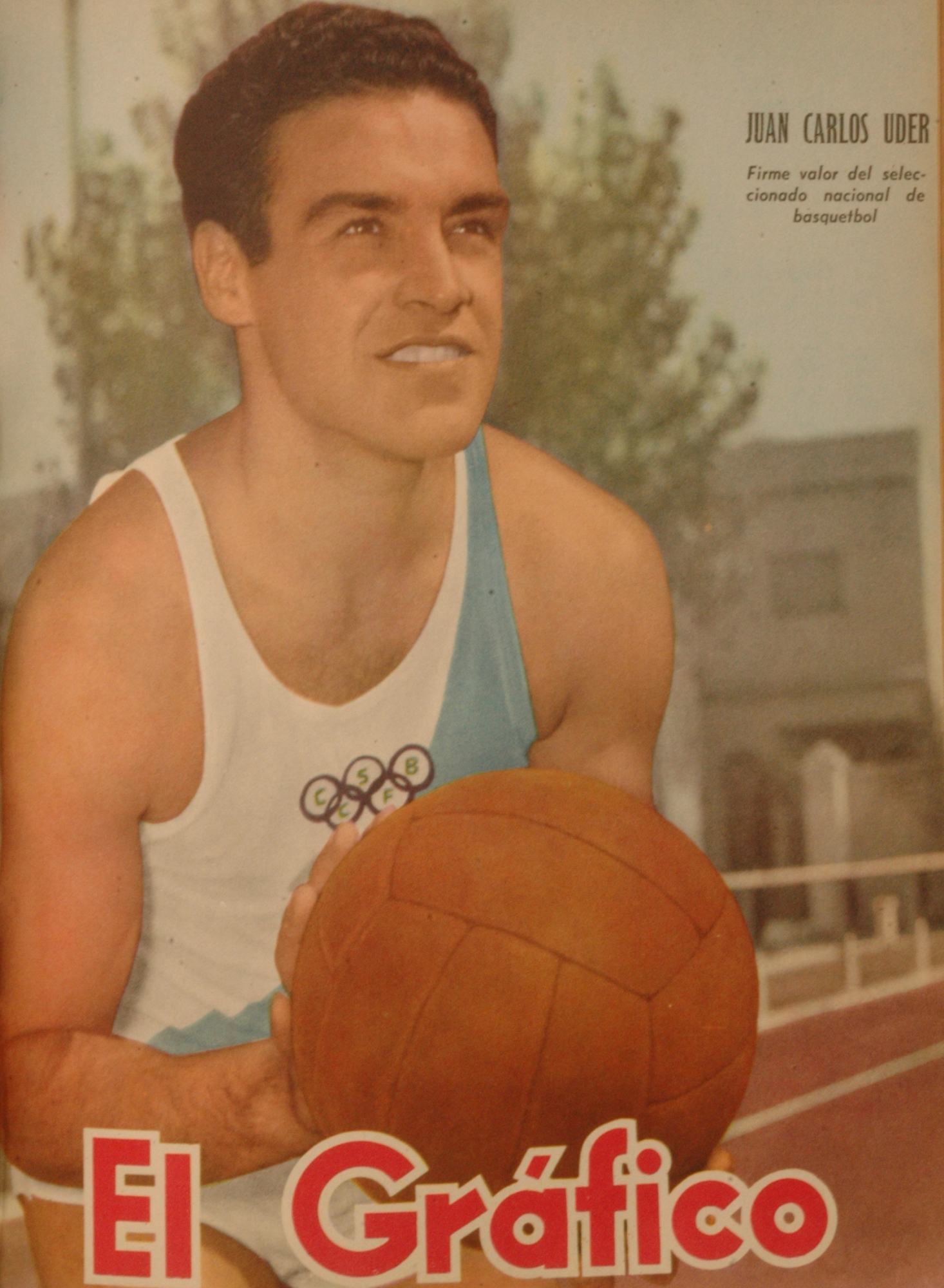
- Juan Carlos Uder in El Gráfico, 1951

Personal information
- Born: 24 April 1927 Sarandí, Buenos Aires, Argentina
- Died: 14 July 2020 (aged 93)
- Listed height: 186 cm (6 ft 1 in)
Medals
Men's basketball
Representing Argentina
World Championship
Gold medal – first place	1950 Buenos Aires	Team
Pan American Games
Silver medal – second place	1951 Buenos Aires	Team
Silver medal – second place	1955 Mexico City	Team

Juan Carlos Uder (24 April 1927 – 14 July 2020) was an Argentine basketball player who competed in the 1948 Summer Olympics and in the 1952 Summer Olympics.
