= Raúl Pérez Varela =

Argentine basketball player

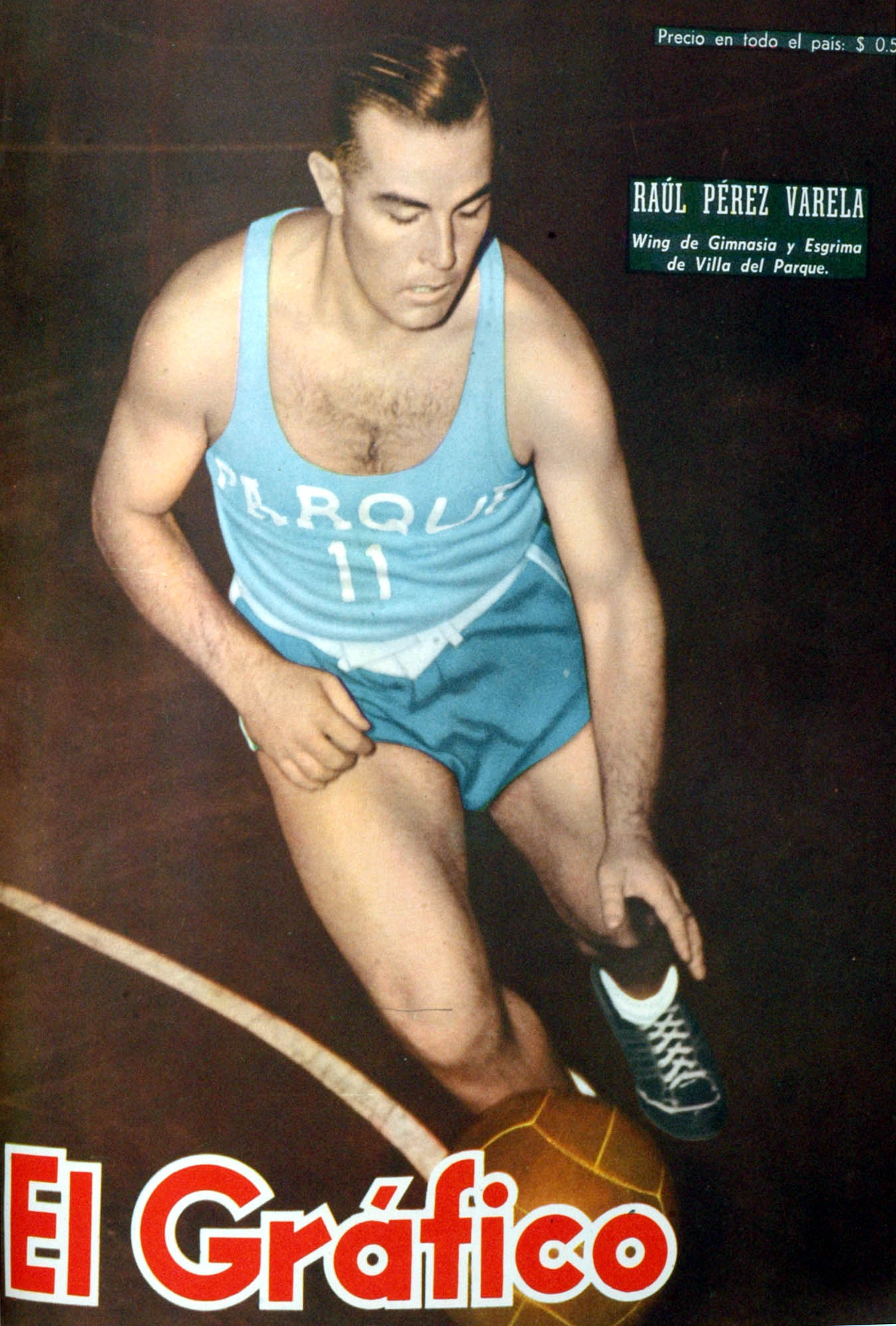
Raúl Pérez Varela

Raúl Pérez Varela (born 16 August 1925, died before 2016) was an Argentine basketball player who competed in the 1952 Summer Olympics.
