= AAU men's basketball records =

This article lists all-time records achieved in the AAU tourney and the local leagues in a few statistical categories. The tournaments organized by the AAU started in 1897 and until the late 1940s included college teams, athletic clubs and company teams. Gale Bishop holds the record for most points scored having netted 62 in the second round of the 1945 tournament in Denver.

Former NBA players such as LeRoy Ellis, Tim Hardaway and Artis Gilmore have played in the masters tournaments, and set several records.

== AAU Scoring records ==
=== AAU tournaments ===
Points	Player	Game	Date
62 pts	Gale Bishop	Fort Lewis Warriors - Hoxie Chamber of Commerce 87-21	3/20/1945 (2nd round)
55 pts	George Bryant	Marathon Oil Lexington - Albuquerque 123-103	4/1/1973 (semifinals)
52 pts	Earl Ledford	Butler YMCA - Fort Lauderdale Y 108-97 (OT)	4/1/1954 (1st round)
50 pts	Gale Bishop	Fort Lewis Reception Center - Butte Boosters 83-37	3/16/1943 (2nd round)
49 pts	Frank Ford	Florida - Oklahoma 83-37	6/21/1982 (1st round)
48 pts	Larry Toburen	Denver University Pioneers - Boise Junior College 77-38	3/18/1940

=== AAU Exhibition Games ===
Points	Player	Game	Date
54 pts	Elgin Baylor	Seattle University Chieftains - Buchan Bakers 84-70	2/11/1957
43 pts	John Williamson	Farmers & Merchants Bank All-Stars - N.C.A.A. Freshmen 112-85	2/9/1971
49 pts	Jeff Cowans	Florida - Arizona Stars	Summer 1999

=== U.S. Olympic Games Fund Benefit Game (AAU sanctioned) ===
Points	Player	Game	Date
43 pts	Johnny O'Brien	Seattle University Chieftains - Harlem Globetrotters 84-70	1/21/1952

=== National A.A.U. Masters (Over-40 Division) ===
Points	Player	Game	Date
51 pts	Tim Hardaway	Miami Chamber Lounge - LCI Lasers 105-87	5/27/2006 (Final)
50 pts	Randy Smith	Durham/Western New York - Iowa 141-105	5/17/1990 (at Coral Springs High, Florida)
49 pts	Artis Gilmore	Orlando Angel's Restaurant - Orlando Lutheran Brotherhood 87-92	5/18/1990 (at Coral Springs City Center, Florida)
42 pts	LeRoy Ellis	Portland East Bank Saloon - Utah Thome Construction 94-97	5/18/1967 (Final) (at Coral Springs High, Florida)

=== National A.A.U. Masters (Over-45 Division) ===
Points	Player	Game	Date
48 pts	LeRoy Ellis	Portland East Bank Saloon - Shelby County All-Stars 112-86	8/18/1995 (Final)
43 pts	LeRoy Ellis	Portland East Bank Saloon - Larkey Insurance 90-74	5/20/1990 (Final)
42 pts	LeRoy Ellis	Portland East Bank Saloon - Bellevue Athletic Club 86-54	5/16/1990 (at Coral Springs High, Florida)

== American Basketball League (AAU) scoring record ==
Points	Player	Game	Date
32 pts	Jim Pollard	San Diego Dons - Salt Lake City Simplot-Deseret News	3/14/1946 (at Denver)

== National Industrial Basketball League (AAU) scoring records ==
Points	Player	Game	Date
56 pts	Jack Adams	Cleveland Pipers - Buchan Bakers	2/15/1961
54 pts	Dick Boushka	Wichita Vickers Oilers - Denver-Chicago Truckers 134-108	2/15/1961
53 pts	Burdie Haldorson	Phillips 66ers - Cleveland Pipers 95-92	2/23/1960
50 pts	Burdie Haldorson	Phillips 66ers - Akron Goodyear 109-105 (OT)	3/12/1958
46 pts	George Bon Salle	Denver D-C Truckers - Buchan Bakers 98-102	11/30/1960
46 pts	Horace Walker	Denver D-C Truckers - Cleveland Pipers 119-120	12/14/1960

== Players with most AAU championships ==
- 6

"Shorty" Carpenter

- 5

Martin Nash

- 4

Jimmy McNatt, Omar Browning, John W. Pariseau, Frank McCabe, Marc Freiberger, Forrest DeBernardi, Willie Rothman, Fred Pralle

- 3

Jay Triano, Bob Kurland, Ron Bontemps, Bob Gruenig, Harold Hewitt, John Gibbons, Jack McCracken, Gerald Tucker, Todd Burton

== International trophies won by AAU teams ==
- FIBA Intercontinental Cup: 1967, 1968, 1969 by Akron Wingfoots
- Merlion Cup (basketball): 1988 by Brewster Heights Packing
