= AAU Men's Basketball All-Americans =

College basketball award

- Awarded for: the best players of each original Amateur Athletic Union's men's basketball seasons
- Country: United States

History
- First award: 1921
- Final award: 1968

The Amateur Athletic Union Men's Basketball All-Americans were players who competed in the Amateur Athletic Union (AAU) between 1920–21 and 1967–68 and were chosen as the best players in the league during their respective seasons. Founded in 1888, the AAU is one of the largest non-profit, volunteer, sports organizations in the United States. It is dedicated exclusively to the promotion and development of amateur sports and physical fitness programs.

The era between 1921 and 1968 is referred to as the "Golden Era" of AAU basketball while companies began vying for players to compete on their teams. There was a great allure to playing AAU basketball besides job security; by remaining in the AAU as opposed to the National Basketball League or American Basketball Association, players were able to retain their "amateur" status. Only amateurs were allowed to compete in the Olympic Games, and many AAU basketball alumni went on to compete for the United States during their careers.

During this time period, thirty-three AAU All-Americans played on the United States men's national basketball team in seven different Olympic Games: Joe Fortenberry, Carl Knowles, Frank Lubin, Art Mollner, Bill Wheatley (1936); Don Barksdale, Bud Browning, Shorty Carpenter, Bob Kurland, R. C. Pitts, Cab Renick (1948); Ron Bontemps, Bob Kurland, Frank McCabe, Dan Pippin, Howie Williams (1952); Dick Boushka, Chuck Darling, Burdie Haldorson, Bob Jeangerard, K. C. Jones, Ron Tomsic, Gerry Tucker, Jim Walsh (1956); Bob Boozer, Burdie Haldorson, Adrian Smith (1960); Larry Brown, Les Lane, Jerry Shipp (1964); and Mike Barrett, John Clawson, Calvin Fowler, Jim King and Mike Silliman (1968).

Eleven AAU All-Americans have also been enshrined in the Naismith Memorial Basketball Hall of Fame as players. These players include Roger Brown, Ace Gruenig, Richie Guerin, Chuck Hyatt, K. C. Jones, Bob Kurland, Hank Luisetti, Jack McCracken, Andy Phillip, Jim Pollard, and George Yardley. Two other AAU All-Americans have been enshrined in other roles: Don Barksdale as a contributor and Larry Brown as a coach.

== All-Americans by season ==
| Season | Player | Team |
|---|---|---|
| 1920–21 | Edmund Cairns | Southwestern College (KS) |
| 1920–21 | Forrest DeBernardi | Kansas City Athletic Club |
| 1920–21 | Vincent Keyes | Southwestern College (KS) |
| 1920–21 | Milton Singer | Kansas City Athletic Club |
| 1920–21 | Bonnie Stewart | Northwestern Normal (Alva, OK) |
| 1921–22 | George "Pidge" Browning | Kansas City Athletic Club |
| 1921–22 | Forrest DeBernardi | Kansas City Athletic Club |
| 1921–22 | George Hess | Kansas City Athletic Club |
| 1921–22 | George Reeves | Lowe & Campbell (Kansas City) |
| 1921–22 | George Williams | Lowe & Campbell (Kansas City) |
| 1922–23 | George "Pidge" Browning | Kansas City Athletic Club |
| 1922–23 | George Reeves | Kansas City Athletic Club |
| 1922–23 | Robert Sanders | Kansas City Athletic Club |
| 1922–23 | Milton Singer | Kansas City Athletic Club |
| 1922–23 | George Williams | Kansas City Athletic Club |
| 1923–24 | Richard Berndt | San Francisco Olympic Club |
| 1923–24 | George "Pidge" Browning | Kansas City Athletic Club |
| 1923–24 | Haldane Griggs | Butler University |
| 1923–24 | Paul Jones | Butler University |
| 1923–24 | George Reeves | Kansas City Athletic Club |
| 1923–24 | George Williams | Kansas City Athletic Club |
| 1924–25 | Tusten Ackerman | Kansas City Athletic Club |
| 1924–25 | Arthur Brewster | Washburn College |
| 1924–25 | Forrest DeBernardi | Hillyard Chemical (MO) |
| 1924–25 | George Hess | Kansas City Schooleys |
| 1924–25 | George Starbuck | Hillyard Chemical (MO) |
| 1925–26 | Tusten Ackerman | Kansas City Athletic Club |
| 1925–26 | Forrest DeBernardi | Hillyard Chemical (MO) |
| 1925–26 | George Starbuck | Hillyard Chemical (MO) |
| 1925–26 | Verne Wilkins | Kansas City Athletic Club |
| 1925–26 | John Wulf | Hillyard Chemical (MO) |
| 1926–27 | Forrest DeBernardi | Hillyard Chemical (MO) |
| 1926–27 | Harold Hewitt | Hillyard Chemical (MO) |
| 1926–27 | Elmer Hooker | Ke-Nash-A (Kenosha, WI) |
| 1926–27 | Ross McBurney | University of Wichita |
| 1926–27 | George Starbuck | Hillyard Chemical (MO)) |
| 1927–28 | Ed Hogue | Kansas City Athletic Club |
| 1927–28 | Victor Holt | Cook Paint (Kansas City) |
| 1927–28 | Al Peterson | Cook Paint (Kansas City) |
| 1927–28 | George Starbuck | Hillyard Chemical (Saint Joseph, MO) |
| 1927–28 | Frank "Buck" Weaver | Kansas City Athletic Club |
| 1928–29 | Floyd Burk | Cook Paint (Kansas City) |
| 1928–29 | Berry Dunham | Henry Clothiers (Wichita) |
| 1928–29 | Frank Harrigan | Cook Paint (Kansas City) |
| 1928–29 | Victor Holt | Cook Paint (Kansas City) |
| 1928–29 | Ross McBurney | Henry Clothiers (Wichita) |
| 1928–29 | Al Peterson | Cook Paint (Kansas City) |
| 1929–30 | Floyd Burk | Wichita Henrys |
| 1929–30 | Bart Carlton | East Central Teachers (Ada, OK) |
| 1929–30 | Raymond Maloney | San Francisco Olympic Club |
| 1929–30 | Melvin Miller | Wichita Henrys |
| 1929–30 | Frank Wilson | San Francisco Olympic Club |
| 1930–31 | Merle Alexander | Wichita Henrys |
| 1930–31 | Paul Burks | Kansas City Athletic Club |
| 1930–31 | Berry Dunham | Wichita Henrys |
| 1930–31 | Chuck Hyatt | Los Angeles Athletic Club |
| 1930–31 | Melvin Miller | Wichita Henrys |
| 1930–31 | Frank "Buck" Weaver | Kansas City Athletic Club |
| 1931–32 | Berry Dunham | Wichita Henrys |
| 1931–32 | Jack McCracken | Maryville Teachers (MO) |
| 1931–32 | Tom Merrick | Maryville Teachers (MO) |
| 1931–32 | Tom Pickell | Wichita Henrys |
| 1931–32 | William Young | Schussler Athletic Club (Chicago) |
| 1932–33 | Paul Burks | Southern Kansas City Stage Lines |
| 1932–33 | Berry Dunham | Wichita Henrys |
| 1932–33 | Chuck Hyatt | Tulsa Diamond DX Oilers |
| 1932–33 | Carl Larson | Tulsa Diamond DX Oilers |
| 1932–33 | Joe Reiff | Rosenberg–Avery (Chicago) |
| 1933–34 | Bart Carlton | Tulsa Diamond DX Oilers |
| 1933–34 | Arthur Hamon | University of Wyoming |
| 1933–34 | Chuck Hyatt | Tulsa Diamond DX Oilers |
| 1933–34 | Ed McGinty | Tulsa Diamond DX Oilers |
| 1933–34 | Tom Pickell | Tulsa Diamond DX Oilers |
| 1934–35 | Bud Browning | Southern Kansas Stage Lines |
| 1934–35 | Herman Fischer | Southern Kansas Stage Lines |
| 1934–35 | Joe Fortenberry | McPherson Globe Refiners |
| 1934–35 | Chuck Hyatt | Hollywood Universal Pictures |
| 1934–35 | Francis Johnson | McPherson Globe Refiners |
| 1935–36 | Bud Browning | Kansas City Santa Fe Trails |
| 1935–36 | Joe Fortenberry | McPherson Globe Refiners |
| 1935–36 | Carl Knowles | Hollywood Universal Pictures |
| 1935–36 | Jay Wallenstrom | Kansas City Santa Fe Trails |
| 1935–36 | Bill Wheatley | McPherson Globe Refiners |
| 1936–37 | Tex Colvin | Denver Safeway Stores |
| 1936–37 | Ace Gruenig | Denver Safeway Stores |
| 1936–37 | Jack McCracken | Denver Safeway Stores |
| 1936–37 | Jack Ozburn | Kansas City Santa Fe Trails |
| 1936–37 | Jay Wallenstrom | Bartlesville (OK) Phillips 66ers |
| 1937–38 | Herman Fischer | Kansas City Healey Motors |
| 1937–38 | Frank Groves | Kansas City Healey Motors |
| 1937–38 | Ace Gruenig | Denver Safeway Stores |
| 1937–38 | Jack McCracken | Denver Safeway Stores |
| 1937–38 | Dick Smith | Wichita Gridleys |
| 1938–39 | Ray Ebling | Bartlesville (OK) Phillips 66ers |
| 1938–39 | Ace Gruenig | Denver Nuggets |
| 1938–39 | Jack Hupp | Hollywood Metro-Goldwyn-Mayer |
| 1938–39 | Jack McCracken | Denver Nuggets |
| 1938–39 | Dick Wells | Denver Nuggets |
| 1939–40 | Tee Connelley | Denver Nuggets |
| 1939–40 | Joe Fortenberry | Bartlesville (OK) Phillips 66ers |
| 1939–40 | Ace Gruenig | Denver Nuggets |
| 1939–40 | Grady Lewis | Bartlesville (OK) Phillips 66ers |
| 1939–40 | Doc Lockard | Bartlesville (OK) Phillips 66ers |
| 1940–41 | Chet Carlisle | Oakland Athens Athletic Club |
| 1940–41 | Ralph Giannini | San Francisco Olympic Club |
| 1940–41 | Carl Knowles | Hollywood 20th Century Fox |
| 1940–41 | Frank Lubin | Hollywood 20th Century Fox |
| 1940–41 | Hank Luisetti | San Francisco Olympic Club |
| 1941–42 | Ace Gruenig | Denver American Legion |
| 1941–42 | Hank Luisetti | Bartlesville (OK) Phillips 66ers |
| 1941–42 | Bill Martin | Bartlesville (OK) Phillips 66ers |
| 1941–42 | Jack McCracken | Denver American Legion |
| 1941–42 | Bill Strannigan | Denver American Legion |
| 1942–43 | Shorty Carpenter | Bartlesville (OK) Phillips 66ers |
| 1942–43 | Bob Doll | Denver American Legion |
| 1942–43 | Ace Gruenig | Denver American Legion |
| 1942–43 | Jimmy McNatt | Bartlesville (OK) Phillips 66ers |
| 1942–43 | Kenny Sailors | University of Wyoming |

| Season | Player | Team |
|---|---|---|
| 1943–44 | Ed Beisser | Colorado Springs Army |
| 1943–44 | Gale Bishop | Fircrest Dairy |
| 1943–44 | Shorty Carpenter | Bartlesville (OK) Phillips 66ers |
| 1943–44 | Ace Gruenig | Denver Ambrose-Legion |
| 1943–44 | George Hamburg | Denver Ambrose-Legion |
| 1943–44 | Chuck Hyatt | Denver Ambrose-Legion |
| 1943–44 | Bob Marsh | Denver Ambrose-Legion |
| 1943–44 | Jimmy McNatt | Bartlesville (OK) Phillips 66ers |
| 1943–44 | Fred Pralle | Bartlesville (OK) Phillips 66ers |
| 1943–44 | Jule Rivlin | Wyoming Ft. Warren |
| 1944–45 | Gale Bishop | Washington Ft. Lewis Warriors |
| 1944–45 | Shorty Carpenter | Bartlesville (OK) Phillips 66ers |
| 1944–45 | Frank Fullmer | Idaho Simplots |
| 1944–45 | Ace Gruenig | Denver Ambrose Jellymakers |
| 1944–45 | George Hamburg | Denver Ambrose Jellymakers |
| 1944–45 | Paul Lindemann | Bartlesville (OK) Phillips 66ers |
| 1944–45 | Frank Lubin | Hollywood 20th Century Fox |
| 1944–45 | Jack McCracken | Denver Ambrose Jellymakers |
| 1944–45 | Jimmy McNatt | Bartlesville (OK) Phillips 66ers |
| 1944–45 | Dick Smith | Wichita Cessna Aircraft |
| 1945–46 | Shorty Carpenter | Bartlesville (OK) Phillips 66ers |
| 1945–46 | Tee Connelley | San Diego Dons |
| 1945–46 | Ace Gruenig | Denver Ambrose Jellymakers |
| 1945–46 | Bill Martin | Bartlesville (OK) Phillips 66ers |
| 1945–46 | Jimmy McNatt | Bartlesville (OK) Phillips 66ers |
| 1945–46 | Art Mollner | Hollywood 20th Century Fox |
| 1945–46 | Marty Nash | Bartlesville (OK) Phillips 66ers |
| 1945–46 | Andy Phillip | Fleet Marine Force |
| 1945–46 | Jim Pollard | San Diego Dons |
| 1945–46 | Kenny Sailors | San Diego Dons |
| 1946–47 | Vince Boryla | Denver Nuggets |
| 1946–47 | Bill Calhoun | Oakland Bittners |
| 1946–47 | Shorty Carpenter | Bartlesville (OK) Phillips 66ers |
| 1946–47 | Jimmy Darden | Denver Nuggets |
| 1946–47 | Bob Kurland | Bartlesville (OK) Phillips 66ers |
| 1946–47 | Ron Livingstone | Oakland Bittners |
| 1946–47 | Paul Napolitano | Oakland Bittners |
| 1946–47 | Marty Nash | Bartlesville (OK) Phillips 66ers |
| 1946–47 | Jim Pollard | Oakland Bittners |
| 1946–47 | Cab Renick | Bartlesville (OK) Phillips 66ers |
| 1947–48 | Don Barksdale | Oakland Bittners |
| 1947–48 | Vince Boryla | Denver Nuggets |
| 1947–48 | Jimmy Darden | Denver Nuggets |
| 1947–48 | Ace Gruenig | Denver Murphy Mahoney |
| 1947–48 | Bob Kurland | Bartlesville (OK) Phillips 66ers |
| 1947–48 | Roy Lipscomb | Denver Nuggets |
| 1947–48 | Les O'Gara | Oakland Bittners |
| 1947–48 | R. C. Pitts | Bartlesville (OK) Phillips 66ers |
| 1947–48 | Cab Renick | Bartlesville (OK) Phillips 66ers |
| 1947–48 | Warren Taulbee | Oakland Bittners |
| 1948–49 | Don Barksdale | Oakland Bittners |
| 1948–49 | Chuck Hanger | Oakland Bittners |
| 1948–49 | Harold Howey | Denver Chevrolets |
| 1948–49 | Bob Kurland | Bartlesville (OK) Phillips 66ers |
| 1948–49 | Roy Lipscomb | Bartlesville (OK) Phillips 66ers |
| 1948–49 | Les O'Gara | Oakland Bittners |
| 1948–49 | John Stanich | Bartlesville (OK) Phillips 66ers |
| 1948–49 | Gerry Tucker | Bartlesville (OK) Phillips 66ers |
| 1948–49 | Bill Vandenburgh | Seattle Alpine Dairy |
| 1948–49 | Paul Whalen | Peoria Cats |
| 1949–50 | Don Barksdale | Oakland Bittners |
| 1949–50 | Shorty Carpenter | Denver Chevrolets |
| 1949–50 | Chuck Hanger | Denver Blue 'n Gold Atlas |
| 1949–50 | Thornton Jenkins | Denver Chevrolets |
| 1949–50 | Bob Kurland | Bartlesville (OK) Phillips 66ers |
| 1949–50 | Roy Lipscomb | Bartlesville (OK) Phillips 66ers |
| 1949–50 | Dave Minor | Denver Blue 'n Gold Atlas |
| 1949–50 | Les O'Gara | Los Angeles Police |
| 1949–50 | Gerry Tucker | Bartlesville (OK) Phillips 66ers |
| 1949–50 | Andy Wolfe | San Francisco Stewart Chevrolets |
| 1950–51 | Glen Anderson | Ft. Collins (CO) Poudre Valley Creamery |
| 1950–51 | Don Barksdale | Oakland Blue 'n Gold Atlas |
| 1950–51 | Cliff Crandall | San Francisco Stewart Chevrolets |
| 1950–51 | Bill Gossett | Ft. Collins (CO) Poudre Valley Creamery |
| 1950–51 | Bob Kurland | Bartlesville (OK) Phillips 66ers |
| 1950–51 | Frankie Kuzara | San Francisco Stewart Chevrolets |
| 1950–51 | Frank McCabe | Peoria Cats |
| 1950–51 | Ken Pryor | Bartlesville (OK) Phillips 66ers |
| 1950–51 | Howie Williams | Peoria Cats |
| 1950–51 | George Yardley | San Francisco Stewart Chevrolets |
| 1951–52 | Billy Donovan | Los Angeles Fibber McGee & Mollys |
| 1951–52 | Bryce Heffley | Air Force All-Stars |
| 1951–52 | Bob Kurland | Bartlesville (OK) Phillips 66ers |
| 1951–52 | Frank McCabe | Peoria Cats |
| 1951–52 | Dan Pippin | Peoria Cats |
| 1951–52 | Ken Pryor | Bartlesville (OK) Phillips 66ers |
| 1951–52 | Jack Stone | Los Angeles Fibber McGee & Mollys |
| 1951–52 | Bobby Wallace | Air Force All-Stars |
| 1951–52 | Bus Whitehead | Bartlesville (OK) Phillips 66ers |
| 1951–52 | Howie Williams | Peoria Cats |
| 1952–53 | Glen Anderson | San Diego Grihalva Motors |
| 1952–53 | John Arndt | Los Alamitos Naval Air Station |
| 1952–53 | Ron Bontemps | Peoria Cats |
| 1952–53 | Hugh Faulkner | San Diego Grihalva Motors |
| 1952–53 | Jim Hoverder | San Diego Grihalva Motors |
| 1952–53 | Frank McCabe | Peoria Cats |
| 1952–53 | Chet Noe | Eugene (OR) Everybody's Drug |
| 1952–53 | Dan Pippin | Peoria Cats |
| 1952–53 | Howie Williams | Peoria Cats |
| 1952–53 | George Yardley | Los Alamitos Naval Air Station |
| 1953–54 | Glen Anderson | San Diego Grihalva Motors |
| 1953–54 | Ron Bontemps | Peoria Cats |
| 1953–54 | Chuck Darling | Bartlesville (OK) Phillips 66ers |
| 1953–54 | Jim Hoverder | San Diego Grihalva Motors |
| 1953–54 | Frankie Kuzara | Denver Central Bankers |
| 1953–54 | Ken Leslie | San Diego Grihalva Motors |
| 1953–54 | Frank McCabe | Peoria Cats |
| 1953–54 | Dick Retherford | Peoria Cats |
| 1953–54 | Glen Smith | Denver Central Bankers |
| 1953–54 | Joe Stratton | San Diego Grihalva Motors |
| 1954–55 | Jim Bingham | Quantico Marines |
| 1954–55 | Chuck Darling | Bartlesville (OK) Phillips 66ers |
| 1954–55 | Richie Guerin | Quantico Marines |
| 1954–55 | Burdie Haldorson | Boulder (CO) Luckett-Nix Clippers |
| 1954–55 | Bob Jeangerard | Boulder (CO) Luckett-Nix Clippers |
| 1954–55 | Charlie Mock | Boulder (CO) Luckett-Nix Clippers |
| 1954–55 | Ken Sears | San Francisco Olympic Club |
| 1954–55 | Arnold Short | Bartlesville (OK) Phillips 66ers |
| 1954–55 | Ron Tomsic | San Francisco Olympic Club |
| 1954–55 | Jim Walsh | Bartlesville (OK) Phillips 66ers |

| Season | Player | Team |
|---|---|---|
| 1955–56 | Chuck Darling | Bartlesville (OK) Phillips 66ers |
| 1955–56 | Dick Eicher | Denver Central Bankers |
| 1955–56 | Burdie Haldorson | Bartlesville (OK) Phillips 66ers |
| 1955–56 | Jerry Harper | Houston Ada Oilers |
| 1955–56 | Chuck Koon | Seattle Buchan Bakers |
| 1955–56 | George Linn | Houston Ada Oilers |
| 1955–56 | Dick Miller | Milwaukee Allen-Bradleys |
| 1955–56 | Terry Rand | Milwaukee Allen-Bradleys |
| 1955–56 | George Swyers | Seattle Buchan Bakers |
| 1955–56 | Jim Walsh | Bartlesville (OK) Phillips 66ers |
| 1956–57 | B. H. Born | Peoria Cats |
| 1956–57 | Barry Brown | San Francisco Olympic Club |
| 1956–57 | Dick Boushka | U.S. Air Force All-Stars |
| 1956–57 | Howie Crittenden | Peoria Cats |
| 1956–57 | Russ Lawler | San Francisco Olympic Club |
| 1956–57 | R. C. Owens | Seattle Buchan Bakers |
| 1956–57 | Bill Reigel | Lake Charles (LA) McDonald Scotts |
| 1956–57 | Ron Tomsic | U.S. Air Force All-Stars |
| 1956–57 | Dick Welsh | U.S. Air Force All-Stars |
| 1956–57 | Carroll Williams | U.S. Army All-Stars |
| 1957–58 | Jim Ashmore | Denver-Chicago Truckers |
| 1957–58 | B. H. Born | Peoria Cats |
| 1957–58 | Barry Brown | Denver-Chicago Truckers |
| 1957–58 | Howie Crittenden | Peoria Cats |
| 1957–58 | Burdie Haldorson | Bartlesville (OK) Phillips 66ers |
| 1957–58 | K. C. Jones | Ft. Leonard (MO) Wood |
| 1957–58 | Jim Palmer | Peoria Cats |
| 1957–58 | Bill Reigel | Lake Charles (LA) McDonald Scotts |
| 1957–58 | Harv Schmidt | Denver-Chicago Truckers |
| 1957–58 | Gary Thompson | Bartlesville (OK) Phillips 66ers |
| 1958–59 | Jack Adams | U.S. Army All-Stars |
| 1958–59 | Don Boldebuck | Wichita Vickers |
| 1958–59 | Dick Boushka | Wichita Vickers |
| 1958–59 | Burdie Haldorson | Bartlesville (OK) Phillips 66ers |
| 1958–59 | Les Lane | Wichita Vickers |
| 1958–59 | Adrian Smith | U.S. Army All-Stars |
| 1958–59 | Jack Sulivan | U.S. Marine All-Stars |
| 1958–59 | Dan Swartz | Wichita Vickers |
| 1958–59 | Gary Thompson | Bartlesville (OK) Phillips 66ers |
| 1958–59 | Ron Tomsic | San Francisco Olympic Club |
| 1959–60 | Bob Boozer | Peoria Cats |
| 1959–60 | Howie Crittenden | Peoria Cats |
| 1959–60 | Jim Francis | Akron Goodyears |
| 1959–60 | Red Murrell | Bartlesville (OK) Phillips 66ers |
| 1959–60 | Don Ohl | Peoria Cats |
| 1959–60 | Bill Reigel | Akron Goodyears |
| 1959–60 | Charlie Slack | Akron Goodyears |
| 1959–60 | Rolland Todd | Seattle Buchan Bakers |
| 1959–60 | Ben Warley | Cleveland Pipers |
| 1959–60 | Carroll Williams | Seattle Buchan Bakers |
| 1960–61 | Jack Adams | Cleveland Pipers |
| 1960–61 | Tony Jackson | New York Tapers |
| 1960–61 | Les Lane | Denver-Chicago Truckers |
| 1960–61 | Tom Meschery | San Francisco Olympic Club |
| 1960–61 | Mike Moran | Denver-Chicago Truckers |
| 1960–61 | Paul Neumann | New York Tapers |
| 1960–61 | Dan Swartz | Cleveland Pipers |
| 1960–61 | Roger Taylor | Cleveland Pipers |
| 1960–61 | Horace Walker | Denver-Chicago Truckers |
| 1960–61 | Ben Warley | Cleveland Pipers |
| 1961–62 | Joe Belmont | Denver-Chicago Truckers |
| 1961–62 | Dennis Boone | Denver-Chicago Tuckers |
| 1961–62 | Roger Brown | Inland Manufacturing |
| 1961–62 | Pete McCaffrey | Akron Goodyears |
| 1961–62 | Bill McGill | Sanders State Line |
| 1961–62 | Mike Moran | Denver-Chicago Truckers |
| 1961–62 | Denny Price | Bartlesville (OK) Phillips 66ers |
| 1961–62 | Bill Reigel | Akron Goodyears |
| 1961–62 | Jerry Shipp | Bartlesville (OK) Phillips 66ers |
| 1961–62 | Gary Thompson | Bartlesville (OK) Phillips 66ers |
| 1962–63 | Dennis Boone | Denver-Chicago Tuckers |
| 1962–63 | Bennie Coffman | Akron Goodyears |
| 1962–63 | Carney Crisler | Denver-Chicago Truckers |
| 1962–63 | Bill Green | Denver-Chicago Truckers |
| 1962–63 | Jim Hagan | Bartlesville (OK) Phillips 66ers |
| 1962–63 | Don Kojis | Bartlesville (OK) Phillips 66ers |
| 1962–63 | Pete McCaffrey | Akron Goodyears |
| 1962–63 | Cleveland McKinney | U.S. Army All-Stars |
| 1962–63 | Denny Price | Bartlesville (OK) Phillips 66ers |
| 1962–63 | Jerry Shipp | Bartlesville (OK) Phillips 66ers |
| 1963–64 | Charley Bowerman | Bartlesville (OK) Phillips 66ers |
| 1963–64 | Bill Bradley | Tennessee State University |
| 1963–64 | Larry Brown | Akron Goodyears |
| 1963–64 | Ed Correll | Federal Old Line |
| 1963–64 | Jim Hagan | Bartlesville (OK) Phillips 66ers |
| 1963–64 | Jim Lyon | Sav-On Stores |
| 1963–64 | Pete McCaffrey | Akron Goodyears |
| 1963–64 | Willie Porter | Tennessee State University |
| 1963–64 | Lloyd Sharrar | Akron Goodyears |
| 1963–64 | Jerry Shipp | Bartlesville (OK) Phillips 66ers |
| 1964–65 | Vern Benson | U.S. Armed Forces All-stars |
| 1964–65 | Larry Brown | Akron Goodyears |
| 1964–65 | Al Dillard | Denver Capitol Federal |
| 1964–65 | Rod Holst | Denver Capitol Federal |
| 1964–65 | Ollie Johnson | San Francisco Athletic Club |
| 1964–65 | Ron Reid | U.S. Armed Forces All-Stars |
| 1964–65 | Randy Richardson | Denver Capitol Federal |
| 1964–65 | Flynn Robinson | Denver Capitol Federal |
| 1964–65 | Dave Stallworth | Arkansas City May Builders |
| 1964–65 | Cecil Tuttle | Akron Goodyears |
| 1965–66 | Vern Benson | Akron Goodyears |
| 1965–66 | Ray Bob Carey | Bartlesville (OK) Phillips 66ers |
| 1965–66 | Leon Clark | Denver Capitol Federal |
| 1965–66 | Ollie Darden | Detroit Ford Mustangs |
| 1965–66 | Clyde Lee | Knoxville (TN) Contac Caps |
| 1965–66 | Bobby Rascoe | Bartlesville (OK) Phillips 66ers |
| 1965–66 | Kendall Rhine | Bartlesville (OK) Phillips 66ers |
| 1965–66 | Cazzie Russell | Detroit Ford Mustangs |
| 1965–66 | Harold Sergent | Bartlesville (OK) Phillips 66ers |
| 1965–66 | Lonnie Wright | Denver Capitol Federal |
| 1966–67 | John Beasley | Bartlesville (OK) Phillips 66ers |
| 1966–67 | Vern Benson | Akron Goodyears |
| 1966–67 | Byron Beck | Denver Capitol Federal |
| 1966–67 | Ed Correll | Akron Goodyears |
| 1966–67 | Calvin Fowler | Akron Goodyears |
| 1966–67 | Donnie Freeman | Chicago Jamaco Saints |
| 1966–67 | Steve Jones | Chicago Jamaco Saints |
| 1966–67 | Jim King | Akron Goodyears |
| 1966–67 | Bob Rule | Denver Capitol Federal |
| 1966–67 | Harold Sergent | Bartlesville (OK) Phillips 66ers |
| 1967–68 | Carl Ashley | Denver Capitol Federal |
| 1967–68 | Mike Barrett | U.S. Armed Forces All-Stars |
| 1967–68 | Tom Black | Akron Goodyears |
| 1967–68 | George Carter | U.S. Armed Forces All-Stars |
| 1967–68 | John Clawson | U.S. Armed Forces All-Stars |
| 1967–68 | Calvin Fowler | Akron Goodyears |
| 1967–68 | Gary Lechman | Spokane (WA) Vaughn Realty |
| 1967–68 | Rod McDonald | Spokane (WA) Vaughn Realty |
| 1967–68 | Mike Silliman | U.S. Armed Forces All-Stars |
| 1967–68 | Jerry Skaife | Spokane (WA) Vaughn Realty |

== Most selections ==
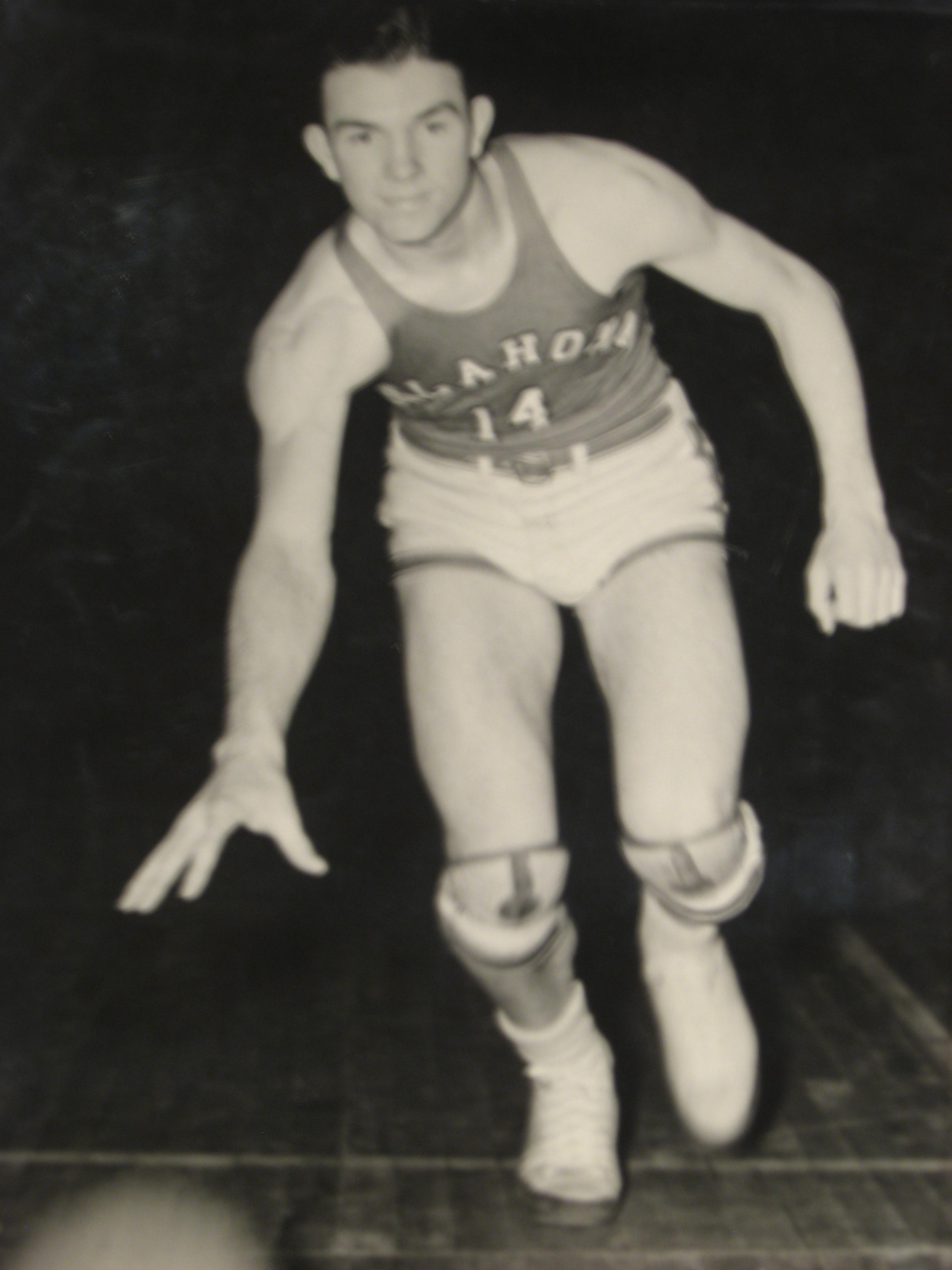
Jimmy McNatt earned four All-America selections (1943–1946).

This is a list for all of the All-Americans who received the honor at least three times.

10 selections

- Ace Gruenig

7–9 selections

- None

6 selections

- Shorty Carpenter, Bob Kurland, Jack McCracken

5 selections

- Forrest DeBernardi, Chuck Hyatt

4 selections

- Don Barksdale, Berry Dunham, Burdie Haldorson, Frank McCabe, Jimmy McNatt, Bill Reigel, George Starbuck

3 selections

- Glen Anderson, Vern Benson, George "Pidge" Browning, Howie Crittenden, Chuck Darling, Joe Fortenberry, Roy Lipscomb, Pete McCaffrey, Les O'Gara, George Reeves, Gary Thompson, Ron Tomsic, Jerry Shipp, George Williams, Howie Williams

== See also ==
- NCAA Men's Basketball All-Americans – similar honor presented to men's basketball players in NCAA Division I competition
