= Henry's (clothiers) =

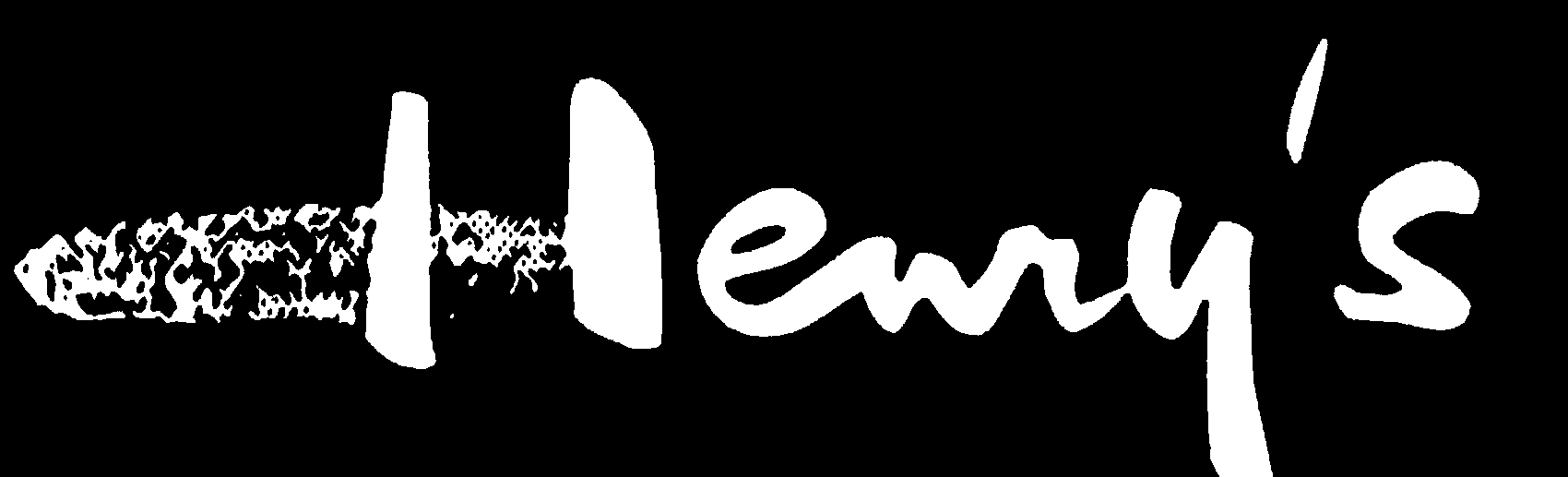
- Formerly: B. Levitt & Sons
- Industry: clothing retailer
- Founded: 1911
- Founder: Bernard Levitt
- Headquarters: Wichita, Kansas
- Key people: Henry Levitt; Leo Levitt; Isadore Levitt

Henry's was a family-owned clothing retailer in Wichita, Kansas from 1911 until 1993.

The store sponsored the Henry Clothiers basketball team which won three consecutive national Amateur Athletic Union championships in 1930-1932 at a time when colleges, corporate-sponsored teams, and private athletic clubs competed in the same tournament.

== Store history ==
The franchise was founded as B. Levitt & Sons in 1911 by Russian immigrant Bernard Levitt.

After Bernard died his sons Henry (1894-June 20, 1968), Leo (known as Buddy)(died 1978) and Isadore (1898-1985) Levitt renamed the business Henry's. He opened a new store at 420 E. Douglas two blocks west of the original store. A 1929 renovation included Wichita's first large neon store.

In 1948 a store opened at Broadway and William. It was followed by one in 1954 at Douglas and Oliver which eventually expanded to two stores across from each other (referred to at the time as "Twin Corners"). During the 1970s it opened in the Twin Lakes Shopping Center, Towne East Square and in the early 1980s it opened a store at Towne West Square. In 1982 it closed the Twin Lakes store, the downtown store in 1984 and the Towne West store in 1988.

== Henry Clothiers basketball ==
Henry Levitt organize the Henry Clothiers basketball team in 1928–29 to provide around Barry Dunham and Ross McBurney who were on the 1925 Wichita High School East team that won the state championship as well as the National Interscholastic Basketball Tournament in Chicago. The two had gone to Wichita State University where it placed third and McBurney was named to the 1927 NCAA Men's Basketball All-Americans team. Levitt lured the two along with another WSU player Harold Davis. Dutch Lonborg coached the team to an AAU title game at Convention Hall in Kansas City where it lost to Cook's Paint 51–35.

In the 1929–30 season, the team won the national championship in Kansas City under new coach Gene Johnson (a former WSU coach) defeating San Francisco Olympic Club 29–16 in Kansas City. Playing on that team was Tex Gibbons.

In the 1930–31 season, the team lost two of its players including Gibbons to Phillips Petroleum. In order to maintain amateur status, players were required to be employees of the companies that sponsored him. Levitt would eventually not be able to keep up with Phillips in competition for players. The team defeated the Los Angeles Athletic Club coached by Chuck Hyatt 33–20 in the semifinals and defeated the Kansas City Athletic Club 38–14 in the finals in Kansas City.

In the 1931–32 season, the team defeated Northwest Missouri State University 15–14 in Kansas City. Northwest coached by Hank Iba and starring Jack McCracken had defeated the team earlier in the season.

In the 1932–33 season, the team played an expanded season of 50 games. It placed third in the national tournament losing to Diamond DX Oilers, 34-20 in the semifinals but beat Southern Kansas Stage Lines, 26–24 in third place game.

Levitt quit sponsoring the team after the 1933 season.

In 1968 after Henry died, the WSU Fieldhouse at Wichita State University was renamed Levitt Arena. The arena was subsequently renamed in 2003 for Charles G. Koch who donated $6 million for its renovation.
