= Jimmy McNatt =

American basketball player (1918–2000)

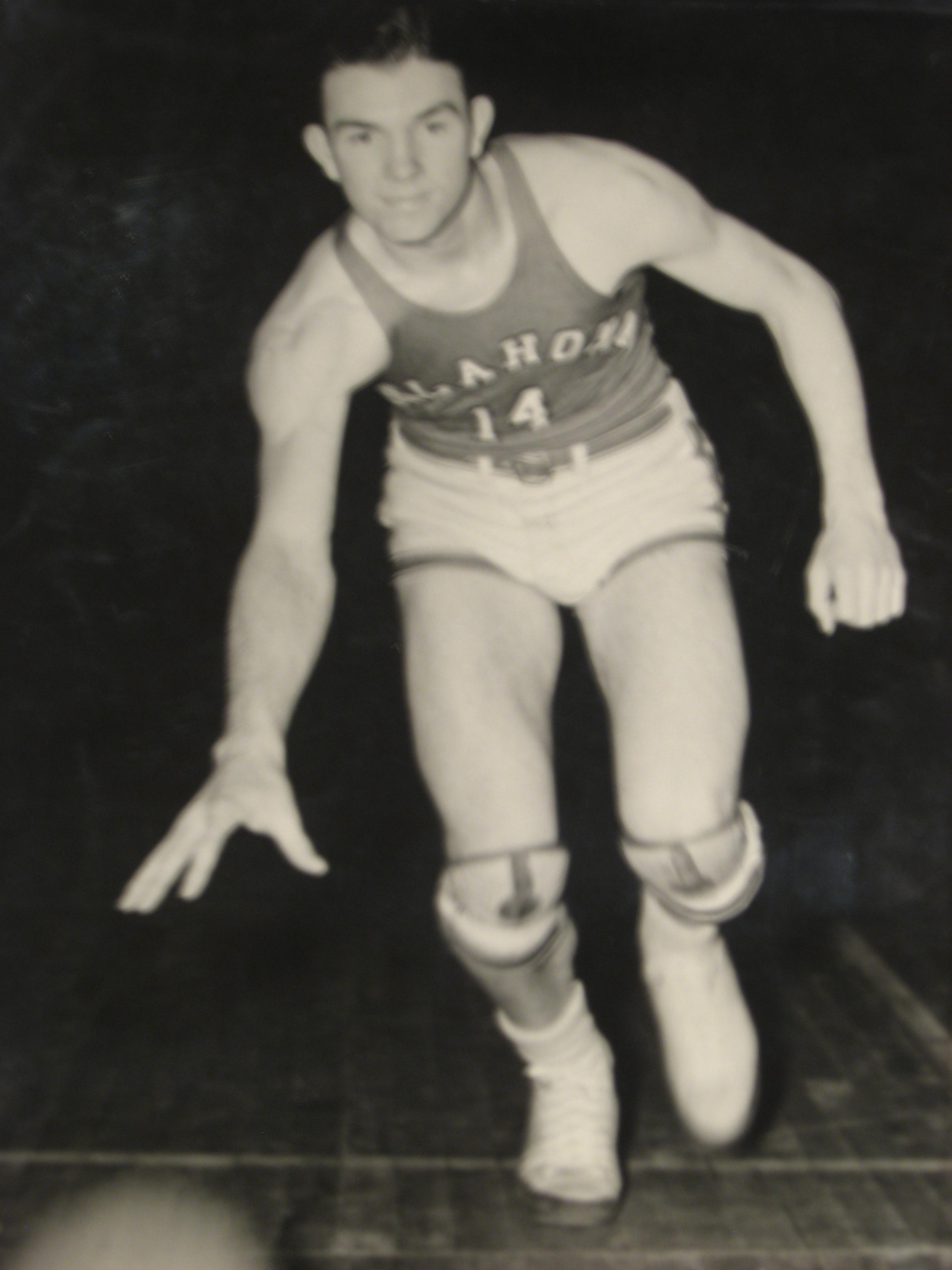
- McNatt during his senior season at Oklahoma

Personal information
- Born: December 19, 1918 Lindsay, California, U.S.
- Died: December 23, 2000 (aged 82) Midland, Texas, U.S.
- Listed height: 6 ft 0 in (1.83 m)
- Listed weight: 170 lb (77 kg)

Career information
- High school: Norman (Norman, Oklahoma)
- College: Oklahoma (1937–1940)
- Playing career: 1940–1947
- Position: Guard
- Number: 22, 9, 77

Career history
- 1940–1947: Phillips 66ers

Career highlights
- 4× AAU All-American (1943–1946); 4× AAU national champion (1943–1946); Consensus second-team All-American (1940); Third-team All-American – Converse (1939); 3× All-Big Six Conference (1938–1940)

James Carlos McNatt (December 19, 1918 – December 23, 2000) was an All-American basketball player for the Oklahoma Sooners and the AAU's Phillips 66ers. At Oklahoma, McNatt led his team to the first-ever NCAA final Four in 1939, and at Phillips 66, McNatt guided the 66ers (also called the "Oilers") to four consecutive AAU national championships (1943, 1944, 1945, and 1946). He was a two-time All-American at Oklahoma (1939, 1940) and a four-time AAU All-American for Phillips 66 (1943, 1944, 1945, 1946). The speedy player came to be known by his nickname “Scat” McNatt, a moniker originally traced back to the term “Boy Scats” which sportswriters had used to describe McNatt's fast-breaking, sophomore-led 1937-38 Oklahoma Sooners basketball team. McNatt grew up in Norman, Oklahoma, attended Norman High School, and then opted to stay in his hometown to play basketball for the University of Oklahoma.

During his collegiate career at Oklahoma, McNatt broke the Big Six Conference single-game scoring record on two occasions. As a junior, he set the mark with 29 points against Iowa State University on February 18, 1939. Then as a senior, he broke his own record with 30 points against Nebraska on February 9, 1940. Another of Oklahoma's conference rivals in the Big Six was the University of Kansas, coached by the legendary Phog Allen. McNatt's Sooners teams were coached by Hugh McDermott and Bruce Drake and won back-to-back Big Six Conference championships in McNatt's junior (1938–39) and senior (1939–40) seasons. McNatt was the conference's leading scorer during the 1939-40 season.

In the 1939 NCAA Division I men's basketball tournament, McNatt led his team to the first-ever Final Four. He topped all scorers with 12 points in the national quarterfinals (“Western Regional semifinal”) as the Sooners defeated Utah State 50-39. In the national semifinal (“Western Regional final”) against the University of Oregon, McNatt was again the Sooners’ leading scorer with 12 points as the Sooners fell to the eventual-champion Ducks. Both games were played in San Francisco at the 1939 Golden Gate International Exposition. To advance to the Western Regional, the Big Six Conference Champion Sooners first had to defeat Missouri Valley Conference Champion Oklahoma A&M, coached by Hank Iba and led by Jesse Renick, on a neutral court in Oklahoma City one week earlier.

After graduating from Oklahoma, McNatt moved on to a career in Amateur Athletic Union basketball, an early basketball league that preceded the National Basketball Association. Though runners up in the 1942 AAU National Tournament with a team featuring McNatt and former Stanford star Hank Luisetti, Phillips 66 won the next four consecutive AAU National Championships, led by the play of McNatt and Gordon Carpenter, both of whom were selected to the AAU All-America teams during these four seasons. In 1943 and 1944, the 66ers defeated Denver's American Legion team 57-40 and then 50-43 in the tournament-final games. In the 1945 championship game, a 47-46 win over Denver Ambrose, McNatt led Phillips 66 in scoring with 15 points, outdueling Denver star Robert Gruenig. In McNatt's final season, Phillips 66 defeated the San Diego Dons by the score of 45-34 in the AAU championship game.

McNatt was inducted into the Helms Athletic Foundation's Basketball Hall of Fame in 1960.

After his basketball career, McNatt worked as a petroleum engineer for the Phillips Petroleum Company, and held numerous supervisory and management positions at Phillips for his entire career, retiring July 1, 1980.

== Photos ==
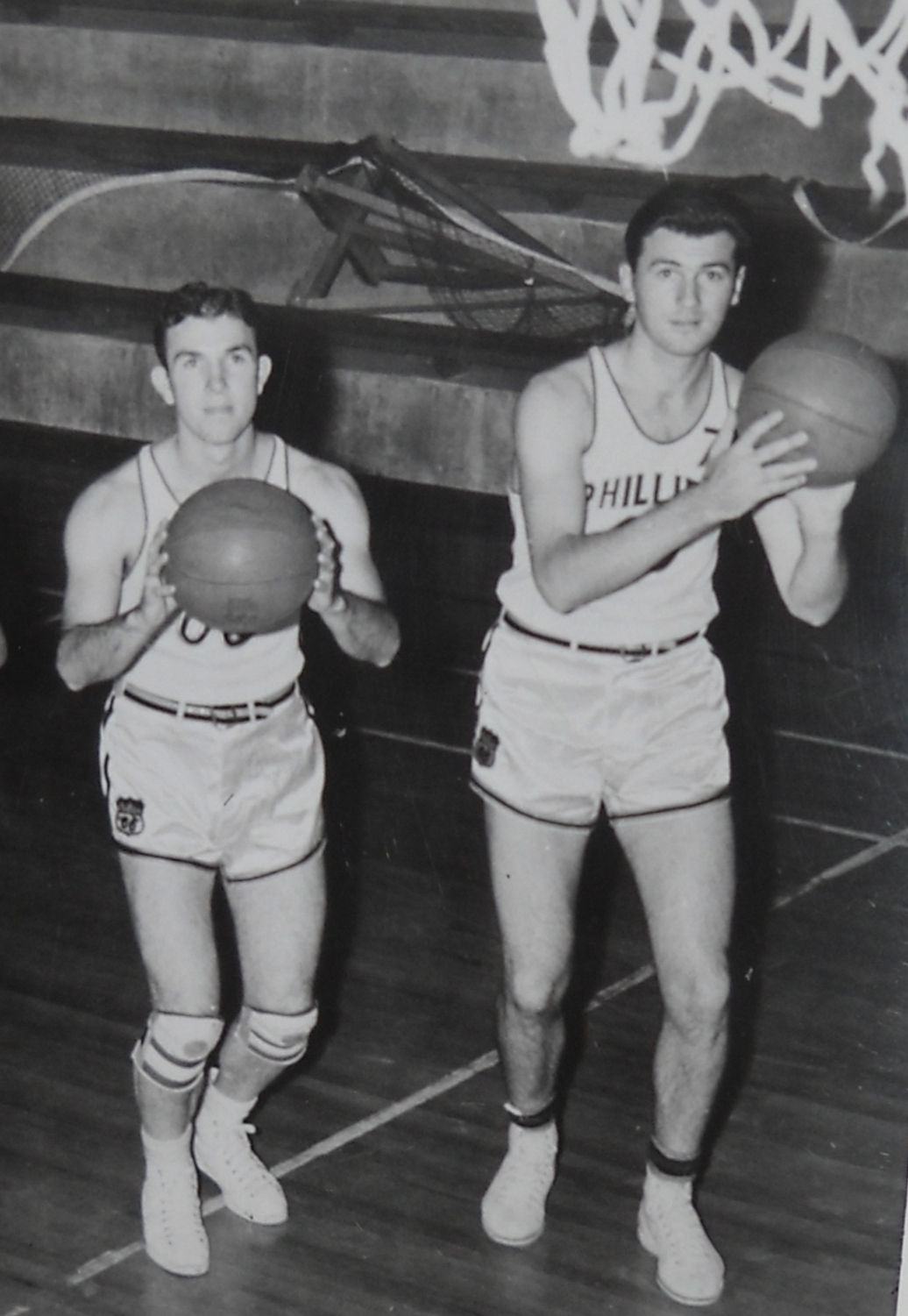
Jimmy McNatt (left) and Hank Luisetti (right), Phillips 66ers teammates, during the 1941-42 AAU basketball season.

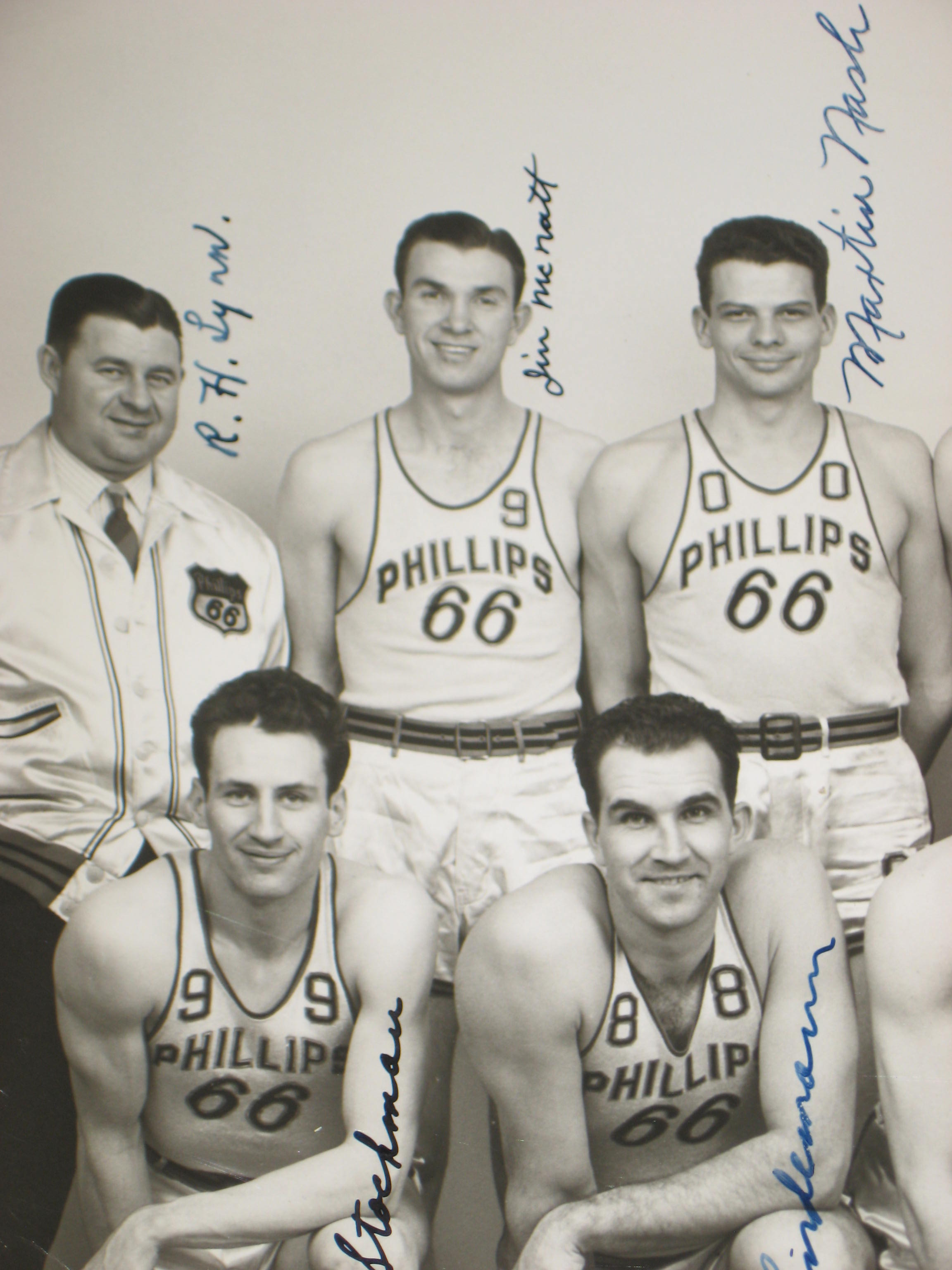
Photograph of Jimmy McNatt (jersey #9), from a team picture of the 1944–45 AAU National Champion Phillips 66ers.

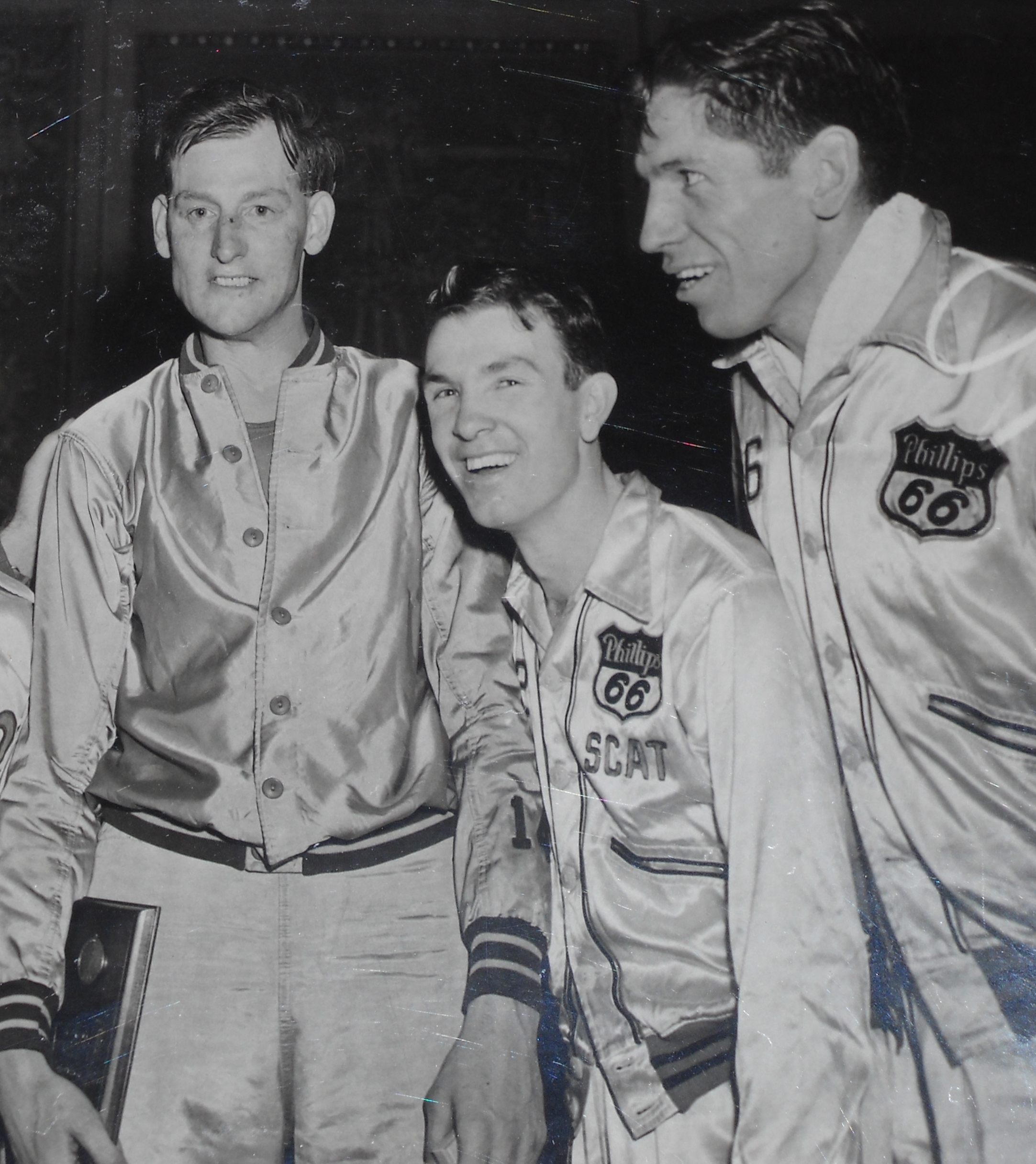
AAU All-Americans Robert "Ace" Gruenig (left), Jimmy "Scat" McNatt (center) and Gordon "Shorty" Carpenter (right).
