= Milton Whitehead =

Milton Whitehead may refer to:

- Milt Whitehead (1862–1901), Major League Baseball player for the St. Louis Maroons and Kansas City Cowboys in 1884
- Milton "Bus" Whitehead (1928–2010), American college and Amateur Athletic Union standout basketball player in the 1950s
