= Al Peterson =

American basketball player

Personal information
- Born: c. 1906 Kansas City, Kansas, U.S.
- Listed height: 6 ft 3 in (1.91 m)
- Listed weight: 180 lb (82 kg)

Career information
- High school: Argentine (Argentine, Kansas)
- College: Kansas (1924–1927)
- Position: Center

Career history
- 1927–??: Cook's Paint

Career highlights
- 2× AAU All-American (1928, 1929); 2x AAU champion (1928, 1929); Consensus NCAA All-American (1926); 3× First-team all-MVC (1925–1927); No. 36 jersey retired by Kansas Jayhawks

Albert Peterson (c. 1906 – 19??) was an American basketball player known for his collegiate career at the University of Kansas in the 1920s. He was a three-time first-team all-Missouri Valley Conference player in each of his three varsity seasons from 1924–25 through 1926–27. Peterson led the Jayhawks to three straight conference championships and led the league in scoring his final two years at 9.1 points and 10.3 points per game, respectively. In his junior season, the Helms Athletic Foundation named him a consensus NCAA All-American. In addition to basketball, Peterson also lettered in football at Kansas during the 1925 season. His basketball number was eventually retired by the school.

Peterson, a Kansas City, Kansas native, played Amateur Athletic Union (AAU) basketball for his hometown's Cook's Painters. He was twice named an AAU All-American in 1928 and 1929.
