= Kansas City Athletic Club =

Coordinates: 39.114418°N 94.631778°W

The Kansas City Athletic Club
- Type: Private club
- Founded: Kansas City, Missouri, 1887
- Headquarters: 845 Armstrong Avenue, Kansas City, Missouri

The Kansas City Athletic Club was an athletic club and gentlemen's club in downtown Kansas City, Missouri. Notable members included President Harry S. Truman and others.

== Founding ==
The club was founded in 1887 by Arthur E. Stillwell as the Fairmount Cycling Club, a bicycling club in Fairmount Park in Kansas City. In 1893, the club changed its name to the Kansas City Athletic Club. In the early 20th century, it was nationally known for fielding championship Amateur Athletic Union teams.

== Amateur basketball ==
Beginning in the early 1900s, the club's amateur basketball team, the Blue Diamonds, became a nationally known powerhouse, notably after defeating the Buffalo Germans in 1905 - the de facto national basketball champion who had won the championship at the 1904 World's Fair in St. Louis. Phog Allen was one of the club's team's star players. The Blue Diamonds defeated both the University of Kansas in its 1898-99 inaugural season and the University of Missouri in its 1906-07 inaugural season.

In the 1920s, at a time when universities, corporate sponsored teams, and private clubs all competed in the same bracket, the club played in six national championship games:

- 1921 - 1st, 42-36 (defeating Southwest Kansas College)
- 1922 - 2nd, 42-28 (losing to Lowe and Campbell Athletic Goods of Kansas City)
- 1923 - 1st, 31-18 (defeating Hillyard, Inc. Shine Alls)
- 1924 - 2nd, 30-26 (losing to Butler University)
- 1926 - 2nd, 25-20 (losing to Hillyard)
- 1928 - 2nd, 25-23 (losing to Cook's Painter Boys)

== Rise and decline ==
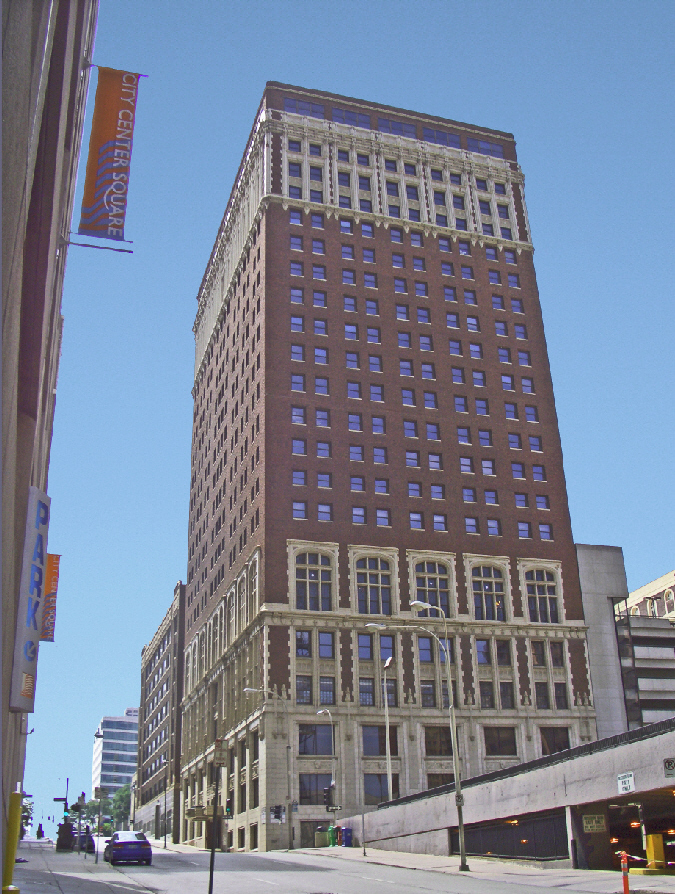
Clubhouse, 1923-1997; today the Mark Twain Tower

In February 1917, the Kansas City Athletic Club planned to construct a new clubhouse in Downtown Kansas City, but was experiencing serious difficulties in obtaining financing. In March 1917, the board proposed a merger with the Kansas City Club. But after a joint board meeting of the two clubs, the Kansas City Club's board rejected the proposal.

Instead, in 1923, the club acquired an unfinished, 22-story building at Eleventh Street and Baltimore Avenue in Downtown Kansas City. The club hired architect firm Hoit, Price & Barnes, and completed the building.

In 1932, however, during the Great Depression, the Continental Hotel Company took over the 22-story clubhouse, leaving only the six topmost floors devoted to the club itself. For a period in the 1960s, the hotel contained a branch of the Playboy Club. In 1982, the building was remodeled and renamed as the Mark Twain Tower, an office building. The club retained the rights to the top six floors.

On February 29, 2016, the Mark Twain Tower was purchased by National Historic Property Developer Hudson Holdings. Located in Delray Beach, Florida, Hudson Holdings' mission is the acquisition, development and adaptive reuse of significant and large scale retail, residential, hotel and office properties. The company’s slate of mixed-use historic restoration and historic preservation projects, most notably in central, downtown and core business districts across the country comprises nearly 5 million square feet of space valued in excess more than $1.2 billion. Major historic renovation projects include: The Huntington Building, Mark Twain Tower, Republic Building, Railway Exchange, Starks Building, Textile Building, Gulfstream Hotel, and the Sundy House.

== Notable club members ==
- Tusten Ackerman, early basketball star
- Forrest DeBernardi, early basketball star
- John Kuck, shot put olympian
- Dutch Lonborg, prolific college basketball coach
- Fay Moulton, Olympic sprinter, football player and coach, and lawyer
- Joseph Reilly, college football player and coach and athletic director of the KCAC.
- Lee Talbott, track & field athlete
- Harry S. Truman, 33rd President of the United States
- Alfred Michael "Chief" Venne, basketball coach and Indian activist
- George Williams, early basketball star

== See also ==
- List of American gentlemen's clubs
- Kansas City Club
- Kansas City Country Club
