= Merle Alexander =

American basketball player (1907–1987)

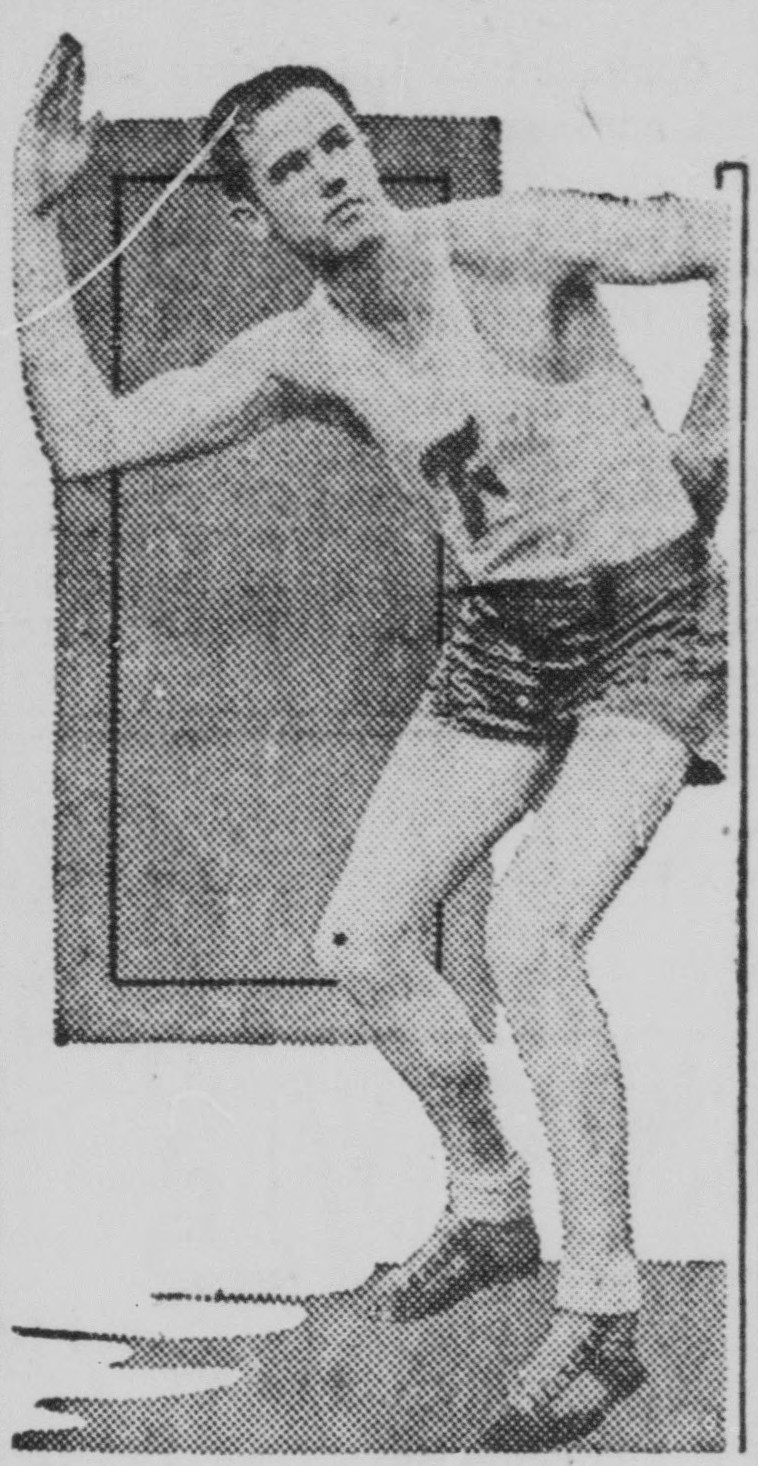
- Alexander, circa 1935

Personal information
- Born: September 2, 1907 Rushville, Indiana, U.S.
- Died: February 2, 1987 (aged 79) Leesburg, Florida, U.S.
- Listed height: 6 ft 6 in (1.98 m)
- Listed weight: 185 lb (84 kg)

Career information
- College: Franklin
- Position: Forward / center

Career history
- 1928–1929: Miami Paul's Tires
- 1929–1930: Tulsa Oilers
- 1930–1931: Wichita Henrys
- 1931–1936: Akron Firestones
- 1938–1939: Indianapolis Kautskys

Career highlights
- AAU All-American (1931)

Merle A. Alexander (September 2, 1907 – February 2, 1987) was an American professional basketball player. He played for the Indianapolis Kautskys in the National Basketball League during the 1938–39 season. Prior to that, Alexander had played on various teams in the Amateur Athletic Union (AAU), which at the time was considered the premier amateur league for basketball. He was named an AAU All-American in the 1930–31 season while playing for the Wichita Henrys.
