= Richard Rompala =

American executive (born 1947)

Richard M. Rompala
- Born: 1947 (age 77–78); Pittsburgh, Pennsylvania
- Spouse: Jean Rompala
- Children: 2

Richard M. Rompala (born 1947) is an American executive currently on the board of directors of the Olin Corporation. He was chairman of Valspar from February 1998 until his retirement in July 2005. He had previously served as both CEO and president of Valspar. Rompala's leadership is credited with significantly expanding Valspar's international business operations, where it had previously been a primarily North American business.

== Early life and education ==
Richard Rompala was born in 1947 to a working-class family on Pittsburgh's strongly Eastern European South Side. Rompala's steelworker father eventually moved the family to Ambridge, Pennsylvania.

In 1964, Rompala went to Columbia University, earning bachelor's degrees in chemistry and chemical engineering in 1969. He went on to Harvard Business School where he earned an MBA in 1975.

== Management work ==
Rompala got his first management position at the Olin Corporation, running their flexible urethanes division. He left this position in 1979 to work for Victor Posner and eventually served as a senior vice president of operations at Mueller Brass. In 1985, he went to work for PPG Industries starting as a vice president of corporate development. He was eventually promoted to group vice president of chemicals and then to group vice president of resins and coatings. In 1993, PPG's chairman and CEO, Vincent Sarni was on the verge of retirement, and outside speculation suggested that Rompala was a serious contender to take his place. This, however, did not happen, and Rompala left PPG.

In May 1994, Rompala was elected president of Valspar. On October 30, 1995, he assumed the position of CEO at Valspar, succeeding C. Angus Wurtele in that position. He went on to replace Wurtele as chairman in February 1998, with Wurtele staying on Valspar's board of directors. Rompala's contributions at Valspar enabled them to increase their overseas revenues from 3% in the mid-1990s to nearly 30% by 2004. Rompala accomplished this by opening joint ventures in China, Hong Kong, Brazil, South Africa and Mexico.

In 1998, Rompala went to work on the Olin Corporation's board of directors, where he currently serves as the lead director and chair of the compensation committee. Rompala retired from Valspar as chairman in July 2005.
