= Valspar =

American paint company

The Valspar Corporation
- Type: Subsidiary
- Industry: Coatings
- Founded: 1806; 220 years ago, in Boston, Massachusetts
- Founder: Samuel Tuck; Lawson Valentine; Henry Valentine
- Headquarters: Minneapolis, Minnesota
- Key people: Gary Hendrickson (president, CEO); James Muehlbauer (CFO, Chief administrative officer)
- Products: Paint; Varnish
- Revenue: ▼US$4.191 billion (2016)
- Operating income: ▼US$529.0 million (2016)
- Net income: ▼US$353.0 million (2016)
- Total assets: ▼US$4.315 billion (2016)
- Total equity: ▲US$1.113 billion (2016)
- Number of employees: 11,083 (2016)
- Parent: Sherwin-Williams
- Subsidiaries: House of Kolor; Huarun Paints; Plasti-kote; Cabot Stains
- Website: www.valspar.com

The Valspar Corporation is an American manufacturer of paint and coatings based in Minneapolis, Minnesota. With over 11,000 employees in 26 countries and a company history that spans two centuries, it was the sixth largest paint and coating corporation in the world. Valspar was founded in 1806 as a paint dealership in Boston, Massachusetts. The Valspar name emerged in 1903 as the name of a clear varnish and became the company name in 1932.

On March 20, 2016, Sherwin-Williams announced its intention to pay $9.3 billion to acquire Valspar. The acquisition finalized on June 1, 2017.

== History ==
=== 19th century beginnings ===
In 1806, Samuel Tuck established a paint dealership in Boston, Massachusetts called "Paint and Color". Over the next 50 years, the dealership changed owners and names several times and was eventually acquired by Augustine Stimson. In 1832, Lawson Valentine incorporated Valentine & Company as a varnish manufacturer in Boston. The two businesses eventually merged under the name Stimson & Valentine.

In 1855, Otis Merriam joined as a principal owner, and in 1860, Henry Valentine, Lawson's brother, joined the company. By 1866, both Stimson and Merriam had retired from the group and the company name was changed back to Valentine & Company. Lawson hired Charles Homer, brother of American artist Winslow Homer, as a chemist for the company. Homer was one of only a few chemists in the U.S. at that time, and was the first such specialist recruited into the American varnish industry.

In 1870, Valentine & Company relocated to New York City and acquired the Minnesota Linseed Oil Paint Company. Around this time, the company began to develop varnishes for use on vehicles that could compete with English-made varnishes. Henry Valentine succeeded his brother as president in 1882, taking over a company with operations in Boston, Chicago, New York City, and on the west coast of the U.S. Later, their operations expanded to Pennsylvania and Paris.

=== The Valspar name ===
Valspar was the first ever clear varnish; it was developed by L. Valentine Pulsifer, Lawson Valentine's grandson. Pulsifer had joined the company in 1903 after earning a degree in chemistry from Harvard University. After three years of experimentation, he created the clear varnish, which went into production by 1905. The Valspar varnish was the company's main product for more than 30 years. The advertising tagline, "The varnish that won't turn white" made Valspar a household name. Famous users of Valspar included Robert Peary in his 1909 expedition, the U.S. military during World War I, and Charles Lindbergh during his 1927 solo intercontinental flight.

In 1932, the Valspar Corporation was formed, with Valentine & Company retained as a subsidiary. In 1960, Valspar merged with Ralph Baudhuin's Rockcote, which gave the company more manufacturing in the midwestern U.S. and a new headquarters in Ardmore, Pennsylvania. Under the leadership of Ralph and F. J. Baudhuin, Valspar averaged almost two acquisitions per year through the 1960s. In June 1970, Valspar merged with Minnesota Paints and relocated to Minneapolis, Minnesota. Its former president, C. Angus Wurtele, became chairman of Valspar in 1973. The influx of cash from this latest acquisition boosted Valspar's acquisition power, and by the end of the decade, the company's annual revenue had increased by $74 million.

=== Era of acquisitions ===
Before the 1980s, Valspar's primary focus was on its consumer business.

In 1984, the company acquired Mobil's coatings division for $100 million, which was a low price because the division represented less than 0.5 percent of Mobil's total business. This acquisition effectively doubled Valspar's revenues. Valspar completed the integration of Mobil's operations by 1986.

Throughout the rest of the 1980s and during the early 1990s, Valspar continued to acquire paint and coatings companies and continued growing. It acquired the Enterprise Paint Companies in 1987, the McCloskey Corporation in 1989, and Hi-Tek Polymers and portions of Cook Paint and Varnish Company in 1991. Valspar announced in 1993 that it would acquire Cargill's resin products division, but the Federal Trade Commission tried to block it because Valspar would have had too large a share of the resin market in the midwestern U.S. Valspar went ahead with the deal anyway, but divided the business between two companies: McWhorter Technologies and Engineered Polymer Solutions.

Richard Rompala, formerly of PPG Industries, became president of Valspar in 1994, chief executive officer in 1995, and chairman in 1998. He pushed the then-primarily North American company into China, Hong Kong, Brazil, Mexico, and South Africa and acquired a number of companies. In 2000, Valspar acquired Lilly Industries for $1.04 billion, which required Valspar to divest its mirror coatings business to conform with U.S. antitrust law. Because of the cooling economy, restructuring charges from 14 plant closings in 2001, increasing raw materials prices, and higher debt servicing costs, Valspar's 26 consecutive years of earnings growth ended.

In 2005, Valspar bought Samuel Cabot Incorporated, known for its Cabot brand interior and exterior stains and finishes. Cabot had been privately owned since 1877.

In December 2006, the Valspar acquired the powder coatings business of H.B. Fuller. H.B. Fuller’s powder coatings business, which had net sales of approximately $75 million in 2005, serves customers in 26 countries from manufacturing facilities in the United States and the United Kingdom.

Sherwin-Williams acquired Valspar on June 1, 2017 in an all-cash deal valued at $9.3 billion.

=== 2017 formulation controversy ===
Valspar faced significant public scrutiny and financial liability in 2017 following a widespread product defect involving its signature paint line sold through the UK retailer B&Q. The controversy arose after Valspar modified its paint formulation by removing a specific preservative additive, a move intended to reduce chemical content but which inadvertently allowed bacteria to proliferate within the cans. Once applied to interior walls, the bacterial breakdown released volatile sulfur-based gases, resulting in a pungent odor described by consumers as "cat urine" or "rotten animals". The stench was notably exacerbated by atmospheric heat and direct sunlight, making many homes uninhabitable.

Initially, Valspar attributed the phenomenon to environmental factors such as porous wall surfaces or improper preparation; however, as the volume of complaints escalated, the manufacturer officially acknowledged the bacterial contamination. To mitigate the reputational damage, Valspar committed to a compensation scheme that covered the costs of professional redecoration and the purchase of specialized alkaline-based sealants required to neutralize the persistent ammonia-like fumes.

== Notable employees ==
- Joseph Campbell, fourth Comptroller General of the United States
