= 1940 NCAA Men's Basketball All-Americans =

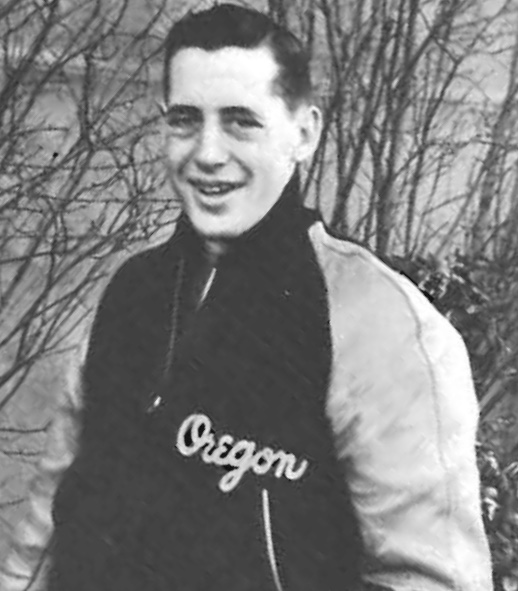
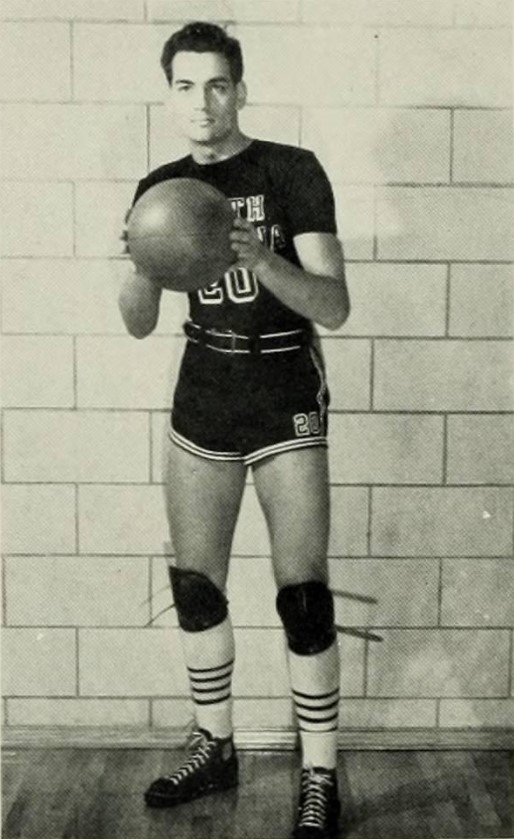
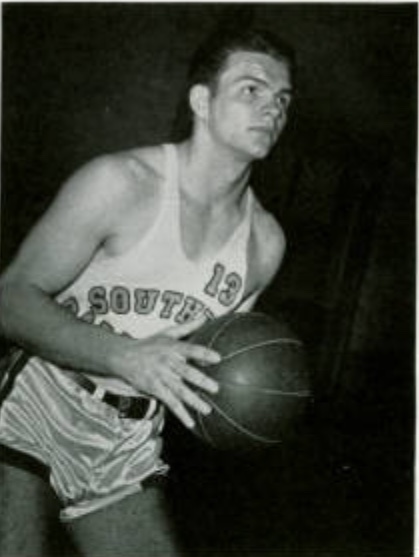
- Members of the 1940 Consensus All-America first team. Clockwise from upper left: Dick, Glamack, Vaughn (not pictured: Broberg, Hapac).
- Awarded for: 1939–40 NCAA men's basketball season

The consensus 1940 College Basketball All-American team, as determined by aggregating the results of four major All-American teams. To earn "consensus" status, a player must win honors from a majority of the following teams: the Helms Athletic Foundation, Converse, and Madison Square Garden.

== 1940 Consensus All-America team ==
Consensus First Team
Player	Class	Team
Gus Broberg	Junior	Dartmouth
John Dick	Senior	Oregon
George Glamack	Junior	North Carolina
Bill Hapac	Senior	Illinois
Ralph Vaughn	Senior	Southern California

Consensus Second Team
Player	Class	Team
Jack Harvey	Senior	Colorado
Marv Huffman	Senior	Indiana
Jimmy McNatt	Senior	Oklahoma
Jesse Renick	Senior	Oklahoma A&M

== Individual All-America teams ==
All-America Team
All-America Team	First team		Second team		Third team	
All-America Team	Player	School	Player	School	Player	School
Helms	Fred Beretta	Purdue	No second or third teams			
Helms	Gus Broberg	Dartmouth	No second or third teams			
Helms	John Dick	Oregon	No second or third teams			
Helms	George Glamack	North Carolina	No second or third teams			
Helms	Bill Hapac	Illinois	No second or third teams			
Helms	John Lobsiger	Missouri	No second or third teams			
Helms	Stan Modzelewski	Rhode Island State	No second or third teams			
Helms	Bobby Moers	Texas	No second or third teams			
Helms	Jesse Renick	Oklahoma A&M	No second or third teams			
Helms	Ralph Vaughn	Southern California	No second or third teams			
Converse	Bill Hapac	Illinois	Gus Broberg	Dartmouth	Chet Aubuchon	Michigan State
Converse	Jack Harvey	Colorado	John Dick	Oregon	Ralph Giannini	Santa Clara
Converse	Marv Huffman	Indiana	George Glamack	North Carolina	Bill Menke	Indiana
Converse	Jimmy McNatt	Oklahoma	Jesse Renick	Oklahoma A&M	Milton Phelps	San Diego State
Converse	Ralph Vaughn	Southern California	Melford Waits	Tarkio	Carlisle Towery	Western Kentucky
Madison Square Garden	John Dick	Oregon	Ralph Giannini	Santa Clara	No third team	
Madison Square Garden	Ed Milkovich	Duquesne	Larry Kenney	Saint Joseph's	No third team	
Madison Square Garden	Eddie Riska	Notre Dame	Lou Possner	DePaul	No third team	
Madison Square Garden	Jerry Steiner	Butler	Stan Szukala	DePaul	No third team	
Madison Square Garden	Ralph Vaughn	Southern California	Paul Widowitz	Duquesne	No third team	

== See also ==
- 1939–40 NCAA men's basketball season
