= Fred Beretta =

American basketball player

Personal information
- Born: January 24, 1917 Proctor, Vermont, U.S.
- Died: November 17, 1962 (aged 45) Indianapolis, Indiana, U.S.

Career information
- High school: Bedford (Bedford, Indiana)
- College: Purdue (1937–1940)
- Position: Guard

Career history
- 1940–1941: Akron Firestone Non-Skids

Career highlights
- First-team All-American – Helms (1940); First-team All-Big Ten (1940)

Fernando Frederick Beretta (January 24, 1917 – November 17, 1962) was an American basketball player. He is best known for his All-American college career with Purdue University.

Beretta played at Bedford High School in Bedford, Indiana, then went to Purdue to play college basketball. At Purdue Beretta was a three-year letterman, a member of Pi Kappa Phi fraternity, and earned first-team All-Big Ten Conference and first-team All-American honors from the Helms Athletic Foundation as a senior in 1940. A guard, Beretta was known as a strong defender and ballhandler.

Beretta played for the Akron Firestone Non-Skids in the 1940–41 National Basketball League season, prior to joining the U.S. Army for World War II. Beretta would later be inducted into the Purdue athletic hall of fame and the Indiana Basketball Hall of Fame.
