= Jack Harvey (basketball) =

American basketball player (1918–1981)

Personal information
- Born: August 6, 1918 Marysville, Kansas, U.S.
- Died: November 21, 1981 (aged 63) Fort Collins, Colorado, U.S.
- Listed height: 6 ft 3 in (1.91 m)
- Listed weight: 170 lb (77 kg)

Career information
- High school: Frankfort (Frankfort, Kansas)
- College: Colorado (1937–1940)
- Position: Forward / center
- Number: 3

Career highlights
- Consensus second-team All-American (1940)

Jack Arthur Harvey (August 6, 1918 – November 21, 1981) was an All-American basketball forward/center at the University of Colorado from 1937 to 1940. As a senior in 1939–40, Harvey became the first Buffaloes basketball player to earn a Consensus All-American distinction when he garnered a Second Team accolade. He had also been recognized as a First Team All-American in 1939, although he was not a consensus selection. Harvey led the Buffaloes to two conference championships and a trip to the NCAA tournament his senior season. During his junior and senior years, Colorado posted a 31–8 record and spent some time as the #1 team in the country.

No records of Harvey's scoring and rebounding statistics have ever been found. He was known as a tenacious defender, however, which is probably a leading cause for his All-American distinction in 1939 and 1940.

In 1942, Harvey helped lead the Denver American Legion of the AAU to a national championship by defeating the Phillips 66ers 45–32.

Harvey died on November 21, 1981, at age 63.
