= Pete McCaffrey =

American basketball player (1938–2012)

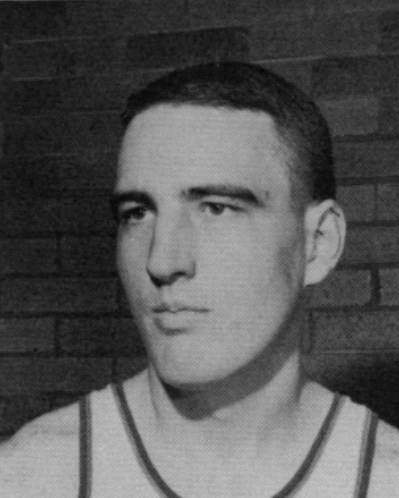
- McCaffrey from the 1960 Archive

Personal information
- Born: December 24, 1938 Tucson, Arizona, U.S.
- Died: March 4, 2012 (aged 73) Bellaire, Florida, U.S.
- Listed height: 6 ft 6 in (1.98 m)
- Listed weight: 216 lb (98 kg)

Career information
- High school: Cascia Hall (Tulsa, Oklahoma)
- College: Saint Louis (1957–1960)
- NBA draft: 1960: undrafted
- Position: Forward

Career history
- 1960–1961: Buchan Bakers
- 1961–1964: Akron Wingfoots

Career highlights
- First-team All-MVC (1960)
Medals
Men's basketball
Representing the United States
Olympic Games
Gold medal – first place	1964 Tokyo	Team competition

John Paul "Pete" McCaffrey (December 24, 1938 – March 4, 2012) was an American basketball player. He played for the gold medal-winning United States men's national basketball team at the 1964 Summer Olympics. He also played for the fourth place squad at the 1963 FIBA World Championship.

McCaffrey was born in Tucson, Arizona and played collegiately at Saint Louis. Later, in 1994, he was inducted into the school's hall of fame.

Aside from playing for the national team, McCaffrey played in the Amateur Athletic Union, first for the Buchan Bakers and then for the Akron Goodyear Wingfoots. He was named an AAU All-American three times (1962–1964) while playing for the Wingfoots. He also played 16 times for the United States.
