= Ken Pryor =

American basketball player

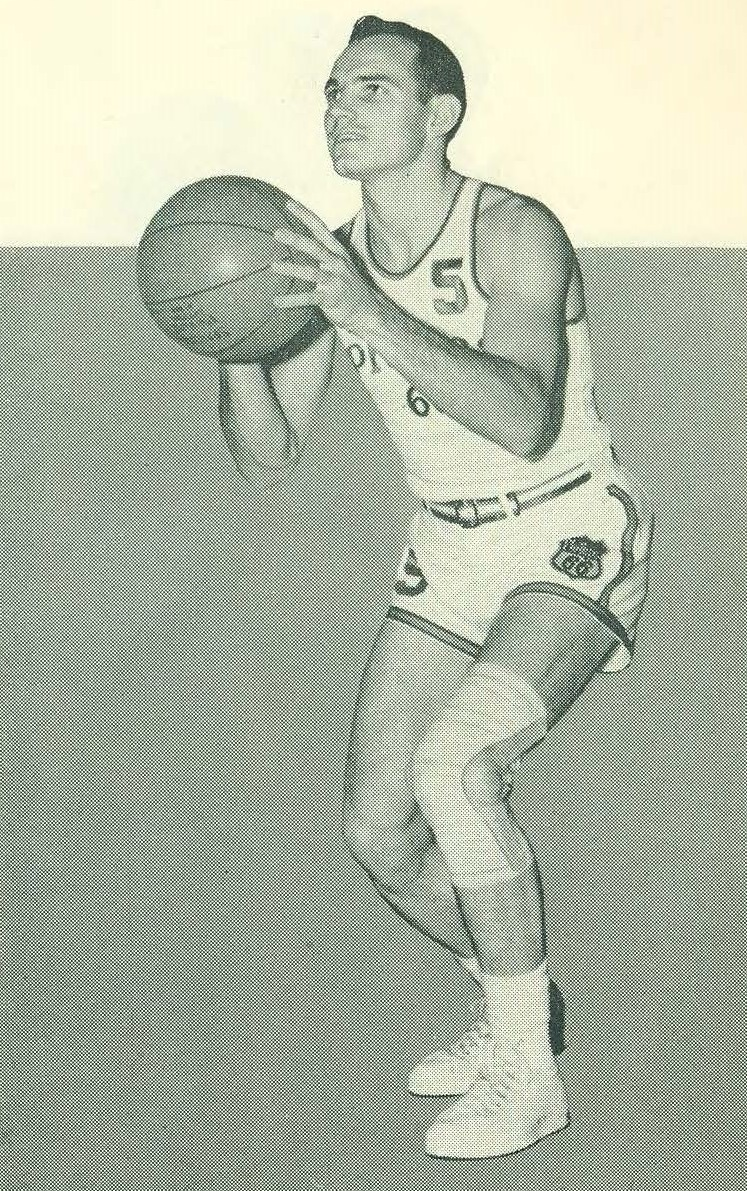
- Pryor with the Phillips 66ers.

Personal information
- Born: December 12, 1924 Wirt, Oklahoma
- Died: August 31, 2010 (aged 85)

Career information
- High school: Capitol Hill (Oklahoma City, Oklahoma)
- College: Oklahoma (1943–1947)
- Position: Guard
- Number: 29, 25

Career history
- 1949–1952: Phillips 66ers

Career highlights
- First-team All-Big Six (1944); 2× AAU All-American (1951–1952)

Ken Pryor (December 12, 1924 – August 31, 2010) was an American basketball player. He is known both for his college career at the University of Oklahoma and his play in the Amateur Athletic Union during an era when it was seen as a viable alternative to professional basketball.

Pryor was a three-sport star at Capitol Hill High School in Oklahoma City, Oklahoma. He went to the University of Oklahoma to play for future Hall of Fame coach Bruce Drake. While there, he was a first team All-Big Six Conference pick in the 1943–44 season. Pryor also played on the baseball team.

After taking time off to serve in the United States Navy during World War II, Pryor returned to the Sooners. In his final season of 1946–47, Pryor was a member of the Oklahoma's 1947 Final Four team. Pryor hit one of the biggest shots in Sooner basketball history as his jump shot with ten seconds remaining lifted the team over Texas and into the national championship game. Oklahoma lost to Holy Cross in the contest.

Following his college career, Pryor went to play for the AAU power Phillips 66ers. He earned AAU All-American honors in 1951 and 1952. He later worked for the oil company and ran his own insurance agency.
