= Jerry Shipp =

American basketball player (1935–2021)

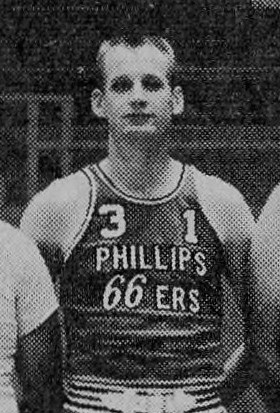
- Shipp during the 1963–64 season

Personal information
- Born: September 27, 1935 Shreveport, Louisiana, U.S.
- Died: October 5, 2021 (aged 86) Denison, Texas, U.S.
- Listed height: 6 ft 6 in (1.98 m)
- Listed weight: 196 lb (89 kg)

Career information
- High school: Blue (Blue, Oklahoma)
- College: SE Oklahoma State (1955–1959)
- NBA draft: 1959: 9th round, 64th overall pick
- Drafted by: New York Knicks
- Position: Small forward
- Number: 31

Career highlights
- 3× AAU All-American (1962–1964)
- Stats at Basketball Reference
Medals
Men's basketball
Representing United States
Olympic Games
| Gold medal – first place | 1964 Tokyo | Team |
Pan American Games
| Gold medal – first place | 1963 São Paulo |

Jerome Franklin Shipp (September 27, 1935 – October 5, 2021) was an American basketball player. He played for the U.S. national team at the 1963 FIBA World Championship, 1963 Pan American Games and 1964 Summer Olympics, winning a gold medal at the latter two competitions. Shipp was also a three-time Amateur Athletic Union All-American for the Phillips 66ers in Bartlesville, Oklahoma during the 1960s.

== Early life ==
Shipp was born in Shreveport, Louisiana on September 27, 1935. However, he was raised in Blue, Oklahoma, and attended Blue High School.

== Basketball career ==
=== College ===
Shipp enrolled at Southeastern State College (now called Southeastern Oklahoma State University) in the fall of 1955. He played for the Savage Storm for four years, from 1955–56 through 1958–59, and he is recognized as "one of the greatest basketball players in the history of [Southeastern Oklahoma State University]". Shipp led the conference in scoring twice, was a three-time all-conference performer, and set two different conference records: points in a game (54) and most free throws made without a miss (19). In 1978 he was inducted into the school's hall of fame, and in 2007, Shipp was inducted into the Oklahoma Sports Hall of Fame.

=== Amateur Athletic Union ===
After graduation, Shipp was selected in the 1959 NBA draft by the New York Knicks. He was taken in the 9th round as the 64th overall pick. Shipp, however, opted to play in the Amateur Athletic Union (AAU) instead in order to retain his "amateur" status. Back then, only amateurs were allowed to compete in international competition while representing their country, such as the Pan American, FIBA World Championship and Summer Olympic Games.

During the next five years, Shipp played for the AAU powerhouse Phillips 66ers. He played in three consecutive national championships with them between 1962 and 1964, winning the title the first two times. During these three seasons he was also named an AAU All-American. Shipp finished his career as the highest scoring non-center in Phillips 66ers history (Bob Kurland, a center, was the team's all-time leading scorer).

=== Team USA ===
Representing the United States, Shipp won two gold medals in less than two years while playing for the basketball team. At the 1963 Pan American Games in São Paulo, Brazil, the U.S. swept the competition en route to a perfect 6–0 record. He averaged 15.0 points per game, the highest on the team, while making 42 field goals and six free throws.

On the 1963 FIBA World Championship team, the U.S. cruised out of the preliminary round with a 3–0 record. They stumbled in the final round, however, going 3–3 (6–3 overall) and did not win a medal, finishing in fourth place. Shipp led the team in scoring at 15.7 points per game in nine games played.

At the 1964 Summer Olympics held in Tokyo, Japan, Shipp played alongside future Hall of Famers Bill Bradley and Larry Brown, as well as veritable basketball stars Walt Hazzard, Jeff Mullins and Joe Caldwell. It was Shipp, however, that led the team in scoring. He guided Team USA to an unblemished 9–0 record while averaging 12.4 points per game—2.3 more per game than Bradley, who was second on the team in scoring. In a 69–61 win over Yugoslavia during the Group Stage, Shipp scored a personal tournament-high 22 points and accounted for nearly one-third of the team's total offense. In the championship game against the Soviet Union, who also entered the contest with an 8–0 record like the United States, he scored 10 points in the 73–59 win to earn the gold medal.

== Later life ==
Toward the end of 1964, fresh off two AAU national championships, three AAU All-American honors, and two gold medals with Team USA, Shipp was nominated as a finalist for the James E. Sullivan Award. It is an award given annually by the AAU to "the outstanding amateur athlete in the United States". He spent the rest of his life in business, much of it with ConocoPhillips. Shipp was inducted into the Helms Athletic Foundation and National Association of Intercollegiate Athletics (NAIA) Halls of Fame. Shipp died on October 5, 2021, at the age of 86.
