= Lester Lane =

American basketball player (1932–1973)

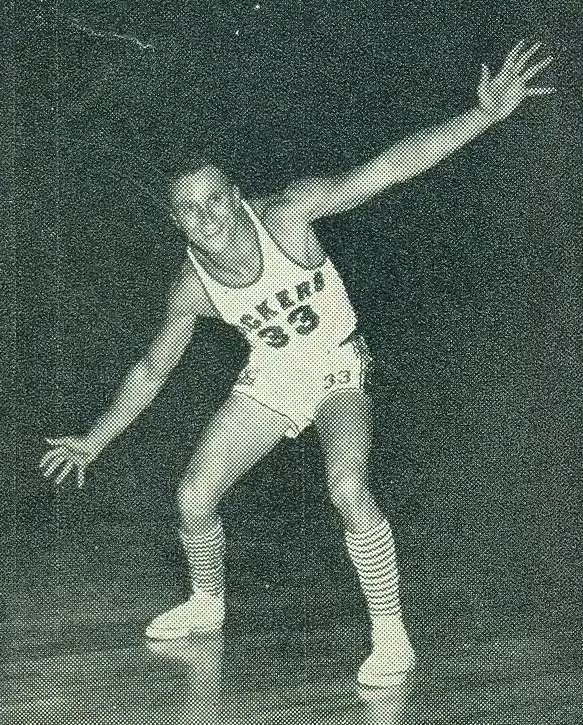
- Lane with the Wichita Vickers

Personal information
- Born: March 6, 1932 Purcell, Oklahoma, U.S.
- Died: September 5, 1973 (aged 41) Norman, Oklahoma, U.S.
- Listed height: 5 ft 10 in (1.78 m)
- Listed weight: 170 lb (77 kg)

Career information
- High school: Purcell (Purcell, Oklahoma)
- College: Oklahoma (1951–1955)
- NBA draft: 1955: 9th round, 52nd overall pick
- Drafted by: Philadelphia Warriors
- Position: Guard

Career highlights
- 2x AAU All-American (1959, 1961)
- Stats at Basketball Reference
Medals
Men's basketball
Representing United States
Olympic Games
Gold medal – first place	1960 Rome	Team competition

Lester E. Lane (March 6, 1932 – September 5, 1973) was an American basketball player who competed in the 1960 Summer Olympics.

Lane was born in Purcell, Oklahoma. He was drafted by the Philadelphia Warriors in the 9th round of the 1955 NBA draft, but never played for them, instead playing for several AAU clubs, including the Wichita Vickers and Denver-Chicago Truckers." He was part of the American basketball team, which won the gold medal in 1960. In the spring of 1973 he was named head basketball coach at the University of Oklahoma, but never held a practice as he died of a heart attack during a pick-up game later that year.

Lane was the head coach for the Mexico men's national basketball team led by Carlos Quintanar in the 1968 Summer Olympics
