= R. C. Pitts =

American basketball player (1919–2011)

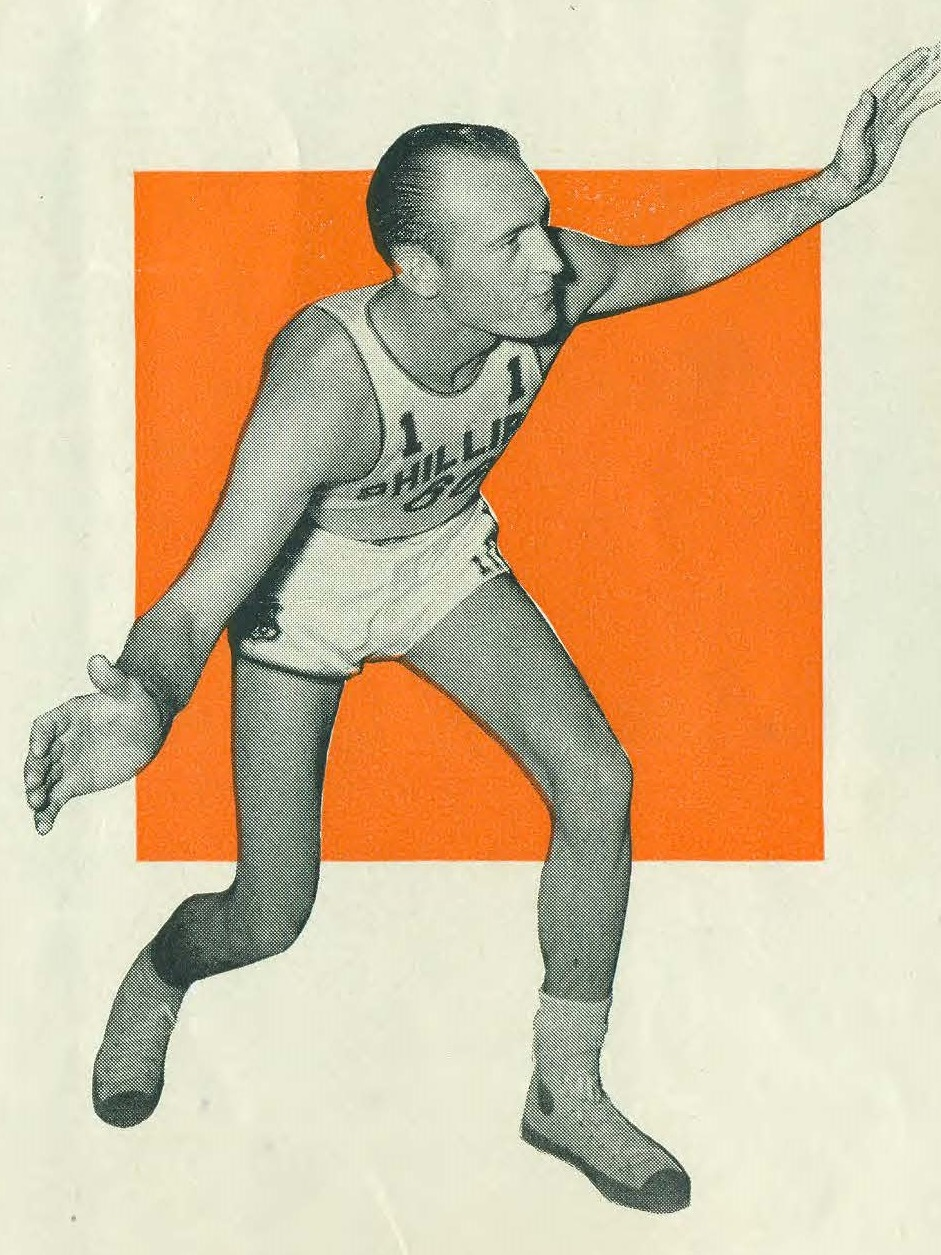
- Pitts with the Phillips 66ers

Personal information
- Born: June 23, 1919 Pontotoc, Mississippi, U.S.
- Died: October 29, 2011 (aged 92) Baton Rouge, Louisiana, U.S.
- Listed height: 6 ft 4.5 in (1.94 m)
- Listed weight: 201 lb (91 kg)

Career information
- High school: University (Oxford, Mississippi)
- College: Arkansas (1939–1942)
- Position: Guard

Career highlights
- AAU All-American (1948); First-team All-SWC (1942)
Medals
Men's basketball
Representing the United States
Olympic Games
Gold medal – first place	1948 London	Team competition

Robert C. Pitts (June 23, 1919 – October 29, 2011) was an American basketball player who competed in the 1948 Summer Olympics.

Pitts played collegiately for the University of Arkansas, making All-Southwest Conference in 1942. He later played for the Amateur Athletic Union juggernaut Phillips Petroleum Phillips 66ers, where he made AAU All-America in 1948.

Pitts was part of the American men's basketball team in the 1948 Summer Olympics, which won the gold medal.

== Personal life ==
Pitts served as a first lieutenant in the 68th Bombardment Squadron of the United States Army Air Forces during World War II. Flying 22 missions with his crew, he was awarded the Air Medal.
