= George Williams (basketball, born 1899) =

American basketball player

Personal information
- Born: 1899; Kansas City, Missouri, U.S.
- Died: February 4, 1961 (aged 62); Kansas City, Missouri, U.S.

Career information
- High school: Central (Kansas City, Missouri)
- College: Missouri (1918–1921)
- Position: Center

Career highlights and awards
- 3× AAU All-American (1922–1924); Helms National Player of the Year (1921); 2× Helms Foundation All-American (1920, 1921); 2× First-team All-MVC (1920, 1921)

George L. "Shorty" Williams (1899 – February 4, 1961) was an American basketball center who played for the Missouri Tigers. He was a two-time All-American and was named the Helms National Player of the Year as a senior in 1920–21. That season, Williams scored 17.2 points per game en route to a 17–1 record and the Missouri Valley Conference championship. It was the second consecutive conference championship for the Tigers. George was the younger brother of Fred Williams, who was also an All-American at Missouri.

Williams scored 311 points in 1920–21, which was a school record that stood for over 30 years. Regarded by Missouri basketball supporters as one of the greatest centers in program history, he led the Tigers to a two-year cumulative record of 34–2. He is still the only University of Missouri player to be named the national player of the year in men's basketball.

After college, Williams played AAU basketball and won two national championships, first with Lowe & Campbell's in 1922 and then with Kansas City AC Diamonds in 1923.

On February 4, 1961, Williams suffered a heart attack while putting luggage into his car and died later that day.
