= Bus Whitehead =

American basketball player

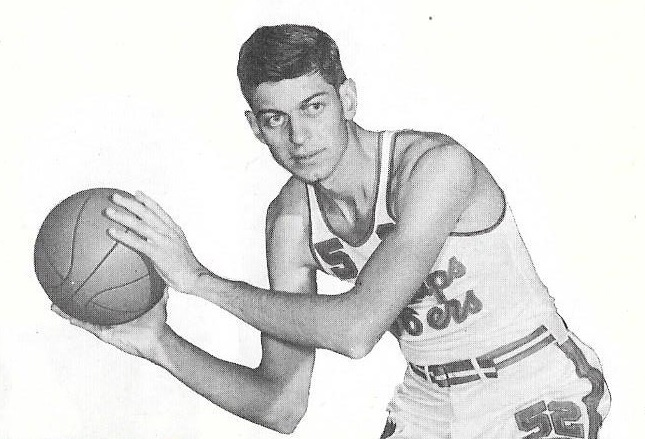
- Whitehead with the Phillips 66ers

Personal information
- Born: January 13, 1928 Kansas City, Kansas
- Died: June 11, 2010 (aged 82) Lincoln, Nebraska
- Listed height: 6 ft 9 in (2.06 m)
- Listed weight: 210 lb (95 kg)

Career information
- High school: Scottsbluff (Scottsbluff, Nebraska)
- College: Nebraska (1947–1950)
- NBA draft: 1950: 7th round, 75th overall pick
- Drafted by: Chicago Stags
- Position: Center / power forward
- Number: 14, 52

Career history
- 1950–1953: Phillips 66ers

Career highlights
- AAU All-American (1952); AP Honorable Mention All-American (1950); First-team All-Big Seven (1950)
- Stats at Basketball Reference

Milton Edgar "Bus" Whitehead (January 13, 1928 – June 11, 2010). was an American basketball player. He was an All-conference college player for the University of Nebraska and was an AAU All-American for league power Phillips 66.

Whitehead came to the Cornhuskers from Scottsbluff, Nebraska and led the Huskers to back to back Big Seven Conference titles in 1949 and 1950. In the 1948–49 season, Whitehead teamed with guard Claude Retherford as the Huskers tied Oklahoma for the Big Seven title. After Retherford's graduation, Whitehead became the focal point of the Nebraska offense for 1949–50. Averaging 15.7 points per game (then a school single-season record), Whitehead was the only unanimous member of the Big Seven all-conference first team. He was also named an honorable mention All-American by the Associated Press. Following the season, Whitehead became the first Nebraska player selected to play in the East-West college All-Star game.

After graduation, Whitehead was drafted by the Chicago Stags in the seventh round of the 1950 NBA draft. Instead, Whitehead chose to play for the Phillips 66ers of the Amateur Athletic Union and in 1952 was named an AAU All-American. After his time with the 66ers, Whitehead entered private business. He also spent a season as an assistant coach at his alma mater.

Whitehead was named to the University of Nebraska Athletic Hall of Fame and the Nebraska High School Sports Hall of Fame. In 2011, the University of Nebraska named the court of their new practice facility the "Bus Whitehead Court," in honor of their All-American center.

Bus Whitehead died on June 11, 2010, at his home in Lincoln, Nebraska.
