= George Paul Hess =

George Paul Hess (November 18, 1922 – September 15, 2015) was a research biochemist who specialized in studying acetylcholine receptors. Hess developed laser pulse photolysis and a quench flow technique.

== Personal life ==
George Hess was born on November 18, 1922, in Vienna, Austria. He lived with his parents and grandparents, near much of his extended family. He spent his summers in the lake region of Salzkammergut, After Germany annexed Austria 1938 Hess and his father had to flee because they were Jewish. They escaped to Turin, Italy and stayed with distant family members for 9 months until they were able to obtain US visas. His mother and her parents later joined Hess and his father in the US, where they settled in California.

In 1946, he joined the US Army, where he worked in a pathology lab studying infectious diseases. In 1945, he was granted US citizenship as a result of his Army service.

George Hess married three times. His first wife was Jean Ray, with whom he had one daughter his second Betsey Williams, with whom he had four sons, and his third Susan Coombs, with whom he remained for the last 35 years of his life.

Hess died on September 15, 2015, at the age of 92.

== Education ==
Hess attended the University of California at Berkeley, where he earned his bachelor's degree in biochemistry in 1948 and his doctoral degree in biochemistry in 1952. He received postdoctoral organic chemistry training as a fellow for the National Foundation of Infantile Paralysis at MIT. He then spent 60 years working at Cornell until his retirement in 2005.

== Research ==
While working at Cornell, Hess conducted research on a variety of subjects and is named as an author on hundreds of articles. He developed laser pulse photolysis and a quench flow technique, both used to visualize results at milli- and microsecond time intervals, much smaller time increments than had been available before. Most of his research focused on the acetylcholine receptor. He often used cells from the electric organs of Electrophorus electricus (commonly known as the electric eel) and the Torpedo californica (commonly known as the Pacific electric ray) in his studies as these cells have a high density of acetylcholine receptors and imitate mammalian cells.

== Research on acetylcholine receptors ==
His research on acetylcholine receptors spanned the length of his whole career. He studied the mechanisms of these receptors, their response to flux, cocaine, phencyclidine, other inhibitors, and their changes in rate and equilibrium.

In his 1976 publication “Functional Acetylcholine Receptor-Electroplax Membrane Microsacs (Vesicles): Purification and Characterization,” Hess determines the utilization of functional versus nonfunctional microsacs and how they account for the efficiency differences in muscle and nerve cells. In his paper “Acetylcholine-Receptor-Mediated Ion Flux in Electroplax Membrane Microsacs (Vesicles): Change in Mechanism Produced by Asymmetrical Distribution of Sodium and Potassium Ions,” published two years later, Hess explored the biphasic flux and desensitization of the acetylcholine receptor in connection with microsac function.

He continued studying the relationship between the acetylcholine receptor and flux in his article published in 1980: “Molecular Mechanism of Acetylcholine Receptor-Controlled Ion Translocation Across Cell Membranes.” He studied these channels in the cells of the electric organs of the Electrophorus electricus and the Torpedo californica. Hess used carbamylcholine, a chemical analog of acetylcholine, to conduct these studies. This study mapped how these receptors worked, their ligand binding sites, and how they responded to variation in acetylcholine/carbamylcholine concentrations by conducting studies into the channel kinetics. He looked at the way that these concentrations affected the active and inactive states of the channel, and determined that the equilibrium position of this channel was one-fourth of the way open.

In his 1981 articles “Acetylcholine-Induced Cation Translocation Across Cell Membranes and Inactivation of the Acetylcholine Receptor: Chemical Kinetic Measurements in the Millisecond Time Region” and “Comparison of Acetylcholine Receptor-Controlled Cation Flux in Membrane Vesicles from Torpedo californica and Electrophorus electricus: Chemical Kinetic Measurements in the Millisecond Region,” Hess discussed his findings on the rate and equilibrium changes of the acetylcholine receptor in the active versus inactive states. He conducted this study using the novel quench flow technique which allowed measurements down to the 2-millisecond interval.

Using this quench flow technique, Hess then investigated the effects of cocaine and phencyclidine (commonly known as PCP) on the flux of the acetylcholine receptor. Both are addictive drugs, cocaine being a stimulant and phencyclidine a hallucinogen. In studying their effects on acetylcholine receptors, Hess found that both drugs inhibited the receptor and affected its equilibrium, though via different mechanisms. His findings were published in his 1982 paper “Cocaine and Phencyclidine Inhibition of the Acetylcholine Receptor: Analysis of the Mechanisms of Action Based on Measurements of Ion Flux in the Millisecond-to-Minutes Time Region.”

He continued to explore different techniques for studying the acetylcholine receptor such as the one described in his paper “Acetylcholine Receptor (from Electrophorus electricus): A Comparison of Single-Channel Current Recordings and Chemical Kinetic Measurements.” He used a single-channel measurement technique to determine the currents through the channels of the acetylcholine receptor and the lifetimes of the receptor states. He compared the results collected using this technique to results collected using an established technique involving chemical kinetic recordings. He also explored the use of an innovative fast reaction technique in his 1987 paper: “Chemical Kinetic Measurements of a Mammalian Acetylcholine Receptor by a Fast-Reaction Technique.”

In 1995 he pioneered the use of yet another revolutionary technique, laser-pulse photolysis, that allowed the visualization of results down to the microsecond. He used this technique for further studies on the effects of cocaine on the acetylcholine receptor, focusing on the muscular effects of acetylcholine receptor inhibition, rather than the neurological effects. His results were published in his 1995 paper: “Cocaine: Mechanism of Inhibition of a Muscle Acetylcholine Receptor Studied by a Laser-Pulse Photolysis Technique.”

== Other research ==
Though most of his research focused on acetylcholine receptors, Hess worked on a wide variety of subjects during his time at Cornell. His 1962 paper “Conformational Changes in Enzyme Catalysts” provided some of the first evidence that enzyme catalysts undergo conformational changes in their active site.

In 1968 he published a paper on the proteasomic digestive enzyme chymotrypsin: “Conformation and Activity of Chymotrypsin: the pH-Dependant, Substrate-Induced Proton Uptake.” His findings summarized the conformational change that chymotrypsin undergoes in reaction to a change in pH and how it leads to a proton uptake. He detailed the kinetics and determined the pK of the enzyme.

Hess used his photolysis technique to continue to study neurotransmitters. It allowed for the visualization of the glycine receptor channels and the blocking of the use of the carboxyl group in neurotransmitters. He published his results in 1993 in the article: “Photolysis of a Protecting Group for the Carboxyl Function of Neurotransmitters within 3μs and with Product Quantum Yield of 0.2,” where he also discussed the effects and uses of the photolysis technique.

He used the rapid chemical kinetics technique mentioned earlier in connection with the acetylcholine receptor to study other neurotransmitter receptors as well. This technique allows for the visualization of results from the 2 ms to 100 μs time intervals. He published his findings in 1992: “Rapid Chemical Kinetic Techniques for Investigations of Neurotransmitter Receptors Expressed in Xenopus Oocytes.” His results contrasted many previous studies done, as he was able to view results at a much smaller time increment yielding more accurate results.

In 1997 he used the photolysis technique to study Caenorhabditis elegans. (commonly known as the roundworm). He used the technique to determine which neurotransmitters were being secreted by the intricate network of neurons in the worms’ pharynges and determine the neurotransmitters’ target cells. Hess summarized his methods and findings in the publication: “Identification of Chemical Synapses in the Pharynx: Caenorhabditis elegans.”

In his article “How Fast Does the γ-Aminobutyric Acid Receptor Channel Open? Kinetic Investigations in the Microsecond Time Region Using a Laser-Pulse Photolysis Technique” published in 1999, Hess explores the GABA_{A} receptor and its kinetics. He and his colleagues used cell flow and laser-pulse photolysis to determine the rate of ligand binding to the GABA_{A} receptor, the effects that different dysfunction in this receptor would have on the body.

He also researched hepatitis, studying the different strains, their mode of transmission, and treatment options, specifically the response to treatment of interferon addition. He used laser-pulse photolysis to find precise data for the binding of ligands to their receptors. He conducted research into hepatitis G, previously known as Hepatitis G virus (HGV), but later renamed GB virus C (GBC). His article published in the Journal of Infectious Diseases in 1999: “Analysis of Hepatitis G Virus (HGV) RNA, Antibody to HGV Envelope Protein, and Risk Factors for Blood Donors Coinfected with HGV and Hepatitis C Virus” details how he and his colleagues studied coinfections of GBC with HIV/AIDS and hepatitis C virus (HCV), ultimately concluding that coinfection of GBC with HCV did not worsen the symptoms of HCV infection.
