= Frank McCabe (basketball) =

American basketball player (1927–2021)

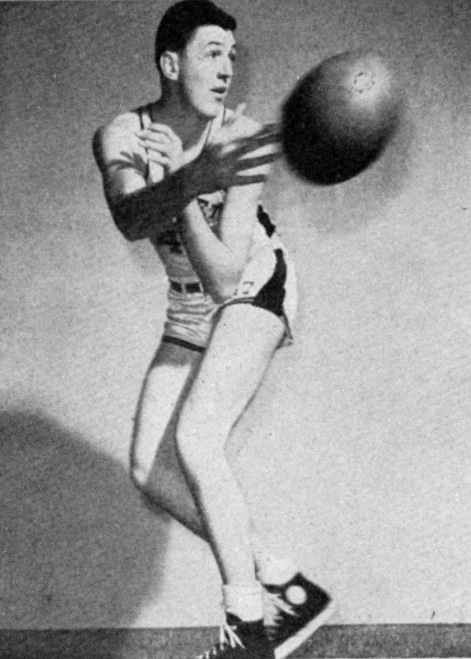
- McCabe from the 1949 Hilltop

Personal information
- Born: June 30, 1927 Grand Rapids, Michigan, U.S.
- Died: April 18, 2021 (aged 93) Peoria, Illinois, U.S.
- Listed height: 6 ft 8 in (2.03 m)
- Listed weight: 225 lb (102 kg)

Career information
- College: Marquette (1945–1949)
- BAA draft: 1949: undrafted
- Position: Forward

Career history
- 1950–1954: Peoria Caterpillars

Career highlights
- 3× AAU champion (1952–1954); 4× AAU All-American (1951–1954)
Medals
Men's basketball
Representing the United States
Olympic Games
Gold medal – first place	1952 Helsinki	Team competition

Frank Reilly McCabe (June 30, 1927 – April 18, 2021) was an American basketball player who competed in the 1952 Summer Olympics. Born in Grand Rapids, Michigan, McCabe played collegiately at Marquette University. He was part of the American basketball team, which won the gold medal. He played six matches.
