= Jesse Renick =

American basketball player

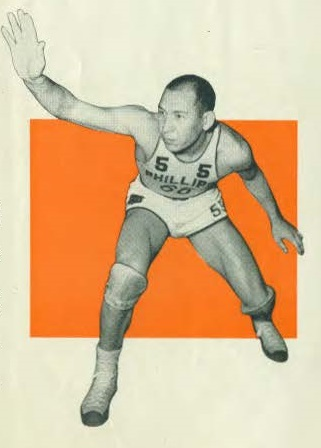
- Renick with the Phillips 66ers

Personal information
- Born: September 29, 1917 Hickory, Oklahoma, U.S.
- Died: November 25, 1999 (aged 82) Ada, Oklahoma, U.S.
- Listed height: 6 ft 2 in (1.88 m)
- Listed weight: 185 lb (84 kg)

Career information
- High school: Marietta (Marietta, Oklahoma)
- College: Murray State College (1936–1938); Oklahoma State (1938–1940)
- Position: Guard
- Number: 20

Career highlights
- 2× AAU All-American (1947, 1948); Consensus second-team All-American (1940); First-team All-American – Helms (1939)
Medals
Men's basketball
Representing the United States
Olympic Games
Gold medal – first place	1948 London	Team competition

Jesse Bernard "Cab" Renick (September 29, 1917 – November 25, 1999) was an American basketball player who competed in the 1948 Summer Olympics. Renick was A 6'2" Guard for Marietta High School in Marietta, Oklahoma. He went on to star at Oklahoma A&M University (now Oklahoma State). He was All-Missouri Valley Conference in 1939 and 1940 as well as an All-American in 1939 and 1940.

OSU's first two-time All-American selection, he played on the United States gold medal Olympic team alongside fellow Oklahoma A&M great Bob Kurland. He led the Cowboys to 45–11 record in his two seasons.

Renick, a citizen of the Chickasaw Nation, was also the second Native American, after Jim Thorpe, to win an Olympic gold medal.
