= Carl Knowles =

American basketball player (1910–1981)

Medal record

Men's basketball

Representing the United States

Olympic Games
Gold medal – first place	1936 Berlin	Team competition

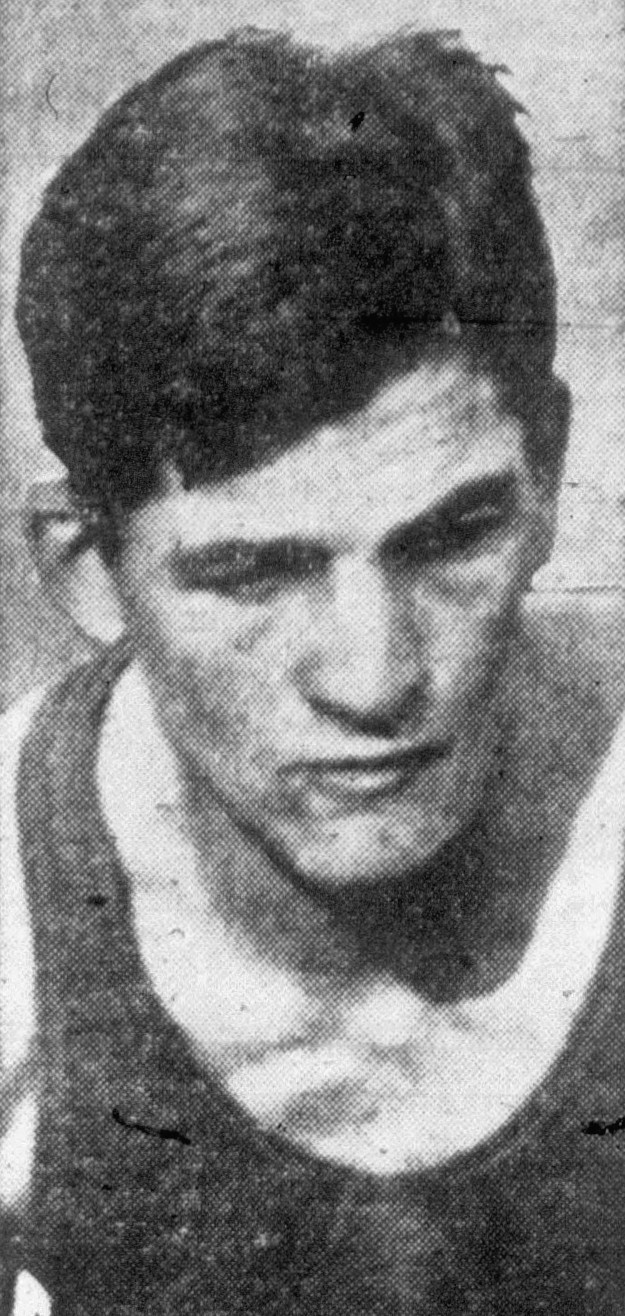
Knowles, circa 1945

Carl Stanley Knowles (February 24, 1910 – September 4, 1981) was an American basketball player who competed in the 1936 Summer Olympics.

He was part of the American basketball team, which won the gold medal. He played two matches including the final.

He played college basketball at UCLA.
