= Gerald Tucker =

American basketball player and coach

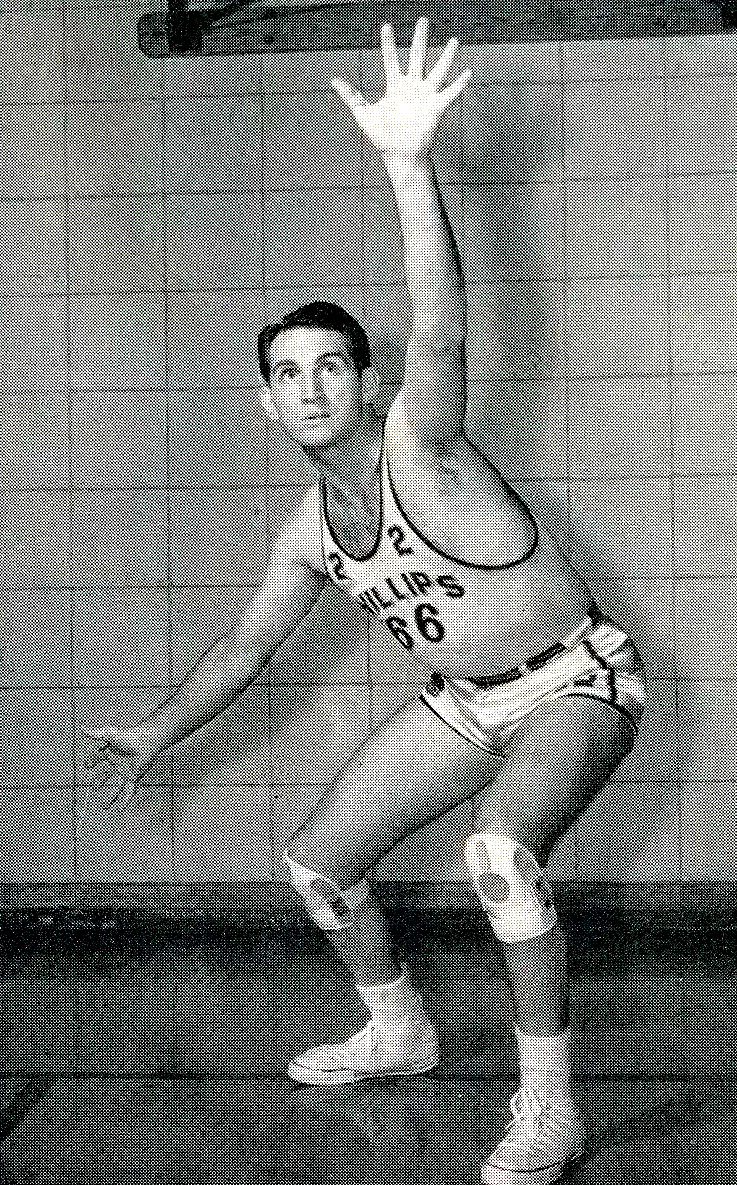
- Tucker with the Phillips 66ers

Personal information
- Born: March 14, 1922
- Died: May 21, 1979 (aged 57)
- Listed height: 6 ft 6 in (1.98 m)

Career information
- High school: Winfield (Winfield, Kansas)
- College: Oklahoma (1941–1943, 1946–1947)
- Position: Center

Career highlights
- 2x AAU All-American (1949, 1950); Helms College Player of the Year (1947); Consensus first-team All-American (1947); Consensus second-team All-American (1943)
Medals
Head Coach for United States
Men's basketball
Gold medal – first place	1956 Melbourne	Team competition

Gerald Tucker (March 14, 1922 – May 29, 1979) was the head coach on the 1956 USA Men's Basketball Gold Medal Olympic Team. He was the coach of Bartlesville Phillips 66ers for four seasons from 1954 to 1958 having the most wins in the National Industrial Basketball League (NIBL) in each of those 4 seasons. In 1955 Bartlesville Phillips 66ers won the AAU National Basketball Championship against the Luckett-Nix Clippers of Boulder, Colorado, winning 66-64 and in 1956 they were the runners-up to the Buchan Bakers of Seattle, losing 59–57.

Before that he was a star center at 6 feet 6 inches (1.98 m) playing collegiately for the Oklahoma Sooners and in the Amateur Athletic Union (AAU). In 1943 and 1947 he was named a Helms Foundation All American. In 1947 he was the Helms Foundation Player of the Year. He went on to play for Bartlesville Phillips 66ers of the NIBL, where he was an AAU All American and made the AAU All-Star Basketball Team, which was based on how one played in the National AAU Basketball Tournament in 1949 and 1950.

In 1989 he was named to the Final Four All 40's Team. Also Kansas Hall of Fame 2010, and Oklahoma Sooner Hall of Fame 2014.
