= Forrest DeBernardi =

American basketball player

Personal information
- Born: February 3, 1899 Nevada, Missouri, U.S.
- Died: April 29, 1970 (aged 71) Dallas, Texas, U.S.
- Listed height: 6 ft 1 in (1.85 m)

Career information
- High school: Iola (Iola, Kansas); Northeast (Kansas City, Missouri)
- College: Westminster (MO) (1919–1921)
- Playing career: 1920–1929
- Position: Center

Career history
- 1920–1922: Kansas City AC
- 1922–1927: Hillyard Shine Alls
- 1927–1929: Cook's Painter Boys

Career highlights
- 5× AAU champion (1921, 1926–1929); 5× AAU All-American (1921, 1922, 1925–1927); 2× Helms All-American (1920, 1921); 2× First-team All-MIAA (1920, 1921)
- Basketball Hall of Fame
- Collegiate Basketball Hall of Fame

Forrest Sale "Red" DeBernardi (February 3, 1899 – April 29, 1970) was an American college basketball player in the 1920s. Standing 6 ft. 1 inches tall, DeBernardi was one of the best centers of his era, and played all five positions. Born in Nevada, Missouri, he attended Westminster College where he played from 1919 to 1921. DeBernardi also competed in tennis, baseball, and track and field at Westminster College. On January 19, 1920, he made 24 field goals against Missouri Wesleyan, a school record that stands to this day. DeBernardi then transferred to the University of Kansas in order to be closer to the Kansas City Athletic Club so that he could compete for them in the Amateur Athletic Union (AAU). He did not play for the university, however.

Following his impressive collegiate career, DeBernardi became an outstanding AAU player. Between 1920 and 1929, when he played with Kansas City Athletic Club (1920–22), Hillyard Shine Alls (1922–27) and Cook's Painter Boys (1927–29), he played in 10 national AAU tournaments and was named to the AAU All-American team five times. DeBernardi was also an AAU national champion five times.

In 1938 the Associated Press selected DeBernardi as the center on its All-Time All America college basketball team. He was also awarded with the Helms Athletic Foundation Hall of Fame Award in 1952. In 1961, DeBernardi was elected to the Basketball Hall of Fame. In 2006, he was elected posthumously into the National Collegiate Basketball Hall of Fame.
