= Jack McCracken =

American basketball player

Personal information
- Born: June 15, 1912 Chickasha, Oklahoma, U.S.
- Died: January 5, 1958 (aged 45) Denver, Colorado, U.S.
- Listed height: 6 ft 2 in (1.88 m)

Career information
- High school: Classen (Oklahoma City, Oklahoma)
- College: Northwest Missouri State (1929–1932)
- Position: Forward
- Number: 3

Career highlights
- 6× AAU All-American (1932, 1937–1939, 1942, 1945); 3× First-team All-MIAA (1930–1932)
- Basketball Hall of Fame
- Collegiate Basketball Hall of Fame

Jack D. "Jumping Jack" McCracken (June 15, 1912 – January 5, 1958) was an American basketball player in the 1930s and 1940s.

A native of Chickasha, Oklahoma, McCracken went to Classen High School in Oklahoma City, Oklahoma. He attended Northwest Missouri State Teachers College (now Northwest Missouri State University) in Maryville, Missouri and played for coach Henry Iba, who had also coached him in high school. McCracken never turned professional.

After leaving Northwest Missouri State Teachers College, he went to Denver, Colorado, to play in the AAU.
