= Gordon Carpenter =

American basketball player and coach

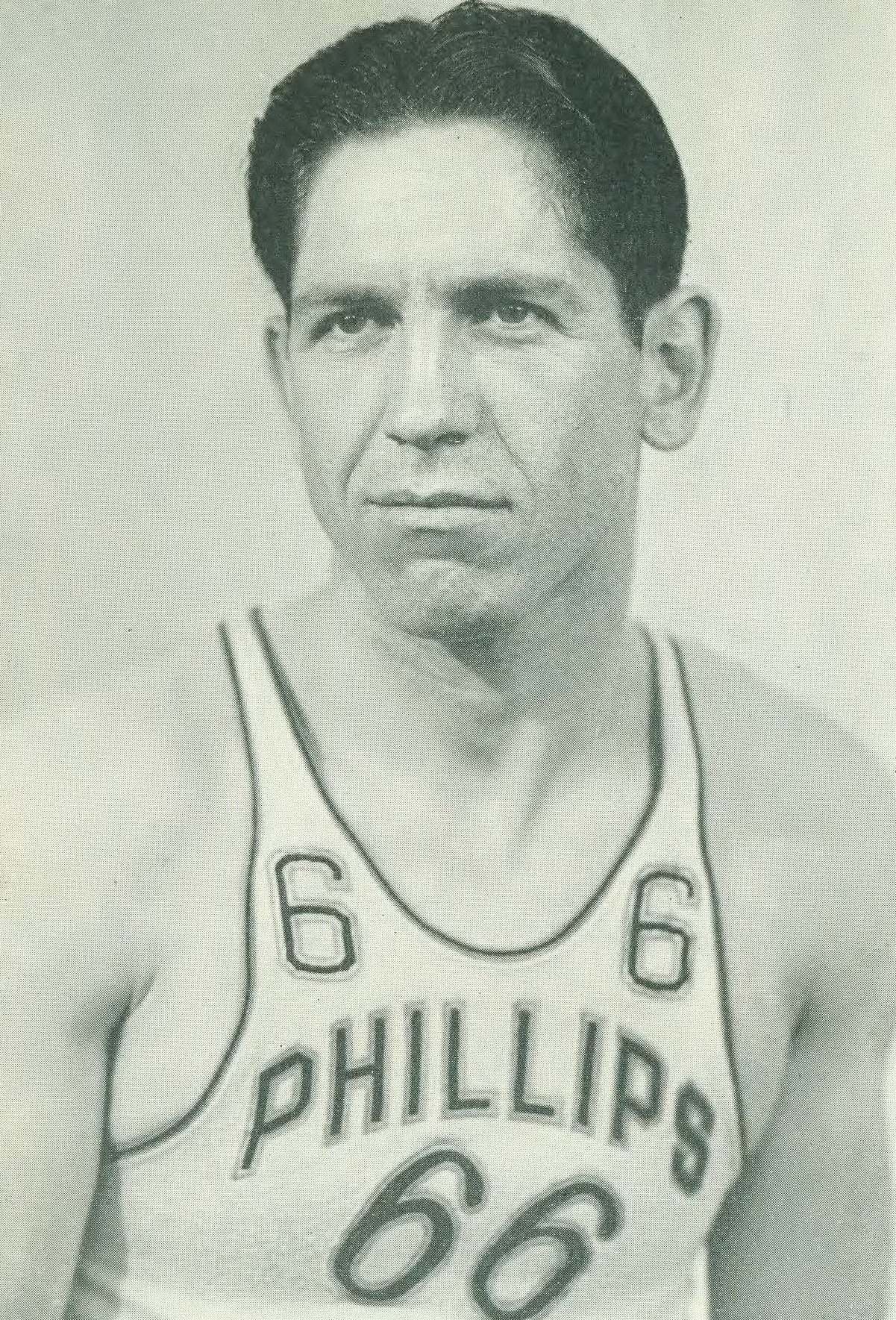
- Carpenter with the Phillips 66ers

Personal information
- Born: September 24, 1919 Ash Flat, Arkansas, U.S.
- Died: March 8, 1988 (aged 68)
- Listed height: 6 ft 6 in (1.98 m)
- Listed weight: 220 lb (100 kg)

Career information
- High school: Ash Flat (Ash Flat, Arkansas)
- College: Arkansas (1940–1943)
- Position: Forward

Career highlights
- 6× AAU All-American (1943–1947, 1950); First-team All-SWC (1943)

Gordon "Shorty" Carpenter (September 24, 1919 – March 8, 1988) was an American basketball player, and part of gold medal winning American basketball team at the 1948 Summer Olympics.

Born in Ash Flat, Arkansas and nicknamed Shorty despite his 6-foot, 6 inch frame, Carpenter played his college basketball at the University of Arkansas, where he was an All-Southwest Conference performer in 1943. He later played AAU basketball for both the Phillips 66ers and Denver Chevrolets, making AAU All-American teams each year from 1943 to 1947.

He coached the United States men's national basketball team at the 1950 FIBA World Championship, winning the silver medal.

Carpenter was named to the Arkansas Sports Hall of Fame and the Helms Athletic Hall of Fame. Following his playing career, he became a referee with the Big Eight Conference.
