= Ace Gruenig =

American basketball player (1913–1958)

Personal information
- Born: March 12, 1913 Chicago, Illinois, U.S.
- Died: August 11, 1958 (aged 45) Del Norte, Colorado, U.S.
- Listed height: 6 ft 8 in (2.03 m)
- Listed weight: 220 lb (100 kg)

Career information
- High school: Crane Tech (Chicago, Illinois)
- Position: Center

Career history
- 1932–1933: Chicago Rosenberg-Arvey
- 1933–1934: Chicago Fast Freighters
- 1934–1935: Denver Piggly Wiggly
- 1935–1938: Denver Safeway
- 1938–1940: Denver Nuggets
- 1940–1941: Denver
- 1941–1943: Denver American Legion
- 1943–1946: Denver Ambrose Jellymakers
- 1946–1947: Denver Nuggets
- 1947–1948: Denver Murphy Mahoney
- 1948–1949: Denver Nuggets

Career highlights
- 10× AAU All-American (1937–1940, 1942–1946, 1948); 3× AAU national champion (1937, 1939, 1942)
- Basketball Hall of Fame

Robert F. "Ace" Gruenig (March 12, 1913 – August 11, 1958) was an American basketball player during the 1930s and 1940s.

The 6 ft. 8 in. (203 cm) Gruenig is considered one of the game's first great big men. The Chicago, Illinois native led his high school, Crane Tech, to the Chicago Public High School League championship in 1931. He attended Northwestern University, but withdrew after his freshman year without having played for the varsity. While playing for several AAU teams in the following decade, Gruenig was named AAU All-America 10 times (1937–40, 1942–46, 1948). Furthermore, he led the Denver Safeway (1937), Denver Nuggets (1939) and Denver American Legion (1942) teams to AAU championships. On August 11, 1963, Gruenig was enshrined to the Basketball Hall of Fame.
