= Gale Bishop =

American basketball player

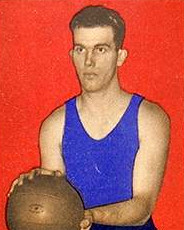
- Bishop in 1948

Personal information
- Born: June 4, 1922 Sumas, Washington, U.S.
- Died: December 26, 2003 (aged 81) Lynden, Washington, U.S.
- Listed height: 6 ft 3 in (1.91 m)
- Listed weight: 195 lb (88 kg)

Career information
- College: Washington State (1941–1943, 1945–1946)
- Playing career: 1944–1949
- Position: Forward
- Number: 11

Career history
- 1944: Fircrest Dairy
- 1946–1948: Bellingham Fricrests
- 1948–1949: Philadelphia Warriors

Career highlights
- Consensus first-team All-American (1943); 2× First-team All-PCC (1943, 1946)
- Stats at NBA.com
- Stats at Basketball Reference

Robert Gale Bishop (June 4, 1922 – December 26, 2003) was an American professional basketball player.

Born in Sumas, Washington, he played collegiately for the Washington State University.

He played for the Philadelphia Warriors (1948–49) in the BAA for 56 games.

Bishop died on December 26, 2003, in Tacoma, Washington.

== BAA career statistics ==
Legend
GP	Games played
FG%	Field-goal percentage
FT%	Free-throw percentage
APG	Assists per game
PPG	Points per game

=== Regular season ===
Year	Team	GP	FG%	FT%	APG	PPG
1948–49	Philadelphia	56	.325	.651	1.6	8.3
Career		56	.325	.651	1.6	8.3

=== Playoffs ===
Year	Team	GP	FG%	FT%	APG	PPG
1948–49	Philadelphia	2	.269	.500	1.0	9.0
Career		2	.269	.500	1.0	9.0
