= Hillyard, Inc. =

American cleaning products company

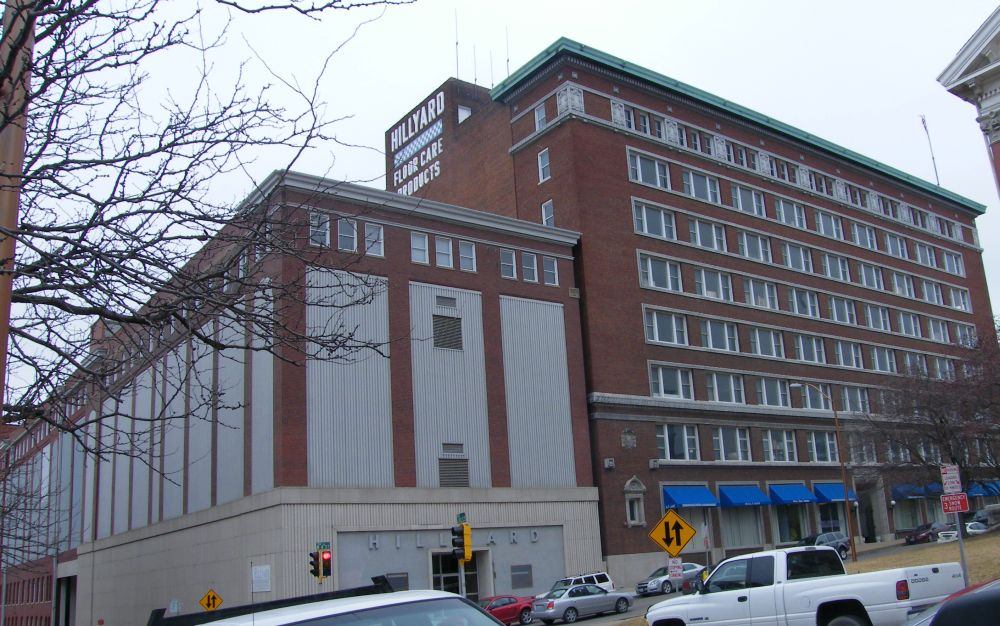
Hillyard headquarters in St. Joseph

Hillyard, Inc. (earlier known as Hillyard Disinfectant Company and Hillyard Chemical Company) is a privately owned cleaning products company in St. Joseph, Missouri with a speciality in providing products for cleaning and maintenance of wood basketball courts.

The company fielded two Amateur Athletic Union national champion basketball teams in the 1920s and was instrumental in the founding of the Basketball Hall of Fame (where an exhibit celebrates its contributions to the sport).

In 2007 the company had an estimated $120 million in sales and employed 600 people.

Newton S. Hillyard founded the company in 1907 as a cleaning supplies manufacturer. Hillyard's son Marvin asked him to sponsor a basketball team. N.S. then developed the company's signature cleaning supplies that made the floors "less oily."

In 1920 the company moved to a new building that included a 90 x 140 foot wood gymnasium floor—claimed to be the largest west of the Mississippi River at the company headquarters where the company tested gym seals and finishes.

The company then sponsored the Hillyard Shine Alls basketball team that won the Amateur Athletic Union national championships in 1926 and 1927 (and also played in two other AAU national championships in 1923 and 1925). The team was led by Forrest DeBernardi.

During the Hillyard domination charges surfaced that Hillyard was paying its amateur players or that the players had no-show jobs at the plant. The controversy passed without any formal action taken against the company.

Elliot C. Spratt, a Hillyard son-in-law, was the founding president of the Basketball Hall of Fame.

The National Association of Basketball Coaches gives the Newton S. Hillyard Memorial Award to its outgoing president.

Other Hillyard family members including Haskell Hillyard have received the John W. Bunn Lifetime Achievement Award at the Basketball Hall of Fame.

Hillyard plays a major role at Missouri Western State University. Spratt Stadium is named for Elliot C. Spratt. The Hillyard Tip Off Classic is a basketball tournament at the school.
