= Cook Paint and Varnish Company =

American paint and varnish manufacturer

Cook Paint and Varnish Company was a paint and varnish manufacturer in the Kansas City metropolitan area from 1913 until 1991.

== History ==
The paint factory was established in 1913 at 21st and Broadway in Kansas City by Charles R. Cook. (1884-1949) In 1927 it moved to North Kansas City, Missouri. By 1930, Cook had established factories in Kansas City, St. Louis, Ft. Worth, Houston, Cincinnati and Detroit.

In 1991 the company was split up with Sherwin-Williams, Valspar and in 1982 Davis Paints acquired a license agreement to manufacture certain Architectural Coatings in Kansas CIty. Some paints are still sold under this license agreement under the Cook brand by Davis Paint in Kansas City.

The most visible connection to North Kansas City is the Cook Composites & Polymers Co. which is a subsidiary of Total S.A. and was run for many years by D. Patrick Curran, grandson of C.R. Cook.

It claims to be largest producer of polyester gel coats in the world and that, along with its affiliates, it is the second-largest producer of coating resins in the world.

== AAU Champions ==
Although a major employer in Kansas City its non paint interests got it the most attention including the Amateur Athletic Union basketball teams (known as the Cook's Paint Boys) it fielded and which won national championships in 1928 and 1929 at a time when sponsored corporate teams competed against university teams. The Painters defeated the Kansas City Athletic Club 25-23 in 1928 and Henry Clothiers of Wichita, Kansas 51-35 in 1929. The star of the Painters was Forrest DeBernardi.

== Broadcast interests ==
Cook Paints bought WHB radio in Kansas City in 1930. In 1953 it was awarded the contract to jointly own the new Channel 9 frequency. Under the arrangement, Cook would operate for 90 minutes as WHB-TV and then Midland Broadcasting Company would operate it as KMBC-TV. They would switch back and forth in such arrangement and have separate studios.

Cook sold its WHB franchise in 1954 and bought full rights to the channel 9 license, along with KMBC radio, keeping the KMBC call letters and keeping Midland's studios at the Victoria Theatre.

Cook sold KMBC-AM-TV in 1961 to Metromedia.

== See also ==
- Rodda Paint
