= McPherson Globe Refiners =

Defunct American basketball team

- Leagues: AAU 1934–1936
- Founded: 1933
- Folded: 1937
- Arena: McPherson Convention Center, McPherson, Kansas
- Capacity: 1,000
- Team colors: Red, white
- Ownership: Lario Oil & Gas Company
- Championships: 1936 Olympics gold medal (with the Universals); 1936 US Olympic tryouts 2nd 1936 AAU tournament 1st 1935 AAU Tournament 2nd

The McPherson Globe Refiners were an amateur basketball team in the 1930s. The Refiners contributed six members to the 1936 United States men's Olympic basketball team, the first basketball team to win the Olympic gold medal.

== History ==
Due to an oil discovery in McPherson County, Kansas, in the late 1920s, Lario Oil & Gas Company had its subsidiary, the Globe Oil & Refining Company, construct an oil refinery in the county seat: McPherson. The refinery was built in 1933, and soon was producing 200,000 gallons of gasoline per day. This output necessitated a marketing campaign to promote the growing retail gasoline business. Lario, like many in the early radio days and before television, sponsored Amateur Athletic Union (AAU) basketball teams to generate excitement for their product in the sport sections of widely read newspapers. For a small sponsorship fee, Lario Oil & Gas was able to reach many more consumers than by conventional advertising.

=== 1933–34 season ===
In its first year, the Globe Refinery started modestly with town team basketball drawn from the community, population 5,000. The Globe Refiners found success against other town teams from the surrounding area, and got a measure of themselves with stiffer competition in the form of AAU affiliated teams. The AAU teams offered players a steady Depression-era job, and the opportunity for those who had used up college eligibility to continue to improve their game skills. The AAU teams also allowed individuals to retain their amateur status. The Refiners entered the 1934 AAU National Tournament where they were bounced out in an early round.

=== 1934–35 season ===
Gene Johnson, an innovative AAU made his sales pitch to Lario management. For an outlay of $1,500, Johnson promised to recruit, train, and coach the Globe Refinery team to national success. Lario would get outstanding publicity and marketing value, and Johnson would get back to his native Kansas, where he earlier found success coaching at Wichita (State) University.

Johnson gathered top talent in the form of Joe Fortenberry as well as several players Johnson coached as Wichita Shockers. Fortenberry had leaping ability, and ran the court well for a 6'8" center. Johnson had another coach-on-the-floor, as his brother Francis directed both the zone pressure and fast break attacks. The attacking play upset many basketball traditions, which in the sport's first 40 years, was a slow and methodical game. The McPherson Globe Refiners were criticized for playing "bad" basketball with its fast and aggressive style. But in the tough AAU Missouri Valley League, the McPherson Globe Refiners won outright against more noted rivals from Denver and Kansas City.

The Globe Refiners carried this success to a second-place finish in the 1935 AAU National Tournament.

=== 1935–36 season ===
The Globe Refiners season started with high hopes, and by August 1936, a farm boy from McPherson County Kansas, Bill Wheatley, accepted the first Olympic gold medal from another Kansan, Dr. James Naismith. The McPherson Globe Refiners played a national schedule with barnstorming road trips to Louisiana, Washington, DC, and Madison Square Garden in New York City. Along the way to a 40 win, 6 loss year, the Refiners won the AAU Missouri Valley League for a second year running.

By mid-March, the McPherson Globe Refiners were the favorites in the AAU National, contested in Denver's City Auditorium. Naismith presided over the opening ceremonies, delivering his take on the game he invented some 45 years earlier to the 500 competitors divided among 54 teams. Before sold-out crowds, the Refiners won matches in the opening rounds knowing that getting to the AAU Final meant entry into the US Olympic tryouts, and the chance to make the 1936 US basketball team. The Globe Refiners triumphed in the AAU semi final over the Kansas City Trailers securing their tryouts berth, then beat the Universal Pictures Universals 47 to 35 in the 1936 AAU Final.

== 1936 US Olympic tryouts ==
Since basketball first became an Olympic medal sport in 1936, a new and national playoff system was developed for the US basketball team selection. The amateur ruling bodies devised a 10 regional district playoff system for college and university entrants, which later evolved into the March Madness of the NCAA's Final Four. Joining Universal Pictures and the McPherson team in Madison Square Garden were the five colleges advancing from the district playoffs:

- University of Arkansas
- DePaul
- Temple
- Utah State
- University of Washington

As winner of the YMCA National, the Wilmerding (PA) YMCA team earned the eighth and last slot. The quarter final winners were McPherson outscoring Temple, Universal Pictures over Arkansas, Washington beating DePaul, and the YMCA team besting Utah State. The semi final games were important because the US Olympic team would be chosen from those two winners. In the opener, the Universal movie men from California beat Wilmerding by 13, 42–29. The Globe Refiners qualified by out-running Washington 48 to 30. In an all AAU and extremely close final, Universal Pictures prevailed 44–43 over McPherson, becoming the U.S. national champions.

However, the U.S. plan for the 1936 Olympics in Berlin was for the Globe Refiners and the Universals to jointly comprise the United States Team USA, with the two remaining mostly separate squads, playing alternating games, both representing Team USA.

== First Olympic basketball victory ==
The 1936 Olympics, in Berlin, were the first Olympics to award medals in basketball. The 1936 United States Olympic Basketball team were an assembly of seven Universal Pictures Universals, six McPherson Globe Refiners, and one Huskie from Washington's third place team. On the strength of his team's tryout victory, Jimmy Needles became the head coach of the first United States men's Olympic basketball team, with Globe Refiners coach Gene Johnson serving as his assistant.

The U.S. plan for the 1936 Olympics in Berlin was for the Globe Refiners and the Universals to jointly comprise the United States Team USA, with the two remaining mostly separate squads, playing alternating games, both representing Team USA. Since the Universals were the qualifying tournament winners, they were supposed to play the first game — and also the last — in the Olympic gold medal game. However, their first opponent, Spain, defaulted, owing to the eruption of the Spanish Civil War, upsetting the sequence of the games. Consequently, the Globe Refiners wound up playing the final gold medal game—against Canada.

Per the German hosts' insistence, the game was played on an outdoor clay court (the first and last time that would happen) in heavy rain, preventing dribbling and complicating play. The Globe Refiners beat the Canadians 19–8 (a record low score). They were awarded their gold medals at the Olympics, by basketball's inventor: fellow Kansan James Naismith. (Their Team USA teammates, the Universals, received their gold medals in the mail, back in Los Angeles).

== Notable players ==
- Joe Fortenberry
- Francis Johnson
- Jack Ragland
- Bill Wheatley
- Tex Gibbons
- Willard Schmidt
- Vernon Vaughn

== McPherson Globe Refiners legacy ==
- Developed the full court, zone pressure defense
  - Naismith Memorial Basketball Hall of Fame coach Ralph Miller in 1980 stated: "Louisville still uses the 2–2–1 zone press today almost exactly as Gene Johnson designed it."
- Used the fast break to speed up basketball's pace
  - Gene Johnson explained: "We pushed the ball up the court and forced the game into bad basketball, and we played bad basketball better than anybody."
- Dunked the ball to intimidate the opposition
  - Pulitzer Prize-winning New York Times sportswriter Arthur Daley after watching the McPherson Refiners dunk: "They ... pitched the ball downward into the hoop, much like a cafeteria customer dunking a roll in coffee."
  - Time magazine identified the McPherson's Globe Refiners as the "oddest basketballers" and "athletic freaks" who have "perfected a technique called 'dunking' with which they score by jumping up above the basket, dropping the ball into it."
- During the 1936 tournaments (Denver, New York, Berlin), they met basketball's inventor, James Naismith.
- Started the United States dominance in Olympic basketball by winning the first gold medal.
