= 1936 United States men's Olympic basketball team =

- Head coach: Jimmy Needles
- Scoring leader: (United States) Joe Fortenberry (7.3)
- Biggest win: 33 vs. Philippines

The 1936 United States men's Olympic basketball team competed in the Games of the XI Olympiad in Berlin, representing the United States of America, and was coached by Jimmy Needles of the Amateur Athletic Union's (AAU) Universal Pictures team. Gene Johnson of Wichita University assisted Needles, while Joe Reilly served as the team's director. 1936 was the first year that basketball was an official medal sport (it had been a demonstration sport in 1904). The U.S. won the first gold medal, defeating Canada, 19–8, in a gold medal match played outdoors on a clay and sand court in the rain. James Naismith, the game's inventor, watched many of the 1936 Olympic basketball matches, and helped award medals at the end of the basketball competition.

== Roster ==
Roster for the 1936 Olympics.

Name	Position	Height	Weight	Age	Home Town	Team/School
Sam Balter	Guard	5'10"	150	26	Los Angeles, California	Universal Pictures (UCLA)
Ralph Bishop	Forward	6'3"	185	21	Yakima, Washington	Washington
Joe Fortenberry	Center	6'8"	185	25	Happy, Texas	McPherson Globe Refiners (West Texas State)
Tex Gibbons	Guard	6'1"	175	28	Elk City, Oklahoma	McPherson Globe Refiners (Southwestern)
Francis Johnson	Guard	5'11"	175	26	Hartford, Kansas	McPherson Globe Refiners (Wichita)
Carl Knowles	Forward	6'2"	165	26	Los Angeles, California	Universal Pictures (UCLA)
Frank Lubin	Forward	6'7"	225	26	Glendale, California	Universal Pictures (UCLA)
Art Mollner	Guard	6'0"	160	23	Westlake Village, California	Universal Pictures (Los Angeles CC)
Donald Piper	Guard	5'11"	160	25	Peoria, Illinois	Universal Pictures (UCLA)
Jack Ragland	Guard	6'0"	175	30	Tucson, Arizona	McPherson Globe Refiners (Wichita)
Willard Schmidt	Center	6'8"	190	26	Swanton, Nebraska	McPherson Globe Refiners (Creighton)
Carl Shy	Guard	6'0"	170	27	Hollywood, California	Universal Pictures (UCLA)
Duane Swanson	Forward	6'2"	175	22	Waterman, Illinois	Universal Pictures (USC)
Bill Wheatley	Forward	6'2"	175	27	Kipp, Kansas	McPherson Globe Refiners (Kansas Wesleyan)

== Olympic trials ==
As was the custom at the time, the Olympic trials consisted of a tournament between top teams from the AAU, the YMCA and the National Collegiate Athletic Association. One notably absent team from the tournament was the 1935–36 Long Island Blackbirds, who had just completed a 25–0 season behind stars Jules Bender, Ben Kramer and Art Hillhouse. The largely Jewish Blackbirds team boycotted the trials due to the games being held in Berlin amidst rising antisemitism in Germany. LIU president Tristram Walker Metcalfe stated: "Our conviction that the United States should not participate in the Olympic Games since they are being held in Germany has not been altered by the fact that our basketball team is now recognized generally as a possible Olympic representative. Such participation would be indirect, if not direct, contribution of the raising of funds to finance such participation."

Since basketball first became an Olympic medal sport in 1936, a new and national playoff system was developed for the US basketball team selection. The ruling bodies devised a 10 regional district playoff system for college and university entrants, which later evolved into the March Madness of the NCAA's Final Four. Joining the AAU's two top teams – the Universal Pictures Universals (Hollywood/Los Angeles, California) and the McPherson Globe Refiners team (McPherson, Kansas) – in Madison Square Garden, were the five colleges advancing from the district playoffs:

- University of Arkansas
- DePaul University
- Temple University
- Utah State University
- University of Washington

As winner of the YMCA National, the Wilmerding (PA) YMCA team earned the eighth and last slot. The quarterfinal winners were McPherson outscoring Temple, Universal Pictures over Arkansas, Washington beating DePaul, and the YMCA team besting Utah State. The semifinal games were important because the US Olympic team would be chosen from those two winners. In the opener, the Universal movie men from California beat Wilmerding by 13, 42–29. The Globe Refiners qualified by out-running Washington 48 to 30. In an all-AAU and extremely close final, Universal Pictures prevailed 44–43 over McPherson, becoming the U.S. national champions.

== Olympic tournament ==
As the U.S. team arrived, they were made aware of several FIBA rules that were quite different than what the team was accustomed to in the States. There was no three second rule (which had then just been introduced to U.S. play), teams were limited to rosters of seven total players, and all games were to be played outdoors on a surface which was a mixture of sand and clay and which had been that of a tennis court. Needles successfully protested another stipulation – that players had to be 6'2" or shorter to compete. To get around the seven-player team limit, Needles split the squad into two teams – one featuring the McPherson Globe Refiners players and collegian Ralph Bishop, and one featuring the AAU Universal players – and alternated them for each match.

Their first match was won in a forfeit, as their scheduled opponent Spain, in the throes of the Spanish Civil War, never showed up. In the second match, the Universal team routed Estonia, by a score of 52–28. A McPherson-led win over the Philippines landed the Americans in the medal round, where they defeated Mexico, to reach the gold medal game.

The gold medal game was played after a day of rain, and the weather conditions put a damper on the Canadian national team's trademark fast break playing style. The two teams were only able to manage a combined total of eight points in the second half of play, due to the downpour, and the U.S. won the gold medal with a 19–8 victory.

=== Results ===
- United States 2, Spain 0 (forfeit)
- United States 52, Estonia 28
- United States 56, Philippines 23
- United States 25, Mexico 10
- United States 19, Canada 8
