= 1904 in basketball =

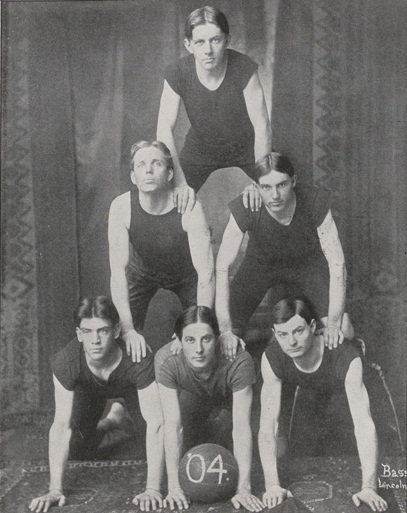
1904 Nebraska Cornhuskers junior men's basketball team

The following are the basketball events of the year 1904 throughout the world.

== Tournaments ==
=== Men's tournaments ===
==== Olympics ====
- 1904 Summer Olympics at St. Louis, featured basketball as a demonstration sport.
  - Champion: Buffalo German YMCA
  - Collegiate champion: Hiram College, in the first basketball tournament ever held limited exclusively to college teams
  - High school champion: New York
  - Elementary school champion: New York
