= List of AAU men's basketball champions =

Amateur Athletic Union Tournament
- Sport: Basketball
- Country: United States
- Most titles: Phillips 66ers (11)

The Amateur Athletic Union Tournament is the annual American amateur basketball championship series for Amateur Athletic Union (AAU) teams. It started in 1897 and has continued until present. Most finals have been played in a single final format, apart from some occasions that the winner's tournament had been decided by a round robin format.

Later, professional players like David Robinson, Larry Brown, and Gregg Popovich were crowned champions of the AAU. Popovich and Robinson represented the U.S. Armed Forces All-Stars. Between 1920 and 1950, some of the strongest basketball teams in the United States were sponsored by corporations, including Phillips 66, 20th Century Fox, Safeway Inc., Caterpillar Inc., and others.

== History ==
By the early 1930s, a few teams had earned reputations for basketball excellence and produced AAU All-Americans such as Forrest DeBernardi, Melvin Miller and Chuck Hyatt. In 1936 the significance of the tournament soared as it became integral part of the process to select US first Olympic team. When the stakes became higher, the competition between AAU and NCAA grew more intense as each organization asserted its claim to represent the US in international competition
But the AAU tournaments came to rise during the 1950s and 1960s with teams like the Phillips 66ers, the Peoria Caterpillars, the Akron Goodyears, the Denver D-C Truckers and the Wichita Vickers. These teams played a full schedule each season, topping 30 games a year and traveling throughout the country. Some of them also helped introduce the American style of basketball to foreign players. In 1956, the Buchan Bakers played games in Japan, the Philippines, France, Italy, Czechoslovakia, Poland and Spain.
During the 1950s, the rosters of the top amateur teams were filled with former college stars, many of whom had been drafted by the NBA, which was still in its formative years. The amateur teams sometimes offered more money than the pro teams as well as the security of full-time employment. AAU basketball was particularly strong in the Midwest, Southwest and West Coast, where the NBA had not yet established a presence.
The top teams also played in the National Industrial Basketball League, which began play in the 1947–48 season, two years before the establishment of the NBA. The NIBL had as many as eleven teams for the 1951–52 season and had nine teams during its next to last season in 1959–60. The Phillips 66ers won the NIBL title 11 of the leagues 14 years of existence.
But the goal for all these teams was winning the National AAU Tournament, held each year in Denver. The tournament field was determined by play in regional AAU tournaments, and included the top industrial teams, armed services teams, and often teams just put together for the tournament. Between 1943 and 1963, the Phillips 66ers won the tournament 10 times and the Peoria Caterpillars won five times. But there was always a chance for a surprise team to slip past the favorites. The Buchan Bakers, long shots at the outset of the tournament, won the national championship in 1956. Other one-time winners included the Oakland Bittners, led by Don Barksdale, in 1949 and Stewart Chevrolet, led by George Yardley, in 1951.
The appeal of AAU basketball began to decline in the early 1960s as the NBA gained prominence with such players as Bill Russell, Wilt Chamberlain, Elgin Baylor, Oscar Robertson and Jerry West. The NIBL folded in 1961, and with expansion of the NBA and the formation of the American Basketball Association in the late 1960s, the annual National AAU Tournament faded from prominence.

== AAU Champions ==
1897 New York 23 Street YMCA (1) (Round Robin)
1898 not held
1899 New York Knickerbocker Athletic Club (1) (Round Robin)
1900 New York Knickerbocker Athletic Club (2) (Round Robin)
1901 Ravenwood YMCA (1)
1902 not held
1903 not held
1904 Buffalo Germans (1) (Round Robin)
1905 Kansas City Athletic Club (1)
1910 National Guard Co. F
1911 not held
1912 not held
1913 Armour Square Cornells (1) (Round Robin)
1914 Armour Square Cornells (2)
1915 San Francisco Olympic Club (1)
1916 University of Utah Utes (1)
1917 Illinois Athletic Club (1)
1918 not held due to World War I
1919 Los Angeles Athletic Club (1)
1920 New York University Violets (1)
1921 Kansas City Athletic Club (2)
1922 Lowe and Campbell (1)
1923 Kansas City Athletic Club (3)
1924 Butler University Bulldogs (1)
1925 Washburn College Ichabods (1)
1926 Hillyard Chemical Shine Alls (1)
1927 Hillyard Chemical Shine Alls (2)
1928 Cook's Paint Boys (1)
1929 Cook's Paint Boys (2)
1930 Wichita Clothiers(1)
1931 Wichita Clothiers (2)
1932 Wichita Clothiers (3)
1933 Diamond DX Oilers (1)
1934 Diamond DX Oilers (2)
1935 South Kansas Stage Lines (1)
1936 Globe Refiners (1)
1937 Denver Safeway Stores (1)
1938 Healey Motors (1)
1939 Denver Nuggets (2)
1940 Phillips 66ers (1)
1941 20th Century Fox (1)
1942 Denver American Legion (3)
1943 Phillips 66ers (2)
1944 Phillips 66ers (3)
1945 Phillips 66ers (4)
1946 Phillips 66ers (5)
1947 Phillips 66ers (6)
1948 Phillips 66ers (7)
1949 Oakland Bittners (1)
1950 Phillips 66ers (8)
1951 Stewart Chevrolet (1)
1952 Peoria Caterpillars (1)
1953 Peoria Caterpillars (2)
1954 Peoria Caterpillars (3)
1955 Phillips 66ers (9)
1956 Buchan Bakers (1)
1957 U.S. Air Force All-Stars (1)
1958 Peoria Caterpillars (4)
1959 Wichita Vickers (1)
1960 Peoria Caterpillars (5)
1961 Cleveland Pipers (1)
1962 Phillips 66ers (10)
1963 Phillips 66ers (11)
1964 Akron Goodyear Wingfoots (1)
1965 U.S. Armed Forces All-Stars (1)
1966 Ford Mustangs (1)
1967 Goodyear Wingfoots (2)
1968 U.S. Armed Forces All-Stars (2)
1969 U.S. Armed Forces All-Stars (3)
1970 U.S. Armed Forces All-Stars (4)
1971 U.S. Armed Forces All-Stars (5)
1972 U.S. Armed Forces All-Stars (6)
1973 Marathon Oil (1)
1974 Jacksonville All-Stars (1)
1975 Capital Insulation (1)
1976 Athletes in Action (1)
1977 U.S. Armed Forces All-Stars (7)
1978 Joliet Christian Youth Center (1)
1979 Joliet Christian Youth Center (2)
1980 Airliner Basketball Club (1)
1981 Brewster-Heights Packing (1)
1982 Brewster-Heights Packing (2)
1983 Houston Flyers (1)
1984 Paul-Son Dice (1)
1985 Brewster-Heights Packing (3)
1986 Continental/Coors (1)
1987 Brewster-Heights Packing (4)
1988 Brewster-Heights Packing (5)
1989 U.S. Armed Forces All-Stars (8)
1990 Sam Ragnone Attorney (1)
1991 Lafayette Hustlers (1)
1992 Sam Ragnone Attorney (2)
1993 USA Verich Reps (1)
1994 MNS Stars (1)
1999 Palmer's Tornadoes (1)
2000 Palmer's Tornadoes (2)
2005 The New Beginnings B.C. (1)

== Finals ==
Year	Venue	Champion	Score	Runner-Up
1905	Francis Field	Kansas City Athletic Club		Buffalo Germans
1915	Chicago	San Francisco Olympic Club	26–16	Whittier College (CA)
1916	Convention Hall	University of Utah Utes	28–17	Illinois Athletic Club
1917	Convention Hall	Illinois Athletic Club	17–14	Brigham Young University Cougars
1920	Convention Hall	New York University Violets	47–24	Rutgers University Scarlet Knights
1921	Convention Hall	Kansas City Athletic Club		Southwestern College of Winfield Moundbuilders
1922	Convention Hall	Lowe and Campbell	42–28	Kansas City Athletic Club
1923	Convention Hall	Kansas City Athletic Club	31–18	Hillyard Chemical Shine Alls
1924	Convention Hall	Butler University Bulldogs	30–26	Kansas City Athletic Club
1925	Convention Hall	Washburn College Ichabods	42–30	Hillyard Chemical Shine Alls
1926	Convention Hall	Hillyard Chemical Shine Alls	25–20	Kansas City Athletic Club
1928	Convention Hall	Cook's Paint Boys	25–23	Kansas City Athletic Club
1929	Convention Hall	Cook's Paint Boys	51–35	Wichita Clothiers
1930	Convention Hall	Wichita Clothiers	29–16	San Francisco Olympic Club
1931	Convention Hall	Wichita Clothiers	38–14	Kansas City Athletic Club
1932	Convention Hall	Wichita Clothiers	15–14	Northwest Missouri State Bearcats
1933	Convention Hall	Diamond DX Oilers	25-23	Chicago Rosenberg-Arvey
1934	Convention Hall	Diamond DX Oilers	29–19	Wyoming University Cowboys
1935	Convention Hall	South Kansas Stage Lines	45–26	Globe Refiners
1936	Convention Hall	McPherson Globe Refiners	47–35	Universal Pictures
1937	Denver Auditorium Arena	Denver Safeway Stores	43–38	Phillips 66ers
1938	Denver Auditorium Arena	Healy Motors	40–38	Denver Safeway Stores
1939	Denver Auditorium Arena	Denver Nuggets	25–22	Phillips 66ers
1940	Denver Auditorium Arena	Phillips 66ers	39–36	Denver Nuggets
1941	Denver Auditorium Arena	20th Century Fox	47–34	San Francisco Olympic Club
1942	Denver Auditorium Arena	Denver American Legion	45–32	Phillips 66ers
1943	Denver Auditorium Arena	Phillips 66ers	39–36	Denver Nuggets
1944	Denver Auditorium Arena	Phillips 66ers	50–43	Denver Ambrose-Legion
1945	Denver Auditorium Arena	Phillips 66ers	47–46	Denver Ambrose Jellymakers
1946	Denver Auditorium Arena	Phillips 66ers	45–34	San Diego Dons
1947	Denver Auditorium Arena	Phillips 66ers	62–41	Oakland Bittners
1948	Denver Auditorium Arena	Phillips 66ers	62–48	Denver Nuggets
1949	Denver Auditorium Arena	Oakland Bittners	55–51	Phillips 66ers
1950	Denver Auditorium Arena	Phillips 66ers	65–42	Oakland Blue 'n Gold Atlas
1951	Denver Auditorium Arena	Stewart Chevrolet	76–55	Poudre Valley Creamery
1952	Denver Auditorium Arena	Peoria Cats	66–53	Phillips 66ers
1953	Denver Auditorium Arena	Peoria Cats	73–62	Los Alamitos NAS
1954	Denver Auditorium Arena	Peoria Cats	63–55	Grihalva Motors
1955	Denver Auditorium Arena	Phillips 66ers	66–64	Luckett-Nix Clippers
1956	Denver Auditorium Arena	Buchan Bakers	59–57	Phillips 66ers
1957	Denver Auditorium Arena	US Armed Forces All-Stars	87–74	San Francisco Olympic Club
1958	Denver Auditorium Arena	Peoria Cats	74–71 (3 OT)	Denver-Chicago Truckers
1959	Denver Auditorium Arena	Wichita Vickers	105–84	Phillips 66ers
1960	Denver Auditorium Arena	Peoria Cats	87–73	Akron Wingfoots
1961	Denver Auditorium Arena	Cleveland Pipers	107–96	Denver-Chicago Truckers
1962	Denver Auditorium Arena	Phillips 66ers	70–58	Denver-Chicago Truckers
1963	Denver Auditorium Arena	Phillips 66ers	100–70	Denver-Chicago Truckers
1964	Denver Auditorium Arena	Akron Wingfoots	86–78	Phillips 66ers
1965	Denver Auditorium Arena	US Armed Forces All-Stars	77–75	Denver Capitol Federal
1966	Denver Auditorium Arena	Ford Mustangs	71–67	Phillips 66ers
1967	Denver Auditorium Arena	Akron Wingfoots	77–72	Phillips 66ers
1968	Denver Auditorium Arena	U.S. Armed Forces All-Stars	73–69	Vaughn Reality
1970	Columbia, South Carolina	U.S. Armed Forces All-Stars		Columbia Sertoma
1971	London, Kentucky	U.S. Armed Forces All-Stars	91–77	Marathon Oil
1976	Baton Rouge, Louisiana	Athletes in Action	80–79	U.S. Armed Forces All-Stars
1979	Ponca City, Oklahoma	Joliet Christian Youth Center	110–100	U.S. Armed Forces All-Stars
1982	Portland, Oregon	Brewster-Heights Packing	93–91	Lexington Marathon Oil
1983	Ponca City, Oklahoma	Houston Flyers		Brewster-Heights Packing
1989	Topeka, Kansas	U.S. Armed Forces All-Stars		Sam Ragnone Attorney
1990	Topeka, Kansas	Sam Ragnone Attorney	97–92	Indiana Lafayette Hustlers
1991	Topeka, Kansas	Lafayette Hustlers	97–92	Sam Ragnone Attorney
1993	Topeka, Kansas	USA Verich Reps		Shell & Widman-Elk Grove
1994	Topeka, Kansas	MNS Stars		Shell & Widman-Elk Grove
2000	Des Moines, Iowa	Palmer's Tornadoes		Shell & Widman-Elk Grove
2005	Des Moines, Iowa	The New Beginnings B.C.	101–98	San Francisco Pro Am/Gold Rush

== Total titles by club ==
Club	W	R	Winning years
Phillips 66ers	11	10	1940, 1943, 1944, 1945, 1946, 1947, 1948, 1950, 1955, 1962, 1963
U.S. Armed Forces All-Stars	8	2	1965, 1968, 1969, 1970, 1971, 1972, 1977, 1989
Brewster-Heights Packing	5	0	1981, 1982, 1985, 1987, 1988
Peoria Caterpillars	5	0	1952, 1953, 1954, 1958, 1960
Denver Nuggets	3	6	1937, 1939, 1942
Kansas City Athletic Club	3	3	1905, 1921, 1923
Wichita Clothiers	3	0	1930, 1931, 1932
Hillyard Chemical Shine Alls	2	2	1926, 1927
Akron Goodyear Wingfoots	2	1	1964, 1967
Sam Ragnone Attorney	2	0	1990, 1992
New York Knickerbocker Athletic Club	2	0	1898, 1899
Oakland Bittners	1	1	1949
Cleveland Pipers	1	0	1961
U.S. Air Force All-Stars	1	0	1957
20th Century Fox	1	0	1941

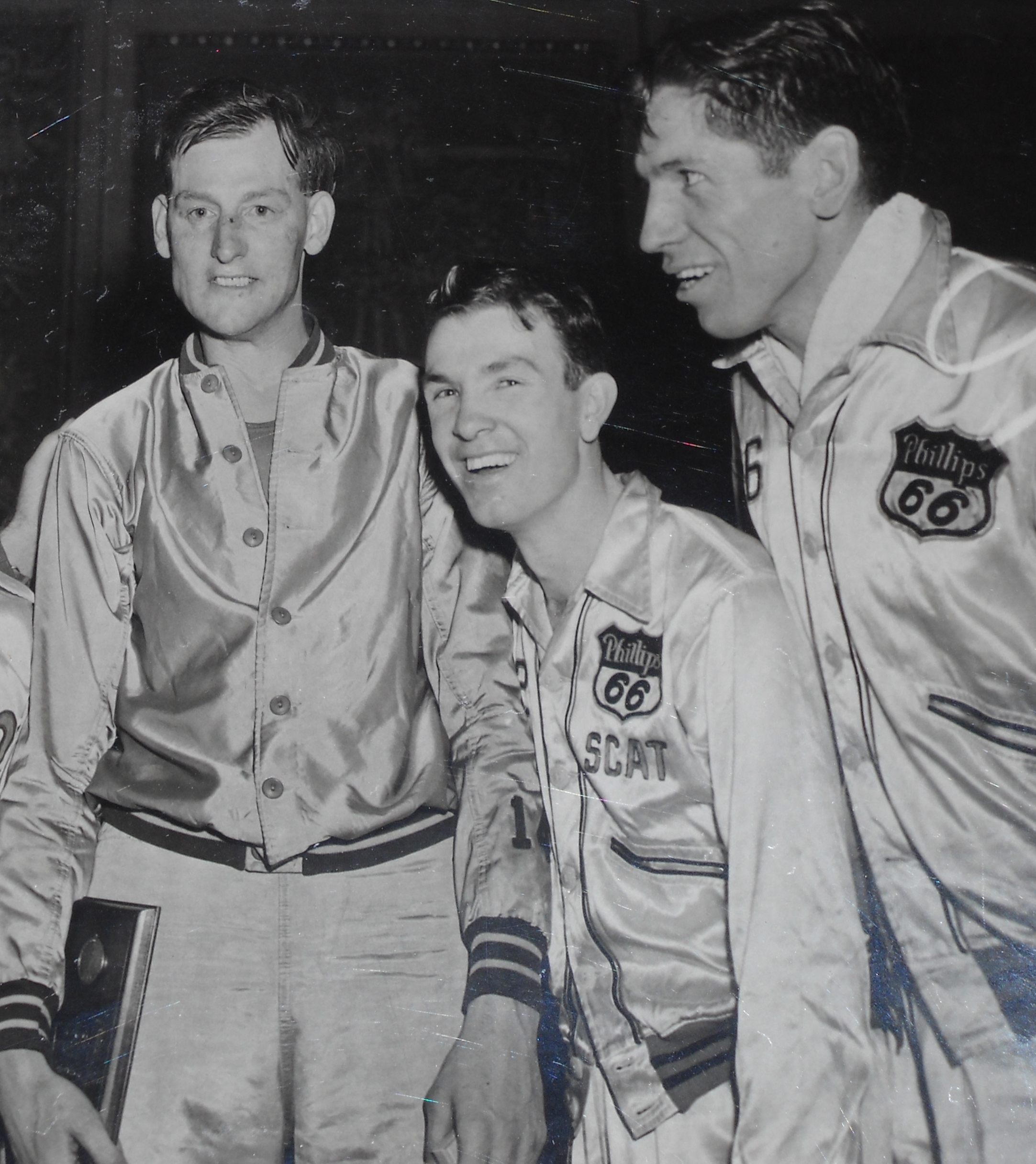
Robert Ace Gruenig was crowned champion 3 times with the Denver Nuggets

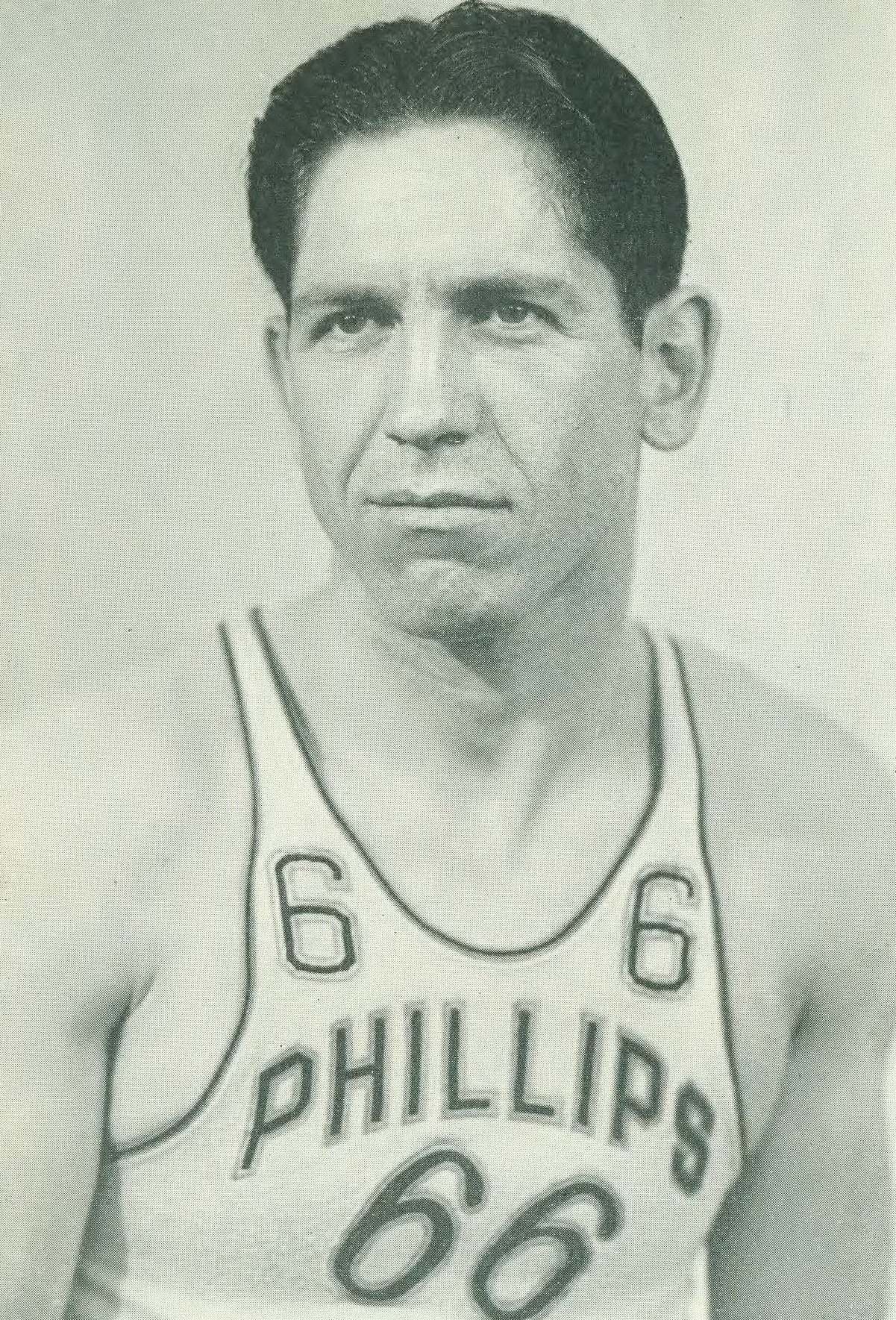
Shorty Carpenter was one of the star players with the Oilers, leading them to several titles

== Venues and Winning squads ==
=== 1897–1920: The beginnings ===
1898-1900 at New York 1898, Madison Square Garden, New York City: 23rd St. Y.M.C.A New York (later known as the New York Wanderers)
A.J. Abadie, A.C. Abadie, A. Shields, W. Reed, J. Hamill, Deitrich, Meyerhoff, J. Wendelken, G. Greif.
1899, Brooklyn, NYC: Knickerbocker A.C. New York
Weiss, Stripple, Cornish, Keawn, Dietrich, Reuss.
1900, Madison Square Garden, New York City: Knickerbocker A.C. New York
Quigg, Stripple, Brocker, Keawn, Linder, Reuss, Grennhall, Patterson. 1901: at Chicago 1901, at Chicago, Illinois: Ravenswood Y.M.C.A. Chicago, Illinois
Lorentzen, Rechard, Washburne, Albertson, Rowley, Stevens, Krafthefer.

=== 1904: St. Louis Olympic Basketball Tournament ===
1904: Francis Field, St. Louis, Missouri: Buffalo (Germans) Y.M.C.A. Buffalo, New York – at St. Louis, Missouri
Rhode, Manweiler, Monohan, Hardt, Miller, Redlein. 1910-1914: at Chicago
1910, Chicago, Illinois: Company F. Portage, Wisconsin, N.F.
Sheppard, Mueller, Ebert, Janda, Hinickle, S. Ernsperger, Swenholt, Harbor, Abell, F. Ernsperger, Schneider.
1913, Chicago, Illinois: Cornell (Armour Playground), Chicago, Illinois
A. Pressler, W. Pressler, Feeney, Johnson, Freeling, Kohfeldt.
1914, Chicago, Illinois: Cornell (Armour Playground), Chicago, Illinois
1915: at San Francisco
1915, San Francisco, California: Olympic Club of San Francisco, San Francisco, California
Berndt, J. Gilbert, R Gilbert, Stadfeldt, Schugert, Miller, Kemp.
1916 and 1917: at Chicago
1916, Chicago, Illinois: University of Utah, Salt Lake City, Utah
Dorton, Warner, Thorum, Smith, Breiben, Romney, Van Pelt, Clark, Parker, Goodrich.
1917, Chicago, Illinois: Illinois A.C. Chicago, Illinois
Kohfeldt, Elliot, D. Holland, Greisel, Cochrane, Feeney, A. Pressler (Capt), Frieling, W. Pressler, Egan.
1919: at Los Angeles 1919, Los Angeles, California: Los Angeles A.C. Los Angeles, California
Swann, Wilson, Laswell, Cooper, Slaighter (Capt.), Cate, Tate, Olney.
1920: at Atlanta 1920, Atlanta, Georgia: New York University
Holman, Goeller, Delaney, Cann, Storey (Capt.), Mooney, Baker.

=== 1921–1935: Kansas City venue ===
1921, Convention Hall, Kansas City: Kansas City, A.C.
Burrien, Saunders, Lonborg, Moberley, Singer, Davis, De Bernardi.
1922, Convention Hall, Kansas City: Lowe and Campbell, Kansas City
Browning, G. Williams, F. Williams, Reeves, Scott, Keyes, Buckner, Davidson.
1923, Convention Hall, Kansas City: Kansas City, A.C.
Williams, Trumbo, Harry Viner, Bobby Sanders, Francis Hess, George Reeves, George Williams, Milton Singer, George Browning.
1924, Convention Hall, Kansas City: Butler University of Indianapolis, Indianapolis, Indiana
Paul, Blessing, Strole, Conway, Reichel, Griggs, Keach, Jones, Middlesworth (Capt.), Hooker, Nipper, Harber.
1925, Convention Hall, Kansas City: Washburn College, Topeka, Kansas
Brewster, Peterson, Briethaupt (Capt), Lowe, Lonborg, Poart, McLaughlin, Spohn.
1926, Convention Hall, Kansas City: Hillyard, St, Joseph, Missouri
Earl Mueller, R. Hillyard D. Goodson, N Hillyard, C. Allen, George Rody, S. De Bernardi, G. Starbuck, John Wulf, R. Mosley, E. Giltner.
1927, Convention Hall, Kansas City: Hillyard, St Joseph, Missouri
Starbuck, Loveless, Wulf, Allen, De Bernardi, Mitchel, Hewitt.
1928, Convention Hall, Kansas City: Cook Paint Company, Kansas City
Holt, Peterson, Ekstrom, Gordon, Mosley (Capt.), Lecrone, Wingate, DeBernardi.
1929, Convention Hall, Kansas City: Cook Paint Company, Kansas City
De Bernadi, Burke, Hewitt, Peterson, Holt, Harrigan, Hale, Gordon, Lamb.
1930, Convention Hall, Kansas City: Henry Clothiers, Wichita, Kansas
McBurney, Starbock, Gibbons, Hewitt, Miller, Davis, Dundham, Nonken, Burke.
1931, Convention Hall, Kansas City: Henry Clothiers, Wichita, Kansas
Davis, Callahan, Dunham, Scott, Miller, Iba, McBurney, Hoffman, Alexander, Gardner (Capt).
1932, Convention Hall, Kansas City: Henry Clothiers, Wichita, Kansas
Miller, Gibbons, Grove, Pickell, Olmstead, Dunham, Calahan.
1933, Convention Hall, Kansas City: Diamond DX Oilers, Tulsa, Oklahoma
Chuck Hyatt, Futhey, Jerome, C. Larson, Lantrop, Carlton, H. Larson, Mullins, Art Hyatt.
1934, Convention Hall, Kansas City: Diamond DX Oilers, Tulsa, Oklahoma
W. Miller, Willis, Lantrop, Carlton (Capt), Larson, Pickell, Mullins, Hyatt.
1935, Convention Hall, Kansas City: Southern Kansas Stage Lines
Fischer, Browning, Piper, Quinn, Wier, Wallenstrom, Praiswater, Meyers, Light.
1936, Convention Hall, Kansas City: Globe Refiners, McPherson, Kansas
Johnson, Ragland, Frank, Gibbons, Wheatley, Vaughan, Dowd, Fortenbury, Schmidt.

=== 1937–1956: Denver Rise ===
1937, Denver Auditorium Arena, Denver, Colorado: Denver Safeways, Denver, Colorado –
Shelton (Capt). Mansweller, Frank, Young, Gruenig, Colvin, Dowell, McCracken, Bauer, Fee.
1938, Denver Auditorium Arena, Denver, Colorado: Healey Motors, Kansas City
Herman Fischer, Francis Johnson, Bud Beiser, Roy Brown, Fred Pralle, Ray Noble, Dick Staab, Frank Groves, Bob Weir.
1939, Denver Auditorium Arena, Denver, Colorado: Denver Nuggets, Denver, Colorado
Bill Ogle, Pete Lentry, Bob Gruenig, Dick Wells, Ted Connelly, Werner Frank, Ralph Bishop, Jack McCracken, Tex Colvin.
1940, Denver Auditorium Arena, Denver, Colorado: Phillips 66, Bartlesville, Oklahoma
1941, Denver Auditorium Arena, Denver, Colorado: Twentieth Century Foz, Hollywood, Carlifornia
Cloyd, Woodward, Weldie, Johnson, Harris, O'Hara, Knowels, Lubin, McGrath, Mollner, Schiefer.
Tucker, Pralle, Ebling, Loackard, Martin Hyatt (Amateur Coach), Lewis, Fortenbury, Trowtwein, Grove, Shields.
1942, Denver Auditorium Arena, Denver, Colorado: American Legion, Denver, Colorado
Strannigan, Harvey, McCracken, Marsh, Marks, Gray, Unger, Lentz, Bob Gruenig.
1943, Denver Auditorium Arena, Denver, Colorado: Phillips 66, Bartlesville, Oklahoma
McNatt, Browning, Freiberger, Pralle, Carpenter, Rothman, Nash, Yates.
1944, Denver Auditorium Arena, Denver, Colorado: Phillips, 66, Bartlesville, Oklahoma
McNatt, Browning, Tucker, Carpenter, Freiberger, Clar, Pralle, Rothman.
1949, Denver Auditorium Arena, Denver, Colorado: Oakland Bittners
Reimke, Williams, Voss, O'Gara, Barksdale, Fisher, Hanger, Fasholz, Silver, Minor.
1948, Denver Auditorium Arena, Denver, Colorado: Phillips 66, Bartlesville, Oklahoma
Beck, Nash, Reneck, Reich, Bob Kurland, Tucker, Carpenter, Beisser, Pitts, Jones.
1947, Denver Auditorium Arena, Denver, Colorado: Phillips 66, Bartlesville, Oklahoma
Carpenter, Martin, Stockman, Nash, Eggleston, Perrault, Reneck, Bob Kurland.
1946', Denver Auditorium Arena, Denver, Colorado: Phillips 66, Bartlesville, Oklahoma
Mcnatt, Nash, Carpenter, Martin, Renick, Rothman, Lewis, Reisser.
1945, Denver Auditorium Arena, Denver, Colorado: Phillips 66, Bartlesville, Oklahoma
Nash, Rothman, McNatt, Browning, Linderman, Halbert, Carpenter, Yates, Schwartzer.
1954, Denver Auditorium Arena, Denver, Colorado: Peoria Cats
Retherford, Minter, McCabe, Ron Bontemps, Gladson, Penwell, Sheets, Solomon.
1953, Denver Auditorium Arena, Denver, Colorado: Peoria Cats
Ron Bontemps, Freiberger, McCabe, Pippin, Williams, Retherford, Minter, Penwell, Dean, Haarlow.
1952, Denver Auditorium Arena, Denver, Colorado: Peoria Caterpillar Diesels
Ron Bontemps, Freiberger, McCabe, Pippin, Williams, Lafferty, Schmidt, Dempsey.
1951, Denver Auditorium Arena, Denver, Colorado: Stewart Chevrolet, San Francisco, California
Walker, Yardley, Hendricksen, Crandall, Kuzara, Payne, Greenback, Laney, Bullwinkel.
1950, Denver Auditorium Arena, Denver, Colorado: Phillips 66, Bartlesville, Oklahoma
Beck, Lipscomb, Bennett, Stanich, Courtney, Bob Kurland, Williams, Tucker, Reich, Pryor.

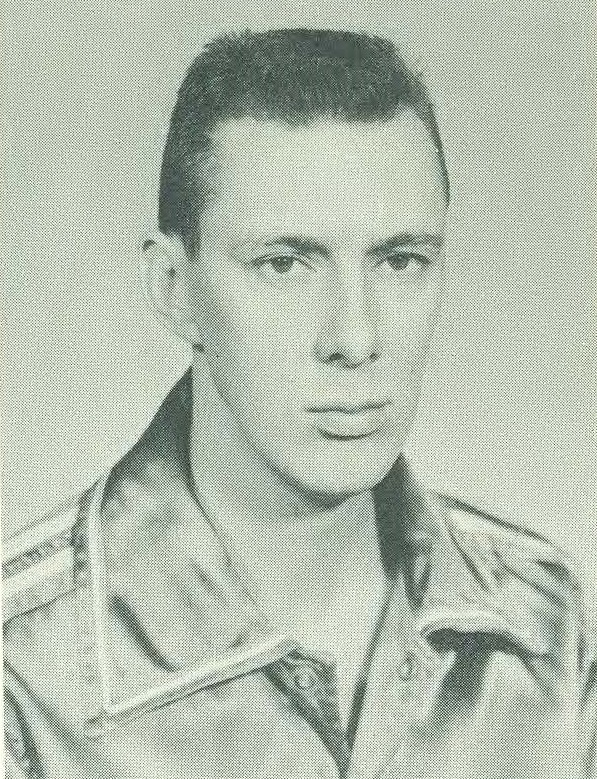
Burdette Haldorson, a champion with the Oilers in the 1950s

=== 1957–1968: Denver Fall ===
1955, Denver Auditorium Arena, Denver, Colorado: Phillips 66, Bartlesville, Oklahoma
Walsh, Short, Darling, Ford, Houghland, Fuller, Mattick, Buchanan, Rivers.
1956, Denver Auditorium Arena, Denver, Colorado: Buchan Bakers, Seattle, Washington
Parsons, Halberg, Jordan, Swyers, Glowaski, Guisness, B. H. Born, Cipriano, Koon.
1957, Denver Auditorium Arena, Denver, Colorado: U.S. Air Force
Dick Boushka, Don Bragg, Shag Warren, Ron Tomsic, Dick Welsh, Jim Coshow, Max Hooper, Allen Kelley, Mac McDonald, Eddie White.
1958, Denver Auditorium Arena, Denver, Colorado: Peoria Cats
Bingham, Palmer, B. H. Born, Prudhoe, Plunkett, Schultz, Sullivan, Warden, Lee, Wolfe, A. Kelley, Crittenden, D. Kelley.
1959, Denver Auditorium Arena, Denver, Colorado: Wichita Vickers
Boushka, Swartz, Boldebuck, Lane, Revon, Smith, King, Schramm, Mullen.
1960, Denver Auditorium Arena, Denver, Colorado: Peoria Cats
Boozer, Adams, Prudhoe, Ohi, Crittenden, Plunkett, Kelley, Hill, Woll.
1961, Denver Auditorium Arena, Denver, Colorado: Cleveland Pipers, Cleveland
Adams, Swartz, Sharrar, Taylor, Barnhill, McCollom, Hamilton.
1962, Denver Auditorium Arena, Denver, Colorado: Phillips 66
Hagan, Robitallie, Frank, McNeil, Kojis, Thompson, Altenberg, Cole, Bowerman, Jerry Shipp, Price.
1963, Denver Auditorium Arena, Denver, Colorado: Phillips 66
Kojis, Jerry Shipp, Hagan, Price, Rascoe, Bowerman, Moran, Frank, Mounts, Pursiful.
1964, Denver Auditorium Arena, Denver, Colorado: Goodyear Wingfoots
Arnold, Beckman, Larry Brown (MVP), Davies, McCaffrey, McCoy, Sharrar, Small, Whiteford, Williams.
1965, Denver Auditorium Arena, Denver, Colorado: Armed Forces All Stars
Sheehan, Meyers, Birkle, Reloff, Connelly, USMC; Fowler, Mahonak, Reid, Vern Benson (MVP), USA; Stowers, USAF; Moor, USN.
1966, Denver Auditorium Arena, Denver, Colorado: Ford Mustangs
Russell (MVP), Clawson, Johnson, Olson, Darden, Curtis, Murrey, Thompson, Tregoning, Washington.
1967, Denver Auditorium Arena, Denver, Colorado: Akron Goodyear
Miller, Jim King, Anderson, Calvin Fowler, Vern Benson, Patterson, McCoy, Corell, Dabich, Hanson.
1968, Denver Auditorium Arena, Denver, Colorado: Armed Forces All Stars
Coach Hal Fisher, USA; S/Sgt. Jones, Manager, USAF: Darius Cunningham, John Clawson, George Carter, Mike Silliman, USA; Mike Redd, Marvin Willet, USMC; John Snipes, James Cole, USN; Mike Barrett (MVP), USN; Ken Bradley, Harry Gilmore, Bill Blair, USAF.

1969-1970: at Macon and Columbia
1969, Macon, Georgia: Armed Forces All Stars
Coach Hal Fisher, USA; Garfield Smith, Ken Washington, Rod McDonald, Mike Silliman, George Collier, Tal Brody, Harold Jeter, Bob Wolf, USA; Howard Hansen, USN; Mike Redd, Jim Meyers, USMC.
1970, Columbia, South Carolina: Armed Forces All Stars
Coach Hal Fisher, USA; Mike Redd, USMC; Mike Sillman, Garfield Smith, Tal Brody, Mike Wolf, Rod MacDonald, Ken Washington, Art Wilmore, Darnell Hillman, USA; Ed Whitehead, USAF.

1971-1973: at Kentucky
1971, London Kentucky: Armed Forces All Stars
Art Wilmore, Don Crenshaw, Bruce Sloan, Darnell Hillman, Jim Oxley, Fram Dumphy, Ron Krayl, Larry Bauer, USA; Chuck Kozak, USMC; Cliff Parsons, USAF; Hal Fisher, Coach, USA, Assistant Mike Krzyzewski, Jim Fox, USA.
1972, London Kentucky: Armed Forces All Stars
Bernie Barnes, Howard Hughes, Cliff Parsons, Ron Richards, Marv Schmitt, Gregg Popovich, USAF; Bill Squires, USMC; Paul Andrews, Don Crenshaw, Tom Daley, USA.
1973, Ashland, Kentucky: Marathon Oil, Lexington, Kentucky
Coaches ScottBaesler, Pat Doyle; Kenny Davis, Jim Lemaster, George Bryant, John Adams, Gene Kirk, Jim Day, Dan Argabright, Ketchel Strauss, Phil Argento, Darryl Dunagan.

=== 1974–1976: AAU Fall ===
1974-1976: at Baton Rouge
1974, F. G. Clark Center, Baton Rouge, Louisiana: Jacksonville, Florida
Coach Lowell Wood; Dan Foster, Rick Coleman, Chip Dublin, Otis Cole, Todd Lolich, Otis Johnson, Lawrence McCray, Abe Steward, Rex Morgan.
1975, F. G. Clark Center, Baton Rouge, Louisiana: Capital Insulation, Los Angeles, California
Louis Smith, Dwight Taylor, Paul Scranton, Larry Hollifield, Billy Jackson, Carl Toney, Richard Darnall, Hugh Fenderson, William Jankans, Robert Murray.
1976, F. G. Clark Center, Baton Rouge, Louisiana: Athletes in Action, Tustin, California – at
Charles Neal, Brad Hoffman, Eldon Lawyer, Randy Allen, David Lower, Doug Oxsen, Irvin Kiffin, Tim Hall, Dan Knight, John Sears.

=== 1985–1998: at Topeka, Kansas ===
1985, Topeka, Kansas: Brewster Heights Packing, Brewster, Washington
Coach John J. Pariseau, Assistant Coach Keith Kingsbury, Sponsor Ed Pariseau, Managers, Mike Pariseau, Mark Pariseau; Eddie Smith, Pete Williams, Brian Kellerman, Jay Triano, John W. Pariseau, Eli Pasquale, Phil Zevenbergen, Mike Terpstra, Eric Brewe, Ray Brooks.
1986, Topeka, Kansas: Continental/Coors, Houston, Texas
Coach Marty Bratton; Jimmy Gilbert, Greg Anderson, Nick Cucinella, Ron Baxter, Andrew Parker, Ernest Patterson, Alvin Franklin, Kevin Fitchett, Vick Ewing, Steve Sylestine, Harry O'Brian, Greg Skulman.
1987, Topeka, Kansas: Brewster Heights Packing, Brewster, Washington
Coach John J. Pariseau, Assistant Coach Keith Kingsbury, Sponsor Ed Pariseau; John W. Pariseau, Alvin Vaughn, Lorenzo Romar, Jay Triano, Zack Jones, Todd Burton, Phil Zevenbergen, Tom Gneiting, Eddie Smith, Sven Meyers, Ron Vanderschaaf.
1988, Topeka, Kansas: Brewster Heights Packing, Brewster, Washington
Coach John J. Pariseau, Assistant Coach Keith Kingsbury, Sponsor Ed Pariseau; John W. Pariseau, Brian Kellerman, Lorenzo Romar, Phil Hopson, Jay Triano, Dan Weiss, Ricky Brown, Zak Jones, Al Kristmanson, Kevin Sprewer.
1989, Topeka, Kansas: US Armed Forces – at Topeka, Kansas
Coaches Harold Johnson and Bill Carry; Earl Wilson, Kevin Houston, Timothy Wilson, Samural Addison, Kevin Bradshaw, Dion Brown, Raymond Lettstom, K.E. Whittaker, Walter Golden, Willie Linder, Charles Bailey, David Robinson.
1990, Topeka, Kansas: Sam Ragnone, Attorney – Flint, Michigan – at Topeka, Kansas
Coach Sam Ragnone; Joel Ragland, Lamar Edwards, Darrin Fitzgerald, Tom Hawkins, Terry Duerod, Eric Turner, Ray Keiser, Greg Kelser, Lorenzo Orr, Zack Hicks, Rony Thompkins, Ernest Williams.
1991, Topeka, Kansas: Lafayette Hustlers – Lafayette, Indiana
Coach Jim Bower, Ryan Berning, Ricky Hall, Derrick Johnson, Kip Jones, Walter Jordan, John Teague, Shawn Teague, Chad Tucker, Tim Hasley, T. Cutter.
1992, Topeka, Kansas: Sam Ragnone Attorney – Flint, Michigan
Coach Sam Ragnone, Darrin Fitzgerald, Lamar Edwards, Eric Turner, Terry Duerod (MVP), Gilvannie Johnson, Jones, Phil Hubbard, Greg Kelser.
1993, Topeka, Kansas: USA Verich Reps – Warren, Ohio
Coach Louis Cathcart, Derrick Fields, Mergin Sina, Darrin Morningstar, Bill Edwards, Johnny McDole, Louis Geter, Trig Lee, Dapris Owens, Harris, Craig, Hodges.
1994, Topeka, Kansas: MNS Stars – Kansas City, Missouri
Coach Milton R. Bradley, Nate Buntin, Stan Bradley, Aaron Collier, Michael Irvin, Will Scott, Jamal Coleman, Deryl Kearney, Deryl Conningham, Stan Bradley, Jay Boster, Cody, Waters.
1995, Topeka, Kansas: Team Pella – Des Moines, Iowa
Michael Born, Ron Bayless, Brad Pippett, Howard Eaton, Sam Powell, Fred Brown, Paul Doerrfeld.
1996, Topeka, Kansas: Bankers and Investors-Kansas City, Missouri
Coach Riley Maher, Burce Chubick, Eugene Cheadle, Rick Muller, Brian Maher, Dion Barnes, Tom Wald, Ralph Davis, Mac Irvin, Terrance Badgett, Erwin Claggett, Chris Haynes.
1997, Topeka, Kansas: Marathon Basketball – Joliette, Illinois
Coach Mark Simpson, Curt Smith, Erwin Claggett, Willie Murdaugh, Jerald Ryner, Jeff Harris, Steve Showalter, Rick Hughes, Mikki Moore.
1998, Topeka, Kansas: Pella Windows – Des Moines, IA
Coach Michael J. Born, Michael Born, Ron Bayless, Carl Pickett, Brad Pippett, Troy Wade, Tony Harvey, Jeff Hrubes.

1977, Lake Worth, Florida: Armed Forces All Stars
Coach Hal Fisher, Assistant Wilbert Logan; Jyrona Ralston, Robert Sherwin, Eddie Brown, Pierre Russell, James Penn, George Hester, Jerome Benning, Ron Brown, Bobby Young, Richard McGuire, Alfred Forney, L.C. Pierce.
1978, at London, Kentucky: Christian Youth Center, Joliet Illinois
Coach Glen Sergent; Tim Bryant, Dennis Taylor, Steve Clum, Jim Bocinski, Huby Marshall, Jim Calhoun, Frank Kaminsky, Houston Lloyd, Bill Glover.
1979, Ponca City, Oklahoma: Christian Youth Center, Joliet, Illinois
Coach Glen Sergent; Allan Hardy (MVP), Dennis Taylor, Steve Clum, Jim Bocinski, Huby Marshall, Kerry Hughes, Frank Kaminsky, Craig Burtyn, Bill Glover.

1979 and 1980: at Florida
1980, St. Augustine, Florida: Airliner Basketball Club, Iowa City, Iowa
Coach Jim Baker, Assistant Dante Vignaroli, Sponsor Doug Tvedt; Fred Haberecht, Mike Gatens, Neil Fegebank, Glenn Vicnovic, William Mayfield, Clay Hargrave, Rick Engel, Pete Griffin, Tom Norma, Dick Peth, John Hairston, Gary DeCarlo.
1981, St. Augustine, Florida: Brewster-Heights Packing, Brewster, Washington
Coach John J. Pariseau, Assistant Keith Kingsbury, Sponsor Ed Pariseau; Joe Leonard, Mark Scott, Marion Pericin, Tony Barnes, Stan Walker, Todd Burton, Dennis Johnson, Jeff Stoutt, Wayne Smith, Joe Webb.

1982, Portland, Oregon: Brewster Heights Packing, Brewster, Washington
Coach John J. Pariseau, Assistant Keith Kingsbury, Sponsor Ed Pariseau; Joe Webb, Eric Brewe, Gene Glenn, Dan Caldwell, Todd Burton, Joe Leonard, Steve Matzen, Rob Visser, Ray Orange, Billy Turney Loos, John Greig, John W. Pariseau.
1983, Ponca City, Oklahoma: Houston Flyers, Houston, Texas
Coach Marty Bratton, Assistant Howard Knight, John Flewellen; Latrell Mitchell, Harry O'Brien, Steve Sylestine, Ed Jeffries, Andrew Parker, Ricky Hooker, Randy Martel, Hiram Harrison, David Marrs, Larry Hendrix, Kenny Austin.
1984, Las Vegas, Nevada: Paul-Son Dice, Las Vegas, Nevada
Coach Larry Keever, Manager Mike Pilz, Sponsor Paul-Son Dice and Card, Inc; Terry Manghum, Alan Holder, Melvin Washington, Bobby Joe Jacobs, Cris Jackson, Armon Gilliam, Mel Bennet, Keith Star, Greg Goorjian, Kenny Harmon, Sam Smith.

=== 1999-present ===
1999-2000 at Des Moines
1999, Sisam Arena, Des Moines, Iowa: Palmer's Tornadoes, Des Moines, IA
Coach David Palmer, Sam Crawford, David Palmer, Tim Gill, Lamar Hillsman, Darrel "A.J." Waley, Stan Gouard, Rocky Walls, Wayne Houston, Ed Johnson, Ray Poindexter.
2000, Sisam Arena, Des Moines, Iowa: Palmer's Tornadoes – Des Moines, IA
Coach Stan Gouard, Asst. Coach David Palmer, Wayne Houston (MVP), Kevin Sams, Justin Wimmer, Tim Gill, Lonnie Cooper, Tyrone Barksdale, D. Taylor, Carl Pickett, Ed Johnson, M. Stephany.
2001-2005 at Sacramento
2001, Cosumnes River College, Sacramento, CA: Shell-Widman – Elk Grove, CA
Coach David Shell, Shann Ferch (MVP), Charles Terrell, Ali Thomas, Robert Richardson, Lossie Mitchell, Thomas Washington, Justin Leslie, Jason Cox, Rich Manning, Tito Addison, Jimmie Carol.
2002, Cosumnes River College, Sacramento, CA: Posse – San Jose, CA – at Sacramento, California
Coach Joe Molina, Asst. Coach Al Gordon, Brian Jones (MVP), Wayman Strickland, Champ Wrencher, Darrel Teat, Dave Smith, Chris Samdahl, Steve Ross, Richard Morton, Julius Hicks, Brian Gomez.
2003, Cosumnes River College, Sacramento, CA: Sunny's Rebels – Seattle, WA
Coach Sunny Backlund, Antuan Jones (MVP), Jackie Jones, Chuck Johnson, Donald Watts, Brian Dennis, Darnell Taylor, Chris Walcott
2004, Cosumnes River College, Sacramento, CA: Maine Lobsters, Bangor, Maine
Coach Charlie Wilson, Fred Hooks (MVP), Demarius Akins, Moses Alvarez, Ed Fontaine,
William Genung, Shaun Jackson, Fred Nichols, Rico Redd, TK Reed, Alton "Sonny" Smith, Shannon Taylor, Al Williams
2005, Cosumnes River College, Sacramento, CA: Mitchell-McKineyz "New Beginnings 4 Youth," Columbus, Ohio
Coach Tony Rice, Tony Rice (MVP), Larry Abney, Ben Berry, Tony Givens, Isaac Jefferson, John
Spain, Orenthall Strothers, Shannon Swillis, Chad Younger.
2007: NA
2006: NA
2008, Cocoa Beach, Florida: 102 Jamz, Orlando, Florida
Brian S, Mike S, Mike E (MVP), Jason, Shawn S, T’here, Pete, Dave
2009, Reno, Nevada: Gold Rush, San Francisco, CA
Coach, Rick Lewis: Jovan Harris (MVP), Cardell butler, Xavier McNally, Dean Browne, John Tofi, Johnny Dukes, Reggie Smith, Larry Reggie.

== MVP award ==
Year	MVP	Team	Champion
1954	George Macuga	US Army	Peoria Cats
1955	George Bales	US Marine Cops	Phillips 66ers
1956	Jim Bond	Pasadena Mirror Glaze	Buchan Bakers
1957	Tom Meschery	San Francisco Olympic Club	US Armed Forces All-Stars
1958	Harvey Schmidt	Denver-Chicago Truckers	Peoria Cats
1959	Dick Boushka	Wichita Vickers	Wichita Vickers
1960	Bob Boozer	Peoria Cats	Peoria Cats
1961	Horace Walker	Denver-Chicago Truckers	Cleveland Pipers
1962	Gary Thompson	Phillips 66ers	Phillips 66ers
1963	Don Kojis	Phillips 66ers	Phillips 66ers
1964	Larry Brown	Akron Wingfoots	Akron Wingfoots
1965	Vern Benson	US Armed Forces All-Stars	US Armed Forces All-Stars
1966	Cazzie Russell	Ford Mustangs	Ford Mustangs
1967	Harold Sergent	Phillips 66ers	Akron Wingfoots
1968	Mike Barrett	US Armed Forces (Navy)	US Armed Forces All-Stars
1969	Garfield Smith	US Armed Forces (Army)	US Armed Forces All-Stars
1970	Mike Silliman	US Armed Forces (Navy)	US Armed Forces All-Stars
1971	Darnell Hillman	US Armed Forces (Navy)	US Armed Forces All-Stars
1972	Richard Harris	Marion-Kay	US Armed Forces All-Stars

== Notable teams ==
- Phillips 66ers
- Akron Wingfoots
- Denver Nuggets
- Peoria Cats
- US Armed Forces All-Stars
- Buchan Bakers
- Cleveland Pipers
- Kansas City Athletic Club
- Oakland Bittners
- Houston Flyers

== AAU players who became NBA All-Stars ==
- Dick Barnett (Cleveland Pipers)
- Bob Boozer (Peoria Caterpillars)
- Vince Boryla (Denver Nuggets)
- Richie Guerin (Quantico Marines)
- Don Kojis (Phillips 66ers)
- Clyde Lee (Knoxville Contac Caps)
- Clyde Lovellette (Phillips 66ers)
- Tom Meschery (San Francisco Olympic Club)
- Don Ohl (Peoria Cats)
- Jim Pollard (San Diego Dons, Oakland Bittners)
- Flynn Robinson (Denver Capital)
- Bob Rule (Denver Capital)
- Cazzie Russell (Detroit Ford Mustangs)
- Ken Sears (San Francisco Olympic Club)
- George Yardley (San Francisco Stewart Chevrolets, Los Alamitos Naval Air Station)

== Trial Games ==
The AAU also sent teams to the Olympic Trial Games organized before each Olympic tournament. The results of the teams would finally decide the players would play for the USA Team in the Olympics. The playoffs had a massive interest drawing huge crowds to the hosting venues.
Similar games were organized for the FIBA World Cups.

=== Olympic Trials ===
1936: Universal Pictures – McPherson Globe Refiners 44–43
1948: Phillips 66ers – Kentucky Wildcats 53–49
1952: Peoria Caterpillars – Kansas University Jayhawks 62–60
1956: Phillips 66ers

=== Pan American Games Trial ===
1959: NCAA All-Stars (3–0) – Phillips 66ers (2–1)

=== Pan-American Exposition ===
1901: Buffalo Germans

=== FIBA World Cup Trial ===
1950: Denver Chevrolets
1954: Peoria Caterpillars
