= List of Canisius Golden Griffins men's basketball head coaches =

Reggie Witherspoon, the current head coach of the Canisius Golden Griffins.

The following is a list of Canisius Golden Griffins men's basketball head coaches. There have been 24 head coaches of the Golden Griffins in their 117-season history.

Canisius' current head coach is Reggie Witherspoon. He was hired as the Golden Griffins' head coach in May 2016, replacing Jim Baron, who retired after the 2015–16 season.

No.	Tenure	Coach	Years	Record	Pct.
1	1903–1905; 1906–1907	J. P. Quinlisk	3	25–10	.714
2	1905–1906	John Schmitt	1	10–7	.588
3	1907–1909	John Mahoney	2	9–5	.643
4	1909–1911; 1912–1913; 1914–1915	Charles McCabe	4	40–13	.755
–	1911–1912; 1913–1914; 1915–1916	No record	3	15–11	.577
5	1916–1918	Raymond McDonald	2	14–1	.933
6	1919–1920	Edward C. Miller	1	10–4	.714
7	1920–1921	Mike Sweeney	1	5–4	.556
8	1921–1924; 1925–1931	Luke Urban	9	68–49	.581
9	1924–1925; 1931–1933	Russell Burt	3	28–12	.700
10	1933–1944	Allie Seelbach	11	104–83	.556
11	1944–1946	Art Powell	2	20–22	.476
12	1946–1948	Earl Brown	2	24–20	.545
13	1948–1953	Joseph Niland	5	72–53	.576
14	1953–1959	Joseph Curran	6	76–66	.535
15	1959–1972	Bob MacKinnon	13	142–163	.466
16	1972–1974	John Morrison	2	27–23	.540
17	1974–1977	Johnny McCarthy	3	28–49	.364
18	1977–1987	Nick Macarchuk	10	149–128	.538
19	1987–1992	Marty Marbach	5	49–94	.343
20	1992–1997	John Beilein	5	89–62	.589
21	1997–2006	Mike MacDonald	9	108–153	.414
22	2006–2012	Tom Parrotta	6	64–121	.346
23	2012–2016	Jim Baron	4	73–61	.545
24	2016–present	Reggie Witherspoon	7	94–112	.456
Totals		24 coaches	117 seasons	1,343–1,326	.503
Records updated through end of 2022–23 season Source
