= Senator Patrick =

Senator Patrick may refer to:

- Abraham W. Patrick (1829–1909), Ohio State Senate
- Dan Patrick (politician) (born 1950), Texas State Senate
- John Patrick (Maine politician) (born 1954), Maine State Senate
