= 1900 Democratic National Convention =

U.S. political event held in Kansas City, Missouri

- 1900 presidential election
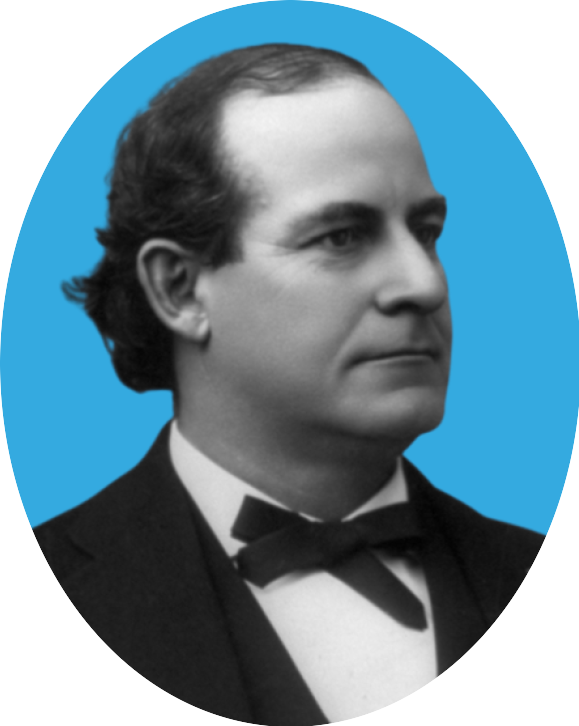
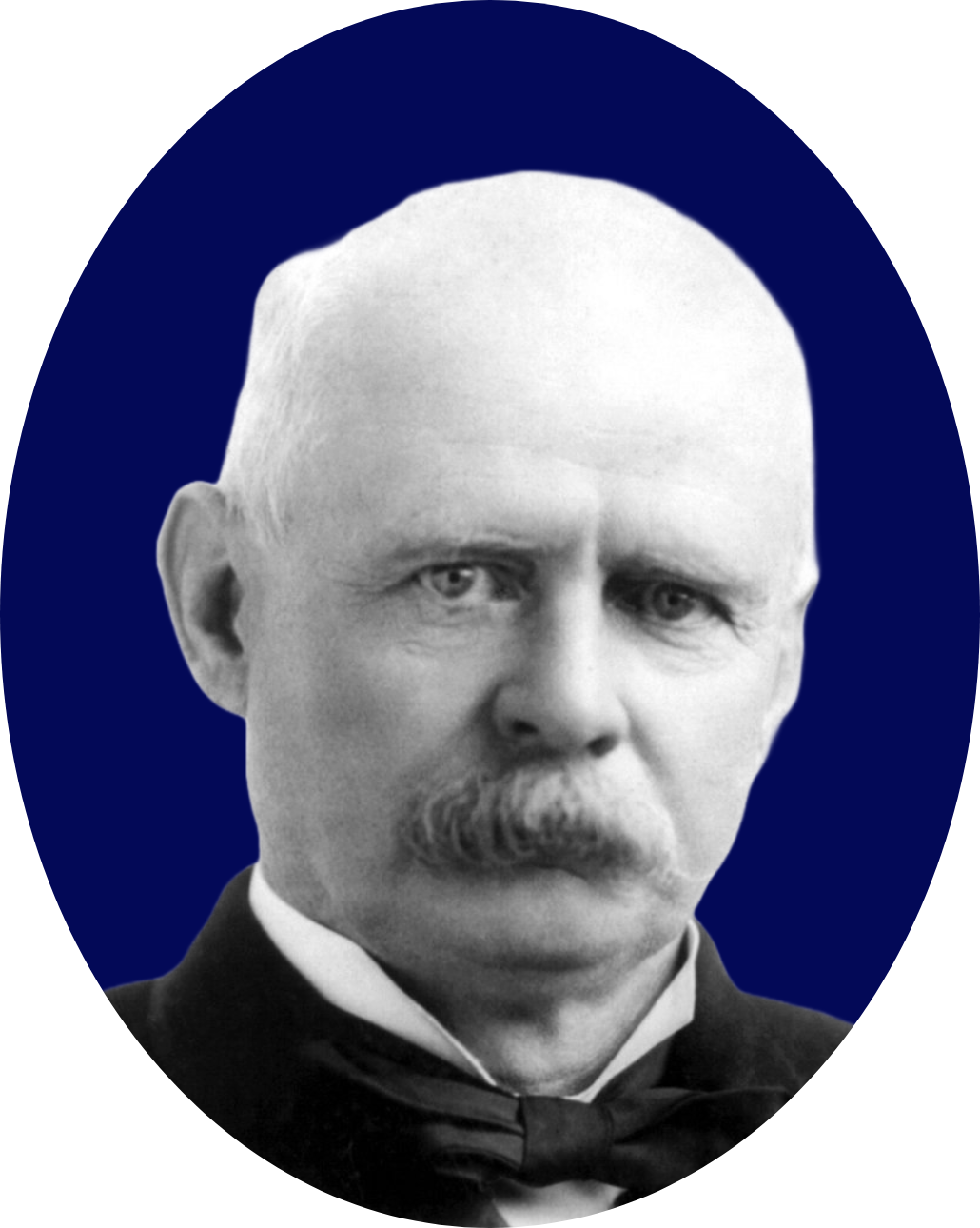
- Nominees; Bryan and Stevenson

Convention
- Date(s): July 4–6, 1900
- City: Kansas City, Missouri
- Venue: Convention Hall

Candidates
- Presidential nominee: William J. Bryan of Nebraska
- Vice-presidential nominee: Adlai E. Stevenson of Illinois

The 1900 Democratic National Convention was a United States presidential nominating convention that took place the week of July 4, 1900, at Convention Hall in Kansas City, Missouri.

The convention nominated William Jennings Bryan for president and former Vice President Adlai E. Stevenson was nominated for vice president. The ticket lost the general election to the Republican ticket of William McKinley and Theodore Roosevelt.

== Presidential nomination ==
=== Presidential candidate ===
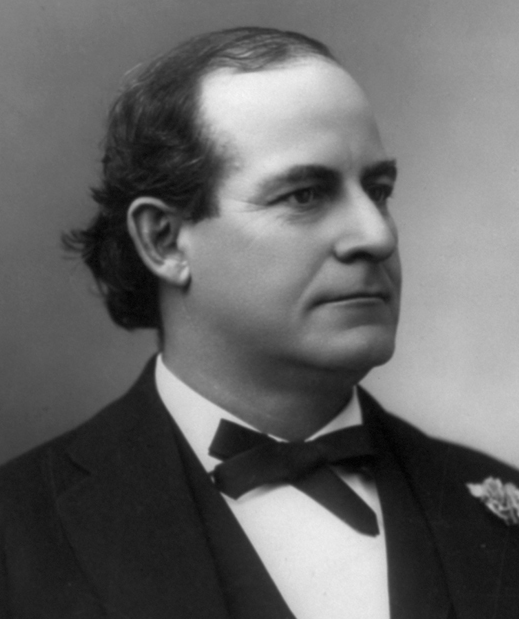
Former Representative William J. Bryan of Nebraska

=== Declined ===
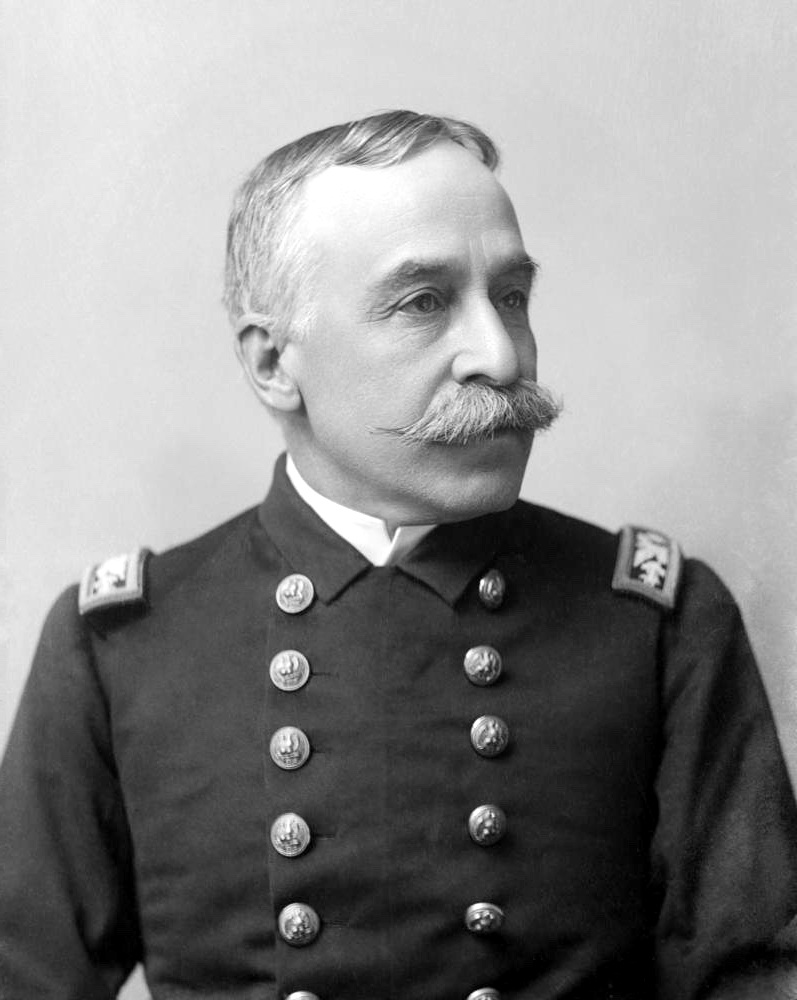
Admiral of the Navy George Dewey of Vermont

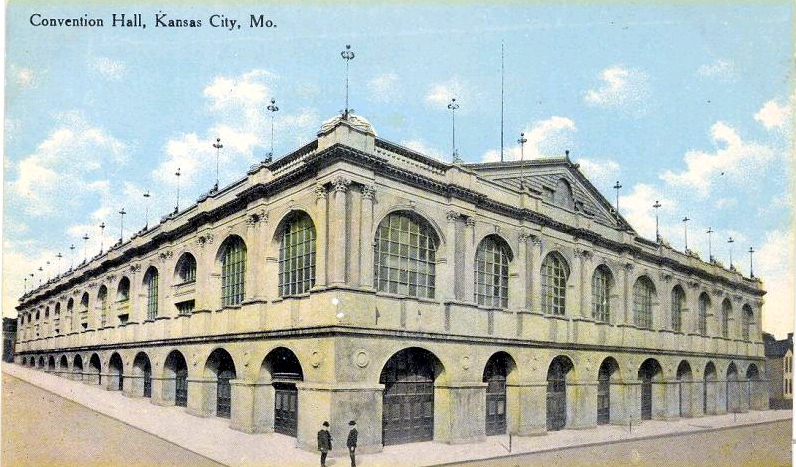
Convention Hall in Kansas City, Missouri

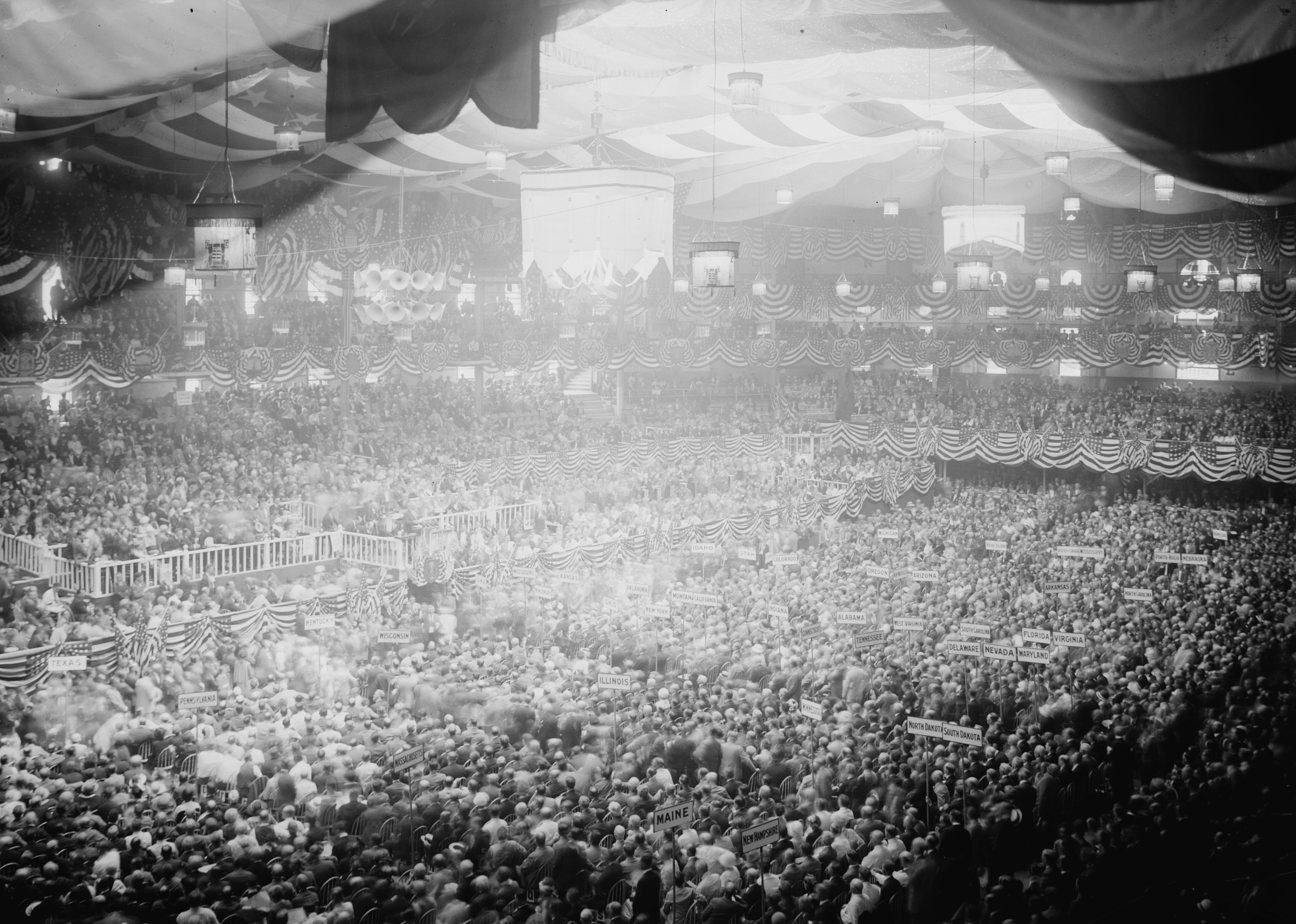
View from the inside

Bryan had little opposition for the nomination after Spanish–American War hero Admiral George Dewey dropped out in May after being quoted in newspapers that he thought the President's job would be easy, because the president merely followed the orders of Congress to enforce laws. Bryan's strongest opposition at the convention came from Richard Croker of New York's Tammany Hall. Bryan was also nominated by a branch of the Populist Party.

The 1900 Democratic National Convention was the first time a woman served as a delegate to a major party convention. Elizabeth M. Cohen of Utah served as a delegate. She had been an alternate delegate, and was able to serve as a delegate after one of the members of her state's delegation fell sick. She seconded the nomination of William Jennings Bryan.

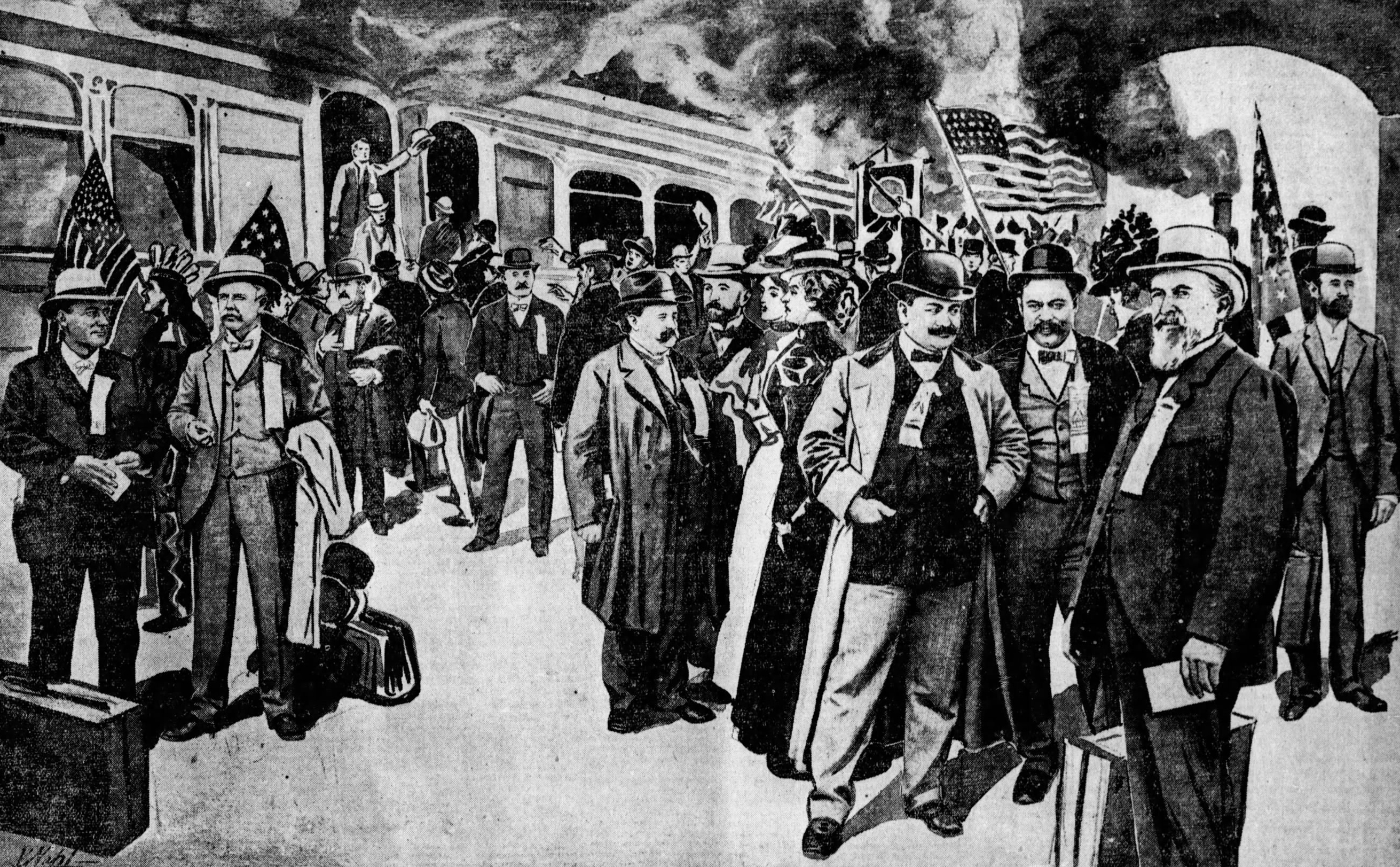
Californian and Hawaiian delegates to the convention as depicted by the San Francisco Examiner, June 30, 1900. In the center are former Congressman James G. Maguire and San Francisco Mayor James D. Phelan; fourth from right is Prince David Kawānanakoa of Hawaii.

The convention marked the first time that a member of royalty attended a U.S. national nominating convention as a delegate. David Kawananakoa, heir to the throne of the Kingdom of Hawaii, represented the newest United States territory. Prince David was to break a tie about inserting a free silver plank into the convention platform. The Democrats included planks in the platform denouncing Republican imperialism and expansion, as had been demonstrated in the Spanish–American War.

Kansas City had the convention thanks to its new Convention Hall, which opened on February 22, 1899. The hall was destroyed in a fire on April 4, 1900, but was rebuilt in 90 days in time for the convention. Harry S. Truman served as a page at the convention.

Presidential Ballot
William Jennings Bryan	936

Source: US President – D Convention. Our Campaigns. (March 10, 2011).

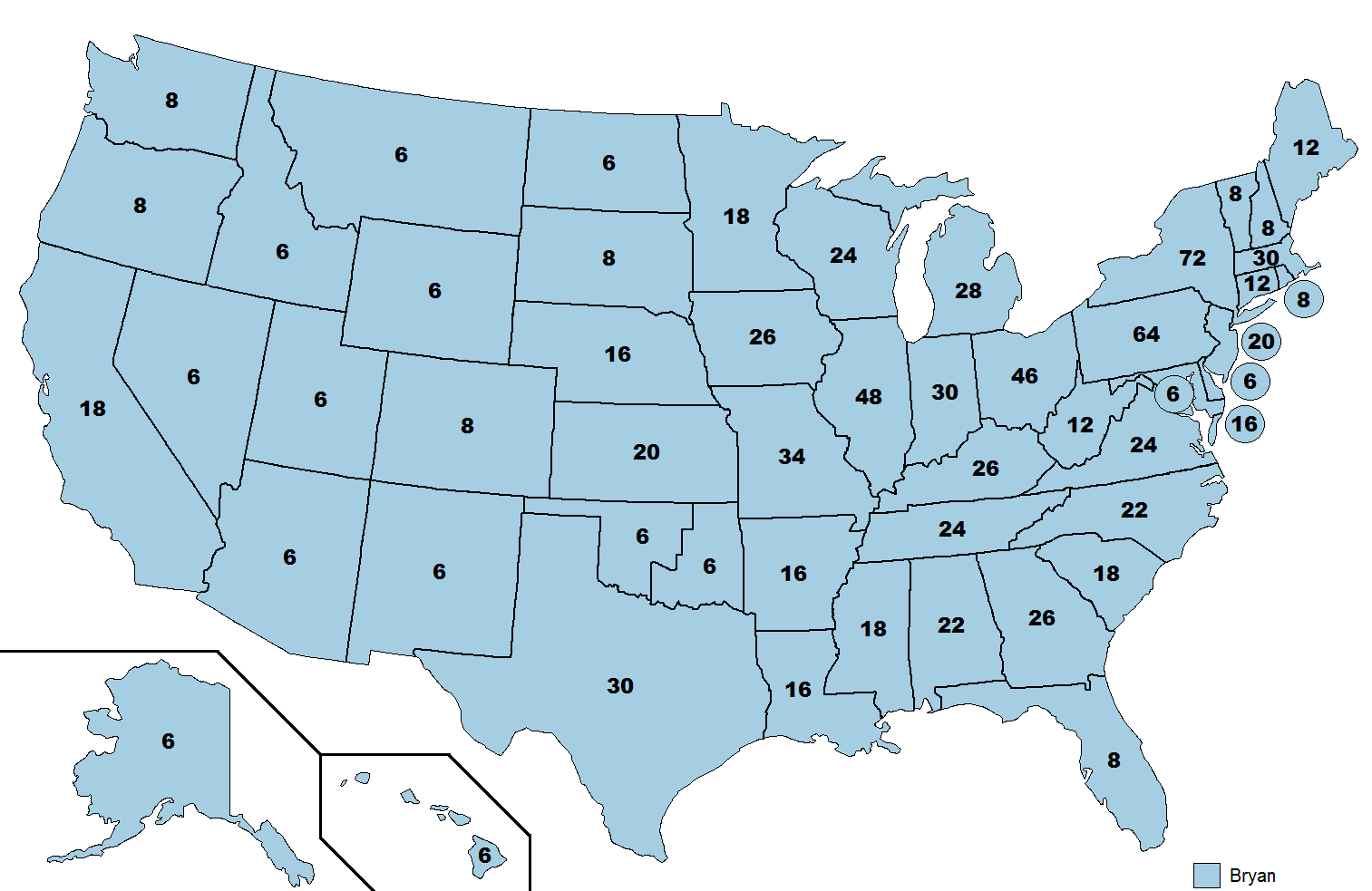
1st Presidential Ballot

== Vice presidential candidates ==
At the start of the convention, former Representative Charles A. Towne of Minnesota was considered the favorite for the vice presidential nomination, as both the Populists and the Silver Republican Party backed Towne. Other names mentioned as possible candidates included former New York Senator David B. Hill, former New York Senator Edward Murphy Jr. and John W. Keller, New York City's Commissioner of Public Charities.

Seven names were placed in nomination: Adlai Stevenson, David B. Hill, Charles A. Towne, Abraham W. Patrick, Julian S. Carr, John W. Smith, and J. Hamilton Lewis. Former Representative Lewis thanked the convention for its generosity but did not wish to be considered for the vice presidency. Governor Smith declined to allow the use of his name, and it was withdrawn before the result was announced. Former Senator Hill was opposed to including a pro-silver plank in the party platform, so he spoke against his own nomination and declared that he would not take it if offered. Former Vice President Stevenson won the nomination with the help of Bryanites who wanted to keep Hill off of the ticket. The choice of Stevenson alienated the Populists and Silver Republicans, who had planned to nominate the Democratic ticket.

=== Vice presidential candidates ===
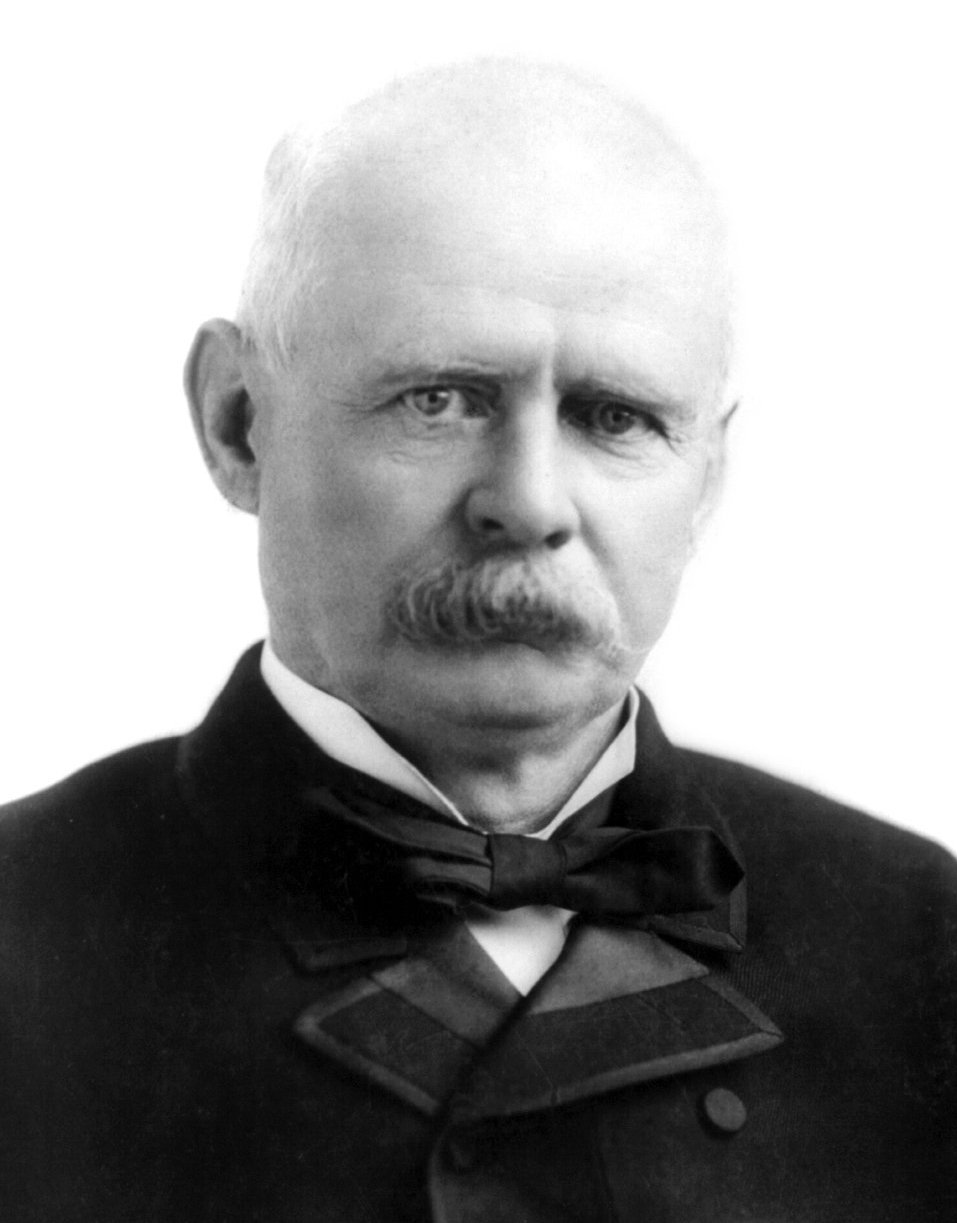
Former Vice President Adlai E. Stevenson from Illinois

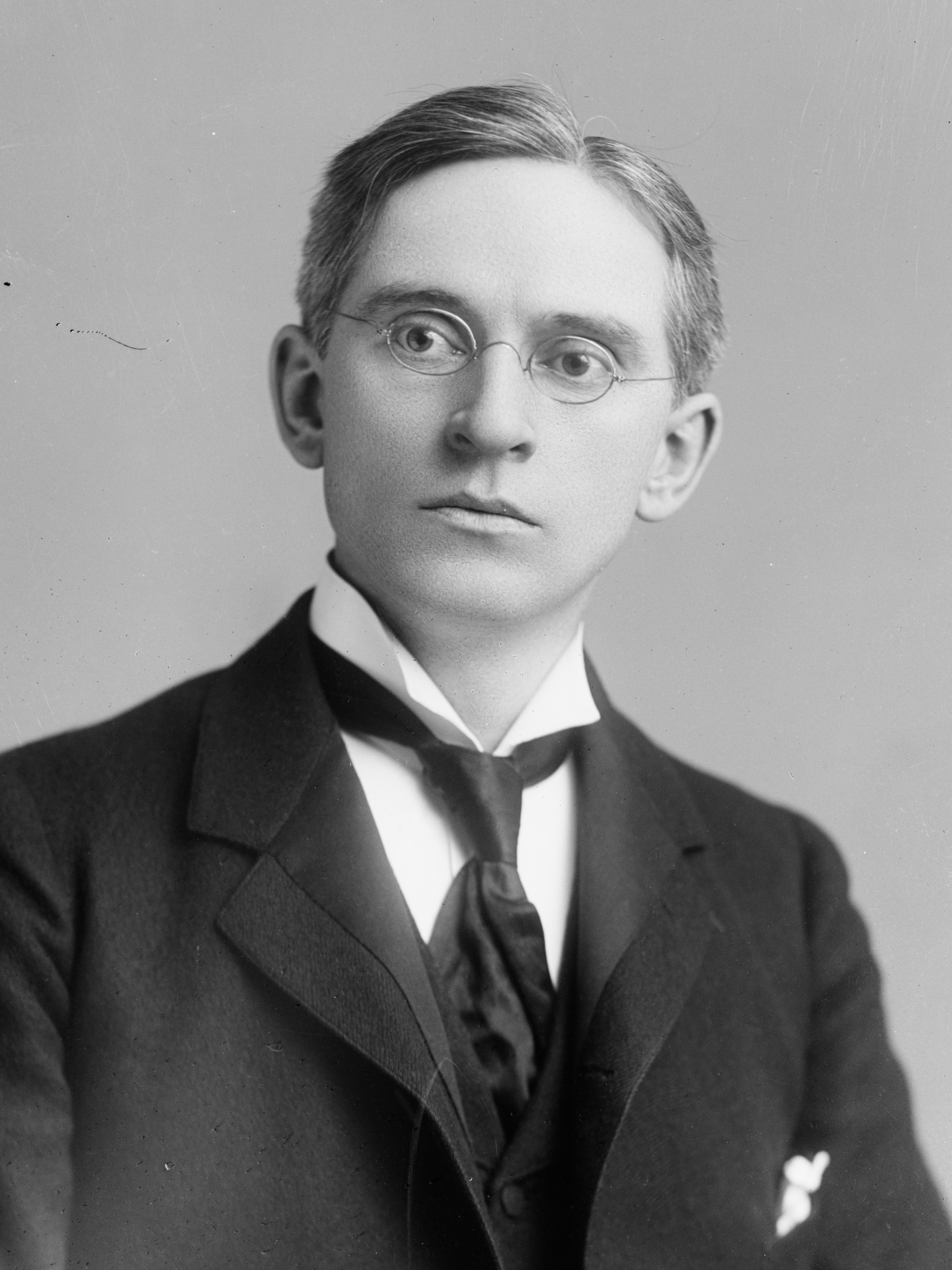
Former Representative Charles A. Towne of Minnesota

Former State Senator Abraham W. Patrick of Ohio

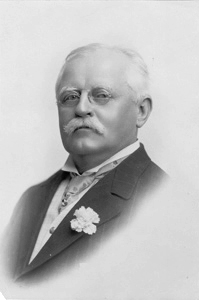
Philanthropist Julian S. Carr of North Carolina (Withdrawn)

=== Declined ===
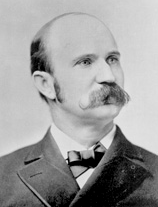
Former Senator David B. Hill of New York

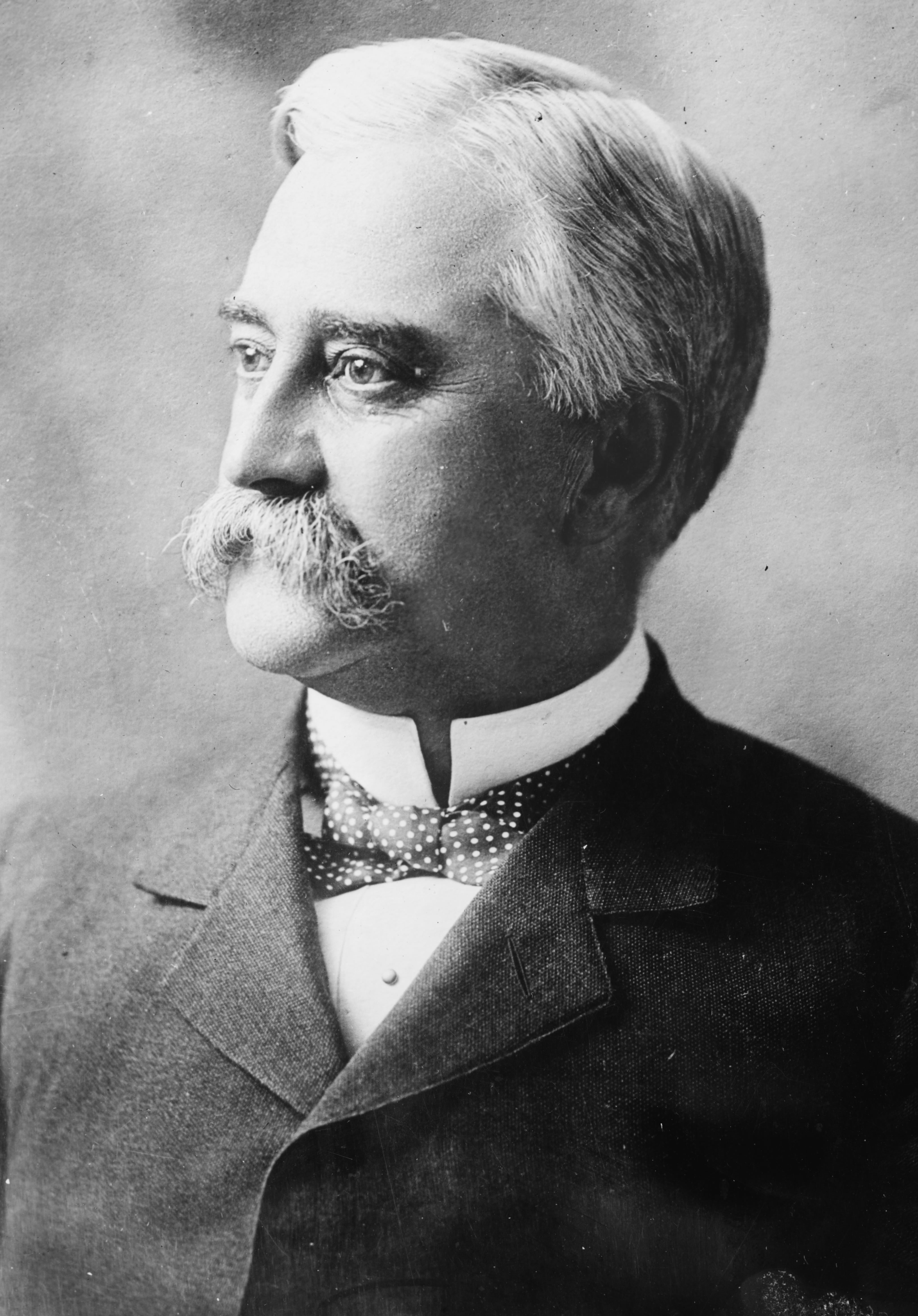
Governor John W. Smith of Maryland

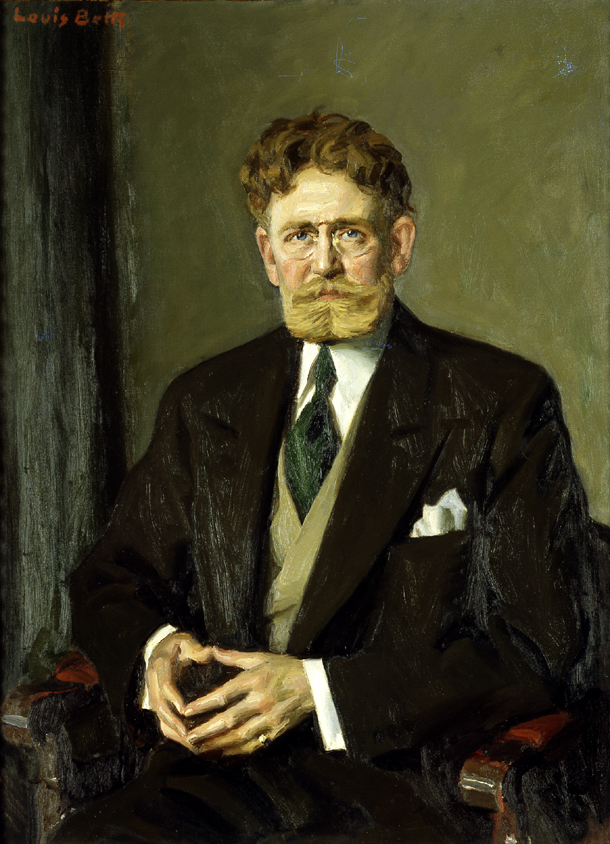
Former Representative J. Hamilton Lewis of Washington

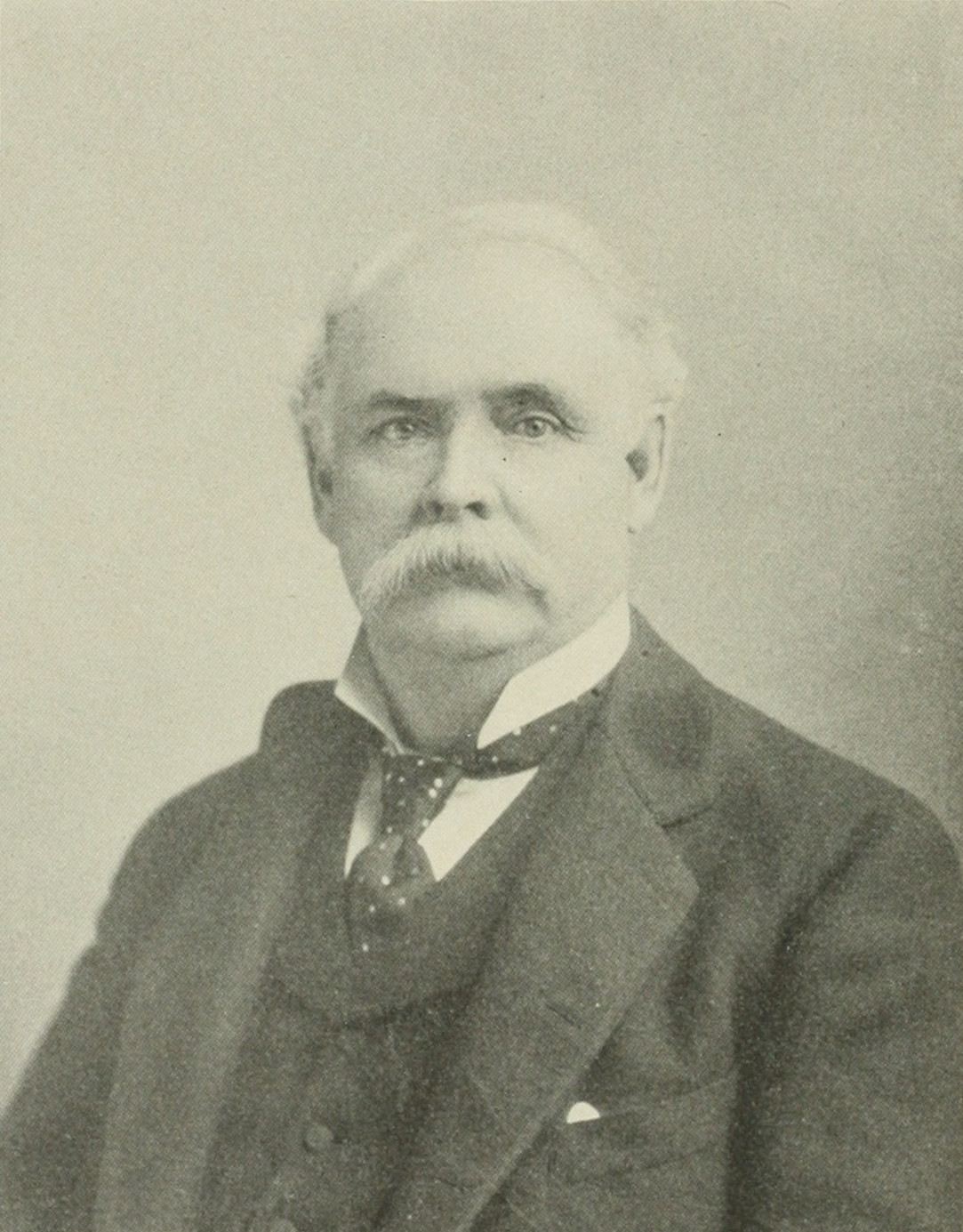
Former Senator Edward Murphy Jr. of New York

Vice Presidential Ballot
	1st (Before Shifts)	1st (After Shifts)
Stevenson	559.5	936
Hill	200	0
Towne	89.5	0
Patrick	46	0
Carr	23	0
Smith	16	0
Danforth	1	0
Hogg	1	0

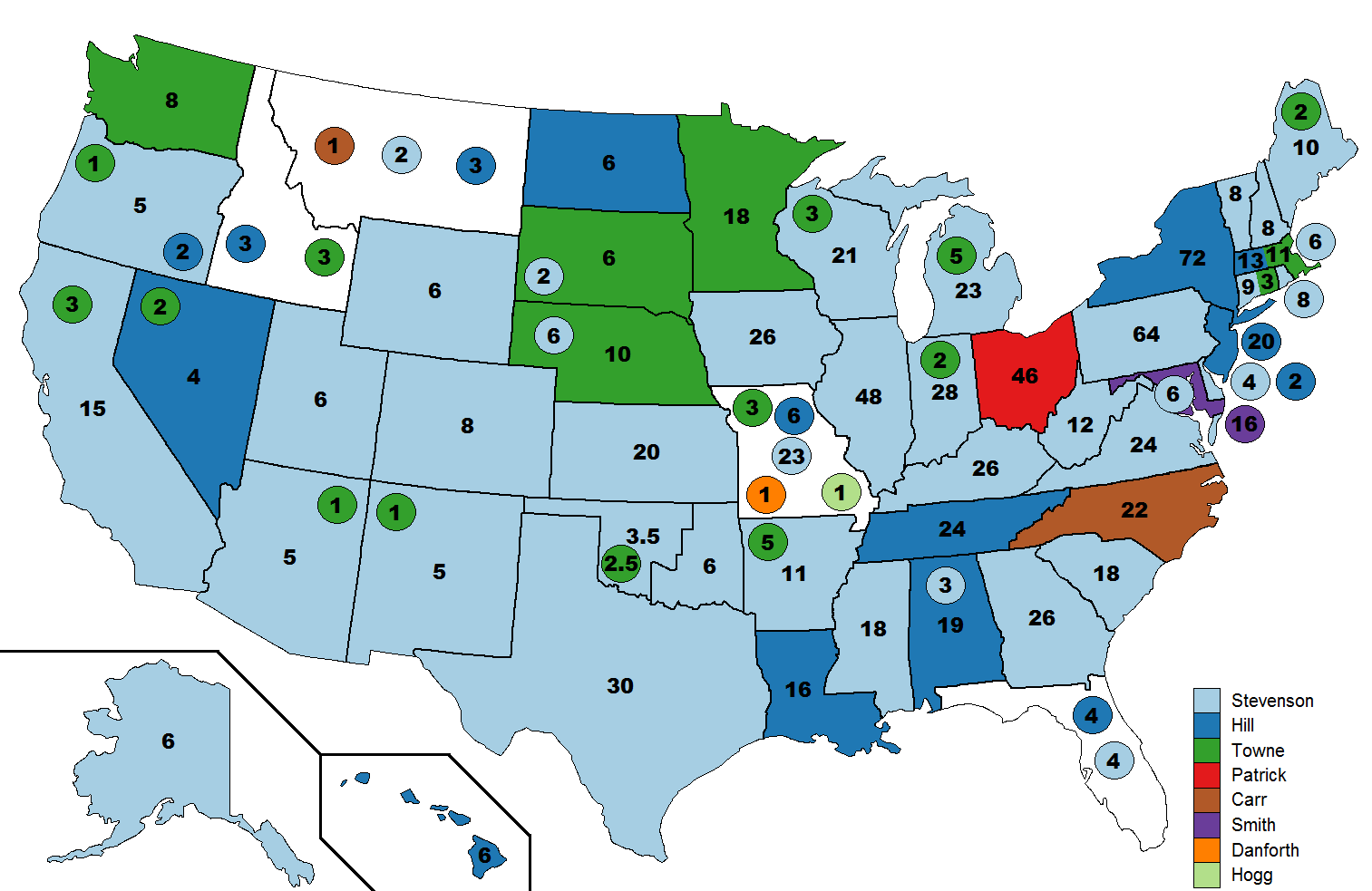
1st Vice Presidential Ballot Before Shifts

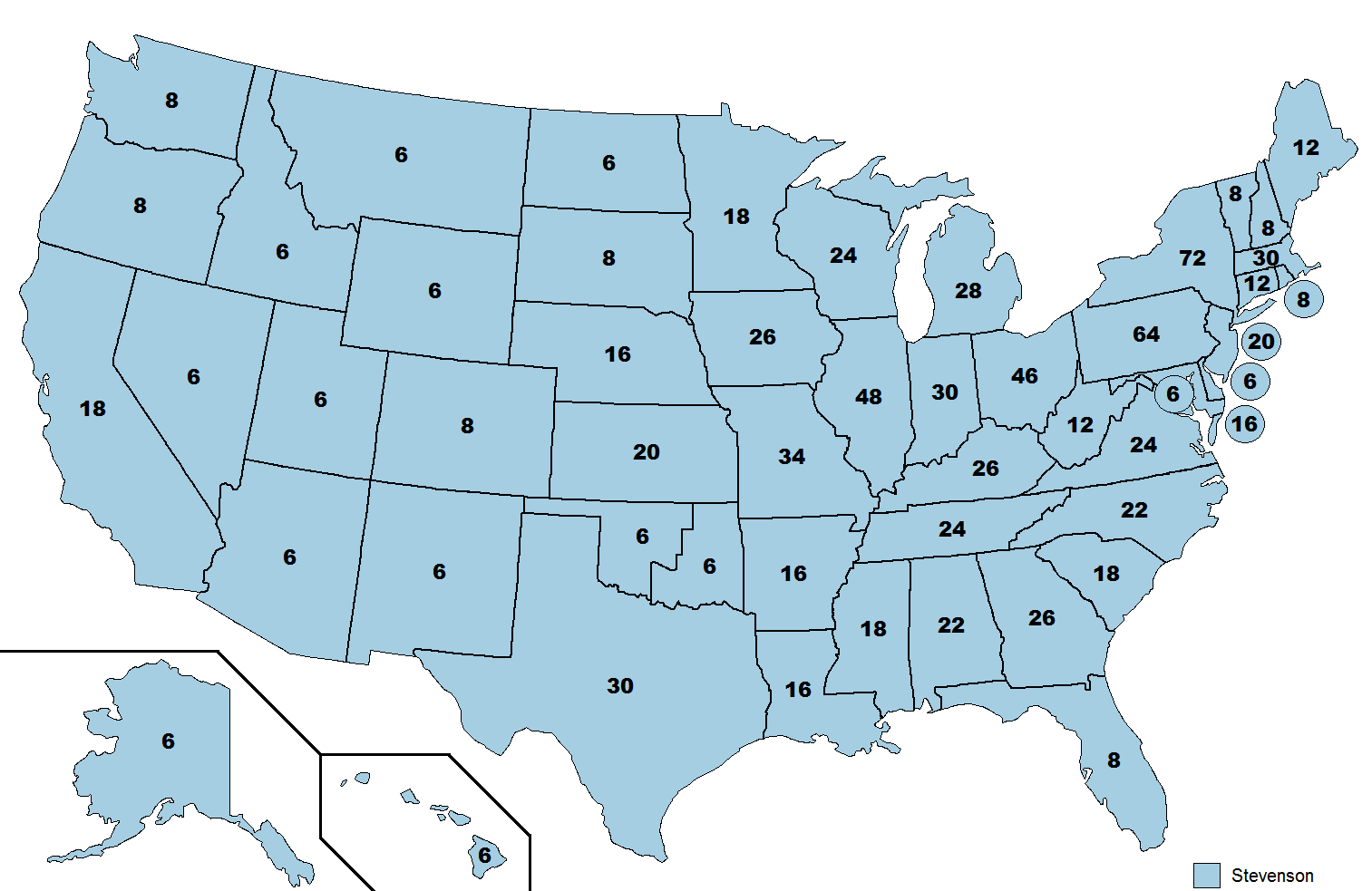
1st Vice Presidential Ballot After Shifts

== See also ==
- History of the United States Democratic Party
- List of Democratic National Conventions
- U.S. presidential nomination convention
- 1900 United States presidential election
- 1900 Republican National Convention

Preceded by 1896; Chicago, Illinois	Democratic National Conventions	Succeeded by 1904; St. Louis, Missouri
