= Lowe and Campbell Athletic Goods =

Sports equipment manufacturer and retailer

Lowe and Campbell Athletic Goods was a sports equipment manufacturer and retailer based in Kansas City, Missouri until 1931 when it was acquired by Wilson Sporting Goods.

In the 1920s, the company, which was based at 15th and Baltimore in Downtown Kansas City, sponsored a series of basketball teams that were a powerhouse in Amateur Athletic Union at time when the AAU National Championships involved colleges, private athletic clubs, and factory-sponsored teams.

In 1921, the team placed fourth in the AAU after losing to the Kansas City Athletic Club (KCAC) in the semifinals, and then lost to the Atlanta Athletic Club 36-31 in the playoff for third place.

In 1922, the team won the AAU National Championship defeating the KCAC 42-28 in all Kansas City game title game held at Convention Hall in Kansas City.

Its players included brothers George and Fred Williams, George Reeves, and George “Pidge” Browning won all AAU honors, and were then recruited to play for the KCAC which won the national title the following year.

Another player on the 1922 team was Frederick J. Bowman who had served with Harry S. Truman with Battery D, 129th Field Artillery, 60th Brigade, 35th Infantry Division during World War I. During lunch Bowman would visit Truman at his haberdashery three blocks away by the Muehlbach Hotel. Bowman would go on to serve as president of Wilson Sporting Goods in 1951.

The team reached the quarterfinals in 1931 but was eliminated by the KCAC. It was also acquired by Wilson Sporting Goods that year.
