= Buffalo Germans =

- Leagues: Amateur Athletic Union 1901-1925
- Founded: 1895
- Folded: 1925
- Championships: 1 AAU / Olympic (1904); 1 AAU / Pan-American Exposition (1901)

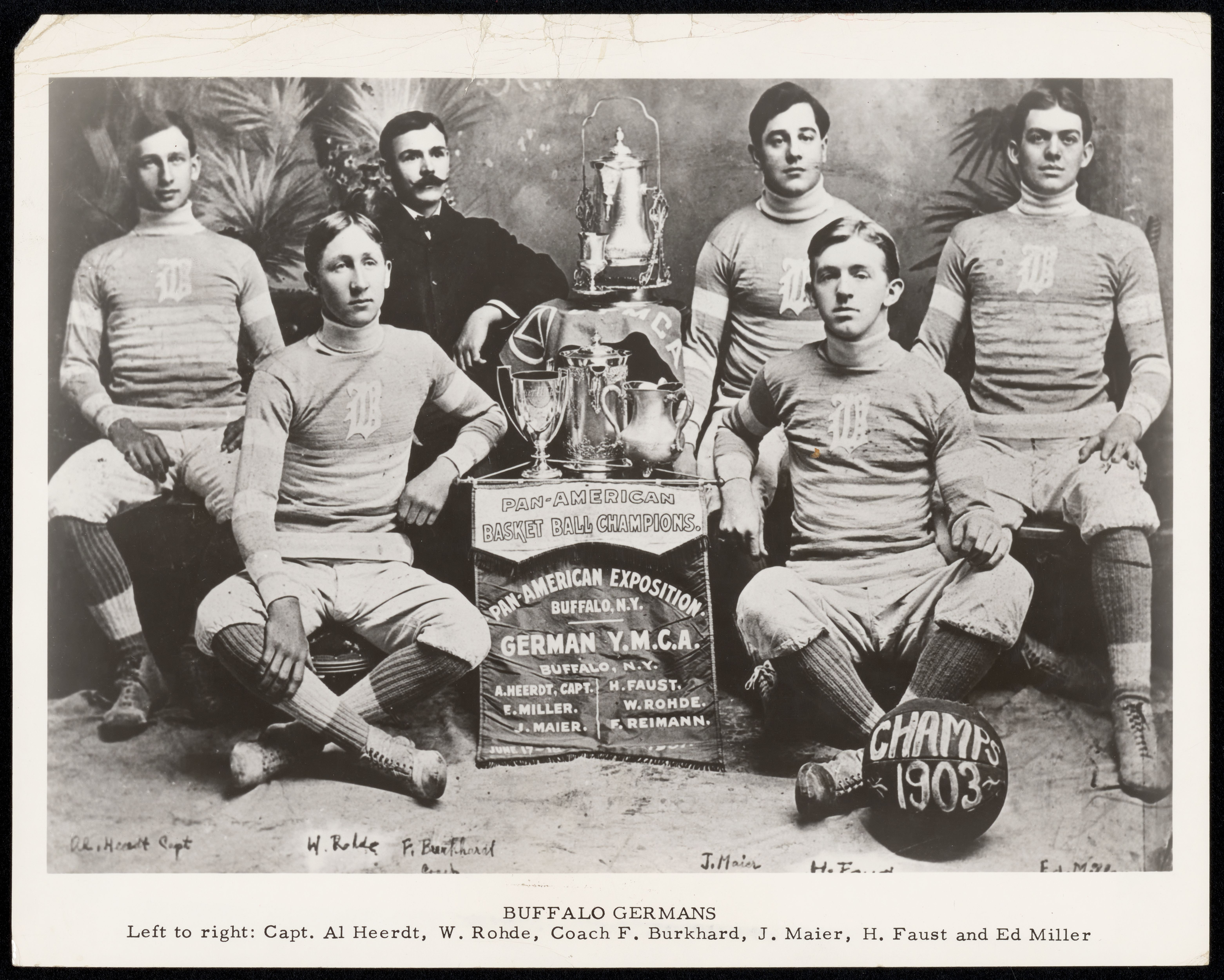
The Buffalo Germans in 1903

The Buffalo Germans was an early basketball team formed in 1895 at a YMCA on Buffalo's East Side. Team members included Dr. Fred Burkhardt (coach), Philip Dischinger, Henry J. Faust, Alfred A. Heerdt (captain), Edward Linneborn, John I. Maier, Albert W. Manweiler, Edward C. Miller, Harry J. Miller, Charles P. Monahan, George L. Redlein, Edmund Reimann, Williams C. Rhode and George Schell.

Chuck Taylor claimed to play as a forward for the Germans as well as the Akron Firestone Non-Skids and the New York Celtics in industrial league basketball for 11 years between 1918 and 1930. There is no documentary evidence to support this contention.

The team was elected to the Basketball Hall of Fame in 1961, and is now one of only twelve teams to be elected as a whole.

In 1904 the team won the AAU national tournament, which served as a demonstration sport at the St. Louis Olympics.

From 1908 to 1910 the team won 111 straight games.

The team was disbanded in 1925 after compiling a 792–86 record. However, the team would end up continuing to exist either as a continuation or as a second generation version of the team in what would be known as the Buffalo Bisons, a team that would originally compete for only the inaugural season of the original American Basketball League. However, it's suggested the team would later continue existing long after that sole season in the ABL with brief stints in the New York State Basketball League, the Midwest Basketball League, and the National Basketball League, with the last league being notable for it eventually merging operations with the rivaling Basketball Association of America to become the National Basketball Association. Regardless, one of the Germans' players from the old days, Alfred Heerdt, would end up becoming the general manager (and later the owner of the franchise) when they wound up being created. Not only that, but the Buffalo Bisons from that time would not be related to the Buffalo Bisons team that briefly was named that in 1946 before becoming the present day Atlanta Hawks in the NBA.
