= Abraham W. Patrick =

American senator and judge

Abraham W. Patrick

Abraham Westfall Patrick (August 2, 1829-September 26, 1909) was an American senator and judge from Ohio. A Democrat, Patrick was the favorite son candidate for Vice President of the United States at the 1900 Democratic National Convention. He finished fourth behind eventual nominee Adlai Stevenson I.

Patrick, the son of a judge, was born in 1829 in New Philadelphia, Ohio in Tuscarawas County. He studied law at Franklin College in New Athens, Ohio and thereafter became a public prosecutor. In 1868, he was nominated as a presidential elector for the Ohio Democratic Party. In 1871, he was elected to the State Senate.
