= 1936 Olympics =

1936 Olympics may refer to:

- 1936 Winter Olympics, which were held in Garmisch-Partenkirchen, Germany
- 1936 Summer Olympics, which were held in Berlin, Germany
