= Edward C. Miller =

American basketball player (1881–1969)

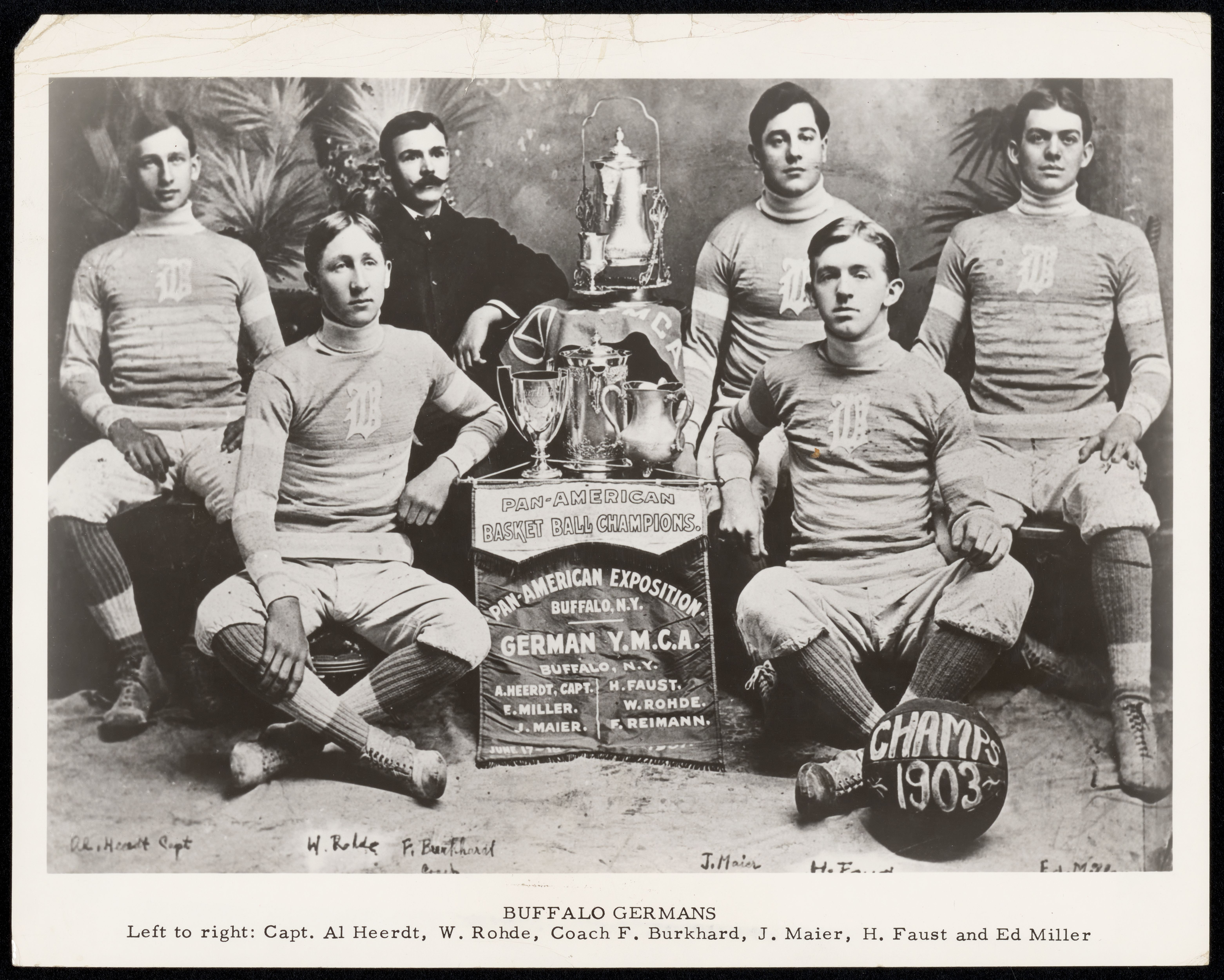
- Miller (far right) in 1903

Personal information
- Born: June 15, 1881
- Died: February 26, 1969 (aged 87) Snyder, New York
- Listed height: 6 ft 2 in (1.88 m)

Career information
- Playing career: 1895–1925

Career history

Playing
- 1895–1907: Buffalo Germans
- 1907–1909: Greensburg Billikins
- 1909–1925: Buffalo Germans

Coaching
- 1919–1920: Canisius
Medals
Basketball
Representing the United States
Olympic Games
Gold medal – first place	1904 St. Louis	Basketball

Edward Carl Miller (June 15, 1881 – February 26, 1969) was an American basketball player who was a member of the Buffalo Germans for their entire 30-year history, except for a two year period (1907–1909) when he was a member of the Greensburg Billikins of the Central Basketball League. The Germans won 923 of 1000 games, including a 111-game winning streak. They won the basketball tournament at the Pan-American Exposition and won the gold medal at the 1904 Summer Olympics. The Germans were elected to the Naismith Memorial Basketball Hall of Fame in 1961. Miller was the head coach of the Canisius Golden Griffins men's basketball team during the 1919–20 season and led the team to a 10–4 record. Miller died on February 26, 1969 at his home in Snyder, New York. He was the last surviving member of the Germans.
