= Bill Wheatley =

American basketball player

Personal information
- Born: July 5, 1909 Gypsum, Kansas, U.S.
- Died: February 5, 1992 (aged 82) El Cerrito, California, U.S.
- Listed height: 6 ft 4 in (1.93 m)

Career information
- High school: Kipp (Kipp, Kansas)
- College: Kansas Wesleyan (1927–1931)
- Position: Guard

Career history

Playing
- 1935–1936: McPherson Globe Refiners
- 1936–193?: Kansas City Life

Coaching
- 1946–1948: Oakland Bittners

Career highlights
- AAU All-American (1936)
Medals
Men's basketball
Representing United States
Olympic Games
Gold medal – first place	1936 Berlin	Team competition

William John Wheatley (July 5, 1909 – February 5, 1992) was an American basketball player who competed in the 1936 Summer Olympics. He was part of the American basketball team, which won the gold medal. He played two matches including the final. He later coached the Salt Lake City entry in American Basketball League of the AAU.

Wheatley died in his El Cerrito, California, home on February 5, 1992, at age 82.
