= Denver Auditorium Arena =

Indoor arena in Denver, Colorado, U.S.

- Location in Colorado Location in the United States Location in North America
- Interactive map of Denver Auditorium Arena
- Full name: Quigg Newton Denver Municipal Auditorium Theatre and Arena
- Former names: Denver Municipal Auditorium (1908–1948)
- Address: 1323 Champa St; Denver, Colorado 80204
- Location: Downtown Denver
- Coordinates: 39°44′40″N 104°59′51″W
- Owner: City and County of Denver
- Capacity: Arena: 12,500 (original); 6,841 (renovated); Theatre: 2,240

Construction
- Groundbreaking: September 22, 1907; 119 years ago
- Opened: July 7, 1908; 118 years ago
- Renovated: 1947–1948; 1952; 1956
- Closed: 1990; 36 years ago
- Cost: $400,000 ($13.8 million in 2025 dollars)
- Architect: Robert Willison

Tenants
- Denver Nuggets (NBL/NBA) (1948–1950); Denver Rockets/Nuggets (ABA) (1967–1975); Denver Racquets (WTT) (1974); Denver Comets (IVA) (1977–1979)

Denver Auditorium Arena was an indoor arena located at the corner of 13th and Champa Streets in Denver, Colorado. It was constructed as the Denver Municipal Auditorium in 1908 during the administration of Mayor Robert W. Speer. The building was opened on July 7, 1908, and was the site of the 1908 Democratic National Convention.

With a capacity of 12,500, the building was at the time of its opening the second largest in America to Madison Square Garden. Initially, the venue was configured and equipped to hold numerous kinds of events including theater, opera, conventions, sporting events, exhibitions, concerts, and more. Renovations were made to the building in the 1940s, and in 1953 the southern half of the building was converted into the Auditorium Arena, a pure sporting venue with seating capacity of 6,841.

== Tenants ==
It hosted the ABA's Denver Rockets, later the Denver Nuggets, from 1967 until they left for McNichols Sports Arena in 1975. The Auditorium Arena was an annual host of the Colorado high school state basketball tournament, primarily for the smaller-enrollment classifications.

The Auditorium Arena was home to the Denver Comets of the professional International Volleyball Association from 1977 to 1979, and home to the Denver Racquets of World Team Tennis in 1974, when they won the league championship before moving to Phoenix for the 1975 season.

From 1937 to 1967, it hosted the finals of the AAU basketball championship.

On December 26, 1968, the rock group Led Zeppelin played their first concert in the United States at the Auditorium Arena.

In the last several years of its existence, the building was a popular venue for professional wrestling, hosting both AWA and WWF events.

In 1990, the Arena portion of the building (built in 1953) was demolished to make room for the Temple Buell Theatre, and in 2005, the Auditorium portion of the building (built in 1907–08) was remodeled into the Ellie Caulkins Opera House.

Events and tenants
Preceded by First arena	Home of the Denver Nuggets (original); 1948–1950	Succeeded by Defunct
Preceded by First arena	Home of the Denver Rockets/Nuggets; 1967–1975	Succeeded by McNichols Sports Arena
