= Jimmy Needles =

American basketball player and coach (1900–1969)

Biographical details
- Born: March 3, 1900; Tacoma, Washington, U.S.
- Died: July 22, 1969 (aged 69); San Francisco, California, U.S.

Playing career

Basketball
- 1923–1924: St. Ignatius (CA)

Coaching career (HC unless noted)

Basketball
- 1923–1931: St. Ignatius (CA) / San Francisco
- 1936–1940: Loyola (CA)
- 1942–1944: San Francisco

Football
- 1924–1931: St. Ignatius (CA) / San Francisco

Administrative career (AD unless noted)
- 1941–?: San Francisco

Head coaching record
- Overall: 161–101 (basketball); 25–31–8 (football)

James R. Needles (March 3, 1900 – July 22, 1969) was an American basketball coach best known for being the United States' first Olympic basketball coach in 1936.

Born in Tacoma, Washington, in 1900, Needles studied at the University of San Francisco, then known as St. Ignatius College. Needles played basketball for the then-Grey Fog, becoming a player-coach during his senior year in 1924. He was appointed the basketball team's full-time coach upon his graduation. Needles coached Saint Ignatius College to two championships, capturing the Far Western Conference championship in 1928 and the Pacific Association title in 1929.

Needles also coached Saint Ignatius' football team during this period, leading them to a runner-up spot in the 1928 Far Western Regionals.

Illness forced Needles to resign from Saint Ignatius College in 1932, but he began coaching Amateur Athletic Union (AAU) basketball soon afterwards. Needles coached the Universal Pictures team to the AAU championship finals, and as a result, he was appointed as head coach of the U.S.'s first team at the Olympic basketball team, which competed in the 1936 Summer Olympics in Berlin, Germany.

Following the Berlin Olympics, Needles returned to the college ranks, this time at Loyola of Los Angeles, where he mentored future coaches Pete Newell, Phil Woolpert and future Loyola coach Edwin "Scotty" McDonald. He returned to the University of San Francisco in 1941 as its athletic director and was instrumental in Newell's appointment as head basketball coach in 1946.

Needles died at his home, in San Francisco, on July 22, 1969.
