= Gene Johnson (coach) =

American football and basketball coach (1902–1989)

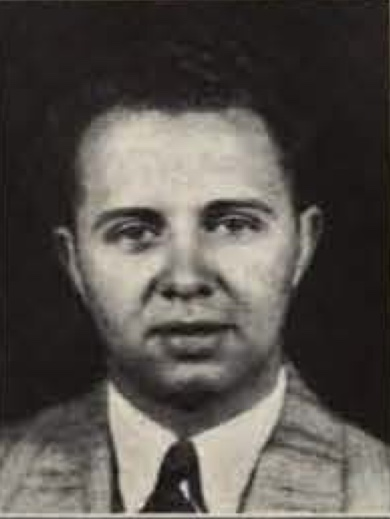
- Johnson from the 1930 Parnassus

Biographical details
- Born: February 14, 1902; Emporia, Kansas, U.S.
- Died: December 27, 1989 (aged 87); Overland Park, Kansas, U.S.

Playing career

Football
- ?: College of Emporia

Basketball
- ?: Emporia State

Coaching career (HC unless noted)

Basketball
- 1928–1933: Wichita State
- 1938–1943: Kansas Wesleyan
- 1955–1957: Wichita Vickers
- 1957–1958: Kansas City Kaycees
- 1959–1960: Buchan Bakers

Football
- 1938–1942: Kansas Wesleyan

Head coaching record
- Overall: 160–59 (basketball); 19–16–9 (football)

Accomplishments and honors

Championships
- Football; KCAC (1940)

Eugene Raymond Johnson (February 14, 1902 – December 27, 1989) was an American football and basketball coach. He was born and raised in Hartford, KS and is a graduate of Hartford High School. Some sources list him as the head coach of the 1936 United States Olympic basketball team and other sources give that honor to Jimmy Needles and state that Johnson was the assistant coach. His innovations in basketball include being credited with creating the full court press. he died on December 27, 1989 at age 87

== Basketball ==
=== Wichita ===
In 1928, at the age of 26, Johnson was named head coach at Wichita University (now called Wichita State University) in Wichita, Kansas. Johnson's teams compiled a record of 74 wins and 24 losses in his five years as head coach of the "Shockers". He led the Shockers to a Central Intercollegiate Conference co-championship in 1933 (his last season at the school) and the team finished second three times and third once.

=== McPherson Globe Refiners (AAU) ===
After coaching at Wichita University, Johnson left for a coaching career in the Amateur Athletic Union, coaching the McPherson Globe Refiners to a national title and later coaching the Wichita Vickers.

=== USA Olympic Basketball ===
Johnson was an assistant coach of the first United States Olympic basketball team in 1936. Several of his players in his AAU teams, including his brother Francis Johnson.

=== Kansas Wesleyan ===
In 1938, Johnson went to Kansas Wesleyan University to become the head basketball coach. He led the team to several conference championships and as of 2005 holds the second-most wins for a single season at the school.

== College football ==
Johnson was the tenth head football coach at Kansas Wesleyan, serving for five seasons, from 1938 until 1942, and compiling a record of 19–16–9.

In 1940, the team was declared conference champions of the Kansas Collegiate Athletic Conference by outscoring their opponents for the season 131 to 46 and by winning every home game.

== NIBL ==
In 1955–56 and 1956–57 Johnson coached the Wichita Vickers of the AAU National Industrial Basketball League. In 1957–58, he coached the Kansas City Kaycees and in 1959–60 he coached the NIBL Seattle Buchan Bakers.

== Head coaching record ==
=== Football ===
Year	Team	Overall	Conference	Standing	Bowl/playoffs
Kansas Wesleyan Coyotes (Kansas Collegiate Athletic Conference) (1938–1942)
1938	Kansas Wesleyan	2–6–1	1–4	T–5th	
1939	Kansas Wesleyan	2–2–4	2–2–2	T–3rd	
1940	Kansas Wesleyan	6–1–2	5–0–1	1st	
1941	Kansas Wesleyan	4–3	4–2	4th	
1942	Kansas Wesleyan	5–4–2	3–1–2	3rd	
Kansas Wesleyan:		19–16–9	15–9–5		
Total:		19–16–9			
National championship Conference title Conference division title or championship game berth
