= Convention Hall =

Former convention center in Kansas City, Missouri

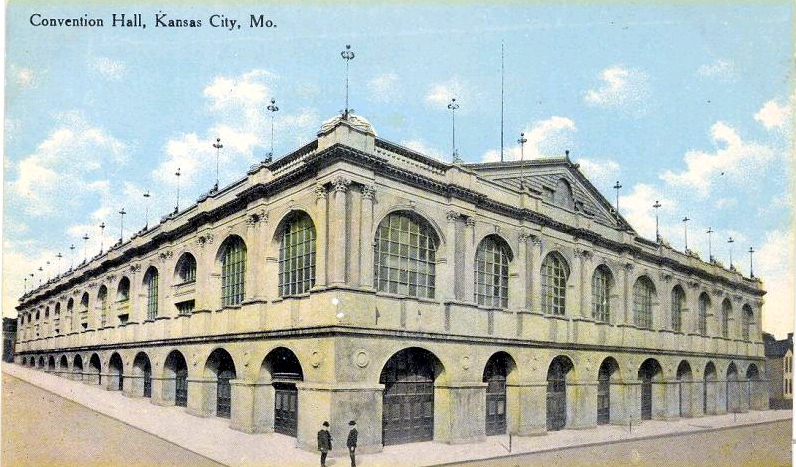
- Convention Hall was depicted in a 1908 postcard.
- Interactive map of Convention Hall
- Location: 13th and Central Streets; Kansas City, Missouri, U.S.
- Coordinates: 39.098727°N 94.58697°W

Construction
- Opened: February 22, 1899; 127 years ago
- Closed: 1936
- Demolished: 1936
- Cost: US$225,000
- Architect: Frederick E. Hill

Tenants
- 1900 Democratic National Convention; 1928 Republican National Convention; Ku Klux Klan

Convention Hall was a major indoor arena and convention center located at 13th and Central Streets in Kansas City, Missouri. It operated between 1899 and 1936 as a central hub for civic life in Kansas City and is best known for hosting the 1900 Democratic National Convention and the 1928 Republican National Convention.

A dramatic fire destroyed it on April 4, 1900, just three months before the city was scheduled to host the Democratic National Convention. In an effort that became known as the "Kansas City Spirit", the hall was rebuilt in only 90 days to ensure the convention could proceed as planned.

The multipurpose venue hosted cultural performances by figures such as John Philip Sousa and Sarah Bernhardt, and the controversial Ku Klux Klan rallies in the 1920s. It was a shelter for thousands of refugees from the Great Flood of 1903. The hall was demolished in 1936 to provide parking for the new Municipal Auditorium.

== History ==
It was designed by Frederick E. Hill and built at the corner of 13th and Central for $225,000 (equivalent to about $8,700,000 in 2025). It was opened on February 22, 1899, with a performance by the John Philip Sousa band.

It was destroyed in a fire on April 4, 1900, the year that Kansas City was scheduled to host the Democratic National Convention over July 4. Hill redesigned a new hall that would be fireproof and it was built in 90 days in an effort called "Kansas City Spirit". One page at the convention was a local 16-year-old Democrat, Harry S. Truman.

During the flood of 1903, the hall housed several thousand refugees. The final 110 refugees were sent to tent camps at 31st and Summit. The hall had to be fumigated after their departure on June 12, 1903.

The world's largest pipe organ, which became the nucleus of Philadelphia's Wanamaker Organ, was originally planned for the north end of the hall after it was exhibited as the centerpiece of Festival Hall at the Louisiana Purchase Exposition of 1904. The Kansas City hall operators backed out of the contract before installation when it was discovered the document had never legally been ratified.

The hall hosted the 1928 Republican Convention and was torn down in 1936 to become a parking lot for the new Municipal Auditorium.

The hall hosted various traveling events including a Sarah Bernhardt performance of Camille. Its most controversial use was hosting a series of Ku Klux Klan rallies in 1922–1924.

== See also ==
- City workhouse castle, a contemporary civic building
