= Basketball at the 1904 Summer Olympics =

th Olympic Basketball Tournament
- St. Louis 1904

Tournament details
- Olympics: 1904 Summer Olympics
- Host nation: United States
- City: St. Louis
- Duration: 11 July - 12 July

Tournaments
	Berlin 1936 →

Basketball appeared at the 1904 Summer Olympics in St. Louis for the first time as a demonstration sport.

There were seven different events that took place: an amateur championship, a college championship, a YMCA championship, two high school championships, and two elementary school championships.

== Men's amateur championships ==
The Buffalo German YMCA dominated the men's championship while other teams frequently failed to field a complete team or show up for all their scheduled games, resulting in several lopsided scores and forfeited matches.

=== Round-robin table results ===
Team	Wins	Losses	Points (Table)	Points For	Points Against
Buffalo German YMCA	5	0	10	354	120
Chicago Central YMCA	4	1	8	90	54
Missouri Athletic Club	3	2	6	51	136
St. Louis Central YMCA	2	3	4	76	121
Xavier Athletic Club	0	4	0	80	133
Turner Tigers	0	4	0	18	105

=== Individual game results ===
Match #	Winning team	Final score	Losing team
Match #1	Buffalo German YMCA	77 – 6	Turner Tigers
Match #2	Buffalo German YMCA	36 – 28	Xavier Athletic Club
Match #3	Buffalo German YMCA	105 – 50	St. Louis Central YMCA
Match #4	Chicago Central YMCA	56 – 15	Xavier Athletic Club
Match #5	Chicago Central YMCA	2 – 0 (Forfeit)	Turner Tigers
Match #6	Missouri Athletic Club	2 – 0 (Forfeit)	St. Louis Central YMCA
Match #7	Chicago Central YMCA	2 – 0 (Forfeit)	Missouri Athletic Club
Match #8	Missouri Athletic Club	39 – 37	Xavier Athletic Club
Match #9	St. Louis Central YMCA	24 – 12	Turner Tigers
Match #10	Buffalo German YMCA	39 – 28	Chicago Central YMCA
Match #11	Buffalo German YMCA	97 – 8	Missouri Athletic Club
Match #12	Chicago Central YMCA	2 – 0 (Forfeit)	St. Louis Central YMCA
Match #13	Missouri Athletic Club	2 – 0 (Forfeit)	Turner Tigers
Match #14	St. Louis Central YMCA	2 – 0 (Forfeit)	Xavier Athletic Club
Match #15	Xavier Athletic Club	Both teams failed to appear (No contest)	Turner Tigers

== College basketball ==
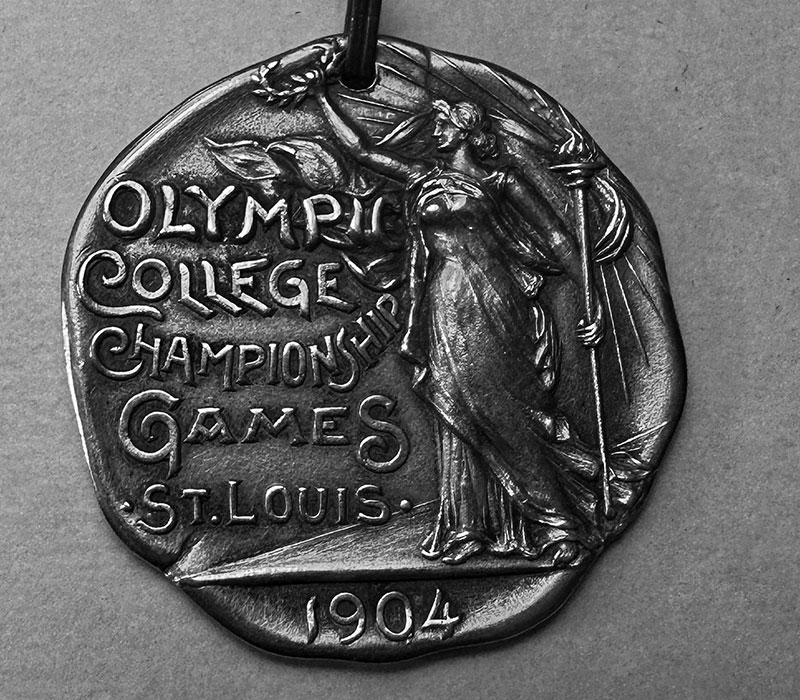
Gold medal won by Hiram College at the 1904 Olympic Games in St. Louis

- Hiram College def. Wheaton College, 23–20
- Hiram College def. Latter-day Saints' University, 25–18
- Wheaton College def. Latter-day Saints' University, 40–35
1. Hiram College, 2–0
2. Wheaton College, 1–1
3. Latter-day Saints' University, 0–2

== Women's basketball ==
The Fort Shaw Indian School Girls Basketball Team faced off against the Missouri All-Stars, alumnae of Central High in St. Louis. Fort Shaw won the first game 24-2. The St. Louis team failed to show up for the second game and forfeited. However, the team asked to continue the competition and Fort Shaw agreed. At the end of the second game the score stood 17 to 6, winning the Fort Shaw girls the title as the basketball champions of the 1904 St. Louis World's Fair. On August 25 the girls won the silver and gold cup for women's basketball at the fair. Despite being signed up to play only in the women's basketball bracket, the team won in the general competition, something which was conveniently omitted from Spalding's Athletic Almanac. The Fort Shaw team story is told in a book entitled Full Court Quest.
