= United States at the 1956 Summer Olympics =

- Flag of the United States with 48 stars. This was the last Olympics where this design was used.
- IOC code: USA
- NOC: United States Olympic Committee

in Melbourne/Stockholm
- Competitors: 297 (251 men and 46 women) in 18 sports
- Flag bearer: Norman Armitage
- Medals Ranked 2nd: Gold 32 Silver 25 Bronze 17 Total 74

Summer Olympics appearances (overview)
- 1896; 1900; 1904; 1908; 1912; 1920; 1924; 1928; 1932; 1936; 1948; 1952; 1956; 1960; 1964; 1968; 1972; 1976; 1980; 1984; 1988; 1992; 1996; 2000; 2004; 2008; 2012; 2016; 2020; 2024; 2028

Other related appearances
- 1906 Intercalated Games

The United States competed at the 1956 Summer Olympics in Melbourne, Australia. 297 competitors, 251 men and 46 women, took part in 139 events in 18 sports. It was the last Olympics in which U.S. athletes competed under the 48-star flag.

== Medalists ==
Medal	Name	Sport	Event	Date
Gold	Charles Dumas	Athletics	Men's high jump	November 23
Gold	Charles Vinci	Weightlifting	56 kg	November 23
Gold	Issac Berger	Weightlifting	60 kg	November 23
Gold	Bobby Morrow	Athletics	Men's 100 m	November 24
Gold	Glenn Davis	Athletics	Men's 400 m hurdles	November 24
Gold	Greg Bell	Athletics	Men's long jump	November 24
Gold	Hal Connolly	Athletics	Men's hammer throw	November 24
Gold	Tom Courtney	Athletics	Men's 800 m	November 26
Gold	Bob Richards	Athletics	Men's pole vault	November 26
Gold	Tommy Kono	Weightlifting	82.5 kg	November 26
Gold	Paul Anderson	Weightlifting	+90 kg	November 26
Gold	Bobby Morrow	Athletics	Men's 200 m	November 27
Gold	Tom Courtney; Charles Jenkins Sr. Lou Jones; Jesse Mashburn	Athletics	Men's 4 × 400 m relay	November 27
Gold	Al Oerter	Athletics	Men's discus throw	November 27
Gold	James Fifer; Duvall Hecht	Rowing	Coxless pair	November 27
Gold	Dan Ayrault; Conn Findlay; Kurt Seiffert (c)	Rowing	Coxed pair	November 27
Gold	William Becklean (c); Donald Beer; Thomas Charlton; John Cooke; Caldwell Esselstyn; Charles Grimes; Robert Morey; Rusty Wailes; David Wight	Rowing	Eight	November 27
Gold	Lee Calhoun	Athletics	Men's 110 m hurdles	November 28
Gold	Parry O'Brien	Athletics	Men's shot put	November 28
Gold	Charles Jenkins Sr.	Athletics	Men's 400 m	November 29
Gold	Milt Campbell	Athletics	Men's decathlon	November 30
Gold	Thane Baker; Leamon King; Bobby Morrow; Ira Murchison	Athletics	Men's 4 × 100 m relay	December 1
Gold	Mildred McDaniel	Athletics	Women's high jump	December 1
Gold	United States men's national basketball team: Dick Boushka; Carl Cain; Chuck Darling; Billy Evans; Gilbert Ford; Burdette Haldorson; Bill Hougland; Robert Jeangerard; K.C. Jones; Bill Russell; Ron Tomsic; Jim Walsh	Basketball	Men's tournament	December 1
Gold	James Boyd	Boxing	Light heavyweight	December 1
Gold	Pete Rademacher	Boxing	Heavyweight	December 1
Gold	Bob Clotworthy	Diving	Men's 3 m springboard	December 1
Gold	William Yorzyk	Swimming	Men's 200 m butterfly	December 1
Gold	Pat McCormick	Diving	Women's 3 m springboard	December 4
Gold	Lawrence Low; Herbert Williams	Sailing	Star	December 5
Gold	Shelley Mann	Swimming	Women's 100 m butterfly	December 5
Gold	Pat McCormick	Diving	Women's 10 m platform	December 7
Silver	Thane Baker	Athletics	Men's 100 m	November 24
Silver	Eddie Southern	Athletics	Men's 400 m hurdles	November 24
Silver	John Bennett	Athletics	Men's long jump	November 24
Silver	Pete George	Weightlifting	75 kg	November 24
Silver	Bob Gutowski	Athletics	Men's pole vault	November 26
Silver	Dave Sheppard	Weightlifting	90 kg	November 26
Silver	Andy Stanfield	Athletics	Men's 200 m	November 27
Silver	Fortune Gordien	Athletics	Men's discus throw	November 27
Silver	Willye White	Athletics	Women's long jump	November 27
Silver	Pat Costello; Jim Gardiner	Rowing	Double sculls	November 27
Silver	James McIntosh; Art McKinlay; John McKinlay; John Welchli	Rowing	Coxless four	November 27
Silver	Jack Davis	Athletics	Men's 110 m hurdles	November 28
Silver	Bill Nieder	Athletics	Men's shot put	November 28
Silver	William Andre; Jack Daniels; George Lambert	Modern pentathlon	Team	November 28
Silver	Rafer Johnson	Athletics	Men's decathlon	November 30
Silver	José Torres	Boxing	Light middleweight	December 1
Silver	Donald Harper	Diving	Men's 3 m springboard	December 1
Silver	Danny Hodge	Wrestling	Freestyle middleweight	December 1
Silver	George Breen; Dick Hanley; Tim Jecko^{[a]} Ford Konno; Sonny Tanabe^{[a]} Bill Woolsey	Swimming	Men's 4 × 200 m freestyle relay	December 3
Silver	Jeanne Stunyo	Diving	Women's 3 m springboard	December 4
Silver	Carin Cone	Swimming	Women's 100 m backstroke	December 5
Silver	Nancy Ramey	Swimming	Women's 100 m butterfly	December 5
Silver	Gary Tobian	Diving	Men's 10 m platform	December 6
Silver	Betty Brey^{[a]} Kay Knapp^{[a]} Shelley Mann; Joan Rosazza; Sylvia Ruuska; Marley Shriver^{[a]} Nancy Simons	Swimming	Women's 4 × 100 m freestyle relay	December 6
Silver	Juno Stover-Irwin	Diving	Women's 10 m platform	December 7
Bronze	Josh Culbreath	Athletics	Men's 400 m hurdles	November 24
Bronze	Jim George	Weightlifting	82.5 kg	November 26
Bronze	Thane Baker	Athletics	Men's 200 m	November 27
Bronze	Des Koch	Athletics	Men's discus throw	November 27
Bronze	Jack Kelly Jr.	Rowing	Single sculls	November 27
Bronze	Joel Shankle	Athletics	Men's 110 m hurdles	November 28
Bronze	Offutt Pinion	Shooting	50 m pistol	November 30
Bronze	Isabelle Daniels; Mae Faggs; Margaret Matthews; Wilma Rudolph	Athletics	Women's 4 × 100 m relay	December 1
Bronze	Peter Blair	Wrestling	Freestyle light heavyweight	December 1
Bronze	George Breen	Swimming	Men's 400 m freestyle	December 4
Bronze	John Marvin	Sailing	Finn	December 5
Bronze	Mary Sears	Swimming	Women's 100 m butterfly	December 5
Bronze	Richard Conner	Diving	Men's 10 m platform	December 6
Bronze	Frank McKinney	Swimming	Men's 100 m backstroke	December 6
Bronze	Paula Jean Myers	Diving	Women's 10 m platform	December 7
Bronze	George Breen	Swimming	Men's 1500 m freestyle	December 7
Bronze	Sylvia Ruuska	Swimming	Women's 400 m freestyle	December 7

Medals by sport
Sport	1st place, gold medalist(s)	2nd place, silver medalist(s)	3rd place, bronze medalist(s)	Total
Athletics	16	10	5	31
Weightlifting	4	2	1	7
Diving	3	4	2	9
Rowing	3	2	1	6
Swimming	2	4	5	11
Boxing	2	1	0	3
Sailing	1	0	1	2
Basketball	1	0	0	1
Wrestling	0	1	1	2
Modern pentathlon	0	1	0	1
Shooting	0	0	1	1
Total	32	25	17	74

Medals by day
Day	Date	1st place, gold medalist(s)	2nd place, silver medalist(s)	3rd place, bronze medalist(s)	Total
1	November 23	3	0	0	3
2	November 24	4	4	1	9
3	November 25	0	0	0	0
4	November 26	4	2	1	7
5	November 27	6	5	3	14
6	November 28	2	3	1	6
7	November 29	1	0	0	1
8	November 30	1	1	1	3
9	December 1	7	3	2	12
10	December 2	0	0	0	0
11	December 3	0	1	0	1
12	December 4	1	1	1	3
13	December 5	2	2	2	6
14	December 6	0	2	2	4
15	December 7	1	1	3	5
16	December 8	0	0	0	0
Total		32	25	17	74

Medals by gender
Gender	1st place, gold medalist(s)	2nd place, silver medalist(s)	3rd place, bronze medalist(s)	Total
Male	28	19	13	60
Female	4	6	4	14
Total	32	25	17	74

Multiple medalists
Name	Sport	1st place, gold medalist(s)	2nd place, silver medalist(s)	3rd place, bronze medalist(s)	Total
Bobby Morrow	Athletics	3	0	0	3
Thane Baker	Athletics	1	1	1	3
George Breen	Swimming	0	1	2	3
Tom Courtney	Athletics	2	0	0	2
Charles Jenkins Sr.	Athletics	2	0	0	2
Pat McCormick	Diving	2	0	0	2
Shelley Mann	Swimming	1	1	0	2
Sylvia Ruuska	Swimming	0	1	1	2

^{a} Athletes who participated in preliminary round(s) but not the final.

== Athletics ==
Key

- Note–Ranks given for track events are within the athlete's heat only
- Q = Qualified for the next round
- q = Qualified for the next round as a fastest loser or, in field events, by position without achieving the qualifying target

Track & road events
Men

Athlete	Event	Heat		Quarterfinal		Semifinal		Final	
Athlete	Event	Time	Rank	Time	Rank	Time	Rank	Time	Rank
Thane Baker	100 m	10.93	1 Q	10.62	1 Q	10.61	2 Q	10.5	2nd place, silver medalist(s)
Bobby Morrow	100 m	10.90	1 Q	10.3	1 Q	10.3	1 Q	10.5	1st place, gold medalist(s)
Ira Murchison	100 m	10.67	1 Q	10.3	1 Q	10.79	1 Q	10.6	4
Thane Baker	200 m	21.92	1 Q	21.34	1 Q	21.21	1 Q	20.9	3rd place, bronze medalist(s)
Bobby Morrow	200 m	21.95	1 Q	22.03	1 Q	21.43	2 Q	20.6 OR	1st place, gold medalist(s)
Andy Stanfield	200 m	21.69	1 Q	21.22	1 Q	21.35	1 Q	20.7	2nd place, silver medalist(s)
Charles Jenkins Sr.	400 m	48.7	3 Q	47.5	1 Q	46.1	1 Q	46.7	1st place, gold medalist(s)
Lou Jones	400 m	48.1	1 Q	47.4	1 Q	47.3	2 Q	48.1	5
Jim Lea	400 m	48.3	3 Q	48.1	5	Did not advance			
Tom Courtney	800 m	1:52.7	1 Q	—N/a		1:53.6	1 Q	1:47.7 OR	1st place, gold medalist(s)
Arnie Sowell	800 m	1:51.3	2 Q	—N/a		1:50.0	1 Q	1:48.3	4
Lonnie Spurrier	800 m	1:51.5	2 Q	—N/a		1:53.6	2 Q	1:49.3	6
Don Bowden	1500 m	—N/a				3:59.7	11	Did not advance	
Ted Wheeler	1500 m	—N/a				3:50.1	8	Did not advance	
Jerome Walters	1500 m	—N/a				3:55.7	8	Did not advance	
Bill Dellinger	5000 m	14:26.8	Q	—N/a				DNF	
Curt Stone	5000 m	14:52.0		—N/a				Did not advance	
Dick Hart	10,000 m	—N/a							21
Gordon McKenzie	10,000 m	—N/a							18
Max Truex	10,000 m	—N/a						DNF	
Lee Calhoun	110 m hurdles	14.1	1 Q	—N/a		14.0	1 Q	13.5 OR	1st place, gold medalist(s)
Jack Davis	110 m hurdles	14.0	1 Q	—N/a		14.0	1 Q	13.5 OR	2nd place, silver medalist(s)
Joel Shankle	110 m hurdles	14.0	1 Q	—N/a		14.0	2 Q	14.1	3rd place, bronze medalist(s)
Josh Culbreath	400 m hurdles	—N/a		50.9	1 Q	50.9	1 Q	51.6	3rd place, bronze medalist(s)
Glenn Davis	400 m hurdles	—N/a		51.3	1 Q	50.7	2 Q	50.1	1st place, gold medalist(s)
Eddie Southern	400 m hurdles	—N/a		51.3	1 Q	50.1 OR	1 Q	50.8	2nd place, silver medalist(s)
Horace Ashenfelter	3000 m steeplechase	8:51.0		—N/a				Did not advance	
Phil Coleman	3000 m steeplechase	9:10.0		—N/a				Did not advance	
Deacon Jones	3000 m steeplechase	8:47.4	Q	—N/a				9:13.0	9
Thane Baker; Leamon King; Bobby Morrow; Ira Murchison	4 × 100 m relay	40.5	1 Q	—N/a		40.3	1 Q	39.5 WR	1st place, gold medalist(s)
Tom Courtney; Charles Jenkins Sr. Lou Jones; Jesse Mashburn	4 × 400 m relay	3:10.6	Q	—N/a				3:04.7	1st place, gold medalist(s)
Nick Costes	Marathon	—N/a						2:42:20	20
John J. Kelley	Marathon	—N/a						2:43:40	21
Dean Thackwray	Marathon	—N/a						DNF	
James Hewson	20 km walk	—N/a						1:46:24.8	17
Henry Laskau	20 km walk	—N/a						1:36:46.8	12
Bruce MacDonald	20 km walk	—N/a						1:43:25.6	16
Elliott Denman	50 km walk	—N/a						5:12:14.0	11
Leo Sjogren	50 km walk	—N/a						5:12:34.0	12
Adolf Weinacker	50 km walk	—N/a						5:00:16.0	7

Women

Athlete	Event	Heat		Semifinal		Final	
Athlete	Event	Time	Rank	Time	Rank	Time	Rank
Isabelle Daniels	100 m	11.6	2 Q	11.7	3 Q	11.8	4
Mae Faggs	100 m	12.2	3	Did not advance			
Lucinda Williams	100 m	12.0	3	Did not advance			
Meredith Ellis	200 m	26.3	4	Did not advance			
Mae Faggs	200 m	24.9	2 Q	24.8	5	Did not advance	
Wilma Rudolph	200 m	24.6	3	Did not advance			
Constance Darnowski	80 m hurdles	11.9		Did not advance			
Barbara Mueller	80 m hurdles	11.6		Did not advance			
Irene Robertson	80 m hurdles	11.9		Did not advance			
Isabelle Daniels; Mae Faggs; Margaret Matthews; Wilma Rudolph	4 × 100 m relay	45.4	Q	—N/a		44.9	3rd place, bronze medalist(s)

Field events
Men

Athlete	Event	Qualification		Final	
Athlete	Event	Result	Rank	Result	Rank
Greg Bell	Long jump	7.35	7 Q	7.83	1st place, gold medalist(s)
John Bennett	Long jump	7.50	2 Q	7.68	2nd place, silver medalist(s)
Rafer Johnson	Long jump	DNS		Did not advance	
Ira Davis	Triple jump	14.93	16 Q	15.40	11
Bill Sharpe	Triple jump	15.16	9 Q	15.88	4
George Shaw	Triple jump	15.23	7 Q	15.33	12
Charles Dumas	High jump	1.92	=4 Q	2.12 OR	1st place, gold medalist(s)
Phil Reavis	High jump	1.92	=7 Q	2.00	=7
Vern Wilson	High jump	1.92	=7 Q	2.00	10
Bob Gutowski	Pole vault	4.15	7 Q	4.53	2nd place, silver medalist(s)
George Mattos	Pole vault	4.15	1 Q	4.35	4
Bob Richards	Pole vault	4.15	11 Q	4.56 OR	1st place, gold medalist(s)
Ken Bantum	Shot put	15.76	8 Q	17.48	4
Bill Nieder	Shot put	16.76	2 Q	18.18	2nd place, silver medalist(s)
Parry O'Brien	Shot put	16.63	3 Q	18.57 OR	1st place, gold medalist(s)
Fortune Gordien	Discus throw	47.67	12 Q	54.81	2nd place, silver medalist(s)
Des Koch	Discus throw	47.14	16 Q	54.40	3rd place, bronze medalist(s)
Al Oerter	Discus throw	51.19	1 Q	56.36 OR	1st place, gold medalist(s)
Phil Conley	Javelin throw		Q	69.74	10
Benjamin Garcia	Javelin throw		Q	NM	
Cy Young	Javelin throw		Q	68.64	11
Cliff Blair	Hammer throw	DNS		Did not advance	
Hal Connolly	Hammer throw	59.05	3 Q	63.19 OR	1st place, gold medalist(s)
Albert Hall	Hammer throw	57.50	7 Q	61.96	4

Women

Athlete	Event	Qualification		Final	
Athlete	Event	Result	Rank	Result	Rank
Margaret Matthews	Long jump			Did not advance	
Willye White	Long jump		Q	6.09	2nd place, silver medalist(s)
Ann Marie Flynn	High jump	1.50	19	Did not advance	
Mildred McDaniel	High jump		Q	1.76 WR	1st place, gold medalist(s)
Earlene Brown	Shot put		Q	15.12	6
Paula Deubel	Shot put			Did not advance	
Lois Testa	Shot put		Q	13.06	14
Earlene Brown	Discus throw		Q	41.35	4
Pamela Kurrell	Discus throw			Did not advance	
Marjorie Larney	Discus throw			Did not advance	
Karen Anderson	Javelin throw		Q	48.00	8
Marjorie Larney	Javelin throw		Q	45.27	11
Amelia Wershoven	Javelin throw		Q	44.29	14

Combined event – Men's decathlon

Athlete	Event	100 m	LJ	SP	HJ	400 m	110H	DT	PV	JT	1500 m	Points	Rank
Milt Campbell	Result	10.8	7.33	14.76	1.89	48.8	14.0	44.98	3.40	57.08	4:50.6	7937	1st place, gold medalist(s)
Milt Campbell	Points	990	898	850	886	940	1124	775	476	668	330	7937	1st place, gold medalist(s)
Rafer Johnson	Result	10.9	7.34	14.48	1.83	49.3	15.1	42.17	3.90	60.27	4:54.2	7587	2nd place, silver medalist(s)
Rafer Johnson	Points	948	902	819	806	900	788	688	695	738	303	7587	2nd place, silver medalist(s)
Bob Richards	Result	11.7	6.39	12.52	1.75	52.3	16.8	37.77	4.45	44.09	DNS	DNF	
Bob Richards	Points	678	610	628	711	684	458	566	1023	423	DNS	DNF	

== Basketball ==
Summary

Team	Event	Preliminary round				Quarterfinal				Semifinal	Final / BM	
Team	Event	Opposition Result	Opposition Result	Opposition Result	Rank	Opposition Result	Opposition Result	Opposition Result	Rank	Opposition Result	Opposition Result	Rank
United States men	Men's tournament	Japan; W 98–40	Thailand; W 101–29	Philippines; W 121–53	1 Q	Bulgaria; W 85–44	Brazil; W 113–51	Soviet Union; W 85–55	1 Q	Uruguay; W 101–38	Soviet Union; W 89–55	1st place, gold medalist(s)

Roster

	Position	Height	Weight	Age	Hometown	Team
Dick Boushka	Forward	6'5"	195	22	Springfield, Illinois	Wichita Vickers (Saint Louis)
Carl Cain	Forward	6'3"	190	22	Freeport, Illinois	University of Iowa Hawkeyes
Charles Darling	Center	6'8"	225	26	Denver, Colorado	Phillips 66ers (Iowa)
William Evans	Guard	6'1"	185	24	Berea, Kentucky	U.S. Armed Forces (Kentucky)
Gilbert Ford	Guard	6'4"	200	25	Amarillo, Texas	U.S. Armed Forces (Texas)
Burdette Haldorson	Forward	6'7"	207	22	Austin, Minnesota	Phillips 66ers (Colorado)
Bill Hougland	Forward	6'5"	190	26	Beloit, Kansas	Phillips 66ers (Kansas)
Robert Jeangerard	Forward	6'3"	190	23	Winnetka, Illinois	Phillips 66ers (Colorado)
K. C. Jones	Guard	6'1"	201	24	San Francisco, California	University of San Francisco
Bill Russell	Center	6'10"	220	22	Oakland, California	University of San Francisco
Ron Tomsic	Guard	5'11"	185	23	Oakland, California	U.S. Armed Forces (Stanford)
Jim Walsh	Guard	6'4"	190	26	San Francisco, California	Phillips 66ers (Stanford)

Preliminary round

Pos	Team	Pld	W	L	PF	PA	PD	Pts	Qualification
1	United States	3	3	0	320	122	+198	6	Quarterfinals
2	Philippines	3	2	1	224	237	−13	5	Quarterfinals
3	Japan	3	1	2	171	225	−54	4	9th–15th classification round
4	Thailand	3	0	3	134	265	−131	3	9th–15th classification round

Source: FIBA archive
Rules for classification: 1) points; 2) head-to-head points; 3) head-to-head goal average; 4) head-to-head number of points scored.

23 November

United States	98–40	Japan
Scoring by half: 33–20, 65–20

Royal Exhibition Building, Melbourne

24 November

United States	101–29	Thailand
Scoring by half: 54–12, 47–17

Royal Exhibition Building, Melbourne

26 November

United States	121–53	Philippines
Scoring by half: 66–23, 55–30

Royal Exhibition Building, Melbourne

Quarterfinal

Pos	Team	Pld	W	L	PF	PA	PD	Pts	Qualification
1	United States	3	3	0	283	150	+133	6	Semifinals
2	Soviet Union	3	2	1	208	209	−1	5	Semifinals
3	Bulgaria	3	1	2	182	224	−42	4	5th–8th classification playoffs
4	Brazil	3	0	3	192	282	−90	3	5th–8th classification playoffs

Source: FIBA archive
Rules for classification: 1) points; 2) head-to-head points; 3) head-to-head goal average; 4) head-to-head number of points scored.

Bulgaria	44–85	United States
Scoring by half: 19–48, 25–37

United States	113–51	Brazil
Scoring by half: 50–22, 63–29

Soviet Union	55–85	United States
Scoring by half: 32–39, 23–46

Semifinal

30 November
21:30

Boxscore

Uruguay	38–101	United States
Scoring by half: 10–51, 28–50
Pts: Mera, Blixen 8 each		Pts: Tomsic 18

Royal Exhibition Building, Melbourne

Final

1 December
21:30

Boxscore

Soviet Union	55–89	United States
Scoring by half: 27–56, 28–33
Pts: Semyonov 15		Pts: Jeangerard 16

Royal Exhibition Building, Melbourne

== Boxing ==
Key:

- PTS - Win by points
- RSC - Referee stopped contest
- KO - Win by knockout

Athlete	Event	Round of 32	Round of 16	Quarterfinal	Semifinal	Final	
Athlete	Event	Opposition Result	Opposition Result	Opposition Result	Opposition Result	Opposition Result	Rank
Ray Perez	Flyweight	Bye	Majdloch (TCH); W PTS	Dobrescu (ROU); L PTS	Did not advance		
Luis Molina	Lightweight	Bye	Griffiths (AUS); W PTS	Byrne (IRL); L PTS	Did not advance		
Joseph Shaw	Light welterweight	Bye	Carlos (AUS); W PTS	Loubscher (RSA); L PTS	Did not advance		
Pearce Lane	Welterweight	—N/a	Tovar (VEN); W PTS	Tiedt (IRL); L PTS	Did not advance		
José Torres	Light middleweight	—N/a	Read (AUS); W PTS	Scisciana (ITA); W PTS	McCormack (GBR); W PTS	Papp (HUN); L PTS	2nd place, silver medalist(s)
Roger Rouse	Middleweight	—N/a	Bye	Chapron (FRA); L PTS	Did not advance		
James Boyd	Light heavyweight	—N/a	Bye	Díaz (ARG); W PTS	Murauskas (URS); W PTS	Negrea (ROU); W PTS	1st place, gold medalist(s)
Pete Rademacher	Heavyweight	—N/a	Bye	Němec (TCH); W KO	Bekker (RSA); W KO	Mukhin (URS); W KO	1st place, gold medalist(s)

== Canoeing ==
Men

Athlete	Event	Heat		Final	
Athlete	Event	Time	Rank	Time	Rank
William Schuette	C-1 1000 m	—N/a		5:47.7	9
Frank Havens	C-1 10,000 m	—N/a		1:01:23.6	8
George Byers; Richard Moran	C-2 1000 m	5:16.1	5	Did not advance	
John Haas; Frank Krick	C-2 10,000 m	—N/a		58:30.0	10
David Merwin	K-1 1000 m	4:35.9	4	Did not advance	
Robert O'Brien	K-1 10,000 m	—N/a		53:02.8	11
Russell Dermond; John Pagkos	K-2 1000 m	4:22.7	5	Did not advance	
Edward Houston; Kenneth Wilson	K-2 10,000 m	—N/a		51:25.8	12

== Cycling ==
=== Road ===
Athlete	Event	Time / Points	Rank
Joe Becker	Individual	5:38:16	43
Erhard Neumann	Individual	DNF	
David Rhoads	Individual	DNF	
George Van Meter	Individual	DNF	
Joe Becker; Erhard Neumann; David Rhoads; George Van Meter	Team	DNF	

=== Track ===
Sprint

Athlete	Event	Round 1	Repechage 1	Repechage 2	Quarterfinal	Semifinal	Final / BM	
Athlete	Event	Opposition Result	Opposition Result	Opposition Result	Opposition Result	Opposition Result	Opposition Result	Rank
Jack Disney	Sprint	Harrison (GBR), Mejía (COL); W 13.0	Bye		Ploog (AUS); L, L	Did not advance		=5
Donald Ferguson; James Rossi	Tandem	W	Bye		L	Did not advance		=5

Pursuit

Athlete	Event	Elimination round	Quarterfinal	Semifinal	Final / BM	
Athlete	Event	Rank	Opposition Result	Opposition Result	Opposition Result	Rank
Allen Bell; Richard Cortright; Art Longsjo; David Rhoads	Team		Did not advance			=9

Time trial

Athlete	Event	Time	Rank
Allen Bell	1000 m	1:12.8	10

== Diving ==
Men

Athlete	Event	Preliminary		Final		Total	
Athlete	Event	Score	Rank	Score	Rank	Score	Rank
Bob Clotworthy	3 m springboard	90.07	2 Q	69.49	2	159.56	1st place, gold medalist(s)
Donald Harper	3 m springboard	83.42	5 Q	72.81	1	156.23	2nd place, silver medalist(s)
Glen Whitten	3 m springboard	89.20	3 Q	59.35	4	148.55	4
Richard Conner	10 m platform	80.24	1 Q	69.55	4	149.79	3rd place, bronze medalist(s)
William Farrell	10 m platform	75.07	6 Q	64.05	7	139.12	6
Gary Tobian	10 m platform	76.77	4 Q	75.64	1	152.41	2nd place, silver medalist(s)

Women

Athlete	Event	Preliminary		Final		Total	
Athlete	Event	Score	Rank	Score	Rank	Score	Rank
Barbara Gilders-Dudeck	3 m springboard	71.47	3 Q	49.29	4	120.76	4
Pat McCormick	3 m springboard	76.80	1 Q	65.56	1	142.36	1st place, gold medalist(s)
Jeanne Stunyo	3 m springboard	71.04	4 Q	54.85	2	125.89	2nd place, silver medalist(s)
Pat McCormick	10 m platform	51.28	4 Q	33.57	1	84.85	1st place, gold medalist(s)
Paula Jean Myers	10 m platform	52.96	1 Q	28.62	4	81.58	3rd place, bronze medalist(s)
Juno Stover-Irwin	10 m platform	50.81	5 Q	30.83	2	81.64	2nd place, silver medalist(s)

== Equestrian ==
=== Dressage ===
Athlete	Horse	Event	Score	Rank
Robert Borg	Bill Biddle	Individual	720.0	17
Elaine Watt	Connecticut Yankee	Individual	568.0	30

=== Eventing ===
Athlete	Horse	Event	Dressage		Cross-country				Jumping			
Athlete	Horse	Event	Penalties	Rank	Faults	Time penalty	Total	Rank	Faults	Time penalty	Total	Rank
Jack Burton	Huntingfield	Individual	155.60	47	120.0	141.00	416.60	36 Q	DNS		DNF	
Frank Duffy	Drop Dead	Individual	162.40	50	EL				Did not advance			
Walter Staley	Mud Dauber	Individual	182.00	56	0.0	-47.43	134.57	10	EL			
Jack Burton; Frank Duffy; Walter Staley	See above	Team	500.00	17	EL				Did not advance			

=== Jumping ===
Athlete	Horse	Event	Round 1			Round 2			Total	
Athlete	Horse	Event	Faults	Time penalty	Total	Faults	Time penalty	Total	Penalties	Rank
Frank Chapot	Belair	Individual	35	1.25	36.25	16	0.0	16.0	52.25	27
William Steinkraus	Night Owl	Individual	20	0.0	20.0	8	0.0	8.0	28.0	15
Hugh Wiley	Trail Guide	Individual	16	0.0	16.0	8	0.0	8.0	24.0	11
Frank Chapot; William Steinkraus; Hugh Wiley	See above	Team	—N/a		72.25	—N/a		32.0	104.25	5

== Fencing ==
18 fencers represented the United States in 1956.

Individual
Men

Athlete	Event	Round 1		Barrage 1		Quarterfinal		Barrage 2		Semifinal		Barrage 3		Final		Medal barrage	
Athlete	Event	V–D	Rank	V–D	Rank	V–D	Rank	V–D	Rank	V–D	Rank	V–D	Rank	V–D	Rank	V–D	Rank
Albert Axelrod	Foil	—N/a				5–2	3 Q	Bye		1–5	7	Did not advance					
Harold Goldsmith	Foil	—N/a				3–4	5	—N/a		Did not advance							
Byron Krieger	Foil	—N/a				1–6	8	Did not advance									
Kinmont Hoitsma	Épée	3–3	4 Q	—N/a		2–4	6	—N/a		Did not advance							
Richard Pew	Épée	5–0	1 Q	—N/a		3–3	=2 B	2–0	1 Q	6–1	1 Q	Bye		4–3	4	Did not advance	
Sewall Shurtz	Épée	4–2	2 Q	—N/a		4–1	=1 Q	—N/a		2–5	7	Did not advance					
Allan Kwartler	Sabre	2–1	3 Q	—N/a		3–2	4 Q	—N/a		2–5	7	—N/a		Did not advance			
Tibor Nyilas	Sabre	5–0	1 Q	Bye		2–4	5	—N/a		Did not advance		—N/a		Did not advance			
George Worth	Sabre	3–1	3 Q	Bye		3–3	=3 B	1–1	1 Q	2–5	7	—N/a		Did not advance			

Women

Athlete	Event	Round 1		Semifinal		Final		Medal barrage	
Athlete	Event	V–D	Rank	V–D	Rank	V–D	Rank	V–D	Rank
Judy Goodrich	Foil	3–4	6	Did not advance					
Maxine Mitchell	Foil	5–1	1 Q	0–5	6	Did not advance			
Janice York-Romary	Foil	5–2	1 Q	3–2	2 Q	4–3	4	Did not advance	

Team

Athlete	Event	Round 1			Semifinal			Final			
Athlete	Event	Opposition result	Opposition result	Rank	Opposition result	Opposition result	Rank	Opposition result	Opposition result	Opposition result	Rank
Albert Axelrod; Daniel Bukantz; Harold Goldsmith; Byron Krieger; Nathaniel Lubell; Sewall Shurtz	Foil	Australia; W 13–3	Bye	1 Q	Great Britain; W 9–7	Italy; L 4–8	2 Q	France; L 6–10	Italy; L 7–9	Hungary; L 5–9	4
Abram Cohen; Ralph Goldstein; Kinmont Hoitsma; Richard Pew; Sewall Shurtz	Épée	Great Britain; L 7–9	Italy; L 8–8	3	Did not advance						
Norman Armitage; Abram Cohen; Rex Dyer; Allan Kwartler; Tibor Nyilas; George Worth	Sabre	Bye			Poland; L 6–10	Hungary; L 1–9	3	Did not advance			

== Field hockey ==
Summary

Team	Event	Preliminary round				Classification round				Semifinal	Final / BM	
Team	Event	Opposition Result	Opposition Result	Opposition Result	Rank	Opposition Result	Opposition Result	Opposition Result	Rank	Opposition Result	Opposition Result	Rank
United States men	Men's tournament	Singapore; L 1–6	India; L 0–16	Afghanistan; L 1–5	4	Kenya; L 0–3	Malaya; L 0–3	Afghanistan; T 1–1	4	Did not advance		12

Roster The following players represented the United States:

- Newbold Black
- Henry Clifford
- Stan Harris
- James Jongeneel
- Gerrit Kruize
- Tjerk Leegstra
- Harry Marcoplos
- Kurt Orban
- John Rote
- Walter Stude
- Felix Ucko
- Kurt Ucko
- Ray Wittelsberger

Preliminary round

Pos	Team	Pld	W	D	L	GF	GA	GD	Pts	Qualification
1	India	3	3	0	0	36	0	+36	6	Advanced to Semi-finals
2	Singapore	3	2	0	1	11	7	+4	4	
3	Afghanistan	3	1	0	2	5	20	−15	2	
4	United States	3	0	0	3	2	27	−25	0	

Source: LA84 Foundation
Rules for classification: 1) points.

26 November 1956
11:30

Singapore	6–1	United States
	Report

Umpires:
L. La Mothe (AUS)
R. Moyse (AUS)

28 November 1956
14:30

India	16–0	United States
	Report

Umpires:
Mahan Singh (KEN)
W. Scott (NZL)

30 November 1956
14:30

Afghanistan	5–1	United States
	Report

Umpires:
Alan Cowan (AUS)
R. Moyse (AUS)

9th-12th Classification

Pos	Team	Pld	W	D	L	GF	GA	GD	Pts
9	Malaya	3	3	0	0	14	2	+12	6
10	Kenya	3	2	0	1	14	3	+11	4
11	Afghanistan (Note: Afghanistan finished above the United States after beating them in Group A.)	3	0	1	2	1	7	−6	1
12	United States	3	0	1	2	1	18	−17	1

Source: Sports Reference
Notes:

3 December 1956

Kenya	3–0	United States

Olympic Park Stadium, Melbourne

4 December 1956

Malaya	3–0	United States

Olympic Park Stadium, Melbourne

6 December 1956

United States	1–1	Afghanistan

Olympic Park Stadium, Melbourne

== Football (soccer) ==
Summary

Team	Event	First round	Quarterfinal	Semifinal	Final / BM	
Team	Event	Opposition Result	Opposition Result	Opposition Result	Opposition Result	Rank
United States men	Men's tournament	Bye	Yugoslavia; L 1–9	Did not advance		

Roster

Head coach: Jimmy Mills

No.	Pos.	Player	DoB	Age	Caps	Club	Tournament games	Tournament goals	Minutes played	Sub off	Sub on	Cards yellow/red
1	MF	John Carden			0	(United States) Armed Forces Service Team	0	0	0	0	0	0
2	GK	Ronald Coder	1929	0	0	(United States) Armed Forces Service Team	0	0	0	0	0	0
3	MF	Bill Conterio	November 29, 1929	27	0	(United States) Chicago Falcons	1	0	90	0	0	0
4	MF	Jim Dorrian	March 6, 1931	25	0	(United States) Danish F.C.	1	0	90	0	0	0
5	GK	Svend Engedal	June 23, 1928	28	0	(United States) Danish-American SC	1	0	90	0	0	0
6	DF	Harry Keough	November 15, 1927	28	13	(United States) St. Louis Kutis S.C.	1	0	90	0	0	0
7	FW	William Looby	November 11, 1931	25	5	(United States) St. Louis Kutis S.C.	1	0	90	0	0	0
8	DF	Alfonso Marina			0	(United States) Brooklyn Hispano	0	0	0	0	0	0
9	FW	Ruben Mendoza	June 2, 1931	25	1	(United States) St. Louis Kutis S.C.	1	0	90	0	0	0
10	FW	Lloyd Monsen	May 7, 1931	25	2	(United States) New York Hakoah-Americans	1	0	90	0	0	0
11	FW	Ed Murphy	November 6, 1930	26	1	(United States) Chicago Falcons	1	0	90	0	0	0
12	FW	Dick Packer			0	(United States) Uhrik Truckers	0	0	0	0	0	0
13	DF	Zenon Snylyk	November 14, 1933	23	0	(United States) Chicago Levy	1	0	90	0	0	0
14	DF	Herman Wecke	March 10, 1927	29	3	(United States) St. Louis Kutis S.C.	1	0	90	0	0	0
15	DF	Siegbert Wirth			0	(United States) Armed Forces Service Team	0	0	0	0	0	0
16	MF	Al Zerhusen	December 4, 1931	25	0	(United States) Kolping SC	1	1	90	0	0	0

Quarterfinal

28 November 1956
16:30 AEST (UTC+10)

Yugoslavia	9–1	United States
Veselinović 10', 84', 90'; Antić 12', 73'; Mujić 16', 35', 56'; Papec 20'	Report	Zerhusen 42'

Olympic Park Stadium, Melbourne
Attendance: 5,292
Referee: Maurice Swain (New Zealand)

== Gymnastics ==
Men

Athlete	Event	Apparatus																								Total	
Athlete	Event	Floor exercise				Rings				Pommel horse				Vault				Parallel bars				Horizontal bar				Total	
Athlete	Event	C	V	Total	Rank	C	V	Total	Rank	C	V	Total	Rank	C	V	Total	Rank	C	V	Total	Rank	C	V	Total	Rank	Score	Rank
Dick Beckner	Individual	8.85	9.05	17.90	=41	9.35	9.30	18.65	17	8.70	8.80	17.50	47	8.85	9.20	18.05	=43	8.55	9.20	17.75	47	9.10	9.35	18.45	=29	108.30	35
Jack Beckner	Individual	9.25	9.25	18.50	=16	8.70	9.05	17.75	31	9.30	9.10	18.40	25	9.25	9.35	18.60	=7	9.40	9.35	18.75	15	9.40	9.60	19.00	7	111.00	17
Abie Grossfeld	Individual	9.10	9.30	18.40	=23	9.20	~~8.30~~	17.50	=34	8.65	~~8.65~~	17.30	=51	~~8.85~~	~~9.10~~	17.95	=47	8.75	~~9.10~~	17.85	=43	9.35	9.40	18.75	=13	107.75	39
Charles Simms	Individual	~~8.55~~	~~8.70~~	17.25	50	8.70	8.80	17.50	=34	9.35	8.80	18.15	=30	9.15	9.30	18.45	=19	9.10	9.30	18.40	=28	9.20	9.45	18.65	=22	108.40	=32
Bill Tom	Individual	9.00	9.20	18.20	=29	~~8.10~~	8.75	16.85	=42	8.60	9.15	17.75	44	9.10	9.25	18.35	=28	9.05	9.30	18.35	=31	~~8.80~~	9.05	17.85	46	107.35	43
Armando Vega	Individual	9.20	9.40	18.60	15	9.05	9.40	18.45	=20	~~8.60~~	8.75	17.35	50	9.10	9.30	18.40	=23	~~8.10~~	9.50	17.60	51	9.15	~~8.90~~	18.05	=40	108.45	31
Total	Team	45.40	46.20	—N/a		45.00	45.30	—N/a		44.60	44.60	—N/a		45.45	46.40	—N/a		44.85	46.65	—N/a		46.20	46.85	—N/a		547.50	6

Women

Athlete	Event	Apparatus																		Total	
Athlete	Event	Floor exercise				Balance beam				Uneven bars				Vault				Portable apparatus		Total	
Athlete	Event	C	V	Total	Rank	C	V	Total	Rank	C	V	Total	Rank	C	V	Total	Rank	Score	Rank	Score	Rank
Muriel Davis	Individual	9.100	9.033	18.133	=25	8.633	8.966	17.600	32	8.533	~~7.700~~	16.233	59	8.633	8.333	16.966	58	—N/a		68.933	52
Doris Fuchs	Individual	8.966	8.833	17.800	=44	~~8.300~~	~~6.633~~	14.933	63	8.500	8.500	17.000	=52	8.966	9.033	18.000	=35	—N/a		67.733	57
Judy Howe	Individual	~~8.733~~	~~8.333~~	17.066	60	8.466	8.400	16.866	=52	8.500	8.500	17.000	=52	~~8.600~~	~~7.666~~	16.266	59	—N/a		67.200	58
Jackie Klein	Individual	8.900	8.533	17.433	=57	8.366	8.733	17.100	49	~~8.233~~	8.233	16.466	56	8.633	8.666	17.300	57	—N/a		68.300	55
Joyce Racek	Individual	8.766	9.066	17.833	=42	8.600	7.733	16.333	58	8.266	8.033	16.300	57	8.900	9.133	18.033	=32	—N/a		68.500	54
Sandra Ruddick	Individual	9.100	8.433	17.533	=53	8.333	8.133	16.466	55	8.800	8.533	17.333	=46	8.933	8.866	17.800	=46	—N/a		69.133	51
Total	Team	44.832	43.898	—N/a		42.398	41.965	—N/a		42.599	41.799	—N/a		44.065	44.031	—N/a		67.60	9	413.20	9

== Modern pentathlon ==
Three pentathletes represented the United States in 1956, winning silver in the team event.

Athlete	Event	Riding (Show jumping)				Fencing (Épée one-touch)			Shooting (Rapid fire pistol)			Swimming (300 m freestyle)			Running (4000 m cross-country)			Total	
Athlete	Event	Time	Faults	Rank	MP points	Wins	Rank	MP points	Score	Rank	MP points	Time	Rank	MP points	Time	Rank	MP points	Points	Rank
William Andre	Individual	9:57	120	8	887.5	23	4	889	188	8	860	4:26.2	17	870	14:19.2	11	1123	4629.5	7
Jack Daniels	Individual	9:35	0	2	1062.5	9	36	371	185	13	800	4:13.3	11	935	15:30.4	25	910	4078.5	13
George Lambert	Individual	9:32	0	1	1070.0	17	17	667	190	4	900	4:05.8	7	975	14:33.2	15	1081	4693.0	5
William Andre; Jack Daniels; George Lambert	Team	—N/a			3020.0	—N/a		2008	—N/a		2560	—N/a		2780	—N/a		3114	13482.0	2nd place, silver medalist(s)

== Rowing ==
The United States had 26 rowers participate in all seven rowing events in 1956.

Athlete	Event	Heat		Repechage		Semifinal		Final	
Athlete	Event	Time	Rank	Time	Rank	Time	Rank	Time	Rank
Jack Kelly Jr.	Single sculls	7:24.8	1 SF	Bye		9:12.5	1 F	8:11.8	3rd place, bronze medalist(s)
James Fifer; Duvall Hecht	Coxless pair	7:19.5	1 SF	Bye		8:37.7	1 F	7:55.4	1st place, gold medalist(s)
Dan Ayrault; Conn Findlay; Kurt Seiffert (c)	Coxed pair	7:42.8	1 SF	Bye		9:25.1	2 F	8:26.1	1st place, gold medalist(s)
Pat Costello; Jim Gardiner	Double sculls	6:54.5	1 F	Bye		—N/a		7:32.2	2nd place, silver medalist(s)
James McIntosh; Art McKinlay; John McKinlay; John Welchli	Coxless four					—N/a			2nd place, silver medalist(s)
Ronald Cardwell; Edward Masterson (c); James McMullen; Douglas Turner; James Wynne	Coxed four	7:01.8	1 SF	Bye		8:24.3	4	Did not advance	
William Becklean (c); Donald Beer; Thomas Charlton; John Cooke; Caldwell Esselstyn; Charles Grimes; Robert Morey; Rusty Wailes; David Wight	Eight	6:09.1	3 R	7:09.9	1 SF	6:55.1	1 F	6:35.2	1st place, gold medalist(s)

== Sailing ==
Athlete	Event	Race 1		Race 2		Race 3		Race 4		Race 5		Race 6		Race 7		Total	
Athlete	Event	Rank	Points	Rank	Points	Rank	Points	Rank	Points	Rank	Points	Rank	Points	Rank	Points	Points	Rank
John Marvin	Finn	2	1101	2	1101	~~8~~	~~499~~	3	925	3	925	2	1101	4	800	5953	3rd place, bronze medalist(s)
Eric Olsen; Stan Renehan	12 m^{2} Sharpie	~~DNF~~	~~0~~	5	516	DNF	0	5	516	7	370	10	215	8	312	1929	9
Lawrence Low; Herbert Williams	Star	1	1180	~~5~~	~~481~~	2	879	1	1180	2	879	2	879	2	879	5876	1st place, gold medalist(s)
Carlos Echeverria; Danny Killeen; Gene Walet Jr. Gene Walet III	Dragon	~~DNF~~	~~0~~	11	264	11	264	6	527	1	1305	6	527	11	264	3151	9
John Bryant; Andy Schoettle; Victor Sheronas; Robert Stinson	5.5 Meter	2	800	3	624	3	624	2	800	6	323	2	800	~~8~~	~~198~~	3971	4

== Shooting ==
Eight shooters represented the United States in 1956. Offutt Pinion won the bronze medal in the 50 m pistol event.

Athlete	Event	Score	Rank
John Beaumont	25 m rapid fire pistol	572	9
John Forman	25 m rapid fire pistol	566	13
Huelet Benner	50 m pistol	537	11
Offutt Pinion	50 m pistol	551	3rd place, bronze medalist(s)
Arthur Jackson	50 m rifle, prone	593	31
Verle Wright Jr.	50 m rifle, prone	590	36
Arthur Jackson	50 m rifle, three position	1153	12
Verle Wright Jr.	50 m rifle, three position	1151	14
James Smith	300 m rifle, three position	1082	8
Herbert Voelcker	300 m rifle, three position	1075	10

== Swimming ==
Men

Athlete	Event	Heat		Semifinal		Final	
Athlete	Event	Time	Rank	Time	Rank	Time	Rank
Dick Hanley	100 m freestyle	57.8	6 Q	56.9	=3 Q	57.6	5
Reid Patterson	100 m freestyle	56.8 OR	1 Q	57.1	5 Q	57.2	4
Bill Woolsey	100 m freestyle	58.2	9 Q	58.0	=7 Q	57.6	6
George Breen	400 m freestyle	4:35.7	=5 Q	—N/a		4:32.5	3rd place, bronze medalist(s)
George Onekea	400 m freestyle	4:41.6	14	—N/a		Did not advance	
Bill Woolsey	400 m freestyle	4:38.2	10	—N/a		Did not advance	
George Breen	1500 m freestyle	17:52.9	1 Q	—N/a		18:08.2	3rd place, bronze medalist(s)
George Onekea	1500 m freestyle	19:13.8	13	—N/a		Did not advance	
David Radcliff	1500 m freestyle	19:09.6	11	—N/a		Did not advance	
Frank McKinney	100 m backstroke	1:06.0	6 Q	1:05.3	6 Q	1:04.5	3rd place, bronze medalist(s)
Yoshi Oyakawa	100 m backstroke	1:05.2	5 Q	1:05.0	=5 Q	1:06.9	8
Albert Wiggins	100 m backstroke	1:06.2	=9 Q	1:06.4	7 Q	1:05.8	7
Robert Hughes	200 m breaststroke	2:52.2	14	—N/a		Did not advance	
Jack Nelson	200 m butterfly	2:29.4	7 Q	—N/a		2:26.6	4
William Yorzyk	200 m butterfly	2:18.6	1 Q	—N/a		2:19.3	1st place, gold medalist(s)
George Breen; Dick Hanley; Tim Jecko^{[b]} Ford Konno; Sonny Tanabe^{[b]} Bill Woolsey	4 × 200 m freestyle relay	8:38.3	2 Q	—N/a		8:31.5	2nd place, silver medalist(s)

Women

Athlete	Event	Heat		Semifinal		Final	
Athlete	Event	Time	Rank	Time	Rank	Time	Rank
Shelley Mann	100 me freestyle	1:05.4	6 Q	1:05.5	6 Q	1:05.6	6
Joan Rosazza	100 me freestyle	1:05.5	7 Q	1:05.9	7 Q	1:05.2	4
Nancy Simons	100 me freestyle	1:06.5	=9 Q	1:06.1	9	Did not advance	
Susan Gray	400 m freestyle	5:16.7	9	—N/a		Did not advance	
Sylvia Ruuska	400 m freestyle	5:10.3	5 Q	—N/a		5:07.1	3rd place, bronze medalist(s)
Marley Shriver	400 m freestyle	5:07.6	3 Q	—N/a		5:12.9	4
Carin Cone	100 m backstroke	1:13.9	3 Q	—N/a		1:13.1	2nd place, silver medalist(s)
Mary Anne Marchino	100 m backstroke	1:16.2	=15	—N/a		Did not advance	
Maureen Murphy	100 m backstroke	1:14.8	=7 Q	—N/a		1:14.1	5
Mary Sears	200 m breaststroke	2:58.2	=7 Q	—N/a		2:57.2	7
Shelley Mann	100 m butterfly	1:11.2	1 Q	—N/a		1:11.0 OR	1st place, gold medalist(s)
Nancy Ramey	100 m butterfly	1:13.4	2 Q	—N/a		1:11.9	2nd place, silver medalist(s)
Mary Sears	100 m butterfly	1:15.1	4 Q	—N/a		1:14.4	3rd place, bronze medalist(s)
Betty Brey^{[b]} Kay Knapp^{[b]} Shelley Mann; Joan Rosazza; Sylvia Ruuska; Marley Shriver^{[b]} Nancy Simons	4 × 100 m freestyle relay	4:27.3	3 Q	—N/a		4:19.2	2nd place, silver medalist(s)

^{b} Swimmers who participated in the heats only.

== Water polo ==
Summary

Team	Event	Preliminary round			Final round				
Team	Event	Opposition Result	Opposition Result	Rank	Opposition Result	Opposition Result	Opposition Result	Opposition Result	Rank
United States men	Men's tournament	Great Britain; W 5–3	Hungary; L 2–6	2 Q	Yugoslavia; L 1–5	United Team of Germany; W 4–3	Italy; L 2–3	Soviet Union; L 1–3	5

Roster
The United States entered a squad of eleven players. They scored 15 goals but only three scorers are known.

Head coach: Neill Kohlhase (coach), Sam Greller (manager)

No.	Pos.	Player	DoB	Age	Caps	Club	Tournament games	Tournament goals
		Robert Frojen	1 December 1930	25	?	(United States) Southern California Water Polo Club	6	?
		James Gaughran	5 July 1932	24	?	(United States) Southern California Water Polo Club	2	?
		Donald Good			?		0	0
	GK	Kenneth Hahn	5 June 1928	28	?	(United States) Illinois Athletic Club	1	?
	GK	Robert Horn	1 November 1931	27	?	(United States) Southern California Water Polo Club	5	?
		Robert Hughes	15 December 1930	25	?	(United States) University of Southern California	5	?
		William Kooistra	26 August 1926	30	?	(United States) Illinois Athletic Club	5	1
		Sam Kooistra	18 August 1935	21	?	(United States) Northwestern University	4	1
		William Ross	6 July 1928	28	?	(United States) Southern California Water Polo Club	6	1
		Ronald Severa	13 August 1936	20	?	(United States) Lynwood Swim Club	3	?
		Wally Wolf	2 October 1930	26	?	(United States) Lynwood Swim Club	5	?

== Weightlifting ==
Athlete	Event	Press		Snatch		Clean & Jerk		Total	
Athlete	Event	Weight	Rank	Weight	Rank	Weight	Rank	Weight	Rank
Charles Vinci	56 kg	105	=1	105	=1	132.5	2	342.5 WR	1st place, gold medalist(s)
Issac Berger	60 kg	107.5	2	107.5 OR	1	137.5 OR	1	352.5 WR	1st place, gold medalist(s)
Pete George	75 kg	122.5	=3	127.5	1	162.5	2	412.5	2nd place, silver medalist(s)
Jim George	82.5 kg	120	=7	130	=2	167.5	2	417.5	3rd place, bronze medalist(s)
Tommy Kono	82.5 kg	140 OR	1	132.5 OR	1	175 WR	1	447.5 WR	1st place, gold medalist(s)
Dave Sheppard	90 kg	140	=2	137.5	=1	165	3	442.5	2nd place, silver medalist(s)
Paul Anderson	+90 kg	167.5	2	145	1	187.5 OR	1	500 OR	1st place, gold medalist(s)

== Wrestling ==
Key:

- TF – Victory by fall.
- WO - Win by Walkover
- PP - Win by decision

Athlete	Event	Elimination stage						Final stage			
Athlete	Event	Opposition Result (Penalty points)	Opposition Result (Penalty points)	Opposition Result (Penalty points)	Opposition Result (Penalty points)	Opposition Result (Penalty points)	TPP	Opposition Result (Penalty points)	Opposition Result (Penalty points)	FPP	Rank
Dick Delgado	Freestyle flyweight	Tsalkalamanidze (URS); L 0–3 PP (3)	Bye	Khojastehpour (IRN); L 0–3 PP (3)	EL	—N/a	6	—N/a	EL		=5
Lee Allen	Freestyle bantamweight	Jaskari (FIN); L 0–3 PP (3)	Dağıstanlı (TUR); L TF (3)	EL			6	—N/a		EL	=11
Myron Roderick	Freestyle featherweight	Galántai (HUN); W 3–0 PP (1)	Elliott (AUS); W TF (0)	Geldenhuys (RSA); W 3–0 PP (1)	Sasahara (JPN); L 0–3 PP (3)	—N/a	5	EL			=4
Jay Thomas Evans	Freestyle lightweight	Taylor (GBR); W TF (0)	Kasahara (JPN); W 3–0 PP (1)	Tovar (MEX); W 3–0 PP (1)	Tóth (HUN); L 0–3 PP (3)	EL	5	—N/a	EL		=5
Jay Thomas Evans	Greco-Roman lightweight	Lehtonen (FIN); L TF (3)	Stoyanov (BUL); L 0–3 PP (3)	EL			6	EL			=7
Ernie Fischer	Freestyle welterweight	Ikeda (JPN); L 0–3 PP (3)	Sorouri (IRN); W 3–0 PP (1)	Zengin (TUR); L 0–3 PP (3)	EL	—N/a	7	—N/a	EL		=9
Danny Hodge	Freestyle middleweight	Farquhar (GBR); W TF (0)	Punkari (FIN); W 3–0 PP (1)	Davies (AUS); W TF (0)	Zandi (IRN); W TF (0)	Stanchev (BUL); L TF (3)	4	—N/a	Skhirtladze (URS); W TF (0)	3	2nd place, silver medalist(s)
Peter Blair	Freestyle light heavyweight	Lahti (FIN); W TF (0)	Palm (SWE); L 0–3 PP (3)	Theron (RSA); W TF (0)	Atan (TUR); W 3–0 PP (1)	—N/a	4	Kulaev (URS); L TF (3)	Takhti (IRN); L 0–3 PP (3)	6	3rd place, bronze medalist(s)
William Kerslake	Freestyle heavyweight	Kaplan (TUR); L 1–2 PP (3)	Mitchell (AUS); W TF (0)	Richmond (GBR); L TF (3)	EL	—N/a	6	EL			=7
Dick Wilson	Greco-Roman flyweight	Zoete (FRA); W 3–0 PP (1)	Fabra (ITA); L 0–3 PP (3)	Eğribaş (TUR); L TF (3)	EL	—N/a	7	—N/a	EL		9
Kent Townley	Greco-Roman bantamweight	Bye	Hódos (HUN); L 0–3 PP (3)	Kämmerer (EUA); L 0–3 PP (3)	EL	—N/a	6	EL			8
Alan Rice	Greco-Roman featherweight	Popescu (ROU); L 0–3 PP (3)	Polyák (HUN); L 0–3 PP (3)	EL		—N/a	6	EL			=8
Jay Holt	Greco-Roman welterweight	Bye	Szilvásy (HUN); L 0–3 PP (3)	Bayrak (TUR); L 0–3 PP (3)	EL	—N/a	6	EL			=5
Jim Peckham	Greco-Roman middleweight	Gurics (HUN); L 1–2 PP (3)	Sterr (EUA); W 2–1 PP (1)	Jansson (SWE); L 1–2 PP (3)	EL	—N/a	7	—N/a	EL		7
Dale O. Thomas	Greco-Roman light heavyweight	Wiesberger Jr. (AUT); W TF (0)	Lahti (FIN); L TF (3)	Sirakov (BUL); L TF (3)	EL	—N/a	6	—N/a	EL		5
Dale Lewis	Greco-Roman heavyweight	Antonsson (SWE); L TF (3)	Kangasniemi (FIN); L TF (3)	EL		—N/a	6	EL			=9

== See also ==
- United States at the 1955 Pan American Games
