= 1956 United States men's Olympic basketball team =

- Head coach: Gerry Tucker
- Scoring leader: (United States) Bill Russell (14.1)

The 1956 United States men's Olympic basketball team competed in the 1956 Summer Olympics in Melbourne, Australia, from November 22 to December 1, 1956. The team was led by 22-year-old Bill Russell, who averaged 14.1 points per game. Team USA won the Olympic Gold medal, beating their opponents by an average of 53.5 points, an unsurpassed average margin of victory in Olympic basketball.

== Roster ==
	Position	Height	Weight	Age	Hometown	Team
Dick Boushka	Forward	6'5"	195	22	Springfield, Illinois	Wichita Vickers (Saint Louis)
Carl Cain	Forward	6'3"	190	22	Freeport, Illinois	University of Iowa Hawkeyes
Charles Darling	Center	6'8"	225	26	Denver, Colorado	Phillips 66ers (Iowa)
William Evans	Guard	6'1"	185	24	Berea, Kentucky	U.S. Armed Forces (Kentucky)
Gilbert Ford	Guard	6'4"	200	25	Amarillo, Texas	U.S. Armed Forces (Texas)
Burdette Haldorson	Forward	6'7"	207	22	Austin, Minnesota	Phillips 66ers (Colorado)
Bill Hougland	Forward	6'5"	190	26	Beloit, Kansas	Phillips 66ers (Kansas)
Robert Jeangerard	Forward	6'3"	190	23	Winnetka, Illinois	Phillips 66ers (Colorado)
K. C. Jones	Guard	6'1"	201	24	San Francisco, California	University of San Francisco
Bill Russell	Center	6'10"	220	22	Oakland, California	University of San Francisco
Ron Tomsic	Guard	5'11"	185	23	Oakland, California	U.S. Armed Forces (Stanford)
Jim Walsh	Guard	6'4"	190	26	San Francisco, California	Phillips 66ers (Stanford)

== 1956 USA results ==
- United States beat Japan, 98–40
- United States beat Thailand, 101–29
- United States beat Philippines, 121–53
- United States beat Bulgaria, 85–44
- United States beat Brazil, 113–51
- United States beat Soviet Union, 85–55
- United States beat Uruguay, 101–38
- United States beat Soviet Union, 89–55
- USA record was 8–0

== Stats ==
	Games	FGM-FGA	Pct (field goals)	FTM-FTA	Pct (free throws)	Pts/Avg
Dick Boushka	8	27–68	.397	10–10	1.000	64/8.0
Carl Cain	2	1–5	.200	1–2	.500	3/1.5
Charles Darling	8	22–44	.500	12–15	.800	56/9.3
William Evans	8	21–55	.382	12–18	.667	54/6.8
Gilbert Ford	8	17–44	.386	5–7	.714	39/4.9
Burdette Haldorson	8	28–58	.483	13–15	.867	69/8.6
Bill Hougland	8	20–51	.392	6–6	1.000	46/5.8
Robert Jeangerard	8	45–74	.608	10–11	.909	100/12.5
K. C. Jones	8	32–75	.427	23–27	.852	87/10.9
Bill Russell	8	46–96	.479	21–27	.778	113/14.1
Ron Tomsic	8	34–92	.370	21–25	.840	89/11.1
Jim Walsh	9	27–61	.443	19–21	.905	73/9.1

== 1956 Olympic Games final standings ==
- 1. United States (8–0)
- 2. Soviet Union (5–3)
- 3. Uruguay (6–2)
- 4. France (5–3)
- 5. Bulgaria (5–3)
- 6. Brazil (3–4)
- 7. Philippines (4–4)
- 8. Chile (2–5)
- 9. Canada (5–2)
- 10. Japan (3–4)
- 11. Formosa (5–3)
- 12. Australia (2–5)
- 13. Singapore (2–5)
- 14. South Korea (1–6)
- 15. Thailand (0–7)

== See also ==
- Basketball at the 1956 Summer Olympics
