= Kenneth Hahn (water polo) =

American water polo player (1928–2006)

- Hahn in mid to late 20's, from Water Polo Legends

Personal information
- Full name: Kenneth Alvin Hahn
- Born: June 5, 1928 Chicago, Illinois, United States
- Died: August 2, 2006 (aged 78) Durham, North Carolina, United States
- Height: 183 cm (6 ft 0 in)
- Weight: 79 kg (174 lb)
- Spouse: Sheila Musgrove Hahn

Sport
- Sport: Water polo
- Club: Illinois Athletic Club
- Coached by: Bill Bachrach, Sam Greller (IAC); Neil Kohlhase, Urho Saari (Olympics)
Medal record
Representing United States
Pan American Games
Gold medal – first place	1959 Chicago	Men's tournament

Kenneth Alvin Hahn (June 5, 1928 – August 2, 2006) was an American water polo player who graduated DePaul University and competed in the 1956 Summer Olympics in Melbourne where the U.S. team placed fifth overall.

Hahn was born June 5, 1928, in Chicago, Illinois to father Alvin Hahn and mother Ethel Johnson Hahn. For a large portion of his career, from around 1950–1960, after graduating high school, and likely completing college, he competed and trained with the Illinois Athletic Club, where he was mentored and directed in water polo and swimming first by IAC Coach William Bachrach, and then by Coach Sam Greller, both USA Water Polo Hall of Fame inductees.

Hahn may have graduated junior high as an eighth grader from Bloomington, Illinois's Lincoln High School on June 14, 1941, among 184 fellow students and graduated as a senior in 1945. There is no clear indication that he attended high school closer to Chicago, where he was born.

== DePaul University ==
Though they had no varsity water polo team, Hahn graduated Chicago's DePaul University, as had fellow 1956 Olympic water polo teammate William Kooistra who served as captain. There is a source that states that Hahn may have briefly played Varsity basketball while attending the university and later played for the all-star pro team, The Mount Vernon Starr Brother Independent basketeers in 1953, though he may have only played a few games with the team.

In water polo competition, in 1955 and 1958, Hahn was in Sr. National AAU Outdoor national championship teams and in indoor competition was on AAU Championship teams in 1960, 1959, 1956, 1955, and 1954.

Hahn served as an alternate on the U.S. 1952 Olympic water polo team.

== 1956 Melbourne Olympics ==
Hahn was a member of the American water polo team which finished fifth in the 1956 Olympic water polo tournament. He played one match as goalkeeper as part of the U.S. Olympic team under Head Olympic Coach Neal Kohlhase, Assistant Coach Urho Saari and manager Sam Greller, all Water Polo Hall of Fame members. Hungary took the gold, Yugoslavia took the silver, and the Russian team captured the bronze. A well-publicized feature of the tournament was a very rough match between pre-Olympic favorite Hungary and Russia that had to be stopped by the referees. On December 6, the Hungarian team won their match against Hungary by a score of 4–0, and went undefeated in the tournament, but considerable animosity existed between the Russian and Hungarian teams as a result of the recent Russian occupation of Hungary in November, 1956, subsequent to a student revolt in the same month. Playing for the U.S. team were Olympic water polo Captain William Kooistra, and his brother Sam Kooistra, both graduates of DePaul University. Future UCLA and Olympic Water Polo Coach Bob Horn, who had played for Long Beach State, shared responsibilities as goaltender with Hahn.

=== 1959 Chicago Pan Am gold ===
In the try-outs for the 1959 Chicago Pan American, games, Hahn played for the Illinois Athletic Club (IAC) under Coach Sam Greller. Winning the right to represent the American team at the PanAm Games, the IAC team defeated the Lynwood Swim Club in a close 6–5 match at the Riis Park Pool on August 9, 1959, though the IAC fell behind 4–2 in the second half of play. The American team would win the gold at the Chicago Pan Ams held in late August and early September. In a preliminary game against Argentina, at the 1959 Pan Ams, the U.S. team won 5–3 at Chicago's Portage Park on September 3, 1959, scoring three of their five goals in the early portion of the second half. Hahn played an outstanding game defending the goal as goalkeeper.

In late June, Hahn was selected to attend the 1960 Olympic trials on the West Coast, for which he trained at Chicago's Portage Park under IAC acting Coach Harold Dash. Also chosen to attend the trials representing the IAC were former Olympian Sam Kooistra, as well as Art Koblish, and John and George Kastner.

Hahn was married to Shiela Musgrove Hahn.

=== Career ===
In career pursuits, he worked in sales, later relocating to Rock Falls, Illinois.

Around 2003, he moved to Durham, North Carolina. Hahn died August 2, 2006, at the age of 78 in Durham, North Carolina. He was survived by his children, two boys and two girls, and grandchildren but was predeceased in 1999 by his wife Sheila Musgrove with whom he was buried. A memorial service was held at Hall-Wynne Funeral Home, and he was later buried at Oak Knoll Cemetery in Sterling on August 12.

== Honors ==
In 1982, he was inducted into the USA Water Polo Hall of Fame. Later in 1986, he became a member of the Illinois Water Polo Hall of Fame. Hahn was the recipient of All American honors by the American Athletic Union in the years 1953, 1954, 1959, 1956, and 1958.

== See also ==
- List of men's Olympic water polo tournament goalkeepers
