= William Farrell =

William Farrell may refer to:

- William Farrell (architect) (died 1851), Irish architect
- William Farrell (diver) (born 1934), American Olympic diver
- William Farrell, Irish-Canadian businessman and a founder of the British Columbia Telephone Company
- Willie Farrell (1928–2010), Irish politician
- Bill Farrell (baseball), baseball player
- Bill Farrell (singer) (1926–2007), American singer in the 1940s–1950s
- Billy Farrell (footballer), League of Ireland player

== See also ==
- William Farrell-Skeffington (1742–1815), British soldier
