= Diving at the 1956 Summer Olympics – Men's 10 metre platform =

Men's 10 metre platform at the Games of the XVI Olympiad

Medalists
1st place, gold medalist(s)		Joaquín Capilla	Mexico
2nd place, silver medalist(s)		Gary Tobian	United States
3rd place, bronze medalist(s)		Richard Connor	United States

The men's 10 metre platform, also reported as high diving, was one of four diving events on the Diving at the 1956 Summer Olympics programme.

The competition was split into two phases held on different days:

- Preliminary round (5 December) – Divers performed six voluntary dives of limited degrees of difficulty. The twelve divers with the highest scores advanced to the final.
- Final (6 December) – Divers performed four voluntary dives without any limits of difficulty. The final score was the aggregate of the preliminary and final rounds' points.

== Results ==
Rank	Diver	Nation	Preliminary		Final		
Rank	Diver	Nation	Points	Rank	Points	Rank	Total
1st place, gold medalist(s)	Joaquín Capilla	Mexico	78.68	2	73.76	2	152.44
2nd place, silver medalist(s)	Gary Tobian	United States	76.77	4	75.64	1	152.41
3rd place, bronze medalist(s)	Richard Connor	United States	80.24	1	69.55	4	149.79
4	József Gerlach	Hungary	77.77	3	71.48	3	149.25
5	Roman Brener	Soviet Union	76.56	5	66.39	5	142.95
6	William Farrell	United States	75.07	6	64.05	7	139.12
7	Ferenc Siák	Hungary	72.85	9	65.98	6	138.83
8	Mikhail Chachba	Soviet Union	73.02	8	61.50	8	134.52
9	Alberto Capilla	Mexico	74.18	7	58.56	9	132.74
10	Juan Botella	Mexico	69.39	12	56.06	10	125.45
11	Yutaka Baba	Japan	70.76	10	52.93	11	123.69
12	Ryo Mabuchi	Japan	69.76	11	50.44	12	120.20
13	Gennady Galkin	Soviet Union	68.92	13	did not advance		
14	Peter Tarsey	Great Britain	68.34	14	did not advance		
15	William Patrick	Canada	67.71	15	did not advance		
16	Helge Vasenius	Finland	66.63	16	did not advance		
17	Francis Murphy	Australia	66.29	17	did not advance		
18	William Tully	Australia	65.49	18	did not advance		
19	Günther Mund Borgs	Chile	63.01	19	did not advance		
20	Roy Walsh	Great Britain	62.56	20	did not advance		
21	Ray Cann	Great Britain	60.08	21	did not advance		
22	Barry Holmes	Australia	58.01	22	did not advance		

== Sources ==
- The Organizing Committee of the XV Olympiad, Melbourne, 1956 (1958). "The Official Report of the Organizing Committee of the XVI Olympiad Melbourne 1956" (PDF). The Organizing Committee of the XV Olympiad, Melbourne, 1956. pp. p. 609. Archived from the original (PDF) on 12 September 2008.
- Herman de Wael (26 January 2001). "Diving - men's platform (Melbourne 1956)".
