= Weightlifting at the 1956 Summer Olympics – Men's 82.5 kg =

Weightlifting at the Olympics

Men's 82.5 kg at the Games of the XVI Olympiad
- Venue: Royal Exhibition Building
- Date: 26 November 1956
- Competitors: 10 from 9 nations
- Winning total: 447.5 kg WR

Medalists
1st place, gold medalist(s)		Tommy Kono	United States
2nd place, silver medalist(s)		Vasilijs Stepanovs	Soviet Union
3rd place, bronze medalist(s)		Jim George	United States

The men's 82.5 kg weightlifting competitions at the 1956 Summer Olympics in Melbourne took place on 26 November at the Royal Exhibition Building. It was the eighth appearance of the light heavyweight class.

== Competition format ==
Each weightlifter had three attempts at each of the three lifts. The best score for each lift was summed to give a total. The weightlifter could increase the weight between attempts (minimum of 5 kg between first and second attempts, 2.5 kg between second and third attempts) but could not decrease weight. If two or more weightlifters finished with the same total, the competitors' body weights were used as the tie-breaker (lighter athlete wins).

== Records ==
Prior to this competition, the existing world and Olympic records were as follows.

World record	Press	Tommy Kono (USA)	144 kg		1956
World record	Snatch	Arkady Vorobyov (URS)	136 kg		1953
World record	Clean & Jerk	Trofim Lomakin (URS)	173 kg		1955
World record	Total	Tommy Kono (USA)	435 kg	Vienna, Austria	9 October 1954
Olympic record	Press	Stanley Stanczyk (USA)	130 kg	London, United Kingdom	11 August 1948
Olympic record	Snatch	Stanley Stanczyk (USA)	130 kg	London, United Kingdom	11 August 1948
Olympic record	Clean & Jerk	Trofim Lomakin (URS)	165 kg	Helsinki, Finland	27 July 1952
Olympic record	Total	Stanley Stanczyk (USA); Trofim Lomakin (URS)	417.5 kg	London, United Kingdom; Helsinki, Finland	11 August 1948; 27 July 1952

== Results ==
Rank	Athlete	Nation	Body weight	Press (kg)				Snatch (kg)				Clean & Jerk (kg)				Total
Rank	Athlete	Nation	Body weight	1	2	3	Result	1	2	3	Result	1	2	3	Result	Total
1st place, gold medalist(s)	Tommy Kono	United States	80.90	135	140	~~142.5~~	140 OR	125	130	132.5	132.5 OR	160	167.5	175	175 WR	447.5 WR
2nd place, silver medalist(s)	Vasilijs Stepanovs	Soviet Union	82.20	130	135	~~137.5~~	135	130	~~135~~	~~135~~	130	157.5	~~162.5~~	162.5	162.5	427.5
3rd place, bronze medalist(s)	Jim George	United States	81.30	120	~~125~~	~~125~~	120	125	130	~~135~~	130	160	~~167.5~~	167.5	167.5	417.5
4	Jalal Mansouri	Iran	82.50	~~125~~	130	132.5	132.5	117.5	~~122.5~~	122.5	122.5	155	~~160~~	162.5	162.5	417.5
5	Phil Caira	Great Britain	81.50	122.5	127.5	~~132.5~~	127.5	112.5	117.5	122.5	122.5	145	150	155	155	405
6	Václav Pšenička, Jr.	Czechoslovakia	82.10	120	125	~~127.5~~	125	112.5	117.5	120	120	150	155	~~160~~	155	400
7	Marcel Paterni	France	81.70	125	130	132.5	132.5	110	115	~~117.5~~	115	140	145	147.5	147.5	395
8	John Powell	Australia	81.80	110	115	120	120	107.5	112.5	117.5	117.5	~~145~~	145	~~155~~	145	382.5
9	Willy Claes	Belgium	80.50	107.5	~~112.5~~	~~112.5~~	107.5	107.5	112.5	~~115~~	112.5	~~137.5~~	137.5	~~145~~	137.5	357.5
10	Muhammad Iqbal Butt	Pakistan	82.50	100	~~105~~	105	105	95	100	102.5	102.5	130	~~135~~	~~135~~	130	337.5

== New records ==
Press	140 kg	Tommy Kono (USA)	OR
Snatch	132.5 kg	Tommy Kono (USA)	OR
Clean & Jerk	175 kg	Tommy Kono (USA)	WR
Total	447.5 kg	Tommy Kono (USA)	WR
