= John Powell (weightlifter) =

Australian weightlifter (1931–2008)

Personal information
- Nationality: Australian
- Born: 26 April 1931; Newcastle, New South Wales, Australia
- Died: 3 August 2008 (aged 77); Newcastle, New South Wales, Australia

Sport
- Sport: Weightlifting

John Powell (26 April 1931 – 3 August 2008) was an Australian weightlifter. He competed in the men's light heavyweight event at the 1956 Summer Olympics.
