= Svend Engedal =

Danish-born American soccer player

Personal information
- Full name: Svend Robert Husted Engedal
- Date of birth: June 23, 1928
- Place of birth: Denmark
- Date of death: November 6, 2001 (aged 73)
- Place of death: Long Beach, California, U.S.
- Height: 5 ft 10 in (1.78 m)
- Position: Goalkeeper

Senior career*
Years	Team	Apps	(Gls)
- Danish-American S.C.

International career
1956–1957	United States	3	(0)
- * Club domestic league appearances and goals

Svend Robert Husted Engedal (June 23, 1928 - November 6, 2001) was a U.S. soccer goalkeeper. He played on the U.S. soccer team at the 1956 Summer Olympics and earned two caps with the U.S. national team in 1957.

Engedal was born in Denmark, but moved to the United States where he gained his citizenship on September 15, 1955. He was then selected as the U.S. goalkeeper at the 1956 Summer Olympics. The U.S. lost 9–1 to Italy in the first round, eliminating the team from the tournament. At the time, Engedal played club soccer in Los Angeles. Both of Engedal's two games with the national team came in losses to Mexico in April 1957. The first was a 6–0 loss on April 7 and the second a 7–2 loss on April 28.

At the time of the Olympics, Engedal played for the Danish-American Soccer Club.
