= Alfonso Marina =

American soccer player (1930–2004)

Alfonso Marina (La Coruña, August 5, 1930 – Long Island, May 27, 2004) was an American soccer player who spent his career in the American Soccer League, earned one cap with the U.S. national team, and was a member of the 1956 Olympic soccer team.

Marina earned one cap with the U.S. national team in a 3–2 loss to Iceland on August 25, 1955. Marina was then selected for the 1956 U.S. Olympic soccer team. The U.S. had a successful tour of Asia before the games, winning five and losing three. However, the games proved anticlimactic when the U.S. lost, 9–1, to Yugoslavia in the first round. At the time of the games, he played for Brooklyn Hispano in the American Soccer League.

Marina died in Long Island, New York on May 27, 2004, at the age of 73.
