= William Tully (diver) =

Australian diver (1930s–1976)

Personal information
- Nationality: Australian
- Born: 1931 or 1932
- Died: 10 January 1976 (aged 44) Sydney, Australia

Sport
- Sport: Diving

William Tully (1931 or 1932 – 10 January 1976) was an Australian diver. He competed in the men's 10-metre platform event at the 1956 Summer Olympics. Tully died of cancer in 1976, aged 44.
