= Jim George (weightlifter) =

American weightlifter (born 1935)

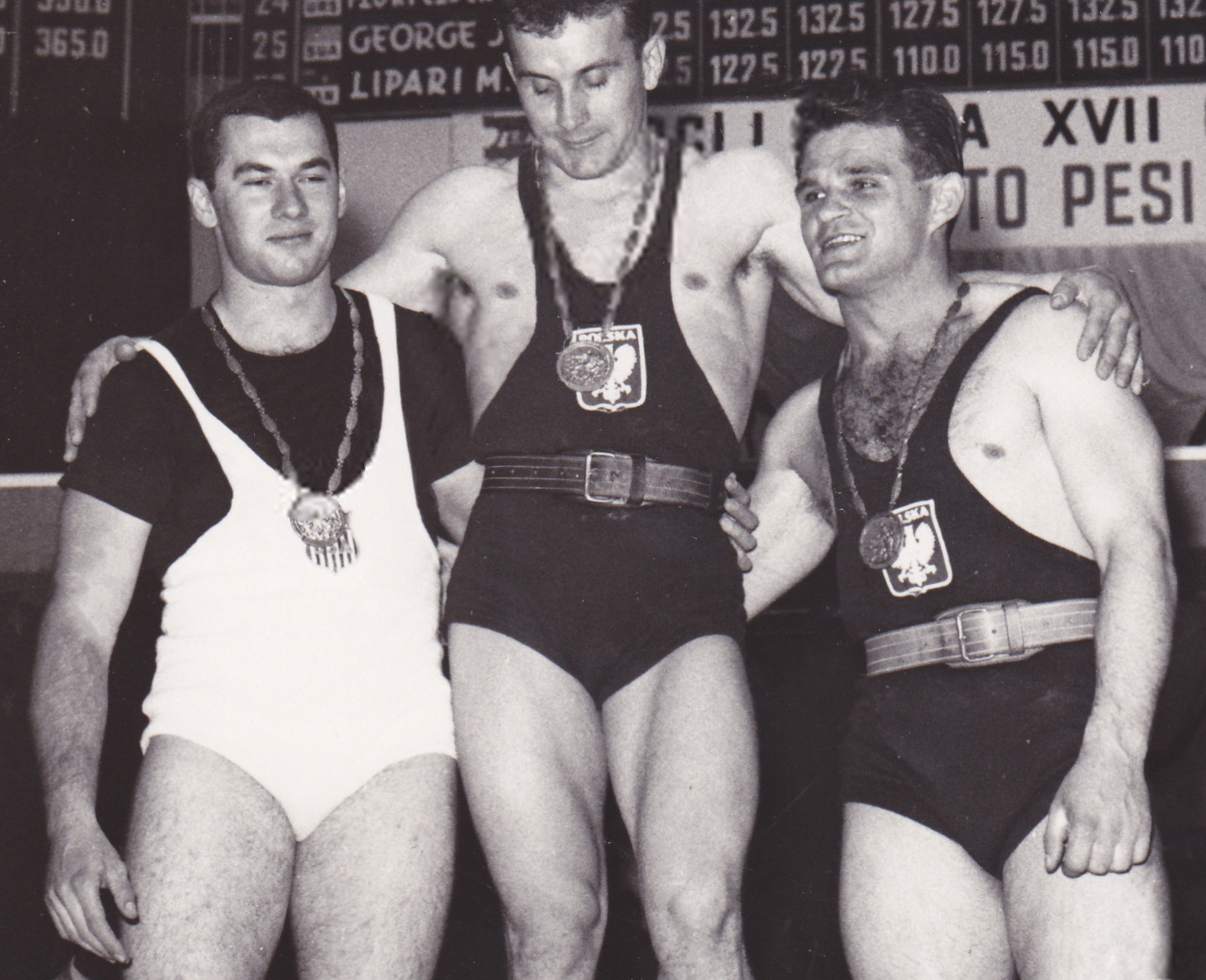
- Jim George, Ireneusz Paliński and Jan Bochenek at the 1960 Olympics

Personal information
- Born: June 1, 1935 (age 91) Akron, Ohio, United States
- Height: 1.78 m (5 ft 10 in)
- Weight: 81–83 kg (179–183 lb)

Sport
- Sport: Weightlifting
Medal record
Representing the United States
Bronze medal – third place	1956 Melbourne	light-heavyweight
Silver medal – second place	1960 Rome	light-heavyweight
World Championships
Bronze medal – third place	1955 Munich	-82.5 kg
Silver medal – second place	1957 Tehran	-82.5 kg
Silver medal – second place	1958 Stockholm	-82.5 kg
Bronze medal – third place	1959 Warsaw	-82.5 kg
Pan American Games
Gold medal – first place	1959 Chicago	-82.5 kg

James D. George (born June 1, 1935) is a retired American weightlifter. He competed at the 1956 and 1960 Olympics and won a bronze and a silver medal, respectively.

George is the son of Bulgarian immigrants from Macedonia. His elder brother, Pete George, was also an Olympic weightlifter. Jim was a four-time AAU champion and the 1959 Pan American champion in the light-heavyweight division. He also won four medals at the world championships (1955–1959) and set two world record (1956), in the snatch and clean and jerk.
