= Erhard Neumann =

American cyclist

Butch Neumann
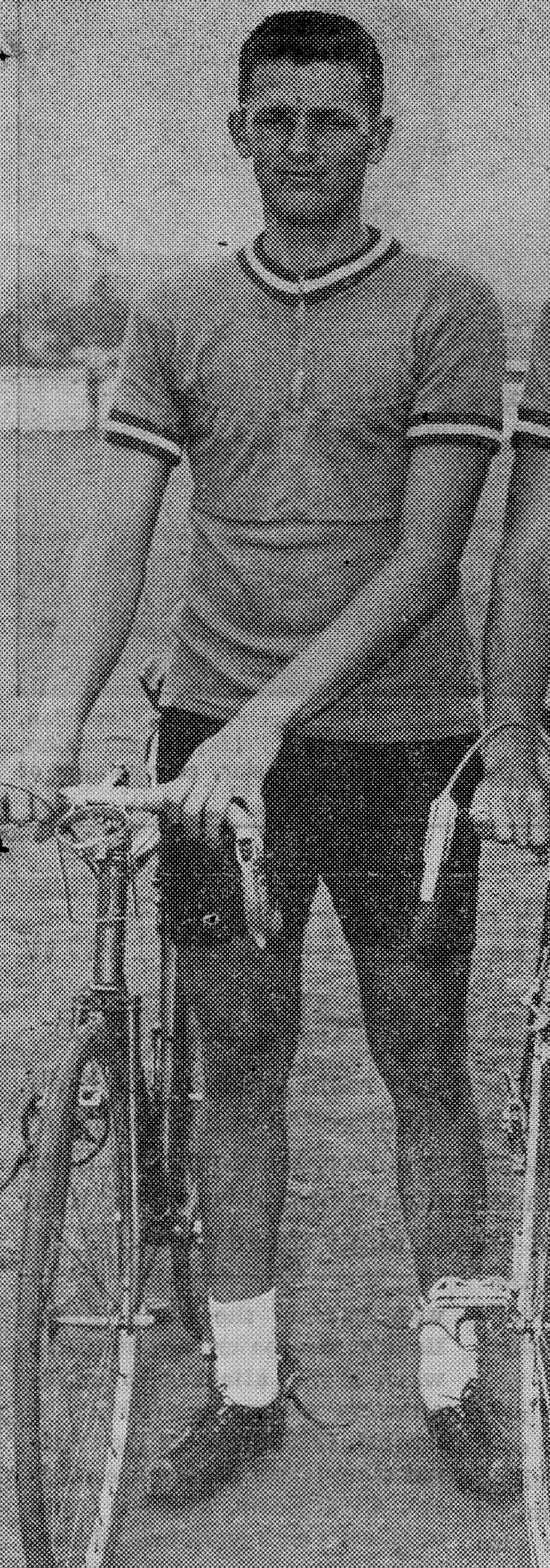
- Neumann, circa 1956

Personal information
- Full name: Erhard M. Neumann
- Born: September 1, 1932 St. Louis, Missouri, U.S.
- Died: January 28, 2002 (aged 69) Draper, Utah, U.S.

Cycling career
- Sport: Cycling

Erhard M. "Butch" Neumann (September 1, 1932 – January 28, 2002) was an American cyclist. He competed in the individual and team road race events at the 1956 Summer Olympics.
