= Joe Becker (cyclist) =

American cyclist (1931–2014)

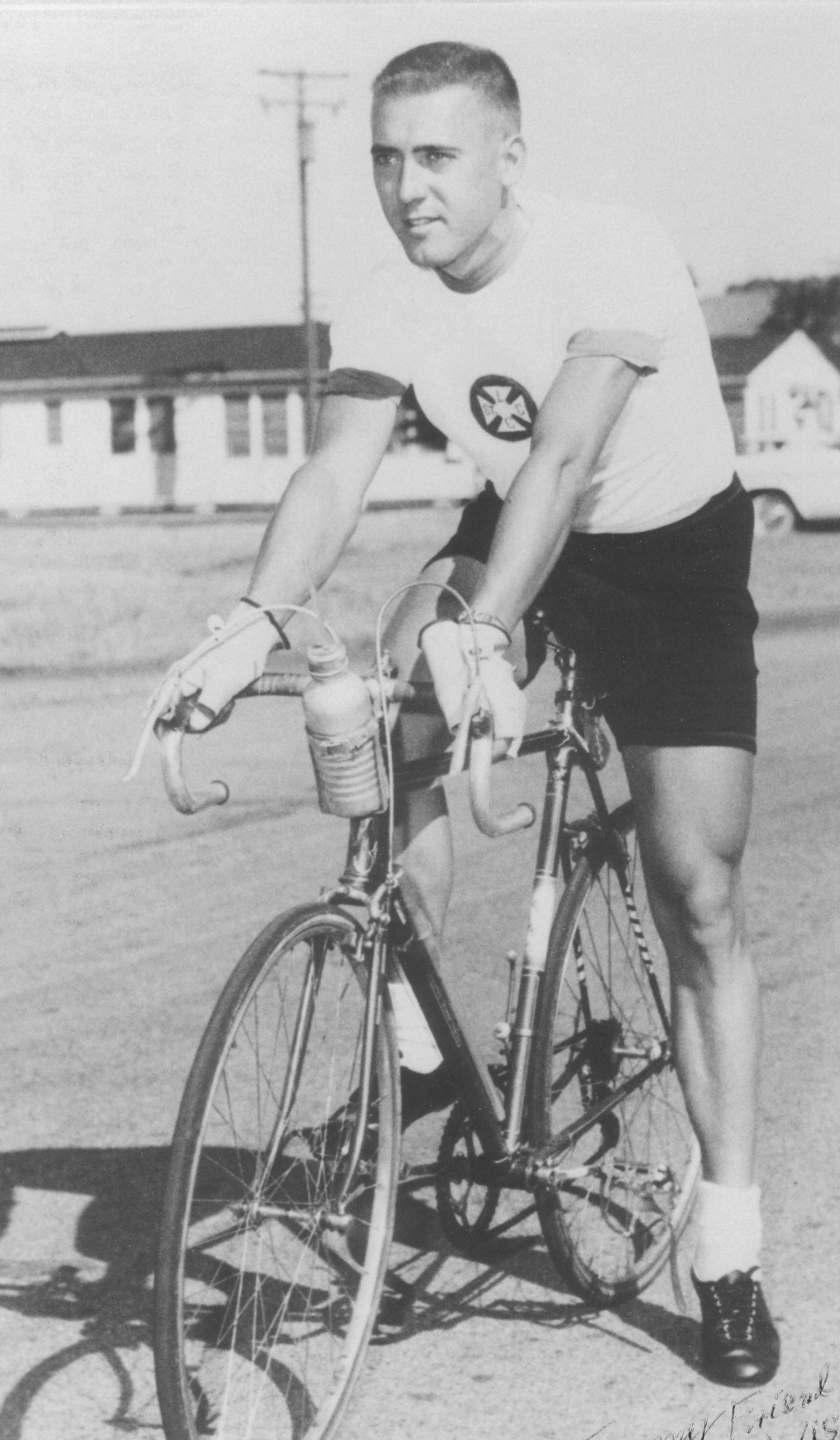

Personal information
- Born: September 14, 1931 St. Louis, Missouri, United States
- Died: June 11, 2014 (aged 82) Naples, Florida, United States

Cycling career
- Sport: Cycling

Joseph Harry Becker (September 14, 1931 – June 11, 2014) was an American cyclist. He competed in the individual and team road race events at the 1956 Summer Olympics.
