= Ron Tomsic =

American former basketball player

Personal information
- Born: Ronald Paul Tomsic; April 3, 1933 (age 93) Oakland, California, U.S.
Medal record
Men's basketball
Representing the United States
Olympic Games
Gold medal – first place	1956 Melbourne	Team competition

Ronald Paul Tomsic was born on April 3, 1933. He is an American former basketball player.

Tomsic, a 5 ft 11 in (1.80 m) guard born in Oakland, California, played college basketball at Stanford University from 1951 to 1955. A three-time All-PCC selection, he scored 1,416 points in his Stanford career, the most in school history at the time. He scored 40 points in a game against USC in 1955, sixth on the school's single-game scoring list, and still holds Stanford's single-season field goal attempts record. His name appears near the top of many other Stanford basketball scoring records.

Following his graduation from Stanford, Tomsic was drafted by the Syracuse Nationals in the 1955 NBA draft but did not play in the NBA. He played AAU basketball for the San Francisco Olympic Club, and in 1956, was selected to be on the United States national basketball team for the 1956 Summer Olympics. In the Olympics, he scored 89 points for Team USA as the United States dominated its competition on the way to the gold medal. Since the death of Carl Cain on 2 June 2024, he is the last surviving member of the Olympic Champions' team of 1956. Tomsic has three children, Mark, Jill, and Todd.
