= Ferenc Siák =

Hungarian diver

Personal information
- Nationality: Hungarian
- Born: 24 January 1933 (age 93) Budapest, Hungary

Sport
- Sport: Diving

Ferenc Siák (born 24 January 1933) is a Hungarian diver. He competed in two events, the 3 metre springboard and 10 metre platform, at the 1956 Summer Olympics in Melbourne, Australia.
