= Richard Conner (diver) =

American diver (1934–2019)

Personal information
- Full name: Richard Carroll Conner
- Born: March 25, 1934 Pueblo, Colorado, U.S.
- Died: July 8, 2019 (aged 85) Rancho Santa Fe, California, U.S.
Medal record
Men's diving
Representing the United States
Olympic Games
Bronze medal – third place	1956 Melbourne	Platform

Richard Carroll Conner (March 25, 1934 – July 8, 2019) was an American diver and Olympic bronze medalist. He represented his native country at the 1956 Summer Olympics in Melbourne, where he received a bronze medal.

Conner was born in Pueblo, Colorado on March 25, 1934. He attended the University of Southern California. Conner died in Rancho Santa Fe, California on July 8, 2019, at the age of 85.
