= George Van Meter =

American cyclist

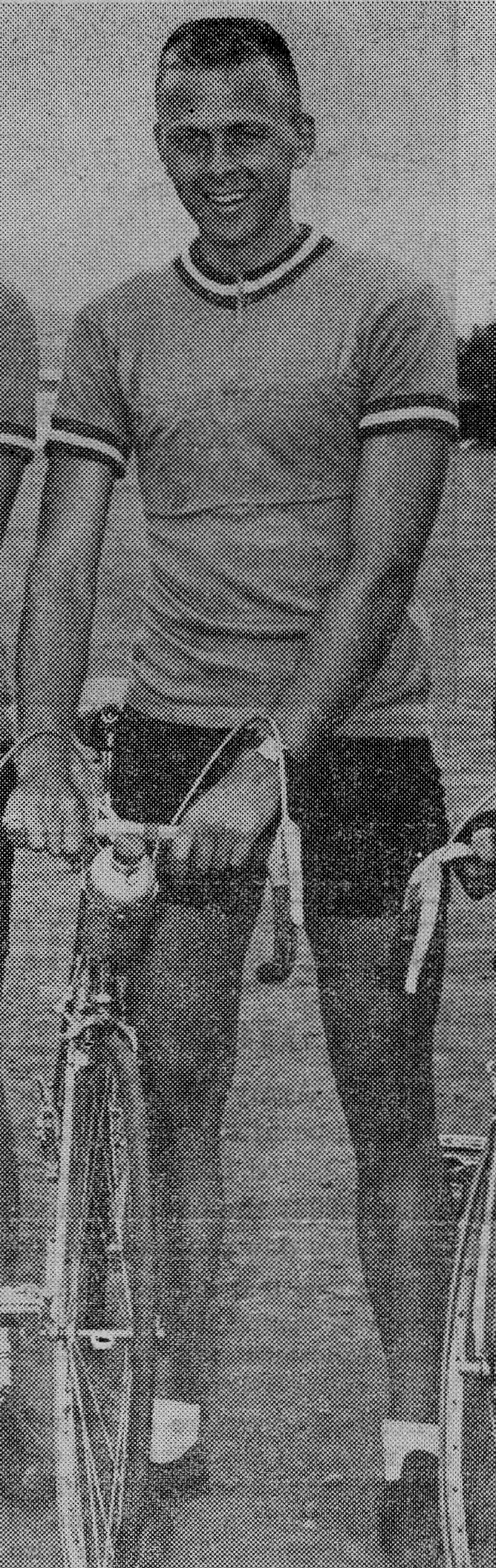
- Van Meter, circa 1960

Personal information
- Born: 23 August 1932 St. Louis, Missouri, United States
- Died: 15 November 2007 (aged 75) Bakersfield, California, United States

Cycling career
- Sport: Cycling

George Van Meter (August 23, 1932 – November 15, 2007) was an American cyclist. He competed in the individual and team road race events at the 1956 Summer Olympics.
