= Hugh Wiley =

American equestrian

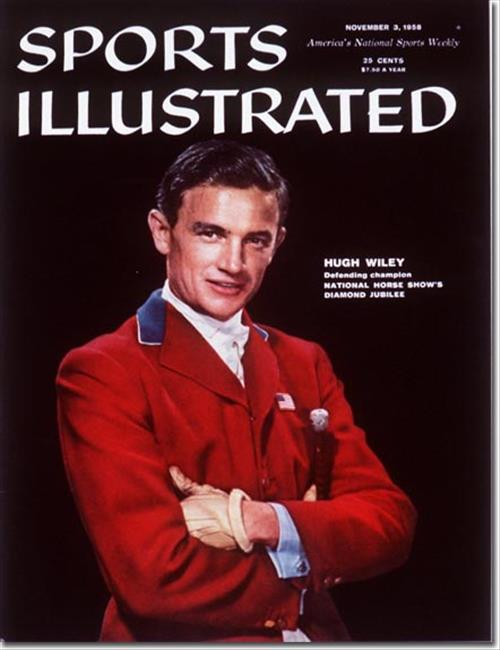
- Wiley on the cover of Sports Illustrated in 1958

Personal information
- Born: May 21, 1927 New Haven, Connecticut, United States
- Died: September 3, 1999 (aged 72) Palmyra, Virginia, United States

Sport
- Sport: Equestrian
Medal record
Equestrian
Representing the United States
Pan American Games
Gold medal – first place	1959 Chicago	Individual jumping
Gold medal – first place	1959 Chicago	Team jumping

Hugh Wiley (May 21, 1927 – September 3, 1999) was an American equestrian. He competed at the 1956 Summer Olympics and the 1960 Summer Olympics.
