= George Onekea =

American swimmer

Personal information
- Full name: George Helela Onekea Jr.
- National team: United States
- Born: March 25, 1939 (age 87) Honolulu, Hawaii, U.S.
- Height: 5 ft 9 in (1.75 m)
- Weight: 165 lb (75 kg)

Sport
- Sport: Swimming
- Strokes: Freestyle
- College team: Ohio State University

George Helela Onekea Jr. (born March 25, 1939) is an American former competition swimmer who represented the United States as a 17-year-old at the 1956 Summer Olympics in Melbourne, Australia. Onekea competed in the preliminary heats of the men's 400-meter freestyle and men's 1,500-meter freestyle, recording times of 4:41.6 and 19:13.6 in those events, respectively, but not placing.

== See also ==
- List of Ohio State University people
