= William Kooistra =

American water polo player (1926–1995)

Bill Kooistra
Personal information
- Full name: William August Kooistra
- Born: August 26, 1926 Chicago, United States
- Died: March 30, 1995 (aged 68) Chicago, United States
- Height: 180 cm (5 ft 11 in)
- Weight: 79 kg (174 lb)

Sport
- Sport: Water polo
- Club: Illinois Athletic Club (IAC)
- Coached by: Sam Greller (IAC); Urho Saari (52 Olympics); Neal Kohlhase (56 Olympics)

William "Bill" August Kooistra (August 26, 1926 – March 30, 1995) was an American water polo player who competed for Northwestern University and participated in the 1952 Summer Olympics and the 1956 Summer Olympics.

He was born in Chicago on August 26, 1926, one of five siblings. As a youngster, Bill swam with Chicago's Griffith Natatorium swim team as had his younger brothers Dan, and Sam Kooistra, a future Olympian.

Kooistra attended DePaul University though they had no varsity water polo team at the time.

== Illinois Athletic Club ==
Kooistra served as captain, and both swam and played Water Polo for the Illinois Athletic Club under water polo Coach Sam Greller, a Water Polo Hall of Fame inductee, who coached water polo for the IAC beginning in 1948 and continuing through at least 1960. He played on a total of 15 Indoor National Championship water polo teams, primarily as a member of the Illinois Athletic Club. While competing with the Illinois Athletic Club, he won on National Indoor Championship teams in 1955 and 1958 and on indoor championship water polo teams in 1954–1956, 1959, 1960 and 1962. With a lengthy and distinguished career in the sport, he was a recipient of All American honors in water polo thirteen times.

== 1952 Helsinki Olympics ==
Kooistra was a member of the American water polo team which finished fourth among twenty-one participating countries in the 1952 Olympic tournament in Helsinki under Head Coach Urho Saari. Several of the 1952 team had played for Saari at El Segundo High School, and the majority had trained with Saari at the El Segundo Swim Club in preparation for the Olympics. Consistently call on to participate due to his skill and experience, Kooistra played seven matches. Though the U.S. won several games in the preliminary rounds, in the final rounds in early August, 1952, they lost to pre-game favorite Yugoslavia 4–2, and were shut out by Hungary 4–0, settling for a fourth-place finish with pre-game favorite Hungary taking the gold medal, Yugoslavia taking the silver medal, and Italy taking the bronze.

== 1956 Melbourne Olympics ==
Four years later he served as Captain of the American water polo team that finished fifth overall among ten participating countries at the 1956 tournament in Melbourne. He played five matches under Head Olympic Coach Neal Kohlhase and Assistant Coach Urho Saari, both Water Polo Hall of Fame members. Hungary took the gold, Yugoslavia took the silver, and the Russian team captured the bronze. A well-publicized feature of the tournament was a very rough late round match between pre-Olympic favorite Hungary and Russia that had to be stopped by the referees. On December 6, the Hungarian team won the match 4–0, and went undefeated in the tournament, but considerable animosity existed between the Russian and Hungarian teams as a result of the recent Russian occupation of Hungary in November, 1956, subsequent to a student revolt in the same month.

In international competition, Kooistra competed with the US National water polo team that won the gold medal at the 1955 Pan American Games in Mexico City, Mexico, and was on the U.S. team that won a silver medal at the 1959 Pan American Games in Chicago, Illinois.

=== Careers ===
Like his brother Sam, Bill Koistra had a long career with the Chicago Fire Department where he served as a Lieutenant. In service to the Water Polo community, from 1956 to 1960, he served as a US Olympic Committee acting secretary, and served on the committee organizing the Pan American Games in 1959.

=== Honors ===
In 1976, he was inducted into the USA Water Polo Hall of Fame, partly in tribute to his 1952 and 1956 Olympic participation, his contributions to many Senior National Championship teams, and his work for the U.S. Olympic committee. He received the John Curren award as a Most Valuable Player at the 1962 National Indoor Water Polo Championship. Like his brother Sam, he was also made a member of the Roseland-Pullman's Hall of Fame for Sports.

At the age of 68, Kooistra died March 30, 1995, in Chicago, Illinois. He was survived by wife Betty C. Starzyk Koistra, three daughters and grandchildren. He had served as a President of both the Roseland Kiwanis Club, and the Midwest Chapter of U.S. Olympians. Funeral services were held April 3 at the Rosemoor Funeral Home and he was buried at the Holy Cross Cemetery, as would be his brother Samuel.
