= William Farrell (diver) =

American diver

Willie Farrell
Personal information
- Full name: William Cesar Farrell
- Born: October 6, 1934 (age 91) Los Angeles, California, U.S.

Sport
- Sport: Diving

William Cesar Farrell (born October 6, 1934) is an American diver. He competed in the men's 10 metre platform event at the 1956 Summer Olympics.
