= Phillips 66ers =

US amateur basketball team, 1919 to 1968

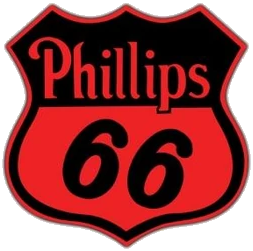
- Nickname: The Oilers
- Leagues: AAU 1921–1968; Missouri Valley 1935–1940; ABL 1945–1948; NIBL 1948–1961; NABL 1966–1968
- Founded: 1919
- Folded: 1968
- Arena: Bartlesville High School Gym (1,400); Phillips Gymnasium (2,600)
- Team colors: Red, White & Black
- Ownership: Phillips
- Championships: 11 AAU tournament 11 National Industrial Basketball League; 3 ABL; 2 Olympic Trial Playoffs
Home	Away

The Phillips 66ers (also known as the Oilers) were an amateur basketball team located in Bartlesville, Oklahoma, sponsored and run by the Phillips Petroleum Company. The 66ers were a national phenomenon that grew from a small-town team to an organization of accomplished amateur athletes receiving national and worldwide attention. Under the sponsorship of the company's owner, Frank Phillips, the team, which began playing in 1919, participated in the Amateur Athletic Union (AAU), the nation's premier basketball league before the National Basketball Association. Between 1920 and 1950, some of the strongest basketball teams in the United States were sponsored by corporations: Phillips 66, 20th Century Fox, Safeway Inc., Caterpillar Inc., and others.

The 66ers were a perennial power in AAU basketball in the 1940s, and 1950s. The team won 11 national championships at the AAU national tournament between 1940 and 1963, including six consecutive AAU titles, from 1943 to 1948. In 1948, the 66ers combined with Adolph Rupp's "Fabulous Five" University of Kentucky team to form the U.S. team that won the Olympic basketball tournament.

They played in Bartlesville and neighboring towns for several years, strictly small-time. A rivalry soon built up with Empire Oil & Gas.

== History ==
=== Team creation ===
Phillips Petroleum was founded in 1917, at the start of the oil boom. In 1919, several of Bartlesville's local boys were returning from World War I. Some of them found jobs at Phillips and a few decided to form a Phillips basketball team. In 1920 the Phillips team began playing other corporate teams. In 1921, a group of Phillips employees, looking for some way to stay in shape during the winter months, organized a team in the Bartlesville YMCA basketball league.

Initially, their matches were confined to Bartlesville and nearby areas, maintaining a modest profile. However, as time progressed, a spirited rivalry emerged with Empire Oil & Gas.

=== 1921–1942: First years in AAU ===
The 66ers joined the Amateur Athletic Union, which featured the best basketball players at that time; in 1921.

The best player of the team in the 1920s was Paul Endacott who had been a college star at Kansas and was named the Amateur Athletic Union Player of the Year in 1923 (there was no NCAA tournament in those days). Paul Endacott started playing for the 66ers in 1927 being a Phillips employee. By the same year a rivalry with Phillips University of Enid who the national collegiate runner-up started to rise.

Phillips 66 did not field a team for the 1928–29 season. But the following season coinciding with the start of marketing products to the public, the Phillips' brass decided to go all out with its basketball team. Phillips University of Enid coach Lou Wilkie was hired as the first full-time coach in 1929, and several players, many from the disbanded Mid-Continent Oil Co. team, were brought in.

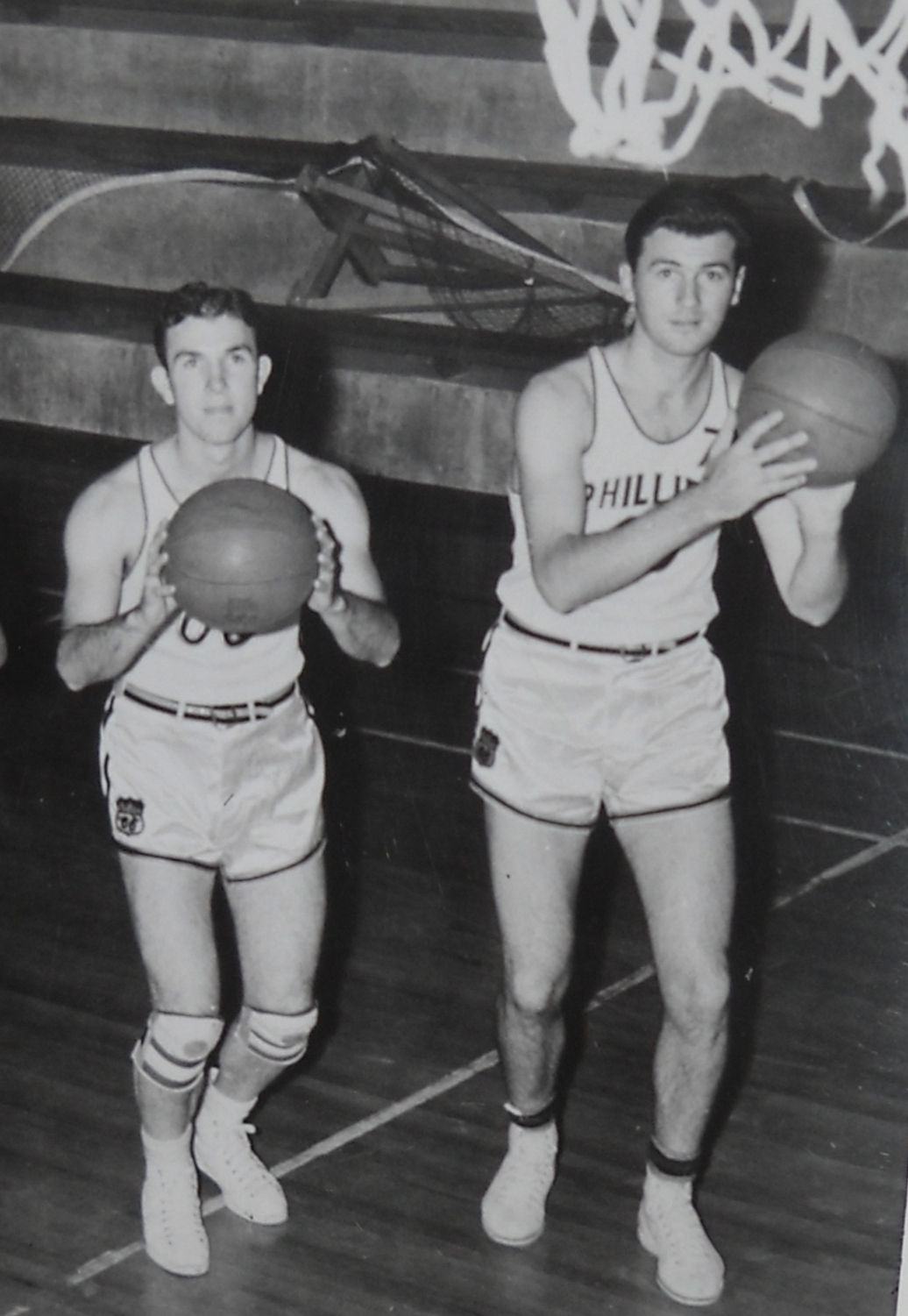
Phillips 66ers players Jimmy McNatt (left) and Hank Luisetti (right) during the 1941–42 season.

The 1929–30 team lost in the second round of the national AAU tournament, as did the next year's version. Then, with the Depression raging, Phillips dropped basketball to concentrate on survival. That strategy worked, and by 1936, Phillips was more convinced than ever that a strong basketball team would be good for business.
The AAU's annual tournament drew the best players in the world, as well as thousands of fans and dozens of sports writers and broadcasters. During the 1930s, the only professional basketball teams were barnstormers like the House of David and the Harlem Globetrotters. In all those years the 66ers played against teams fielded by various commercial companies, under the sanction of the Amateur Athletic Union.

Paul Endacott and young prospect David Perkins were the key players in the 1930s. Phillips gradually made a name for itself, finishing second in the AAU tournament in 1936-37 and again in 1938–39 with a 36–11 record. That season three of those 11 losses came at the hands of the Oklahoma City Parks. When the Parks disbanded after the season, Phillips hired the top two players, Grady Lewis and Bill Martin who earned AAU All-America honors as a guard at Oklahoma.

Coaching the team for 2–4 years at the end of the 1930s was G. Harold "Smitty" Schmidt, who had also played for Phog Allen at the University of Kansas. With Lewis and Martin in the squad, and the likes of Joe Fortenberry and Don Lockard, the 66ers rolled to a 48–5 record and a 39–36 victory over the reigning champions Denver Nuggets in the finals of the 1939-1940 AAU tournament. When the team got back to the Bartlesville station, there was a tremendous number of people out to welcome the champions.

The team finished second in the 1940–1941 season. One of its losses came after the season, in a Red Cross benefit game in Tulsa. There, the 66ers lost to Arkansas, led by a skinny 6-8 center John Freiberger who joined the 66ers the next year. But that was the time that World War II escalated, and with the United States involved, most of the top players of the 66ers joined the military. Bill Martin joined the Army Air Corps in 1942 and John Freiberger in 1943, thus the team had poor results during the 1941–1942 season.

=== 1943–1946: Beginning of the dynasty ===
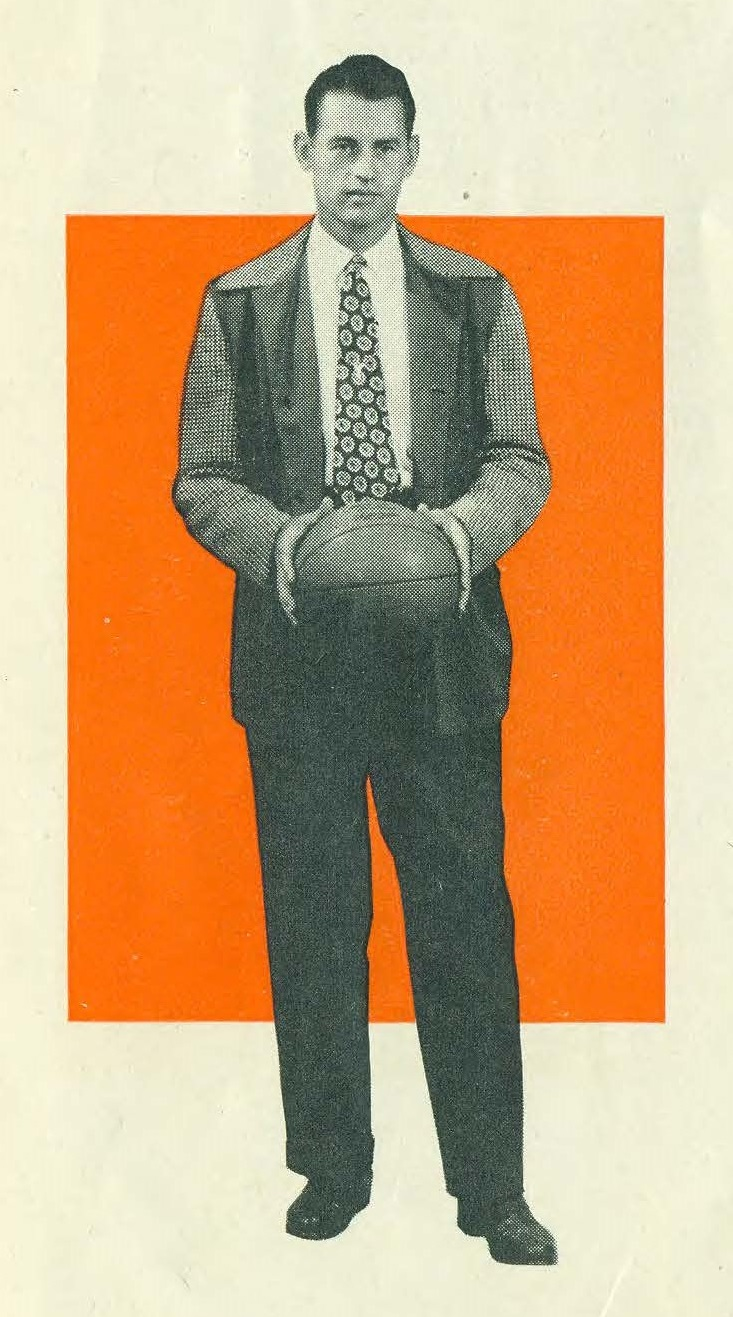
Bud Browning played for the 66ers from 1937–1943 and served as the team's head coach 1943–48, 1953–54 and 1958–64

Phillips dominated the AAU titles from 1943 to 1948, winning six straight titles and posting a 241–24 record (+909) against all comers. With the World War II war ongoing in 1943 and Phillips being a war-related industry, most of its employees were exempt from the draft. And with other AAU teams weakened the 66ers won AAU titles in 1943–44, 1944–45 and 1945–1946.

=== 1946–1952: Bob Kurland era ===
In the 1945–46 season, the college basketball was dominated by the first two "modern big men": George Mikan of the DePaul Blue Demons, and two-time NCAA champion Bob Kurland of the Oklahoma A&M Aggies. Bob Kurland became a 66er in 1946 and was considered the club's greatest player since then.

Kurland made the 66ers more popular and powerful than ever. Huge crowds thronged to the Bartlesville high school gym, which only seated 1,400 to see Kurland and the 66ers rolled to a 52–2 record in 1946–47. It was the year that the war had ended, and most of the former players returned, including Freiberger and Martin. Those two teamed up with Bob Kurland and the 66ers rolled to their fourth straight AAU championship in 1946–1947 season.

The 66ers achieved a stunning 62–3 record in 1947–48 and won their AAU 5th title in a row.

Phillips also dominated the 1948 Olympic trials, beating NCAA champion Kentucky Wildcats, 53–49, in the finals. That put five 66ers Bob Kurland, Cab Renick, Lew Beck, Gordon Carpenter and R.C. Pitts on the Olympic team, and made Phillips coach Bud Browning the head coach over Kentucky's Adolph Rupp. Ironically, it was the second time Rupp had played second fiddle to a Phillips man. He was a back-up to Paul Endacott in their college days at Kansas.

The Phillips 66ers' record finished in 1949 after the Oilers lost to the Oakland Bittners in the AAU finals. According to George Durham, the team's publicity director and business manager for 20 years that team generated approximately $545,000 in free publicity during the 1948–49 season.

The 66ers won the AAU title again in 1949–50, but that was followed by two bare seasons in 1950–1951 and 1951–1952 where they did not manage to repeat the triumph in the Olympic Trial Games (Peoria Caterpillars won the playoffs). Kurland set a record by being named to his second Olympic team in 1952, but he broke a lot of hearts in Bartlesville by deciding to retire just after the Games. The following year (1953) Clyde Lovellette joined Mikan signing for the Minneapolis Lakers.

=== 1953–1960: Restructure and Olympic triumphs ===
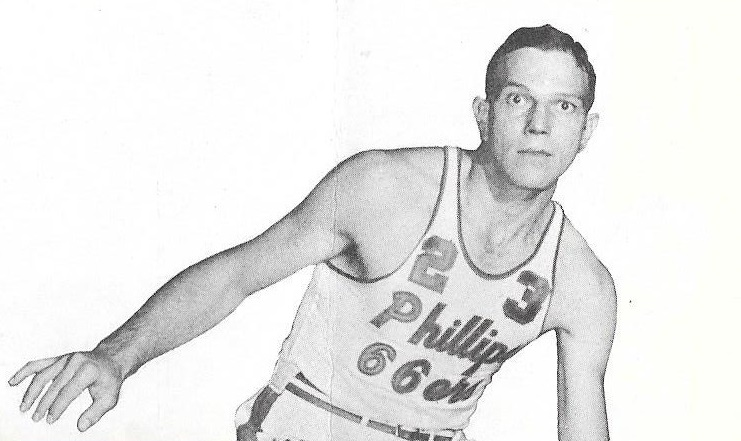
66ers guard Wayne Glasgow, circa 1952

In 1953 a 6–6 foot forward named Pete Silas signed from the NCAA Georgia Tech Yellow Jackets. Silas had led the Southeastern Conference in scoring despite competing against such talented players as Cliff Hagan and Frank Ramsey and Louisiana State's Bob Pettit. He made the Armed Forces All-Stars and played on the gold medal-winning Pan-American Games team in 1955. Despite the fact that Silas was in the Army the 66ers led by a 6–9 scoring-machine forward from Colorado named Burdie Haldorson won the 1956 Olympic Trials playoffs and sent five men to the 1956 Olympics.

Haldorson set the team record by scoring 53 points against the Cleveland Pipers in 1960. He also tied Kurland's record by making the Olympic team for the second time in 1960 Olympics. He retired after that and went to work for Phillips' Denver division.

=== 1960–1968: Decline and the end ===
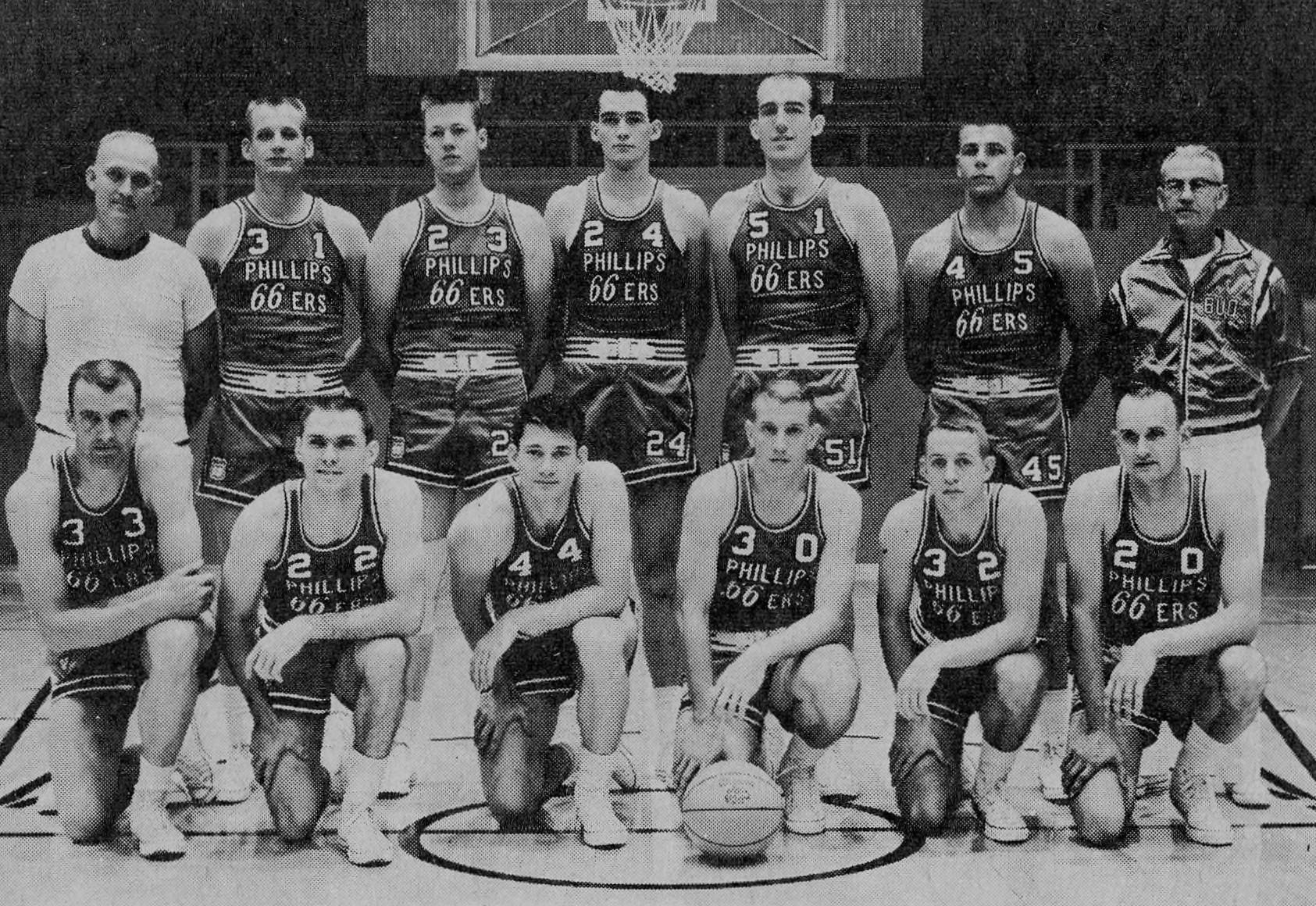
The 1963–64 Phillips 66ers, from left to right: [standing] Don Watkins (team manager), Jerry Shipp, Ken Charlton, Jim Hagen, Mike Moran, Terry Cerkvenik, Bud Browning, [kneeling] Ken Saylors, Del Ray Mounts, Denny Price, Larry Pursiful, Charlie Bowerman and Bob Turner.

By the time Haldorson retired, AAU basketball was dying a slow death. TV had discovered the NBA, and the pros were starting to stabilize and pay more money than teams like Phillips could. The National Industrial Basketball League, the top amateur loop, disbanded in 1961.

The Phillips players practiced at night, since they worked during the daytime. They were excused from that daytime work at noon on game day. The team faced challenges recruiting talent as pro salaries increased. But still a few notable players came to Bartlesville, like Charlie Bowerman, a 6–1 guard from Wabash College and Gary Thompson from Iowa State . Thompson helped the 66ers win the 1961–1962 AAU tournament, and he was named the MVP.

In the 1960s the AAU basketball faced hard times. The Big Ten had always prohibited its teams from playing AAU squads, and in the mid-60s other conferences followed suit. Newspapers started cutting down on space given to AAU teams, partly because of the pro glut and partly because of an attitude that companies should pay for all advertising and publicity.

The team cost about $150,000 a year to operate, not including players' salaries. Very little of that was recouped by ticket sales. The highest tickets were $2, but most of the tickets were $1 or 50 cents.

The final blow fell in 1967: The ABA was founded. The ABA was on firmer financial footing than the old ABL, and it needed bodies to compete with the established NBA. Seven 66ers jumped to the new league, most notably Darel Carrier and John Beasley, both of whom had excellent ABA careers.

The 66ers already had an AAU schedule for 1967–68, so enough players were called out of retirement to form a team to play out the schedule. The 66ers lost their last game ever, 57–52, to the Spokane (Washington) Vaughan Realtors in the quarterfinals of the AAU national tournament.

The 66ers fulfilled their other goal: making the Phillips' name and their northeastern Oklahoma town known all over the country.

== Notable players ==
The Oilers placed a record of 39 players in the AAU's All-America teams and 21 became members of the AAU Basketball Hall of Fame. In the 1930s, these All-Americans included Jay Wallenstrom (1937) and Ray Ebbing (1939).

=== AAU All-Americans ===
In the 1940s, Phillips 66 All-Americans were the players below:

- Doc Lockard (1940)
- Joe Fortenberry (1940)
- Grady Lewis (1940)
- Hank Luisetti (1942)
- Bill Martin (1942, 1946)
- Jimmy McNatt (1943–1946)
- Gordon Carpenter (1943–1947)
- Fred Pralle (1944)
- Paul Lindemann (1945)
- Marty Nash (1946–1947)
- Bob Kurland (1947–1952)
- Cab Renick (1947–1948)
- R. C. Pitts (1948)
- Gerald Tucker (1949–1950)
- Roy Lipscomb (1949–1950) and
- John Stanich (1949).

=== Players in the USA Team ===
The players below played for the USA Team in major tournaments representing the 66ers.

- Gordon Carpenter played in the 1948 Olympics
- Jesse Renick played in the 1948 Olympics
- Bob Kurland played in the 1948 Olympics and the 1952 Olympics
- R.C. Pitts played in the 1948 Olympics
- Omar Browning played in the 1948 Olympics (head coach)
- Louis Wilke played in the 1948 Olympics (team manager)
- Jerry Shipp played in the 1963 FIBA World Championship (captain), the 1963 Pan American Games and the 1964 Olympics (captain)
- Burdette Haldorson played in the 1956 Olympics, the 1959 Pan American Games and the 1960 Olympics
- Gilbert "Gib" Ford played in the 1956 Olympics
- Charles Darling played in the 1956 Olympics
- William Hougland played in the 1952 Olympics and the 1956 Olympics
- Robert Jeangerard played in the 1956 Olympics
- James Walsh played in the 1956 Olympics
- Gerald Tucker participated in the 1956 Olympics (head coach)
- Darel Carrier played in the 1967 FIBA World Championship and the 1967 Pan American Games
- Raymond Carey played in the 1967 Pan American Games
- Kendall Rhine played in the 1967 Pan American Games
- Don Kojis played in the 1963 Pan American Games
- George Bon Salle played in the 1959 Pan American Games
- William Evans played in the 1959 Pan American Games

== Trophies ==
The Phillips 66ers won 11 out of the 14 championships organized by the NIBL from 1947 to 1961 and 11 Athletic Amateur leagues from 1940 to 1963. They managed to collect 27 championship medals in total.

- AAU National Tournament: 11 (1939–1940, 1942–1943, 1943–1944, 1944–1945, 1945–1946, 1946–1947, 1947–1948, 1949–1950, 1961–1962)
- National Industrial Basketball League: 11 (1948–1949, 1949–1950, 1950–1951, 1951–1952, 1952–1953, 1953–1954, 1954–1955, 1955–1956, 1956–1957, 1957–1958, 1959–1960)
- ABL: 3 (1946, 1947, 1948)
- Olympic Trial Playoffs: 2 (1948, 1956)
