= Billy Evans (basketball, born 1932) =

American basketball player (1932–2020)

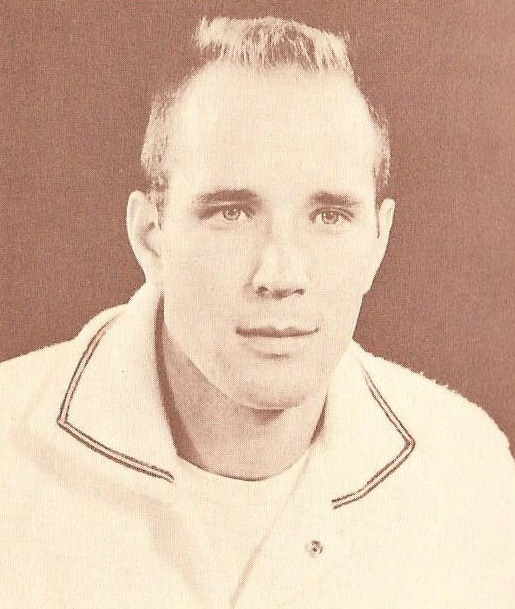
- Evans with the Phillips 66ers.

Personal information
- Born: September 13, 1932 Berea, Kentucky, U.S.
- Died: November 22, 2020 (aged 88)
- Listed height: 6 ft 0.5 in (1.84 m)
- Listed weight: 185 lb (84 kg)

Career information
- High school: Berea (Berea, Kentucky)
- College: Kentucky (1951–1955)
- NBA draft: 1955: 5th round, 32nd overall pick
- Drafted by: Rochester Royals
- Position: Guard
- Number: 42
- Stats at Basketball Reference
Medals
Men's basketball
Representing the United States
Olympic Games
Gold medal – first place	1956 Melbourne	Team competition
Pan American Games
Gold medal – first place	1959 Chicago	Team competition

William Best Evans (September 13, 1932 – November 22, 2020) was an American basketball player who competed in the 1956 Summer Olympics. Born in Berea, Kentucky, Evans played collegiately at the University of Kentucky. He was part of the United States basketball team which won the gold medal in 1956.

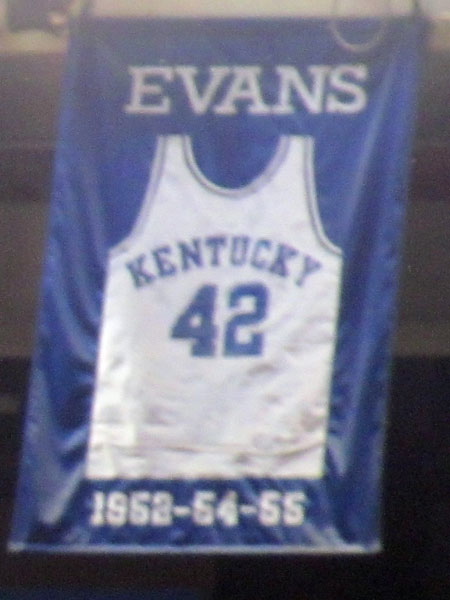
A jersey honoring Evans hangs in Rupp Arena.

Evans died on November 22, 2020, at the age of 88.
