= Sam Kooistra =

American water polo player (1935–2010)

Personal information
- Full name: Samuel Gene Kooistra
- Born: August 18, 1935 Chicago, Illinois, United States
- Died: September 18, 2010 (aged 75) Oak Lawn, Illinois, United States
- Height: 185 cm (6 ft 1 in)
- Weight: 79 kg (174 lb)
- Spouse: Diann M. MacDonald

Sport
- Sport: Water polo
- College team: Northwestern University
- Club: Griffith Nadatorium; Illinois Athletic Club (IAC)
- Coached by: William Kresge (Fenger High); Sam Greller (Illinois AC); Neal Kohlhase ('56 Olympics)
Medal record
Representing United States
Pan American Games
Gold medal – first place	1959 Chicago	Men's tournament

Samuel Gene Kooistra (August 18, 1935 – September 18, 2010) was an American water polo player who attended Northwestern University and participated in the 1956 Summer Olympics in Melbourne. Kooistra later worked as a District Chief for the Chicago Fire Department.

== Early life ==
He was born in Chicago on August 18, 1935. As a youngster, he swam with the Griffith Natatorium swim team as had his brothers Bill and Don. His older brother was Olympian William Kooistra. Sam Kooistra attended Chicago's Fenger High School, now known as Fenger Academy High School. Swimming as a Senior for the Fenger High Titans, under new two-year coach William Kresge, Kooistra was part of the team that won the 20-yard City League Pool Championship in December 1952. Kresge had greatly improved the speed and size of the team, recruiting a few of Fenger's football players. Sam and his brother Bill were part of the winning four man team on the 4x100 yard freestyle relay at the Central AAU Sr. Men's Indoor Swim meet on April 10, 1953.

At 18, Kooistra placed third at the Illinois Athletic Club's 29th Two Mile Swim Marathon on August 29, 1953, with a time around 49 minutes.

== Illinois Athletic Club ==
By 1953, Kooistra played water polo for the Illinois Athletic Club, where he was coached by Sam Greller, a water polo Hall of Fame member. From 1954-56, and in 1959, 1960, and 1962 Kooistra played on the outstanding Illinois Athletic Club teams that won the Indoor National water polo championships. In 1955 and 1958, he was on the IAC water polo teams that won the Senior National Outdoor Championships in AAU competition.

== College ==
Beginning around 1953-4, Kooistra attended Wilson Junior College, and Northwestern University where he competed in swimming specializing in the 100-yard freestyle and freestyle relays.

Kooistra served as a submariner with the U.S. Navy.

== 1956 Melbourne Olympics ==
Kooistra was a member of the American water polo team which finished fifth in the 1956 Olympic water polo tournament under Head Olympic Coach Neal Kohlhase and Assistant Coach Urho Saari, both Water Polo Hall of Fame members. Kooistra played four matches. Hungary took the gold, Yugoslavia took the silver, and the Russian team captured the bronze. A well-publicized feature of the tournament was a very rough match between pre-Olympic favorite Hungary and Russia that had to be stopped by the referees. On December 6, the Hungarian team won the match 4-0, and went undefeated in the tournament, but considerable animosity existed between the Russian and Hungarian teams as a result of the recent Russian occupation of Hungary in November, 1956, subsequent to a student revolt in the same month.

In international competition, he played with the U.S. National team that finished first in the 1959 Pan American Games tournament, taking the gold medal.

=== Careers ===
In professional careers, Kooistra retired as a District Chief of the Chicago Fire Department.

Kooistra died on September 18, 2010 in Oak Lawn, Illinois in greater Chicago. He had been married to Diann M. MacDonald Koistra, a painter and artist who had also attended Fenger High School. Kooistra was pre-deceased by his wife and was survived by three sons, and grandchildren. Funeral services were held at Blake-Lamb Funeral Home and he was buried at Chapel Hill Gardens South.

=== Honors ===
In 1977, he was inducted into the USA Water Polo Hall of Fame. In more distinctive tributes, Kooistra was a twelve time All-American as a water polo player, won the Curren Award at the 1967 Indoor Nationals, and is a member of Roseland-Pullman's Sports Hall of Fame for Chicago.
