= Jim Walsh (basketball) =

American basketball player

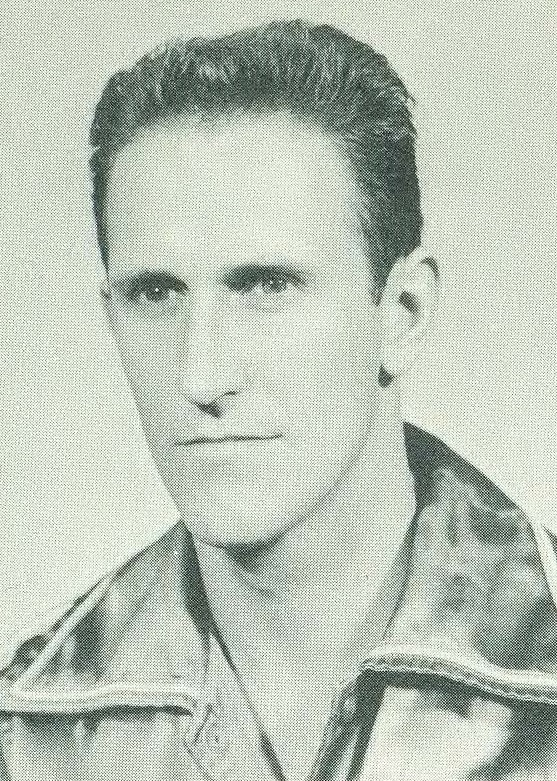
- Walsh with the Phillips 66ers.

Personal information
- Born: August 29, 1930 San Francisco, California, U.S.
- Died: March 4, 1976 (aged 45) San Francisco, California, U.S.
- Listed height: 6 ft 4 in (1.93 m)
- Listed weight: 195 lb (88 kg)

Career information
- College: Stanford (1949–1952)
- NBA draft: 1952: 12th round, 97th overall pick
- Drafted by: Baltimore Bullets
- Playing career: 1957–1958
- Position: Small forward
- Number: 20

Career history
- 1957–1958: Philadelphia Warriors

Career highlights
- Second-team All-PCC (1952)
- Stats at NBA.com
- Stats at Basketball Reference
Medals
Men's basketball
Representing the United States
Olympic Games
Gold medal – first place	1956 Melbourne	Team competition

James Patrick Walsh (August 29, 1930 – March 4, 1976) was an American basketball player.

A 6'4" forward from Stanford University, Walsh competed at the 1956 Summer Olympics, where he won a gold medal with the United States national basketball team. He then played one season (1957–1958) in the National Basketball Association as a member of the Philadelphia Warriors, averaging 2.0 points per game.

== Career statistics ==
Legend
GP	Games played	GS	Games started	MPG	Minutes per game
FG%	Field goal percentage	3P%	3-point field goal percentage	FT%	Free throw percentage
RPG	Rebounds per game	APG	Assists per game	SPG	Steals per game
BPG	Blocks per game	PPG	Points per game	**Bold**	Career high

=== NBA ===
==== Regular season ====
Year	Team	GP	MPG	FG%	FT%	RPG	APG	PPG
1957–58	Philadelphia	10	7.2	.185	.588	1.5	.8	2.0
