= Sam Greller =

American water polo player (1907–1972)

Personal information
- Full name: Samuel Joseph Greller
- Born: May 18, 1905 Chicago, United States
- Died: March 17, 1972 (aged 66) Chicago, United States
- Occupations: Swimming, WP Coach; Medals, Trophy business

Sport
- Sport: Water Polo, Swimming
- Position: Left Forward (Water Polo); Freestyle, Breast stroke (Swimming)
- College team: University of Iowa; Northwestern U. (Didn't compete)
- Club: Jewish People's Institute; Illinois Athletic Club (IAC)
- Coached by: Bill Bachrach (IAC, Olympics)

Samuel Joseph Greller (May 18, 1905 – March 17, 1972) was an American water polo player and swimmer who competed for the Illinois Athletic Club and participated in water polo at the 1928 Summer Olympics in Amsterdam. He later coached swimming and water polo for the Illinois Athletic Club beginning in 1948, and was a manager for the U.S. water polo team at the 1956 Melbourne Olympics.

Greller was born May 18, 1905, in Chicago Illinois, and began swimming by the age of six, winning a city-wide championship in grade school. Among the clubs he swam for included the Jewish People's Institute (JPI) which he represented by 1922, and for which he also coached. Greller in his youth attempted a few open water, long distance swims but soon confined his swimming competition to indoor pools. He later represented the Illinois Athletic Club where he competed by 1924 and likely received coaching from Head swimming and water polo Coach Bill Bachrach. He attended Crane High School in Chicago.

== Olympics ==
Greller earned a berth as an alternate in the 1924 Olympics but could not raise the $500 required to attend the championship. His Illinois Athletic Club Coach, Bill Backrach, served as Head Olympic coach for the U.S. swimming and water polo teams that year.

Greller played water polo on the 1928 U.S. Amsterdam Olympic team, participating in all three matches where he was again managed by Olympic swimming and water polo Head Coach Bill Bachrach. The team from Germany won the gold, Hungary won the silver medal, and France won the bronze. After receiving a bye in the first round, the American team had to play the elite first place globally rated team from Hungary, that soundly defeated the U.S. team 5–0, shutting them out. The Hungarians eventually won the silver medal as noted, while the U.S. team lost to France 2–1 and ultimately finished with a tie for fifth place.

=== College ===
He attended and competed for the University of Iowa where, as a freshman in 1926 as part of the Hawkeye Institute, he won both the 220- and 440-yard swim events at the University of Iowa All University swimming tournament. He later attended Northwestern University.

Greller's primary source of training and competition was with the Illinois Athletic Club. He played on several IAC water polo teams that won National Championships including the National Outdoor Championships in 1959, 1951, 1954, 1956, and 1958.

== Coach and administrator ==
Greller first began coaching swimming and water polo for Chicago's Jewish People's Institute in the 1930s. He swam and played water polo for the Illinois Athletic Club, and while acting as their coach, beginning in 1948, was a mentor to both outstanding swimmers and water polo players, which included 1936 Olympian Adolph Kiefer, 1948 Olympians Ralph Budelman and Harold Dash, 1952 and 1956 Olympian William Kooistra, and brother Sam Kooistra and 1936 and 1948 Olympian Jerry Miller. While coaching the IAC from roughly 1948 to 1960, Greller may have been partly mentored by long serving IAC Coach Bill Bachrach, whom he greatly admired. He coached several IAC Senior National Indoor championship teams that included the years 1960, 1959, 1958, 1956, 1954, 1951, 1950, 1949, and 1948.

In international coaching and management, Greller was a coach to the 1959 Pan American team, which captured a gold medal, America's first international gold medal.

After his elite athletic career in the 1928 Olympics, in addition to coaching, he served as a water polo administrator and helped to manage the US Olympic water polo team in 1956 in Melbourne. He stressed that American water polo teams needed to become accustomed to playing in outdoor pools, which tended to be larger, rather than becoming exclusively used to playing in indoor pools, which were most common in American water polo competition.

Greller served as a water polo referee for the Big Ten Conference in NCAA competition and was a referee at the 1956 Melbourne Olympic games. He also operated his own medals and trophy business for Sports, known a Sam Greller, Inc.

Greller died on March 17, 1972, in Chicago, Illinois with services held at Weinstein and Sons Chapel on Chicago's Peterson Avenue. He was survived by his wife Go, a daughter, a son, and grandchildren, and was buried on March 20 at Westlawn Cemetery. Greller had undergone a lengthy open-heart surgery that year.

=== Honors ===
In 1976, he was inducted into the USA Water Polo Hall of Fame. He served as a member of the U.S. Olympic Water Polo Committee, and the AAU National Water Polo Committee for around fifteen years. In 1955–56, he was active in the U.S. Olympians Midwest Chapter and served as President. In a rarer honor, he was inducted into Swimming Hall of Fame for the Helms foundation.
