= Bill Hougland =

American basketball player (1930–2017)

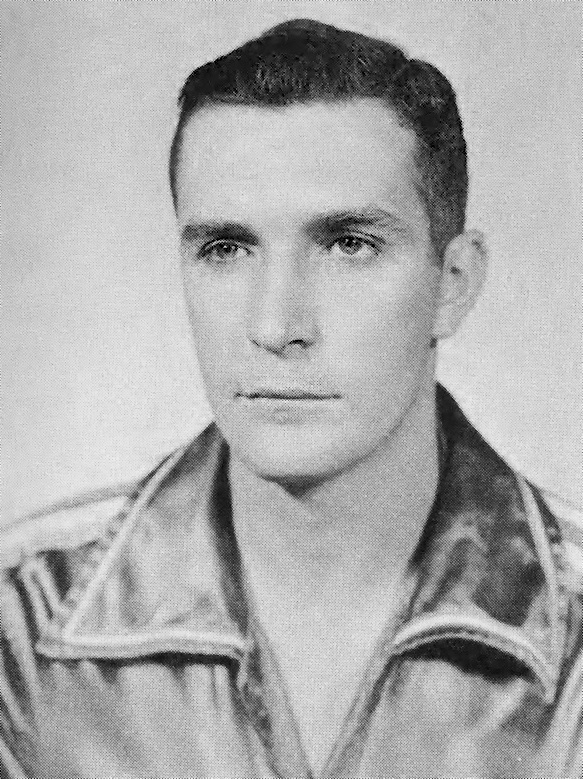
- Hougland with the Phillips 66ers.

Personal information
- Born: June 20, 1930 Caldwell, Kansas, U.S.
- Died: March 6, 2017 (aged 86) Lawrence, Kansas, U.S.
- Listed height: 6 ft 4 in (1.93 m)
- Listed weight: 190 lb (86 kg)

Career information
- High school: Beloit (Beloit, Kansas)
- College: Kansas (1949–1952)
- NBA draft: 1952: undrafted
- Position: Point guard

Career history
- 1952–1958: Phillips 66ers

Career highlights
- NCAA champion (1952); AAU champion (1955)
Medals
Men's basketball
Representing the United States
Olympic Games
| Gold medal – first place | 1952 Helsinki | Team competition |
| Gold medal – first place | 1956 Melbourne | Team competition |

William Marion Hougland (June 20, 1930 – March 6, 2017) was an American basketball player who competed in the 1952 Summer Olympics and in the 1956 Summer Olympics. He was also a member of the Kansas Jayhawks' 1952 NCAA Men's Basketball National Championship team.

He was a member of the 1952 American basketball team, which won the gold medal. He played all eight matches. He played for the Phillips 66ers in the National Industrial Basketball League. He won his second gold medal as part of the 1956 American Olympic team.

Hougland died on March 6, 2017, in Lawrence, Kansas, aged 86.
