= Robert Jeangerard =

American basketball player (1933–2014)

Personal information
- Born: June 20, 1933 Evanston, Illinois, U.S.
- Died: July 5, 2014 (aged 81) Belmont, California, U.S.
- Listed height: 6 ft 3 in (1.91 m)
- Listed weight: 190 lb (86 kg)

Career information
- High school: New Trier (Winnetka, Illinois)
- College: Colorado (1953–1955)
- NBA draft: 1955: undrafted
- Position: Forward
Medals
Men's basketball
Representing the United States
Olympic Games
| Gold medal – first place | 1956 Melbourne | Team competition |
Pan American Games
| Gold medal – first place | 1959 Chicago | Team competition |

Robert Eugene Jeangerard (June 20, 1933 – July 5, 2014) was an American basketball player who competed in the 1956 Summer Olympics. Born in Evanston, Illinois, Jeangerard played collegiately at the University of Colorado. He then played for the Phillips 66ers in the NIBL (National Industrial Basketball League). The Phillips 66ers won the Olympic Trials in 1956, and Jeangerard was one of five players from the Phillips 66ers selected for the 1956 Olympic team, along with their coach, Gerald Tucker. Bill Russell and K.C.Jones, two-time NCAA Champions from the University of San Francisco, were also on the 1956 Olympic team, which won the gold medal.

Jeangerard also served in the U.S. Air Force, started his own chain of tire stores, became a lawyer for his stores, and started the Jeangerard Foundation which raised money for national parks.

A long-time resident of San Carlos, California, Jeangerard died on July 5, 2014, after a long battle with Alzheimer's disease.
