= Burdette Haldorson =

American basketball player (1934–2023)

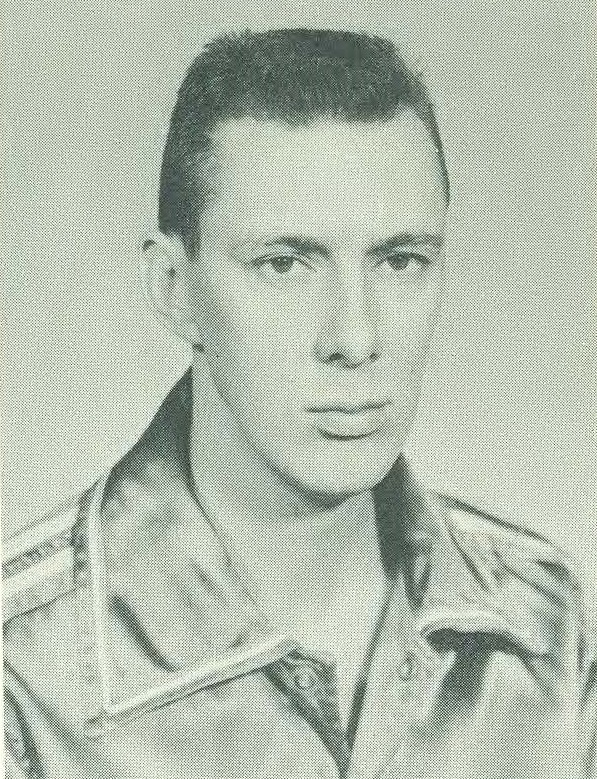
- Haldorson with the Phillips 66ers

Personal information
- Born: January 12, 1934 Austin, Minnesota, U.S.
- Died: October 13, 2023 (aged 89) Colorado Springs, Colorado, U.S.
- Listed height: 6 ft 9 in (2.06 m)
- Listed weight: 225 lb (102 kg)

Career information
- High school: Austin (Austin, Minnesota)
- College: Colorado (1951–1955)
- NBA draft: 1955: 4th round, 23rd overall pick
- Drafted by: St. Louis Hawks
- Position: Forward
- Number: 22

Career history
- 1955: Luckett-Nix Clippers
- 1955–1960: Phillips 66ers

Career highlights
- 2x First-team All-Big Seven (1954, 1955); 4x AAU All-American (1955, 1956, 1958, 1959); No. 22 retired by Colorado Buffaloes
- Stats at Basketball Reference
Medals
Men's basketball
Representing the United States
Olympic Games
Gold medal – first place	1956 Melbourne	Team competition
Gold medal – first place	1960 Rome	Team competition
Pan American Games
Gold medal – first place	1959 Chicago

Burdette Eliele "Burdie" Haldorson (January 12, 1934 – October 13, 2023) was an American basketball player who competed in the 1956 Summer Olympics and in the 1960 Summer Olympics. Haldorson played college basketball for the Colorado Buffaloes.

Haldorson was part of the American basketball team that won the gold medal in 1956. He never played professionally, but was a member of the AAU Phillips 66ers for a number of years.

Four years later, in 1960, he won his second gold medal as part of the American team. He was inducted into the Pac-12 Basketball Hall of Honor during the 2012 Pac-12 Conference men's basketball tournament, March 10, 2012.

Haldorson died in Colorado Springs on October 13, 2023, at the age of 89.
