= Gilbert Ford =

American basketball player and business executive

Personal information
- Born: September 14, 1931 Tulia, Texas, U.S.
- Died: January 10, 2017 (aged 85)
Medal record
Men's basketball
Representing the United States
Olympic Games
Gold medal – first place	1956 Melbourne	Team competition

Gilbert "Gib" Ford (September 14, 1931 – January 10, 2017) was an American basketball player and business executive, who competed in the 1956 Summer Olympics as part of the American basketball team, which won the gold medal. Born in Tulia, Texas, he played college basketball at the University of Texas. He worked for thirty-five years at Converse, Inc., ultimately becoming the company's chairman and CEO.

Ford played for Amarillo High School. In 1950 he was a Texas High School All State player and a participant in the Texas High School All Star Game. His name is enshrined in the Texas High School Basketball Hall of Fame. Following High School, Ford played basketball for the University of Texas from 1950 to 1954, and was co-captain of the team his senior year, when the team was a co-champion of the Southwest Conference. He was named to various All-SWC teams and took part in the 1954 Shrine East/West College All Star Game in Kansas City. In 1986, he was inducted into the University of Texas Longhorn Hall of Honor.

After graduation from Texas in 1954, where he was also a member of Phi Kappa Psi fraternity, Ford was a starter for the famous Phillips 66 Oilers, which won the National AAU Championship in 1955, and the National Industrial Basketball League Championship in 1955 and 1958. While serving in the Air Force, Ford played on the 1956 All Air Force Team and the All Armed Forces Team, which qualified for the 1956 Olympic trials.

In August 1994, Ford was appointed chairman of the board and CEO of Converse, Inc. He retired December 1, 1996 after 35 years of service with the company. Ford first joined Converse as a member of the sales staff in 1961, and served in a number of executive capacities before becoming president of the company in 1986.

Ford was affiliated with several sporting goods and footwear manufacturers' organizations. He served two terms, 1982–85 and 1991–93, as the chairman of the board of the Sporting Goods Manufacturers Association (SGMA). He was instrumental in creating the industry's first Super Show in 1986, the world's largest sporting goods trade show. He also was a member of the boards of directors of the World Federation of the Sporting Goods Industry, the Two/Ten Foundation, the Footwear Industries of America, the Rubber and Plastic Footwear Manufacturers Association, the New England Sports Hall of Fame, and the Naismith Memorial Basketball Hall of Fame. He served a six-year term as a member of the board of trustees for Gettysburg College in Gettysburg, Pennsylvania.
