= National Industrial Basketball League =

U.S. amateur basketball league (1947–1961)

- Sport: Basketball
- Founded: 1947
- Folded: 1963
- No. of teams: 25
- Country: United States
- Last champion: Cleveland Pipers (1st title)
- Most titles: Phillips 66ers (11)

The National Industrial Basketball League was founded in 1947 to enable U.S. mill workers a chance to compete in basketball. The league was founded by the industrial teams (teams sponsored by the large companies and made up of their employees) belonging to the National Basketball League (NBL) that did not join the National Basketball Association when the NBL merged with the Basketball Association of America.

The NIBL teams participated every year in the AAU National tournament against teams from other amateur or semi-professional leagues.

== League history ==
The league's inaugural year, 1947–48, featured five teams in an eight-game schedule—the Milwaukee Harnischfegers (which won the round robin schedule with an 8–0 record), Peoria Caterpillars, Milwaukee Allen-Bradleys, Akron Goodyear Wingfoots, and Fort Wayne General Electrics. The following season (1948–1949), with a 16-game schedule, the new lineup was league champion Bartlesville Phillips 66ers (15-1 record), Denver Chevvies, Peoria Caterpillars, Akron Goodyears/Akron Goodyear Wingfoots, and Milwaukee Allen-Bradleys.

In the 1949–50 season, with the addition of the Dayton Industrialists making the league a six-team circuit, the Phillips 66ers repeated as champions. The league expanded again in the 1950–51 season to eight teams, adding the (Oakland Blue 'n Gold Atlas) and San Francisco Stewart Chevrolets. The Dayton team renamed as the Dayton Air Gems, and the Phillips 66ers repeated for their third consecutive title.

=== High point of league expansion ===
The league expanded to 11 teams, in 1951-52 with such new teams as the Los Angeles Fibber McGee & Mollys, Artesia REA Travelers, and Santa Maria Golden Dukes. The 66ers just edged the Oakland Atlas-Pacific Engineers and the San Francisco Stewart Chevrolets for their fourth title, with a 17–5 record to their opponents 16-6 records that tied for second. The next season (1952-53), the league dropped down to nine teams, but saw new opponents in the Houston Ada Oilers and the Los Angeles Kirby's Shoes. The 66ers beat the Caterpillars for the title by one game, with a 13–3 record.

The Peoria Cats tied the 66ers for the 1953-54 title, each with a 10–4 record. The next two seasons, the 66ers and the Cats took first and second respectively. A new team in the greatly reduced circuit of five teams in 1955-56 was the Wichita Vickers.

The 1956-57 season was one of the most competitive in the NIBL history. While the 66ers again took first with a 13–7 record, four teams tied for second with 11-9 records, including the newly added Denver-Chicago Truckers. This proved to be the last season for the Milwaukee Allen-Bradleys, who finished last for the seventh time with a 3–17 record.

The 1957–58 season saw the Vickers move to the forefront, tying the 66ers for the league title with a 21–9 record. A new team that year was the Kansas City Kaycee's.

=== End of the Phillips 66ers winning streak ===
In the 1958–59 season, the 66ers failed to take the league title for the first time since their coming to the league, finishing in third place. The Truckers finished first with a 21–9 record, with the Vickers runner-up at 19–11. Joining the league that season was the Seattle Buchan Bakers. However, in the 1959–60 season, the 66ers regained their title as league champions.

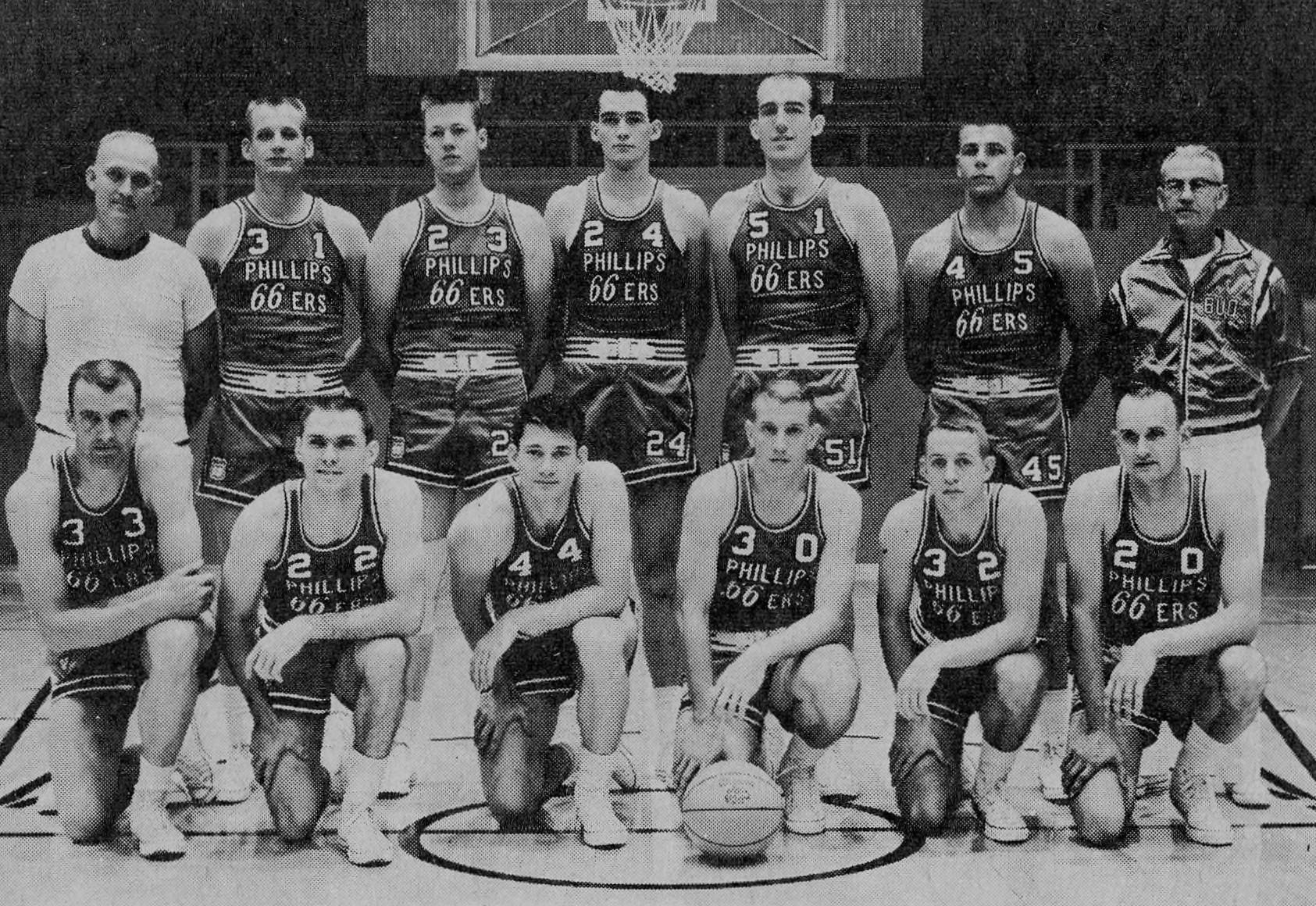
The 1963–64 Phillips 66ers, from left to right: [standing] Don Watkins (team manager), Jerry Shipp, Ken Charlton, Jim Hagan, Mike Moran, Terry Cerkvenik, Bud Browning, [kneeling] Ken Saylors, Del Ray Mounts, Denny Price, Larry Pursiful, Charlie Bowerman and Bob Turner.

=== Demise ===
By the early 1960s, NIBL teams were increasingly struggling to compete with the salaries offered in professional league. Top college graduates increasingly gravitated to the NBA, and the NIBL began to decline in popularity and profitability. This is evidenced by the disbandment of the Peoria Cats at the end of the 1959–60 season.

In the NIBL's final season, 1960–61, the league had dropped down to only six members divided into two divisions, Eastern (Cleveland Pipers, Akron Goodyears, New York Tuck Tapers) and Western (Denver-Chicago Truckers, Phillips 66ers, and Seattle Buchan Bakers). Instead of the round-robin schedule determining a winner, the league sponsored a four-team playoff. The Pipers beat the Truckers for the championship, 136–100. The 66ers beat the Goodyears for in a match for third place, 114–112.

In 1961, the league dropped their industrial sponsors and merged with other amateur leagues to form the National Alliance of Basketball Leagues (NABL). The Pipers and the Tapers left to join the newly formed American Basketball League in 1961.

== An amateur league ==
In the 1950s the salaries were about the same as the NBA and there was a job for all players in their companies. Some of them ended up being president of their companies, working there for a lifetime. Most of players wanted no part of the uncertain professional game, and instead were accepting a position with the companies, rejecting offers even from NBA.

The NIBL was dedicated to remaining amateur at a time when basketball was desperately trying to carve out some postwar space in the pro sports landscape. However, professional basketball staggered forward and the NIBL continued to flourish for a time, mostly because its stability allowed companies to poach stars such as Bob Kurland.

The NIBL merged with other AAU leagues and reorganized into the National AAU Basketball League (NABL) in 1961.

== Notable alumni ==
=== Basketball Hall of Fame alumni ===
- Don Barksdale (Oakland Blue 'n Gold Atlas) Inducted, 2012
- Bob Boozer (Peoria Caterpillars) Inducted, 2016
- Larry Brown (Akron Goodyears) Inducted, 2002
- Ace Gruenig (Denver Chevvies) Inducted, 1963
- Alex Hannum (Coach, Wichita Vickers) Inducted, 1998
- Gus Johnson (Cleveland Pipers) Inducted, 2010
- Bob Kurland (Bartlesville Phillips 66ers) Inducted, 1961
- Clyde Lovellette (Bartlesville Phillips 66ers) Inducted, 1988
- Hank Luisetti (Coach, Denver Chevvies & Coach, San Francisco Stewart Chevrolets) Inducted, 1959
- John McLendon (Coach, Cleveland Pipers) Inducted, 1979 and 2016
- George Yardley (San Francisco Stewart Chevrolets) Inducted, 1996

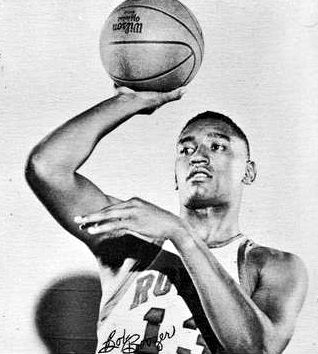
Hall of Famer Bob Boozer

=== Future NBA/ABA All-Stars ===
- Don Barksdale (Oakland Bittners|Oakland Blue 'n Gold Atlas)
- Dick Barnett (Cleveland Pipers)
- Vince Boryla (Denver Chevvies)
- Bob Boozer (Peoria Caterpillars)
- Larry Brown (Akron Goodyears)
- Gus Johnson (Cleveland Pipers)
- Clyde Lovellette (Bartlesville Phillips 66ers)
- Tom Meschery (San Francisco Stewart Chevrolets)
- Chuck Noble (Akron Goodyears)
- Don Ohl (Peoria Caterpillars)
- Lee Shaffer (Cleveland Pipers)
- Ben Warley (Cleveland Pipers)
- George Yardley (San Francisco Stewart Chevrolets)

=== Olympic players and coaches ===
- Don Barksdale (Oakland Blue 'n Gold Atlas) 1948 Olympic Team Gold Medal
- Lew Beck (Phillips 66ers) 1948 Olympic Team Gold Medal
- George Bon Salle (Denver-Chicago Truckers) 1959 Pan American Games Gold Medal
- Ron Bontemps (Peoria Caterpillars) 1952 Olympic Team Gold Medal
- Bob Boozer (Peoria Caterpillars) 1959 Pan American Games Gold Medal, 1960 Olympic Team Gold Medal
- B.H. Born (Peoria Caterpillars) 1954 FIBA USA Team Gold Medal
- Dick Boushka (Wichita Vickers) 1956 Olympic Team Gold Medal
- Vince Boryla (Denver Chevvies) 1948 Olympic Team Gold Medal
- Larry Brown (Akron Goodyears) 1964 Olympic Team Gold Medal
- Omar Browning (Coach, Bartlesville Phillips 66ers), Head Coach, 1948 United States men's Olympic basketball team Gold Medal
- Gordon Carpenter (Phillips 66ers) 1948 Olympic Team Gold Medal
- Dick Davies (Akron Goodyears) 1964 Olympic Team Gold Medal
- Chuck Darling (Phillips 66ers) 1956 Olympic Team Gold Medal
- Marc Freiberger (Peoria Caterpillars & Houston Ada Oilers) 1952 Olympic Team Gold Medal
- Wayne Glasgow (Phillips 66ers) 1952 Olympic Team gold medal
- Don Goldstein (New York Tuck Tapers) 1959 Pan American Games Gold Medal
- Burdie Haldorson (Phillips 66ers) 1956 Olympic Team Gold Medal, 1960 Olympic Team Gold Medal
- Bill Hougland (Phillips 66ers) 1956 Olympic Team Gold Medal
- Robert Jeangerard (Phillips 66ers) 1956 Olympic Team Gold Medal
- Gene Johnson (Coach, Kansas City Kaycees & Seattle Buchan Bakers) Head Coach, 1936 United States men's Olympic basketball team Gold Medal
- Allen Kelley (Peoria Caterpillars) 1960 Olympic Team Gold Medal
- Bob Kurland (Phillips 66ers) 1948 Olympic Team Gold Medal, 1952 Olympic Team Gold Medal
- Lester Lane (Wichita Vickers) 1960 Olympic Team Gold Medal
- Clyde Lovellette (Phillips 66ers) 1956 Olympic Team Gold Medal
- Frank McCabe (Peoria Caterpillars) 1952 Olympic Team Gold Medal
- Pete McCaffrey (Akron Goodyears) 1964 Olympic Team Gold Medal
- Art Mollner (Coach, Los Angeles Fibber McGee and Mollys) 1936 Olympic Team Gold Medal
- Dan Pippin (Peoria Caterpillars) 1952 Olympic Team Gold Medal
- R. C. Pitts (Phillips 66ers) 1948 Olympic Team Gold Medal
- Jesse Renick (Phillips 66ers) 1948 Olympic Team Gold Medal
- Jerry Shipp (Phillips 66ers) 1964 Olympic Team Gold Medal
- Charlie Slack (Akron Goodyears) 1960 Olympic Team Gold Medal (alternate)
- Adrian Smith (Akron Goodyears) 1960 Olympic Team Gold Medal
- Johnny Stanich (Phillips 66ers, Denver Chevrolets, Denver Central Bankers) 1950 FIBA USA Team Silver Medal
- Dan Swartz (Wichita Vickers) 1959 Pan American Games Gold Medal
- Gary Thompson (Phillips 66ers) 1959 Pan American Games Gold Medal
- Ron Tomsic (San Francisco Stewart Chevrolets) 1956 Olympic Team Gold Medal
- Gerald Tucker (Phillips 66ers) 1956 Olympic Team Gold Medal
- Jim Walsh (Phillips 66ers) 1956 Team Olympic Gold Medal
- Howie Williams (Peoria Caterpillars) 1952 Olympic Gold Medal
- Warren Womble (Coach, Peoria Caterpillars) Head Coach, 1952 United States men's Olympic basketball team, Gold Medal

=== Other notable alumni ===
- Bud Adams (Owner, Houston Ada Oilers)
- Jim Ashmore (Denver-Chicago Truckers)
- Joe Belmont (Denver-Chicago Truckers)
- Al Bunge (Bartlesville Phillips 66ers)
- Art Bunte (Denver-Chicago Truckers)
- Bill Calhoun (Oakland Blue 'n Gold Atlas)
- Ken Charlton (Denver-Chicago Truckers)
- Gene Conley (Washington Tapers)
- Johnny Cox (Cleveland Pipers), (Akron Goodyears)
- Howie Crittenden (Peoria Caterpillars)
- Johnny Dee (Coach, Denver-Chicago Truckers)
- Billy Donovan Sr. (Los Angeles Fibber McGee & Mollys)
- Chuck Hanger (Oakland Blue 'n Gold Atlas)
- Jerry Harper (Bartlesville Phillips 66ers), Houston Ada Oilers
- Swede Halbrook (Wichita Vickers)
- Phil Jordon (Seattle Buchan Bakers)
- George King (Bartlesville Phillips 66ers)
- Ron Livingstone (Oakland Blue 'n Gold Atlas)
- Bill Logan (Denver-Chicago Truckers)
- Dave Minor (Denver Chevvies)
- Bill Morris (Coach, Buchan Bakers)
- Red Murrell (Bartlesville Phillips 66ers)
- Paul Neumann (New York Tuck Tapers)
- Jim Palmer (Dayton Industrials)
- Bobby Plump (Bartlesville Phillips 66ers), movie Hoosiers
- Ken Pryor (Bartlesville Phillips 66ers)
- Terry Rand (Denver-Chicago Truckers)
- Hank Rosenstein (Coach, New York Tuck Tapers)
- Harv Schmidt (Denver-Chicago Truckers)
- Lloyd Sharrar (Cleveland Pipers, Akron Wingfoots)
- Arnold Short (Bartlesville Phillips 66ers)
- Glen Smith (Denver Central Bankers)
- George Steinbrenner (Owner, Cleveland Pipers)
- Jack Stone (Los Angeles Fibber McGee & Mollys)
- Stan Stutz (Coach, New York Tuck Tapers)
- Rolland Todd (Buchan Bakers)
- Bumper Tormohlen (Cleveland Pipers)
- Hank Vaughn (Coach, Akron Goodyears)
- Ed Voss (Oakland Blue 'n Gold Atlas)
- Hoarce Walker (Denver-Chicago Truckers)
- Walt Walowac (Akron Wingfoots)
- Bus Whitehead (Bartlesville Phillips 66ers)
- Gene Wiley (Denver-Chicago Truckers)
- Andy Wolfe (San Francisco Stewart Chevrolets)

== Teams ==
- Akron Goodyear Wingfoots/Akron Goodyears (1947–1961)
- Bartlesville Phillips 66ers (1948–1961)
- Milwaukee Allen-Bradleys (1947–1957)
- Artesia REA Travelers/Artesia CVE Travelers (1951–1955)
- Cleveland Pipers (1959–1961)
- Dayton Air-Gems (1950–1952)
- Dayton Industrials (1949–1950)
- Denver Chevvies (1948–1951)
- Denver Central Bankers (1951–1955)
- Denver D-C Truckers (1956–1961)
- Fort Wayne General Electrics (1947–1948)
- Houston Ada Oilers (1952–1955)
- Kansas City Kaycees (1957–1958)
- Los Angeles Fibber McGee & Mollys (1951–1952)
- Los Angeles Kirby's Shoes (1952–1953)
- Milwaukee Harnischfegers (1947–1948)
- Peoria Caterpillars (1947–1960)
- New York Tuck Tapers (1959–1961)
- Oakland Blue 'n Gold Atlas (1950–1951)
- Oakland Atlas-Pacific Engineers (1951–1952)
- San Francisco Investors (1959–1960)
- San Francisco Stewart Chevrolets (1950–1952)
- Santa Maria Golden Dukes (1951–1954)
- Seattle Buchan Bakers (1958–1961)
- Wichita Vickers (1955–1960)

== List of champions ==
- 1947–48 Milwaukee Harnischfegers
- 1948–49 Bartlesville Phillips 66ers
- 1949–50 Bartlesville Phillips 66ers
- 1950–51 Bartlesville Phillips 66ers
- 1951–52 Bartlesville Phillips 66ers
- 1952–53 Bartlesville Phillips 66ers
- 1953–54 Bartlesville Phillips 66ers and Peoria Cats
- 1954–55 Bartlesville Phillips 66ers
- 1955–56 Bartlesville Phillips 66ers
- 1956–57 Bartlesville Phillips 66ers
- 1957–58 Phillips 66ers and Wichita Vickers
- 1958–59 Denver-Chicago Truckers
- 1959–60 Bartlesville Phillips 66ers
- 1960–61 Cleveland Pipers

== All-Star Game ==
- 1958, Peoria: East - West 113-104
- 1959, Denver: East - West 81-78

== Standings (1947–1948 to 1960–1961) ==
1947–1948 season
Team	Wins	Losses	Win Pct.
Milwaukee Harnischfegers	8	0	1.000
Caterpillar Diesels	5	3	.625
Milwaukee Allen-Bradleys	4	4	.500
Akron Goodyear Wingfoots	3	5	.375
Fort Wayne General Electrics	0	8	.000

1948–1949 season
Team	Wins	Losses	Win Pct.
Bartlesville Phillips 66ers	15	1	.938
Denver Chevvies	11	5	.688
Caterpillar Diesels	8	8	.500
Akron Goodyear Wingfoots	4	12	.250
Milwaukee Allen-Bradleys	2	14	.125

1949–1950 season
Team	Wins	Losses	Win Pct.
Bartlesville Phillips 66ers	9	1	.900
Caterpillar Diesels	7	3	.700
Denver Chevvies	5	5	.500
Akron Goodyear Wingfoots	3	7	.300
Dayton Industrialists	3	7	.300
Milwaukee Allen-Bradleys	2	14	.125

1950–1951 season
Team	Wins	Losses	Win Pct.
Bartlesville Phillips 66ers	22	3	.888
Oakland Blue 'n Gold Atlas	11	6	.647
San Francisco Stewart Chevrolets	12	8	.600
Caterpillar Diesels	15	13	.538
Akron Goodyear Wingfoots	5	8	.385
Dayton Air Gems	5	12	.294
Denver Chevvies	5	14	.263
Milwaukee Allen-Bradleys	1	12	.077

1951–1952 season
Team	Wins	Losses	Win Pct.
Bartlesville Phillips 66ers	17	5	.773
Oakland Atlas-Pacific Engineers	16	6	.727
San Francisco Stewart Chevrolets	16	6	.727
Caterpillar Diesels	13	9	.591
Akron Goodyear Wingfoots	12	10	.545
Los Angeles Fibber McGee & Mollys	9	13	.409
Artesia REA Travelers	9	13	.409
Denver Central Bankers	8	14	.364
Santa Maria Golden Dukes	8	14	.364
Dayton Air-Gems	7	15	.318
Milwaukee Allen-Bradleys	5	17	.227

1952–1953 season
Team	Wins	Losses	Win Pct.
Phillips 66ers	13	3	.812
Peoria Cats	12	4	.750
Santa Maria Golden Dukes	10	6	.625
Akron Goodyear Wingfoots	9	7	.562
Houston Ada Oilers	8	8	.500
Los Angeles Kirby's Shoes	7	9	.438
Denver Central Bankers	6	10	.375
Milwaukee Allen-Bradleys	5	11	.312
Artesia REA Travelers	2	14	.125

1953–1954 season
Team	Wins	Losses	Win Pct.
Phillips 66ers	10	4	.714
Peoria Cats	10	4	.714
Akron Goodyear Wingfoots	9	5	.643
Denver Central Bankers	9	5	.643
Santa Maria Golden Dukes	7	7	.500
Artesia CVE Travelers	4	10	.286
Houston Ada Oilers	4	10	.286
Milwaukee Allen-Bradleys	3	11	.214

1954–1955 season
Team	Wins	Losses	Win Pct.
Phillips 66ers	19	5	.792
Peoria Cats	16	8	.667
Denver Central Bankers	12	12	.500
Houston Ada Oilers	12	12	.500
Milwaukee Allen-Bradleys	10	14	.417
Artesia CVE Travelers	8	16	.333
Akron CVE Travelers	7	17	.292

1955–1956 season
Team	Wins	Losses	Win Pct.
Phillips 66ers	16	8	.667
Peoria Cats	15	9	.625
Wichita Vickers	15	9	.625
Akron Goodyear Wingfoots	9	15	.375
Milwaukee Allen-Bradleys	5	19	.208

1956–1957 season
Team	Wins	Losses	Win Pct.
Phillips 66ers	13	7	.650
Akron Goodyear Wingfoots	11	9	.550
Denver Denver-Chicago Truckers	11	9	.550
Peoria Cats	11	9	.550
Wichita Vickers	11	9	.550
Milwaukee Allen-Bradleys	3	17	.150

1957–1958 season
Team	Wins	Losses	Win Pct.
Phillips 66ers	21	9	.700
Wichita Vickers	21	9	.700
Denver Denver-Chicago Truckers	16	14	.533
Akron Goodyear Wingfoots	15	15	.500
Peoria Cats	15	15	.500
Kansas City Kaycees	2	28	.064

1958–1959 season
Team	Wins	Losses	Win Pct.
Denver Denver-Chicago Truckers	21	9	.700
Wichita Vickers	19	11	.633
Phillips 66ers	15	15	.500
Akron Wingfoots	13	17	.433
Peoria Cats	12	18	.400
Seattle Buchan Bakers	10	20	.333

1959–1960 season
Team	Wins	Losses	Win Pct.
Phillips 66ers	24	8	.750
Wichita Vickers	22	10	.688
Akron Wingfoots	18	14	.563
Cleveland Pipers	16	16	.500
Peoria Cats	16	16	.500
San Francisco Investors	15	17	.469
Seattle Buchan Bakers	14	18	.438
Denver Denver-Chicago Truckers	12	20	.375
New York Tuck Tapers	7	25	.219

1960–1961 season
Team	Wins	Losses	Win Pct.
Eastern Division			
Cleveland Pipers	24	10	.706
Akron Goodyears	15	19	.441
New York Tuck Tapers	15	19	.441
Western Division			
Denver Denver-Chicago Truckers	22	12	.647
Bartlesville Phillips 66ers	16	18	.471
Seattle Buchan Bakers	10	24	.294
Playoffs
Championship Game		Cleveland 136, Denver 100	
Consolation Game		Bartlesville 114, Akron 112	

== Team profiles ==
Division	Team	City	Arena	Capacity	Club	Founded	NIBL Years	NIBL Titles
National Industrial Basketball League
	Akron Goodyear Wingfoots	Akron, Ohio	Akron Goodyear Hall	5,000	1918		1947–1961	–
	Phillips 66ers	Bartlesville, Oklahoma	Bartlesville High School Gym and Phillips Gymnasium	1,400 and 2,600	1925		1948–1961	11
	Peoria Caterpillars	Peoria, Illinois	Robertson Memorial Field House	8,300	1937		1947–1960	1
	Fort Wayne General Electrics	Fort Wayne, Indiana	North Side High School Gym	3,000	1935		1947–1948	–
	Buchan Bakers	Seattle, Washington	Seattle Civic Auditorium	2,963	1948		1948–1961	–
	Houston Ada Oilers	Houston, Texas	Jeppesen Gymnasium	2,500	1952		1952–1955	–
	Oakland Bittners	Oakland, California	?	?	1941		1950–1952	–
	Wichita Vickers	Wichita, Kansas	Wichita Civic Auditorium	?	1955		1955–1960	–
	Cleveland Pipers	Cleveland, Ohio	Cleveland Arena	10,000	1959		1959–1961	1

== See also ==
- List of AAU men's basketball champions
- National Alliance of Basketball Leagues
- American Basketball League (1925–1955)
