= Ron Bontemps =

American basketball player (1926–2017)

- Bontemps at Beloit College

Personal information
- Born: August 11, 1926 Taylorville, Illinois, U.S.
- Died: May 13, 2017 (aged 90) Peoria, Illinois, U.S.
- Listed height: 6 ft 2 in (1.88 m)
- Listed weight: 174 lb (79 kg)

Career information
- High school: Taylorville (Taylorville, Illinois)
- College: Illinois (1946–1947); Beloit (1948–1951)
- NBA draft: 1951: 3rd round, 21st overall pick
- Drafted by: Tri-Cities Blackhawks
- Position: Guard

Career history
- 1951–1954: Peoria Caterpillars

Career highlights
- 2× AAU All-American (1953, 1954)
- Stats at Basketball Reference
Medals
Men's basketball
Representing the United States
Olympic Games
Gold medal – first place	1952 Helsinki	Team competition

Ronald Yngve Bontemps (August 11, 1926 – May 13, 2017) was an American basketball player who competed in the 1952 Summer Olympics. He was born in Taylorville, Illinois, and attended Beloit College. He was a captain of the United States men's basketball team, which won the gold medal in the 1952 Olympic Games. He played in all eight games. Bontemps died on May 13, 2017, in Peoria, Illinois, aged 90.

== Early life ==
Born in Taylorville, Illinois on August 11, 1926, to Carl and Katherine (McBride), Ron Bontemps attended Taylorville High School. Bontemps grew up a few blocks from childhood friend and teammate Johnny Orr, who would later embark on a storied collegiate coaching career.

At Taylorville High School, Bontemps was a First-Team All-State player, as was Johnny Orr. Taylorville had a 45–0 streak and won the 1944 Illinois high school state championship under Coach Dolph Stanley. In the championship game, a 56–33 victory over Elgin High School, Bontemps was the leading scorer, scoring 18 points, with Orr adding 17. He was selected to the All- State Tournament First Team. In the four state tournament games, Orr scored 64 points and Bontemps added 49 points. In the State Tournament, Taylorville defeated East St. Louis High School, Kewanee High School, and Champaign High School (for a fourth time). “Teams like this come along once every 100 years.” said Coach Stanley of his squad. Orr reflected many years later, “Years later, I look back and realize we were the first unbeaten state champion. How the hell did we ever do it? You don’t realize it until much later, what a helluva thing it was.”

== College career ==
After high school graduation in 1944, Bontemps joined the U.S. Army and served in World War II. After being discharged in 1946, he attended the University of Illinois, joining Orr in playing for the Fighting Illini in 1946–1947. After one year at Illinois, his high school coach Dolph Stanley, was coaching at Beloit College and recruited Bontemps and Orr to attend Beloit College. At Beloit, Bontemps and Orr joined high school teammates Donald “Red” Janssen, and Fran Stahr on the Beloit roster.

“It was never about individuals on that team,” Bontemps said of the Beloit teams. “We played fast and (Coach) Stanley made sure we were all in great condition. During timeouts, we never sat down. We mowed down a lot of teams. That was a fun time.”

Bontemps scored 1,770 points in 83 career games over three years at Beloit College, a school record that held until 2006. In his tenure, Beloit was 72–12, winning three consecutive Midwest Conference championships from 1948 to 1951 and playing in the National Intercollegiate Basketball Tournament as well as the 12-team 1951 National Invitation Tournament. Said Bontemps in 2006, “The conference got upset with us for being too good.”

== NBA/AAU career ==
After college, Bontemps, a 6'3" guard/forward, was the 3rd round (22nd overall) draft pick of the Moline, Illinois based Tri-Cities Blackhawks (today's Atlanta Hawks) of the fledgling National Basketball Association in the 1951 NBA draft.

Instead, as was common in early basketball, Bontemps accepted a job for the Caterpillar Inc. in Peoria, Illinois, and while there he played for the Caterpillar Amateur Athletic Union (AAU) team, the Caterpillar Diesels, (also called the Peoria Cats) and Coach Warren Womble. The Caterpillar Diesels played in the National Industrial Basketball League. Basketball aside, Bontemps had a thirty eight-year career for Caterpillar Inc.

== 1952 USA Olympic Team ==
By virtue of their winning the 1952 AAU championship, the Caterpillar Diesels were then invited to compete in the Olympic basketball team playoffs at Madison Square Garden in New York City. In the Olympic playoffs, Caterpillar defeated the AAU Phillips 66ers in the semifinals, The Caterpillar Diesels then defeated the University of Kansas 62–60 in the tournament final. As a result, Warren Womble was selected as head coach of the 1952 U.S. Olympic basketball team and Coach Phog Allen of the University of Kansas was chosen as assistant coach. Five members of the Caterpillar Diesels (Frank McCabe, Bontemps, Dan Pippin, Marc Freiberger and Howie Williams) made the 14-player roster. Seven University of Kansas players including Naismith Hall of Fame inductee Clyde Lovellette were on the roster. Lovellette would lead Team USA in scoring.

“All of a sudden, I was on the Olympic team,” Bontemps had recalled of his Olympic Team selection. “The reporters started calling, and the crowd started recognizing me. People went nuts, oh, the Olympic Games!”

In the 1952 Olympic Tournament, Bontemps was the 4th leading scorer for 1952 United States men's Olympic basketball team, averaging 7.5 points in the eight Olympic games. On August 2, 1952, Bontemps and Team USA secured a 36–25 Gold Medal Game victory over the Soviet Union.

Following the Olympic victory, Bontemps continued to play for the Caterpillar Diesels while working at Caterpillar, Inc. He was named a 1953 AAU All- American. In 1954, he repeated as an AAU All-American and was named "National Outstanding Amateur Basketball Player" and National Player of the Year by the Los Angeles Times.

== Personal ==
Bontemps and his wife, the former Norma Jean Smith of Beloit, a 1951 Beloit College graduate, lived in Morton, Illinois. Norma Bontemps died in 2009.

Ron Bontemps' son Kevin, played basketball at the University of Illinois from 1980 to 1983, after a career at Morton High School. Kevin Bontemps like his father, was inducted into the IBCA (Illinois Basketball Coaches Assication) Hall of Fame. Of his father he said, “I attribute all (my basketball success) to my dad. He was never one to force me to play, but he was always willing to get out on the driveway or get in the gym with me. And my older brother, Gary, we were always on the driveaway or in a gym having fun, with dad showing us things and encouraging me to work on different aspects of my game.”

At age 90, Ron Bontemps died on May 13, 2017, at Rosewood Care Center in Peoria, Illinois. He was survived by his two sons and two daughters, eight grandchildren and four great-grandchildren.

== Honors ==
- Helms Foundation Hall of Fame (1958)
- Beloit College Hall of Honor (1965)
- Bontemps' jersey is displayed at Beloit College, in the foyer of Flood Arena
- Illinois Basketball Coaches Association Hall of Fame (1973)
- Taylorville High School Sports Hall of Fame
- Greater Peoria Sports Hall of Fame
