= Chet Noe =

American basketball player (1931–2025)

Personal information
- Born: November 3, 1931 Los Angeles, California, U.S.
- Died: February 10, 2025 (aged 93) Issaquah, Washington, U.S.
- Listed height: 6 ft 7 in (2.01 m)
- Listed weight: 200 lb (91 kg)

Career information
- High school: Washington Prep (Los Angeles, California)
- College: Oregon (1950–1953)
- NBA draft: 1953: 2nd round, 12th overall pick
- Drafted by: Boston Celtics
- Playing career: 1953–1958
- Position: Center

Career history
- 1953–1954: Buchan Bakers
- 1954–1955: Houston Ada Oilers
- 1955–1958: Phillips 66ers

Career highlights
- First-team All-PCC (1953)
- Stats at Basketball Reference

Chester William Noe Jr. (November 3, 1931 – February 10, 2025) was an American basketball player. He played college basketball for the Oregon Ducks.

== Early life ==
Noe was born in Los Angeles, California, on November 3, 1931, as the third child of parents Chester Noe Sr. and Zetta McEntire Noe. On April 4, 1934, Noe's father died after he was struck in the head by a night watchman as he tried to remove his repossessed truck from a car yard. The watchman was acquitted of manslaughter. Noe was raised by his mother alongside his three sisters.

Noe was an all-city center while he played at Washington Preparatory High School in Los Angeles.

== Basketball career ==
Noe played college basketball for the Oregon Ducks from 1950 to 1953 and led the Ducks in scoring during his final two seasons. He was a first-team All-PCC selection and named the Ducks' Most Valuable Player in 1953.

Noe was selected as an Amateur Athletic Union (AAU) All-American while playing for the Everybody's Drug Store team of Eugene, Oregon, in 1953. He was chosen by the Boston Celtics as the 12th overall pick in the 1953 NBA draft but he did not sign with the team as he believed the pay was not worth living so far away from home.

Noe played for the Buchan Bakers of the Northwest Basketball League (NWBL), and the Houston Ada Oilers and Phillips 66ers of the National Industrial Basketball League (NIBL).

== Post-playing career ==
After his retirement from playing, Noe worked as a petroleum salesman and tobacconist. He and his wife owned and operated the San Diego-based Bay Oil Company which served as a distributor for Phillips 66.

== Personal life and death ==
Noe married Susannah Steele Noe on August 21, 1955. They had two children. Noe and his family lived in Oklahoma, Louisiana, Connecticut, New Jersey and California. He and his wife retired to Sammamish, Washington, in 1995. Steele Noe died on November 19, 2023, at the age of 90.

Noe died at the Swedish Hospital in Issaquah, Washington, on February 10, 2025, at the age of 93.
