= 1952 United States men's Olympic basketball team =

- Head coach: Warren Womble
- Scoring leader: (United States) Clyde Lovellette (13.9)
- Biggest win: 48 vs. Chile

The 1952 United States men's Olympic basketball team competed in the 1952 Summer Olympics in Helsinki, Finland from July 14 to August 2, 1952. Warren Womble was the team's head coach, and Phog Allen was the team's main assistant coach. The team won its third straight Summer Olympics basketball gold medal.

== Olympic Trials ==
The Olympic Trials were held at the end of March in Kansas City and New York. The collegiate side of the Olympic Trials bracket included the NAIA, NIT, and NCAA champions as well as the NCAA runner-up. The post-collegiate amateur bracket contained the four semi-finalists from the 1952 AAU basketball tournament.

Amateur semi-finals Collegiate semi-finals March 29
New York City
Peoria Caterpillars (AAU champions)	71
Air Force All-Stars (AAU third place)	67
Kansas City
Phillips Oilers (AAU runners-up)	50^{2OT}
Hollywood Fibber McGee and Molly (AAU fourth place)	48
New York City
La Salle (NIT champions)	71
St. John's (NCAA runners-up)	62
Kansas City
Kansas (NCAA champions)	92
Southwest Missouri State (NAIA champions)	65

Amateur final Collegiate final March 31
New York City
Peoria Caterpillars	64
Phillips Oilers	50
New York City
La Salle	65
Kansas	70

Final; April 1
New York City
Peoria Caterpillars	62
Kansas	60
Third Place
New York City
Phillips Oilers	92
La Salle	59

== Roster ==
The team consisted of 14 members. It included five members of the Amateur Athletic Union's Peoria Caterpillars team and two Phillips 66ers. The team also featured seven players from the national champion 1951–52 Kansas Jayhawks men's basketball team, as well as their coach Phog Allen, who served as assistant on the team.

	Position	Height	Weight	Age	Hometown	Team
Ron Bontemps	Guard	6'2"	175	25	Taylorville, Illinois	Peoria Caterpillars (Illinois)
Marc Freiberger	Center	6'11"	215	23	Greenville, Texas	Peoria Caterpillars (Oklahoma)
Wayne Glasgow	Guard/Forward	6'3"	190	26	Dacoma, Oklahoma	Phillips 66ers (Oklahoma)
Charlie Hoag	Guard/Forward	6'2"	185	20	Oak Park, Illinois	Kansas
Bill Hougland	Guard	6'4"	180	22	Beloit, Kansas	Kansas
John Keller	Guard/Forward	6'3"	185	23	Page City, Kansas	Kansas
Dean Kelley	Guard	5'11"	165	20	Morton, Illinois	Kansas
Bob Kenney	Forward	6'2"	185	21	Winfield, Kansas	Kansas
Bob Kurland	Center	7'0"	220	27	Jennings, Missouri	Phillips 66ers (Oklahoma St.)
Bill Lienhard	Forward	6'5"	180	22	Lawrence, Kansas	Kansas
Clyde Lovellette	Forward	6'9"	230	22	Terre Haute, Indiana	Kansas
Frank McCabe	Forward	6'8"	225	25	Grand Rapids, Michigan	Peoria Caterpillars (Marquette)
Dan Pippin	Guard	6'1"	170	25	Waynesville, Missouri	Peoria Caterpillars (Missouri)
Howie Williams	Guard	6'0"	168	24	New Ross, Indiana	Peoria Caterpillars (Purdue)

== 1952 Team USA matches ==
25 July 1952

OR p. 680

United States	66–48	Hungary
Scoring by half: 37–23, 27–25

Tennispalatsi, Helsinki
Referees: Vanderperren (BEL), Wabby (EGY)

25 July 1952

OR p. 682

United States	72–47	Czechoslovakia
Scoring by half: 35–21, 37–26

Tennispalatsi, Helsinki
Referees: Ashri (EGY), Reverberi (ITA)

27 July 1952

OR p. 683

United States	56–44	Uruguay
Scoring by half: 32–27, 24–17

Tennispalatsi, Helsinki
Referees: Siener (FRA), Chuard (SUI)

28 July 1952

OR p. 684

United States	86–58	Soviet Union
Scoring by half: 36–22, 50–36

Tennispalatsi, Helsinki
Referees: Siener (FRA), Wahby (EGY)

29 July 1952

OR p. 684

United States	103–55	Chile
Scoring by half: 47–32, 56–23

Tennispalatsi, Helsinki
Referees: Ashri (EGY), Posvar (TCH)

30 July 1952

OR p. 686

United States	57–53	Brazil
Scoring by half: 24–26, 33–27

Tennispalatsi, Helsinki
Referees: Wahby (EGY), Posvar (TCH)

31 July 1952

OR p. 688

United States	85–76	Argentina
Scoring by half: 43–39, 42–37

Messuhalli, Helsinki
Referees: Ashri (EGY), Siener (FRA)

2 August 1952
16:00

OR p. 688

United States	36–25	Soviet Union
Scoring by half: 17–15, 19–10
Pts: Lovellette 9		Pts: Korkia 8

Messuhalli, Helsinki
Referees: Vanderperren (BEL), Wahby (EGY)

== Final match up versus USSR ==
The final match up game was a very low scoring game, as the USSR successfully utilized a low block and time wasting. After ten minutes, Team USA only led 4–3. After the USSR took a lead in the third quarter, Team USA began to display their offense by shooting well, ultimately winning the game by 11 points. Lovellette scored nine points, while Kurland scored eight points.

== Final standings ==
1. United States (8–0)
2. Soviet Union (6–2)
3. Uruguay (5–3)
4. Argentina (5–3)
5. Chile (4–4)
6. Brazil (4–4)
7. Bulgaria (4–4)
8. France (4–4)
9. Canada (3–3)
10. Cuba (1–4)
11. Czechoslovakia (1–2)
12. Egypt (3–3)
13. Finland (0–3)
14. Hungary (2–4)
15. Mexico (1–2)
16. Philippines (1–2)

== See also ==
- Basketball at the 1952 Summer Olympics
