= Aylesworth =

Aylesworth may refer to:

- Aylesworth (surname)
- Aylesworth, Indiana, an unincorporated community in the United States
- Aylesworth, Oklahoma, a submerged community under Lake Texoma
- Ailsworth, Cambridgeshire, England
