= 1960 United States men's Olympic basketball team =

Olympic basketball team

- Head coach: Pete Newell
- Scoring leader: (United States) Oscar Robertson (17.3)

The 1960 United States men's Olympic basketball team competed in the Games of the XVII Olympiad in Rome, Italy, representing the United States of America.

The USA team, coached by California Golden Bears head coach Pete Newell, dominated the competition, winning its games by an average of 42.4 points per game. The team is considered by many to be the best amateur level basketball team of all time, and was elected to the Naismith Memorial Basketball Hall of Fame as a unit, in 2010.

== Roster ==
United States men's national basketball team – 1960 Summer Olympics roster
Players
Coaches

| Pos. | No. | Name | Age – Date of birth | Height | Club | Ctr. |
|---|---|---|---|---|---|---|
| G | 13 | Jay Arnette | 21 – December 19, 1938 | 1.88 m (6 ft 2 in) | Texas | (United States) |
| C | 4 | Walt Bellamy | 21 – July 24, 1939 | 2.11 m (6 ft 11 in) | Indiana | (United States) |
| F | 5 | Bob Boozer | 23 – April 26, 1937 | 2.03 m (6 ft 8 in) | Peoria Caterpillars | (United States) |
| F | 6 | Terry Dischinger | 19 – November 21, 1940 | 2.01 m (6 ft 7 in) | Purdue | (United States) |
| F | 7 | Burdette Haldorson | 26 – January 12, 1934 | 2.06 m (6 ft 9 in) | Phillips 66ers | (United States) |
| C | 8 | Darrall Imhoff | 21 – October 11, 1938 | 2.08 m (6 ft 10 in) | California | (United States) |
| G | 9 | Allen Kelley | 27 – December 24, 1932 | 1.80 m (5 ft 11 in) | Peoria Caterpillars | (United States) |
| G | 10 | Lester Lane | 28 – March 6, 1932 | 1.78 m (5 ft 10 in) | Wichita Vickers | (United States) |
| F | 11 | Jerry Lucas | 20 – March 30, 1940 | 2.03 m (6 ft 8 in) | Ohio State | (United States) |
| F | 14 | Oscar Robertson | 21 – November 24, 1938 | 1.96 m (6 ft 5 in) | Cincinnati | (United States) |
| G | 12 | Adrian Smith | 23 – October 5, 1936 | 1.85 m (6 ft 1 in) | U.S. Armed Forces | (United States) |
| G | 3 | Jerry West | 22 – May 28, 1938 | 1.91 m (6 ft 3 in) | West Virginia | (United States) |

Head coach

(United States) Pete Newell

Legend

- Club – describes last
  club before the tournament
- Age – describes age
  on August 26, 1960

== Olympic trials ==
Trials for the team were held in March and April 1960, in Denver, at the Denver Coliseum. The trials were conducted in the form of an eight team tournament, including teams from the reigning NCAA National Champions, the Ohio State Buckeyes, a team of NCAA All-Stars featuring stars such as Jerry West and Oscar Robertson, an NAIA All-Star team, and the AAU Champions, the Peoria Caterpillar Cats. The NCAA All-Stars won the competition convincingly, and so Pete Newell was named the team's head coach, with Warren Womble as his assistant.

The trials came at a time when the AAU and NCAA were wrestling for control of USA Basketball, and the make-up of the team represented that uneasy truce, as the team was made up of seven collegiate stars, four AAU players, and one representative of the US Armed Forces (guard Adrian Smith). This compromise meant that many top college players were left off the team, including Ohio State's John Havlicek and Providence guard Lenny Wilkens.

== Olympic tournament ==
The team went 8–0 in the Olympic basketball tournament, held in Rome, averaging 101.9 points per game and holding their opponents to 59.5. Five Americans averaged double-figures in scoring - Oscar Robertson (17.3), Jerry Lucas (16.8), Jerry West (14.1), Terry Dischinger (11.3) and Adrian Smith (10.9). Lucas was the star of the medal round, as he scored 21 points in the gold medal game against Brazil, after having scored 26 points in the previous game against host Italy.

=== Results ===
- USA 88, Italy 54
- USA 125, Japan 66
- USA 107, Hungary 63
- USA 104, Yugoslavia 42
- USA 108, Uruguay 50
- USA 81, USSR 57
- USA 112, Italy 81
- USA 90, Brazil 63

== Legacy ==
The 1960 team is thought to be one of the best amateur sports teams in basketball history. Nine members of the squad went on to play in the NBA and four players from the team – Robertson, Lucas, West and Walt Bellamy – have individually been elected to the Naismith Memorial Basketball Hall of Fame, as have head coach Pete Newell and Dutch Lonborg, who was on Newell's staff as team manager. Other career distinctions by team members include Robertson's League MVP Award in 1963–64. Dischinger's 1963 NBA Rookie of the Year Award (an award also received by Robertson (1961), Bellamy (1962), and Lucas(1964), Adrian Smith's NBA All-Star Game MVP in 1966, and West's NBA Finals MVP in 1969. Eight members were later selected to at least one NBA All-Star Game (Bob Boozer, Darrall Imhoff and Adrian Smith were NBA All-Star Game participants during their careers. In total, there were 43 future All-Star berths amongst the teammates. The team was elected to the U.S. Olympic Hall of Fame in 1984.

In 2010, along with the "Dream Team," the 1960 US Olympic men's basketball team was elected to the Naismith Memorial Basketball Hall of Fame as a unit. The election marks only the seventh and eighth teams so honored.

== See also ==
- 1960 Summer Olympics
- Basketball at the 1960 Summer Olympics
- United States at the 1960 Summer Olympics
- United States men's national basketball team
