= Oakland Bittners =

American basketball team

- Leagues: Amateur Athletic Association 1946-1952; American Basketball League 1946-1948; NIBL 1950-1952
- Founded: 1941
- Folded: 1952
- History: Oakland Bittners; 1946–1949; Oakland Blue 'n Gold Atlas; 1949–1951; Oakland Atlas-Pacific Engineers; 1951-1952
- Team colors: Blue, White
- Ownership: Atlas-Pacific
- Championships: 1 AAU Championship (1949)

The Oakland Bittners were an Amateur Athletic Union (AAU) basketball team, located in Oakland, California. The team was named after sponsor Lou Bittner and became the first club to bring a basketball championship back to Oakland back in the day. The Bittners changed their name to Oakland Blue 'n Gold Atlas in 1949 getting a sponsorship from an engineering company, called Atlas-Pacific. The sponsor was Oakland businessman Ted Harrer.

== History ==
=== First years ===
The Bittners were the brainchild of Lou Bittner, who had opened a tax consulting and insurance company. The team entered the American Basketball League in 1946 where the played for two seasons. In their first season they won 18 out of their 20 games and they finished second to Phillips 66ers. Don Barksdale was the most prominent player of the league and he set the ABL's scoring record. The next season they finished third behind the Phillips 66ers and the Denver Nuggets.

But the Bittners became widely known when they reached the AAU championship final in 1947 but they lost to Phillips 66ers (62-41). Two years later the Bittners would take revenge on the Phillips defeating with in the championship game by 55-51. That team was coached by Lou Bittner and had the likes of the later NBA stars Don Barksdale and Jim Pollard. But after the end of the season, the team got the sponsorship from the Blue 'n Gold Atlas company and lost two of its greatest players, Charles Chuck Hanger and Dave Minor who transferred to Denver Blue 'n Gold Atlas.

In the 1949-1950 season the team with Hal Fischer as a coach reached the AAU Final once again but lost to the Phillips 66ers by 65–42. The next season the Oakland Blue 'n Gold Atlas-Pacific entered the National Industrial Basketball League where they competed for two years.

Ed Voss, who helped the team win the title in 1949, died four years later at age 31. Barksdale represented the Bittners in the Olympic Games as a part of the 1948 United States men's Olympic basketball team.

== Notable players ==
- Don Barksdale
- Jim Pollard
- Ed Voss
- Paul Napolitano
- Dave Minor
- Don Burness
- Ron Livingstone
- Mike O'Neill
- Charles Hanger
- Bill Calhoun
- Ken Leslie
