= Jim Palmer (basketball, born 1933) =

American basketball player (1933–2013)

Personal information
- Born: June 8, 1933 Keokee, Virginia, U.S.
- Died: September 16, 2013 (aged 80) Catskill, New York, U.S.
- Listed height: 6 ft 8 in (2.03 m)
- Listed weight: 224 lb (102 kg)

Career information
- High school: Keokee (Keokee, Virginia)
- College: Dayton (1954–1957)
- NBA draft: 1957: 2nd round, 12th overall pick
- Drafted by: St. Louis Hawks
- Playing career: 1957–1962
- Position: Center
- Number: 24, 19

Career history
- 1957–1958: Peoria Cats
- 1958–1959: Cincinnati Royals
- 1959–1961: New York Knicks
- 1961: San Francisco Saints
- 1961–1962: Pittsburgh Rens
- 1962: Los Angeles Jets

Career highlights
- AAU All-American (1958)
- Stats at NBA.com
- Stats at Basketball Reference

James G. Palmer (June 8, 1933 – September 16, 2013) was an American professional basketball player. Palmer was selected in the 1957 NBA draft (second round, 12th overall) by the St. Louis Hawks.

He played collegiately at the University of Dayton from 1954 to 1957 before embarking on his professional basketball career. His first stop was in the National Industrial Basketball League playing for the Peoria Cats. After one season, Palmer moved on to the National Basketball Association (NBA) in which he played the next three seasons, splitting his career between the Cincinnati Royals and New York Knicks. In his final year of professional ball, Palmer played in the American Basketball League.

Palmer died on September 16, 2013.

== Career statistics ==
Legend
GP	Games played	GS	Games started	MPG	Minutes per game
FG%	Field goal percentage	3P%	3-point field goal percentage	FT%	Free throw percentage
RPG	Rebounds per game	APG	Assists per game	SPG	Steals per game
BPG	Blocks per game	PPG	Points per game	**Bold**	Career high

=== NBA ===
==== Regular season ====
Year	Team	GP	MPG	FG%	FT%	RPG	APG	PPG
1958–59	Cincinnati	**67**	**24.2**	.404	**.724**	**7.0**	**1.0**	**10.3**
1959–60	Cincinnati	20	20.0	**.458**	.709	5.6	.9	9.1
1959–60	New York	54	20.0	.418	.672	5.1	**1.0**	8.0
1960–61	New York	55	12.5	.403	.677	3.3	.5	5.3
Career		196	19.4	.413	.703	5.3	.8	8.1
