= Bill Morris (basketball) =

American basketball player and coach

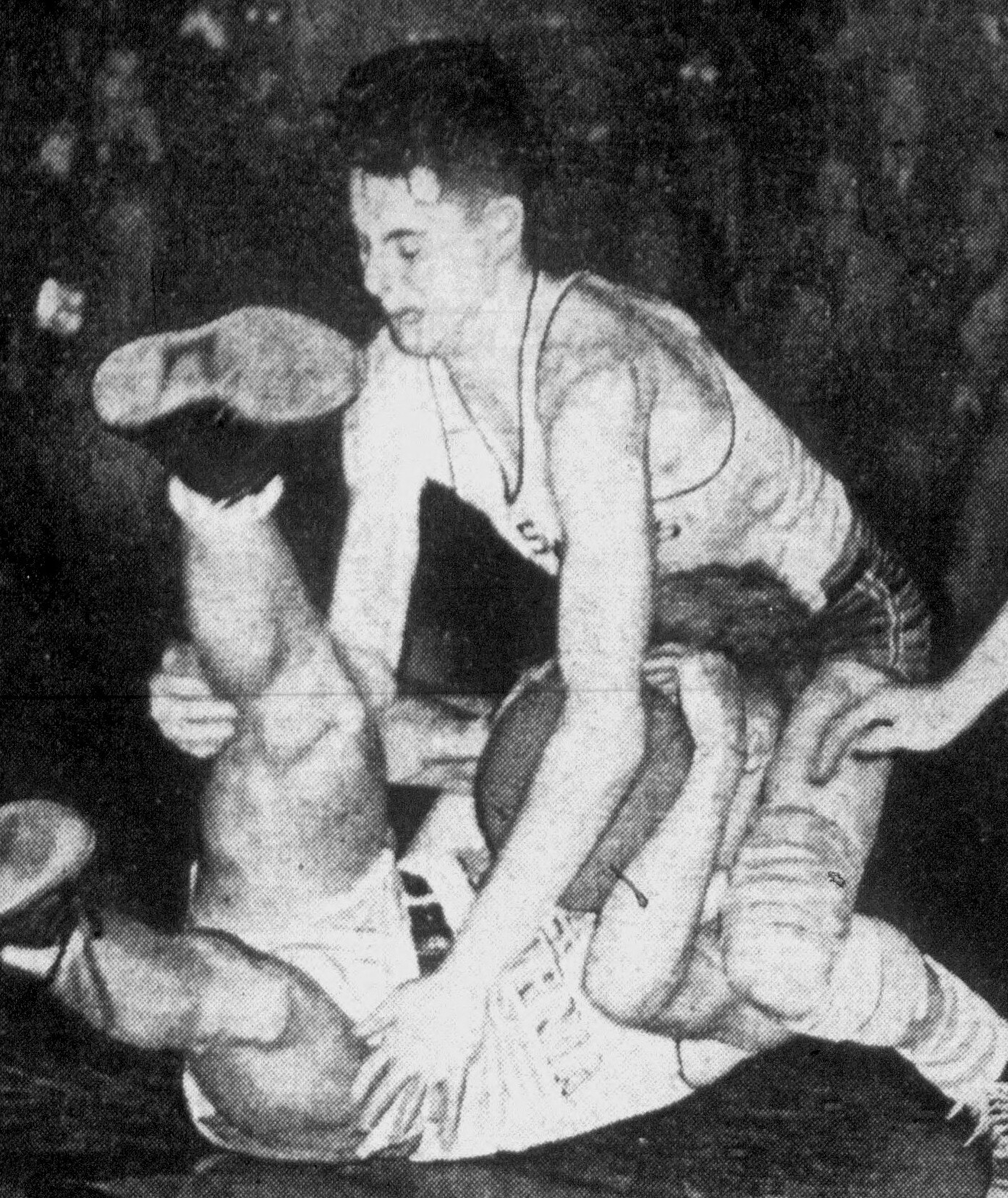
- Morris (top) fights for control of the ball with USC Trojans player Dick Bailey (bottom) on March 15, 1943.

Personal information
- Born: March 14, 1920 Snohomish, Washington
- Died: June 16, 1995 (aged 75) Bartlesville, Oklahoma
- Listed height: 6 ft 0 in (1.83 m)

Career information
- High school: Bremerton (Bremerton, Washington)
- College: Washington (1941–1944)
- Position: Guard

Career history

Coaching
- 1947–1959: Washington (assistant)
- 1953–1954: Buchan Bakers

Career highlights
- First-team All-American – Helms (1943); Third-team All-American – Converse (1944); 2× First-team All-PCC (1943, 1944)

William Charles Morris (March 14, 1920 – June 16, 1995) was an American basketball player known for his collegiate career at the University of Washington in the 1940s.

== Career ==
Morris was a two-time NCAA All-American in 1943 and 1944 as well as a two-time first-team all-Pacific Coast Conference. Known as "Battleship Bill" Morris, he set then-school records of 183 points in a single season and 439 for a career. After serving in World War II he served as an assistant coach at his alma mater. Morris then coached the Buchan Bakers of Seattle to the Amateur Athletic Union national championship.

== Death ==
Morris died of cancer on June 16, 1995, at age 75.
