= Paul Napolitano =

American basketball player (1923–1997)

Personal information
- Born: February 3, 1923 Clayton, California, U.S.
- Died: June 22, 1997 (aged 74) Martinez, California, U.S.
- Listed height: 6 ft 2 in (1.88 m)
- Listed weight: 185 lb (84 kg)

Career information
- High school: McClymonds (Oakland, California)
- College: San Francisco (1942–1943, 1945–1946)
- BAA draft: 1947: 6th round, 54th overall pick
- Drafted by: St. Louis Bombers
- Playing career: 1945–1949
- Position: Small forward / shooting guard

Career history
- 1945–1946: San Francisco Dardis Dandies
- 1946–1947: Oakland Bittners
- 1947–1948: Minneapolis Lakers
- 1948: Indianapolis Jets

Career highlights
- NBL champion (1948); World Professional Basketball Tournament champion (1948); AAU All-American (1947)
- Stats at NBA.com
- Stats at Basketball Reference

Paul Walter Napolitano (February 3, 1923 – June 22, 1997) was an American basketball player. He played college basketball for the University of San Francisco before going on to play professionally. In 1948, he won the National Basketball League championship and the World Professional Basketball Tournament with the Minneapolis Lakers. A good shooter, Napolitano was known for his one-handed jumpshot at a time when two-handed shots where the norm, with coach John Kundla calling it the "California shot".

== High school career ==
Napolitano was a star center for McClymonds High School in Oakland, California and was named the O.A.L. player of the year and to the Oakland All-City Quintet in 1941.

== Playing career ==
Napolitano's college career at the University of San Francisco was interrupted by World War II and in 1943, he joined the United States Coast Guard. He played basketball for the Coast Guard's Sealions alongside Jim Pollard.

After World War II, Pollard played amateur basketball for one season with the Dardi Dandies of the Amateur Athletic Union. The following season, he joined the Oakland Bittners in the same league. He played one season with the Bittners, again alongside Pollard, and was named an AAU All-American that year while helping the team finish as a runner-up to the AAU championship.

Later he was selected in the 1947 BAA Draft by the St. Louis Bombers. The same year, both Napolitano and Pollard joined the Minneapolis Lakers of the National Basketball League. Playing the guard position, he averaged 3.0 points in 52 regular seasons games. In April 1948, he helped the Lakers win the World Professional Basketball Tournament, defeating the New York Renaissance 75–71 in the title game, behind George Mikans 40 points. The same month, he helped the Lakers win the 1948 NBL championship.

He was released by the Lakers prior to the start of the following season. He later signed with the Indianapolis Jets where he appeared in one game before being released in December 1948.

== Later life ==
Following his professional career, Napolitano continued to play amateur basketball. He was a bar manager and owner for several years and later worked as a bartender at Original Joe's in San Francisco.

== Death ==
On June 22, 1997, Napolitano and his wife, Pauline, were killed in a mobile home fire in Pacheco, California. Napolitano died soon after he was taken to an area hospital while his wife was declared dead at the scene. Fire investigators said that it appeared to be an accident and was possibly started by a cigarette or electrical problems.

== Career statistics ==
Legend
GP	Games played
FG%	Field-goal percentage
FT%	Free-throw percentage
APG	Assists per game
PPG	Points per game

=== NBL ===
==== Regular season ====
Year	Team	GP	FG%	FT%	PF	PPG
1947–48	Minneapolis	52	-	.800	0.9	3.0
Career		52	-	.800	0.9	3.0

==== Playoffs ====
Year	Team	GP	FG%	FT%	PF	PPG
1947–48	Minneapolis	9	-	.800	0.0	2.2
Career		9	-	.800	0.0	2.2

=== BAA ===
==== Regular season ====
Year	Team	GP	FG%	FT%	APG	PPG
1948–49	Indianapolis	1	.000	.000	.0	.0
Career		1	.000	.000	.0	.0
