= 1948 United States men's Olympic basketball team =

- Head coach: Bud Browning
- Scoring leader: (United States) Alex Groza (11.1)
- Biggest win: 65 vs. Switzerland

The 1948 United States men's Olympic basketball team competed in the 1948 Summer Olympics, along with 22 other basketball teams. The basketball tournament was held in London, England at Wembley Stadium. Team USA won their second straight gold medal after 1936 (Summer Olympic Games were cancelled in 1940 and 1944, due to World War II). The team was made up of Amateur Athletic Union and college basketball players.

== Olympic Trials ==
The Olympic Trials were held at the end of March. The collegiate side of the Olympic Trials bracket included the NAIA and NCAA champions as well as the NCAA and NIT runners-up. NIT champion Saint Louis were held out of the trials by the school's faculty so NIT runner-up NYU were invited in their place.

== Roster ==
| Name | Position | Height | Weight | Age | Home Town | Team/School |
|---|---|---|---|---|---|---|
| Cliff Barker | Forward | 6'2" | 150 | 27 | Yorktown, Indiana | Kentucky |
| Don Barksdale | Center | 6'6" | 225 | 25 | Berkeley, California | Oakland Bittners (UCLA) |
| Ralph Beard | Guard | 5'10" | 176 | 20 | Louisville, Kentucky | Kentucky |
| Lew Beck | Guard | 6'0" | 165 | 26 | Pendleton, Oregon | Phillips 66ers (Oregon State) |
| Vince Boryla | Guard | 6'3" | 190 | 21 | East Chicago, Indiana | Denver Nuggets (Denver) |
| Gordon Carpenter | Center/Forward | 6'7" | 220 | 21 | Ash Flat, Arkansas | Phillips 66ers (Arkansas) |
| Alex Groza | Center | 6'7" | 220 | 21 | Martins Ferry, Ohio | Kentucky |
| Wallace Jones | Center/Forward | 6'4" | 205 | 22 | Harlan, Kentucky | Kentucky |
| Bob Kurland | Center | 7'0" | 220 | 23 | Jennings, Missouri | Phillips 66ers (Oklahoma State) |
| Ray Lumpp | Guard | 6'0" | 170 | 25 | East Williston, New York | NYU |
| R. C. Pitts | Forward | 6'5" | 200 | 29 | Oxford, Mississippi | Phillips 66ers (Arkansas) |
| Jesse Renick | Guard | 6'2" | 185 | 30 | Marietta, Oklahoma | Phillips 66ers (Oklahoma State) |
| Jackie Robinson | Guard | 6'0" | 180 | 21 | Fort Worth, Texas | Baylor |
| Kenny Rollins | Guard | 6'0" | 170 | 24 | Wickliffe, Kentucky | Kentucky |

== USA match ups (8–0) ==
- United States 86 Switzerland 21
- United States 53 Czechoslovakia 28
- United States 59 Argentina 57
- United States 66 Egypt 28
- United States 61 Peru 33
- United States 63 Uruguay 28
- United States 71 Mexico 40
- United States 65 France 21

== Final standings ==
1. United States (8–0)
2. France (5–2)
3. Brazil (7–1)
4. Mexico (5–2)
5. Uruguay (5–3)
6. Chile (4–4)
7. Czechoslovakia (4–4)
8. Korea (3–5)
9. Canada (6–2)
10. Peru (4–4)
11. Belgium (5–3)
12. Philippines (4–4)
13. Cuba (4–3)
14. Iran (2–5)
15. Argentina (4–4)
16. Hungary (3–5)
17. Italy (4–4)
18. China (5–3)
19. Egypt (2–6)
20. Great Britain (0–7)
21. Switzerland (2–6)
22. Iraq (0–7)
23. Ireland (0–6)

== Team USA ==
Alex Groza led Team USA with an average of 11.1 points per game. Bud Browning was the head coach, Adolph Rupp was the assistant coach, and Louis Wilke was the manager.

== See also ==
- Basketball at the 1948 Summer Olympics
