= Ailsworth =

Village in Cambridgeshire, England

Coordinates: 52.576°N 0.353°W

- Location within Cambridgeshire
- Population: 559 (2011 census)
- OS grid reference: TL124985
  - London: 73 miles (117 km)
- Civil parish: Ailsworth
- Unitary authority: Peterborough
- Ceremonial county: Cambridgeshire
- Region: East
- Country: England
- Sovereign state: United Kingdom
- Post town: Peterborough
- Postcode district: PE5
- Dialling code: 01733
- Police: Cambridgeshire
- Fire: Cambridgeshire
- Ambulance: East of England
- UK Parliament: North West Cambridgeshire
- Website: http://www.ailsworthparishcouncil.org.uk

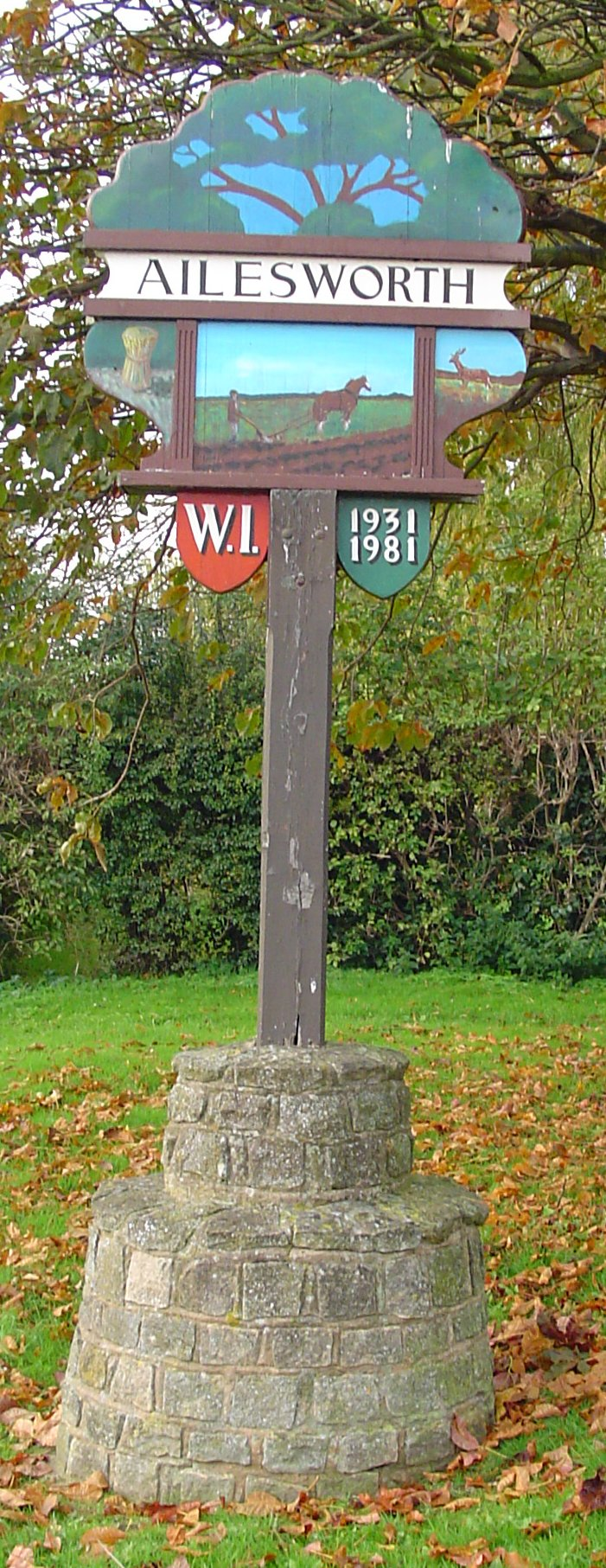
Signpost in Ailsworth

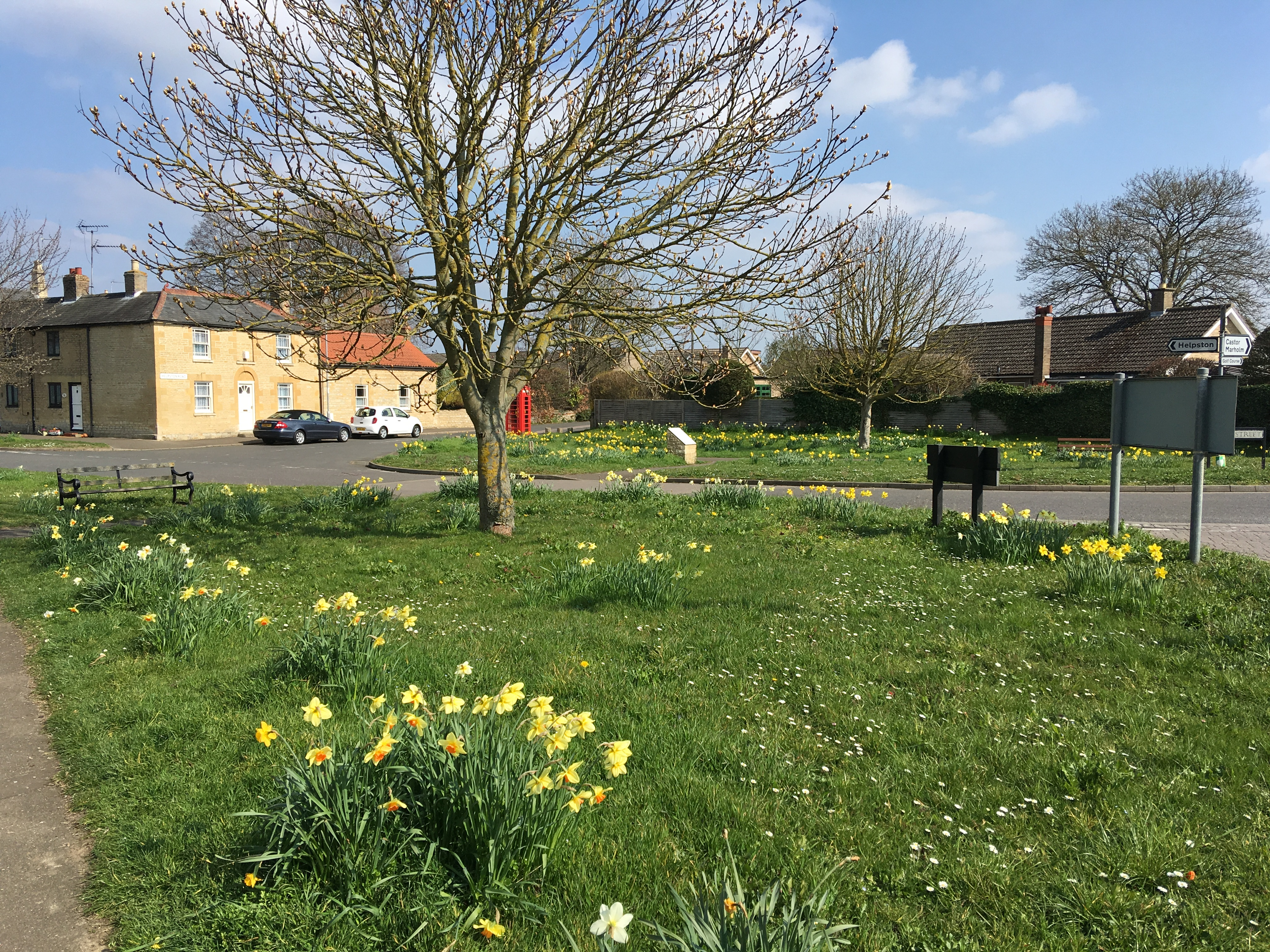

Ailsworth or Ailesworth is a village and civil parish in the City of Peterborough unitary authority, about 4.5 miles (7.2 km) west of the city centre. The parish is part of the former Soke of Peterborough, which was considered geographically part of Northamptonshire until in 1974, following the Local Government Act 1972, it became part of Cambridgeshire.

In the 2001 census the population stood at 413 (188 households) and this has increased to 559 (248 households) in the 2011 census

== History ==
The village's toponym comes from the Old English Ægeleswurth. The Domesday Book of 1086 records it as Eglesworde meaning "an enclosure of a man named Agel".

The common lands of Ailsworth and the neighbouring parish of Castor were not enclosed until 1898.

The old village sign (pictured) celebrating the Golden Jubilee of the local Women's Institute was erected in 1981 on the boundary with the neighbouring village of Castor. A new sign was erected in 2021 and the old sign sold off.

The £9 million dual-carriageway Ailsworth and Castor Bypass, which is part of the A47 road, was opened in September 1991.

== Churches ==
Ailsworth lies in the ecclesiastical parish of Castor.

There is a Methodist Chapel. The Methodist Chapel is closed 2020. The building is for sale at £250.000. Application to open a shop is in planning stage.

== Amenities ==
In Ailsworth there is a medical practice, coffee house, recreation ground and children's play area.

The village does not have a public house with the nearest being The Prince of Wales Feathers and The Royal Oak in neighbouring Castor. The last pub that was open in the village was The Wheatsheaf which is now a private home situated at the end of Peterborough Road.

== See also ==
- Aylesworth (disambiguation)
