= Marc Freiberger =

American basketball player

Personal information
- Born: November 27, 1928 Amarillo, Texas, U.S.
- Died: June 29, 2005 (aged 76) Winston-Salem, North Carolina, U.S.
- Listed height: 6 ft 11 in (2.11 m)
- Listed weight: 215 lb (98 kg)

Career information
- High school: Greenville (Greenville, Texas)
- College: Oklahoma (1948–1951)
- NBA draft: 1951: 1st round, 3rd overall pick
- Drafted by: Indianapolis Olympians
- Position: Center
- Stats at Basketball Reference
Medals
Men's basketball
Representing the United States
Gold medal – first place	1952 Helsinki	Team competition

Marcus Ross Freiberger (November 27, 1928 – June 29, 2005) was an American basketball player from Amarillo, Texas who was a gold medalist in the 1952 Summer Olympics.

== Playing career ==
At 6'11", Freiberger played collegiately for the Oklahoma Sooners.

He was a member of the 1952 United States men's Olympic basketball team that won the gold medal in Helsinki.

From 1951 to 1955 Freiberger played for the Caterpillar Diesels and then the Houston Ada Oilers in the National Industrial Basketball League.

== Death ==
Freiberger died in Winston-Salem, North Carolina on June 29, 2005.
