= Aylesworth (surname) =

Aylesworth is an English surname. Notable people with this surname include the following:

- Allen Bristol Aylesworth (1854–1952), Canadian lawyer and parliamentarian
- Arthur Aylesworth (1883–1946), American actor
- John Aylesworth (1928–2010), Canadian television producer and comedian
- Michael Aylesworth (b. 1943), American politician
- Reiko Aylesworth (b. 1972), American film and television actress
- Wilbert Ross Aylesworth (1892–1973), Canadian politician, farmer and merchant
