= Buchan Bakers =

- Leagues: AAU 1948–1961; NIBL 1958–1961
- Founded: 1948
- Folded: 1961
- Arena: Seattle Civic Autitorium
- Capacity: 2,963
- Team colors: green, red
- Ownership: Buchan Baking
- Championships: 1 AAU Tournament; 1 National Industrial Basketball League

The Buchan Bakers was an amateur basketball team located in Seattle, Washington and competed in the National Industrial Basketball League. The Bakers were one of the most popular teams of the Amateur Athletic Union (AAU), rising to fame in 1957 when they beat the Phillips 66ers in the AAU tournament final. The team was sponsored by the Buchan Baking company, thus they adopted their name. During the 1955-56 season, the Buchan Bakers traveled to Asia, playing teams from Japan, China and they were the first AAU basketball team to play against Eastern European teams during the Cold War.

The Buchan Bakers were active for 13 seasons winning the National AAU Championship, the Northwest AAU title six times, representing the United States in trips to Asia, Europe and behind the Iron Curtain. In addition, the Bakers, with their three years in the National Industrial Basketball League, had been Seattle's first national sports franchise.

== History ==
=== Early years in AAU ===
The Buchan Bakers were founded in 1948, when Warren Bud Howard convinced George Buchan and his Buchan Baking Company to sponsor his basketball team in the Northwest AAU League. The three first seasons until 1951 were not successful and coach Howard decided to recruit higher-quality players with college experience for the 1951-52 season.

The Buchan Bakers that year were led by 6-foot, 8-inch center Rod Gibbs from College of Puget Sound and 5-foot, 7-inch guard Dar Gilchrist from Long Island University. Other members of the team included Jack Ward and Louis Soriano, both from the University of Washington. The Bakers breezed through Northwest League competition and went to the National AAU Tournament in Denver for the first time. Although they lost in the first round, for the Buchan Bakers the season had been a success.

In the 1952-1953 next season, the University of Washington basketball team, led by All-American center Bob Houbregs, made it to the NCAA Final Four, and Howard began recruiting all five Husky starters. Houbregs agreed to play for the Bakers, and both he and his father were given jobs at the bakery. Shortly after Houbregs received his first paycheck, he signed a contract with the Milwaukee Hawks of the NBA. Howard did manage to sign up his supporting cast from the UW Charlie Koon, Joe Cipriano, Mike McCutcheon and Doug McClary, and he enlisted Bill Morris, the UW freshmen coach, to take over coaching. Howard became business manager of the team.

In the 1953-54 season, the Buchan Bakers unveiled their new team of former UW players, along with Chet Noe, a 6-foot, 7-inch center from the University of Oregon. The Bakers won the Northwest League crown, and although once again they traveled to Denver for the National AAU Tournament, once again they were defeated in the first round.

In 1954, Morris returned to the UW, and former high school coach Frank Fidler was hired to coach the Buchan Bakers. Although the Bakers lost center Chet Noe to the Ada Oilers, the team was strengthened by the additions of Hartley Kruger, a 6-foot, 8-inch center from the University of Idaho, and forward Ed Tucker, a former Stanford star, who was taking pre-med classes at the University of Washington. Unfortunately, the two newcomers werent always available to play Kruger had work obligations and Tucker had military obligations—and the team was not able to develop the consistency to win the National AAU Tournament. The Bakers won their opening round game, but fell to the Peoria Caterpillars in the second round, 81-79 in overtime.

=== 1955: The success comes ===
For their championship run in 1955-56, the Buchan Bakers brought in several key players, including Phil Jordon, a 6-foot, 10-inch center, who would play in the NBA for several years, and George Swyers, the NAIAs leading scorer from West Virginia Tech. Dean Parsons, a 6-foot, 8-inch power forward from Washington and Stan Glowaski, a 6-foot, 5-inch guard from Seattle U also joined the Bakers full-time after playing with the team in the AAU tournament the year before But the Bakers season was almost derailed by a new team to the Northwest AAU League which featured Elgin Baylor, a Seattle University recruit sitting out the season to gain eligibility. Baylor's team beat the Bakers twice and the two teams finished the regular season in a tie for first. A wild playoff game to determine the league championship resulted in a victory for the Buchan Bakers.

For the National AAU Tournament, the Bakers added Bruno Boin, a 6-foot, 9-inch sophomore center from the University of Washington. The Bakers defeated Denver Central Insurance and the Pasadena Mirror-Glazers to get into the semifinals against Milwaukee Allen-Bradley. The Allen-Bradley team featured 6-foot, 10-inch Terry Rand, an All-American from Marquette, but it was Bruno Boin who was the difference, sinking Milwaukee with deadly long-range hook shots. That set up the championship game with Phillips 66ers, the defending champion, against the unheralded Buchan Bakers.

Phillips came out strong, building a 10-2 lead, but after the Bakers closed the gap, the game remained close throughout. The game featured rough play and cold shooting, and neither team led by more than three points the rest of the way. With two-and-one-half minutes left, the score was tied 57-57 and Buchan's coach Frank Fidler decided to hold on for the last shot. With 29 seconds left, Fidler called time out and set up a play for George Swyers to take the last shot. The play went exactly as planned until the ball got to Swyers, who found himself tightly guarded by Burdette Haldorson. Swyers had to twist around the 6-foot, 8-inch defender, and throw up an awkward runner as the horn went off. Incredibly, the ball went through the net and the Buchan Bakers were National AAU Champions. Swyers and Charlie Koon were named to the all-tournament team.

=== Worldwide tour ===
During the 1955-56 season, the Buchan Bakers traveled to Asia, playing teams from Japan, China and the Philippines. After the season, the Bakers traveled to Europe and were the first AAU basketball team to play behind the Iron Curtain. The team played in Poland and Czechoslovakia, in addition to France, Spain, and Italy. But the teams hopes of traveling to Australia to play in the Olympic Games were swatted away by Bill Russell. As winners of the National AAU Tournament, the Bakers were invited to a four-team round robin tournament to determine the U.S. Olympic Team. The Bakers lost to the Russell-led College All-Stars and dropped a rematch with Phillips 66ers. Although the Bakers beat the Armed Forces All-Stars, the Bakers were shut out of the Olympic selections.

After winning the national championship, many of the key players chose not to return for the 1956-57 season. Phil Jordon joined the NBA, George Swyers returned home and joined the nearby Akron Goodyear team, Stan Glowaski was called up for military duty, Joe Cipriano started his basketball coaching career, and Bruno Boin returned to the UW. Charlie Koon and Dean Parsons were the key returnees. After seeing how well Elgin Baylor played, Howard recruited Baylor's teammate from the College of Idaho, R. C. Owens. Owens, although only 6-foot, 3-inches tall, was a strong rebounder with incredible leaping ability. The Buchan Bakers won the Northwest AAU League easily, and advanced in the National AAU Tournament to the semifinals before losing to the Air Force All-Stars, the eventual champions. R.C. Owens was named to the all-tournament team, but after the season ended he decided to give professional football a try. He became a wide receiver for the San Francisco 49ers.

The 1957-58 season was the last for the Buchan Bakers in the Northwest AAU League, and once again they finished in first place. The veteran Charlie Koon was joined by his championship season teammate Bruno Boin, who took a year off from playing at the University of Washington. Other standouts on the team included Dick Stricklin, a 6-foot, 7-inch forward from Seattle University, who averaged 13.3 points a game; Larry Beck, a 6-foot, 4-inch forward from Washington State, and Carl Boldt, a 6-foot, 5-inch forward from the University of San Francisco. Boldt had played on the USF team with Bill Russell that had won the NCAA championship in 1956. The Bakers fell to the Phillips 66ers in the quarterfinals of the National AAU tournament, 71-61.

=== 1958-1961: NIBL ===
Finally for the 1958-59 season, when the team was accepted into the National Industrial Basketball League. The league featured the Akron Goodyear Wingfoots, the Phillips 66ers, the Denver D-C Truckers, the Peoria Caterpillars and the Wichita Vickers teams that the Bakers had played regularly in the past several years. The Bakers retained their Pacific Northwest identity with returnees, Charlie Koon and Larry Ramm from Washington, Dick Stricklin from Seattle U, and Larry Beck from Washington State. Carl Boldt from University of San Francisco returned, and Howard recruited two of Boldt's teammates from USF guard Gene Brown and center Art Day. Also from the Bay Area, guard Carroll Williams joined the team from San Jose State. The Bakers went 10-20 during their first year, finishing in last place. They were eliminated from the National AAU Tournament by the Marines All-Stars 63-62.

The rigors of a national schedule proved too much for the two remaining participants in the 1956 National AAU Championship run. Coach Frank Fidler and veteran guard Charlie Koon, citing time away from home and work, left the Buchan Bakers after the 1958-59 season. To replace Fidler, Bud Howard hired Gene Johnson, a long-time AAU coach who had guided the McPherson Globe Oilers to the National AAU Championship in 1936 and then had coached the gold medal-winning U.S. Olympic Team that year. Howard and Johnson began looking outside the West Coast for talent, and what they gained in player ability they lost in local fan support. The Bakers did obtain the services of Bruno Boin, who had graduated from the UW, and Charlie Brown, who had played with Elgin Baylor at Seattle U. for one year and had starred in his own right the following year. But most of the new players were from the South where Johnson had coached before coming to Buchans. The 1959-60 Bakers managed to improve to a 14-18 record, good enough for seventh in the nine-team NIBL. However, the team caught fire in time for the National AAU Tournament, helped by the pick up of Dave Mills, a strong rebounder and scorer from Seattle University. The Bakers lost their semifinal game to Akron Goodyear, but came back to win the next night for a third-place finish.

=== 1961: End of an era ===
The next year, there were no players from local colleges and interest in the team dwindled. The NIBL had shrunk to six teams, and the Bakers finished 10-24, which gave them a third-place finish in the three-team Western Division of the NIBL. The Buchan Bakers played their last game March 23, 1961, losing to the Denver D-C Truckers, 107-81, in the quarterfinals of the National AAU Tournament. The National Industrial Basketball League folded after the season and two of its members, the Cleveland Pipers and the New York Tuck Tapers, moved into the newly formed American Basketball League. George Buchan had also decided not to continue the team in the face of changes in both basketball and the bakery business.
