= Bob Boozer =

American basketball player (1937–2012)

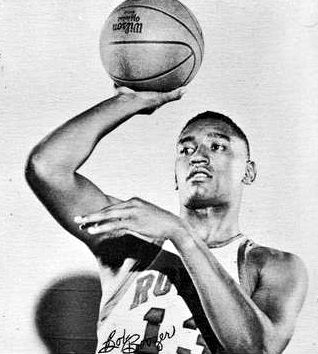

Personal information
- Born: April 26, 1937 Tuscaloosa, Alabama, U.S.
- Died: May 19, 2012 (aged 75) Omaha, Nebraska, U.S.
- Listed height: 6 ft 8 in (2.03 m)
- Listed weight: 215 lb (98 kg)

Career information
- High school: Omaha Technical (Omaha, Nebraska)
- College: Kansas State (1956–1959)
- NBA draft: 1959: 1st round, 1st overall pick
- Drafted by: Cincinnati Royals
- Playing career: 1959–1971
- Position: Power forward
- Number: 13, 14, 15, 19, 20

Career history
- 1959–1960: Peoria Caterpillars
- 1960–1963: Cincinnati Royals
- 1963–1965: New York Knicks
- 1965–1966: Los Angeles Lakers
- 1966–1969: Chicago Bulls
- 1969–1970: Seattle SuperSonics
- 1970–1971: Milwaukee Bucks

Career highlights
- NBA champion (1971); NBA All-Star (1968); AAU champion (1960); AAU MVP (1960); AAU All-American (1960); 2× Consensus first-team All-American (1958, 1959); 2× Big Eight Player of the Year (1958, 1959); No. 30 retired by Kansas State Wildcats

Career NBA statistics
- Points: 12,964 (14.8 ppg)
- Rebounds: 7,119 (8.1 rpg)
- Assists: 1,237 (1.4 apg)
- Stats at NBA.com
- Stats at Basketball Reference
- Collegiate Basketball Hall of Fame
Medals
Men's basketball
Representing United States
Olympic Games
Gold medal – first place	1960 Rome	Team competition
Pan American Games
Gold medal – first place	1959 Chicago	Team competition

Robert Louis Boozer (April 26, 1937 – May 19, 2012) was an American professional basketball player in the National Basketball Association (NBA). Boozer won a gold medal in the 1960 Summer Olympics and won an NBA Championship as a member of the Milwaukee Bucks in 1971. Boozer was a member of the 1960 U.S. Olympic team, which was inducted into the Naismith Basketball Hall of Fame as a unit in 2010.

== Early years ==
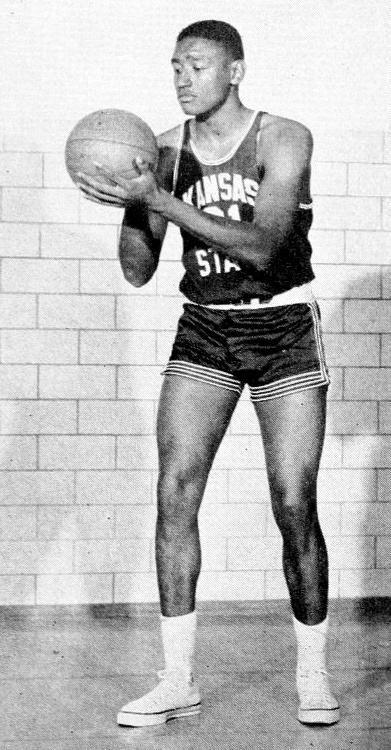
Boozer as a junior at Kansas State

Boozer was born to John and Viola Boozer on April 26, 1937, in Tuscaloosa, Alabama. His family moved to Omaha, Nebraska in the 1940s, after his father's employer (the University of Alabama) had repeatedly denied him pay raises and passed him over for promotion. Boozer remembered taking the trains to move to Omaha. It has also been reported that the family moved from Tuscaloosa to Omaha when Boozer was seven years old, where his father worked in a meat packing plant and his mother as a hotel maid in Omaha. It has also been stated he was born on the same date in North Omaha, Nebraska, where he was raised, though the weight of reporting favors his birth in Tuscaloosa. He graduated from Omaha Technical High School (Tech High) in Omaha. One of his teammates was future Baseball Hall-of-Famer Bob Gibson.

Omaha Tech was the Inter-City League champion in 1955, with Boozer setting a league scoring record. He was 6 ft 6 in (1.98 m) tall when he played high school basketball, and had the ability to score from anywhere on the court.

== College and Olympics ==
He attended Kansas State University, playing forward on the basketball team under future Naismith Memorial Basketball Hall of Fame coach Tex Winter. Boozer received consensus first-team All-America honors in both 1958 and 1959. He is the only Kansas State player to be a consensus All-American twice. In 1959, Boozer was one of the twenty collegians selected to play in the East-West All-Star Game.

As a junior, Boozer helped lead the Wildcats to the NCAA's 1958 Final Four, where they were defeated by the Elgin Baylor led Seattle University, 73–51. Earlier in the tournament, Kansas State and Boozer had defeated future teammate Oscar Robertson's University of Cincinnati team in the NCAA Midwest Regional, 83–80 (Robertson with 30 points and 14 rebounds and Boozer with 24 points and 14 rebounds). Both players unanimously made the Midwest Regional All-Tournament Team.

Kansas State and Boozer lost the Big Seven conference championship in 1957 to fellow sophomore Wilt Chamberlain's University of Kansas team. In the decisive game, Chamberlain had 24 points and 17 rebounds and Boozer had 22 points and nine rebounds. However, Kansas State was Big Eight conference champion in 1958 and 1959, with Boozer named Big Eight Player of the Year in both 1958 and 1959.

In his junior year, Boozer joined Chamberlain on the December 1957 Big Eight Holiday Tournament All-Tournament team. In February 1958, No. 4 ranked Kansas State defeated No. 2 ranked Kansas in double overtime, with Boozer scoring 32 points to Chamberlain's 25; after Kansas earlier had won their matchup in the Holiday Tournament, with Chamberlain scoring 38.

As a sophomore Boozer averaged 19.6 points and 10.3 rebounds per game, and 20.1 points and 10.4 rebounds per game as a junior. Boozer was the Big Eight's second leading scorer in the 1957-58 season, behind only Chamberlain. In his senior year (1958-59), he averaged a Big-Eight conference best 25.6 points per game (sixth nationally), along with 11.3 rebounds per game, second only to Bill Bridges (13.7) in the Big Eight. Boozer is one of only two Kansas State players in school history to average a career double-double (21.9 points and 10.7 rebounds per game over 77 games). His 25.6 points per game was a school record until 2007-08 when broken by Michael Beasley.

A versatile 6 ft 8 in (2.03 m) forward, he was selected by the Cincinnati Royals with the first non-territorial pick of the 1959 NBA draft, but he postponed his NBA career for one year so that he could remain eligible to play in the 1960 Summer Olympics. During that year he played with the Peoria Caterpillars, where he won the National AAU Tournament title and earned Most Valuable Player honors for the tournament.

He won a gold medal with the Olympic team after they won eight games by an average of 42.4 points. The team was inducted into the Basketball Hall of Fame in 2010.

== NBA career ==
=== Cincinnati Royals ===
In the fall of 1960, Boozer joined the Royals with Olympic teammate Oscar Robertson, who would be the NBA's Rookie of the Year that season and is considered one of the NBA's greatest all-time players. As a rookie, Boozer played in all 79 games the Royals played, contributing 8.4 points and 6.2 rebounds per game in a reserve role. The following season, he earned a spot at power forward in the Royals’ starting lineup and averaged 13.7 points and 10.2 rebounds. While the Royals lost to the Detroit Pistons in the playoffs, Boozer averaged 18.3 points and 10.5 rebounds in four games.

Boozer continued to improve, averaging 14.3 points and 11.1 rebounds during the 1962–1963 season. In the Royals 3–2 playoff series win against the Syracuse Nationals, Boozer averaged 17 points and 8.6 rebounds in five games. The Royals lost the ensuing seven game playoff series to the Boston Celtics, where Boozer averaged 10.6 points and 7.6 rebounds per game.

Boozer had averaged 31.5 minutes per game in his second and third years. With the emergence of rookie power forward Jerry Lucas, 1963-64 Rookie of the Year and a future Hall-of-Famer who averaged over 41 minutes per game, Boozer was out of the starting lineup and his playing time fell to less than 23 minutes per game, pushing Boozer out of the Royals' long-term plans. Lucas was one of Boozer's 1960 Olympic teammates.

=== New York Knicks and Los Angeles Lakers ===
In December 1963, Boozer was involved in a three-team set of trades. The New York Knicks traded Donnis Butcher and Bob Duffy and a player to be named later to the Detroit Pistons, for Johnny Egan and Larry Staverman. Boozer was then traded to the Knicks for Staverman and undisclosed amount of cash. Once traded to the Knicks, Boozer averaged 11 more minutes per game, with a 17.5 point and 8.5 rebound per game average with the Knicks during the remainder of the 1963-64 season. Boozer played the 1964-65 season with the Knicks, averaging 14.2 points and 7.6 rebounds per game.

Though Boozer was a productive player with the Knicks, he was traded to the Los Angeles Lakers in 1965 for future Hall of Fame guard Dick Barnett. After one season in Los Angeles, where he played a supporting role amid players like Jerry West and Elgin Baylor, averaging 12.2 points and seven rebounds in nearly 24 minutes per game, Boozer was left open in the 1966 NBA Expansion draft, where he was taken by the Chicago Bulls.

=== Chicago Bulls ===
Boozer flourished in his first year with Chicago, under coach Johnny "Red" Kerr, averaging 18.0 points and 8.5 rebounds. He led the young franchise into the playoffs, along with two All-Star guards, future Hall of Fame player Guy Rodgers and Hall of Fame coach Jerry Sloan. The team was only 33–48, but that was good enough to qualify for the 1967 playoffs. Although swept by the St. Louis Hawks in the playoffs (3–0), Boozer averaged team highs in points (19.7) and rebounds (11.7) per game.

The following year, he averaged 21.5 points and 9.8 rebounds and became the third Bull to appear in the NBA All-Star Game (after Rodgers and Sloan). Although the Bulls had a 29–53 record they again made the playoffs, losing in five games to the Lakers, Boozer averaging 18.8 points and 8.8 rebounds per game. During the 1968–1969 season, Boozer averaged a career-high 21.7 points per game, but the Bulls failed to make the playoffs. In September of 1969, Boozer was traded along with Barry Clemens to the Seattle SuperSonics for Bob Kauffman. In three years with the Bulls, Boozer averaged 20.4 points and 8.7 rebounds per game, his best all around performance on any of his teams.

=== Seattle SuperSonics and Milwaukee Bucks ===
In 1969-70, Boozer started at power forward for Seattle, playing in all 82 games, and averaging 15.2 points and 8.7 rebounds per game. After a season with the SuperSonics, Boozer was traded in September 1970 to the Bucks with Lucius Allen for Zaid Abdul-Aziz (Don Smith). Boozer played a key role as a reserve as the Bucks won their first NBA Championship, in Boozer's final NBA season (1970-71). Boozer averaged 22.2 minutes, 9.1 points and 5.4 rebounds per game. He was the 6th leading scorer and 5th leading rebounder on a team that included his Olympic and Cincinnati teammate Oscar Robertson, and future Hall of Fame center Kareem Abdul-Jabbar.

== Honors ==
Boozer was inducted to the inaugural Kansas State Athletics Hall of Fame class of 1990, and his Kansas State No. 30 jersey was retired in 2005. He received the most votes of any player for Kansas State's team of the century. Boozer was inducted into the National Collegiate Basketball Hall of Fame in 2016. He was also selected to the Nebraska High School Sports Hall of Fame.

== NBA career statistics ==
Legend
GP	Games played	GS	Games started	MPG	Minutes per game
FG%	Field goal percentage	3P%	3-point field goal percentage	FT%	Free throw percentage
RPG	Rebounds per game	APG	Assists per game	SPG	Steals per game
BPG	Blocks per game	PPG	Points per game	**Bold**	Career high
†	Won an NBA championship

=== Regular season ===
Year	Team	GP	MPG	FG%	FT%	RPG	APG	PPG
1960–61	Cincinnati	79	19.9	.415	.672	6.2	1.4	8.4
1961–62	Cincinnati	79	31.5	.438	.707	10.2	1.6	13.7
1962–63	Cincinnati	79	31.5	.444	.714	**11.1**	1.3	14.3
1963–64	Cincinnati	32	22.7	.416	.622	5.6	1.0	11.0
1963–64	New York	49	33.7	.432	.770	7.6	1.3	17.5
1964–65	New York	80	26.7	.440	.779	7.6	1.4	14.2
1965–66	L.A. Lakers	78	23.7	.484	.779	7.0	1.1	12.2
1966–67	Chicago	80	30.6	.487	.781	8.5	1.1	18.0
1967–68	Chicago	77	**38.8**	**.492**	.768	9.8	1.6	21.5
1968–69	Chicago	79	36.4	.481	.806	7.8	**2.0**	**21.7**
1969–70	Seattle	**82**	31.1	.491	**.822**	8.7	1.3	15.2
1970–71†	Milwaukee	80	22.2	.450	.818	5.4	1.6	9.1
Career		874	29.2	.462	.761	8.1	1.4	14.8

=== Playoffs ===
Year	Team	GP	MPG	FG%	FT%	RPG	APG	PPG
1962	Cincinnati	4	35.8	.561	.750	10.5	0.8	18.3
1963	Cincinnati	12	31.8	.413	.714	8.0	1.5	13.3
1966	L.A. Lakers	10	18.1	.400	.750	5.0	0.7	6.7
1967	Chicago	3	35.0	**.632**	**.786**	**11.7**	0.3	**19.7**
1968	Chicago	5	**38.0**	.452	.737	8.8	**2.4**	18.8
1971	Milwaukee†	**14**	20.2	.482	.759	5.3	1.2	7.4
Career		48	26.7	.467	.739	7.1	1.2	11.6

He ended his career with 12,964 total points and 7,119 total rebounds.

== Post-basketball life ==
Boozer returned to Omaha after his career ended, and worked as an executive for Bell Systems (Northwestern Bell) for 27 years; including ten years as a federal lobbyist. He was later appointed to the Nebraska Parole Board and volunteered at Boys Town, the home for troubled youth.

Bob Boozer Drive is a street named in his honor in his native Omaha. The street picks up from where 156th Street ends at West Center Road and goes north to Pacific Street.

== Death ==
Boozer died due to a brain aneurysm in Omaha, Nebraska on May 19, 2012. He was 75. He had been married to his wife Ella for 46 years at the time of his death. After Boozer's death, Oscar Robertson said "'We grew up together. ... We were almost like brothers.'"
