= Howie Crittenden =

American basketball player (1933–2013)

Personal information
- Born: March 13, 1933 Mayfield, Kentucky, U.S.
- Died: August 30, 2013 (aged 80) Murray, Kentucky, U.S.
- Listed height: 6 ft 0 in (1.83 m)

Career information
- High school: Cuba (Cuba, Kentucky)
- College: Murray State (1952–1956)
- NBA draft: 1956: 10th round, 73rd overall pick
- Drafted by: New York Knicks
- Position: Guard
- Number: 19

Career history

Playing
- 1956–1960: Peoria Caterpillars

Coaching
- 1958–1959: Metropolis HS
- 1960–1965: Calloway County HS
- 1965–1966: Missouri (assistant)

Career highlights
- 3× AAU All-American (1957, 1958, 1960); 2× AAU champion (1958, 1960); 2× First-team All-OVC (1954, 1955); No. 19 retired by Murray State Racers
- Stats at Basketball Reference

Howard Royce Crittenden (March 3, 1933 – August 30, 2013) was an American basketball player, best known for his college career at Murray State University and in the Amateur Athletic Union (AAU).

== High school and college career ==
Crittenden first gained fame as a high school player for the Cuba High School Cubs who, despite an enrollment of only around 100 students, captured the 1952 Kentucky state championship, defeating the much larger Louisville Manual High. Crittenden was named all-state his last two years and a high school All-American in his senior season.

He then moved to Murray State, where over his four-year career Crittenden scored 2,019 points (19.4 per game), graduating as the Racers' all-time leading scorer (since eclipsed). Crittenden was the first player in school history to eclipse the 2,000 point mark – and the only one to do so without the benefit of the three-point shot. Crittenden also holds the school record for free throws made with 731, a mark that still ranks among the best in NCAA history. Crittenden was inducted into the Murray State athletic Hall of Fame in 1970 and the Kentucky basketball Hall of Fame in 1972.

== AAU career and later life ==
After graduating in 1956, Crittenden was drafted by the New York Knicks in the tenth round of the 1956 NBA draft. However, in a move not uncommon in the early days of American professional basketball, he instead signed with Caterpillar Inc. to play for their AAU team the Peoria Caterpillars. Crittenden thrived in industrial basketball, being named an AAU All-American in three of his four seasons with the club. Crittenden led the Cats to two AAU titles in 1958 and 1960.

After his playing days were over, Crittenden became a coach and administrator. He was head basketball coach at Metropolis High School in Metropolis, Illinois, and Calloway County High School in Murray, Kentucky. He later entered administration at Calloway County High School and Henderson County High School in Henderson, Kentucky. Crittenden was also an assistant coach at the University of Missouri during the 1965–66 season.

Crittenden died on August 30, 2013, at his home in Murray, Kentucky.
