= Howie Williams (basketball) =

American basketball player (1927–2004)

Personal information
- Born: October 29, 1927 New Ross, Indiana, U.S.
- Died: December 25, 2004 (aged 77) Phoenix, Arizona, U.S.
- Listed height: 6 ft 0 in (1.83 m)
- Listed weight: 185 lb (84 kg)

Career information
- High school: New Ross (New Ross, Indiana)
- College: Purdue (1946–1950)
- NBA draft: 1950: 3rd round, 30th overall pick
- Drafted by: Minneapolis Lakers
- Playing career: 1950–1954
- Position: Guard

Career history
- 1950–1954: Peoria Caterpillars

Career highlights
- 2× First-team All-Big Ten (1949, 1950)
- Stats at Basketball Reference
Medals
Men's basketball
Representing the United States
Olympic Games
Gold medal – first place	1952 Helsinki	Team competition

Howard Earl "Howie" Williams (October 29, 1927 – December 25, 2004) was an American basketball player who competed in the 1952 Summer Olympics. Williams played collegiately at Purdue University where he was a 2x All-Big Ten guard (1948–49, 1949–50); he was selected as the Purdue team MVP in his junior and senior seasons and as Team Captain in 1949–50; posting a career total of 735 points (10.0 game avg). He led the Big Ten Conference in Free Throw Percentage (85.7%) for the 1948–49 season.

He was a 3rd Round pick of the Minneapolis Lakers in the 1950 NBA draft but chose instead to sign a contract with the Peoria Caterpillars of the American Athletic Union and the National Industrial Basketball League. The Caterpillars finished 4th in the NIBL but won the National AAU title (the first of three consecutive titles), knocking off the regular season champions, the Phillips Oilers in the semi-finals on Williams last second bucket. Williams and the rest of the Caterpillar team defeated the NCAA Champion Kansas Jayhawks in the AAU Title game. Following the title game, the Los Angeles Times named Williams the AAU Player of the Year; Williams then led Peoria to another AAU National title in 1953.

The 1952 win placed Williams as well as Peoria teammates; Ronald Bontemps, Marcus Freiberger, Frank McCabe and Dan Pippin on the U.S. Olympic squad. That team, led by fellow native Hoosier Clyde Lovellette won the gold medal. He played all eight games and finished #8 in scoring for the squad.

Williams spent four seasons playing for the Caterpillars and finished with 1,235 career points, eighth on their career scoring list.

He was inducted into the Indiana Basketball Hall of Fame in 1989 and the Greater Peoria Sports Hall of Fame in 1991. He died in Phoenix, Arizona in 2004; following a 35-year career with the Caterpillar Corporation.
