= Houston Ada Oilers =

Ada Oilers
- Nickname: The Oilers
- Leagues: Amateur Athletic Union 1952–55; NIBL 1952–55
- Founded: 1952
- Folded: 1957
- Arena: Jeppesen Gymnasium (2.500)
- Team colors: Gold, White

The Houston Ada Oilers was an amateur basketball club located in Houston, Texas, sponsored and run by the Phillips Petroleum Company. The team was created after the huge success the company's other team, the Phillips 66ers, had achieved in the 1940s and early 1950s.

== History ==
=== The first Oilers ===
In 1920, in Bartlesville, Oklahoma the Phillips 66ers (nicknamed as the Oilers) was founded by the company's employees. Boots Adams, future president of the company, helped organize the 66ers and played on the team as well. Featuring players like Bob Kurland, the game’s first 7-foot center, Phillips became a dominant force in its league winning 11 national titles (with 10 second-place finishes) and 11 first-place finishes in the NIBL (including 10 straight between 1948 and 1958).

Thirty years later, Boots' son, Bud, owner of the Ada company (he later purchased the Tennessee Titans of the National Football League), introduced the idea of similarly forming a basketball team from the company, based in Houston.

Thanks to his support, the team was founded in 1952 with Ada Oil company sponsorship. They instantly became as part of the National Industrial Basketball League, an amateur league that seriously challenged the NBA for players and headlines during its heyday in the 1940s and 1950s. The Oilers never really challenged their sisterly club, the Phillips 66ers for league supremacy, going 24–34 in NIBL games in their three years here (1952 through 1955).

=== A new generation ===
Featuring players such as Johnny Stanich, a UCLA All-American who was successful despite a childhood accident that cost him three fingers on his left hand, Parks, a defense-minded swingman who played with Kurland at Oklahoma A&M, Nick Revon, a guard from New Orleans, Marc Freiberger, a 6'11" center from Oklahoma, and Elton Cotton, a 6'6" forward from the University of Houston.

=== AAU success ===
The Ada Oilers had their best showing in the 1956 AAU tournament after Bud Adams sold the squad to Vickers Petroleum in Wichita. The Oilers finished third that year, losing a tense game to the 66ers in the semifinals (71–69).

The Oilers, who traveled in Adams-designed outfits that featured cowboy boots and hats, along with full-length fur overcoats, provided a colorful footnote to the city’s sports history. Johnny Stanich, who rejected an offer from the New York Knicks to play in the NIBL, began his career with the Phillips 66ers and spent two years playing in Denver before ending his career with Ada, retiring as an executive in the company.

Players were expected to put in a full day in the office or out in the field before practicing or playing in their "off" hours. though the team would travel first-class by Bud Adams’ private plane. After three years in the NBL the team was disbanded. In 1960 Bud Adams bought the Houston Oilers, an American football club.

=== Notable players ===
- Johnny Stanich
- Marc Freiberger
