= Warren Womble =

American basketball coach (1920–2015)

Personal information
- Born: March 15, 1920 Aylesworth, Oklahoma, U.S.
- Died: March 21, 2015 (aged 95) Springdale, Arkansas, U.S.

Career information
- College: SE Oklahoma State (1947–1948)
- Position: Guard

Career history

Coaching
- 1951–1960: Peoria Cats

Career highlights
- As head coach: 5× AAU champion (1952–1954, 1958, 1960); National Industrial League champion (1954)
Medals
Men's basketball
Representing United States
Olympic Games
Gold medal – first place	1952 Helsinki
FIBA World Cup
Gold medal – first place	1954 Brazil

John Warren Womble, Jr. (March 15, 1920 – March 21, 2015) was an American basketball coach. He was the head coach of the Peoria Cats, a National Industrial Basketball League (NIBL) team, located in Peoria, Illinois, and the head coach of the 1952 United States men's Olympic basketball team.

== Early life ==
Born in Aylesworth, Oklahoma, Womble attended college at Southeastern Oklahoma State University, where he was a two-sport Savage Storm athlete, earning letters in tennis and basketball. He was a guard on the school's basketball team that reached the quarterfinals of the AAU National Tournament in Denver, Colorado, in 1948.

== Coaching career ==
=== Club coaching career ===
At the club level, Womble was the head coach of the Peoria Cats for 10 seasons (1951–60). With the Cats, he won 296 games and lost 126, while leading his teams to the National Amateur Athletic Union Tournament championship five times. He coached the Cats team that tied with the Bartlesville Phillips 66ers, for the most wins in the National Industrial Basketball League (14–10 overall record), in 1954. Womble would later go on to serve as the first director of the National Industrial Basketball League.

=== National team coaching career ===
In international competition, Womble had an unbelievable 34–0 record against some of the best international competition in the world. In 1952, Womble's Cats won the Olympic Trials Tournament. He was then named head coach of the 1952 United States men's Olympic basketball team. Team USA (a team which included seven of his Cats players) went on to defeat the Soviet Union in the final of the 1952 Helsinki Summer Olympics, by a score of 36–25, to win the gold medal.

Womble also coached the USA national team that won the gold medal at the 1954 FIBA World Championship. Later, he coached the first United States team to tour the Soviet Union, in 1958. In 1960, his Cats placed second in the Olympic Trials Tournament. Womble was named as assistant coach of the U.S. team at the 1960 Rome Summer Olympics. That team included Hall of Fame members Jerry West, Oscar Robertson, Walt Bellamy, and Jerry Lucas. They defeated Brazil, by a score of 90–36, to win the gold medal.

== Honors ==
- Womble was named to the Helms Foundation Hall of Fame.
- Womble was named to the Oklahoma Athletic Hall of Fame, in 1977.
- Womble was inducted into the Southeastern Athletic Hall of Fame, on February 18, 1978.

== Personal life ==
Womble served in the United States Army. He worked in management with Caterpillar Corporation, until he retired in 1985. Womble died on March 21, 2015, at the age of 95, in Springdale, Arkansas.

== See also ==
- FIBA Basketball World Cup winning head coaches
