= Don Barksdale =

American basketball player (1923–1993)

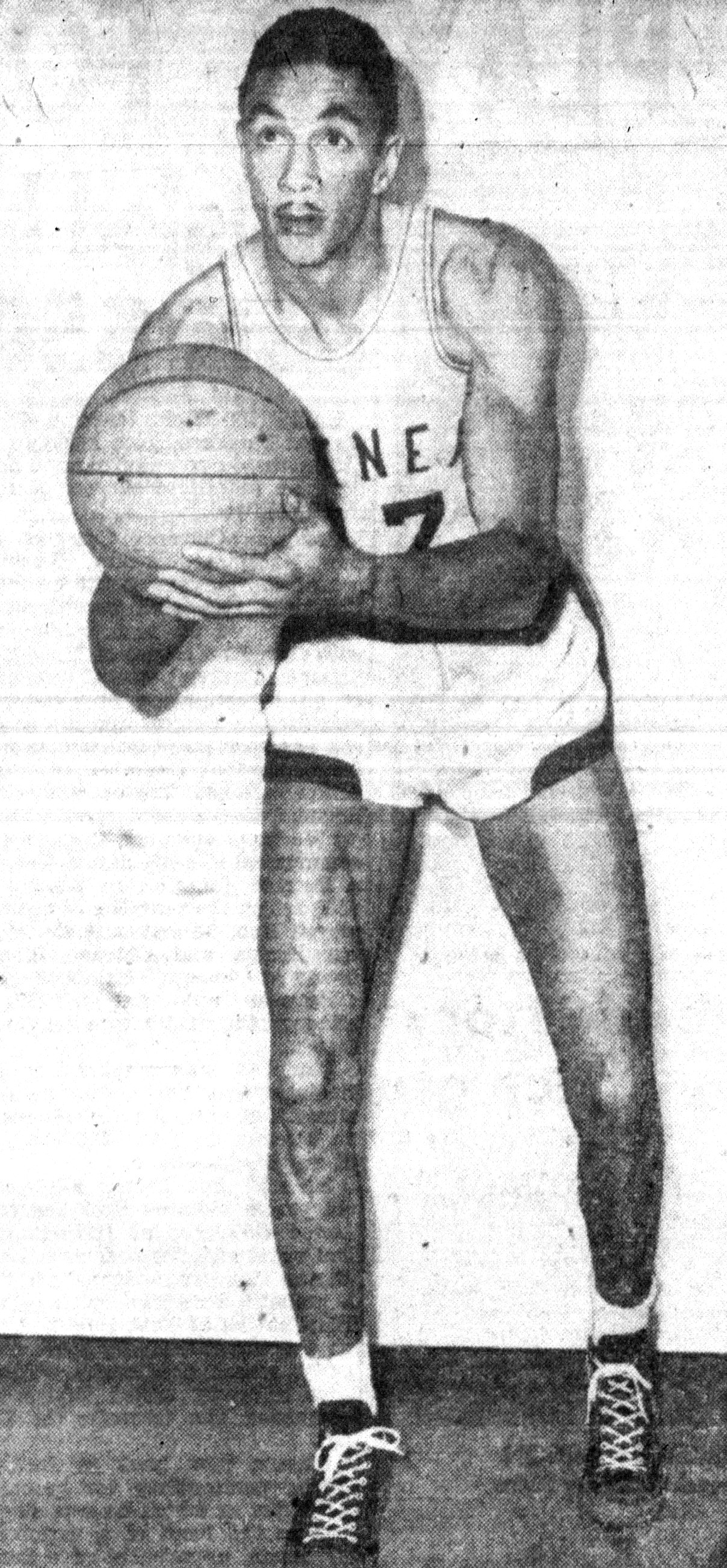
- Barksdale, circa 1948

Personal information
- Born: March 31, 1923 Oakland, California, U.S.
- Died: March 8, 1993 (aged 69) Oakland, California, U.S.
- Listed height: 6 ft 6 in (1.98 m)
- Listed weight: 200 lb (91 kg)

Career information
- High school: Berkeley (Berkeley, California)
- College: Marin (1941–1943); UCLA (1943, 1946–1947)
- BAA draft: 1947: undrafted
- Playing career: 1948–1955
- Position: Power forward / small forward
- Number: 6, 17

Career history
- 1948–1949: Oakland Bittners
- 1950–1951: Oakland Blue n' Gold Atlas
- 1951–1953: Baltimore Bullets
- 1953–1955: Boston Celtics

Career highlights
- NBA All-Star (1953); Consensus second-team All-American (1947); First-team All-PCC (1947); No. 11 retired by UCLA Bruins

Career NBA statistics
- Points: 2,895 (11.0 ppg)
- Rebounds: 2,088 (8.0 rpg)
- Assists: 549 (2.1 apg)
- Stats at NBA.com
- Stats at Basketball Reference
- Basketball Hall of Fame
Medals
Men's basketball
Representing United States
Olympic Games
Gold medal – first place	1948 London	Team competition
Pan American Games
Gold medal – first place	1951 Buenos Aires	Team competition

Donald Argee Barksdale (March 31, 1923 – March 8, 1993) was an American professional basketball player. He was a pioneer as an African-American basketball player, becoming the first to be named NCAA All-American, the first to play on a United States men's Olympic basketball team, and the first to play in a National Basketball Association (NBA) All-Star Game. He was inducted into the Naismith Memorial Basketball Hall of Fame.

== Early life ==
Born in Oakland, California, to Argee Barksdale, a Pullman porter, and Desoree (née Rowe) Barksdale, Don attended nearby Berkeley High School, where the basketball coach cut him from the team for three straight years because he wanted no more than one black player.

== College ==
Barksdale honed his basketball playing skills in parks, and then played at Marin Junior College from 1941 to 1943 before earning a scholarship to the University of California, Los Angeles. He and fellow junior college transfer Bill Putnam joined the Bruins midseason in 1942–43, following the team's loss of Johnny Fryer, an Army reserve who was called to serve in World War II. Playing in just the final five conference games of the year, the 6-foot-6-inch (1.98 m) Barksdale was named by sports writers as the top center of Pacific Coast Conference Southern Division. He joined the Army in March 1943, and returned from the war for the 1946–47 season. He became the first African American to be named consensus All-American. Barksdale was a member of Alpha Phi Alpha fraternity.

Barksdale owned one of only two black-owned record stores in Los Angeles during his time in UCLA. This had him interacting closely with performers like Etta James, Lou Rawls, and Nat King Cole.

Barksdale was also an accomplished triple jumper and high jumper, winning the 1944 USA Outdoor Track and Field Championships title in the triple jump.

== Olympics ==
In 1948, Barksdale was the first African-American on the U.S. Olympic basketball team. He joined the team at the 1948 Summer Olympics, and became the first African-American to win an Olympic gold medal in basketball.

Barksdale, who had been playing with the Amateur Athletic Union's Oakland Bittners, was given an at-large berth from the independent bracket, but not without heavy lobbying by Fred Maggiora, a member of the Olympic Basketball Committee and a politician in Oakland, which was adjacent to Barksdale's hometown. About eight years later, Maggiora told Barksdale that some committee members' responses to the idea of having a black Olympian was "Hell no, that will never happen." But Maggiora wouldn't let the committee bypass Barksdale.

"This guy fought, fought and fought", Barksdale said, "and I think finally the coach of the Phillips 66ers Omar Browning said, 'That son of a bitch is the best basketball player in the country outside of Bob Kurland, so I don't know how we can turn him down.' So they picked me, but Maggiora said he went through holy hell for it – closed-door meetings and begging."

The 1948 Olympic team had five Kentucky Wildcats basketball players who had just won that school's first national championship in the 1948 NCAA Division I men's basketball tournament. The rest of the Olympic team, consisting of AAU Champion Phillips 66ers and Kentucky team members, later scrimmaged on Stoll Field, then the home of the Kentucky football team, in front of 14,000 spectators, the largest crowd to watch basketball in Kentucky at that time. Barksdale became the first African-American to play against Kentucky in Lexington. He could not stay at the hotel with the rest of the team, but instead stayed with a black host family.

Adolph Rupp, the legendary Kentucky coach, was assistant coach on the 1948 team under Omar Browning.

"[Rupp] turned out to be my closest friend," Barksdale said. "We went to London and won all 12 games and got the gold medal." But he had to brush off indignities just about every step of the way. . . Later, coach Rupp told Barksdale, "Son, I wish things weren't like that, but there's nothing you or I can do about it." Barksdale agreed. He lived by a very simple philosophy. He wasn't interested in protest; he was interested in playing basketball. He had faced prejudice before, and he knew that he would face it again.

== Professional career ==
After college, Barksdale played for the Oakland AAU team until the NBA began to integrate. While playing professional basketball, he started a career in radio broadcasting. In 1948, he became the first black radio disc jockey in the San Francisco Bay Area. He also worked in television and owned a beer distributorship. He became the first African-American beer distributor and the first African-American television host in the Bay area with a show called Sepia Review on KRON-TV.

=== NBA ===
In 1951, Barksdale signed a lucrative contract with the Baltimore Bullets and entered the NBA as a 28-year-old rookie. He would be one of the first African-Americans to play in the NBA after Nathaniel Clifton, Chuck Cooper, Earl Lloyd, and Hank DeZonie had joined the league in 1950. While with the Bullets, he became the first African-American to appear in an NBA All-Star Game in 1953. Shortly afterward, he was traded to the Boston Celtics. Two years later, his playing career was cut short by ankle injuries.

=== Later years ===
After his basketball career ended, Barksdale returned to radio, started his own recording label, and opened two nightclubs in Oakland.

In 1983, Barksdale launched the Save High School Sports Foundation, which is credited with helping to save Oakland school athletic programs from collapse.

== Death ==
Barksdale succumbed to throat cancer at the age of 69 on March 8, 1993, in Oakland, California. He was survived by his sons Donald and Derek.

== Legacy ==
A documentary on Barksdale's life, Bounce: The Don Barksdale Story, was released in 2007. The documentary was produced by Doug Harris for Athletes United for Peace, a Berkeley-based youth sports and media organization.

For his significant contributions to broadcasting in the San Francisco Bay Area, Barksdale was inducted into the Bay Area Radio Hall of Fame in 2007. His sister, Pam Barksdale-Gore, accepted the posthumous honor on his behalf.

On February 24, 2012, Barksdale was announced as a member of the 2012 induction class of the Naismith Memorial Basketball Hall of Fame. He was directly elected by the Hall's Early African-American Pioneers committee, and formally entered the Hall as a contributor on September 7.

The character D'Angelo Barksdale from the HBO series The Wire was named in tribute to Barksdale.

== NBA career statistics ==
Legend
GP	Games played	GS	Games started	MPG	Minutes per game
FG%	Field goal percentage	3P%	3-point field goal percentage	FT%	Free throw percentage
RPG	Rebounds per game	APG	Assists per game	SPG	Steals per game
BPG	Blocks per game	PPG	Points per game	**Bold**	Career high

=== Regular season ===
Year	Team	GP	MPG	FG%	FT%	RPG	APG	PPG
1951–52	Baltimore	62	32.5	.338	**.691**	**9.7**	2.2	12.6
1952–53	Baltimore	65	**35.4**	**.387**	.641	9.2	**2.6**	**13.8**
1953–54	Boston	63	21.6	.376	.662	5.5	1.9	7.3
1954–55	Boston	**72**	24.9	.382	.651	7.6	1.8	10.5
Career		262	28.5	.370	.660	8.0	2.1	11.0
All-Star		1	11.0	.000	.333	3.0	2.0	1.0

=== Playoffs ===
Year	Team	GP	MPG	FG%	FT%	RPG	APG	PPG
1954	Boston	6	**17.7**	.306	.727	4.5	1.2	5.0
1955	Boston	**7**	17.4	**.450**	**.857**	**5.0**	**1.4**	**7.7**
Career		13	17.5	.382	.813	4.8	1.3	6.5

== See also ==
- List of African American firsts
- Bay Area Sports Hall of Fame

== Bibliography ==
- New York Times Obituaries – Don Barksdale, 69, One of First Blacks To Play in N.B.A. New York Times, March 11, 1993. (Don Barksdale obituary)
- Athletes United For Peace
- Crowe, Jerry – Some overdue recognition for a basketball trailblazer. Los Angeles Times, January 29, 2007
- Conner, Floyd – Basketball's Most Wanted: The Top 10 Book of Hoops' Outrageous Deunkers, Incredible Buzzer-Beaters and other oddities. Brasseys's 2002, ISBN 1-57488-361-5
- Rice, Russell – Adolph Rupp: Kentucky's Basketball Baron. Sports Publishing LLC, 1994, ISBN 0-915611-98-8
- Thomas, Ron – They Cleared the Lane: The NBA's Black Pioneers. University of Nebraska Press, 2004 ISBN 0-8032-9454-9
