= Ed Voss =

American basketball player (1922–1953)

Personal information
- Born: 1922
- Died: March 21, 1953 (aged 31) Oakland, California, U.S.
- Listed height: 6 ft 5.5 in (1.97 m)

Career information
- High school: University (Oakland, California)
- College: Stanford (1940–1943)
- Position: Center
- Number: 5

Career highlights
- NCAA champion (1942)

Ed Voss (1922 – March 21, 1953) was an American basketball player.

== College basketball career ==
A 6 ft 5.5 in (197 cm) center from University High School in Oakland, California, Voss played collegiately for Stanford University. As the team's starting center, he helped Stanford to the 1942 NCAA Championship, in which he played all 40 minutes and scored 13 points.

== After college ==
Following his college career, Voss played for the Oakland Bittners of the Amateur Athletic Union, and was a member of the Bittners' 1949 AAU championship team. Married with three children, he died of polio at the age of 31, a month after his 7-year-old son also succumbed to the disease. He is a member of the Stanford Athletic Hall of Fame.
