= Caterpillar Diesels =

Defunct American basketball team

Peoria Cats
- Nickname: The Caterpillars
- Leagues: Amateur Athletic Union 1937–1960; NIBL 1947–1960
- Founded: 1937
- Folded: 1960
- History: Caterpillar Diesels 1937–1946; Peoria Cats 1952–1960
- Arena: Peoria Armory, later Robertson Field House
- Team colors: White, Yellow, DarkBlue &
- Ownership: Caterpillar
- Championships: 5 AAU Tournament; 1 National Industrial Basketball League; 1 Olympic Trial Playoffs

The Caterpillar Diesels (also later known as the Peoria Cats or Caterpillars) was an amateur basketball team located in Peoria, Illinois and sponsored and run by the Caterpillar Inc. company. The Caterpillars were one of the most successful teams of the Amateur Athletic Union (AAU) in the 1950s and they became world-wide known in 1952 when five of their players represented the USA team in the Olympics, winning the gold medal.

== History ==
=== Team creation ===
The origins of the team go back to the beginning of the 20th century when a few Caterpillar employees formed the company's first team, the Holt-Caterpillar, in 1915. Gradually, basketball became part of the employee activities program and the team would create its basketball section in 1937. The team's would change soon to Caterpillar Diesels.

The Caterpillar team won five AAU national championships from 1952 to 1960 and was the first team in the Cold War era (1958) to tour the USSR where they went undefeated.

=== 1945–1949: Entry in the AAU and NIBL ===
The Caterpillar's team, funded by nickels and dimes it collected from vending machines inside company break rooms, just began to scratch the surface of its potential in the annual national AAU tournaments from 1945 to 1951 (all hosted at Denver). The Cat Diesels were placed among the top four twice: a third in 1949 and a fourth in 1951. They also joined the newly formed amateur league the National Industrial Basketball League in 1947, finishing second behind the Milwaukee Harnischfegers in their first season. Peoria would turn a corner without knowing it at the end of the 1947–1948 season with the acquisition of an obscure 29-year-old guard from Southeastern State College in Oklahoma named Warren Womble.

=== 1949–1952: Warren Womble builds a winning squad ===
After playing the 1948–49 season, Womble expressed a desire to Caterpillar executives to move back to Oklahoma to pursue a coaching career. That was when the Cats manager Jim Monroe made easily the best move in Peoria's AAU program, offering Womble the coaching job, replacing the Cats' first coach, Marv Hamilton. Womble assisted Hamilton, who was promoted to a position within the company that didn't allow him to coach anymore, for the 1949–50 campaign before taking over as head coach the following year. Womble focused on reforming the team, acquiring sharp-shooting guard Howie Williams from Purdue, 6-foot-9-inch Frank McCabe (Marquette), 6-foot-11-inch center [Will Reeser]6-foot-2-inch guard from Kansas State Teachers College (now Emporia State University) a Little All American two years running. Marcus Freiberger from Oklahoma, speedy 5-foot-10-inch guard Dan Pippin from Missouri and 6-foot-2-inch guard Ron Bontemps who played for Illinois' first undefeated high school state champion, Taylorville, in 1944.

The Cats ushered in a basketball renaissance in Peoria with a 66–53 victory over great rivals Phillips 66ers in the 1952 AAU national championship game. Williams drained nine of 11 shots for a game-high 20 points and Dan Pippin added 17 in what proved to be the first of three consecutive national titles for Peoria.

In general, the early 1950s was a period when the NBA was still developing. Star college players like Allen Kelley, drafted by the Milwaukee Bucks in 1954, and Howie Crittenden, selected by the New York Knicks in 1956, both chose to play for the Cats instead.

=== 1952–1960: The team becomes known nationwide ===
By winning the AAU championship in 1952, the Diesels went on to compete in the Olympic basketball team playoffs at Madison Square Garden in New York City, N.Y. At the Olympic playoffs, after beating the Phillips 66ers in the semifinals, the Caterpillar Diesels defeated the University of Kansas with the score of 62–60. As a result, Warren Womble was selected to be the head coach of the U.S. Olympic basketball team and could choose seven members to comprise the U.S. Olympic team. He chose five members of the Caterpillar Diesels (Frank McCabe, Ron Bontemps, Dan Pippin, Marc Freiberger and Howie Williams) and also chose two members of the Phillips 66ers (Bob Kurland and Wayne Glasgow) out of respect to their rival team and the NIBL. Phog Allen, the legendary basketball coach who is often referred to as the “Father of Basketball Coaching,” was the head coach of the University of Kansas and was chosen as assistant coach of the U.S. Olympic team and would report to Womble.

In the Olympics of 1952 in Helsinki, the USA team was the only undefeated team after the first six games. The U.S. played Argentina in the first game of the final round, winning 85–76. The U.S. was matched in the finals against the Russian team. This was a monumental occasion as it was at the height of the Cold War and was also the first Olympics that Russia fielded a basketball team. The U.S. defeated the Russians 36–25 in a not televised final, winning the gold medal.
After the Olympic triumph the Diesels changed their name to Peoria Cats and continued their success in the AAU Tournaments. The Cats went on to defeat Los Alamitos Naval Air Station (73–62) and Grihalva Buick (63–55), both of California, for titles in 1953 and 1954, respectively.

With the addition of 6-foot-9-inch Bert Born, a member of the Kansas Jayhawks' 1952 NCAA national champion and MVP of the 1953 Final Four for a national runner-up, Peoria added another AAU national title in 1958 with a 74–71 four-overtime classic over the Denver-Chicago Truckers. When the NBA's No. 1 overall choice of the 1959 draft, Bob Boozer, an All-American from Kansas State, spurned Cincinnati Royals's pro franchise to play in Peoria, the Cats tacked on their last championship. Peoria defeated the Akron Wingfoots 115–99 in the 1960 final.

=== 1960: Curtain falls ===
Caterpillar decided to end its sponsorship of the Cats in 1960. Escalating salaries offered by NBA franchises – gaining in popularity because of the infusion of college talent such as West, Baylor, Chamberlain and Russell – caused Caterpillar to think twice about continuing its program. Bob Boozer finally signed for the Cincinnati Royals and enjoyed an 11-year NBA stint.

Caterpillar was more interested in developing employees, not becoming a minor-league affiliate for the NBA. Although the company liked the positive exposure it received from sponsoring a championship basketball team, it decided to pull the plug.

== Notable players ==
- Bob Boozer
- Howie Williams
- Frank McCabe
- Marcus Freiberger
- Warren Womble
- Allen Kelley
- Howie Crittenden

== Trophies ==
- AAU National Tournament: 5 (1952, 1953, 1954, 1958, 1960)
- National Industrial Basketball League: 1 (1953–1954)
- Olympic Trial Playoffs: 1 (1952)
