= Allen Kelley =

American basketball player

Personal information
- Born: December 24, 1932 Dearing, Kansas, U.S.
- Died: August 13, 2016 (aged 83) Lawrence, Kansas, U.S.
- Listed height: 5 ft 11 in (1.80 m)
- Listed weight: 164 lb (74 kg)

Career information
- High school: McCune (McCune, Kansas)
- College: Kansas (1951–1954)
- NBA draft: 1954: 7th round, 56th overall pick
- Drafted by: Milwaukee Hawks
- Position: Guard

Career history
- 1953–1960: Peoria Cats

Career highlights
- NCAA champion (1952); 2× First-team All-Big Seven (1953, 1954); 3x AAU champion (1954, 1958, 1960)
- Stats at Basketball Reference
Medals
Men's basketball
Representing United States
Olympic Games
Gold medal – first place	1960 Rome	Team competition
FIBA World Cup
Gold medal – first place	1954 Rio de Janeiro

Earl Allen Kelley (December 24, 1932 – August 13, 2016) was an American basketball player who competed in the 1960 Summer Olympics.

Born in Dearing, Kansas, he was part of the American basketball team, which won the gold medal in 1960. Kelley died at the age of 83 on August 13, 2016, in Lawrence, Kansas.

He was the brother of 1952 Summer Olympics gold medalist Dean Kelley.
