= Bud Browning =

American basketball coach (1911–1978)

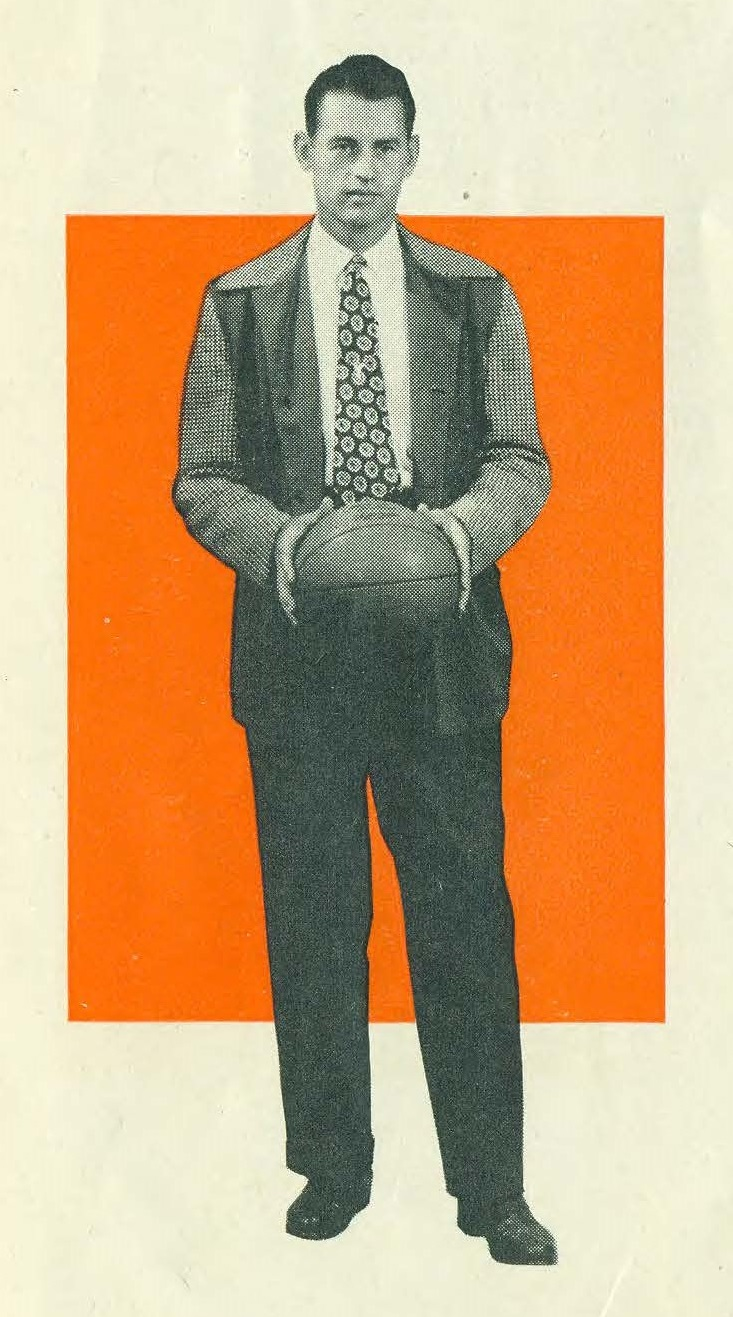
- Browning with the Phillips 66ers

Personal information
- Born: October 5, 1911 Lawton, Oklahoma, US
- Died: September 11, 1978 (aged 66) Fort Collins, Colorado, US

Career information
- High school: Enid (Enid, Oklahoma)
- College: Oklahoma (1932–1935)
- Playing career: 1935–1943
- Position: Guard / forward

Career history

Playing
- 1935: South Kansas Stage Lines
- 1936: Santa Fe Trailways
- 1937–1943: Phillips 66ers

Coaching
- 1943–1948, 1953–1954, 1958–1964: Phillips 66ers

Career highlights
- As player: 2× AAU champion (1940, 1943); 2× AAU All-American (1935, 1936); Consensus All-American (1935); 3× First-team All-Big Six (1933–1935); As coach: 7× AAU champion (1944–1948, 1962, 1963)
Medals
Head coach for United States
Men's basketball
Olympic Games
Gold medal – first place	1948 London	Team competition

Omar M. "Bud" Browning (October 5, 1911 – September 11, 1978) was an American basketball coach. In 1948, he became the United States' second Summer Olympics men's basketball head coach. Browning led 1948 USA team to a final record of 8–0, en route to a gold medal at the 1948 Summer Olympics basketball tournament, in London. Browning became the winningest coach in Amateur Athletic Union (AAU) tournament history, when his teams won AAU championships in 1962 and 1963.

He performed as a player in the AAU from 1935 to 1943, but achieved his greatest fame as a coach for the Phillips 66ers, leading them to five consecutive AAU national titles from 1944 to 1948, and to two more titles in 1962 and 1963. Browning first achieved name recognition in the AAU in 1935, when he helped lead the Southern Kansas Stage Lines win the national championship over the McPherson Oil Refiners, 45–26. He was selected for the AAU All-American (all-star) team. The following year, playing for the Santa Fe Trailways team of Kansas City, he again was named All-American helping to take Santa Fe to third place over the Hutchinson Western Transits, 35–33.

The following year, Browning was recruited by the Phillips 66ers, who after a lapse of several years, reconstituted a new team to compete in the 1937 AAU championship. Browning joined such players as Joe Fortenberry, Jack Ragland, Chuck Hyatt, and Tom Pickell. The next two years the team took second in the national tournament, losing to the Denver Safeway Stores both times in the title game. Finally, in 1940, Browning played on his second national championship team, as the Phillips 66ers took their first AAU title, beating their nemesis the Denver team, now known as the Nuggets, in the title game, 39–36. In 1941, he played on the Phillips 66ers third place team, and in 1942 on the second place team.

In 1943, Browning helped the Phillips 66ers win their second national AAU title. The following year, he was named player-coach for the 66ers, and went on to an even more famous career as a coach. After winning five consecutive titles as first player-coach and then coach of the Phillips 66ers, in 1948 he became the United States's second Olympic men's basketball coach. Browning led the team to a final record of 8–0 en route to a gold medal in the 1948 Olympics in London, England.

Browning retired from coaching after 1948, but came back and coached the Phillips 66ers for one year in 1954. The team was not a factor in the AAU tournament. Browning returned to coaching the Phillips 66ers in 1959. Browning also coached the Phillips 66ers in the National Alliance of Basketball Leagues, and led them to two more AAU championships, in 1962 and 1963.

In 1957 Browning was named to the Helms Amateur Basketball Hall of Fame.
