= Aylesworth, Oklahoma =

- Unincorporated community
- Location within Oklahoma Location within the United States
- Coordinates: 34°01′41″N 96°37′36″W
- Country: United States
- State: Oklahoma
- County: Marshall
- Elevation: 673 ft (205 m)
- Time zone: UTC-6 (Central (CST))
  - Summer (DST): UTC-5 (CDT)
- ZIP Code: 73446 (Madill)
- Area code: 580
- GNIS feature ID: 1102951

Aylesworth was an unincorporated community in Marshall County, Oklahoma, United States. It is located 6 miles (9.7 km) east of Kingston. A post office operated in Aylesworth from June 6, 1903, to October 15, 1943. The community was named after a Dawes Commission official named Allison Aylesworth. All of the Aylesworth community is now underneath Lake Texoma.
