= Dan Pippin =

American basketball player (1926–1965)

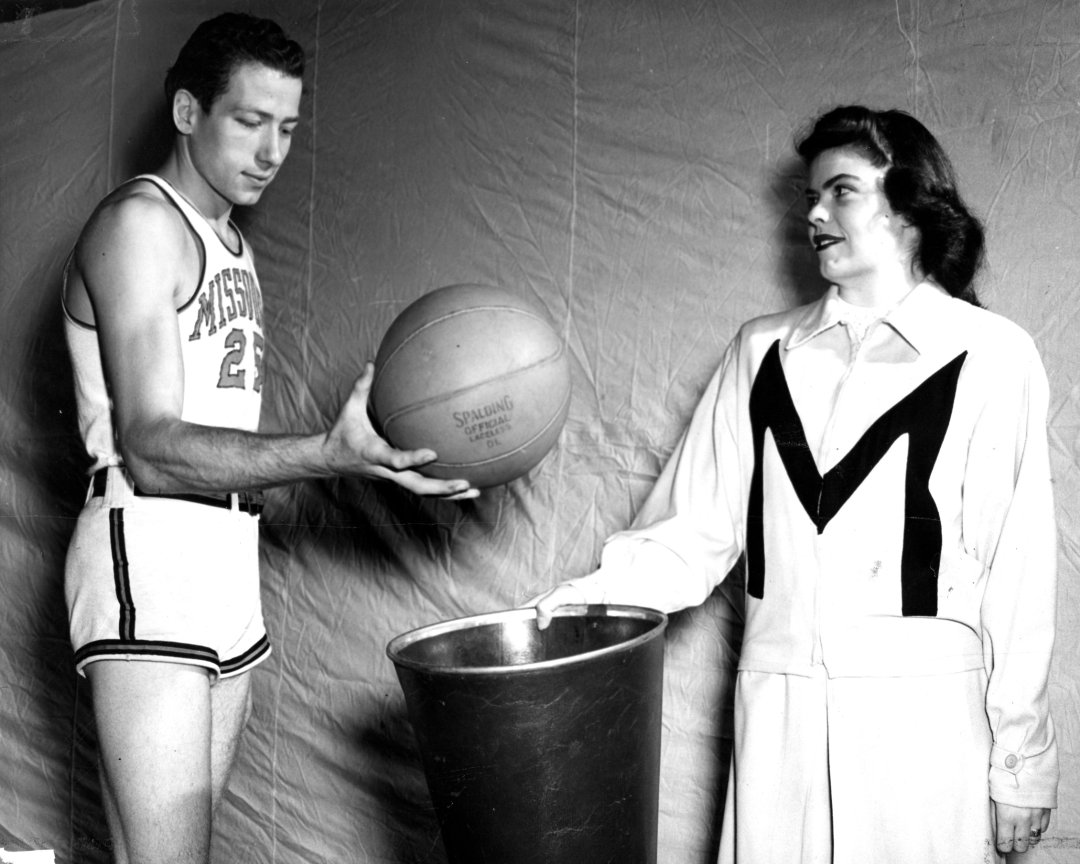
- Pippin (left) at the University of Missouri in 1949 with sister Nancy

Personal information
- Born: October 20, 1926 St. Louis, Missouri, U.S.
- Died: April 1, 1965 (aged 38) Mexico, Missouri, U.S.
- Listed height: 6 ft 1 in (1.85 m)
- Listed weight: 170 lb (77 kg)

Career information
- High school: Waynesville (Waynesville, Missouri)
- College: Missouri (1943–1948)
- Position: Guard / forward

Career highlights
- 2× First-team All-Big Six (1944, 1947); 2× AAU All-American (1952–1953)
Medals
Men's basketball
Representing the United States
Olympic Games
Gold medal – first place	1952 Helsinki	Team competition

Dan Luther Pippin (October 20, 1926 – April 1, 1965) was an American basketball player who played for the University of Missouri. He later captained the American basketball team at the 1952 Summer Olympics that won the gold medal in Helsinki. He played in all eight games.

After Pippin graduated from the University of Missouri he went to work for the Caterpillar Tractor Company in Peoria, Illinois, and played for the National Industrial Basketball League team it sponsored, the Peoria Cats. Pippin later moved to New Mexico where he engaged in the insurance business before returning to his native Missouri. He committed suicide in 1965.
