= Basketball at the 1972 Summer Olympics – Men's team rosters =

Olympic basketball rosters

The following is the list of squads for each of the 16 teams that competed in the men's basketball tournament at the 1972 Summer Olympics.

== Group A ==
=== Australia ===
The following players represented Australia:

- Anatoli Koltuniewicz
- Brian Kerle
- Eddie Palubinskas
- Glenn Marsland
- Ian Watson
- Ken James
- Perry Crosswhite
- Peter Byrne
- Ray Tomlinson
- Richard Duke
- Tom Bender
- Bill Wyatt

=== Brazil ===
The following players represented Brazil:

- Marquinhos
- Adilson
- Mosquito
- Hélio Rubens Garcia
- Zé Geraldo
- José Aparecido
- Dodi
- Luiz Menon
- Radvilas Gorauskas
- Fransergio
- Bira

=== Cuba ===
The following players represented Cuba:

- Juan Domecq
- Ruperto Herrera
- Juan Roca
- Pedro Chappé
- José Miguel Álvarez
- Rafael Cañizares
- Conrado Pérez
- Miguel Calderón
- Tomás Herrera
- Oscar Varona
- Alejandro Urgellés
- Franklin Standard

=== Czechoslovakia ===
The following players represented Czechoslovakia:

- Jan Blažek
- Jan Bobrovský
- Jiří Balaštík
- Jiří Konopásek
- Jiří Pospíšil
- Jiří Růžička
- Jiří Zedníček
- Jiří Zídek
- Kamil Brabenec
- Petr Novický
- Zdeněk Douša
- Zdeněk Kos

=== Egypt ===
The following players represented Egypt:

- Sherif Fouad Aboulkheir
- Ahmed Abdel Hamid El-Saharty
- Awad Abdel Nabi
- Sayed Tewfik El-Sayed
- Adel Ibrahim Ismail
- Fahti Mohamed Kamel
- Mohamed Essam Khaled
- Kamal Kamel Mohammed
- Talaat Guenidi
- Ismail Selim Mohamed
- El-Sayed Abdel Hamid Mobarak

=== Japan ===
The following players represented Japan:

- Atsushi Somatomo
- Hirofumi Numata
- Katsuhiko Sugita
- Kazufumi Sakai
- Kenji Soda
- Kunihiko Yokoyama
- Masatomo Taniguchi
- Mineo Yoshikawa
- Nobuo Chigusa
- Nobuo Hattori
- Satoshi Mori
- Shigeaki Abe

=== Spain ===
The following players represented Spain:

- Carmelo Cabrera
- Cliff Luyk
- Enrique Margall
- Francisco Buscató
- Gonzalo Sagi-Vela
- Jesús Iradier
- Juan Antonio Corbalán
- Luis Santillana
- Miguel Estrada
- Rafael Rullán
- Vicente Ramos
- Wayne Brabender

=== United States ===
The following players represented the United States:

- Kenny Davis
- Doug Collins
- Tom Henderson
- Mike Bantom
- Bobby Jones
- Dwight Jones
- Jim Forbes
- Jim Brewer
- Tommy Burleson
- Tom McMillen
- Kevin Joyce
- Ed Ratleff

== Group B ==
=== Italy ===
The following players represented Italy:

- Dino Meneghin
- Giorgio Giomo
- Giulio Iellini
- Giuseppe Brumatti
- Ivan Bisson
- Luigi Serafini
- Marino Zanatta
- Massimo Masini
- Mauro Cerioni
- Ottorino Flaborea
- Pierluigi Marzorati
- Renzo Bariviera

=== Philippines ===
The following players represented the Philippines:

- Jun Papa
- Danny Florencio
- Ed Ocampo
- Freddie Webb
- Jimmy Mariano
- Manny Paner
- Marte Samson
- Ciso Bernardo
- Ricardo Cleofas
- Rogelio Melencio
- Rosalio Martirez
- William Adornado

=== Poland ===
The following players represented Poland:

- Andrzej Kasprzak
- Andrzej Seweryn
- Eugeniusz Durejko
- Franciszek Niemiec
- Grzegorz Korcz
- Jan Dolczewski
- Janusz Cegliński
- Mieczysław Łopatka
- Piotr Langosz
- Ryszard Białowąs
- Waldemar Kozak
- Andrzej Pasiorowski

=== Puerto Rico ===
The following players represented Puerto Rico:

- Earl Brown
- Billy Baum
- Héctor Blondet
- Jimmy Thordsen
- Joe Hatton
- Mariano Ortiz
- Neftalí Rivera
- Raymond Dalmau
- Ricky Calzada
- Rubén Rodríguez
- Teo Cruz
- Mickey Coll

=== Senegal ===
The following players represented Senegal:

- Abdourahmane N'Diaye
- Alioune Badara Guèye
- Assane Thiam
- Babacar Seck
- Boubacar Traoré
- Cheikh Amadou Fall
- Joseph Diandy
- Doudas Leydi Camara
- Moustafa Diop
- Papa Malick Diop
- Pierre Martin Sagna
- Sylvestre Lopis

=== Soviet Union ===
The following players represented the Soviet Union:

- Anatoli Polivoda
- Sergei Belov
- Zurab Sakandelidze
- Gennadi Volnov
- Sergei Kovalenko
- Modestas Paulauskas
- Alzhan Zharmukhamedov
- Aleksandr Boloshev
- Ivan Edeshko
- Mikheil Korkia
- Ivan Dvorny
- Alexander Belov

=== West Germany ===
The following players represented West Germany:

- Dieter Kuprella
- Dietrich Keller
- Hans-Jörg Krüger
- Helmut Uhlig
- Holger Geschwindner
- Joachim Linnemann
- Jochen Pollex
- Jürgen Wohlers
- Karl Ampt
- Klaus Weinand
- Norbert Thimm
- Rainer Pethran

=== Yugoslavia ===
The following players represented Yugoslavia:

- Blagoja Georgievski
- Damir Šolman
- Dragan Kapičić
- Dragutin Čermak
- Krešimir Ćosić
- Ljubodrag Simonović
- Milun Marović
- Miroljub Damjanović
- Nikola Plećaš
- Ratomir Tvrdić
- Vinko Jelovac
- Žarko Knežević
