= Cuba at the 1972 Summer Olympics =

- IOC code: CUB
- NOC: Cuban Olympic Committee

in Munich
- Competitors: 137 (109 men and 28 women) in 14 sports
- Flag bearer: Teófilo Stevenson
- Medals Ranked 14th: Gold 3 Silver 1 Bronze 4 Total 8

Summer Olympics appearances (overview)
- 1900; 1904; 1908–1920; 1924; 1928; 1932–1936; 1948; 1952; 1956; 1960; 1964; 1968; 1972; 1976; 1980; 1984–1988; 1992; 1996; 2000; 2004; 2008; 2012; 2016; 2020; 2024

Cuba competed at the 1972 Summer Olympics in Munich, West Germany. 137 competitors, 109 men and 28 women, took part in 69 events in 14 sports.

== Medalists ==
Medal	Name	Sport	Event
Gold	Orlando Martinez	Boxing	Men's bantamweight
Gold	Emilio Correa	Boxing	Men's welterweight
Gold	Teófilo Stevenson	Boxing	Men's heavyweight
Silver	Gilberto Carrillo	Boxing	Men's light-heavyweight
Bronze	Silvia Chivás	Athletics	Women's 100 metres
Bronze	Silvia Chivás, Marlene Elejarde, Fulgencia Romay, and Carmen Valdés	Athletics	Women's 4×100 metre relay
Bronze	José Alvarez, Miguel Calderón, Rafael Cañizares, Pedro Chappé, Juan Carlos Domecq, Ruperto Herrera, Tomás Herrera, Conrado Pérez, Juan Roca, Franklin Standard, Alejandro Urgellés, and Oscar Varona	Basketball	Men's team
Bronze	Douglas Rodríguez	Boxing	Men's flyweight

== Athletics ==
Men's 100 metres

- Hermes Ramírez
  - First Heat — DNS (→ did not advance)
- Pablo Montes
  - First Heat — DNS (→ did not advance)

Men's High Jump

- Irolan Hechavarria
  - Qualification Round — DNS (→ did not advance)

Men's 4 × 100 m Relay

- José Triana, Juan Morales, Hermes Ramírez, and Pablo Montes
  - Heat — 39.65s
  - Semifinals — 39.04s (→ did not advance)

== Boxing ==
Men's Welterweight (– 67 kg)

- Emilio Correa → Gold Medal
  - First round — Bye
  - Second round — defeated Damiano Lassandro (ITA), 5:0
  - Third round — defeated Manfred Wolke (GDR), TKO-2
  - Quarterfinals — defeated Günther Meier (FRG), 3:2
  - Semifinals — defeated Jesse Valdez (USA), 3:2
  - Final — defeated János Kajdi (HUN), 5:0

Men's Light Middleweight (– 71 kg)

- Rolando Garbey
  - First round — defeated Ricky Barnor (GHA), 5:0
  - Second round — defeated Franz Csandl (AUT), 5:0
  - Third round — defeated Jae Keun-Lim (KOR), TKO-2
  - Quarterfinals — lost to Wiesław Rudkowski (POL), 1:4

Men's Heavyweight (+ 81 kg)

- Teófilo Stevenson → Gold Medal
  - First round — defeated Ludwik Denderys (POL), TKO-1
  - Quarterfinals — defeated Duane Bobick (USA), TKO-3
  - Semifinals — defeated Peter Hussing (FRG), TKO-2
  - Final — defeated Ion Alexe (ROU), walk-over

== Cycling ==
Six cyclists represented Cuba in 1972.

Individual road race

- Gregorio Aldo Arencibia — 75th place
- Raúl Marcelo Vázquez — did not finish (→ no ranking)
- José Prieto — did not finish (→ no ranking)
- Pedro Rodríguez — did not finish (→ no ranking)

Team time trial

- Gregorio Aldo Arencibia
- Roberto Menéndez
- Pedro Rodríguez
- Raúl Marcelo Vázquez

Individual pursuit

- Roberto Heredero

Team pursuit

- Gregorio Aldo Arencibia
- Roberto Heredero
- Roberto Menéndez
- Raúl Marcelo Vázquez

== Fencing ==
15 fencers, 10 men and 5 women, represented Cuba in 1972.

Men's foil

- Eduardo Jhons
- Jesús Gil
- Enrique Salvat

Men's team foil

- Evelio González, Eduardo Jhons, Jesús Gil, Enrique Salvat, Jorge Garbey

Men's sabre

- Manuel Ortíz
- Guzman Salazar
- Francisco de la Torre

Men's team sabre

- Hilario Hipólito, Guzman Salazar, Francisco de la Torre, Manuel Ortíz, Manuel Suárez

Women's foil

- Margarita Rodríguez
- Marlene Infante
- María Esther García

Women's team foil

- Irene Forbes, María Esther García, Marlene Infante, Margarita Rodríguez, Nereida Rodríguez

== Judo ==
Men's Lightweight

- Héctor Rodríguez

Men's Middleweight

- Isaac Azcuy

Men's Half-Heavyweight

- José Ibañez

== Rowing ==
Men's Coxed Pairs

- Lázaro Rivero, Teófilo Lores and Jesús Rosello
  - Heat — 8:17.34
  - Repechage — 8:37.14 (→ did not advance)

Men's Coxless Fours

- Eralio Cabrera, Troadio Delgado, Ramón Luperón, and Angel Serra

== Shooting ==
Eight male shooters represented Cuba in 1972.

25 m pistol

- Arturo Costa

50 m pistol

- Santiago Trompeta

300 m rifle, three positions

- Miguel Valdes

50 m rifle, three positions

- Miguel Valdes
- Raúl Llanos

50 m rifle, prone

- Humberto Cabrera
- Adelso Peña

Skeet

- Roberto Castrillo
- Servilio Torres

== Volleyball ==
Men's Team Competition

- Preliminary Round (Group B)
  - Lost to East Germany (0-3)
  - Lost to Japan (0-3)
  - Defeated West Germany (3-2)
  - Lost to Romania (0-3)
  - Defeated Brazil (3-2)
- Classification Match
  - 9th/10th place: Lost to Poland (0-3) → Tenth place
- Team Roster
  - Alfredo Figueredo
  - Antonio Rodríguez
  - Carlos Dilaut
  - Diego Lapera
  - Enrique Fortes
  - Ernesto Martínez
  - Jorge Pérez Vento
  - Lorenzo Martínez
  - Luis Calderon
  - Luis Jiménez
  - Orlando Samuell
  - Pedro Delgado
