= Australia at the 1972 Summer Olympics =

- IOC code: AUS
- NOC: Australian Olympic Federation

in Munich
- Competitors: 168 (139 men, 29 women) in 20 sports
- Flag bearers: Dennis Green (opening); Michael Wenden (closing)
- Medals Ranked 6th: Gold 8 Silver 7 Bronze 2 Total 17

Summer Olympics appearances (overview)
- 1896; 1900; 1904; 1908; 1912; 1920; 1924; 1928; 1932; 1936; 1948; 1952; 1956; 1960; 1964; 1968; 1972; 1976; 1980; 1984; 1988; 1992; 1996; 2000; 2004; 2008; 2012; 2016; 2020; 2024

Other related appearances
- 1906 Intercalated Games –––– Australasia (1908–1912)

Australia competed at the 1972 Summer Olympics in Munich, West Germany. Australian athletes have competed in every Summer Olympic Games. 168 competitors, 139 men and 29 women, took part in 110 events in 20 sports.

== Medalists ==
=== Gold ===
- Shane Gould — Swimming, Women's 200m Individual Medley
- Shane Gould — Swimming, Women's 200m Freestyle
- Shane Gould — Swimming, Women's 400m Freestyle
- Beverley Whitfield — Swimming, Women's 200m Breaststroke
- Gail Neall — Swimming, Women's 400m Individual Medley
- Bradford Cooper — Swimming, Men's 400m Freestyle
- John Anderson and David Forbes — Sailing, Men's Star Team Competition
- Thomas Anderson, John Cuneo and John Shaw — Sailing, Men's Dragon Team Competition

=== Silver ===
- Raelene Boyle — Athletics, Women's 100m
- Raelene Boyle — Athletics, Women's 200m
- John Nicholson — Cycling, Men's 1.000m Sprint (Scratch)
- Danny Clark — Cycling, Men's 1.000m Time Trial
- Clyde Sefton — Cycling, Men's Individual Road Race
- Shane Gould — Swimming, Women's 800m Freestyle
- Graham Windeatt — Swimming, Men's 1.500m Freestyle

=== Bronze ===
- Shane Gould — Swimming, Women's 100m Freestyle
- Beverley Whitfield — Swimming, Women's 100m Breaststroke

== Archery ==
In the first modern archery competition at the Olympics, Australia entered two men and one woman. Their highest placing competitors were Terene Donovan and Graeme Telford, who both placed 9th place in their respective competitions.

Women's Individual Competition:

- Terene Donovan - 2356 points (→ 9th place)

Men's Individual Competition:

- Graeme Telford - 2423 points (→ 9th place)
- Terry Reilly - 2387 points (→ 15th place)

== Athletics ==
Men's 800 metres

- Graeme Rootham
  - Heat — 1:48.2 (→ did not advance)

Men's 1.500 metres

- Chris Fisher
  - Heat — 3:42.5
  - Semifinals — 3:42.0 (→ did not advance)

Men's 5.000 metres

- Tony Benson
  - Heat — 13:42.8 (→ did not advance)
- Kerry O'Brien
  - Heat — did not start (→ did not advance)

Men's 3.000m Steeplechase

- Kerry O'Brien
  - Qualifying Heat — did not finish (→ did not advance)

Men's High Jump

- Lawrie Peckham
  - Qualifying Round — 2.15m
  - Final — 2.10m (→ 18th place)

== Basketball ==
Men's Team Competition

- Preliminary Round (Group A):
  - Lost to Spain (74-79)
  - Lost to United States (55-81)
  - Lost to Czechoslovakia (68-69)
  - Defeated Japan (92-76)
  - Lost to Cuba (70-84)
  - Defeated Brazil (75-69)
  - Defeated Egypt (89-66)
- Classification Matches:
  - 9th/12th place: Defeated West Germany (70-69)
  - 9th/10th place: Defeated Poland (91-83) → 9th place
- Team Roster:
  - Glenn Marsland
  - Ian Watson
  - Richard Duke
  - Bill Wyatt
  - Eddie Palubinskas
  - Brian Kerle
  - Peter Byrne
  - Perry Crosswhite
  - Ray Tomlinson
  - Ken James
  - Tom Bender
  - Toli Koltuniewicz
- Head coach: Lindsay Gaze

== Boxing ==
Men's Light Middleweight (– 71 kg)

- Alan Jenkinson
  - First Round — Bye
  - Second Round — Defeated Michel Belliard (FRA), 4:1
  - Third Round — Lost to Mohamed Majeri (TUN), 0:5

== Cycling ==
Ten cyclists represented Australia in 1972.

Individual road race

- Clyde Sefton — Silver Medal
- David Jose — 29th place
- John Trevorrow — 32nd place
- Donald Allan — 58th place

Team time trial

- Donald Allan
- Graeme Jose
- Clyde Sefton
- John Trevorrow

Sprint

- John Nicholson

1000m time trial

- Daniel Clark
  - Final — 1:06.87 (→ Silver Medal)

Individual pursuit

- John Bylsma

Team pursuit

- Steele Bishop
- Danny Clark
- Remo Sansonetti
- Philip Sawyer

== Diving ==
Men's 3m Springboard:

- Donald Wagstaff — 344.13 points (→ 13th place)
- Kenneth Grove — 302.91 points (→ 29th place)

Men's 10m Platform:

- Donald Wagstaff — 435.84 points (→ 11th place)
- Kenneth Grove — 254.73 points (→ 32nd place)

Women's 10m Platform:

- Glenise-Ann Jones — 157.20 points (→ 26th place)

== Fencing ==
Four fencers, two men and two women, represented Australia in 1972.

Men's foil

- Ernest Simon
- Greg Benko

Women's foil

- Marion Exelby
- Christine McDougall

== Hockey ==
Men's Team Competition

- Preliminary Round (Group B)
  - Drew with New Zealand (0-0)
  - Defeated Kenya (3-1)
  - Lost to India (1-3)
  - Defeated Mexico (10-0)
  - Drew with Great Britain (1-1)
  - Defeated Poland (1-0)
  - Lost to the Netherlands (2-3)
- Semi Final Round
  - Defeated Malaysia (2-1)
- Classification Match
  - 5th/6th place: Defeated Great Britain (2-1) after extra time → 5th place
- Team Roster
  - Robert Andrew
  - Greg Browning
  - Ric Charlesworth
  - Paul Dearing
  - Brian Glencross
  - Robert Haigh
  - Wayne Hammond
  - James Mason
  - Terry McAskell
  - Patrick Nilan
  - Desmond Piper
  - Graeme Reid
  - Ronald Riley
  - Donald Smart
  - Ronald Wilson

== Modern pentathlon ==
Two male pentathletes represented Australia in 1972.

Men's Individual Competition:

- Robert Barrie — 4600 points (→ 32nd place)
- Peter Macken — 4449 points (→ 41st place)

== Shooting ==
Four male shooters represented Australia in 1972.

Mixed

Athlete	Event	Final	
Athlete	Event	Score	Rank
Donald Brook	50 m rifle, prone	596	10
Russell Dove	50 m rifle, prone	593	25
Sperry Marshall	Trap	186	22
Alexander Taransky	25 m pistol	586	18

== Swimming ==
Men's 100m Freestyle

- Michael Wenden
  - Heat — 52.34s
  - Semifinals — 53.32s
  - Final — 52.41s (→ 5th place)
- Greg Rogers
  - Heat — 53.98s
  - Semifinals — 54.26s (→ did not advance)
- Neil Rogers
  - Heat — 55.32s (→ did not advance)

Men's 200m Freestyle

- Michael Wenden
  - Heat — 1:56.66
  - Final — 1:54.40 (→ 4th place)
- Graham White
  - Heat — 1:58.60 (→ did not advance)
- Robert Nay
  - Heat — 1:57.69 (→ did not advance)

Men's 4 × 100 m Freestyle Relay

- Neil Rogers, Graham White, Bruce Featherston and Greg Rogers
  - Heat — 3:40.47 (→ did not advance)

Men's 4 × 200 m Freestyle Relay

- Graham Windeatt, Bruce Featherstone, Michael Wenden, and Graham White
  - Heat — 7:49.03
- Michael Wenden, Graham Windeatt, Robert Nay, and Bradford Cooper
  - Final — 7:48.66 (→ 5th place)

Men's 200m Butterfly

- James Norman Findlay
  - Heat — 2:08.36 ( 4th Place)

Men's 200m Individual Medley

- James Norman Findlay
  - Heat — 2:20.08 ( 6th Place)

== See also ==
- Australia at the 1970 British Commonwealth Games
- Australia at the 1974 British Commonwealth Games
