= Nobuo =

- Gender: Male

Origin
- Origin: Japanese
- Meaning: Different meanings depending on the kanji used

Nobuo (written: 信男, 信雄, 伸郎, 伸夫, 宣生, のぶお in hiragana or ノブオ in katakana) is a masculine, Japanese given name. Notable people with the name include:

- Nobuo Amayake (天宅 信雄; born 1934), Japanese professional Go player
- Nobuo Aoyagi (青柳 信雄; 1903–1976), Japanese film director and film producer
- Nobuo Chigusa (千種 信雄; born 1948), Japanese basketball player
- Nobuo Fujita (藤田 信雄; 1911–1997), Warrant Flying Officer of the Imperial Japanese Navy
- Nobuo Hattori (服部 信雄; born 1947), Japanese basketball player
- Nobuo Ikeda (池田 信夫; born 1953), Japanese economist
- Nobuo Kaiho (海保 宣生; 1941–2015), Japanese basketball player
- Nobuo Kaneko (金子 信雄; 1923–1995), Japanese actor
- Nobuo Kawai (川合 伸旺; 1932–2006), Japanese actor
- Nobuo Kishi (岸 信夫; born 1959), Japanese politician
- Nobuo Kojima (小島 信夫; 1915–2006), Japanese writer
- Nobuo Kyo (姜 暢雄; born 1979), Japanese actor
- Nobuo Matsuno (松野 信夫; born 1951), Japanese politician
- Nobuo Mii (三井 信雄; 1931–2015), Japanese computer pioneer
- Nobuo Kanda (神田 信夫; 1921–2003), Japanese historian
- Nobuo Nakagawa (中川 信夫; 1905–1984), Japanese film director
- Nobuo Nakamura (中村 伸郎; 1908–1991), Japanese actor
- Nobuo Nashiro (名城 信男; born 1981), Japanese boxer
- Nobuo Noda (野田 信夫; 1893–1993), Japanese business scholar
- Nobuo Okishio (置塩 信雄; 1927–2003), Japanese economist
- Nobuo Sasaki (佐々木 信男; born 1956), Japanese handball player
- Nobuo Satō (佐藤 信夫; born 1942), former Japanese figure skater and current coach
- Nobuo Sekine (関根 伸夫; 1942–2019), Japanese sculptor
- Nobuo Suga (born 1933), Japanese biologist, known for hearing research
- Nobuo Tanaka (田中 伸男; born 1950), former executive director of the International Energy Agency
- Paul Nobuo Tatsuguchi (1911–1943), war participant
- Nobuo Tobita (飛田 展男; born 1959), Japanese voice actor
- Nobuo Uematsu (植松 伸夫; born 1959), Japanese composer of video game music
- Nobuo Yana (八名 信夫; born 1935), Japanese film actor
- Nobuo Yoneda (米田 信夫; 1930–1996), Japanese mathematician and computer scientist

== See also ==
- Ina Nobuo Award, an annual award given by Nikon Salon
