= Pedro Delgado (disambiguation) =

Pedro Delgado is a Spanish professional road bicycle racer.

Pedro Delgado may also refer to:

- Pedro Delgado (Venezuelan footballer)
- Pedro Delgado (Portuguese footballer) (born 1997), Portuguese footballer for Shandong Luneng Taishan
- Pedro Delgado (athlete), Spanish Paralympic athlete
- Pedro Delgado (volleyball) (born 1949), Cuban volleyball player
- Pedro Delgado (rugby union) (born 1997), Argentine rugby union player
- Pedro Delgado Campaña, former Governor of the Central Bank of Ecuador
- Pedro Delgado Hernández (born 1956), Puerto Rican attorney and United States District Judge
- Pedro Pérez Delgado (1881–1924), Venezuelan revolutionary and politician

== See also ==
- Delgado, a common Spanish surname
