= Richard Duke (disambiguation) =

Richard Duke (1658–1711) was an English poet.

Richard Duke may also refer to:

- Richard Duke (basketball) (born 1948), Australian Olympic basketball player
- Richard Duke (English lawyer) (c. 1515–1572), Member of Parliament for Weymouth
- Richard Duke (violin maker) (1718–1783), English violin maker
- Richard Duke (1652–1733), landowner and Member of Parliament for Ashburton
- Richard Thomas Walker Duke (1822–1898), Virginia congressman and lawyer

== See also ==
- Richard, Duke of York (disambiguation)
