= Basketball at the 1999 Pan American Games =

- Venue: Winnipeg Arena
- Dates: July 31 – August 8, 1999
- Teams: 8

This page shows the results of the basketball tournament at the 1999 Pan American Games, held in the Winnipeg Arena in Winnipeg, Manitoba, Canada from July 31 to August 8, 1999.

== Men's tournament ==
Group A	Group B
Argentina; Canada; Puerto Rico; Uruguay	Brazil; Cuba; Dominican Republic; United States

=== Preliminary round ===
==== Group A ====
Team	Pts	Pld	W	L	PF	PA	Diff
Puerto Rico	6	3	3	0	256	220	+36
Argentina	5	3	2	1	235	240	–5
Canada	4	3	1	2	203	193	+10
Uruguay	3	3	0	3	203	244	–41

August 1, 1999

Canada	75–50	Uruguay
Puerto Rico	96–83	Argentina

August 2, 1999

Puerto Rico	90–76	Uruguay
Argentina	73–67	Canada

August 4, 1999

Argentina	79–77	Uruguay
Puerto Rico	70–61	Canada

==== Group B ====
Team	Pts	Pld	W	L	PF	PA	Diff
United States	6	3	3	0	257	202	+55
Brazil	5	3	2	1	259	217	+42
Dominican Republic	4	3	1	2	236	273	–37
Cuba	3	3	0	3	196	256	–60

July 31, 1999

United States	89–48	Cuba
Brazil	102–72	Dominican Republic

August 1, 1999

United States	73–71	Brazil
Dominican Republic	81–76	Cuba

August 4, 1999

Brazil	86–72	Cuba
United States	95–83	Dominican Republic

=== Classification natches ===
August 7, 1999 – Seventh place

Cuba	85–79	Uruguay

August 7, 1999 – Fifth place

Canada	111–65	Dominican Republic

=== Knockout stages ===
Semi-finals
August 6, 1999 – Winnipeg Arena
Brazil	95
Puerto Rico	85
August 6, 1999 – Winnipeg Arena
United States	84
Argentina	76

Final
August 8, 1999 – Winnipeg Arena
Brazil	95
United States	78
Third place
August 8, 1999 – Winnipeg Arena
Puerto Rico	87
Argentina	60

=== Final standings ===
Rank	Team	Record	PF : PA
1st place, gold medalist(s)	Brazil	4 – 1	449 : 380
2nd place, silver medalist(s)	United States	4 – 1	419 : 373
3rd place, bronze medalist(s)	Puerto Rico	4 – 1	428 : 375
4	Argentina	2 – 3	371 : 411
5	Canada	2 – 2	314 : 258
6	Dominican Republic	1 – 3	301 : 384
7	Cuba	1 – 3	281 : 335
8	Uruguay	0 – 4	282 : 329

=== Awards ===
==== Topscorer ====
1999 Pan American Games winners

Brazil
Third title

=== Men's team rosters ===
(Argentina) ARGENTINA

- Sergio Aispurua
- Gabriel Fernández
- Manu Ginóbili
- Leonardo Gutiérrez
- Wálter Herrmann
- Hernán Jasen
- Martín Leiva
- Andrés Nocioni
- Alejandro Olivares
- Leandro Palladino
- Facundo Sucatzky
- Lucas Victoriano

(Brazil) BRAZIL

- Aylton Tesch
- Caio Cazziolato
- Demétrius Ferraciu
- Helio García
- André Guimarães
- Guilherme Giovannoni
- Rogério Klafke
- Marcelo Machado
- Vanderlei Mazuchini
- Michel Nascimiento
- Aristides Santos
- Sandro Varejão

(Canada) CANADA

- Richard Anderson
- Hennssy Auriantal
- Rowan Barrett
- Sherman Hamilton
- Todd MacCulloch
- Andrew Mavis
- Jordie McTavish
- Michael Meeks
- Greg Newton
- Shawn Swords
- Keith Vassell
- Jesse Young

(Cuba) CUBA

- Yudit Abreu
- Roberto Amaro
- Edel Casanova
- Sergio Ferrer
- Andrés González
- Radbel Hechevarria
- Angel Nuñez
- Elieser Rojas
- Ariel Ruedas
- Ernesto Simon
- Juan Vazquez
- Amiel Vega

(Dominican Republic) DOMINICAN REPUBLIC

- Luis Flores
- Henry Lalane
- Oscaris Lenderborg
- Moises Michel
- José Utuado Molina
- Manuel Monegro
- Jaime Peterson
- Angel Romer
- Ángel Sánchez
- Joel Suarez

(Puerto Rico) PUERTO RICO

- Luis Allende
- Ricardo Dalmau
- Sharif Fajardo
- Arnaldo Febres
- Rolando Hourruitiner
- Antonio Latimer
- Fernando Ortíz
- Edgar Padilla
- Daniel Santiago
- Carmelo Travieso
- Orlando Vega

(United States) UNITED STATES

- Damon Bailey
- James Blackwell
- Michael Hawkins
- Kermit Holmes
- Byron Houston
- Todd Lindeman
- James Martin
- Clinton "Mikki" Moore
- Doug Smith
- Matthew Steigenga
- Carl Thomas
- Travis Williams

(Uruguay) URUGUAY

- Bruno Abratansky
- Adrián Bertolini
- Marcel Bouzout
- Jorge Cabrera
- Diego Castrillon
- Diego Losada
- Nicolás Mazzarino
- Oscar Moglia
- Pablo Morales
- Luis Silveira
- Martín Suárez
- Hugo Vázquez

=== Awards ===
- Topscorer :

== Women's tournament ==
- Argentina
- Brazil
- Canada
- Cuba
- Dominican Republic
- United States

=== Round robin ===
Team	Pts	Pld	W	L	PF	PA	Diff
Brazil	10	5	5	0	422	342	+80
Cuba	8	5	4	1	438	309	+129
United States	6	5	3	2	353	353	0
Canada	4	5	2	3	320	331	–11
Argentina	2	5	1	4	298	337	–39
Dominican Republic	0	5	0	5	333	492	–159

July 30, 1999

Brazil	84–78	Cuba
Canada	89–75	Dominican Republic
United States	63–55	Argentina

July 31, 1999

Cuba	95–64	United States
Canada	61–48	Argentina
Brazil	124–68	Dominican Republic

August 1, 1999

Brazil	70–59	Canada
United States	92–80	Dominican Republic
Cuba	76–56	Argentina

August 2, 1999

Cuba	76–65	Argentina
Brazil	77–72	United States
Argentina	74–70	Dominican Republic

August 4, 1999

United States	62–46	Canada
Brazil	67–65	Argentina
Cuba	113–40	Dominican Republic

=== Classification match ===
August 6, 1999 – Fifth place

Argentina	98–80	Dominican Republic

=== Knockout stages ===
Semi-finals
August 5, 1999 – Winnipeg Arena
Cuba	87
United States	78
August 5, 1999 – Winnipeg Arena
Canada	56
Brazil	54

Final
August 7, 1999 – Winnipeg Arena
Cuba	72
Canada	63
Third place
August 7, 1999 – Winnipeg Arena
United States	85
Brazil	59

=== Final standings ===
Rank	Team	Record	PF : PA
1st place, gold medalist(s)	Cuba	6 – 1	597 : 450
2nd place, silver medalist(s)	Canada	3 – 4	439 : 457
3rd place, bronze medalist(s)	United States	4 – 3	516 : 499
4	Brazil	5 – 2	535 : 483
5	Argentina	2 – 4	396 : 417
6	Dominican Republic	0 – 6	413 : 590

1999 Pan American Games winners

Cuba
Second title

=== Women's team rosters ===
(Brazil) BRAZIL

- Adriana Santos
- Adriana Pinto
- Cíntia Santos
- Helen Cristina Santos Luz
- Kelly Santos
- Lilian Gonçalves
- Patrícia Silva
- Ilisaine David
- Leila de Souza
- Rosângela Pereira
- Roseli Gustavo

(United States) UNITED STATES

- Edwina Brown
- Sylvia Crawley
- Beth Cunningham
- Katryna Gaither
- Amy Herrig
- Michelle M. Marciniak
- Danielle McCulley
- Lynn Pride
- Itoro Umoh-Coleman
- DeMya Walker
- Umeki Webb
- Dana Wynne
