= Cuba men's national basketball team =

Cuba
- FIBA ranking: 69 (2 December 2025)
- Joined FIBA: 1937; 89 years ago
- FIBA zone: FIBA Americas
- National federation: Cuba Basketball Federation
- Coach: Onel Planas

Olympic Games
- Appearances: 6
- Medals: Bronze: 1972

FIBA World Cup
- Appearances: 4
- Medals: None

FIBA AmeriCup
- Appearances: 10
- Medals: None
Home	Away

The Cuba men's national basketball team (Spanish: Selección masculina de baloncesto de Cuba) represents Cuba at international competitions. It won the bronze medal at 1972 Summer Olympics and finished in 4th place at the 1974 FIBA World Championship. It is the only team from the Caribbean to win a medal at a major global event.

== Competitive record ==
=== Olympics ===
Year	Position	Tournament	Host
1948	13th	Basketball at the 1948 Summer Olympics	London, United Kingdom
1952	9th	Basketball at the 1952 Summer Olympics	Helsinki, Finland
1968	11th	Basketball at the 1968 Summer Olympics	Mexico City, Mexico
1972	(3rd place)	Basketball at the 1972 Summer Olympics	Munich, West Germany
1976	7th	Basketball at the 1976 Summer Olympics	Montreal, Canada
1980	6th	Basketball at the 1980 Summer Olympics	Moscow, Soviet Union

=== Friendship Games ===
Year	Position	Tournament	Host
1984	(3rd place)	Basketball at the Friendship Games	Moscow, Soviet Union

=== FIBA World Cup ===
Year	Position	Tournament	Host
1970	8th	1970 FIBA World Championship	Yugoslavia
1974	4th	1974 FIBA World Championship	Puerto Rico
1986	11th	1986 FIBA World Championship	Spain
1994	15th	1994 FIBA World Championship	Canada

=== FIBA AmeriCup ===
Year	Position	Tournament	Host
1980	6th	1980 Tournament of the Americas	San Juan, Puerto Rico
1984	8th	1984 Tournament of the Americas	São Paulo, Brazil
1989	7th	1989 Tournament of the Americas	Mexico City, Mexico
1992	8th	1992 Tournament of the Americas	Portland, United States
1993	5th	1993 Tournament of the Americas	San Juan, Puerto Rico
1995	5th	1995 Tournament of the Americas	Tucumán, Argentina
1997	6th	1997 FIBA Americas Championship	Montevideo, Uruguay
1999	10th	1999 FIBA Americas Championship	San Juan, Puerto Rico
2011	10th	2011 FIBA Americas Championship	Mar del Plata, Argentina
2015	10th	2015 FIBA Americas Championship	Mexico City, Mexico

=== Pan American Games ===
- 1951: (bronze)
- 1955: 5th
- 1959: 6th
- 1963: Did not compete
- 1967: 4th
- 1971: (bronze)
- 1975: 5th
- 1979: 4th
- 1983: 7th
- 1987: Did not compete
- 1991: 4th
- 1995: Did not compete
- 1999: 7th
- 2003-2019: Did not compete
- 2023: To be determined

=== Centrobasket ===
- 1989: (bronze)
- 1991: (bronze)
- 1993: (silver)
- 1995: (gold)
- 1997: (gold)
- 1999: (gold)
- 2001: 6th
- 2003: Did not compete
- 2004: 5th
- 2006: 6th
- 2008: 4th
- 2010: 4th
- 2012: 8th
- 2014: 4th
- 2016: 6th

=== Caribebasket ===
- 1981-1996: ?
- 1998-2002: Did not compete
- 2004: (gold)
- 2006: (bronze)
- 2007: (bronze)
- 2009: (bronze)
- 2011: Did not compete
- 2014: (silver)
- 2015: Did not compete

== Current roster ==
=== Cuba ===
Cuba National Basketball Team roster
Players
Coaches

Pos.	No.	Name	Age – Date of birth	Height	Club
G/F	0	Karel Guzman	25 – 7 February 1995	1.95 m (6 ft 5 in)	Capitalinos	(Cuba)
SF	2	Yoanki Mensia	22 – 23 September 1997	1.96 m (6 ft 5 in)	Gimnasia y Esgrima	(Argentina)
PG	5	Osmel Oliva	32 – 24 April 1987	1.78 m (5 ft 10 in)	Capitalinos	(Cuba)
F	9	Lisvan Valdes	32 – 21 January 1988	1.96 m (6 ft 5 in)	Santa Tecla BC	(El Salvador)
PG	12	Yuniskel Molina	26 – 28 March 1993	1.85 m (6 ft 1 in)
C	0	Jasiel Rivero	26 – 31 October 1993	2.04 m (6 ft 8 in)	CB Miraflores	(Spain)
PF	15	Marvin Cairo	28 – 13 August 1991	1.98 m (6 ft 6 in)	Piratas de Imbabura	(Ecuador)
G/F	19	Pedro Bombino	19 – 21 March 2000	2.08 m (6 ft 10 in)	Gimnasia y Esgrima	(Argentina)
	23	Raudelis Guerra	26 – 19 June 1993
	24	Neslier Abreu	27 – 16 January 1993
PF	36	Yoel Cubilla	25 – 25 December 1994	2.04 m (6 ft 8 in)
G	55	Pedro Roque	24 – 28 June 1995	1.88 m (6 ft 2 in)

Head coach

- (Cuba) Jose Andres Ramirez Paz

Assistant coach(es)

- (Cuba) Yoanis Zaldivar Anderson
- (Cuba) Eduardo Moya

Legend

- Club field describes latest professional club
- Age field is age on February 21, 2020
- (C) – Team Captain

=== Past roster ===
Roster for the 2015 FIBA Americas Championship.

Cuba National Basketball Team roster
Players
Coaches

Pos.	No.	Name	Age – Date of birth	Height	Club
G/F	4	Karel Guzman	20 – 7 February 1995	1.88 m (6 ft 2 in)	Capitalinos	(Cuba)
PG	5	Osmel Oliva	28 – 24 April 1987	1.78 m (5 ft 10 in)	Artemisa	(Cuba)
C	6	Javier Justiz	22 – 18 September 1992	2.10 m (6 ft 11 in)	Basket Zaragoza	(Spain)
G	7	Yaser Rodriguez	27 – 1 January 1988	1.86 m (6 ft 1 in)	Ciego de Avila (basketball)	(Cuba)
SF	9	Livan Valdez	27 – 21 January 1988	1.95 m (6 ft 5 in)	Capitalinos	(Cuba)
SG	10	William Granda (C)	30 – 8 August 1985	1.89 m (6 ft 2 in)	Club Atlético Tabaré	(Uruguay)
PG	11	Yuniskel Molina	22 – 28 March 1993	1.85 m (6 ft 1 in)	Pinar del Rio	(Cuba)
C	12	Joan Luis Haiti	33 – 20 April 1982	2.00 m (6 ft 7 in)	Ciego de Avila (basketball)	(Cuba)
SF	13	Esteban Martinez	28 – 8 May 1987	1.92 m (6 ft 4 in)	Santiago de Cuba	(Cuba)
PF	14	Orestes Torres	28 – 26 February 1987	2.03 m (6 ft 8 in)	Capitalinos	(Cuba)
PF	15	Jasiel Rivero	21 – 31 October 1993	2.04 m (6 ft 8 in)	Club Atlético Tabaré	(Uruguay)
F/C	16	Yoel Cubilla	20 – 25 December 1994	2.04 m (6 ft 8 in)	Ciego de Avila (basketball)	(Cuba)

Head coach

- (Cuba) Daniel Scott

Assistant coach(es)

- (Cuba) Leonardo Perez

Legend

- Club field describes latest professional club
- Age field is age on August 30, 2015
- (C) – Team Captain

=== Depth chart ===
Pos.	Starting 5	Bench 1	Bench 2
C	Javier Justiz	Yoan Luis	Abel Font
PF	Yoel Cubilla	Orestes Torres
SF	Livan Valdez	Yoanki Mensia	Yordanis Jaca
SG	Karel Guzman	William Granda
PG	Yaser Rodriguez	Osmel Oliva

== Head coach position ==
- (Cuba) Daniel Scott: 2001–2011
- (Cuba) Leonardo Perez: 2012–2014
- (Cuba) Daniel Scott: 2015–2017
- (Cuba) Yoanis Zaldivar: 2017
- (Cuba) José "Pepe" Ramírez: 2017-2019
- (Cuba) Eduardo Moya: 2020-present

== Past rosters ==
1948 Olympic Games: finished 13th among 23 teams

Alfredo "Bebo" Faget, Francisco "Frank" Lavernia, Raúl García Ordóñez, Federico "Fico" López, Casimiro García Artime, Juan García, José Llanusa, Ramón Wiltz, Mario Agüero, Joaquín Agüero, Mario Quintero, Fabio Ruiz, Llaneras Rodríguez, Otero Vázquez, José Miguel Álvarez Pozo

1952 Olympic Games: finished 14th among 23 teams

Alfredo "Bebo" Faget, Carlos García Ordóñez, Federico "Fico" López, Juan García, Casimiro García Artime, Ramón Wiltz, Mario Quintero, Fabio Ruiz, Mario Agüero, Felipe de la Pozas y Piad, Carlos Bea, Armando Estrada Rivero, Alberto Escoto Valdés

1968 Olympic Games: finished 11th among 16 teams

Ruperto Herrera Tabio, Pedro Chappe Garcia, Franklin Standard, Rafael Cañizares, Conrado Pérez, Pablo García, Cesar Valdés, Inocente Cuesta, Jacinto González, Miguel Montalvo, Miguel Calderón Gómez, Carlos del Pozo (Coach: Stepas Butautas)

1970 World Championship: finished 8th among 13 teams

Ruperto Herrera Tabio, Pedro Chappe Garcia, Franklin Standard, Conrado Pérez, Tomás Herrera Martínez, Rafael Cañizares, Juan Domecq, Miguel Álvarez Pozo, Alejandro Urgelles Guibot, Oscar Varona Varona, Miguel Calderón Gómez, Francisco Varona (Coach: Stepas Butautas)

1972 Olympic Games: finished 3rd among 16 teams

Ruperto Herrera Tabio, Pedro Chappe Garcia, Juan Domecq, Franklin Standard, Alejandro Urgelles Guibot, Rafael Cañizares, Oscar Varona Varona, Tomás Herrera Martínez, Miguel Álvarez Pozo, Miguel Calderón Gómez, Juan Roca Brunet, Conrado Pérez (Coach: Juan Carmelo Ortega Díaz)

1974 World Championship: finished 4th among 14 teams

Ruperto Herrera Tabio, Pedro Chappe Garcia, Miguel Álvarez Pozo, Tomás Herrera Martínez, Juan Domecq, Oscar Varona Varona, Miguel Calderón Gómez, Alejandro Urgelles Guibot, Rafael Cañizares, Conrado Pérez, Juan Roca Brunet, Alejandro Lázaro Ortiz (Coach: Juan Carmelo Ortega Díaz)

1976 Olympic Games: finished 7th among 12 teams

Ruperto Herrera Tabio, Pedro Chappe Garcia, Juan Domecq, Tomás Herrera Martínez, Oscar Varona Varona, Félix Morales, Alejandro Urgelles Guibot, Daniel Scott, Rafael Cañizares, Juan Roca Brunet, Alejandro Lázaro Ortiz, Ángel Padrón (Coach: Juan Carmelo Ortega Díaz)

1980 Olympic Games: finished 6th among 12 teams

Ruperto Herrera Tabio, Tomás Herrera Martínez, Miguel Calderón Gómez, Félix Morales, Daniel Scott, Alejandro Urgelles Guibot, Alejandro Lázaro Ortiz, Raúl Dubois, Pedro Abreu, Jorge More, Generoso Márquez, Noangel Luaces (Coach: Pedro Chappe Garcia)

1986 World Championship: finished 11th among 24 teams

Daniel Scott, Félix Morales, Raúl Dubois, Pedro Abreu, Luis Calderón, Noangel Luaces, Eduardo Cabrera, Luciano Rivero, Roberto Simón Salomón, Leonardo Pérez, José Carlos Caballero, Pedro Cobarrubia (Coach: Juan Carmelo Ortega Díaz)

1994 World Championship: finished 15th among 16 teams

Richard Matienzo, Leonardo Pérez, Lazaro Borrell, Roberto Carlos Herrera, Roberto Simón Salomón, Ángel Oscar Caballero, Augusto Duquesne, Ulises Goire, José Luis Díaz, Juan Leopoldo Vázquez, Edel Casanova, Yudit Abreu (Coach: Miguel Calderón Gómez)

== See also ==
- Cuba women's national basketball team
- Cuba national under-19 basketball team
- Cuba national under-17 basketball team
- Cuba national 3x3 team
- Legionarios del Baloncesto Cubano
