= Pierre Sagna =

Pierre Sagna can refer to:

- Pierre Sagna (bishop) (1932–2008), a Senegalese Roman Catholic bishop
- Pierre Sagna (footballer) (born 1990), a Senegalese footballer
- Pierre Sagna (basketball) (1950–2026), a Senegalese basketball player
