= Sylvestre (given name) =

Sylvestre is a masculine given name of Latin origin derived from Silva, meaning the forest. Notable people with the name include:

- Sylvestre Amoussou (born 1964), Beninese actor and director
- Sylvestre Bangui (1934–1996), Central African general, diplomat and politician
- Sylvestre Ilunga (born 1947), Congolese politician
- Sylvestre Gallot (born 1948), French mathematician
- Sylvestre François Lacroix (1765–1843), French mathematician
- Sylvestre de Laval (1570–1616), French Catholic theologian
- Sylvestre Lopis (born 1947), Senegalese basketball player
- Sylvestre Mudacumura (1954–2019), military leader in Rwanda
- Sylvestre Mudingayi (1912–unknown), Congolese politician
- Sylvestre Nsanzimana (1936–1999), Prime Minister of Rwanda from 12 October 1991 to 2 April 1992
- Sylvestre Ntibantunganya (born 1956), Burundi politician
- Sylvestre Ossiala, Congolese politician
- Sylvestre Radegonde, Seychellois diplomat and politician
- Sylvestre Ranaivo, Malagasy politician
- Sylvestre Ratanga (born c. 1945), Gabonese politician and diplomat
- Sylvestre Salumu (born 1996), Belgian rapper known by the stage name Woodie Smalls

== See also ==
- Sylvestre (disambiguation)
- Saint-Sylvestre (disambiguation)
- San Silvestre (disambiguation)
