= Diandy =

Diandy is a surname. Notable people with the surname include:

- Christophe Diandy (born 1990), Senegalese footballer
- Clayton Diandy (born 2006), Senegalese footballer
- Joseph Diandy (born 1950), Senegalese basketball player
