= Luis Jiménez (volleyball) =

Cuban volleyball player (born 1947)

Personal information
- Full name: Luis Jiménez Méndez
- Nationality: Cuban
- Born: 3 March 1947 (age 79)
- Height: 1.71 m (5 ft 7 in)

Volleyball information
- Position: Setter
- Number: 8

National team
1966–1972	Cuba
Honours
Men's volleyball
Representing Cuba
Pan American Games
Gold medal – first place	1971 Cali	Team
Bronze medal – third place	1967 Winnipeg	Team
Central American and Caribbean Games
Gold medal – first place	1966 San Juan	Team
Gold medal – first place	1970 Panama City	Team

Luis Jiménez (born 3 March 1947) is a retired Cuban volleyball player. He competed in the men's tournament at the 1972 Summer Olympics in Munich, West Germany. He won a bronze medal at the 1967 Pan American Games and a gold medal at the 1971 Pan American Games.
