= Lisván Valdés =

Cuban basketball player

No. 35 – Santa Tecla BC
- Position: Power forward
- League: Liga Mayor de Baloncesto; Liga Centroamericana de clubes de baloncesto

Personal information
- Born: 21 January 1988 (age 38) Guantánamo, Cuba
- Listed height: 1.96 m (6 ft 5 in)

Career information
- Playing career: 2005–present

Career history
- 2018: Santa Tecla BC
- 2020: Indígenas de Matagalpa
- 2021–present: Santa Tecla BC

Career highlights
- 2020 Liga Superior de Baloncesto (Nicaragua) - Champion; 2020 Liga Superior de Baloncesto (Nicaragua) - MVP; 2020 Liga Superior de Baloncesto (Nicaragua) - All Star; 2020 Liga Superior de Baloncesto (Nicaragua) - Top scorer

Lisván Valdés (born 21 January 1988) is a Cuban professional basketball player for Santa Tecla BC of the Liga Mayor de Baloncesto and the Liga Centroamericana de clubes de baloncesto.

== Personal ==
Valdés' home town is Havana.

== Club career ==
In October 2018, Valdés led Santa Tecla BC to the finals of the Liga Mayor de Baloncesto where he contributed 29 points and seven rebounds in the first game against Quetzaltepeque. Yet, he was not able to prevent his team from losing 90-96.

In late 2020, he led his Indígenas de Matagalpa to a three-game sweep of Real Estelí in the final of the Superior Basketball League of Nicaragua. Lisván Valdés was top scorer in that instance, with 83 points, nine baskets from long distance, 14 rebounds and seven assists.

He finished the season as leader in points (676), surpassing his closest pursuer, the Nicaraguan local Jared Ruiz (580), by almost one hundred. Valdés further was the best from long distance (84 triples) and from the line (148 free throws made).

== National team ==
He has been a member of the Cuban men's national basketball team.
