= Enrique Fortes =

Cuban volleyball player (born 1947)

Personal information
- Full name: Enrique Fortes La Rosa
- Nationality: Cuban
- Born: 22 December 1947 (age 78)
- Height: 1.78 m (5 ft 10 in)

Volleyball information
- Number: 10

National team
1966-1972	Cuba
Honours
Men's volleyball
Representing Cuba
Pan American Games
Gold medal – first place	1971 Cali	Team
Bronze medal – third place	1967 Winnipeg	Team
Central American and Caribbean Games
Gold medal – first place	1966 San Juan	Team
Gold medal – first place	1970 Panama City	Team

Enrique Fortes (born 22 December 1947) is a Cuban former volleyball player. He competed in the men's tournament at the 1972 Summer Olympics. He won a bronze medal at the 1967 Pan American Games and a gold medal at the 1971 Pan American Games.
