= Basketball at the 1972 Summer Olympics =

8th Olympic Basketball Tournament
- Munich 1972

Tournament details
- Olympics: 1972 Summer Olympics
- Host nation: West Germany
- City: Munich
- Duration: 27 August – 9 September 1972

Men's tournament
- Teams: 16
Medals
Gold medalists	Soviet Union
Silver medalists	United States
Bronze medalists	Cuba

Tournaments
← Mexico City 1968	Montreal 1976 →

Basketball contests at the 1972 Summer Olympics was the eighth appearance of the sport of basketball as an official Olympic medal event. It took place at Rudi-Sedlmayer-Halle in Munich, Germany from 27 August to 9 September. The Soviet Union controversially won the gold medal game against the United States. This was the first time that the United States did not win a gold medal since the sport's introduction into the Olympics at the 1936 Berlin Summer Games. The bronze was won by Cuba, the only Olympic medal they have won in basketball. Another controversy was suspension of Mickey Coll after a positive drug test.

== Medal summary ==
Games	Gold	Silver	Bronze
Men's basketball	Soviet Union; Anatoli Polivoda; Modestas Paulauskas; Zurab Sakandelidze; Alzhan Zharmukhamedov; Aleksandr Boloshev; Ivan Edeshko; Sergei Belov; Mikheil Korkia; Ivan Dvorny; Gennadi Volnov; Aleksandr Belov; Sergei Kovalenko	United States; Kenneth Davis; Doug Collins; Tom Henderson; Mike Bantom; Robert Jones; Dwight Jones; James Forbes; Jim Brewer; Tommy Burleson; Tom McMillen; Kevin Joyce; Ed Ratleff	Cuba; Juan Carlos Domecq Fortuondo; Ruperto Herrera Tabio; Juan Roca Brunet; Pedro Chappe Garcia; Miguel Álvarez Pozo; Rafael Cañizares Poey; Conrado Perez Armenteros; Miguel Calderon Gomez; Tomas Herrera Martinez; Oscar Varona Varona; Alejandro Urgelles Guibot; Franklin Standard Johnson

== Qualification ==
Automatic qualifications were granted to the host country and the first four places at the previous tournament. Additional spots were decided by various continental tournaments held by FIBA plus an additional pre-Olympic tournament that granted two extra berths.

Means of qualification	Date	Venue	Berths	Qualified
Host nation			1	West Germany
1968 Olympic Tournament	13–25 October 1968	Mexico City	4	United States
1968 Olympic Tournament	13–25 October 1968	Mexico City	4	Yugoslavia
1968 Olympic Tournament	13–25 October 1968	Mexico City	4	Soviet Union
1968 Olympic Tournament	13–25 October 1968	Mexico City	4	Brazil
FIBA Africa Championship 1970	9 –15 March 1970	(Egypt) Alexandria	2	Egypt^{[a]}
FIBA Africa Championship 1970	9 –15 March 1970	(Egypt) Alexandria	2	Senegal
1971 Pan American Games	31 July–12 August 1971	(Colombia) Cali	2	Puerto Rico
1971 Pan American Games	31 July–12 August 1971	(Colombia) Cali	2	Cuba
1971 FIBA Oceania Championship	7–13 August 1971	New Zealand	1	Australia
1971 ABC Championship	30 October – 10 November 1971	(Japan) Tokyo	2	Japan
1971 ABC Championship	30 October – 10 November 1971	(Japan) Tokyo	2	Philippines
European Pre-Olympic Tournament	Various	Various	2	Italy
European Pre-Olympic Tournament	Various	Various	2	Czechoslovakia
Pan-Continental Pre-Olympic Tournament	10–19 August 1972	(West Germany) Augsburg	2	Poland
Pan-Continental Pre-Olympic Tournament	10–19 August 1972	(West Germany) Augsburg	2	Spain
Total			16	

- ^{a} Egypt withdrew from the tournament following the events of the Munich massacre.

== Format ==
- Two groups of eight teams are formed, where the top two from each group compete for the medals in a knockout round.
- The remaining places are defined as follows:
  - Fifth through eighth places are decided in a separate bracket between the third and fourth places from each group in a separate bracket.
  - Ninth through sixteenth places are decided between the fifth through eighth places from each group in separate brackets.

Tie-breaking criteria:

1. Head to head results
2. Goal average (not the goal difference) between the tied teams

== Squads ==
For the team rosters see: Basketball at the 1972 Summer Olympics – Men's team rosters.

== Preliminary round ==
The top two teams from each group advance to the semifinals, while the remaining teams compete for 5th through 16th places in separate brackets.

=== Group A ===
Pos	Team	Pld	W	L	PF	PA	PD	Pts	Qualification
1	United States	7	7	0	542	312	+230	14	Semifinals
2	Cuba	7	6	1	560	445	+115	13	Semifinals
3	Brazil	7	4	3	561	490	+71	11 (Note: Head-to-head record: Brazil 1–0 Czechoslovakia)	5th–8th classification round
4	Czechoslovakia	7	4	3	493	489	+4	11	5th–8th classification round
5	Spain	7	3	4	486	500	−14	10 (Note: Head-to-head record: Spain 1–0 Australia)	9th–12th classification round
6	Australia	7	3	4	523	524	−1	10	9th–12th classification round
7	Japan	7	1	6	442	643	−201	8	13th–16th classification round
8	Egypt	7	0	7	440	644	−204	7	13th–16th classification round

Source: FIBA archive
Rules for classification: 1) points; 2) head-to-head points; 3) head-to-head goal average; 4) head-to-head number of points scored.
Notes:

27 August
10:30

Cuba	105–64	Egypt

Rudi-Sedlmayer-Halle, Munich

27 August
12:00

United States	66–35	Czechoslovakia

Rudi-Sedlmayer-Halle, Munich

27 August
14:30

Japan	55–110	Brazil

Rudi-Sedlmayer-Halle, Munich

27 August
20:00

Spain	79–74	Australia

Rudi-Sedlmayer-Halle, Munich

28 August
9:00

Brazil	110–84	Egypt

Rudi-Sedlmayer-Halle, Munich

28 August
14:30

United States	81–55	Australia

Rudi-Sedlmayer-Halle, Munich

28 August
16:00

Cuba	74–53	Spain

Rudi-Sedlmayer-Halle, Munich

28 August
20:00

Japan	61–74	Czechoslovakia

Rudi-Sedlmayer-Halle, Munich

29 August
9:00

Brazil	72–69	Spain

Rudi-Sedlmayer-Halle, Munich

29 August
14:30

Japan	78–73	Egypt

Rudi-Sedlmayer-Halle, Munich

29 August
20:00

Czechoslovakia	69–68	Australia

Rudi-Sedlmayer-Halle, Munich

29 August
21:30

United States	67–48	Cuba

Rudi-Sedlmayer-Halle, Munich

30 August
10:30

Egypt	58–72	Spain

Rudi-Sedlmayer-Halle, Munich

30 August
14:30

Japan	76–92	Australia

Rudi-Sedlmayer-Halle, Munich

30 August
16:00

Czechoslovakia	65–77	Cuba

Rudi-Sedlmayer-Halle, Munich

30 August
21:30

Brazil	54–61	United States

Rudi-Sedlmayer-Halle, Munich

1 September
21:30

Japan	76–87	Spain

Rudi-Sedlmayer-Halle, Munich

1 September
21:30

Australia	70–84	Cuba

Rudi-Sedlmayer-Halle, Munich

1 September
21:30

Egypt	31–96	United States

Rudi-Sedlmayer-Halle, Munich

1 September
21:30

Czechoslovakia	82–83	Brazil

Rudi-Sedlmayer-Halle, Munich

2 September
9:00

Australia	75–69	Brazil

Rudi-Sedlmayer-Halle, Munich

2 September
12:00

Egypt	64–94	Czechoslovakia

Rudi-Sedlmayer-Halle, Munich

2 September
14:30

Japan	63–108	Cuba

Rudi-Sedlmayer-Halle, Munich

2 September
18:30

Spain	56–72	United States

Rudi-Sedlmayer-Halle, Munich

3 September
9:00

Japan	33–99	United States

Rudi-Sedlmayer-Halle, Munich

3 September
10:30

Spain	70–74	Czechoslovakia

Rudi-Sedlmayer-Halle, Munich

3 September
18:30

Australia	89–66	Egypt

Rudi-Sedlmayer-Halle, Munich

3 September
21:30

Cuba	64–63	Brazil

Rudi-Sedlmayer-Halle, Munich

=== Group B ===
Pos	Team	Pld	W	L	PF	PA	PD	Pts	Qualification
1	Soviet Union	7	7	0	639	479	+160	14	Semifinals
2	Italy	7	5	2	547	471	+76	12 (Note: Head-to-head record: Italy 1–1 (1.072 GAvg), Yugoslavia 1–1 (1.013), Puerto Rico 1–1 (0.917))	Semifinals
3	Yugoslavia	7	5	2	582	484	+98	12	5th–8th classification round
4	Puerto Rico	7	5	2	570	531	+39	12	5th–8th classification round
5	West Germany (H)	7	3	4	482	518	−36	10	9th–12th classification round
6	Poland	7	2	5	520	536	−16	9	9th–12th classification round
7	Philippines	7	1	6	526	666	−140	8	13th–16th classification round
8	Senegal	7	0	7	405	586	−181	7	13th–16th classification round

Source: FIBA archive
Rules for classification: 1) points; 2) head-to-head points; 3) head-to-head goal average; 4) head-to-head number of points scored.
(H) Hosts
Notes:

27 August
9:00

Poland	90–75	Philippines

Rudi-Sedlmayer-Halle, Munich

27 August
16:00

Yugoslavia	85–78	Italy

Rudi-Sedlmayer-Halle, Munich

27 August
18:30

Senegal	52–94	Soviet Union

Rudi-Sedlmayer-Halle, Munich

27 August
21:30

West Germany	74–81	Puerto Rico

Rudi-Sedlmayer-Halle, Munich

28 August
12:00

West Germany	63–87	Soviet Union

Rudi-Sedlmayer-Halle, Munich

28 August
16:30

Senegal	56–92	Italy

Rudi-Sedlmayer-Halle, Munich

28 August
18:30

Puerto Rico	92–72	Philippines

Rudi-Sedlmayer-Halle, Munich

28 August
21:30

Poland	64–85	Yugoslavia

Rudi-Sedlmayer-Halle, Munich

29 August
10:30

Senegal	59–95	Poland

Rudi-Sedlmayer-Halle, Munich

29 August
12:00

Soviet Union	79–66	Italy

Rudi-Sedlmayer-Halle, Munich

29 August
16:00

Puerto Rico	79–74	Yugoslavia

Rudi-Sedlmayer-Halle, Munich

29 August
18:30

West Germany	93–74	Philippines

Rudi-Sedlmayer-Halle, Munich

30 August
9:00

Soviet Union	94–64	Poland

Rudi-Sedlmayer-Halle, Munich

30 August
12:00

West Germany	57–68	Italy

Rudi-Sedlmayer-Halle, Munich

30 August
18:30

Philippines	76–117	Yugoslavia

Rudi-Sedlmayer-Halle, Munich

30 August
20:00

Puerto Rico	92–57	Senegal

Rudi-Sedlmayer-Halle, Munich

1 September
9:00

Senegal	62–68	Philippines

Rudi-Sedlmayer-Halle, Munich

1 September
12:00

West Germany	56–81	Yugoslavia

Rudi-Sedlmayer-Halle, Munich

1 September
20:00

Italy	71–59	Poland

Rudi-Sedlmayer-Halle, Munich

1 September
21:30

Soviet Union	100–87	Puerto Rico

Rudi-Sedlmayer-Halle, Munich

2 September
12:00

Yugoslavia	73–57	Senegal

Rudi-Sedlmayer-Halle, Munich

2 September
14:30

West Germany	67–65	Poland

Rudi-Sedlmayer-Halle, Munich

2 September
16:00

Philippines	80–111	Soviet Union

Rudi-Sedlmayer-Halle, Munich

2 September
20:00

Italy	71–54	Puerto Rico

Rudi-Sedlmayer-Halle, Munich

3 September
12:00

Italy	101–81	Philippines

Rudi-Sedlmayer-Halle, Munich

3 September
14:30

Poland	83–85	Puerto Rico

Rudi-Sedlmayer-Halle, Munich

3 September
16:00

Yugoslavia	67–74	Soviet Union

Rudi-Sedlmayer-Halle, Munich

3 September
20:00

West Germany	72–62	Senegal

Rudi-Sedlmayer-Halle, Munich

== Knockout stage ==
=== Medal bracket ===
Semifinals (7 September)
A1	United States	68
B2	Italy	38
B1	Soviet Union	67
A2	Cuba	61

Gold medal (9 September)
A1	United States	50
B1	Soviet Union	51
Bronze medal (8 September)
B2	Italy	65
A2	Cuba	66

=== Classification brackets ===
5th–8th place

Semifinals (7 September)
A3	Brazil	83
B4	Puerto Rico	87
B3	Yugoslavia	66
A4	Czechoslovakia	63

5th place (9 September)
B4	Puerto Rico	70
B3	Yugoslavia	86
7th place (8 September)
A3	Brazil	87
A4	Czechoslovakia	69

9th–12th place

Semifinals (5 September)
A5	Spain	76
B6	Poland	87
B5	West Germany	69
A6	Australia	70

9th place (9 September)
B6	Poland	83
A6	Australia	91
11th place (8 September)
A5	Spain	84
B5	West Germany	83

13th–16th place

Semifinals (5 September)
A7	Japan	70
B8	Senegal	67
B7	Philippines	2
A8	Egypt	0^{[a]}

13th place (7 September)
A7	Japan	73
B7	Philippines	82
15th place
B8	Egypt	0^{[a]}
A8	Senegal	2

- ^{a} Forfeited match.

== Final ==
9 September
23:30

Soviet Union	51–50	United States
Scoring by half: 26–21, 25–29
Pts: Sergey Belov 20; Rebs: Alexander Belov 8		Pts: Tom Henderson, Jim Brewer 9 each Rebs: Mike Bantom 9

Rudi-Sedlmayer-Halle, Munich
Referees: Renato Righetto (Brazil), Artenik Arabadjian (Bulgaria)

== Awards ==
1972 Olympic Basketball Champions

Soviet Union
First title

== Final standings ==
Rank	Team	Pld	W	L
1st place, gold medalist(s)	Soviet Union	9	9	0
2nd place, silver medalist(s)	United States	9	8	1
3rd place, bronze medalist(s)	Cuba	9	7	2
4th	Italy	9	5	4
5th	Yugoslavia	9	7	2
6th	Puerto Rico	9	6	3
7th	Brazil	9	5	4
8th	Czechoslovakia	9	4	5
9th	Australia	9	5	4
10th	Poland	9	3	6
11th	Spain	9	4	5
12th	West Germany	9	3	6
13th	Philippines	9	3	6
14th	Japan	9	2	7
15th	Senegal	9	1	8
16th	Egypt	9	0	9
