= Samuell =

Samuell may refer to:

- W. W. Samuell High School, public secondary school in Dallas, Texas, USA
- Orlando Samuell (born 1946), Cuban volleyball player and coach
- Paul Samuell (1886–1938), American jurist
- Yann Samuell (born 1965), French film director, and screenwriter
- Samuell Williamson (born 2000), American basketball player

== See also ==
- Samuel
