= Peter Byrne =

Peter Byrne may refer to:

- Peter Byrne (actor) (1928–2018), English actor and director
- Peter Byrne (basketball) (born 1948), Australian Olympic basketball player
- Peter Byrne (philosopher), author and lecturer on philosophy
- Peter Byrne (politician) (1892–1974), member of the Queensland Legislative Assembly
- Peter Byrne (sailor) (1936–2017), Canadian Olympic sailor
- Peter Byrne (sportswriter) (1935–2022), Irish sportswriter
- Peter Byrne (weather presenter), Australian television presenter and former meteorologist
- Peter John Byrne (born 1951), American prelate of the Catholic Church
- Pete Byrne (1952–2026), English singer
- Peter C. Byrne (1925–2023), Irish-American explorer, media personality, cryptozoologist, and author

== See also ==
- Peter Burns (disambiguation)
