= Liga Superior de Baloncesto =

Liga Superior de Baloncesto may refer to:

- Liga Superior de Baloncesto (Cuba)
- Liga Superior de Baloncesto de El Salvador
- Liga Superior de Baloncesto (Nicaragua)
