= Silvestras =

Sigitas
- Gender: Male
- Language: Lithuanian
- Name day: 26 November

Origin
- Region of origin: Lithuania

Other names
- Related names: Sylvester, Sylvestre,

Silvestras is a Lithuanian masculine given name. It is a cognate of the English language given name Sylvester and the French language given name Sylvestre. Notable people with the name include:

- Silvestras Guogis (born 1990), Lithuanian hurdler and sprinter
- Silvestras Leonas (1894–1959), Lithuanian military officer, judge, politician
- Silvestras Žukauskas (1860–1937), Lithuanian military general
- Silvestras Beltė (born 1997), Lithuanian singer
