= Sugita =

Sugita (written: 杉田) is a Japanese surname. Notable people with the surname include:

- Sugita Genpaku (1733–1817), Japanese scholar who was known for his translation of Kaitai Shinsho (New Book of Anatomy)
- Hina Sugita (杉田 妃和; born 1997), Japanese women's footballer
- Hisajo Sugita (杉田 久女; 1890–1946), Japanese poet
- Kaoru Sugita (born 1964), Japanese actress, singer, and celebrity
- Katsuhiko Sugita (杉田 勝彦; born 1946), Japanese basketball player
- Kazuhiro Sugita (杉田 和博; 1941–2025), Japanese police officer
- Koshiro Sugita (杉田 好志郎), Japanese Paralympic swimmer
- Mio Sugita (born 1967), Japanese politician
- Motoshi Sugita (born 1951), Japanese politician of the Liberal Democratic Party
- Shigeru Sugita (杉田 茂, 1946 or 1947–2025), Japanese bodybuilder
- Takeshi Sugita (杉田 武; born 1947), Japanese sport shooter
- Tomokazu Sugita (born 1980), Japanese voice actor
- Yūichi Sugita (born 1988), Japanese tennis player
- Yukiya Sugita (born 1993), Japanese footballer

== See also ==
- Sugita Station (Kanagawa), located in Isogo Ward, Yokohama, Japan
- Shin-Sugita Station, located in Isogo Ward, Yokohama, Japan
- Project Sugita Genpaku, project that aims to translate free content texts into Japanese
