= Leonas de Ponce squads =

This article shows past squads from the Puerto Rican professional volleyball team Leonas de Ponce from the Liga de Voleibol Superior Femenino.

== 2010 ==
As of February 2010

- Head Coach: (Puerto Rico) Rafael Olzagasti
- Assistant coach: (Puerto Rico) José Mieles

Number	Player	Position
1	(United States) Nellie Spencer	Setter
2	(Puerto Rico) Willyaris Flores	Libero
3	(Puerto Rico) Lorein Martínez	Middle Blocker
5	(Puerto Rico) Leichelie Guzmán	Wing Spiker
6	(Colombia) Lisette Watts	Middle Blocker
7	(Puerto Rico) Gloriana García	Middle Blocker
8	(Puerto Rico) Lorraine Avilés	Opposite
9	(Puerto Rico) Stephanie De la Mata	Setter
10	(Puerto Rico) Angélica Padilla	Middle Blocker
11	(Puerto Rico) Jeannette Santiago	Setter
12	(United States) Sarah Ammerman	Wing Spiker
15	(Puerto Rico) Keyla Vázquez	Wing Spiker
16	(United States) Sonja Newcombe	Wing Spiker
17	(Puerto Rico) Ana Rosa Luna	Middle Blocker

== 2009 ==
As of February 2009

- Head Coach: (Puerto Rico) Héctor Rentas
- Assistant coach: (Puerto Rico) Francisco Negrón

- Assistant coach: (Puerto Rico) Ricardo Rivera

Number	Player	Position
1	(Puerto Rico) Tatiana Jusino	Libero/ Wing Spiker
3	(United States) Belita Salters	Middle Blocker
4	(Puerto Rico) Roselly Pérez	Setter
5	(Puerto Rico) Leichelie Guzmán	Wing Spiker
6	(Puerto Rico) Lisette Watts	Middle Blocker
7	(Puerto Rico) Ana Rosa Luna	Middle Blocker
8	(Puerto Rico) Lorraine Avilés	Opposite
9	(United States) Kara Uhl	Wing Spiker
11	(Puerto Rico) Siamar Santiago	Setter
12	(Puerto Rico) Shenyse Torres	Libero
15	(Puerto Rico) Keyla Vásquez	Wing Spiker

=== Release or Transfer ===
Number	Player	Position
10	(United States) Karen Lawrence	Wing Spiker
12	(Puerto Rico) Joyce Rivera	Libero

== 2008 ==
As of April 2006

- Head Coach: (Puerto Rico) Héctor Rentas

Number	Player	Position
2	(United States) Patrice Arrington	Wing Spiker
3	(Puerto Rico) Tejaira Ruiz	Wing Spiker
4	(Puerto Rico) Roselly Pérez	Setter
5	(Puerto Rico) Leichelie Guzmán	Wing Spiker
6	(Puerto Rico) Lisette Watts	Middle Blocker
7	(Puerto Rico) Ana Rosa Luna	Middle Blocker
8	(Puerto Rico) Annjellyn Arroyo	Middle Blocker
9	(Puerto Rico) Karmarie Vélez	Setter
10	(United States) Leslie Finn	Wing Spiker
11	(Puerto Rico) Siamar Santiago	Setter
12	(Puerto Rico) Joyce Rivera	Libero
13	(Puerto Rico) Carmen Díaz	Libero/ Wing Spiker

== 2007 ==
As of April 2007

- Head Coach: (Puerto Rico) Héctor Rentas

Number	Player	Position
1	(Puerto Rico) Tatiana Jusino	Wing Spiker/Libero
2	(Puerto Rico) Ana Ramírez	Middle Blocker/ Opposite
3	(United States) Jamie DeKiewiet	Wing Spiker
4	(Puerto Rico) Roselly Pérez	Setter
5	(Puerto Rico) Leichelie Guzmán	Wing Spiker
6	(Puerto Rico) Lisette Watts	Middle Blocker
7	(Puerto Rico) Ana Rosa Luna	Middle Blocker
8	(Puerto Rico) Annjellyn Arroyo	Middle Blocker
10	(United States) Kelly Wing	Wing Spiker
11	(Puerto Rico) Deanna Rodríguez	Setter
12	(Puerto Rico) Joyce Rivera	Libero
13	(Puerto Rico) Karla Laviera	Libero

=== Release or Transfer ===
Number	Player	Position
5	(Puerto Rico) Sarai Álvarez	Opposite
9	(Puerto Rico) Sayra López	Wing Spiker
13	(Puerto Rico) Michelle Maltes	Middle Blocker

== 2006 ==
As of April 2006

- Head Coach: (Puerto Rico) Rafael Olazagasti
- Assistant coach: (Puerto Rico) Enrique López

- Assistant coach: (Puerto Rico) Francisco Negrón

Number	Player	Position
1	(Puerto Rico) Tatiana Jusino	Wing Spiker/ Libero
3	(Puerto Rico) Tamara Pagan	Opposite
4	(Puerto Rico) Roselly Pérez	Setter
5	(Puerto Rico) Saraí Álvarez	Opposite
6	(Puerto Rico) Lisette Watts	Middle Blocker
8	(Dominican Republic) Evelyn Carrera	Libero
10	(Dominican Republic) Milagros Cabral	Wing Spiker
11	(Puerto Rico) Liany Hidalgo	Middle Blocker
12	(Puerto Rico) Joyce Rivera	Libero
12	(Puerto Rico) Michelle Maltes	Middle Blocker
14	(United States) April Ross	Wing Spiker

=== Release or Transfer ===
Number	Player	Position
2	(Puerto Rico) Lymaris González	Setter

== 2005 ==
As of March 2005

- Head Coach: (Cuba) Jorge Pérez Vento

Number	Player	Position
1	(Puerto Rico) Carol Rodríguez	Opposite
3	(Puerto Rico) Yarelis Rodríguez	Middle Blocker
4	(Puerto Rico) Roselly Pérez	Setter
5	(Puerto Rico) Sarai Álvarez	Opposite
6	(Puerto Rico) Joyce Rivera	Libero
7	(Puerto Rico) Alba Aponte	Setter
8	(Dominican Republic) Evelyn Carrera	Libero
9	(Puerto Rico) Sayra López	Wing Spiker
10	(Puerto Rico) Tatiana Jusino	Wing Spiker
11	(Puerto Rico) Lisette Watts	Middle Blocker
14	(United States) April Ross	Wing Spiker
17	(Puerto Rico) Ana Rosa Luna	Middle Blocker

=== Release or Transfer ===
Number	Player	Position
2	(Puerto Rico) Odemaris Díaz	Middle Blocker
3	(Puerto Rico) Michelle Sánchez	Wing Spiker

== 2004 ==
As of March 2004

- Head Coach: (Cuba) Jorge Pérez Vento

Number	Player	Position
3	(Puerto Rico) Michelle Sánchez	Wing Spiker
4	(Puerto Rico) Nelly Rivera	Setter
5	(Puerto Rico) Ana Rosa Luna	Middle Blocker
6	(Puerto Rico) Michelle Cardona	Setter
8	(Dominican Republic) Evelyn Carreras	Wing Spiker
9	(Puerto Rico) Sayra López	Wing Spiker
10	(Puerto Rico) Keyla Vázquez	Wing Spiker
11	(Puerto Rico) Sarai Álvarez	Opposite
13	(United States) April Ross	Wing Spiker
14	(Puerto Rico) Grekchy Meléndez	Libero
18	(United States) Katie Olsovsky	Middle Blocker

=== Release or Transfer ===
Number	Player	Position
2	(Puerto Rico) Karmarie Vélez	Setter
7	(Puerto Rico) Alba Aponte	Middle Blocker

== 2003 ==
As of March 2003

- Head Coach: (Cuba) Jorge Pérez Vento
- Assistant coach: (Puerto Rico) Henry Collazo

- Assistant coach: (Puerto Rico) Steven Fenosik

Number	Player	Position
1	(Puerto Rico) Bibiana Rivera	Wing Spiker
2	(Puerto Rico) Suanette Morales	Wing Spiker
6	(Puerto Rico) Michelle Cardona	Setter
7	(Puerto Rico) Alba Aponte	Middle Blocker
8	(Puerto Rico) Yaricel Rodríguez	Middle Blocker
9	(Puerto Rico) Sayra López	Wing Spiker
11	(Puerto Rico) Sarai Álvarez	Opposite
12	(Puerto Rico) Karmarie Vélez	Setter
14	(Puerto Rico) Grekchy Meléndez	Libero
18	(United States) Sherisa Livingston	Middle Blocker

=== Release or Transfer ===
Number	Player	Position
3	(Puerto Rico) Michelle Sánchez	Wing Spiker
8	(Puerto Rico) Paola Rodríguez	Setter
16	(Puerto Rico) Mariler Mejías	Middle Blocker

== 2002 ==
As of February 2002

- Head Coach: (Puerto Rico) Kenneth Martínez
- Assistant coach: (Puerto Rico) Marcos Torres

- Assistant coach: (Puerto Rico) José Berríos

Number	Player	Position
1	(Puerto Rico) Deborah Seilhamer	Wing Spiker
2	(Mexico) Selena Barajas	Middle Blocker
3	(Puerto Rico) Michelle Sánchez	Wing Spiker
4	(Puerto Rico) Alicia Reyes	Setter
5	(Puerto Rico) Alexandra Ruiz	Wing Spiker
7	(Mexico) Bibiana Candelas	Middle Blocker
11	(Puerto Rico) Sarai Álvarez	Opposite
12	(Puerto Rico) Stephanie Rivera	Wing Spiker
13	(Puerto Rico) Michelle Maltes	Middle Blocker
14	(Puerto Rico) Grekchy Meléndez	Libero
