= BMW Park =

Indoor arena located in Sendling-Westpark, Munich, Germany

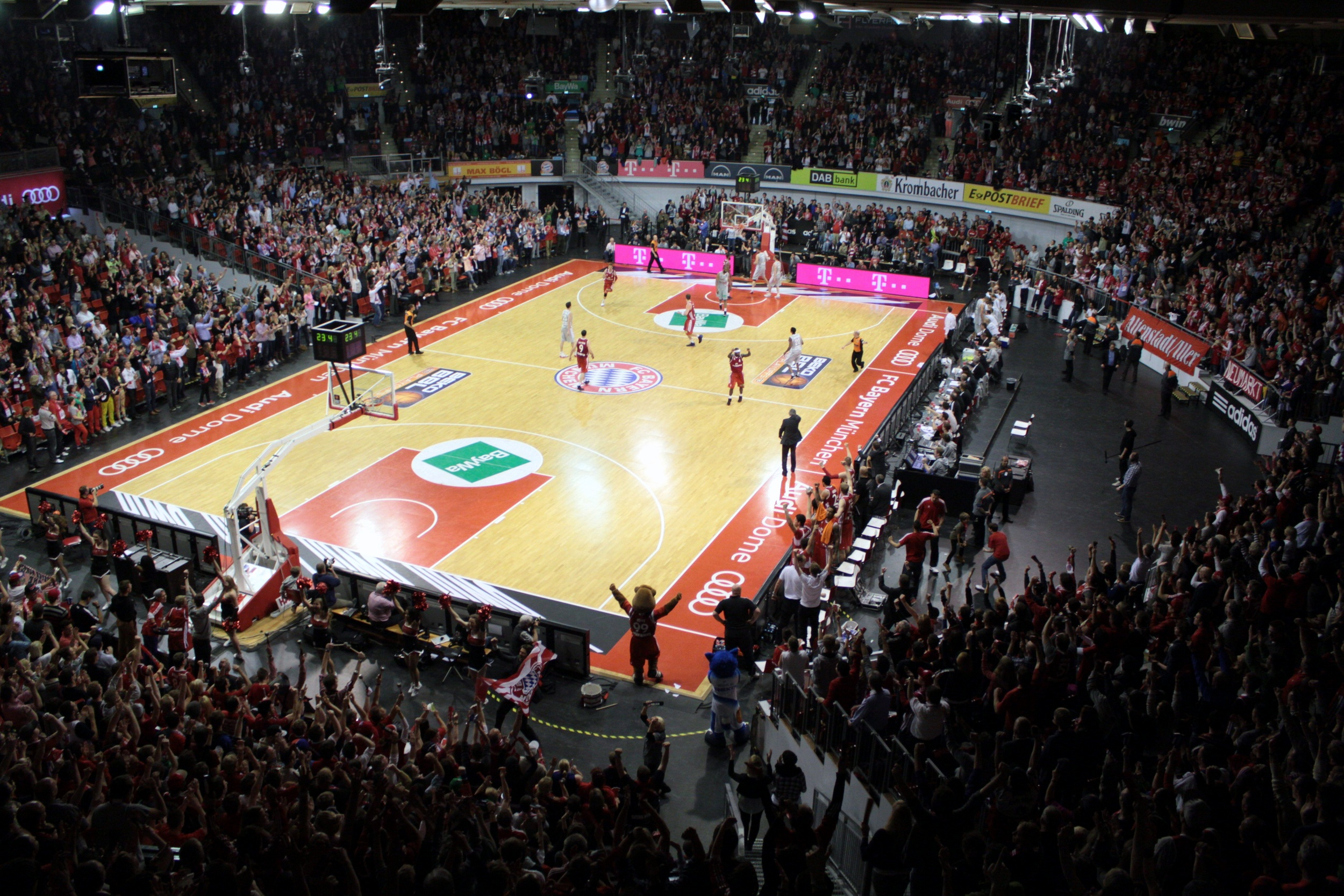
- BMW Park interior
- Interactive map of BMW Park
- Former names: Olympische Basketballhalle (1972–1974); Rudi-Sedlmayer-Halle (1974–2011); Audi Dome (2011–2023)
- Address: Grasweg 74
- Location: Munich, Germany
- Coordinates: 48°7′34″N 11°31′32″E
- Capacity: 6,500 (basketball); 7,200 (maximum capacity for sports)
- Surface: 2,516 m^{2}

Construction
- Opened: 1972, 2011
- Renovated: 2011
- Closed: 2003, 2009
- Architect: Georg Flinkerbush

Tenant
- Bayern Munich (BBL) (2011–present)

Website
- Official Site (in German)

BMW Park, formerly known as the Audi Dome, is an indoor arena in Munich, Germany. It was initially named and is still colloquially known as Rudi-Sedlmayer-Halle after the then-president of the Bavarian State Sport Association Rudolf Sedlmayer. With a capacity of 7,200, the arena opened in 1972 to host basketball events for the 1972 Summer Olympics and has served as the home of FC Bayern Munich's men's basketball club since 2011. It also served as a set for the 1975 movie Rollerball and as the venue of the 1983 Eurovision Song Contest.

== Location ==
The arena is situated in the southwest of Munich in the Sendling-Westpark district, at the connection between autobahn A96 and the city's internal belt road, Mittlerer Ring. North-east of the arena, a small garden is located. To the west and south-west, sports complexes can be found. The "Westpark", one of Munich's major parks, is located south-east of the arena. The arena can be reached by car over the main highway B2R, exit Grüntenstraße. By public transport, the arena can be reached by subway lines U4/U5 at the stop Heimeranplatz and by bus line 133 at the stop Siegenburger Straße.

== History ==
The arena was designed by the architect Georg Flinkerbush, the complex also includes a restaurant and a warm-up hall. Shortly after its completion, the arena served as the basketball venue for the 1972 Summer Olympics. In 1975, the arena served as one of the locations for the film Rollerball. It also hosted the 1978 FIBA European Champions Cup final in which Real Madrid defeated Mobilgirgi Varese 75-67.

On 23 April 1983, the arena played host to the 1983 Eurovision Song Contest.

On 5 May 2001, Irish vocal pop band Westlife held a concert for their Where Dreams Come True Tour supporting their album Coast to Coast. On 1 February 2003, the arena was closed for unknown reasons. It reopened in 2007 under new operator MPP Entertainment. Following the reopening, both the Baskets Munich and the basketball team of Bayern Munich expressed interest in a tenancy. On 8 January 2009, it became known that the firm operating the hall had registered for insolvency. In 2011, after renovations to the arena were completed, the newly promoted Bayern Munich basketball team moved into the arena, rebranding it as the Audi Dome. Since 2023, its naming rights have been allocated to car manufacturer BMW which is headquartered in Munich.

== See also ==
- List of indoor arenas in Germany

Preceded by Pionir Hall; Belgrade	FIBA European Champions Cup; Final Venue; 1978	Succeeded by Palais des Sports; Grenoble
Preceded by Harrogate International Centre; Harrogate	Eurovision Song Contest; Venue; 1983	Succeeded by Théâtre Municipal; Luxembourg City
