= Jorge Pérez Vento =

Cuban volleyball player (born 1947)

Personal information
- Full name: Jorge Pérez Vento Machado
- Nationality: Cuban
- Born: 28 September 1947 (age 79)
- Height: 1.82 m (6 ft 0 in)

Volleyball information
- Position: Setter
- Number: 12

National team
1966–1976	Cuba
Honours
Men's volleyball
Representing Cuba
Olympic Games
Bronze medal – third place	1976 Montreal	Team
Pan American Games
Gold medal – first place	1971 Cali	Team
Gold medal – first place	1975 Mexico City	Team
Bronze medal – third place	1967 Winnipeg	Team
Central American and Caribbean Games
Gold medal – first place	1966 San Juan	Team
Gold medal – first place	1970 Panama City	Team
Gold medal – first place	1974 Santo Domingo	Team

Jorge Pérez Vento (born 28 September 1947) is a Cuban former volleyball player who competed in the 1972 Summer Olympics in Munich and the 1976 Summer Olympics in Montreal.

In 1972, Vento was part of the Cuban team that finished tenth in the Olympic tournament. He played all six matches. Four years later, he won the bronze medal with the Cuban team in the 1976 Olympic tournament. He played all six matches again.
