= Orlando Samuell =

Cuban volleyball player

Orlando Samuels

Personal information
- Full name: Orlando Glastón Samuels Blackwood
- Born: 31 December 1946 (age 79); Esmeralda, Cuba
- Height: 1.78 m (5 ft 10 in)

Volleyball information
- Number: 12

National team
1966–1975	Cuba
Honours
Men's volleyball
Representing Cuba
Pan American Games
Gold medal – first place	1971 Cali	Team
Gold medal – first place	1975 Mexico City	Team
Bronze medal – third place	1967 Winnipeg	Team
Central American and Caribbean Games
Gold medal – first place	1966 San Juan	Team
Gold medal – first place	1970 Panama City	Team
Gold medal – first place	1974 Santo Domingo	Team

Orlando Samuels (born 31 December 1946), also known as Orlando Samuell, is a Cuban former volleyball player and coach. He competed in the men's tournament at the 1972 Summer Olympics in Munich. As well as competing at the Olympics, he won medals with the Cuban team at the Pan American Games, including a bronze medal in 1967, and gold medals in 1971 and 1975. He was the captain of the Cuban team in the early 1970s.

== Coaching ==
Samuels was the head coach of the Cuban men's team from 1989 to 1994, and again from 2007 to 2013. He coached the Cuban team at the 1992 Summer Olympics, finishing in fourth place. He also coached the Cuban team at the 2011 FIVB World Cup.
