= Carlos Dilaut =

Cuban volleyball player

Personal information
- Full name: Carlos Dilaut Reitor
- Born: 21 December 1948 (age 77); Jiguaní, Granma Province, Cuba
- Height: 1.89 m (6 ft 2 in)

Volleyball information
- Number: 2

National team
1970–1974	Cuba
Honours
Men's volleyball
Representing Cuba
Pan American Games
Gold medal – first place	1971 Cali	Team
Central American and Caribbean Games
Gold medal – first place	1970 Panama City	Team
Gold medal – first place	1974 Santo Domingo	Team

Carlos Dilaut (born 21 October 1948) is a retired Cuban volleyball player. He competed in the men's tournament at the 1972 Summer Olympics in Munich, West Germany. He won a gold medal with the Cuban team at the 1971 Pan American Games in Cali, Colombia.
