= Peter Burns =

Peter Burns may refer to:

- Peter Burns (architect) (1924–2020), Australian architect and artist
- Peter Burns (baseball) (active 1890–1900), Negro leagues catcher
- Peter Burns (footballer, born 1866) (1866–1952), Australian rules footballer for Geelong
- Peter Burns (footballer, born 1939) (1939–2009), Australian rules footballer for St Kilda
- Pete Burns (1959–2016), English singer-songwriter and television personality

== See also ==
- Peter Byrne (disambiguation)
