= Basketball at the Friendship Games =

Basketball at the Friendship Games was contested between 22 and 30 August 1984. Two events (one men's, with eleven teams and one women's, with eight teams) took place at two venues in Moscow, Soviet Union – the CSKA Sports Palace and the Dynamo Sports Palace.

== Men's event ==
Eleven teams were drawn into two groups.

=== Group A ===
Team	W	L	PF	PA	PD	Pts
Soviet Union	5	0	646	347	+229	10
Cuba	4	1	491	398	+93	9
Bulgaria	3	2	426	404	+22	8
Hungary	2	3	393	432	-39	7
Finland	1	4	388	421	-33	6
Colombia	0	5	229	571	-342	5

==== Results ====
Results	(Soviet Union)	(Cuba)	(Bulgaria)	(Hungary)	(Finland)	(Colombia)
Soviet Union		123:90	136:82	115:64	129:70	143:41
Cuba	90:123		85:77	97:75	93:76	126:47
Bulgaria	82:136	77:85		97:71	73:71	97:41
Hungary	64:115	75:97	71:97		76:73	107:50
Finland	70:129	76:93	71:73	73:76		98:50
Colombia	41:143	47:126	41:97	50:107	50:98	

=== Group B ===
Team	W	L	PF	PA	PD	Pts
Czechoslovakia	4	0	381	228	+153	8
Poland	3	1	381	272	+109	7
Sweden	2	2	393	272	+121	6
Algeria	1	3	227	369	-142	5
Morocco	0	4	188	429	-241	4

==== Results ====
Results	(Czechoslovakia)	(Poland)	(Sweden)	(Algeria)	(Morocco)
Czechoslovakia		87:75	82:72	100:45	112:36
Poland	75:87		102:88	85:55	119:42
Sweden	72:82	88:102		114:48	119:40
Algeria	45:100	55:85	48:114		79:70
Morocco	36:112	42:119	40:119	70:79	

=== Final round ===
Semifinals
A1	Soviet Union	139
B2	Poland	81
B1	Czechoslovakia	110
A2	Cuba	79

Final
Soviet Union	105
Czechoslovakia	70
Third place
Poland	91
Cuba	93

=== Classification round ===
==== Classification 5th–8th ====
5th-8th place
A3	Bulgaria	101
B4	Algeria	85
B3	Sweden	71
A4	Hungary	72

5th place match
Bulgaria	76
Hungary	68
7th place match
Algeria	48
Sweden	90

==== Classification 9th–12th ====
Because of the odd number of teams, 5th team of Group A (i. e. Finland) was seeded in the ninth place match without playing any second round match.

9th-11th place			9th place match
			A5	Finland	78
A6	Colombia	90	-	Colombia	59
B5	Morocco	82

=== Final ranking ===
Gold medal	Soviet Union
Silver medal	Czechoslovakia
Bronze medal	Cuba
4	Poland
5	Bulgaria
6	Hungary
7	Sweden
8	Algeria
9	Finland
10	Colombia
11	Morocco

== Women's event ==
Eight teams competed in a round-robin tournament.

	Team	W	L	PF	PA	PD	Pts
Gold medal	Soviet Union	7	0	687	398	+239	14
Silver medal	Bulgaria	5	2	574	531	+43	12
Bronze medal	Cuba	5	2	558	536	+22	12
4	Poland	3	4	440	499	-59	10
5	Czechoslovakia	3	4	519	512	+7	10
6	Hungary	3	4	529	528	+1	10
7	North Korea	1	6	522	691	-169	8
8	Finland	1	6	441	575	-134	8

=== Results ===
Results	(Soviet Union)	(Bulgaria)	(Cuba)	(Poland)	(Czechoslovakia)	(Hungary)	(North Korea)	(Finland)
Soviet Union		99:56	102:75	81:24	84:72	91:62	135:60	95:49
Bulgaria	56:99		86:73	77:67	97:65	69:82	110:83	79:62
Cuba	75:102	73:86		69:68	69:64	82:73	98:68	92:75
Poland	24:81	67:77	68:69		63:62	77:75	81:73	60:62
Czechoslovakia	72:84	65:97	64:69	62:63		67:52	101:89	88:58
Hungary	62:91	82:69	73:82	75:77	52:67		96:77	89:65
North Korea	60:135	83:110	68:98	73:81	89:101	77:96		72:70
Finland	49:95	62:79	75:92	62:60	58:88	65:89	70:72	

== Winning teams' squads ==
Event	Gold	Silver	Bronze
Men's	Soviet Union Alexander Belostenny; Valdemaras Chomičius; Sergejus Jovaiša; Stanislav Yeryomin; Rimas Kurtinaitis; Andrei Lopatov; Anatoli Myshkin; Arvydas Sabonis; Sergei Tarakanov; Valery Tikhonenko; Vladimir Tkachenko; Valdis Valters	Czechoslovakia Zdeněk Böhm; Kamil Brabenec; Gerald Dietl; Vlastimil Havlík; Ľudovít Kristiník; Stanislav Kropilák; Oto Matický; Jiří Okáč; Peter Rajniak; Jaroslav Skála; Igor Vraniak; Juraj Žuffa	Cuba Pascal Abreo; Calsado Bise; Rosel Cabrera; Matenso Campos; Raul Dubois; Brais Daniel Esco; Martines Herrera; Indigas Laferte; Alberto Maturel; Alfonso Morales; Almentere Perez; Salomon Simon
Women's	Soviet Union Olesya Barel; Tatiana Belochapko; Olga Buyakina; Yelena Chausova; Olga Yakovleva; Larisa Kuriksha; Liudmila Muravyeva; Nadezhda Olkhova; Galina Savitskaya; Uljana Semjonova; Olga Sukharnova; Ramunė Šidlauskaitė	Bulgaria Lubka Alipyeieva; Krassimira Banova; Vania Dermendjieva; Radostina Dimitrova; Nadka Goltcheva; Mariana Ivanova; Nenka Ivanova; Petkana Makaveeva; Evladia Slavtcheva-Stefanova; Madlena Staneva; Nina Todorova; Radmila Vasilyeva	Cuba Hernandes Albares; Vilinueva Arias; Rivero Beccer; Hernandes Borrell; Dias Cala; Cinmana Cos; Maria Leon Molinet; Hernandes More; Munjagon Osoria; Cinbones Scite

== Medal table ==
* Host nation (Soviet Union)

Rank	Nation	Gold	Silver	Bronze	Total
1	Soviet Union (URS)*	2	0	0	2
2	Bulgaria (BUL)	0	1	0	1
2	Czechoslovakia (TCH)	0	1	0	1
4	Cuba (CUB)	0	0	2	2
Totals (4 entries)		2	2	2	6

== See also ==
- Basketball at the 1984 Summer Olympics
