= 1974 FIBA World Championship =

1974 edition of the FIBA World Championship

FIBA Campeonato Mundial de Baloncesto de 1974

Tournament details
- Host country: Puerto Rico
- Dates: July 3–14
- Officially opened by: Rafael Hernández Colón
- Teams: 14 (from 5 confederations)
- Venue(s): 3 (in 3 host cities)

Final positions
- Champions: Soviet Union (2nd title)
- Runners-up: Yugoslavia
- Third place: United States
- Fourth place: Cuba

Tournament statistics
- Games played: 55
- MVP: (Socialist Federal Republic of Yugoslavia) Dragan Kićanović
- Top scorer: (Mexico) Arturo Guerrero (27.0 points per game)

The 1974 FIBA World Championship was the 7th FIBA World Championship, the international basketball world championship for men's national teams. It was hosted by Puerto Rico from July 3 to 14, 1974. The tournament was won by the Soviet Union.

== Venues ==
Ponce	Caguas	San Juan
Auditorio Pachín Vicéns	Coliseo Héctor Solá Bezares	Roberto Clemente Coliseum
Capacity: 8,000	Capacity: 10,000	Capacity: 12,000

== Competing nations ==
Group A	Group B	Group C	Final round
Brazil; Central African Republic; Mexico; Soviet Union	Argentina; Philippines; Spain; United States	Australia; Canada; Cuba; Czechoslovakia	Puerto Rico – host Yugoslavia – defending champion

== Preliminary round ==
=== Group A ===
Pos	Team	Pld	W	L	PF	PA	PD	Pts	Qualification
1	Soviet Union	3	3	0	314	188	+126	6	Final round
2	Brazil	3	2	1	254	211	+43	5	Final round
3	Mexico	3	1	2	264	277	−13	4	Classification round
4	Central African Republic	3	0	3	184	340	−156	3	Classification round

Source: FIBA Archive
Rules for classification: 1) points; 2) head-to-head points; 3) head-to-head goal average; 4) head-to-head number of points scored.

July 3

Soviet Union	140–48	Central African Republic
Scoring by half: 72-23, 68-25

Auditorio Pachín Vicéns, Ponce

July 3

Mexico	78–100	Brazil
Scoring by half: 27-46, 51-54

Auditorio Pachín Vicéns, Ponce

July 4

Mexico	106–82	Central African Republic
Scoring by half: 61-40, 45-42

Roberto Clemente Coliseum, San Juan

July 4

Brazil	60–79	Soviet Union
Scoring by half: 25-39, 35-40

Roberto Clemente Coliseum, San Juan

July 5

Brazil	94–54	Central African Republic
Scoring by half: 47-32, 47-22

Coliseo Héctor Solá Bezares, Caguas

July 5

Soviet Union	95–80	Mexico
Scoring by half: 46-41, 49-39

Coliseo Héctor Solá Bezares, Caguas

=== Group B ===
Pos	Team	Pld	W	L	PF	PA	PD	Pts	Qualification
1	United States	3	3	0	358	242	+116	6	Final round
2	Spain	3	2	1	284	288	−4	5	Final round
3	Argentina	3	1	2	286	295	−9	4	Classification round
4	Philippines	3	0	3	260	363	−103	3	Classification round

Source: FIBA Archive
Rules for classification: 1) points; 2) head-to-head points; 3) head-to-head goal average; 4) head-to-head number of points scored.

July 3
19:30

Philippines	85–135	United States
Scoring by half: 38−57, 47−78
Pts: Jaworski 21		Pts: Lucas 30

Roberto Clemente Coliseum, San Juan
Attendance: 5,000
Referees: Manny Reynoso (MEX), Obrad Belošević (YUG)

July 3

Spain	96–89	Argentina
Scoring by half: 44-47, 52-42

Roberto Clemente Coliseum, San Juan

July 4
19:30

Philippines	90–111	Argentina
Scoring by half: 48−59, 42−52
Pts: Adornado 23		Pts: Ghermann 27

Coliseo Héctor Solá Bezares, Caguas
Referees: Hugh Richardson (THA), Henri M'Bahia (CAF)

July 4

United States	114–71	Spain
Scoring by half: 54-35, 60-36

Coliseo Héctor Solá Bezares, Caguas

July 5
19:30

Spain	117–85	Philippines
Scoring by half: 59−41, 58−44
Pts: Brabender 37		Pts: Jaworski 23

Auditorio Pachín Vicéns, Ponce
Referees: Artenik Arabadjan (BUL), Isaac Grinman (BRA)

July 5

Argentina	86–109	United States
Scoring by half: 43-56, 43-53

Auditorio Pachín Vicéns, Ponce

=== Group C ===
Pos	Team	Pld	W	L	PF	PA	PD	Pts	Qualification
1	Cuba	3	3	0	233	218	+15	6	Final round
2	Canada	3	2	1	242	224	+18	5	Final round
3	Czechoslovakia	3	1	2	224	228	−4	4	Classification round
4	Australia	3	0	3	232	261	−29	3	Classification round

Source: FIBA Archive
Rules for classification: 1) points; 2) head-to-head points; 3) head-to-head goal average; 4) head-to-head number of points scored.

July 3

Australia	69–80	Canada
Scoring by half: 36-40, 33-40

Coliseo Héctor Solá Bezares, Caguas

July 3

Cuba	61–60	Czechoslovakia
Scoring by half: 26-30, 35-30

Coliseo Héctor Solá Bezares, Caguas

July 4

Cuba	92–79	Australia
Scoring by half: 48-44, 44-35

Auditorio Pachín Vicéns, Ponce

July 4

Czechoslovakia	75–83	Canada
Scoring by half: 42-40, 33-43

Auditorio Pachín Vicéns, Ponce

July 5

Czechoslovakia	89–84	Australia
Scoring by half: 46-38, 43-46

Roberto Clemente Coliseum, San Juan

July 5

Cuba	80–79	Canada
Scoring by half: 42-46, 38-33

Roberto Clemente Coliseum, San Juan

== Classification round ==
Pos	Team	Pld	W	L	PF	PA	PD	Pts
9	Mexico	5	5	0	482	428	+54	10
10	Czechoslovakia	5	4	1	518	451	+67	9
11	Argentina	5	2	3	517	471	+46	7 (Note: Head-to-head record: Argentina 1–1 (1.10 GAvg), Australia 1–1 (1.01 GAvg), Philippines 1–1 (0.91 GAvg))
12	Australia	5	2	3	466	442	+24	7
13	Philippines	5	2	3	474	517	−43	7
14	Central African Republic	5	0	5	375	523	−148	5

Source: FIBA Archive
Rules for classification: 1) points; 2) head-to-head points; 3) head-to-head goal average; 4) head-to-head number of points scored.
Notes:

July 7
14:00

Czechoslovakia	84–94	Mexico
Scoring by half: 44-49, 40-45

Coliseo Héctor Solá Bezares, Caguas

July 8
21:30

Philippines	101–100	Australia
Scoring by half: 50−50, 51−50
Pts: Adornado 20		Pts: Palubinskas 39

Coliseo Héctor Solá Bezares, Caguas
Referees: Mario Quintero (CUB), Carlos Bagué (ESP)

July 8

Central African Republic	70–121	Argentina
Scoring by half: 42-59, 28-62

Coliseo Héctor Solá Bezares, Caguas

July 9
21:30

Mexico	101–84	Philippines
Scoring by half: 44−42, 57−42
Pts: Raga 38		Pts: Adornado 17

Coliseo Héctor Solá Bezares, Caguas
Referees: David Davidian (USSR), José Baldrich (PUR)

July 9

Australia	102–100	Argentina
Scoring by half: 53-48, 49-52

Coliseo Héctor Solá Bezares, Caguas

July 9

Central African Republic	70–113	Czechoslovakia
Scoring by half: 32-65, 38-48

Coliseo Héctor Solá Bezares, Caguas

July 11

Australia	96–67	Central African Republic
Scoring by half: 45-21, 51-46

Coliseo Héctor Solá Bezares, Caguas

July 11
11:30

Philippines	112–119	Czechoslovakia
Scoring by half: 46−59, 66−60
Pts: Arnaiz 25		Pts: Brabenec 29

Coliseo Héctor Solá Bezares, Caguas
Referees: Isaac Grinman (BRA), Obrad Belošević (YUG)

July 11

Argentina	94–96	Mexico
Scoring by half: 46-56, 48-40

Coliseo Héctor Solá Bezares, Caguas

July 12

Mexico	85–84	Australia
Scoring by half: 45-48, 40-36

Coliseo Héctor Solá Bezares, Caguas

July 12

Argentina	91–113	Czechoslovakia
Scoring by half: 46-65, 45-48

Coliseo Héctor Solá Bezares, Caguas

July 12
21:30

Philippines	87–86	Central African Republic
Scoring by half: 41−49, 46−37
Pts: Adornado 22		Pts: Gambor 24

Coliseo Héctor Solá Bezares, Caguas
Referees: Ron Foxcroft (CAN), Manny Reynoso (MEX)

== Final round ==
Pos	Team	Pld	W	L	PF	PA	PD	Pts
1	Soviet Union (C)	7	6	1	625	509	+116	13 (Note: Head-to-head record: Soviet Union 1–1 (1.05 GAvg), Yugoslavia 1–1 (1.00 GAvg), United States 1–1 (0.96 GAvg))
2	Yugoslavia	7	6	1	629	568	+61	13
3	United States	7	6	1	694	587	+107	13
4	Cuba	7	3	4	565	599	−34	10
5	Spain	7	2	5	556	640	−84	9 (Note: Head-to-head record: Spain 2–0, Brazil 1–1, Puerto Rico 0–2)
6	Brazil	7	2	5	522	586	−64	9
7	Puerto Rico (H)	7	2	5	568	620	−52	9
8	Canada	7	1	6	566	616	−50	8

Source: FIBA Archive
Rules for classification: 1) points; 2) head-to-head points; 3) head-to-head goal average; 4) head-to-head number of points scored.
(C) Champions; (H) Hosts
Notes:

July 7

Spain	71–100	Soviet Union
Scoring by half: 37-45, 34-55

Roberto Clemente Coliseum, San Juan

July 7

Brazil	60–84	Yugoslavia
Scoring by half: 31-35, 29-49

Roberto Clemente Coliseum, San Juan

July 7

Puerto Rico	76–94	United States
Scoring by half: 22-52, 54-42

Roberto Clemente Coliseum, San Juan

July 8

Cuba	83–101	Yugoslavia
Scoring by half: 44-54, 39-47

Roberto Clemente Coliseum, San Juan

July 8

Canada	94–115	United States
Scoring by half: 37-55, 57-60

Roberto Clemente Coliseum, San Juan

July 8

Puerto Rico	86–102	Spain
Scoring by half: 43-50, 43-52

Roberto Clemente Coliseum, San Juan

July 9

Canada	86–73	Spain
Scoring by half: 52-41, 34-32

Roberto Clemente Coliseum, San Juan

July 9

Yugoslavia	82–79	Soviet Union
Scoring by half: 45-46, 37-33

Roberto Clemente Coliseum, San Juan

July 9

Cuba	70–83	United States
Scoring by half: 41-47, 29-36

Roberto Clemente Coliseum, San Juan

July 9

Brazil	73–68	Puerto Rico
Scoring by half: 34-33, 39-35

Roberto Clemente Coliseum, San Juan

July 11

Canada	74–75	Brazil
Scoring by half: 28-32, 46-43

Roberto Clemente Coliseum, San Juan

July 11

Cuba	66–83	Soviet Union
Scoring by half: 36-41, 30-42

Roberto Clemente Coliseum, San Juan

July 11

Yugoslavia	93–85	Puerto Rico
Scoring by half: 41-31, 52-54

Roberto Clemente Coliseum, San Juan

July 12

Yugoslavia	102–99 (OT)	Canada
Scoring by half: 53-39, 37-51 Overtime: 12-9

Roberto Clemente Coliseum, San Juan

July 12

Cuba	84–75	Spain
Scoring by half: 39-38, 45-37

Roberto Clemente Coliseum, San Juan

July 12

United States	103–83	Brazil
Scoring by half: 45-32, 58-51

Roberto Clemente Coliseum, San Juan

July 12

Soviet Union	87–76	Puerto Rico
Scoring by half: 44-39, 43-37

Roberto Clemente Coliseum, San Juan

July 13

Spain	93–91 (OT)	Brazil
Scoring by half: 44-37, 37-44 Overtime: 12-10

Roberto Clemente Coliseum, San Juan

July 13

United States	91–88	Yugoslavia
Scoring by half: 41-50, 50-38

Roberto Clemente Coliseum, San Juan

July 13

Soviet Union	92–60	Canada
Scoring by half: 47-29, 45-31

Roberto Clemente Coliseum, San Juan

July 13

Cuba	97–98	Puerto Rico
Scoring by half: 43-34, 54-64

Roberto Clemente Coliseum, San Juan

July 14

Spain	71–79	Yugoslavia
Scoring by half: 35-37, 36-42

Roberto Clemente Coliseum, San Juan

July 14

Soviet Union	105–94	United States
Scoring by half: 55-55, 50-39

Roberto Clemente Coliseum, San Juan

July 14

Cuba	85–80	Brazil
Scoring by half: 33-54, 52-26

Roberto Clemente Coliseum, San Juan

July 14

Puerto Rico	79–74	Canada
Scoring by half: 37-29, 42-45

Roberto Clemente Coliseum, San Juan

Each team played the other seven once. Since the Soviets, the Americans and the Yugoslavian team each finished with records of 6-1, the medals were "decided on the goal average in the three games among each other." In those three games (Yugoslavia 82, U.S.S.R. 79; U.S. 91, Yugoslavia 88; and USSR 105, U.S. 94), the USSR had outscored its opponents 184 to 176, Yugoslavia was even at 170 for and 170 against, and the U.S. had been outscored 185 to 193.

== Awards ==
1974 World Championship winner

Soviet Union
Second title

Most Valuable Player
(Socialist Federal Republic of Yugoslavia) Dragan Kićanović

== Final standings ==
Rank	Team	Record
1	Soviet Union	8–1
2	Yugoslavia	6–1
3	United States	8–1
4	Cuba	5–4
5	Spain	4–5
6	Brazil	4–5
7	Puerto Rico	2–5
8	Canada	3–6
9	Mexico	5–2
10	Czechoslovakia	4–3
11	Argentina	2–5
12	Australia	2–5
13	Philippines	2–5
14	Central African Republic	0–7

== All-Tournament Team ==
- (Soviet Union) Alexander Belov
- (Socialist Federal Republic of Yugoslavia) Vinko Jelovac
- (Spain) Wayne Brabender
- (Cuba) Alejandro Urgelles
- (Soviet Union) Alexander Salnikov

== Top scorers (ppg) ==
1. Arturo Guerrero (Mexico) 27.0
2. Manuel Raga (Mexico) 26.1
3. Eddie Palubinskas (Australia) 24.8
4. Wayne Brabender (Spain) 23.0
5. Ernesto Gehrmann (Argentina) 22.3
6. Luther Burden (United States) 20.2
7. John Lucas (United States) 20.2
8. Dragan Kićanović (Yugoslavia) 19.8
9. Alejandro Urgelles (Cuba) 19.3
10. William Adornado (Philippines) 18.0
