= Pedro Delgado (footballer, born 1977) =

Venezuelan footballer

Pedro Delgado was a Venezuelan footballer who ended his career with Carrick Rangers in Northern Ireland.

== Club career ==
He started his career as a central midfielder at Colegio San Ignacio de Loyola. He represented Venezuela at youth level - U-14, U-15 and U-17 including participation in the same South American Cup at which Ronaldo made his Brazil debut.

Following his stint as a player under a full athletic scholarship at the University of Evansville, where he was a 4 time student-athlete All America selection and named to the Missouri Valley Conference team of the century, he played for Deportivo Galicia and Deportivo Táchira Fútbol Club in his homeland. While playing for Deportivo Táchira Fútbol Club he made a few appearances in the Copa Libertadores.

In Northern Ireland, he played for Linfield FC, Dungannon Swifts FC, Carrick Rangers FC and for Larne.
