= Pedro Delgado (volleyball) =

Cuban volleyball player

Personal information
- Full name: Pedro Delgado González
- Nationality: Cuban
- Born: 5 December 1949 (age 76)
- Height: 1.78 m (5 ft 10 in)

Volleyball information
- Number: 6

National team
1970–1972	Cuba
Honours
Men's volleyball
Representing Cuba
Pan American Games
Gold medal – first place	1971 Cali	Team
Central American and Caribbean Games
Gold medal – first place	1970 Panama City	Team

Pedro Delgado (born 5 December 1949) is a retired Cuban volleyball player. He competed in the men's tournament at the 1972 Summer Olympics in Munich. He helped the Cuban team win the gold medal at the 1971 Pan American Games in Cali.
