= Ruperto Herrera Tabio =

Cuban basketball player (born 1949)

Ruperto Herrera
Personal information
- Born: December 6, 1949 (age 76) Havana, Cuba
- Listed height: 6 ft 6.75 in (2.00 m)
- Listed weight: 210 lb (95 kg)

Career information
- NBA draft: 1971: undrafted
- Position: Shooting guard / small forward
- Number: 5

Career history
- Capitalinos
- 1964–1982: Industriales
- Habana

Career highlights
- Olympic Order (2019); FIBA Order of Merit (1999); 9× Cuban League champion (1964–1969, 1971, 1973, 1975)
- FIBA Hall of Fame
Medals
Men's basketball
Representing Cuba
Summer Olympic Games
Bronze medal – third place	1972 Munich
Pan American Games
Bronze medal – third place	1971 Colombia
CentroBasket
Bronze medal – third place	1965 Mexico
Silver medal – second place	1967 El Salvador
Silver medal – second place	1969 Cuba
Gold medal – first place	1971 Venezuela
Bronze medal – third place	1975 Dominican Republic
Bronze medal – third place	1981 Puerto Rico
Summer Universiade
Bronze medal – third place	1970 Italy

Ruperto Nicolás Herrera Tabio (born December 6, 1949, in Havana) is a former basketball player from Cuba. At a height of 2.00 m (6'6 3/4") tall, and a weight of 95 kg (210 lbs.), he played at the shooting guard and small forward positions. He received the FIBA Order of Merit in 1999, and he became a FIBA Hall of Fame player, in 2015. He was awarded with the Olympic Order, in 2019.

== Club career ==
Herrera was a nine-time champion of the top-tier level Cuban league, in the years 1964, 1965, 1966, 1967, 1968, 1969, 1971, 1973, and 1975.

== National team career ==
Herrera was a long-time member of the senior men's Cuban national basketball team. With Cuba's senior national team, he played at four Summer Olympic Games, as he played at Mexico 1968, Munich 1972, Montreal 1976, and Moscow 1980. He also played at two FIBA World Cups, playing at Yugoslavia 1970, and Puerto Rico 1974.

With Cuba, he won the bronze medal at the 1971 Pan American Games. He also won the bronze medal at the 1972 Summer Olympic Games, which were held in Munich, West Germany.
