= Robert Andrew (field hockey) =

Australian hockey player

Personal information
- Nationality: Australian
- Born: 10 May 1942 (age 83)

Sport
- Sport: Field hockey

Robert Andrew (born 10 May 1942) is an Australian field hockey player. He competed in the men's tournament at the 1972 Summer Olympics.
