= Yudit Abreu =

Cuban basketball player

Yudit Abreu (born April 23, 1969) is a male basketball player from Cuba. He played as a forward for the Cuba national basketball team in the 1990s.
