= Hilario Hipólito =

Cuban fencer (born 1952)

Personal information
- Full name: Hilario Hipólito Veret
- Born: 14 January 1952 (age 74)

Sport
- Sport: Fencing
Medal record
Representing Cuba
Central American and Caribbean Games
Gold medal – first place	1978 Medellín	sabre

Hilario Hipólito Veret (born 14 January 1952) is a Cuban fencer. He competed in the team sabre event at the 1972 Summer Olympics.
