= Ronald Wilson (field hockey) =

Australian hockey player

Personal information
- Nationality: Australian
- Born: 17 October 1948 (age 77)

Sport
- Sport: Field hockey

Ronald Wilson (born 17 October 1948) is an Australian field hockey player. He competed in the men's tournament at the 1972 Summer Olympics.
