= Ken James (basketball) =

Australian basketball player

Personal information
- Full name: Kenneth Robert James
- Nationality: Australian
- Born: 19 January 1945 (age 81) Curwensville, Pennsylvania, U.S.
- Height: 190 cm (6 ft 3 in)
- Weight: 82 kg (181 lb)

Sport
- Sport: Basketball
- Position: Guard
- University team: Brigham Young University Cougars
- Team: Team Australia
Medal record
Representing Australia
Olympic Games

Kenneth Robert James (born 19 January 1945) is an Australian basketball player. He competed in the men's tournament at the 1972 Summer Olympics in Munich, West Germany.

== Brigham Young University ==
Ken James was a guard for the Brigham Young University men's basketball team 1964-1967. Where he scored 271 points in 47 games in his 3-year college playing career.

== 1972 Olympic Games ==
On offense, he scored an average of 10.0 points per game and had a total of 90 points. On defense, he averaged 2.3 turnovers per game and had a total of 21 turnovers for Team Australia, who came in ninth place.

== Personal life ==
Ken James is a member of the Church of Jesus Christ of Latter-day Saints.
