= Manuel Suárez (fencer) =

Cuban fencer

Personal information
- Born: 1 October 1950 (age 75)

Sport
- Sport: Fencing

Manuel Suárez (born 1 October 1950) is a Cuban fencer. He competed in the team sabre event at the 1972 Summer Olympics.
