= Terry McAskell =

Australian hockey player (born 1944)

Personal information
- Nationality: Australian
- Born: 9 January 1944 (age 82)

Sport
- Sport: Field hockey

Terry McAskell (born 9 January 1944) is an Australian field hockey player. He competed in the men's tournament at the 1972 Summer Olympics.
