= Talaat Guenidi =

Egyptian basketball player

Personal information
- Nationality: Egyptian
- Born: 26 November 1943 Cairo
- Died: February 2024 (aged 80)

Sport
- Sport: Basketball

Talaat Guenidi (26 November 1943 – February 2024) was an Egyptian basketball player. He competed in the men's tournament at the 1972 Summer Olympics.
