= Evelio González =

Cuban fencer

Personal information
- Born: 11 October 1952 (age 73)

Sport
- Sport: Fencing

Evelio González (born 11 October 1952) is a Cuban fencer. He competed in the team foil event at the 1972 Summer Olympics.
