= Hirofumi Numata =

Japanese basketball player

Personal information
- Nationality: Japanese
- Born: 15 August 1952 (age 73)
- Died: 28 December 2022 (aged 70).

Sport
- Sport: Basketball

Hirofumi Numata (沼田 宏文, Numata Hirofumi; born 15 August 1952 died 28 December 2022) is a Japanese basketball player. He competed in the men's tournament at the 1972 Summer Olympics and the 1976 Summer Olympics.
