= Nobuo Amayake =

Japanese Go player (born 1934)

Personal information
- Native name: 天宅信雄 (Japanese); アマヤケノブオ (Japanese)
- Full name: Nobuo Amayake
- Born: April 29, 1934 (age 92) Kyoto, Japan

Sport
- Turned pro: 1955
- Retired: 2001
- Teacher: Goro Fujita
- Rank: 9 dan

Nobuo Amayake (天宅 信雄, Amayake Nobuo; born April 29, 1934) is a retired Japanese professional Go player.

== Biography ==
Abe was born in Kyoto City, Kyoto Prefecture, Japan. He became a professional in 1955.

== Promotion record ==
Rank	Year	Notes
1 dan	1955	
2 dan	1958	
3 dan	1961	
4 dan	1966	
5 dan	1970	
6 dan	1976	
7 dan	1981	
8 dan		
9 dan		
