= Jiří Balaštík =

Czech basketball player

Personal information
- Nationality: Czech
- Born: 31 May 1951 (age 73)

Sport
- Sport: Basketball

Jiří Balaštík (born 31 May 1951) is a Czech basketball player. He competed in the men's tournament at the 1972 Summer Olympics.
