= Mineo Yoshikawa =

Japanese basketball player

Personal information
- Nationality: Japanese
- Born: 3 October 1947 (age 77)

Sport
- Sport: Basketball

Mineo Yoshikawa (吉川 峰夫, Yoshikawa Mineo, born 3 October 1947) is a Japanese basketball player. He competed in the men's tournament at the 1972 Summer Olympics.
