= Robert Barrie (pentathlete) =

Australian modern pentathlete (born 1951)

Personal information
- Born: 11 October 1951 (age 74)

Sport
- Sport: Modern pentathlon

Robert Barrie (born 11 October 1951) is an Australian modern pentathlete. He competed at the 1972 and 1980 Summer Olympics. He is head coach of Bulli Swords Club and also coaches swimming in Wollongong.
