= Liga Mayor de Baloncesto =

- Founded: 2017; 9 years ago
- First season: 2017 Apertura
- Country: El Salvador
- Confederation: FIBA Americas (Americas)
- Number of teams: 10
- Level on pyramid: 1
- Current champions: Metapan BC (5th title) (2026 Apertura)
- Most championships: Santa Tecla BC; Metapan BC (5 titles)
- 2026 Apertura

The Liga Mayor de Baloncesto (LMB) is a men's professional basketball league in Americas, currently composed of 9 teams. It is the premier professional men's basketball league in El Salvador. It is the top level of the El Salvador basketball league system. The league is controlled by the El Salvador Basketball Federation (in Spanish: Federación Salvadoreña de Baloncesto.).

== History ==
The league was formed in 2017, following the end of the previous iteration of the first division Liga Superior de Baloncesto de El Salvador.

== Current clubs ==
The Liga Mayor de Baloncesto (LMB) was founded in 2017 with nine teams. Due to club expansions, reductions and relocations, many of the teams either changed or ceased to exist. There are currently eleven teams for 2025 Apertura. The teams are located in San Salvador, Santa ANa, La Libertad, San Vicenete, Ahuachapan, Usulutan and Cuscatlan. The TBD are the oldest club in the competition, having participated in every season since 2017.

- Metapan BC
- San Salvador BC
- Cojute BC ( Club Municipal de Baloncesto de Cojutepeque)
- Santiagueno BC
- Brujos de Izalco BC
- Santa Ana B.C.
- Santa Tecla BC (Santa Tecla IMDELS)
- Chalchuapa United (Lobos)
- Salvadoreños BC
- Ahuachapán

=== Former clubs ===
- FAS-Denver (2017)
- El Rápido La Unión (2017)
- Halcones de Sonzacate (2017-2020)
- Once Lobos (-2019)
- Giants de San Salvador (2017-2018)
- Canarios de Once Municipal (2017)
- San Miguel BC (2017)
- Arcense Biomedical BC (2017)
- Tigres Voladores STGO de Maria
- Aguila BC (-2023)
- Quezaltepeque BC (2017-2023)
- Nejapa B.C (2017-2023)
- Fantasmas de San Vicente
- CD Aguila Basquetball

== Honours ==
=== List of champions ===
Team	Titles	Winning Seasons	Notes
Santa Tecla BC	5	2016 Clausura, 2018 Clausura, 2019 Clausura, 2021 Apertura, 2023 Clausura	Record holder of consecutive finals appearances in a major Salvadoran professional sports league.
Metapán BC	5	2023 Apertura, 2024 Clausura, 2024 Apertura, 2025 Apertura, 2026 Apertura	
Brujos de Izalco	3	2016 Apertura, 2017 Apertura, 2018 Apertura	TBD.
San Salvador	3	2019 Clausura , 2021 Clausura, 2022 Clausura	TBD.
C.D. Aguila	2	2015 Apertura, 2022 Apertura	TBD.
Halcones de Sonsonate	1	2017 Clausura	TBD.
Lobos BKB	1	2025 Clausura	TBD.
FAS-Denver	1	2015 Clausura	TBD.
TBD	1	2001	TBD.

== Champions ==
Year	Champion	Coach	Result	Runners up	Coach	League MVP	Finals MVP	Notes
2017 Clausura	Halcones (1)	TBD	3–1	Santa Tecla BC (0)	TBD	(Puerto Rico) (Nicaragua) Jared Ruiz	(Puerto Rico) (Nicaragua) Jared Ruiz	
2017 Apertura	Brujos de Izalco (1)	(El Salvador) William Ávalos	2-0	Isidro Metapan (0)	William Avalos	(United States) Christopher Blake	(United States) Garland Mcarthur	
2018 Clausura	Santa Tecla BC (1)	(Cuba) Rainel Panfet	3–1	Quezaltepeque (0)	(El Salvador) Ernesto "Colocho" Rodríguez	(Puerto Rico) (Nicaragua) Jared Ruiz	(Cuba) Lisvan Valdez	
2018 Apertura	Brujos de Izalco (2)	(El Salvador) William Ávalos	3-2	Halcones (1)	TBD	(United States) Christopher Blake	(Colombia) Michaell Jackson	
2019 Clausura	San Salvador BC (1)	(Costa Rica) Yull Scott	3–1	Quezaltepeque (0)	(Spain) (El Salvador) José Luis Dámaso	(Cuba) Marvin Cairo	(Colombia) Michaell Jackson	
2019 Apertura	Santa Tecla BC (2)	(Cuba) Rainel Panfet	4–1	Isidro Metapan (0)	TBD	(Cuba) Lisvan Valdez	(United States) Christopher Blake	
2020 Clausura	(Season Cancelled) (1)	None	None	(Season Cancelled) (3)	None	None	None	
2020 Apertura	(Season Cancelled) (1)	None	None	(Season Cancelled) (3)	None	None	None	
2021 Clausura	San Salvador BC (2)	(El Salvador) William Ávalos	4–1	Aguila BKB (0)	TBD	(Dominican Republic) Bernardo Polanco	(Puerto Rico) Owen Perez	
2021 Apertura	Santa Tecla BC (3)	(Cuba) Adrian Paumier	4–1	San Salvador BC (1)	TBD	(United States) Andravious Smith	(El Salvador) Brian Vasquez	
2022 Clausura	Aguila BC (1)	(Argentina) Pablo Epeloa	3-0	Santa Tecla BC (3)	(El Salvador) William Avalos	(United States) Christopher Blake	(United States) Marquise Mosley	
2022 Apertura	San Salvador BC (2)	TBD	3-0	Isidro Metapan(3)	(Argentina) Pablo Epeloa	(United States) Marc Montavious	(United States) Christopher Blake	
2023 Clausura	Santa Tecla BC (5)	(El Salvador) Ernesto Rodriguez	3–0	Cojute BC (5)	(El Salvador) Jose Rivas	(Cuba) Yoel Cubillas	(Dominican Republic) Adonis Lopez	
2023 Apertura	Metapan BC (1)	(Cuba) Reinaldo Corrales	3–1	Brujos de Izalco (3)	(El Salvador) Francisco Lemus	(Cuba) Yoel Cubillas	(Cuba) Yoel Cubillas	
2024 Clausura	Metapan BC (2)	(Cuba) Reinaldo Corrales	3–1	Santa Ana BC (3)	(El Salvador) Melvin Marroquin	TBD	TBD	
2024 Apertura	Metapan BC (3)	(Cuba) Reinaldo Corrales	3–2	Lobos BKB (3)	(El Salvador) Alexander Colocho	(Cuba) Yoel Cubillas	TBD	
2025 Apertura	Metapan BC (4)	(United States) (El Salvador) Alessandro Rouco	3–2	San Salvador BC (2)	(El Salvador) José Rivas	(Cuba) Yoel Cubillas	(Cuba) Marvin Cairo	
2025 Clausura	Lobos BKB (1)	(Argentina) Pablo Apeloa	3–1	Metapan BC (4)	(United States) (El Salvador) Alessandro Rouco	TBD	TBD	
2026 Apertura	Metapan BC (5)	(El Salvador) Reinier Muñiz	3–2	Lobos BKB (4)	(Argentina) Pablo Epeloa	TBD	TBD	
2026 Clausura	TBD ()	TBD	–	TBD ()	TBD	TBD	TBD	

== List of coaches ==
- (Spain) José Luis Dámaso Martinez (A.D. Isidro Metapan, Quezaltepeque Basketball Club)
- (El Salvador) Ricardo Renderos - Halcones
- (El Salvador) Roberto Carrillo - Santa Tecla BC
- (El Salvador) William Avalos - Santa Tecla BC
- (Cuba) Adrián Paumier - Santa Tecla BC
- Joaquin Meralega - Aguila
- Ismael Ochoa - Aguila
- Cristopher Blade - Aguila
- Shannel Brackett - Cojuetepeque
- Orestes Quiroz - Once Lobos
- Patrick Davis - FASDenver
- Marlon Viana - (Once Lobos, AB lobos)
- (Cuba) (United States) Sergio Rouco - (Salvadoreños)

== List of players ==
- (Canada) Jose Colorado - AD Isidro Metapan BC
- (Canada) Jose Arajuo - Brujos de Izalco
- (Colombia) Michael Hinestroza - Brujos de Izalco
- (Colombia) Cristian Arboleda - AD Isidro Metapan BC
- (Colombia) Michael Jackson - San Salvador BC
- (Cuba) Alejandro Alvarez - AD Isidro Metapan BC
- (Cuba) Osmel Oliva - Brujos de Izalco
- (Cuba) Mario Cairo - Quezaleque BC
- (Cuba) Yoel Cubillas - San Salvador BC, Metapan BC
- (Cuba) Oreste Torres - Quezaleque BC
- (Cuba) Yunistel Molina - San Salvador BC
- (Dominican Republic) Pasval Medrano - Halcones
- (Dominican Republic) Leadro Cabrera - Santa Tecla BC
- (Nicaragua) Barthel Lopez - AD Isidro Metapan BC
- (United States) Ron Patten Jnr - Brujos de Izalco
- (United States) Jose Ortiz - Chalchuapa Utd
- (United States) Marcus Feige - Chalchuapa Utd
- (United States) Dennis Miles - Chalchuapa Utd
- (United States) Jacarre Crockett - Quezaleque BC
- (United States) Mark Montavious - Santa Ana BC
- (United States) David Hage - Santa Ana BC
- (United States) Jaston Nixon - Santa Ana BC
- (United States) Timonthy Jackson - Halcones
- (United States) Joey Luis Baez - Halcones
- (United States) Quincy Scates - CBM Cojutepeque
- (United States) Shahmel Brackett - CBM Cojutepeque
- (United States) Marcus Faison - Santa Tecla BC
- (United States) Roberto Martinez - San Salvador BC
- (United States) William Kenneth - Aguila BC
- (United States) Malam Macam - Aguila BC
- (United States) Eddie Isthmin - Once Lobos BC
- (Puerto Rico) Lee Vasquez - Aguila BC
- (Puerto Rico) Jeremy Agosto - Cojute

- (United States) Darius Daniels - Fantasmas De San Vicente
