= Coliseo Héctor Solá Bezares =

Indoor sporting arena in Caguas, Puerto Rico

Coordinates: 18.239376°N 66.054062°W

Coliseo Héctor Solá Besares (English: Hector Sola Bezares Coliseum) was an indoor sporting arena located in Caguas, Puerto Rico. It was used mostly for basketball and was the home arena of the Criollos de Caguas of the National Superior Basketball (BSN) league. The capacity of the arena was around 10,000 spectators.

Also the Coliseo is the home ground for Criollas de Caguas volleyball team from Liga de Voleibol Superior Femenino.

The coliseum had also been the venue for major boxing fights, including some with Miguel Cotto and Ivan Calderon, and has been showcased on ESPN Friday Night Fights.

It was also known for holding the first World Wrestling Council (WWC) wrestling card in 1973.

The coliseum sustained extensive damages as a result of Hurricane Maria on September 20, 2017.

As of 2026, on February 19, the Coliseo was officially demolished after years of unable to be renovated since the 2017 hurricane; as there are plans to build a new modern coliseum that will contain 3 floors and a capacity to hold 6,500 spectators, which would be expected to end by the year 2028.
