= Liga Superior de Baloncesto de El Salvador =

Top level of the El Salvador basketball system

- Current season, competition or edition: 2013–14 Liga Superior de BKB
- Sport: Basketball
- Founder: TBD
- First season: 2013 (12–13)
- President: To be determined
- No. of teams: 8
- Country: El Salvador
- Most recent champion: San Marcos
- Most titles: San Marcos (TBD titles)
- Broadcaster: TBD
- Level on pyramid: 1st Tier - (El Salvador)
- Relegation to: None
- Related competitions: TBD
- Website: []

The Liga Superior de Baloncesto de El Salvador (abbreviated Liga Superior de BKB, and literally in English "National Basketball League") is the top level of the El Salvador basketball league system. The league is controlled by the El Salvador Basketball Federation (in Spanish: Federación Salvadoreña de Baloncesto.).

It is designed like the NBA, with regular season, and playoffs.

The league came to an end in 2016, a new league was formed and rebranded as Liga Mayor de Baloncesto or LMB for short.

== Current teams (2013–14 season) ==
=== Liga Superior de BKB ===
- San Marcos
- Soles de San Salvador (replaced UTEC)
- Denver
- Leones
- Rolls-Royce
- Santa Ana B.C.
- Chaleco
- AND1 San Miguel

== List of Champions ==
Season	Champion	Runner-up	Result	League MVP	Finals MVP	Winning Coach
2013-2014	San Marcoos	Soles deSan Salvador	2–0	Salvador Bandek (San Marcos)	Ernesto Oglivie (Denver)	
