= Miguel Álvarez Pozo =

Cuban basketball player

Medal record

Men's basketball

Representing Cuba

Olympic Games
Bronze medal – third place	1972 Munich	Team competition

José Miguel Álvarez Pozo (26 November 1949 – 31 May 2016) is a former basketball player from Cuba, who won the bronze medal with the men's national team at the 1972 Summer Olympics in Munich, West Germany.
