= Ricky Calzada =

Puerto Rican basketball player

Ricardo "Ricky" Calzada Benoit (born 4 September 1953) in Santurce, Puerto Rico is a Puerto Rican former basketball player who competed in the 1972 Summer Olympics.
