= Karl Ampt =

German basketball player (born 1949)

Personal information
- Nationality: German
- Born: 11 April 1949 (age 75); Marburg, Germany

Sport
- Sport: Basketball

Karl Ampt (born 11 April 1949) is a former German basketball player. He competed in the men's tournament at the 1972 Summer Olympics.
