= Santa Tecla BC =

Salvadoran basketball team

- Leagues: Liga Mayor de Baloncesto; Liga Centroamericana de clubes de baloncesto
- Founded: 2015
- Arena: Gimnasio Nacional José Adolfo Pineda
- Capacity: 12,500
- Location: Santa Tecla, El Salvador
- Website: Official website
Home

Santa Tecla BC is a Salvadoran professional basketball team that competes in the Salvadoran Liga Mayor de Baloncesto and the international Liga Centroamericana de clubes de baloncesto.

== Notable players ==
- Set a club record or won an individual award as a professional player.
- Played at least one official international match for his senior national team at any time.

- (El Salvador) Carlos Alas
- (Cuba) Lisván Valdés
- (Dominican Republic) Leandro Cabrera
- (United States) Marcus Faison
