= Terry Donovan (archer) =

Australian archer (born 1944)

Terene Eva Donovan (born 27 December 1944) is an Australian archer. She competed at three Olympic Games, in 1972, 1980 and 1984.

She is a member of the Australian Archery Hall of Fame.
