= Mauro Cerioni =

Italian basketball player (born 1948)

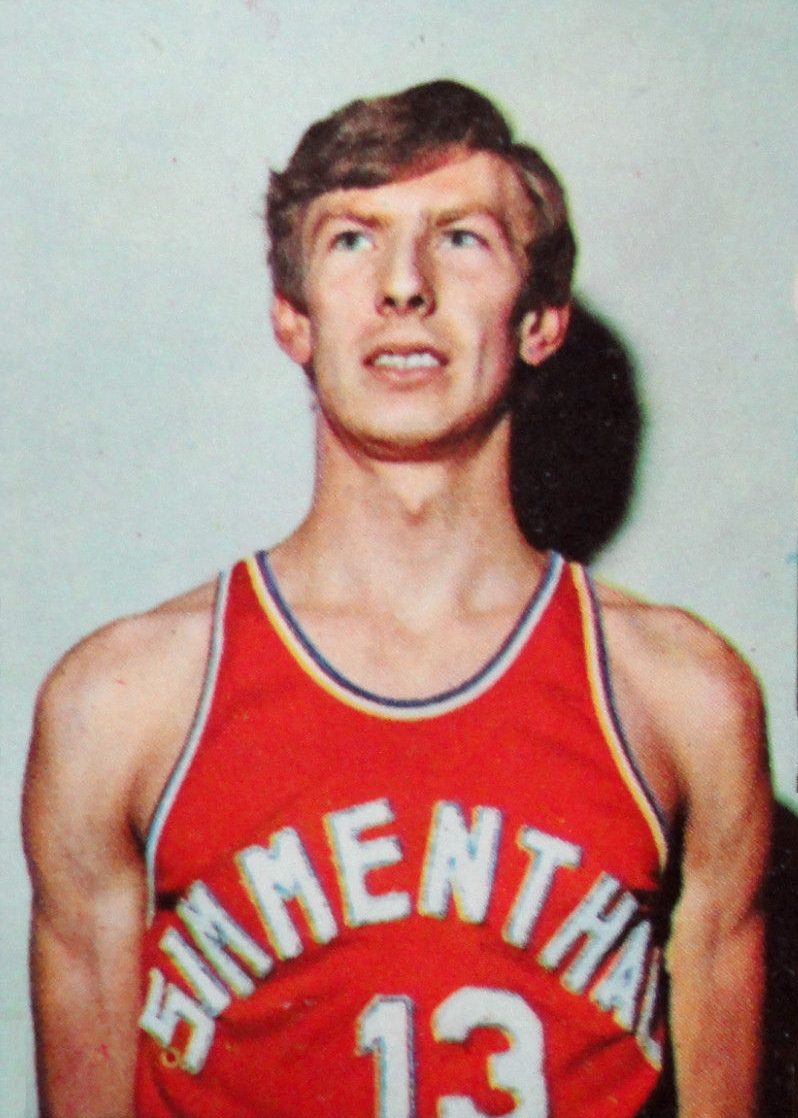

Personal information
- Born: 3 August 1948 (age 77) Castelvetro Piacentino, Italy
- Height: 1.94 m (6 ft 4 in)
- Weight: 83 kg (183 lb)

Sport
- Sport: Basketball
- Club: Olimpia Milano
Medal record
Representing Italy

Mauro Cerioni (born 3 August 1948) is a retired Italian basketball player. He was part of the Italian team that finished fourth at the 1972 Summer Olympics.
