= Nereida Rodríguez =

Cuban fencer

Personal information
- Born: 13 April 1950 (age 76)

Sport
- Sport: Fencing

Nereida Rodríguez (born 13 April 1950) is a Cuban fencer. She competed in the women's team foil event at the 1972 Summer Olympics.
