= Ryszard Białowąs =

Polish basketball player (1947–2004)

Personal information
- Nationality: Polish
- Born: 14 July 1947; Sulechów, Poland
- Died: 23 February 2004 (aged 56); Wrocław, Poland

Sport
- Sport: Basketball

Ryszard Białowąs (14 July 1947 – 23 February 2004) was a Polish basketball player. He competed in the men's tournament at the 1972 Summer Olympics.
