= Hans-Jörg Krüger =

German basketball player (1942–2023)

Personal information
- Nationality: German
- Born: 26 January 1942
- Died: 4 May 2023 (aged 77)

Sport
- Sport: Basketball

Hans-Jörg Krüger (26 January 1942 – 4 May 2023) was a German basketball player. He competed in the men's tournament at the 1972 Summer Olympics.

Krüger died on 4 May 2023, at the age of 77.
