= Graeme Jose =

Australian cyclist (1951–1973)

- Jose in 1972

Personal information
- Born: 21 November 1951 Whyalla, Australia
- Died: 23 June 1973 (aged 21) Feldkirch, Austria

Cycling career
- Sport: Cycling

Graeme Jose (21 November 1951 – 23 June 1973) was an Australian cyclist. He competed in the individual road race and team time trial events at the 1972 Summer Olympics. On 23 June 1973, while taking part in a race in Feldkirch, Austria, he ran into the rear of a parked tray topped lorry and was killed.
