= Joachim Linnemann =

German basketball player (born 1951)

Personal information
- Born: 17 April 1951 (age 73); Frankfurt, West Germany

Career history
- 1971–1972: USC Heidelberg

Joachim Linnemann (born 17 April 1951) is a former West German basketball player. He competed in the men's tournament at the 1972 Summer Olympics.
