= Pedro Abreu =

Cuban basketball player

Personal information
- Full name: Pedro Abreu Pascal
- Nationality: Cuban
- Born: 1 February 1957 (age 68)
- Height: 2 m (6 ft 7 in)
- Weight: 88 kg (194 lb)

Sport
- Sport: Basketball

Pedro Abreu Pascal (born 1 February 1957) is a Cuban basketball player. He competed in the 1980 Summer Olympics.
