= Dieter Kuprella =

German basketball player (1946–2025)

Personal information
- Nationality: German
- Born: 5 February 1946; Gelsenkirchen, North Rhine, Germany
- Died: 7 July 2025 (aged 79)

Sport
- Sport: Basketball

Dieter Kuprella (5 February 1946 – 7 July 2025) was a German basketball player who competed in the men's tournament at the 1972 Summer Olympics. He died on 7 July 2025, at the age of 79.
