= Adrián Bertolini =

Uruguayan basketball player (born 1978)

Adrián Bertolini (born 9 August 1978) is an Uruguayan basketball player, currently playing for Cader in the Uruguayan second division. He plays as a point guard.
