= Richard, Duke of York (disambiguation) =

Richard, Duke of York may refer to:

- Richard of York, 3rd Duke of York (1411–1460), father of Edward IV and Richard III of England
- Richard of Shrewsbury, 1st Duke of York (1473–unknown), second son of Edward IV of England, one of the Princes in the Tower
- William Shakespeare's play Henry VI, Part 3 is fully titled The True Tragedy of Richard, Duke of York, and the Death of Good King Henry the Sixth, with the whole Contention between the two houses Lancaster and York, sometimes abbreviated as Richard Duke of York
- Richard IV of England (Blackadder), a fictional king in the first series of Blackadder, who was Duke of York prior to becoming king
