= Miguel Calderón Gómez =

Cuban basketball player (1950–2025)

Medal record

Men's basketball

Representing Cuba

Olympic Games
Bronze medal – third place	1972 Munich	Team competition

Miguel Ángel "Miguelito" Calderón Gómez (30 October 1950 – 18 September 2025) was a Cuban basketball player and coach. He represented Cuba at three Olympic Games and two FIBA World Championships, winning a bronze medal at the 1972 Summer Olympics and placing fourth at the 1974 FIBA World Championship. After retiring as a player, he coached the men's national team from 1992 to 1999 and won titles at the Centrobásquet tournament as well as multiple championships with Capitalinos in the Liga Superior de Baloncesto. Calderón died in Havana on 18 September 2025.

== Early life ==
Calderón was born on 30 October 1950 in Havana.

== Playing career ==
Calderón competed in the 1968 Summer Olympics in Mexico City, the 1972 Summer Olympics in Munich, and the 1980 Summer Olympics in Moscow. His most notable performance came in Munich, where he won a bronze medal with the national team. He also secured a bronze medal at the 1971 Pan American Games, establishing himself as one of the leading figures of Cuban basketball on the international stage. Calderón also competed at the 1970 FIBA World Championship, and later contributed to the fourth-place finish at the 1974 FIBA World Championship in Puerto Rico.

=== Coaching career ===
Calderón served as head coach of the senior national team from 1992 to 1999 and oversaw youth squads, fostering athletes who went on to achieve success at both national and international levels. He won major titles at the Centrobasquet tournament and multiple championships with Capitalinos in the Liga Superior de Baloncesto.

Calderón coached Cuba in the opening game of the 1992 Tournament of the Americas against the United States "Dream Team." After the 136-57 loss, Calderón remarked that it was the first game between an NBA and an amateur team and described it as "an achievement for us just to play against them." He called the U.S. squad "a perfect basketball machine" and remarked "Only another NBA team would have a chance. We had none. As we say in Cuba: 'You can't cover the sun with your finger.'"

== Later life and death ==
CiberCuba reported that Calderón had been living in precarious conditions at the Comandante Manuel Fajardo Hospital in Havana, where he had lost his vision and suffered from serious health problems. His situation was first made public in February 2025 by journalist Aníbal Oliva Yañez. CiberCuba noted that his case reflected the neglect faced by many retired Cuban athletes, who often live their later years without state support or medical assistance.

Calderón died on 18 September 2025, at the age of 74, a death later confirmed by Granma.
