= Bruce Featherston =

Australian swimmer

Personal information
- Born: 10 July 1952 (age 73)

Sport
- Sport: Swimming
- Strokes: Backstroke, freestyle, medley

Bruce Featherston (born 10 July 1952) is an Australian former swimmer. He competed in five events at the 1972 Summer Olympics.
