= Katsuhiko Sugita =

Japanese basketball player

Personal information
- Nationality: Japanese
- Born: 8 May 1946 (age 78); Saito, Japan

Sport
- Sport: Basketball

Katsuhiko Sugita (杉田 勝彦, Sugita Katsuhiko, born 8 May 1946) is a Japanese basketball player. He competed in the men's tournament at the 1972 Summer Olympics.
