= Pedro Chappé =

Cuban basketball player (1945–2003)

Personal information
- Born: June 16, 1945
- Died: May 15, 2003 (aged 57) Spain
- Listed height: 195 cm (6 ft 5 in)
- Listed weight: 97 kg (214 lb)
Medals
Men's basketball
Representing Cuba
Olympic Games
Bronze medal – third place	1972 Munich	Team competition

Pedro Chappé García (June 16, 1945 – May 15, 2003) was a basketball player from Cuba, who won the bronze medal with the men's national team at the 1972 Summer Olympics in Munich, West Germany.
