= Tom Bender (basketball) =

Australian basketball player

Personal information
- Full name: Thomas Erwin Bender
- Nationality: Australian
- Born: 27 September 1944 Westgate, Iowa, U.S.
- Died: 20 January 2014 (aged 69)

Sport
- Sport: Basketball

Thomas Erwin Bender (27 September 1944 – 20 January 2014) was an Australian basketball player. He competed in the men's tournament at the 1972 Summer Olympics.
