= Tomás Herrera Martínez =

Cuban basketball player (1950–2020)

Medal record

Men's basketball

Representing Cuba

Olympic Games
Bronze medal – third place	1972 Munich	Team competition

Tomás Herrera Martinez (21 December 1950 – 18 October 2020) was a basketball player from Cuba, who won the bronze medal with the men's national team at the 1972 Summer Olympics in Munich, West Germany.

== Career ==
Martinez was born in Santiago de Cuba on 21 December 1950. During the 1979 Pan-Am Games, he broke Kyle Macy's jaw with an intentional elbow; while he was ejected from the game, he was not banned from the games despite having earlier assaulted another player. He was also involved in an incident during the 1973 World University Games vs. the United States National Team.

Martinez died on 18 October 2020 at the age of 69.

== Links ==
- Profile, databaseOlympics.com via archive.org
- Profile, sports-reference.com via archive.org
