= Joseph Diandy =

Senegalese basketball player

Personal information
- Nationality: Senegalese
- Born: 20 March 1950 (age 75)

Sport
- Sport: Basketball

Joseph Diandy (born 20 March 1950) is a Senegalese basketball player. He competed in the men's tournament at the 1972 Summer Olympics.
