= Mickey Coll =

Puerto Rican basketball player (1951–1972)

Mickey Coll (12 February 1951, in San Juan, Puerto Rico – 23 December 1972, on a motorcycle accident in Barceloneta, Puerto Rico) was a Puerto Rican basketball player who competed in the 1972 Summer Olympics.

== Doping controversy ==
Coll tested positive for amphetamine at the 1972 Olympics and was suspended for the rest of the Games.
