= Franklin Standard =

Cuban basketball player (1949–2021)

Medal record

Men's basketball

Representing Cuba

Olympic Games
| Bronze medal – third place | 1972 Munich | Team competition |

Franklin Standard Johnson (June 8, 1949 – October 7, 2021) was a Cuban basketball player who won the bronze medal with the men's national team at the 1972 Summer Olympics in Munich, West Germany. He was born in Havana in June 1949.

Standard died in October 2021, at the age of 72.

== Sources ==
- databaseOlympics
- Evans, Hilary; Gjerde, Arild; Heijmans, Jeroen; Mallon, Bill; et al. "Franklin Standard". Olympics at Sports-Reference.com. Sports Reference LLC. Archived from the original on 2009-02-21.
