= Pierre Sagna (basketball) =

Senegalese basketball player (1950–2026)

Personal information
- Nationality: Senegalese
- Born: 11 June 1950
- Died: 16 August 2026 (aged 76)

Sport
- Sport: Basketball

Pierre Martin Sagna (11 June 1950 – 16 August 2026) was a Senegalese basketball player. He competed in the men's tournament at the 1972 Summer Olympics. Sagna died on 16 August 2026, at the age of 76.
