= Rafael Cañizares =

Cuban basketball player (born 1950)

Medal record

Men's Basketball

Representing Cuba

Olympic Games
Bronze medal – third place	1972 Munich	Team Competition

Rafael Cañizares Poey (born 24 March 1950) is a former basketball player from Cuba, who won the bronze medal with the men's national team at the 1972 Summer Olympics in Munich, West Germany.
