= Conrado Pérez =

Cuban basketball player (born 1950)

Medal record

Men's basketball

Representing Cuba

Olympic Games
| Bronze medal – third place | 1972 Munich | Team competition |

Conrado Pérez Armenteros (born 21 December 1950 in Villa Clara Province) is a former basketball player from Cuba, who won the bronze medal with the men's national team at the 1972 Summer Olympics in Munich, West Germany.
