= Sylvestre Lopis =

Senegalese basketball player

Personal information
- Nationality: Senegalese
- Born: 31 December 1947 (age 77)

Sport
- Sport: Basketball

Sylvestre Lopis (born 31 December 1947) is a Senegalese basketball player. He competed in the men's tournament at the 1972 Summer Olympics.
