= Glenn Marsland =

Australian basketball player

Personal information
- Nationality: Australian
- Born: 30 June 1947 (age 77)

Sport
- Sport: Basketball

Glenn Marsland (born 30 June 1947) is an Australian basketball player. He competed in the men's tournament at the 1972 Summer Olympics.

In 1972 at the time of the Munich Olympic Massacre, Glenn was a Physical Education Teacher at Unley High School, Kitchener Street, Netherby, South Australia.
