= Juan Roca Brunet =

Cuban basketball player (1950–2022)

Medal record

Men's basketball

Representing Cuba

Olympic Games
Bronze medal – third place	1972 Munich	Team competition

Central American and Caribbean Games
Silver medal – second place	1974 Santo Domingo	Team competition
Gold medal – first place	1978 Medellín	Team competition

Juan Roca Brunet (October 27, 1950 – July 9, 2022) was a basketball player from Cuba who won the bronze medal with the men's national team at the 1972 Summer Olympics in Munich, West Germany. Roca was also a member of the Cuban team in the 1976 Montréal Olympics, which finished in seventh place.

Roca also found success outside of the Olympics, competing in the 1974 and 1978 Central American and Caribbean Games, where he won gold and silver, respectively.
