= Nobuo Hattori =

Japanese basketball player (born 1947)

Personal information
- Nationality: Japanese
- Born: 19 July 1947 (age 77)

Sport
- Sport: Basketball

Nobuo Hattori (服部 信雄, Hattori Nobuo, born 19 July 1947) is a Japanese basketball player. He competed in the men's tournament at the 1972 Summer Olympics.
