= Nobuo Chigusa =

Japanese basketball player (born 1948)

Personal information
- Nationality: Japanese
- Born: 20 October 1948 (age 76)

Sport
- Sport: Basketball

Nobuo Chigusa (千種 信雄, Chigusa Nobuo, born 20 October 1948) is a Japanese basketball player. He competed in the men's tournament at the 1972 Summer Olympics and the 1976 Summer Olympics.
