= Juan Domecq =

Cuban basketball player (born 1950)

Medal record

Men's basketball

Representing Cuba

Olympic Games
Bronze medal – third place	1972 Munich	Team competition

Juan Carlos Domecq Fortuondo (born June 10, 1950) is a former basketball player from Cuba, who won the bronze medal with the men's national team at the 1972 Summer Olympics in Munich, West Germany.
