= Alejandro Urgelles Guibot =

Cuban basketball player (1951–1984)

Medal record

Men's basketball

Representing Cuba

Olympic Games
Bronze medal – third place	1972 Munich	Team competition

Alejandro Urgelles Guibot (July 2, 1951 in Santiago de Cuba – October 6, 1984) was a basketball player from Cuba, who won the bronze medal with the men's national team at the 1972 Summer Olympics in Munich, West Germany.
