= Richard Duke (basketball) =

Australian basketball player

Personal information
- Nationality: Australian
- Born: 25 May 1948 (age 76); Melbourne, Australia

Sport
- Sport: Basketball

Richard Duke (born 25 May 1948) is an Australian basketball player. He competed in the men's tournament at the 1972 Summer Olympics.
