= Volleyball at the 1966 Central American and Caribbean Games =

Volleyball events were contested at the 1966 Central American and Caribbean Games in San Juan, Puerto Rico.

Event	Gold	Silver	Bronze
Men's volleyball	Cuba (CUB)	Venezuela (VEN)	Mexico (MEX)
Women's volleyball	Cuba (CUB)	Mexico (MEX)	Dominican Republic (DOM)
