= Volleyball at the 1970 Central American and Caribbean Games =

Volleyball events were contested at the 1970 Central American and Caribbean Games in Panama City, Panama.

Event	Gold	Silver	Bronze
Men's volleyball	Cuba (CUB)	Venezuela (VEN)	Mexico (MEX)
Women's volleyball	Mexico (MEX)	Cuba (CUB)	Venezuela (VEN)
