= Basketball at the 1976 Summer Olympics – Men's team rosters =

Twelve men's teams competed in basketball at the 1976 Summer Olympics.

== Group A ==
=== Australia ===
The following players represented Australia:

- Andy Campbell
- Andris Blicavs
- Tony Barnett
- Eddie Palubinskas
- Ian Watson
- John Maddock
- Michael Tucker
- Perry Crosswhite
- Peter Walsh
- Ray Tomlinson
- Robbie Cadee
- Russell Simon
- Head coach: Lindsay Gaze

=== Canada ===
The following players represented Canada:

- Alexander Devlin
- Martin Riley
- Bill Robinson
- John Cassidy
- Derek Sankey
- Robert Sharpe
- Cameron Hall
- Jamie Russell
- Robert Town
- Romel Raffin
- Lars Hansen
- Philip Tollestrup
- Head coach: John Donohue

=== Cuba ===
The following players represented Cuba:

- Alejandro Ortiz
- Alejandro Urgellés
- Angel Padrón
- Daniel Scott
- Juan Domecq
- Juan Roca
- Oscar Varona
- Pedro Chappé
- Rafael Cañizares
- Ruperto Herrera
- Tomás Herrera
- Félix Morales
- Head coach: Carmilo Hortega

=== Japan ===
The following players represented Japan:

- Shigeaki Abe
- Nobuo Chigusa
- Yutaka Fujimoto
- Hideki Hamaguchi
- Norihiko Kitahara
- Kiyohide Kuwata
- Satoshi Mori
- Hirofumi Numata
- Fumio Saito
- Shigeto Shimizu
- Koji Yamamoto
- Shoji Yuki
- Head coach: Masahiko Yoshida

=== Mexico ===
The following players represented Mexico:

- Anastacio Reyes
- Antonio Ayala
- Arturo Guerrero
- Gabriel Nava
- Héctor Rodríguez
- Jorge Flores
- Manuel Raga
- Manuel Sáenz
- Rafael Palomar
- Rubén Alcala
- Samuel Campis
- Jesús García
- Head coach: Carlos Bru

=== Soviet Union ===
The following players represented the Soviet Union:

- Vladimir Arzamaskov
- Aleksandr Salnikov
- Valery Miloserdov
- Alzhan Zharmukhamedov
- Andrei Makeev
- Ivan Edeshko
- Sergei Belov
- Vladimir Tkachenko
- Anatoly Myshkin
- Mikheil Korkia
- Aleksandr Belov
- Vladimir Zhigily
- Head coach: Vladimir Kondrashin

== Group B ==
=== Czechoslovakia ===
The following players represented Czechoslovakia:

- Gustáv Hraška
- Jaroslav Kantůrek
- Jiří Konopásek
- Jiří Pospíšil
- Justin Sedlák
- Kamil Brabenec
- Stano Kropilák
- Vladimír Padrta
- Vladimír Ptáček
- Vojtěch Petr
- Zdeněk Douša
- Zdeněk Kos
- Head coach: Vladimir Heger

=== Egypt ===
The following players represented Egypt:

- Mohamed Essam Khaled
- Fahti Mohamed Kamel
- Hamdi Adly El-Seoudi
- Mohamed El-Gohary Hanafy
- Ahmed Abdel Hamid El-Saharty
- Ismail Selim Mohamed
- Osman Hassan
- Mohamed Hamdi Osman
- Awad Abdel Nabi
- Head coach: Fouad Aboulkheir

=== Italy ===
The following players represented Italy:

- Giuseppe Brumatti
- Giulio Iellini
- Carlo Recalcati
- Luciano Vendemini
- Fabrizio Della Fiori
- Renzo Bariviera
- Marino Zanatta
- Dino Meneghin
- Pier Luigi Marzorati
- Luigi Serafini
- Ivan Bisson
- Gianni Bertolotti
- Head coach: Giancarlo Primo

=== Puerto Rico ===
The following players represented Puerto Rico:

- Butch Lee
- Earl Brown
- Héctor Blondet
- Jimmy Thordsen
- Luis Brignoni
- Mariano Ortiz
- Michael Vicens
- Neftalí Rivera
- Raymond Dalmau
- Bobby Álvarez
- Rubén Rodríguez
- Teo Cruz
- Head coach: Tom Nissalke

=== United States ===
The following players represented the United States:

- Phil Ford
- Steve Sheppard
- Adrian Dantley
- Walter Davis
- William "Quinn" Buckner
- Ernie Grunfeld
- Kenneth Carr
- Scott May
- Michel Armstrong
- Thomas La Garde
- Philip Hubbard
- Mitchell Kupchak
- Head coach: Dean Smith

=== Yugoslavia ===
The following players represented Yugoslavia:

Yugoslavia men's national basketball team roster
Players
Coaches

Pos.	No.	Name	Age – Date of birth	Height	Club
PG	4	Blagoja Georgievski	25 – 15 October 1950	1.83 m (6 ft 0 in)	Rabotnički	(Socialist Federal Republic of Yugoslavia)
SG	5	Dragan Kićanović	22 – 17 August 1953	1.91 m (6 ft 3 in)	Partizan	(Socialist Federal Republic of Yugoslavia)
	6	Vinko Jelovac	27 – 18 September 1948	2.08 m (6 ft 10 in)	AŠK Olimpija	(Socialist Federal Republic of Yugoslavia)
C	7	Rajko Žižić	21 – 22 January 1955	2.10 m (6 ft 11 in)	OKK Beograd	(Socialist Federal Republic of Yugoslavia)
SF	8	Željko Jerkov	24 – 26 December 1951	2.02 m (6 ft 8 in)	Jugoplastika	(Socialist Federal Republic of Yugoslavia)
C	9	Andro Knego	19 – 21 October 1956	2.06 m (6 ft 9 in)	Cibona	(Socialist Federal Republic of Yugoslavia)
PG	10	Zoran Slavnić	26 – 26 October 1949	1.80 m (5 ft 11 in)	Crvena zvezda	(Socialist Federal Republic of Yugoslavia)
C	11	Krešimir Ćosić	27 – 26 November 1948	2.11 m (6 ft 11 in)	Zadar	(Socialist Federal Republic of Yugoslavia)
SF	12	Damir Šolman	26 – 7 September 1949	2.00 m (6 ft 7 in)	Jugoplastika	(Socialist Federal Republic of Yugoslavia)
SF	13	Žarko Varajić	24 – 26 December 1951	2.02 m (6 ft 8 in)	Bosna	(Socialist Federal Republic of Yugoslavia)
F	14	Dražen Dalipagić	24 – 27 November 1951	1.97 m (6 ft 6 in)	Partizan	(Socialist Federal Republic of Yugoslavia)
SG	15	Mirza Delibašić	22 – 9 January 1954	1.97 m (6 ft 6 in)	Bosna	(Socialist Federal Republic of Yugoslavia)

Head coach

- (Socialist Federal Republic of Yugoslavia) Mirko Novosel

Legend

- Club – describes last
  club before the tournament
- Age – describes age
  on 18 July 1976
