= Australia at the 1976 Summer Olympics =

- IOC code: AUS
- NOC: Australian Olympic Federation

in Montreal
- Competitors: 180 (146 men, 34 women) in 20 sports
- Flag bearers: Raelene Boyle (opening); Robert Haigh (closing)
- Medals Ranked 32nd: Gold 0 Silver 1 Bronze 4 Total 5

Summer Olympics appearances (overview)
- 1896; 1900; 1904; 1908; 1912; 1920; 1924; 1928; 1932; 1936; 1948; 1952; 1956; 1960; 1964; 1968; 1972; 1976; 1980; 1984; 1988; 1992; 1996; 2000; 2004; 2008; 2012; 2016; 2020; 2024; 2028

Other related appearances
- 1906 Intercalated Games –––– Australasia (1908–1912)

Australia competed at the 1976 Summer Olympics in Montreal, Quebec, Canada. 180 competitors, 146 men and 34 women, took part in 115 events in 20 sports. Australia performed poorly, winning one silver and four bronze medals, finishing thirty-second on the medals table. This result caused significant negative backlash within the country, and spurred Prime Minister Malcolm Fraser to set up the Australian Institute of Sport.

== Medalists ==
Medal	Name	Sport	Event
Silver	Australia national field hockey team: David Bell; Greg Browning; Ric Charlesworth; Ian Cooke; Barry Dancer; Douglas Golder; Robert Haigh; Wayne Hammond; Jim Irvine; Malcolm Poole; Robert Proctor; Graeme Reid; Ronald Riley; Trevor Smith; Terry Walsh	Field hockey	Men's tournament
Bronze	Stephen Holland	Swimming	Men's 1500m Freestyle
Bronze	John Bertrand	Sailing	Men's finn class
Bronze	Ian Brown, Ian Ruff	Sailing	Men's 470 class
Bronze	Mervyn Bennet, Denis Pigott, Bill Roycroft, Wayne Roycroft	Equestrian	Team eventing

== Archery ==
In the second Olympic archery competition that Australia contested, the nation sent two women and two men. Only one archer, Terry Reilly, had Olympic experience. He dropped 11 places from his 1972 finish.
Women's Individual Competition:

- Carole Toy — 2305 points (→ 15th place)
- Maureen Adams — 2114 points (→ 25th place)

Men's Individual Competition:

- David Anear — 2407 points (→ 13th place)
- Terry Reilly — 2331 points (→ 26th place)

== Athletics ==
Men's 4 × 400 metres Relay

- Max Binnington, Peter Grant, Don Hanly, and Rick Mitchell
  - Heat — 3:05.75 (→ did not advance)

Men's 5.000 metres

- David Fitzsimons
  - Heat — did not start (→ did not advance, no ranking)

Men's 10.000 metres

- Chris Wardlaw
  - Heat — 28:17.52
  - Final — 28:29.91 (→ 12th place)
- David Fitzsimons
  - Heat — 28:16.43
  - Final — 29:17.74 (→ 14th place)

Men's 400m Hurdles

- Don Hanly
  - Heat — 51.90s (→ did not advance)
- Peter Grant
  - Heat — 51.07s (→ did not advance)

Men's Long Jump

- Chris Commons
  - Heat — 7.46m (→ did not advance)

Men's Marathon

- Chris Wardlaw — 2:23:56 (→ 35th place)
- David Chettle — did not finish (→ no ranking)
- Ross Haywood — did not finish (→ no ranking)

Men's 20 km Race Walk

- Ross Haywood — 1:30:59 (→ 12th place)

Men's Hammer Throw

- Peter Farmer
  - Qualifying round — 69.92m
  - Final — 68.00m (→ 12th place)

== Basketball ==
Men's competition

- Preliminary round (Group A):
  - Lost to Cuba (89-111)
  - Lost to Soviet Union (77-93)
  - Defeated Mexico (120-117)
  - Lost to Canada (69-81)
  - Defeated Japan (117-79)
- Classification Matches:
  - 5th/8th place: Lost to Italy (72-79)
  - 7th/8th place: Lost to Cuba (81-92) → 8th place
- Team Roster:
  - Robbie Cadee
  - Ian Watson
  - Andrew Campbell
  - Tony Barnett
  - Eddie Palubinskas
  - Perry Crosswhite
  - Russell Simon
  - Michael Tucker
  - Andris Blicavs
  - Peter Walsh
  - John Maddock
  - Ray Tomlinson
- Head coach: Lindsay Gaze

== Cycling ==
Twelve cyclists represented Australia in 1976.

Individual road race

- Clyde Sefton — 4:49:01 (→ 28th place)
- Remo Sansonetti — 4:49:01 (→ 34th place)
- Alan Goodrope — did not finish (→ no ranking)
- Peter Kesting — did not finish (→ no ranking)

Team time trial

- Ian Chandler
- Remo Sansonetti
- Sal Sansonetti
- Clyde Sefton

Sprint

- Ron Boyle — 20th place

1000m time trial

- Stephen Goodall — 1:08.610 (→ 12th place)

Individual pursuit

- Gary Sutton — 6th place

Team pursuit

- Stephen Goodall
- Kevin Nichols
- Geoff Skaines
- John Thorsen

== Fencing ==
Three fencers, two men and one woman, represented Australia in 1976.

Men's foil

- Greg Benko
- Ernest Simon

Men's épée

- Greg Benko

Women's foil

- Helen Smith

== Hockey ==
Men's competition

- Preliminary round (Group A)
  - Defeated Malaysia (2-0)
  - Defeated Canada (3-0)
  - Defeated India (6-1)
  - Lost to the Netherlands (1-2)
  - Lost to Argentina (2-3)
  - Replay: Defeated India (1-1, 5-4 after penalty strokes)
- Semi-finals
  - Defeated Pakistan (1-2)
- Final
  - Lost to New Zealand (0-1) → Silver Medal
- Team Roster
  - ( 1.) Robert Haigh
  - ( 2.) Ric Charlesworth
  - ( 3.) David Bell
  - ( 4.) Greg Browning
  - ( 5.) Ian Cooke
  - ( 6.) Barry Dancer
  - ( 7.) Douglas Golder
  - ( 8.) Wayne Hammond
  - ( 9.) Jim Irvine
  - (10.) Stephan Marshall
  - (11.) Malcolm Poole
  - (12.) Robert Proctor
  - (13.) Graeme Reid
  - (14.) Ronald Riley
  - (15.) Trevor Smith
  - (16.) Terry Walsh
- Head coach: Mervyn Adams

== Modern pentathlon ==
Two male pentathletes represented Australia in 1976.

Individual

- Peter Ridgway
- Peter Macken

== Shooting ==
Mixed

Athlete	Event	Final	
Athlete	Event	Score	Rank
Donald Brook	50 m rifle, prone	586	41
Donald Brook	50 m rifle three positions	1109	50
Jonathan Gillman	50 m pistol	525	42
Don Gowland	50 m rifle, prone	584	51
Norman Harrison	50 m pistol	540	32
Alexander Taransky	25 m pistol	580	34
Peter Wray	Trap	173	25

== Water polo ==
Men's competition

- Preliminary round (Group C)
  - Lost to Hungary (6-7)
  - Lost to West Germany (3-4)
  - Lost to Canada (5-6)
- Classification group
  - Lost to Canada (3-4)
  - Defeated Iran (8-2)
  - Lost to Soviet Union (2-7)
  - Tied with Mexico (4-4)
  - Lost to Cuba (3-8) → 11th place
- Team roster
  - Andrew Kerr
  - Charles Turner
  - David Neesham
  - David Woods
  - Edmond Brooks
  - Ian Mills
  - Paul Williams
  - Peter Montgomery
  - Randall Goff
  - Rodney Woods
  - Ross Langdon
- Head coach: Tom Hoad

== See also ==
- Australia at the 1974 British Commonwealth Games
- Australia at the 1978 Commonwealth Games
