= Mexico at the 1976 Summer Olympics =

- IOC code: MEX
- NOC: Mexican Olympic Committee

in Montreal
- Competitors: 97 (92 men, 5 women) in 17 sports
- Flag bearer: Teresa Díaz
- Medals Ranked 25th: Gold 1 Silver 0 Bronze 1 Total 2

Summer Olympics appearances (overview)
- 1900; 1904–1920; 1924; 1928; 1932; 1936; 1948; 1952; 1956; 1960; 1964; 1968; 1972; 1976; 1980; 1984; 1988; 1992; 1996; 2000; 2004; 2008; 2012; 2016; 2020; 2024

Mexico competed at the 1976 Summer Olympics in Montreal, Quebec, Canada. 97 competitors, 92 men and 5 women, took part in 54 events in 17 sports.

== Medalists ==
=== Gold ===
- Daniel Bautista – Athletics, Men's 20 km Walk

=== Bronze ===
- Juan Paredes – Boxing, Men's Featherweight

== Athletics ==
Men's 5.000 metres

- Rodolfo Gomez

- Heat – 13:46.23 (→ did not advance)

Men's 10.000 metres

- Luis Hernández

- Heat – 28:44.17 (→ did not advance)

- Rodolfo Gomez

- Heat – 30:05.19 (→ did not advance)

Men's Marathon

- Mario Cuevas – 2:18:08 (→ 18th place)
- Rodolfo Gomez – 2:18:21 (→ 19th place)

Men's 20 km Race Walk

- Daniel Bautista – 1:24:40 (→ Gold Medal)
- Raúl González – 1:28:18 (→ 5th place)
- Domingo Colin – DSQ (→ no ranking)

== Basketball ==
=== Men's team competition ===
- Preliminary round (group A):

- Lost to Soviet Union (77-120)
- Defeated Japan (108-90)
- Lost to Australia (117-120)
- Lost to Cuba (75-89)
- Lost to Canada (84-92)

- Classification Match:

- 9th/10th place: Lost to Puerto Rico (84-89) → 10th place

- Team roster

- Jesús García
- Arturo Guerrero
- Jorge Flores
- Rafael Palomar
- Antonio Ayala
- Samuel Campis
- Héctor Rodríguez
- Anastacio Reyes
- Gabriel Nava
- Ruben Alcala
- Manuel Saenz
- Manuel Raga

- Head coach: Carlos Bru

== Boxing ==
Men's Flyweight (– 51 kg)

- Ernesto Rios

- First Round – Lost to Alfredo Pérez (VEN), 0:5

Men's Featherweight

- Juan Paredes

Men's Middleweight

- Nicolas Arredondo

== Cycling ==
Six cyclists represented Mexico in 1976.

Individual road race

- Rubén Camacho – 4:54:49.0 (→ 45th place)
- Luis Ramos – did not finish (→ no ranking)
- José Castañeda – did not finish (→ no ranking)
- Rodolfo Vitela – did not finish (→ no ranking)

Team time trial
- 2:18:48 – 18th Place

Team roster

- José Castañeda
- Rodolfo Vitela
- Ceferino Estrada
- Francisco Huerta

== Swimming ==
Men's 200m Freestyle

- Eduardo Pérez
- Guillermo García

Men's 100m Backstroke

- José Urueta
- Ignacio Álvarez

Men's 200m Backstroke

- José Urueta
- Ignacio Álvarez

Men's 100m Breaststroke

- Gustavo Lozano

Men's 200m Breaststroke

- Gustavo Lozano

Men's 100m Butterfly

- José Luis Prado

Men's 200m Butterfly

- Ricardo Marmolejo

Men's 400m Individual Medley

- Ricardo Marmolejo
- Guillermo Zavala

Men's 4 × 200 m Freestyle Relay

Men's 4 × 100 m Medley Relay

Women's 100m Breaststroke

- Beatriz Camuñas

Women's 200m Breaststroke

- Beatriz Camuñas

== Water polo ==
=== Men's team competition ===
- Team roster

- Alfred Schmidt
- Arturo Valencia
- Daniel Gómez
- Francisco García
- Javier Guerra
- Jorge Coste
- Juan García
- Juan Yanez
- Maximiliano Aguilar
- Victorino Beristain
- Armando Fernández
