= Egypt at the 1976 Summer Olympics =

- IOC code: EGY
- NOC: Egyptian Olympic Committee

in Montreal Canada
- Medals: Gold 0 Silver 0 Bronze 0 Total 0

Summer Olympics appearances (overview)
- 1912; 1920; 1924; 1928; 1932; 1936; 1948; 1952; 1956; 1960–1964; 1968; 1972; 1976; 1980; 1984; 1988; 1992; 1996; 2000; 2004; 2008; 2012; 2016; 2020; 2024

Other related appearances
- 1906 Intercalated Games –––– United Arab Republic (1960, 1964)

During the 1976 Summer Olympics in Montreal, Quebec, Canada, Egypt, along with many other countries, boycotted due to the participation of New Zealand, who still had sporting links with South Africa.

Athletes from Egypt, Cameroon, Morocco, and Tunisia competed on 18–20 July before these nations withdrew from the Games.

== Results by event ==
=== Basketball ===
==== Men's team competition ====
- lost to Czechoslovakia 103–64
- forfeited remaining games to Italy, Puerto Rico, United States, Yugoslavia, Mexico, and Japan → 12th place
- Team roster
  - Sayed Aboul Dahab
  - Mohamed Essam Khaled
  - Mohamed Khaled El Said
  - Fathi Mohamed Kamel
  - Hamdi El Seoudi
  - Mohamed Hanafi El Gohari
  - Ahmed El Saharti
  - Ismail Mohamed Aly Selim
  - Medhat Mohsen Warda
  - Osman Hassan Farid
  - Mohamed Hamdi Osman
  - Awad Abdel Nabi
- Head coach: Fouad Aboulkheir

=== Boxing ===
Light Flyweight

- Said Mohamed Abdelwahab
  1. defeated José Leroy (FRA) in first round (referee stopped match at 1:59 1st round)
  2. lost to Héctor Patri (ARG) in second round (walkover)

Flyweight

- Said Ahmed Elashry
  1. defeated Sandor Orban (HUN) in first round (5–0)
  2. lost to Alfredo Pérez (VEN) in second round (walkover)

Bantamweight

- Abdelnabi Elsayed Mahran
  1. lost to Bernardo Onori (ITA) in first round (5–0)

=== Weightlifting ===
Flyweight

- Mustafa Aly
  - Snatch: 90.0 kg (15th place)
  - Clean and jerk: missed all 3 attempts

Bantamweight

- Ahmed Mashall
  - Snatch: 90.0 kg (19th place)
  - Clean and jerk: 127.5 kg (14th place)
  - Total: 217.5 kg (14th place)
