= 1980 Tournament of the Americas squads =

This article displays the rosters for the participating teams at the 1980 Tournament of the Americas played in San Juan, Puerto Rico from April 18 to April 25, 1980.

== Argentina ==
- 4 Jorge Martín
- 5 Gustavo Aguirre
- 6 Mauricio Musso
- 7 Carlos Raffaelli
- 8 Carlos Romano
- 9 José Luis Pagella
- 10 Adolfo Perazzo
- 11 Miguel Cortijo
- 12 Eduardo Cadillac
- 13 Carlos González
- 14 Gabriel Milovich
- 15 Luis González

- Head coach: (Argentina) Miguel Ángel Ripullone

== Brazil ==
- 4 Zé Geraldo
- 5 Fausto
- 6 José Carlos
- 7 Carioquinha
- 8 Wagner
- 9 Marquinhos
- 10 Gilson
- 11 Marcel
- 12 Marcelo
- 13 Luiz Gustavo
- 14 Oscar
- 15 Robertão

- Head coach: (Brazil) Cláudio Mortari

== Canada ==
- 4 Howie Kelsey
- 5 Martin Riley
- 6 Doc Ryan
- 7 Varouj Gurunlian
- 8 Tom Bishop
- 9 Jay Triano
- 10 Leo Rautins
- 11 Perry Mirkovich
- 12 Jim Zoet
- 13 Romel Raffin
- 14 Ross Quackenbush
- 15 Reni Dolcetti

- Head coach: (United States) / (Canada) Jack Donohue

== Cuba ==
- 4 Roberto Simón
- 5 Ruperto Herrera
- 6 Alejandro Ortiz
- 7 Noángel Luaces
- 8 Generoso Márquez
- 9 Ángel Padrón
- 10 Pedro Abreu
- 11 Miguel Calderón Gómez
- 12 Tomás Herrera
- 13 Daniel Scott
- 14 Alejandro Urgellés
- 15 Félix Morales

- Head coach: (Cuba) Ernesto Díaz

== Mexico ==
- 4 José Medina
- 5 Arturo Guerrero
- 6 Óscar Ruiz
- 7 Rafael Palomar
- 8 Antonio Ayala
- 9 Samuel Campis
- 10 Guillermo Márquez
- 11 Martín Ron
- 12 Hugo Villegas
- 13 Rubén Alcalá
- 14 Jesús García
- 15 Francisco Ríos

- Head coach: (Mexico) Carlos Quintanar

== Puerto Rico ==
- 4 Georgie Torres
- 5 Steven Sewell
- 6 Neftalí Rivera
- 7 Charlie Bermúdez
- 8 Rubén Rodríguez
- 9 Willie Quiñones
- 10 Angelo Cruz
- 11 Ángel Santiago
- 12 Mario Morales
- 13 Néstor Cora
- 14 Raymond Dalmau
- 15 Roberto Valderas

- Head coach: (Puerto Rico) Flor Meléndez

== Uruguay ==
- 4 Walter Silvera
- 5 Hugo Bianchi
- 6 José Barizo
- 7 Hébert Núñez
- 8 Jorge Garretano
- 9 José Guerra
- 10 Wilfredo Ruiz
- 11 Walter Pagani
- 12 Álvaro Belén
- 13 Germán Haller
- 14 Daniel Wenzel
- 15 Víctor Frattini

- Head coach: (Uruguay) Ramón Etchamendi

== Bibliography ==
- Mexico 2015 FIBA Americas Championship Guía Histórica 1980–2015 (in Spanish). FIBA. 2015. pp. 9–13.
