= Roberto Alvarez =

Roberto Alvarez may refer to:

- Roberto Álvarez (diplomat) (born 1944), Dominican Republic diplomat and minister of foreign affairs
- Roberto Alvárez (born 1960), Mexican cross-country skier
- Roberto Álvarez (tennis) (born 1971), Argentine tennis player
- Roberto Álvarez Ríos (1932–2015), Cuban artist
- Roberto Álvarez (footballer) (1942–2023), Spanish footballer
- The plaintiff in Roberto Alvarez v. Board of Trustees of the Lemon Grove School District (1931), the first successful school desegregation case

== See also ==
- Bobby Álvarez (born 1955), Puerto Rican former basketball player
- Mario Roberto Álvarez (1913–2011), Argentine architect
