= Sansonetti =

Sansonetti is an Italian surname. Notable people with the surname include:

- Étienne Sansonetti (1935–2018), French football player
- Federico Sansonetti (born 1986), Uruguayan tennis player
- Luigi Sansonetti (1888–1959), Italian admiral
- Philippe Sansonetti (born 1949), French microbiologist
- Remo Sansonetti (born 1946), Australian cyclist
- Sal Sansonetti (born 1946), Australian cyclist
- Sarah Sansonetti (born 2001), Australian football player
- Tom Sansonetti (born 1949), American attorney and government official from Wyoming
- Ugo Sansonetti (1919–2019), Italian writer and athlete
