= La Piedad =

Municipality in La Piedad de Cabadas, Mexico

Coordinates: 20°20′N 102°01′W

- Municipality
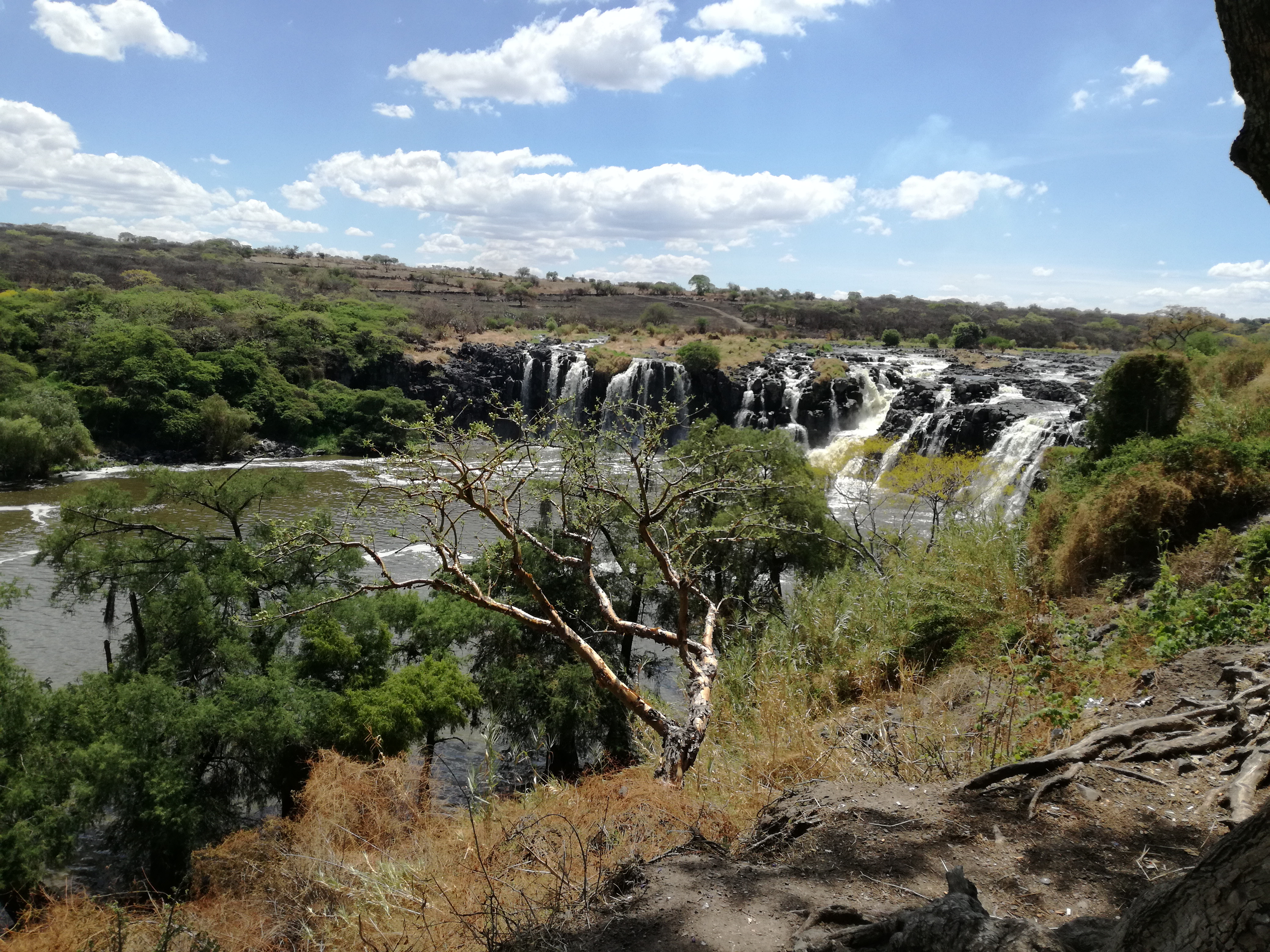
- El Salto waterfall

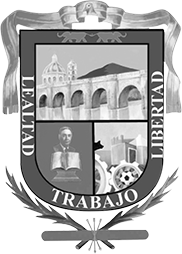
- Coat of arms

- Location of La Piedad in Michoacán
- Municipal Seat: La Piedad de Cabadas

Government
  - Mayor: Samuel David Hidalgo Gallardo

Population (2020)
  - Total: 106,490
- Time zone: UTC-6 (CST)

La Piedad is a municipality located at in the north-west of the Mexican state of Michoacán, bordering Jalisco and Guanajuato and being the northernmost municipality in Michoacán. The municipal seat is the city of La Piedad de Cabadas. The original colonial name was San Sebastián. It is bordered by the town of Santa Ana Pacueco, Guanajuato. Both cities straddle the Lerma River. La Piedad's population was 106,490 inhabitants in the 2020 census (250,000 including its metropolitan area). The municipality has an area of 284.11 km^{2} (109.7 sq mi). It is bordered by the states of Jalisco and Guanajuato.

== Geography ==
La Piedad, "north door" of the state of Michoacán, surrounding the Lerma river, has limits at the north with the municipalities of Degollado, Jalisco and Pénjamo, Guanajuato; at the east with the municipality of Numarán, Michoacán; at the south with the municipalities of Zináparo, Churintzio, and Ecuandureo, Michoacán; and at the west with the municipality of Yurécuaro.

The municipality is connected through roads and highways with cities in the Mexican states of Jalisco, Guanajuato, and of course, the rest of Michoacán.

Distances and average driving times:

- 89 km from Irapuato, Guanajuato. (1 h)
- 120 km from León, Guanajuato. (1 h 15 min)
- 166 km from Morelia, Michoacán. (1 h 40 min)
- 55 km from Zamora, Michoacán. (40 min)
- 177.5 km from Guadalajara, Jalisco. (1 h 50 min)
- 201.0 km from Querétaro. (2 h 00 min)
- 40. km from Penjamillo. (42 min)

== History ==
In the 12th century Aztecas moved away from Aztlan looking for a new land to settle. In this travel they founded several towns. Zula (meaning quails territory) was one of this towns established on the shore of the Lerma river.

In 1380, Tariácuri purepecha's king, conquered the town of Zula and named it Aramutaro, which means place with caves.

Almost two centuries later, Antonio de Villarroel serving Nuño de Guzmán took control of the town on the San Sebastian's day of 1530 (January 20), so renaming the town as "San Sebastián de Aramutarillo".

From 1530 to 1687, San Sebastian was in total oblivion, victim of slavery and ignorance; nevertheless there were two historic facts, which changed course for the town, one political affair and another religious matter.

The religious matter refers to a finding of a branch from a tree resembling Jesus Christ on the Cross. This happened the midnight of Christmas Eve on a place called Buena Huerta. The towns in its surrounding asked for the Jesus Christ image to be taken to their churches. San Sebastián de Aramutarillo was selected to keep the Christ image. After that, the Christ image was called "Señor de La Piedad" (Lord of Mercy) where Templo del Senor de La Piedad was built in its honor, which also has the biggest dome in the country.

The political affair was the movement of political offices from Tlazazalca to San Sebastian de Aramutarillo. This causes that many people came to offer merchandise, crafts, etc. In this way the town was officially founded in 1692, when Juan López de Aguirre named it as La Piedad.

== Attractions ==
Places of interest include the town center with its kiosco (bandstand) built with quarried stone, the gateways, and the Señor de La Piedad church, which boasts perhaps the biggest dome in the country. Also of note are the Cabadas Bridge and the 30-metre-high El Salto waterfall. The local zoo and "La Torre de la Gaviota" located at the Ciudad del Sol neighborhood, are also places of interest in La Piedad.

There are also urban parks such as Morelos Park and La Placa park. The city is known because of its colorful Rebozos, and the singer José Alfredo Jiménez made it more famous with the song "El Perro Negro" ("The Black Dog").

== Industry ==
La Piedad is a hub for agricultural products. The town was once known as the center of the Mexican pork industry, and still plays an important part in that industry. However, La Piedad has recently moved its economy towards textiles. Major textil manufacturers include Olmeca, Marval and Manriquez. Surrounding towns are Santa Ana, Yurecuaro, Degollado, Numaran, and Ecuandureo. La Piedad is also the headquarters for veterinary pharmaceuticals company LaPisa and industrial turbine manufacturer Turbomaquinas and Famaq. Also there is an important candy factory named Cabadas and sausage factories like Nu-tres, Delta and Bafar (former Parma). Most companies are family owned and operated. These are Saldaña and García, the latter owns Turbomaquinas S.A. de C.V., FAMAQ, Turboaleaciones S.A. de C.V. and the former owns Grupo Kasto.

There are 569 companies registered in the municipality, which puts La Piedad in the top four cities in the state with the greatest number of companies, after Morelia, Uruapan, and Zamora.

Ferromex Railway and Kansas City Southern de México crosses La Piedad allowing other companies to settle around in the future.

== Education ==
Currently the municipality has pre-school institutions, elementary, middle and high school, and the following 6 colleges:

- Colegio de Michoacán
- Instituto Tecnológico de La Piedad
- Universidad de León campus La Piedad
- Centro de estudios universitarios Veracruz (Univer) campus La Piedad
- Universidad del Valle de Atemajac campus La Piedad
- Instituto Michoacano de Ciencias de la Educación (IMCED)

Additionally there is a House of Culture, the cultural center piedadense and the Higher School of Music.

== Media ==
- TV channels - There are 2 local channels, Videa Plataforma TV and TV La Piedad (there is also a cable service)
- Radio stations in FM and AM
- Newspapers - La Redaccion, Info Metropoli.
- Internet - Código Libre

== Notable people ==
Arts / Shows

- Ignacio Ortiz - Painter
- Josefina Baez- Poet
- Carlos Alvarado Lang - Engraver
- Juan Rodríguez Vega - Musician
- Jose M. Hernandez - Astronaut

Sports

- Yovani Gallardo - Baseball player - Milwaukee Brewers
- Hector Pulido - Soccer player, he was part of the national team and coach of Cruz Azul Club (finalist in season 1986–1987)
- Ramón Morales - Soccer player, he has been part of the national team and played in the World Cup 2002 in Korea-Japan
- Carlos Morales - Soccer player, he has been part of the national team
- Jorge Flores - Basketball Player - 1976 Summer Olympics for National Team

== Sports ==
In the city there are basketball and soccer (male and female) leagues, there are wrestling exhibitions, and the city has been the finish of the Ruta Mexico (cycling). There are two public sport centers, clubs with tennis courts, a lienzo charro, and the Juan N. Lopez stadium, and several taekwondo schools from different institutions.

Outside the city are the Alianza, Mercantil and Azteca clubs, where there are football fields and swimming pools.

La Piedad had a football team in Mexico's First Division in 1952-53 season, and again in 2001 Winter and 2002 Summer seasons.

Previously, C.F. La Piedad played in Ascenso MX.

== Transportation ==
La Piedad is located close to the border of three states, Michoacán, Guanajuato and Jalisco. There are three highways entering this city: Mexico highways 110, 39, and 90.

Highway 110 goes west and takes you to the towns of Yurécuaro, Tanhuato, Vista Hermosa, Briseñas y La Barca, and the free-toll route to Guadalajara. Highway 37 runs south of La Piedad to Zamora, this highway goes to the toll highway 15, which goes north-south, from Nogales to Mexico City. Highway 90 runs north of La Piedad to the town of Degollado and states of Guanajuato and Jalisco.

== Sister cities ==
La Piedad has one sister cities, as designated by Sister Cities International:

- (United States) Woodland, California, USA
