= Mohamed Essam =

Mohamed Essam may refer to:

- Mohamed Essam (Egyptian footballer) (born 1994)
- Mohammed Essam (Qatari footballer) (born 2000)
- Mohamed Essam (fencer) (born 1994), Egyptian fencer

== See also ==
- Mohamed Essam Khaled, Egyptian basketball player
