= Angel Padron =

Angel Padron may refer to:

- Angel Padrón (basketball)
- Ángel Padrón (baseball)
