= Anthony Barnett =

Anthony Barnett may refer to:

- Anthony Barnett (writer) (born 1942), British writer; Director of Charter 88, 1988–1995
- Anthony Barnett (poet), English poet and music historian
- Tony Barnett (born 1952), Australian basketball player

== See also ==
- Antony Barnett (born 1965), a British investigative journalist
