= Javier Guerra =

Javier Guerra may refer to:

- Javier Guerra (water polo) (born 1954), Mexican Olympic water polo player
- Javi Guerra (footballer, born 1982), Spanish football striker
- Javier Guerra (runner) (born 1983), Spanish long-distance runner
- Javy Guerra (baseball, born 1985), American professional baseball pitcher for the Washington Nationals
- Javy Guerra (baseball, born 1995), Panamanian professional baseball pitcher for the San Diego Padres
- Javi Guerra (footballer, born 2003), Spanish football midfielder for Valencia CF
