= Norihiko Kitahara =

Japanese basketball player (1954–2026)

Personal information
- Nationality: Japanese
- Born: 11 December 1954 Ina, Japan
- Died: 30 May 2026 (aged 71)

Sport
- Sport: Basketball
Medal record
Representing Japan
FIBA Asia Champions Cup
Silver medal – second place	1981 Hong Kong	NKK
Asian Games
Bronze medal – third place	1982 New Delhi	Japan
William Jones Cup
Bronze medal – third place	1986 Taipei	Team

Norihiko Kitahara (北原 憲彦, Kitahara Norihiko; 11 December 1954 – 30 May 2026) was a Japanese basketball player. He competed in the men's tournament at the 1976 Summer Olympics. Kitahara died on 30 May 2026, at the age of 71.
