= Archery at the 2025 Pacific Mini Games =

- Venue: Melekeok Baseball Field
- Dates: 1–3 July 2025
- Competitors: 33 from 6 nations

Archery at the 2025 Pacific Mini Games was held between 1 and 3 July 2025 at the Melekeok Baseball Field in Melekeok, Palau, and consisted of nien events.

== Participating nations ==
The nations competing at the 2025 Pacific Mini Games archery tournament were:

- Fiji (4)
- Palau (10) (Host)
- Samoa (1)
- Tahiti (4)
- Tonga (7)
- Vanuatu (7)

== Medalists ==
=== Recurve ===
Event	Gold	Silver	Bronze
Men's individual	Hans Jensen; Tonga	Jean-Pierre Winkelstroeter; Tahiti	Kavi Gounder; Fiji
Men's matchplay	Hans Jensen; Tonga	Jean-Pierre Winkelstroeter; Tahiti	Edward Kenic; Palau
Women's individual	Thais Pendu; Tahiti	Chaandvi Prasad; Fiji	Jil Walter; Samoa
Women's matchplay	Thais Pendu; Tahiti	Chaandvi Prasad; Fiji	Jil Walter; Samoa
Mixed team	Tahiti; Thais Pendu; Jean-Pierre Winkelstroeter	Tonga; Hans Jensen; Halamehi Tangulu	Palau; Melvira Kazuma; Christopher Ongrung

=== Compound ===
Event	Gold	Silver	Bronze
Men's individual	Arthur Demachy; Tahiti	Victory Pekipaki; Tonga	Patrick Nadan; Fiji
Men's matchplay	Arthur Demachy; Tahiti	Victory Pekipaki; Tonga	Esela Mounga; Tonga
Women's individual	Aurore Cottett; Tahiti	Luisa Pongi; Tonga	Ana Fifita; Tonga
Women's matchplay	Aurore Cottett; Tahiti	Luisa Pongi; Tonga	Ana Fifita; Tonga

== Medal table ==
* Host nation (Palau)

Rank	Nation	Gold	Silver	Bronze	Total
1	Tahiti	7	2	0	9
2	Tonga	2	5	3	10
3	Fiji	0	2	2	4
4	Palau*	0	0	2	2
4	Samoa	0	0	2	2
Totals (5 entries)		9	9	9	27

== See also ==
- Archery at the Pacific Games
- Archery at the 2023 Pacific Games
