= Archery at the 2019 Pacific Games =

- Venue: Faleata Sports Complex
- Location: Apia, Samoa
- Dates: 8–12 July 2019

Archery at the 2019 Pacific Games in Apia, Samoa was held on 8–12 July 2019. The tournament was played on the outdoor target archery range at the Faleata Sports Complex in Tuanaimato, and included both recurve and compound bow events. Medals were awarded in men's and women's individual contests as well as for mixed team competitions.

The Prime Minister of Samoa, Tuilaepa Malielegaoi, qualified for his nation's team and was a competitor for the host country in the compound bow discipline.

== Teams ==
The nations competing at the 2019 Pacific Games archery tournament were:

- Fiji
- New Caledonia
- New Zealand
- Norfolk Island
- Palau
- Papua New Guinea
- Samoa
- Solomon Islands
- Tahiti
- Tonga
- Vanuatu

World Archery Oceania also hosted a continental Olympic qualifying event for mixed team recurve that was held concurrently with the Pacific Games events. Australian archers competed at the Olympic qualifying event.

== Medal summary ==
=== Medal table ===
* Host nation (Samoa)

Rank	Nation	Gold	Silver	Bronze	Total
1	New Caledonia	4	4	4	12
2	Fiji	3	3	1	7
3	Samoa*	2	1	3	6
4	Tahiti	1	1	2	4
5	Tonga	0	1	0	1
Totals (5 entries)		10	10	10	30

=== Recurve ===
Event	Gold		Silver		Bronze		Ref
Men's full round	Rob Elder; Fiji	986	Jean-Pierre Winkelstroeter; Tahiti	964	Thiry Teng; Tahiti	955	
Women's full round	Jil Walter; Samoa	868	Isabelle Dussoll; New Caledonia	860	Isabelle Soero; New Caledonia	839	
Men's matchplay	Jean-Pierre Winkelstroeter; Tahiti		Rob Elder; Fiji		Thiry Teng; Tahiti		
Women's matchplay	Isabelle Dussoll; New Caledonia		Jil Walter; Samoa		Isabelle Soero; New Caledonia		
Mixed team matchplay	Samoa; Jil Walter; Mua'ausa Walter		Tonga; Mele Tuuakitau; Hans Arne Jensen		New Caledonia; Cecile Picot; Laurent Clerte		

=== Compound ===
Event	Gold		Silver		Bronze		Ref
Men's full round	Laurent Clerte; New Caledonia	1072	Henri Shiu; New Caledonia	1065	Frederick Leota; Fiji	1056	
Women's full round	Cecille Rouillard; New Caledonia	1010	Lisa Leota; Fiji	935	Naifoua Vise Timai; Samoa	918	
Men's matchplay	Frederick Leota; Fiji		Laurent Clerte; New Caledonia		Henri Shiu; New Caledonia		
Women's matchplay	Cecille Rouillard; New Caledonia		Lisa Leota; Fiji		Naifoua Vise Timai; Samoa		
Mixed team matchplay	Fiji; Lisa Leota; Frederick Leota		New Caledonia; Isabelle Dussoll; Laurent Clerte		Samoa; Naifoua Vise Timai; Mathew Tauiliili		

== See also ==
- Archery at the Pacific Games
