= Martinov (surname) =

Martinov is a Slavic patronymic surname meaning "son of Martin" – and may refer to:

- Anatoly Martinov, Soviet flatwater canoeist
- Emil Martinov (1992), Bulgarian footballer
- Ivan Martinov (1771–1833), Russian botanist and philologist
- Martin Martinov (1950), Bulgarian former cyclist
- Zlatoje Martinov (1953), Serbian publicist and writer
