= Cycling at the 1976 Summer Olympics – Men's individual road race =

Men's cycling road race at the Games of the XXI Olympiad
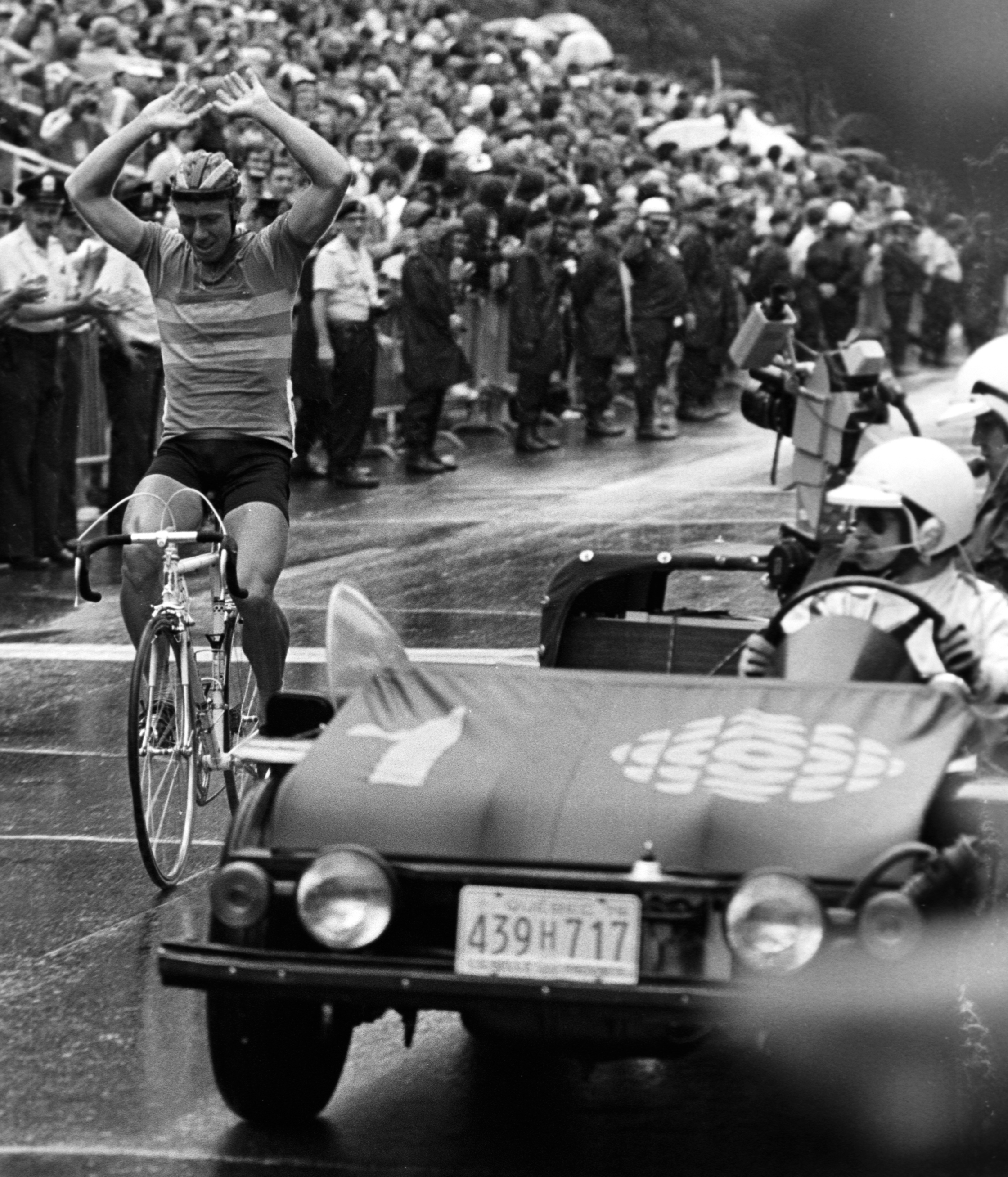
- Bernt Johansson
- Venue: Montréal, Canada
- Date: 26 July 1976
- Competitors: 134 from 40 nations
- Winning time: 4:46:52

Medalists
| 1st place, gold medalist(s) | | Bernt Johansson; Sweden |
| 2nd place, silver medalist(s) | | Giuseppe Martinelli; Italy |
| 3rd place, bronze medalist(s) | | Mieczysław Nowicki; Poland |

The men's individual road race at the 1976 Summer Olympics in Montreal, Quebec, Canada, was held on 26 July 1976. There were 134 cyclists from 40 nations starting the race. The maximum number of cyclists per nation was four. Fifty-eight cyclists finished the race. The event was won by Bernt Johansson of Sweden, the nation's first victory in the men's individual road race. Giuseppe Martinelli put Italy back on the podium with his silver; the nation had won gold or silver at every Games from 1956 to 1968 but did not medal in 1972. Mieczysław Nowicki's bronze was Poland's first medal in the event.

== Background ==
This was the 10th appearance of the event, previously held in 1896 and then at every Summer Olympics since 1936. It replaced the individual time trial event that had been held from 1912 to 1932 (and which would be reintroduced alongside the road race in 1996). Ryszard Szurkowski of Poland was "probably" the favorite; he had won the 1973 world championship and placed second in 1974. Neither the 1974 nor 1975 world champions competed in Montreal.

Bolivia and Nicaragua each made their debut in the men's individual road race. Great Britain made its 10th appearance in the event, the only nation to have competed in each appearance to date.

== Competition format and course ==
The mass-start race was on a 177.49 kilometre course "over the hilly Mont-Royal Circuit".

== Schedule ==
All times are Eastern Daylight Time (UTC-4)

| Date | Time | Round |
|---|---|---|
| Monday, 26 July 1976 | 10:00 | Final |

== Results ==
The lead pack of 10 riders got clear during lap 6. Johansson broke away from the pack in the last lap for a clear win. In the final sprint by the remaining nine leaders, Thaler finished in front but was penalized for interfering with the other riders and demoted from second place to ninth (the back of the + 31" group, with Alfonsel falling behind the rest into 10th place).

| Rank | Cyclist | Nation | Time |
|---|---|---|---|
| 1st place, gold medalist(s) | Bernt Johansson | Sweden | 4:46:52.0 |
| 2nd place, silver medalist(s) | Giuseppe Martinelli | Italy | 4:47:23.0 |
| 3rd place, bronze medalist(s) | Mieczysław Nowicki | Poland | s.t. |
| 4 | Alfons De Wolf | Belgium | s.t. |
| 5 | Nikolay Gorelov | Soviet Union | s.t. |
| 6 | George Mount | United States | s.t. |
| 7 | Jean-René Bernaudeau | France | s.t. |
| 8 | Vittorio Algeri | Italy | s.t. |
| 9 | Klaus-Peter Thaler | West Germany | s.t. |
| 10 | Bernardo Alfonsel | Spain | 4:47:27.0 |
| 11 | Stanisław Szozda | Poland | 4:49:01.0 |
| 12 | Ryszard Szurkowski | Poland | s.t. |
| 13 | Vlastimil Moravec | Czechoslovakia | s.t. |
| 14 | Carlos Cardet | Cuba | s.t. |
| 15 | Garry Bell | New Zealand | s.t. |
| 16 | Karl-Dietrich Diers | East Germany | s.t. |
| 17 | Aleksandr Averin | Soviet Union | s.t. |
| 18 | Herbert Spindler | Austria | s.t. |
| 19 | Wilfried Trott | West Germany | s.t. |
| 20 | Harry Hannus | Finland | s.t. |
| 21 | Roman Humenberger | Austria | s.t. |
| 22 | Álvaro Pachón | Colombia | s.t. |
| 23 | Luis Manrique | Colombia | s.t. |
| 24 | Pierre Harvey | Canada | s.t. |
| 25 | Arie Hassink | Netherlands | s.t. |
| 26 | Roberto Ceruti | Italy | s.t. |
| 27 | Wolfgang Steinmayr | Austria | s.t. |
| 28 | Clyde Sefton | Australia | s.t. |
| 29 | Sven-Åke Nilsson | Sweden | s.t. |
| 30 | Jan Brzeźny | Poland | s.t. |
| 31 | Carmelo Barone | Italy | s.t. |
| 32 | Rafael Ladrón | Spain | s.t. |
| 33 | Juan José Moral | Spain | s.t. |
| 34 | Remo Sansonetti | Australia | s.t. |
| 35 | Joseph Waugh | Great Britain | s.t. |
| 36 | Frank Hoste | Belgium | s.t. |
| 37 | Hans-Peter Jakst | West Germany | s.t. |
| 38 | Thorleif Andresen | Norway | s.t. |
| 39 | Valery Chaplygin | Soviet Union | s.t. |
| 40 | Leo van Vliet | Netherlands | s.t. |
| 41 | Petr Bucháček | Czechoslovakia | 4:54:26.0 |
| 42 | John Howard | United States | s.t. |
| 43 | Dudley Hayton | Great Britain | s.t. |
| 44 | Aavo Pikkuus | Soviet Union | 4:54:49.0 |
| 45 | Rubén Camacho | Mexico | s.t. |
| 46 | Peter Weibel | West Germany | s.t. |
| 47 | Dirk Heirweg | Belgium | 4:55:41.0 |
| 48 | Eddy Schepers | Belgium | s.t. |
| 49 | Stoyan Bobekov | Bulgaria | 4:58:35.0 |
| 50 | Ad Tak | Netherlands | 5:00:19.0 |
| 51 | Rudolf Mitteregger | Austria | s.t. |
| 52 | Vern Hanaray | New Zealand | s.t. |
| 53 | Ramón Noriega | Venezuela | 5:03:13.0 |
| 54 | Gilles Durand | Canada | s.t. |
| 55 | Geir Digerud | Norway | 5:04:42.0 |
| 56 | David Boll | United States | 5:05:00.0 |
| 57 | Richard Trinkler | Switzerland | s.t. |
| 58 | José Ollarves | Venezuela | 5:07:09.0 |
| — | Juan Carlos Haedo | Argentina | DNF |
| — | Osvaldo Benvenuti | Argentina | DNF |
| — | Oswaldo Frossasco | Argentina | DNF |
| — | Raúl Labbate | Argentina | DNF |
| — | Alan Goodrope | Australia | DNF |
| — | Peter Kesting | Australia | DNF |
| — | Marco Soria | Bolivia | DNF |
| — | Ivan Popov | Bulgaria | DNF |
| — | Martin Martinov | Bulgaria | DNF |
| — | Nedyalko Stoyanov | Bulgaria | DNF |
| — | Tom Morris | Canada | DNF |
| — | Brian Chewter | Canada | DNF |
| — | Miguel Samacá | Colombia | DNF |
| — | Abelardo Ríos | Colombia | DNF |
| — | Carlos Alvarado Reyes | Costa Rica | DNF |
| — | Roberto Menéndez | Cuba | DNF |
| — | Gregorio Aldo Arencibia | Cuba | DNF |
| — | Jorge Pérez | Cuba | DNF |
| — | Petr Matoušek | Czechoslovakia | DNF |
| — | Vladimír Vondráček | Czechoslovakia | DNF |
| — | Verner Blaudzun | Denmark | DNF |
| — | Jørgen Emil Hansen | Denmark | DNF |
| — | Bent Pedersen | Denmark | DNF |
| — | Willy Skibby | Denmark | DNF |
| — | Gerhard Lauke | East Germany | DNF |
| — | Hans-Joachim Hartnick | East Germany | DNF |
| — | Siegbert Schmeisser | East Germany | DNF |
| — | René Bittinger | France | DNF |
| — | Francis Duteil | France | DNF |
| — | Christian Jourdan | France | DNF |
| — | Philip Griffiths | Great Britain | DNF |
| — | William Nickson | Great Britain | DNF |
| — | Mikhail Kountras | Greece | DNF |
| — | Kwong Chi Yan | Hong Kong | DNF |
| — | Chan Fai Lui | Hong Kong | DNF |
| — | Tang Kam Man | Hong Kong | DNF |
| — | Chan Lam Hams | Hong Kong | DNF |
| — | Mohamed Ali Acha-Cheloi | Iran | DNF |
| — | Hassan Arianfard | Iran | DNF |
| — | Asghar Khodayari | Iran | DNF |
| — | Mahmoud Delshad | Iran | DNF |
| — | Alan McCormack | Ireland | DNF |
| — | Oliver McQuaid | Ireland | DNF |
| — | Errol Walters | Jamaica | DNF |
| — | Lucien Didier | Luxembourg | DNF |
| — | Marcel Thull | Luxembourg | DNF |
| — | Yahya Ahmad | Malaysia | DNF |
| — | Luis Rosendo Ramos | Mexico | DNF |
| — | José Castañeda | Mexico | DNF |
| — | Rodolfo Vitela | Mexico | DNF |
| — | Miguel Espinoza | Nicaragua | DNF |
| — | David Iornos | Nicaragua | DNF |
| — | Hamblin González | Nicaragua | DNF |
| — | Manuel Largaespada | Nicaragua | DNF |
| — | Frits Schür | Netherlands | DNF |
| — | Jamie Richards | New Zealand | DNF |
| — | Pål Henning Hansen | Norway | DNF |
| — | Stein Bråthen | Norway | DNF |
| — | Daniele Cesaretti | San Marino | DNF |
| — | Paulino Martínez | Spain | DNF |
| — | Leif Hansson | Sweden | DNF |
| — | Alf Segersäll | Sweden | DNF |
| — | Hansjörg Aemisegger | Switzerland | DNF |
| — | Robert Thalmann | Switzerland | DNF |
| — | Serge Demierre | Switzerland | DNF |
| — | Panya Singprayool-Dinmuong | Thailand | DNF |
| — | Chartchai Juntrat | Thailand | DNF |
| — | Prajin Rungrote | Thailand | DNF |
| — | Arlee Wararong | Thailand | DNF |
| — | Michael Neel | United States | DNF |
| — | Carlos Alcantara | Uruguay | DNF |
| — | Víctor González | Uruguay | DNF |
| — | Waldemar Pedrazzi | Uruguay | DNF |
| — | Washington Díaz | Uruguay | DNF |
| — | Justo Galaviz | Venezuela | DNF |
| — | Nicolas Reidtler | Venezuela | DNF |
