= Kuwata =

Kuwata (桑田 characters for "Morus" and "Paddy field") is a Japanese surname. Notable people with the surname include:

- Jiro Kuwata (1935–2020), Japanese manga artist
- Keisuke Kuwata (born 1956), Japanese singer
- Kiyohide Kuwata (桑田 健秀, born 1953), Japanese basketball player
- Masumi Kuwata (born 1968), Japanese baseball player
- Matt Kuwata (born 1994), Japanese model, media personality, and musician

== Fictional characters ==
- Leon Kuwata, a character from the visual novel Danganronpa: Trigger Happy Havoc
