= Kesting =

Kesting is a surname. Notable people with the surname include:

- Edmund Kesting (1892–1970), German photographer, painter and art professor
- Hans Kesting (born 1960), Dutch actor
- Jürgen Kesting (1940–2026), German journalist, music critic and author
- Mat Kesting, CEO and director of the Adelaide Film Festival since 2019
- Peter Kesting (born 1955), Australian former cyclist
- Sheilagh Kesting (born 1953), Scottish Presbyterian of Church of Scotland
