= Hamaguchi =

Hamaguchi (written: 浜口 or 濱口) is a Japanese surname. Notable people with the surname include:

- Hideki Hamaguchi (浜口 秀樹; born 1956), Japanese basketball player
- Honoo Hamaguchi (浜口 炎; born 1971), Japanese basketball coach
- Kanari Hamaguchi (濱口 華菜里; born 1985), Japanese volleyball player
- Mark Hamaguchi (浜口マーク; born 1982), Japanese skate boarder, invented the bicycle trick; "Ninja brakes", a dismount technique, running out of a bicycle at its top speed
- Masaru Hamaguchi (濱口 優; born 1972), Japanese comedian
- Hamaguchi Osachi (濱口 雄幸; 1870 – 1931), 27th Prime Minister of Japan
- Ryusuke Hamaguchi (濱口 竜介; born 1978), Japanese film director and screenwriter
- Shirō Hamaguchi (浜口 史郎; born 1969), Japanese anime composer
- Sota Hamaguchi (濱口 草太; born 1999), Japanese footballer
- Toshiyuki Hamaguchi (浜口 俊之; born 1970), Japanese motorcycle racer
- Yoshihiro Hamaguchi (浜口 喜博; 1926–2011), Japanese freestyle swimmer
