= Terry Reilly =

Australian archer (1947–2025)

Personal information
- Nationality: Australian
- Born: 24 October 1947
- Died: 21 March 2025 (aged 77)

Sport
- Sport: Archery

Terrence Reilly (24 October 1947 – 21 March 2025) was an Australian archer who competed at the 1972 Summer Olympics and the 1976 Summer Olympics.

Reilly began his archery career in 1960 at the Adelaide Archery Club. He won his first State open age event when he was 17 years old. Over his career, he won eight National titles, including four Target Championships, three Field Championships, and one Clout Championship. He earned the Best All Round Archer Award in 1977. He was part of the winning team at the 1975 Monaco Cup.

Reilly was honored with numerous awards, including Archery Australia's Silver Plaquette in 1993, Archery Australia's Gold Plaquette in 2000, and the FITA Silver Plaquette in 2001.

He managed the FITA office in Lausanne from 2002 to 2005 and was chief executive officer of Archery Australia. He also was chief executive officer of Yachting SA and as a board member of Sport SA. He coached Australian Paralympic athletes such as Libby Kosmala and Natalie Cordowiner.

Reilly died from cancer on 21 March 2025, at the age of 77.
