= Yahya Ahmad (cyclist) =

Malaysian cyclist (born 1954)

Personal information
- Born: 7 August 1954 (age 72)

Cycling career
- Sport: Cycling

Yahya Ahmad (born 7 August 1954) is a Malaysian former cyclist. He competed in the individual road race event at the 1976 Summer Olympics, but did not finish.
