= Naifoua Vise Timai =

Samoan archer

Sport
- Country: Samoa
- Sport: Archery
Medal record
Women's Archery
Representing Samoa
Pacific Games
Bronze medal – third place	2019 Apia	compound
Bronze medal – third place	2019 Apia	compound matchplay
Bronze medal – third place	2019 Apia	compound mixed team

Naifoua Vise Timai is a Samoan archer who has represented Samoa at the Pacific Games.

Timai is from Gataivai on the island of Savaiʻi.

At the 2019 Pacific Games in Apia she won a bronze medal in the women's compound, compound matchplay, and (alongside Mathew Tauiliili) the mixed team compound.
