= Oliver McQuaid =

Irish cyclist

Personal information
- Full name: Oliver McQuaid
- Nickname: Ollie
- Born: 10 July 1954 (age 72) Dublin, Ireland
- Height: 172 cm (5 ft 8 in)
- Weight: 67 kg (148 lb)

Cycling career
- Sport: Cycling

Amateur team

Oliver McQuaid (born 10 July 1954) is an Irish former cyclist. He competed in the individual road race event at the 1976 Summer Olympics.
