= Pål Henning Hansen =

Norwegian cyclist

Personal information
- Born: 16 May 1953 (age 73) Kongsberg, Norway

Cycling career
- Sport: Cycling

Pål Henning Hansen (born 16 May 1953) is a Norwegian former cyclist. He competed in the individual road race event at the 1976 Summer Olympics.
