= Kiyohide Kuwata =

Japanese basketball player

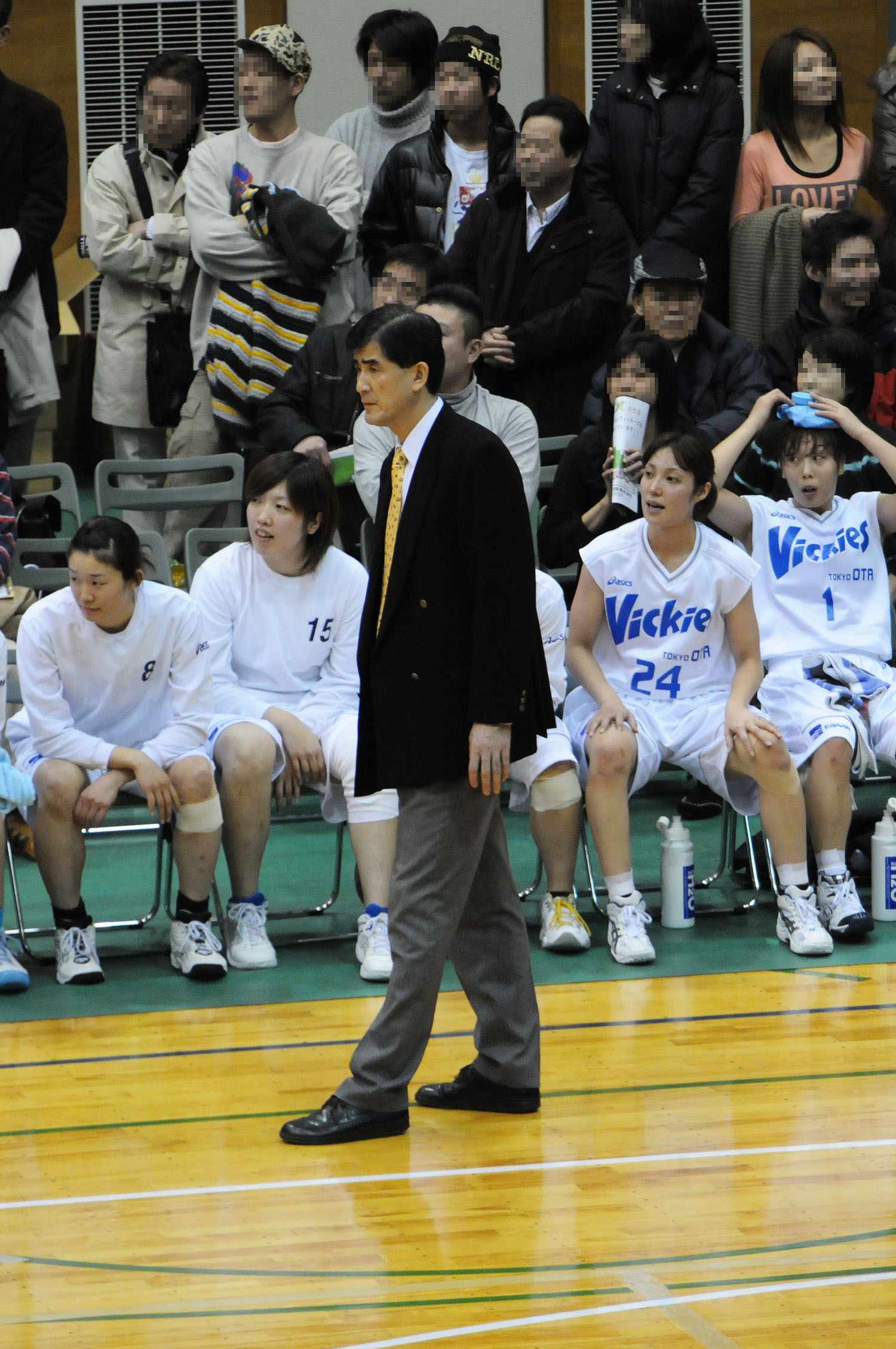
- Kiyohide Kuwata in 2009

Personal information
- Nationality: Japanese
- Born: 3 January 1953 (age 73) Tokyo, Japan

Sport
- Sport: Basketball
Medal record
Men's basketball
Representing Japan
FIBA Asia Champions Cup
Silver medal – second place	1981 Hong Kong	NKK

Kiyohide Kuwata (桑田 健秀, Kuwata Kiyohide; born 3 January 1953) is a Japanese basketball player. He competed in the men's tournament at the 1976 Summer Olympics, which marked his only Olympic appearance. Japan's team finished in 11th place in the competition.
