= La Piedad Institute of Technology =

Coordinates: 20.3654°N 102.0433°W

Instituto Tecnológico de La Piedad
- Motto: Con la ciencia y la tecnologia, hacia nuestro ideal (With the science and technology, towards our ideal)
- Type: Public university
- Established: 1990
- President: Juan Manuel Salazar Chávez
- Students: 1000 (approx.)
- Location: La Piedad, Michoacán de Ocampo, Mexico
- Campus: Avenida Tecnológico 2000 Meseta de Los Laureles Col. Plateau de los Laureles 59370
- Colors: Blue and yellow
- Nickname: Eaglets
- Website: www.itlapiedad.edu.mx

The La Piedad Institute of Technology is a public university located in La Piedad, Michoacán, Mexico. It was founded in 1990. It is part of the Mexican public education system (SEP) and offers training for several careers. English is taught as a second language at the school.

== History ==
In 1990 the institute started operations in the buildings of another college, Centro de Bachillerato Tecnológico Industrial y de servicios No. 84, with programmes in Industrial Engineering, Business Administration, Computer Systems Engineering and Informatics.

Several years later it added a course of study for Electronics Engineering. Throughout its 17-year history, students at Tec La Piedad have several times won firsts, seconds and third place prizes at creativity contests, amongst institutes of technology from around the country.

The university has been the venue of regional sports tournaments, where the students took part in basketball, tennis, and soccer.

== Academics ==
The institute offers a variety of degree programs:

- Electronic Engineering
- Industrial Engineering
- Business Administration
- Computer Systems Engineering
- Informatics

== Featured Engineers ==
- Ing. Miguel Angel Vázquez Jiménez
- Ing. Ociel García Padilla

== Research publications ==
Below is a list of published research papers produced by PhD students at the school.

- Measurement of the non-isothermal cavity temperature distribution of a pyrolytic graphite high temperature blackbody radiator
- Corrections of size-of-source effect and distance effect in radiometric measurements of radiance
- An embedded language approach to router specification in Curry
- An Embedded Language Approach to Router Specification in Curry (Book ISBN 978-3-540-20779-5)
- Numerical calculation of the Fresnel diffraction patterns for periodic objects in measurements with a two-aperture radiometer
- Hardness measurements of metals with the complex refractive index
- Mathematics I. Differential Calculation (in Spanish)
