= Arne Jensen (archer) =

Tongan archer (born 1998)

Personal information
- Full name: Hans Arne Jensen
- Born: 25 February 1998 (age 28) Nuku'alofa, Tonga
- Height: 1.81 m (5 ft 11 in)
- Weight: 95 kg (209 lb)

Sport
- Country: Tonga
- Sport: Archery
- Event: Recurve
- Coached by: Benjamin Ipsen
Medal record
Men's Archery
Representing Tonga
Pacific Games
Gold medal – first place	2025 Palau	Men's individual
Gold medal – first place	2025 Palau	Men's matchplay
Silver medal – second place	2019 Apia	Recurve mixed matchplay
- Updated on 24 February 2017

Hans Arne Jensen (born 25 February 1998) is a Tongan competitive archer. Representing his nation Tonga at the 2015 World Championships and at the 2016 Summer Olympics, Jensen trained under the tutelage of his Danish father and head coach Hans Jensen.

At the 2016 Summer Olympics in Rio de Janeiro, Jensen became the first Tongan archer to compete in an Olympic tournament after 12 years, shooting only in the men's individual recurve. Jensen scored 604 points out of a possible 720 to take the sixty-first seed from a field of 64 archers in the qualifying round, before he faced his initial challenge against the eventual fourth-place finalist and world-ranked Dutch archer Sjef van den Berg, abruptly ending his Olympic debut in a dramatic 3–7 defeat.

In March 2019, while training for the Pacific Games, he broke Tonga's national archery record twice within a month.

In May 2024 he was elected president of World Archery Oceania.

He won two gold medals at the 2025 Pacific Mini Games in Palau.
