= Mathew Tauiliili =

Samoan archer

Personal information
- Born: Lotoso’a Saleimoa

Sport
- Country: Samoa
- Sport: Archery
Medal record
Men's Archery
Representing Samoa
Pacific Games
Bronze medal – third place	2019 Apia	compound mixed team

Matthew Levi Tauiliili (born ~2002) is a Samoan archer who has represented Samoa at the Pacific Games.

Tauiliili is from Lotoso’a Saleimoa on the island of Upolu.

At the 2019 Pacific Games in Apia he won a bronze medal (alongside Naifoua Vise Timai) in the mixed team compound after Samoan Prime Minister Tuila'epa Sa'ilele Malielegaoi withdrew to give him a place in the final.
