= Errol Walters =

Jamaican cyclist (born 1956)

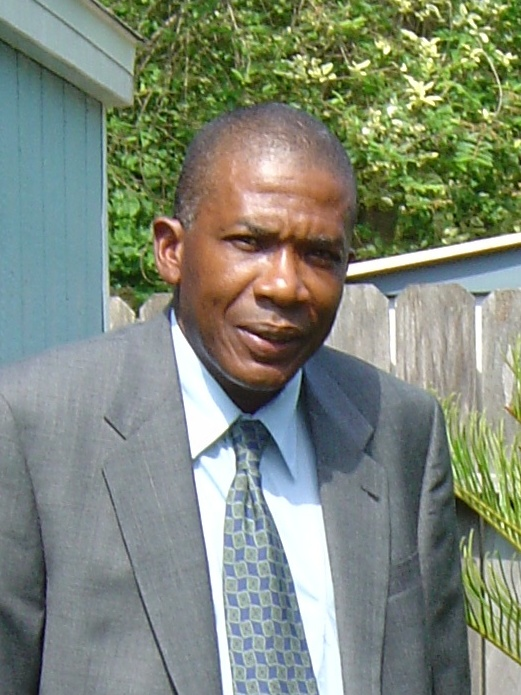

Personal information
- Born: 26 July 1956 (age 70)

Cycling career
- Sport: Cycling

Errol Walters (born 26 July 1956) is a Jamaican former cyclist. He competed in the individual road race event at the 1976 Summer Olympics.
