= Willy Skibby =

Danish cyclist

Personal information
- Born: 20 February 1942 (age 84) Skanderborg, Denmark

Cycling career
- Sport: Cycling

Willy Skibby (born 20 February 1942) is a Danish former cyclist. Skibby was born in Copenhagen and his profession was a car mechanic. His sporting career began with D:C:R: Copenhagen. He competed in the individual road race event at the 1976 Summer Olympics.
