= 2017 Pacific Mini Games =

Multi-sport event in Port Vila, Vanuatu

X Pacific Mini Games
- Host city: Port Vila, Vanuatu
- Motto: One Ocean, One People
- Nations: 24
- Athletes: 2000
- Events: 172 in 14 sports
- Opening: 4 December
- Closing: 15 December
- Opened by: Tallis Obed Moses
- Main venue: Korman Stadium

The 2017 Pacific Mini Games were held in Port Vila, Vanuatu, in December 2017. It was the tenth edition of the Pacific Mini Games, and the second to be hosted in Vanuatu (after the 1993 games).

== Host selection ==
Vanuatu was awarded the right to host the games at a September 2011 meeting of the Pacific Games Council's General Assembly. Nauru and the Northern Mariana Islands were the other countries to bid. The event was originally planned for September 2017 but preparations were delayed by Cyclone Pam.

Both rounds of voting took place on the 4 September 2011 with Nauru eliminated after the first round. In the final round, Vanuatu edged Northern Mariana Islands by 4 votes to earn hosting rights.

2017 Pacific Mini Games bidding results
City	Country	Round 1	Round 2
Port Vila	Vanuatu	8	13
Saipan	Northern Mariana Islands	8	9
Yaren	Nauru	6	—

== Venues ==
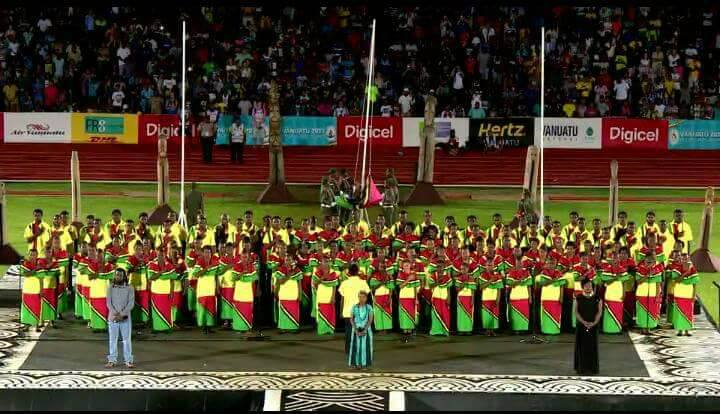
Choir at the opening ceremony of the 2017 Pacific Mini Games in Port Vila.

- Korman Sports Complex
  - Archery field - Archery
  - Stadium - Athletics, Football, Rugby sevens, Opening and closing ceremonies
  - Indoor Hall 1 - Boxing, Table tennis
  - Indoor Hall 2 - Basketball 3×3, Judo, Karate, Netball
  - Beach Volleyball Courts - Beach Volleyball
  - Tennis courts - Tennis
- Mele Golf Course - Golf
- Port Vila Municipal Stadium - Football
- Epauto Adventist High School -Weightlifting

== Participating nations ==
There were 24 national teams that competed at the games:

- American Samoa
- Australia
- Cook Islands
- Fiji
- Guam
- Kiribati
- Marshall Islands
- Federated States of Micronesia
- New Caledonia
- New Zealand
- Nauru
- Niue
- Norfolk Island
- Northern Mariana Islands
- Palau
- Papua New Guinea
- Samoa
- Solomon Islands
- Tokelau
- Tonga
- Tuvalu
- Vanuatu
- Wallis and Futuna
- Independent PGC athletes ^{*}

== Medal table ==
The final medal tally for the 2017 Pacific Mini Games.

* Host nation (Vanuatu)

Rank	Nation	Gold	Silver	Bronze	Total
1	New Caledonia	46	16	20	82
2	Papua New Guinea	32	32	21	85
3	Fiji	23	31	24	78
4	Vanuatu*	22	26	27	75
5	Samoa	20	16	10	46
6	Solomon Islands	8	11	18	37
7	Tonga	4	4	12	20
8	Cook Islands	4	4	5	13
9	Kiribati	3	5	4	12
10	Marshall Islands	3	0	0	3
11	New Zealand	2	7	0	9
12	Wallis and Futuna	2	3	3	8
13	Independent PGC athletes^{*}	2	1	0	3
14	Nauru	1	9	15	25
15	Guam	0	1	1	2
15	Tuvalu	0	1	1	2
17	Australia	0	0	2	2
18	American Samoa	0	0	1	1
18	Northern Mariana Islands	0	0	1	1
18	Tokelau	0	0	1	1
Totals (20 entries)		172	167	166	505

== Sports ==
Fourteen sports were hosted:

- 3-on-3 basketball (2)
- Archery (6)
- Athletics (47) ^{a}
- Beach volleyball (2)
- Boxing (10)
- Football (2)
- Golf (4)
- Judo (15)
- Karate (16)
- Netball (1)
- Rugby sevens (1)
- Table tennis (11) ^{b}
- Tennis (7)
- Weightlifting (48)
Note: A number in parentheses indicates the number of medal events that were contested in each sport, where known.

=== Archery ===
Event	Gold	Silver	Bronze
Men's individual recurve	Rob Elder; Fiji	Danick Aisik; Vanuatu	Arne Jansen; Tonga
Women's individual recurve	Isabelle Vermande; New Caledonia	Jil Grete Walter; Samoa	Isabelle Soero; New Caledonia
Mixed team recurve	New Caledonia; Denis Moedjijo; Isabelle Soero	Samoa; Joseph Walter; Jil Grete Walter	Tonga; Arne Jansen; Karoline Tatafu
Men's individual compound	Henry Shiu; New Caledonia	Frederick Leota; Fiji	Xavier Mangoen; New Caledonia
Women's individual compound	Cecile Picot; New Caledonia	Lisa Leota; Fiji	
Mixed team compound	New Caledonia; Henry Shiu; Cecile Picot	Fiji; Lisa Leota; Frederick Leota	

=== Boxing ===
Event	Gold	Silver	Bronze
Light flyweight 49 kg	Namry Berry; Vanuatu	Tetekana Clinton; Solomon Islands	
Flyweight; 52 kg	Kalai Gill; Vanuatu	Keama Charkes Feama; Papua New Guinea	Mika Alex; Solomon Islands
Bantamweight; 56 kg	Warawara Boe; Vanuatu	Cook Yachen; Nauru	Noki Beupu; Papua New Guinea
Bantamweight; 56 kg	Warawara Boe; Vanuatu	Cook Yachen; Nauru	Iiaha Denis Moses; Solomon Islands
Lightweight; 60 kg	Nu'uuli Mose; Samoa	Silas Johnny; Vanuatu	Oaike Allan Aukoae; Papua New Guinea
Lightweight; 60 kg	Nu'uuli Mose; Samoa	Silas Johnny; Vanuatu	Kia Henry; Solomon Islands
Light welterweight 64 kg	Sere Roy; Vanuatu	Ume John; Papua New Guinea	Babanisi Gerrard; Solomon Islands
Light welterweight 64 kg	Sere Roy; Vanuatu	Ume John; Papua New Guinea	Davule Jone; Fiji
Welterweight; 69 kg	Moleni John Barry Slade; Tonga	Aisaga Andrew Kape; Papua New Guinea	Hill Winston; Fiji
Welterweight; 69 kg	Moleni John Barry Slade; Tonga	Aisaga Andrew Kape; Papua New Guinea	Fandaux Than Guy; New Caledonia
Middleweight; 75 kg	Sivas Lui; Vanuatu	Sua Ropati; Samoa	Kometa Andrew; Kiribati
Middleweight; 75 kg	Sivas Lui; Vanuatu	Sua Ropati; Samoa	Drayton Sabastien; New Caledonia
Light heavyweight 81 kg	Henry Tyrell; Samoa	Jubiely Torea; Independent PGC athletes	Waritam Robert Zorro; Vanuatu
Light heavyweight 81 kg	Henry Tyrell; Samoa	Jubiely Torea; Independent PGC athletes	Tameifuna Mercy Sione; Tonga
Heavyweight; 91 kg	Heimata Neuffer; Independent PGC athletes	Peneueta John; Samoa	Missak Tuk; Vanuatu
Heavyweight; 91 kg	Heimata Neuffer; Independent PGC athletes	Peneueta John; Samoa	Kami Talamoni Clayton; Tonga
Super heavyweight +91 kg	Atiu Amoroa; Independent PGC athletes	Robin Peter; Vanuatu	Aukoso Faamanu; Samoa
Super heavyweight +91 kg	Atiu Amoroa; Independent PGC athletes	Robin Peter; Vanuatu	Tusamoa Jean; New Caledonia

=== Golf ===
Event	Gold	Silver	Bronze
Men's individual	Guillaume Castagne; New Caledonia	Abid Hussain; Fiji	Morgan Annato; Papua New Guinea
Women's individual	Emillie Ricaud; New Caledonia	Rotana Howard; Cook Islands	Mathilde Guepy; New Caledonia
Men's team	New Caledonia; Guillaume Castagne; Morgan Dufour; Anthony Cuer; Norman Bonnet	Papua New Guinea; Morgan Annato; Vagi James; Philip Mek; Justin Brunskill	Fiji; Abid Hussain; Olaf Allen; Won Hwang; Ryan Kumar
Women's team	New Caledonia; Emillie Ricaud; Mathilde Guepy; Maiwen Delamarie-le Blevic; Ines Lavelua	Papua New Guinea; Kristine Seko; Wari Winchcombe; Natalie Mok; Danae Clamp	Fiji; Merelita McCarthy; Jee Dawi; Raina Kumar; Ufemia Naisara

=== Judo ===
Event	Gold	Silver	Bronze
Men's 60 kg	Tony Lomo; Solomon Islands	Charles Cure; New Caledonia	Loic Michel Nasse; Vanuatu
Men's 66 kg	Kaieura Kip; Nauru	Joe Mahit; Vanuatu	Claude Kalo; Vanuatu
Men's 66 kg	Kaieura Kip; Nauru	Joe Mahit; Vanuatu	Ugo Langois; New Caledonia
Men's 73 kg	Vincent Neris; New Caledonia	Tom Willie; Vanuatu	Ilai Ualesi Elekana Manu; Tokelau
Men's 81 kg	William Fayard; New Caledonia	Vincent Burani; New Caledonia	Pandabela Lesley; Solomon Islands
Men's 90 kg	Teva Gouriou; New Caledonia	Ovini Uera; Nauru	Nicolas Monvoisin; Vanuatu
Men's 90 kg	Teva Gouriou; New Caledonia	Ovini Uera; Nauru	Feao Fakaosi; Tonga
Men's 100 kg	David Put; New Caledonia	not awarded	not awarded
Men's +100 kg	Finetuui Moala; Tonga	Sailosi Fua Ealelei; Tonga	Nazario Martin Fiakaifonu; Vanuatu
Men's open lightweight	Vincent Neris; New Caledonia	Ugo Langois; New Caledonia	Kaierua Kip; Nauru
Men's open lightweight	Vincent Neris; New Caledonia	Ugo Langois; New Caledonia	Charles Cure; New Caledonia
Men's open heavyweight	Teva Gouriou; New Caledonia	Sailosi Fua Ealelei; Tonga	William Fayard; New Caledonia
Men's open heavyweight	Teva Gouriou; New Caledonia	Sailosi Fua Ealelei; Tonga	Finetuui Moala; Tonga
Women's 52 kg	Chloe Omo-Perraut; New Caledonia	not awarded	not awarded
Women's 57 kg	Jaycee Brival; New Caledonia	not awarded	not awarded
Women's 63 kg	Camille Geniau; New Caledonia	Nathalyn Takayawa; Fiji	Emeline Kaddour; New Caledonia
Women's 70 kg	Shanice Takayawa; Fiji	not awarded	not awarded
Women's open lightweight	Jaycee Brival; New Caledonia	Chloe Omo-Perraut; New Caledonia	not awarded
Women's open heavyweight	Shanice Takayawa; Fiji	Emeline Kaddour; New Caledonia	Aykesa Atuvaha; New Caledonia
Women's open heavyweight	Shanice Takayawa; Fiji	Emeline Kaddour; New Caledonia	Esther Dumons; New Caledonia

=== Karate ===
==== Kata ====
Event	Gold	Silver	Bronze
Men's individual	Vu Duc Minh Dack; New Caledonia	Tumu Lango; Vanuatu	not awarded
Women's individual	Laura Rothery; New Caledonia	Vamule Vassy Mata Lango; Vanuatu	Crystal Elizabeth Raka Mari; Papua New Guinea
Men's team	New Caledonia; Vu Duc Minh Dack; Jean Emmanuel Faure; Kevyn Pognon	Vanuatu; Tumu Lango; Trevor Naieu; Freddy Wilson	not awarded
Women's team	New Caledonia; Angelique Mondoloni; Laura Rothery; Juliette Schmidt	Vanuatu; Vamule Vassy Mata Lango; Winona Lango; Augustine Yalou	not awarded

==== Kumite ====
Event	Gold	Silver	Bronze
Men's 60 kg	Jaremy Di Matteo; New Caledonia	Joshua Iauko; Vanuatu	Everest Foetaa Ega; Solomon Islands
Men's 60 kg	Jaremy Di Matteo; New Caledonia	Joshua Iauko; Vanuatu	Nigel Bana; Papua New Guinea
Men's 67 kg	Jean-Emmanuel Faure; New Caledonia	Paul Henry Iauko; Vanuatu	Frengy Bisoka; Solomon Islands
Men's 75 kg	Philippe Annonier; New Caledonia	Jasper Samo; Solomon Islands	Tumu Lango; Vanuatu
Men's 84 kg	Stephane Breton; Vanuatu	Vincent Quentin Bougen; Papua New Guinea	Dylan Agamalu; New Caledonia
Men's 84 kg	Stephane Breton; Vanuatu	Vincent Quentin Bougen; Papua New Guinea	Siosi Tafoa Junior; Solomon Islands
Men's +84 kg	Jonathan Dedieu; New Caledonia	Petelo Perkon Peato; Vanuatu	not awarded
Men's open	Iwe Rene Hmana; New Caledonia	Nigel Bana; Papua New Guinea	Siosi Tagoa Junior; Solomon Islands
Men's open	Iwe Rene Hmana; New Caledonia	Nigel Bana; Papua New Guinea	Trevor Naieu; Vanuatu
Men's team	New Caledonia; Dylan Agamalu; Mathieu Annonier; Philippe Annonier; Jonathan Dedieu; Jean-Emmanuel Faure; Lucien Haiu; Iwe Rene Hmana; Kevyn Pognon	Vanuatu; Petelo Perkon Peato; Tumu Lango; Cliford Bule; Reynold Noukout; Stephane Breton; Christopher Olule; Gely Robert Pakoa	Papua New Guinea; Cosmas Walihl Sallawali; Nigel Bana; Vincent Quentin Bougen
Men's team	New Caledonia; Dylan Agamalu; Mathieu Annonier; Philippe Annonier; Jonathan Dedieu; Jean-Emmanuel Faure; Lucien Haiu; Iwe Rene Hmana; Kevyn Pognon	Vanuatu; Petelo Perkon Peato; Tumu Lango; Cliford Bule; Reynold Noukout; Stephane Breton; Christopher Olule; Gely Robert Pakoa	Solomon Islands; Siosi Tafoa Junior; Kenihiria Rex; Jasper Samo; Frengy Bisoka; Everest Foetaa Ega
Women's 61 kg	Vamule Vassy Mata Lango; Vanuatu	Crystal Elizabeth Raka Mari; Papua New Guinea	not awarded
Women's 68 kg	Aurore Vaysset; New Caledonia	Augustine Yalou; Vanuatu	Janet Lydia Gwai; Solomon Islands
Women's +68 kg	Romina Rambans; New Caledonia	Lynn Tari; Vanuatu	not awarded
Women's open	Morane Vacher; New Caledonia	Crystal Elizabeth Raka Mari; Papua New Guinea	Winona Lango; Vanuatu
Women's team	New Caledonia; Romina Rambans; Morane Vacher; Aurore Vaysset	Vanuatu; Vamule Vassy Mata Lango; Winona Lango; Lynn Tari; Augustine Yalou	not awarded

=== Rugby sevens ===
Event	Gold	Silver	Bronze
Men	Samoa (SAM)	Fiji (FIJ)	Tonga (TGA)

== Calendar ==
The following table provides a summary of the competition schedule.

OC	Opening ceremony	●	Event competitions	●	Commonwealth Games qualifying	1	Event finals	CC	Closing ceremony

December 2017	2nd Sat	3rd Sun	4th Mon	5th Tue	6th Wed	7th Thu	8th Fri	9th Sat	10th Sun	11th Mon	12th Tue	13th Wed	14th Thu	15th Fri	Gold medals
Ceremonies			OC											CC	
3-on-3 basketball										●	●	●	2		2
Archery											●	2	4		6
Athletics										9	11	11	16		47
Beach volleyball					●	●	●			●	●	●	●	2	2
Boxing										●	●	●	●	10	10
Football	●		●	●	●	●	●	●		●	●	●	1	1	2
Golf					●	●	●	4							4
Judo				●	7	8									15
Karate							10	6							16
Netball												●	●	1	1
Rugby sevens							●	1							1
Table tennis			●	●	2	●	1	8							11
Tennis			●	●	●	2	●	●		●	●	3	2	●	7
Weightlifting				18	15	15									48
Total gold medals	0	0	0	18	24	25	11	19	0	9	11	16	25	14	172
Cumulative total	0	0	0	18	42	67	77	97	97	106	117	133	158	172	172

== Notes ==
^* No official Tahiti team took part in the 2017 Mini Games following the French Polynesian government's decision to boycott the event. A number of Tahitian athletes competed under the banner of the Pacific Games Council.

^a Athletics included four parasport events: men's 100m – ambulatory; men's javelin – ambulatory; men's shot put – seated; and women's shot put – ambulatory.

^b Table tennis to include four parasport events: men's/women's singles – seated; and men's/women's singles – ambulatory.

== Sources ==
- Charter - Constitution, Code of Conduct, Protocols, and Regulations adopted Apia, Samoa 14 May 2006 - As amended most recently in Wallis Island, 19 October 2012 (Report). Pacific Games Council. 2012. Archived from the original (PDF 0.3 MB) on 14 November 2012.
- Bid to host the Pacific Mini Games 2017 (PDF 6.0 MB) (Report). Government of the Republic of Vanuatu. 2011. Archived from the original on 9 July 2015.
