= Mua'ausa Walter =

Samoan archer

Personal information
- Born: December 15, 1961 (age 64)
- Height: 1.88 m (6 ft 2 in)
- Weight: 95 kg (209 lb)

Sport
- Country: Samoa
- Sport: Archery
Medal record
Men's Archery
Representing Samoa
Pacific Games
Gold medal – first place	2019 Apia	mixed team matchplay
Silver medal – second place	2007 Apia	mixed team matchplay
Bronze medal – third place	2007 Apia	recurve
Pacific Mini Games
Silver medal – second place	2017 Port Vila	mixed team matchplay

Mua'ausa Joseph Siegfried Walter (born December 15, 1961) is a Samoan archer. He was the first Samoan to compete in archery at the Olympic Games, and has also represented Samoa at the Commonwealth Games and Pacific Games. He is the father of Samoan archer Jil Walter. He is president of the Samoa Archery Federation.

== Career ==
Walter was educated at the University of Glamorgan in Wales, graduating with a master's degree in engineering. In 1998 he was appointed deputy general manager for the Samoa Electric Power Corporation, before becoming chief executive from 2003 to 2011. He later worked for the International Institute for Energy Conservation, and as a consultant. He serves on the council of the National University of Samoa, and as chair of the board of the Samoa Fire & Emergencies Services.

== 2008 Summer Olympics ==
At the 2008 Summer Olympics in Beijing Muaausa finished his ranking round with a total of 563 points, which gave him the 64th seed for the final competition bracket in which he faced first seed Juan René Serrano in the first round. Serrano won the match by 116-88 and Muaausa was eliminated. Serrano would lose the match for the bronze medal against Bair Badënov.

== 2010 Commonwealth Games ==
Walter represented Samoa at the 2010 Commonwealth Games in Delhi, but did not advance.

== Pacific Games ==
He represented Samoa at the 2007 South Pacific Games in Apia, winning silver (alongside Andrew Ah Liki and Tuala Oli Ah Him) in the team competition and bronze in the individual recurve.

At the 2017 Pacific Mini Games in Port Vila, Vanuatu, winning silver (alongside his daughter Jil Walter) in the mixed team recurve. He was paired with her again at the 2019 Pacific Games in Apia, this time winning gold.
