= Apcor Financiers =

- Leagues: MICAA
- Location: Philippines
- Head coach: Arturo Valenzona
- Championships: MICAA: 4x

The Apcor Financiers were a basketball club which played in the Manila Industrial and Commercial Athletic Association (MICAA).

== History ==
The Apcor Financiers entered the Manila Industrial and Commercial Athletic Association (MICAA) in 1980. Arturo Valenzona was the head coach and Apcor president Armand Santos was the team manage. They won the 1980 title at the YCO Painters defeating their opponents 2–1 in the finals series. They were the only fourth team to win a title in the MICAA which was established in 1938. They won the MICAA Invitationals in the same year.

For the last ever MICAA season in 1981. Apcor won the opening tournament at Crispa 400's expense. Their fourth title was won in the second tournament which ended in August 1981. Jag Jeans were the runner-up.

Apcor also took part at the inaugural Asian Basketball Club Championship in March 1981 in British Hong Kong and placed third. The team disbanded in 1982.

== Players ==
The following has played for the Apcor Financiers.

- Alex Amador
- Ramon Cruz
- Alex Clariño
- Arturo Cristobal
- Joselito Danggoy
- Florante de la Cruz
- Rudy Garcia
- Padim Israel
- Rey Lazaro
- Romeo Martin
- Allan Meimban
- Conrado Pasco
- Reynaldo Ramos
- Marte Saldaña
- Carlson Samlani
- Elpidio Villamin

== Honors ==
=== Domestic ===
- MICAA
  - Champions (4) 1980–1981

=== International ===
- Asian Basketball Club Championship
  - Third place: 1981
