= Jorge Pérez (cyclist) =

Cuban cyclist

Personal information
- Born: 14 October 1951 (age 75) Guane, Cuba

Cycling career
- Sport: Cycling

Jorge Pérez (born 14 October 1951) is a Cuban former cyclist. He competed in the individual road race event at the 1976 Summer Olympics.
