= Mahmoud Delshad =

Iranian cyclist

Personal information
- Born: 25 March 1953 (age 73)

Cycling career
- Sport: Cycling

Mahmoud Delshad (Persian: محمود دلشاد; born 25 March 1953) is an Iranian former cyclist. He competed in the individual road race event at the 1976 Summer Olympics.
