= Ad Tak =

Dutch cyclist

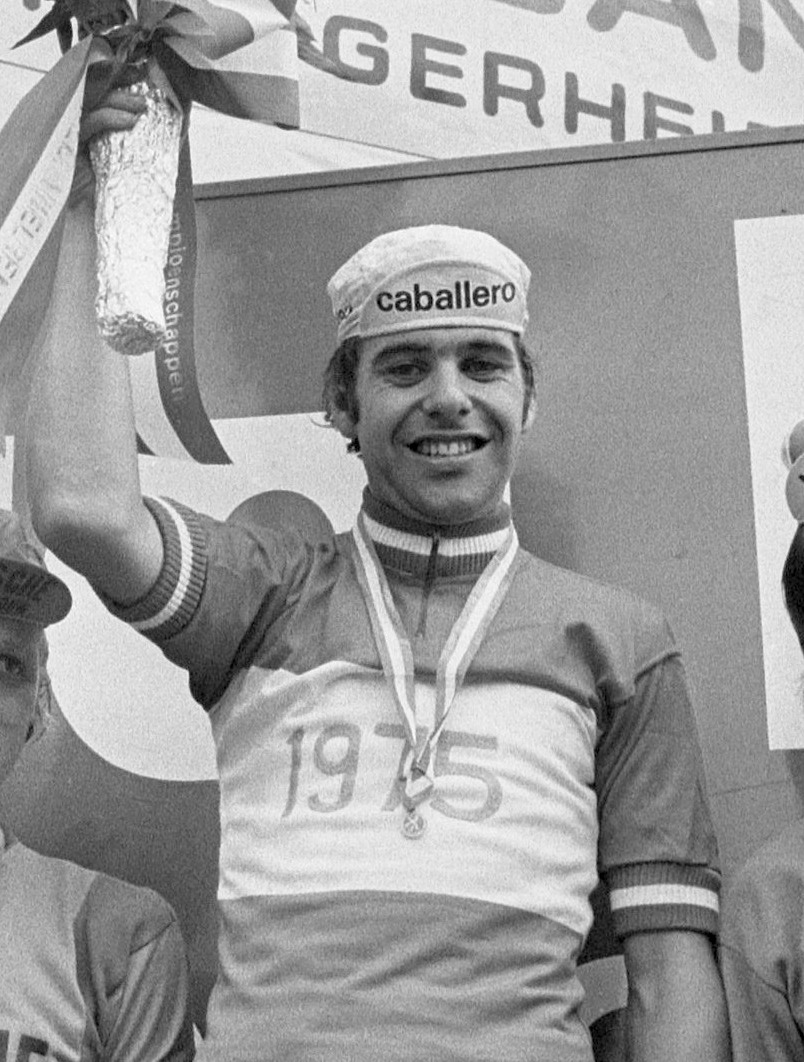
- Ad Tak in 1975

Personal information
- Born: 8 June 1953 (age 73) Nieuwe Gastel, Netherlands
- Height: 1.78 m (5 ft 10 in)
- Weight: 80 kg (180 lb)

Sport
- Sport: Cycling

Achievements and titles
- Olympic finals: 1976

Adrianus Johannes "Ad" Tak (born 8 June 1953) is a retired Dutch cyclist who was active between 1973 and 1985. He competed at the 1976 Summer Olympics and finished in 50th place in the road race.

His uncle, Anton Tak, was also a professional cyclist.

== See also ==
- List of Dutch Olympic cyclists
