= Ramón Noriega =

Venezuelan cyclist

Personal information
- Born: 7 December 1951 (age 74)

Cycling career
- Sport: Cycling

Ramón Noriega (born 7 December 1951) is a Venezuelan former cyclist. He competed in the individual road race event at the 1976 Summer Olympics.
