= Hansjörg Aemisegger =

Swiss cyclist (1952–2025)

Personal information
- Born: 18 February 1952 Winterthur, Switzerland
- Died: 17 January 2025 (aged 72)

Cycling career
- Sport: Cycling
- Role: Rider

Hansjörg Aemisegger (18 February 1952 – 17 January 2025) was a Swiss racing cyclist. He was the Swiss National Road Race champion in 1979. He also rode in the men's road race at the 1976 Summer Olympics.
