= Juan José Moral =

Spanish cyclist (born 1951)

Juan José Moral Arnaiz
Personal information
- Born: 20 August 1951 (age 75) Guipúzcoa, Spain
- Height: 1.80 m (5 ft 11 in)

Cycling career
- Sport: Cycling
- Discipline: Road cycling
- Rider type: Rider

Amateur team
- 6 years: Muebles Xey, OLSA, SUPERSER

Professional team
- 1977: Eldina

Major wins
- 1°. second stage 28. Course de la Paix - Friedensfahrt - Zavod Miru - Wyscig pokoju (1975); 1°. Spanish national road championship sub23 (1972); 1°. Spanish national team time trial championship sub23 (1976); 1° fifth stage Tour of Ireland (1976)

Juan José Moral Arnaiz (born 20 August 1951) is a Spanish former racing cyclist.

He was a delegate for Spain at the 1976 Summer Olympics in Montréal, Canada, where he finished in 33rd place in the individual road race. He won the Spanish national road cycling championship for under 23 in 1971. He participated in the World Cycling Championships in 1974 and 1975. In 1975, representing the Spanish national team, he won the second stage in the Peace Race (Course the la Paix)in Germany, being the first Spanish doing it . In 1976, he finished third in the national road cycling championship and won the national time trial title. He finished second in the Tour of Ireland that year (behind Sean Kelly) and fourth in the Tour de Suisse.
