= Arturo Valencia =

Mexican water polo player (born 1951)

Personal information
- Nationality: Mexican
- Born: 29 January 1951 (age 74)

Sport
- Sport: Water polo

Arturo Valencia (born 29 January 1951) is a Mexican water polo player. He competed at the 1972 Summer Olympics and the 1976 Summer Olympics.
