= Oceania Archery Confederation =

World Archery Oceania
- Abbreviation: OAC
- Formation: 28 September 1998; 27 years ago as Oceania Archery Confederation (FAA)
- Type: Sports organisation
- Headquarters: Palmerston North
- Region served: Oceania
- Members: 33
- Secretary General: (New Zealand) Patsy Vercoe
- President: (Tonga) Arne Jensen
- Parent organization: World Archery
- Website: worldarcheryoceania.org

World Archery Oceania (OAC), formerly the Oceania Archery Confederation is the continental governing body for the sport of archery on the Oceanian Continent and is recognized by a number of international bodies, including the World Archery Federation (WAF) and the Oceania National Olympic Committees (ONOC). WAAf is responsible for regulating and promoting archery across the Oceanian continent, covering all levels of the sport from grassroots to elite performance. World Archery Oceania comprises four zones (East, West, North, and South) with 33 member associations that regulate, promote, and develop the sport in their respective countries and regions.

== Member associations ==
- Archery Australia
- Archery New Zealand
- Fiji Archery Association
- Solomon Islands Archery Federation
- Vanuatu Archery Federation

== Competitions ==
- Oceania Archery Championships
- World Archery Oceania Cup
- World Archery Oceania Challenge

== See also ==
- World Archery
