= José Castañeda =

Mexican cyclist (born 1952)

Personal information
- Born: 29 March 1952 (age 74)

Cycling career
- Sport: Cycling

José Castañeda (born 29 March 1952) is a former Mexican cyclist. He competed in the individual road race and team time trial events at the 1976 Summer Olympics.
