= Archery Australia =

Governing body for the sport of archery in Australia

Archery Australia Ltd
- Sport: Archery
- Jurisdiction: Australia
- Abbreviation: AA
- Founded: 1948
- Affiliation: WAF
- Affiliation date: 1952
- Regional affiliation: OAC
- Headquarters: Sydney Olympic Park, New South Wales
- President: Robert Fiddyment
- CEO: Peter Bromley

Official website
- archery.org.au
- (Australia)

Archery Australia (AA) is the governing body for the sport of archery in Australia.

== History ==
The body was founded in Sydney on 17–18 January 1948 as the Archery Association of Australia. In 1993, the body took its current name of Archery Australia.

== Structure ==
The Association was previously governed by a Board composed of eight societies (Archery Society of NSW, Archery ACT, Archery Victoria, Archery Society of Tasmania, Archery South Australia, Archery Society of Western Australia, Archery Society of North Queensland and Archery Society of South Queensland). The day-to-day affairs of the association were managed by an executive committee.

In 2001, the Board dramatically changed the constitution. The Archery Board now comprises four elected and up to three appointed board members. The day-to-day affairs of the association are managed by the chief executive officer, Rick Hastie.
