= Roberto Álvarez (footballer) =

Spanish footballer (1942–2023)

Personal information
- Full name: Roberto Álvarez Álvarez
- Date of birth: 1 October 1942
- Place of birth: Villamartín del Sil, Spain
- Date of death: 26 June 2023 (aged 80)
- Height: 1.70 m (5 ft 7 in)
- Position: Midfielder

Youth career
- Ponferradina

Senior career*
Years	Team	Apps	(Gls)
1962–1963	Ponferradina	9	(0)
- Cultural Leonesa
1965–1967	Mestalla	9	(1)
1967–1968	Europa	1	(0)
- Tenerife

Managerial career
- 1979–1980: Reus
- 1980–1981: Terrassa
- 1982–1985: Lleida
- 1986–1987: Poblense
- 1987–1988: Teruel
- 1988–1990: Levante
- 1990: Olímpic Xàtiva
- 1990–1991: Palamós
- 1992–1994: Ponferradina
- 1994: Ponferradina
- 1995–1996: Gramenet
- 1996–1997: Poli Almería
- 1997–1998: Levante
- 2001: Gramenet
- * Club domestic league appearances and goals

Roberto Álvarez Álvarez (1 October 1942 – 26 June 2023) was a Spanish footballer who played as a midfielder, and later worked as a coach.

== Playing career ==
Born in Villamartín de Sil, Páramo del Sil, El Bierzo, León, Álvarez started his senior career with SD Ponferradina in 1962, in Tercera División. After a spell at Cultural y Deportiva Leonesa, he moved to Segunda División side CD Mestalla in 1965.

Álvarez made his professional debut on 28 December 1965, starting and scoring his side's third goal through a penalty kick in a 3–3 home draw against Recreativo de Huelva. He appeared rarely for the club during his two-year spell, and subsequently joined CD Tenerife before retiring.

== Managerial career ==
Álvarez started his managerial career with Levante UD in 1988, taking the side back to the second tier after an absence of seven years at first attempt. He was sacked in March 1990, after a winless run of seven games.

In May 1990 Álvarez was appointed manager of fellow league team Palamós CF. After 22 games in charge, he was relieved from his duties.

In 1992 Álvarez was named manager of his first club Ponferradina. In charge for two full seasons, he suffered relegation to the fourth level in his second season before resigning; he would return to the club later in the same year.

Álvarez was subsequently appointed at UDA Gramenet (two spells), CP Almería and Levante.

== Death ==
Álvarez died on 26 June 2023, at the age of 80.
