= Generoso Márquez =

Cuban basketball player

Personal information
- Nationality: Cuban
- Born: 3 September 1952 (age 72)

Sport
- Sport: Basketball

Generoso Márquez (born 3 September 1952) is a Cuban basketball player. He competed in the men's tournament at the 1980 Summer Olympics.
