= Ross Langdon =

Australian water polo player

Personal information
- Nationality: Australian
- Born: 11 March 1951 (age 74)

Sport
- Sport: Water polo

Ross Langdon (born 11 March 1951) is an Australian water polo player. He competed in the men's tournament at the 1976 Summer Olympics.
