= Cameron Hall (basketball player) =

Canadian basketball player

Cameron Hall (born January 2, 1957, in Hamilton, Ontario) is a Canadian retired basketball player from Dundas, Ontario. He was a member of the Canadian Olympic basketball team in 1976. He played for the Duke Blue Devils in 1977 and 1978.
