= Alan Goodrope =

Australian cyclist

Personal information
- Born: 3 May 1951 (age 75)

Cycling career
- Sport: Cycling

Alan Goodrope (born 3 May 1951) is an Australian former cyclist. He competed in the individual road race event at the 1976 Summer Olympics.
