= 1981 Asian Basketball Club Championship =

1981 FIBA Asia Champions Cup
1st Asia Champions Cup

Tournament details
- Host country: Hong Kong
- Dates: 28 March–5 April
- Teams: 8
- Venue(s): 1 (in 1 host city)

Final positions
- Champions: China (1st title)

The Asian Basketball Club Championship 1981 was the 1st staging of the Asian Basketball Club Championship, the basketball club tournament of Asian Basketball Confederation. The tournament was held in Queen Elizabeth Stadium, Hong Kong and Macpherson Stadium, Hong Kong from March 28 to April 5, 1981.

== Results ==
March 28

Kwan On (Hong Kong)	76–123	(China) Bayi Rockets

Queen Elizabeth Stadium, Hong Kong

March 28

Apcor (Philippines)	97–74	(Malaysia) PKN Selangor

Queen Elizabeth Stadium, Hong Kong

March 28

Nippon Kokan (Japan)	89–68	(Saudi Arabia) Ohod

Macpherson Stadium, Hong Kong

March 28

Industry Bank (South Korea)	83–68	(Singapore) SIA

Macpherson Stadium, Hong Kong

March 29

Nippon Kokan (Japan)	92–75	(Singapore) SIA

Queen Elizabeth Stadium, Hong Kong

March 29

Industry Bank (South Korea)	80–90	(Philippines) Apcor

Queen Elizabeth Stadium, Hong Kong

March 29

Kwan On (Hong Kong)	102–95	(Malaysia) PKN Selangor

Macpherson Stadium, Hong Kong

March 29

Bayi Rockets (China)	117–67	(Saudi Arabia) Ohod

Macpherson Stadium, Hong Kong

March 30

Kwan On (Hong Kong)	72–87	(South Korea) Industry Bank

Macpherson Stadium, Hong Kong

March 30

Bayi Rockets (China)	131–76	(Malaysia) PKN Selangor

Macpherson Stadium, Hong Kong

March 30

Ohod (Saudi Arabia)	81–95	(Singapore) SIA

Queen Elizabeth Stadium, Hong Kong

March 30

Nippon Kokan (Japan)	97–73	(Philippines) Apcor

Queen Elizabeth Stadium, Hong Kong

April 1

SIA (Singapore)	64–115	(China) Bayi Rockets

Macpherson Stadium, Hong Kong

April 1

Industry Bank (South Korea)	83–68	(Malaysia) PKN Selangor

Queen Elizabeth Stadium, Hong Kong

April 1

Ohod (Saudi Arabia)	57–113	(Philippines) Apcor

Queen Elizabeth Stadium, Hong Kong

April 1

Kwan On (Hong Kong)	62–95	(Japan) Nippon Kokan

Macpherson Stadium, Hong Kong

April 2

SIA (Singapore)	62–99	(Philippines) Apcor

Queen Elizabeth Stadium, Hong Kong

April 2

Kwan On (Hong Kong)	89–80	(Saudi Arabia) Ohod

Queen Elizabeth Stadium, Hong Kong

April 2

Nippon Kokan (Japan)	92–74	(Malaysia) PKN Selangor

Queen Elizabeth Stadium, Hong Kong

April 2

Bayi Rockets (China)	97–73	(South Korea) Industry Bank

Queen Elizabeth Stadium, Hong Kong

April 3

Kwan On (Hong Kong)	108–94	(Singapore) SIA

Macpherson Stadium, Hong Kong

April 3

PKN Selangor (Malaysia)	102–93	(Saudi Arabia) Ohod

Macpherson Stadium, Hong Kong

April 4

Bayi Rockets (China)	113–87	(Philippines) Apcor

Queen Elizabeth Stadium, Hong Kong

April 4

Industry Bank (South Korea)	87–100	(Japan) Nippon Kokan

Queen Elizabeth Stadium, Hong Kong

April 5

PKN Selangor (Malaysia)	79–83	(Singapore) SIA

Queen Elizabeth Stadium, Hong Kong

April 5

Apcor (Philippines)	118–82	(Hong Kong) Kwan On

Queen Elizabeth Stadium, Hong Kong

April 5

Ohod (Saudi Arabia)	75–108	(South Korea) Industry Bank

Queen Elizabeth Stadium, Hong Kong

April 5

Bayi Rockets (China)	98–53	(Japan) Nippon Kokan

Queen Elizabeth Stadium, Hong Kong

== Final standing ==
Qualified for the 1981 Intercontinental Cup

Rank	Team	Record
1st place, gold medalist(s)	(China) Bayi Rockets	7–0
2nd place, silver medalist(s)	(Japan) Nippon Kokan	6–1
3rd place, bronze medalist(s)	(Philippines) Apcor	5–2
4	(South Korea) Industry Bank	4–3
5	(Hong Kong) Kwan On	3–4
6	(Singapore) SIA	2–5
7	(Malaysia) PKN Selangor	1–6
8	(Saudi Arabia) Ohod	0–7
