= Rubén Camacho =

Mexican cyclist (1953–2015)

Personal information
- Full name: Rubén Camacho Salas
- Born: 17 October 1953 Los Mochis, Mexico
- Died: March 2015 (aged 61)

Cycling career
- Sport: Cycling

Rubén Camacho (17 October 1953 – March 2015) was a Mexican cyclist. He competed in the individual road race event at the 1976 Summer Olympics.
