= Jil Walter =

Samoan archer (born 2001)

Personal information
- Born: 9 July 2001 (age 24)

Sport
- Country: Samoa
- Sport: Archery
Medal record
Women's Archery
Representing Samoa
Pacific Games
Gold medal – first place	2019 Apia	recurve
Gold medal – first place	2019 Apia	mixed team matchplay
Silver medal – second place	2019 Apia	matchplay
Pacific Mini Games
Silver medal – second place	2017 Port Vila	recurve
Silver medal – second place	2017 Port Vila	mixed team matchplay

Jil Grete Walter (born 9 July 2001) is a Samoan archer who has represented Samoa at the Pacific Games and Youth Olympic Games. She is the daughter of Samoan archer Mua'ausa Walter.

Walter started competing in archery at the age of nine.

She represented Samoa at the 2017 Pacific Mini Games in Port Vila, Vanuatu, winning silver in both the women's individual recurve and mixed team recurve.

She competed in the 2018 Summer Youth Olympics in Buenos Aires, Argentina, but did not advance.

At the 2019 Pacific Games in Apia she won gold in the women's recurve, silver in the women's recurve matchplay, and gold (along with her father Mua'ausa Walter) in the mixed team matchplay. Following the competition she gave one of her gold medals to Samoan Prime Minister Tuila'epa Sa'ilele Malielegaoi after he withdrew from the mixed doubles compound category to allow a younger team member to compete.
