= Peter Ridgway (pentathlete) =

Australian modern pentathlete

Personal information
- Born: 23 April 1949 (age 77)

Sport
- Sport: Modern pentathlon

Peter Ridgway (born 23 April 1949) is an Australian modern pentathlete. He competed at the 1976 Summer Olympics, finishing in 42nd place.
