= Ross Haywood =

Australian long-distance runner

Personal information
- Nationality: Australian
- Born: 18 February 1947 (age 79)

Sport
- Sport: Long-distance running
- Event: Marathon

Ross Haywood (born 18 February 1947) is an Australian long-distance runner. He competed in the marathon at the 1976 Summer Olympics in Montreal, Canada. He also represented Australia at the 1974 British Commonwealth Games in Christchurch, New Zealand, where he finished seventh in the 10,000 metres and ninth in the marathon.

== Early life and career ==
Haywood was born in Sydney, New South Wales, and started running at the age of 12. He joined the Bankstown Sports Athletics Club and was coached by Bill Williamson. He won his first national title in 1969, when he became the Australian champion in the 10,000 metres walk. He switched to running in the early 1970s and improved his personal bests in various distances. He won the Australian marathon title in 1973 and 1975, and also won several road races, including the City to Surf in Sydney in 1973 and 1974.
