= Luis Brignoni =

Puerto Rican basketball player

Luis Brignoni Alvarez (born 9 November 1953) is a Puerto Rican former basketball player who competed in the 1976 Summer Olympics.

On Puerto Rico's professional basketball league, the BSN, he played with the Vaqueros de Bayamon and Criollos de Caguas among others.
