= Juan Yañez =

Mexican water polo player (born 1958)

Personal information
- Nationality: Mexican
- Born: 14 April 1958 (age 66)

Sport
- Sport: Water polo

Juan Yañez (born 14 April 1958) is a Mexican water polo player. He competed in the men's tournament at the 1976 Summer Olympics.
