= Beatriz Camuñas =

Mexican swimmer (born 1959)

Personal information
- Born: March 26, 1959 (age 67)

Sport
- Sport: Swimming
- Strokes: Breaststroke
Medal record
Representing Mexico
Central American and Caribbean Games
Gold medal – first place	1974 Santo Domingo	200m breaststroke

Beatriz Camuñas (born 26 or 27 March 1959) is a retired Mexican swimmer who competed in the 1976 Summer Olympics
