= Howard Kelsey =

Canadian basketball player

Personal information
- Born: 8 August 1957 (age 69)
- Listed height: 6 ft 3 in (1.91 m)

Career information
- High school: Point Grey High School (Vancouver, British Columbia, Canada)
- College: Oklahoma State University; Principia College

Career history
- Leones Negroes (Guadalajara, Mexico)

Career highlights
- BC Male Basketball Player of the Year (1981); 3x First Team All-Star at Canadian Senior Men's Basketball Championship; NCAA Division III Conference MVP; 3rd Overall in NCAA Division III Scoring (29.2 ppg) (1977-78); 2x NCAA Division III All-Conference Player; 2x Recipient of BC's Premier Award for Excellence in International Competition

Howard Kelsey (born 8 August 1957) is a former Canadian basketball player and two-time Olympian. He is one of only four athletes to be named to the Canada men's national basketball team immediately out of high school. Over the course of 11 years (1977–88), Kelsey represented Canada in many tournaments in over 400 total games, including two Olympics (1980, 1984); three FIBA World Championships; and two FISU World University Games, where Canada won gold in 1983.

== High School ==
Kelsey played for Point Grey High School in Vancouver, British Columbia. Kelsey still holds the all-time career scoring record in B.C. high school basketball history with a 37.5 ppg average.

While in high school, he led his team to a city championship and a fifth-place finish in the provincial tournament, where he was named tournament MVP.

After high school, Kelsey was selected to the Canadian national men's basketball team, one of only four players in history to be selected immediately after high school.

== International career ==
Kelsey represented Canada in over 400 games over the course of 11 years (1977–88).

=== Olympics ===
Kelsey is a two-time Olympian, being on Canada's Olympic teams in 1980 and 1984. Kelsey is one of two native BC players to represent Canada in two Olympics.

Canada qualified for the 1980 Moscow Olympics; however, Kelsey and his teammates did not compete in these games given Canada's boycott of these Olympics as a result of the Soviet Union's 1979 invasion of Afghanistan. This 1980 Canadian Olympic team was positioned to be a medal-contender given that Canada competed for the bronze medal in the Olympic games preceding and following these 1980 Olympics (1976, 1984), with this time of Canadian basketball being described as "arguably the Canadian national team's greatest era" and "Canada's golden age of basketball".

Canada finished 4th overall in the 1984 Olympics, narrowly missing a medal. This 1984 bronze-medal game constituted the only time in the past 80+ years where Canada has had a legitimate chance of winning an Olympic medal in basketball. This bronze medal game was highly competitive, being tied 18 times with 12 lead changes, with Canada being within one point with less than a minute of play remaining.

=== Other National Team Tournaments ===
Kelsey represented Canada in the 1981 and 1983 FISU World University Games, where in 1983, Canada won the gold medal. In the semifinal match of this tournament, Canada defeated a talented US team led by future NBA hall of famers Charles Barkley and Karl Malone. This 1983 gold medal win constituted one of the finest moments in Canadian basketball history, being the only time in which Canada has won the gold medal in an international basketball tournament. Additionally, in the 1981 World Student Games, Kelsey started for the Canadian team that achieved its first-ever victory over the United States in an international men's basketball tournament.

Kelsey also represented Canada in three FIBA World Championships; and in the 1978 Commonwealth Basketball Championships, where Canada won gold.

Kelsey won many awards while representing Canada, including the BC Male Basketball Player of the Year, being named three times as a First Team All-Star at the Canadian Senior Men's Basketball Championships and being a two-time recipient of BC's Premier Award for Excellence in International Competition.

== College ==
Kelsey lettered twice and started at Oklahoma State University. After two seasons, he transferred to NCAA Division III's Principia College where he played his final two seasons.

At Principia, he earned Conference MVP honors; was a two-time All-Conference player; in one season, finished as the third overall leading scorer among NCAA small colleges with a 29.2 ppg average (before the implementation of the three-point line), which still stands as a Principia record; and finished with an overall 25.1 ppg average at Principia.

== Professional ==
Kelsey played professionally for Leones Negroes in Guadalajara, Mexico where he averaged over 29 points per game over his professional career. After playing professionally, Kelsey was named to the franchise's all-time team.

== Development ==
Kelsey served as the athletic coordinator under Athletic Director Ken Shields at the University of Victoria from 1983 to 1990. During these seven years, University of Victoria athletics won seven consecutive men's and six consecutive women's CIAU national basketball championships, produced sixteen Olympic medals and sixty-four Olympians.

In 2010, Kelsey became an executive vice-president of Canada Basketball.

Kelsey is a co-founder of the Canadian National Alumni Association, an organization aimed at assisting male and female alumni of Canadian national basketball teams; Kelsey continues to help the association to the present day.

Kelsey is the founder of the Puerto Vallarta International Sports Classic, which enjoys around 2,000 annual participants in multiple sports. He is also the chair of the Canada One Foundation, which supports many basketball and other sporting initiatives.

Kelsey is one of three founding partners of the Vancouver NCAA Showcase and Victoria NCAA Invitational which hosts talented men's and women's NCAA teams.

Kelsey was honored by the Puerto Vallarta City Council as a distinguished citizen. Additionally, the Canadian Embassy in Mexico City awarded Kelsey with the Governor General's Visit Medallion "as recognition to extraordinary contributions to Canada-Mexico relations."

== Post-career Awards ==
Kelsey was inducted into the Canada Basketball Hall of Fame as both a player and builder (2019); into the BC Sports Hall of Fame (2012); into the Basketball BC Hall of Fame (2007); into the Principia College Sports Hall of Fame; and was the inaugural inductee into the Point Grey High School Sports Hall of Fame.

Additionally, Kelsey was named a member of The Province newspaper's 50-year "Dream Team", as well as one of the newspaper's top 25 players of all time.

Kelsey was also awarded an NCAA postgraduate scholarship for athletic and academic excellence.

== Personal life ==
Kelsey was born on 8 August 1957. He did not start playing basketball until seventh grade, where he played in a church league. Kelsey earned a Master of Science in Athletic Administration from the University of Oregon. Kelsey now divides his time between Vancouver and Mexico.
