= Shigeto Shimizu =

Japanese basketball player

Personal information
- Nationality: Japanese
- Born: 4 January 1953 (age 72)

Sport
- Sport: Basketball

Shigeto Shimizu (Japanese: 清水茂人, Hepburn: Shimizu Shigeto) (born 4 January 1953) is a Japanese basketball player. He competed in the men's tournament at the 1976 Summer Olympics.
