= Koji Yamamoto (basketball) =

Japanese basketball player

Personal information
- Born: 28 July 1952 Hachimori, Akita, Japan
- Died: 29 March 2001 (aged 48)
- Listed height: 5 ft 9 in (1.75 m)
- Listed weight: 161 lb (73 kg)

Career information
- High school: Noshiro Technical (Noshiro, Akita)
- College: Meiji University

Career history

Playing
- ?-?: NKK Sea Hawks

Coaching
- ?-?: Hitachi Totsuka Leopard

Career highlights
- Japanese High School Champion; Japanese College Champion; Emperor's Cup Champions; 4x JBL Best Five (1977-80)

Koji Yamamoto (山本 浩二, Yamamoto Kōji; 28 July 1952 – 29 March 2001) was a Japanese basketball player. He competed in the men's tournament at the 1976 Summer Olympics.
