= Jorge Flores (basketball) =

Mexican basketball player (1954–2025)

Jorge L. Flores (31 January 1954 – 6 January 2025) was a Mexican basketball player who was on the 1976 Summer Olympics Mexico national basketball team. He was born in La Piedad on 31 January 1954, and died on 6 January 2025, at the age of 70.
