= Martin Martinov =

Bulgarian cyclist

Personal information
- Born: 26 March 1950 (age 76)

Cycling career
- Sport: Cycling

Martin Martinov (Bulgarian: Мартин Мартинов, born 26 March 1950) is a Bulgarian former cyclist. He competed in the individual road race event at the 1976 Summer Olympics.
