= Yutaka Fujimoto =

Japanese basketball player (1950–2001)

Personal information
- Nationality: Japanese
- Born: 21 December 1950
- Died: 31 October 2001 (aged 50)

Sport
- Sport: Basketball

Yutaka Fujimoto (藤本 裕, Fujimoto Yutaka, 21 December 1950 – 31 October 2001) was a Japanese basketball player. He competed in the men's tournament at the 1976 Summer Olympics.
