= Rodolfo Vitela =

Mexican cyclist (born 1949)

Personal information
- Full name: Rodolfo Vitela Arévalo
- Born: 10 March 1949 (age 77) Zacapu, Mexico

Cycling career
- Sport: Cycling

Rodolfo Vitela Arévalo (Note: In this Spanish name, the first or paternal surname is Vitela and the second or maternal family name is Arévalo.) (born 10 March 1949) is a Mexican former cyclist. He competed in the individual road race and team time trial events at the 1976 Summer Olympics. He won the Vuelta Ciclista a Costa Rica in 1974.
