= Shoji Yuki =

Japanese basketball player

Personal information
- Nationality: Japanese
- Born: 27 August 1950 (age 74)

Sport
- Sport: Basketball

Shoji Yuki (結城 昭二, Yūki Shōji, born 27 August 1950) is a Japanese basketball player. He competed in the men's tournament at the 1976 Summer Olympics.
