= Peter Walsh (basketball) =

Australian basketball player

Personal information
- Nationality: Australian
- Born: 9 January 1954 (age 72)

Sport
- Sport: Basketball

Peter Walsh (born 9 January 1954) is an Australian basketball player. He competed in the men's tournament at the 1976 Summer Olympics and the 1980 Summer Olympics. He is 7'2 feet tall and has three daughters and 7 grandchildren. He is a basketball coach in the current day.
