= Alejandro Ortiz (basketball) =

Cuban basketball player

Alejandro Ortiz (born 3 May 1952) is a Cuban former basketball player who competed in the 1976 Summer Olympics and in the 1980 Summer Olympics.
