= Mohamed Hamdi Osman =

Egyptian basketball player

Personal information
- Nationality: Egyptian
- Born: 17 June 1954 (age 70)

Sport
- Sport: Basketball

Mohamed Hamdi Osman (born 17 June 1954) is an Egyptian basketball player. He competed in the men's tournament at the 1976 Summer Olympics.
