= Osman Hassan =

Egyptian basketball player

Personal information
- Nationality: Egyptian
- Born: 27 January 1952 (age 73)

Sport
- Sport: Basketball

Osman Hassan (born 27 January 1952) is an Egyptian basketball player. He competed in the men's tournament at the 1976 Summer Olympics.
