= Awad Abdel Nabi =

Egyptian basketball player (born 1953)

Personal information
- Nationality: Egyptian
- Born: 9 May 1953 (age 71)
- Height: 1.98 m (6 ft 6 in)
- Weight: 80 kg (180 lb)

Sport
- Sport: Basketball

Awad Abdel Nabi (born 9 May 1953) is an Egyptian basketball player. He competed in the 1972 and 1976 Summer Olympics.
