= Manuel Sáenz =

Mexican basketball player (born 1948)

Personal information
- Nationality: Mexican
- Born: 21 January 1948 (age 78)

Sport
- Sport: Basketball

Manuel Sáenz (born 21 January 1948) is a Mexican former basketball player. He competed in the men's tournament at the 1976 Summer Olympics.
