= Hideki Hamaguchi =

Japanese basketball player

Personal information
- Nationality: Japanese
- Born: 4 January 1956 (age 70) Nagasaki, Japan

Sport
- Sport: Basketball

Hideki Hamaguchi (浜口 秀樹, Hamaguchi Hideki; born 4 January 1956) is a Japanese basketball player. He played basketball at Keihoku High School in Tokyo, and competed in the men's tournament at the 1976 Summer Olympics.
