= John Maddock (basketball) =

Australian basketball player

Personal information
- Nationality: Australian
- Born: 19 October 1951 (age 73); Hobart, Australia

Sport
- Sport: Basketball

John Maddock (born 19 October 1951) is an Australian basketball player. He competed in the men's tournament at the 1976 Summer Olympics.
