= Ahmed Abdel Hamid El-Saharty =

Egyptian basketball player (born 1950)

Personal information
- Nationality: Egyptian
- Born: 26 August 1950 (age 74)

Sport
- Sport: Basketball

Ahmed Abdel Hamid El-Saharty (born 26 August 1950) is an Egyptian basketball player. He competed in the men's tournament at the 1972 Summer Olympics and the 1976 Summer Olympics.
