= Michael Tucker (basketball) =

Australian basketball player

Personal information
- Nationality: Australian
- Born: 23 August 1954
- Died: 17 January 2012 (aged 57)

Sport
- Sport: Basketball

Michael Tucker (23 August 1954 – 17 January 2012) was an Australian basketball player. He competed in the men's tournament at the 1976 Summer Olympics and the 1980 Summer Olympics.
