= Peter Kesting =

Australian cyclist

Personal information
- Born: 7 June 1955 (age 71)

Cycling career
- Sport: Cycling

Peter Kesting (born 7 June 1955) is an Australian former cyclist. He competed in the individual road race event at the 1976 Summer Olympics.
