= Hamdi Adly El-Seoudi =

Egyptian basketball player

Personal information
- Full name: Hamdi Adly El-Seoudi Ibrahim
- Nationality: Egyptian
- Born: 7 February 1953 (age 72)
- Height: 1.94 m (6 ft 4 in)
- Weight: 82 kg (181 lb)

Sport
- Sport: Basketball

Hamdi Adly El-Seoudi (born 7 February 1953) is an Egyptian basketball player. He competed in the 1976 Summer Olympics.
