= Bobby Álvarez =

Puerto Rican basketball player

Personal information
- Nationality: Puerto Rican
- Born: 20 August 1955 (age 69)

Sport
- Sport: Basketball

Bobby Álvarez (born 20 August 1955) is a Puerto Rican basketball player. He competed in the men's tournament at the 1976 Summer Olympics.
