= Sal Sansonetti =

Australian cyclist

Personal information
- Born: 24 January 1946 (age 80) Raiano, Italy

Cycling career
- Sport: Cycling

Sal Sansonetti (born 24 January 1946) is an Australian former cyclist. He competed in the team time trial event at the 1976 Summer Olympics. He is a twin brother of Remo Sansonetti. The brothers were chosen as joint flag-bearers for the Australian team at the 1978 Commonwealth Games. The Sansonettis produced the bikes for the Australian team.
