= Rafael Palomar =

Mexican basketball player (born 1951)

Personal information
- Born: 19 July 1951 (age 75) Ciudad Juárez, Chihuahua, Mexico
- Listed height: 6 ft 8 in (2.03 m)
- Listed weight: 220 lb (100 kg)

Career information
- High school: Ysleta (El Paso, Texas)
- College: Southern Idaho (1969–1971); Texas Tech (1971–1972); Cameron (1974–75); UACJ
- NBA draft: 1974: 8th round, 144th overall pick
- Drafted by: Milwaukee Bucks

Career highlights
- CIMEBA champion (1984); Gran 8 champion (1977); Second-team All-SWC (1972); First-team All-OCC (1973); Second-team All-ICAC (1971)
- Stats at Basketball Reference
Medals
Men's basketball
Representing Mexico
Pan American Games
| Bronze medal – third place | 1983 Caracas | Team competition |
Central American and Caribbean Games
| Bronze medal – third place | 1982 Havana | Team competition |

Rafael J. Palomar Acosta (born 19 July 1951) is a Mexican-American former basketball player. He was a longtime member of the Mexico national team, competing in the 1976 Summer Olympics and winning a bronze medal at the 1983 Pan American Games.

Palomar was inducted into the National Hispanic Hall of Fame in 1999, the Juárez Athletic Hall of Fame in 2008, the El Paso Athletic Hall of Fame in 2012, and the Chihuahua Athletic Hall of Fame in 2014.

== Early life and high school career ==
Palomar was born on 19 July 1951, in Ciudad Juárez, Chihuahua, growing up in the rough neighborhood of Bellavista. At age 12, he moved with his parents to the neighboring city of El Paso, Texas, where he began playing basketball on outdoor courts. Palomar attended Ysleta High School in El Paso and played as a center on the school's basketball team. As a senior, he recorded 26 points and a state-record 41 rebounds in a game against El Paso Tech. Palomar earned first-team all-district in his only varsity season. After graduating from Ysleta in 1969, he was recruited to play college basketball at College of Southern Idaho (CSI) for coach Jerry Hale. Hale was an assistant basketball coach at the University of Texas at El Paso when Palomar was a "lanky, skinny" high school player, and offered him a scholarship after accepting the CSI head coaching position.

== College career ==
=== College of Southern Idaho ===
As a freshman at CSI in 1969–70, Palomar "played considerably" and was "particularly potent around the backboards", averaging about five points per game as a forward as he helped the Golden Eagles compile a 32–5 record and a NJCAA tournament appearance. As a sophomore in 1970–71, he was made the starting center while incumbent starter Tim Bassett was moved to the forward spot. On January 16, 1971, Palomar tied the school record by scoring 38 points in a 90–75 win over Snow. He helped the Golden Eagles achieve the No. 1 junior college ranking and go undefeated in conference play, earning second-team all-Intermountain Collegiate Athletic Conference (ICAC) honors. Palomar led the NJCAA Region 18 tournament in scoring, including a 26-point outing in a 68–65 win over North Idaho in the final. He scored 25 points in a 77–72 win over Columbia in the quarterfinals of the NJCAA tournament; CSI finished as national runner-ups after losing the championship game, ending the season with a 37–3 record. Palomar averaged a double-double on the season – leading the team with 19.4 points per game while grabbing 11 rebounds per game – and earned the Vern Riddle Memorial award as the player on the team "that has worked hardest to push his full potential". He also set the program record with a 68 percent shooting percentage.

During his time at CSI, Palomar developed a signature hook shot which he launched "from close to his body, with mortar-like trajectory". He described having to learn the technique after getting his shots blocked by teammates when he first arrived on campus. The 1970–71 CSI team, which also included Ron Behagen in addition to Palomar and Bassett, was hailed for years afterwards by local media as the best in program history.

=== Texas Tech ===
In May 1971, Palomar announced his intentions to transfer to the University of Idaho. However, just a few days later, he signed a National Letter of Intent with Texas Tech University after garnering more than 20 scholarship offers. "I'm pretty happy about going to Tech," said Palomar of picking the Red Raiders. "It's a lot closer to home than Idaho, and my parents agreed completely with my decision." Palomar began the 1971–72 season at the forward spot. However, he was forced back into the center position (which he called his "natural spot") following a suspension to starter Ron Richardson. In late December, Palomar tallied 30 points and eight rebounds on 12-of-20 shooting in a 95–92 loss to Eastern Kentucky in the opening round of the All-College Basketball Tournament. Two days later, he registered 29 points and seven rebounds on 11-of-16 shooting in an 88–84 loss to Indiana State in the classification round.

On January 8, 1972, Palomar put up 21 points in an 88–81 win over Southern Illinois – their first road win of the season. In his next game, he scored a game-high 23 points and grabbed 13 rebounds in a 73–67 win over Baylor which ended a five-game losing streak. On January 22, Palomar recorded 19 points and 13 rebounds in an 89–85 win over Rice. On February 15, also against Rice, he had 22 points (including 19 in the second half) and 13 rebounds in an 80–76 win. In his next game, Palomar notched 28 points and 12 rebounds in an 81–76 win over Texas. Three days later, on February 22, he led the Red Raiders with 19 points and 14 rebounds in an 87–73 loss to SMU. On February 26, Palomar registered 21 points and 20 rebounds in an 86–85 win over Arkansas. On February 29, he accrued 23 points and 10 rebounds in an 89–88 loss to TCU.

In his lone season at Texas Tech, Palomar played 26 games and averaged 15.2 points and 8.6 rebounds while shooting 54.2 percent from the field. He ranked second in the Southwest Conference (SWC) in rebounding, and garnered second-team all-SWC honors from both the Associated Press and United Press International. However, on November 4, 1972, Texas Tech head coach Gerald Myers announced that Palomar had quit the team and withdrawn from the school due to "personal reasons".

=== Cameron ===
I was having some problems and told [Oglesby] that I wanted to transfer. He said he'd get me a school where I could finish my education. Fortunately for me, I went to Cameron University."

— Palomar explaining how he transferred to Cameron with the help of Texas Tech assistant coach Corky Oglesby.

Palomar transferred to Cameron College for the second semester of the 1972–73 academic year, taking a redshirt season to learn the Aggies system under head coach Red Miller. He opened his senior season in 1973–74 as the team's starting center. In his team debut on November 15, 1973, Palomar recorded 25 points and 18 rebounds in a 103–64 win over Arkansas Tech. He earned MVP honors at the All-Sports Classic later that month, scoring 31 points in a 101–78 semifinal win over New Mexico Highlands before tallying 22 points and 15 rebounds in an 82–72 win over Dallas Baptist in the championship game. On November 27, Palomar registered 19 points and 15 rebounds in a 113–84 win over the Oklahoma College of Liberal Arts (OCLA). On December 5, he put up 22 points in a 111–83 loss to NCAA Division I opponent New Mexico.

In the conference opener on December 7, Palomar scored the game-winning lay-up to cap off a 28-point, 13-rebound performance in a 62–61 win over Panhandle State. The following day, he notched 28 points and 16 rebounds in a 76–66 win over the Northwestern State Rangers. In his next game, on December 11, Palomar accrued 25 points and 17 rebounds in a 98–93 overtime win over Langston. On January 4, 1974, he tallied 26 points and 21 rebounds in an 82–75 win over the Southwestern Pirates. Three days later, Palomar scored a game-high 23 points in a 79–70 win over OCLA. At the Cameron Hardball Classic in mid-January, he contributed 20 and 18 points in back-to-back victories over Wiley and the nationally-ranked Marymount Spartans, respectively. On January 26, Palomar paced the Aggies with 20 points in an 85–78 loss to Oklahoma Baptist. On February 23, he posted 16 points and 15 rebounds in a 74–67 win over Phillips, capturing a share of the Oklahoma Collegiate Conference (OCC) along with the Central State Bronchos. Palomar helped the Aggies win the District IX tournament, notably scoring 20 points in a 70–66 overtime win over Central State in the semifinal, to qualify for the NAIA tournament.

In the first round of the NAIA tournament, Palomar registered 24 points and 13 rebounds in a 92–88 loss to top-seeded Fairmont State, ending their season with a 24–6 record. He was described by sportswriter Jerry Izenberg as being "about as easy to move out from under the basket as a case of advanced athletes foot", but his game-tying tip-in with under two minutes remaining was disallowed after he was called for his fifth foul. In his lone season at Cameron, Palomar played in all 30 games and averaged 17.9 points (second on the team) and a team-high 10.4 rebounds per game on 57.8 percent shooting. He was also the only player on the team to appear in all 30 games. Palomar earned first-team all-OCC honors and was "on all the all-American honorable mention lists".

=== UACJ ===
After graduating from Cameron, Palomar played college basketball in Mexico at the Universidad Autónoma de Ciudad Juárez (UACJ), helping the Indios win the prestigious Gran 8 tournament in 1977 under head coach Francisco “Rufo” Torres.

== Professional career ==
Despite playing at the National Association of Intercollegiate Athletics (NAIA) level in college, Palomar was considered as a potential draft pick and played in front of pro scouts at the NAIA tournament in Kansas City, Missouri. Palomar was selected by the Milwaukee Bucks of the National Basketball Association (NBA) in the eighth round (144th overall) of the 1974 NBA draft. He later signed with the San Antonio Spurs of the rival American Basketball Association (ABA). Palomar was the penultimate player cut by the Spurs. He also suffered a knee injury and underwent two surgeries, sidelining him for about a year.

In Mexico, Palomar played in the Circuito Mexicano de Básquetbol (CIMEBA) and the original version of the Circuito de Baloncesto de la Costa del Pacífico (CIBACOPA), being described as "a legend in the Mexican leagues" by The Palm Beach Post. National team head coach Gustavo Saggiante said that he, Antonio Ayala, and Arturo Guerrero were "heroes in [his] country".

Palomar played with the Indios de Ciudad Juárez of the CIMEBA as they hosted NBA and ABA All-Star teams in the Triangular NBA-ABA Professional Basketball Tournament in June 1976, just one week after the ABA–NBA merger. He also played for and coached the Águilas del IMSS. In 1981, Palomar played on a CIMEBA all-star team funded by the Mexican government at the Delray Invitational Basketball Classic, a prestigious amateur tournament in Delray Beach, Florida. Despite being touted as a national team, the squad included four American players from the league. In 1984, Palomar played with the Brujos de Guayama of the Baloncesto Superior Nacional (BSN), where he averaged 13.3 points and seven rebounds in 28 games. However, he returned to Mexico along with compatriot Julio Gallardo after the season was halted due to a player eligibility scandal involving the Leones de Ponce.

Palomar continued playing recreational basketball after his professional career. He helped the El Paso Diamondbacks over-40 team to a second-place finish at the 1999 National Cinco de Mayo tournament in San Antonio, earning all-tournament honors.

== National team career ==
Palomar was selected to represent Mexico at the 1973 Summer Universiade held in Moscow, where he was coached by Henry Iba. He joined the team in Monterrey for training camp, during which he lost over 30 lb (14 kg) due to the limited amount of food provided by the Mexican government. Palomar scored 30 points, including 20 in the first half, in a 71–60 loss to Canada. (Note: Despite the score being incorrectly reported as 71–69 in the El Paso Herald-Post, the score is confirmed as 71–60 by the Associated Press, the Canadian Press, and United Press International.) He averaged 23.5 points per game during the competition; Mexico finished 13th out of 28 teams following an 87–77 loss to Great Britain in the classification round.

=== Senior national team ===
Palomar was a longtime member of the Mexico senior national team, which he represented in more than 20 countries across three continents. He played in one Olympic tournament, three Pre-Olympic Basketball Tournaments, and three Pan American Games, among other competitions, always sporting the No. 7 jersey.

After graduating from Cameron, Palomar was contacted by Mexican officials and joined the national team, representing Mexico at the 1975 Pan American Games held in Mexico City, where they finished in fourth place. As a warmup for the games, he also played in a three-game series against a NAIA All-Star team, as well as a three-game series against UTEP. Palomar averaged 16.8 points in nine games at the 1976 Pre-Olympic Basketball Tournament, including 22 points in a win over Spain, 20 points in a win over Bulgaria, and 22 points in a win over Brazil. He helped Mexico compile a 6–3 record to finish in third place and qualify for the 1976 Summer Olympics held in Montreal a few weeks later.

At the 1976 Montreal Olympics, Palomar averaged 15.8 points and a tournament-leading 10.3 rebounds per game, helping Mexico achieve a 10th place finish. He scored a team-high 19 points in their opening loss to the Soviet Union. which he followed up by tallying 20 points, 17 rebounds, and three assists in a win over Japan. Palomar then posted 20 points and 15 rebounds (including 10 offensive rebounds) in an overtime loss to Australia, who were led by 48 points from Ed Palubinskas. However, after fouling out against Cuba, he allegedly attempted to kick Yugoslavian referee Simon Oblak, who reported the incident to FIBA secretary-general Borislav Stanković. As a result, Palomar was disqualified from Mexico's last two games and subsequently sent home by head coach Carlos Bru, who said that Palomar admitted to the offense, "but it was just a minor thing. If he had really been mad he would have punched him."

Palomar played at the 1977 Centrobasket in Panama, followed by the 1979 Pan American Games and 1980 Tournament of the Americas, both held in Puerto Rico. Prior to the Americas tournament, he also played in a tuneup tournament hosted in Mexico City, scoring 21 points in a 102–74 win over Missouri Western. Palomar helped Mexico to a bronze-medal finish at the 1982 Central American and Caribbean Games held in Cuba after averaging 16.7 points per game. He won another bronze medal with the team at the 1983 Pan American Games in Venezuela, where they twice faced off against a United States team starring Michael Jordan and Wayman Tisdale. Palomar next played at the 1984 Tournament of the Americas, scoring a game-high 28 points in a 103–90 win over Cuba. He made his final national team appearance at the 1985 Centrobasket.

== Personal life ==
Palomar was born in Mexico like his father, who was also named Rafael, while his mother Delfina, sisters Josefina and Manuelita, and brother Miguel were all born in the United States. His mother, a homemaker, died in 1991 while his father, a steel cutter, died in 2007. Palomar became a naturalized citizen of the U.S. at the age of 10. While attending the College of Southern Idaho, he claimed to be half-Apache, reportedly playing in a "national all-Indian tournament" in Wichita, Kansas. Palomar earned a degree in physical education at Cameron College—now known as Cameron University.

Palomar married Margaret Fernandez in El Paso in December 1972. They divorced in October 1975. Palomar went on to have three daughters with former Mexico women's national volleyball team player Patricia Palomar, all of whom played college volleyball: Kayla at USC, Zaira at Laredo College, and Siria at the College of Southern Idaho. His uncle, José Acosta Moya, was a famed basketball coach who founded the Pioneros de Delicias and guided the team to the CIMEBA title in 1993, while one of his grandsons, Ivan Palomar, drew local media attention as a high school basketball player in Arizona in the late 2010s.

After his playing career, Palomar worked as a probation officer and then as a parole officer, retiring in 2009 in a senior role. He also worked as a substitute teacher in El Paso. Palomar latter settled in Phoenix, Arizona. In December 2022, his death was incorrectly reported by publications such as El Diario de Juárez, though it was corrected soon afterwards. Palomar's death was announced on 27 January 2025; however this was later disputed by the family.
