= Gabriel Nava =

Mexican basketball player

Personal information
- Nationality: Mexican
- Born: 22 March 1952 (age 73)

Sport
- Sport: Basketball

Gabriel Nava (born 22 March 1952) is a Mexican basketball player. He competed in the men's tournament at the 1976 Summer Olympics.
