= Javier Guerra (water polo) =

Mexican water polo player (born 1954)

Personal information
- Nationality: Mexican
- Born: 7 December 1954 (age 71)

Sport
- Sport: Water polo

Javier Guerra (born 7 December 1954) is a Mexican water polo player. He competed in the men's tournament at the 1976 Summer Olympics. He was a member of the gold medal team at the 1975 Pan American Games.
