= Mohamed El-Gohary Hanafy =

Egyptian basketball player

Personal information
- Nationality: Egyptian
- Born: 26 January 1955 (age 70)

Sport
- Sport: Basketball

Mohamed El-Gohary Hanafy (born 26 January 1955) is an Egyptian basketball player. He competed in the men's tournament at the 1976 Summer Olympics.
