= Fahti Mohamed Kamel =

Egyptian basketball player

Personal information
- Nationality: Egyptian
- Born: 24 October 1952 (age 72)

Sport
- Sport: Basketball

Fahti Mohamed Kamel (born 24 October 1952) is an Egyptian basketball player. He competed in the men's tournament at the 1972 Summer Olympics and the 1976 Summer Olympics.
