= Ismail Selim Mohamed =

Egyptian basketball player (born 1944)

Personal information
- Nationality: Egyptian
- Born: 8 October 1944 (age 81)

Sport
- Sport: Basketball

Ismail Selim Mohamed (born 8 October 1944) is an Egyptian basketball player. He competed in the men's tournament at the 1972 Summer Olympics and the 1976 Summer Olympics.
