= Russell Simon =

Australian basketball player

Personal information
- Nationality: Australian
- Born: 17 October 1949 (age 75)

Sport
- Sport: Basketball

Russell Simon (born 17 October 1949) is an Australian basketball player. He competed in the men's tournament at the 1976 Summer Olympics.
