= Samuel Campis =

Mexican basketball player (born 1948)

Personal information
- Nationality: Mexican
- Born: 10 September 1948 (age 76)

Sport
- Sport: Basketball

Samuel Campis (born 10 September 1948) is a Mexican basketball player. He competed in the men's tournament at the 1976 Summer Olympics.
