= Rubén Alcala =

Mexican basketball player (born 1953)

Personal information
- Nationality: Mexican
- Born: 21 June 1953 (age 71)

Sport
- Sport: Basketball

Rubén Alcala (born 21 June 1953) is a Mexican basketball player. He competed in the men's tournament at the 1976 Summer Olympics.
