= Tony Barnett =

Australian basketball player

Personal information
- Full name: Anthony Barnett
- Nationality: Australian
- Born: 11 June 1952 (age 73)

Sport
- Sport: Basketball

Anthony Barnett (born 11 June 1952) is an Australian basketball player. He competed in the men's tournament at the 1976 Summer Olympics.
