= NKK Sea Hawks =

- Leagues: JBL
- Founded: 1939
- Folded: 1999
- Location: Kawasaki, Kanagawa
- Championships: 5

The NKK Sea Hawks were a Japanese basketball team that played in the Japan Basketball League. They were based in Kawasaki, Kanagawa Prefecture.

== Notable players ==
- Joe Courtney (basketball)
- Yutaka Fujimoto
- Manabu Fujita
- Nobuo Hattori
- Steve Hood
- Takashi Itoyama
- Dana Jones
- Shōji Kamata
- Norihiko Kitahara
- Kiyohide Kuwata
- Eric McArthur
- Fumihiko Moroyama
- Kazufumi Sakai
- Kenji Sōda
- Masatomo Taniguchi
- Keith Tower
- Kaoru Wakabayashi
- Kōji Yamamoto

== See also ==
- NKK SC, parent club
