= Jesús García (basketball) =

Mexican basketball player (born 1952)

Personal information
- Nationality: Mexican
- Born: 24 February 1952 (age 73)

Sport
- Sport: Basketball

Jesús García (born 24 February 1952) is a Mexican basketball player. He competed in the men's tournament at the 1976 Summer Olympics.
