= Angel Padrón (basketball) =

Cuban basketball player (born 1953)

Personal information
- Nationality: Cuban
- Born: 22 August 1953 (age 72)

Sport
- Sport: Basketball

Angel Padrón (born 22 August 1953) is a Cuban basketball player. He competed in the men's tournament at the 1976 Summer Olympics.
