= Mohamed Essam Khaled =

Egyptian basketball player

Personal information
- Nationality: Egyptian
- Born: 11 January 1951 (age 74)

Sport
- Sport: Basketball

Mohamed Essam Khaled (born 11 January 1951) is an Egyptian basketball player. He competed in the men's tournament at the 1972 Summer Olympics and the 1976 Summer Olympics.
