= Remo Sansonetti =

Australian cyclist (born 1946)

Personal information
- Born: 24 January 1946 (age 80) Raiano, Italy

Cycling career
- Sport: Cycling
Medal record
Representing AUS
Men's cycling
Commonwealth Games
| Bronze medal – third place | 1974 Christchurch | Road race |
| Silver medal – second place | 1982 Brisbane | Road team time trial |

Remo Sansonetti (born 24 January 1946) is an Australian former cyclist. He competed at the 1972, 1976 and 1980 Summer Olympics. Sansonetti set the fastest time in the amateur Goulburn to Sydney Classic in 1979 run from Goulburn to Liverpool. He is a twin brother of Sal Sansonetti. The Sansonettis produced the bikes for the Australian team.
