= Antonio Ayala =

Mexican basketball player (born 1947)

Antonio Ayala Arias (born 2 February 1947 in Los Reyes de Salgado, Michoacán) is a Mexican former basketball player who competed in the 1968 Summer Olympics and in the 1976 Summer Olympics.
