= Canada men's national basketball team =

Canada
- FIBA ranking: 5 (September 1, 2026)
- Joined FIBA: 1936; 90 years ago
- FIBA zone: FIBA Americas
- National federation: Canada Basketball
- Coach: Gordon Herbert
- Nickname: Team Canada

Olympic Games
- Appearances: 10
- Medals: (silver) Silver: (1936)

FIBA World Cup
- Appearances: 15
- Medals: (bronze) Bronze: (2023)

FIBA AmeriCup
- Appearances: 20
- Medals: (silver) Silver: (1980, 1999); (bronze) Bronze: (1984, 1988, 2001, 2015)
| Home | Away |

First international
- Canada 24–17 Brazil (Berlin, Germany; August 7, 1936)

Biggest win
- Canada 128–38 Malaysia (Tenerife, Spain; July 5, 1986)

Biggest defeat
- Greece 123–49 Canada (Athens, Greece; August 17, 2010)
Medal record
Men's basketball
Olympic Games
| Silver medal – second place | 1936 Berlin | Team |
FIBA World Cup
| Bronze medal – third place | 2023 Philippines–Japan–Indonesia |
FIBA AmeriCup
| Silver medal – second place | 1980 Puerto Rico |
| Silver medal – second place | 1999 Puerto Rico |
| Bronze medal – third place | 1984 Brazil |
| Bronze medal – third place | 1988 Uruguay |
| Bronze medal – third place | 2001 Argentina |
| Bronze medal – third place | 2015 Mexico |
Pan American Games
| Silver medal – second place | 2015 Toronto | Team |

The Canada men's national basketball team (French: Équipe du Canada de basketball masculin) represents Canada in international basketball competitions since 1923. They are overseen by Canada Basketball, the governing body for basketball in Canada.

In 10 Olympic appearances, Canada has won one medal in basketball – a silver at the 1936 Games in Berlin. The team finished fourth in 1976 and 1984. Canada has won six medals at the FIBA AmeriCup – two silver medals in 1980 and 1999, as well as four bronze medals in 1984, 1988, 2001, and 2015. In recent decades, the team also won its first medals at the Pan American Games, a silver medal in 2015, and the FIBA World Cup, a bronze medal in 2023.

The Canadian senior national team won its only gold medal at a university-level tournament, the 1983 Summer Universiade, which the country hosted in Edmonton, Alberta.

== History ==
=== Early years ===
As the country credited for bringing forth the inventor of the game, Canada's national team has often been a major competitor at the global stage.

The Western Mustangs basketball team in 1947–48 and 1951–52 coached by John P. Metras, were the first university team to compete in the trials to select the national team.

Through the 70s and 80s, Team Canada consistently placed among the top teams in the world. The emergence of Steve Nash gave another boost to the team in the 1990s. Yet, great performances became more scarce when he retired.

=== 2009–2016 ===
Canada began the new cycle entering the 2009 FIBA Americas Championship. Canada advanced to the quarterfinals, after posting a 2–2 record in the Preliminary round. A Uruguay loss to Argentina on the final day of group play meant that the winner of the Canada-Dominican Republic game would advance to the semifinals. Canada would go on to defeat them 76–80. In the semi-finals, Canada would lose to top-seeded Brazil 73–65. By finishing in the top four, this guaranteed the team a place in the 2010 FIBA World Championship held in Turkey. Canada unfortunately finished last (6th) of the Group D, and got ranked 22nd of the FIBA World Cup.

Critics blamed the absence of Steve Nash, Samuel Dalembert, Jamaal Magloire and Matt Bonner for Canada's disappointing performance at the 2010 FIBA World Championship. Ambitions to gather Canada's most outstanding basketball players for the 2010 squad failed as Nash retired from the national team in 2007, Bonner did not get his citizenship in time, Dalembert was cut from the team after issues with former head coach Rautins and Magloire simply opted not to play.

With a spot at the 2012 Summer Olympics up for grabs, Canada entered the 2011 FIBA Americas Championship with aspiration of making the quarterly tournament for the first time since 2000. Canada would ultimately bow out in the Second round of group play, and miss out on both a direct ticket to Beijing and the 2012 FIBA World Olympic Qualifying Tournament.

On May 9, 2012, Steve Nash was named general manager of the national team of Canada.

After a disappointing showing at the 2013 FIBA Americas Championship, Team Canada would not find success until the 2015 FIBA Americas Championship. In the tournament, Canada advanced to the semi-finals where they were defeated by Venezuela in a nail-bitting 78–79 loss. In the third-place game, they would defeat Mexico 87–86 to claim the bronze medal.

With there 3rd place showing at the FIBA Americas Championship, Canada qualified to the 2016 FIBA World Olympic Qualifying Tournament – Manila. Needing to finish first to qualify for the Olympics in Rio de Janeiro, Canada would advance all the way to the finals to face France. In front of a crown of 13,000, at the Mall of Asia Arena, Canada would fall 74–83 and miss out on yet another Summer Olympics.

=== 2017–2020 ===
After failing to qualify for the Olympics, Canada participated at the 2017 FIBA AmeriCup in South America. The team was composed mostly of non-NBA players, and ended group play with a 1–2 record. The poor performance led them to finishing in 8th place.

The Canadians made their debut at the 2018 Commonwealth Games on the Gold Coast, winning a silver medal.

With the approaching 2019 FIBA World Cup, Rowan Barrett hired Toronto Raptors head coach Nick Nurse to coach Team Canada through the World Cup and possibly the 2020 Summer Olympics in Tokyo.

The team withdrew from its FIBA AmeriCup qualifying games against Cuba on November 29, 2020, and against the U.S. Virgin Islands on November 30, 2020, on the advice of medical experts due to risks posed by the ongoing COVID-19 pandemic. As a consequence on January 20, 2021, the International Basketball Federation docked the team a point in the standings in addition to a 160,000 Swiss francs fine levied against Canada Basketball.

At the 18th edition of the FIBA Basketball World Cup, Canada was drawn in Group H, with Australia, Lithuania, and Senegal. Canada finished in 21st place, their second worst showing at the men's international tournament.

Canada had one last change to qualify for the Summer Olympics in Tokyo, participating at the 2020 FIBA Men's Olympic Qualifying Tournaments – Victoria. Canada began the Preliminary round finishing with a 2–0 record, advancing to the semi-finals where they would face Czech Republic. A closely fought game, Canada would ultimately fall 101–103 in OT, missing out on the Summer Games for a 5th straight tournament.

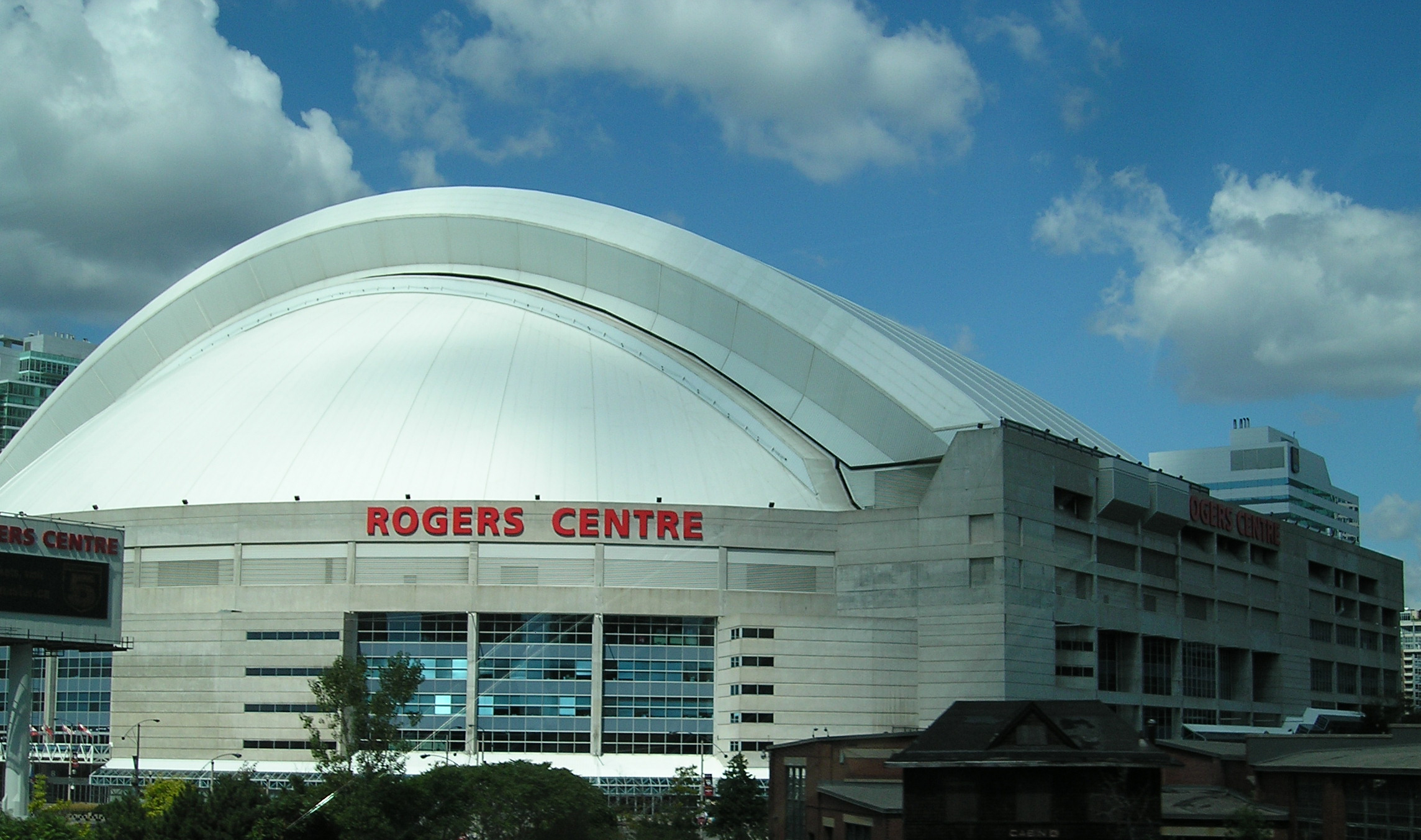
The Rogers Centre in Toronto has served Team Canada as home court for most of their matches.

=== 2021–present ===
After numerous setbacks in tournament play, Canada Basketball introduced the concept of the 'Summer Core' consisting of 14 players who were willing to commit to represent Canada for three consecutive summers. This included the 2023 FIBA World Cup and participation at the 2024 Summer Olympics, where the Canadian men are making their first appearance since Nash led them to Sydney in 2000.

In 2022, the Canadians participated at the 19th edition of the FIBA AmeriCup. They finished group play in second place with a 2–1 record. In the quarter-finals, Canada defeated Mexico 77–82. In the semi-finals, they were defeated by Brazil 86–76. They ended the tournament finishing in 4th place, after a narrow 84–80 loss to the United States, in the third place game. Dalano Banton, one of the standouts of the tournament, was named to the All-Tournament Team.

On June 27, 2023, Sacramento Kings assistant coach Jordi Fernández was hired to replace Nick Nurse as Team Canada's head coach.

Leading up to the 2023 FIBA World Cup, Canada Basketball announced a five-game exhibition series where they would play matches in Germany and Spain, against some of the top nations in the world. Canada finished the exhibition tour with a 3–2 record, which included wins over Germany and Spain, both of which were higher-ranked.

Canada carried their form into the group phase of the World Cup, defeating France 95–65 in the opening match. Canada finished the first group phase with a 3–0 record, and a +111 point differential, following large wins over Lebanon and Latvia. However, the team suffered their first loss of the tournament to Brazil in the first game of the second stage. The loss meant that their next match against world number one ranked Spain, was a game Canada had to win if they hoped to gain an automatic berth at the 2024 Olympics. Shai Gilgeous-Alexander led a fourth quarter comeback from 12 points down, as Canada edged the defending World champions in an 88–85 victory. The win secured a quarter-final spot and Canada's first Olympic berth since 2000. Canada then defeated Slovenia in the quarter-final by a score of 100–89, reaching the semi-finals of the World Cup for the first time. After a loss to Serbia in the semi-final, Canada defeated the United States in the bronze medal game, which went to overtime and concluded 127–118. Dillon Brooks recorded a team-best 39 points in the game, which secured the team's first global championship medal since 1936. Gilgeous-Alexander became the first Canadian to be named to the World Cup All-Tournament Team, while Brooks received the Best Defensive Player award. The team was subsequently named Team of the Year by The Canadian Press.

Canada entered the 2024 Paris Olympics, its first Olympic tournament in 24 years, as one of the favorites for a medal, with its roster including most of its stars from the World Cup as well as additions such as NBA champion Jamal Murray. After a strong unbeaten performance in the group stage with Australia, Spain and Greece, which was deemed the "group of death" by experts, Canada was surprisingly eliminated in the quarterfinals by hosts France. Shai Gilgeous-Alexander was named to the tournament's All-Second Team.

== Competitive record ==
=== Summer Olympics ===
Olympic Games record
| Year | Result | Position | Pld | W | L | PF | PA | PD |
|---|---|---|---|---|---|---|---|---|
| (Germany) 1936 | Silver medalists | 2nd of 23 | 6 | 5 | 1 | 176 | 104 | +72 |
| (United Kingdom) 1948 | 9th place | 9th of 23 | 8 | 6 | 2 | 397 | 313 | +84 |
| (Finland) 1952 | 13th place | 13th of 23 | 6 | 3 | 3 | 404 | 385 | +19 |
| (Australia) 1956 | 9th place | 9th of 15 | 7 | 5 | 2 | 511 | 455 | +56 |
| (Italy) 1960 | Did not qualify | | | | | | | |
| (Japan) 1964 | 14th place | 14th of 16 | 9 | 1 | 8 | 555 | 670 | –115 |
| (Mexico) 1968 | Did not qualify | | | | | | | |
| (West Germany) 1972 | Did not qualify | | | | | | | |
| (Canada) 1976 | 4th place | 4th of 12 | 7 | 4 | 3 | 595 | 611 | –16 |
| (Soviet Union) 1980 | Originally qualified, but withdrew | | | | | | | |
| (United States) 1984 | 4th place | 4th of 12 | 8 | 4 | 4 | 681 | 639 | +42 |
| (South Korea) 1988 | 6th place | 6th of 12 | 6 | 2 | 4 | 552 | 550 | +2 |
| (Spain) 1992 | Did not qualify | | | | | | | |
| (United States) 1996 | Did not qualify | | | | | | | |
| (Australia) 2000 | 7th place | 7th of 12 | 6 | 4 | 2 | 496 | 441 | +55 |
| (Greece) 2004 | Did not qualify | | | | | | | |
| (China) 2008 | Did not qualify | | | | | | | |
| (United Kingdom) 2012 | Did not qualify | | | | | | | |
| (Brazil) 2016 | Did not qualify | | | | | | | |
| (Japan) 2020 | Did not qualify | | | | | | | |
| (France) 2024 | 5th place | 5th of 12 | 4 | 3 | 1 | 340 | 329 | +11 |
| (United States) 2028 | TBD | | | | | | | |
| Total | 1 medal | 10/22 | 67 | 37 | 30 | 4,707 | 4,497 | +210 |

=== FIBA World Cup ===
| Year | Position | Tournament | Host |
|---|---|---|---|
| 1950 | — | 1950 FIBA World Championship | Buenos Aires, Argentina |
| 1954 | 7 | 1954 FIBA World Championship | Rio de Janeiro, Brazil |
| 1959 | 12 | 1959 FIBA World Championship | Chile |
| 1963 | 11 | 1963 FIBA World Championship | Rio de Janeiro, Brazil |
| 1967 | — | 1967 FIBA World Championship | Uruguay |
| 1970 | 10 | 1970 FIBA World Championship | Yugoslavia |
| 1974 | 8 | 1974 FIBA World Championship | Puerto Rico |
| 1978 | 6 | 1978 FIBA World Championship | Philippines |
| 1982 | 6 | 1982 FIBA World Championship | Colombia |
| 1986 | 8 | 1986 FIBA World Championship | Spain |
| 1990 | 12 | 1990 FIBA World Championship | Argentina |
| 1994 | 7 | 1994 FIBA World Championship | Toronto, Canada |
| 1998 | 12 | 1998 FIBA World Championship | Athens, Greece |
| 2002 | 13 | 2002 FIBA World Championship | Indianapolis, U.S. |
| 2006 | — | 2006 FIBA World Championship | Japan |
| 2010 | 22 | 2010 FIBA World Championship | Turkey |
| 2014 | — | 2014 FIBA World Cup | Spain |
| 2019 | 21 | 2019 FIBA World Cup | China |
| 2023 | Bronze | 2023 FIBA World Cup | Philippines, Japan and Indonesia |
| 2027 | To be determined | 2027 FIBA World Cup | Qatar |
| 2031 | To be determined | 2031 FIBA Basketball World Cup | France |

=== FIBA AmeriCup ===
| Year | Position | Tournament | Host |
|---|---|---|---|
| 1980 | Silver | 1980 Tournament of the Americas | San Juan, Puerto Rico |
| 1984 | Bronze | 1984 Tournament of the Americas | São Paulo, Brazil |
| 1988 | Bronze | 1988 Tournament of the Americas | Montevideo, Uruguay |
| 1989 | 5 | 1989 Tournament of the Americas | Mexico City, Mexico |
| 1992 | 5 | 1992 Tournament of the Americas | Portland, U.S. |
| 1993 | 7 | 1993 Tournament of the Americas | San Juan, Puerto Rico |
| 1995 | 4 | 1995 Tournament of the Americas | Neuquén, Argentina |
| 1997 | 5 | 1997 Tournament of the Americas | Montevideo, Uruguay |
| 1999 | Silver | 1999 Tournament of the Americas | San Juan, Puerto Rico |
| 2001 | Bronze | 2001 Tournament of the Americas | Neuquén, Argentina |
| 2003 | 4 | 2003 Tournament of the Americas | San Juan, Puerto Rico |
| 2005 | 9 | 2005 FIBA Americas Championship | Santo Domingo, Dominican Republic |
| 2007 | 5 | 2007 FIBA Americas Championship | Las Vegas, U.S. |
| 2009 | 4 | 2009 FIBA Americas Championship | San Juan, Puerto Rico |
| 2011 | 6 | 2011 FIBA Americas Championship | Mar del Plata, Argentina |
| 2013 | 6 | 2013 FIBA Americas Championship | Caracas, Venezuela |
| 2015 | Bronze | 2015 FIBA Americas Championship | Mexico City, Mexico |
| 2017 | 8 | 2017 FIBA AmeriCup | Argentina/Colombia/Uruguay |
| 2022 | 4 | 2022 FIBA AmeriCup | Recife, Brazil |
| 2025 | 4 | 2025 FIBA AmeriCup | Managua, Nicaragua |

=== Pan American Games ===
| Year | Position | Tournament | Host |
|---|---|---|---|
| 1951 | — | Basketball at the 1951 Pan American Games | Buenos Aires, Argentina |
| 1955 | — | Basketball at the 1955 Pan American Games | Mexico City, Mexico |
| 1959 | 5 | Basketball at the 1959 Pan American Games | Chicago, U.S. |
| 1963 | 6 | Basketball at the 1963 Pan American Games | São Paulo, Brazil |
| 1967 | 9 | Basketball at the 1967 Pan American Games | Winnipeg, Canada |
| 1971 | 8 | Basketball at the 1971 Pan American Games | Cali, Colombia |
| 1975 | 6 | Basketball at the 1975 Pan American Games | Mexico City, Mexico |
| 1979 | 5 | Basketball at the 1979 Pan American Games | San Juan, Puerto Rico |
| 1983 | 4 | Basketball at the 1983 Pan American Games | Caracas, Venezuela |
| 1987 | 5 | Basketball at the 1987 Pan American Games | Indianapolis, U.S. |
| 1991 | 9 | Basketball at the 1991 Pan American Games | Havana, Cuba |
| 1995 | — | Basketball at the 1995 Pan American Games | Mar del Plata, Argentina |
| 1999 | 5 | Basketball at the 1999 Pan American Games | Winnipeg, Canada |
| 2003 | 7 | Basketball at the 2003 Pan American Games | Santo Domingo, Dominican Republic |
| 2007 | 7 | Basketball at the 2007 Pan American Games | Rio de Janeiro, Brazil |
| 2011 | 6 | Basketball at the 2011 Pan American Games | Guadalajara, Mexico |
| 2015 | Silver | Basketball at the 2015 Pan American Games | Toronto, Canada |
| 2019 | — | Basketball at the 2019 Pan American Games | Lima, Peru |
| 2023 | Withdrew | Basketball at the 2023 Pan American Games | Santiago, Chile |

=== Commonwealth Games ===
- 2018 – Silver (silver)

=== FIBA Diamond Ball ===
- 2000 – 4th place

=== Marchand Continental Championship Cup ===
- 2007 – 3rd place
- 2009 – 3rd place
- 2011 – 4th place
- 2013 – 5th place
- 2015 – Champions (gold)

=== Summer Universiade ===
- 1983 – Gold (gold)
- 1985 – Bronze (bronze)
- 1991 – Silver (silver)
- 1993 – Silver (silver)
- 1995 – Bronze (bronze)
- 1997 – Silver (silver)
- 2003 – Bronze (bronze)
- 2007 – Bronze (bronze)
- 2011 – Silver (silver)

== Results and fixtures ==
Win Loss Fixture

=== 2025 ===
| November 28 2027 FIBA World Cup qualifiers – First round | Bahamas | 75–111 | Canada | Nassau, Bahamas |
| 20:40 UTC−5 | Scoring by quarter: 34–24, 14–24, 17–28, 20–25 |
| | Pts: Bridgewater 15; Rebs: Jones 8 Asts: Bridgewater 12 | Boxscore | Pts: Wiltjer 22; Rebs: three players 6 Asts: Bell-Haynes 7 | Arena: Kendal Isaacs Gymnasium; Attendance: 200; Referees: Julio Anaya (PAN), Carlos Vélez (COL), Orlando Varela (HON) |

| December 1 2027 FIBA World Cup qualifiers – First round | Canada | 94–88 | Bahamas | Toronto, Canada |
| 19:10 UTC−5 | Scoring by quarter: 23–11, 29–25, 23–26, 19–26 |
| | Pts: Bell-Haynes 17; Rebs: Kennedy 6 Asts: Bell-Haynes 10 | Boxscore | Pts: Clarke 20; Rebs: Burrows 7 Asts: Clarke 13 | Arena: Mattamy Athletic Centre; Referees: Omar Bermúdez (MEX), Andrés Bartel (URU), Alan dos Santos (BRA) |

=== 2026 ===
| February 26 2027 FIBA World Cup qualifiers – First round | Puerto Rico | 85–96(OT) | Canada | San Juan, Puerto Rico |
| 20:10 UTC−4 | Scoring by quarter: 23–13, 12–23, 22–23, 25–23, Overtime: 3–14 |
| | Pts: Plummer 22; Rebs: Piñeiro 9 Asts: Piñeiro, Zeigler 5 | Boxscore | Pts: Carr 35; Rebs: Bediako 7 Asts: Carr 9 | Arena: Roberto Clemente Coliseum; Referees: Julio Anaya (PAN), Juan Fernández (ARG), Orlando Varela (HON) |

| March 1 2027 FIBA World Cup qualifiers – First round | Jamaica | 81–97 | Canada | Kingston, Jamaica |
| 18:00 UTC−5 | Scoring by quarter: 19–27, 17–22, 22–29, 23–19 |
| | Pts: De Lattibeaudiere 23; Rebs: De Lattibeaudiere 11; Asts: Thelwell 5 | Boxscore | Pts: Carr 17; Rebs: Bediako 9 Asts: Carr 7 | Arena: National Indoor Sports Centre; Attendance: 3,937; Referees: Daniel García (VEN), Roberto Fernández (CRC), Fernando Leite (BRA) |

| July 3 2027 FIBA World Cup qualifiers – First round | Canada | 110–84 | Puerto Rico | Hamilton, Canada |
| 19:10 UTC−4 | Scoring by quarter: 31–16, 25–22, 27–22, 27–24 |
| | Pts: Gilgeous-Alexander 26; Rebs: three players 5 Asts: Alexander-Walker 7 | Boxscore | Pts: Romero 17; Rebs: Freeman 9 Asts: three players 4 | Arena: TD Coliseum; Attendance: 9,826; Referees: Omar Bermúdez (MEX), Carlos Vélez (COL), Samuel Hidalgo (DOM) |

| July 6 2027 FIBA World Cup qualifiers – First round | Canada | 116–78 | Jamaica | Hamilton, Canada |
| 19:10 UTC−4 | Scoring by quarter: 32–15, 25–25, 32–15, 27–23 |
| | Pts: Brooks 20; Rebs: Wiltjer 5 Asts: Gilgeous-Alexander, R. Nembhard 5 | Boxscore | Pts: Thelwell 25; Rebs: Thompson 8 Asts: Bailey, Thelwell 3 | Arena: TD Coliseum; Attendance: 10,441; Referees: Juan Fernández (ARG), Diego Chiconato (BRA), César Gonçalves (BRA) |

| August 27 2027 FIBA World Cup qualifiers – Second round | Panama | 66–86 | Canada | Panama City, Panama |
| 20:40 UTC−5 | Scoring by quarter: 14–14, 20–23, 17–22, 15–27 |
| | Pts: Rodríguez Jr. 17; Rebs: Romero 8 Asts: Gaskins 9 | Boxscore | Pts: Bell-Haynes 18; Rebs: Birch 8 Asts: Carr 12 | Arena: Roberto Durán Arena; Attendance: 3,890; Referees: Alan dos Santos (BRA), Krishna Domínguez (MEX), Fernando Leite (BRA) |

| August 31 2027 FIBA World Cup qualifiers – Second round | Canada | 97–92 | Argentina | Quebec City, Canada |
| 19:10 UTC−4 | Scoring by quarter: 23–29, 25–24, 25–16, 24–23 |
| | Pts: Alexander-Walker 26; Rebs: Kabengele 11; Asts: Carr 8 | Boxscore | Pts: Laprovíttola 31; Rebs: Bolmaro 7 Asts: Bolmaro, Campazzo 5 | Arena: Centre Vidéotron; Attendance: 12,380; Referees: Omar Bermúdez (MEX), Grant Todey (USA), Diego Chiconato (BRA) |

| November 26 2027 FIBA World Cup qualifiers – Second round | Uruguay | vs. | Canada | Montevideo, Uruguay |
| 19:00 UTC−3 |
| | | Boxscore | | Arena: Antel Arena |

| November 29 2027 FIBA World Cup qualifiers – Second round | Argentina | vs. | Canada | Zárate, Argentina |
| 18:10 UTC−3 |
| | | Boxscore | | Arena: Espacio DAM |

=== 2027 ===
| February 26 2027 FIBA World Cup qualifiers – Second round | Canada | vs. | Panama | Canada |
| --:-- |
| | | Boxscore |

| March 1 2027 FIBA World Cup qualifiers – Second round | Canada | vs. | Uruguay | Canada |
| --:-- |
| | | Boxscore |

== Team ==
=== Current roster ===
For the 2027 FIBA World Cup Qualifiers.

Canada men's national basketball team roster
Players
Coaches

| Pos. | No. | Name | Age – Date of birth | Height | Club | Ctr. |
|---|---|---|---|---|---|---|
| G | | Shai Gilgeous-Alexander | 27 – July 12, 1998 | 1.98 m (6 ft 6 in) | Oklahoma City Thunder | (United States) |
| PG | | Andrew Nembhard | 26 – January 16, 2000 | 1.87 m (6 ft 2 in) | Indiana Pacers | (United States) |
| PG | | Marcus Carr | 27 – June 6, 1999 | 1.85 m (6 ft 1 in) | Virtus Bologna | (Italy) |
| G | | Nate Darling | 26 – August 30, 1998 | 1.90 m (6 ft 3 in) | Élan Chalon | (France) |
| SG | | Aaron Best | 33 – September 1, 1992 | 1.93 m (6 ft 4 in) | Andorra | (Spain) |
| G/F | | Luguentz Dort | 27 – April 19, 1999 | 1.94 m (6 ft 4 in) | Atlanta Hawks | (United States) |
| SG | | Nickeil Alexander-Walker | 27 – September 2, 1998 | 1.96 m (6 ft 5 in) | Atlanta Hawks | (United States) |
| SF | | Dillon Brooks | 30 – January 22, 1996 | 1.98 m (6 ft 6 in) | Phoenix Suns | (United States) |
| PF | | Kyle Wiltjer | 33 – October 20, 1992 | 2.06 m (6 ft 9 in) | Reyer Venezia | (Italy) |
| SF | | Kyshawn George | 22 – December 12, 2003 | 1.94 m (6 ft 4 in) | Washington Wizards | (United States) |
| PF | | Leonard Miller | 22 – November 23, 2003 | 2.00 m (6 ft 7 in) | Chicago Bulls | (United States) |
| SF | | Jackson Rowe | 29 – January 4, 1997 | 1.98 m (6 ft 6 in) | Ironi Ness Ziona B.C. | (Israel) |
| C | | Khem Birch | 33 – September 28, 1992 | 2.06 m (6 ft 9 in) | Aris B.C. | (Greece) |
| C | | Charles Bediako | 24 – March 10, 2002 | 2.11 m (6 ft 11 in) | New Zealand Breakers | (New Zealand) |
| C | | Mfiondu Kabengele | 28 – August 14, 1997 | 2.06 m (6 ft 9 in) | Dubai Basketball | (United Arab Emirates) |
| C | | Thomas Kennedy | 25 – September 1, 2000 | 2.06 m (6 ft 9 in) | London Lions | (United Kingdom) |
| PG | | Ryan Nembhard | 23 – March 10, 2003 | 1.80 m (5 ft 11 in) | Denver Nuggets | (United States) |

Head coach

- (Canada) Gordon Herbert

Assistant coach(es)

- (Canada) Nate Mitchell
- (Canada) Jama Mahlalela

Legend

- (C) Team captain
- Club – describes last
  club before the tournament
- Age – describes age
  on June 28, 2026

=== Depth chart ===
| Pos. | Starting 5 | Bench 1 | Bench 2 | Bench 3 | Inactive |
|---|---|---|---|---|---|
| C | Zach Edey | Mfiondu Kabengele | Thomas Kennedy | Charles Bediako | Khem Birch |
| PF | Leonard Miller | Andrew Wiggins | Will Riley | Kelly Olynyk | Kyle Wiltjer |
| SF | Dillon Brooks | Bennedict Mathurin | Kyshawn George | Luguentz Dort | Jackson Rowe |
| SG | Shai Gilgeous-Alexander | Nickeil Alexander-Walker | RJ Barrett | Nate Darling | Aaron Best |
| PG | Marcus Carr | Cory Joseph | Andrew Nembhard | Ryan Nembhard | Kassius Robertson |

=== Head coaches ===
- Gordon Fuller: 1936
- (Canada) Bob Osborne: 1948
- (Canada) Paul Thomas: 1952
- (Canada) Jim Bulloch: 1954
- (Canada) Lance Hudson: 1956
- (Canada) Fred Collen: 1959
- (United States) Bob Hamilton: 1963
- (Canada) Ruby Richman: 1964
- (Canada) Peter Mullins: 1970
- (United States) Jack Donohue: 1972–1988
- (Canada) Ken Shields: 1989–1994
- (United States) Steve Konchalski: 1995–1998
- (Canada) Jay Triano: 1999–2004
- (Canada) Leo Rautins: 2005–2011
- (Canada) Jay Triano: 2012–2019
- (Canada) Roy Rana: 2017–2019 (interim)
- (Canada) (Finland) Gordon Herbert: 2018 (interim)
- (United States) Nick Nurse: 2019–2023
- (Spain) Jordi Fernández: 2023–2024
- (United States) Nate Mitchell: 2024–2025
- (Canada) (Finland) Gordon Herbert: 2026–present

=== Past rosters ===
1936 Summer Olympics: finished 2nd of 21 teams

Gordon Aitchison, Ian Allison, Arthur Chapman, Charles Chapman, Edward Dawson, Irving Meretsky, Douglas Peden, James Stewart, Malcolm Wiseman were awarded silver medals for having played in at least one match during the tournament. Reserves John Dawson, Alphonse Freer, Donald Grey, Stanley Nantais, Robert Osborne, Thomas Pendlebury, and coach Gordon Fuller were not awarded medals.

1948 Summer Olympics: finished 9th of 23 teams

Ole Bakken, Bill Bell, David Bloomfield, Dave Campbell, Harry Kermode, Bennie Lands, Pat McGeer, Reid Mitchell, Mort Morein, Nev Munro, Bob Scarr, Cy Strulovitch, Sol Tolchinsky, Murray Waxman. (Coach: Bob Osborne)

1952 Summer Olympics: finished 9th of 23 teams

Ralph Campbell, William Coulthard, James Curren, Charles Dalton, William Pataky, Glenn Pettinger, Robert Phibbs, Bernard Pickel, Carl Ridd, Robert Simpson, Harry Wade, George Wearring, Roy Williams. (Player/Coach: Paul Thomas)

1954 FIBA World Championship: finished 7th of 12 teams

Roy Burkett, Ken Callis, George Delkers, Doug Gresham, Herb Olafson, Wally Parobec, Carl Ridd, Andy Spack, Mike Spack, Ralph Watts. (Coach: Jim Bulloch)

1956 Summer Olympics: finished 9th of 15 teams

Ronald Bissett, Doug Brinham, Mel Brown, Bob Burtwell, Edward Lucht, Don Macintosh, John McLeod, Coulter Osborne, Bernard Pickel, Ron Stuart, George Stulac, Ed Wild. (Coach: Lance Hudson)

1959 FIBA World Championship: finished 12th of 13 teams

Doug Brinham, Al Brown, Bob Burtwell, Ed Lucht, Ed Malecki, John McLeod, Peter Mullins, Lance Stephens, Logan Tait, Brian Upson, Ed Wild. (Coach: Fred Collen)

1963 FIBA World Championship: finished 11th of 13 teams

Harry Blacker, Neil Dirom, Gordon Fester, Ken Galanchuk, Bob Inglis, Ken Larsen, Jack Lilja, Bill McDonald, Lance Stephens, Logan Tait, Dave Way, Al West. (Coach: Bob Hamilton)

1964 Summer Olympics: finished 14th of 16 teams

Walter Birtles, John Dacyshyn, Rolly Goldring, Keith Hartley, Barry Howson, Fred Ingaldson, James Maguire, John McKibbon, Warren Reynolds, Ruby Richman, George Stulac, Joe Stulac. (Coach: Ruby Richman)

1970 FIBA World Championship: finished 10th of 13 teams

John Barton, Alex Braiden, John Cassidy, Rod Cox, Bruce Dempster, Barry Howson, Terry MacKay, Bob Molinski, Dave Murphy, Bill Robinson, Derek Sankey, Ron Thorsen. (Coach: Peter Mullins)

1972 Pre-Olympic Basketball Tournament: finished 6th of 12 teams

John Cassidy, Tom Kieswetter, Terry McKay, Jamie Russell, Derek Sankey, Gary Smith, Ron Thorsen, Phil Tollestrup, Tim Tollestrup, Bob Town, Ted Stoesz, Ross Wedlake. (Coach: Jack Donohue)

1974 FIBA World Championship: finished 8th of 14 teams

Alex Devlin, Lars Hansen, Ken McKenzie, Michael Moser, Romel Raffin, George Rautins, Martin Riley, Jamie Russell, Bob Sharpe, Robert Stewart, Phil Tollestrup. (Coach: Jack Donohue)

1976 Summer Olympics: finished 4th of 12 teams

John Cassidy, Alex Devlin, Cameron Hall, Lars Hansen, Romel Raffin, Martin Riley, Bill Robinson, Jamie Russell, Derek Sankey, Bob Sharpe, Phil Tollestrup, Bob Town. (Coach: Jack Donohue)

1978 FIBA World Championship: finished 6th of 14 teams

Steve Atkin, Tom Bishop, John Cassidy, Tom Kappos, Howard Kelsey, Ross Quakenbush, Leo Rautins, Martin Riley, Jamie Russell, Peter Ryan, Jay Triano, Jim Zoet. (Coach: Jack Donohue)

1980 Tournament of the Americas: finished 2nd of 7 teams

Tom Bishop, Reni Dolcetti, Varouj Gurunlian, Howard Kelsey, Perry Mirkovich, Ross Quackenbush, Romel Raffin, Leo Rautins, Martin Riley, Doc Ryan, Jay Triano, Jim Zoet. (Coach: Jack Donohue)

1982 FIBA World Championship: finished 6th of 12 teams

Ron Crevier, Stewart Granger, Gerald Kazanowski, Howard Kelsey, Ken Larson, Dan Meagher, Eli Pasquale, Leo Rautins, Tony Simms, Jay Triano, Bill Wennington, Greg Wiltjer. (Coach: Jack Donohue)

1983 Summer Universiade: finished 1st of 16 teams

Kelly Dukeshire, John Hatch, Gord Herbert, Gerald Kazanowski, Howard Kelsey, Dan Meagher, Eli Pasquale, Tony Simms, Karl Tilleman, Jay Triano, Bill Wennington, Greg Wiltjer. (Coach: Jack Donohue)

1984 Tournament of the Americas: finished 3rd of 9 teams

John Hatch, Gord Herbert, Gerald Kazanowski, Howard Kelsey, Dan Meagher, Eli Pasquale, Romel Raffin, Tony Simms, Karl Tilleman, Jay Triano, Bill Wennington, Greg Wiltjer. (Coach: Jack Donohue)

1984 Summer Olympics: finished 4th of 12 teams

John Hatch, Gord Herbert, Gerald Kazanowski, Howard Kelsey, Dan Meagher, Eli Pasquale, Romel Raffin, Tony Simms, Karl Tilleman, Jay Triano, Bill Wennington, Greg Wiltjer. (Coach: Jack Donohue)

1986 FIBA World Championship: finished 8th of 24 teams

Gerry Besselink, John Hatch, Gord Herbert, Gerald Kazanowski, Howard Kelsey, Barry Mungar, Dan Meagher, Eli Pasquale, Tony Simms, Jay Triano, David Turcotte, Greg Wiltjer. (Coach: Jack Donohue)

1988 Tournament of the Americas: finished 3rd of 7 teams

Barry Bekkedam, Norm Clarke, John Hatch, Alan Kristmanson, Barry Mungar, Eli Pasquale, Romel Raffin, Karl Tilleman, Jay Triano, David Turcotte, Wayne Yearwood, Dwight Walton. (Coach: Jack Donohue)

1988 Summer Olympics: finished 6th of 12 teams

Norm Clarke, John Hatch, Gerald Kazanowski, Alan Kristmanson, Barry Mungar, Eli Pasquale, Romel Raffin, Karl Tilleman, Jay Triano, David Turcotte, Wayne Yearwood, Dwight Walton. (Coach: Jack Donohue)

1989 Tournament of the Americas: finished 5th of 10 teams

Cord Clemons, Stewart Granger, John Karpis, Gerald Kazanowski, Alan Kristmanson, Spencer McKay, Phil Ohl, Eli Pasquale, Rob Samuels, Tony Simms, Leo Rautins, David Turcotte. (Coach: Ken Shields)

1990 FIBA World Championship: finished 11th of 16 teams

Rick Fox, Stewart Granger, J.D. Jackson, Gerald Kazanowski, Martin Keane, Dan Meagher, Phil Ohl, Eli Pasquale, Tony Simms, Andrew Steinfeld, Dwight Walton, Jim Zoet. (Coach: Ken Shields)

1992 Tournament of the Americas: finished 5th of 10 teams

J.D. Jackson, Martin Keane, Gerald Kazanowski, Al Kristmanson, Ronn McMahon, Phil Ohl, Leo Rautins, Mike Smrek, Jay Triano, David Turcotte, Bill Wennington, Trevor Williams, Greg Wiltjer. (Coach: Ken Shields)

1993 Tournament of the Americas: finished 7th of 10 teams

Rowan Barrett, Jeff Foreman, Kory Hallas, Cordell Llewellyn, Ronn McMahon, Steve Nash, William Njoku, David Turcotte, Sean Van Koughnett, Joey Vickery, Dwight Walton, Rob Wilson (Coach: Ken Shields)

1994 FIBA World Championship: finished 7th of 16 teams

Rick Fox, Kory Hallas, J.D. Jackson, Martin Keane, Spencer McKay, Ronn McMahon, Steve Nash, William Njoku, Mike Smrek, Joey Vickery, Dwight Walton, Greg Wiltjer. (Coach: Ken Shields)

1995 Tournament of the Americas: finished 4th of 10 teams

Bobby Allen, Phil Dixon, Kory Hallas, Sherman Hamilton, Martin Keane, Michael Meeks, Steve Nash, William Njoku, Joey Vickery, Dwight Walton, Greg Wiltjer, Wayne Yearwood. (Coach: Steve Konchalski)

1997 Tournament of the Americas: finished 5th of 10 teams

Rowan Barrett, Pascal Fleury, Sherman Hamilton, Martin Keane, Michael Meeks, Steve Nash, William Njoku, Eli Pasquale, Peter Van Elswyk, Joey Vickery, Rob Wilson, Wayne Yearwood. (Coach: Steve Konchalski)

1998 FIBA World Championship: finished 12th of 16 teams

Rowan Barrett, David Daniels, Greg Francis, Peter Guarasci, Kory Hallas, Sherman Hamilton, Martin Keane, Todd MacCulloch, Michael Meeks, Greg Newton, William Njoku, Joey Vickery. (Coach: Steve Konchalski)

1999 Tournament of the Americas: finished 2nd of 10 teams

Richard Elias Anderson, Rowan Barrett, Peter Guarasci, Sherman Hamilton, Andrew Mavis, Todd MacCulloch, Jordie McTavish, Michael Meeks, Steve Nash (Tournament MVP), Greg Newton, Shawn Swords, Keith Vassell (Coach: Jay Triano)

2000 Summer Olympics: finished 7th of 12 teams

Rowan Barrett, David Daniels, Greg Francis, Peter Guarasci, Sherman Hamilton, Eric Hinrichsen, Todd MacCulloch, Andrew Mavis, Michael Meeks, Steve Nash, Greg Newton, Shawn Swords. (Coach: Jay Triano)

2001 Tournament of the Americas: finished 3rd of 10 teams

David Daniels, Peter Guarasci, Sherman Hamilton, Kevin Jobity, Prosper Karangwa, Andrew Kwiatkowski, Todd MacCulloch, Michael Meeks, Steve Nash, Jerome Robinson, Shawn Swords, Dean Walker. (Coach: Jay Triano)

2002 FIBA World Championship: finished 13th of 16 teams

Richard Elias Anderson, Rowan Barrett, Titus Channer, Sherman Hamilton, Kevin Jobity, Prosper Karangwa, Michael Meeks, Greg Meldrum, Steve Ross, Shawn Swords, Dave Thomas, Novell Thomas. (Coach: Jay Triano)

2003 Tournament of the Americas: finished 4th of 10 teams

Rowan Barrett, Denham Brown, Greg Francis, Peter Guarasci, Prosper Karangwa, Mike King, Andrew Kwiatkowski, Steve Nash (Tournament MVP), Greg Newton, Novell Thomas, Jesse Young. (Coach: Jay Triano)

2005 FIBA Americas Championship: finished 9th of 10 teams

Jermaine Anderson, Richard Elias Anderson, Denham Brown, Jermaine Bucknor, Nathan Doornekamp, Carl English, James Gillingham, Kevin Jobity, Levon Kendall, Vidal Massiah, Juan Mendez, Randall Nohr. (Coach: Leo Rautins)

2007 FIBA Americas Championship: finished 5th of 10 teams

Jermaine Anderson, Ryan Bell, Denham Brown, Samuel Dalembert, Carl English, Olu Famutimi, Levon Kendall, Vladimir Kuljanin, Juan Mendez, Andy Rautins, David Thomas, Jesse Young. (Coach: Leo Rautins)

2008 FIBA World Olympic Qualifying Tournament for Men: finished 5th of 8 teams

Jermaine Anderson, Joel Anthony, Rowan Barrett, Ransford Brempong, Samuel Dalembert, Aaron Doornekamp, Carl English, Olu Famutimi, Levon Kendall, Tyler Kepkay, Andy Rautins, David Thomas. (Coach: Leo Rautins)

2009 FIBA Americas Championship: finished 4th of 10 teams

Jermaine Anderson, Joel Anthony, Ryan Bell, Jermaine Bucknor, Aaron Doornekamp, Carl English, Olu Famutimi, Levon Kendall, Tyler Kepkay, Kyle Landry, Andy Rautins, Jesse Young. (Coach: Leo Rautins)

2010 FIBA World Championship: finished 22nd of 24 teams

Jermaine Anderson, Joel Anthony, Ryan Bell, Denham Brown, Jermaine Bucknor, Aaron Doornekamp, Olu Famutimi, Levon Kendall, Kelly Olynyk, Andy Rautins, Robert Sacre, Jevohn Shepherd. (Coach: Leo Rautins)

2011 FIBA Americas Championship: finished 6th of 10 teams

Jermaine Anderson, Joel Anthony, Denham Brown, Aaron Doornekamp, Carl English, Jeff Ferguson, Cory Joseph, Levon Kendall, Kelly Olynyk, Andy Rautins, Jevohn Shepherd, Jesse Young. (Coach: Leo Rautins)

2013 FIBA Americas Championship: finished 6th of 10 teams

Jermaine Anderson, Joel Anthony, Junior Cadougan, Aaron Doornekamp, Brady Heslip, Cory Joseph, Devoe Joseph, Levon Kendall, Andrew Nicholson, Andy Rautins, Jevohn Shepherd, Tristan Thompson. (Coach: Jay Triano)

2015 Pan American Games: finished 2nd of 8 teams

Anthony Bennett, Sim Bhullar, Dillon Brooks, Junior Cadougan, Aaron Doornekamp, Melvin Ejim, Carl English, Brady Heslip, Daniel Mullings, Jamal Murray, Andrew Nicholson, Kyle Wiltjer. (Coach: Jay Triano)

2015 FIBA Americas Championship: finished 3rd of 10 teams

Anthony Bennett, Aaron Doornekamp, Melvin Ejim, Brady Heslip, Cory Joseph, Andrew Nicholson, Kelly Olynyk, Dwight Powell, Robert Sacre, Philip Scrubb, Nik Stauskas, Andrew Wiggins. (Coach: Jay Triano)

2016 FIBA World Olympic Qualifying Tournament – Manila: finished 2nd of 6 teams

Joel Anthony, Anthony Bennett, Khem Birch, Melvin Ejim, Tyler Ennis, Shai Gilgeous-Alexander, Brady Heslip, Cory Joseph, Levon Kendall, Philip Scrubb, Thomas Scrubb, Tristan Thompson. (Coach: Jay Triano)

2017 FIBA AmeriCup: finished 8th of 12 teams

Richard Amardi, Jermaine Anderson, Joel Anthony, Murphy Burnatowski, Junior Cadougan, Ammanuel Diressa, Grandy Glaze, Olivier Hanlan, Brady Heslip, Andrew Nicholson, Dyshawn Pierre, Xavier Rathan-Mayes. (Coach: Roy Rana)

2019 FIBA Basketball World Cup: finished 21st of 32 teams

Khem Birch, Melvin Ejim, Brady Heslip, Cory Joseph, Kaza Kajami-Keane, Owen Klassen, Conor Morgan, Andrew Nembhard, Kevin Pangos, Phil Scrubb, Thomas Scrubb, Kyle Wiltjer. (Coach: Nick Nurse)

2020 FIBA Men's Olympic Qualifying Tournaments – Victoria: finished 3rd of 6 teams

Nickeil Alexander-Walker, RJ Barrett, Trae Bell-Haynes, Anthony Bennett, Aaron Doornekamp, Luguentz Dort, Cory Joseph, Trey Lyles, Mychal Mulder, Andrew Nicholson, Dwight Powell, Andrew Wiggins. (Coach: Nick Nurse)

2022 FIBA AmeriCup: finished 4th of 12 teams

Jahvon Blair, Maurice Calloo, Trae Bell-Haynes, Jaylen Babb-Harrison, Kadre Gray, Devonte Bandoo, Kalif Young, Abu Kigab, Chad Posthumus, Lloyd Pandi, Dalano Banton, Thomas Kennedy. (Coach: Nate Mitchell)

2023 FIBA Basketball World Cup: finished 3rd of 32 teams

Luguentz Dort, Nickeil Alexander-Walker, Shai Gilgeous-Alexander, Melvin Ejim, Dwight Powell, RJ Barrett, Kyle Alexander, Kelly Olynyk, Zach Edey, Philip Scrubb, Dillon Brooks, Trae Bell-Haynes. (Coach: Jordi Fernández)

2024 Summer Olympics: finished 5th of 12 teams

Luguentz Dort, Nickeil Alexander-Walker, Shai Gilgeous-Alexander, Melvin Ejim, Jamal Murray, Dwight Powell, Trey Lyles, RJ Barrett, Kelly Olynyk, Andrew Nembhard, Dillon Brooks, Khem Birch. (Coach: Jordi Fernández)

== See also ==
- Canada women's national basketball team
- Canada national under-19 basketball team
- Canada national under-17 basketball team
- Basketball in Canada
