= Canada Basketball =

Governing body for basketball in Canada

- Formation: 1923; 103 years ago
- Type: National Governing Body (NGB)
- Location: Toronto, Ontario
- Region served: Canada
- Official language: English; French
- CEO: Michael Bartlett
- Key people: Rowan Barrett (GM); Steve Nash (senior advisor)
- Affiliations: FIBA; FIBA Americas
- Website: basketball.ca

Canada Basketball is the governing body for basketball in Canada. Headquartered in Toronto, Ontario, the federation is a full member of FIBA and governs Canadian basketball at the international, professional, and amateur levels, including: the men's and women's national teams, 3x3 basketball, the Canadian Elite Basketball League, and youth organizations.

== History ==
Founded in 1923, some of the influential Canada Basketball Alumni include Steve Nash, Leo Rautins, Stacey Dales, and Lars Hansen. Canada Basketball launched the Steve Nash Youth Basketball Program in September 2007. Basketball is the fastest growing sport in Canada and attracts many young Canadians from all backgrounds.

In May 2012, Canada Basketball named Steve Nash the General Manager of the Senior Men's National Program. Canada Basketball hired Jay Triano to coach its Senior Men's National Team in August 2012, and hired Lisa Thomaidis as the head coach of the Senior Women's Program in March 2013.

The Council of Excellence is designed to strengthen the game of basketball in Canada as to propel Canadian Basketball back to international prominence. The Council of Excellence includes, Jay Triano, Steve Nash, Maurizio Gherardini, Glen Grunwald, Don McCrae, Kathy Shields, Ken Shields, Steve Konchalski, and Sylvia Sweeney.

On March 5, 2019, Canada Basketball promoted Executive Vice President / Assistant General Manager Rowan Barrett to General Manager, while Steve Nash would transition to a role of Senior Advisor, effective immediately. Barrett's first move was to hire Toronto Raptors head coach Nick Nurse to coach the national men's team at the 2019 FIBA World Cup with the hopes of qualifying for the 2020 Summer Olympics in Tokyo, Japan.

Canada Basketball withdrew its Men's national team from FIBA AmeriCup qualifying games against Cuba on 29 November 2020 and against the US Virgin Islands on 30 November 2020, on the advice of medical experts due to risks posed by the ongoing COVID-19 pandemic. As a consequence, on 20 January 2021 the International Basketball Federation announced sanctions against Canada Basketball consisting of a fine of 160,000 Swiss francs and docking the Men's national team a point in the standings.

On June 27, 2023, Sacramento Kings assistant coach Jordi Fernández was hired to replace Nick Nurse as Team Canada's head coach.

== Canadian Basketball Hall of Fame ==
=== Athletes ===
- Noel Robertson (1978)
- Norman Baker (1979)
- Carl Ridd (1980)
- Phil Tollestrup (1991)
- Jay Triano (1993)
- Debbie Huband (1994)
- Sylvia Sweeney (1994)
- Martin Riley (1995)
- Fred Thomas (1995)
- Nora McDermott (1996)
- Romel Raffin (1996)
- Leo Rautins (1997)
- Chris Critelli (1998)
- Misty Thomas (1998)
- Bill Rogin (1999)
- Bob Houbregs (2000)
- Jamie Russell (2000)
- Joyce Slipp (2000)
- Rita Bell (2001)
- Barry Howson (2001)
- John McKibbon (2001)
- Warren Reynolds (2001)
- Bev Smith (2001)
- Fred Ingaldson (2002)
- Bill Robinson (2002)
- Gino Sovran (2002)
- Patricia Tatham (2002)
- Eli Pasquale (2003)
- Gerald Kazanowski (2005)
- Bill Wennington (2005)
- Lars Hansen (2006)
- Bob Phibbs (2007)
- Andrea Blackwell (2013)
- Bill Coulthard (2013)
- Candace Jirik (2013)
- George Stulac (2015)
- Jim Zoet (2015)
- Todd MacCulloch (2017)
- Karl Tilleman (2024)

=== Builders ===
- James Naismith (1978)
- Norman Gloag (1979)
- Clarence Hollingsworth (1979)
- Edward Patrick Browne (1989)
- Eddie Bowering (2001)
- Alex Fisher (2001)
- Bob Gage (2001)
- Gerry Livingston (2001)
- Hank Tatarchuk (2003)
- Olga Hrycak (2017)
- John Bitove (2022)

=== Coaches ===
- Percy Page (1978)
- Frank Baldwin (1979)
- Paul Thomas (1980)
- Jack Donohue (1992)
- Steve Konchalski (1993)
- Ken Shields (1999)
- James V. Rose (2001)
- John P. Metras (2002)
- Jack Kenyon (2003)
- Kathy Shields (2003)
- Michèle Bélanger (2022)
- Dave Smart (2026)

=== Officials ===
- Kitch McPherson (1979)
- Ted Earley (1992)
- John Willox (1994)
- Fred Horgan (1996)
- Bryan Nicurity (1996)
- Bill Ritchie (1997)
- Al Rae (2000)
- Ernest Quigley (2001)
- John Weiland (2019)

=== Players ===
- Patricia Lawson (2019)
- Dianne Norman (2019)
- Joanne Sargent (2019)
- Mike Smrek (2019)
- Angela Straub (2021)
- Steve Nash (2021)
- Stewart Granger (2021)
- Rick Fox (2022)
- Tony Simms (2022)

=== Teams ===
- Edmonton Commercial Grads (1980)
- 1936 Olympic Ford V8's Team (1981)
- Edmonton Grads (1983)
- 1992–94 Winnipeg Wesman Women's Team (1995)
- 1929–30 UBC Women's Team (2006)
- 1976 Senior Men's Olympic Team (2007)

=== Multiple categories ===
- R. Ruby Richman (1980)
- Darlene Currie (1994)
- Don McCrae (1994)
- Derek Sankey (1994)
- Brian Heaney (1997)
- Ron Foxcroft (1999)
- Hank Biasatti (2001)
- Stanley Nantais (2001)
- Howard Kelsey (2019)
