= 1988 Tournament of the Americas squads =

This article displays the rosters for the participating teams at the 1988 Tournament of the Americas played in Montevideo, Uruguay from May 22 to May 31, 1988.

== Argentina ==
- 4 Raúl Merlo
- 5 Marcelo Richotti
- 6 Luis Villar
- 7 Carlos Raffaelli
- 8 Sebastián Uranga
- 9 Germán Filloy
- 10 Sergio Aispurúa
- 11 Miguel Cortijo
- 12 Jorge Faggiano
- 13 Rubén Scolari
- 14 Esteban Pérez
- 15 Jorge González

- Head coach: (Argentina) Alberto Finguer

== Brazil ==
- 4 Paulinho
- 5 Maury
- 6 Gerson
- 7 Pipoka
- 8 Rolando
- 9 Cadum
- 10 Guerrinha
- 11 Marcel
- 12 Luiz Felipe
- 13 Paulão
- 14 Oscar
- 15 Israel

- Head coach: (Brazil) Ary Ventura Vidal

== Canada ==
- 4 Alan Kristmanson
- 5 David Turcotte
- 6 Eli Pasquale
- 7 Karl Tilleman
- 8 Norman Clarke
- 9 Jay Triano
- 10 Dwight Walton
- 11 John Hatch
- 12 Barry Mungar
- 13 Romel Raffin
- 14 Wayne Yearwood
- 15 Barry Bekkedam

- Head coach: (United States) / (Canada) Jack Donohue

== Mexico ==
- 4 Jorge León
- 5 Antonio Reyes
- 6 Juan Gallardo
- 7 Roberto González
- 8 Enrique González
- 9 Apolonio Torres
- 10 Francisco Siller
- 11 Luis López
- 12 Arturo Sánchez
- 13 José Luis Arroyos
- 14 Benjamín Gómez
- 15 Norberto Mena

- Head coach: (Mexico) Jorge Toussaint

== Puerto Rico ==
- 4 José Ortiz
- 5 Federico López
- 6 Raymond Gause
- 7 Jerry Ocasio
- 8 Jerome Mincy
- 9 Edwin Pellot
- 10 Angelo Cruz
- 11 Ramón Ramos
- 12 Mario Morales
- 13 Edgar de León
- 14 Francisco de León
- 15 Ramón Rivas

- Head coach: (Puerto Rico) Armando Torres

== Uruguay ==
- 4 Adolfo Medrick
- 5 Luis Larrosa
- 6 Luis Pierri
- 7 Hébert Núñez
- 8 Gustavo Szczygielski
- 9 Horacio Perdomo
- 10 Carlos Peinado
- 11 Walter Pagani
- 12 Óscar Moglia
- 13 Álvaro Tito
- 14 Juan Mignone
- 15 Fernando López

- Head coach: (Uruguay) Javier Espíndola

== Venezuela ==
- 4 Carlos Aguilera
- 5 Felice Parisi
- 6 Armando Becker
- 7 Nelson Solórzano
- 8 Rostyn González
- 9 Jamal Elhawi
- 10 José Echenique
- 11 Carl Herrera
- 12 Luis Sosa
- 13 Gabriel Estaba
- 14 Iván Olivares
- 15 Armando Palacios

- Head coach: (Venezuela) Pedro Espinoza

== Bibliography ==
- Mexico 2015 FIBA Americas Championship Guía Histórica 1980–2015 (in Spanish). FIBA. 2015. p. 27–32.
