= 1999 Tournament of the Americas squads =

This article displays the rosters for the participating teams at the 1999 Tournament of the Americas played in San Juan, Puerto Rico from July 14 to July 25, 1999.

== Group A ==
=== Argentina ===
- 4 Luis Scola
- 5 Manu Ginóbili
- 6 Alejandro Montecchia
- 7 Andrés Nocioni
- 8 Lucas Victoriano
- 9 Hugo Sconochini
- 10 Juan Espil
- 11 Sergio Aispurúa
- 12 Leonardo Gutiérrez
- 13 Facundo Sucatzky
- 14 Leandro Palladino
- 15 Gabriel Fernández

- Head coach: (Argentina) Julio Lamas

=== Canada ===
- 4 Jordie McTavish
- 5 Sherman Hamilton
- 6 Andrew Mavis
- 7 Steve Nash
- 8 Shawn Swords
- 9 Rowan Barrett
- 10 Keith Vassell
- 11 Richard Elias Anderson
- 12 Todd MacCulloch
- 13 Peter Guarasci
- 14 Michael Meeks
- 15 Greg Newton

- Head coach: (Canada) Jay Triano

=== Cuba ===
- 4 Ángel Caballero
- 5 Yudi Abreu
- 6 Edel Casanova
- 7 Roberto Amaro
- 8 Héctor Pino
- 9 Roberto Herrera García
- 10 Rabdel Echevarría
- 11 Lázaro Borrell
- 12 Sergio Ferrer
- 13 Eliécer Rojas
- 14 Ángel Núñez
- 15 Amiel Vega

- Head coach: (Cuba) Miguel Calderón Gómez

=== United States ===
- 4 Steve Smith
- 5 Jason Kidd
- 6 Allan Houston
- 7 Richard Hamilton
- 8 Tim Hardaway
- 9 Tom Gugliotta
- 10 Kevin Garnett
- 11 Vin Baker
- 12 Wally Szczerbiak
- 13 Tim Duncan
- 14 Gary Payton
- 15 Elton Brand

- Head coach: (United States) Larry Brown

Assistant coach: Tubby Smith

=== Uruguay ===
- 4 Camilo Acosta
- 5 Enrique Tucuna
- 6 Diego Losada
- 7 Diego Castrillón
- 8 Nicolás Mazzarino
- 9 Gabriel Abratanski
- 10 Jorge Cabrera
- 11 Oscar Moglia
- 12 Gustavo Szczygielski
- 13 Luis Silveira
- 14 Marcel Bouzout
- 15 Juan Manuel Moltedo

- Head coach: (Uruguay) César Somma

== Group B ==
=== Brazil ===
- 4 Marcelinho Machado
- 5 Ratto
- 6 Caio
- 7 Vanderlei
- 8 Sandro Varejão
- 9 Demétrius
- 10 Helinho
- 11 Aylton
- 12 Josuel
- 13 Michel
- 14 Rogério
- 15 Luiz Fernando

- Head coach: (Brazil) Hélio Rubens Garcia

=== Dominican Republic ===
- Derek Baker
- Ricardo Greer
- Ocaris Lenderborg
- Felipe López
- Carlos Martínez
- Rafael Novas
- Carlos Paniagua
- Carlos Payano
- Jaime Peterson
- Soterio Ramírez
- Ricardo Vásquez
- Franklin Western

- Head coach: (Dominican Republic) Miguel Cruzeta

=== Panama ===
- 4 Kevin Daley
- 5 Alfonso Johnson
- 6 Dionisio Gómez
- 7 Maximiliano Gómez
- 8 Anthony Fiss
- 9 Damian Kirkaldy
- 10 Gonzalo Ortiz
- 11 Michael Hicks
- 12 Eric Cárdenas
- 13 Antonio García Murillo
- 14 Jason Wallace
- 15 Ulises Morán

- Head coach: (United States) Terry Layton

=== Puerto Rico ===
- 4 José Ortiz
- 5 Eddie Casiano
- 6 Orlando Santiago
- 7 Carmelo Travieso
- 8 Jerome Mincy
- 9 James Carter
- 10 Edgar Padilla
- 11 Orlando Vega
- 12 Fernando Ortiz
- 13 Sharif Fajardo
- 14 Luis Allende
- 15 Daniel Santiago

- Head coach: (Puerto Rico) Julio Toro

=== Venezuela ===
- 4 Víctor David Díaz
- 5 Harold Keeling
- 6 Ernesto Mijares
- 7 Richard Lugo
- 8 Alex Quiroz
- 9 Óscar Torres
- 10 Alexander Vargas
- 11 Alexander Nelcha
- 12 Vladimir Heredia
- 13 Heberth Bayona
- 14 Armando Becker
- 15 Omar Walcott

- Head coach: (Argentina) Guillermo Vecchio

== Bibliography ==
- Mexico 2015 FIBA Americas Championship Guía Histórica 1980–2015 (in Spanish). FIBA. 2015. p. 81–88.
