= 2001 Tournament of the Americas =

Tournament details
- Host country: Argentina
- City: Neuquén
- Dates: 16–26 August
- Teams: 10
- Venue: 1 (in 1 host city)

Final positions
- Champions: Argentina (1st title)
- Runners-up: Brazil
- Third place: Canada
- Fourth place: Puerto Rico

Tournament statistics
- MVP: (Argentina) Manu Ginóbili
- Top scorer: (Brazil) Marcelinho Machado

The 2001 COPABA Tournament of the Americas, later known as the FIBA Americas Championship and the FIBA AmeriCup (also as the Championship of the Americas for Men), was hosted by Argentina, from 16 August, to 26 August 2001. The games were played at the Estadio Ruca Che, Neuquén. This FIBA AmeriCup was to earn berths at the 2002 FIBA World Championship, in Indianapolis, Indiana, United States. Argentina won the tournament, the country's first AmeriCup championship. The United States performed poorly at this tournament, mainly because it sent in junior players.

== Venue ==
Neuquén	2001 Tournament of the Americas (Argentina)
Estadio Ruca Che	2001 Tournament of the Americas (Argentina)
Capacity: 8,000	2001 Tournament of the Americas (Argentina)

== Qualification ==
- North America: Canada, United States
- Caribbean and Central America:Mexico, Panama, Puerto Rico, Virgin Islands
- South America: Argentina, Brazil, Uruguay, Venezuela

The draw split the tournament into two groups:

Group A

Canada
Mexico
Panama
Puerto Rico
Virgin Islands

Group B

Argentina
Brazil
United States
Uruguay
Venezuela

== Format ==
- The top four teams from each group advance to the quarterfinals.
- Results and standings among teams within the same group are carried over.
- The top four teams at the quarterfinals advance to the semifinals (1 vs. 4, 2 vs. 3).
- The top five teams from the quarterfinals stage were granted berths in the 2002 FIBA World Championship in Indianapolis. Since the United States were already qualified as Olympic Champions, should they reach the semifinals stage, the sixth-best team from the quarterfinals also qualified to the World Championship.
- The winners in the knockout semifinals advance to the Final. The losers figure in a third-place playoff.

== Preliminary round ==
Qualified for the quarterfinals

=== Group A ===
Team	Pld	W	L	PF	PA	PD	Pts
Puerto Rico	4	4	0	427	368	+59	8
Canada	4	3	1	399	372	+27	7
Panama	4	2	2	361	400	−39	6
Virgin Islands	4	1	3	362	364	−2	5
Mexico	4	0	4	362	407	−45	4

16 August

Canada	108–97 (OT)	Virgin Islands

Estadio Ruca Che, Neuquén

16 August

Puerto Rico	117–80	Panama

Estadio Ruca Che, Neuquén

17 August

Mexico	106–109	Panama

Estadio Ruca Che, Neuquén

17 August

Puerto Rico	101–98	Canada

Estadio Ruca Che, Neuquén

18 August

Panama	90–88	Virgin Islands

Estadio Ruca Che, Neuquén

18 August

Mexico	97–110	Puerto Rico

Estadio Ruca Che, Neuquén

19 August

Panama	82–89	Canada

Estadio Ruca Che, Neuquén

19 August

Virgin Islands	84–67	Mexico

Estadio Ruca Che, Neuquén

20 August

Canada	104–92	Mexico

Estadio Ruca Che, Neuquén

20 August

Virgin Islands	93–99	Puerto Rico

Estadio Ruca Che, Neuquén

=== Group B ===
Team	Pld	W	L	PF	PA	PD	Pts
Argentina	4	4	0	409	303	+106	8
Brazil	4	3	1	396	342	+54	7
Venezuela	4	2	2	360	346	+14	6
Uruguay	4	1	3	315	377	−62	5
United States	4	0	4	323	435	−112	4

16 August

United States	78–116	Brazil

Estadio Ruca Che, Neuquén

16 August

Argentina	103–63	Uruguay

Estadio Ruca Che, Neuquén

17 August

Brazil	92–89	Venezuela

Estadio Ruca Che, Neuquén

17 August

Argentina	108–69	United States

Estadio Ruca Che, Neuquén

18 August

Venezuela	107–83	United States

Estadio Ruca Che, Neuquén

18 August

Uruguay	67–90	Brazil

Estadio Ruca Che, Neuquén

19 August

United States	93–104	Uruguay

Estadio Ruca Che, Neuquén

19 August

Argentina	90–73	Venezuela

Estadio Ruca Che, Neuquén

20 August

Uruguay	81–91	Venezuela

Estadio Ruca Che, Neuquén

20 August

Argentina	108–98 (OT)	Brazil

Estadio Ruca Che, Neuquén

== Quarterfinal group ==
Qualified for the semifinals
Fifth place

The top four teams in both Group A and Group B advanced to the quarterfinal group. Then, each team played the four from the other group once to complete a full round robin. Records from the preliminary groups carried over.

Team	Pld	W	L	PF	PA	PD	Pts
Argentina	7	7	0	687	526	+161	14
Brazil	7	5	2	643	587	+56	12
Puerto Rico	7	5	2	670	622	+48	12
Canada	7	4	3	649	620	+29	11
Venezuela	7	4	3	657	621	+36	11
Panama	7	4	3	656	674	−18	11
Virgin Islands	7	1	6	612	679	−67	8
Uruguay	7	0	7	523	689	−166	7

21 August

Canada	108–100	Venezuela

Estadio Ruca Che, Neuquén

21 August

Brazil	94–102	Panama

Estadio Ruca Che, Neuquén

21 August

Puerto Rico	90–70	Uruguay

Estadio Ruca Che, Neuquén

21 August

Argentina	98–77	Virgin Islands

Estadio Ruca Che, Neuquén

22 August

Uruguay	77–101	Canada

Estadio Ruca Che, Neuquén

22 August

Virgin Islands	69–92	Brazil

Estadio Ruca Che, Neuquén

22 August

Venezuela	89–98	Puerto Rico

Estadio Ruca Che, Neuquén

22 August

Argentina	115–87	Panama

Estadio Ruca Che, Neuquén

23 August

Venezuela	91–75	Virgin Islands

Estadio Ruca Che, Neuquén

23 August

Panama	101–74	Uruguay

Estadio Ruca Che, Neuquén

23 August

Brazil	89–83 (OT)	Puerto Rico

Estadio Ruca Che, Neuquén

23 August

Argentina	85–76	Canada

Estadio Ruca Che, Neuquén

24 August

Virgin Islands	113–91	Uruguay

Estadio Ruca Che, Neuquén

24 August

Panama	92–106	Venezuela

Estadio Ruca Che, Neuquén

24 August

Canada	69–78	Brazil

Estadio Ruca Che, Neuquén

24 August

Argentina	95–70	Puerto Rico

Estadio Ruca Che, Neuquén

== Knockout stage ==
Semi-finals
25 August
Brazil	98
Puerto Rico	94
25 August
Argentina	97
Canada	76

Final
26 August
Brazil	59
Argentina	78
Third place
26 August
Puerto Rico	95
Canada	102

== Awards ==
- Topscorer: (Brazil) Marcelinho Machado 172 pts

2001 Tournament of the Americas winners

Argentina
First title

Most Valuable Player
(Argentina) Manu Ginóbili

== Final standings ==
Qualified for the 2002 FIBA World Championship
Qualified for the 2002 FIBA World Championship as Olympic Champions and hosts

Rank	Team	Record
1st place, gold medalist(s)	Argentina	10–0
2nd place, silver medalist(s)	Brazil	7–3
3rd place, bronze medalist(s)	Canada	6–4
4	Puerto Rico	6–4
5	Venezuela	4–4
6	Panama	4–4
7	Virgin Islands	2–6
8	Uruguay	1–7
9	Mexico	0–4
10	United States	0–4

1st	2nd	3rd
Argentina Juan Ignacio Sánchez; Gabriel Fernández; Manu Ginóbili; Fabricio Oberto; Lucas Victoriano; Daniel Farabello; Hugo Sconochini; Luis Scola; Leonardo Gutiérrez; Andrés Nocioni; Leandro Palladino; Rubén Wolkowyski	Brazil Marcelinho Machado; Alex Garcia; Vanderlei Mazzuchini; Tiago Valentim de Lima; Sandro França Varejão; Demétrius Ferraciú; Hélio Rubens Filho; Estevam Ferreira; Guilherme Giovannoni; Nenê; Anderson Varejão; Márcio Dornelles	Canada David Daniels; Sherman Hamilton; Dean Walker; Steve Nash; Shawn Swords; Prosper Karangwa; Jerome Robinson; Todd MacCulloch; Andrew Kwiatkowski; Peter Guarasci; Michael Meeks; Kevin Jobity
