= Basketball at the 1983 Summer Universiade =

Basketball events were contested at the 1983 Summer Universiade in Edmonton, Alberta, Canada.

Event	Gold	Silver	Bronze
Men's basketball	Canada (CAN); Kelly Dukeshire; John Hatch; Gordon Herbert; Gerald Kazanowski; Howard Kelsey; Danny Meagher; Eli Pasquale; Tony Simms; Karl Tilleman; Jay Triano; Bill Wennington; Greg Wiltjer	Yugoslavia (YUG) (partial roster); Goran Grbović; Marko Ivanović; Velimir Perasović; Dražen Petrović; Rajko Žižić	United States (USA); Charles Barkley; Greg Cavener; Johnny Dawkins; Devin Durrant; Andre Goode; Jay Humphries; Karl Malone; Ed Pinckney; Malcolm Thomas; Bernard Thompson; Eric Turner; Kevin Willis
Women's basketball	United States (USA)	Romania (ROU)	Yugoslavia (YUG)
