= Kristmanson =

Kristmanson is a surname. Notable people with the surname include:

- Alan Kristmanson (born 1961), Canadian basketball player
- Kyrie Kristmanson (born 1989 or 1990), Canadian singer-songwriter and musician
