= Trevor C. Williams =

Canadian basketball player

Trevor C. Williams (born 1965 in Montreal, Quebec) is a retired Canadian basketball player.

Williams is a former member of the Canadian national men's basketball team and currently the Head Coach of the Dawson College Women's Division One basketball team in Montreal, which won a provincial championship in 2002. He attended Southern University in Louisiana, United States where he was a teammate of former NBA player and former New Jersey Nets head coach, Avery Johnson. He also attended St. Peter's College in New Jersey on a basketball scholarship, and in his fifth and final year of eligibility, he returned to Montreal to play basketball for Concordia University Stingers, (1989-1990 season).

During his playing days as a point guard in the city of Montreal, he played at Westmount High School, and later at Dawson College for the Blues, AAA basketball team, with friends and teammates Wayne Yearwood and Dwight Walton. His quickness, speed, and jumping ability were outstanding and were demonstrated when he played for Team Canada against the original USA Dream Team (Dream Team I) of basketball in the 1992 Tournament of the Americas, which took place in Portland, Oregon.

In 1993, he founded the Trevor Williams basketball camp, and in 2002 he founded the Trevor Williams Kids Foundation to help troubled inner-city youth of the city of Montreal.

== See also ==
- List of Montreal athletes
