= Jermaine Bucknor =

Canadian basketball player

Charlotte Hornets
- Title: Assistant coach
- League: NBA

Personal information
- Born: November 1, 1983 (age 43) Edmonton, Alberta, Canada
- Listed height: 6 ft 7 in (2.01 m)
- Listed weight: 205 lb (93 kg)

Career information
- High school: Ross Sheppard (Edmonton, Alberta)
- College: Richmond (2002–2006)
- NBA draft: 2006: undrafted
- Playing career: 2006–2021
- Position: Small forward

Career history

Playing
- 2006: Limoges CSP
- 2006–2007: Polpak Świecie
- 2007–2008: ESSM Le Portel
- 2008: Edmonton Chill
- 2008–2009: Stade Clermontois BA
- 2009: AMSB
- 2009–2010: Stade Clermontois BA
- 2010–2011: Skyliners Frankfurt
- 2011: Club 9 de Julio Río Tercero
- 2011–2012: Libertad de Sunchales
- 2012: s.Oliver Baskets
- 2012–2015: TBB Trier
- 2015–2016: Belfius Mons-Hainaut
- 2016–2017: Ciclista Olímpico
- 2017–2021: Gladiators Trier

Coaching
- 2021–2023: Gladiators Trier
- 2023–2024: Boston Celtics (assistant)
- 2024–present: Charlotte Hornets (assistant)

Jermaine Bucknor (born November 1, 1983) is a Canadian professional basketball coach and former player currently working as an assistant coach for the Charlotte Hornets of the National Basketball Association (NBA).

== Career ==
The 6 ft 7 inch Edmonton native played college basketball at the University of Richmond.

Further, he gained experience with the French basketball teams Limoges CSP Elite, Étoile Sportive Saint-Michel Le Portel Côte d'Opale (aka ESSM Le Portel), Aix-Maurienne Savoie Basket and Stade Clermontois Basket Auvergne, and Polish team Polpak Świecie.

Starting in 2012, he played for TBB Trier in the German Basketball Bundesliga. In 2014, he extended his contract with the Trier team for two more years. Following stints in Belgium and Argentina, Bucknor returned to the city of Trier, signing with the Gladiators Trier. Chronic knee pain and a hip injury forced him to retire in June 2021. Bucknor opted to start a career in coaching.

== Coaching career ==
Following retirement, he has started his coaching career by becoming assistant coach for Gladiators Trier of the German ProA.

On July 3, 2024, Bucknor was hired as an assistant coach by the Charlotte Hornets.

== International career ==
Bucknor has represented Canada Basketball for four years and played 25 games with the Canadian National Program. Bucknor last represented Canada at the 2007 Pan American Games where he averaged 7.5 points and 2.8 rebounds in four games played.
