= Wayne Yearwood =

Canadian basketball player (born 1964)

Wayne Yearwood (born September 22, 1964) is a Canadian former professional and Olympic basketball player, who was with the Canadian national team. Born in Montreal, Quebec, he played for Team Canada at the 1988 Summer Olympics in Seoul, South Korea, along with his friend and teammate Dwight Walton, and played seven years with the Canadian national team along with Steve Nash for several years, and eight years playing professionally in Europe. Yearwood played college basketball at Dawson College, with friends and teammates Dwight Walton and Trevor C. Williams. In the United States, he played NCAA Division I college basketball at West Virginia University. He played for two years in Greek Basket League with the colors of Panathinaikos and Apollon Patras. End of the '90 he played in Switzerland for Vevey Basket and Genève Versoix Basket. Yearwood also played football as a wide receiver for West Virginia and was selected by the Calgary Stampeders of the Canadian Football League in the 2nd round of the 1988 CFL draft.

Yearwood is the head coach for the men's Division One basketball team at Dawson College in Montreal since being hired in 2003. During his time with the Dawson Men's Basketball program, coach Yearwood has won the RSEQ provincial championship twice, the most recent being during the 2022–2023 season. Coach Yearwood also led his team to the CCAA National Championship three times and made it to the podium on all three appearances at the tournament. The Dawson Blues have won a gold (2007), a silver (2023) and a bronze (2022) medal at Nationals under coach Yearwood.
