= Martin Keane =

Canadian basketball player

Martin Luther Keane (born July 12, 1969) is a Jamaican-born Canadian former professional basketball forward/center. Keane played in three consecutive FIBA World Championships for the Canada men's national basketball team, played for many professional teams, and is active in coaching.

== Personal ==
Born in Kingston, Keane is the son of Patricia Francis-Keane and Leroy Keane. Keane's father was a member of the Jamaican National Track Team as well as an All-American at the University of Nebraska. Martin Keane attended Northeast Junior College in Nebraska, where he was voted a First Team All-American. He then attended the University of Oklahoma and then graduated from the University of Washington.

== International career ==
Keane played with the Canadian National Team from 1989–2001. Keane was featured in the 1990 FIBA World Championship in (Argentina). He participated in the 1991 Pan American Games in Havana, Cuba. Also in 1991, Keane was a Silver Medalist in the World Student Games in the United Kingdom, losing to Team USA in the finals.

Keane played in the 1994 FIBA World Championship in (Toronto), the Canadian team finishing 7th. Keane participated in the 1998 FIBA World Championship in (Greece).

Keane played for Canada in the 2001 Goodwill Games in Brisbane, Australia.

== Club career ==
Keane first played professional basketball from 1994 to 1995 in Alicante, and then in Tenerife in the Canary Islands. In 1996 Keane was invited to try out for the (NBA) Toronto Raptors by Isaiah Thomas, but was not signed to the team.

Keane then played for Pamesa Valencia ACB in Spain from 1996 to 1997, 1997 to 1998 for Melilla Baloncesto. He returned to the United States that same year to play one season for the Continental Basketball Association (CBA) Quad City Thunder.

In 1999–2000 Keane played for Hitachi Honsha Rising Sun in the Japan Basketball League and in 2001 for the Basketball Bundesliga in Germany. In 2002 he played for Bahrain in The Asian Championship (Dubai). Keane returned to Spain (LEB) with Ferrol 2002–03 Ranked #1 all year, (LEB) Burgos 2003–04 finalists and (LEB) Castellón 2004. In 2004 Keane returned to Canada to play for the Barrie Bandits of the Ontario Professional Basketball League.

After playing in Uruguay in 2005 with the Salto Basketball Club, Keane retired from playing professional basketball.

== Managerial career ==
Since 2005, Keane has been coaching in South America, the United States and China. Keane was voted Coach of the Year in 2012 and 2013 at two different basketball academies in Beijing.

Also in 2013, Keane briefly returned to playing basketball for a Red Bull basketball tournament in China. At age 44, Keane averaged 14 points, 14 rebounds and 5 assists during the tournament and his team went to the final rounds.

== Community service ==
Keane is an Honorary Advisor to basketball boards in Canada, China, and Spain. He has served as a foster parent with the Canadian Children's Aid Society for ten boys.

On August 12, 2015, Keane was named Honorary CEO of Matik Media Enterprises Magazine.

== Sources ==
- USBASKET
- basket stats
- sportsillustrated.cnn.com
- "THE TOP 20". The New York Times. November 18, 1990.
- http://www.chebucto.ns.ca
- laurierathletics.com
- goodwillgames.com
