= Ron Thorsen =

Canadian basketball player and coach

Personal information
- Born: 13 April 1948 Hollister, California, U.S.
- Died: 1 December 2005 (aged 57) Everett, Washington, U.S.
- Listed height: 6 ft 1 in (1.85 m)

Career information
- High school: Prince George, British Columbia
- College: University of British Columbia (1967–1972)
- NBA draft: 1973: 19th round, 209th overall pick
- Drafted by: Buffalo Braves
- Position: Point guard
- Number: 15, 23, 10, 7

Career highlights
- As player: Captain of the Canada men's national basketball team; 3× CIAU First Team All-Canadian (1970, 1971, 1972); Set UBC records for most points in a game (48), season points per game (20.3) and total season points (650) in 1969-70 season; Set CIAU and UBC records for career points (2,059); Set UBC record for career points per game (19.1); CIAU Tournament MVP (1970); CIAU Tournament All-star (1970); BC University Athlete of the Year (1972); 2x CIAU national champion (1970, 1972); 2x WCIAA First Team All-star (1970, 1971); CWUAA First Team All-star (1972); UBC Graduating Athlete of the Year (1972); BC High School MVP (1967); 2x BC High School All-star; As coach: CIAU women's national champion (1973)
- Stats at Basketball Reference

Ronald Albert Thorsen (13 April 1948 – 1 December 2005) was a Canadian basketball player and coach. Among his many accomplishments, he was captain of the Canada men's national basketball team in the 1970s; was a three-time Canadian university ("CIAU") First Team All-Canadian; broke multiple CIAU and University of British Columbia ("UBC") scoring records; is the only UBC player to be drafted in the NBA; and was a three-time CIAU national champion, twice as a player (1970, 1972) and once while coaching the UBC women's team (1973).

== High school ==
Thorsen played at the high school level in Prince George, BC. Thorsen was a two-time BC high school all-star and the BC high school MVP (1967).

== University ==
Thorsen played for UBC for five seasons from 1967 to 1972. In his freshman season, he received the inaugural John Owen bursary and was lauded for all-around citizenship by then-federal cabinet member and later prime minister John Turner.

During his time at UBC, Thorsen was three-time First Team All-Canadian. Only 17 other athletes in Canadian university basketball history were three-time First Team All-Canadians. For context, there have been more season MVPs in Canadian university basketball than three-time First Team All-Canadians.

In the 1969–70 season, Thorsen set the UBC records for most points in a single game (48), highest season points per game (20.3) and most total season points (650). His single-game points record is notable because he did so while only playing three quarters of the game. Then, in the 1972 season, he tied his own record for most points in a single season, with this record standing for 14 years.

Thorsen was named the CIAU national tournament MVP and an CIAU national tournament all-star in 1970. Thorsen was also named the BC University Athlete of the year in 1972.

Thorsen was named a First Team conference all-star three times (1970, 1971, 1972). In 1970 and 1971, Thorsen was named a Western Canadian Intercollegiate Athletic Association ("WCIAA") all-star; in 1972 when the conference was split into the Canada West Universities Athletic Association ("CWUAA") conference and the Great Plains Athletic Association ("GPAA") conference, he was named a CWUAA all-star. In 1971, he was the only unanimous conference all-star. Additionally, in 1972 Thorsen was named UBC's graduating athlete of the year.

Upon graduating, Thorsen set both the CIAU and UBC records for total career points (2,059). He also set the UBC record for career points per game (19.1). His UBC records for career points per game and career points stood for 18 years.

Under Thorsen's leadership, UBC won two national championships in three years (1970, 1972). In 1970, the Thunderbirds went undefeated in Canadian play. In 1970, the Thunderbirds easily won the championship game against McMaster University 96–75. These are the only national championships in program history.

The Thunderbirds also won the conference championship in 1970 and 1972 and were the conference championship runner-up in 1971.

== Professional ==
Thorsen was drafted by the Buffalo Braves in the 1973 NBA Draft as the 209th overall pick. Thorsen is the only UBC player to be drafted in the NBA.

== International career ==
Thorsen played for the Canadian national team in the 1970s, beginning in 1972. He served as captain of the team. Thorsen represented Canada in the Pan American Games, the FIBA World Championship, the World Student Games and the Pre-Olympic Tournament.

Specifically, in the 1970 World Championship, Thorsen was Canada's third-leading scorer with 12.4 points per game. His highest-scoring game in this tournament occurred against Australia when he led all scorers with 26 points. He was also Canada's second leading scorer in their games against Korea and Panama, where he scored 18 and 13 points, respectively. Additionally, in the 1972 Pre-Olympic Tournament, he was again Canada's third-leading scorer.

== Coaching career ==
Thorsen coached the UBC women's basketball team in the '70s, where he led the team to win the national championship in 1973. He also coached and taught in British Columbia in the years preceding his death.

== Post-career recognition ==
Thorsen has been inducted into the Canada West Hall of Fame (2022), the Basketball BC Hall of Fame (2006), the UBC Sports Hall of Fame (in its inaugural 1993 class) and into the Prince George Sports Hall of Fame (1999).

== Personal life / death ==
Thorsen was born in Hollister, California and raised in San Jose, California. Thorsen moved to Prince George, BC in 1965 after his father elected to spend his retirement there. Thorsen earned bachelor's and master's degrees in physical education.

Thorsen died in early December 2005 at the age of 56.
