= Warren Reynolds =

Canadian basketball player

Personal information
- Born: 26 May 1936 (age 90) Winnipeg, Manitoba, Canada

Career information
- High school: Etobicoke Collegiate Institute (Toronto, Ontario, Canada)
- Position: Forward

Career history
- 195?–196?: Tillsonburg Livingstons
- ?: Toronto Dow Kings

Career highlights
- Canadian Basketball Hall of Fame (2001)

Warren Reynolds (born 26 May 1936) is a Canadian fornmer basketball and squash player. He played for several years with the Canada national team, including at the 1959 Pan American Games and the 1964 Summer Olympics. He was inducted into the Canadian Basketball Hall of Fame in 2001. He played club basketball for the Tillsonburg Livingstons, where he won the Canadian championship in 1960, and the Toronto Dow Kings.

Following his basketball career, Reynolds competed in squash, winning the 45-and-over Canadian national championship in 1982.
