= William Njoku =

Ghanaian-Canadian basketball player

Personal information
- Born: March 5, 1972 (age 54) Accra, Ghana
- Listed height: 6 ft 10 in (2.08 m)
- Listed weight: 250 lb (113 kg)

Career information
- High school: Halifax West (Halifax, Nova Scotia)
- College: Saint Mary's (Halifax)
- NBA draft: 1994: 2nd round, 41st overall pick
- Drafted by: Indiana Pacers
- Playing career: 1993–2007
- Position: Forward

Career history
- 1994–1995: Élan Chalon
- 1995–1996: Jersey Turnpikes
- 1996–1997: Atlantic City Seagulls
- 1997–1998: Beşiktaş
- 1999–2002: Oliveirense
- 2002–2003: KB Bashkimi
- 2003–2004: Eurolines Vilvoorde
- 2004–2005: Rabotnički
- Stats at Basketball Reference

William Chidi Njoku (born March 5, 1972) is a Ghanaian-Canadian former professional basketball player and member of the Canada national men's basketball team.

A 6'9½" forward born in Accra, Ghana, Njoku immigrated to Canada as a four-year-old along with his parents Lawrence and Catherine. He starred for Halifax West High School despite missing most of his senior year through injury. The Warriors consequently did not reach the provincial championship finals tournament in 1990. Will attended hometown Saint Mary's University, where in his junior year (1993) he was winner of the Mike Moser Award as the Canadian Interuniversity Sport's (CIAU) Most Outstanding player. In his junior and senior seasons he was also named a CIAU All-Canadian. Njoku was drafted in the second round of the 1994 NBA draft with the 41st pick overall by the Indiana Pacers.

Failing to make any NBA regular season roster however, Njoku played professionally for the next ten years for various clubs in Europe. He retired in 1999 due to a chronic back ailment, one which was properly diagnosed and successfully treated allowing him to make a comeback to pro ball at age 31 in 2003. This is a mostly complete list of the clubs by year:

- Elan Sportif Chalonnais, (Pro A), 1994
- Jersey Turnpikes, USBL, 1995
- Atlantic City Seagulls, USBL, 1996
- Alba Berlin, Germany, autumn of 1996
- Besiktas, Turkey, 1997
- Illianbum Taka, Portugal, 1998
- Oliveirense, Portugal, 1999
- KB Bashkimi, Kosovo, 2003
- Eurolines Vilvoorde, Belgium, 2003–4
- KK Rabotnički, Republic of Macedonia, 2004

Njoku also played in France.

Njoku was a member of the Canadian team at the 1994 FIBA World Championship as well as the 1998 Championship. In 2007, he also played for the Canadian national developmental team in a tournament in Argentina.

Since retiring from playing pro basketball, Njoku has been involved in coaching and motivational speaking. Having lived in Toronto for the off-seasons during much of his playing career, he now resides in Moncton, New Brunswick. He was the Athletics Director at Crandall University from Sept 2007 - Sept 2010, when he left to focus on his motivational speaking company, Will2Win.

== Sources ==
- www.eurobasket.com
- www.basket-stats.info
- www.thedraftreview.com
- www.turkishdailynew.com.tr
- www.espndeportes.espn.go.com
- curtisjphillips.tripod.com
- www.berlinonline.de
- www.will2win.ca
