= Bob Town =

Canadian basketball player

Robert Frederick "Bob" Town (born October 4, 1949) was a member of the Canadian men's national basketball team between 1972 and 1976. Canada finished fourth at the 1976 Summer Olympics.

Born in Winnipeg, Manitoba, Town graduated from Churchill High School. He played college basketball at the University of Manitoba from 1967 and 1972 and was named a CIAU All-Canadian in 1972.

As a member of the national team, Town participated in various European tournaments, the World University Games in Moscow, the Pan Am Games, and the Montreal Olympics.

Town was a member of the St. Andrews Super Saints which won the Canadian Senior Men's Championship both in 1975 and 1976.

Inducted into the Manitoba Sports Hall of Fame and Museum in 2007.

== Sources ==
- www.basketballmanitoba.ca
- Bob Town’s biography at Manitoba Sports Hall of Fame and Museum
