= Jamie Russell =

Canadian basketball player and surgeon

Personal information
- Born: 23 April 1952 (age 74) Niagara Falls, Ontario, Canada
- Listed height: 6 ft 7 in (2.01 m)

Career information
- High school: Nelson High School (Burlington, Ontario)
- College: Colgate University (1971–1975); University of Waterloo (1975-76)
- Position: Power forward
- Number: 11

Career highlights
- CIAU Player of the Year (1976); CIAU First Team All-Canadian (1976); OUAA All-star (1976); OUAA Tournament MVP (1976)

James Russell (born 23 April 1952) is a Canadian basketball player, Olympian and a surgeon. His accomplishments include being the youngest starter for the Canadian men's national basketball team, performing well for Canada in multiple international tournaments, and being named the Canadian university ("CIAU") MVP in 1976. After his basketball career, Russell distinguished himself in the field of general surgery.

== International career ==
Russell played for the Canadian national team from 1972 to 1979. At age 20, he was the youngest starter for the national team.

Russell represented Canada in the 1976 Olympic games. Canada performed well in these Olympics, finishing fourth overall. This and the 1984 Olympics constitute the only occasions in the last 90 years in which Canada has competed for an Olympic medal in basketball. Russell performed well in this tournament, being Canada's 4th leading scorer with 10 ppg and Canada's third leading rebounder with 5 rbg.

Russell represented Canada in many additional international tournaments. Russell played in the 1972 Pre-Olympic Tournament where he was Canada's fourth leading scorer. Russell then competed in the 1973 World Student Games, where Canada finished fourth overall. Russell also competed in the 1974 FIBA World Championship where he performed particularly well, being Canada's leading scorer with 14 ppg.

Russell also participated in the 1975 Intercontinental Cup. In this tournament, Canada achieved its first win against the Soviet Union in basketball, with Russell leading Canada with 26 points.

Russell played in the 1975 Pan American Games and then in the 1977 World Student Games, where Canada finished fourth.

Russell also competed in the 1978 FIBA World Championship where Canada finished 6th overall, with Russell being Canada's fourth leading scorer with 8.9 ppg.

== University ==
Before university, Russell played for Burlington Nelson High School, where he led the team to its first provincial championship.

Russell played for Colgate University from 1971-1975, where he was a starter for three years. Colgate is one of the most selective universities in the United States, which required strong academic performance by Russell prior to admission. Russell led the team in rebounds in each of his seasons at Colgate. In his freshman year, Russell averaged 22 points per game with a 63.7% field goal percentage. In his final season with Colgate, he was co-captain. During his time at Colgate, he scored 927 points and recorded 463 rebounds with a 52% field goal percentage.

In the 1975-76 season, Russell played a 5th year at the University of Waterloo. In 1976, Russell received the inaugural Mike Moser award as the CIAU male basketball player of the year. This year, he was also named a CIAU First Team All-Canadian, Ontario Universities Athletics Association ("OUAA") All-star and as the OUAA tournament MVP.

In this 1975-76 season, Russell led the Waterloo Warriors to a third-place finish in the CIAU tournament. He averaged 23.9 ppg, 10.3 rebounds per game with a 51.8% field goal percentage. He was also named as the MVP of the Naismith Classic as well as the Waterloo team MVP.

After his university career and while playing for the national team, Russell served as an assistant coach at McMaster University from 1976-78.

== Professional/Semi-Pro ==
From 1976-82 and then from 1987–91, Russell was captain of the Toronto Estonia team in the Canada Senior Men's League, where he won 10 Ontario Basketball Association championships and two Canadian league championships.

== Post-career recognition ==
Russell has been inducted into the Canada Basketball Hall of Fame (2000), the Ontario Basketball Hall of Fame (2019), the Colgate University Athletic Hall of Honor (1980) and the city of Burlington Sports Hall of Fame (2016). Also, the 1976 men's national team of which he was part was inducted into the Canada Basketball Hall of Fame (2007).

== Medical career ==
Russell received his medical degree from McMaster University in 1979. He served as assistant coach at McMaster while completing his studies. He completed his residency at McMaster and his fellowship in surgery/critical care medicine at the Maryland Institute for Emergency Medical Services. He is board certified by the American College of Surgeons in Surgery and Surgical Care, a Fellow of the American College of Surgeon, a member of the American Society of General Surgeons and an instructor in Advanced Trauma and Life Support. He is also a clinical assistant professor at the University of Arizona.

== Personal life ==
Russell was born and raised in Burlington, Ontario on 23 April 1952.
