= John McLeod (basketball) =

Canadian basketball player (born 1934)

Personal information
- Nationality: Canadian
- Born: 1 May 1934 (age 90); Vancouver, British Columbia, Canada

Sport
- Sport: Basketball

John McLeod (born 1 May 1934) is a Canadian basketball player. He competed in the men's tournament at the 1956 Summer Olympics.
