= John Cassidy (basketball) =

Canadian basketball player

Personal information
- Born: 9 June 1947 (age 77); Calgary, Alberta, Canada

Sport
- Sport: Basketball

John Richard Cassidy (born 9 June 1947) is a Canadian basketball player. He competed in the men's tournament at the 1976 Summer Olympics.
