= Gabriel Abratanski =

Uruguayan basketball player (born 1975)

Personal information
- Born: February 20, 1975 (age 51)
- Listed height: 6 ft 9 in (2.06 m)
- Listed weight: 253 lb (115 kg)

Career information
- Playing career: 1994–2013
- Position: Center
- Number: 4

Gabriel Abratanski (born February 20, 1975) is an Uruguayan former basketball player.
