= Kelly Dukeshire =

Canadian basketball player

Personal information
- Listed height: 6 ft 6 in (1.98 m)

Career information
- High school: Oak Bay High School (Oak Bay, British Columbia)
- College: University of Victoria (1978–1983)
- Position: Small forward
- Number: 44

Career highlights
- CIAU All-Canadian (1983); CIAU National Tournament MVP (1982); 4x CIAU National Champion (1981-1983); 3× CWUAA All-Star (1981–1983)

Kelly Michael Dukeshire is former Canadian basketball player, CIAU All-Canadian, FISU gold-medalist and four-time CIAU national champion.

== University ==
Dukeshire played basketball for the University of Victoria from 1978-1983 where he and his teammates won four consecutive national championships. In his first year with UVic (before UVic's run of national championships), Dukeshire and his teammates placed second in the CIAU national tournament.

In the 1982 CIAU national tournament, Dukeshire averaged 15.3 points per game and was named the CIAU national tournament MVP. The following year, he was named a CIAU All-Canadian.

Additionally, Dukeshire was recognized three times as a Canada West All-Star (1981 - 1983). In his last three seasons, he averaged 13.2 points per game and 6.7 rebounds per game. Dukeshire never missed a regular season game, playing a total of 90 straight games. Dukeshire has been described as a "high-flying star forward" who "could dunk with anyone".

== International ==
Dukeshire often played for Canada men's national basketball team. Notably, Dukeshire represented Canada in the 1983 FISU World University Games where Canada won the gold medal. In the semifinal match of this tournament, Canada defeated a talented US team led by future NBA hall of famers Charles Barkley and Karl Malone. This 1983 gold medal win constituted one of the finest moments in Canadian basketball history, being the only time in which Canada has won the gold medal in an international basketball tournament.

== Post-career awards ==
Dukeshire was inducted into the University of Victoria Sports Hall of Fame (2009), the Basketball BC Sports Hall of Fame (2010), the Lower Vancouver Island School Sports Hall of Fame and the Oak Bay High School Sports Hall of Fame.

Additionally, the 1979-86 UVic Men's Basketball teams were inducted into the Canada West Hall of Fame (2019-2020 induction class); the 1979-80 UVic team was inducted into the BC Sports Hall of Fame (2020); the 1980-81 UVic team was inducted into the Victoria Sports Hall of Fame; and the 1982-1983 UVic team was inducted into the University of Victoria Sports Hall of Fame (2023), with Dukeshire being recognized as a team member of each of these team inductions.

== Personal life ==
After his basketball career, Dukeshire became an officer with the Saanich Police before moving to the BC legislature as a peace officer in 2014. In 2006, Dukeshire received the Police Exemplary Service Medal from the Governor General of Canada.
