= Phil Tollestrup =

Canadian basketball player

Personal information
- Born: October 21, 1949 (age 77) Raymond, Alberta, Canada
- Listed height: 6 ft 6 in (1.98 m)
- Listed weight: 220 lb (100 kg)

Career information
- High school: Raymond High School (Raymond, Alberta)
- College: BYU (1968–72); University of Lethbridge (1972–73)
- NBA draft: 1973: 20th round, 211th overall pick
- Drafted by: Buffalo Braves
- Position: Forward

Career history

Playing
- 1973-74: Saski Baskonia (Spain)

Coaching
- 1978-80: McMaster University
- 2004-07: Lethbridge College

Career highlights
- Third overall scorer in 1976 Summer Olympics; FIBA World Championship North / South American All-Star (1974); First Team CIAU All-Canadian (1973); University of Lethbridge Male Athlete of the Year (1973); Canada West First Team All-Star (1973)
- Stats at Basketball Reference

Phil Tollestrup (born October 12, 1949) is a Canadian former basketball player and Olympian. Among his accomplishments, he was the third overall scorer in the 1976 Summer Olympics (21.3 ppg), where Canada competed for the bronze medal; was drafted in the NBA by the Buffalo Braves in 1973; was a First Team CIAU All-Canadian (1973); was the University of Lethbridge's Male Athlete of the Year (1973); and was a First Team Canada West All-Star.

== International career ==
Tollestrup played for the Canadian men's national basketball team from 1971 to 1979. This included representing Canada in the 1976 Olympics. Tollestrup played well in these Olympics, being the tournament's third overall leading scorer with 21.3 ppg. The '76 Olympics were also noteworthy in that Canada competed for the bronze medal and finished fourth overall, one of only three times in the past 80 years in which Canada has competed for an Olympic medal in basketball.

Tollestrup also represented Canada in three Pan American Games (1971, 1975, 1979), the 1972 Pre-Olympic Tournament, the 1973 World Student Games and the 1974 FIBA World Championships. Tollestrup played well in these tournaments as well: in the 1974 World Championships, he was selected as a North / South American All-Star and was Canada's third-leading scorer with 13.3 ppg. In the 1972 Pre-Olympic tournament, he was Canada's second-leading scorer with 19.3 ppg.

== Professional ==
Tollestrup was drafted by the Buffalo Braves in the 20th round as the 211th overall pick in the 1973 NBA draft. In the 1973–74 season, Tollestrup played professionally in the Spanish first division for Saski Baskonia.

== University ==
In high school, Tollestrup led Raymond High School to win two provincial championships (1967, 1968). He was also named provincial MVP.

He played at BYU the following four years (1968–72). At BYU, he played on the conference championship team.

Tollestrup played his final year (1972–73) at the University of Lethbridge. This was the University of Lethbridge's inaugural year in basketball. In this year, he established intercollegiate scoring records when he averaged 26.4 ppg. He was named a First Team All-Canadian, a Canada West First Team All-Star and as the University of Lethbridge's Male Athlete of the Year. In this year, he also led the Pronghorns to the Canada West championship game.

== Coaching career ==
Tollestrup coached McMaster University from 1978 to 1980. He then coached at the high school level in Milk River, Stirling and Magrath in Alberta, Canada. He then coached the Lethbridge College Kodiaks from 2004 to 2007.

== Post-career Awards ==
Tollestrup has been inducted into the Canada Basketball Hall of Fame (1991), the Alberta Sports Hall of Fame (1984), the City of Lethbridge Sports Hall of Fame (2011), the University of Lethbridge Sports Hall of Fame and the City of Raymond Sports Hall of Fame,. Additionally, the 1976 Canadian men's national team of which Tollestrup was a member was inducted into the Canada Basketball Hall of Fame.

== Personal life ==
Tollestrup was born on October 12, 1949. He is a native of Raymond, Alberta, Canada.
