= Bob Burtwell =

Canadian basketball player

Personal information
- Nationality: Canadian
- Born: 4 February 1927; Vancouver, British Columbia, Canada
- Died: 22 November 2012 (aged 85); Vancouver, British Columbia, Canada

Sport
- Sport: Basketball

Bob Burtwell (4 February 1927 – 22 November 2012) was a Canadian basketball player. He competed in the men's tournament at the 1956 Summer Olympics.
