= Bob Sharpe (basketball) =

Canadian basketball player

Personal information
- Born: 17 June 1951 (age 73); Guelph, Ontario, Canada

Sport
- Sport: Basketball

Bob Sharpe (born 17 June 1951) is a Canadian basketball player. He competed in the men's tournament at the 1976 Summer Olympics.
