= Ed Lucht =

Canadian basketball player

Personal information
- Born: 6 November 1931 (age 93); Jeffrey, Alberta, Canada

Sport
- Sport: Basketball

Ed Lucht (born 6 November 1931) is a Canadian basketball player. He competed in the men's tournament at the 1956 Summer Olympics.
