= Francisco de León =

Francisco de León from the New York University Tandon School of Engineering, Brooklyn, New York. was named Fellow of the Institute of Electrical and Electronics Engineers (IEEE) in 2015 for contributions to transformer modeling for electromagnetic transient studies.

Francisco de León received the B.Sc. and the M.Sc. (Hons.) degrees in electrical engineering from the National Polytechnic Institute, Mexico City, Mexico, in 1983 and 1986, respectively, and the Ph.D. degree in electrical engineering from the University of Toronto, Toronto, Ontario, Canada, in 1992.

He has held several academic positions in Mexico and has worked for the Canadian electric industry. Currently, he is a Professor with the Department of Electrical and Computer Engineering at New York University. His research interests include the analysis of power phenomena under non-sinusoidal conditions, the transient and steady state analyses of power systems, the thermal rating of cables and transformers, and the calculation of electromagnetic fields applied to machine design and modeling. Prof. de León is the Editor-in-Chief of the IEEE Transactions on Power Delivery.
