= Michael Meeks (basketball) =

Canadian basketball player (born 1972)

Personal information
- Born: February 23, 1972 (age 54) Kingston, Jamaica
- Listed height: 6 ft 10 in (2.08 m)

Career information
- High school: Cardinal Leger Secondary School (Brampton, Ontario)
- College: Canisius (1992–1996)
- NBA draft: 1996: undrafted
- Playing career: 1996–2011
- Position: Power forward / center

Career history

Playing
- 1996–1997: Darüşşafaka
- 1997–1998: Brandt Hagen
- 1998–2000: Besançon
- 2000–2001: UNICS Kazan
- 2001–2002: Fabriano Basket
- 2002–2004: Zadar
- 2004: Central Dawgs
- 2004–2005: Viola Reggio Calabria
- 2005–2006: Telekom Baskets Bonn
- 2006–2007: ČEZ Nymburk
- 2007–2009: Euphony Bree
- 2009–2011: BG Göttingen

Coaching
- 2011–2012: BG Göttingen
- 2012–2014: S.Oliver Baskets (assistant)
Medals
Men's basketball
Representing Canada
FIBA Americas Championship
Silver medal – second place	1999 San Juan	National team
Bronze medal – third place	2001 Neuquén	National team
Summer Universiade
Silver medal – second place	1993 Buffalo	National team

Michael Meeks (born February 23, 1972) is a Canadian former professional basketball player. He is a former member of the Canadian men's national basketball team and is currently working for Canada Basketball.

== College career ==
A 6'9", 235 lb. centre-power forward, Meeks led Canisius College in his senior year in 1996 to the school's only NCAA Tournament appearance since the mid-1950s. They lost badly in the first round, however, to the Utah Utes. He finished his four-year career as the school's second all-time scorer and rebounder and was inducted in the Hall of Fame in January 2007.

== National team career ==
Meeks played for Canada in the 2000 Summer Olympics and was central to the team winning their preliminary round group leading the team in scoring. (They lost in the quarter-finals however and finished 7th.) He also competed in two world championships, 1998 and 2002.

== Personal ==
Meeks is a dual citizen, having acquired German citizenship whilst playing there. He is a native of Brampton, Ontario, having settled there as a youth after immigrating to Canada from Jamaica.

After returning to Canada, he was named manager of youth player development at Canada Basketball in 2015.
