= Doug Brinham =

Canadian basketball player (1934–2020)

Personal information
- Nationality: Canadian
- Born: 25 February 1934 Vancouver, British Columbia, Canada
- Died: 28 September 2020 (aged 86) White Rock, British Columbia, Canada

Sport
- Sport: Basketball

Doug Brinham (25 February 1934 – 28 September 2020) was a Canadian basketball player. He competed in the men's tournament at the 1956 Summer Olympics.
