= Peter Mullins =

Australian decathlete

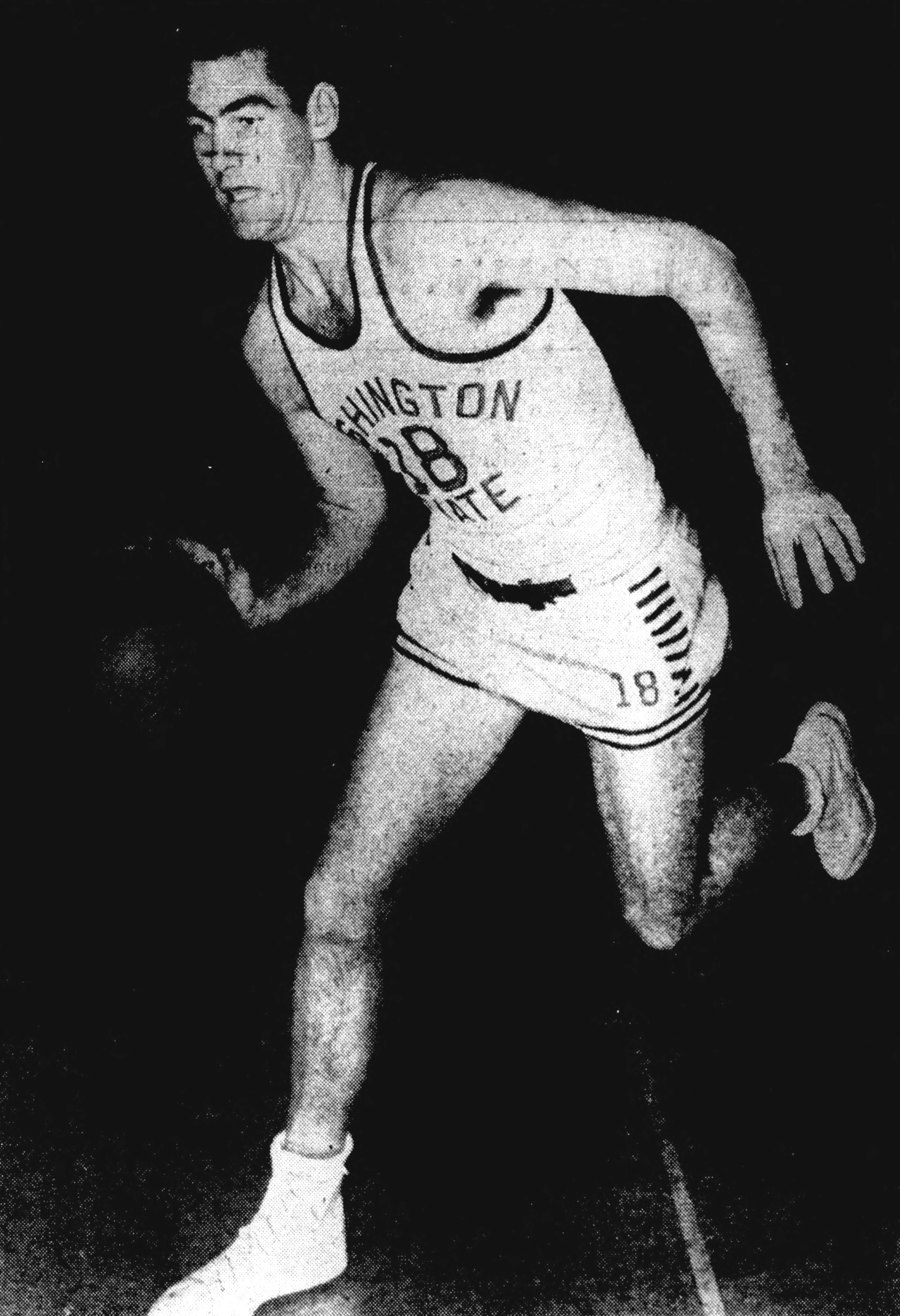
- Mullins, circa 1950

Personal information
- Nationality: Australian
- Born: 9 July 1926 Bondi, New South Wales, Australia
- Died: 13 April 2012 (aged 85) Sydney, Australia

Sport
- Event: Decathlon

Peter Mullins (9 July 1926 – 13 April 2012) was an Australian decathlete and basketball player. He competed in the decathlon at the 1948 Summer Olympics. As a basketball player, he played at the 1959 FIBA World Championship on the Canadian team. Mullins also coached the UBC Thunderbirds for twenty years, recording more than 330 wins.

== Early life ==
Mullins was born in Bondi, Australia in 1926. Mullins played hockey, rugby, Australian rules football, table tennis and was swimmer. At the age of fifteen, Mullins became a pole vaulter, before moving onto the decathlon. He gained his diploma in physical education from the Sydney Teachers' College.

== Career ==
In 1946, he broke the Australian record for the decathlon, and was selected to represent Australia in the event at the 1948 Summer Olympics in London, England. He finished in sixth place at the Olympics, setting another Australian record in the process. At the 1949 Australian championships, Mullins won a gold and two bronze, before his focus moved to basketball.

After moving to the United States, Mullins was offered a scholarship at Washington State University. After graduating, he moved to Canada and became a member of staff at the University of British Columbia in 1955. Mullins then went to represent the Canadian basketball team at the 1959 FIBA World Championship. He continued playing throughout the 1960s and 1970s, before retiring in 1982. Mullins also coached the Canadian basketball team at the 1970 Summer Universiade in Turin, Italy. His team at the University of British Columbia also won the Western Canadian University Championships seven times from 1963 to 1975.

== Death ==
Mullins returned to Australia, where he died in 2012, aged 85. He was inducted into the British Columbia Basketball Hall of Fame in 2004, and the Dr. Peter Mullins Trophy is award to the best rookie player in universities in Canada.
