= Alex Devlin =

Canadian basketball player

Personal information
- Born: December 12, 1949 (age 76) Edmonton, Alberta
- Listed height: 6 ft 2 1/2 in (189 cm)
- Listed weight: 176 lb (12 st 8 lb; 80 kg)

Career information
- College: Simon Fraser

Alexander Devlin (born December 12, 1949) is a Canadian former basketball player. He played for Canada at the 1976 Summer Olympics. He was born in Edmonton, Alberta. As of 2010 he teaches physical education at Port Moody Secondary School in British Columbia.
