= Danny Meagher (basketball) =

Canadian basketball player and Olympian

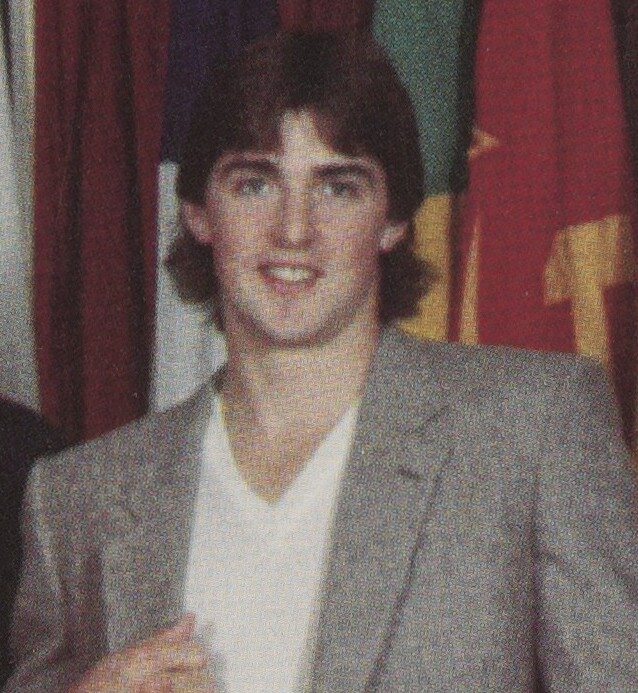
- Meagher in 1983

Personal information
- Born: 25 October 1962 (age 64) Kingston, Ontario, Canada
- Listed height: 6 ft 7 in (2.01 m)
- Listed weight: 215 lb (98 kg)

Career information
- High school: Denis Morris (St. Catharines, Ontario)
- College: Duke (1981–1985)
- NBA draft: 1985: 6th round, 126th overall pick
- Drafted by: Chicago Bulls
- Position: Forward
- Number: 45, 15, 11
- Stats at Basketball Reference

Daniel Meagher (born 25 October 1962) is a Canadian basketball player and Olympian. Among his accomplishments, he played for Duke from 1981-85; represented Canada in the 1984 Olympics; was a FISU gold medalist; and was drafted by the Chicago Bulls in the 1985 NBA Draft.

== University ==
Meagher played for Duke under Coach Mike Krzyzewski for four seasons from 1981-85. Meagher has been described as being one of the top 100 Duke players to play for Coach Krzyzewski.

Meagher averaged 7.9 and 8 points per game in his junior and senior seasons, respectively. In 1984 ACC tournament, he and Duke narrowly defeated the University of North Carolina ("UNC") to advance to the ACC championship game where they were defeated by Maryland.

=== University Statistics ===
Year	Team	GP	FG	FG%	FT	FT%	Rbds	RPG	Pts	PPG
1981-82	Duke	26	40-103	38.8	29-48	60.4	102	3.9	109	4.2
1982-83	Duke	28	43-100	43.0	51-82	62.2	96	3.4	137	4.9
1983-84	Duke	34	94-206	45.6	81-126	64.3	148	4.4	269	7.9
1984-85	Duke	30	98-187	52.4	45-67	67.2	130	4.3	241	8.0
Career	Duke	118	275-596	46.1	206-323	63.8	476	4.0	756	6.4

== International career ==
Meagher represented Canada in multiple international tournaments, including the 1984 Olympics, the 1983 World Student Games and the 1986 and 1990 World Championships.

=== 1984 Olympics ===
Meagher played well in the 1984 Olympics, particularly in the semi-final match against the United States where Meagher was Canada's second-leading scorer with 11 points.

Canada finished 4th overall in the 1984 Olympics, narrowly missing a medal. This 1984 bronze-medal game constituted the only time in the past 80+ years where Canada has had a legitimate chance of winning an Olympic medal in basketball. This bronze medal game was highly competitive, being tied 18 times with 12 lead changes, with Canada being within one point with less than a minute of play remaining.

=== 1983 World Student Games ===
Meagher represented Canada in the 1983 FISU World University Games, where Canada won the gold medal. In the semifinal match of this tournament, Canada defeated a talented US team led by future NBA hall of famers Charles Barkley and Karl Malone. This 1983 gold medal win constituted one of the finest moments in Canadian basketball history, being the only time in which Canada has won the gold medal in an international basketball tournament.

=== FIBA World Championships ===
Meagher also represented Canada in the 1986 and 1990 World Championships.

In 1986, Meagher again performed well against the United States, being Canada's leading scorer with 19 points. Meagher was also Canada's second-leading scorer against Malaysia with 14 points. Meagher finished this 1986 tournament as Canada's sixth overall scorer with 8.9 points per game.

In 1990, in Canada's game against the Soviet Union, Meagher was Canada's leading scorer with 15 points. In Canada's game against Korea, Meagher had the second-highest points among Canadians with 14 points. Meagher finished the tournament as Canada's seventh-highest overall scorer.

== Professional ==
Meagher was drafted by the Chicago Bulls in the 6th round of the 1985 NBA Draft as the 126th overall pick. Meagher also played 8 seasons professionally overseas.
