= Dwight Walton =

Canadian basketball player

Dwight Walton (born March 25, 1965, in Montreal, Quebec) is a former basketball player from Montreal, Quebec, Canada. He began his basketball journey at Wagar High School in 1979 under the tutelage of Don McEwen and Jim Aiken and he received his high school diploma in 1982. Walton then attended Dawson College, a CEGEP in Montreal, which is equivalent to the prep school system, where he was named an All Canadian in 1986. He then attended Siena College for the 1986–87 season and was named the North Atlantic Conference Rookie of the Year. He then transferred to the Florida Institute of Technology from 1987 to 1991, received his bachelor's degree in business/management and was a three-time All American. Walton is also in the Florida Tech Sports Hall of Fame, the Sunshine State Conference Hall of Fame and is on the Sunshine State Conference 25th Anniversary Team.

After receiving an invitation to try out for the Canadian national basketball team from coach Jack Donahue in 1986, Walton made the team and remained a member until 1995.He played in every major international competition including the 1988 Olympic Games in Seoul. He called that the most gratifying experience/accomplishment of his basketball career. "To be known as one of Canada's Best Players, is an accomplishment that I’ll always cherish."

Walton went on to play professional basketball in two countries. He played in Israel for four seasons(1994–98 and 2000) and in Switzerland from 1998 to 2004. He was drafted to play in the now defunct CBA by Omaha in 1991 and played briefly for Oklahoma City in 1992. He also played professionally in his hometown of Montreal for several franchises.

After retiring from professional basketball in 2004, Walton worked for the English Montreal School Board as a Student Supervisor from November 15, 2004 until June 30, 2024. He also coached basketball while working for the EMSB at John F. Kennedy High School and Lester B. Pearson High School.

Walton is currently an Assistant Coach for the Concordia Stingers men's basketball program in Montreal, a position he has held since 2017, a basketball analyst for many media outlets in Canada, from which he got his start at the Team 990, which is now TSN 690 in Montreal, the color commentator for the Montreal Alliance of the Canadian Elite Basketball League (CEBL) and is the General Manager for the Los Angeles Ignite of The Basketball League. Walton also finds time to be a part-time referee in various recreational leagues and prep school leagues in Montreal and the Province of Quebec.

Walton was born and raised in Montreal and is of Jamaican descent. He was named a Jamaican Hero by the Jamaican Association of Montreal on October 20, 2018. He was nominated by then President, Michael Smith. Smith was a teammate of Walton's at Florida Tech. Walton was also selected by Canada Basketball and Rowan Barrett Sr., a teammate on the national team, to be in the "Dreamer's Circle" in 2023, for his contributions to his community and to his country, to the game of basketball.

== See also ==
- List of Montreal athletes
- list of famous Montrealers
