= Ruby Richman =

Canadian basketball player (1934–2021)

Personal information
- Born: 22 September 1934; Willowdale, Ontario, Canada
- Died: 2 November 2021 (aged 87); Toronto, Ontario, Canada

Sport
- Sport: Basketball

Reuben Ruby Richman (22 September 1934 – 2 November 2021) was a Canadian basketball player. He was the coach and a player in the men's tournament at the 1964 Summer Olympics.
