= John McKibbon =

Canadian basketball player

Personal information
- Born: 14 September 1939; Sudbury, Ontario, Canada
- Died: 10 July 2024 (aged 84)

Sport
- Sport: Basketball

John McKibbon (14 September 1939 – 10 July 2024) was a Canadian basketball player. He competed in the men's tournament at the 1964 Summer Olympics.
