= Richard Elias Anderson =

Canadian basketball player

Personal information
- Born: November 30, 1977 (age 48) Ottawa, Ontario
- Listed height: 6 ft 6 in (1.98 m)
- Listed weight: 246 lb (112 kg)

Career information
- College: Simon Fraser (1998–2001)
- Playing career: 2001–2012
- Position: Center
- Coaching career: 2012–present

Career history

Playing
- 2001–2002: Mattersburg 49ers
- 2002–2004: Angers BC 49
- 2004: BC Union Sportive Hiefenech
- 2004: BC Kalev Tallinn
- 2004–2005: Belenenses Basquetebol
- 2005–2008: WBC Wels
- 2008–2009: Valga/CKE Inkasso
- 2009: BC Titans
- 2009–2011: BC Rakvere Tarvas
- 2011–2012: Levharti Chomutov
- 2012: Halifax Rainmen

Coaching
- 2012–present: Carleton (assistant)

Career highlights
- Austrian Basketball Cup (2002); Estonian League Center of the Year (2004)
Medals
Men's basketball
Representing Canada
FIBA Americas Championship
Silver medal – second place	Puerto Rico 1999	Canada

Richard Elias Anderson (born November 30, 1977) is a Canadian former professional basketball player who last played for the Halifax Rainmen at the center position. He is currently an assistant coach at Carleton University.

== Achievements with club ==
Mattersburg 49ers

- Austrian Basketball Cup: 2002

BC Rakvere Tarvas

- Estonian Championship:
  - Runner-up: 2010
