= Peter Guarasci =

Canadian basketball player (born 1974)

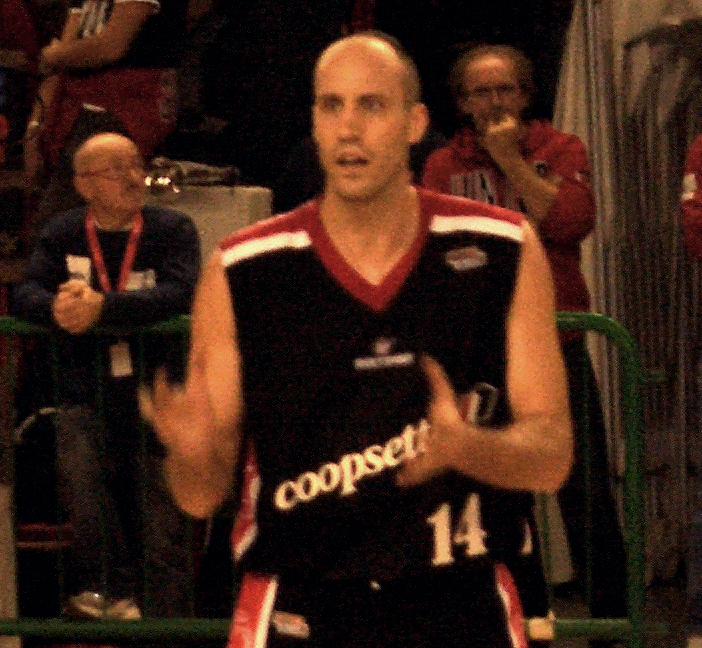

Personal information
- Born: 25 February 1974 (age 52) Niagara Falls, Ontario, Canada
- Listed height: 6 ft 9 in (2.06 m)
- Listed weight: 229 lb (104 kg)

Career information
- College: Fairfield (1992–1994); Simon Fraser (1994–1996)
- NBA draft: 1996: undrafted
- Playing career: 1996–2008
- Position: Power forward

Career history

Playing
- 1996–1999: Scavolini Pesaro
- 1999–2000: Skyliners Frankfurt
- 2000–2001: Roseto Basket
- 2001–2002: Caja San Fernando
- 2002–2004: Crabs Rimini
- 2004–2005: Bipop Carire Reggio Emilia
- 2005–2008: Crabs Rimini

Coaching
- 2019: Fraser Valley Bandits
Medals
Men's basketball
Representing Canada
Universiade
Bronze medal – third place	1995 Fukuoka	National team
FIBA Americas Championship
Silver medal – second place	1999 San Juan	National team
Bronze medal – third place	2001 Neuquén	National team

Peter Guarasci (born 25 February 1974) is a Canadian former professional basketball player. Having played in Serie A and the Basketball Bundesliga, he currently plays in the Lega2 in Italy and is a former prominent member of the Canadian national men's basketball team.

Guarasci played collegiately for Fairfield University for two seasons, 1992–93 and 1993–94. He was named to the Metro Atlantic Athletic Conference all-rookie team as a freshman. Guarasci then transferred to Simon Fraser University where he played in 1995 and 1996 and was named 1996 NAIA conference player of the year. He graduated with a degree in business.

The 6'9, 230 lbs. Guarasci joined Italian club Scavolini Pesaro in 1996 and played three seasons for the club. He played 1999-2000 for the German club Frankfurt Skyliners, averaging 10.5 points per game. He returned to Serie A the next season joining Roseto Basket, where he stayed for three seasons. In 2003, he joined his current club Basket Rimini Crabs.

Guarasci was a member of the Canadian national team from 1996 through 2003, participating in the 1998 FIBA World Championship and 2000 Summer Olympics. The Canadians were impressive early on at these Olympics, winning their group in the preliminary round, before being defeated by France in the quarter-finals.

Of Italian descent, Guarasci has acquired dual Canadian-Italian citizenship.

== Sources ==
- www.canoe.ca
- Wikipedia in Italian
