= Jack Donohue (basketball) =

American basketball player-coach

Personal information
- Born: June 4, 1931 New York City, New York, U.S.
- Died: April 16, 2003 (aged 71) Ottawa, Ontario, Canada
- Coaching career: 1950–1988

Career history

Coaching
- 1950–1952: Fordham (assistant)
- 1955–1959: St. Nicholas of Tolentine
- 1959–1965: Power Memorial
- 1965–1972: Holy Cross
- 1972–1988: Canada
- FIBA Hall of Fame
Medals
Head Coach for Canada Men's Basketball
FIBA AmeriCup
Silver medal – second place	1980 San Juan
Bronze medal – third place	1984 São Paulo
Bronze medal – third place	1988 Montevideo
Summer Universiade
Gold medal – first place	1983 Edmonton
Bronze medal – third place	1985 Kobe

John Patrick Donohue, M.S.M. posthumous (June 4, 1931 – April 16, 2003) was an American-Canadian basketball coach. Donohue was the head coach of the senior Canadian men's national basketball team for 16 years, and he led them to several international successes. He was inducted into the FIBA Hall of Fame, in 2013.

== Coaching career ==
Donohue served as a basketball coach for St. Nicholas of Tolentine High School. He then served as the head coach of Power Memorial Academy, from 1959 to 1965. At Power Memorial, Donohue had a career win–loss record of 163–30, including winning 71 straight games with the star center of his team, Lew Alcindor (later known as Kareem Abdul-Jabbar). Donohue's 1963–64 Power Memorial team was named, "The High School Team of The Century".

Donohue went on to work as the head coach of the College of the Holy Cross, from 1965 to 1972. With Holy Cross, he compiled a record of 106–66.

Donohue was also the head basketball coach of the senior men's Canadian national basketball team, from 1972 to 1988. Donohue coached Canada at three Summer Olympic Games (in 1976, 1984, and 1988), highlighted by two fourth-place finishes in 1976 and 1984. He also coached Canada at the 1974 FIBA World Championship, the 1978 FIBA World Championship, the 1982 FIBA World Championship, and the 1986 FIBA World Championship. In an incident aimed at motivating gameplay, Donahue made a racially inappropriate remark directed at Kareem Abdul-Jabbar by calling him a nigger, resulting in a strained relationship between the two.

With Canada, Donohue won the silver medal at the 1980 Tournament of the Americas. He also won bronze medals at the 1984 Tournament of the Americas and the 1988 Tournament of the Americas. He also led the Canadian national university team to the gold medal at the 1983 Summer Universiade, and the bronze medal at the 1985 Summer Universiade.

== Awards and accomplishments ==
- Inducted into the Canadian Olympic Hall of Fame: 1991
- Inducted into the Canadian Basketball Hall of Fame: 1992
- Inducted into the Ontario Basketball Hall of Fame: 2000
- Inducted into the New York State Basketball Hall of Fame: 2002
- Inducted into the Canadian Disability Hall of Fame: 2003
- Meritorious Service Decoration (Canada): 2004
- Inducted into Canada's Sports Hall of Fame: 2004
- Inducted into the FIBA Hall of Fame: 2013

== Personal life ==
Donohue was married to Mary–Jane Donohue, who was lovingly referred to as his "bride", in 1963. Donohue died from pancreatic cancer, in Ottawa, Ontario, on 16 April 2003. He was a 1952 graduate of Fordham University with a degree in economics.

== See also ==
=== Archives ===
There is a John Jack Donohue fonds at Library and Archives Canada. The archival reference number is R15842.

Preceded by Paul Mullins	Canada men's national basketball team head coach 1972–1988	Succeeded by Ken Shields
