= Norman Clarke (basketball) =

Canadian basketball player

Personal information
- Born: 27 June 1960 (age 64); Toronto, Ontario, Canada

Sport
- Sport: Basketball

Norman Clarke (born 27 June 1960) is a Canadian basketball player. He competed in the men's tournament at the 1988 Summer Olympics.
