= Prosper Karangwa =

Burundian basketball player

Philadelphia 76ers
- Title: Vice President of Player Personnel
- League: NBA

Personal information
- Born: 17 May 1978 (age 48) Bujumbura, Republic of Burundi
- Listed height: 6 ft 7 in (2.01 m)

Career information
- College: Siena (1999–2003)
- NBA draft: 2003: undrafted
- Playing career: 2003–2010
- Position: Small forward

Career history
- 2003: Adirondack Wildcats
- 2003–2004: Al-Ittihad
- 2004–2005: BS Energy Braunschweig
- 2005–2006: Kapfenberg Bulls
- 2006–2007: JA Vichy
- 2007: Besançon
- 2007–2008: JA Vichy
- 2008–2010: Paris Levallois

Career highlights
- 2× LNB Pro B champion (2007, 2009)

Prosper Karangwa (born 17 May 1978) is a Canadian-Rwandan former professional basketball player and front office executive for the Vice President of Player Personal Philadelphia 76ers of the National Basketball Association (NBA) with the duties of General Manager of Delaware Blue Coats of the NBA G League. Prior to his hire with Philadelphia, Karangwa worked with the Orlando Magic as Vice president of scouting. Before he joined the front office, Karangwa was a basketball player playing for teams like BS Energy Braunschweig and Paris-Levallois. He retired in 2010.

After retiring, he joined the Orlando Magic as Vice President of College Scouting and before being promoted to Vice President of Scouting. In October 2020, he was hired by Elton Brand as Vice President of Player Personnel for the 76ers.

== Basketball career ==
=== High school ===
Karangwa, son of a nurse and a chemist, first grew up in Burundi and moved to Montreal with his family when he was nine years of age. He attended École secondaire Antoine-de-Saint-Exupéry in Montreal and then moved to Dawson College. At 15, his interest in basketball became more serious. He started traveling to the U.S. for the AAU basketball competitions. His travels included weekly 10-plus hour Greyhound bus rides to face elite competition. One of the people he played with was his future boss Elton Brand. He gained interest from college scouts after.

=== College ===
He played National Collegiate Athletic Association (NCAA) basketball at Siena College for four years (1999–2003).

=== Professional ===
In 2003, Karangwa played professional basketball for the Adirondack Wildcats in the United States Basketball League. He subsequently played in Syria, Germany, Austria and France, before retiring in 2010.

=== National team ===
Representing the Canadian men's basketball national team, Karangwa participated in the 2001 Goodwill Games. During the 2002 FIBA World Championship he averaged 9 points per contest.

== Executive career ==
=== Scouting business ===
He began attending games with Rob Jackson, a San Antonio Spurs scout and got him to take up scouting. He started his own scouting service to help European teams scout in the United States.

=== Orlando Magic ===
In 2012, he was hired as a scout by the Orlando Magic. In 2016, he was promoted to Director of Scouting.

=== Philadelphia 76ers ===
In October 2020, Karangwa was hired as Vice President of Player Personnel by Elton Brand for the Philadelphia 76ers.

=== Delaware Blue Coats ===
In October 2021, Philadelphia 76ers named Karangwa General Manager of the Delaware Blue Coats. In his role as GM, Karangwa lead the Blue Coats to a G-League championship in 2023.
