= Derek Sankey =

Former Canadian Basketball Player

Personal information
- Born: December 17, 1948 (age 77) Vancouver, British Columbia, Canada
- Listed height: 6 ft 3 in (1.91 m)
- Listed weight: 185 lb (84 kg)

Career information
- High school: Lord Byng Secondary School (Vancouver, British Columbia)
- College: University of British Columbia ("UBC") (1967–1971)
- Position: Forward
- Number: 8

Career highlights
- Canada Basketball Hall of Fame (1994); Basketball BC Hall of Fame (2007); UBC Sports Hall of Fame (2025); Canadian university ("CIAU") national champion (1970); CIAU Tournament All-star (1970); CIAU All-Canadian hounorable mention (1970); WCIAA Conference First-team All-star (1971)

Derek Sankey (born December 17, 1948) is a former Canadian basketball player. He represented Canada in the 1976 Olympic games and many other international tournaments; was a Canadian university ("CIAU") champion; and has been inducted into many prestigious halls of fame as both a player and part of teams.

== International career ==
Sankey represented Canada on their national team from 1970-76. This included the 1976 Olympic games, where Canada competed for the bronze medal and finished fourth overall. This was one of the two times in the past 90 years in which Canada competed for an Olympic medal in basketball, the other being the 1984 Olympics. A notable performance from Sankey in these Olympic games occurred against the Soviet Union, where Sankey led all Canadians with 18 points. Sankey had the 7th highest points per minute among Canadians in these Olympics. Sankey is the only University of British Columbia ("UBC") athlete to play for the Canadian men's Olympic basketball team.

Sankey performed well in other national team international tournaments. Sankey represented Canada in the 1972 Pre-Olympic tournament, where Sankey was the fourth-leading scorer in the tournament and led all Canadians with 22 ppg. Canada finished 6th overall in this tournament. Sankey also represented Canada in the 1970 FIBA World Championship, where he was Canada's second leading scorer overall with 13.1 ppg. Sankey also represented Canada in the 1970 World Student Games and the 1975 Pan American Games.

== University career ==
Before university, Sankey played at the high school level at Lord Byng Secondary School.

Sankey played for the UBC Thunderbirds from 1967-71. In the 1969-70 season, UBC won the Canadian university CIAU national championship, the first national championship for UBC. This season, UBC went undefeated against CIAU competition (23-0). UBC decisively won the national championship game against McMaster University by 21 points (96-75). In this season, Sankey was selected as a CIAU tournament all-star and as a CIAU All-Canadian honourable mention. In the 1970-71 season, Sankey was selected as a WCIAA conference first-team all-star.

== Post-career recognition ==
Sankey has been inducted into the Canada Basketball Hall of Fame (1994), the Basketball BC Hall of Fame (2007) and the UBC Sports Hall of Fame. Teams on which he played have also been inducted into prestigious halls of fame: the 1976 Canadian Olympic team was inducted into the Canada Basketball Hall of Fame (2007) and the 1969-70 UBC Thunderbirds team was inducted into the UBC Sports Hall of Fame (1993).

== Personal life ==
Sankey was born on December 17, 1948 in Vancouver, British Columbia.
