= Sherman Hamilton =

Canadian basketball player

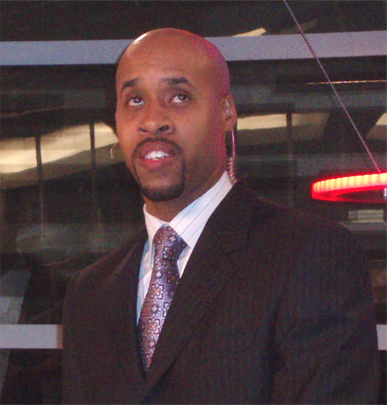
- Hamilton in 2007

Personal information
- Born: April 23, 1972 (age 54) Toronto, Ontario, Canada
- Listed height: 6 ft 1 in (1.85 m)
- Listed weight: 190 lb (86 kg)

Career information
- College: VCU (1994–1997)
- Position: Point guard

Career highlights
- Second-team All-CAA (1996)

Sherman Hamilton (born April 23, 1972) is a Canadian former professional basketball player. Hamilton was a longtime member of the Canadian men's national basketball team. He is currently a basketball analyst for Sportsnet and NBA TV Canada.

== Career ==
Raised in Malton, a neighbourhood in Mississauga, Ontario, the 6 ft 1 in, 190 lb point guard played college basketball at Virginia Commonwealth University, from 1994 to 1997, as a member of the VCU Rams. He amassed 881 points (9.8 per game) in his three years with the Rams, leaving VCU ranked fifth all-time in career assists. He handed out 4.6 assists a game playing for the Rams. Hamilton was a 1995-96 Colonial Athletic Association Second Team selection.

Hamilton played two games for Finnish Korisliiga side Tapiolan Honka in 1997–98, averaging 9 points per contest. In 1998–99, he appeared in 41 Korislliga games for Honka, posting averages of 16.4 points a game, en route to a runner-up finish in the Finnish top flight. With Honka, he also competed in the FIBA Korać Cup. At the beginning of the 1999-2000 campaign, Hamilton played at Belgrano de San Nicolás in Argentina, but was released in November 1999. In February 2001, he was signed by SSV Ratiopharm Ulm of the German Basketball Bundesliga. Hamilton saw action in 16 Bundesliga contests with per game averages of 15.9 points, 5.2 rebounds and 4.7 assists in the 2000-01 campaign. He had a season-high 29 points for Ulm, knocking down 6-of-13 three pointers. After playing in Switzerland, Hamilton joined BC Žalgiris in December 2001. In 28 appearances in the Lithuanian league, he averaged 8 points per contest. He also made five EuroLeague appearances for Žalgiris, averaging 3.2 points per match.

He played for Canada at the 2000 Summer Olympics, as well as the 1998 and 2002 FIBA World Championships. Hamilton was instrumental in helping Team Canada to qualify for the 2000 Olympics, when he converted seven free throws in the last three minutes in a qualifier against Puerto Rico. He won a total of 116 caps for the Canadian national team between 1995 and 2002. In 2005, Hamilton served as assistant coach at Canada's Cadet Men's National Team during the USA Basketball International Invitational tournament in San Diego, US, as well as an assistant coach at Canada's Development Men's National Team during the World University Games in Izmir, Turkey. In 2006, he was named assistant coach of Canada's Men's National Team.

In recent years, Hamilton has been an analyst. Since the 2008–09 season, he has provided colour commentary for Toronto Raptors games on NBA TV Canada.
