= Gerald Kazanowski =

Canadian basketball player (born 1960)

Personal information
- Born: October 12, 1960 (age 66) Nanaimo, British Columbia, Canada
- Listed height: 6 ft 9 in (2.06 m)
- Listed weight: 220 lb (100 kg)

Career information
- High school: Nanaimo District Secondary School (Nanaimo, British Columbia)
- College: University of Victoria (1979–1983)
- NBA draft: 1983: 7th round, 146th overall pick
- Drafted by: Utah Jazz
- Position: Power forward
- Number: 24, 8, 15

Career highlights
- 2× CIAU First Team All-Canadian (1982, 1983); 2× CIAU Tournament All-Star (1981- 1983); 4x CIAU national champion (1980-1983); 2× Premier's Athletic Award; 4× CWUAA All-Star (1979–1982)
- Stats at Basketball Reference

Gerald Francis Kazanowski (born October 12, 1960) is a two-time Olympian and former professional basketball player.

Kazanowski played for the Canada men's national basketball team from 1979 - 1990, representing Canada in the 1984 and 1988 Olympics, three times in the World Student Games (1981, 1983, 1985) and three times in the FIBA World Championships (1982, 1986, 1990).

In 1983, Kazanowski was drafted in the seventh round by the Utah Jazz. He later played professionally from 1984 to 1992 in Spain, Sweden, Finland, Switzerland, Luxembourg, Argentina and Mexico.

Kazanowski played for the University of Victoria from 1979 to 1983 where he won four consecutive CIAU national championships. He was a two-time First Team CIAU All-Canadian (1982, 1983), two-time recipient of the Premier's Athletic Award, two-time CIAU Tournament All-star (1981, 1983) and four-time Canada West All-Star.

== International career ==
Kazanowski was a member of Canada's national basketball team from 1979 to 1990. He began his tenure on the Canadian national team in 1979 while playing in the FIBA Junior World Championship.

He represented Canada in the 1984 and 1988 Olympics. Kazanowski obtained the second-highest points-per-game average among Canada's roster in 1984.

These 1984 Olympics were also notable given that Canada finished 4th overall, narrowly missing a medal. Also, this 1984 bronze-medal game constituted the only time in the past 80+ years where Canada has had a legitimate chance of winning an Olympic medal in basketball. This bronze medal game was highly competitive, being tied 18 times with 12 lead changes, with Canada being within one point with less than a minute of play remaining. Kazanowski played well in this crucial game, scoring 8 points, grabbing 6 rebounds and playing his usual formidable defense. Canada also performed well in the 1988 Olympics, where they finished 6th overall.

Kazanowski also represented Canada in three World Student Games tournaments (1981, 1983 and 1985). Canada won the gold medal in the 1983 games, defeating the US in the semi-final match (with the US being led by future NBA legends Charles Barkley and Karl Malone). This constituted one of the finest moments in Canadian basketball history, being the only time in which Canada has won the gold medal in an international basketball tournament. In the 1985 World Student Games, Canada won the bronze medal and in 1981, Canada placed 5th.

Kazanowski also represented Canada in 3 FIBA World Championships (1982, 1986, 1990) and competed against the US's "Dream Team" in the 1992 FIBA Tournament of the Americas.

== Professional career ==
In 1983, Kazanowski was drafted in the seventh round in the NBA Draft by the Utah Jazz. From 1984 to 1992 he played professionally for international teams, including in Spain (for Joventut and Baloncesto León), in Sweden, Finland, Switzerland, Luxembourg, Argentina and Mexico.

== University ==
Kazanowski played for the University of Victoria from 1979 to 1983. He was a four-time national champion at UVic. In his first year at UVic, he and his teammates placed second in the national tournament. In the 1979–80 season, Kazanowski and his teammates had a 20–0 regular season record, the first Canada West basketball team to achieve a perfect regular season record.

During his time at UVic, Kazanowski was a two-time First Team CIAU All-Canadian (1981–1983), two-time recipient of the Premier's Athletic Award, two-time CIAU Tournament All-Star (1981, 1983) and four-time Canada West All-Star.

== Post-career ==
Kazanowski was inducted in the Canada Basketball Hall of Fame (2005), the Basketball BC Sports Hall of Fame (2006), the University of Victoria Sports Hall of Fame (2006), the Greater Victoria Sports Hall of Fame (2016), the Nanaimo Sports Hall of Fame (2008) and the Nanaimo District Secondary School Hall of Fame. In 2011, the University of Victoria retired his number 24; Kazanowski is only one of three athletes to have his jersey retired by the university.

Also, the 1979-80 University of Victoria men's basketball team was inducted into the BC Sports Hall of Fame (2020); the 1979-86 UVic teams were inducted into the Canada West Hall of Fame; and the 1982-83 UVic team was inducted into the UVic Sports Hall of Fame, with Kazanowski being recognized as a team member in all of these inductions.

== Personal life ==
Kazanowski was born on October 12, 1960 to polish immigrants. He began playing basketball in his hometown of Nanaimo, B.C., in grade six.

He graduated from UVic with a degree in economics and is now a certified financial advisor.

Kazanowski met his wife of 20+ years, Claudia, while he was playing professionally in Mexico. He retired from professional basketball in 1992 and by 1993, he was immersed in the financial advisory industry. His office is located in Sidney and he lives in North Saanich with his wife and their two daughters, Sarah and Grace.

He now gives back to the community as much as he can; he often volunteers at local schools to provide speaking addresses on how sports can be a positive influence, while also providing advice to older students on how to start thinking about their finances early. Additionally, Kazanowski and his family are involved with the ROCK home makeover project for disadvantaged homeowners on the Saanich Peninsula.
