= John Hatch (basketball, born 1962) =

Canadian Basketball Player

Personal information
- Born: February 23, 1962 (age 64) Calgary, Alberta, Canada
- Listed height: 6 ft 6 in (1.98 m)

Career information
- High school: Bishop Carroll High School (Calgary, Alberta)
- College: St. Francis Xavier University (1981–1984)
- Position: Small forward
- Number: 30, 10, 11

Career highlights
- 2x Olympian (1984, 1988); 3x Canadian University ("CIAU") First-team All-Canadian (1982, 1983, 1984); 3x Atlantic University Conference ("AUS") MVP (1982, 1983, 1984); 3x AUS First-team All-star (1982, 1983, 1984); Graduated from St. Francis Xavier with most career points (2,986) and second-most career rebounds (1,478); Played professionally in Switzerland and Belgium for 7 seasons; Nova Scotia Sport Hall of Fame Inductee (2013); St. Francis Xavier University Athletic Hall of Fame Inductee (1996)

John Hatch (born February 23, 1962) is a former Canadian basketball player. He is a two-time Olympian; is one of the only three-time First-team All-Canadians in Canadian university ("CIAU") basketball history; was one of the most successful players in St. Francis Xavier University's ("St. FX") history; played professionally in Switzerland and Belgium for 7 seasons; and has been inducted into several halls of fame.

== International career ==
Hatch represented Canada in multiple international tournaments, including the 1984 Olympics, the 1988 Olympics, the 1983 World Student Games, the 1986 FIBA World Championship, 1987 Pan American Games, the 1984 American Olympic Qualifying tournament and the 1988 American Olympic Qualifying tournament.

=== 1988 Olympics ===
Hatch performed well in the 1988 Olympics. He was Canada's third overall scorer (11.5 ppg) and Canada's leading rebounder (6.0 rbg). He had the 27th highest points per game among all Olympians in the tournament.

Hatch had notable performances against Brazil, where he was Canada's second-leading scorer with 25 points and Canada's leading rebounder with 10 rebounds; against Spain, where he was Canada's second-leading scorer with 19 points; against China, where he was Canada's leading rebounder with 8 rebounds and Canada's third-leading scorer with 14 points; and against Egypt, where he was Canada's second-leading scorer with 15 points..

=== 1984 Olympics ===
Hatch also represented Canada in the 1984 Olympics. Canada performed well in the tournament, finishing fourth overall after narrowly losing the bronze medal game. This 1984 bronze-medal game constituted the only time in the past 80+ years where Canada had a legitimate chance of winning an Olympic medal in basketball. This bronze medal game was highly competitive, being tied 18 times with 12 lead changes, with Canada being within one point with less than a minute of play remaining.

=== 1983 World Student Games ===
Hatch represented Canada in the 1983 World Student Games, where Canada won the gold medal. In the semifinal match of this tournament, Canada defeated a talented US team led by future NBA hall of famers Charles Barkley and Karl Malone. This 1983 gold medal win constituted one of the finest moments in Canadian basketball history, being the only time in which Canada has won the gold medal in an international basketball tournament.

=== 1986 FIBA World Championship ===
Hatch represented Canada in the 1986 FIBA World Championship. Hatch was Canada's fourth overall scorer in the tournament (11.6 ppg). He had notable performances against Spain, where he led all scorers with 29 points; against Malaysia, where he led all scorers with 20 points; against Israel, where he was Canada's second-leading scorer with 15 points; against Italy, where he was Canada's third-leading scorer with 14 points; and against New Zealand, where he was Canada's third-leading scorer with 11 points.

== University career ==
Hatch played at the university level for St. Francis Xavier University for four seasons (1980-1984). He graduated as the all-team leading scorer in St. FX history with 2,986 points; as the second-leading rebounder in St. FX history with 1,478; and with the St. FX records for most rebounds in a season and a game. This is notable because he did so in only four seasons, while Canadian university has five years of eligibility.

Hatch was a three-time First-team CIAU All-Canadian (1982, 1983, 1984). Only 13 other athletes have been three-time First-team All-Canadians in CIAU basketball history. He is the only St. FX basketball player to be a three-time All-Canadian.

Hatch also received recognition at the conference level and at tournaments. He was named the AUS Conference MVP three-times and was a three-time first-team AUS all-star. He was named the MVP of the St. FX Invitational Tournament twice (1983, 1984). In 1981, he and his teammates were the AUS Conference champions.

=== Career regular season statistics ===
| Year | Team | GP | FG | FG% | FT | FT% | Rbds | RPG | Pts | PPG |
|---|---|---|---|---|---|---|---|---|---|---|
| 1980-81 | St. FX | 18 | 89-162 | 54.9 | 46-55 | 83.6 | 120 | 6.7 | 224 | 12.4 |
| 1981-82 | St. FX | 18 | 168-295 | 56.9 | 88-111 | 79.3 | 230 | 12.8 | 424 | 23.6 |
| 1982-83 | St. FX | 18 | 148-297 | 49.8 | 116-154 | 75.3 | 209 | 11.6 | 412 | 22.9 |
| 1983-84 | St. FX | 18 | 146-294 | 49.7 | 118-152 | 77.6 | 176 | 9.8 | 410 | 22.8 |
| Career | St. FX | 72 | 551-1048 | 52.6 | 368-472 | 78.0 | 735 | 10.2 | 1470 | 20.4 |

== Professional ==
Hatch played professionally in Switzerland and Belgium for 7 seasons.

== Post-career recoginition ==
Hatch was inducted into the Nova Scotia Sport Hall of Fame in 2013 and into the St. FX Athletic Hall of Fame in 1996.

== Personal life ==
Hatch was born on February 23, 1962 in Calgary, Alberta.
