= Alan Kristmanson =

Canadian basketball player

Personal information
- Nationality: Canadian
- Born: 5 November 1961 (age 63) Vancouver, British Columbia, Canada
- Height: 201 cm (6 ft 7 in)
- Weight: 87 kg (192 lb)

Sport
- Sport: Basketball

Alan Kristmanson (born 5 November 1961) is a Canadian basketball player. He competed in the men's tournament at the 1988 Summer Olympics.
