= Tony Simms =

Canadian basketball player

Personal information
- Born: February 16, 1959 (age 67) Kingston, Jamaica
- Listed height: 6 ft 5 in (1.96 m)

Career information
- College: Boston University (1980–1983)
- NBA draft: 1983: 6th round, 128th overall pick
- Drafted by: New York Knicks
- Position: Shooting guard

Career highlights
- First-team All-ECAC North (1983)
- Stats at Basketball Reference

Tony Simms (born 16 February 1959) is a Canadian basketball player. He competed in the men's tournament at the 1984 Summer Olympics.
