= Basketball at the 1968 Summer Olympics – Men's team rosters =

Olympic basketball rosters

The following is the list of squads for each of the 16 teams that competed in the men's basketball tournament at the 1968 Summer Olympics.

== Group A ==
=== Italy ===
The following players represented Italy:

- Carlo Recalcati
- Enrico Bovone
- Gabriele Vianello
- Gianfranco Lombardi
- Gianluigi Jessi
- Guido Gatti
- Giusto Pellanera
- Massimo Cosmelli
- Massimo Masini
- Ottorino Flaborea
- Paolo Vittori
- Sauro Bufalini

=== Panama ===
The following players represented Panama:

- Calixto Malcom
- Davis Peralta
- Eliécer Ellis
- Ernesto Agard
- Francisco Checa
- Julio Osorio
- Luis Sinclair
- Nicolas Alvarado
- Norris Webb
- Pedro Rivas
- Percibal Blades
- Ramón Reyes

=== Philippines ===
The following players represented the Philippines:

- Jun Papa
- Alberto Reynoso
- Alfonso Márquez
- Danny Florencio
- Ed Ocampo
- Elias Tolentino
- Jimmy Mariano
- Joaquín Rojas
- Orly Bauzon
- Renato Reyes
- Robert Jaworski
- Rogelio Melencio

=== Puerto Rico ===
The following players represented Puerto Rico:

- Adolfo Porrata
- Alberto Zamot
- Ángel Cancel
- Francisco Córdova
- Jaime Frontera
- Mariano Ortiz
- Raymond Dalmau
- Rubén Adorno
- Teo Cruz
- Tomás Gutiérrez
- Bill McCadney
- Joe Hatton

=== Senegal ===
The following players represented Senegal:

- Alioune Badara Guèye
- Babacar Seck
- Boubacar Traoré
- Cheikh Amadou Fall
- Claude Constantino
- Claude Sadio
- Doudas Leydi Camara
- Moussa Sène
- Moussa Narou N'Diaye
- Papa Malick Diop
- Babacar Dia
- Mansour Diagne

=== Spain ===
The following players represented Spain:

- Alfonso Martínez
- Antonio Nava
- Cliff Luyk
- Emiliano Rodríguez
- Enrique Margall
- Francisco Buscató
- Jesús Codina
- José Sagi-Vela
- Juan Antonio Martínez
- Lorenzo Alocén
- Luis Carlos Santiago
- Vicente Ramos

=== United States ===
The following players represented the United States:

- John Clawson
- Ken Spain
- Jo Jo White
- Mike Barrett
- Spencer Haywood
- Charlie Scott
- Bill Hosket Jr.
- Calvin Fowler
- Mike Silliman
- Glynn Saulters
- Jim King
- Don Dee

=== Yugoslavia ===
The following players represented Yugoslavia:

Yugoslavia men's national basketball team roster
Players
Coaches

Pos.	No.	Name	Age – Date of birth	Height	Club
F	4	Aljoša Zorga	21 – 25 February 1947	2.00 m (6 ft 7 in)	AŠK Olimpija	(Socialist Federal Republic of Yugoslavia)
PF	5	Radivoj Korać	29 – 5 November 1938	1.95 m (6 ft 5 in)	Standard Liège	(Belgium)
F	6	Zoran Marojević	26 – 27 April 1942	2.04 m (6 ft 8 in)	OKK Beograd	(Socialist Federal Republic of Yugoslavia)
C	7	Trajko Rajković	30 – 7 December 1937	2.04 m (6 ft 8 in)	Libertas Livorno	(Italy)
F	8	Vladimir Cvetković	27 – 24 May 1941	1.96 m (6 ft 5 in)	Crvena zvezda	(Socialist Federal Republic of Yugoslavia)
SF	9	Dragoslav Ražnatović	27 – 19 April 1941	1.90 m (6 ft 3 in)	Radnički Belgrade	(Socialist Federal Republic of Yugoslavia)
PG	10	Ivo Daneu	31 – 6 October 1937	1.91 m (6 ft 3 in)	AŠK Olimpija	(Socialist Federal Republic of Yugoslavia)
C	11	Krešimir Ćosić	19 – 26 November 1948	2.11 m (6 ft 11 in)	Zadar	(Socialist Federal Republic of Yugoslavia)
SF	12	Damir Šolman	19 – 7 September 1949	2.00 m (6 ft 7 in)	Mladost Zagreb	(Socialist Federal Republic of Yugoslavia)
PG	13	Nikola Plećaš	20 – 10 January 1948	1.87 m (6 ft 2 in)	Lokomotiva Zagreb	(Socialist Federal Republic of Yugoslavia)
SG	14	Dragutin Čermak	24 – 12 October 1944	1.97 m (6 ft 6 in)	Radnički Belgrade	(Socialist Federal Republic of Yugoslavia)
C	15	Petar Skansi	24 – 23 November 1943	2.06 m (6 ft 9 in)	Jugoplastika	(Socialist Federal Republic of Yugoslavia)

Head coach

- (Socialist Federal Republic of Yugoslavia) Ranko Žeravica

Legend

- Club – describes last
  club before the tournament
- Age – describes age
  on 13 October 1968

== Group B ==
=== Brazil ===
The following players represented Brazil:

- Sucar
- Mosquito
- Rosa Branca
- Celso Scarpini
- Hélio Rubens Garcia
- Zé Geraldo
- Edvar Simões
- José Aparecido
- Luiz Menon
- Sérgio Macarrão
- Bira
- Wlamir Marques

=== Bulgaria ===
The following players represented Bulgaria:

- Boycho Branzov
- Dimitar Sakhanikov
- Emil Mikhaylov
- Georgi Khristov
- Ivaylo Kirov
- Khristo Doychinov
- Mincho Dimov
- Pando Pandov
- Slavey Raychev
- Stanislav Boyadzhiev
- Stefan Filipov
- Valentin Spasov

=== Cuba ===
The following players represented Cuba:

- Carlos del Pozo
- César Valdés
- Conrado Pérez
- Franklin Standard
- Inocente Cuesta
- Jacinto González
- Miguel Calderón
- Miguel Montalvo
- Pablo García
- Pedro Chappé
- Rafael Cañizares
- Ruperto Herrera

=== Mexico ===
The following players represented Mexico:

Mexico men's national basketball team roster
Players
Coaches

Pos.	No.	Name	Age – Date of birth	Height	Club
	11	Alejandro Guzmán	22 – 8 December 1945	1.93 m (6 ft 4 in)
	8	Antonio Ayala	21 – 2 February 1947	2.00 m (6 ft 7 in)
	5	Arturo Guerrero	20 – 30 August 1948	1.92 m (6 ft 4 in)
	12	Carlos Quintanar	29 – 2 June 1939	1.94 m (6 ft 4 in)
	6	Fernando Tiscareño	23 – 12 August 1945	1.86 m (6 ft 1 in)
	14	John Hatch	21 – 4 January 1947	1.94 m (6 ft 4 in)
	10	Luis Grajeda	31 – 21 June 1937	1.79 m (5 ft 10 in)
	15	Manuel Raga	24 – 15 March 1944	1.87 m (6 ft 2 in)
	12	Miguel Arellano	27 – 10 February 1941	1.87 m (6 ft 2 in)
	13	Óscar Asiáin	19 – 21 February 1949	1.80 m (5 ft 11 in)
	14	Rafael Heredia	31 – 19 February 1937	1.90 m (6 ft 3 in)
	15	Rico Pontvianne	24 – 20 November 1943	1.89 m (6 ft 2 in)

Head coach

- (United States) Lester Lane

Legend

- Club – describes last
  club before the tournament
- Age – describes age
  on 13 October 1968

The following players represented Mexico:

=== Morocco ===
The following players represented Morocco:

- Abdel Jabbar Bel Gnaoui
- Mohammed Alaoui
- Abdel Wahed Ben Siamar Mimun
- Abderrahmane Sebbar
- Abderraouf Laghrissi
- Allal Bel Caid
- Farouk Dioury
- Fathallah Bouazzaoui
- Khalil El-Yamani
- Moukhtar Sayed
- Moulay Ahmed Riadh
- Noureddine Cherradi

=== Poland ===
The following players represented Poland:

- Adam Niemiec
- Andrzej Kasprzak
- Bohdan Likszo
- Bolesław Kwiatkowski
- Czesław Malec
- Edward Jurkiewicz
- Grzegorz Korcz
- Henryk Cegielski
- Kazimierz Frelkiewicz
- Mieczysław Łopatka
- Włodzimierz Trams
- Andrzej Pasiorowski

=== South Korea ===
The following players represented South Korea:

- Choi Jong-gyu
- Ha Ui-geon
- Kim In-geon
- Kim Mu-hyeon
- Kim Yeong-il
- Gwak Hyeon-chae
- Lee Byeong-gu
- Lee In-pyo
- Park Han
- Shin Dong-pa
- Yu Hui-hyeong

=== Soviet Union ===
The following players represented the Soviet Union:

- Anatoli Krikun
- Modestas Paulauskas
- Zurab Sakandelidze
- Vadim Kapranov
- Yuri Selikhov
- Anatoli Polivoda
- Sergei Belov
- Priit Tomson
- Sergei Kovalenko
- Gennadi Volnov
- Jaak Lipso
- Vladimir Andreyev
