= Luis Santiago (disambiguation) =

Luis Santiago may refer to:

- Luis Santiago (1977–2005), a Filipino TV director
- Luis Carlos Santiago (1989–2010), a Mexican journalist
- Luis Carlos Santiago Zabaleta (born 1946), a Spanish basketball player
