= Basketball at the Summer Olympics =

- IOC Code: BKB
- Governing body: FIBA
- Events: 4 (men: 2; women: 2)

Summer Olympics
- 1896; 1900; 1904; 1908; 1912; 1920; 1924; 1928; 1932; 1936; 1948; 1952; 1956; 1960; 1964; 1968; 1972; 1976; 1980; 1984; 1988; 1992; 1996; 2000; 2004; 2008; 2012; 2016; 2020; 2024; 2028; 2032; Note: demonstration or exhibition sport years indicated in italics
- Medalists

Basketball at the Summer Olympics has been a sport for men consistently since 1936. Prior to its inclusion as a medal sport, basketball was held as an unofficial demonstration event in 1904 and 1924. Women's basketball made its debut in the Summer Olympics in 1976. FIBA organizes both the men's and women's FIBA World Olympic Qualifying Tournaments and the Summer Olympics basketball tournaments, which are sanctioned by the IOC.

The United States is by far the most successful country in Olympic basketball, with United States men's teams having won 17 of 20 tournaments in which they participated, including seven consecutive titles from 1936 through 1968. United States women's teams have won 10 titles out of the 12 tournaments in which they competed, including eight in a row from 1996 to 2024. Besides the United States, Argentina is the only nation still in existence which has won either the men's or women's tournament. The Soviet Union, Yugoslavia and the Unified Team are the countries no longer in existence who have won the tournament. The United States are the defending champions in both men's and women's tournaments.

On 9 June 2017, the Executive Board of the International Olympic Committee announced that 3x3 basketball would become an official Olympic sport as of the 2020 Summer Olympics in Tokyo, Japan, for both men and women.

== History ==
Basketball was invented by James Naismith in Springfield, Massachusetts, in 1891. Within a few decades, the new game became popular throughout the United States as an indoor sport. The popularity spread overseas and the International Basketball Federation (FIBA) was organized in 1932 in Geneva, Switzerland. The Young Men's Christian Association (YMCA) had a big part in the spread of this sport to many countries, and as many as 21 teams competed in the first Olympic basketball tournament.

=== American dominance ===
Thanks in part to the effort of Phog Allen—a Kansas Jayhawks collegiate coach—the first Olympic basketball tournament was organized in the 1936 Berlin Olympics on outdoor tennis courts. Dr. Naismith presented the medals to the top three teams. According to the Olympic rules of that time, all of the competitors were amateurs. The tournament was held indoors for the first time in 1948. The American team proved its dominance, winning the first seven Olympic tournaments through 1968, without losing a single game. While the Americans were barred from sending a team that contained players from the professional National Basketball Association, they instead sent in college players; teams from some other countries sent in their best players, as some of their players were classified as "amateur" by FIBA, by earning allowances instead of wages.

=== Munich and after ===
The U.S. winning streak ended in 1972, when the Soviet Union controversially won the gold medal game against the United States by one point.

The U.S. team reclaimed the gold medal in 1976, with Yugoslavia, which had beaten the Soviet Union in the semifinal, finishing runner-up for the second time. In 1980, with the Americans' absence due to the boycott, Yugoslavia became the third team to win the title, after beating the Soviets anew in the semifinals and Italy in the final. The Americans regained the title in 1984, by beating Spain in the final, with the Soviets boycotting this time. The Soviets won the gold medal for the second time in 1988, after beating the U.S. team for the second time in the semifinal, and the Yugoslavs in the gold medal game.

=== Professional era: renewed American dominance ===
The advent of the state-sponsored "full-time amateur athlete" of the Eastern Bloc countries eroded the ideology of the pure amateur, as it put the self-financed amateurs of the Western countries at a disadvantage. The Soviet Union entered teams of athletes who were all nominally listed in the military, but all of whom were in fact paid by the state to train full-time. In April 1989, through the leadership of Secretary General Borislav Stanković, FIBA approved the rule that allowed NBA players to compete in international tournaments, including the Olympics. In the 1992 Summer Olympics, the U.S. "Dream Team" won the gold medal with an average winning margin of 44 points per game, and without calling a timeout. By this time, the Soviet Union and Yugoslavia no longer existed, but their successor states continued to be among the leading forces. Two newly independent countries of the former Yugoslavia and Soviet Union, Croatia and Lithuania, won the silver and bronze medals respectively.

The American team repeated its victory in 1996 and 2000, but its performance was not as dominant as in 1992. Since active NBA players have been allowed to compete in the Summer Olympics, the 1996 Games in Atlanta is the only instance where the Olympic host city also had a home NBA team — the Hawks. Yugoslavia was the runner-up in Atlanta, and France in Sydney, with Lithuania winning bronze again on both occasions.

The renewed dominance of the U.S. was interrupted in 2004, when the Americans barely made it to the semifinal, after losing to Puerto Rico and Lithuania in the preliminaries; Argentina defeated them in the semifinals, on their way to a gold medal finish, where they beat Italy in the final, and became the fourth team to win the Olympic title.

The Americans regrouped in 2008, beating the reigning FIBA world champions, Spain, in the gold medal game, with the Argentines beating the Lithuanians in the bronze medal game. The Americans and the Spaniards met again in the 2012 gold medal game, with the U.S. again winning, although with the closest winning margin for the American team. The U.S. won again in 2016, defeating Serbia in the gold medal game, a rematch of the 2014 FIBA Basketball World Cup Final, after eliminating Spain, who settled for bronze. The American team defended their title by winning again at the 2020 Games in Tokyo, extending their run to four consecutive gold medal finishes, and seven out of the last eight.

=== Women ===
The first women's tournament was staged in the 1976 Summer Olympics. The Soviet Union won five straight games, becoming the inaugural champion. The next two tournaments followed the six-team round-robin format, with the Soviets defending their title in 1980 amid the U.S.-led boycott, and the U.S. winning in 1984, against the South Koreans, amid the Soviet-led boycott. In 1988, the tournament expanded into eight teams, with the Americans beating Yugoslavia in the gold medal game. In 1992, the Unified Team, consisting of the former Soviet republics, defeated China in the gold medal game. In 1996, the tournament settled into its current 12-team format; the U.S. has swept all of the tournaments since then, winning 61 consecutive games. Their run represents the longest gold medal streak in Olympic basketball history and the longest period of dominance by any team in an Olympic team sport. During this period, the program featured multiple generations of prominent players, including Lisa Leslie, Diana Taurasi, Sue Bird, Tamika Catchings, and Breanna Stewart. National teams from countries such as Australia, Spain, France and China emerged as consistent medal contenders during this era amidst the rise of women's basketball worldwide.

== Venues ==
All venues were indoor stadiums except for the 1936 tournament, which was held outdoors on lawn tennis courts.

- (Germany) Berlin 1936: Reichssportfeld, Berlin
- (United Kingdom) London 1948: Harringay Arena, London
- (Finland) Helsinki 1952: Tennis Palace and Messuhalli II, both in Helsinki
- (Australia) Melbourne 1956: Royal Exhibition Building, Melbourne
- (Italy) Rome 1960: Sports Arena and Sports Palace, Rome
- (Japan) Tokyo 1964: Yoyogi National Gymnasium, Tokyo
- Mexico City 1968: Palacio de los Deportes, Mexico City
- (West Germany) Munich 1972: Basketballhalle, Munich
- (Canada) Montreal 1976: Étienne Desmarteau Centre and the Montreal Forum, Montreal
- (Soviet Union) Moscow 1980: CSCA Sports Palace and Olimpiysky Stadium, Moscow
- (United States) Los Angeles 1984: The Forum, Inglewood
- (South Korea) Seoul 1988: Jamsil Arena, Seoul
- (Spain) Barcelona 1992: Pavelló Olímpic de Badalona, Badalona
- (United States) Atlanta 1996: Forbes Arena and the Georgia Dome, Atlanta
- (Australia) Sydney 2000: The Dome and Sydney SuperDome, Parramatta
- (Greece) Athens 2004: Hellinikon Indoor Arena and the Olympic Indoor Hall, Elliniko and Marousi
- (China) Beijing 2008: Wukesong Indoor Stadium, Beijing
- (United Kingdom) London 2012: Olympic Basketball Arena and The O2 Arena, (Note: The O2 Arena was known as the North Greenwich Arena during the games due to Olympics regulations regarding corporate sponsorship of event sites.) London
- (Brazil) Rio de Janeiro 2016: Carioca Arena 1 and the Youth Arena, Rio de Janeiro
- (Japan) Tokyo 2020: Saitama Super Arena, Saitama
- (France) Paris 2024: Accor Arena (Note: The Accor Arena is known as the Bercy Arena during the games due to Olympics regulations regarding corporate sponsorship of event sites.), Paris and Stade Pierre-Mauroy, Villeneuve-d'Ascq
- (United States) Los Angeles 2028: Crypto.com Arena, (Note: Due to Olympic regulations regarding corporate sponsorship of event sites, this venue will be known by a yet-to-be-determined name during the Games.) the Los Angeles Convention Center, both in Los Angeles, and the Intuit Dome, Inglewood
- (Australia) Brisbane 2032: Brisbane Indoor Sports Centre, Brisbane and the Sunshine Coast Indoor Sports Centre, Kawana Waters

== Qualifying ==
As of 2012, the qualifying process consists of three stages:

1. 1 team (for each gender) qualifies as the reigning world champion.
2. 7 teams for men and 5 for women qualify through their respective regional championships.
3. 3 teams for men and 5 for women qualify through a world qualifying tournament, in which the best teams which did not qualify directly from each zone compete for the remaining berths.

Additionally, the teams of the host nation qualify automatically.

Zone	Men	Women
World Cup	1	1
African championship	1	1
Americas championship	2	1
Asian championship	1	1
European championship	2	1
Oceania championship	1	1
World qualifying tournament	3	5
Host Nation	1	1
Total	12	12

In 2020, the men's tournament will have a new qualification system. After the 2019 FIBA World Cup, seven teams will qualify directly: the top two European and American teams, and the top team from Africa, Asia and Oceania. The next 16 best teams from the FIBA World Cup will join the two teams from each continent at the Olympic qualifiers. It will feature four groups of six teams, where the best team of each group will get the remaining spots at the Olympics. The continental championships will no longer be used for Olympic qualifying.

== Men ==
=== Summaries ===
Year	Hosts	Gold medal game			Bronze medal game		
Year	Hosts	Gold	Score	Silver	Bronze	Score	Fourth place
1936	(Germany); Berlin	United States	19–8	Canada	Mexico	26–12	Poland
1948	(United Kingdom); London	United States (2)	65–21	France	Brazil	52–47	Mexico
1952	(Finland); Helsinki	United States (3)	36–25	Soviet Union	Uruguay	68–59	Argentina
1956	(Australia); Melbourne	United States (4)	89–55	Soviet Union	Uruguay	71–62	France
1960	(Italy); Rome	United States (5)	81–57	Soviet Union	Brazil	78–75	Italy
1964	(Japan); Tokyo	United States (6)	73–59	Soviet Union	Brazil	76–60	Puerto Rico
1968	Mexico City	United States (7)	65–50	Yugoslavia	Soviet Union	70–53	Brazil
1972	(West Germany); Munich	Soviet Union	51–50	United States	Cuba	66–65	Italy
1976	(Canada); Montreal	United States (8)	95–74	Yugoslavia	Soviet Union	100–72	Canada
1980	(Soviet Union); Moscow	Yugoslavia	86–77	Italy (Note: Several teams competed under the Olympic Flag in support for the 1980 Summer Olympics boycott.)	Soviet Union	117–94	Spain
1984	(United States); Los Angeles	United States (9)	96–65	Spain	Yugoslavia	88–82	Canada
1988	(South Korea); Seoul	Soviet Union (2)	76–63	Yugoslavia	United States	78–49	Australia
1992	(Spain); Barcelona	United States (10)	117–85	Croatia	Lithuania	82–78	Unified Team
1996	(United States); Atlanta	United States (11)	95–69	FR Yugoslavia	Lithuania	80–74	Australia
2000	(Australia); Sydney	United States (12)	85–75	France	Lithuania	89–71	Australia
2004	(Greece); Athens	Argentina	84–69	Italy	United States	104–96	Lithuania
2008	(China); Beijing	United States (13)	118–107	Spain	Argentina	87–75	Lithuania
2012	(United Kingdom); London	United States (14)	107–100	Spain	Russia	81–77	Argentina
2016	(Brazil); Rio de Janeiro	United States (15)	96–66	Serbia	Spain	89–88	Australia
2020 (Note: The 2020 Summer Olympics were held in 2021 due to the COVID-19 pandemic.)	(Japan); Tokyo	United States (16)	87–82	France	Australia	107–93	Slovenia
2024	(France); Paris	United States (17)	98–87	France	Serbia	93–83	Germany
2028	(United States); Los Angeles						

=== Medal table ===
Updated after the gold medal match of the 2024 Olympic tournament.

Rank	Nation	Gold	Silver	Bronze	Total
1	United States	17	1	2	20
2	Soviet Union	2	4	3	9
3	Yugoslavia	1	3	1	5
4	Argentina	1	0	1	2
5	France	0	4	0	4
6	Spain	0	3	1	4
7	Italy	0	2	0	2
8	Serbia	0	1	1	2
9	Canada	0	1	0	1
9	Croatia	0	1	0	1
9	Serbia and Montenegro	0	1	0	1
12	Brazil	0	0	3	3
12	Lithuania	0	0	3	3
14	Uruguay	0	0	2	2
15	Australia	0	0	1	1
15	Cuba	0	0	1	1
15	Mexico	0	0	1	1
15	Russia	0	0	1	1
Totals (18 entries)		21	21	21	63

- The Soviet Union (as of 1992) and Yugoslavia (as of 2006) are defunct. No team carried over the records of these nations.
- Yugoslavia has been the designation from two distinct national entities: Socialist Federal Republic of Yugoslavia from 1948 to 1988 formed as a joint state of 6 republics; Federal Republic of Yugoslavia from 1996 to 2006 formed as a joint state by only Montenegro and Serbia. In 2003, Federal Republic of Yugoslavia was renamed to Serbia and Montenegro, however both Federal Republic of Yugoslavia and Serbia and Montenegro represented the same national entity: a joint state of Serbia and Montenegro.

=== Performance by confederation ===
This is a summary of the best performances of each confederation in each tournament.

Confederation	1936 (Nazi Germany)	1948 (United Kingdom)	1952 (Finland)	1956 (Australia)	1960 (Italy)	1964 (Japan)	1968 (Mexico)	1972 (West Germany)	1976 (Canada)	1980 (Soviet Union)	1984 (United States)	1988 (South Korea)	1992 (Spain)	1996 (United States)	2000 (Australia)	2004 (Greece)	2008 (China)	2012 (United Kingdom)	2016 (Brazil)	2020 (Japan)	2024 (France)
FIBA Africa	15th–18th	19th	9th–16th	–	–	–	15th	15th	12th	11th	12th	10th	10th	11th	12th	12th	12th	10th	11th	10th	9th
FIBA Americas	1st	1st	1st	1st	1st	1st	1st	2nd	1st	5th	1st	3rd	1st	1st	1st	1st	1st	1st	1st	1st	1st
FIBA Asia	5th	8th	9th–16th	7th	11th	10th	13th	13th	11th	12th	10th	9th	12th	8th	10th	8th	8th	12th	12th	11th	11th
FIBA Europe	4th	2nd	2nd	2nd	2nd	2nd	2nd	1st	2nd	1st	2nd	1st	2nd	2nd	2nd	2nd	2nd	2nd	2nd	2nd	2nd
FIBA Oceania	–	–	–	12th	–	9th	–	9th	8th	8th	7th	4th	6th	4th	4th	9th	7th	7th	4th	3rd	6th
Nations	21	23	23	15	16	16	16	16	12	12	12	12	12	12	12	12	12	12	12	12	12

=== Participating nations ===
Nation	1936 (Nazi Germany)	1948 (United Kingdom)	1952 (Finland)	1956 (Australia)	1960 (Italy)	1964 (Japan)	1968 (Mexico)	1972 (West Germany)	1976 (Canada)	1980 (Soviet Union)	1984 (United States)	1988 (South Korea)	1992 (Spain)	1996 (United States)	2000 (Australia)	2004 (Greece)	2008 (China)	2012 (United Kingdom)	2016 (Brazil)	2020 (Japan)	2024 (France)	2028 (United States)	Appearances
Angola	^{A}												10th	11th	12th	12th	12th						5
Argentina		15th	4th											9th		1st	3rd	4th	8th	7th			8
Australia				12th		9th		9th	8th	8th	7th	4th	6th	4th	4th	9th	7th	7th	4th	3rd	6th		16
Belgium	19th	11th	17th																				3
Brazil	9th	3rd	6th	6th	3rd	3rd	4th	7th		5th	9th	5th	5th	6th				5th	9th		7th		16
Bulgaria			7th	5th	16th		10th																4
Canada	2nd	9th	9th	9th		14th			4th		4th	6th			7th						5th		10
Central African Republic	^{A}											10th											1
Chile	9th	6th	5th	8th																			4
China	15th	18th			^{A}						10th	11th	12th	8th	10th	8th	8th	12th	12th				11
Chinese Taipei^{B}	^{B}	^{B}		11th																			1
Croatia	^{C}												2nd	7th			6th		5th				4
Cuba		13th	9th				11th	3rd	7th	6th													6
Czech Republic	^{K}																			9th			1
Czechoslovakia	9th	7th	9th		5th			8th	6th	9th				^{A}									7
Egypt	15th	19th	9th					16th	12th		12th	12th											7
Estonia	9th	^{D}																					1
Finland			9th			11th																	2
France	19th	2nd	8th	4th	10th						11th				2nd			6th	6th	2nd	2nd		11
Germany^{E}	15th							12th			8th		7th				10th			8th	4th		7
Great Britain		20th																9th					2
Greece			17th											5th		5th	5th				8th		5
Hungary		16th	9th		9th	13th																	4
India										12th													1
Iran		14th															11th			12th			3
Iraq		22nd																					1
Ireland		23rd																					1
Israel	^{A}		17th																				1
Italy	7th	17th	17th		4th	5th	8th	4th	5th	2nd	5th				5th	2nd				5th			13
Japan	9th			10th	15th	10th		14th	11th											11th	11th		8
Latvia	15th	^{D}																					1
Lithuania		^{D}											3rd	3rd	3rd	4th	4th	8th	7th				7
Mexico	3rd	4th	9th		12th	12th	5th		10th														7
Morocco	^{A}						16th																1
New Zealand															11th	10th							2
Nigeria																		10th	11th	10th			3
Panama							12th																1
Peru	8th	10th				15th																	3
Philippines	5th	12th	9th	7th	11th		13th	13th															7
Poland	4th				7th	6th	6th	10th		7th													6
Puerto Rico	^{A}				13th	4th	9th	6th	9th			7th	8th	10th		6th					12th		10
Romania			17th																				1
Russia	^{D}												^{F}		8th		9th	3rd					3
Senegal	^{A}						15th	15th		11th													3
Serbia	^{G}															^{H}			2nd		3rd		2
Serbia and Montenegro	^{G}															11th	^{A}						1
Singapore	^{A}			13th		^{I}																	1
Slovenia	^{C}																			4th			1
South Korea	^{A}	8th		14th		16th	14th					9th		12th									6
South Sudan	^{A}																				9th		1
Soviet Union	^{J}		2nd	2nd	2nd	2nd	3rd	1st	3rd	3rd		1st	^{F}	^{A}									9
Spain					14th		7th	11th		4th	2nd	8th	9th		9th	7th	2nd	2nd	3rd	6th	10th		14
Sweden										10th													1
Switzerland	9th	21st	17th																				3
Thailand	^{A}			15th																			1
Tunisia																		11th					1
Turkey	19th		17th																				2
Unified Team	^{D}												4th	^{A}									1
United States	1st	1st	1st	1st	1st	1st	1st	2nd	1st		1st	3rd	1st	1st	1st	3rd	1st	1st	1st	1st	1st	Q	21
Uruguay	6th	5th	3rd	3rd	8th	8th					6th												7
Venezuela													11th						10th				2
Yugoslavia					6th	7th	2nd	5th	2nd	1st	3rd	2nd		2nd	6th	^{A}							10
Nations	21	23	23	15	16	16	16	16	12	12	12	12	12	12	12	12	12	12	12	12	12	12	

==== Notes ====
^{^A} The NOC was not member of the IOC.
^{^B} As (Taiwan) Republic of China/Formosa from 1952 to 1981.
^{^B} Mainland China as part of China; Taiwan as part of Japan
^{^B} As part of China
^{^C} Part of (Socialist Federal Republic of Yugoslavia) Yugoslavia from 1936 to 1988.
^{^D} Part of Soviet Union.
^{^E} As West Germany from 1968 to 1988.
^{^F} Part of Unified Team in 1992.
^{^G} Now Serbia, part of Yugoslavia in 1936–1988, as Independent Olympic Participants in 1992 and part of FR Yugoslavia in 1996–2000.
^{^H} Part of Serbia and Montenegro in 2004.
^{^I} Part of Malaysia in 1964.
^{^J} The Soviet Union chose not to compete in 1936 and 1948.
^{^K} Part of Czechoslovakia from 1920 to 1992.

== Women ==
=== Summaries ===
Year	Hosts	Gold medal game			Bronze medal game		
Year	Hosts	Gold	Score	Silver	Bronze	Score	Fourth place
1976	(Canada); Montreal	Soviet Union	112–77	United States	Bulgaria	67–66	Czechoslovakia
1980	(Soviet Union); Moscow	Soviet Union (2)	104–73	Bulgaria	Yugoslavia	68–65	Hungary
1984	(United States); Los Angeles	United States	85–55	South Korea	China	63–57	Canada
1988	(South Korea); Seoul	United States (2)	77–70	Yugoslavia	Soviet Union	68–53	Australia
1992	(Spain); Barcelona	Unified Team	76–66	China	United States	88–74	Cuba
1996	(United States); Atlanta	United States (3)	111–87	Brazil	Australia	66–56	Ukraine
2000	(Australia); Sydney	United States (4)	76–54	Australia	Brazil	84–73 (OT)	South Korea
2004	(Greece); Athens	United States (5)	74–63	Australia	Russia	71–62	Brazil
2008	(China); Beijing	United States (6)	92–65	Australia	Russia	94–81	China
2012	(United Kingdom); London	United States (7)	86–50	France	Australia	83–74	Russia
2016	(Brazil); Rio de Janeiro	United States (8)	101–72	Spain	Serbia	70–63	France
2020 (Note: The 2020 Summer Olympics were held in 2021 due to the COVID-19 pandemic.)	(Japan); Tokyo	United States (9)	90–75	Japan	France	91–76	Serbia
2024	(France); Paris	United States (10)	67–66	France	Australia	85–81	Belgium
2028	(United States); Los Angeles						

=== Medal table ===
Source: FIBA

Rank	Nation	Gold	Silver	Bronze	Total
1	United States	10	1	1	12
2	Soviet Union	2	0	1	3
3	Unified Team	1	0	0	1
4	Australia	0	3	3	6
5	France	0	2	1	3
6	Brazil	0	1	1	2
6	Bulgaria	0	1	1	2
6	China	0	1	1	2
6	Yugoslavia	0	1	1	2
10	Japan	0	1	0	1
10	South Korea	0	1	0	1
10	Spain	0	1	0	1
13	Russia	0	0	2	2
14	Serbia	0	0	1	1
Totals (14 entries)		13	13	13	39

- Soviet Union (as of 1992) and Yugoslavia (as of 2006) are defunct. No team carried over the records of these nations.
- Yugoslavia has been the designation from two distinct national entities: Socialist Federal Republic of Yugoslavia from 1948 to 1988 formed as a joint state of 6 republics; Federal Republic of Yugoslavia from 1996 to 2006 formed as a joint state by only Montenegro and Serbia.

=== Performance by confederation ===
This is a summary of the best performances of each confederation in each tournament.

Confederation	1976 (Canada)	1980 (Soviet Union)	1984 (United States)	1988 (South Korea)	1992 (Spain)	1996 (United States)	2000 (Australia)	2004 (Greece)	2008 (China)	2012 (United Kingdom)	2016 (Brazil)	2020 (Japan)	2024 (France)
FIBA Africa	–	–	–	–	–	12th	12th	11th	12th	12th	12th	11th	8th
FIBA Americas	2nd	5th	1st	1st	3rd	1st	1st	1st	1st	1st	1st	1st	1st
FIBA Asia	5th	–	2nd	6th	2nd	7th	4th	9th	4th	5th	8th	2nd	9th
FIBA Europe	1st	1st	6th	2nd	1st	4th	5th	3rd	3rd	2nd	2nd	3rd	2nd
FIBA Oceania	–	–	5th	4th	–	3rd	2nd	2nd	2nd	3rd	5th	8th	3rd
Nations	6	6	6	8	8	12	12	12	12	12	12	12	12

=== Participating nations ===
Nation	1976 (Canada)	1980 (Soviet Union)	1984 (United States)	1988 (South Korea)	1992 (Spain)	1996 (United States)	2000 (Australia)	2004 (Greece)	2008 (China)	2012 (United Kingdom)	2016 (Brazil)	2020 (Japan)	2024 (France)	2028 (United States)	Years
Angola										12th					1
Australia			5th	4th		3rd	2nd	2nd	2nd	3rd	5th	8th	3rd		10
Belarus	^{B}				^{C}				6th		9th				2
Belgium												7th	4th		2
Brazil					7th	2nd	3rd	4th	11th	9th	11th				7
Bulgaria	3rd	2nd		5th											3
Canada	6th		4th			11th	10th			8th	7th	9th	11th		8
China	^{A}		3rd	6th	2nd	9th		9th	4th	6th	10th	5th	9th		10
Croatia	^{F}									10th					1
Cuba		5th			4th	6th	9th								4
Czech Republic	^{D}							5th	7th	7th					3
Czechoslovakia	4th			8th	6th	^{A}									3
DR Congo^{E}						12th									1
France							5th			2nd	4th	3rd	2nd		5
Germany													7th		1
Great Britain										11th					1
Greece								7th							1
Hungary		4th													1
Italy		6th			8th	8th									3
Japan	5th					7th		10th			8th	2nd	12th		6
Latvia	^{B}								9th						1
Mali									12th						1
New Zealand							11th	8th	10th						3
Nigeria								11th				11th	8th		3
Poland							8th								1
Puerto Rico												12th	10th		2
Russia	^{B}				^{C}	5th	6th	3rd	3rd	4th					5
Senegal							12th				12th				2
Serbia	^{F}										3rd	4th	6th		3
Slovakia	^{D}						7th								1
South Korea			2nd	7th		10th	4th	12th	8th			10th			7
Soviet Union	1st	1st		3rd	^{C}	^{A}									3
Spain					5th			6th	5th		2nd	6th	5th		6
Turkey										5th	6th				2
Ukraine	^{B}				^{C}	4th									1
Unified Team	^{A}				1st	^{A}									1
United States	2nd		1st	1st	3rd	1st	1st	1st	1st	1st	1st	1st	1st	Q	13
Yugoslavia		3rd	6th	2nd				^{A}							3
Nations	6	6	6	8	8	12	12	12	12	12	12	12	12	12	

==== Notes ====
^{^A} NOC was not member of IOC
^{^B} competed as part of Soviet Union from 1952–88
^{^C} part of Unified Team in 1992
^{^D} part of Czechoslovakia from 1920–92
^{^E} as Zaire from 1984–96
^{^F} part of "Yugoslavia" from 1976–2000 and "Serbia and Montenegro" in 2004

== Overall medal table ==
Rank	Nation	Gold	Silver	Bronze	Total
1	United States	27	2	3	32
2	Soviet Union	4	4	4	12
3	Yugoslavia	1	4	2	7
4	Argentina	1	0	1	2
5	Unified Team	1	0	0	1
6	France	0	6	1	7
7	Spain	0	4	1	5
8	Australia	0	3	4	7
9	Italy	0	2	0	2
10	Brazil	0	1	4	5
11	Serbia	0	1	2	3
12	Bulgaria	0	1	1	2
12	China	0	1	1	2
14	Canada	0	1	0	1
14	Croatia	0	1	0	1
14	Japan	0	1	0	1
14	Serbia and Montenegro	0	1	0	1
14	South Korea	0	1	0	1
19	Lithuania	0	0	3	3
19	Russia	0	0	3	3
21	Uruguay	0	0	2	2
22	Cuba	0	0	1	1
22	Mexico	0	0	1	1
Totals (23 entries)		34	34	34	102

- Soviet Union (as of 1992) and Yugoslavia (as of 2006) are defunct. No team carried over the records of these nations.
- Yugoslavia has been the designation from two distinct national entities: Socialist Federal Republic of Yugoslavia from 1948 to 1988 formed as a joint state of 6 republics; Federal Republic of Yugoslavia from 1996 to 2006 formed as a joint state by only Montenegro and Serbia. In 2003, Federal Republic of Yugoslavia was renamed to Serbia and Montenegro, however both Federal Republic of Yugoslavia and Serbia and Montenegro represented the same national entity: a joint state of Montenegro and Serbia.

== Win–loss records ==
=== Men's tournament ===
Team	Games played	Wins	Losses	Winning percentage
Angola	31	3	28	.097
Argentina	57	33	24	.579
Australia	115	58	57	.504
Belgium	13	6	7	.462
Brazil	115	66	49	.574
Bulgaria	33	16	17	.485
Canada	70	39	31	.557
Central African Republic	7	2	5	.286
Chile	26	12	14	.462
China	50	7	43	.140
Chinese Taipei	28	16	12	.571
Croatia	28	16	12	.571
Cuba	45	22	23	.489
Czechoslovakia	46	23	23	.500
Czech Republic	3	1	2	.333
Egypt	44	6	38	.136
Estonia	3	1	2	.333
Finland	12	4	8	.333
France	72	40	32	.556
Germany	44	15	29	.341
Great Britain	13	2	11	.154
Greece	28	14	14	.500
Hungary	33	14	19	.424
India	7	0	7	.000
Iran	15	2	13	.133
Iraq	7	0	7	.000
Ireland	6	0	6	.000
Israel	2	0	2	.000
Italy	95	56	39	.589
Japan	47	11	36	.234
Latvia	3	1	2	.333
Lithuania	52	32	20	.615
Mexico	49	26	23	.531
Morocco	9	0	9	.000
New Zealand	12	2	10	.167
Nigeria	13	2	11	.154
Panama	9	2	7	.222
Peru	22	9	13	.409
Philippines	52	25	27	.481
Poland	49	23	26	.469
Puerto Rico	75	34	41	.453
Romania	2	0	2	.000
Russia	20	10	10	.500
Senegal	24	2	22	.083
Serbia	41	23	18	.561
Singapore	7	2	5	.286
Slovenia	6	4	2	.667
South Korea	47	8	39	.170
South Sudan	3	1	2	.333
Soviet Union	74	61	13	.824
Spain	102	55	47	.539
Sweden	7	3	4	.429
Switzerland	13	4	9	.308
Thailand	7	0	7	.000
Tunisia	5	0	5	.000
Turkey	4	0	4	.000
Unified Team	8	5	3	.625
United States	155	149	6	.961
Uruguay	56	29	27	.518
Venezuela	12	3	9	.250
Yugoslavia	60	48	12	.800

As of 10 August 2024

=== Women's tournament ===
updated at the end of the 2024 Olympics (11 August 2024)

Team	Games played	Wins	Losses	Winning percentage
Angola	5	0	5	.000
Australia	66	45	21	.682
Belgium	10	4	6	.400
Brazil	44	19	25	.432
Belarus	11	3	8	.273
Bulgaria	16	10	6	.625
Canada	42	11	31	.262
China	55	26	29	.473
Croatia	5	1	4	.200
Cuba	24	9	15	.375
Czechoslovakia	15	3	12	.200
Czech Republic	19	8	11	.421
DR Congo	7	0	7	.000
France	35	23	12	.657
Germany	4	2	2	.500
Great Britain	5	0	5	.000
Greece	7	3	4	.429
Hungary	6	2	4	.333
Italy	18	3	15	.167
Japan	34	13	21	.382
Latvia	5	1	4	.200
Mali	5	0	5	.000
New Zealand	18	4	14	.222
Nigeria	13	3	10	.231
Poland	7	3	4	.429
Puerto Rico	6	0	6	.000
Russia	39	25	14	.641
Serbia	18	9	9	.500
Senegal	11	0	11	.000
Slovakia	7	3	4	.429
South Korea	41	15	26	.366
Soviet Union	16	14	2	.875
Spain	34	22	12	.647
Turkey	12	7	5	.583
Ukraine	8	4	4	.500
Unified Team	5	4	1	.800
United States	81	78	3	.963
Yugoslavia	16	8	8	.500

== Records ==
Category	Men	Women
Highest game score	229 points: USA 156–73 Nigeria (2012)	190 points: Japan 62–128 Brazil (2004)
Lowest game score	27 points: USA 19–8 Canada (1936)	100 points: Senegal 32–68 Slovakia (2000)
Biggest margin	100 points: Korea 120–20 Iraq (1948); China 125–25 Iraq (1948)	66 points: Japan 62–128 Brazil (2004); Italy 53–119 Soviet Union (1980)
Games with most overtimes	2 overtimes: Argentina 111–107 Brazil (2016); Canada 86–83 Russia (2000); Lithuania 83–81 Croatia (1996); Australia 109–101 Brazil (1996)	2 overtimes: Turkey 79–76 Brazil (2016); Spain 92–80 Italy (1992)
Longest winning streak	63 games: USA (1936–72)	58 games: USA (1992–2024)
All-time top cumulative scorer	1,093 points: Oscar Schmidt (Brazil)	581 points: Lauren Jackson (Australia)
All-time top average scorer	28.8 points per game: Oscar Schmidt (Brazil)	22 points per game: Lara Sanders (Turkey)
Single game scorer	55 points: Oscar Schmidt (Spain vs. Brazil, 1988)	39 points: Evladiya Slavcheva-Stefanova (Bulgaria vs. South Korea, 1988)

As of 4 August 2024

=== Top career scorers ===
The International Olympic Committee does not recognize records for basketball, although FIBA does.

==== Men ====
Total points scored
Player	PTS
(Brazil) Oscar Schmidt	1,093
(Australia) Andrew Gaze	789
(Spain) Pau Gasol	649
(Argentina) Luis Scola	591
(Australia) Patty Mills	567
(Brazil) Wlamir Marques	534
(Argentina) Manu Ginóbili	523
(United States) Kevin Durant	518
(Soviet Union) Sergei Belov	475
(Socialist Federal Republic of Yugoslavia) Dražen Dalipagić	461
(Socialist Federal Republic of Yugoslavia) (Croatia) Dražen Petrović	461

Points per game
Player	PTS	GP	PPG
(Brazil) Oscar Schmidt	1,093	38	28.8
(Poland) Mieczysław Młynarski	182	7	26.0
(Egypt) Mohamed Sayed Soliman	179	7	25.6
(Australia) Ed Palubinskas	409	16	25.6
(Croatia) Bojan Bogdanović	152	6	25.3
(Uruguay) Horacio López	199	8	24.9
(Panama) Davis Peralta	214	9	23.8
(Peru) Ricardo Duarte	212	9	23.6
(Italy) Antonello Riva	187	8	23.4
(South Korea) Lee Chung-hee	160	7	22.9

==== Women ====
Total points scored
Player	PTS
(Australia) Lauren Jackson	581
(Brazil) Janeth Arcain	535
(United States) Lisa Leslie	488
(United States) Diana Taurasi	384
(China) Chen Nan	317
(Brazil) Alessandra Santos de Oliveira	290
(China) Miao Lijie	284
(United States) Sheryl Swoopes	284
(China) Zheng Haixia	280
(South Korea) Jung Sun-min	276

Points per game
Player	PTS	GP	PPG
(Turkey) LaToya Sanders	132	6	22.0
(Soviet Union) Uljana Semjonova	131	6	21.8
(Nigeria) Mfon Udoka	130	6	21.7
(Greece) Evanthia Maltsi	146	7	20.9
(Poland) Margo Dydek	143	7	20.4
(Japan) Keiko Namai	102	5	20.4
(Socialist Federal Republic of Yugoslavia) Sofija Pekić	121	6	20.2
(Hungary) Lenke Jacsó-Kiss	120	6	20.0
(South Korea) Choi Kyung-hee	98	5	19.6
(Soviet Union) Uljana Semjonova	97	5	19.4

=== Top scorer per tournament ===
Year	Men	PPG	Women	PPG
1948	(Mexico) Ignacio Romo Porchas	21.0	—N/a	
1952	(Czechoslovakia) Ivan Mrázek	22.0	—N/a	
1956	(Uruguay) Oscar Moglia	26.0	—N/a	
1960	(Socialist Federal Republic of Yugoslavia) Radivoj Korać	23.6	—N/a	
1964	(Peru) Ricardo Duarte	23.6	—N/a	
1968	(Panama) Davis Peralta	23.8	—N/a	
1972	(Japan) Masatomo Taniguchi	23.9	—N/a	
1976	(Australia) Ed Palubinskas	31.3	(Japan) Keiko Namai	20.4
1980	(Australia) Ian Davies	29.3	(Soviet Union) Uljana Semjonova	21.8
1984	(Egypt) Mohamed Sayed Soliman	25.6	(South Korea) Kim Hwa-soon	16.8
1988	(Brazil) Oscar Schmidt	42.3	(South Korea) Choi Kyung-hee (Bulgaria) Evladiya Slavcheva	19.6
1992	(Brazil) Oscar Schmidt	24.8	(Brazil) Hortência Marcari	18.8
1996	(Brazil) Oscar Schmidt	27.4	(Cuba) Yamilé Martínez	20.5
2000	(Australia) Andrew Gaze	19.9	(Brazil) Janeth Arcain	20.5
2004	(Spain) Pau Gasol	22.4	(Australia) Lauren Jackson	22.9
2008	(Spain) Pau Gasol	19.6	(China) Miao Lijie	17.3
2012	(Australia) Patty Mills	21.2	(Brazil) Érika de Souza	16.2
2016	(Croatia) Bojan Bogdanović	25.3	(Australia) Elizabeth Cambage	23.5
2020	(Australia) Patty Mills	26.8	(Belgium) Emma Meesseman	27.3
2024	(Greece) Giannis Antetokounmpo	25.8	(Belgium) Emma Meesseman	23.2
2028				

== See also ==
- 3x3 basketball at the Summer Olympics
- Basketball at the Asian Games
- Basketball at the African Games
- Basketball at the Commonwealth Games
- Basketball at the Youth Olympic Games
- Basketball at the Pacific Games
- Basketball at the Pan American Games
- Wheelchair basketball at the Summer Paralympics
