= Tiscareño =

Tiscareño is a surname. Notable people with the surname include:

- Carlos Tiscareño (born 1974), Mexican politician
- Fernando Tiscareño (born 1965), Mexican former basketball
