= Ivica Milankov =

Serbian politician (born 1977)

Ivica Milankov (Serbian Cyrillic: Ивица Миланков; born 1977) is a Serbian politician. He was a member of the Vojvodina provincial assembly from 2016 to 2020 and is now a member of the Novi Bečej municipal assembly. For many years a prominent local politician in the far-right Serbian Radical Party (SRS), Milankov left the Radicals to join the Movement of Socialists (PS) in early 2020.

== Private career ==
Milankov is from the village of Novo Miloševo in Novi Bečej. He is a graduated economist.

== Politician ==
=== Serbian Radical Party ===
Milankov appeared in the tenth position on the Radical Party's electoral list for the Novi Bečej municipal assembly in the 2008 Serbian local elections. Radicals won nine seats in the municipality, finishing second against the Liberal Democratic Party (LDP). Milankov was given an assembly mandate and served as a member of the opposition. (For the 2008 local elections, all mandates were assigned to candidates on successful lists at the discretion of the sponsoring parties or coalitions. Milankov's specific list position had no formal bearing on his chances of election.)

The Radical Party experienced a serious split in late 2008, with several members joining the more moderate Serbian Progressive Party (SNS) led by Tomislav Nikolić and Aleksandar Vučić. Milankov remained with the Radicals and became the leader of the party's municipal board in Novi Bečej.

Serbia's electoral system was reformed in 2011, such that all mandates were assigned to candidates on successful lists in numerical order. Milankov was given the lead position on the Radical Party's list for Novi Bečej in the 2012 local elections and was re-elected when the list won two mandates. He also appeared on the party's lists for the 2012 Serbian parliamentary election and the 2012 Vojvodina provincial election, both of which were held concurrently with the municipal vote. In the parliamentary contest, he was given the 124th position on the SRS list, which did not cross the electoral threshold for assembly representation. In the provincial vote, he appeared in the twenty-third position and was not elected when the list won five seats.

Milankov later received the 160th position on the Radical Party's list in the 2014 parliamentary election. As in 2012, the party failed to cross the threshold.

==== Provincial representative ====
Milankov was given the seventh position on the SRS's list in the 2016 Vojvodina election and was this time elected to the provincial assembly when the list won ten seats. The Progressive Party and its allies won the election, and Milankov served for the next four years as a member of the opposition.

He also appeared in the lead position on the Radical Party's list for Novi Bečej in the 2016 local elections and was re-elected when the list won three seats. During this time, he was president of the SRS's organization for the Central Banat District.

A number of prominent SRS officials in Vojvodina, including Milankov, resigned from the party in February 2020.

=== Movement of Socialists ===
Milankov joined the Movement of Socialists soon after leaving the Radical Party. Although the parties are at different ends of the ideological spectrum, they are mostly aligned on matters of international diplomacy, including in their support of increased ties with Russia.

The PS is generally aligned with the Progressive Party, and in the 2020 local elections it was part of a SNS-led coalition in Novi Bečej. Milankov received the fourth position on the coalition's list and was re-elected to the municipal assembly when it won twenty-one seats. He was not a candidate for re-election at the provincial level.

For the 2024 local elections, the Movement of Socialists fielded its own list in Novi Bečej. Milankov appeared in the lead position and was elected to a fifth term when the list won six mandates. The SNS won the election and afterward formed a coalition government that included the PS.
