= Moulay Ahmed =

Moulay Ahmed may refer to:

== People ==
- Moulay Ahmed Riadh, Moroccan basketball player
- Moulay Ahmed Alaoui, Moroccan politician
- Ahmed Ait Moulay, Moroccan alpine skier
- Ahmed Moulay Laraki, Moroccan politician
- Mulai Ahmed er Raisuni, Moroccan Sharif
- Abu'l Abbas Ahmad of Morocco, Sultan of Morocco

== Other ==
- Moulay Ahmed Cherif, town in Morocco
- "Moulay Ahmed", traditional Moroccan song by Hamid El Kasri
