= Sène =

Sène (many variations: Sene, Seen, pronounced Sene, or long: Seen) is a Serer patronym in Senegal.

People with this surname include:

- Adama François Sene (born 1989) Senegalese footballer
- Alioune Sene (born 1996) Senegalese-French pole vaulter
- Amy Sène (born 1986) French-Senegalese hammer thrower
- Badara Sène (footballer) (born 1984), Senegalese footballer
- Badara Sène (referee) (1945–2020), Senegalese football referee
- Cory Sene (born 2001), Senegalese footballer
- Fama Diagne Sène (born 1969), Senegalese writer
- Fatou Sene (born 1989), Senegalese footballer
- Karim Sène (born 1971), Senegalese former pole vaulter
- Madjiguene Sene (born 1994), Senegalese basketball player
- Mamadou Sène (born 1960), Senegalese former sprinter
- Mamadou Kaly Sène (born 2001), Senegalese footballer
- Matar Sène (born 1970), Senegalese freestyle wrestler
- Moussa Sène (born 1946), Senegalese basketball player
- Moussa Sene Absa (born 1958), Senegalese filmmaker
- Mouhamed Sene (born 1986), Senegalese basketball player
- Ndéye Séne (born 1988), Senegalese basketball player
- Ndiole Sène (born 2003), Senegalese handball player
- Oumar Sène (born 1959), Senegalese former football midfielder
- Papa Daouda Sène (born 1976), Senegalese former footballer
- Pierre Sène (born 1964), Senegalese judoka
- Saër Sène (born 1986), French footballer of Senegalese descent
- Yandé Codou Sène (1932–2010), Senegalese singer
