= José Manuel Correa Ceseña =

Mexican politician (born 1947)

- Born: 2 September 1947 (age 78); San José del Cabo, Baja California Sur, Mexico
- Occupation: Politician
- Political party: PRI

José Manuel Correa Ceseña (born 2 September 1947) is a Mexican politician from the Institutional Revolutionary Party (PRI). He has served two terms as a federal deputy: from 1991 to 1994 (55th Congress), for Jalisco's 14th district; and from 2000 to 2003 (58th Congress), as a plurinominal deputy.

He was also a local deputy in the 55th session of the Congress of Jalisco.
