= 14th federal electoral district of Jalisco =

Federal electoral district of Mexico

Jalisco's 14th
- Electoral district of the Chamber of Deputies of Mexico

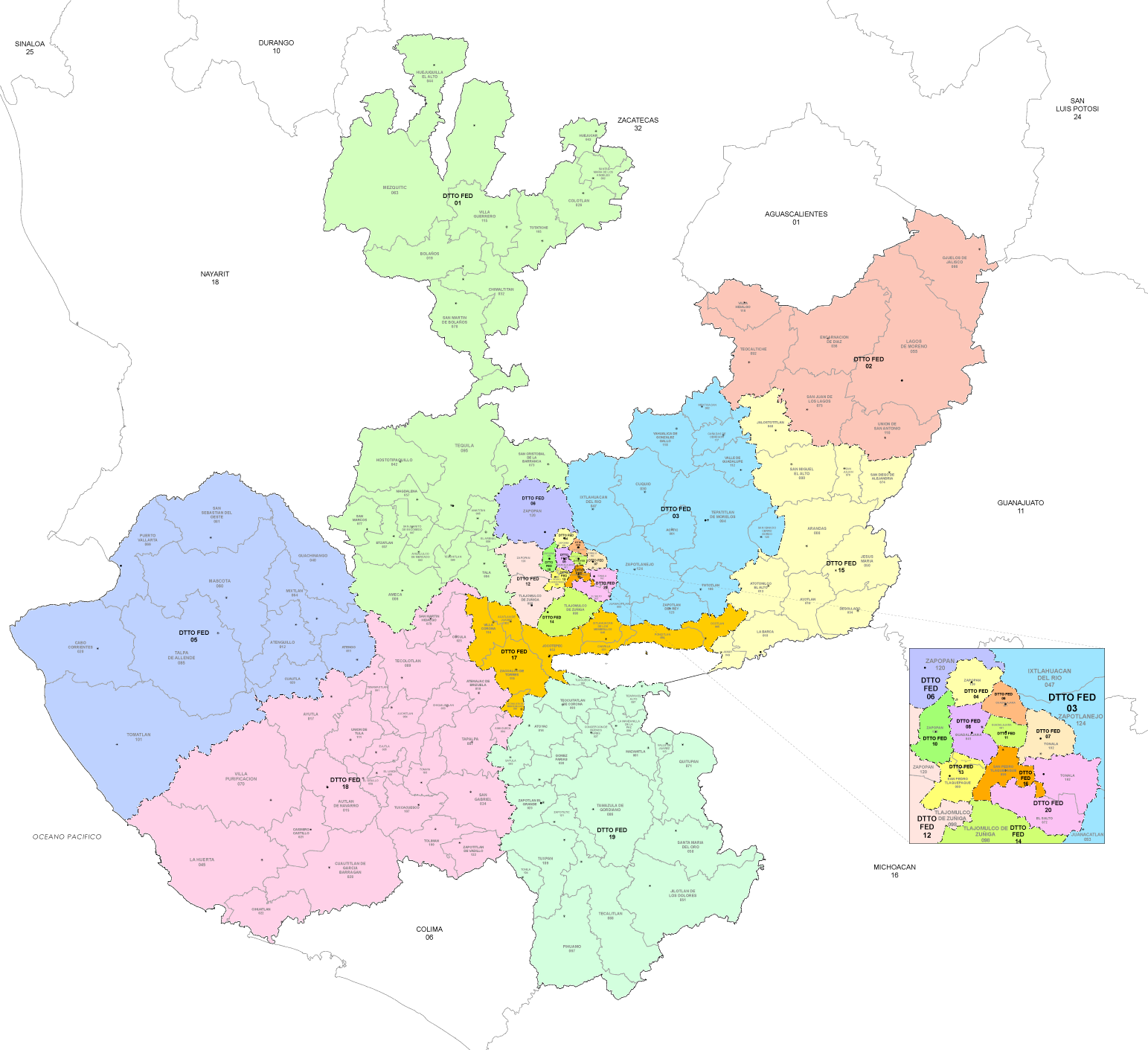
- 14th district

Incumbent
- Member: Marcela Michel López]
- Party: ▌Morena
- Congress: 66th (2024–2027)

District
- State: Jalisco
- Head town: Tlajomulco de Zúñiga
- Coordinates: 20°28′N 103°26′W
- Covers: Municipality of Tlajomulco de Zúñiga (part)
- PR region: First
- Precincts: 80
- Population: 440,447 (2020 census)

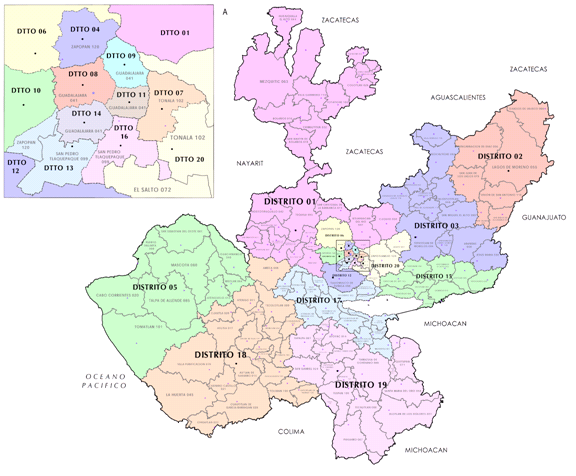
Jalisco's districts in 2017–2022

The 14th federal electoral district of Jalisco (Spanish: Distrito electoral federal 14 de Jalisco) is one of the 300 electoral districts into which Mexico is divided for elections to the federal Chamber of Deputies and one of 20 such districts in the state of Jalisco.

It elects one deputy to the lower house of Congress for each three-year legislative session by means of the first-past-the-post system. Votes cast in the district also count towards the calculation of proportional representation ("plurinominal") deputies elected from the first region.

Suspended in 1930, (Note: An amendment to Article 52 of the Constitution in 1928 changed the original provision of "one deputy per 60,000 inhabitants" to "one deputy per 100,000"; as a result, the size of the Chamber of Deputies fell from 281 in the 1928 election to 171 in 1934.) the 14th district was re-established as part of the 1977 electoral reforms. The restored district returned its first deputy in the 1979 mid-term election.

The current member for the district, elected in the 2024 general election, is Marcela Michel López of the National Regeneration Movement (Morena).

== District territory ==
Under the 2023 districting plan adopted by the National Electoral Institute (INE), which is to be used for the 2024, 2027 and 2030 federal elections, Jalisco's 14th district is located in the Guadalajara Metropolitan Area and comprises 80 electoral precincts (secciones electorales) in the municipality of Tlajomulco de Zúñiga. (Note: The rest of Tlajomulco (75 precincts) is assigned to the 12th district.)

The head town (cabecera distrital), where results from individual polling stations are gathered together and tallied, is the municipal seat, the city of Tlajomulco de Zúñiga. The district reported a population of 440,447 in the 2020 census.

== Previous districting schemes ==
Evolution of electoral district numbers
| | 1974 | 1978 | 1996 | 2005 | 2017 | 2023 |
|---|---|---|---|---|---|---|
| Jalisco | 13 | 20 | 19 | 19 | 20 | 20 |
| Chamber of Deputies | 196 | 300 | | | | |

2017–2022

Jalisco regained its 20th congressional seat in the 2017 redistricting process. The 14th district covered 226 precincts in the south-west of the municipality of Guadalajara.

2005–2017

Under the 2005 plan, Jalisco had 19 districts. This district covered 167 precincts in the south-west of the municipality of Guadalajara.

1996–2005

In the 1996 scheme, under which Jalisco lost a single-member seat, the district comprised 149 precincts in the south of the municipality of Guadalajara.

1978–1996

The districting scheme in force from 1978 to 1996 was the result of the 1977 electoral reforms, which increased the number of single-member seats in the Chamber of Deputies from 196 to 300. Under that plan, Jalisco's seat allocation rose from 13 to 20. The restored 14th district's head town was at Guadalajara and it covered a portion of the city's sector Hidalgo.

== Deputies returned to Congress ==
(Mexico) National parties
- Current
- PAN
- PRI
- PT
- PVEM
- MC
- Morena
- PAZ
- Somos
- Defunct or local only
- PLM
- PNR
- PRM
- PNM
- PP
- PPS
- PARM
- PFCRN
- CON
- PANAL
- PSD
- PES
- PES
- PRD

Jalisco's 14th district
| Election | Deputy | Party | Term | Legislature |
|---|---|---|---|---|
| 1916 | Francisco Labastida Izquierdo | | 1916–1917 | Constituent Congress of Querétaro |
...
The 14th district was suspended between 1930 and 1979
| 1979 | Francisco Rodríguez Gómez | Institutional Revolutionary Party | 1979–1982 | 51st Congress |
| 1982 | José Luis Martínez Rodríguez | Institutional Revolutionary Party | 1982–1985 | 52nd Congress |
| 1985 | Arnulfo Javier Villaseñor Saavedra | Institutional Revolutionary Party | 1985–1988 | 53rd Congress |
| 1988 | José Manuel Martínez Aguirre | National Action Party (Mexico) | 1988–1991 | 54th Congress |
| 1991 | José Manuel Correa Ceseña | Institutional Revolutionary Party | 1991–1994 | 55th Congress |
| 1994 | Alejandro Villaseñor Tatay | National Action Party (Mexico) | 1994–1997 | 56th Congress |
| 1997 | Nicolás Jiménez Carrillo | National Action Party (Mexico) | 1997–2000 | 57th Congress |
| 2000 | Rodrigo David Mireles Pérez | National Action Party (Mexico) | 2000–2003 | 58th Congress |
| 2003 | Carlos Noel Tiscareño Rodríguez | National Action Party (Mexico) | 2003–2006 | 59th Congress |
| 2006 | José Gildardo Guerrero Torres | National Action Party (Mexico) | 2006–2009 | 60th Congress |
| 2009 | César Octavio Madrigal Díaz | National Action Party (Mexico) | 2009–2012 | 61st Congress |
| 2012 | Enrique Aubry de Castro Palomino | Ecologist Green Party of Mexico | 2012–2015 | 62nd Congress |
| 2015 | Víctor Manuel Sánchez Orozco | Citizens' Movement (Mexico) | 2015–2018 | 63rd Congress |
| 2018 | Juan Francisco Ramírez Salcido | Citizens' Movement (Mexico) | 2018–2021 | 64th Congress |
| 2021 | María Leticia Chávez Pérez | Citizens' Movement (Mexico) | 2021–2024 | 65th Congress |
| 2024 | Marcela Michel López | National Regeneration Movement | 2024–2027 | 66th Congress |

== Presidential elections ==
Jalisco's 14th district
| Election | District won by | Party or coalition | % |
|---|---|---|---|
| 2018 | Andrés Manuel López Obrador | Juntos Haremos Historia | 43.8577 |
| 2024 | Claudia Sheinbaum Pardo | Sigamos Haciendo Historia | 57.5023 |
