= César Octavio Madrigal Díaz =

Mexican politician (born 1974)

- Born: 30 January 1974 (age 52); Guadalajara, Jalisco, Mexico
- Occupation: Politician
- Political party: PAN

César Octavio Madrigal Díaz (born 30 January 1974) is a Mexican politician from the National Action Party (PAN). In the 2009 mid-terms he was elected to the Chamber of Deputies to represent Jalisco's 14th district during the 61st session of Congress.
