= Enrique Aubry =

Mexican politician (born 1982)

- Born: Enrique Aubry de Castro Palomino; 19 June 1982 (age 43); Federal District, Mexico
- Occupation: Politician
- Political party: PVEM
- Children: 3
- Family: Eduardo Aubry de Castro palomino, Cristina Aubry de Castro Palomino

Enrique Aubry de Castro Palomino (born 19 June 1982) is a Mexican politician affiliated with the Ecologist Green Party of Mexico (PVEM). In the 2012 general election, he was elected to the Chamber of Deputies to represent Jalisco's 14th district during the 62nd session of Congress.
