= Armando Rodríguez (journalist) =

Mexican crime journalist and murder victim

- José Armando Rodríguez Carreón
- Born: c. 1968
- Died: 13 November 2008; Ciudad Juárez, Chihuahua, Mexico
- Cause of death: Murder by gunfire
- Other names: "El Choco"
- Citizenship: Mexican
- Occupation: Journalist (crime beat)
- Years active: 14
- Employer: El Diario de Ciudad Juárez
- Known for: his reporting on the Juárez murders and bringing international attention to violence in the city
- Spouse: Blanca Martínez
- Children: Ximena Rodríguez and son

Armando Rodríguez, born José Armando Rodríguez Carreón and also known as "El Choco", (c. 1968 – 13 November 2008), was a Mexican journalist who covered the crime beat for El Diario de Juárez in Ciudad Juárez, Chihuahua, Mexico and was murdered at his residence. He was known for his investigative journalism and reporting on crime, including the Juárez murders, and his death was acknowledged by the Board of the Investigative Reporters & Editors in an official statement that condemned his murder.

== Personal life ==
Rodríguez lived in Juarez with his wife Blanca Martínez and their children, including daughter Ximena Rodriguez, who was a witness to her father's murder, and a son. His wife is also a journalist and they met while they were both working at a local TV station.

== Career ==
Rodríguez worked as crime journalist for 14 years and was on staff at El Diario, a daily newspaper in Juarez. He covered many stories on the Mexican drug war and other gang related violence in his city. He had also worked in TV and in print.

== Death ==
Ciudad Juárez, Mexico

Rodríguez was in a company car at his residence around 8 a.m. on 13 November 2008 and was warming his car before taking his daughter and son to school when he was shot between eight and ten times at close range with a 9 mm weapon. Although his daughter Ximena was in the vehicle and witnessed her father's murder, she was uninjured. His son was still in the house at that time.

== Context ==
One of Rodríguez's last stories linked the nephew of Prosecutor Patricia González with organized crime. However, he had been receiving threats earlier and had reported them to his employer and to press rights organization. For two months, he had been assigned to cover El Paso, Texas by El Diario as a means to protect him. Rodríguez told the Committee to Protect Journalists (CPJ) that he had been receiving threats in text messages shortly before his death and was even offered police protection.

"The risks here are high and rising, and journalists are easy targets, but I can’t live in my house like a prisoner. I refuse to live in fear. -Rodríguez in his report to CPJ

The Attorney General of the Republic at the federal level appointed a special investigator to his case. However, the investigator in the case was killed in July 2009 and the next appointed investigator in the same case was also killed shortly afterward.

In 2010, Mexican President Felipe Calderón Hinojosa announced progress in the case as federal investigators had a confession of a man who had been the alleged driver of the gunman and an arrest was made, but El Diario published a story about how the confession was extracted through torture. Furthermore, the newspaper said no arrest had been made two years after the murder. Another casualty from the newspaper was photojournalist Luis Carlos Santiago Orozco, who was killed on September 16, 2010.

== Impact ==
At the time of Rodríguez's murder, violence in Mexico was spreading across multiple sectors, with threats to educators and press becoming more common. Even though President Calderón waged a war against drug cartels, violence in the streets of Ciudad Juárez and throughout Mexico continued. Over 28,000 people died between 2006 and 2010 as a result of cartel-related violence. Calderón said the violence from the cartels shows they are becoming desperate.

The result though is that many Mexican newspapers and journalists have been intimidated into not reporting about crime, corruption and drug cartel violence and some have chosen exile. Jorge Luis Aguirre was driving home from Rodríguez's when he received a threatening call that told him that he was next, and he chose exile in the United States. Another journalist from the newspaper, Emilio Gutiérrez, also chose exile across the border. Rodríguez's colleague Luz Sosa wrote the story about his murder for the El Diario, and the BBC created a documentary about her continued effort to report on crime in Juárez.

== Reactions ==
Jesús Meza, president of the local Association of Journalists in Ciudad Juarez, said, "He was a prominent journalist. He was known. So he was killed as a symbol. He was killed to create panic and paranoia. This is a technique of terrorism. They want everyone to be afraid, because that will destabilize the society."

Koïchiro Matsuura, director-general of UNESCO, said, "I condemn the murder of Armando Rodríguez. The cold-blooded slaying of veteran crime reporter Armando Rodríguez highlights the long-recognized link between freedom of expression and rule of law. The ruthless criminal campaign being waged against the media in Mexico must be brought to an end. I trust that the authorities will spare no effort in investigating the killing of Armando Rodríguez and bring the culprits to justice."

Senator Shapleigh, who as a state senator in Texas represents El Paso, Texas, which is the sister city of Ciudad Juárez, said, "His murder is a brutal reminder of the increasing violence that has gripped our sister city and of the great courage it takes for media members like Rodriguez to cover this escalating war."

A spokesperson for the Committee to Protect Journalists, Carlos Lauria, said, "Mexico needs to break the cycle of impunity in crimes against journalists."

== See also ==
- Mexican drug war
- List of journalists killed in Mexico
