= Ranko Žeravica =

Serbian basketball coach

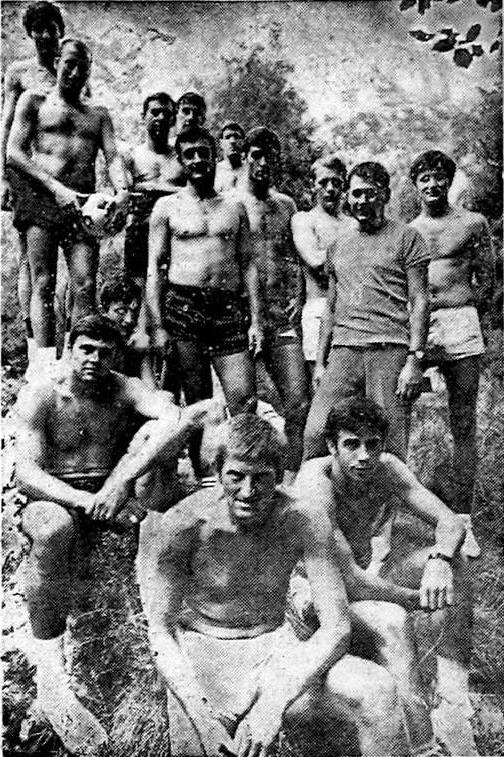
- Žeravica, standing second from the right, with his Yugoslavia national team's roster for the 1968 Olympics.

Personal information
- Born: 17 November 1929 Dragutinovo, Danube Banovina, Kingdom of Yugoslavia
- Died: 29 October 2015 (aged 85) Belgrade, Serbia
- Coaching career: 1954–2003

Career history

Coaching
- 1954–1960: Radnički Belgrade
- 1960–1965: Yugoslavia (assistant)
- 1965–1972: Yugoslavia
- 1971–1974: Partizan
- 1974–1976: FC Barcelona
- 1976–1978: Partizan
- 1978–1980: Pula
- 1980: Yugoslavia
- 1980–1986: Crvena Zvezda
- 1982: Yugoslavia
- 1987–1989: CAI Zaragoza
- 1989–1990: Irge Desio
- 1990: Filodoro Napoli
- 1991: Conservas Daroca
- 1991: Slobodna Dalmacija Split
- 1993–1994: Onyx Juvecaserta
- 1995–1996: Partizan
- 1996–1997: Crvena Zvezda
- 2003: CAI Zaragoza

Career highlights
- As head coach: FIBA Korać Cup champion (1978); Yugoslav League champion (1996); Piva Ivković Award for Lifetime Achievement (1995)
- FIBA Hall of Fame
Medals
Men's basketball
Head Coach for Yugoslavia
Summer Olympic Games
Gold medal – first place	1980 Moscow
Silver medal – second place	1968 Mexico City
FIBA World Cup
Gold medal – first place	1970 Ljubljana
Silver medal – second place	1967 Uruguay
Bronze medal – third place	1982 Colombia
FIBA EuroBasket
Silver medal – second place	1971 West Germany
Silver medal – second place	1969 Italy

Ranko Žeravica (Serbian Cyrillic: Ранко Жеравица; 17 November 1929 – 29 October 2015) was a Serbian professional basketball coach. With a career that spanned over 50 years, he is most noted for his work with the senior Yugoslav national team, during the 1960s, 1970s, and early 1980s. In particular, Žeravica's single biggest achievement was guiding the country to its first ever major competition win — a gold medal on home soil, at the 1970 FIBA World Championship — leading to a huge expansion of the game of basketball throughout Yugoslavia.

In 2007, he was enshrined into the FIBA Hall of Fame. Ranko Žeravica Sports Hall was named after him in his honor, in 2016.

== Early life ==
Born to father Milorad, and mother Gordana, in the village of Dragutinovo (before it merged with Beodra into Novo Miloševo), Žeravica's education started in his village and continued in Kikinda, where he traveled every day by train. His family stemmed from Herzegovina by ancestry, having moved several generations before his birth to the Mošorin area, where they became wealthy farmers and land owners.

== Coaching career ==
=== Club coaching career ===
After he ended his basketball playing career, Žeravica worked as the head coach of various clubs throughout his career. He won the FIBA Korać Cup championship in 1978, and the Yugoslav League championship in 1996.

=== Yugoslavia national basketball team ===
Žeravica was the head coach of the senior men's Yugoslavia national basketball team to gold medals at the 1980 Summer Olympic Games and 1970 FIBA World Championship; as well as to silver medals at the 1968 Summer Olympic Games, 1967 FIBA World Championship, 1969 EuroBasket, and 1971 EuroBasket. He also coached Yugoslavia to the bronze medal at the 1982 FIBA World Championship.

He was also the head coach of Yugoslavia at the 1972 Summer Olympic Games and the 1967 EuroBasket.

- 1967–72 (Socialist Federal Republic of Yugoslavia) Yugoslavia
- ......1980 (Socialist Federal Republic of Yugoslavia) Yugoslavia
- ......1980 Argentina (technical adviser)
- ......1982 (Socialist Federal Republic of Yugoslavia) Yugoslavia

== Health problems and death ==
Ranko Žeravica had a history of cardiac problems. In 2009, he suffered a heart attack and had a triple bypass surgery. In early 2015, he was admitted to hospital due to chest pain and was diagnosed with a mild heart attack. He had a coronary stent surgery and was soon discharged from hospital.

Žeravica died on 29 October 2015, aged 85, at his Belgrade home.

== In popular culture ==
- In the 2015 Serbian sports drama We Will Be the World Champions, Žeravica was portrayed by Sergej Trifunović.

== See also ==
- FIBA Basketball World Cup winning head coaches
- Ranko Žeravica Sports Hall
- We Will Be the World Champions
