= Gildardo Guerrero Torres =

Mexican politician (born 1975)

- Born: 8 May 1975 (age 51); Jalisco, Mexico
- Occupation: Politician
- Political party: PAN

José Gildardo Guerrero Torres (born 8 May 1975) is a Mexican politician affiliated with the National Action Party (PAN). In the 2006 general election, he was elected to the Chamber of Deputies to represent Jalisco's 14th district during the 60th session of Congress.
