= Emil Mikhaylov =

Bulgarian basketball player

Personal information
- Nationality: Bulgarian
- Born: 14 May 1943 (age 81); Sliven, Bulgaria

Sport
- Sport: Basketball

Emil Mikhaylov (Bulgarian: Емил Михайлов, born 14 May 1943) is a Bulgarian former basketball player. He competed in the men's tournament at the 1968 Summer Olympics.
