= Norris Webb =

Panamanian basketball player

Norris Webb (born 29 October 1945 in Panama City) is a Panamanian former basketball player who competed in the 1968 Summer Olympics.
