= Farouk Dioury =

Moroccan basketball player

Personal information
- Nationality: Moroccan
- Born: 27 January 1943 (age 82); Casablanca, Morocco

Sport
- Sport: Basketball

Farouk Dioury (born 27 January 1943) is a Moroccan basketball player. He competed in the men's tournament at the 1968 Summer Olympics.
