= Luis Sinclair =

Panamanian basketball player

Luis Sinclair (born 28 September 1947 in Panama City) is a Panamanian former basketball player who competed in the 1968 Summer Olympics.
