= Fathallah Bouazzaoui =

Moroccan basketball player (born 1942)

Personal information
- Nationality: Moroccan
- Born: 1942 (age 82–83); Rabat, Morocco

Sport
- Sport: Basketball

Fathallah Bouazzaoui (born 1942) is a Moroccan basketball player. He competed in the men's tournament at the 1968 Summer Olympics.
