= Miguel Montalvo =

Cuban basketball player

Personal information
- Born: 27 July 1943 (age 81); Camagüey, Cuba

Sport
- Sport: Basketball

Miguel Montalvo (born 27 July 1943) is a Cuban basketball player. He competed in the men's tournament at the 1968 Summer Olympics.
