= Mohammed Alaoui =

Moroccan basketball player (born 1944)

Personal information
- Nationality: Moroccan
- Born: 1 January 1944 (age 81); Fez, Morocco

Sport
- Sport: Basketball

Mohammed Alaoui (born 1 January 1944) is a Moroccan basketball player. He competed in the men's tournament at the 1968 Summer Olympics.
