= Pablo García (basketball player) =

Cuban basketball player

Pablo García (born 3 February 1946) is a Cuban former basketball player who competed in the 1968 Summer Olympics.
