= Moukhtar Sayed =

Moroccan basketball player

Personal information
- Nationality: Moroccan
- Born: 16 April 1942 (age 82); Rabat, Morocco

Sport
- Sport: Basketball

Moukhtar Sayed (born 16 April 1942) is a Moroccan basketball player. He competed in the men's tournament at the 1968 Summer Olympics.
