= Babacar Seck =

Senegalese basketball player

Personal information
- Nationality: Senegalese
- Born: 4 September 1944 (age 80); Dakar, Senegal

Sport
- Sport: Basketball

Babacar Seck (born 4 September 1944) is a Senegalese basketball player. He competed in the men's tournament at the 1968 Summer Olympics and the 1972 Summer Olympics.
