= Carlos del Pozo =

Cuban basketball player (1943–2018)

Personal information
- Born: 6 April 1943; Santiago de Cuba, Cuba
- Died: 28 April 2018 (aged 75)

Sport
- Sport: Basketball

Carlos del Pozo (6 April 1943 – 28 April 2018) was a Cuban basketball player. He competed in the men's tournament at the 1968 Summer Olympics.
