= Ramón Reyes (basketball) =

Panamanian basketball player (1937–2014)

Personal information
- Born: 8 October 1937 Panama City, Panama
- Died: 23 May 2014 (aged 76)

Sport
- Sport: Basketball

Ramón Reyes (8 October 1937 – 23 May 2014) was a Panamanian basketball player. He competed in the men's tournament at the 1968 Summer Olympics.
