= Moussa Narou N'Diaye =

Senegalese basketball player (1934–2021)

Personal information
- Nationality: Senegalese
- Born: 21 October 1934; Dakar, Senegal
- Died: 20 May 2021 (aged 86)

Sport
- Sport: Basketball

Moussa Narou N'Diaye (21 October 1934 – 20 May 2021) was a Senegalese basketball player. He competed in the men's tournament at the 1968 Summer Olympics. N'Diaye died on 20 May 2021, at the age of 86.
