= Calixto Malcom =

Panamanian basketball player (1947–2021)

Personal information
- Born: 15 February 1947 Panama City, Panama
- Died: 19 February 2021 (aged 74)

Sport
- Sport: Basketball

Calixto Malcom (15 February 1947 – 19 February 2021) was a Panamanian basketball player. He competed in the men's tournament at the 1968 Summer Olympics.
