= Khalil El-Yamani =

Moroccan basketball player

Personal information
- Nationality: Moroccan
- Born: 24 October 1943 (age 81); Rabat, Morocco

Sport
- Sport: Basketball

Khalil El-Yamani (born 24 October 1943) is a Moroccan basketball player. He competed in the men's tournament at the 1968 Summer Olympics.
