= Doudas Leydi Camara =

Senegalese basketball player (1947–2024)

Personal information
- Nationality: Senegalese
- Born: 23 July 1947; Dakar, Senegal, French West Africa
- Died: 18 July 2024 (aged 76)

Sport
- Sport: Basketball

Doudas Leydi Camara (23 July 1947 – 18 July 2024) was a Senegalese basketball player. He competed in the men's tournament at the 1968 Summer Olympics and the 1972 Summer Olympics.

Camara died on 18 July 2024, at the age of 76.
