= Boubacar Traoré (basketball) =

Senegalese basketball player

Personal information
- Nationality: Senegalese
- Born: 17 December 1946 (age 78); Dakar, Senegal

Sport
- Sport: Basketball

Boubacar Traoré (born 17 December 1946) is a Senegalese basketball player. He competed in the men's tournament at the 1968 Summer Olympics and the 1972 Summer Olympics.
