= Percibal Blades =

Panamanian basketball player

Percibal Blades (born 1 April 1943, in Panama City) is a Panamanian former basketball player who competed in the 1968 Summer Olympics.

With Panama, he participated in the 1967 Pan American Games, competed in the 1968 Summer Olympic Games, and in the 1970 FIBA Basketball World Cup.
