= Claude Sadio =

Senegalese basketball player

Personal information
- Nationality: Senegalese
- Born: 29 October 1943 (age 81); Dakar, Senegal

Sport
- Sport: Basketball

Claude Sadio (born 29 October 1943) is a Senegalese basketball player. He competed in the men's tournament at the 1968 Summer Olympics.
