= Abderraouf Laghrissi =

Moroccan basketball player

Personal information
- Nationality: Moroccan
- Born: 1945 (age 79–80); Rabat, Morocco

Sport
- Sport: Basketball

Abderraouf Laghrissi (born 1945) is a Moroccan basketball player. He competed in the men's tournament at the 1968 Summer Olympics.
