= Ernesto Agard =

Panamanian basketball player (1937–2025)

Ernesto Agard (6 July 1937 – 8 July 2025) was a Panamanian basketball player who competed in the 1968 Summer Olympics.

Agard died on 8 July 2025 in Panama, at the age of 88.
