= Francisco Córdova (basketball) =

Puerto Rican basketball player

Personal information
- Nationality: Puerto Rican
- Born: 14 March 1944 (age 82) Bayamón, Puerto Rico

Sport
- Sport: Basketball

Francisco Córdova (born 14 March 1944) is a Puerto Rican basketball player. He competed in the men's tournament at the 1968 Summer Olympics.
