= Pedro Rivas (basketball) =

Panamanian basketball player

Pedro Rivas (24 November 1945 – 23 June 2007) was a Panamanian basketball player who competed in the 1968 Summer Olympics. He was born in Colón, Panama.
