= Allal Bel Caid =

Moroccan basketball player

Personal information
- Nationality: Moroccan
- Born: 25 December 1939 (age 85); Marrakesh, Morocco

Sport
- Sport: Basketball

Allal Bel Caid (born 25 December 1939) is a Moroccan basketball player. He competed in the men's tournament at the 1968 Summer Olympics.
