= Dimitar Sakhanikov =

Bulgarian basketball player (1942–2026)

Personal information
- Nationality: Bulgarian
- Born: 16 September 1942 Plovdiv, Bulgaria
- Died: 18 July 2026 (aged 83)

Sport
- Sport: Basketball

Dimitar Sakhanikov (16 September 1942 – 18 July 2026) was a Bulgarian basketball player. He competed in the men's tournament at the 1968 Summer Olympics. Sakhanikov died on 18 July 2026, at the age of 83.
