= Carlos Tiscareño =

Mexican politician (born 1974)

- Born: 21 September 1974 (age 51); Guadalajara, Jalisco, Mexico
- Occupation: Politician
- Political party: PAN

Carlos Noel Tiscareño Rodríguez (born 21 September 1974) is a Mexican politician affiliated with the National Action Party (PAN). In the 2003 mid-terms he was elected to the Chamber of Deputies to represent Jalisco's 14th district during the 59th session of Congress.
