= Óscar Asiáin =

Mexican basketball player (1949–2017)

Personal information
- Born: 21 February 1949; Chihuahua, Mexico
- Died: 8 March 2017 (aged 68)

Sport
- Sport: Basketball

Óscar Asiáin (21 February 1949 – 8 March 2017) was a Mexican basketball player. He competed in the men's tournament at the 1968 Summer Olympics.

== Biography ==
Asiáin was born in Chihuahua, Mexico, in February 1949, and graduated from the Autonomous University of Chihuahua. As well as competing at the Olympics, he also competed at the 1967 Pan American Games and the 1975 Pan American Games.

Asiáin was a director of the Chihuahuan Institute of Sport, and he was inducted into the Chihuahuan Sports Hall of Fame in 2000.

He died in March 2017 from cancer, at the age of 68.
