= Noureddine Cherradi =

Moroccan basketball player

Personal information
- Nationality: Moroccan

Sport
- Sport: Basketball

Noureddine Cherradi is a Moroccan basketball player. He competed in the men's tournament at the 1968 Summer Olympics.
