= Keiko Namai =

Japanese basketball player

Personal information
- Nationality: Japanese
- Born: 9 December 1951 (age 73); Tochigi, Japan

Sport
- Sport: Basketball

Keiko Namai (生井 けい子, Namai Keiko; born 9 December 1951) is a Japanese basketball player. She competed in the women's tournament at the 1976 Summer Olympics.
