= Luis Carlos Santiago =

Mexican crime journalist and murder victim

- Born: Luis Carlos Santiago Orozco; 5 March 1989
- Died: 16 September 2010 (Age 21); Ciudad Juarez, Mexico
- Occupations: Photographer, el diario

Luis Carlos Santiago Orozco (Note: In this Spanish name, the first or paternal surname is Santiago and the second or maternal family name is Orozco.) (5 March 1989 – 16 September 2010), was a Mexican photographer working for the daily newspaper El Diario in Ciudad Juarez, Chihuahua, Mexico. He was an intern for El Diario and was about to be made a staff member at the time of his death. Santiago was the second El Diario journalist to be murdered in two years. His murder is considered to be part of the Mexican drug war, although authorities dispute this point, and also involves human rights work.

== Death ==
Santiago had started working for El Diario as an intern in May and was about to be hired. His colleague Carlos Manuel Sanchez Colunga, 18, had been an intern for several weeks and was also going to be hired. The two were using a car that belonged to lawyer and human rights activist Gustavo de la Rosa Hickerson, who lived in El Paso, Texas, United States. El Diario reported that Santiago and Sánchez had borrowed the car from de la Rosa's son, who was an editor at the paper, to attend a photography workshop at the Rio Grande mall in the border city of Ciudad Juárez.

The car they were in was hit from behind by another vehicle, from which their attackers opened fire on the journalists with rifles and pistols. The two were shot by unidentified gunmen. Santiago died at the scene of the 2:45 p.m. shooting. Sánchez was hospitalized with serious injuries.

Police were investigating whether Gustavo de la Rosa was the intended target, but the motive for the attack is unclear. The newspaper the two journalists had not received any threats and were trainees and were not working on any sensitive story.

== Context ==
Murder of Luis Carlos Santiago
- Location: Ciudad Juarez, Chihuahua, Mexico
- Date: 16 September 2010
- Deaths: 1
- Injuries: 1

In December 2006, Mexican President Felipe Calderon launched a strong crackdown on drug cartels across the country. As of January 2011, the Mexican government reported that 34,612 people have been killed in related violence. Deaths include members of drug cartels, security forces, police, journalists and innocent bystanders.

The worst of the violence tends to be concentrated in Mexico's northern border around Juarez in the state of Chihuahua, where 3,100 people died just in 2010. Gustavo de la Rosa Hickerson, a trained lawyer, worked for the Chihuahua State Human Rights Commission in Ciudad Juarez and in the area human rights in Mexico for 40 years until he was threatened and went into exile across the border in El Paso. According to an NPR report, de la Rosa is investigating the military's role in striking out at ordinary citizens caught in the middle and believes the military was behind the threats that targeted him.

In addition to the random acts of violence on its citizens, Mexico is one of the most dangerous countries in Latin America for press freedom and one of the deadliest places in the world for journalists. Luis Carlos Santiago Orozco was the second El Diario journalist to be murdered in two years, following the death of José Armando Rodríguez Carreón, 40, who was shot dead on 13 November 2008. Reporters Without Borders notes that 68 media workers have been killed since 2008 in Mexico and 11 declared missing since 2003. As of 2010, the worst of the violence against journalists also tended to be concentrated in Mexico's northern border. In particular, Chihuahua has seen a number of attacks. In 2010, 11 journalists were murdered in Mexico in the first nine months of the year.

As part of its efforts to ensure that journalists are able to work in safety, UNESCO is participating in a research project on the effects of stress on the mental health of Spanish-speaking journalists working in conflict zones. The project, run by the Sunnybrook Health Sciences Center in Toronto, Ontario, Canada, evaluates psychological damage (post-traumatic stress disorder, substance abuse, depression) incurred; it focuses on Mexico because of the severe risks journalists face in the country. Results will be announced at the end of the year

== Reactions ==
Santiago's death prompted a strong international reaction.

Irina Bokova, who is the director-general of UNESCO, said: “I condemn the attack that caused the death of Luis Carlos Santiago Orozco and seriously injured Carlos Manuel Sanchez Colunga. Journalists and media professionals have already paid too high a price in this region. The open letter calling for an end to the violence published on the front page of El Diario, the newspaper for which these two photographers worked, illustrates the extent of the problem. It is vital that journalists be allowed to work safely, without fearing for their lives, so that Mexican society may enjoy the basic right of freedom of expression.”

His murder was also condemned by Aidan White, who is the general secretary of the International Federation of Journalists: "Journalists are on the front line in the war between government and drug and crime cartels. Unless the government can provide adequate protection to journalists, there is no hope for an end to organised crime in the country."

Investigative Reporters & Editors released a statement that acknowledged El Diaro's continued role in reporting on crime when many newspapers have withheld information on account of concerns about safety. The statement said that Santiago was following in the tradition of Armando Rodríguez Carreón, who had been killed 13 November 2008, in Ciudad Juarez.

His death also prompted a heartfelt response, in Spanish, by a local comic book shop owner who had known Santiago from his time spent playing card games at the shop. The man says Santiago was a person who people looked up to, and his death was felt strongly amongst his circle of friends. Some friends even created a YouTube video memorial in his honor.

== The "Severed Head" Warning ==
The staff of El Diaro were at Santiago's funeral when they found out that a severed head was atop a car nearby. They went to investigate and found the head along with the editorial about Luis Carlos Santiago's death in El Diaro. The newspaper responded with a bold headline on the front page – "What do you want from us?"—and an editorial in response.

== Career ==
Santiago was a trainee photographer, hired in May 2010 as an intern, and was about to be hired as a full-time employee on 20 September. He wasn't on duty at the time of his death. Santiago also worked as a DJ every once in a while.

== Personal ==
Santiago lived with his girlfriend for the two years before his death. His father spoke at his funeral, but his brothers were too upset to speak.

During his free time, Santiago was an avid cosplayer, which is a subculture of people who don costumes to represent figures and characters. He also frequented the CD Vine World Store and B-162 where he played the card game "Myths and Legends." In a letter written after his death, a fellow card game player described the young man as "bulky-haired." "Luis Carlos was a very versatile person in many aspects. He was also a D.J. [and] he was cosplayer, was photographer [for] The Newspaper of Juárez, and he did many other things. He was a person that lived like (many would have) liked to live." – Cuauhtémoc Guerrero, Chagolion Comics. Translated from Spanish.

== See also ==
- Mexican drug war
- List of journalists killed in Mexico
