= Eliécer Ellis =

Panamanian basketball player (born 1945)

Eliécer Ellis (born 13 December 1945 in Santiago de Veraguas) is a Panamanian former basketball player who competed in the 1968 Summer Olympics.
