= Abdel Jabbar Bel Gnaoui =

Moroccan basketball player

Personal information
- Nationality: Moroccan
- Born: 1 March 1942; Rabat, Morocco
- Died: November 2016 (aged 74)

Sport
- Sport: Basketball

Abdel Jabbar Bel Gnaoui (1 March 1942 – November 2016) was a Moroccan basketball player. He competed in the men's tournament at the 1968 Summer Olympics.
