= Mansour Diagne =

Senegalese basketball player (1933–2026)

Personal information
- Nationality: Senegalese
- Born: 21 January 1933 Dakar, French Senegal, French West Africa
- Died: 25 February 2026 (aged 93)

Sport
- Sport: Basketball

Mansour Diagne (21 January 1933 – 25 February 2026) was a Senegalese basketball player. He competed in the men's tournament at the 1968 Summer Olympics. Diagne died on 25 February 2026, at the age of 93.
