= Francisco Checa =

Panamanian former basketball player

Francisco Checa (4 February 1940 – 13 April 2008) was a Panamanian basketball player who competed in the 1968 Summer Olympics. He was born and died in Panama City.
