= Novo Miloševo =

Novo Miloševo Ново Милошево (Serbian) Beodra (Hungarian)
- Village (Selo)
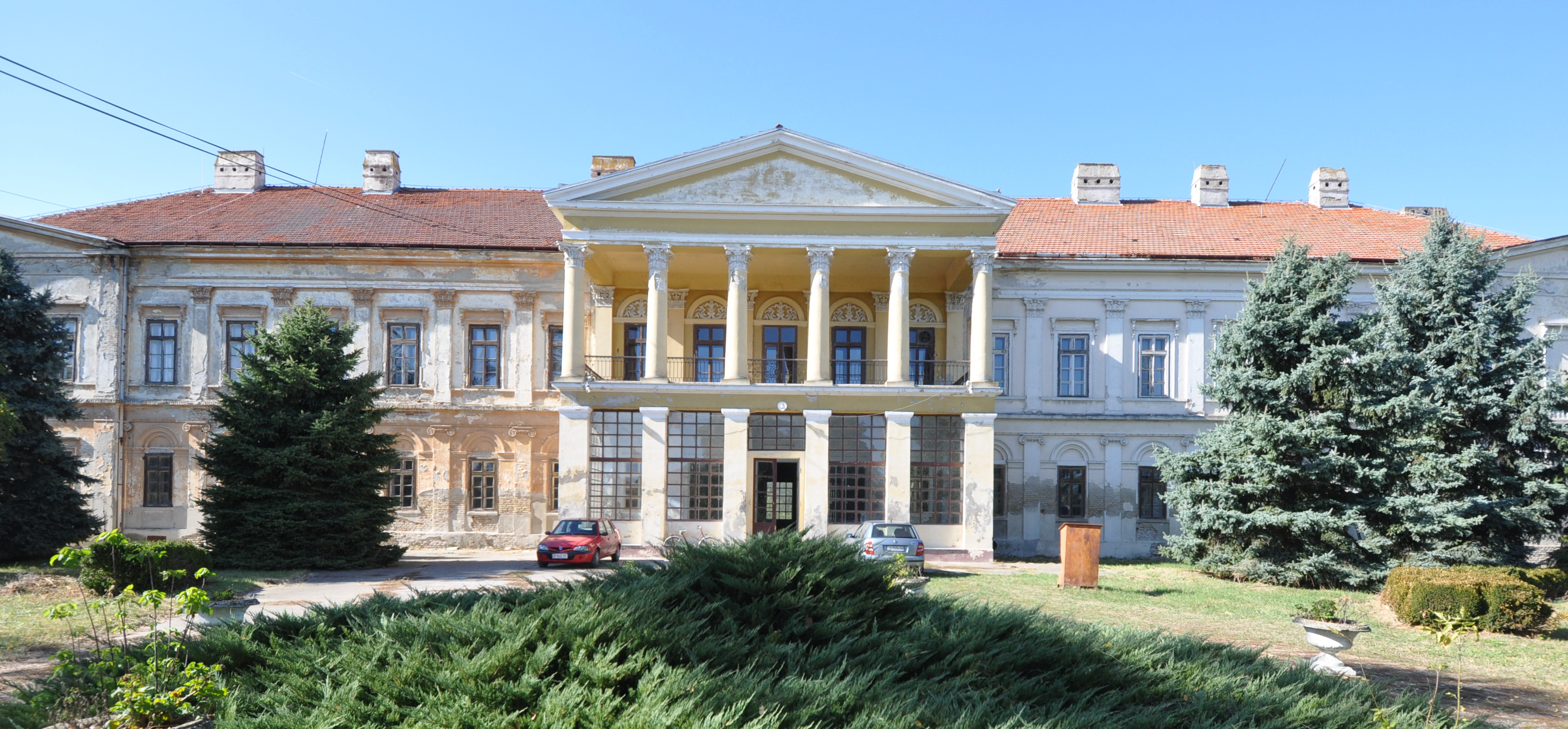
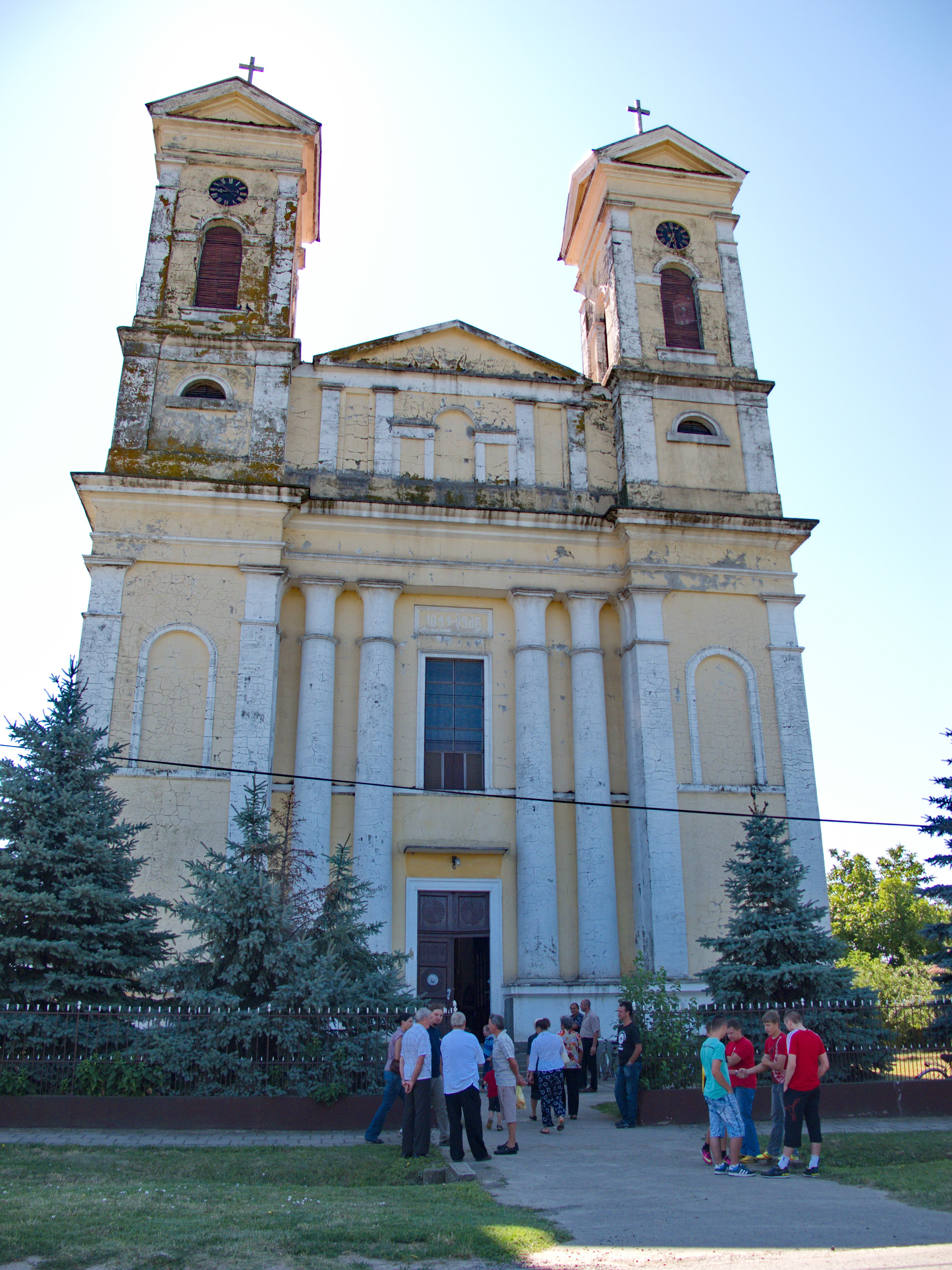
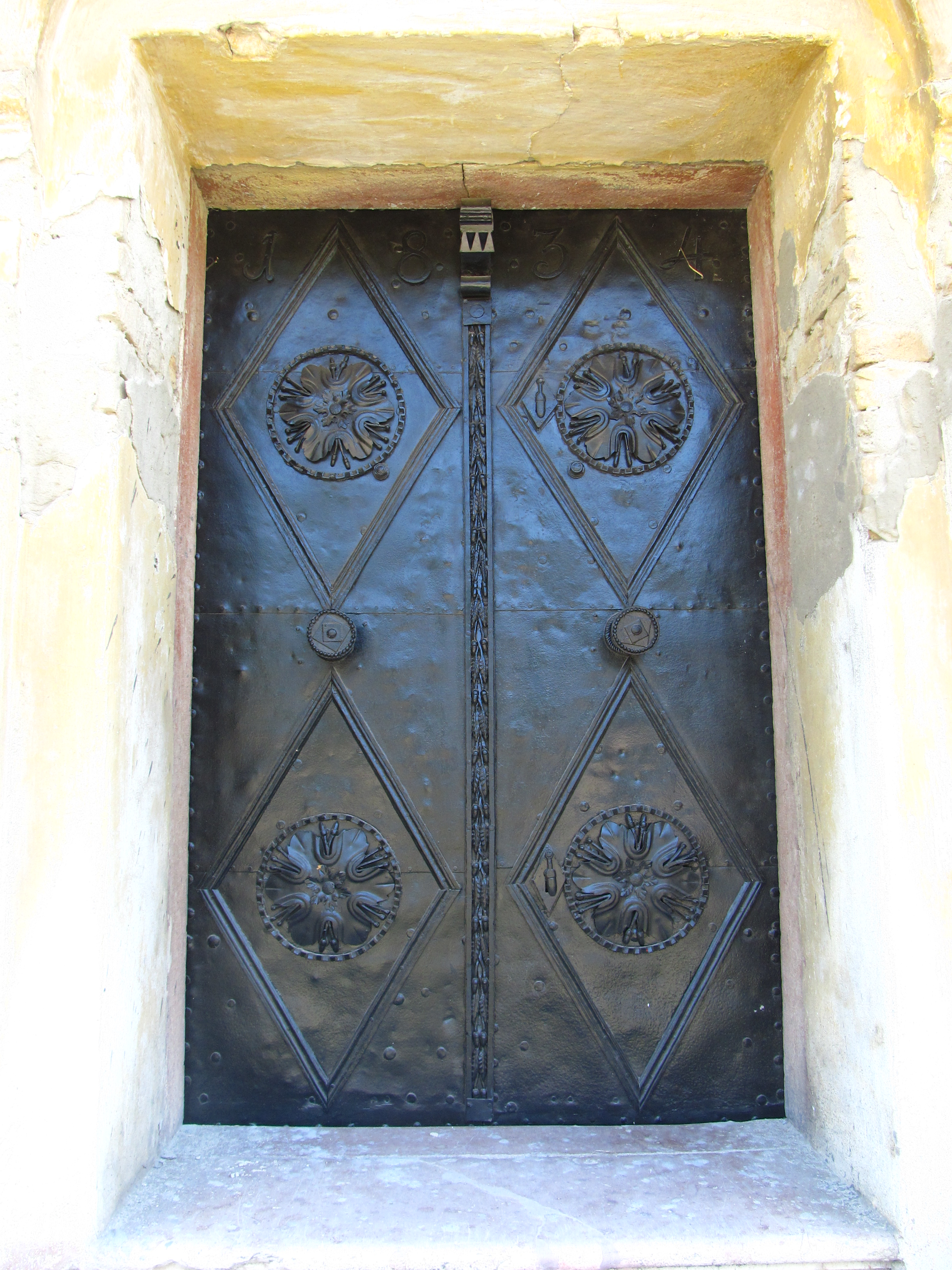
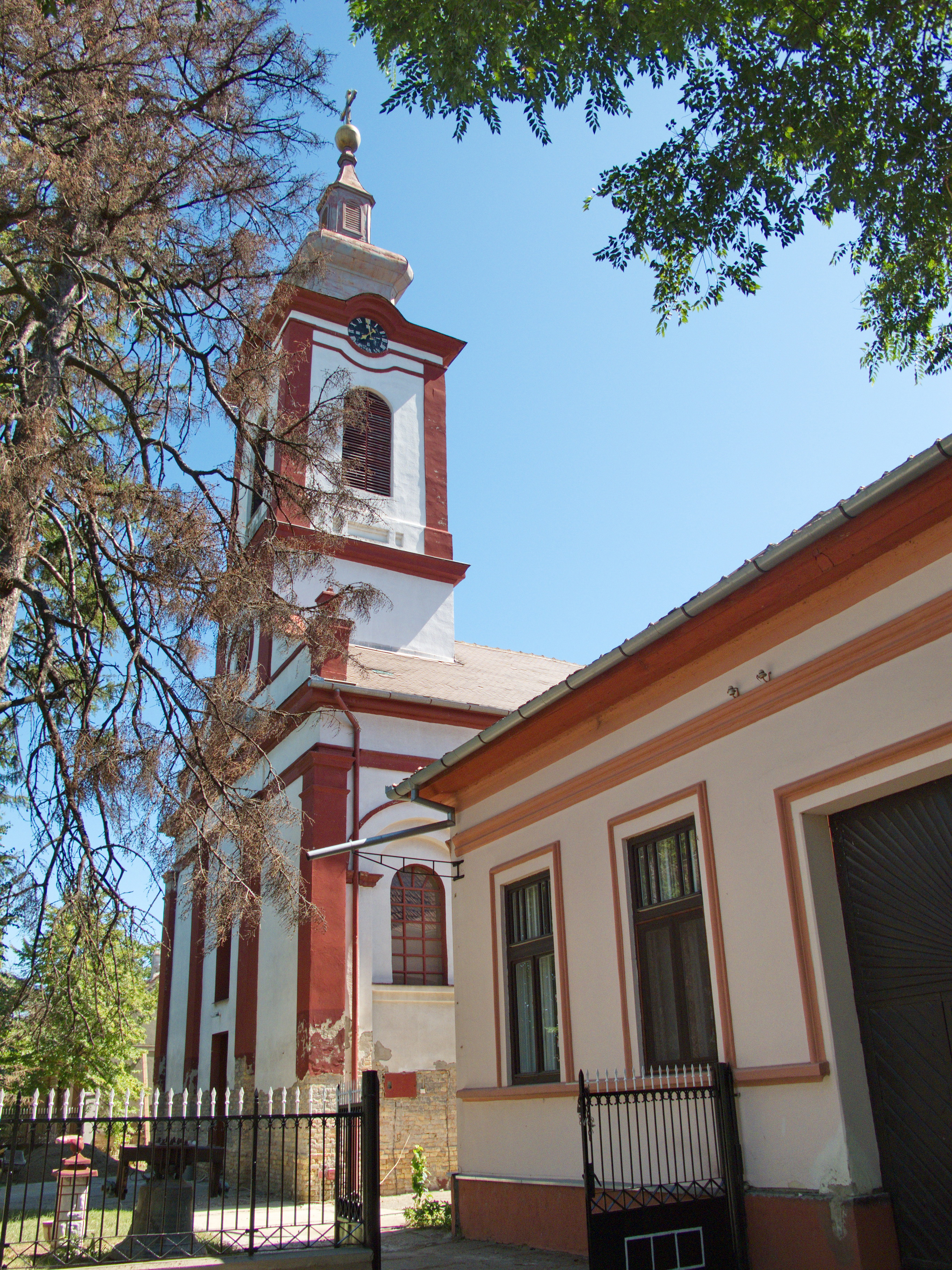
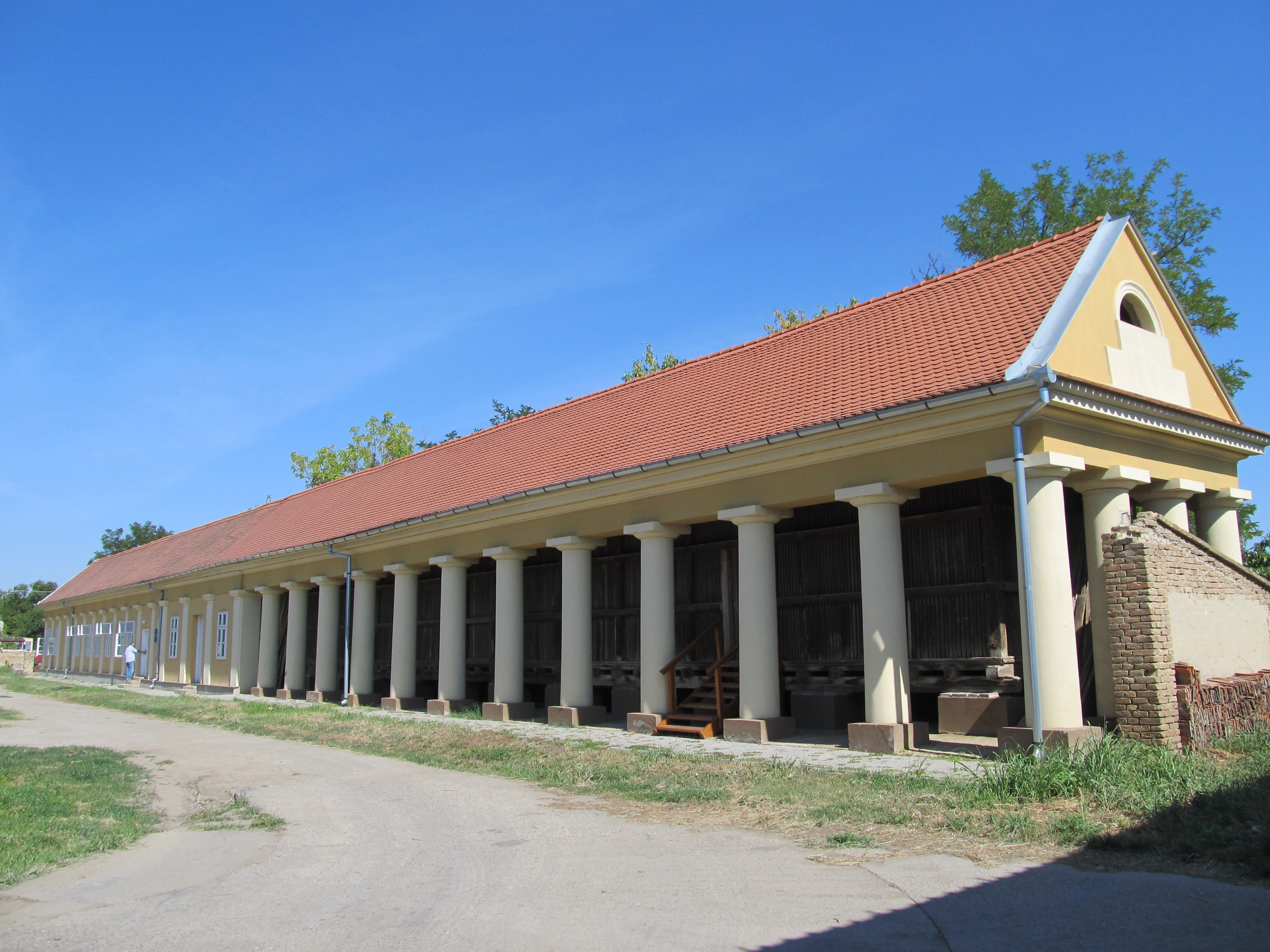
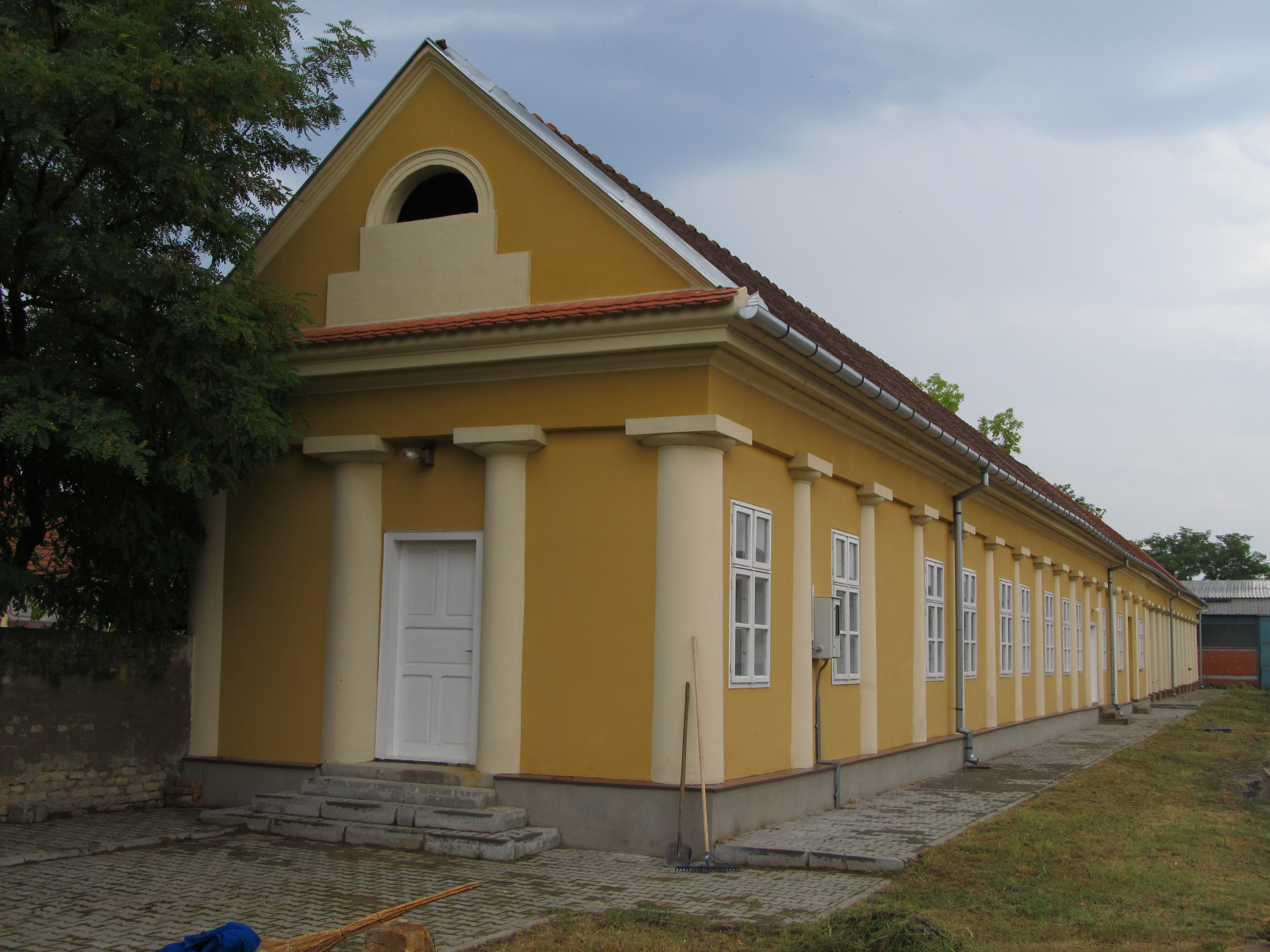
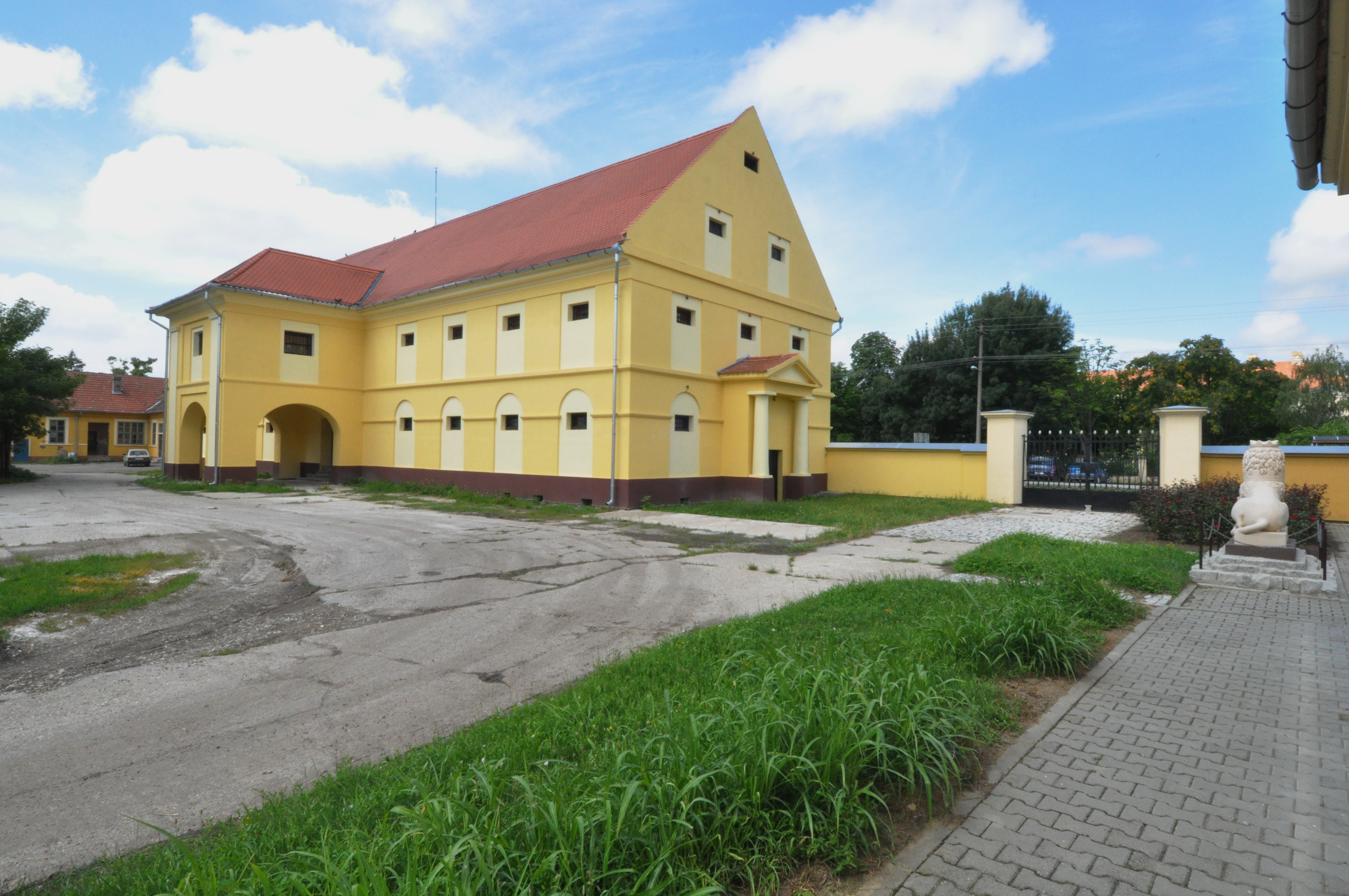
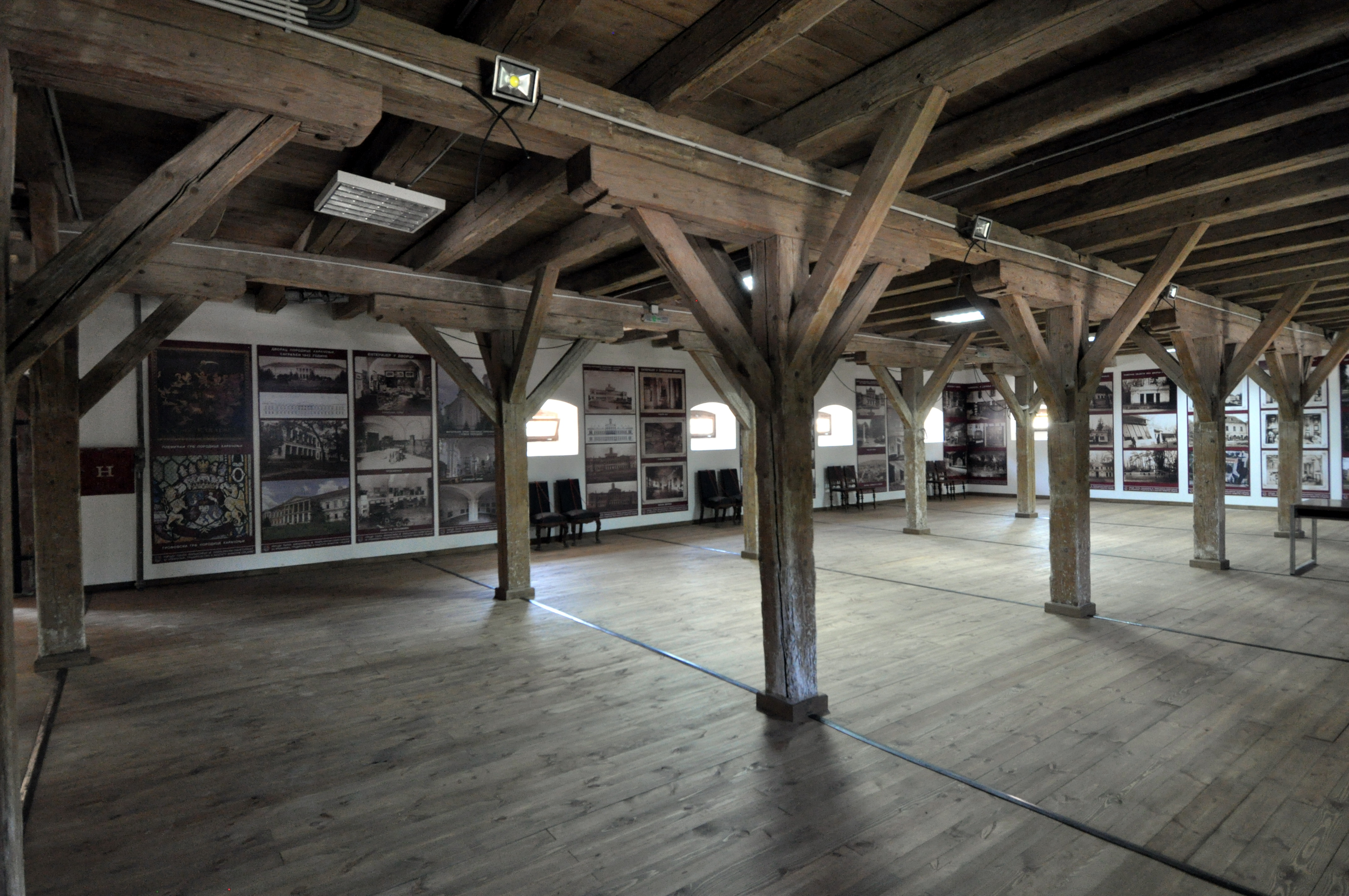
- Photos of Novo Miloševo

- Location of Novo Miloševo within Serbia Novo Miloševo (Serbia) Novo Miloševo (Europe)
- Coordinates: 45°43′11″N 20°18′07″E
- Country: Serbia
- Province: Vojvodina
- District: Central Banat
- Municipalities: Novi Bečej
- Elevation: 77 m (253 ft)

Population (2002)
  - Novo Miloševo: 6,763
- Time zone: UTC+1 (CET)
  - Summer (DST): UTC+2 (CEST)
- Postal code: 23273
- Area code: +381(0)23
- Car plates: ZR

Novo Miloševo (Serbian Cyrillic: Ново Милошево) is a village located in the Novi Bečej municipality, in the Central Banat District of Serbia. It is situated in the Province of Vojvodina. The village has a Serb majority (76.09%) with an ethnic Hungarian minority (14.57%). Its population is 6,763 people as of the 2002 census.

== Name ==
The village was formed after the Second World War when former villages of Beodra and Dragutinovo were joined into one single village known as Novo Miloševo. Before 1918, Dragutinovo was known as Karlovo.

== History ==
The former village of Beodra was first mentioned in 1331. It was established at present-day location from 1742–53, and was settled by Serbs from Potisje and Pomorišje. The village of Karlovo was established in 1751 by former Serb frontiersmen. In 1918, the name of the village was changed from Karlovo to Dragutinovo, after Dragutin Ristić, a colonel in the Serbian army, whose unit occupied the village. In 1946, Dragutinovo and Beodra were joined into one single village known as Novo Miloševo, after Miloš Popov Klima, a noted Partisan who was born in Dragutinovo.

== Culture ==
Cultural monuments in Novo Miloševo include:

- Karačonji Castle built in 1842-46
- Saint Magdalena Catholic Church built in 1838-41
- Serbian Orthodox Church of St Archangel built in 1842
- Iconostasis in the Serbian Orthodox Church of St Stefan from 1778

Cultural event Dani Teodora Pavlovića was established in 2000, in honor of the prominent writer and editor from Novo Miloševo. It has been held annually since then, with corresponding literary awards.

== Historical population ==
- 1961: 9,276
- 1971: 8,548
- 1981: 7,805
- 1991: 7,308
- 2002: 6,763

== People ==
- Teodor Pavlović, writer and editor
- Ranko Žeravica, Yugoslav and Serbian basketball coach
- Mikhail Rodzianko, Russian politician.

== See also ==
- List of places in Serbia
- List of cities, towns and villages in Vojvodina

== Gallery ==
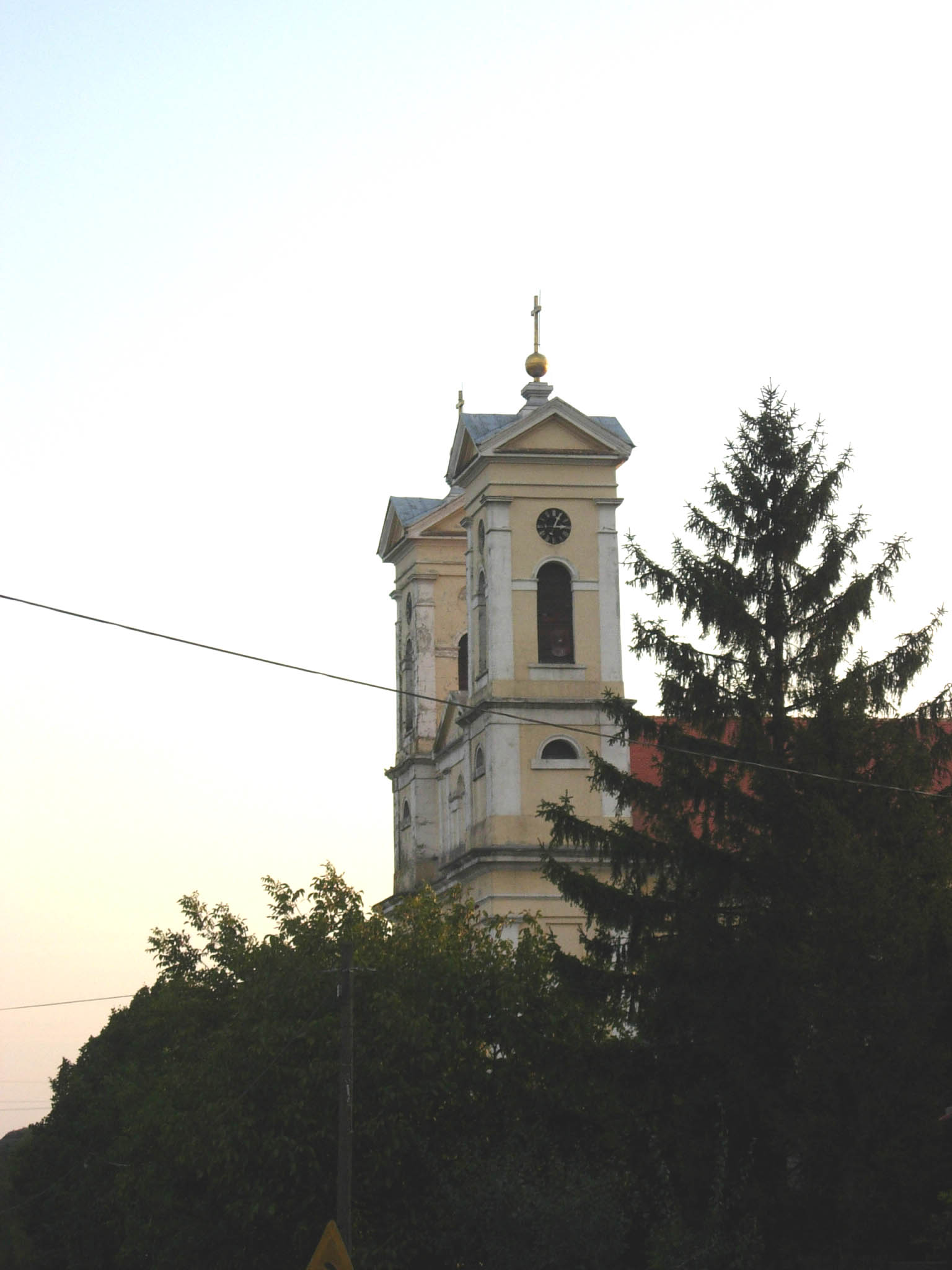
The Saint Maria Magdalena Catholic Church.

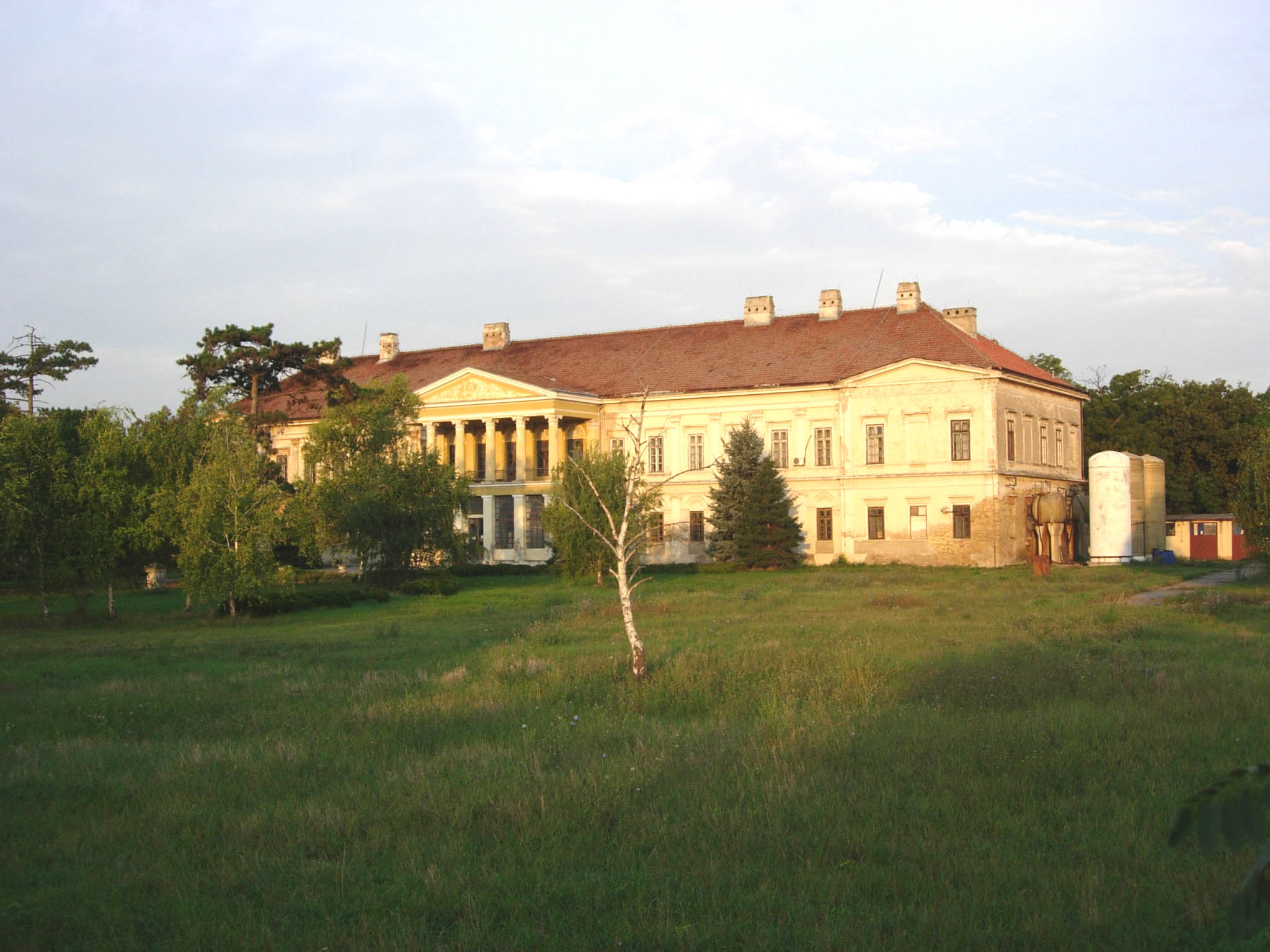
The Karačonji (Karácsonyi) Castle.
