= Alioune Badara Guèye =

Senegalese basketball player

Personal information
- Nationality: Senegalese
- Born: 21 January 1949 (age 76); Dakar, Senegal

Sport
- Sport: Basketball

Alioune Badara Guèye (born 21 January 1949) is a Senegalese basketball player. He competed in the men's tournament at the 1968 Summer Olympics and the 1972 Summer Olympics.
