= Inocente Cuesta =

Cuban basketball player

Personal information
- Born: 28 December 1943 (age 81); Holguín, Cuba

Sport
- Sport: Basketball

Inocente Cuesta (born 28 December 1943) is a Cuban basketball player. He competed in the men's tournament at the 1968 Summer Olympics.
