= Cheikh Amadou Fall =

Senegalese basketball player

Personal information
- Nationality: Senegalese
- Born: 7 February 1946; Dakar, Senegal
- Died: 19 June 2008 (aged 62); Dakar, Senegal

Sport
- Sport: Basketball

Cheikh Amadou Fall (7 February 1946 – 19 June 2008) was a Senegalese basketball player. He competed in the men's tournament at the 1968 Summer Olympics and the 1972 Summer Olympics.
