= Nicolas Alvarado =

Panamanian basketball player (born 1944)

Personal information
- Born: 19 June 1944 (age 81) Darién Province, Panama

Sport
- Sport: Basketball

Nicolas Alvarado (born 19 June 1944) is a Panamanian basketball player. He competed in the men's tournament at the 1968 Summer Olympics.
