= Fernando Tiscareño =

Mexican basketball player (born 1945)

Fernando Tiscareño (born 12 August 1945 in Ciudad Juárez, Chihuahua) is a Mexican former basketball player who competed in the 1968 Summer Olympics.
