= Davis Peralta =

Panamanian basketball player (born 1948)

Davis Peralta (born 15 June 1948 in El Chorrillo) is a Panamanian former basketball player who competed in the 1968 Summer Olympics.
