= Santi Zabaleta =

Spanish basketball player

Personal information
- Full name: Luis Carlos Santiago Zabaleta
- Nationality: Spanish
- Born: 5 September 1946 (age 78); Rentería, Guipúzcoa, Spain
- Height: 187 cm (6 ft 2 in)
- Weight: 79 kg (174 lb)

Sport
- Sport: Basketball

Luis Carlos Santiago Zabaleta (born 5 September 1946 in Rentería, Guipúzcoa), known as Santi Zabaleta, is a Spanish basketball player. He competed in the men's tournament at the 1968 Summer Olympics.
