= Moussa Sène =

Senegalese basketball player

Personal information
- Nationality: Senegalese
- Born: 19 January 1946 (age 79); Dakar, Senegal

Sport
- Sport: Basketball

Moussa Sène (born 19 January 1946) is a Senegalese basketball player. He competed in the men's tournament at the 1968 Summer Olympics.
