= Moulay Ahmed Riadh =

Moroccan basketball player

Personal information
- Nationality: Moroccan
- Born: 12 March 1948 (age 77); Casablanca, Morocco

Sport
- Sport: Basketball

Moulay Ahmed Riadh (born 12 March 1948) is a Moroccan basketball player. He competed in the men's tournament at the 1968 Summer Olympics.
