= Basketball at the 1952 Summer Olympics – Men's team rosters =

The following is the list of squads for each of the 23 teams that competed in the men's basketball tournament at the 1952 Summer Olympics.

== Argentina ==
The following players represented Argentina:

- Alberto López
- Hugo del Vecchio
- Ignacio Poletti
- Juan Gazsó
- Juan Uder
- Leopoldo Contarbio
- Omar Monza
- Oscar Furlong
- Rafael Lledó
- Raúl Pérez
- Ricardo González
- Roberto Viau
- Rubén Menini
- Rubén Pagliari

== Belgium ==
The following players represented Belgium:

- Alexis Van Gils
- Désiré Ligon
- Félix Roosemont
- Henri Coosemans
- Henri Crick
- Jan Ceulemans
- Johannes Ducheyne
- Josef du Jardin
- Jef Eygel
- Jules Boes
- Julien Meuris
- Yvan Delsarte

== Brazil ==
The following players represented Brazil:

- Alfredo da Motta
- Almir
- Angelim
- Godinho
- Bráz
- Zé Luiz
- Mário Jorge
- Mayr Facci
- Raymundo dos Santos
- Ruy de Freitas
- Tião
- Thales
- Algodão

== Bulgaria ==
The following players represented Bulgaria:

- Gencho Khristov
- Georgi Panov
- Iliya Georgiev
- Kiril Semov
- Konstantin Georgiev
- Konstantin Totev
- Neycho Neychev
- Veselin Penkov
- Vladimir Savov
- Vasil Manchenko
- Anton Kuzov
- Khristo Donchev
- Petar Shishkov
- Ivan Nikolov

== Canada ==
The following players represented Canada:

- Bernard Pickel
- Chuck Dalton
- George Wearring
- Glen Pettinger
- Harry Wade
- Carl Ridd
- Woody Campbell
- Bob Phibbs
- Bobby Simpson
- Roy Williams
- Bill Pataky
- Bill Coulthard

== Chile ==
The following players represented Chile:

- Álvaro Salvadores
- Eduardo Cordero
- Eric Mahn
- Exequiel Figueroa
- Hernán Raffo
- Hernán Ramos
- Hugo Fernández
- Juan José Gallo
- Juan Ostoic
- Orlando Silva
- Pedro Araya
- Rufino Bernedo
- Victor Mahaña

== Cuba ==
The following players represented Cuba:

- Alberto Escoto
- Alfredo Faget
- Armando Estrada
- Carlos Bea
- Casimiro García
- Fabio Ruíz
- Fico López
- Felipe de la Pozas
- Juan García
- Mario Quintero
- Ramón Wiltz
- Raúl García

== Czechoslovakia ==
The following players represented Czechoslovakia:

- Eugen Horniak
- Ivan Mrázek
- Jan Kozák
- Jaroslav Šíp
- Jiří Baumruk
- Jiří Matoušek
- Josef Ezr
- Luboš Kolář
- Miloslav Kodl
- Miroslav Baumruk
- Miroslav Škeřík
- Zdeněk Bobrovský
- Zdeněk Rylich

== Egypt ==
The following players represented Egypt:

- Abdel Rahman Hafez Ismail
- Albert Tadros
- Armand Catafago
- Fouad Abdel Meguid El-Kheir
- Raymond Sabounghi
- George Chalhoub
- Hussain Montassir
- Youssef Mohamed
- Mohamed Medhat Bahgat
- Mohamed Ali Ahmed El-Rashidy
- Sami Mansour
- Youssef Abou Ouf
- Youssef Abbas
- Zaki Harari

== Finland ==
The following players represented Finland:

- Eero Salonen
- Esko Karhunen
- Kalevi Heinänen
- Tapio Pöyhönen
- Juhani Kyöstilä
- Oiva Virtanen
- Pentti Laaksonen
- Pertti Mutru
- Raimo Lindholm
- Raine Nuutinen
- Timo Suviranta

== France ==
The following players represented France:

- André Buffière
- André Chavet
- André Vacheresse
- Bernard Planque
- Jacques Dessemme
- Robert Monclar
- Jean Perniceni
- Jean-Paul Beugnot
- Jean-Pierre Salignon
- Louis Devoti
- René Chocat
- Robert Crost
- Robert Guillin
- Roger Haudegand

== Greece ==
The following players represented Greece:

- Alexandros Spanoudakis
- Aristeidis Roubanis
- Mimis Stefanidis
- Dimitrios Taliadoros
- Ioannis Lambrou
- Ioannis Spanoudakis
- Konstantinos Papadimas
- Nikolaos Milas
- Panagiotis Manias
- Faidon Matthaiou
- Stelios Arvanitis
- Themis Cholevas

== Hungary ==
The following players represented Hungary:

- Ede Komáromi
- György Bokor
- György Telegdy
- János Simon
- László Bánhegyi
- László Hódi
- Pál Bogár
- Péter Papp
- Tibor Cselkó
- Tibor Mezőfi
- Tibor Zsíros
- János Greminger
- Tibor Czinkán

== Israel ==
The following players represented Israel:

- Abraham Shneior
- Amos Lin
- Dan Erez
- Daniel Levy
- Eliahu Amiel
- Yehuda Gafni
- Menahem Degani
- Mordechai Hefez
- Ralph Klein
- Reuben Perach
- Shimon Shelah
- Zekaarya Ofri

== Italy ==
The following players represented Italy:

- Achille Canna
- Carlo Cerioni
- Dino Zucchi
- Enrico Pagani
- Fabio Presca
- Federico Marietti
- Giordano Damiani
- Giorgio Bongiovanni
- Luigi Rapini
- Renzo Ranuzzi
- Sergio Ferriani
- Sergio Marelli
- Sergio Stefanini

== Mexico ==
The following players represented Mexico:

Mexico men's national basketball team roster
Players
Coaches

Pos.	No.	Name	Age – Date of birth	Height	Club	Ctr.
	5	Emilio López	28 – 23 August 1923
	13	Fernando Rojas	30 – 2 August 1921
	14	José Rojas	28 – 9 November 1923
	15	Filiberto Manzo	32 – 29 April 1920
	9	Héctor Guerrero	25 – 24 November 1926
	4	Jorge Cardiel	28 – 23 April 1924
	12	José Bru	24 – 9 June 1928
	7	José Meneses	28 – 11 January 1924
	8	José Cabrera	31 – 22 January 1921
	11	Pioquinto Soto	36 – 15 July 1915
	6	Rolando Rubalcava	28 – 22 July 1923
	6	Rubén Almanza	22 – 28 July 1929
	3	Sergio Holguín	23 – 15 April 1929

Head coach

- (Mexico) Antonio Delgado

Legend

- Club – describes last
  club before the competition
- Age – describes age
  on 14 July 1952

== Philippines ==
The following players represented the Philippines:

- Antonio Genato
- Antonio Martínez
- Antonio Tantay
- Carlos Loyzaga
- Eduardo Lim
- Florentino Bautista
- José Gochangco
- Mariano Tolentino
- Meliton Santos
- Ponciano Saldaña
- Rafael Hechanova
- Ramón Campos

== Romania ==
The following players represented Romania:

- Adrian Petroșanu
- Andrei Folbert
- Cezar Niculescu
- Cornel Călugăreanu
- Dan Niculescu
- Emanoil Răducanu
- Gheorghe Constantinide
- Grigore Costescu
- Ladislau Mokos
- Liviu Naghy
- Mihai Nedef
- Vasile Popescu

== Soviet Union ==
The following players represented the Soviet Union:

- Viktor Vlasov
- Stepas Butautas
- Joann Lõssov
- Kazys Petkevičius
- Nodar Jorjik'ia
- Anatoly Konev
- Otar Korkia
- Ilmar Kullam
- Yury Ozerov
- Aleksandr Moiseyev
- Heino Kruus
- Justinas Lagunavičius
- Maigonis Valdmanis
- Stasys Stonkus

== Switzerland ==
The following players represented Switzerland:

- Bernard Schmied
- Georges Stockly
- Gérald Cottier
- Henri Baumann
- Jacques Redard
- Jean-Pierre Voisin
- Marcos Bossy
- Marcel Moget
- Maurice Chollet
- Pierre Albrecht
- René Chiappino
- René Wohler
- Roger Domenjoz
- Roger Prahin

== Turkey ==
The following players represented Turkey:

- Ali Uras
- Altan Dinçer
- Erdoğan Partener
- Mehmet Ali Yalım
- Nejat Diyarbakırlı
- Sacit Seldüz
- Sadi Gülçelik
- Turhan Tezol
- Yalçın Granit
- Yılmaz Gündüz
- Yüksel Alkan

== United States ==
The following players represented the United States:

- Charlie Hoag
- Bill Hougland
- Dean Kelley
- Bob Kenney
- Clyde Lovellette
- Marc Freiberger
- Wayne Glasgow
- Frank McCabe
- Dan Pippin
- Howie Williams
- Ron Bontemps
- Bob Kurland
- Bill Lienhard
- John Keller

== Uruguay ==
The following players represented Uruguay:

- Martín Acosta y Lara
- Enrique Baliño
- Victorio Cieslinskas
- Héctor Costa
- Nelson Demarco
- Héctor García
- Roberto Lovera
- Adesio Lombardo
- Tabaré Borges
- Sergio Matto
- Wilfredo Peláez
- Carlos Roselló
