= Basketball at the 1952 Summer Olympics =

3rd Olympic Basketball Tournament
- Helsinki 1952

Tournament details
- Olympics: 1952 Summer Olympics
- Host nation: Finland
- City: Helsinki
- Duration: July 13 – August 2, 1952

Men's tournament
- Teams: 23
Medals
Gold medalists	United States
Silver medalists	Soviet Union
Bronze medalists	Uruguay

Tournaments
← London 1948	Melbourne 1956 →

Basketball at the 1952 Summer Olympics was the third appearance of the sport of basketball as an official Olympic medal event. 23 nations entered the competition.

The top six teams at the 1948 Summer Olympics qualified automatically, as did the winners of the 1950 FIBA World Championship (Argentina), the top two teams at the 1951 EuroBasket (USSR and Czechoslovakia), and the host country (Finland). Thirteen other nations competed in a qualifying round to determine the last six places in the sixteen-team Olympic tournament.

Basketball

== Medalists ==
Gold	Silver	Bronze
United States; Ron Bontemps; Marc Freiberger; Wayne Glasgow; Charlie Hoag; Bill Hougland; John Keller; Dean Kelley; Bob Kenney; Bob Kurland; Bill Lienhard; Clyde Lovellette; Frank McCabe; Dan Pippin; Howie Williams	Soviet Union; Stepas Butautas; Nodar Dzhordzhikiya; Anatoly Konev; Otar Korkiya; Heino Kruus; Ilmar Kullam; Justinas Lagunavičius; Joann Lõssov; Aleksandr Moiseyev; Yuri Ozerov; Kazys Petkevičius; Stasys Stonkus; Maigonis Valdmanis; Viktor Vlasov	Uruguay; Martín Acosta y Lara; Enrique Baliño; Victorio Cieslinskas; Héctor Costa; Nelson Demarco; Héctor García Otero; Tabaré Larre Borges; Adesio Lombardo; Roberto Lovera; Sergio Matto; Wilfredo Peláez; Carlos Roselló

== Qualifying rounds ==
Nations that lost two games in the qualifying rounds were eliminated. When there were only two teams left in each group, those teams advanced to the main tournament.

=== Group A ===
Group A consisted of Cuba, Belgium, Bulgaria, and Switzerland.

Round 1
Cuba	59
Belgium	51
Bulgaria	69
Switzerland	58
Elimination Match
Belgium	59
Switzerland	49

Round 2
Cuba	56
Bulgaria	62
Decider Match
Cuba	71
Belgium	63

Qualified
Bulgaria
Cuba

=== Group B ===
Group B consisted of Hungary, Greece, Israel, and the Philippines.

Round 1
Hungary	75
Greece	38
Philippines	57
Israel	47
Elimination Match
Greece	54
Israel	52

Round 2
Hungary	35
Philippines	48
Decider Match
Hungary	47
Greece	44

Qualified
Philippines
Hungary

=== Group C ===
Group C consisted of Canada, Italy, Turkey, Romania, and Egypt.

Round 1
Canada	68
Italy	57
Elimination Round 1
Italy	49
Turkey	37

Round 2
Romania	51
Canada	72
Egypt	64
Turkey	45
Elimination Round 2
Romania	39
Italy	53

Round 3
Canada	63
Egypt	57
Decider Match
Egypt	66
Italy	62

Qualified
Canada
Egypt

== Group stage ==
The top two teams in each group advanced to the quarterfinal round.

=== Group A ===
Pos	Team	Pld	W	L	PF	PA	PD	Pts	Qualification
1	United States	3	3	0	195	139	+56	6	Qualified for the quarterfinals
2	Uruguay	3	2	1	167	164	+3	5	Qualified for the quarterfinals
3	Czechoslovakia	3	1	2	161	164	−3	4	
4	Hungary	3	0	3	143	199	−56	3	

Source: Official Report, p. 676

25 July 1952

OR p. 680

United States	66–48	Hungary
Scoring by half: 37–23, 27–25

Tennispalatsi, Helsinki
Referees: Vanderperren (BEL), Wabby (EGY)

25 July 1952

OR p. 680

Uruguay	53–51	Czechoslovakia
Scoring by half: 32–32, 21–19

Tennispalatsi, Helsinki
Referees: Kostine (URS), Porto (BRA)

25 July 1952

OR p. 681

Uruguay	70–56	Hungary
Scoring by half: 36–33, 34–23

Tennispalatsi, Helsinki
Referees: Follati (ITA), Siener (FRA)

25 July 1952

OR p. 682

United States	72–47	Czechoslovakia
Scoring by half: 35–21, 37–26

Tennispalatsi, Helsinki
Referees: Ashri (EGY), Reverberi (ITA)

27 July 1952

OR p. 683

Czechoslovakia	63–39	Hungary
Scoring by half: 34–23, 29–16

Tennispalatsi, Helsinki
Referees: Vanderperren (BEL), Siniakov (URS)

27 July 1952

OR p. 683

United States	56–44	Uruguay
Scoring by half: 32–27, 24–17

Tennispalatsi, Helsinki
Referees: Siener (FRA), Chuard (SUI)

=== Group B ===
Pos	Team	Pld	W	L	PF	PA	PD	Pts	Qualification
1	Soviet Union	3	3	0	192	143	+49	6	Qualified for the quarterfinals
2	Bulgaria	3	2	1	163	182	−19	5	Qualified for the quarterfinals
3	Mexico	3	1	2	172	171	+1	4	
4	Finland	3	0	3	147	178	−31	3	

Source: Official Report, p. 676

25 July 1952

OR p. 680

Soviet Union	74–46	Bulgaria
Scoring by half: 38–21, 36–25

Tennispalatsi, Helsinki
Referees: Reverberi (ITA), Posvar (TCH)

25 July 1952

OR p. 680

Mexico	66–48	Finland
Scoring by half: 36–21, 30–27

Tennispalatsi, Helsinki
Referees: Siener (FRA), Atakol (TUR)

25 July 1952

OR p. 681

Bulgaria	52–44	Mexico
Scoring by half: 27–16, 25–28

Tennispalatsi, Helsinki
Referees: Lastra (ARG), Szilagyi (HUN)

25 July 1952

OR p. 682

Soviet Union	47–35	Finland
Scoring by half: 23–14, 24–21

Tennispalatsi, Helsinki
Referees: Vanderperren (BEL), Wahby (EGY)

27 July 1952

OR p. 682

Bulgaria	65–64	Finland
Scoring by half: 31–30, 34–34

Tennispalatsi, Helsinki
Referees: Lastra (ARG), Wahby (EGY)

27 July 1952

OR p. 683

Soviet Union	71–62	Mexico
Scoring by half: 31–21, 40–40

Tennispalatsi, Helsinki
Referees: Reverberi (ITA), Atakol (TUR)

=== Group C ===
Pos	Team	Pld	W	L	PF	PA	PD	Pts	Qualification
1	Argentina	3	3	0	239	196	+43	6	Qualified for the quarterfinals
2	Brazil	3	2	1	184	179	+5	5	Qualified for the quarterfinals
3	Philippines	3	1	2	192	221	−29	4	
4	Canada	3	0	3	201	220	−19	3	

Source: Official Report, p. 676

25 July 1952

OR p. 680

Argentina	85–59	Philippines
Scoring by half: 44–30, 41–29

Tennispalatsi, Helsinki
Referees: Ashri (EGY), Szilagyi (HUN)

25 July 1952

OR p. 680

Brazil	57–55	Canada
Scoring by half: 33–27, 24–28

Tennispalatsi, Helsinki
Referees: Follati (ITA), Bilek (TUR)

25 July 1952

OR p. 682

Brazil	71–52	Philippines
Scoring by half: 32–25, 39–27

Tennispalatsi, Helsinki
Referees: Farrell (USA), Siniakov (URS)

25 July 1952

OR p. 682

Argentina	82–81	Canada
Scoring by half: 42–48, 40–33

Tennispalatsi, Helsinki
Referees: Chuard (SUI), Stefanovits (YUG)

27 July 1952

OR p. 683

Philippines	81–65	Canada
Scoring by half: 40–35, 41–30

Tennispalatsi, Helsinki
Referees: Ashri (EGY), Stefanovitch (YUG)

27 July 1952

OR p. 683

Argentina	72–56	Brazil
Scoring by half: 31–21, 41–35

Tennispalatsi, Helsinki
Referees: Farrell (USA), Gruia (ROU)

=== Group D ===
Pos	Team	Pld	W	L	GF	GA	GD	Pts	Qualification
1	France	3	3	0	202	149	+53	6	Qualified for the quarterfinals
2	Chile	3	2	1	170	150	+20	5	Qualified for the quarterfinals
3	Egypt	3	1	2	176	221	−45	4	
4	Cuba	3	0	3	149	177	−28	3	

Source: Official Report, p. 676

25 July 1952

OR p. 680

France	92–64	Egypt
Scoring by half: 39–30, 53–34

Tennispalatsi, Helsinki
Referees: Farrell (USA), Stefanovitch (YUG)

25 July 1952

OR p. 681

Chile	53–52	Cuba
Scoring by half: 32–32, 32–20

Tennispalatsi, Helsinki
Referees: Lastra (ARG), Siniakov (URS)

25 July 1952

OR p. 682

Chile	74–46	Egypt
Scoring by half: 47–18, 27–28

Tennispalatsi, Helsinki
Referees: Porto (BRA), Posvar (TCH)

25 July 1952

OR p. 682

France	58–42	Cuba
Scoring by half: 30–17, 28–25

Tennispalatsi, Helsinki
Referees: Kostine (URS), Atakol (TUR)

27 July 1952

OR p. 683

France	52–43	Chile
Scoring by half: 25–17, 27–26

Tennispalatsi, Helsinki
Referees: Kostine (URS), Chong (KOR)

27 July 1952

OR p. 683

Egypt	66–55	Cuba
Scoring by half: 35–28, 31–27

Tennispalatsi, Helsinki
Referees: Porto (BRA), Posvar (TCH)

== Quarterfinals ==
The top two teams in each quarterfinals advanced to the semifinals. The other two teams in each quarterfinals played in the fifth through eighth place classification.

=== Group E ===
Pos	Team	Pld	W	L	PF	PA	PD	Pts	Qualification
1	Uruguay	3	2	1	194	187	+7	5 (Note: Uruguay–Argentina: 66–65)	Qualified for the semifinals
2	Argentina	3	2	1	226	174	+52	5	Qualified for the semifinals
3	Bulgaria	3	1	2	177	220	−43	4 (Note: Bulgaria–France: 67–58)	Qualified for 5th–8th placement playoffs
4	France	3	1	2	178	194	−16	4	Qualified for 5th–8th placement playoffs

Source: Official Report, p. 676
Notes:

28 July 1952

OR p. 684

Argentina	100–56	Bulgaria
Scoring by half: 53–29, 47–27

Tennispalatsi, Helsinki
Referees: Vanderperren (BEL), Porto (BRA)

28 July 1952

OR p. 684

France	68–66	Uruguay
Scoring by half: 38–30, 30–36

Tennispalatsi, Helsinki
Referees: Farrell (USA), Kostine (URS)

29 July 1952

OR p. 684

Uruguay	62–54	Bulgaria
Scoring by half: 35–27, 27–27

Tennispalatsi, Helsinki
Referees: Porto (BRA), Follati (ITA)

29 July 1952

OR p. 685

Argentina	61–52	France
Scoring by half: 31–27, 30–25

Tennispalatsi, Helsinki
Referees: Wahby (EGY), Siniakov (URS)

30 July 1952

FIBA

Bulgaria	67–58	France
Scoring by half: 39–23, 28–35

Tennispalatsi, Helsinki
Referees: Kostine (URS), Porto (CHI)

30 July 1952

OR p. 686

Uruguay	66–65	Argentina
Scoring by half: 39–31, 27–34

Tennispalatsi, Helsinki
Referees: Reverberi (ITA), Stefanovitch (YUG)

=== Group F ===
Pos	Team	Pld	W	L	PF	PA	PD	Pts	Qualification
1	United States	3	3	0	246	166	+80	6	Qualified for the semifinals
2	Soviet Union	3	2	1	190	195	−5	5	Qualified for the semifinals
3	Brazil	3	1	2	177	155	+22	4	Qualified for 5th–8th placement playoffs
4	Chile	3	0	3	159	256	−97	3	Qualified for 5th–8th placement playoffs

Source: Official Report, p. 676

28 July 1952

OR p. 684

United States	86–58	Soviet Union
Scoring by half: 36–22, 50–36

Tennispalatsi, Helsinki
Referees: Siener (FRA), Wahby (EGY)

28 July 1952

OR p. 684

Brazil	75–44	Chile
Scoring by half: 36–25, 39–19

Tennispalatsi, Helsinki
Referees: Reverberi (ITA), Ashri (EGY)

29 July 1952

OR p. 684

United States	103–55	Chile
Scoring by half: 47–32, 56–23

Tennispalatsi, Helsinki
Referees: Ashri (EGY), Posvar (TCH)

29 July 1952

OR p. 685

Soviet Union	54–49	Brazil
Scoring by half: 21–25, 33–24

Tennispalatsi, Helsinki
Referees: Reverberi (ITA), Chuard (SUI)

30 July 1952

OR p. 686

United States	57–53	Brazil
Scoring by half: 24–26, 33–27

Tennispalatsi, Helsinki
Referees: Wahby (EGY), Posvar (TCH)

30 July 1952

OR p. 686

Soviet Union	78–60	Chile
Scoring by half: 41–29, 37–31

Tennispalatsi, Helsinki
Referees: Chuard (SUI), Follati (ITA)

== Knockout rounds ==
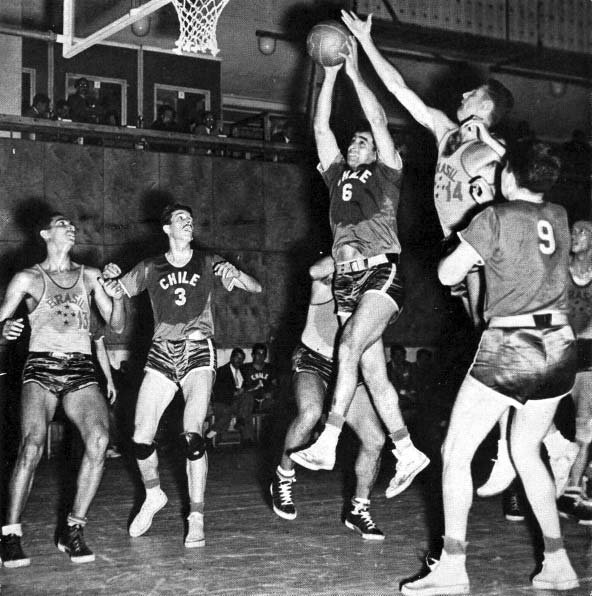
The 5th place match between Chile and Brazil

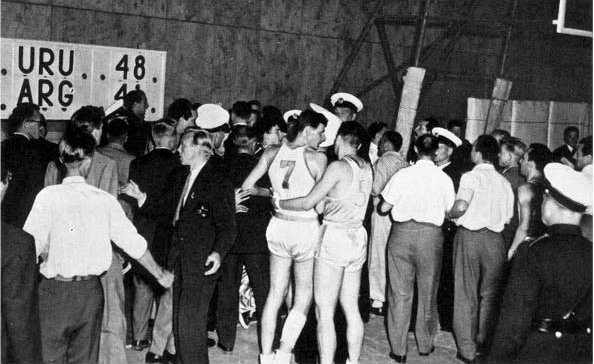
The bronze medal game between Uruguay and Argentina

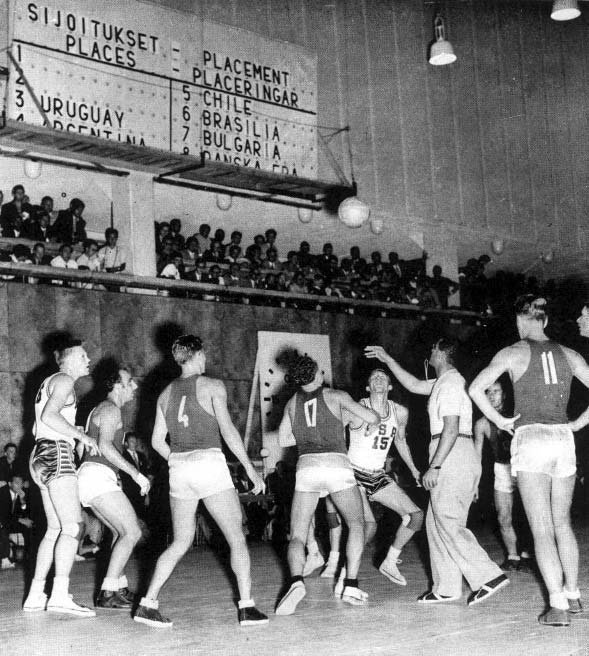
The final match between the Soviet Union and the United States

=== Brackets ===
Classification semifinals
Chile	60
Bulgaria	53
Brazil	59
France	44

5th place match
Chile	58
Brazil	49
7th place match
Bulgaria	58
France	44

Semifinals
July 31
Soviet Union	61
Uruguay	57
August 1
United States	85
Argentina	76

Gold medal match
August 2
United States	36
Soviet Union	25
Bronze medal match
August 2
Uruguay	68
Argentina	59

==== Semifinals ====
Classification 5–8 semifinals

31 July 1952
09:00

OR p. 686

Chile	60–53	Bulgaria
Scoring by half: 37–29, 23–24
Pts: Badrie 22		Pts: Panov 13

Messuhalli, Helsinki
Referees: Reverberi (ITA), Wahby (EGY)

31 July 1952
10:30

OR p. 686

Brazil	59–44	France
Scoring by half: 31–26, 28–18

Messuhalli, Helsinki
Referees: Lastra (ARG), Bilek (TUR)

Medal round semifinals

31 July 1952

OR p. 688

Soviet Union	61–57	Uruguay
Scoring by half: 31–28, 30–29

Messuhalli, Helsinki
Referees: Vanderperren (BEL), Chuard (SUI)

31 July 1952

OR p. 688

United States	85–76	Argentina
Scoring by half: 43–39, 42–37

Messuhalli, Helsinki
Referees: Ashri (EGY), Siener (FRA)

==== Finals ====
7th place final

1 August 1952
09:00

OR p. 688

Bulgaria	58–44	France
Scoring by half: 22–22, 36–24
Pts: Panov 12		Pts: Vacheresse 9

Messuhalli, Helsinki
Referees: Farrell (USA), Lastra (ARG)

5th place final

2 August 1952
09:00

OR p. 688

Chile	58–49	Brazil
Scoring by half: 32–24, 26–25
Pts: Cordero Fernández 14		Pts: Da Motta 16

Messuhalli, Helsinki
Referees: Chuard (SUI), Atakol (TUR)

Bronze medal match

1 August 1952
16:00

OR p. 688

Uruguay	68–59	Argentina
Scoring by half: 31–24, 37–35
Pts: Lombardo 23		Pts: Gazsó 19

Messuhalli, Helsinki
Referees: Follati (ITA), Wahby (EGY)

Gold medal match

2 August 1952
16:00

OR p. 688

United States	36–25	Soviet Union
Scoring by half: 17–15, 19–10
Pts: Lovellette 9		Pts: Korkia 8

Messuhalli, Helsinki
Referees: Vanderperren (BEL), Wahby (EGY)

== Awards ==
1952 Olympic Basketball Champions

United States
Third title

== Participating nations ==
For the team rosters see: Basketball at the 1952 Summer Olympics – Men's team rosters.

Each country was allowed to enter one team of 14 players and they all were eligible for participation. A total number of 317 players were entered.

A total of 301(*) basketball players from 23 nations competed at the Helsinki Games:

- Argentina (14)
- Belgium (13)
- Brazil (13)
- Bulgaria (14)
- Canada (13)
- Chile (13)
- Cuba (12)
- Czechoslovakia (14)
- Egypt (14)
- Finland (14)
- France (14)
- Greece (12)
- Hungary (13)
- Israel (12)
- Italy (13)
- Mexico (13)
- Philippines (12)
- Romania (12)
- Soviet Union (14)
- Switzerland (14)
- Turkey (12)
- United States (14)
- Uruguay (12)

(*) NOTE: There are only players counted, which participated in one game at least. Up to now only two reserve player can be named, 14 reserve players are unknown.

== Team rosters ==
Place	Nation
1	United States
	Marc Freiberger (Peoria Caterpillars/Oklahoma); Wayne Glasgow (Phillips 66ers/Oklahoma); Charlie Hoag (Kansas); Bill Hougland (Phillips 66ers/Kansas); John Keller (Kansas); Dean Kelley (Kansas); Bob Kenney (Kansas); Bob Kurland (Phillips 66ers/Oklahoma St.); Bill Lienhard (Kansas); Clyde Lovellette (Kansas); Frank McCabe (Peoria Caterpillars/Marquette); Dan Pippin (Peoria Caterpillars/Missouri); Howie Williams (Peoria Caterpillars/Purdue)
2	Soviet Union
	Head Coach: Stepan Spandaryan; Stepas Butautas (Žalgiris Kaunas); Nodar Dzhordzhikiya (Dinamo Tbilisi); Anatoly Konev (Dynamo Moscow); Otar Korkiya (Dinamo Tbilisi); Heino Kruus (Tallinna Kalev); Ilmar Kullam (Tallinna Kalev); Justinas Lagunavičius (Žalgiris Kaunas); Joann Lõssov (Tallinna Kalev); Aleksandr Moiseyev (VVS Moscow); Yuri Ozerov (Dynamo Moscow); Kazys Petkevičius (Žalgiris Kaunas); Stasys Stonkus (Žalgiris Kaunas); Maigonis Valdmanis (Rīgas ASK); Viktor Vlasov (Dynamo Moscow)
3	Uruguay
	Martín Acosta y Lara; Enrique Baliño; Victorio Cieslinskas; Héctor Costa; Nelson Demarco; Héctor García Otero; Tabaré Larre Borges; Adesio Lombardo; Roberto Lovera; Sergio Matto; Wilfredo Peláez; Carlos Roselló
4	Argentina Head Coach: Jorge Canavesi; Leopoldo Contarbio; Hugo del Vecchio; Óscar Furlong; Juan Gazsó; Ricardo González; Rafael Lledó; Alberto López; Rubén Menini; Omar Monza; Rubén Pagliari; Raúl Pérez Varela; Ignacio Poletti; Juan Uder; Roberto Viau
5	Chile Pedro Araya Zabala; Rufino Bernedo; Eduardo Cordero Fernández; Hugo Fernández Diez; Ezequiel Figueroa Reyes; Juan José Gallo Chinchilla; Víctor Mahana Badrie; Eric Mahn Godoy; Juan Ostoic Ostoic; Hermán Raffo Abarca; Hermán Ramos Muñoz; Álvaro Salvadores; Orlando Silva Infante
6	Brazil Head Coach: Manoel Pitanga; Angelim; Bráz; Raymundo Carvalho dos Santos; Mário Jorge da Fonseca Hermes; Almir Nelson de Almeida; Algodão; Ruy de Freitas; Mayr Facci; Tião; Godinho; Thales Monteiro; Alfredo da Motta; Zé Luiz
7	Bulgaria Petar Chichkov; Hristo Donev; Ilja Georgiev; Konstantin Georgiev; Genczo Hristov; Anton Kuzov; Vasil Manchenko; Nejczo Neichev; Ivan Nikolov; Georgi Panov; Veselin Penkov; Kiril Semov; Vladimir Slavov; Konstantin Totev
8	France André Buffière; André Chavet; René Chocat; Robert Crost; Jacques Dessemme; Louis Devoti; Robert Guillin; Roger Haudegand; Robert Monclar; Jean Perniceni; Bernard Planque; Jean-Pierre Salignon; André Vacheresse; Jean-Paul Beugnot
9–16	Canada Woody Campbell; Bill Coulthard; Red Curren; Chuck Dalton; Bill Pataky; Glenn Pettinger; Bob Phibbs; Bernie Pickell; Carl Ridd; Bobby Simpson; Harry Wade; George Wearring; Roy Williams
9–16	Cuba Carlos Bea; Felipe de la Pozas y Piad; Alberto Escoto Valdés; Armando Estrada Rivero; Alfredo Faget Otazo; Casimiro García Artime; Juan García García; Carlos García Ordoñez; Federico López Garviso; Mario Quintero Padrón; Fabio Ruiz Vinajeras; Ramón Wiltz Bucelo
9–16	Czechoslovakia Head Coach: Josef Fleischlinger; Jiří Baumruk; Miroslav Baumruk; Zdeněk Bobrovský; Josef Ezr; Eugen Horniak; Miroslav Kódl; Luboš Kolář; Jan Kozák; Jiří Matoušek; Ivan Mrázek; Zdeněk Rylich; Jaroslav Šíp; Miroslav Škeřík; Jaroslav Tetiva
9–16	Egypt Youssef Abbas; Youssef Abou Ouf; Fouad Abdel Meguid Abu el Kheir; Mohamed Medhat Bahgat; Armand Philippe Catafago; Georges Jean Chalhoub; Mohamed Ezz Eldin Aly Ahmed el Rashidy; Abdelrahman Ismail Hafez; Zaki Selim Ibrahim Harari; Sami Mansour; Medhat Youssef Mohamad; Hussein Kamal Montassir; Fahmy Raymond Sabounghi; Albert Fahmy Tadros
9–16	Finland Kalevi Heinänen; Esko Karhunen; Juhani Kyöstilä; Pentti Laaksonen; Olavi Lahtinen; Raimo Lindholm; Pertti Mutru; Raine Nuutinen; Tapio Pöyhönen; Tuomo Ristola; Eero Salonen; Timo Suviranta; Kalevi Sylander; Oiva Virtanen
9–16	Hungary László Bánhegyi; Pál Bogár; György Bokor; Tibor Cselkó; Tibor Czinkán; János Greminger; László Hódi; Ede Komáromi; Tibor Mezőfi; Péter Papp; János Simon; György Telegdy; Tibor Zsíros
9–16	Mexico Rubén Almanza García; Carlos José Bru Villarreal; Jorge Cardiel Gaytán; José de la Cruz Cabrera Gándara; Héctor Guerrero Delgado; Emilio López Enríquez; Filiberto Manzo Hernández; José Meneses Luna; Sergio Olguín Fierro; Fernando Rojas Herrera; José Rojas Herera; Rolando Rubalcava Peña; Pioquinto Soto
9–16	Philippines Head Coach: Felicisimo Fajardo; Florentino Bautista; Ramón Campos; Antonio Genato; José Gochangco; Rafael Hechanova; Eduardo Lim; Carlos Loyzaga; Antonio Luis Martínez; Ponciano Saldaña; Meliton Santos; Antonio Tantay; Mariano Tolentino
17–23	Belgium Jules Boes; Jan Ceulemans; Henri Coosemans; Henri Crick; Yves Delsarte; Josef du Jardin; Johannes Ducheyne; Jef Eygel; Désiré Ligon; Julien Meuris; Félix Roosemont; Alexis van Gils; Pierre van Huele
17–23	Greece Head Coach: Vladimiros Vallas; Stelios Arvanitis (Panathinaikos); Themistokles Cholevas (Panellinios); Ioannis Lambrou (Panathinaikos); Panayiotis Manias (Panellinios); Phaedon Mathaiou (Panathinaikos); Nikolaos Milas (Panathinaikos); Konstantinos Papadimas (Panellinios); Aristidis Roubanis (Panellinios); Alexandros Spanoudakis (Olympiacos); Ioannis Spanoudakis (Olympiacos); Dimitrios Stefanidis (Panellinios); Dimitrios Taliadoros (XAN Thessaloniki)
17–23	Israel Head Coach: Tubby Raskin; Eliahu Amiel (Hapoel Holon); Moshe Daniel-Levy (Hapoel Maayan Barukh); Dan Erez-Buxenbaum (Hapoel Tel Aviv); Reuben Fecher-Perach (Hapoel Mizra); Mordechai-Marcel Hefez (Hapoel Holon); Ralph Klein (Raphael Ram) (Maccabi Tel Aviv); Menahem Kurman-Degani (Maccabi Tel Aviv); Amos Lin-Linkovsky (Hapoel Mishmar Ha'emek); Zekarya Ofri (Maccabi Tel Aviv); Shimon Shelah-Schmuckler (Hapoel Tel Aviv); Abraham Shneior (Maccabi Tel Aviv); Yehuda Wiener-Gafni (Maccabi Tel Aviv) Freddie Cohen (Hapoel Holon)
17–23	Italy Giorgio Bongiovanni; Achille Canna; Carlo Cerioni; Giordano Damiani; Sergio Ferriani; Sergio Marelli; Federico Marietti; Enrico Pagani; Fabio Presca; Renzo Ranuzzi; Luigi Rapini; Sergio Stefanini; Dino Zucchi
17–23	Romania Head Coach: Alexandru Popescu; Cornel Călugăreanu; Gheorghe Constantinide; Grigore Costescu; Andrei Folbert; Ladislau Mokos; Liviu Naghi; Mihai Nedef; Cezar Niculescu; Dan Niculescu; Adrian Petroşanu; Vasile Popescu; Emanoil Răducanu Constantin Herold
17–23	Switzerland Pierre Albrecht; Henri Baumann; Marc Bossy; René Chiappino; Maurice Chollet; Gerald Cottier; Roger Domenjoz; Marcel Moget; Roger Prahin; Jacques Redard; Bernard Schmied; Georges Stockly; Jean-Pierre Voisin; René Wohler
17–23	Turkey Yüksel Alkan; Altan Dinçer; Nejat Diyarbakırlı; Yalçın Granit; Sadi Gülçelik; Yılmaz Gündüz; Erdoğan Partener; Sacit Seldüz; Turhan Tezol; Güney Ülmen; Ali Uras; Mehmet Ali Yalım
