= List of Olympic medalists in basketball =

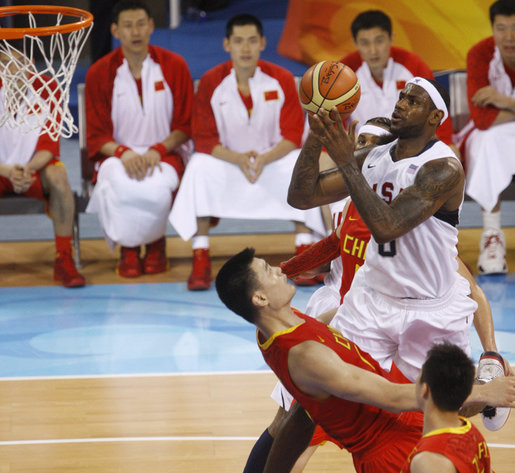
LeBron James (USA, in white) attempts a shot against China's Yao Ming at the 2008 Olympics.

Basketball is a sport contested at the Summer Olympic Games. A men's basketball tournament was first held at the 1904 Olympics as a demonstration; it has been held at every Summer Olympics since 1936. In the 1972 Olympics, the final game between the United States and the Soviet Union was a controversial one, as the game's final three seconds were replayed three times by a FIBA (International Basketball Federation) official without the authority to do so, before the Soviet Union won their first gold medal, which would have been won by the United States if the game was not re-started against the rules. The U.S. filed a formal protest but was rejected by FIBA. As a result, the United States refused to accept the silver medal, and no player has ever claimed his medal. After a protest of the Soviet invasion of Afghanistan, the United States boycotted the 1980 Moscow Olympics. The Soviet Union boycotted the 1984 Los Angeles Olympics in response. Both boycotts affected basketball at the Olympics, as both had successful basketball teams at the time. Until 1992, the Olympics were restricted to "amateur" players. The advent of the state-sponsored "full-time amateur athlete" of the Eastern Bloc countries further eroded the ideology of the pure amateur, as it put the self-financed amateurs of the Western countries at a disadvantage. The Soviet Union entered teams of athletes who were all nominally students, soldiers, or working in a profession, but all of whom were in reality paid by the state to train on a full-time basis. In April 1989, through the leadership of Secretary General Borislav Stanković, FIBA approved the rule that allowed NBA players to compete in international tournaments, including the Olympics. In the next Olympics, the 1992 Summer Games, the "Dream Team" won the gold medal at the 1992 basketball tournament, with an average winning margin of 44 points per game, and without calling a single time out. By this time, the Soviet Union and Yugoslavia no longer existed, but their successor states continued to be among the leading forces. Two newly independent countries of the former Yugoslavia and Soviet Union, Croatia and Lithuania, won the silver and bronze medals respectively.

American woman Diana Taurasi is the all-time leader for the most Olympic medals in basketball, with six gold, with three other women having won five medals—Americans Sue Bird (five gold) and Teresa Edwards (four gold and one bronze) plus Australia's Lauren Jackson (three silver and two bronze). Nine players have won four medals: Americans Lisa Leslie, Tamika Catchings, Sylvia Fowles (each with four golds with the women's team), Kevin Durant (four gold medals), Carmelo Anthony, and LeBron James (each with three golds and one bronze with the men's team); Soviet Gennadi Volnov (one gold, two silver, one bronze) and Sergei Belov (one gold, three bronze), and Australian Kristi Harrower (three silver, one bronze). Taurasi is the all-time leader for the most consecutive gold medal wins in basketball. Five other individuals, all American, have won three golds – Katie Smith, Dawn Staley, Sheryl Swoopes, Seimone Augustus, and Breanna Stewart – and 23 other players, not including the previously mentioned, have won three medals. Two other American women, Kelsey Plum and Jackie Young, are the only players to have won medals of any color in both the full-court and 3x3 variants of the sport. Both won golds in the debut of 3x3 in 2020 and in the full-court game in 2024.

The United States is by far the most successful country in full-court Olympic basketball, with United States men's teams having won 17 of 20 tournaments in which they participated, including seven consecutive titles from 1936 through 1968. United States women's teams have won 10 titles out of the 12 tournaments in which they competed, including eight in a row from 1996 to 2024. Besides the United States, Argentina is the only nation still in existence that has won either the men's or women's tournament. The Soviet Union, Yugoslavia and the Unified Team are the countries no longer in existence that have won the tournament. The United States is the defending champion of both the men's and women's tournaments. As of the 2016 Summer Olympics, 90 medals (30 of each color) have been awarded to teams from 20 National Olympic Committees.

Two gold medal-winning teams were inducted to the Naismith Memorial Basketball Hall of Fame in 2010. The 1960 U.S. Olympic team featured four players who would eventually enter the Hall of Fame as players, one of whom later entered the Hall as a contributor; a head coach who would enter the Hall as a contributor; and a team manager who entered the Hall as a coach. The 1992 U.S. Olympic team, better known as the "Dream Team", had 11 future Hall of Fame players, along with three coaches who were inducted to the Hall as coaches (one of whom was previously inducted separately for his accomplishments as a player).

On June 9, 2017, the executive board of the International Olympic Committee announced that 3x3 basketball would become an official Olympic sport as of the 2020 Summer Olympics in Tokyo, Japan, for both men and women.

== Men ==
Individuals who have been inducted to the Naismith Hall of Fame (including announced members awaiting induction) are indicated as follows:

- Bold type: Inducted as players.
- Italics: Inducted in a non-playing role.
- **Bold italics**: Inducted in both categories.

=== Basketball ===
Games	Gold	Silver	Bronze
1936 Berlin	United States; Sam Balter; Ralph Bishop; Joe Fortenberry; Tex Gibbons; Francis Johnson; Carl Knowles; Frank Lubin; Art Mollner; Donald Piper; Jack Ragland; Willard Schmidt; Carl Shy; Duane Swanson; Bill Wheatley	Canada; Gordon Aitchison; Ian Allison; Art Chapman; Chuck Chapman; Edward Dawson; Irving Meretsky; Doug Peden; James Stewart; Malcolm Wiseman	Mexico; Carlos Borja; Víctor Borja; Rodolfo Choperena; Luis de la Vega; Raúl Fernández; Andrés Gómez; Silvio Hernández; Francisco Martínez; Jesús Olmos; José Pamplona; Greer Skousen
1948 London	United States; Cliff Barker; Don Barksdale; Ralph Beard; Lew Beck; Vince Boryla; Gordon Carpenter; Alex Groza; Wallace Jones; **Bob Kurland**; Ray Lumpp; R. C. Pitts; Jesse Renick; Jackie Robinson; Kenny Rollins	France; André Barrais; Michel Bonnevie; André Buffière; René Chocat; René Dérency; Maurice Desaymonnet; André Even; Maurice Girardot; Fernand Guillou; Raymond Offner; Jacques Perrier; Yvan Quénin; Lucien Rebuffic; Pierre Thiolon	Brazil; Algodão; Bráz; Ruy de Freitas; Marcus Vinícius Dias; Affonso Évora; Alexandre Gemignani; Alfredo da Motta; Alberto Marson; Nilton Pacheco; Massinet Sorcinelli
1952 Helsinki	United States; Ron Bontemps; Marc Freiberger; Wayne Glasgow; Charlie Hoag; Bill Hougland; John Keller; Dean Kelley; Bob Kenney; **Bob Kurland**; Bill Lienhard; **Clyde Lovellette**; Frank McCabe; Dan Pippin; Howie Williams	Soviet Union; Stepas Butautas; Nodar Dzhordzhikiya; Anatoly Konev; Otar Korkia; Heino Kruus; Ilmar Kullam; Justinas Lagunavičius; Joann Lõssov; Aleksandr Moiseyev; Yuri Ozerov; Kazys Petkevičius; Stasys Stonkus; Maigonis Valdmanis; Vikto Vlasov	Uruguay; Martín Acosta y Lara; Enrique Baliño; Victorio Cieslinskas; Héctor Costa; Nelson Demarco; Héctor García Otero; Tabaré Larre Borges; Adesio Lombardo; Roberto Lovera; Sergio Matto; Wilfredo Peláez; Carlos Roselló
1956 Melbourne	United States; **K. C. Jones**; Burdette Haldorson; Carl Cain; Gilbert Ford; Dick Boushka; James Walsh; Charles Darling; William Evans; Bill Hougland; Robert Jeangerard; **Bill Russell**; Ronald Tomsic	Soviet Union; Arkady Bochkaryov; Maigonis Valdmanis; Viktor Zubkov; Jānis Krūmiņš; Algirdas Lauritėnas; Valdis Muižnieks; Yuri Ozerov; Kazys Petkevičius; Mikhail Semyonov; Stasys Stonkus; Mikhail Studenetsky; Vladimir Torban	Uruguay; Carlos Blixen; Ramiro Cortés; Héctor Costa; Nelson Chelle; Nelson Demarco; Héctor García; Carlos González; Sergio Matto; Oscar Moglia; Raúl Mera; Ariel Olascoaga; Milton Scaron
1960 Rome	United States; Jay Arnette; **Walt Bellamy**; Bob Boozer; Terry Dischinger; Burdette Haldorson; Darrall Imhoff; Allen Kelley; Lester Lane; **Jerry Lucas**; **Oscar Robertson**; Adrian Smith; **Jerry West**	Soviet Union; Yuri Korneev; Jānis Krūmiņš; Guram Minashvili; Valdis Muižnieks; Cesars Ozers; Aleksandr Petrov; Mikhail Semyonov; Vladimir Ugrekelidze; Maigonis Valdmanis; Albert Valtin; Gennadi Volnov; Viktor Zubkov	Brazil; Edson Bispo dos Santos; Moyses Blas; Waldemar Blatskauskas; Algodão; Carmo de Souza; Carlos Domingos Massoni; Waldyr Geraldo Boccardo; Wlamir Marques; Amaury Antônio Pasos; Fernando Pereira de Freitas; Antonio Salvador Sucar; Eduardo Schall Jatyr
1964 Tokyo	United States; Jim Barnes; **Bill Bradley**; Larry Brown; Joe Caldwell; Mel Counts; Dick Davies; Walt Hazzard; Lucious Jackson; Pete McCaffrey; Jeff Mullins; Jerry Shipp; George Wilson	Soviet Union; Armenak Alachachian; Nikolai Bagley; Vyacheslav Khrynin; Juris Kalnins; Yuri Korneev; Jānis Krūmiņš; Jaak Lipso; Levan Moseshvili; Valdis Muižnieks; Aleksandr Petrov; Aleksandr Travin; Gennadi Volnov	Brazil; Edson Bispo dos Santos; Friedrich Wilhelm Braun; Carmo de Souza; Carlos Domingos Massoni; Wlamir Marques; Victor Mirshawka; Amaury Antônio Pasos; **Ubiratan Pereira Maciel**; Antonio Salvador Sucar; Jatyr Eduardo Schall; José Edvar Simones; Sergio de Toledo Machado
1968 Mexico City	United States; Michael Barrett; John Clawson; Don Dee; Calvin Fowler; **Spencer Haywood**; Bill Hosket; Jim King; Glynn Saulters; **Charles Scott**; Mike Silliman; Kenneth Spain; **Joseph White**	Yugoslavia; Dragutin Čermak; **Krešimir Ćosić**; Vladimir Cvetković; Ivo Daneu; **Radivoj Korać**; Trajko Rajković; Zoran Maroević; Dragoslav Ražnatović; Petar Skansi; Damir Šolman; Nikola Plećaš; Aljoša Zorga	Soviet Union; Anatoli Polivoda; Anatoli Krikun; Vadim Kapranov; Vladimir Andreev; Sergei Kovalenko; Modestas Paulauskas; Jaak Lipso; Gennadi Volnov; Priit Tomson; Zurab Sakandelidze; Yury Selichov; **Sergei Belov**
1972 Munich	Soviet Union; Anatoli Polivoda; Modestas Paulauskas; Zurab Sakandelidze; Alzhan Zharmukhamedov; Aleksandr Boloshev; Ivan Edeshko; **Sergei Belov**; Mikheil Korkia; Ivan Dvorny; Gennadi Volnov; Alexander Belov; Sergei Kovalenko	United States; Kenneth Davis; Doug Collins; Tom Henderson; Mike Bantom; **Robert Jones**; Dwight Jones; James Forbes; Jim Brewer; Tom Burleson; Tom McMillen; Kevin Joyce; Ed Ratleff^{[a]}	Cuba; Juan Domecq; Ruperto Herrera; Juan Roca; Pedro Chappé; Miguel Álvarez Pozo; Rafael Canizares; Conrado Perez; Miguel Calderon; Tomas Herrera; Oscar Varona; Alejandro Urgelles; Franklin Standard
1976 Montreal	United States; Phil Ford; Steve Sheppard; **Adrian Dantley**; **Walter Davis**; Quinn Buckner; Ernie Grunfeld; Kenneth Carr; Scott May; Tate Armstrong; Tom LaGarde; Phil Hubbard; Mitch Kupchak	Yugoslavia; Blagoje Georgievski; Dragan Kićanović; Vinko Jelovac; Rajko Žižić; Željko Jerkov; Andro Knego; Zoran Slavnić; **Krešimir Ćosić**; Damir Šolman; Žarko Varajić; **Dražen Dalipagić**; Mirza Delibašić	Soviet Union; Vladimir Arzamaskov; Aleksandr Salnikov; Valeri Miloserdov; Alzhan Zharmukhamedov; Andrei Makeyev; Ivan Edeshko; **Sergei Belov**; Vladimir Tkachenko; Anatoli Myshkin; Mikheil Korkia; Alexander Belov; Vladimir Zhigily
1980 Moscow	Yugoslavia; Andro Knego; Dragan Kićanović; Rajko Žižić; Mihovil Nakić; Željko Jerkov; Branko Skroče; Zoran Slavnić; **Krešimir Ćosić**; Ratko Radovanović; Duje Krstulović; **Dražen Dalipagić**; Mirza Delibašić	Italy; Romeo Sacchetti; Roberto Brunamonti; Michael Silvester; Enrico Gilardi; Fabrizio Della Fiori; Marco Solfrini; Marco Bonamico; **Dino Meneghin**; Renato Villalta; Renzo Vecchiato; Pierluigi Marzorati; Pietro Generali	Soviet Union; Stanislav Eremin; Valeri Miloserdov; Sergei Tarakanov; Aleksandr Salnikov; Andrei Lopatov; Nikolai Derugin; **Sergei Belov**; Vladimir Tkachenko; Anatoli Myshkin; Sergejus Jovaiša; Alexander Belostenny; Vladimir Zhigily
1984 Los Angeles	United States; Steve Alford; Leon Wood; **Patrick Ewing**; Vern Fleming; Alvin Robertson; **Michael Jordan**; Joe Kleine; Jon Koncak; Wayman Tisdale; **Chris Mullin**; Sam Perkins; Jeffrey Turner	Spain; José Manuel Beirán; José Luis Llorente; Fernando Arcega; Josep Maria Margall; Andrés Jiménez; Fernando Romay; Fernando Martín Espina; Juan Antonio Corbalán; Ignacio Solozábal; Juan Domingo de la Cruz; Juan Manuel López Iturriaga; Juan Antonio San Epifanio	Yugoslavia; **Dražen Petrović**; Aleksandar Petrović; Nebojša Zorkić; Rajko Žižić; Ivan Sunara; Emir Mutapčić; Sabit Hadžić; Andro Knego; Ratko Radovanović; Mihovil Nakić; **Dražen Dalipagić**; Branko Vukićević
1988 Seoul	Soviet Union; Alexander Volkov; Tiit Sokk; Sergei Tarakanov; **Šarūnas Marčiulionis**; Igors Miglinieks; Valeri Tikhonenko; Rimas Kurtinaitis; **Arvydas Sabonis**; Viktor Pankrashkin; Valdemaras Chomičius; Alexander Belostenny; Valery Goborov	Yugoslavia; **Dražen Petrović**; Zdravko Radulović; Zoran Čutura; **Toni Kukoč**; Žarko Paspalj; Željko Obradović; Jure Zdovc; Stojko Vranković; **Vlade Divac**; Franjo Arapović; **Dino Rađa**; Danko Cvjetičanin	United States; **Mitch Richmond**; Charles E. Smith; Charles D. Smith; Bimbo Coles; Jeff Grayer; Willie Anderson; Stacey Augmon; Dan Majerle; Danny Manning; J. R. Reid; **David Robinson**; Hersey Hawkins
1992 Barcelona	United States; **Charles Barkley**; **Larry Bird**; **Clyde Drexler**; **Patrick Ewing**; **Magic Johnson**; **Michael Jordan**; Christian Laettner; **Karl Malone**; **Chris Mullin**; **Scottie Pippen**; **David Robinson**; **John Stockton**^{[a]}	Croatia; Vladan Alanović; Franjo Arapović; Danko Cvjetičanin; Alan Gregov; Arijan Komazec; **Toni Kukoč**; Aramis Naglić; Velimir Perasović; **Dražen Petrović**; **Dino Rađa**; Žan Tabak; Stojko Vranković	Lithuania; Romanas Brazdauskis; Valdemaras Chomičius; Darius Dimavičius; Gintaras Einikis; Sergejus Jovaiša; Artūras Karnišovas; Gintaras Krapikas; Rimas Kurtinaitis; **Šarūnas Marčiulionis**; Alvydas Pazdrazdis; **Arvydas Sabonis**; Arūnas Visockas
1996 Atlanta	United States; **Charles Barkley**; **Grant Hill**; Anfernee Hardaway; **David Robinson**; **Scottie Pippen**; **Mitch Richmond**; **Reggie Miller**; **Karl Malone**; **John Stockton**; **Shaquille O'Neal**; **Gary Payton**; **Hakeem Olajuwon**	FR Yugoslavia; Miroslav Berić; Dejan Bodiroga; Predrag Danilović; **Vlade Divac**; Aleksandar Đorđević; Nikola Lončar; Saša Obradović; Žarko Paspalj; Željko Rebrača; Zoran Savić; Dejan Tomašević; Milenko Topić	Lithuania; Gintaras Einikis; Andrius Jurkūnas; Artūras Karnišovas; Rimas Kurtinaitis; Darius Lukminas; **Šarūnas Marčiulionis**; Tomas Pačėsas; **Arvydas Sabonis**; Saulius Štombergas; Rytis Vaišvila; Eurelijus Žukauskas; Mindaugas Žukauskas
2000 Sydney	United States; Shareef Abdur-Rahim; **Ray Allen**; Vin Baker; **Vince Carter**; **Kevin Garnett**; **Tim Hardaway**; Allan Houston; **Jason Kidd**; Antonio McDyess; **Alonzo Mourning**; **Gary Payton**; Steve Smith	France; Jim Bilba; Yann Bonato; Makan Dioumassi; Laurent Foirest; Thierry Gadou; Cyril Julian; Crawford Palmer; Antoine Rigaudeau; Stéphane Risacher; Laurent Sciarra; Moustapha Sonko; Frédéric Weis	Lithuania; Dainius Adomaitis; Gintaras Einikis; Andrius Giedraitis; Šarūnas Jasikevičius; Kęstutis Marčiulionis; Darius Maskoliūnas; Tomas Masiulis; Ramūnas Šiškauskas; Darius Songaila; Saulius Štombergas; Mindaugas Timinskas; Eurelijus Žukauskas
2004 Athens	Argentina; Carlos Delfino; Gabriel Fernández; **Emanuel Ginóbili**; Leonardo Gutiérrez; Walter Herrmann; Alejandro Montecchia; Andrés Nocioni; Fabricio Oberto; Pepe Sánchez; Luis Scola; Hugo Sconochini; Rubén Wolkowyski	Italy; Gianluca Basile; Massimo Bulleri; Roberto Chiacig; Giacomo Galanda; Luca Garri; Denis Marconato; Michele Mian; Gianmarco Pozzecco; Nikola Radulović; Alex Righetti; Rodolfo Rombaldoni; Matteo Soragna	United States; **Carmelo Anthony**; Carlos Boozer; **Tim Duncan**; **Allen Iverson**; LeBron James; Richard Jefferson; Stephon Marbury; Shawn Marion; Lamar Odom; Emeka Okafor; **Amar'e Stoudemire**; **Dwyane Wade**
2008 Beijing	United States; Carlos Boozer; **Jason Kidd**; LeBron James; Deron Williams; Michael Redd; **Dwyane Wade**; **Kobe Bryant**; **Dwight Howard**; **Chris Bosh**; Chris Paul; Tayshaun Prince; **Carmelo Anthony**^{[a]}	Spain; **Pau Gasol**; Rudy Fernández; Ricky Rubio; Juan Carlos Navarro; José Calderón; Felipe Reyes; Carlos Jiménez; Raül López; Berni Rodríguez; Marc Gasol; Álex Mumbrú; Jorge Garbajosa	Argentina; Carlos Delfino; **Manu Ginóbili**; Román González; Leonardo Gutiérrez; Juan Pedro Gutiérrez; Federico Kammerichs; Andrés Nocioni; Fabricio Oberto; Antonio Porta; Pablo Prigioni; Paolo Quinteros; Luis Scola
2012 London	United States; Tyson Chandler; Kevin Durant; LeBron James; Russell Westbrook; Deron Williams; Andre Iguodala; **Kobe Bryant**; Kevin Love; James Harden; Chris Paul; Anthony Davis; **Carmelo Anthony**	Spain; **Pau Gasol**; Rudy Fernández; Sergio Rodríguez; Juan Carlos Navarro; José Calderón; Felipe Reyes; Víctor Claver; Fernando San Emeterio; Sergio Llull; Marc Gasol; Serge Ibaka; Víctor Sada	Russia; Alexey Shved; Timofey Mozgov; Sergey Karasev; Vitaly Fridzon; Alexander Kaun; Evgeny Voronov; Viktor Khryapa; Semyon Antonov; Sergei Monia; Dmitri Khvostov; Anton Ponkrashov; Andrei Kirilenko
2016 Rio de Janeiro	United States; Jimmy Butler; Kevin Durant; DeAndre Jordan; Kyle Lowry; Harrison Barnes; DeMar DeRozan; Kyrie Irving; Klay Thompson; DeMarcus Cousins; Paul George; Draymond Green; **Carmelo Anthony**	Serbia; Miloš Teodosić; Marko Simonović; Bogdan Bogdanović; Stefan Marković; Nikola Kalinić; Nemanja Nedović; Stefan Birčević; Miroslav Raduljica; Nikola Jokić; Vladimir Štimac; Stefan Jović; Milan Mačvan	Spain; **Pau Gasol**; Rudy Fernández; Sergio Rodríguez; Juan Carlos Navarro; José Manuel Calderón; Felipe Reyes; Víctor Claver; Willy Hernangómez; Álex Abrines; Sergio Llull; Nikola Mirotić; Ricky Rubio
2020 Tokyo	United States; Bam Adebayo; Devin Booker; Kevin Durant; Jerami Grant; Draymond Green; Jrue Holiday; Keldon Johnson; Zach LaVine; Damian Lillard; JaVale McGee; Khris Middleton; Jayson Tatum	France; Andrew Albicy; Nicolas Batum; Petr Cornelie; Nando de Colo; Moustapha Fall; Evan Fournier; Rudy Gobert; Thomas Heurtel; Timothé Luwawu-Cabarrot; Frank Ntilikina; Vincent Poirier; Guerschon Yabusele	Australia; Aron Baynes; Matthew Dellavedova; Dante Exum; Chris Goulding; Josh Green; Joe Ingles; Nick Kay; Jock Landale; Patty Mills; Duop Reath; Nathan Sobey; Matisse Thybulle
2024 Paris	United States; Bam Adebayo; Devin Booker; Stephen Curry; Anthony Davis; Kevin Durant; Anthony Edwards; Joel Embiid; Tyrese Haliburton; Jrue Holiday; LeBron James; Jayson Tatum; Derrick White	France; Andrew Albicy; Nicolas Batum; Isaïa Cordinier; Bilal Coulibaly; Nando de Colo; Evan Fournier; Rudy Gobert; Mathias Lessort; Frank Ntilikina; Matthew Strazel; Victor Wembanyama; Guerschon Yabusele	Serbia; Aleksa Avramović; Bogdan Bogdanović; Dejan Davidovac; Ognjen Dobrić; Marko Gudurić; Nikola Jokić; Nikola Jović; Vanja Marinković; Vasilije Micić; Nikola Milutinov; Filip Petrušev; Uroš Plavšić
2028 Los Angeles			

=== 3x3 basketball ===
Games	Gold	Silver	Bronze
2020 Tokyo	Latvia; Agnis Čavars; Edgars Krūmiņš; Kārlis Lasmanis; Nauris Miezis	ROC; Ilia Karpenkov; Kirill Pisklov; Stanislav Sharov; Alexander Zuev	Serbia; Dušan Domović Bulut; Dejan Majstorović; Aleksandar Ratkov; Mihailo Vasić
2024 Paris	Netherlands; Jan Driessen; Dimeo van der Horst; Arvin Slagter; Worthy de Jong	France; Lucas Dussoulier; Timothé Vergiat; Jules Rambaut; Franck Seguela	Lithuania; Šarūnas Vingelis; Gintautas Matulis; Aurelijus Pukelis; Evaldas Džiaugys
2028 Los Angeles			

== Women ==
Individuals who have been inducted to the Naismith Hall of Fame (including announced members awaiting induction) are indicated as follows:

- Bold type: Inducted as players.
- Italics: Inducted in a non-playing role.

=== Basketball ===
Games	Gold	Silver	Bronze
1976 Montreal	Soviet Union; Olga Barysheva; Tamāra Dauniene; Natalya Klimova; Tatyana Ovechkina; Angelė Rupšienė; Nadezhda Shuvayeva; Nadezhda Zakharova; **Uljana Semjonova**; Raisa Kurvyakova; Nelli Feryabnikova; Olga Sukharnova; Tetiana Zakharova	United States; Cindy Brogdon; Susan Rojcewicz; **Ann Meyers**; **Lusia Harris**; Nancy Dunkle; Charlotte Lewis; **Nancy Lieberman**; Gail Marquis; Patricia Roberts; Mary Anne O'Connor; Patricia Head; Juliene Simpson	Bulgaria; Krasimira Bogdanova; Diana Dilova; Krasimira Gyurova; Penka Metodieva; Snezhana Mikhaylova; Girgina Skerlatova; Mariya Stoyanova; Margarita Shtarkelova; Petkana Makaveeva; Nadka Golcheva; Penka Stoyanova; Todorka Yordanova
1980 Moscow	Soviet Union; Olga Barysheva; Tatyana Ivinskaya; Nelli Feryabnikova; Vida Beselienė; Tatyana Ovechkina; Angelė Rupšienė; Lyubov Sharmay; **Uljana Semjonova**; Tetiana Nadyrova; Olga Sukharnova; Nadezhda Shuvayeva-Olkhova; Lyudmila Rogozhina	Bulgaria; Krasimira Bogdanova; Vanya Dermendzhieva; Silviya Germanova; Petkana Makaveeva; Nadka Golcheva; Penka Stoyanova; Evladiya Slavcheva; Kostadinka Radkova; Snezhana Mikhaylova; Angelina Mikhaylova; Penka Metodieva; Diana Dilova	Yugoslavia; Vera Ðurašković; Mersada Bećirspahić; Jelica Komnenović; Mira Bjedov; Vukica Mitić; Sanja Ožegović; Sofija Pekić; Marija Tonković; Zorica Ðurković; Vesna Despotović; Biljana Majstorović; Jasmina Perazić
1984 Los Angeles	United States; **Teresa Edwards**; Lea Henry; **Lynette Woodard**; **Anne Donovan**; Cathy Boswell; **Cheryl Miller**; Janice Lawrence; Cindy Noble; Kim Mulkey; **Denise Curry**; Pamela McGee; Carol Menken-Schaudt	South Korea; Choi Aei-young; Kim Eun-sook; Lee Hyung-sook; Choi Kyung-hee; Lee Mi-ja; Moon Kyung-ja; Kim Hwa-soon; Jeong Myung-hee; Kim Young-hee; Sung Jung-a; Park Chan-sook	China; Chen Yuefang; Li Xiaoqin; Ba Yan; Song Xiaobo; Qiu Chen; Wang Jun; Xiu Lijuan; Zheng Haixia; Cong Xuedi; Zhang Hui; Liu Qing; Zhang Yueqin
1988 Seoul	United States; **Teresa Edwards**; Kamie Ethridge; Cynthia Brown; **Anne Donovan**; **Teresa Weatherspoon**; Bridgette Gordon; Vicky Bullett; Andrea Lloyd; **Katrina McClain**; Jennifer Gillom; **Cynthia Cooper**; Suzanne McConnell	Yugoslavia; Stojna Vangelovska; Mara Lakić; Žana Lelas; Eleonora Wild; Kornelija Kvesić; Danira Bilić; Slađana Golić; Polona Dornik; Razija Mujanović; Vesna Bajkuša; Anđelija Arbutina; Bojana Milošević	Soviet Union; Olga Buryakina; Yelena Khudashova; Vitalija Tuomaitė; Olga Yakovleva; Galina Savitskaya; Aleksandra Leonova; Olga Yevkova; Irina Sumnikova; Irina Minkh; Irina Gerlits; Olesya Barel; Natalya Zasulskaya
1992 Barcelona	Unified Team; Elen Bunatyants; Irina Sumnikova; Maryna Tkachenko; Irina Minkh; Irina Gerlits; Svetlana Zaboluyeva; Natalya Zasulskaya; Olena Zhyrko; Yelena Tornikidu; Yelena Shvaybovich; Yelena Khudashova; Yelena Baranova	China; Cong Xuedi; He Jun; Li Dongmei; Li Xin; Liu Jun; Liu Qing; Peng Ping; Wang Fang; Zhan Shuping; Zheng Dongmei; Zheng Haixia	United States; Vicky Bullett; Daedra Charles; **Cynthia Cooper**; Clarissa Davis; Medina Dixon; **Teresa Edwards**; Tammy Jackson; Carolyn Jones; **Katrina McClain**; Suzanne McConnell; Vickie Orr; **Teresa Weatherspoon**
1996 Atlanta	United States; Jennifer Azzi; Ruthie Bolton; **Teresa Edwards**; Venus Lacy; **Lisa Leslie**; **Rebecca Lobo**; **Katrina McClain**; Nikki McCray; Carla McGhee; **Dawn Staley**; Katy Steding; **Sheryl Swoopes**	Brazil; Roseli Gustavo; Marta Sobral; Silvia Andrea Santos Luz; Alessandra Oliveira; Cintia Santos; Claudia Maria Pastor; **Hortência Marcari**; Adriana Santos; Maria Angélica; Janeth Arcain; Maria Paula Silva; Leila Sobral	Australia; Robyn Maher; Rachael Sporn; **Michele Timms**; Michelle Brogan; Trisha Fallon; Allison Cook; Carla Boyd; Sandy Brondello; Shelley Sandie; Fiona Robinson; Michelle Chandler; Jenny Whittle
2000 Sydney	United States; **Teresa Edwards**; **Yolanda Griffith**; **Chamique Holdsclaw**; Ruthie Bolton; **Lisa Leslie**; Nikki McCray; DeLisha Milton-Jones; **Katie Smith**; **Dawn Staley**; **Sheryl Swoopes**; Natalie Williams; Kara Wolters	Australia; Carla Boyd; Sandy Brondello; Trisha Fallon; Michelle Griffiths; Kristi Harrower; Jo Hill; **Lauren Jackson**; Annie La Fleur; Shelley Sandie; Rachael Sporn; **Michele Timms**; Jennifer Whittle	Brazil; Janeth Arcain; Ilisaine David; Lilian Gonçalves; Helen Luz; Silvia Andrea Santos Luz; Cláudia das Neves; Alessandra Oliveira; Adriana Moisés Pinto; Adriana Santos; Cintia Santos; Kelly Santos; Marta Sobral
2004 Athens	United States; **Sue Bird**; **Swin Cash**; **Tamika Catchings**; **Yolanda Griffith**; Shannon Johnson; **Lisa Leslie**; Ruth Riley; **Katie Smith**; **Dawn Staley**; **Sheryl Swoopes**; Diana Taurasi; **Tina Thompson**	Australia; Suzy Batkovic; Sandy Brondello; Trisha Fallon; Kristi Harrower; **Lauren Jackson**; Natalie Porter; Alicia Poto; Belinda Snell; Rachael Sporn; Laura Summerton; Penny Taylor; Allison Tranquilli	Russia; Anna Arkhipova; Olga Arteshina; Yelena Baranova; Diana Goustilina; Maria Kalmykova; Elena Karpova; Ilona Korstin; Irina Osipova; Oxana Rakhmatulina; Tatiana Shchegoleva; Maria Stepanova; Natalia Vodopyanova
2008 Beijing	United States; **Seimone Augustus**; **Sue Bird**; **Tamika Catchings**; **Sylvia Fowles**; Kara Lawson; **Lisa Leslie**; DeLisha Milton-Jones; **Candace Parker**; Cappie Pondexter; **Katie Smith**; Diana Taurasi; **Tina Thompson**	Australia; Erin Phillips; Tully Bevilaqua; Jennifer Screen; Penny Taylor; Suzy Batkovic; Hollie Grima; Kristi Harrower; Laura Summerton; Belinda Snell; Emma Randall; Rohanee Cox; **Lauren Jackson**	Russia; Marina Kuzina; Oxana Rakhmatulina; Natalia Vodopyanova; **Becky Hammon**; Marina Karpunina; Tatiana Shchegoleva; Ilona Korstin; Maria Stepanova; Yekaterina Lisina; Irina Sokolovskaya; Svetlana Abrosimova; Irina Osipova
2012 London	United States; **Lindsay Whalen**; **Seimone Augustus**; **Sue Bird**; **Maya Moore**; Angel McCoughtry; Asjha Jones; **Tamika Catchings**; **Swin Cash**; Diana Taurasi; **Sylvia Fowles**; Tina Charles; **Candace Parker**	France; Isabelle Yacoubou; Endéné Miyem; Clémence Beikes; Sandrine Gruda; Edwige Lawson-Wade; Céline Dumerc; Florence Lepron; Émilie Gomis; Marion Laborde; Élodie Godin; Emmeline Ndongue; Jennifer Digbeu	Australia; Suzy Batkovic; Abby Bishop; Liz Cambage; Kristi Harrower; **Lauren Jackson**; Rachel Jarry; Kathleen MacLeod; Jenna O'Hea; Samantha Richards; Jennifer Screen; Belinda Snell; Laura Summerton
2016 Rio de Janeiro	United States; **Lindsay Whalen**; **Seimone Augustus**; **Sue Bird**; **Maya Moore**; Angel McCoughtry; Breanna Stewart; **Tamika Catchings**; **Elena Delle Donne**; Diana Taurasi; **Sylvia Fowles**; Tina Charles; Brittney Griner	Spain; Leticia Romero; Laura Nicholls; Silvia Domínguez; Alba Torrens; Laia Palau; Marta Xargay; Leonor Rodríguez; Lucila Pascua; Anna Cruz; Laura Quevedo; Laura Gil; Astou Ndour	Serbia; Tamara Radočaj; Sonja Petrović; Saša Čađo; Sara Krnjić; Nevena Jovanović; Jelena Milovanović; Dajana Butulija; Dragana Stanković; Aleksandra Crvendakić; Milica Dabović; Ana Dabović; Danielle Page
2020 Tokyo	United States; Jewell Loyd; Skylar Diggins-Smith; **Sue Bird**; Ariel Atkins; Chelsea Gray; A'ja Wilson; Breanna Stewart; Napheesa Collier; Diana Taurasi; **Sylvia Fowles**; Tina Charles; Brittney Griner	Japan; Moeko Nagaoka; Maki Takada; Naho Miyoshi; Rui Machida; Nako Motohashi; Nanaka Todo; Saki Hayashi; Evelyn Mawuli; Saori Miyazaki; Yuki Miyazawa; Himawari Akaho; Monica Okoye	France; Alexia Chartereau; Héléna Ciak; Alix Duchet; Marine Fauthoux; Sandrine Gruda; Marine Johannès; Sarah Michel; Endéné Miyem; Iliana Rupert; Diandra Tchatchouang; Valériane Vukosavljević; Gabby Williams
2024 Paris	United States; Napheesa Collier; Kahleah Copper; Chelsea Gray; Brittney Griner; Sabrina Ionescu; Jewell Loyd; Kelsey Plum; Breanna Stewart; Diana Taurasi; Alyssa Thomas; A'ja Wilson; Jackie Young	France; Valériane Ayayi; Marième Badiane; Romane Bernies; Alexia Chery; Marine Fauthoux; Marine Johannès; Leïla Lacan; Dominique Malonga; Sarah Michel; Iliana Rupert; Janelle Salaün; Gabby Williams	Australia; Amy Atwell; Isobel Borlase; Cayla George; **Lauren Jackson**; Tess Madgen; Ezi Magbegor; Jade Melbourne; Alanna Smith; Stephanie Talbot; Marianna Tolo; Kristy Wallace; Sami Whitcomb
2028 Los Angeles			

=== 3x3 basketball ===
Games	Gold	Silver	Bronze
2020 Tokyo	United States; Stefanie Dolson; Allisha Gray; Kelsey Plum; Jackie Young	ROC; Evgeniia Frolkina; Olga Frolkina; Yulia Kozik; Anastasia Logunova	China; Wan Jiyuan; Wang Lili; Yang Shuyu; Zhang Zhiting
2024 Paris	Germany; Marie Reichert; Elisa Mevius; Sonja Greinacher; Svenja Brunckhorst	Spain; Vega Gimeno; Sandra Ygueravide; Juana Camilión; Gracia Alonso de Armiño	United States; Dearica Hamby; Cierra Burdick; Hailey Van Lith; Rhyne Howard
2028 Los Angeles			

== Athlete medal leaders ==
=== Men ===
Rank	Athlete	Nation	Olympics	Gold	Silver	Bronze	Total
1	Kevin Durant	United States	2012–2024	4	0	0	4
2	Carmelo Anthony	United States	2004–2016	3	0	1	4
2	LeBron James	United States	2004–2012, 2024	3	0	1	4
4	Gennadi Volnov	Soviet Union	1960–1972	1	2	1	4
5	Sergei Belov	Soviet Union	1968–1980	1	0	3	4
6	David Robinson	United States	1988–1996	2	0	1	3
7	Krešimir Ćosić	Yugoslavia	1968, 1976–1980	1	2	0	3
8	Dražen Dalipagić	Yugoslavia	1976–1984	1	1	1	3
8	Andro Knego	Yugoslavia	1976–1984	1	1	1	3
8	Rajko Žižić	Yugoslavia	1976–1984	1	1	1	3
11	Rimas Kurtinaitis	Soviet Union; Lithuania	1988; 1992–1996	1	0	2	3
11	Šarūnas Marčiulionis	Soviet Union; Lithuania	1988; 1992–1996	1	0	2	3
11	Arvydas Sabonis	Soviet Union; Lithuania	1988; 1992–1996	1	0	2	3
14	Maigonis Valdmanis	Soviet Union	1952–1960	0	3	0	3
14	Jānis Krūmiņš	Soviet Union	1956–1964	0	3	0	3
14	Valdis Muižnieks	Soviet Union	1956–1964	0	3	0	3
17	Dražen Petrović	Yugoslavia; Croatia	1984–1988; 1992	0	2	1	3
17	José Calderón	Spain	2008–2016	0	2	1	3
17	Rudy Fernández	Spain	2008–2016	0	2	1	3
17	Pau Gasol	Spain	2008–2016	0	2	1	3
17	Juan Carlos Navarro	Spain	2008–2016	0	2	1	3
17	Felipe Reyes	Spain	2008–2016	0	2	1	3
23	Gintaras Einikis	Lithuania	1992–2000	0	0	3	3
24	Bob Kurland	United States	1948, 1952	2	0	0	2
24	Bill Hougland	United States	1952, 1956	2	0	0	2
24	Burdette Haldorson	United States	1956, 1960	2	0	0	2
24	Michael Jordan	United States	1984, 1992	2	0	0	2
24	Patrick Ewing	United States	1984, 1992	2	0	0	2
24	Chris Mullin	United States	1984, 1992	2	0	0	2
24	Charles Barkley	United States	1992–1996	2	0	0	2
24	Scottie Pippen	United States	1992–1996	2	0	0	2
24	Karl Malone	United States	1992–1996	2	0	0	2
24	John Stockton	United States	1992–1996	2	0	0	2
24	Gary Payton	United States	1996–2000	2	0	0	2
24	Jason Kidd	United States	2000, 2008	2	0	0	2
24	Kobe Bryant	United States	2008–2012	2	0	0	2
24	Chris Paul	United States	2008–2012	2	0	0	2
24	Deron Williams	United States	2008–2012	2	0	0	2
24	Anthony Davis	United States	2012, 2024	2	0	0	2
24	Bam Adebayo	United States	2020–2024	2	0	0	2
24	Devin Booker	United States	2020–2024	2	0	0	2
24	Jrue Holiday	United States	2020–2024	2	0	0	2
24	Jayson Tatum	United States	2020–2024	2	0	0	2
44	Dragan Kićanović	Yugoslavia	1976–1980	1	1	0	2
45	Mihovil Nakić	Yugoslavia	1980–1984	1	0	1	2
45	Ratko Radovanović	Yugoslavia	1980–1984	1	0	1	2
45	Carlos Delfino	Argentina	2004–2008	1	0	1	2
45	Emanuel Ginóbili	Argentina	2004–2008	1	0	1	2
45	Leonardo Gutiérrez	Argentina	2004–2008	1	0	1	2
45	Dwyane Wade	United States	2004–2012	1	0	1	2
45	Fabricio Oberto	Argentina	2004–2008	1	0	1	2
45	Luis Scola	Argentina	2004–2008	1	0	1	2
53	Bogdan Bogdanović	Serbia	2016–2024	0	1	1	2
53	Nikola Jokić	Serbia	2016–2024	0	1	1	2

=== Women ===
Rank	Athlete	Nation	Olympics	Gold	Silver	Bronze	Total
1	Diana Taurasi	United States	2004–2024	6	0	0	6
2	Sue Bird	United States	2004–2020	5	0	0	5
3	Teresa Edwards	United States	1984–2000	4	0	1	5
4	Lauren Jackson	Australia	2000–2012, 2024	0	3	2	5
5	Lisa Leslie	United States	1996–2008	4	0	0	4
5	Tamika Catchings	United States	2004–2016	4	0	0	4
5	Sylvia Fowles	United States	2008–2020	4	0	0	4
8	Kristi Harrower	Australia	2000–2012	0	3	1	4
9	Sheryl Swoopes	United States	1996–2004	3	0	0	3
9	Dawn Staley	United States	1996–2004	3	0	0	3
9	Katie Smith	United States	2000–2008	3	0	0	3
9	Seimone Augustus	United States	2008–2016	3	0	0	3
9	Breanna Stewart	United States	2016–2024	3	0	0	3
14	Katrina McClain	United States	1988–1996	2	0	1	3
15	Suzy Batkovic	Australia	2004–2012	0	2	1	3
15	Sandy Brondello	Australia	1996–2004	0	2	1	3
15	Trisha Fallon	Australia	1996–2004	0	2	1	3
15	Rachael Sporn	Australia	1996–2004	0	2	1	3
15	Belinda Snell	Australia	2004–2012	0	2	1	3
15	Laura Summerton	Australia	2004–2012	0	2	1	3

== Notes ==
- ^{a} The United States team members did not accept silver medals after a controversy in the gold medal game.
- ^{a} The United States team, also known as the "Dream Team", are also inducted into the Hall of Fame collectively as a unit.
- ^{a} The United States team, also known as the "Redeem Team", are also induct into the Hall of Fame collectively as a unit.
