= Uruguay at the Olympics =

- IOC code: URU
- NOC: Uruguayan Olympic Committee
- Website: www.cou.org.uy (in Spanish)
- Medals Ranked 93rd: Gold 2 Silver 2 Bronze 6 Total 10

Summer appearances
- 1924; 1928; 1932; 1936; 1948; 1952; 1956; 1960; 1964; 1968; 1972; 1976; 1980; 1984; 1988; 1992; 1996; 2000; 2004; 2008; 2012; 2016; 2020; 2024; 2028

Winter appearances
- 1998; 2002–2022; 2026

Uruguay first participated at the Olympic Games in 1924, and has sent athletes to compete in every Summer Olympic Games since then, except when they boycotted the 1980 Summer Olympics. The nation has participated in the Winter Olympic Games for the first time in 1998 and participated again in 2026 after 28 years of absence.

Uruguayan athletes have won ten medals, with two gold medals in football.

Uruguay's National Olympic Committee was created in 1923, and recognized by the International Olympic Committee the same year.

== Medal tables ==
=== Medals by Summer Games ===
Games	Athletes	Gold	Silver	Bronze	Total	Rank
(France) 1924 Paris	33	1	0	0	1	19
(Netherlands) 1928 Amsterdam	22	1	0	0	1	24
(United States) 1932 Los Angeles	2	0	0	1	1	26
(Nazi Germany) 1936 Berlin	37	0	0	0	0	–
(United Kingdom) 1948 London	61	0	1	1	2	26
(Finland) 1952 Helsinki	32	0	0	2	2	37
(Australia) 1956 Melbourne	21	0	0	1	1	56
(Italy) 1960 Rome	34	0	0	0	0	–
(Japan) 1964 Tokyo	23	0	0	1	1	35
1968 Mexico City	27	0	0	0	0	–
(West Germany) 1972 Munich	13	0	0	0	0	–
(Canada) 1976 Montreal	9	0	0	0	0	–
(Soviet Union) 1980 Moscow	boycotted					
(United States) 1984 Los Angeles	18	0	0	0	0	–
(South Korea) 1988 Seoul	15	0	0	0	0	–
(Spain) 1992 Barcelona	16	0	0	0	0	–
(United States) 1996 Atlanta	14	0	0	0	0	–
(Australia) 2000 Sydney	14	0	1	0	1	64
(Greece) 2004 Athens	15	0	0	0	0	–
(China) 2008 Beijing	12	0	0	0	0	–
(United Kingdom) 2012 London	29	0	0	0	0	–
(Brazil) 2016 Rio de Janeiro	17	0	0	0	0	–
(Japan) 2020 Tokyo	11	0	0	0	0	–
(France) 2024 Paris	25	0	0	0	0	–
(United States) 2028 Los Angeles	future event					
(Australia) 2032 Brisbane	future event					
Total		2	2	6	10	93

=== Medals by Winter Games ===
Games	Athletes	Gold	Silver	Bronze	Total	Rank
(Japan) 1998 Nagano	1	0	0	0	0	–
2002–2022	did not participate					
(Italy) 2026 Milano Cortina	1	0	0	0	0	–
(France) 2030 French Alps	future event					
(United States) 2034 Utah	future event					
Total		0	0	0	0	–

=== Medals by summer sport ===
Sports	Gold	Silver	Bronze	Total	Rank
Football	2	0	0	2	8
Rowing	0	1	3	4	40
Cycling	0	1	0	1	40
Basketball	0	0	2	2	21
Boxing	0	0	1	1	69
Total	2	2	6	10	90

=== Medals by gender ===
Gender	Gold	Silver	Bronze	Total
Men	2	2	6	10
Women	0	0	0	0
Mixed	0	0	0	0
Total	2	2	6	10

== List of medalists ==
Medal	Name	Games	Sport	Event
Gold	Football team: José Leandro Andrade Pedro Arispe Pedro Casella Pedro Cea Luis Chiappara Pedro Etchegoyen Alfredo Ghierra Andrés Mazali José Nasazzi José Naya Pedro Petrone Ángel Romano Zoilo Saldombide Héctor Scarone Pascual Somma Humberto Tomasina Antonio Urdinarán Santos Urdinarán Fermín Uriarte José Vidal Alfredo Zibechi Pedro Zingone	(France) 1924 Paris	Football	Men's competition
Gold	Football team: José Leandro Andrade Peregrino Anselmo Pedro Arispe Juan Arremón Venancio Bartibás Fausto Batignani René Borjas Antonio Campolo Adhemar Canavesi Héctor Castro Pedro Cea Lorenzo Fernández Roberto Figueroa Álvaro Gestido Andrés Mazali Ángel Melogno José Nasazzi Pedro Petrone Juan Piriz Héctor Scarone Domingo Tejera Santos Urdinarán	(Netherlands) 1928 Amsterdam	Football	Men's competition
Bronze	Guillermo Douglas	(United States) 1932 Los Angeles	Rowing	Men's single sculls
Silver	Eduardo Risso	(United Kingdom) 1948 London	Rowing	Men's single sculls
Bronze	William Jones; Juan Rodríguez	(United Kingdom) 1948 London	Rowing	Men's double sculls
Bronze	Basketball team: Martín Acosta y Lara Enrique Baliño Victorio Cieslinskas Héctor Costa Nelson Demarco Héctor García Otero Tabaré Larre Borges Adesio Lombardo Roberto Lovera Sergio Matto Wilfredo Peláez Carlos Roselló	(Finland) 1952 Helsinki	Basketball	Men's competition
Bronze	Miguel Seijas; Juan Rodríguez	(Finland) 1952 Helsinki	Rowing	Men's double sculls
Bronze	Basketball team: Carlos Blixen Ramiro Cortés Héctor Costa Nelson Chelle Nelson Demarco Héctor García Carlos González Sergio Matto Oscar Moglia Raúl Mera Ariel Olascoaga Milton Scaron	(Australia) 1956 Melbourne	Basketball	Men's competition
Bronze	Washington Rodríguez	(Japan) 1964 Tokyo	Boxing	Men's bantamweight
Silver	Milton Wynants	(Australia) 2000 Sydney	Cycling	Men's points race

== See also ==
- List of flag bearers for Uruguay at the Olympics
- Category:Olympic competitors for Uruguay
- Uruguay at the Paralympics
