= Uruguay at the 1952 Summer Olympics =

- IOC code: URU
- NOC: Uruguayan Olympic Committee

in Helsinki
- Competitors: 32 (31 men and 1 woman) in 9 sports
- Medals Ranked 37th: Gold 0 Silver 0 Bronze 2 Total 2

Summer Olympics appearances (overview)
- 1924; 1928; 1932; 1936; 1948; 1952; 1956; 1960; 1964; 1968; 1972; 1976; 1980; 1984; 1988; 1992; 1996; 2000; 2004; 2008; 2012; 2016; 2020; 2024

Uruguay competed at the 1952 Summer Olympics in Helsinki, Finland. 32 competitors, 31 men and 1 woman, took part in 17 events in 9 sports.

== Medalists ==
=== Bronze ===
- Sergio Matto, Wilfredo Pelaez, Carlos Roselló, Tabaré Larre, Adesio Lombardo, Roberto Lovera, Héctor Costa, Nelson Demarco, Héctor Garcia, Martín Acosta y Lara, Enrique Baliño, and Victorio Cieslinskas — Basketball, Men's Team Competition
- Juan Rodríguez and Miguel Seijas — Rowing, Men's Double Sculls

== Athletics ==
- Hércules Ascune
- Estrella Puente

== Basketball ==
Men's team competition

- Main Round (Group A)

- Defeated Czechoslovakia (53-51)
- Defeated Hungary (70-56)
- Lost to United States (44-57)

- Final Round (Group A)

- Lost to France (56-58)
- Defeated Bulgaria (62-54)
- Defeated Argentina (66-65)

- Semifinals

- Lost to Soviet Union (57-61)

- Bronze Medal Match

- Defeated Argentina (68-59) → Bronze Medal

- Team roster

- Martín Acosta y Lara
- Enrique Baliño
- Victorio Cieslinskas
- Héctor Costa
- Nelson Demarco
- Héctor García
- Tabaré Larre Borges
- Adesio Lombardo
- Roberto Lovera
- Sergio Matto
- Wilfredo Peláez
- Carlos Rosello

- Head coach: Olguiz Rodríguez

== Boxing ==
- Luis Albino Acuña
- Luis Sosa

== Cycling ==
Road Competition

Men's Individual Road Race (190.4 km)

- Virgilio Pereyra — 5:22:33.4 (→ 33rd place)
- Luis Angel de los Santos — 5:22:34.4 (→ 38th place)
- Mario Machado — 5:23:33.7 (→ 39th place)
- Julio Sobrera — did not finish (→ no ranking)

Track Competition

Men's 1.000m Time Trial

- Luis Angel de los Santos

- Final — 1:17.0 (→ 19th place)

- Juan de Armas
- Atilio Francois
- Luis Pedro Serra

== Fencing ==
Two fencers, both men, represented Uruguay in 1952.

Men's foil

- Sergio Iesi
- Ricardo Rimini

== Modern pentathlon ==
Three male pentathletes represented Uruguay in 1952.

Individual

- Américo González
- Alberto Ortíz
- Lem Martínez

Team

- Alberto Ortíz
- Lem Martínez
- Américo González

== Rowing ==
Uruguay had three male rowers participate in two out of seven rowing events in 1952.

Men's single sculls

- Eduardo Risso

Men's double sculls

- Miguel Seijas
- Juan Rodríguez

== Sailing ==
- Eugenio Lauz Santurio

== Swimming ==
Men

Ranks given are within the heat.

Athlete	Event	Heat		Semifinal		Final	
Athlete	Event	Time	Rank	Time	Rank	Time	Rank
Eduardo Priggione	400 m freestyle	5:12.1	4	Did not advance			
Eduardo Priggione	1500 m freestyle	21:11.9	7	—N/a		Did not advance	
