= Telegdy =

Telegdy or Telegdi is a Hungarian surname. Notable people with the surname include:

Telegdy

- Ádám Telegdy (born 1995), Hungarian swimmer
- György Telegdy (born 1927), Hungarian basketball player
- István Telegdy (1927–2013), Hungarian sailor and trainer
- János Telegdy (1575–1647), Hungarian Roman Catholic prelate

Telegdi

- Andrew Telegdi (1946-2017), Canadian politician
- Catherine Telegdi (1492-1547), Hungarian noblewoman
- Csanád Telegdi (d. 1349), Hungarian prelate
- Thomas Telegdi (d. 1375), Hungarian prelate
- Valentine Telegdi (1922-2006), Hungarian-American physicist
