= Woody Campbell =

Woody Campbell may refer to:

- Woody Campbell (basketball)
- Woody Campbell (American football)
