= Helsinki Art Museum =

- Helsingin taidemuseo Helsingfors konstmuseum
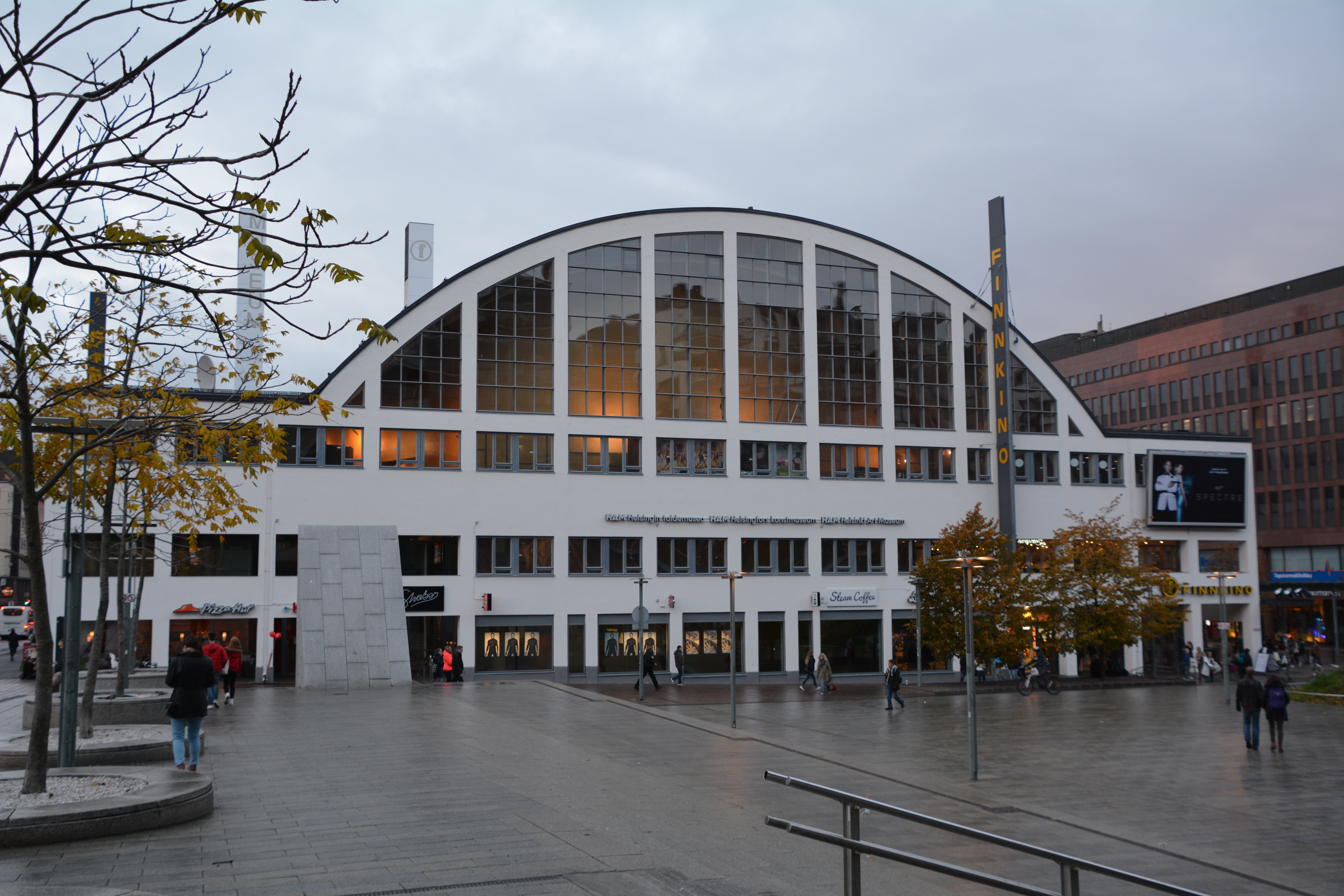
- HAM is located in Tennispalatsi

- The location of the museum in Helsinki
- Established: 1968
- Location: Eteläinen Rautatiekatu 8, Kamppi, Helsinki, Finland
- Coordinates: 60.16949°N 24.93123°E
- Type: Art museum
- Director: Maija Tanninen-Mattila
- Owner: Helsinki
- Website: www.hamhelsinki.fi/en/

Helsinki Art Museum (Finnish: Helsingin taidemuseo, Swedish: Helsingfors konstmuseum), abbreviated as HAM, is an art museum in Helsinki, Finland. It is located in Tennispalatsi in the district of Kamppi. The museum reopened after renovations and rebranding (as HAM) in 2015.

The museum is owned and operated by the city of Helsinki. It looks after the city's art collection, containing over 10,000 works. A quarter of the works are on display in public places such as parks, streets, schools and libraries.

The art museum hosts a small permanent exhibition of the works of Tove Jansson, including two large frescoes originally created for the restaurant of Helsinki City Hall.

From 2013 to 2023, HAM was directed by Maija Tanninen-Mattila. Since 2023, Arja Miller has been serving as the museum director.

== Art collection and exhibitions ==
HAM manages the city's extensive art collection, comprising over 10,000 works, mainly featuring 20th- and 21st-century Finnish art, as well as selected international pieces. Approximately 2,500 artworks are installed throughout the city in public places such as parks, streets, schools, libraries, and daycare centers.

HAM regularly curates both permanent and temporary exhibitions, and is responsible for significant public art installations citywide. Among its permanent displays is the extensive exhibition of Tove Jansson's works, including the two large frescoes "Party in the City" and "Party in the Countryside," originally painted for the Helsinki City Hall restaurant.

HAM also serves as a venue for large-scale events such as the Helsinki Biennial, an international exhibition of contemporary art held biennially across multiple venues including Vallisaari Island, Esplanade Park, and Helsinki Art Museum’s Tennis Palace premises.

== See also ==
- Finnish National Gallery
  - Ateneum
  - Kiasma
  - Sinebrychoff Art Museum
- Amos Anderson Art Museum
