= Red Curren =

Canadian basketball player

James Edward "Red" Curren (May 12, 1925 – November 13, 2010) was a Canadian basketball player who competed in the 1952 Summer Olympics. He was part of the Canadian basketball team, which was eliminated after the group stage in the 1952 tournament. He played one match.
