= Juan Gazsó =

Serbian-born Argentine basketball player

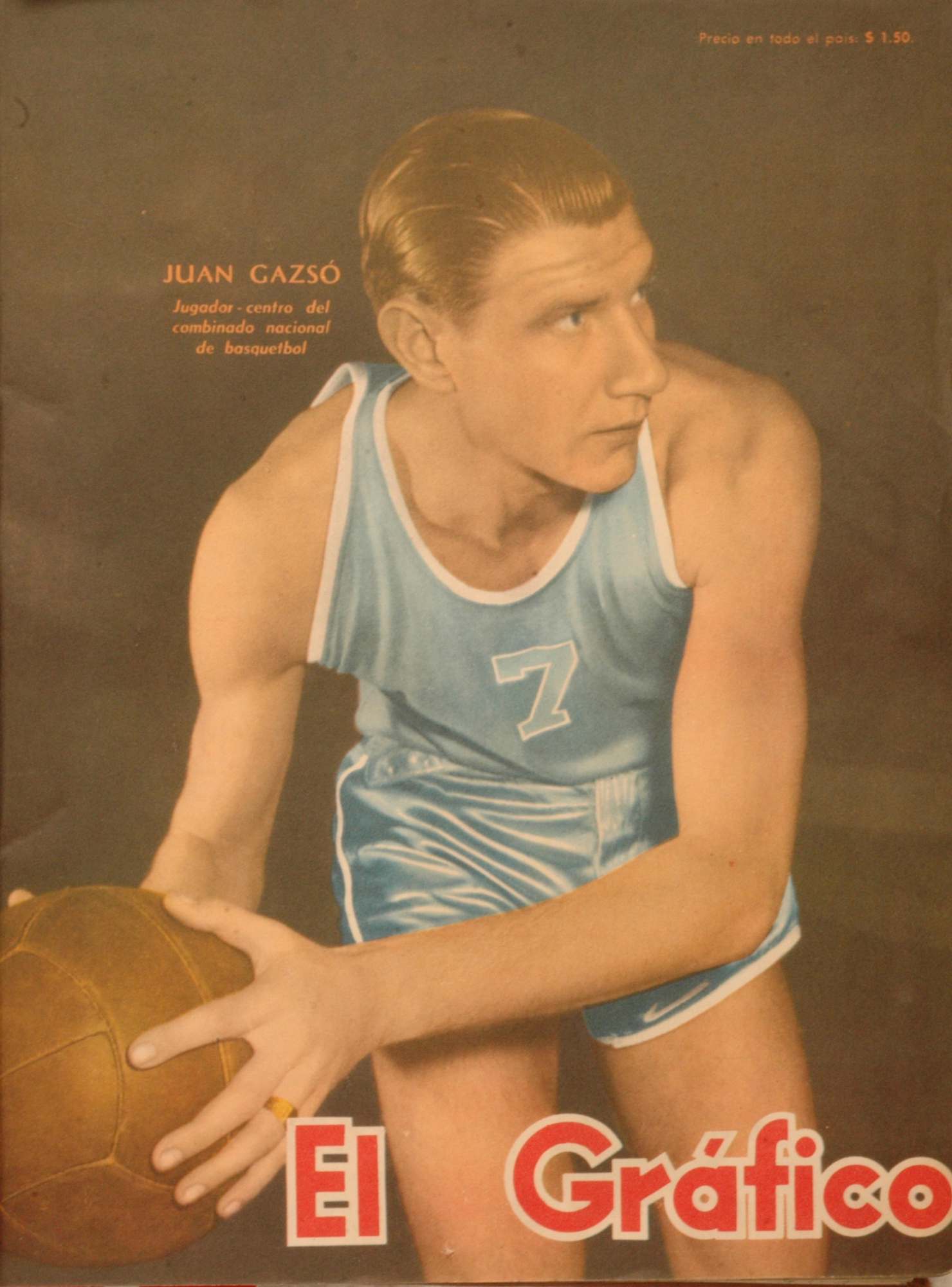
- Gazsó in El Gráfico, 1952

Personal information
- Born: 19 November 1922 Telečka
- Died: 15 September 2003 (aged 80) Córdoba, Argentina
- Listed height: 195 cm (6 ft 5 in)
Medals
Men's basketball
Representing Argentina
Pan American Games
Silver medal – second place	1955 Mexico City	Team

Juan Gazsó (born János Gazsó Horwath; 19 November 1922 – 15 September 2003) was a Serbian-born Argentine basketball player who competed in the 1952 Summer Olympics. He was born in Telečka, Zapadna Bačka, Serbia and died in Córdoba, Argentina.

Gazsó was of Hungarian descent and moved to Argentina at the age of 4. He retired from playing in 1965 after undergoing spinal surgery and later coached at Club San Andrés.
