= Glen Pettinger =

Canadian basketball player (1928–2019)

Glen Murray Pettinger (September 27, 1928 – October 12, 2019) was a Canadian basketball player who competed in the 1952 Summer Olympics. He was born in Toronto, Ontario. He was part of the Canadian basketball team, which was eliminated after the group stage in the 1952 tournament. He played all six matches. Pettinger played basketball for the University of Western Ontario Mustangs.
