= Tennispalatsi =

Cultural and recreational center in Kamppi, Finland

Coordinates: 60°10′11″N 024°55′49″E

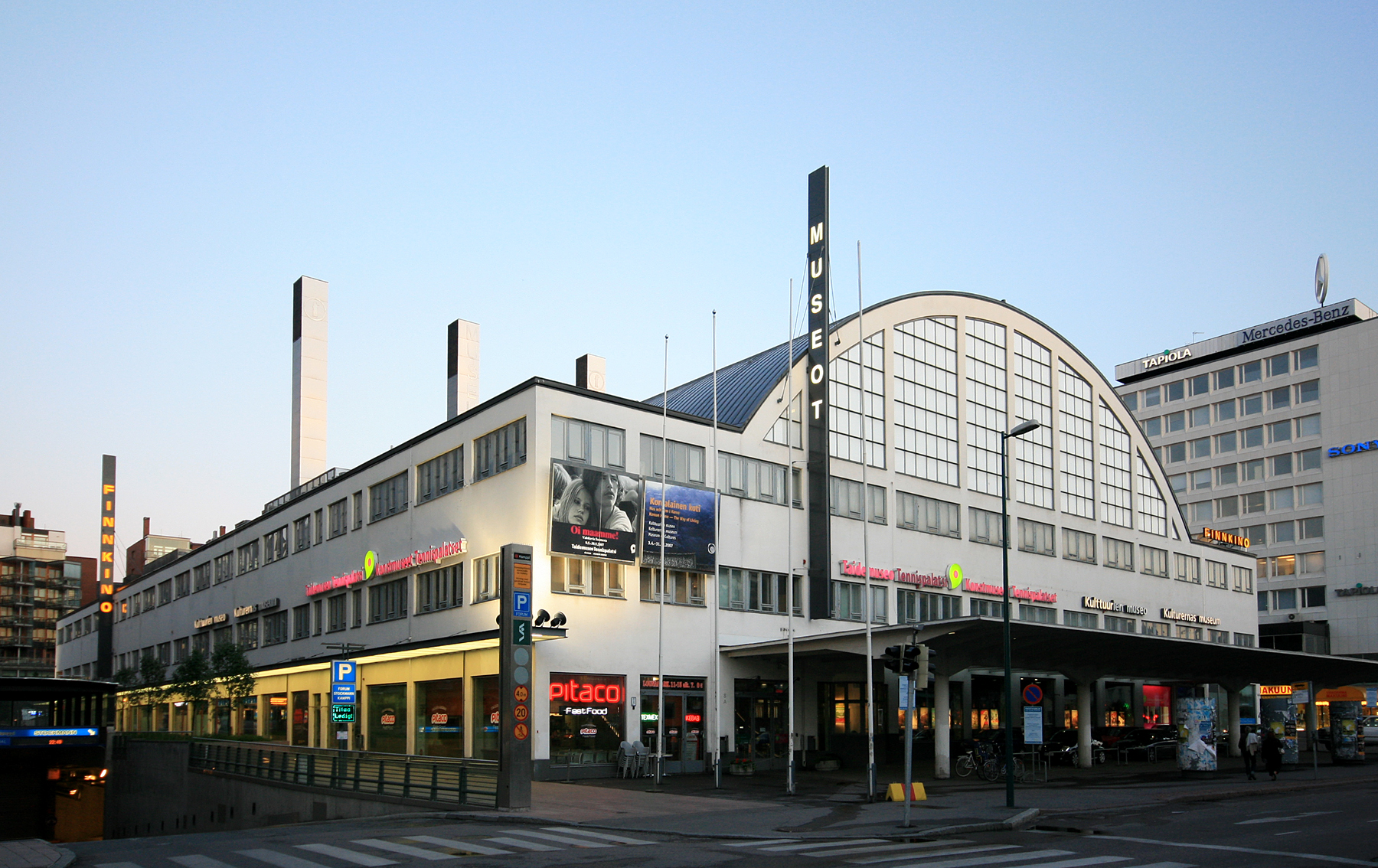
The building in 2007

Tennispalatsi (Swedish: Tennispalatset; lit. Tennis Palace) is an enclosed cultural and recreational center in Kamppi, Helsinki, Finland. It houses a Finnkino multiplex movie theatre, the Helsinki Art Museum, and small shops.

Tennispalatsi was built in 1938 in preparation for the 1940 Summer Olympics. The functionalist building, which had four tennis courts, was designed by Helge Lundström. In the 1952 Summer Olympics the basketball preliminary games were held in Tennispalatsi.

== Movie theatre complex ==
Finnkino has a 14-theatre multiplex in Tennispalatsi. It was opened on 26 February 1999. The theater sizes are from 92 to 703 seats. The largest theater has a screen of 184.8 square metres (1,989 sq ft) (8.8 m × 21 m or 29 ft × 69 ft). All the rooms use Dolby Digital, DTS and SDDS technologies. They also fulfill the THX standards although they are no longer THX certified after Finnkino quit paying the THX licensing fees in 2004; the THX logos no longer are used in Tennispalatsi or Finnkino's marketing.

Tennispalatsi is one of the two big Finnkino movie theatre multiplexes in Helsinki, along with Kinopalatsi. According to Finnkino, it was the world's first movie theatre to utilize THX and SDDS in all its auditoriums.
