= George Wearring =

Canadian basketball player

George Arthur Wearring (June 5, 1928 – March 3, 2013) was a Canadian basketball player who competed in the 1952 Summer Olympics. He was born in London, Ontario.

== Career ==
He was part of the Canadian basketball team, which was eliminated after the group stage in the 1952 tournament. He played all six matches. Wearring was on the University of Western Ontario basketball team.
