= Bill Pataky =

Canadian basketball player

Personal information
- Born: May 12, 1930 Windsor, Ontario
- Died: June 24, 2004 (aged 74) Sarnia, Ontario

William Andrew Pataky (May 12, 1930 – June 24, 2004) was a Canadian basketball player who competed in the 1952 Summer Olympics.

Born in Windsor, Ontario, he was part of the Canadian basketball team, which was eliminated after the group stage in the 1952 tournament. He played all six matches. Pataky attended the University of Western Ontario and graduated from the University of Windsor in 1957.
