= Roberto Viau =

Argentine basketball player

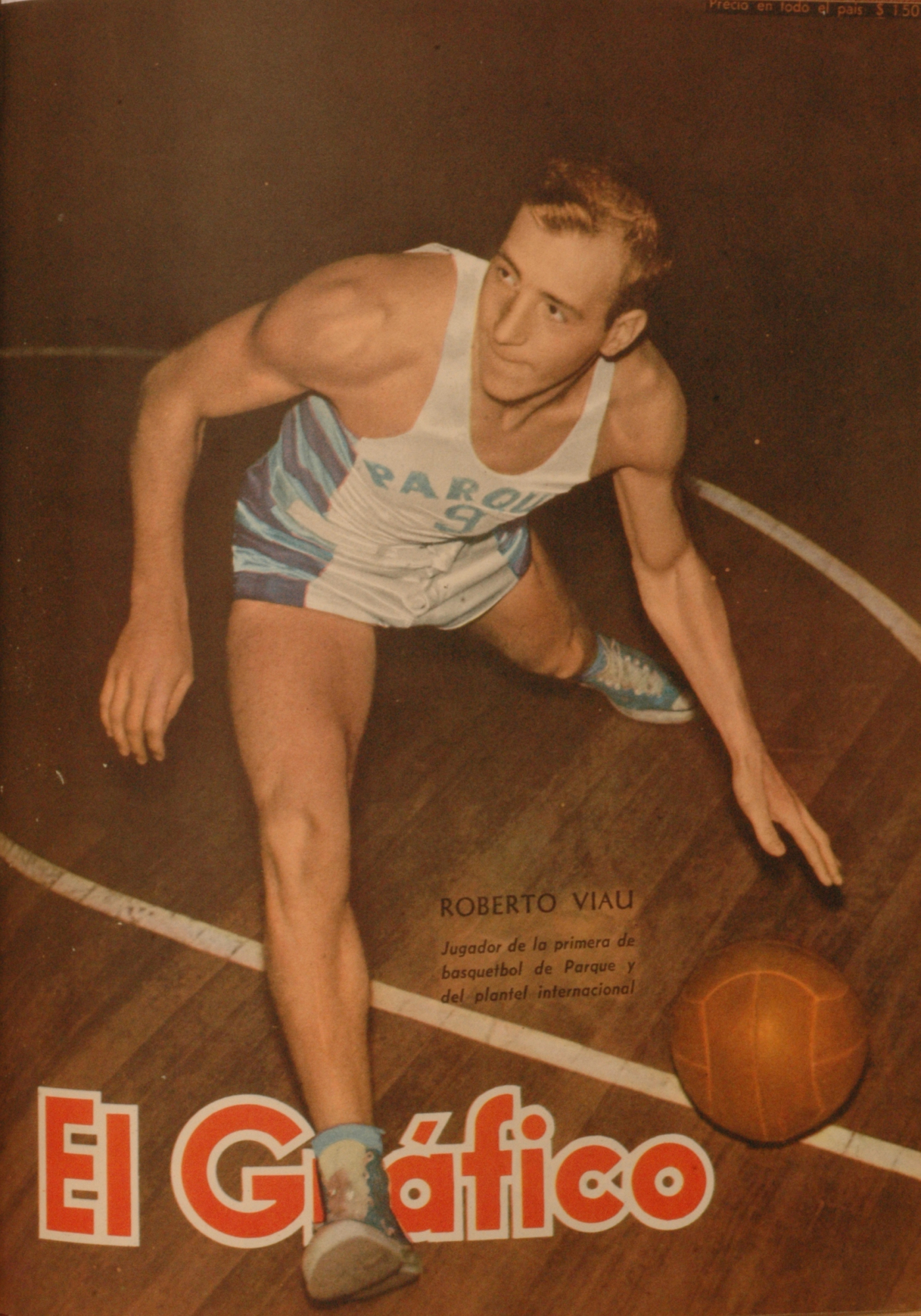
- Viau in El Gráfico, 1952

Personal information
- Born: 16 November 1931 Buenos Aires, Argentina
- Died: 6 June 1971 (aged 39)
Medals
Men's basketball
Representing Argentina
World Championship
Gold medal – first place	1950 Buenos Aires	Team
Pan American Games
Silver medal – second place	1951 Buenos Aires	Team
Silver medal – second place	1955 Mexico City	Team

Roberto Luis Viau (16 November 1931 – 6 June 1971) was an Argentine basketball player, who competed at the 1952 Summer Olympics. He was a member of the basketball team which finished fourth. He played all eight games in the 1952 tournament.
