= Telečka =

Telečka Телечка (Serbian) Bácsgyulafalva (Hungarian)
- Village (Selo)
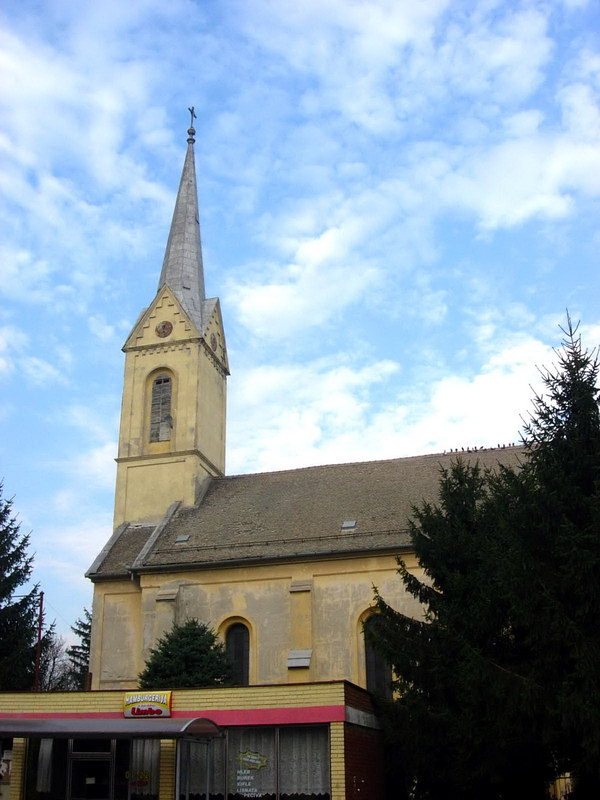
- The Saint Mary Catholic Church.

- Location within Vojvodina Location within Serbia Location within Europe
- Coordinates: 45°48′N 19°23′E
- Country: Serbia
- Province: Vojvodina
- Region: Bačka
- District: West Bačka
- Municipality: Sombor

Population (2002)
  - Total: 2,084
- Time zone: UTC+1 (CET)
  - Summer (DST): UTC+2 (CEST)

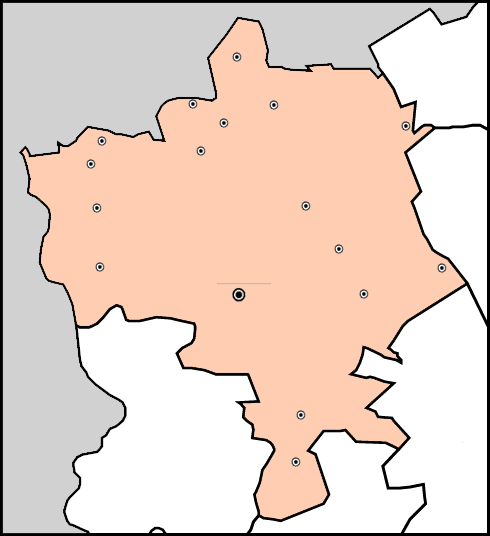

Telečka (Serbian Cyrillic: Телечка, Hungarian: Bácsgyulafalva) is a village in Serbia. It is in the Sombor municipality, in the West Bačka District, Vojvodina province. The village has a Hungarian ethnic majority and its population is 2,084 people (2002 census). It is surrounded by a sandy region, also referred to as Telečka, or Telečka sands.

== History ==
Settlement was built in 1883-1884 by Hungarian colonists. First census was conducted in 1890 and it recorded population of 2,479 inhabitants. Before the First World War this village was part of Bács-Bodrog County (Kingdom of Hungary, Austria-Hungary). Since 1918, it is part of the Kingdom of Serbs, Croats and Slovenes (later renamed to Yugoslavia). Today, the village has a Hungarian ethnic majority with more than 70% of the population.

== Ethnic groups (2002 census) ==
- Hungarians = 1,508 (72.36%)
- Serbs = 429 (20.59%)
- Romani = 37 (1.78%)
- Yugoslavs = 23 (1.10%)
- Croats = 13 (0.62%)
- others.

== Historical population ==
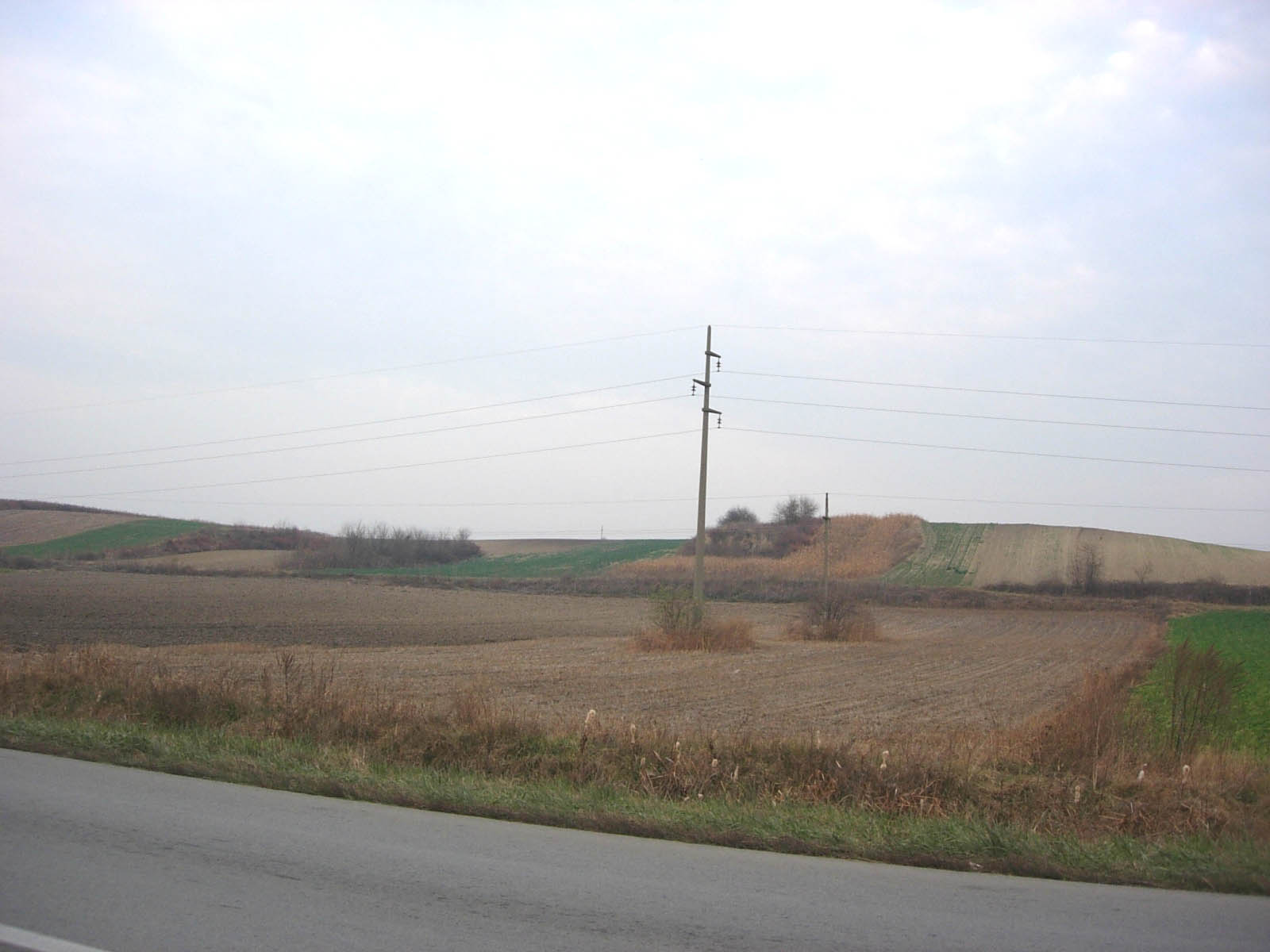
Telečka sands

- 1961: 2,996
- 1971: 2,665
- 1981: 2,429
- 1991: 2,138

== See also ==
- List of places in Serbia
- List of cities, towns and villages in Vojvodina
