= Bob Phibbs =

Canadian basketball player

Robert James Phibbs (May 26, 1927 – March 15, 2018) was a Canadian basketball player who competed in the 1952 Summer Olympics. He was born in Windsor, Ontario. He was part of the Canadian basketball team, which was eliminated after the group stage in the 1952 tournament. He played all six matches. Phibbs was on the University of Western Ontario basketball team.
