= Harry Wade =

Canadian basketball player

Harry Arthur Wade (March 12, 1928 – July 10, 2016) was a Canadian basketball player, from Windsor, Ontario, who competed in the 1952 Summer Olympics.

He was part of the Canadian basketball team, which was eliminated after the group stage in the 1952 tournament. He played all six matches.

Wade was on the University of Western Ontario Mustangs basketball team.

Wade died on July 10, 2016. He was 88.
