= Bob Kenney =

American basketball player

Medal record

Men's basketball

Representing the United States

Olympic Games
Gold medal – first place	1952 Helsinki	Team competition

Pan American Games
Gold medal – first place	1955 Mexico City	Team competition

Robert Earl Kenney (June 23, 1931 – October 27, 2014) was an All-State basketball player at Winfield High School in Winfield, Kansas as well as an American basketball player who competed in the Basketball at the 1952 Summer Olympics. He was part of the American basketball team, which won the gold medal in seven matches. Prior to that, he played for the University of Kansas team.

In 1999, Kenney was inducted into the Kansas Sports Hall of Fame
