= Jules Boes =

Belgian basketball player

Personal information
- Nationality: Belgian
- Born: 7 May 1927; Sint-Amandsberg, Belgium
- Died: 6 February 2016 (aged 88); Ghent, Belgium

Sport
- Sport: Basketball

Jules Boes (7 May 1927 – 6 February 2016) was a Belgian basketball player. He competed in the men's tournament at the 1952 Summer Olympics.
