= Eliahu Amiel =

Israeli basketball player

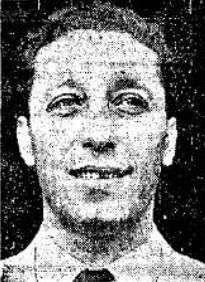
- Eliyahu Amiel, 1959

Personal information
- Native name: אליהו עמיאל
- Nationality: Israeli
- Born: 13 June 1925; Alexandria, Egypt
- Died: 11 August 2001 (aged 76)

Sport
- Sport: Basketball

Eliahu Amiel (Hebrew: אליהו עמיאל; 13 June 1925 – 11 August 2001) was an Israeli basketball player. He competed in the men's tournament at the 1952 Summer Olympics.
