= Jiří Matoušek (basketball) =

Czech basketball player

Personal information
- Nationality: Czech
- Born: 16 August 1927; Dvůr Králové nad Labem, Czechoslovakia
- Died: 14 March 2012 (aged 84)

Sport
- Sport: Basketball

Jiří Matoušek (16 August 1927 – 14 March 2012) was a Czech basketball player. He competed in the men's tournament at the 1952 Summer Olympics.
