= Dean Kelley =

American basketball player (1931–1996)

Medal record

Men's basketball

Representing the United States

Summer Olympics
Gold medal – first place	1952 Helsinki	Team competition

Pan American Games
Gold medal – first place	1955 Mexico City	

Melvin Dean Kelley (September 23, 1931 – January 13, 1996) was an American basketball player who competed in the 1952 Summer Olympics.

He was part of the American basketball team, which won the gold medal. He played six matches.

He later played three seasons for the Peoria Cats from (1956–59) Amateur Athletic Union (AAU) team, winning a championship there in 1958.

He was the brother of 1960 Summer Olympics gold medalist Allen Kelley.
