= Alberto Escoto =

Cuban basketball player (1925–2019)

Personal information
- Full name: Alberto Escoto Valdés
- Born: 27 August 1925 Havana, Cuba
- Died: 10 December 2019 (aged 94) Guaynabo, Puerto Rico

Sport
- Sport: Basketball

Alberto Escoto Valdés (27 August 1925 – 10 December 2019) was a Cuban basketball player. He competed in the men's tournament at the 1952 Summer Olympics. Escoto died in Guaynabo, Puerto Rico on 10 December 2019, at the age of 94.
