= Hugo Fernández (basketball) =

Chilean basketball player (1930–2024)

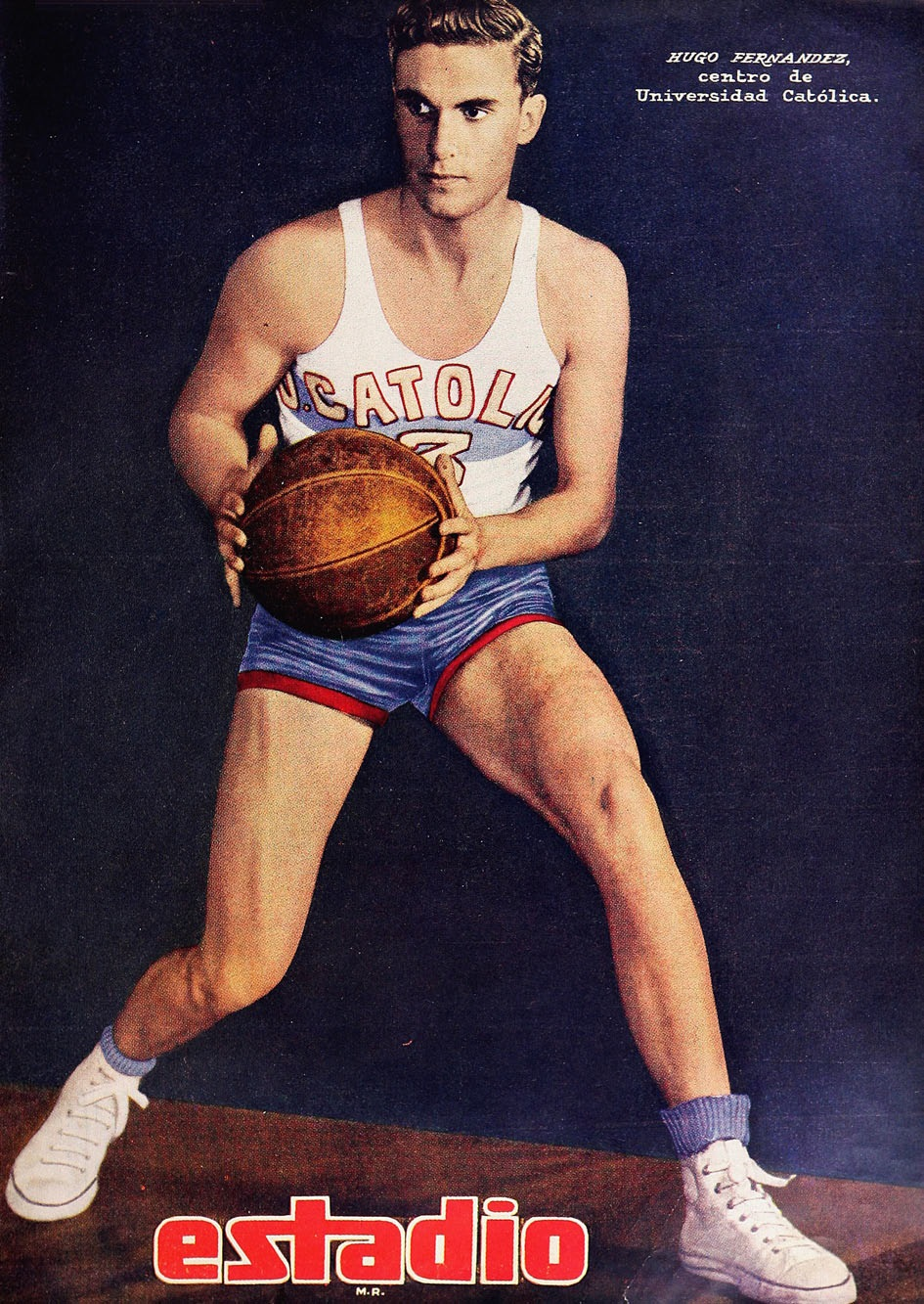

Personal information
- Born: 8 September 1930 Lautaro, Chile
- Died: 18 March 2024 (aged 93) Santiago, Chile

Sport
- Sport: Basketball

Hugo Simón Fernández Díez (8 September 1930 – 18 March 2024) was a Chilean basketball player. He competed in the men's tournament at the 1952 Summer Olympics. He died on 18 March 2023, at the age of 93.
