= Tião (basketball) =

Brazilian basketball player (1925–1989)

Sebastião Amorim Gimenez (31 May 1925 – 27 October 1989), also commonly known as Tião, was a Brazilian basketball player who competed in the 1952 Summer Olympics. He died in Santos, São Paulo on 27 October 1989, at the age of 64.
