= André Chavet =

French basketball player

Personal information
- Nationality: French
- Born: 13 July 1930; Saint-Étienne, France
- Died: 6 June 2005 (aged 74)

Sport
- Sport: Basketball

André Chavet (13 July 1930 – 6 June 2005) was a French basketball player. He competed in the men's tournament at the 1952 Summer Olympics.
