= Juhani Kyöstilä =

Finnish basketball player (1931–2010)

Personal information
- Nationality: Finnish
- Born: 4 July 1931; Helsinki, Finland
- Died: 30 June 2010 (aged 78); Kouvola, Finland

Sport
- Sport: Basketball

Juhani Kyöstilä (4 July 1931 – 30 June 2010) was a Finnish basketball player. He competed in the men's tournament at the 1952 Summer Olympics.
