= Bernard Pickel =

Canadian basketball player

Bernard Pickell
Personal information
- Nationality: Canadian
- Born: 2 July 1927; Kaunas, Lithuania
- Died: 8 August 1986 (aged 59); Toronto, Ontario, Canada

Sport
- Sport: Basketball

Bernard A. (Bob) Pickell (2 July 1927 – 8 August 1986) was a Canadian basketball player. He competed in the men's tournament at the 1952 Summer Olympics and the 1956 Summer Olympics. He died of cancer in 1986.
