= Johannes Ducheyne =

Belgian basketball player

Personal information
- Nationality: Belgian
- Born: 14 November 1933 (age 91)

Sport
- Sport: Basketball

Johannes Ducheyne (born 14 November 1933) is a Belgian basketball player. He competed in the men's tournament at the 1952 Summer Olympics.
