= Sergio Marelli =

Italian basketball player (1926–2006)

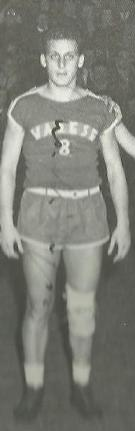
- Marelli in 1952

Personal information
- Nationality: Italian
- Born: 24 May 1926; Varese, Italy
- Died: 22 July 2006 (aged 80); Varese, Italy

Sport
- Sport: Basketball

Sergio Marelli (24 May 1926 – 22 July 2006) was an Italian basketball player. He competed in the men's tournament at the 1952 Summer Olympics.
