= Eric Mahn =

Chilean basketball player

Personal information
- Born: 1 June 1925 Talcahuano, Chile
- Died: 15 December 2000 (aged 75)

Sport
- Sport: Basketball

Eric Mahn Godoy (1 June 1925 – 15 December 2000) was a Chilean basketball player. He competed in the men's tournament at the 1952 Summer Olympics.
