= Veselin Penkov =

Bulgarian basketball player

Personal information
- Nationality: Bulgarian
- Born: 1 January 1932

Sport
- Sport: Basketball

Veselin Ivanov Penkov (Bulgarian: Веселин Иванов Пенков; born 1 January 1932) is a Bulgarian former basketball player. He competed in the men's tournament at the 1952 Summer Olympics.
