= Bernard Schmied =

Swiss basketball player (1933–2024)

Personal information
- Nationality: Swiss
- Born: 1933
- Died: 11 February 2024 (aged 90)

Sport
- Sport: Basketball

Bernard Schmied (1933 – 11 February 2024) was a Swiss basketball player. He competed in the men's tournament at the 1952 Summer Olympics in Helsinki. Schmied died on 11 February 2024, at the age of 90.
