= Roger Domenjoz =

Swiss basketball player (1923–1991)

Personal information
- Full name: Roger Ernest Domenjoz
- Nationality: Swiss
- Born: 23 May 1923 Lucens, Switzerland
- Died: 2 October 1991 (aged 68)

Sport
- Sport: Basketball

Roger Ernest Domenjoz (23 May 1923 – 2 October 1991) was a Swiss basketball player. He competed in the men's tournament at the 1952 Summer Olympics. Domenjoz died on 2 October 1991, at the age of 68.
