= Pioquinto Soto =

Mexican basketball player (1915–1982)

Personal information
- Born: 15 July 1915 Dolores Hidalgo, Mexico
- Died: 5 June 1982 (aged 66) Mexico City

Sport
- Sport: Basketball

Enrique Píoquinto Soto Villanueva (15 July 1915 – 5 June 1982) was a Mexican basketball player. He competed in the men's tournament at the 1952 Summer Olympics.
