= Carlos Bru =

Mexican basketball player (1928–2016)

José Bru
Personal information
- Full name: José Carlos Bru Villarreal
- Nationality: Mexican
- Born: 9 June 1928; New York City, New York, U.S.
- Died: 7 March 2016 (aged 87); Mexico City, Mexico

Sport
- Sport: Basketball

José Carlos Bru Villarreal (9 June 1928 – 7 March 2016) was a Mexican basketball player. He competed in the men's tournament at the 1952 Summer Olympics. Bru died in Mexico City on 7 March 2016, at the age of 87.
