= Sergio Holguín =

Mexican basketball player

Personal information
- Full name: Sergio Pedro Holguín Fierro
- Born: 15 April 1929; Ciudad Juárez, Mexico
- Died: Before 2013

Sport
- Sport: Basketball

Sergio Holguín Fierro (15 April 1929 – before 2013) was a Mexican basketball player. He competed in the men's tournament at the 1952 Summer Olympics.
