= Gheorghe Constantinide =

Romanian basketball player

Gheorghe Constantinide (November 13, 1928 – October 14, 2003) was a Romanian basketball player who competed in the 1952 Summer Olympics.
