= Woody Campbell (basketball) =

Canadian basketball player

Ralph "Woody" Woodrow Campbell (January 31, 1925 – November 2004) was a Canadian basketball player who competed in the 1952 Summer Olympics.

Campbell was part of the Canadian basketball team, which was eliminated after the group stage in the 1952 tournament. He played all six matches.
