= Roger Prahin =

Swiss basketball player

Personal information
- Nationality: Swiss
- Born: 16 October 1923
- Died: 25 February 2010 (aged 86)

Sport
- Sport: Basketball

Roger Prahin (16 October 1923 – 25 February 2010) was a Swiss basketball player. He competed in the men's tournament at the 1952 Summer Olympics.
