= Marcel Moget =

Swiss basketball player (1931–2018)

Personal information
- Full name: Marcel Nicolas Moget
- Nationality: Swiss
- Born: 23 April 1931
- Died: December 2018 (aged 87)

Sport
- Sport: Basketball

Marcel Nicolas Moget ( 23 April 1931 - December 2018) was a Swiss basketball player. He competed in the men's tournament at the 1952 Summer Olympics.
