= Armando Estrada (basketball) =

Cuban basketball player

Personal information
- Nationality: Cuban
- Born: 28 January 1930 (age 95)

Sport
- Sport: Basketball

Armando Estrada (born 28 January 1930) is a Cuban basketball player. He competed in the men's tournament at the 1952 Summer Olympics.
