= Raymond Sabounghi =

Egyptian basketball player

Personal information
- Full name: Raymond Fahmy Sabounghi
- Nationality: Egyptian
- Born: 23 October 1931 Alexandria, Egypt
- Died: 20 December 2002 (aged 71) Queens, New York, United States

Sport
- Sport: Basketball
Medal record
Men's basketball
Representing Egypt
Mediterranean Games
Gold medal – first place	1951 Egypt

Raymond Sabounghi (Arabic: ريمون فهمي صابونجي; 23 October 1931 – 20 December 2002) was an Egyptian basketball player. He competed in the men's tournament at the 1952 Summer Olympics.
