= Félix Roosemont =

Belgian basketball player (1925–1991)

Personal information
- Full name: Félix André Roosemont
- Nationality: Belgian
- Born: 14 May 1925 Brussels, Belgium
- Died: 3 May 1991 (aged 65) Anderlecht, Belgium

Sport
- Sport: Basketball

Félix André Roosemont (14 May 1925 – 3 May 1991) was a Belgian basketball player. He competed in the men's tournament at the 1952 Summer Olympics. Roosemont died in Anderlecht on 3 May 1991, at the age of 65.
