= José Meneses (basketball) =

Mexican basketball player (1924–2013)

Personal information
- Born: 11 January 1924 Chihuahua, Mexico
- Died: 24 April 2013 (aged 89) Chihuahua, Mexico

Sport
- Sport: Basketball

José Meneses (11 January 1924 – 24 April 2013) was a Mexican basketball player. He competed in the men's tournament at the 1952 Summer Olympics.
