= Felipe de la Pozas =

Cuban basketball player (1933–2025)

Personal information
- Nationality: Cuban
- Born: 28 August 1933
- Died: 30 July 2025 (aged 91)

Sport
- Sport: Basketball

Felipe de la Pozas (28 August 1933 – 30 July 2025) was a Cuban basketball player. He competed in the men's tournament at the 1952 Summer Olympics.
