= Rolando Rubalcava =

Mexican basketball player (1923–1996)

Personal information
- Nationality: Mexican
- Born: 22 July 1923
- Died: 15 October 1996 (aged 73)

Sport
- Sport: Basketball

Rolando Rubalcava (22 July 1923 – 15 October 1996) was a Mexican basketball player. He competed in the men's tournament at the 1952 Summer Olympics.
