= George Chalhoub =

Egyptian basketball player

Personal information
- Full name: George Jean Chalhoub
- Nationality: Egyptian
- Born: 28 August 1931 Alexandria, Egypt
- Died: 15 January 2014 (aged 82) Alexandria, Egypt

Sport
- Sport: Basketball
Medal record
Men's basketball
Representing United Arab Republic
Mediterranean Games
Bronze medal – third place	1959 Lebanon

George Chalhoub (Arabic: جورج جان شلهوب; 28 August 1931 – 15 January 2014) was an Egyptian basketball player. He competed in the men's tournament at the 1952 Summer Olympics.
