= Henri Crick =

Belgian basketball player

Personal information
- Nationality: Belgian
- Born: 22 July 1932
- Died: November 2026 (aged 94)

Sport
- Sport: Basketball

Henri Crick (22 July 1932 – November 2026) was a Belgian basketball player. He competed in the men's tournament at the 1952 Summer Olympics.
