= Josef du Jardin =

Belgian basketball player (born 1934)

Personal information
- Full name: Josef Jan du Jardin
- Nationality: Belgian
- Born: 9 June 1934 (age 90); Antwerp, Belgium

Sport
- Sport: Basketball

Josef Jan du Jardin (born 9 June 1934) is a Belgian basketball player. He competed in the men's tournament at the 1952 Summer Olympics.
