= Filiberto Manzo =

Mexican basketball player

Personal information
- Nationality: Mexican
- Born: 29 April 1930
- Died: 20 May 1996 (aged 66)

Sport
- Sport: Basketball

Filiberto Manzo (29 April 1930 – 20 May 1996) was a Mexican basketball player. He competed in the men's tournament at the 1952 Summer Olympics.
