= Jan Ceulemans (basketball) =

Belgian basketball player (1926–2022)

Personal information
- Nationality: Belgian
- Born: 11 January 1926; Vilvoorde, Belgium
- Died: 21 April 2022 (aged 96)

Sport
- Sport: Basketball

Jan Ceulemans (11 January 1926 – 21 April 2022) was a Belgian basketball player. He competed in the men's tournament at the 1952 Summer Olympics. Ceulemans died on 21 April 2022, at the age of 96.
