= Robert Crost =

French basketball player (1924–1991)

Jean-Roger "Robert" Crost
Personal information
- Nationality: French
- Born: 31 December 1924
- Died: 1991

Sport
- Sport: Basketball

Jean-Roger "Robert" Crost (31 December 1924 – 1991) was a French basketball player. He competed in the men's tournament at the 1952 Summer Olympics.
