= José Gochangco =

Filipino basketball player

Personal information
- Born: February 19, 1926
- Died: January 23, 2008 (aged 81) Vallejo, California, U.S.
Medals
Men's basketball
Representing Philippines
Asian Games
Gold medal – first place	1951 New Delhi	Team

José Punzalan Gochangco (February 19, 1926 – January 23, 2008) was a Filipino basketball player who competed in the 1952 Summer Olympics.
