= Giordano Damiani =

Italian basketball player (1930–1999)

Personal information
- Nationality: Italian
- Born: 27 June 1930; Trieste, Italy
- Died: 13 March 1999 (aged 68)

Sport
- Sport: Basketball

Giordano Damiani (27 June 1930 – 13 March 1999) was an Italian basketball player. He competed in the men's tournament at the 1952 Summer Olympics.
