= Miloslav Kodl =

Czech basketball player

Personal information
- Nationality: Czech
- Born: 12 August 1928
- Died: 3 December 1985 (aged 57)

Sport
- Sport: Basketball

Miloslav Kodl (12 August 1928 – 3 December 1985) was a Czech basketball player. He competed in the men's tournament at the 1952 Summer Olympics.
