= Raymundo Carvalho dos Santos =

Brazilian basketball player (1923–2011)

Raymundo Carvalho dos Santos (23 August 1923 – 26 December 2011) was a Brazilian basketball player who competed in the 1952 Summer Olympics. Santos died in Avaré, São Paulo on 26 December 2011, at the age of 88.
