= Nodar Dzhordzhikiya =

Soviet basketball player

Olympic medal record

Representing Soviet Union

Men's basketball

Olympic Games
Silver medal – second place	1952 Helsinki	Soviet Union

Nodar Dzhordzhikiya (or Nodar Jorjikia) (Georgian: ნოდარ ჯორჯიკია, Russian: Нодар Константинович Джорджикия; 15 November 1921 in Kutaisi – 1 June 2008) was a Soviet basketball player who competed for the Soviet Union in the 1952 Summer Olympics. He trained at Dynamo in Tbilisi.

Dzhordzhikiya was a member of the Soviet team which won the silver medal at the 1952 Games. He played in all eight matches.
