= Fabio Presca =

Italian basketball player (1930–2008)

Personal information
- Nationality: Italian
- Born: 4 December 1930 Trieste, Italy
- Died: 16 February 2008 (aged 77) Trieste, Italy

Sport
- Sport: Basketball

Fabio Presca (4 December 1930 – 16 February 2008) was an Italian basketball player. He competed in the men's tournament at the 1952 Summer Olympics.
