= György Telegdy =

Hungarian basketball player (1927–2022)

Personal information
- Nationality: Hungarian
- Born: 10 May 1927 Budapest, Hungary
- Died: 8 January 2022 (aged 94)

Sport
- Sport: Basketball

György Telegdy (10 May 1927 – 8 January 2022) was a Hungarian basketball player. He competed in the men's tournament at the 1952 Summer Olympics.
