= Wayne Glasgow =

American basketball player (1926–2000)

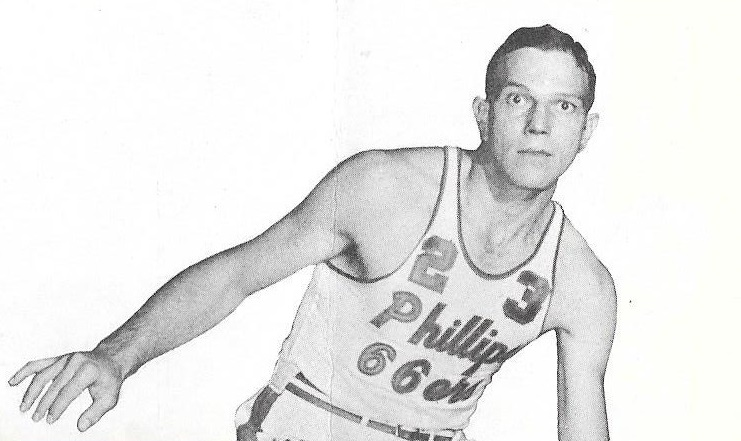
- Glasgow with the Phillips 66ers

Personal information
- Born: January 17, 1926 Dacoma, Oklahoma, U.S.
- Died: December 31, 2000 (aged 74) Bartlesville, Oklahoma, U.S.
- Listed height: 6 ft 3 in (1.91 m)
- Listed weight: 190 lb (86 kg)

Career information
- High school: Dacoma (Dacoma, Oklahoma)
- College: Northwestern Oklahoma State (1946–1947); Oklahoma (1948–1950)
- NBA draft: 1950: 6th round, 66th overall pick
- Drafted by: Minneapolis Lakers
- Position: Guard

Career history
- 1950–1954: Phillips 66ers

Career highlights
- 2× First-team All-Big Seven (1949, 1950)
- Stats at Basketball Reference
Medals
Men's basketball
Representing the United States
Gold medal – first place	1952 Helsinki	Team competition

Victor Wayne Glasgow (January 17, 1926 – December 31, 2000) was an American basketball player. He played in college for Oklahoma University where he was a two time All-Big Seven selection. Glasgow passed playing in the NBA to play for the Phillips Petroleum Co. 66er's AAU team.

He was part of the United States Olympic basketball team at the 1952 Summer Olympics which won the gold medal. He played in six games.
