= Carlos Roselló =

Uruguayan basketball player

Personal information
- Full name: Carlos Roselló Betbeze
- Born: May 2, 1922 Montevideo, Uruguay
- Died: before 2004
Medal record
Men's basketball
Representing Uruguay
Olympic Games
| Bronze medal – third place | 1952 Helsinki | Team competition |

Carlos Roselló Betbeze (May 2, 1922 – before 2004) was a Uruguayan basketball player who competed in the 1948 and the 1952 Summer Olympics. Rosello was part of the Uruguayan basketball team, which finished fifth in the 1948 tournament. Four years later Rosello was a member of the Uruguayan team, which won the bronze medal. He played four matches.
