= Roberto Lovera =

Uruguayan basketball player (1922–2016)

Personal information
- Born: November 14, 1922 Montevideo, Uruguay
- Died: 22 June 2016 (aged 93)
Medal record
Men's basketball
Representing Uruguay
Olympic Games
Bronze medal – third place	1952 Helsinki	Team competition

Roberto José Lovera Vidal (14 November 1922 – 22 June 2016) was a Uruguayan basketball player who competed in the 1948 Summer Olympics and in the 1952 Summer Olympics. Lovera was part of the Uruguayan basketball team, which finished fifth in the 1948 tournament. Four years later Lovera was a member of the Uruguayan team, which won the bronze medal. He played all eight matches.
