= Héctor García (basketball) =

Uruguayan basketball player (1926–1999)

Personal information
- Born: 12 June 1926 Montevideo, Uruguay
- Died: 20 August 1999 (aged 73) Montevideo, Uruguay
Medal record
Men's basketball
Representing Uruguay
Olympic Games
Bronze medal – third place	1952 Helsinki	Team competition
Bronze medal – third place	1956 Melbourne	Team Competition

Héctor García Otero (12 June 1926 – 20 August 1999) was a Uruguayan basketball player, who twice won the bronze medal with the men's national team at the Summer Olympics: in 1952 and 1956. García died in Montevideo on 20 August 1999, at the age of 73.
