= Martín Acosta y Lara =

Uruguayan basketball player (1925–2005)

Medal record

Men's basketball

Representing Uruguay

Olympic Games
Bronze medal – third place	1952 Helsinki	Team competition

Martín Raúl Acosta y Lara Díaz (25 March 1925 – 5 January 2005) was a Uruguayan basketball player who competed in the 1948 Summer Olympics and in the 1952 Summer Olympics.

He was born in Montevideo, Uruguay.

Acosta y Lara was part of the Uruguayan basketball team, which finished fifth in the 1948 tournament.

Four years later Acosta y Lara was a member of the Uruguayan team, which won the bronze medal. He played seven matches.

He died on 5 January 2005 in Mendoza, Argentina and is buried at Cementerio del Buceo, Montevideo.
