= Nelson Demarco =

Uruguayan basketball player (1925–2009)

Personal information
- Born: 6 February 1925 Montevideo, Uruguay
- Died: 22 July 2009 (aged 84)
Medal record
Men's basketball
Representing Uruguay
Olympic Games
| Bronze medal – third place | 1952 Helsinki | Team competition |
| Bronze medal – third place | 1956 Melbourne | Team Competition |

Nelson Walter "Fogata" Demarco Riccardi (6 February 1925 – 21 July 2009) was a basketball player from Uruguay, who competed in three Olympics. At the 1948 Summer Olympics, Demarco and team Uruguay placed 5th in the Olympics. Demarco won a bronze medal at both the 1952 Summer Olympics and the 1956 Summer Olympics.

His remains are buried at Cementerio del Norte, Montevideo.
