= Victorio Cieslinskas =

Uruguayan basketball player (1922–2007)

Personal information
- Born: October 27, 1922 Marijampolė, Lithuania
- Died: June 19, 2007 (aged 84) Montevideo, Uruguay
Medal record
Men's basketball
Representing Uruguay
Olympic Games
Bronze medal – third place	1952 Helsinki	Team competition

Victor Cieslinskas Zinevicaite (October 27, 1922 – June 19, 2007) was a Uruguayan basketball player of Lithuanian descent. He competed in the 1948 Summer Olympics and in the 1952 Summer Olympics.

Cieslinskas was part of the Uruguayan men's basketball team, which finished fifth in the 1948 tournament.

Four years later in 1952 Cieslinskas was a member of the Uruguayan team, which won the Olympic bronze medal. He played all eight matches.

He also played for the Uruguayan Lithuanian basketball team Vytis in Montevideo.

He died in 2007, and is buried at Cementerio del Norte, Montevideo.
