= Sergio Matto =

Uruguayan basketball player

Personal information
- Born: 13 October 1930 Las Piedras, Uruguay
- Died: 23 November 1990 (aged 60) Itajaí, Brazil
Medal record
Men's basketball
Representing Uruguay
Olympic Games
Bronze medal – third place	1952 Helsinki	Team competition
Bronze medal – third place	1956 Melbourne	Team Competition

Sergio Armando Matto Suárez (13 October 1930 – 23 November 1990) was a basketball player from Uruguay, who twice won the bronze medal with the men's national team at the Summer Olympics: in 1952 and 1956. He competed in three consecutive Olympics for his native country, starting in 1952 (Helsinki, Finland).
