= Wilfredo Peláez =

Uruguayan basketball player (1930–2019)

Personal information
- Born: 27 October 1930 San José de Mayo, Uruguay
- Died: 23 May 2019 (aged 88)
Medal record
Men's basketball
Representing Uruguay
Olympic Games
Bronze medal – third place	1952 Helsinki	Team competition

Wilfredo Andrés Peláez Esmite (27 October 1930 – 23 May 2019) was a Uruguayan basketball player who competed in the 1952 Summer Olympics. Pelaez was a member of the Uruguayan team, which won the bronze medal. He played four matches.
