= Adesio Lombardo =

Uruguayan basketball player

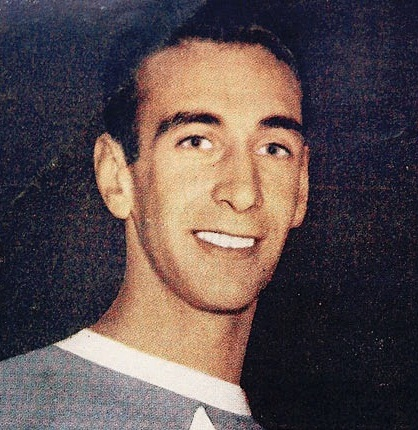

Personal information
- Full name: Adesio Rafael Lombardo Rossi
- Born: 2 February 1925 Montevideo, Uruguay
Medal record
Men's basketball
Representing Uruguay
Olympic Games
| Bronze medal – third place | 1952 Helsinki | Team competition |

Adesio Rafael Lombardo Rossi (2 February 1925 – before 2004) was a Uruguayan basketball player who competed in the 1948 Summer Olympics and in the 1952 Summer Olympics. Lombardo was part of the Uruguayan basketball team, which finished fifth in the 1948 tournament. Four years later Lombardo was a member of the Uruguayan team, which won the bronze medal. He played all eight matches.
