= Tabaré Borges =

Uruguayan basketball player

Personal information
- Born: 6 January 1922 Montevideo, Uruguay
Medal record
Men's basketball
Representing Uruguay
Olympic Games
Bronze medal – third place	1952 Helsinki	Team competition

Tabaré Larre Borges Gallarreta (born 6 January 1922, date of death unknown) was a Uruguayan basketball player who competed in the 1952 Summer Olympics. Borges was a member of the Uruguayan team, which won the bronze medal. He played all eight matches.
