= Turkey at the 1952 Summer Olympics =

- IOC code: TUR
- NOC: Turkish National Olympic Committee

in Helsinki
- Medals Ranked 16th: Gold 2 Silver 0 Bronze 1 Total 3

Summer Olympics appearances (overview)
- 1908; 1912; 1920; 1924; 1928; 1932; 1936; 1948; 1952; 1956; 1960; 1964; 1968; 1972; 1976; 1980; 1984; 1988; 1992; 1996; 2000; 2004; 2008; 2012; 2016; 2020; 2024; 2028

Other related appearances
- 1906 Intercalated Games

Turkey competed at the 1952 Summer Olympics in Helsinki, Finland.

== Medalists ==
Medal	Name	Sport	Event
Gold	Hasan Gemici	Wrestling	Men's Freestyle Flyweight
Gold	Bayram Şit	Wrestling	Men's Freestyle Featherweight
Bronze	Adil Atan	Wrestling	Men's Freestyle Light-Heavyweight

== Results by event ==
=== Basketball ===
==== Men's team competition ====
- Yüksel Alkan
- Altan Dinçer
- Nejat Diyarbakırlı
- Yalçın Granit
- Sadi Gülçelik
- Yılmaz Gündüz
- Erdoğan Partener
- Sacit Seldüz
- Turhan Tezol
- Güney Ülmen
- Ali Uras
- Mehmet Ali Yalım
- Qualification Round (Group C)

- Lost to Egypt (52-64)
- Lost to Italy (37-49) → did not advance, 22nd place

=== Wrestling ===
It was a moderately successful campaign for the 15 wrestlers from Turkey who participated in the 1952 Olympics winning 2 golds in their overall total of 3 medals. This however might look a bit disappointing comparing to their tremendous success in the previous edition at London in 1948 wherein 16 Turkish wrestlers secured 6 gold medals in a total tally of 11 medals. Amongst the gold medal winners for Turkey in 1952, Hasan Gemici retired only 3 years later in 1955 and became a coach. The other gold medal winner Bayram Sit however continued the sports and won a silver in 1954 World Championship before narrowly missing out on another medal in the next edition of the Olympics in 1956. The other medal winner was Adil Atan who won a bronze in light heavyweight freestyle. Although he never won another Olympics medal, he secured silver in World Championship at Tokyo in 1954 and then went on to win gold in the world cup competition in 1956 for Turkey in Istanbul.
