= Basketball at the 1951 Mediterranean Games =

The basketball tournament at the 1951 Mediterranean Games was held in Alexandria, Egypt.

== Participating teams ==
The following countries have participated for the final tournament:

Federation	Nation
FIBA Africa	Egypt (hosts)
FIBA Asia	Syria - Lebanon
FIBA Europe	Greece - Italy - Turkey - Spain

== Final tournament ==
All times local : CET (UTC+2)

	Team	Points	G	W	D	L	GF	GA	Diff
1.	Egypt	12	6	6	0	0	252	183	+69
2.	Spain	11	6	5	0	1	306	252	+54
3.	Italy	10	6	4	0	2	250	223	+27
4.	Greece	9	6	3	0	3	254	247	+7
5.	Lebanon	8	6	2	0	4	219	268	–49
6.	Turkey	7	6	1	0	5	220	225	–5
7.	Syria	6	6	0	0	6	207	310	–103

=== Matches ===
08 October
19:30

Syria	25–44	Italy
Scoring by half: 10–06, 15–38

08 October
21:00

Spain	48–39	Turkey
Scoring by half: 25–20, 23–19

09 October
19:30

Syria	45–50	Greece
Scoring by half: 17–23, 28–27

09 October
21:00

Egypt	47–33	Lebanon
Scoring by half: 18–12, 29–21

10 October
19:30

Spain	58–34	Lebanon
Scoring by half: 30–17, 28–17

10 October
21:00

Italy	38–36	Turkey
Scoring by half: 18–17, 20–19

11 October
19:30

Italy	47–35	Greece
Scoring by half: 23–09, 24–26

11 October
21:00

Egypt	61–30	Syria
Scoring by half: 27–19, 34–11

12 October
19:30

Greece	47–33	Lebanon
Scoring by half: 25–16, 22–17

12 October
21:00

Egypt	23–20	Turkey
Scoring by half: 09–12, 14–08

13 October
20:00

Spain	60–44	Syria
Scoring by half: 33–16, 27–28

14 October
19:30

Italy	50–34	Lebanon
Scoring by half: 16–16, 34–18

15 October
19:30

Lebanon	44–34	Syria
Scoring by half: 19-20, 25–14

15 October
21:00

Greece	43–37	Turkey
Scoring by half: 14-18, 29–19

16 October
19:30

Egypt	39–37	Greece
Scoring by half: 23-27, 16–10

16 October
21:00

Spain	52–47	Italy
Scoring by half: 23–25, 29–22

17 October
19:30

Lebanon	41–32	Turkey
Scoring by half: 18–14, 23–18

17 October
21:00

Egypt	41–24	Italy
Scoring by half: 21–15, 20–09

18 October
19:30

Turkey	56–32	Syria
Scoring by half: 28–15, 28–17

18 October
21:00

Spain	49–47	Greece
Scoring by half: 24–20, 25–27

19 October
20:00

Egypt	41–39	Spain
Scoring by half: 24–20, 17–19

== Medalists ==
Event	Gold	Silver	Bronze
Men	Egypt	Spain	Italy

== Final standings ==
Rank	Team
1st place, gold medalist(s)	Egypt Youssef Abbas, Youssef Abou Ouf, Medhat Bahgat, Armand Catafago, Abdel Rahman Hafez, Fouad el-Kheir, Hussain Montassir, Mohamed el-Rashidi, Raymond Sabounghi, Zaki Selim, Medhat Youssef.
2nd place, silver medalist(s)	Spain Freddy Borrás, Josep Brunet, Joan Dalmau, Guillermo Galíndez, Arturo Imedio, Manuel Martín, Andrés Oller, Jesús María Pérez, Carlos Piernavieja, Ignacio Pinedo. Coach: Fernando Font
3rd place, bronze medalist(s)	Italy Giancarlo Primo, Carlo Cerioni, Giorgio Bongiovanni, Carlo Negroni, Oscar Zia, Alberto Margheritini, Sergio Macoratti, Fabio Presca, Enrico Pagani, Carlo Muci, Dino Zucchi, Sergio Stefanini. Coach: Elliott Van Zandt
4	Greece Stelios Arvanitis, Themis Cholevas, Takis Christoforou, Alekos Karalis, Panagiotis Manias, Faidon Matthaiou, Nikos Milas, Kostas Papadimas, Giannis Spanoudakis, Mimis Stefanidis, Takis Taliadoros. Coach: Vladimiros Vallas
5	Lebanon
6	Turkey Yüksel Alkan, Ayhan Demir, Nejat Diyarbakırlı, Yalçın Granit, Sadi Gülçelik, Yalçın Okaya, Erdoğan Partener, Sacit Seldüz, Cemil Sevin, Şevket Taşlıca, Mehmet Ali Yalım. Coach: Samim Göreç
7	Syria
