= Turkey men's national basketball team =

Men's national basketball team representing Türkiye

Türkiye
- FIBA ranking: 9 ▲2 (1 September 2026)
- Joined FIBA: 1936
- FIBA zone: FIBA Europe
- National federation: TBF
- Coach: Ergin Ataman
- Nickname(s): 12 Dev Adam (12 Giant Men)

Olympic Games
- Appearances: 2
- Medals: None

FIBA World Cup
- Appearances: 6
- Medals: (silver) Silver: (2010)

EuroBasket
- Appearances: 26
- Medals: (silver) Silver: (2001, 2025)
Home	Away

First international
- Turkey 49–12 Greece (Istanbul, Turkey; 24 June 1936)

Biggest win
- Turkey 111–41 Algeria (Istanbul, Turkey; 13 April 1979)

Biggest defeat
- Croatia 113–63 Turkey (Berlin, Germany; 24 June 1993)

The Turkey men's national basketball team (Turkish: Türkiye Millî Basketbol Takımı), recognized as Türkiye by FIBA, represents Turkey in international basketball. They are governed by the Turkish Basketball Federation. Their nickname is the 12 Dev Adam, meaning 12 Giant Men.

Turkey has competed at every major international basketball tournament. Their greatest achievements are winning two silver medals at the EuroBasket, one on home soil in 2001, and another in 2025. They have also won silver at the FIBA World Cup, as hosts in 2010. Turkey won two gold (1987, 2013), one silver (1971), and three bronze (1967, 1983, 2009) medals at the Mediterranean Games. They also won a gold medal at the 1981 Balkan Championship.

Currently, Turkey stands 9th in the FIBA World Ranking.

== History ==
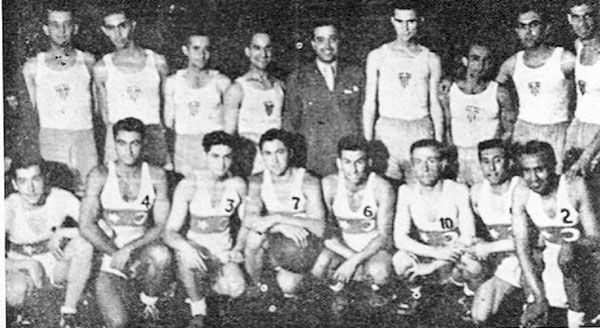
Turkey against Greece in 1936.

Ahmet Robenson was known as being the first organizer of basketball in Turkey. In 1936, Turkey played its first ever basketball match against Greece, winning 49–12.

For many years basketball was a little-known sport in Turkey, but when the American drama The White Shadow started airing in the country, it gained popularity. However, the national team at the time lacked experience and could not win any international tournaments until the 1980s, when Turkey won the gold medal at the 1981 Balkan Championship and the 1987 Mediterranean Games.

At the club level, Efes Pilsen was the first Turkish club to win a European Cup in any team sport, the 1995–96 FIBA Korać Cup. Since then, basketball in Turkey has grown immensely, as the national team began to play a major role in international tournaments. Turkey won the silver medal at both EuroBasket 2001, and the 2010 FIBA World Cup.

=== 1930s–1940s ===
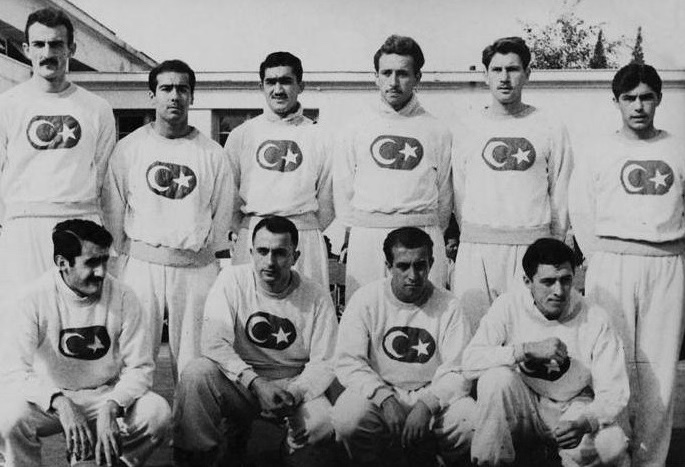
Turkey national basketball team squad in 1946.

Turkey’s debut at international tournaments, came with the 1936 Summer Olympics, where they recorded two defeats against Chile and Egypt.

Turkey's European Championship debut came at the EuroBasket 1949. The Turks split their six matches in the seven-team round robin tournament, finishing with three wins and three losses for fourth place. Hüseyin Öztürk, who was the scoring leader of the tournament, won the MVP award.

=== 1950s ===
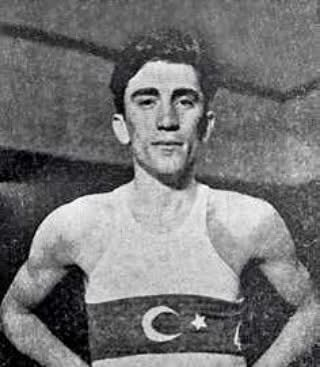
Yalçın Granit, leading player during the 1950s, and the first Turkish basketballer to play in a European team.

Turkey competed again at the EuroBasket 1951 in Paris. Their only loss in the preliminary round was to the Soviet Union as Turkey earned the second-rank spot with a 3–1 record. Their single loss to Bulgaria in the semi-final round, however, was enough to bump them from championship contention as they came out on the bottom of a three-way tie with a 2–1 record. They won their classification 5–8 game, but lost the 5/6 game to Italy.

Turkey returned after missing 1953's edition to the EuroBasket 1955 in Budapest. They went 1–2 in their preliminary round group, taking third in the pool and moving to classification play. There they lost only to France on their way to a 3–1 record in classification round 1. They lost their 9–12 semi-final by 1 point to Finland, but defeated England 77–54 in the next game to take 11th place of the 18 team tournament.

Turkey appeared again at the EuroBasket 1957 in Sofia. Losing to the Soviet Union and Poland in the preliminary round, Turkey took third in the group to be sent to the classification pool. They defeated each of the other seven teams in the classification round in order to take 9th place of the 16 teams. Turkey hosted EuroBasket 1959, but displayed a poor performance during the tournament finishing 12th.

=== 1960s–1980s ===
The 1960s, 1970s and 1980s were in general a barren period for the Turkish national basketball team. They were, however, successful at the Mediterranean Games, winning two bronze medals in 1967 and 1983, one silver medal in 1971, and one gold medal in 1987. Turkey also won the gold medal at the 1981 Balkan Championship. The team was led by notable coaches like Samim Göreç and Mehmet Baturalp in the 1960s and 1970s, and by Aydan Siyavuş during the Balkan and Mediterranean triumphs of the 1980s, which marked the dawn of a successful new era in Turkish basketball (especially in European club competitions) starting from the late 1980s and early 1990s. Efe Aydan and Erman Kunter were among the notable players of this period in Turkish basketball. Erman Kunter, who still holds a number of all-time records in the Turkish Basketball League as a player, later became a successful coach in the Turkish and French basketball leagues, and led the Turkish national team at the EuroBasket 1999.

=== 1990s ===
Turkey appeared again at the EuroBasket 1993 after 12 years of absence, but finished 11th among 16 teams. Turkey finished 13th among 14 teams at the EuroBasket 1995, 8th among 16 teams at the EuroBasket 1997, and again 8th among 16 teams at the EuroBasket 1999.

=== 2000s ===
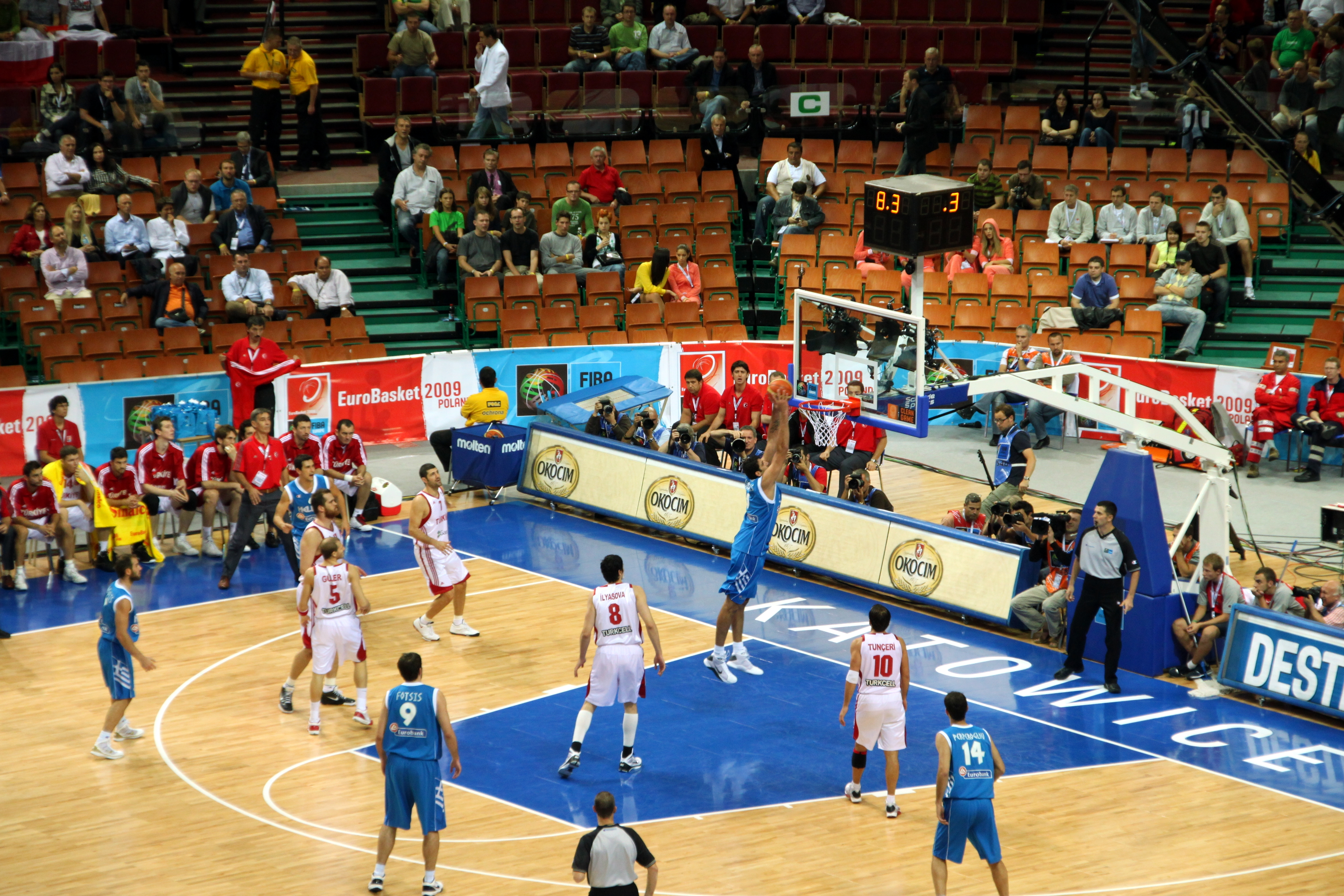
Turkey against Greece during the EuroBasket 2009 in Poland.

As the host country of the EuroBasket 2001, the Turkish national basketball team, led by coach Aydın Örs, reached the EuroBasket final for the first time in their history. Turkey defeated Croatia in the quarter-finals and Germany in the semis, before their showdown with FR Yugoslavia in the final. Turkey would ultimately lose the game {69–78}, finishing the Euros with the silver medal. Furthermore, Turkish stars İbrahim Kutluay scored 19 points in the final game, while Hidayet Türkoğlu was named to the All-Tournament team. The now-infamous march of the team, 12 Dev Adam by Athena was published the same year.

Due to their surprising finish at EuroBasket 2001, Turkey qualified for their first appearance to the FIBA World Cup in 2002. Turkey, however, would accumulate just four wins against four defeats at the World Cup to finish the tournament in ninth.

At the EuroBasket 2003, Turkey reached the second round where they got eliminated by Serbia and Montenegro.

Turkey qualified for the EuroBasket 2005 held in Serbia and Montenegro, but lost to Lithuania (87–75) and Croatia (80–67), defeating only Bulgaria (94–89) in the preliminary round. This win brought Turkey to the knock-out stage, where Germany eliminated the team 66–57. Turkey ended the tournament with a 9–12 rank.

Turkey was awarded one of the four wild cards by FIBA for the qualification to the 2006 FIBA World Cup in Japan.

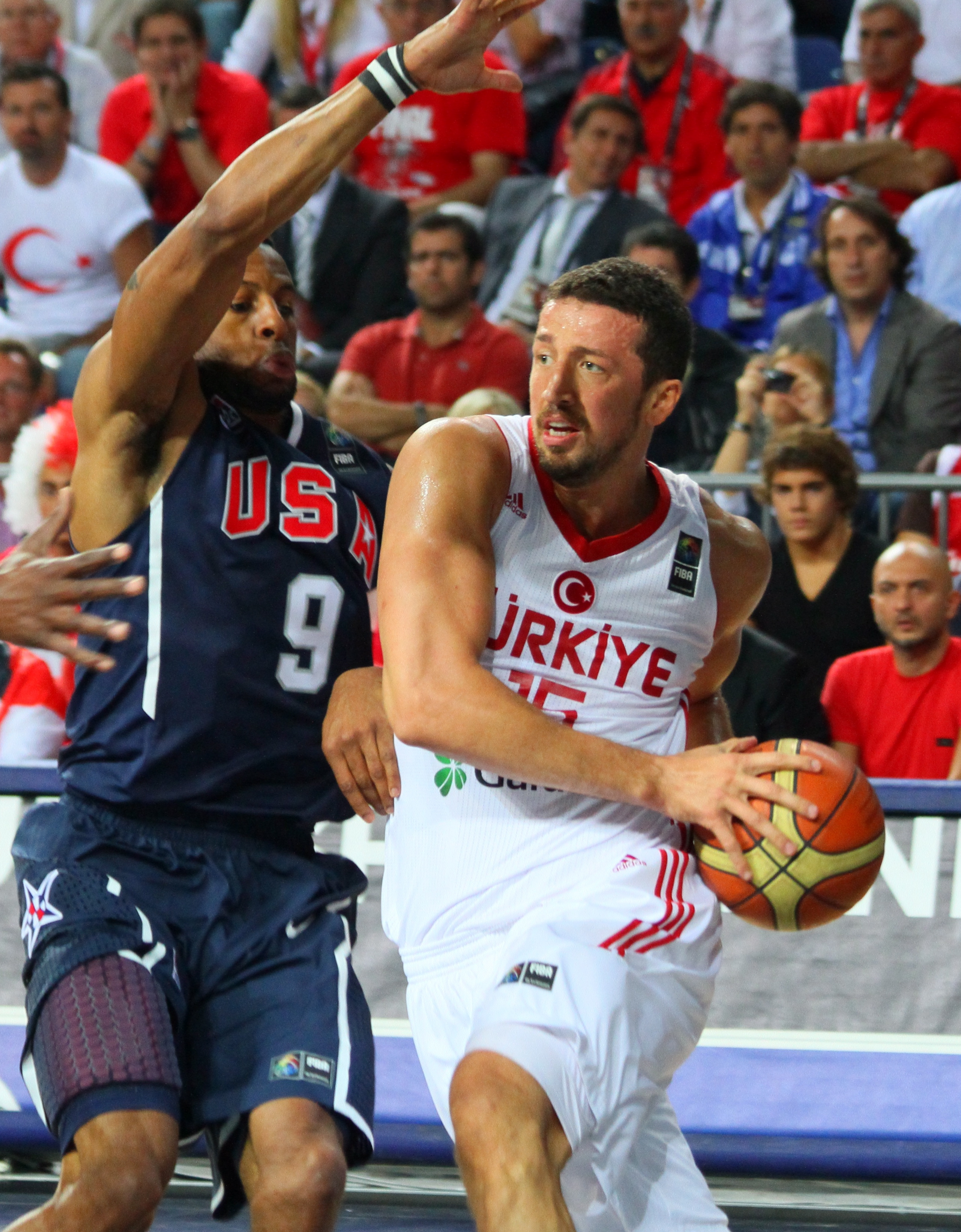
Hedo Türkoğlu, iconic player of Turkey during the 2000s.

The Turkish squad completed the preliminary round in Group C in second place behind the Greek team, and was entitled to play in the Round of 16. There the team defeated Slovenia 90–84, to advance into the quarter-finals of the World Cup for the first time in their history. However, In the quarter-finals, Turkey lost to Argentina, and was relegated to the classification round. There, Turkey would go on to defeat Lithuania once again, before losing to France to finish the tournament in sixth place.

After their surprising results at the tournament, a new nickname, 12 Cesur Yürek (12 Brave Hearts) was proposed after the young and inexperienced teams' fearless performance at the 2006 FIBA World Cup, despite not having star players Hidayet Türkoğlu, Mehmet Okur, Mirsad Türkcan, Kerem Tunçeri and Hüseyin Beşok.

At the EuroBasket 2007, Turkey played in Group C with Lithuania, Germany and the Czech Republic. Turkey began by losing 86–69 to Lithuania and was then blown out 79–49 by Germany. The team ended group play with an 80–72 win over fellow bottom-of-the-group team Czech Republic. With that win Turkey advanced to the next round, although the team lost all of its games (66–51 to Slovenia, 84–75 to Italy and 85–64 to France) in that phase. The three results eliminated Turkey from the EuroBasket 2007 with an (1–5) record and an 11th-place finish.

At the EuroBasket 2009, Turkey played in Group D with hosts Poland, Lithuania and Bulgaria. The Group D matches took place in Wrocław, Poland. Turkey won all three of its group matches and qualified for the second round.

Turkey enjoyed a strong start in the second round, as they won their first match against World Champions Spain 63–60; when Ömer Aşık and Ersan İlyasova rejected a last-second shot by Sergio Llull. Turkey then beat Serbia in overtime. Turkey's winning streak came to an end against Slovenia, when, despite a 19-point comeback, Engin Atsür missed a desperation three pointer in a 69–67 loss.

In the knockout stage, Turkey were against Greece and lost a close game in overtime, finishing the tournament 8th. Yet, in the same year, Turkey won the bronze medal at the 2009 Mediterranean Games.

=== 2010s ===
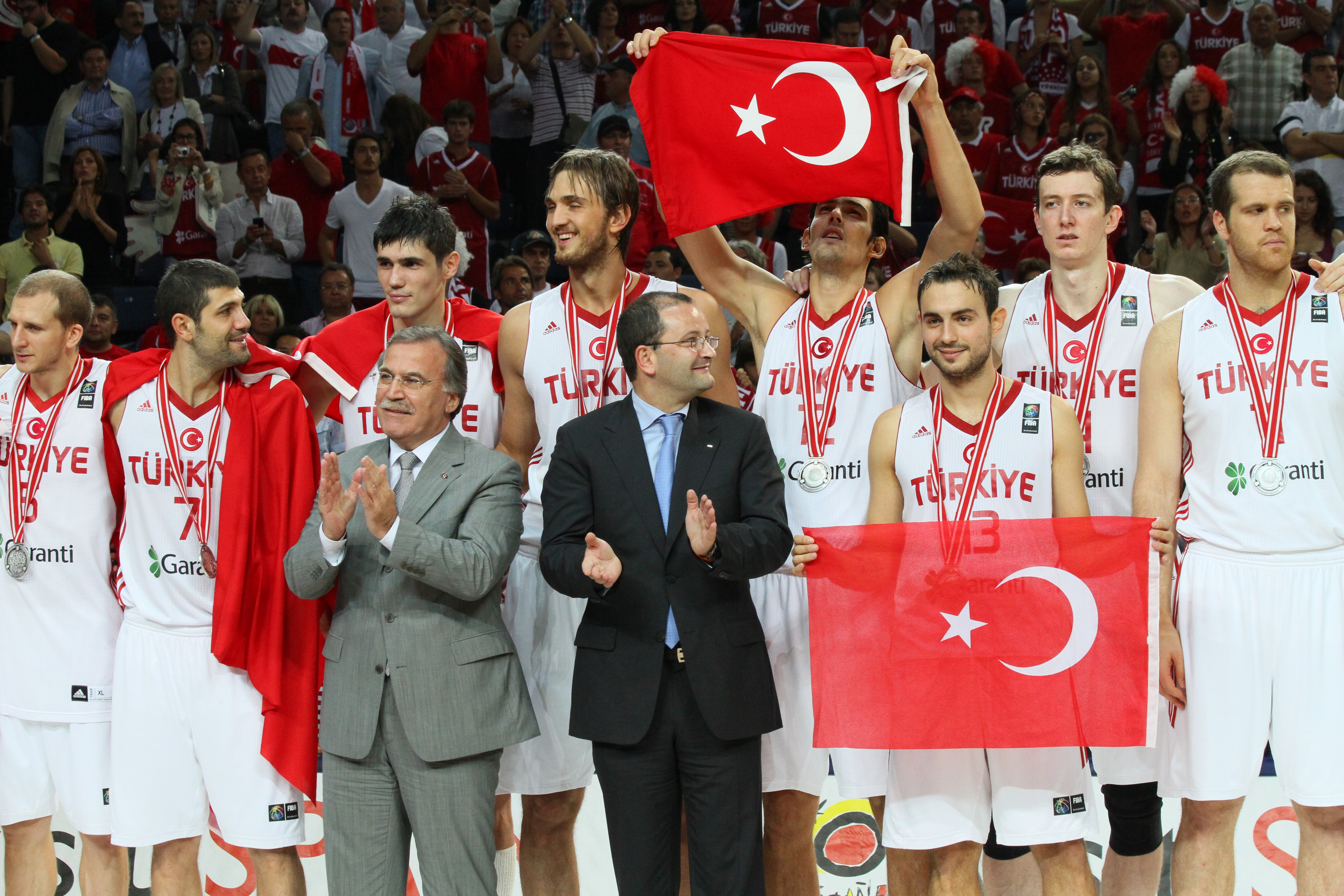
Turkey hosted the 2010 FIBA World Cup and won the silver medal, falling to the United States in the final.

As the host country, Turkey, led by coach Bogdan Tanjević, automatically qualified for the 2010 FIBA World Cup. Turkey topped their group, winning all of their games against the Ivory Coast, Russia, Greece, Puerto Rico and China. In the knockout stages Turkey managed to defeat France, Slovenia and Serbia in a thrilling semi-final match which Turkey won 83–82.

The national team enjoyed their greatest success to date on the international stage going undefeated in group play and progressing to the final, where they eventually lost to the United States to come away with the silver medal. Each player was awarded a prize of 1,500,000 TL (approximately $1,000,000 in September 2010) from the Turkish government for being the runner-up in the competition.

Orhun Ene, who was the assistant coach of Turkey next to Tanjević and had a successful career as a player, was appointed the head coach to lead Turkey during the EuroBasket 2011. The team had a disappointing tournament, as they were eliminated in the second group phase after losing three straight games. Turkey and Serbia were the only teams that managed to defeat the eventual EuroBasket 2011 champions Spain during the tournament.

Two years later, Turkey won their second gold medal at the 2013 Mediterranean Games by defeating Serbia in the final. A few months later at the EuroBasket 2013, Turkey managed to defeat only Sweden, before finishing the competition with a (1–4) record to fail making it out of the group stage.

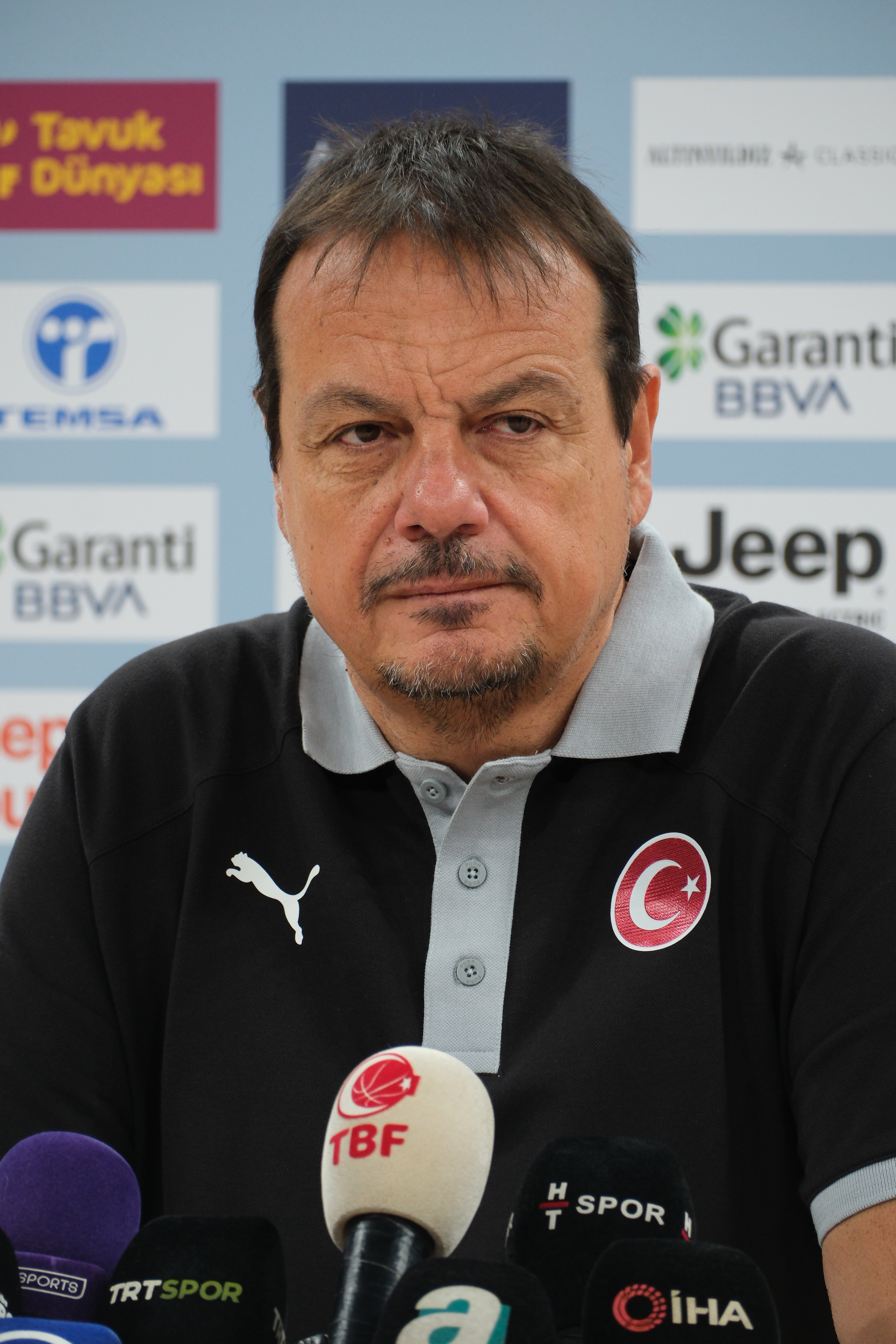
Ergin Ataman coached the national team at the 2014 FIBA World Cup, and was chosen as the best coach of EuroBasket 2025.

On 22 March 2014, the Turkish Basketball Federation announced that Ergin Ataman would lead Turkey during the 2014 FIBA World Cup, EuroBasket 2015 and the 2016 Summer Olympics. After receiving a wild card bid, Turkey qualified for the 2014 FIBA World Cup. The team was slotted into Group C, to begin their tournament run. Turkey would eventually accumulate a (3–2) record during the group phase to advance into the knockout rounds. In the Round of 16, Turkey earned a hard-fought victory over Australia 65–64. In the quarter-finals, Turkey's tournament appearance would come to an end as the national team fell to Lithuania 73–61.

At EuroBasket 2015, Turkey arrived on to the continental stage with confidence, after their solid play at the 2014 FIBA World Cup. Although the team would suffer a setback after getting past the group stage, as they were thoroughly outplayed in their Round of 16 match against France 76–53. After the disappointment for Turkey in 2015, head coach Ergin Ataman still had the responsibility to guide Turkey to the 2016 Olympic Tournament. The national team would once again have a let down, coming away with a (1–2) record during qualifying and being eliminated.

On 19 January 2017, Ufuk Sarıca succeeded Ergin Ataman as Turkey's new head coach. Sarıca was among the star players of Efes Pilsen in the 1990s, winning the 1995–96 FIBA Korać Cup and reaching the final of the 1992–93 FIBA Saporta Cup with the Istanbul-based club under head coach Aydın Örs.

Turkey was named one of four co-hosts for the EuroBasket 2017. However, the national team put up a near identical performance as they did at the 2015 edition Turkey was knocked out in the Round of 16 both times, although winning one fewer game in 2017.

In qualification for Turkey to make it to the 2019 FIBA World Cup, the national team posted an (8–4) record during European Qualifiers to make it to their fifth consecutive World Cup finals appearance. Entering the 2019 FIBA World Cup, Turkey was placed into Group E where they defeated Japan in their first match 86–67. In their next game the national team were up against the United States. In the highly competitive back and forth battle between the two sides that needed overtime to decide a winner, it was the Americans who pulled out the narrow 93–92 victory. After the demoralizing loss, Turkey would go on to lose their final match of the preliminary phase 76–91 to the Czech Republic, which relegated the team to the classification round to finish out the tournament.

=== 2020s ===
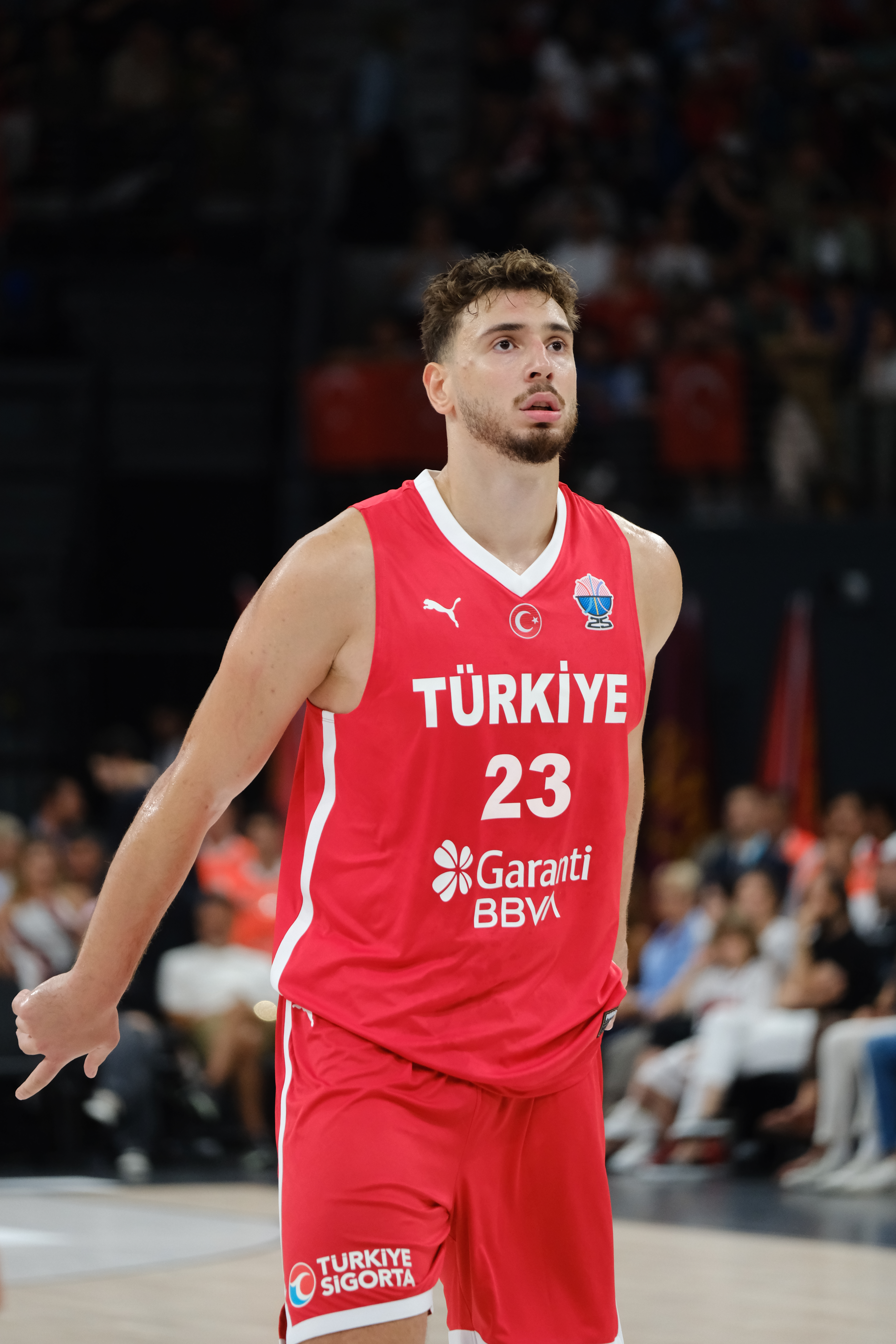
Alperen Şengün, an NBA All-Star, was a key player in both the 2022 and 2025 tournaments.

Orhun Ene was appointed head coach of Turkey for a second term on 23 November 2020. After Turkey failed to qualify for the 2023 FIBA World Cup, Ene resigned and was replaced by Ergin Ataman.

Under coach Ergin Ataman, and players like Cedi Osman, Furkan Korkmaz, Shane Larkin, and Alperen Şengün, Turkey reached the knockout stage of the EuroBasket 2022, where they were eliminated by France.

At the EuroBasket 2025, Turkey reached the final for the first time since 24 years and settled for the silver medal. Alperen Şengün recorded 28 points in an 83–88 loss against Germany.

Turkey became the first team to qualify for the 2027 FIBA World Cup with a perfect 8-0 run throughout their ongoing European Qualifiers campaign.

== Honours ==
The Turkish national team's all-time medal record:

Games	Gold	Silver	Bronze	Total
FIBA World Cup	0	1	0	1
EuroBasket	0	2	0	2
Mediterranean Games	2	1	3	6
Total	2	4	3	9

== Competitive record ==
=== FIBA World Cup ===
World Cup					Qualification		
Year	Position	Pld	W	L	Pld	W	L
(Argentina) 1950	Did not enter				Did not enter		
(Brazil) 1954	Did not enter				Did not enter		
(Chile) 1959	Did not qualify				EuroBasket served as qualifiers		
(Brazil) 1963	Did not qualify				EuroBasket served as qualifiers		
(Uruguay) 1967	Did not enter				Did not enter		
(Socialist Federal Republic of Yugoslavia) 1970	Did not qualify				EuroBasket served as qualifiers		
(Puerto Rico) 1974	Did not qualify				EuroBasket served as qualifiers		
(Philippines) 1978	Did not qualify				EuroBasket served as qualifiers		
(Colombia) 1982	Did not qualify				EuroBasket served as qualifiers		
(Spain) 1986	Did not qualify				6	2	4
(Argentina) 1990	Did not qualify				EuroBasket served as qualifiers		
(Canada) 1994	Did not qualify				EuroBasket served as qualifiers		
(Greece) 1998	Did not qualify				EuroBasket served as qualifiers		
(United States) 2002	9th	8	4	4	EuroBasket served as qualifiers		
(Japan) 2006	6th	9	6	3	Wild card		
(Turkey) 2010	2nd place, silver medalist(s)	9	8	1	Qualified as host		
(Spain) 2014	8th	7	4	3	Wild card		
(China) 2019	22nd	5	2	3	12	8	4
(Philippines) (Japan) (Indonesia) 2023	Did not qualify				10	4	6
(Qatar) 2027	Qualified				In progress		
(France) 2031	To be determined				To be determined		
Total	6/20	38	24	14	28	14	14

=== Olympic Games ===
Olympic Games					Qualifying		
Year	Position	Pld	W	L	Pld	W	L
(Nazi Germany) 1936	23rd	2	0	2			
(United Kingdom) 1948	Did not enter						
(Finland) 1952	21st	2	0	2			
(Australia) 1956	Did not qualify						
(Italy) 1960	Did not enter				Did not enter		
(Japan) 1964	Did not enter				Did not enter		
(Mexico) 1968	Did not enter				Did not enter		
(West Germany) 1972	Did not qualify				4	2	2
(Canada) 1976	Did not enter				Did not enter		
(Soviet Union) 1980	Did not qualify				4	3	1
(United States) 1984	Did not qualify				3	1	2
(South Korea) 1988	Did not qualify				4	1	3
(Spain) 1992	Did not qualify				5	3	2
(United States) 1996	Did not qualify				Did not qualify		
(Australia) 2000	Did not qualify				Did not qualify		
(Greece) 2004	Did not qualify				Did not qualify		
(China) 2008	Did not qualify				Did not qualify		
(United Kingdom) 2012	Did not qualify				Did not qualify		
(Brazil) 2016	Did not qualify				3	1	2
(Japan) 2020	Did not qualify				3	2	1
(France) 2024	Did not qualify				5	4	1
(United States) 2028	To be determined				To be determined		
Total	2/21	4	0	4	31	17	14

=== EuroBasket ===
EuroBasket					Qualification		
Year	Position	Pld	W	L	Pld	W	L
(Switzerland) 1935	No national representative						
(Latvia) 1937	Did not enter						
(Lithuania) 1939	Did not enter						
(Switzerland) 1946	Did not enter						
(Czechoslovakia) 1947	Did not enter						
(Egypt) 1949	4th	6	3	3			
(France) 1951	6th	9	6	3			
(Soviet Union) 1953	Did not enter						
(Hungary) 1955	11th	9	5	4			
(Bulgaria) 1957	9th	10	8	2			
(Turkey) 1959	12th	7	3	4			
(Socialist Federal Republic of Yugoslavia) 1961	10th	8	3	5			
(Poland) 1963	15th	9	1	8	Direct qualification		
(Soviet Union) 1965	Did not enter				Did not enter		
(Finland) 1967	Did not enter				Did not enter		
(Italy) 1969	Did not qualify				4	2	2
(West Germany) 1971	12th	7	1	6	4	3	1
(Spain) 1973	8th	7	2	5	10	6	4
(Socialist Federal Republic of Yugoslavia) 1975	9th	7	3	4	Direct qualification		
(Belgium) 1977	Did not qualify				5	1	4
(Italy) 1979	Did not qualify				9	6	3
(Czechoslovakia) 1981	11th	8	1	7	8	5	3
(France) 1983	Did not qualify				9	4	5
(West Germany) 1985	Did not qualify				5	2	3
(Greece) 1987	Did not qualify				9	2	7
(Socialist Federal Republic of Yugoslavia) 1989	Did not qualify				3	1	2
(Italy) 1991	Did not qualify				4	2	2
(Germany) 1993	11th	6	2	4	12	9	3
(Greece) 1995	13th	6	1	5	10	4	6
(Spain) 1997	8th	9	3	6	10	7	3
(France) 1999	8th	9	4	5	10	8	2
(Turkey) 2001	2nd place, silver medalist(s)	6	4	2	Qualified as host		
(Sweden) 2003	12th	4	2	2	10	7	3
(Serbia and Montenegro) 2005	9th	4	1	3	6	6	0
(Spain) 2007	11th	6	1	5	Direct qualification		
(Poland) 2009	8th	9	5	4	6	6	0
(Lithuania) 2011	11th	8	3	5	Direct qualification		
(Slovenia) 2013	17th	5	1	4	8	5	3
(France) (Croatia) (Germany) (Latvia) 2015	14th	6	3	3	Direct qualification		
(Finland) (Israel) (Romania) (Turkey) 2017	14th	6	2	4	Qualified as co-host		
(Czech Republic) (Georgia (country)) (Italy) (Germany) 2022	10th	6	3	3	6	3	3
(Cyprus) (Finland) (Poland) (Latvia) 2025	2nd place, silver medalist(s)	9	8	1	6	3	3
(Estonia) (Greece) (Slovenia) (Spain) 2029	To be determined				To be determined		
Total	26/41	186	79	107	154	92	62

== Results and fixtures ==
Win Loss

=== 2025 ===
27 November 2025 2027 FIBA World Cup qualifiers – 1st round	Turkey	93–71	Bosnia and Herzegovina	Istanbul, Turkey
21:00 (UTC+3)	Scoring by quarter: 29–20, 17–25, 21–13, 26–13
	Pts: Biberović 20; Rebs: Saybir 7 Asts: Sipahi 9	Boxscore	Pts: Alibegović 18; Rebs: Marić, Sulejmanović 4 Asts: Arslanagić 8	Arena: Turkcell Basketball Development Center; Attendance: 9,876; Referees: Wojciech Liszka (POL), Lorenzo Baldini (ITA), Ritvars Helmšteins (LAT)

30 November 2025 2027 FIBA World Cup qualifiers – 1st round	Switzerland	60–85	Turkey	Fribourg, Switzerland
17:00 (UTC+1)	Scoring by quarter: 17–23, 8–18, 17–24, 18–20
	Pts: Fofana 17; Rebs: Mambo 6 Asts: Fofana 4	Boxscore	Pts: Saybir 19; Rebs: Yurtseven 5 Asts: Sipahi 6	Arena: Site Sportif Saint-Léonard; Attendance: 3,000; Referees: Luis Castillo (ESP), Marius Ciulin (ROU), Blaž Zupančič (SVN)

=== 2026 ===
27 February 2026 2027 FIBA World Cup qualifiers – 1st round	Serbia	78–82	Turkey	Belgrade, Serbia
19:00 (UTC+1)	Scoring by quarter: 13–22, 18–24, 23–11, 24–25
	Pts: Marković 19; Rebs: Mitrović 8 Asts: Miljenović, Novak 5	Boxscore	Pts: Biberović 22; Rebs: Osmani, Yurtseven 8 Asts: Osman 6	Arena: Aleksandar Nikolić Hall; Attendance: 7,500; Referees: Yohan Rosso (FRA), Mārtiņš Kozlovskis (LAT), Zdenko Tomašovič (SVK)

2 March 2026 2027 FIBA World Cup qualifiers – 1st round	Turkey	94–86	Serbia	Istanbul, Turkey
21:00 (UTC+3)	Scoring by quarter: 28–21, 20–23, 28–19, 18–23
	Pts: Biberović 21; Rebs: Biberović 5 Asts: Biberović 5	Boxscore	Pts: Avramović 16; Rebs: Tanasković 6 Asts: Avramović 9	Arena: Turkcell Basketball Development Center; Attendance: 9,422; Referees: Luis Castillo (ESP), Paulo Marques (POR), Martin Horozov (BUL)

2 July 2026 2027 FIBA World Cup qualifiers – 1st round	Bosnia and Herzegovina	75–82	Turkey	Zenica, Bosnia and Herzegovina
20:00 (UTC+2)	Scoring by quarter: 18–17, 21–17, 18–25, 18–23
	Pts: Garza 27; Rebs: Garza 8 Asts: Atić 6	Boxscore	Pts: Hazer 16; Rebs: Osman 11; Asts: Sipahi 7	Arena: Arena Zenica; Attendance: 3,500; Referees: Antonio Conde (ESP), Dariusz Zapolski (POL), Ritvars Helmšteins (LAT)

6 July 2026 2027 FIBA World Cup qualifiers – 1st round	Turkey	95–72	Switzerland	Istanbul, Turkey
19:00 (UTC+3)	Scoring by quarter: 22–19, 25–22, 29–11, 19–20
	Pts: Yurtseven 18; Rebs: Bona 8 Asts: Şengün, Sipahi 5	Boxscore	Pts: Schumacher 23; Rebs: Schumacher, Soroa 4 Asts: Schumacher 5	Arena: Sinan Erdem Dome; Attendance: 14,508; Referees: Andris Aunkrogers (LAT), Edgard Ceccarelli (FRA), Silvia Marziali (ESP)

28 August 2026 2027 FIBA World Cup qualifiers – 2nd round	Turkey	94–66	Lithuania	Istanbul, Turkey
21:00 (UTC+3)	Scoring by quarter: 27–13, 28–21, 20–13, 19–19
	Pts: Osman 22; Rebs: Bona 7 Asts: Hazer 6	Boxscore	Pts: Olisevičius 11; Rebs: Blaževič 14; Asts: Stenionis 6	Arena: Turkcell Basketball Development Center; Attendance: 5,921; Referees: Wojciech Liszka (POL), Fernando Calatrava (ESP), Josip Jurčević (CRO)

31 August 2026 2027 FIBA World Cup qualifiers – 2nd round	Iceland	73–110	Turkey	Reykjavík, Iceland
19:30 (UTC+0)	Scoring by quarter: 14–33, 23–27, 19–20, 17–30
	Pts: Hermannsson, Pálsson 11; Rebs: Hlinason 9 Asts: Friðriksson 5	Boxscore	Pts: Bitim, Osman 17; Rebs: Bona 10; Asts: Flynn 8	Arena: Laugardalshöll; Attendance: 1,873; Referees: Antonio Conde (ESP), Andris Aunkrogers (LAT), Elvis Binders-Čoders (LAT)

26 November 2026 2027 FIBA World Cup qualifiers – 2nd round	Italy	vs.	Turkey	Rome, Italy
20:00 (UTC+1)
		Boxscore		Arena: PalaLottomatica

29 November 2026 2027 FIBA World Cup qualifiers – 2nd round	Turkey	vs.	Iceland	Istanbul, Turkey
19:00 (UTC+3)
		Boxscore		Arena: Turkcell Basketball Development Center

=== 2027 ===
26 February 2027 2027 FIBA World Cup qualifiers – 2nd round	Lithuania	vs.	Turkey	Lithuania
--:-- (UTC+2)
		Boxscore

1 March 2027 2027 FIBA World Cup qualifiers – 2nd round	Turkey	vs.	Italy	Turkey
--:-- (UTC+3)
		Boxscore

== Team ==
=== Current roster ===
Roster for the 2027 FIBA World Cup Qualifiers matches on 28 and 31 August 2026 against Lithuania and Iceland.

Turkey men's national basketball team roster
Players
Coaches

Pos.	No.	Name	Age – Date of birth	Height	Club	Ctr.
F	1	Metecan Birsen	31 – 6 April 1995	2.05 m (6 ft 9 in)	Beşiktaş	(Turkey)
SG	2	Şehmus Hazer	27 – 15 February 1999	1.90 m (6 ft 3 in)	Galatasaray	(Turkey)
PF	3	Yiğitcan Saybir	27 – 27 February 1999	2.01 m (6 ft 7 in)	Tofaş	(Turkey)
C	5	Sertaç Şanlı	35 – 5 August 1991	2.13 m (7 ft 0 in)	Fenerbahçe	(Turkey)
SF	6	Cedi Osman (C)	31 – 8 April 1995	2.00 m (6 ft 7 in)	PAOK Thessaloniki	(Greece)
SF	10	Onuralp Bitim	27 – 31 March 1999	1.96 m (6 ft 5 in)	Fenerbahçe	(Turkey)
PG	11	Malachi Flynn	28 – 9 May 1998	1.85 m (6 ft 1 in)	Bahçeşehir Koleji	(Turkey)
SG	22	Furkan Korkmaz	29 – 24 July 1997	2.00 m (6 ft 7 in)	Beşiktaş	(Turkey)
C	24	Ercan Osmani	28 – 4 August 1998	2.13 m (7 ft 0 in)	Anadolu Efes	(Turkey)
F/C	30	Adem Bona	23 – 28 March 2003	2.06 m (6 ft 9 in)	Philadelphia 76ers	(United States)
SF	33	Erkan Yılmaz	28 – 3 December 1997	1.92 m (6 ft 4 in)	Anadolu Efes	(Turkey)
PG	55	Kenan Sipahi	31 – 26 May 1995	1.97 m (6 ft 6 in)	Bahçeşehir Koleji	(Turkey)
C	77	Ömer Yurtseven	28 – 19 June 1998	2.13 m (7 ft 0 in)	Real Madrid	(Spain)

Head coach

- (Turkey) Ergin Ataman

Assistant coach(es)

- (Turkey) Yakup Sekizkök
- (Turkey) Cenk Yıldırım

Legend

- (C) Team captain
- Club – describes last
  club before the competition
- Age – describes age
  on 28 August 2026

=== Depth chart ===
Pos.	Starting 5	Bench 1	Bench 2	Bench 3	Inactive
C	Alperen Şengün	Ömer Yurtseven	Sertaç Şanlı	Furkan Haltalı
PF	Ercan Osmani	Adem Bona	Yiğitcan Saybir	Metecan Birsen	Yiğit Onan
SF	Cedi Osman	Furkan Korkmaz	Onuralp Bitim	Darius Karutasu
SG	Tarik Biberovic	Malachi Flynn	Yiğit Arslan	Erkan Yılmaz	Can Korkmaz
PG	Şehmus Hazer	Kenan Sipahi	Berk Uğurlu	Ömer Kutluay	İsmail Ulusoy

== Head coaches ==
- (Turkey) Rupen Semerciyan – (1935–1938)
- (Turkey) Samim Göreç – (1949–1951)
- (Turkey) Ali Uras – (1952)
- (United States) Eliot Van Zandt – (1952–1953)
- (Turkey) Samim Göreç – (1954–1955)
- (United States) Sam Fox – (1955–1956)
- (Turkey) Samim Göreç – (1957–1959)
- (United States) Jim McGregor – (1960)
- (Turkey) Yalçın Granit – (1960–1963)
- (Turkey) Osman Kermen – (1964)
- (Turkey) Samim Göreç – (1964–1966)
- (Turkey) Cavit Altunay – (1967)
- (United States) Michael Prekopiak – (1967)
- (Turkey) Yalçın Granit – (1968)
- (Turkey) Mehmet Baturalp – (1969)
- (Bulgaria) Petar Simenov – (1969)
- (Turkey) Mehmet Baturalp – (1971–1976)
- (Turkey) Aydan Siyavuş – (1977–1978)
- (Turkey) Rüştü Yüce – (1978–1979)
- (Turkey) Mehmet Baturalp – (1980)
- (Turkey) Önder Seden – (1981)
- (Turkey) Aydan Siyavuş – (1981–1987)
- (Turkey) Önder Seden – (1988)
- (Turkey) Mehmet Baturalp – (1989–1992)
- (Turkey) Aydan Siyavuş – (1992–1993)
- (Turkey) Nur Germen – (1993–1994)
- (Turkey) Çetin Yılmaz – (1994–1995)
- (Turkey) Ercüment Sunter – (1995–1997)
- (Turkey) Erman Kunter – (1997–2000)
- (Turkey) Aydın Örs – (2000–2003)
- (Montenegro) Bogdan Tanjević – (2004–2011)
- (Turkey) Orhun Ene – (2011)
- (Montenegro) Bogdan Tanjević – (2011–2014)
- (Turkey) Ergin Ataman – (2014–2016)
- (Turkey) Ufuk Sarıca – (2017–2020)
- (Turkey) Orhun Ene – (2020–2022)
- (Turkey) Ergin Ataman – (2022–present)

== Past rosters ==
1936 Olympic Games: finished 21st among 21 teams

1 Dionis Sakalak, 2 Jack Habib, 3 Hayri Arsebük, 4 Naili Moran, 5 Nihat Ertuğ, 6 Hazdayi Penso, 7 Sadri Usluoğlu, 8 Şeref Alemdar (Coach: Rupen Semerciyan)

1949 EuroBasket: finished 4th among 7 teams

3 Avram Barokas, 4 Sacit Seldüz, 5 Tevfik Tankut, 6 Haşim Tankut, 7 Hüseyin Öztürk, 8 Vitali Benazus, 9 Candaş Tekeli, 10 Ali Uras, 11 Erdoğan Partener, 12 Ayduk Koray, 13 Mehmet Ali Yalım, 14 Samim Göreç (Coach: Samim Göreç)

1951 EuroBasket: finished 6th among 17 teams

3 Yılmaz Gündüz, 4 Yalçın Granit, 5 Sacit Seldüz, 6 Ayhan Demir, 7 Ali Uras, 8 Cemil Sevin, 9 Sadi Gülçelik, 10 Avram Barokas, 11 Erdoğan Partener, 12 Ertem Göreç, 13 Mehmet Ali Yalım, 14 Nejat Diyarbakırlı (Coach: Samim Göreç)

1952 Olympic Games: finished 22nd among 23 teams

3 Yılmaz Gündüz, 4 Yalçın Granit, 5 Sacit Seldüz, 6 Ali Uras, 7 Güney Ülmen, 8 Altan Dinçer, 9 Sadi Gülçelik, 10 Mehmet Ali Yalım, 11 Erdoğan Partener, 12 Nejat Diyarbakırlı, 13 Turhan Tezol, 14 Yüksel Alkan (Coach: Samim Göreç)

1955 EuroBasket: finished 11th among 18 teams

3 Yüksel Böke, 4 Yalçın Granit, 5 Cahit Tanık, 6 Turhan Tezol, 7 Tunç Erim, 8 Yalçın Okaya, 9 Sadi Gülçelik, 10 Mehmet Ali Yalım, 11 Erdoğan Karabelen, 12 Altan Dinçer, 13 Üner Erimer, 14 Şinasi Ertan, 15 Yavuz Türkoğlu, 16 Yüksel Alkan (Coach: Samim Göreç)

1957 EuroBasket: finished 9th among 16 teams

3 Yılmaz Gündüz, 4 Yalçın Granit, 5 Orhan Girgin, 6 Turhan Tezol, 7 Tunç Erim, 9 Mehmet Baturalp, 11 Erdoğan Karabelen, 12 Altan Dinçer, 13 Üner Erimer, 14 Erkan Gündüz, 15 Yavuz Türkoğlu (Coach: Samim Göreç)

1959 EuroBasket: finished 12th among 17 teams

4 Nedret Uyguç, 6 Turhan Tezol, 7 Tunç Erim, 8 Ömer Urkon, 9 Mehmet Baturalp, 10 Özer Salnur, 11 Erdoğan Karabelen, 12 Ünal Büyükaycan, 13 Güner Yalçıner, 14 Tuğrul Demir, 15 Ali Kazaz, 16 Şengün Kaplanoğlu (Coach: Samim Göreç)

1961 EuroBasket: finished 10th among 19 teams

4 Nedret Uyguç, 5 Haşim Ülkü, 6 Şengün Kaplanoğlu, 7 Tuncer Kobaner, 8 Ömer Urkon, 9 Mehmet Baturalp, 10 Ersan Salihoğlu, 11 Erdal Poyrazoğlu, 12 Altan Dinçer, 13 Dursun Açıkbaş, 14 Yavuz Demir, 15 Ali Kazaz (Coach: Yalçın Granit)

1963 EuroBasket: finished 15th among 16 teams

4 Nedret Uyguç, 5 Nedim Hoşgör, 6 Şengün Kaplanoğlu, 7 Tuncer Kobaner, 8 Haşim Ülkü, 9 Mehmet Baturalp, 10 Halil Dağlı, 11 Özer Salnur, 12 Ünal Büyükaycan, 13 İlker Esel, 14 Yavuz Demir, 15 Hüseyin Kozluca (Coach: Yalçın Granit)

1971 EuroBasket: finished 12th among 12 teams

4 Nuri Tan, 5 Barış Küce, 6 Nadir Vekiloğlu, 7 Battal Durusel, 8 Cihat İlkbaşaran, 9 Kemal Erdenay, 10 Serdar Ersözlü, 11 Zeki Tosun, 12 Abdullah İnce, 13 Nur Germen, 14 Reşat Güney, 15 Hüseyin Alp (Coach: Mehmet Baturalp)

1973 EuroBasket: finished 8th among 12 teams

4 Nuri Tan, 5 Serdar Ersözlü, 6 Necmi Ton, 7 Doğan Hakyemez, 8 Aydın Örs, 9 Kemal Erdenay, 10 Battal Durusel, 11 Zeki Tosun, 12 Erdal Poyrazoğlu, 13 Abdullah İnce, 14 Halil Dağlı, 15 Reşat Güney (Coach: Mehmet Baturalp)

1975 EuroBasket: finished 9th among 12 teams

4 Nur Germen, 5 Barış Küce, 6 Nadir Vekiloğlu, 7 Doğan Hakyemez, 8 Ömürden Kısagün, 9 Kemal Erdenay, 10 Battal Durusel, 11 Zeki Tosun, 12 Erdal Poyrazoğlu, 13 Abdullah İnce, 14 Efe Aydan, 15 Kemal Akıncı (Coach: Mehmet Baturalp)

1981 EuroBasket: finished 11th among 12 teams

4 Serdar Koçyiğit, 5 Melih Erçin, 6 Necati Güler, 7 Doğan Hakyemez, 8 Aytek Gürkan, 9 Emir Turam, 10 Erman Kunter, 11 Mehmet Döğüşken, 12 Cevat Soydaş, 13 Efe Aydan, 14 Sadi Olcay, 15 Celal Arısan (Coach: Aydan Siyavuş)

1993 EuroBasket: finished 11th among 16 teams

4 Erdal Koşan, 5 Ömer Saybir, 6 Murat Konuk, 7 Orhun Ene, 8 Volkan Aydın, 9 Harun Erdenay, 10 Serdar Apaydın, 11 Levent Topsakal, 12 Ömer Büyükaycan, 13 Tamer Oyguç, 14 Lütfi Arıboğan, 15 Hüsnü Çakırgil (Coach: Nur Germen)

1995 EuroBasket: finished 13th among 14 teams

4 Murat Konuk, 5 Mirsad Türkcan, 6 Murat Evliyaoğlu, 7 Orhun Ene, 8 İbrahim Kutluay, 9 Harun Erdenay, 10 Serdar Apaydın, 11 Levent Topsakal, 12 Ömer Büyükaycan, 13 Tamer Oyguç, 14 Lütfi Arıboğan, 15 Haluk Yıldırım (Coach: Çetin Yılmaz)

1997 EuroBasket: finished 8th among 16 teams

4 Murat Konuk, 5 Kerem Tunçeri, 6 Mirsad Türkcan, 7 Orhun Ene, 8 Volkan Aydın, 9 Harun Erdenay, 10 İbrahim Kutluay, 11 Murat Evliyaoğlu, 12 Hüseyin Beşok, 13 Tamer Oyguç, 14 Tunç Girgin, 15 Ufuk Sarıca (Coach: Ercüment Sunter)

1999 EuroBasket: finished 8th among 16 teams

4 Kerem Tunçeri, 5 Hidayet Türkoğlu, 6 Mirsad Türkcan, 7 Cüneyt Erden, 8 Murat Konuk, 9 Haluk Yıldırım, 10 İbrahim Kutluay,
11 Mehmet Okur, 12 Hüseyin Beşok, 13 Tamer Oyguç, 14 Asım Pars, 15 Ufuk Sarıca (Coach: Erman Kunter)

2001 EuroBasket: finished (silver) among 16 teams

4 Kerem Tunçeri, 5 Hidayet Türkoğlu, 6 Mirsad Türkcan, 7 Orhun Ene, 8 Asım Pars, 9 Harun Erdenay (C), 10 İbrahim Kutluay,
11 Kaya Peker, 12 Hüseyin Beşok, 13 Mehmet Okur, 14 Haluk Yıldırım, 15 Ömer Onan (Coach: Aydın Örs)

2002 FIBA World Cup: finished 9th among 16 teams

4 Kerem Tunçeri, 5 Hidayet Türkoğlu, 6 Mirsad Türkcan, 7 Hakan Köseoğlu, 8 Asım Pars, 9 Harun Erdenay (C), 10 İbrahim Kutluay,
11 Kaya Peker, 12 Hüseyin Beşok, 13 Mehmet Okur, 14 Haluk Yıldırım, 15 Ömer Onan (Coach: Aydın Örs)

2003 EuroBasket: finished 12th among 16 teams

4 Kerem Tunçeri, 5 Hidayet Türkoğlu, 6 Mirsad Türkcan, 7 Ender Arslan, 8 Kerem Gönlüm, 9 Rasim Başak, 10 İbrahim Kutluay,
11 Kaya Peker, 12 Hüseyin Beşok, 13 Mehmet Okur, 14 Haluk Yıldırım, 15 Ömer Onan (Coach: Aydın Örs)

2005 EuroBasket: finished 9th among 16 teams

4 Kerem Tunçeri, 5 Ermal Kurtoğlu, 6 Mirsad Türkcan, 7 Ender Arslan, 8 Cenk Akyol, 9 Serkan Erdoğan, 10 İbrahim Kutluay,
11 Fatih Solak, 12 Kerem Gönlüm, 13 Mehmet Okur, 14 Kaya Peker, 15 Hidayet Türkoğlu (Coach: Bogdan Tanjević)

2006 FIBA World Cup: finished 6th among 24 teams

4 Cenk Akyol, 5 Ermal Kurtoğlu, 6 Engin Atsür, 7 Ender Arslan, 8 Ersan İlyasova, 9 Serkan Erdoğan, 10 İbrahim Kutluay, 11 Fatih Solak,
12 Kerem Gönlüm, 13 Semih Erden, 14 Kaya Peker, 15 Hakan Demirel (Coach: Bogdan Tanjević)

2007 EuroBasket: finished 11th among 16 teams

4 Ender Arslan, 5 Ermal Kurtoğlu, 6 Engin Atsür, 7 Cenk Akyol, 8 Ersan İlyasova, 9 Semih Erden, 10 Hakan Demirel, 11 İbrahim Kutluay, 12 Kerem Gönlüm, 13 Mehmet Okur, 14 Kaya Peker, 15 Hidayet Türkoğlu (C) (Coach: Bogdan Tanjević)

2009 EuroBasket: finished 8th among 16 teams

4 Bekir Yarangüme, 5 Sinan Güler, 6 Engin Atsür, 7 Ömer Onan, 8 Ersan İlyasova, 9 Barış Hersek, 10 Kerem Tunçeri, 11 Oğuz Savaş,
12 Semih Erden, 13 Ender Arslan, 14 Ömer Aşık, 15 Hidayet Türkoğlu (C) (Coach: Bogdan Tanjević)

2010 FIBA World Cup: finished (silver) among 24 teams

4 Cenk Akyol, 5 Sinan Güler, 6 Barış Ermiş, 7 Ömer Onan, 8 Ersan İlyasova, 9 Semih Erden, 10 Kerem Tunçeri, 11 Oğuz Savaş,
12 Kerem Gönlüm, 13 Ender Arslan, 14 Ömer Aşık, 15 Hidayet Türkoğlu (C) (Coach: Bogdan Tanjević)

2011 EuroBasket: finished 11th among 24 teams

4 Cenk Akyol, 5 Sinan Güler, 6 Emir Preldžič, 7 Ömer Onan, 8 Ersan İlyasova, 9 İzzet Türkyılmaz, 10 Kerem Tunçeri, 11 Oğuz Savaş,
12 Ömer Aşık, 13 Ender Arslan, 14 Enes Kanter, 15 Hidayet Türkoğlu (C) (Coach: Orhun Ene)

2013 EuroBasket: finished 17th among 24 teams

4 Doğuş Balbay, 5 Sinan Güler, 6 Emir Preldžič, 7 Birkan Batuk, 8 Ersan İlyasova, 9 Semih Erden, 10 Serhat Çetin, 11 Oğuz Savaş,
12 Kerem Gönlüm, 13 Ender Arslan, 14 Ömer Aşık, 15 Hidayet Türkoğlu (C) (Coach: Bogdan Tanjević)

2014 FIBA World Cup: finished 8th among 24 teams

4 Cedi Osman, 5 Sinan Güler (C), 6 Barış Ermiş, 7 Cenk Akyol, 8 Barış Hersek, 9 Emir Preldžič, 10 Kerem Tunçeri, 11 Oğuz Savaş,
12 Kerem Gönlüm, 13 Ender Arslan, 14 Ömer Aşık, 15 Furkan Aldemir (Coach: Ergin Ataman)

2015 EuroBasket: finished 14th among 24 teams

4 Kartal Özmızrak, 5 Sinan Güler (C), 6 Cedi Osman, 7 Barış Hersek, 8 Ersan İlyasova, 9 Semih Erden, 10 Melih Mahmutoğlu,
11 Oğuz Savaş, 12 Furkan Korkmaz, 13 Ali Muhammed, 14 Göksenin Köksal, 15 Furkan Aldemir (Coach: Ergin Ataman)

2017 EuroBasket: finished 14th among 24 teams

2 Erkan Veyseloğlu, 4 Doğuş Balbay, 5 Sinan Güler (C), 6 Cedi Osman, 7 Barış Hersek, 9 Semih Erden, 10 Melih Mahmutoğlu,
19 Furkan Aldemir, 21 Sertaç Şanlı, 22 Furkan Korkmaz, 25 Kenan Sipahi, 61 Göksenin Köksal (Coach: Ufuk Sarıca)

2019 FIBA World Cup: finished 22nd among 32 teams

1 Scottie Wilbekin, 4 Doğuş Balbay, 5 Metecan Birsen, 6 Cedi Osman (C), 8 Ersan İlyasova, 9 Semih Erden, 10 Melih Mahmutoğlu,
11 Ege Arar, 19 Buğrahan Tuncer, 21 Sertaç Şanlı, 22 Furkan Korkmaz, 24 Yiğit Arslan (Coach: Ufuk Sarıca)

2022 EuroBasket: finished 10th among 24 teams

0 Shane Larkin, 2 Şehmus Hazer, 3 Yiğitcan Saybir, 5 Onuralp Bitim, 6 Cedi Osman, 10 Melih Mahmutoğlu (C), 12 Sadık Emir Kabaca, 15 Sertaç Şanlı, 19 Buğrahan Tuncer, 22 Furkan Korkmaz, 23 Alperen Şengün, 24 Ercan Osmani (Coach: Ergin Ataman)

2025 EuroBasket: finished (silver) among 24 teams

0 Shane Larkin, 2 Şehmus Hazer, 5 Sertaç Şanlı, 6 Cedi Osman (C), 10 Onuralp Bitim, 22 Furkan Korkmaz, 23 Alperen Şengün,
24 Ercan Osmani, 30 Adem Bona, 33 Erkan Yılmaz, 55 Kenan Sipahi, 77 Ömer Yurtseven (Coach: Ergin Ataman)

== Gallery ==
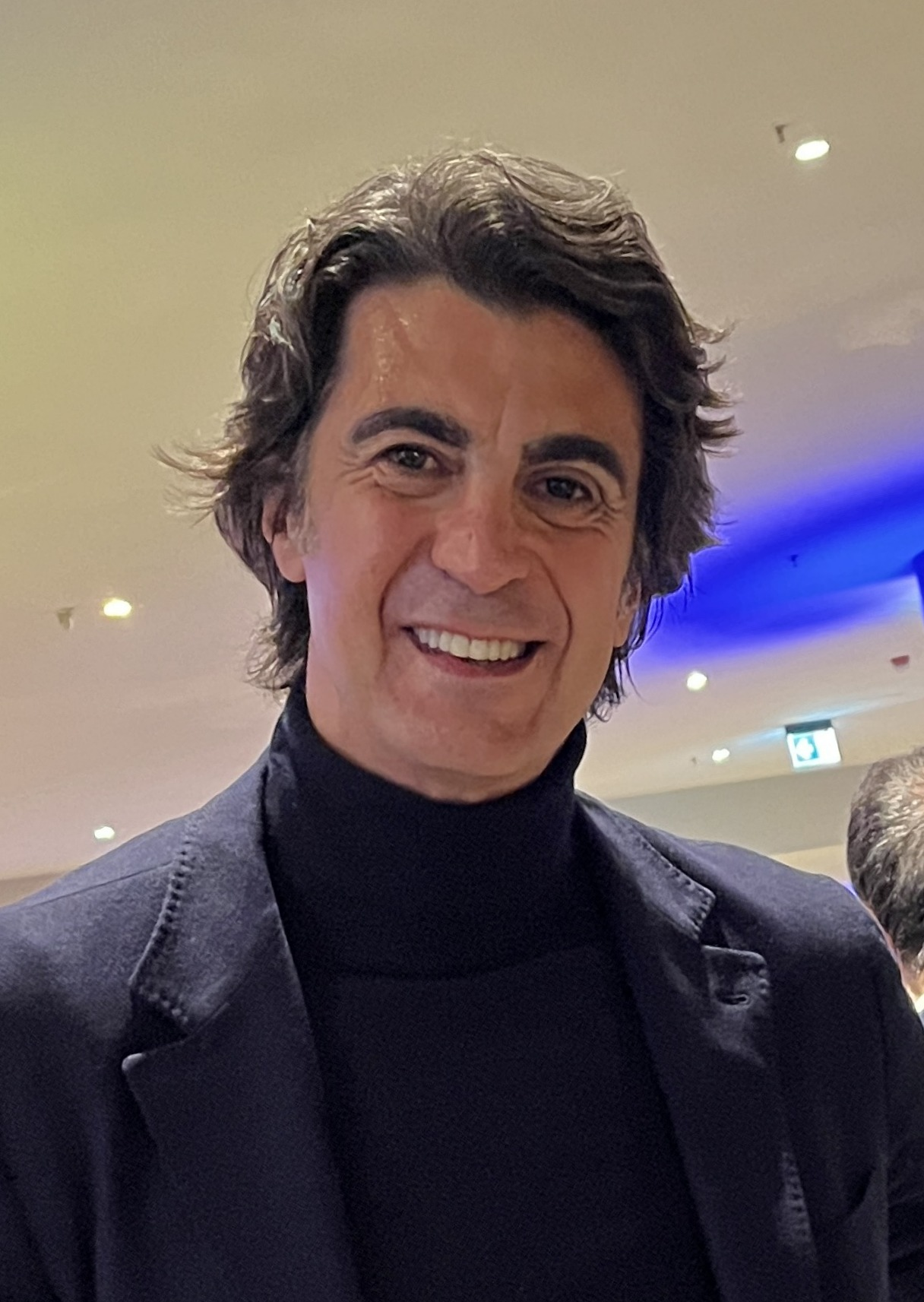
İbrahim Kutluay was the first Turkish basketball player to have won a major club competition.

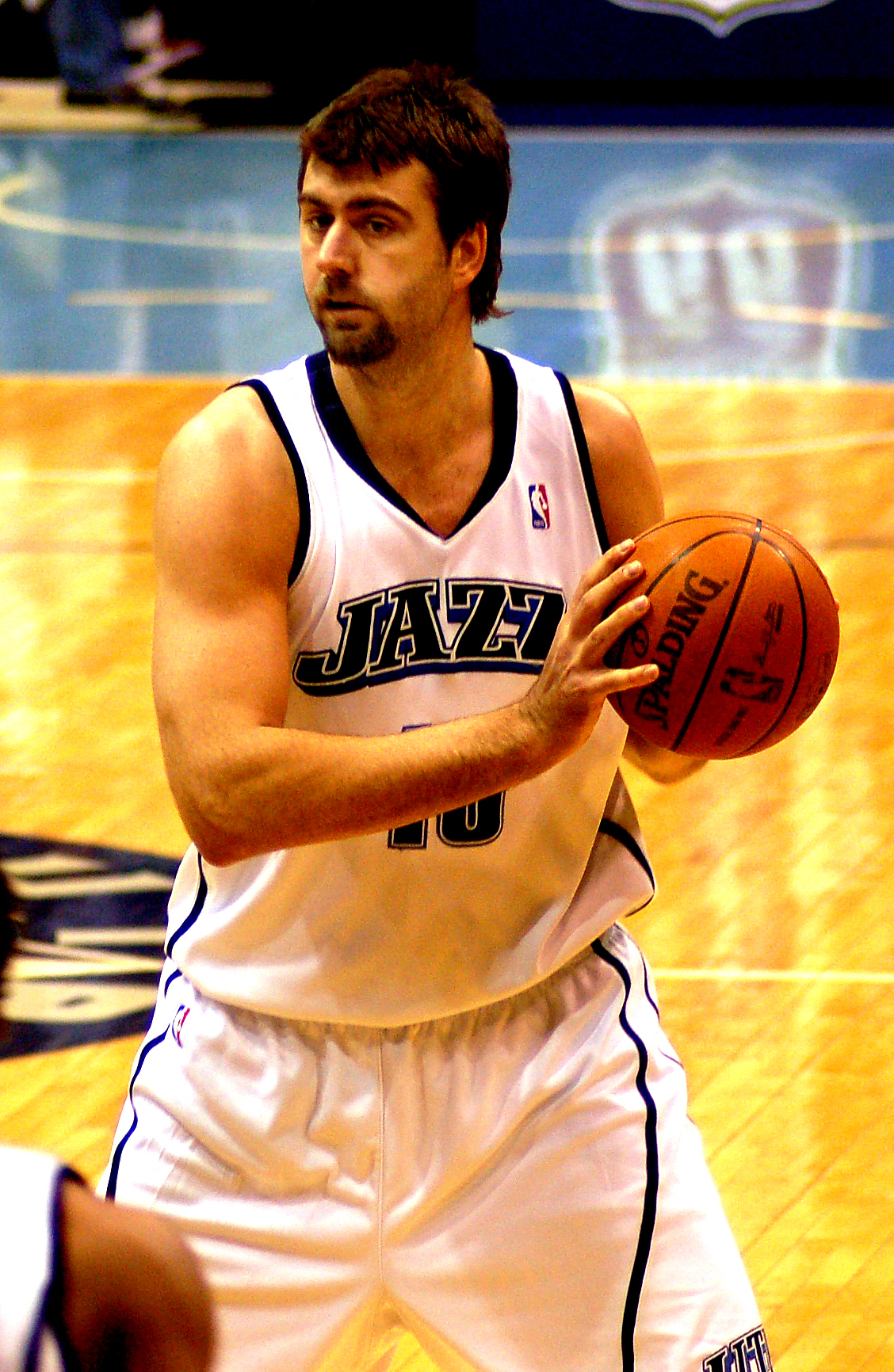
Mehmet Okur became the first Turkish player to win an NBA championship.

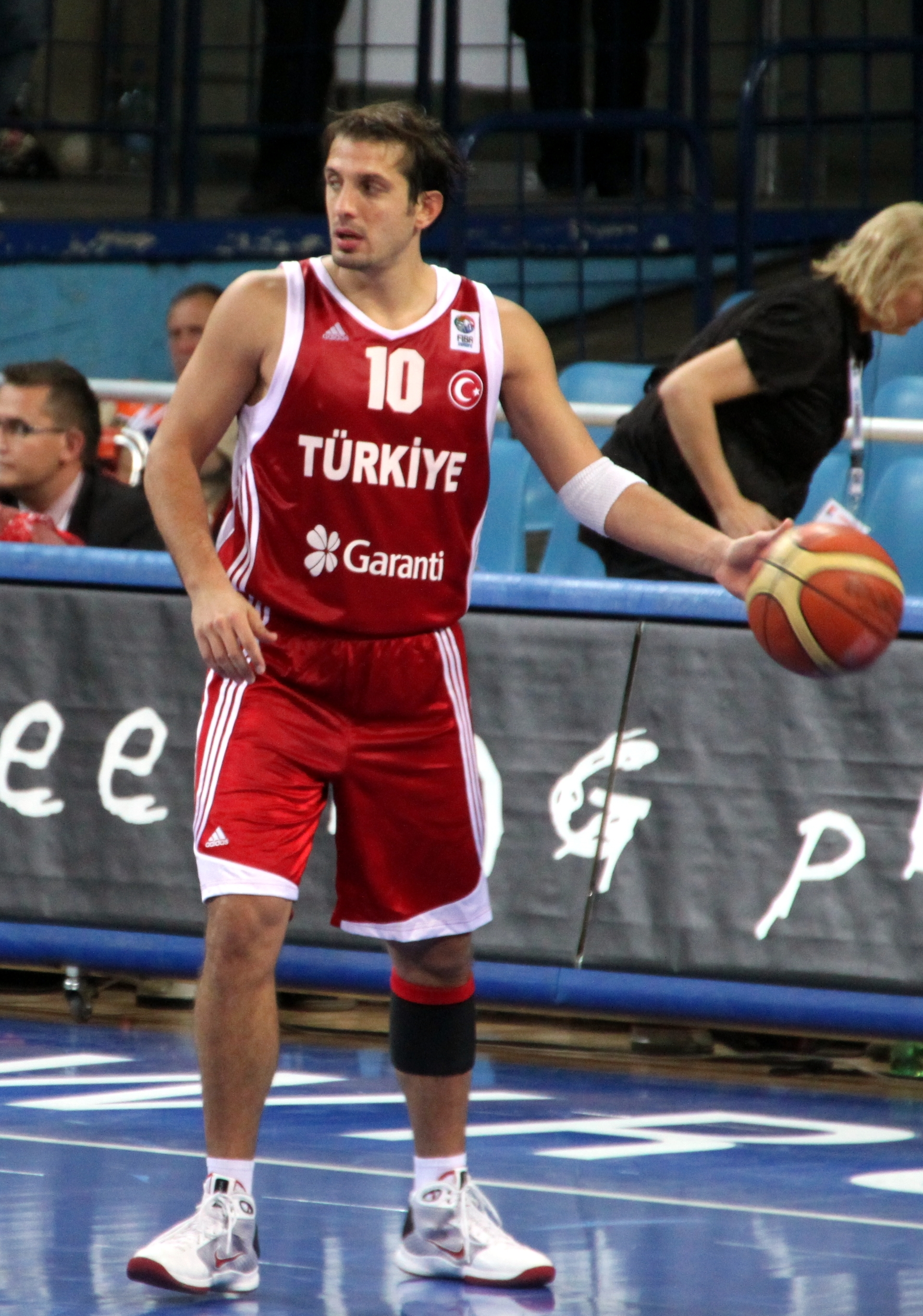
Kerem Tunçeri was a key member of the national team that won the silver medal at the 2010 FIBA World Cup.

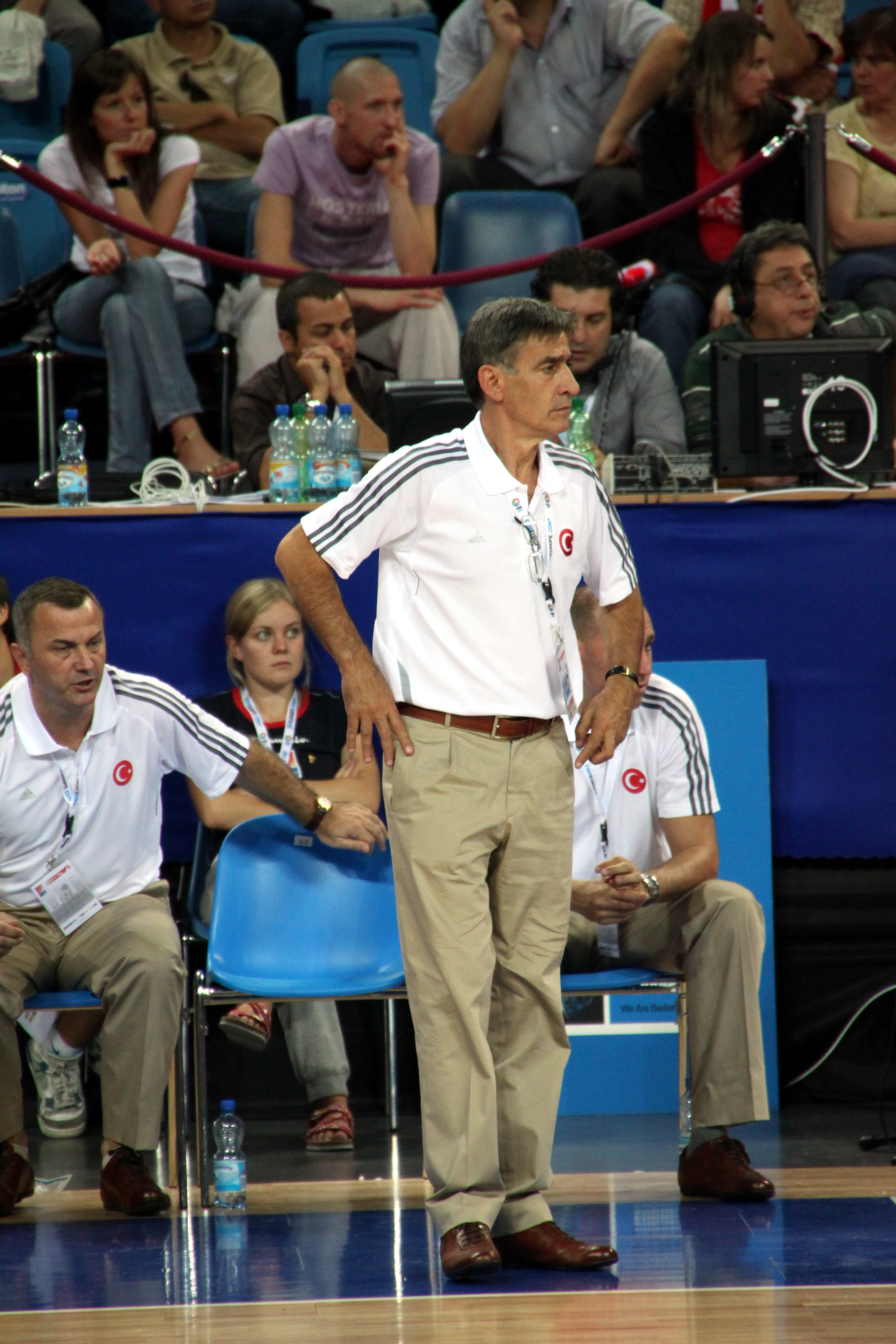
Bogdan Tanjević managed the national team at the 2010 FIBA World Cup.

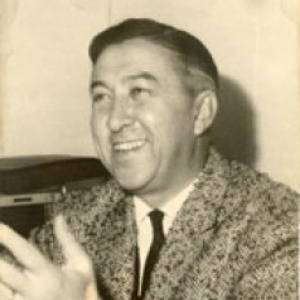
Naili Moran, one of the pioneering Turkish basketball players, who competed at the Summer Olympics in 1936.

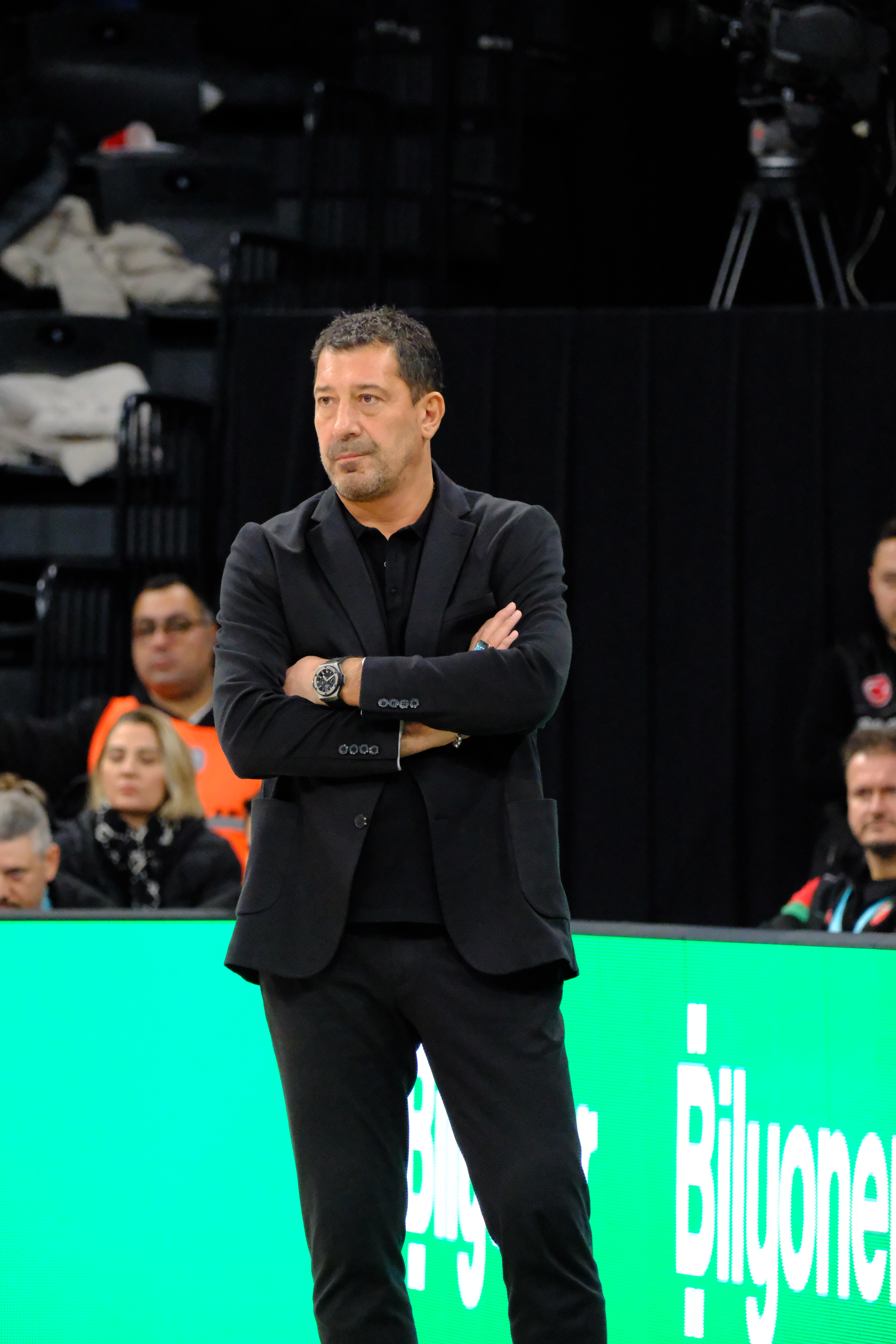
Ufuk Sarıca coached Turkey during EuroBasket 2017, and the 2019 FIBA World Cup.

== Kit ==
=== Manufacturer ===
- 2020–present: Puma

=== Sponsor ===
- 2001–present: Garanti BBVA
- 2019–present: TotalEnergies
- 2021–present: Bitci

== See also ==
- Sport in Turkey
- Turkey women's national basketball team
- Turkey men's national under-20 basketball team
- Turkey men's national under-18 and under-19 basketball team
- Turkey men's national under-16 and under-17 basketball team
- Turkey men's national 3x3 team
