= Cenk =

- Pronunciation: IPA: [dʒæɲc]
- Gender: male
- Language: Turkish

Origin
- Language: Persian
- Origin: jang (جنگ)
- Meaning: 'battle, war'

Cenk is a male Turkish given name. The Turkish word cenk is of Persian word jang (جنگ) and means 'war' or 'battle'. Notable people with the name include:

== Given name ==
- Cenk Ahmet Alkılıç (born 1987), Turkish footballer
- Cenk Akyol (born 1987), Turkish basketball player and coach
- Cenk Enes Özer (born 1978), Turkish novelist
- Cenk Gönen (born 1988), Turkish football goalkeeper
- Cenk Güvenç (born 1991), Turkish footballer
- Cenk İldem (born 1986), Turkish wrestler
- Cenk İşler (born 1974), Turkish footballer
- Cenk Koçak (born 1996), Turkish classic powerlifter
- Cenk Özkacar (born 2000), Turkish footballer
- Cenk Renda (born 1969), Turkish former basketball player
- Cenk Tosun (born 1991), Turkish footballer
- Cenk Ünnü (born 1966), Turkish drummer
- Cenk Uygur (born 1970), Turkish-American radio and TV show host
- Cenk Yıldırım (born 1972), Turkish basketball coach

== Middle name ==
- Devrim Cenk Ulusoy (born 1973), Turkish free-diver
- Enver Cenk Şahin (born 1994), Turkish footballer
- Seyhan Cenk Tekelioğlu (born 1973), Turkish footballer

== See also ==
- Cenk (missile), Turkish ballistic missile
