= Medhat =

Medhat is a masculine given name and surname of Arabic origin. Notable people with the name include:

== Given name ==
- Medhat Abbas, Palestinian doctor
- Medhat Abdel-Hady (born 1974), retired Egyptian footballer
- Medhat Haroun (1951–2012), Egyptian-American expert on earthquake engineering
- Medhat Hassanein (born 1939), Minister of Finance of Egypt from 2001 to 2004
- Medhat al-Mahmoud (born 1933), head of the Iraqi Supreme Judicial Council, Chief Justice of Iraq
- Medhat Moataz (born 2000), Egyptian fencer
- Medhat Youssef Mohamed (1927–2001), Egyptian basketball player
- Mohamed Medhat Bahgat (born 1926), Egyptian basketball player
- Mohsen Medhat Warda (born 1955), Egyptian basketball player

== Surname ==
- Adham Medhat (born 1975), Egyptian sport shooter
- Kamal Medhat (1951–2009), the deputy representative of the Palestinian Liberation Organization (PLO) in Lebanon
- Ramez Medhat (born 1999), Egyptian professional footballer
- Sherif Medhat (born 1988), Egyptian professional footballer

== See also ==
- Medhat Pasha Souq, a historically important souq in the Street Called Straight, Damascus, Syria
- Mehat
- Midhat
