= Ulusoy =

Ulusoy is a Turkish surname. Notable people with the surname include:

- Bülent Ulusoy (born 1978), Turkish boxer
- Çağatay Ulusoy (born 1990), Turkish model and actor
- Devrim Cenk Ulusoy (born 1973), Turkish free-diver
- Duygu Ulusoy (born 1987), Turkish female skier
- Haluk Ulusoy (born 1958), Turkish Football Federation president
- İsmail Cem Ulusoy (born 1996), Turkish basketball player
- Özge Ulusoy (born 1982), Turkish model, retired ballet dancer
