= Aydın Örs =

Turkish basketball player-coach

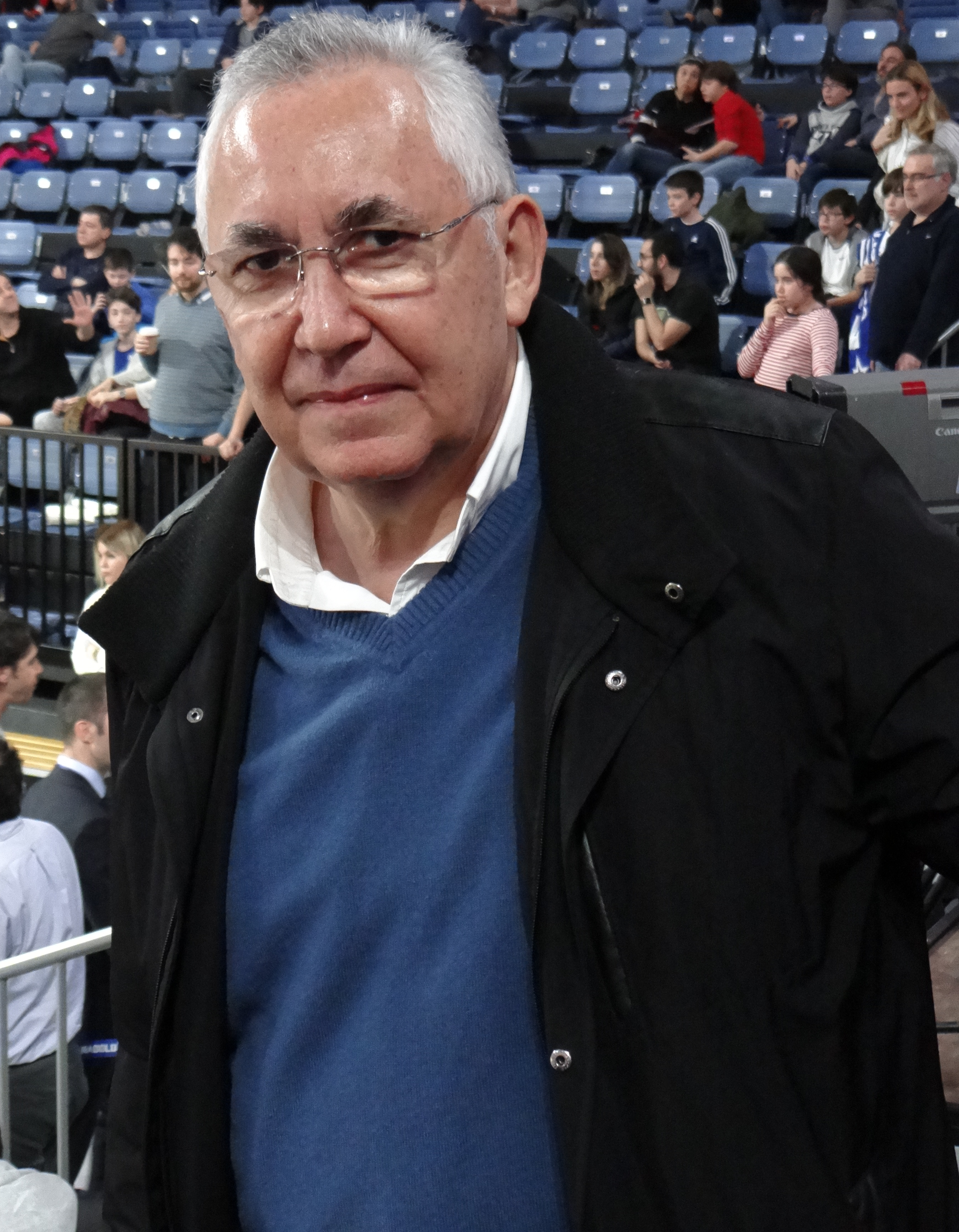
- Örs in 2018

Personal information
- Born: 23 July 1946 (age 80) Ankara, Turkey

Career information
- Playing career: 1963–1982
- Coaching career: 1983–2007

Career history

Playing
- 1963–1973: DSİ Spor (formerly known as Suspor)
- 1973–1978: Şekerspor
- 1978–1980: DSİ Spor
- 1980–1982: Şekerspor

Coaching
- 1983–1992: Efes Pilsen (youth)
- 1984–1986: Turkey (youth)
- 1992–1999: Efes Pilsen
- 1992: Turkey (youth)
- 2000–2003: Turkey
- 2003–2007: Fenerbahçe
Medals
Representing Turkey
European Championships
Silver medal – second place	2001 Turkey	Team

Aydın Örs (born 23 July 1946 in Ankara) is a Turkish former basketball coach and former head coach of Fenerbahçe. He started to play basketball in 1963. He played for DSİ Spor and Şekerspor. He also played 32 games with the Turkish national basketball team.

He started to be Efes Pilsen youth level coach in 1981 then head-coach of Efes Pilsen SK in 1992. He won 20 cups in 29 years as a head-coach.

He was the head-coach of the Turkish national basketball team when they played in the final of EuroBasket 2001.

He was also the head coach of Efes Pilsen SK where he won couple of titles, as well as the third biggest cup of European basketball on clubs-level, the Korać Cup in 1996. When he was the head-coach of Efes Pilsen S.K. he was known as the architect of "death zone" defense.

He also was the head coach of Fenerbahçe in 2007, where he earned another national title. His arguments with Will Solomon were notable as he benched the American basketball player after a few incidents.

== Honors ==
- with Efes Pilsen
  - Korać Cup (1): 1996
  - Turkish League (5): 1992, 1993, 1994, 1996, 1997
  - Turkish Cup (3): 1994, 1996, 1997
  - Turkish President's Cup (3): 1993, 1996, 1998
  - Saporta Cup: 1993 (runner-up)
  - Turkish Youth League: 4 times
- with Fenerbahçe
  - Turkish League (1) : 2007
- with Turkish National Team
  - EuroBasket 2001 final
- with Turkish National Youth Team
  - Balkan Cup (2): 1986, 1992
