= Abdel Rahman Hafez Ismail =

Egyptian basketball player (1923–1984)

Personal information
- Nationality: Egyptian
- Born: 17 February 1923 Alexandria, Egypt
- Died: 29 August 1984 (aged 61) West Lafayette, Indiana, U.S.

Sport
- Sport: Basketball
Medal record
Men's basketball
Representing Egypt
EuroBasket
Bronze medal – third place	1947 Prague
Gold medal – first place	1949 Egypt
Mediterranean Games
Gold medal – first place	1951 Egypt

Abdel Rahman Hafez Ismail (Arabic: عبد الرحمن حافظ اسماعيل; 17 February 1923 – 29 August 1984) was an Egyptian basketball player. He competed in the men's tournament at the 1948 Summer Olympics and the 1952 Summer Olympics.
