= Ercüment Sunter =

Turkish basketball player and coach

Ercüment Sunter (born 6 January 1955) is a Turkish former national basketballer and a coach.

Sunter had managed many teams in Turkish Basketball League as an experienced coach for over 20 years. Beslen, Türk Telekom B.K. (former Turkish PTT basketball team), Ülkerspor are among the teams he coached.

Sunter also coached Turkey national basketball team on both juniors and seniors level and competed in EuroBasket 1997 in Spain.

Sunter joined Türk Telekom B.K. in the beginning of 2007-08 season and got the record as the coach who managed the team for 10 seasons, the longest period.

Sunter is current head coach of Türk Telekom.
