= Haluk Yıldırım =

Turkish basketball player and general manager

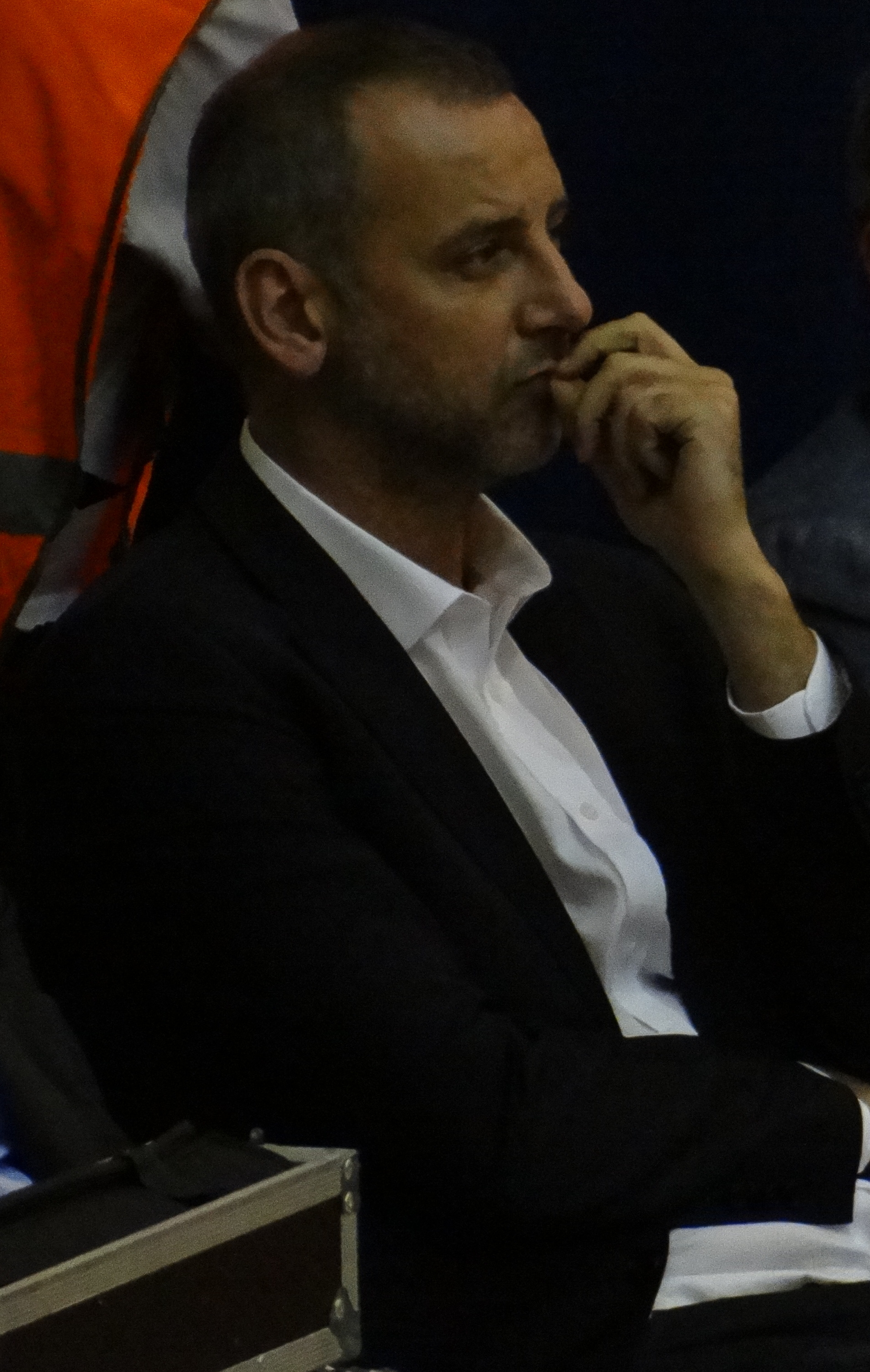

Personal information
- Born: 25 June 1972 (age 54) Bursa, Turkey
- Listed height: 6 ft 7 in (2.01 m)
- Listed weight: 210 lb (95 kg)

Career information
- Playing career: 1990–2012
- Position: Small forward

Career history
- 1990-1993: Kolej
- 1993-2004: Ülkerspor
- 2004-2005: Beşiktaş
- 2005-2008: Türk Telekom
- 2008-2010: Beşiktaş Cola Turka
- 2010-2012: Galatasaray Medical Park

Haluk Yıldırım (born 25 June 1972 in Bursa, Turkey) is a retired Turkish professional basketball player. He is currently the general manager of Karşıyaka Basket of the Turkish Basketbol Süper Ligi.

== Honors ==
- 3 times Turkish Championship
- 1 times Turkish Cup
- 4 times President's Cup

== International career ==
Haluk Yıldırım is a former Turkish national team player.

== Personal ==
In 2004, he was diagnosed with Hodgkin's lymphoma, but he successfully managed to recover from it. He graduated from Anatolian Lyceé of Adana.
