= Youssef Abou Ouf =

Egyptian basketball player (1924–1988)

Personal information
- Full name: Youssef Kamel Mohamed Abou Ouf
- Nationality: Egyptian
- Born: 23 March 1924 Cairo, Egypt
- Died: 7 March 1988 (aged 63) Cairo, Egypt

Sport
- Sport: Basketball
Medal record
Men's basketball
Representing Egypt
EuroBasket
Bronze medal – third place	1947 Prague
Gold medal – first place	1949 Egypt
Mediterranean Games
Gold medal – first place	1951 Egypt

Youssef Kamel Mohamed Abou Ouf (Arabic: يوسف كمال محمد أبو عوف; 23 March 1924 – 7 March 1988) was an Egyptian basketball player. He competed in the 1948 and 1952 Summer Olympics.
