= Youssef Abbas =

Egyptian basketball player (1920–1956)

Personal information
- Full name: Youssef Mohamed Abbas
- Nationality: Egyptian
- Born: 2 December 1920 Abu Zaabal, Qalyubiyya, Egypt
- Died: 28 October 1956 (aged 35) Mediterranean Sea

Sport
- Sport: Basketball
Medal record
Men's basketball
Representing Egypt
EuroBasket
Bronze medal – third place	1947 Prague
Gold medal – first place	1949 Egypt
Mediterranean Games
Gold medal – first place	1951 Egypt

Youssef Mohamed Abbas (Arabic: يوسف محمد عباس; 2 December 1920 – 28 October 1956) was an Egyptian basketball player. He competed in the 1952 Summer Olympics. He died after the plane he was travelling on was shot down during Operation Tarnegol over the Mediterranean Sea.
