= Armand Catafago =

Egyptian basketball player

Personal information
- Full name: Gabriel Armand Philippe Catafago
- Nationality: Egyptian
- Born: 13 January 1926 Alexandria, Egypt
- Died: 16 September 2010 (aged 84) Alexandria, Egypt

Sport
- Sport: Basketball
Medal record
Men's basketball
Representing Egypt
EuroBasket
Bronze medal – third place	1947 Prague
Gold medal – first place	1949 Egypt
Mediterranean Games
Gold medal – first place	1951 Egypt

Armand Catafago (13 January 1926 – 16 September 2010) was an Egyptian basketball player. He competed in the men's tournament at the 1948 Summer Olympics and the 1952 Summer Olympics.
