= Mohamed Ali Ahmed El-Rashidy =

Egyptian basketball player

Personal information
- Nationality: Egyptian
- Born: 11 February 1923
- Died: 22 December 2003 (aged 80)

Sport
- Sport: Basketball
Medal record
Men's basketball
Representing Egypt
EuroBasket
Gold medal – first place	1949 Egypt
Mediterranean Games
Gold medal – first place	1951 Egypt

Mohamed Ali Ahmed El-Rashidy (Arabic: محمد علي أحمد الرشيدي; 11 February 1923 – 22 December 2003) was an Egyptian basketball player. He competed in the men's tournament at the 1952 Summer Olympics.
