= Turhan Tezol =

Turkish basketball player (1932–2014)

Personal information
- Born: 9 August 1932 Istanbul, Turkey
- Died: 27 April 2014 (aged 81) İzmir, Turkey

Turhan Tezol (9 August 1932 – 27 April 2014) was a Turkish basketball player, who competed in the 1952 Summer Olympics.

Turhan Tezol was born to Mehmet Şükrü, an immigrant from Kavala, (then Ottoman Empire), and his wife Zeliha at Istanbul on August 9, 1932. He had four brothers, Alaettin, Tayyar, Erdoğan and Ayhan, as well as two sisters İnal and Mualla (Kuşçu).

Tezol began his playing career at the local team Modaspor. He enjoyed three times Turkish Basketball League championship title with his club. he left Modaspor, and moved to İzmir joining the basketball side of Altınordu. After retiring from active sports, he served as executive at the İzmir-based clubs Altay, Göztepe and Altınordu. Tezol worked also for the Turkish Basketball Federation.

At the age of 19, he was called up to the Turkey juniors national team. Later, he became member of the Turkey national team, taking part at the 1952 Summer Olympic in Helsinki, Finland, and three times at FIBA EuroBasket in 1955, 1957 and 1959. He capped 71 times in total for the national team, and served also as captain. He is remembered for his capacity in dribbling technique. He was married to Nesrin (née Gündoğdu), with whom he had two sons, Erhan and Ersin.

Turhan Tezol suffered from pancreatic cancer chronically. He died following surgery on 27 April 2014 in İzmir.
