= Youssef Mohamed (basketball) =

Egyptian basketball player (1927–2001)

Personal information
- Full name: Medhat Youssef Mohamed
- Nationality: Egyptian
- Born: 5 January 1927 Cairo, Egypt
- Died: 23 November 2001 (aged 74) Giza, Egypt

Sport
- Sport: Basketball
Medal record
Men's basketball
Representing Egypt
EuroBasket
Gold medal – first place	1949 Egypt
Mediterranean Games
Gold medal – first place	1951 Egypt

Medhat Youssef Mohamed (Arabic: مدحت يوسف محمد; 5 January 1927 – 23 November 2001) was an Egyptian basketball player. He competed in the men's tournament at the 1948 Summer Olympics and the 1952 Summer Olympics. He later became the President of the Egyptian Basketball Federation.
