= Mohamed Medhat Bahgat =

Egyptian basketball player (born 1926)

Personal information
- Nationality: Egyptian
- Born: 14 October 1926 Cairo, Egypt

Sport
- Sport: Basketball
Medal record
Men's basketball
Representing Egypt
Mediterranean Games
Gold medal – first place	1951 Egypt

Mohamed Medhat Bahgat (Arabic: محمد مدحت بهجت; born 14 October 1926) was an Egyptian basketball player. He competed in the men's tournament at the 1952 Summer Olympics.
