= Cenk Yıldırım =

Turkish basketball coach

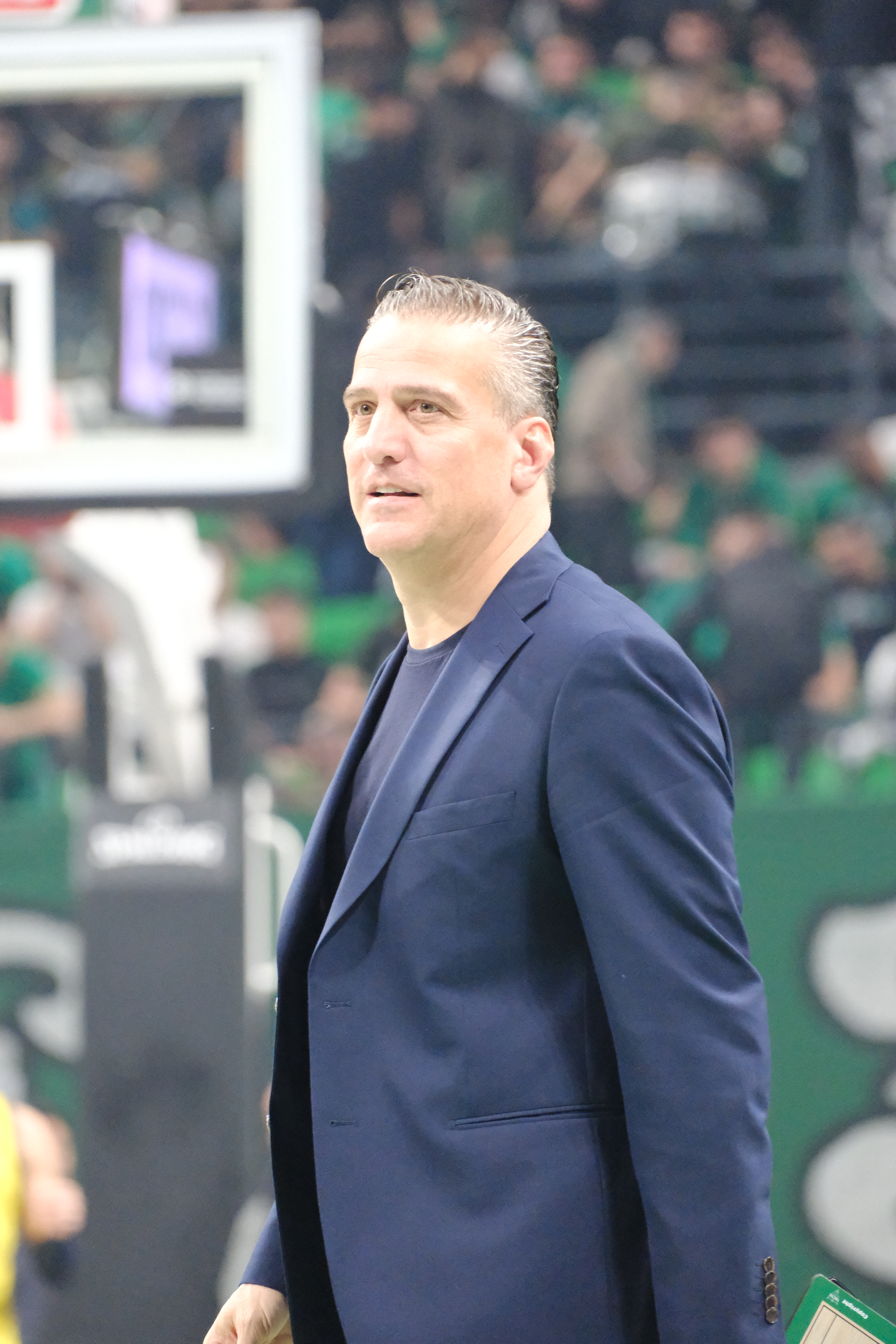
- Yıldırım with Panathinaikos in 2025

Personal information
- Born: 25 December 1972 (age 53) Istanbul, Turkey
- Coaching career: 2012–present

Career history

Coaching
- 2016–2023: Anadolu Efes (assistant)
- 2022–present: Turkey (assistant)
- 2023–2026: Panathinaikos (assistant)

Career highlights
- As assistant coach: 3× EuroLeague champion (2021, 2022, 2024); Greek League champion (2024); 2× Greek Cup winner (2025, 2026); 3× Turkish League champion (2019, 2021, 2023); 2× Turkish Cup winner (2018, 2022); 3× Turkish Super Cup winner (2018, 2019, 2022)
Medals
Men's basketball
Assistant coach for Turkey
EuroBasket
Silver medal – second place	2025 Cyprus–Finland–Poland–Latvia

Cenk Yıldırım (born 25 December 1972) is a Turkish professional basketball coach who last worked as an assistant coach for Panathinaikos of the Greek Basketball League (GBL) and the EuroLeague, under head coach Ergin Ataman. He is also one of the assistant coach of the Turkish national team since 2022.

== Early life ==
Yıldırım played professional basketball for Pertevniyal, Taçspor, Şekerspor and Kayseri Meysu.

== Coaching career ==
=== Anadolu Efes (2016–2023) ===
As an assistant coach, Yıldırım worked for Anadolu Efes between 2016 and 2023. Under head coach Ergin Ataman, he helped the team to three Turkish League Championships, two Turkish Cups, three EuroLeague Finals, and two EuroLeague titles in the 2020–21 and 2021–22.

Also, he was an assistant coach during the 2016–17 season under head coach Velimir Perasović.

Yıldırım was an assistant coach for the Turkish national team at the EuroBasket 2022 and at the 2023 FIBA Basketball World Cup qualification.

=== Panathinaikos (2023–2026) ===
In June 2023, Yıldırım moved to Greece as the assistant coach of Greek powerhouse Panathinaikos.

In the 2023–24 season, he won the EuroLeague title for Panathinaikos for the first time since 2011 and his third as an assistant coach. He was also part of Ergin Ataman's staff when Panathinaikos won the 40th league title.

On February 16, 2025, he won the Greek Basketball Cup for the first time after beating Olympiacos in the final.

== Career achievements ==
As assistant coach

- EuroLeague champion: 3 (with Anadolu Efes: 2020–21, 2021–22), (with Panathinaikos: 2023–24)
- Turkish League champion: 3 (with Anadolu Efes: 2018–19, 2020–21, 2022–23)
- Turkish Cup winner: 2 (with Anadolu Efes: 2018, 2022)
- Turkish Super Cup winner: 3 (with Anadolu Efes: 2018, 2019, 2022)
- Greek League champion: 1 (with Panathinaikos: 2023–24)
- Greek Cup champion: 2 (with Panathinaikos: 2025, 2026)
