= Seyhan Cenk Tekelioğlu =

Turkish footballer

Cenk Tekelioğlu (born 4 August 1973) is a retired Turkish professional footballer who played as a goalkeeper.

Tekelioğlu previously played for Sarıyer G.K., Konyaspor, Diyarbakirspor, Bursaspor, Altay S.K., Eskişehirspor, Sakaryaspor, and Bucaspor.
