= Mehat =

Mehtan
- Village
- Location in Punjab, India Mehtan (India)
- Coordinates: 31.245923°N 75.740056°E
- Country: indiaIndia
- State: Punjab
- District: Kapurthala

Government
  - Type: Panchayati raj (India)
  - Body: Gram panchayat

Population (2011)
  - Total: 2,856
- Sex ratio 1432/1424♂/♀

Languages
  - Official: Punjabi
- Time zone: UTC+5:30 (IST)
- PIN: 144401
- Telephone code: 01822
- ISO 3166 code: IN-PB
- Vehicle registration: PB-09
- Website: kapurthala.gov.in

Mehtan is a village in Phagwara tehsil in Kapurthala district of Punjab State, India. It is located 35 kilometres (22 mi) from Kapurthala,15 kilometres from jalandhar, 5 kilometres (3.1 mi) from Phagwara. Located at NH 44 used to call it g.t.road or grand trunk road.Mehtan has a Three gurdawara one hindu temple as well two gurdawara located in the village and one gurdawara located outside the village sixth guru of sikhs guru Hargoband singh sahib ji rested under the huge tree also big pond is there.along side the railway track government high school mehtan also football stadium

The village is administrated by a Sarpanch who is an elected representative of village as per the constitution of India and Panchayati raj (India). As part of Punjab's rural framework, the village falls under the local administrative and development programs associated with the Panchayati Raj system.

== Population ==
It has a population of around 2,856 residents, with a relatively balanced gender ratio and a literacy rate of approximately 79%, which is higher than the state's average. Mehat's population predominantly belongs to Scheduled Castes, comprising about 73% of the residents. The village operates under a Gram Panchayat governance system, headed by a Sarpanch, who is an elected representative.

== Economy ==
Agriculture is the main source of livelihood in Mehat, with residents engaged primarily as cultivators and agricultural laborers.

== Transport ==
Phagwara Junction Railway Station ad Chiheru Railway Station are the nearby railway stations to Mehat, while Jalandhar City Rail Way station is 18 km away from the village. The village is 113 km away from Sri Guru Ram Dass Jee International Airport in Amritsar and the other nearest airport is Sahnewal Airport in Ludhiana which is located 44 km away from the village. Phagwara, Jandiala, Jalandhar, Phillaur are the nearby cities to Mehat village.
