= Cenk Akyol =

Turkish basketball player (born 1987)

- Akyol with Anadolu Efes in 2026

Anadolu Efes
- Title: Assistant coach
- League: BSL; EuroLeague

Personal information
- Born: 16 April 1987 (age 39) Kadıköy, Turkey
- Listed height: 6 ft 5.5 in (1.97 m)
- Listed weight: 208 lb (94 kg)

Career information
- NBA draft: 2005: 2nd round, 59th overall pick
- Drafted by: Atlanta Hawks
- Playing career: 2003–2020
- Position: Shooting guard / small forward
- Number: 4, 7, 11, 17

Career history

Playing
- 2003–2009: Efes Pilsen
- 2007–2008: → Galatasaray
- 2009–2010: Air Avellino
- 2010–2012: Anadolu Efes
- 2012–2014: Galatasaray
- 2014–2015: Anadolu Efes
- 2015–2016: Beşiktaş
- 2016–2017: Acıbadem Üniversitesi
- 2018–2020: İTÜ

Coaching
- 2021–2023: Galatasaray (assistant)
- 2023–2024: Bahçeşehir Koleji (assistant)
- 2024–2026: Anadolu Efes (youth)
- 2026–present: Anadolu Efes (assistant)

Career highlights
- As assistant coach: VTB United League Supercup winner (2026)
- Stats at Basketball Reference
Medals
Representing Turkey
FIBA World Championship
Silver medal – second place	2010 Turkey	Team
FIBA Europe Under-18 Championship
Silver medal – second place	2005 Serbia & Montenegro	U-18 Team
Silver medal – second place	2004 Spain	U-18 Team

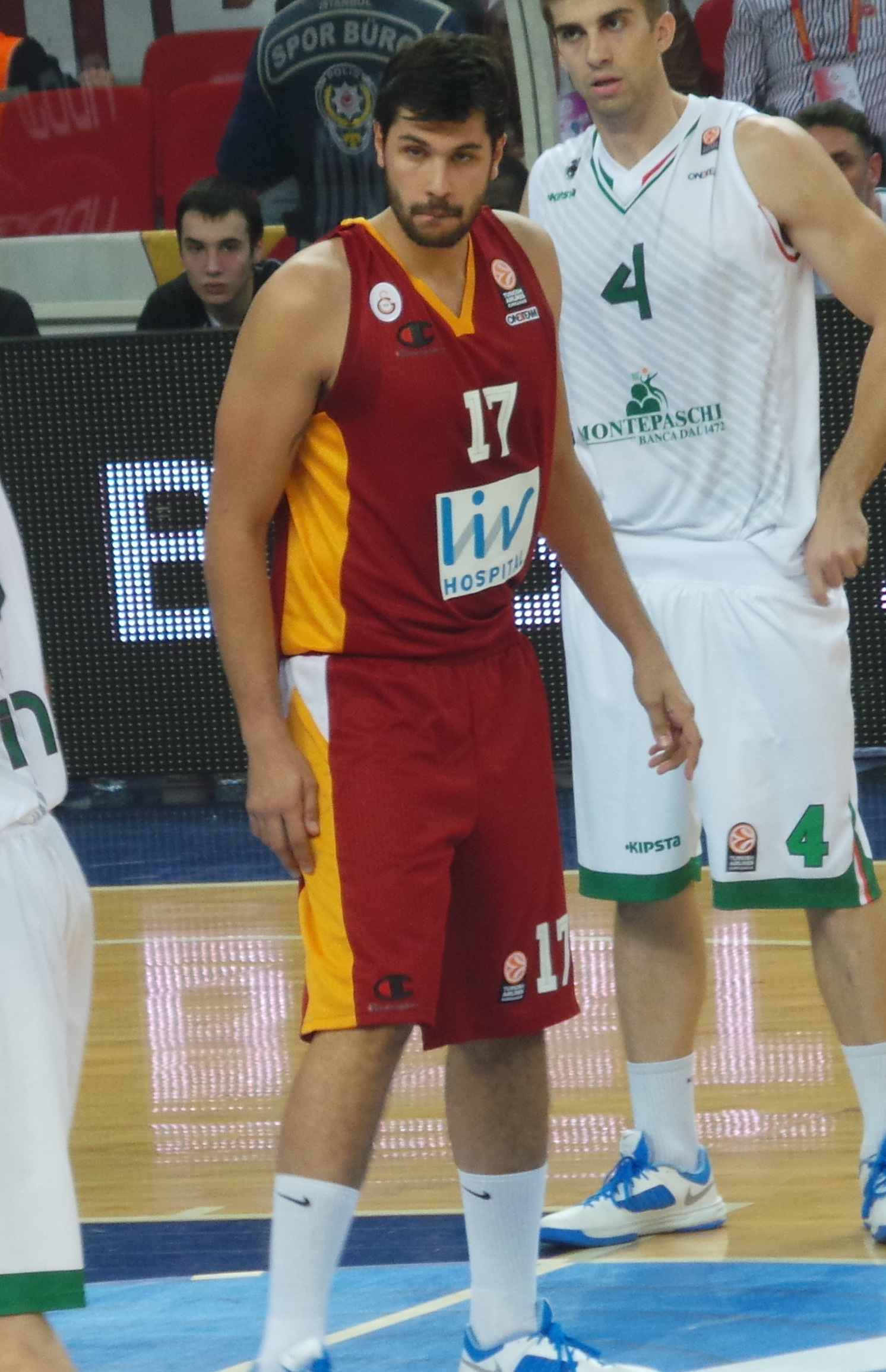
Akyol with Galatasaray in 2013

Cenk Akyol (born 16 April 1987) is a Turkish professional basketball coach and former player who played at the shooting guard position. He is an assistant coach for Anadolu Efes of the Turkish Basketbol Süper Ligi (BSL) and the EuroLeague.

== Professional career ==
On 3 July 2015, Akyol signed a multi-year contract with Beşiktaş Integral Forex. After one season he left the club. On 20 October 2016, he signed with Acıbadem Üniversitesi of the Turkish Basketball First League.

=== NBA ===
Akyol was drafted 59th overall in the 2005 NBA draft by the Atlanta Hawks. On 20 February 2014 the Atlanta Hawks traded Akyol's draft rights to the Los Angeles Clippers in exchange for Antawn Jamison and on 7 January 2015 the Clippers traded his rights to the Philadelphia 76ers, along with Jared Cunningham and cash for the rights to Sergei Lishouk. On 19 February 2015 he was again traded to the Denver Nuggets for JaVale McGee and the rights to Chukwudiebere Maduabum. On 18 January 2017 Akyol's draft rights were traded back to the Atlanta Hawks in exchange for the player rights of Mo Williams and cash considerations. His draft rights would later be traded once again, on 23 February 2017, alongside Mike Scott and cash considerations for a Top-55 protected second round pick from the Phoenix Suns.

On 2 July 2018 he signed with Sigortam.net İTÜ Basket of the Turkish Basketball First League.

== Turkish national team ==
Akyol is also a regular Turkish national team player.

== Coaching career ==
As of August 2021, he started to work as an assistant coach at Galatasaray Nef.

== Personal life ==
On 21 August 2013 Akyol married former national volleyball player and member of Galatasaray Naz Aydemir.
