= Yiğitcan Saybir =

Turkish basketball player (born 1999)

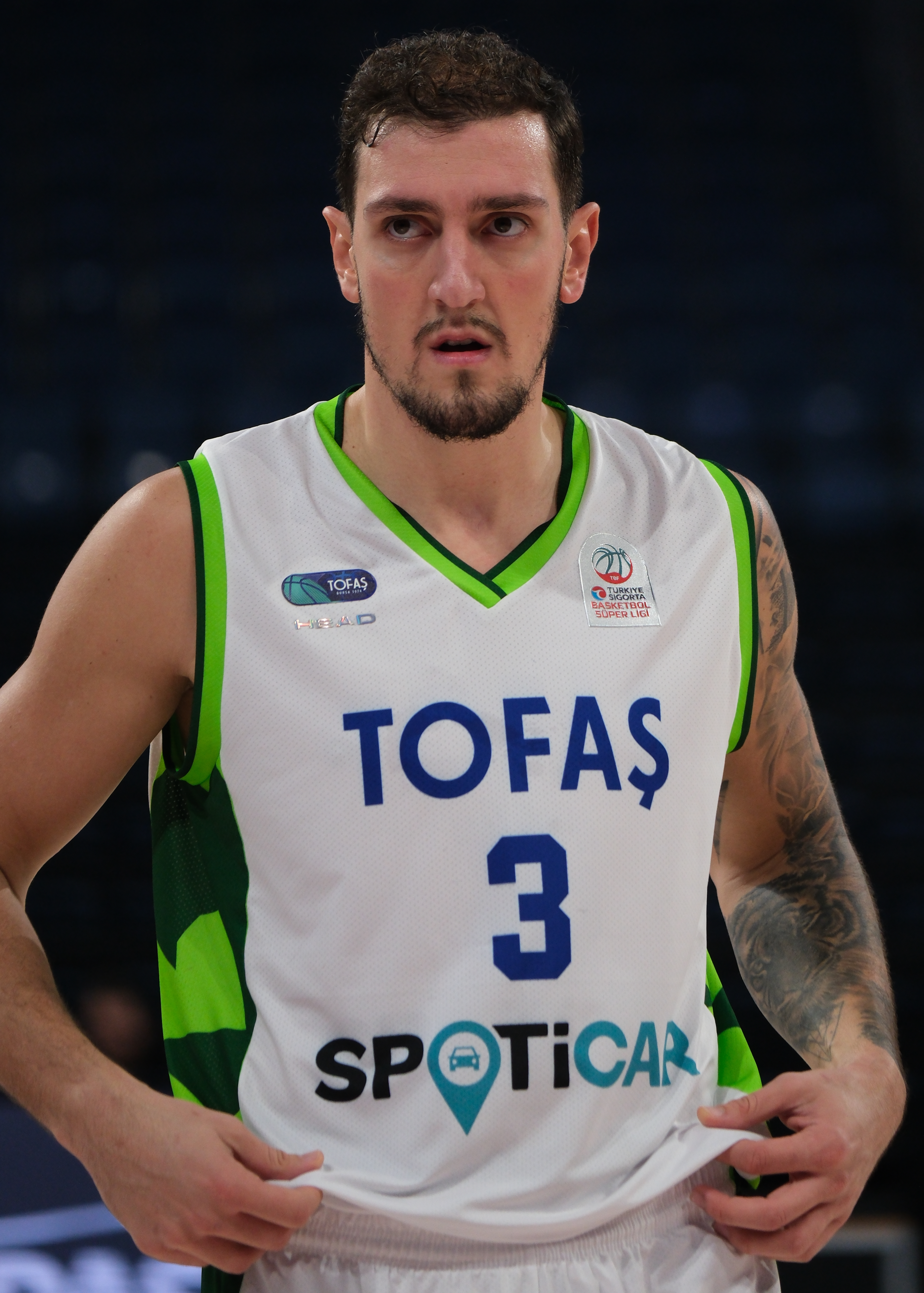

No. 3 – Tofaş
- Position: Power forward
- League: Basketbol Süper Ligi

Personal information
- Born: February 27, 1999 (age 27) Istanbul, Turkey
- Listed height: 6 ft 7 in (2.01 m)
- Listed weight: 191 lb (87 kg)

Career information
- Playing career: 2017–present

Career history
- 2017–2022: Anadolu Efes
- 2022–2023: Frutti Extra Bursaspor
- 2023–2024: Türk Telekom
- 2024–present: Tofaş

Career highlights
- 2× EuroLeague champion (2021, 2022); 2× Turkish League champion (2019, 2021); Turkish Cup winner (2022)

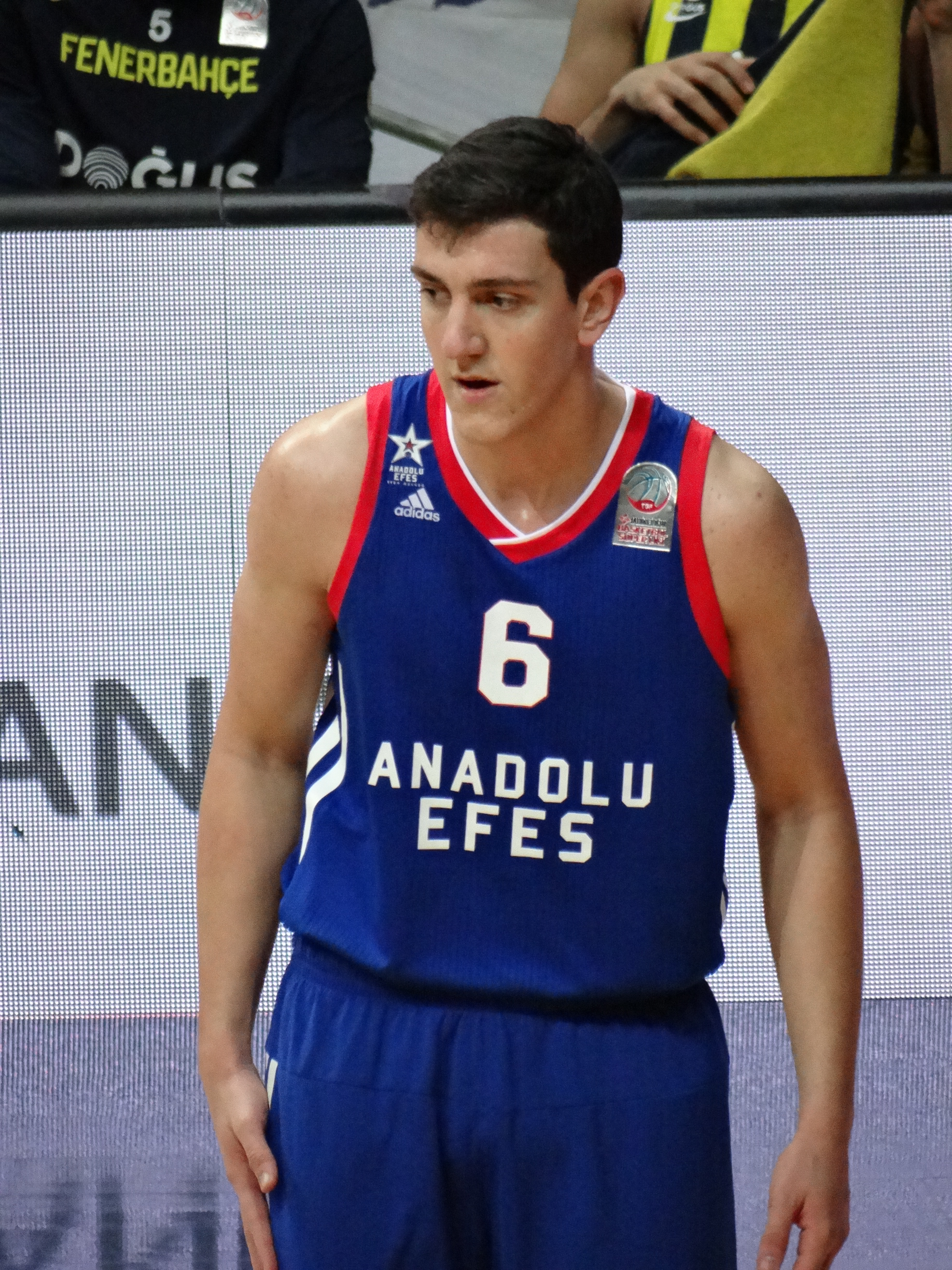

Yiğitcan Saybir (born February 27, 1999) is a Turkish professional basketball player for Tofaş of Basketbol Süper Ligi (BSL). He plays at the power forward position.

== Career statistics ==
Legend
GP	Games played	GS	Games started	MPG	Minutes per game
FG%	Field-goal percentage	3P%	3-point field-goal percentage	FT%	Free-throw percentage
RPG	Rebounds per game	APG	Assists per game	SPG	Steals per game
BPG	Blocks per game	PPG	Points per game	PIR	Performance index rating
**Bold**	Career high

=== EuroLeague ===
†	Denotes seasons in which Saybir won the EuroLeague

Year	Team	GP	GS	MPG	FG%	3P%	FT%	RPG	APG	SPG	BPG	PPG	PIR
2017–18	Anadolu Efes	**2**	0	**5.5**	.000	.000	—	.5	.5	—	—	0.0	-3.5
2019–20	Anadolu Efes	1	0	2.0	.000	—	—	**1.0**	**1.0**	—	—	0.0	-2.0
2020–21†	Anadolu Efes	**2**	0	2.0	**.333**	.000	—	.5	—	—	—	**1.0**	0.5
2021–22†	Anadolu Efes	1	0	1.0	—	—	—	—	—	—	—	0.0	**1.0**
Career		6	0	3.2	.111	.000	—	.3	.2	—	—	0.3	-1.2
