= Yılmaz Gündüz =

Turkish basketball player (1929–1997)

Personal information
- Nationality: Turkish
- Born: 2 January 1929; Tarsus, Mersin, Turkey
- Died: 1997 (aged 67–68)

Sport
- Sport: Basketball

Yılmaz Gündüz (2 January 1929 – 1997) was a Turkish basketball player. He competed in the men's tournament at the 1952 Summer Olympics.
