= Altan Dinçer =

Turkish basketball player (1932–2010)

Personal information
- Nationality: Turkish
- Born: 20 May 1932 Istanbul, Turkey
- Died: 12 January 2010 (aged 77) Istanbul, Turkey

Sport
- Sport: Basketball

Altan Dinçer (20 May 1932 – 12 January 2010) was a Turkish basketball player. He competed in the men's tournament at the 1952 Summer Olympics.
