= Devrim Cenk Ulusoy =

Turkish freediver and world record holder

- Born: 2 January 1973 (age 53); Niğde, Turkey
- Occupation: Free-diver

Devrim Cenk Ulusoy (born 2 January 1973) is a Turkish World record holder free-diver. Currently, he performs his underwater sport activities for Orta Doğu Teknik Üniversitesi Su Altı Sporları Kulübü (Middle East Technical University Underwater Sports Club).

== Personal life ==
Born on January 2, 1973, in Niğde, he was educated at Ortaköy Gazi Osman Paşa Secondary School between 1983 and 1986. He graduated from Kabataş High School in 1990. In 1991, Ulusoy enrolled in the Eastern Mediterranean University at Northern Cyprus to study mechanical engineering. He dropped out of university in his third (junior) year in 1997.

Ulusoy served in the military between 1998 and 2000. He got married in 2009, and has been living at Çanakkale since 2010, where he is studying physical education and sports at the Çanakkale Onsekiz Mart University.

== Sports career ==
Devrim Cenk Ulusoy began with water sports at Galatasaray Swimming's Kuruçeşme facility in Istanbul at the age of five as a therapy for his right arm, which was paralysed since age two due to a fall from a high chair. Following his two successive years champion titles in his age category, Ulusoy entered the club as a licensed member at the Galatasaray Kalamış Facilities. At the age of nine, Ulusoy was admitted to the Turkish national swimming team. He was not permitted to represent his country abroad because of his tattoos.

After three years of retirement, he returned to active sports entering monofin finswimming discipline. He won numerous national championship titles.

Ulusoy began free-diving in 2003. Since then, he set more than 20 national records, two official European records and eight World records. In addition, he owns many Turkish champion titles, and won one European and two World championships.

His sports career also includes activities as a swimming coach in the clubs of İstanbul Yüzme İhtisas, Yeşilköy Spor and Bakırköy Spor, as well as a tennis coach during his university years in Northern Cyprus.

== Selected records ==
- 159.54 m (523.4 ft) Jump Blue apnea with fins (at sea) WR in Antalya, Turkey on September 5, 2008
- 83.1 m (273 ft) Constant Weight with fins (at sea) WR in Tekirova, Kemer, Antalya Province, Turkey on October 26, 2008
- 80 m (260 ft) Free immersion apnea without fin (at sea) WR in Kaş, Antalya Province, Turkey on October 1, 2011
- 87 m (285 ft) Constant Weight with fins (at sea) in WR Kaş, Antalya Province, Turkey on October 2, 2011
- 81 m (266 ft) Free immersion apnea without fin (at sea) WR in Kaş, Antalya Province, Turkey on September 25, 2012
- 81 m (266 ft) Variable weight apnea without fin (at sea) WR in Kaş, Antalya Province, Turkey on September 26, 2012
