= Yalçın Granit =

Turkish basketball player (1932–2020)

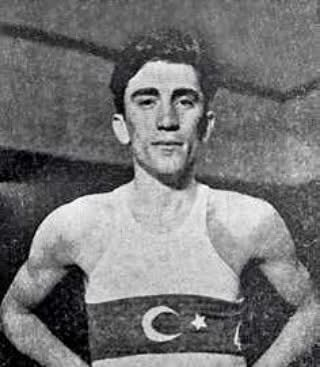

Personal information
- Born: 17 September 1932 Istanbul, Turkey
- Died: 1 November 2020 (aged 88)

Career information
- High school: Darüşşafaka High School
- Playing career: 1948–1957
- Coaching career: 1953–1984

Career history

Playing
- 1948–1955: Galatasaray
- 1955–1956: Racing Club Paris
- 1956–1957: Galatasaray

Coaching
- 1953–1954: Galatasaray
- 1957–1960: Darüşşafaka
- 1958–1960: Beyoğluspor
- 1960–1963: İTÜ
- 1960–1963: Turkey
- 1964–1965: Galatasaray
- 1967–1968: Galatasaray
- 1968: Turkey
- 1971–1974: Eczacıbaşı
- 1984: Galatasaray

Career highlights
- As player: 5× Turkish League champion (1949, 1950, 1953, 1955, 1956); 6× Istanbul Basketball League champion (1949–1954); As head coach: Turkish League champion (1964); 2× Istanbul Basketball League champion (1954, 1960); As executive: 2× Turkish League champion (1985, 1986)

Yalçın Granit (17 September 1932 – 1 November 2020) was a Turkish basketball player, coach, executive and sports journalist.

== Biography ==
He was born in Istanbul on 17 September 1932. Yalçın Granit, whose father died when he was a child, entered Darüşşafaka High School, an institution for orphans only, in the sixth grade. He played football in the school team, though he was directed to playing basketball.

At the age 17, he finished high school, and was transferred by Galatasaray Basketball through its club president Ali Sami Yen. At the Galatasaray team, which was nicknamed "The invincible Armada" (Turkish: Yenilmez Armada), he played many years and served also as their captain.

Following his graduation from Istanbul University's Faculty of Natural Sciences as a geologist, he went to France to pursue his doctoral studies. Granit joined the then world's-second-ranking team Racing Club Paris (now defunct after the merging of Paris Racing Basket with another club to form Paris-Levallois Basket in 2007) where he played briefly in the 1955–56 season, and was the first Turkish basketballer to play in a European team.

The same year as he began to play for the Galatasaray team, he was admitted to the Turkey national basketball team. He participated at the 1952 Summer Olympics in Helsinki, Finland and at FIBA EuroBasket tournaments in 1955 and 1957. He served for a long time as the national team's captain, and capped 68 times in total.

During all time at Galatasaray and the Turkish national team, he became the top scorer.

In 1958 at the age of 26, Granit became the coach of his high school team Darüşşafaka S.K., and led them in the 1959–60 to the championship title in the Istanbul Basketball League, their first and the only ever accomplishment. The team became runner-up in the Turkish Basketball League the same season. In the 1960–61 season, Darüşşafaka became Turkish champion with Granit as the head coach. He served also as the coach of the national team, and was named the "Most Successful Coach". In 1971, he was appointed by Şakir Eczacıbaşı technical director of the then-newly established basketball team Eczacıbaşı, and contributed to their first-place finishing in the Turkish Basketball First League's Istanbul Division in three consecutive years.

Granit presided over the basketball branch of the Galatasaray S.K. in 2002. He was a sports journalist at the daily newspapers Türkiye Spor (1960), Milliyet (1969–1999), Hürriyet (2003–2012) and Habertürk (2010). He is known for his contribution to the establishment of the basketball branch at Darüşşafaka in 1951, and his continuous efforts in their development.

Granit died on 1 November 2020. On 3 November, after funeral services at Darüşşafaka Ayhan Şahenk Sports Hall and Türk Telekom Stadium and prayers at Zincirlikuyu Mosque, his body was buried in Kilyos Cemetery.

== Bibliography ==
- Granit, Ali; Pekdoğru, Cem (2016). Adanmak: Bir Hayalin Peşinde Yalçın Granit ve Türk Basketbolunun Hikâyesi. Istanbul: Can Yayınları. ISBN 9789750731754.
