= Nejat Diyarbakırlı =

Turkish basketball player (1928–2017)

Personal information
- Nationality: Turkish
- Born: 17 June 1928
- Died: 14 July 2017 (aged 89)

Sport
- Sport: Basketball

Nejat Diyarbakırlı (17 June 1928 – 14 July 2017) was a Turkish basketball player. He competed in the men's tournament at the 1952 Summer Olympics.
