= Yüksel Alkan =

Turkish basketball player (1931–2017)

Personal information
- Full name: Mehmet Yüksel Alkan
- Nationality: Turkish
- Born: 1 May 1931
- Died: 23 November 2017 (aged 86)

Sport
- Sport: Basketball

Yüksel Alkan (1 May 1931 – 23 November 2017) was a Turkish basketball player. He competed in the men's tournament at the 1952 Summer Olympics.
