= Sacit Seldüz =

Turkish basketball player (1924–2018)

Personal information
- Nationality: Turkish
- Born: 2 January 1924
- Died: September 2018 (aged 94)

Sport
- Sport: Basketball

Sacit Seldüz (2 January 1924 – September 2018) was a Turkish basketball player. He competed in the men's tournament at the 1952 Summer Olympics.
