= Mehmet Ali Yalım =

Turkish basketball player

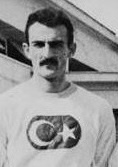

Personal information
- Nationality: Turkish
- Born: 1 April 1929
- Died: 28 January 1992 (aged 62)

Sport
- Sport: Basketball

Mehmet Ali Yalım (1 April 1929 – 28 January 1992) was a Turkish basketball player. He competed in the men's tournament at the 1952 Summer Olympics.
