= Erdoğan Partener =

Turkish basketball player (1929–1995)

Personal information
- Nationality: Turkish
- Born: 5 March 1929; Plovdiv, Bulgaria
- Died: 13 November 1995 (aged 66); Bonn, Germany

Sport
- Sport: Basketball

Erdoğan Partener (5 March 1929 – 13 November 1995) was a Turkish basketball player. He competed in the men's tournament at the 1952 Summer Olympics.
