= Basketball at the 1956 Summer Olympics – Men's team rosters =

Olympic basketball rosters

The following is the list of squads for each of the 15 teams that competed in the men's basketball tournament at the 1956 Summer Olympics.

== Group A ==
=== Japan ===
The following players represented Japan:

- Hiroshi Saito
- Hitoshi Konno
- Kenichi Imaizumi
- Manabu Fujita
- Reizo Ohira
- Riichi Arai
- Setsuo Nara
- Shutaro Shoji
- Takeo Sugiyama
- Takashi Itoyama
- Tetsuro Noborisaka

=== Philippines ===
The following players represented the Philippines:

- Tony Genato
- Antonio Villamor
- Carlos Badion
- Carlos Loyzaga
- Eddie Lim
- Leonardo Marquicias
- Loreto Carbonell
- Mariano Tolentino
- Martin Urra
- Rafael Barretto
- Ramón Manulat
- Ramón Campos

=== Thailand ===
The following players represented Thailand:

- Ampol Saranont
- Chalaw Sonthong
- Chan Sae-Lim
- Kirin Chavanwong
- Kuang Sae-Lim
- Mongkol Aimmanolrom
- Surakit Rukpanich
- Ta Sriratana
- Visit Chaicharoen

=== United States ===
The following players represented the United States:

- Carl Cain
- Bill Hougland
- K. C. Jones
- Bill Russell
- Jim Walsh
- Billy Evans
- Burdie Haldorson
- Ron Tomsic
- Dick Boushka
- Gib Ford
- Bob Jeangerard
- Chuck Darling

== Group B ==
=== Canada ===
The following players represented Canada:

- Bob Pickel
- Coulter Osborne
- Don Macintosh
- Doug Brinham
- Ed Lucht
- George Stulac
- John McLeod
- Ed Wild
- Mel Brown
- Bob Burtwell
- Ron Stuart
- Ron Bissett

=== France ===
The following players represented France:

- André Schlupp
- Christian Baltzer
- Gérard Sturla
- Henri Grange
- Henri Rey
- Robert Monclar
- Jean-Paul Beugnot
- Maurice Buffière
- Roger Antoine
- Roger Haudegand
- Roger Veyron
- Yves Gominon

=== Singapore ===
The following players represented Singapore:

- Chen Sho Fa
- Ho Lien Siew
- Jerome Henderson
- Ko Tai Chuen
- Lee Chak Men
- Ong Kiat Guan
- Wee Tian Siak
- Wong Kim Poh
- Yee Tit Kwan
- Yeo Gek Huat

=== Soviet Union ===
The following players represented the Soviet Union:

- Valdis Muižnieks
- Maigonis Valdmanis
- Vladimir Torban
- Stasys Stonkus
- Kazys Petkevičius
- Arkady Bochkaryov
- Jānis Krūmiņš
- Mikhail Semyonov
- Algirdas Lauritėnas
- Yury Ozerov
- Viktor Zubkov
- Mikhail Studenetsky

== Group C ==
=== Bulgaria ===
The following players represented Bulgaria:

- Atanas Atanasov
- Georgi Kanev
- Georgi Panov
- Iliya Mirchev
- Konstantin Totev
- Lyubomir Panov
- Nikolay Ilov
- Tsvetko Slavov
- Vasil Manchenko
- Viktor Radev
- Vladimir Savov

=== Formosa ===
The following players represented Taiwan:

- Chen Tsu-Li
- Chien Kok-Ching
- Hoo Cha-pen
- James Yap
- Lai Lam-kwong
- Ling Jing-huan
- Loo Hor-Kuay
- Tong Suet-fong
- Wang Yih-jiun
- Willie Chu
- Wu Yet-An
- Yung Pi-hock

=== South Korea ===
The following players represented South Korea:

- An Yeong-sik
- An Byeong-seok
- Jo Byeong-hyeon
- Choi Tae-gon
- Kim Chun-bae
- Kim Hyeong-il
- Kim Yeong-gi
- Kim Yeong-su
- Go Se-tae
- Baek Jeong-nam

=== Uruguay ===
The following players represented Uruguay:

- Carlos Blixen
- Ramiro Cortés
- Héctor Costa
- Nelson Chelle
- Nelson Demarco
- Héctor García
- Carlos González
- Sergio Matto
- Oscar Moglia
- Raúl Mera
- Ariel Olascoaga
- Milton Scaron

== Group D ==
=== Australia ===
The following players represented Australia:

- Algis Ignatavicius
- Bruce Flick
- Colin Burdett
- Geoff Heskett
- Inga Freidenfelds
- George Dancis
- Ken Finch
- Merv Moy
- Peter Bumbers
- Peter Demos
- Peter Sutton
- Stan Dargis

=== Brazil ===
The following players represented Brazil:

- Amaury
- Angelim
- Edson Bispo
- Fausto
- Jamil Gedeão
- Jorge Olivieri
- Zé Luiz
- Mayr Facci
- Nelson Lisboa
- Wilson Bombarda
- Wlamir Marques
- Algodão

=== Chile ===
The following players represented Chile:

- Hernán Raffo
- Juan Ostoic
- Luis Salvadores
- Maximiliano Garafulic
- Orlando Etcheberrigaray
- Orlando Silva
- Pedro Araya
- Raúl Urra
- Rolando Etchepare
- Rufino Bernedo
- Victor Mahaña
