= Singapore at the 1956 Summer Olympics =

- IOC code: SGP (SIN used at these Games)
- NOC: Singapore National Olympic Council

in Melbourne/Stockholm
- Competitors: 52 in 6 sports
- Flag bearer: Lionel Chee
- Medals: Gold 0 Silver 0 Bronze 0 Total 0

Summer Olympics appearances (overview)
- 1948; 1952; 1956; 1960; 1964; 1968; 1972; 1976; 1980; 1984; 1988; 1992; 1996; 2000; 2004; 2008; 2012; 2016; 2020; 2024

Other related appearances
- Malaysia (1964)

Singapore competed at the 1956 Summer Olympics held in Melbourne, Australia. While still a colony, fifty-two competitors were sent to participate across six sports. This was the third time Singapore had participated in the Summer Olympics and they won no medals. Most of the athletes did not advance past the qualifying rounds of their sports, with weightlifter Tan Ser Cher being the only Singaporean athlete to finish in the top ten.

== Background ==
The Colony of Singapore competed at the Summer Olympic Games for the third time in 1956. Singapore received 85 sports handbooks, 5 per sport, from the International Olympic Committee (IOC). The sports handbooks were in English, from a choice of either English, French, or Spanish. When the Singaporean delegation arrived in Melbourne, their Olympic attaché was S. L. Guilfoyle.

Singapore, alongside Malaya (present-day Malaysia), provided the Olympic Village with some Malay cooks. To help with broadcasting the Olympics to Europe, two of the British Broadcasting Corporation's high-powered short-wave transmitters situated in Singapore were used by Radio Australia.

== Competitors ==
The delegation consisted of sixty-four people, sixty men and four women, and they arrived in the Olympic Village in Heidelberg sometime between 11 and 17 November. At the Village, Singapore had two separate blocks, one for men and women which were located in the northern and southern areas respectively. With kitchens cooking separately for nations of "similar eating habits", the Singaporean delegation was grouped in the western side of the dining hall with China, Hong Kong, Philippines, South Korea, Thailand, and Vietnam.

The official report by the IOC states that forty-five Singaporeans competed; in reality, fifty-two Singaporeans actually competed. This was the first time the Singapore men's national field hockey team, men's national basketball team, and men's national water polo team participated in the Olympics.

Sport	Men	Women	Total
Athletics	2	2	4
Basketball	10	0	10 (Note: In official reports, the Singaporean basketball team is stated to have only 10 members. Sy Kee Chao is not included in the total.)
Hockey	13	0	13 (Note: In official reports, the Singaporean field hockey team is stated to have only 13 members. 18 members actually participated.)
Water polo	10	0	10 (Note: In official reports, the Singaporean water polo team is stated to have only 10 members. Tan Eng Liang is not included in the total.)
Weightlifting	3	0	3
Yachting	5	0	5
Total	43	2	45 (Note: The actual number of Singaporean competitors is 52.)

== Athletics ==
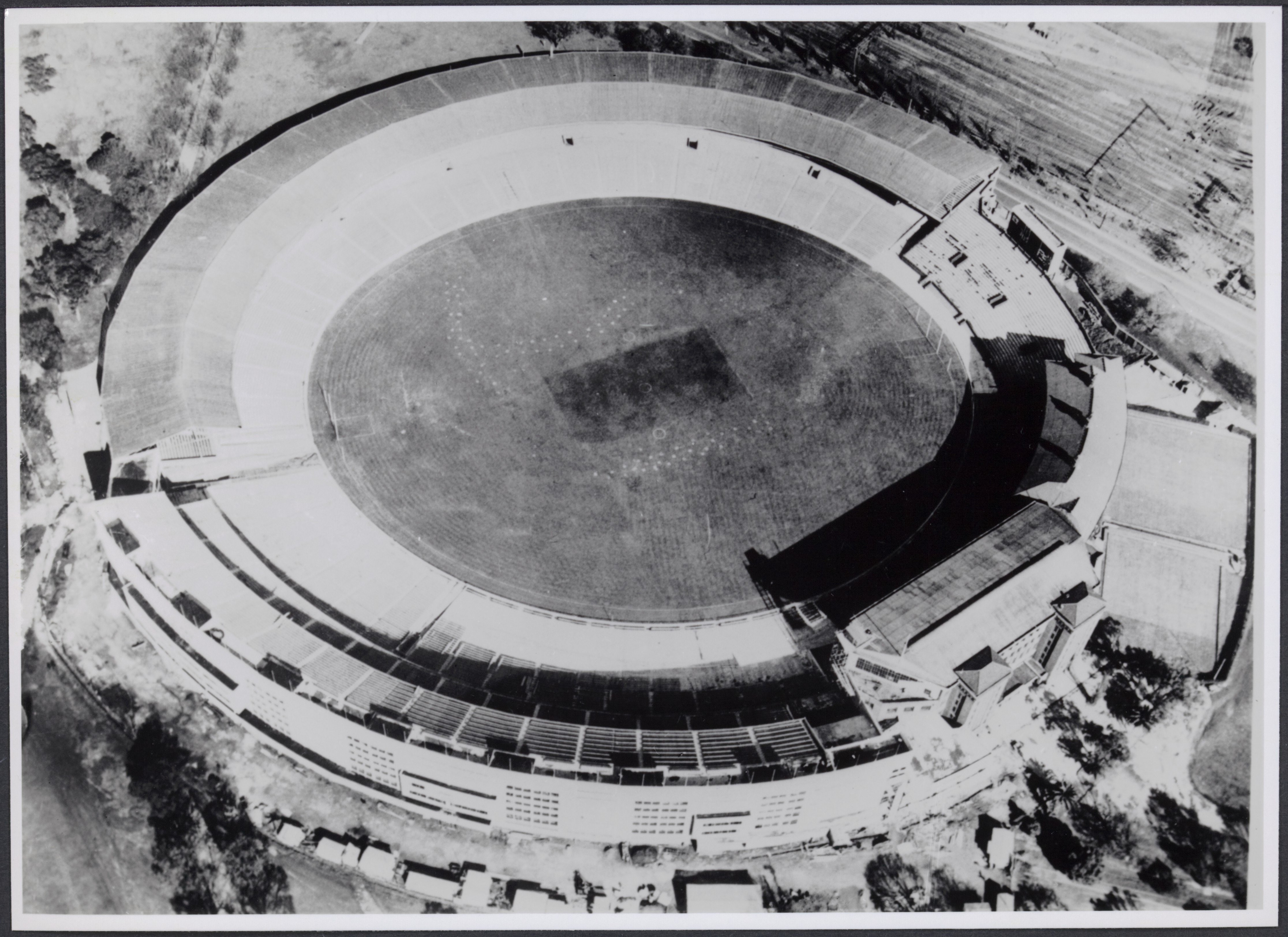
The Melbourne Cricket Ground, pictured during the Summer Olympics, where the athletics were held.

Four athletes represented Singapore at three different events from 23 November to 1 December at the Melbourne Cricket Ground. In September, the Singapore Amateur Athletics Association (SAAA) recommended Janet Jesudason, Mary Klass, and Tan Eng Yoon to the Singapore Olympic and Sports Council (SOSC) for participation in the upcoming Summer Olympics. Among these three, Klass was the only one considered to gain approval to compete, whilst Jesudason and Tan were considered more unlikely.

Initially, Kesavan Soon was not among those chosen to represent Singapore at the Olympics as he failed to make the SAAA's qualifying standard. However, the SAAA recommended Tan despite the fact he was in England at the time and was unable to take any qualifying standard, along with the fact that Kesavan was considered a "promising athlete". Another factor was that it would cost S$4,000 to send Tan to Melbourne from England while it would only cost about S$2,000 to send Kesavan from Singapore. In October, the SAAA decided to recommend Kesavan to the SOSC as he managed to pass the qualifying standard. Later that month, Jesudason, Klass, Tan, and Kesavan were all approved by the SOSC. Jesudason, Klass, and Kesavan practiced on a cinder track in Farrer Park.

Originally, Tan was planned to only compete in the triple jump but was told upon his arrival to Singapore from England that he would have to run the men's 100 metres as well. He stated that he "thought I was only required to compete in the triple jump, and so have not prepared myself for running." He also said that he had little opportunity to train in England due to poor weather conditions. He later left for Melbourne with a British delegation rather than the Singapore delegation, who left later that day.

=== Track & road events ===
Jesudason and Klass competed in the first round of the women's 100 metres event. Jesudason placed fifth in the first heat with a time of 13.2 while Klass placed seventh in the second heat at 12.6. As only the top two placers of each first round heat advanced, neither Jesudason or Klass managed to advance. Kesavan and Tan competed in the first round of the men's 100 metres event. Kesavan placed fourth in the fourth heat at 11.4 while Tan placed fourth in the ninth heat with the same time; neither managed to advance. Kesavan also competed in the men's 200 metres event, where the same qualifying rule of the top two placers in each first round heat was applied. He was unsuccessful in advancing with his time of 23.0, placing him fifth in the eighth heat.

Athlete	Event	Heat		Quarterfinal		Semifinal		Final	
Athlete	Event	Result	Rank	Result	Rank	Result	Rank	Result	Rank
Janet Jesudason	Women's 100 metres	13.2	5	did not advance					
Mary Klass	Women's 100 metres	12.6	7	did not advance					
Kesavan Soon	Men's 100 metres	11.4	4	did not advance					
Kesavan Soon	Men's 200 metres	23.0	5	did not advance					
Tan Eng Yoon	Men's 100 metres	11.4	4	did not advance					

=== Field events ===
Tan also competed in the qualifying round for the triple jump event, which was then known as hop, step, and jump. To advance, the qualifying distance of 14.8 metres had to be reached within three attempts. Tan was unable to qualify for the finals.

Athlete	Event	Qualification		Final	
Athlete	Event	Distance	Position	Distance	Position
Tan Eng Yoon	Triple jump	No mark	X	did not advance	

== Basketball ==
- Sy Kee Chao
- Chen Sho Fa
- Henderson Jerome
- Ho Lien Siew
- Ko Tai Chuen
- Lee Chak Men
- Ong Kiat Guan
- Wee Tian Siak
- Wong Kim Poh
- Yee Tit Kwan
- Yeo Gek Huat

== Field hockey ==
- Abdullah Hamid
- Ajit Singh Gill
- Arumugam Vijiaratnam
- Burdette Mathew Coutts
- Chai Hon Yam
- Devadas Vellupillai
- Edward Nobel Pillai
- Edwin Jeyaceilan Doraisamy
- Fred Fernandez
- Michael George Wright
- Osbert John de Rozario
- Percy Milton Pennefather
- Roy Sharma
- Roland Schoon
- Rudolf William Mosbergen
- S. Jeyathurai
- Sinnadurai Vellupillai
- William Douglas Hay

== Sailing ==
- Kenneth Golding
- Robert Ho
- Ned Holiday
- Keith Johnson
- Jack Snowden

== Water polo ==
- Tan Eng Liang
- Chee Lionel
- Gan Eng Teck
- Lim Ting Kiang David
- Lim Teck Pan
- Oh Chwee Hock
- Tan Eng Bock
- Thio Gim Hock
- Alexander Wolters
- Wiebe Wolters
- Yeo Oon Tat Eric

== Weightlifting ==
- Tan Howe Liang
- Tan Ser Cher (7th place)
- Wong Kay Poh
