= South Korea at the 1956 Summer Olympics =

- IOC code: KOR
- NOC: Korean Olympic Committee

in Melbourne/Stockholm
- Competitors: 35 in 7 sports
- Medals Ranked 29th: Gold 0 Silver 1 Bronze 1 Total 2

Summer Olympics appearances (overview)
- 1948; 1952; 1956; 1960; 1964; 1968; 1972; 1976; 1980; 1984; 1988; 1992; 1996; 2000; 2004; 2008; 2012; 2016; 2020; 2024

South Korea, as Korea, competed at the 1956 Summer Olympics in Melbourne, Australia. 35 competitors, all men, took part in 23 events in 7 sports.

== Medalists ==
Medal	Name	Sport	Event	Date
Silver	Song Soon-chun	Boxing	Men's Bantamweight	1 December
Bronze	Kim Chang-Hee	Weightlifting	Men's Lightweight	24 November

== Athletics ==
=== Track and road ===
Event	Athletes	Heat		Semifinal		Final	
Event	Athletes	Result	Rank	Result	Rank	Result	Rank
Men's 800 metres	Sim Sang-Ok	1:55.5	6 (H4)	Did not advance			
Men's 1500 metres	Sim Sang-Ok	4:09.0	13 (H2)	Did not advance			
Men's marathon	Lee Chang-Hoon					2:28:45	4
Men's marathon	Choi Chung-Sik					2:36:53	12
Men's marathon	Im Hwa-Dong					Did not finish	-

=== Field ===
Event	Athletes	Qualification		Final	
Event	Athletes	Result (m)	Rank	Result	Rank
Men's long jump	Seo Yeong-Ju	7.09	18	Did not advance	
Men's triple jump	Choi Yeong-Gi	14.86	20 Q	14.65	21
Men's hammer throw	Song Gyo-Sik	53.74	16	Did not advance	

== Basketball ==
=== Group round ===
TEAM	PTS	P	W	L	PF	PA
Uruguay	6	3	3	0	238	187
Bulgaria	5	3	2	1	242	199
Republic of China	4	3	1	2	216	249
South Korea	3	3	0	3	194	255

- China 83-76 Korea
- Bulgaria 89-58 Korea
- Uruguay 83-60 Korea

=== Classification 9-15 ===
==== Group 2 (9-15) ====
TEAM	PTS	P	W	L	PF	PA
Canada	4	2	2	0	147	123
Japan	3	2	1	1	143	140
South Korea	0	2	0	2	130	157

- Canada 74-63 Korea
- Japan 83-67 Korea

==== Classification 13-15 ====
Thailand's loss gave the nation 15th place.

- Korea 61-47 Thailand
- Singapore, BYE

==== Classification 13/14 ====
- Singapore 92-79 Korea

Korea's final ranking was 14th.

=== Squad ===
An Yeong-sik, An Byeong-seok, Jo Byeong-hyeon, Choi Tae-gon, Kim Chun-bae, Kim Hyeong-il, Kim Yeong-gi, Kim Yeong-su, Go Se-tae, Baek Jeong-nam

== Boxing ==
Athlete	Event	Round of 32	Round of 16	Quarterfinals	Semifinals	Final	
Athlete	Event	Opposition Result	Opposition Result	Opposition Result	Opposition Result	Opposition Result	Rank
Pyo Hyeon-Gi	Flyweight		Libeer (FRA); L by points	Did not advance			
Song Sun-Cheon	Bantamweight	Adela (PHI); W by points	Bath (AUS); W by points	Tomaselli (ARG); W by points	Barrientos (CHI); W by points	Behrendt (EUA); L by points	Silver
Jeong Do-Hun	Featherweight		Zachara (TCH); L by points	Did not advance			
Baek Do-Seon	Lightweight		Vairolatto (FRA); L by retired	Did not advance			
Hwang Eui-Kyung	Light-Welterweight		de los Santos (PHI); W by disqualified	Dumitrescu (ROU); L by points	Did not advance		

== Cycling ==
=== Road competition ===
Athlete	Event	Time	Rank
Kim Ho-Soon	Individual road race	5:34:37	37
Im Sang-Jo	Individual road race	Did not finish	-

== Shooting ==
Two shooters represented South Korea in 1956.

Men

Athlete	Event	Final	
Athlete	Event	Points	Rank
Chu Hwa-il	300 m rifle three positions	903	19
Kim Yun-gi	50 m pistol	463	30

== Weightlifting ==
Men

Athlete	Event	Press		Snatch		Clean & jerk		Total	Rank
Athlete	Event	Result	Rank	Result	Rank	Result	Rank	Total	Rank
Yu In-Ho	Bantamweight (-56 kg)	90	5	95	5T	135	1	320	4
Kim Hae-Nam	Bantamweight (-56 kg)	85	10	95	5T	127.5	4	307.5	5
Lee Kyung-Seop	Featherweight (-60 kg)	90	16	95	8	127.5	4T	312.5	8
Kim Chang-Hui	Lightweight (-67.5 kg)	107.5	11	112.5	7	150	1T	370	3
Kim Seong-Jip	Middleweight (-75 kg)	125	2	110	11	145	6	380	5
Park Dong-Cheol	Middle-Heavyweight (-90 kg)	120	12	0	-	-	-	120	15

== Wrestling ==
Men's Freestyle

Athlete	Event	Round 1	Round 2	Round 3	Round 4	Round 5	Final
Athlete	Event	Opposition Result	Opposition Result	Opposition Result	Opposition Result	Opposition Result	Opposition Result
Lee Jeong-Gyu	Flyweight (−52 kg)	Abdul (PAK); W by fall	Daware (IND); L 0-3				
Lee Sang-Gyun	Bantamweight (−57 kg)	Ramel (PHI); W by fall	Zahur (PAK); W 2-1	Bye	Iizuka (JPN); L 0-3		
Oh Tae-Keun	Lightweight (−67 kg)	Ashraf (PAK); L by fall					
