= Thailand at the 1956 Summer Olympics =

- IOC code: THA
- NOC: National Olympic Committee of Thailand

in Melbourne/Stockholm
- Medals: Gold 0 Silver 0 Bronze 0 Total 0

Summer Olympics appearances (overview)
- 1952; 1956; 1960; 1964; 1968; 1972; 1976; 1980; 1984; 1988; 1992; 1996; 2000; 2004; 2008; 2012; 2016; 2020; 2024; 2028

Thailand competed at the 1956 Summer Olympics in Melbourne, Australia, represented by 35 male competitors.

It was the first time that the Thailand national football team and the Thailand national basketball team joined the Olympics.

== Results by event ==
=== Athletics ===
Men's 100 metres

- Paiboon Vacharapan (eliminated in round 1, heat 12)
- Vanchak Voradilok (eliminated in round 1, heat 2)
- Sneh Wongchaoom (eliminated in round 1, heat 11)

Men's 200 metres

- Paiboon Vacharapan (eliminated in round 1, heat 12)
- Manut Bumrungphuk (eliminated in round 1, heat 3)
- Montri Srinaka (eliminated in round 1, heat 11)

Men's 400 metres

- Somsak Thonf Ar-Ram (eliminated in round 1, heat 4)

Men's 800 metres

- Phoi Jaiswang (eliminated in round 1, heat 2)

Men's 1500 metres

- Somnuek Srisombat (eliminated in round 1, heat 11)
- DNS: Phoi Jaiswang

Men's 4 × 100 metres relay

- Vanchak Voradilok, Paiboon Vacharapan, Montri Srinaka, Sneh Wongchaoom (eliminated in round 1, heat 2)
- DNS: Manut Bumrungphuk, Somnuek Srisombat

=== Basketball ===
- Ampol Saranont, Chalaw Sonthong, Chan Sae-Lim, Kirin Chavanwong, Kuang Sae-Lim, Mongkol Aimmanolrom, Surakit Rukpanich, Ta Sriratana, Visit Chaicharoen (15th place)

DNS: Kum Sailee, Sopon Julmanichoti, Vichit Imnoi

=== Boxing ===
Men's Flyweight

- Phajol Muangson (=9th place)

Men's Bantamweight

- Vichai Limcharoen (=9th place)

Men's Featherweight

- Nontasilp Thayansilp (=9th place)

Men's Lightweight

- Sueb Chundakowsolaya (=9th place)

Men's Light welterweight

- Chune Pattapong (=17th place)

=== Football ===
- Bumphen Luttimol, Kasem Baikam, Prasan Suvannasith, Prateep Chermudhai, Sophon Hayachanta, Sukit Chitranukhroh, Samruay Chaiyong, Surapong Chutimawong, Suchart Mutugun, Vivathana Milinthachinda, Wanchai Suvaree (9th place)

DNS: Nit Sriyabhaya, Tu Suwanit

=== Sailing ===
Star

- Prince Birabongse Bhanudej also known as Prince Bira (THA) and Luang Pradiyat Navayudh (12th place).
