= Uruguay at the 1956 Summer Olympics =

- IOC code: URU
- NOC: Uruguayan Olympic Committee

in Melbourne/Stockholm
- Competitors: 21 in 5 sports
- Flag bearer: Héctor Costa
- Medals Ranked 35th: Gold 0 Silver 0 Bronze 1 Total 1

Summer Olympics appearances (overview)
- 1924; 1928; 1932; 1936; 1948; 1952; 1956; 1960; 1964; 1968; 1972; 1976; 1980; 1984; 1988; 1992; 1996; 2000; 2004; 2008; 2012; 2016; 2020; 2024; 2028

Uruguay competed at the 1956 Summer Olympics in Melbourne, Australia. 21 competitors, all men, took part in 8 events in 5 sports.

== Medalists ==
=== Bronze ===
- Oscar Moglia, Ariel Olascoaga, Milton Scarón, Carlos Gonzáles, Sergio Matto, Raúl Mera, Héctor Costa, Nelson Demarco, Héctor Garcia, Carlos Blixen, Nelson Chelle, and Ramiro Cortes — Basketball, Men's Team Competition

== Athletics ==
- Fermín Donazar

== Basketball ==
- Carlos Blixen
- Ramiro Cortes
- Héctor Costa
- Nelson Chelle
- Nelson Demarco
- Héctor García Otero
- Carlos González
- Sergio Matto
- Oscar Moglia
- Raúl Mera
- Ariel Olascoaga
- Milton Scaron

== Cycling ==
Time trial

- Luis Pedro Serra — 1:12.3 (→ 5th place)

Team pursuit

- Alberto Velázquez
  Eduardo Puertollano
  Luis Pedro Serra
  René Deceja — 14th place
  Also part of the team were Rodolfo Rodino and Alberto Domínguez

Individual road race

- René Deceja — 5:31:58 (→ 33rd place)
- Alberto Velázquez — did not finish (→ no ranking)
- Eduardo Puertollano — did not finish (→ no ranking)
- Raymundo Moyano — did not finish (→ no ranking)

== Fencing ==
One fencer represented Uruguay in 1956.

Men's sabre

- Teodoro Goliardi

== Rowing ==
Uruguay had two male rowers participate in one out of seven rowing events in 1956.

Men's double sculls

- Paulo Carvalho
- Miguel Seijas
