= Republic of China at the 1956 Summer Olympics =

- Flag of the Republic of China
- IOC code: ROC (RCF used at these Games)
- NOC: Chinese Olympic Committee (Note: See Chinese Olympic Committee#Timeline concerning Olympic recognition and Chinese Taipei Olympic Committee#History.)

in Melbourne/Stockholm
- Competitors: 20 in 5 sports
- Medals: Gold 0 Silver 0 Bronze 0 Total 0

Summer Olympics appearances (overview)
- 1956; 1960; 1964; 1968; 1972; 1976–1980; 1984; 1988; 1992; 1996; 2000; 2004; 2008; 2012; 2016; 2020; 2024; 2028

Other related appearances
- China (1952–pres.); Chinese Taipei (1956–pres.)

The Republic of China (Taiwan) competed at the 1956 Summer Olympics in Melbourne, Australia as the Republic of China, Formosa. Athletes from this nation nowadays compete under the name Chinese Taipei (TPE). Twenty competitors, all men, took part in thirteen events in five sports.

== Athletics ==
Key

- Note–Ranks given for track events are within the athlete's heat only
- Q = Qualified for the next round
- q = Qualified for the next round as a fastest loser or, in field events, by position without achieving the qualifying target
- NR = National record
- N/A = Round not applicable for the event
- Bye = Athlete not required to compete in round

=== Track and road events ===
Athlete	Event	Quarterfinal		Semifinal		Final	
Athlete	Event	Result	Rank	Result	Rank	Result	Rank
Tsai Cheng-Fu	Men's 400 m hurdles	54.6	26	Did not advance			
Wu Chun-Tsai	Men's decathlon	—				DNS	—
Yang Chuan-Kwang.	Men's decathlon	—				6521	8

=== Field events ===
Athlete	Event	Qualification		Final	
Athlete	Event	Result	Rank	Result	Rank
Yang Chuan-Kwang.	Men's high jump	1.92	7	1.86	20
Wu Chun-Tsai	Men's triple jump	14.36	26	Did not advance	
Ling Te-Sheng	Men's long jump	7.11	16	Did not advance	

== Basketball ==
The Republic of China competed against teams from Australia, Singapore, Thailand, Japan, Korea, Uruguay, and Bulgaria, finishing the games ranked in 11th place.

=== Squad ===
- Chen Tsu-Li
- Chien Kok-Ching
- Hoo Cha-Pen
- James Yap
- Lai Lam-Kwong
- Ling Jing-Huan
- Loo Hor-Kuay
- Tong Suet-Fong
- Wang Yih-Jiun
- Willie Chu
- Wu Yet-An
- Yung Pi-Hock

=== Group Stage ===
Pos	Team	Pld	W	L	PF	PA	PD	Pts	Qualification
1	Uruguay	3	3	0	238	187	+51	6	Quarterfinals
2	Bulgaria	3	2	1	242	199	+43	5	Quarterfinals
3	Formosa	3	1	2	216	249	−33	4	9th–15th classification round
4	South Korea	3	0	3	194	255	−61	3	9th–15th classification round

Source: FIBA archive
Rules for classification: 1) points; 2) head-to-head points; 3) head-to-head goal average; 4) head-to-head number of points scored.

22 November
20:00

South Korea	76–83	Formosa
Scoring by half: 28–42, 48–41

Royal Exhibition Building, Melbourne

24 November
10:30

Uruguay	85–62	Formosa
Scoring by half: 39–36, 46–26

Royal Exhibition Building, Melbourne

26 November
10:30

Formosa	71–88	Bulgaria
Scoring by half: 35–47, 36–41

Royal Exhibition Building, Melbourne

=== Classification 9-16 ===
Pos	Team	Pld	W	L	PF	PA	PD	Pts	Qualification
1	Formosa	3	3	0	218	189	+29	6	9th–12th classification playoffs
2	Australia (H)	3	2	1	258	208	+50	5	9th–12th classification playoffs
3	Singapore	3	1	2	200	215	−15	4	13th–16th classification playoffs
4	Thailand	3	0	3	150	214	−64	3	13th–16th classification playoffs

Source: FIBA archive
Rules for classification: 1) points; 2) head-to-head points; 3) head-to-head goal average; 4) head-to-head number of points scored.
(H) Hosts

Singapore	64–67	Formosa
Scoring by half: 23–26, 41–41

Australia	73–86	Formosa
Scoring by half: 40–39, 33–47

Formosa	65–52	Thailand
Scoring by half: 35–31, 30–21

=== Classification 9–12 ===
Classification Semifinals
1 December
Formosa	61
Japan	82
1 December
Australia	38
Canada	83

Ninth-place match
1 December
Japan	60
Canada	75
Eleventh-place match
1 December
Formosa	87
Australia	70

== Boxing ==
Men's Welterweight

- Lee Shih-Chuan

== Shooting ==
One shooter represented the Republic of China in 1956.

300 m rifle, three positions

- Wu Tao-yan

50 m rifle, three positions

- Wu Tao-yan

50 m rifle, prone

- Wu Tao-yan

== Weightlifting ==
Men's Bantamweight

- Song Re-Nado

Men's Featherweight

- Lim Jose-Ning

Men's Middleweight

- Ko Bu-Beng
