= Dorta =

Dorta is both a given name and a surname. Notable people with the name include:

- Dorta Jagić (born 1974), Croatian poet and writer
- Diego Dorta (born 1971), Uruguayan football player
- Edneusa Dorta (born 1976), Brazilian Paralympic athlete
- Felipe Dorta (born 1996), Austrian footballer
- Manuel Dorta-Duque (1896–1964), Cuban politician
- Melvin Dorta (born 1982), Venezuelan baseball player

== See also ==
- Jorge Carlos Dortas Olivieri (1931–1966), Brazilian basketball player
