= Tetsurō =

- Gender: Male

Origin
- Origin: Japanese
- Meaning: Different meanings depending on the kanji used

Tetsurō, Tetsuro, Tetsurou or Tetsuroh (written: 哲郎, 哲朗, 鉄郎, 徹郎 or テツロー in katakana) is a masculine Japanese given name. Notable people with the name include:

- Tetsuro Aikawa (相川 哲郎; born 1954), Japanese businessman
- Tetsurō Amino (アミノ テツロー; born 1955), Japanese anime director
- Tetsurō Araki (荒木 哲郎; born 1976), Japanese anime director
- Tetsurō Degawa (出川 哲朗; born 1964), Japanese comedian
- Tetsuro Fukuyama (福山 哲郎; born 1962), Japanese politician
- Tetsurō Itodani (糸谷 哲郎; born 1988), Japanese shogi player
- Tetsuro Matsuzawa (松沢 哲郎; born 1950), Japanese primatologist
- Tetsuro Miura (三浦 哲郎; born 1956), Japanese footballer and manager
- Tetsuro Nariyama (成山 哲郎; born 1947), Japanese aikidoka
- Tetsuro Noborisaka (登坂 哲朗; 1934–1978), Japanese basketball player
- Tetsuro Nomura (野村 哲郎; born 1943), Japanese politician
- Tetsurō Oda (織田 哲郎; born 1958), Japanese composer, record producer and singer-songwriter
- Tetsuro Ota (太田 徹郎; born 1989), Japanese footballer
- Tetsurō Sagawa (瑳川 哲朗; born 1937), Japanese actor and voice actor
- Tetsuro Shigematsu, Canadian radio broadcaster and comedian
- Tetsuro Shimizu (清水 徹郎; born 1988), Japanese curler
- Tetsurō Tamba (丹波 哲郎; 1922–2006), Japanese actor
- Tetsuro Uki (浮氣 哲郎; born 1971), Japanese footballer and manager
- Tetsuro Watsuji (和辻 哲郎; 1889–1960), Japanese moral philosopher, cultural historian, and intellectual historian
- Tetsuro Yano (矢野 哲朗; born 1946), Japanese politician
- Tetsuro Yoshida (吉田 鉄郎; 1894–1956), Japanese architect

== Fictional characters ==
- Tetsuro Hoshino (星野 鉄郎), protagonist of the manga series Galaxy Express 999
- Tetsurō Kuroo (黒尾 鉄朗), a character in the manga series Haikyu!! with the position of captain and middle blocker from Nekoma High

== See also ==
- 17501 Tetsuro, a main-belt asteroid
