= General Political Department =

General Political Department (GPD) may refer to:

- People's Liberation Army General Political Department, chief political organ under the Central Military Commission of the Chinese Communist Party
- Vietnam People's Army General Political Department of the Vietnam People's Army
- Former name of Political Warfare Bureau of Taiwan
