= Jagić =

Jagić is a Croatian surname. Notable people with the surname include:

- Vatroslav Jagić (1838–1923), Croatian philologist
- Dorta Jagić (born 1974), Croatian poet and writer

== See also ==
- Janić
