= 2018 Letran Knights basketball team =

Basketball team in the Philippines

2018 Letran Knights men's basketball

NCAA Season 94 semifinalist

Record
- Elims rank: #3
- Final rank: #3
- 2018 record: 13–6 (13–5 elims)
- Head coach: Jeff Napa (3rd season)
- Assistant coaches: Leo Pujante; Jay Agleron; Chico Manabat; Robert Joseph Guevarra
- Captain: Bong Quinto (5th season)

The 2018 Letran Knights men's basketball team represented Colegio de San Juan de Letran in the 94th season of the National Collegiate Athletic Association in the Philippines. The men's basketball tournament for the school year 2018-19 began on July 7, 2018, and the host school for the season was the University of Perpetual Help System DALTA.

The Knights finished the double round-robin eliminations at third place with 13 wins against 5 losses. They went on to the Final Four for the first time in three years since winning their 17th championship in the 91st season, but got eliminated by the second-seed Lyceum Pirates, who had a twice-to-beat advantage over them.

Outgoing Knight and team captain Bong Quinto was named one of the Mythical Five members and Larry Muyang bagged the Rookie of the Year award.

== Roster ==
Letran Knights roster
Players
Coaches

Pos.	No.	Nat.	Name	Height	Year	High School
C	1	(Philippines)	Muyang, Larry L.	6'5" (1.96m)	1st	San Isidro High School
PG	2	(Philippines)	Yu, Fran Louie Y.	5'10" (1.78m)	1st	Chiang Kai-shek College
SG	7	(Philippines)	Balanza, Jerrick G. (injured)	6'2" (1.88m)	4th	Colegio de San Juan de Letran
PG	8	(Philippines)	Calvo, John Paul (injured)	6'0" (1.83m)	4th	Hua Siong College of Iloilo
PG	9	(Philippines)	Celis, Jason C.	6'6" (1.98m)	1st	Chiang Kai-shek College
PF	10	(Philippines)	Fajarito, Christian A.	6'5" (1.96m)	3rd	FEU Diliman
SG	11	(Philippines)	Agbong, Evan Jose C.	6'2" (1.88m)	1st	Chiang Kai-shek College
SG	12	(Philippines)	Taladua, Jeremiah M.	5'10" (1.78m)	4th	–
C	15	(Philippines)	Balagasay, Christian L.	6'6" (1.98m)	4th	Northridge Montessori School
PF	16	(Philippines)	Bañez, Shamasneh B.	6'3" (1.91m)	1st	Chiang Kai-shek College
PF	18	(Philippines)	Ambohot, Jeo R.	6'7" (2.01m)	3rd	Agro-Industrial Foundation College of the Philippines
SG	19	(Philippines)	Quinto, Kier John R. (C)	6'2" (1.88m)	5th	Colegio de San Juan de Letran
F	24	(Philippines)	Mandreza, Alexander S.	6'1" (1.85m)	2nd	Del Monte National High School
SG	35	(Philippines)	Batiller, Edson A.	6'0" (1.83m)	1st	–
SG	36	(Philippines)	Galvelo, Nicolo V.	6'1" (1.85m)	1st	Sacred Heart Academy of Novaliches
SG	Reserved	(Philippines)	Pambid, Gay Lord Jap M.	6'2" (1.88m)	–	–
C	Reserved	(Philippines)	Pascual, Daryl Louie	6'5" (1.96m)	–	Arellano University

Head coach

- Jeff Napa

Assistant coach(es)

- Leo Pujante
- Jay Agleron
- Chico Manabat
- Robert Joseph Guevarra

Team manager

- Waiyip Chong
- Bonnie Tan

Legend

- (C) Team captain
- Injured

=== Depth chart ===
Pos.	Starting 5	Bench 1	Bench 2
C	Muyang	Balagasay	Bañez
PF	Fajarito	Ambohot	Mandreza
SF	Quinto	Taladua	Agbong
SG	Balanza	Batiller	Galvelo
PG	Calvo	Celis	Yu

== Roster changes ==
The Knights lost its main star Rey Nambatac. Holdovers were Bong Quinto, JP Calvo, Jeo Ambohot, and Jerrick Balanza. Added to the roster were transferees Christian Fajarito, who played for St. Benilde Blazers in 2015 & 2016, big man Larry Muyang from De La Salle University, and former UE Red Warriors duo Edson Batiller and Fran Yu.

== Coaching staff ==
Coach Jeff Napa went on his third year as the head coach of the Knights. He was joined on the sidelines with Leo Pujante, Jay Agleron, Chico Manabat, and Letran Squires head coach RJ Guevarra.

This season also saw the San Miguel Corporation as the primary sponsor of the Letran sports program. Letran officials then appointed San Miguel Corporation sports director and Letran alumnus Alfrancis Chua as Special Assistant to the Rector for Sports Development.

== Injuries ==
- Letran point guard JP Calvo sustained a high ankle sprain on his left foot during the Final Four match against Lyceum Pirates after he accidentally collided with Lyceum center Mike Nzeusseu when the two went for the loose ball.
- In September 2018, Jerrick Balanza was diagnosed with a tumor in his temporal lobe of the brain. Balanza missed the rest of the season.

== NCAA Season 94 games results ==
Elimination games were played in a double round-robin format. All games were aired on ABS-CBN Sports and Action & iWantTFC.

Date	Time	Opponent	Venue	Result	Record
First round of eliminations
Jul 13	4:00 p.m.	Perpetual Altas	Filoil Flying V Centre • San Juan	L 75–78	0–1
Game Highs: Points: Quinto – 15; Rebounds: Fajarito, Quinto – 8; Assists: Quinto – 8
Jul 19	4:00 p.m.	San Sebastian Stags	Filoil Flying V Centre • San Juan	W 83–76	1–1
Game Highs: Points: Quinto – 17; Rebounds: Muyang, Quinto – 8; Assists: Batiller, Quinto – 4
Jul 27	12:00 p.m.	JRU Heavy Bombers	Filoil Flying V Centre • San Juan	W 74–58	2–1
Game Highs: Points: Fajarito, Muyang – 14; Rebounds: Ambohot, Muyang – 9; Assists: Calvo – 6
Aug 2	4:00 p.m.	Benilde Blazers	Letran Gym • Manila	W 64–60	3–1
Game Highs: Points: Quinto – 17; Rebounds: Fajarito – 11; Assists: Balanza – 4
Aug 7	4:00 p.m.	Arellano Chiefs	Filoil Flying V Centre • San Juan	W 88–70	4–1
Game Highs: Points: Muyang – 16; Rebounds: Fajarito – 11; Assists: Calvo – 6
Aug 10	4:00 p.m.	San Beda Red Lions	Filoil Flying V Centre • San Juan	L 76–80^{OT}	4–2
Game Highs: Points: Quinto – 21; Rebounds: Fajarito, Quinto – 11; Assists: Calvo – 6
Aug 17	4:00 p.m.	Lyceum Pirates	Cuneta Astrodome • Pasay City	L 82–87	4–3
Game Highs: Points: Calvo – 18; Rebounds: Fajarito – 12; Assists: Quinto – 9
Aug 21	2:00 p.m.	Mapúa Cardinals	Filoil Flying V Centre • San Juan	W 84–63	5–3
Game Highs: Points: Calvo – 20; Rebounds: Muyang – 14; Assists: Quinto – 11
Aug 26	12:00 p.m.	EAC Generals	Filoil Flying V Centre • San Juan	W 76–56	6–3
Game Highs: Points: Batiller – 17; Rebounds: Quinto – 10; Assists: Quinto – 11
Third place after 1st round (6 wins–3 losses)
Second round of eliminations
Sep 6	4:00 p.m.	Arellano Chiefs	Filoil Flying V Centre • San Juan	W 99–82	7–3
Game Highs: Points: Quinto – 26; Rebounds: Quinto – 8; Assists: Quinto – 12
Sep 11	2:00 p.m.	San Beda Red Lions	Filoil Flying V Centre • San Juan	L 68–74	7–4
Game Highs: Points: Quinto – 19; Rebounds: Fajarito – 11; Assists: Calvo – 7
Sep 21	12:00 p.m.	Mapúa Cardinals	Filoil Flying V Centre • San Juan	W 84–69	8–4
Game Highs: Points: Calvo – 26; Rebounds: Quinto – 14; Assists: Quinto – 11
Sep 25	12:00 p.m.	EAC Generals	Filoil Flying V Centre • San Juan	W 91–82	9–4
Game Highs: Points: Taladua, Galvelo – 15; Rebounds: Muyang – 9; Assists: Fajarito – 9
Sep 28	4:00 p.m.	JRU Heavy Bombers	Filoil Flying V Centre • San Juan	W 89–79	10–4
Game Highs: Points: Galvelo – 16; Rebounds: Muyang – 12; Assists: Quinto – 12
Oct 5	4:00 p.m.	Lyceum Pirates	Filoil Flying V Centre • San Juan	W 80–79	11–4
Game Highs: Points: Muyang – 23; Rebounds: Muyang – 16; Assists: Calvo – 6
Oct 9	12:00 p.m.	San Sebastian Stags	Filoil Flying V Centre • San Juan	W 79–61	12–4
Game Highs: Points: Batiller, Muyang – 15; Rebounds: Muyang – 13; Assists: Calvo – 8
Oct 12	12:00 p.m.	Perpetual Altas	Filoil Flying V Centre • San Juan	W 82–80	13–4
Game Highs: Points: Quinto – 22; Rebounds: Quinto – 9; Assists: Calvo – 7
Oct 23	4:00 p.m.	Benilde Blazers	Filoil Flying V Centre • San Juan	L 81–94	13–5
Game Highs: Points: Quinto – 22; Rebounds: Ambohot, Calvo, Quinto – 7; Assists: Calvo – 7
Third place at 13 wins–5 losses (7 wins–2 losses in the 2nd round)
Final Four (Note: Lyceum held a twice-to-beat advantage over Letran)
Oct 26	1:30 p.m.	Lyceum Pirates	Filoil Flying V Centre • San Juan	L 85–109	0–1 (13–6)
Game Highs: Points: Muyang – 21; Rebounds: Muyang – 12; Assists: Quinto – 7
Lost series in one game

Times listed above are in UTC+08:00

Source: Pong Ducanes, Imperium Technology

== Awards ==
Player	Award
JP Calvo	Player of the Week — July 15–20
Bong Quinto	Player of the Week — August 19–24
Bong Quinto	NCAA Mythical Five member
Jerrick Balanza	Player of the Week — September 2–8
Koy Galvelo	Player of the Week — September 23–29
Larry Muyang	Player of the Week — October 1–6
Larry Muyang	NCAA Rookie of the Year
