= Baldwin Kho =

Filipino visual artist (born 1971)

- Born: Baldwin Chua Kho; January 29, 1971 (age 55); Binondo, Manila, Philippines
- Known for: Visual artist

Baldwin Kho (born January 29, 1971) is a Filipino visual artist and humanitarian. He was the founder of Center for Developmental Arts Manila, Inc.(CDAM), KAPAYAPAAN International Children's Art Festival in 2009, he is the International Humanitarian of Peace awardee of Peace Pals International; Goodwill ambassador of Philippine League Against Epilepsy; founding President of the Epilepsy Awareness and Advocacy, Inc. (Philippines) in 2005 and the director for Bahay Tsinoy, Museum of Chinese in the Philippines.

== Early life and education ==
Kho was born on January 29, 1971, in Binondo, Manila, the eldest among the 4 siblings in the family of Ronnie Ching and Lily Kho. He had his early education at Chiang Kai Shek College, and studied Management Information Technology at AMA Computer College, and he went to study at the College of St. Benilde - De La Salle University taking the course Painting under Prof. Religioso. He is an individual with epilepsy.

== Career ==
In the year 1993, he first organized his first Art and Crafts Workshop in Binondo Chinese Parish. He is also an active supporter of the Autism of the Philippines; he became a youth servant leader at the Binondo Chinese Parish when he was a teenager and remained one for more than a decade after. He is the caretaker of the century-old image of Our Lady of the Most Holy Rosary, a cultural heirloom of the Dominican Order of Preachers and ethnic Chinese – Filipino Catholic community in Binondo.

== Volunteer in action ==
It is not how much we give, it is the message of solidarity that counts – let them know they are not alone.

— Baldwin Kho, a volunteer

Kho is one of the Board of Directors of Kaisa Para sa Kaunlaran, a cause-oriented non-government organization that advocates proactive and sustainable participation of the Tsinoy community in local and national development.
