= Jo Byeong-hyeon =

Jo Byeong-hyeon (Korean: 조병현) is a Korean name consisting of the family name Jo and the given name Byeong-hyeon, and may also refer to:

- Jo Byeong-hyeon (basketball) (born 1932), South Korean basketball player
- Jo Byeong-hyeon (baseball) (born 2002), South Korean baseball player
