= Basketball at the 1956 Summer Olympics =

4th Olympic Basketball Tournament
- Melbourne 1956

Tournament details
- Olympics: 1956 Summer Olympics
- Host nation: Australia
- City: Melbourne
- Duration: November 22 – December 1, 1956

Men's tournament
- Teams: 15
Medals
Gold medalists	United States
Silver medalists	Soviet Union
Bronze medalists	Uruguay

Tournaments
← Helsinki 1952	Rome 1960 →

Basketball at the 1956 Summer Olympics was the fourth appearance of the sport of basketball as an official Olympic medal event. Fifteen nations, an unusually low number for the basketball tournament, competed in the event, with 174 participants. A total number of 56 games of basketball were played.

The teams were divided into four pools, with four teams in three of the pools and only three in the fourth. Every team played against each other team in its pool once. The top two teams from each pool advanced to the quarterfinals, where again they were split into pools of four. Teams again played every other team in their pool, with the top two in each advancing to the semifinal and the bottom two entering a pool for 5th through 8th places. Eliminated teams also played in consolation matches with the same structure as the quarterfinals and finals, but for 9th through 15th places. The games were held at the Royal Exhibition Building.

== Qualified Teams ==
Outright qualifier, World Champion
Outright qualifier, World Runner-up
Outright qualifier, World Bronze medalists
Host nation

Teams Participating by Region
Americas	Europe	Asia	Africa	Oceania
United States	Soviet Union	Philippines	No team participated	Australia
Uruguay	France	Japan	No team participated	—
Brazil	Bulgaria	South Korea	No team participated	—
Chile	—	Singapore	No team participated	—
Canada	—	Republic of China	No team participated	—
—	—	Thailand	No team participated	—

Number of Berths Allocated for the Tournament
Region	Automatic	From the previous World Cup	Berth as Host nation	Total
Europe	3	N/A	N/A	4
Americas	3	2	N/A	4
Asia	5	1	N/A	6
Africa	No team participated			0
Oceania	N/A		1	1
TOTAL	11	3	1	15

== Medalists ==
Gold:	Silver:	Bronze:
United States; Carl Cain; Bill Hougland; K.C. Jones; Bill Russell; James Walsh; William Evans; Burdette Haldorsson; Ronald Tomsic; Dick Boushka; Gilbert Ford; Robert Jeangerard; Charles Darling	Soviet Union; Valdis Muižnieks; Maigonis Valdmanis; Vladimir Torban; Stasys Stonkus; Kazys Petkevičius; Arkadi Bochkarev; Jānis Krūmiņš; Mikhail Semyonov; Algirdas Lauritenas; Yuri Ozerov; Viktor Zubkov; Mikhail Studenetsky	Uruguay; Carlos Blixen; Ramiro Cortés; Héctor Costa; Nelson Chelle; Nelson Demarco; Héctor García Otero; Carlos González; Sergio Matto; Oscar Moglia; Raúl Mera; Ariel Olascoaga; Milton Scaron

== Participating nations ==
For the team rosters see: Basketball at the 1956 Summer Olympics – Men's team rosters.

- Australia (12)
- Brazil (12)
- Bulgaria (11)
- Canada (12)
- Chile (11)
- Republic of China (12)
- France (12)
- Japan (11)
- South Korea (10)
- Philippines (12)
- Singapore (10)
- Soviet Union (12)
- Thailand (9)
- United States (12)
- Uruguay (13)

== Preliminary round ==
=== Group A ===
Pos	Team	Pld	W	L	PF	PA	PD	Pts	Qualification
1	United States	3	3	0	320	122	+198	6	Quarterfinals
2	Philippines	3	2	1	224	237	−13	5	Quarterfinals
3	Japan	3	1	2	171	225	−54	4	9th–15th classification round
4	Thailand	3	0	3	134	265	−131	3	9th–15th classification round

Source: FIBA archive
Rules for classification: 1) points; 2) head-to-head points; 3) head-to-head goal average; 4) head-to-head number of points scored.

23 November
13:30

Philippines	94–55	Thailand
Scoring by half: 34–24, 60–31

Royal Exhibition Building, Melbourne

23 November

United States	98–40	Japan
Scoring by half: 33–20, 65–20

Royal Exhibition Building, Melbourne

24 November

United States	101–29	Thailand
Scoring by half: 54–12, 47–17

Royal Exhibition Building, Melbourne

24 November

Japan	61–77	Philippines
Scoring by half: 29–37, 32–40

Royal Exhibition Building, Melbourne

26 November

Thailand	50–70	Japan
Scoring by half: 20–35, 30–35

Royal Exhibition Building, Melbourne

26 November

United States	121–53	Philippines
Scoring by half: 66–23, 55–30

Royal Exhibition Building, Melbourne

=== Group B ===
Pos	Team	Pld	W	L	PF	PA	PD	Pts	Qualification
1	France	3	3	0	236	183	+53	6	Quarterfinals
2	Soviet Union	3	2	1	255	177	+78	5	Quarterfinals
3	Canada	3	1	2	206	234	−28	4	9th–15th classification round
4	Singapore	3	0	3	154	257	−103	3	9th–15th classification round

Source: FIBA archive
Rules for classification: 1) points; 2) head-to-head points; 3) head-to-head goal average; 4) head-to-head number of points scored.

Soviet Union	97–59	Canada
Scoring by half: 46–20, 51–39

Royal Exhibition Building, Melbourne

Singapore	54–81	France
Scoring by half: 22–44, 32–37

Royal Exhibition Building, Melbourne

Soviet Union	67–76	France
Scoring by half: 18–24, 49–52

Royal Exhibition Building, Melbourne

Canada	85–58	Singapore
Scoring by half: 51–30, 34–28

Royal Exhibition Building, Melbourne

Soviet Union	91–42	Singapore
Scoring by half: 40–21, 51–21

Royal Exhibition Building, Melbourne

France	79–62	Canada
Scoring by half: 43–35, 36–27

Royal Exhibition Building, Melbourne

=== Group C ===
Pos	Team	Pld	W	L	PF	PA	PD	Pts	Qualification
1	Uruguay	3	3	0	238	187	+51	6	Quarterfinals
2	Bulgaria	3	2	1	242	199	+43	5	Quarterfinals
3	Formosa	3	1	2	216	249	−33	4	9th–15th classification round
4	South Korea	3	0	3	194	255	−61	3	9th–15th classification round

Source: FIBA archive
Rules for classification: 1) points; 2) head-to-head points; 3) head-to-head goal average; 4) head-to-head number of points scored.

22 November
20:00

South Korea	76–83	Formosa
Scoring by half: 28–42, 48–41

Royal Exhibition Building, Melbourne

23 November
16:30

Uruguay	70–65	Bulgaria
Scoring by half: 38–35, 32–30

Royal Exhibition Building, Melbourne

24 November
10:30

Uruguay	85–62	Formosa
Scoring by half: 39–36, 46–26

Royal Exhibition Building, Melbourne

24 November
13:30

Bulgaria	89–58	South Korea
Scoring by half: 47–33, 42–25

Royal Exhibition Building, Melbourne

26 November
10:30

Formosa	71–88	Bulgaria
Scoring by half: 35–47, 36–41

Royal Exhibition Building, Melbourne

26 November
16:30

Uruguay	83–60	South Korea
Scoring by half: 35–25, 48–35

Royal Exhibition Building, Melbourne

=== Group D ===
Pos	Team	Pld	W	L	PF	PA	PD	Pts	Qualification
1	Brazil	2	2	0	167	125	+42	4	Quarterfinals
2	Chile	2	1	1	137	134	+3	3	Quarterfinals
3	Australia (H)	2	0	2	122	167	−45	2	9th–15th classification round

Source: FIBA archive
Rules for classification: 1) points; 2) head-to-head points; 3) head-to-head goal average; 4) head-to-head number of points scored.
(H) Hosts

Chile	59–78	Brazil
Scoring by half: 34–39, 25–39

Brazil	89–66	Australia
Scoring by half: 50–35, 39–31

Chile	78–56	Australia
Scoring by half: 37–27, 41–29

== Classification 9–15 ==
=== Group 1 ===
Pos	Team	Pld	W	L	PF	PA	PD	Pts	Qualification
1	Formosa	3	3	0	218	189	+29	6	9th–12th classification playoffs
2	Australia (H)	3	2	1	258	208	+50	5	9th–12th classification playoffs
3	Singapore	3	1	2	200	215	−15	4	13th–15th classification playoffs
4	Thailand	3	0	3	150	214	−64	3	13th–15th classification playoffs

Source: FIBA archive
Rules for classification: 1) points; 2) head-to-head points; 3) head-to-head goal average; 4) head-to-head number of points scored.
(H) Hosts

Singapore	64–67	Formosa
Scoring by half: 23–26, 41–41

Australia	87–48	Thailand
Scoring by half: 48–23, 39–25

Thailand	50–62	Singapore
Scoring by half: 26–29, 24–33

Australia	73–86	Formosa
Scoring by half: 40–39, 33–47

Formosa	65–52	Thailand
Scoring by half: 35–31, 30–21

Australia	98–74	Singapore
Scoring by half: 48–36, 50–38

=== Group 2 ===
Pos	Team	Pld	W	L	PF	PA	PD	Pts	Qualification
1	Canada	2	2	0	147	123	+24	4	9th–12th classification playoffs
2	Japan	2	1	1	143	140	+3	3	9th–12th classification playoffs
3	South Korea	2	0	2	130	157	−27	2	13th–15th classification playoffs

Source: FIBA archive
Rules for classification: 1) points; 2) head-to-head points; 3) head-to-head goal average; 4) head-to-head number of points scored.

South Korea	63–74 (OT)	Canada
Scoring by half: 31–32, 31–30 Overtime: 1–12

Royal Exhibition Building, Melbourne

Japan	83–67	South Korea
Scoring by half: 36–23, 47–44

Royal Exhibition Building, Melbourne

Canada	73–60	Japan
Scoring by half: 40–26, 33–34

Royal Exhibition Building, Melbourne

=== Classification 13–15 ===
Classification Semifinals
1 December
Thailand	47
South Korea	61

13th-place match
1 December
South Korea	79
Singapore	92

- Thailand was named as the final placers of the games because of their loss to the Koreans.

=== Classification 9–12 ===
Classification Semifinals
1 December
Formosa	61
Japan	82
1 December
Australia	38
Canada	83

Ninth-place match
1 December
Japan	60
Canada	75
Eleventh-place match
1 December
Formosa	87
Australia	70

== Quarterfinals ==
=== Group A ===
Pos	Team	Pld	W	L	PF	PA	PD	Pts	Qualification
1	France	3	2	1	195	187	+8	5 (Note: Head-to-head record: France 1–0 Uruguay)	Semifinals
2	Uruguay	3	2	1	221	209	+12	5	Semifinals
3	Chile	3	1	2	221	220	+1	4 (Note: Head-to-head record: Chile 1–0 Philippines)	5th–8th classification playoffs
4	Philippines	3	1	2	204	225	−21	4	5th–8th classification playoffs

Source: FIBA archive
Rules for classification: 1) points; 2) head-to-head points; 3) head-to-head goal average; 4) head-to-head number of points scored.
Notes:

France	71–60	Chile
Scoring by half: 37–23, 34–37

Uruguay	79–70 (OT)	Philippines
Scoring by half: 42–39, 26–29 Overtime: 11–2

Uruguay	80–73	Chile
Scoring by half: 40–25, 40–48

Philippines	65–58 (OT)	France
Scoring by half: 30–26, 25–29 Overtime: 10–3

Chile	88–69	Philippines
Scoring by half: 42–32, 46–37

Uruguay	62–66	France
Scoring by half: 31–38, 31–28

=== Group B ===
Pos	Team	Pld	W	L	PF	PA	PD	Pts	Qualification
1	United States	3	3	0	283	150	+133	6	Semifinals
2	Soviet Union	3	2	1	208	209	−1	5	Semifinals
3	Bulgaria	3	1	2	182	224	−42	4	5th–8th classification playoffs
4	Brazil	3	0	3	192	282	−90	3	5th–8th classification playoffs

Source: FIBA archive
Rules for classification: 1) points; 2) head-to-head points; 3) head-to-head goal average; 4) head-to-head number of points scored.

Bulgaria	44–85	United States
Scoring by half: 19–48, 25–37

Brazil	68–87	Soviet Union
Scoring by half: 28–37, 40–50

Bulgaria	56–66	Soviet Union
Scoring by half: 32–37, 24–29

United States	113–51	Brazil
Scoring by half: 50–22, 63–29

Soviet Union	55–85	United States
Scoring by half: 32–39, 23–46

Bulgaria	82–73	Brazil
Scoring by half: 38–36, 44–37

=== Classification 5–8 ===
Classification Semifinals
Chile	64
Brazil	89
Philippines	70
Bulgaria	80

5th-place game
Brazil	52
Bulgaria	64
7th-place game
Chile	68
Philippines	75

==== Classification Semifinals ====
30 November
15:00

Boxscore

Chile	64–89	Brazil
Scoring by half: 33–55, 31–34
Pts: Ostoic 13		Pts: dos Santos 27

Royal Exhibition Building, Melbourne

30 November
16:30

Boxscore

Philippines	70–80	Bulgaria
Scoring by half: 43–50, 27–30
Pts: Badion 27		Pts: Radev 21

Royal Exhibition Building, Melbourne

==== Seventh-place match ====
1 December

Boxscore

Chile	68–75	Philippines
Scoring by half: 38–33, 30–42

Royal Exhibition Building, Melbourne

==== Fifth-place match ====
1 December

Boxscore

Brazil	52–64	Bulgaria
Scoring by half: 26–27, 26–37

Royal Exhibition Building, Melbourne

== Final round ==
Semi-finals
30 November
(A2) Uruguay	38
(B1) United States	101
30 November
(A1) France	49
(B2) Soviet Union	56

Gold-medal match
1 December
(B1) United States	89
(B2) Soviet Union	55
Bronze-medal match
1 December
(A2) Uruguay	71
(A1) France	62

=== Semifinals ===
30 November
20:00

Boxscore

France	49–56	Soviet Union
Scoring by half: 19–25, 30–31
Pts: Antoine 12		Pts: Krūmiņš 27

Royal Exhibition Building, Melbourne

30 November
21:30

Boxscore

Uruguay	38–101	United States
Scoring by half: 10–51, 28–50
Pts: Mera, Blixen 8 each		Pts: Tomsic 18

Royal Exhibition Building, Melbourne

=== Bronze-medal match ===
1 December
20:00

Boxscore

France	62–71	Uruguay
Scoring by half: 29–37, 32–34
Pts: Monclar 16		Pts: Moglia 25

Royal Exhibition Building, Melbourne

=== Final ===
1 December
21:30

Boxscore

Soviet Union	55–89	United States
Scoring by half: 27–56, 28–33
Pts: Semyonov 15		Pts: Jeangerard 16

Royal Exhibition Building, Melbourne

== Awards ==
1956 Olympic Basketball champions

United States
Fourth title

== Final rankings ==
Pos	Team	Record
1st place, gold medalist(s)	United States	8−0
2nd place, silver medalist(s)	Soviet Union	5−3
3rd place, bronze medalist(s)	Uruguay	6−2
4th	France	5−3
5th	Bulgaria	5−3
6th	Brazil	3−4
7th	Philippines	4−4
8th	Chile	2–5
9th	Canada	5–2
10th	Japan	3–4
11th	Formosa	5−3
12th	Australia	2–5
13th	Singapore	2–5
14th	South Korea	1–6
15th	Thailand	0–7
