= Yi Kuo-juei =

Chinese general (1906–1990)

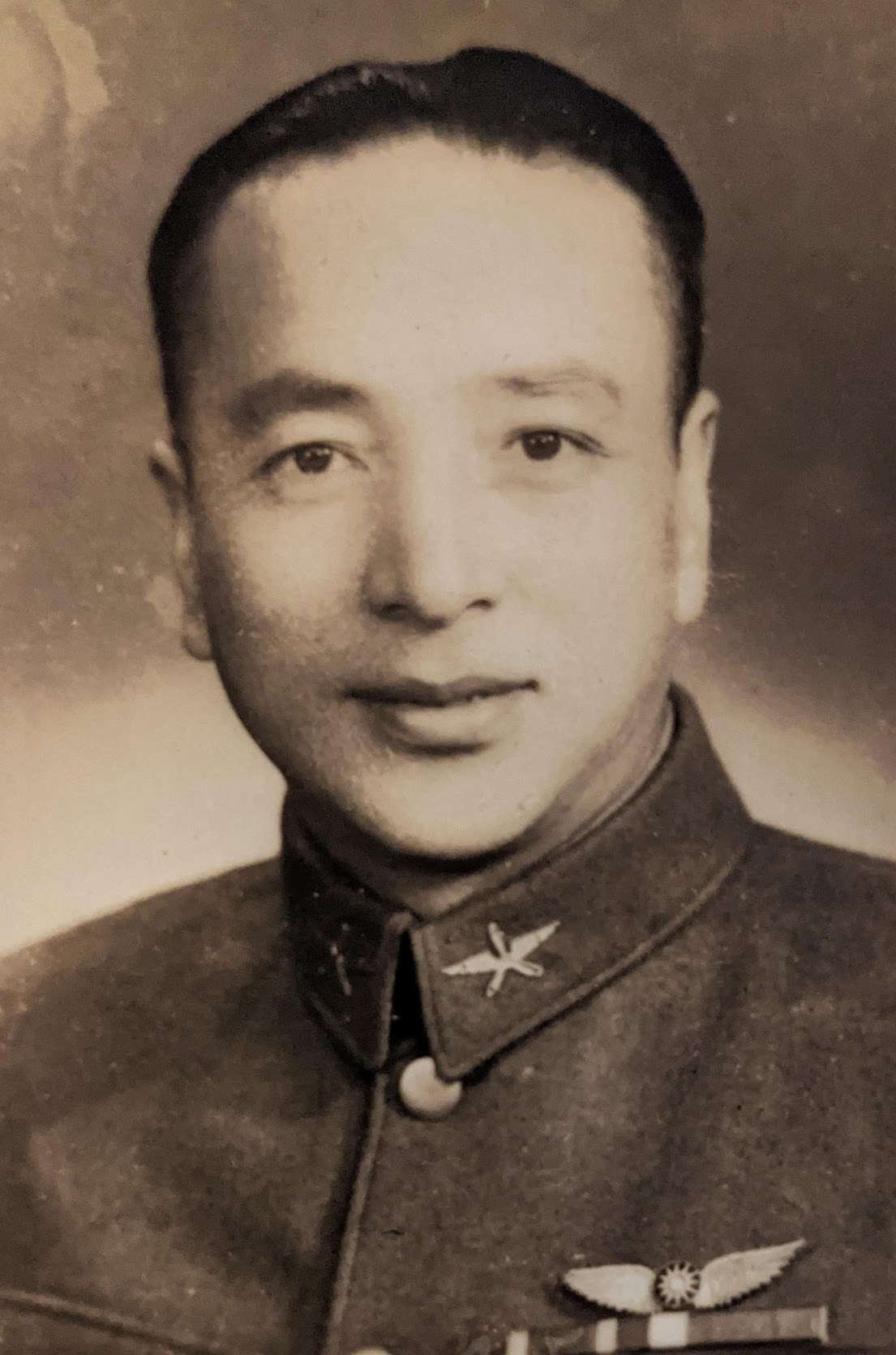
- Yi, c. 1934
- Native name: 易國瑞
- Born: March 7, 1906; Changsha, Hunan, Qing Dynasty
- Died: July 3, 1990 (aged 84) Los Angeles, California
- Allegiance: Republic of China
- Rank: Lieutenant General
- Commands: Republic of China Air Force
- Conflicts: Second Sino-Japanese War; Chinese Civil War
- Awards: Order of Loyalty and Valour; Exemplary Medal of the Spirit of Chu; Good Service Medal; Order of Loyalty and Diligence; 克難英雄

Yi Kuo-juei or Yi Guo-rui; (Chinese: 易國瑞; pinyin: Yì Guóruì; March 7, 1906 – July 3, 1990) was a lieutenant general of the Republic of China Air Force during the Second Sino-Japanese War. He later became the head of athletic operations in Taiwan.

== Biography ==
Born in Changsha, Hunan, he was the sixth son of Yi Man-sheng (Chinese: 易滿生; pinyin: Yì Mǎnshēng) and Hu Jin-rong (Chinese: 胡金容; pinyin: Hú Jīnróng) and he studied at the Whampoa Military Academy's 6th class, where Chiang Kai-shek served as Chief Commandant. He later graduated from Army University 陸軍大學畢業. Lieutenant General of the Republic of China Air Force (ROCAF) 中華民國空軍, he served as the commander of the Air Force, the commander of the Chengdu General Station, the acting commander of the Chengdu Military Region of the Air Force, the deputy commander of the Major General of the First Air Force of the Republic of China Air Force, and the deputy director of the General Political Warfare Bureau of the "Ministry of National Defense".

In the Second Sino-Japanese War where the ROCAF was augmented by a volunteer group of American pilots known as the Flying Tigers, Yi was involved in attacks on Japanese air and ground forces. In 1945, the Japanese surrendered in China's capital, Chongqing 重慶. During the Chinese Civil War, Yi engaged in combat against the People's Liberation Army along the Taiwan Strait, and assisted in the "Great Retreat" of the Kuomintang to Taiwan beginning in 1948. In 1950, he was ordered to hold one of the Republic of China's last remaining airfields in China, Mengzi airport, but it eventually fell to the communists in December. Yi and the #26 battalion led thousands of people through the jungles of Burma and Laos on foot, and received political asylum in Bangkok, Thailand in 1951. Yi was a recipient of the Order of Loyalty and Valour 忠勇勳章, Exemplary Medal of the Spirit of Chu 莒光楷模獎章, Good Service Medal 優績獎章, Order of Loyalty and Diligence 忠勤勳章, and recognized as a national hero 克難英雄 by Chiang Kai-shek (Chinese: 蔣介石; pinyin: Jiǎng Jièshí) for overcoming great difficulties at Mengzi.

Yi was the head of athletic operations in Taiwan which included the Chinese Taipei men's national basketball team, and organized the first Asian Basketball Confederation Championship held in Manila on January 16, 1960. The team required 14 players, but Loo Hor-kuay, Liu Zhong-hong, and Zheng Zheng-nan withdrew due to their academic studies. The Taiwan team finished with a record of 7-2 and placed 2nd overall.

Yi died on July 3, 1990.

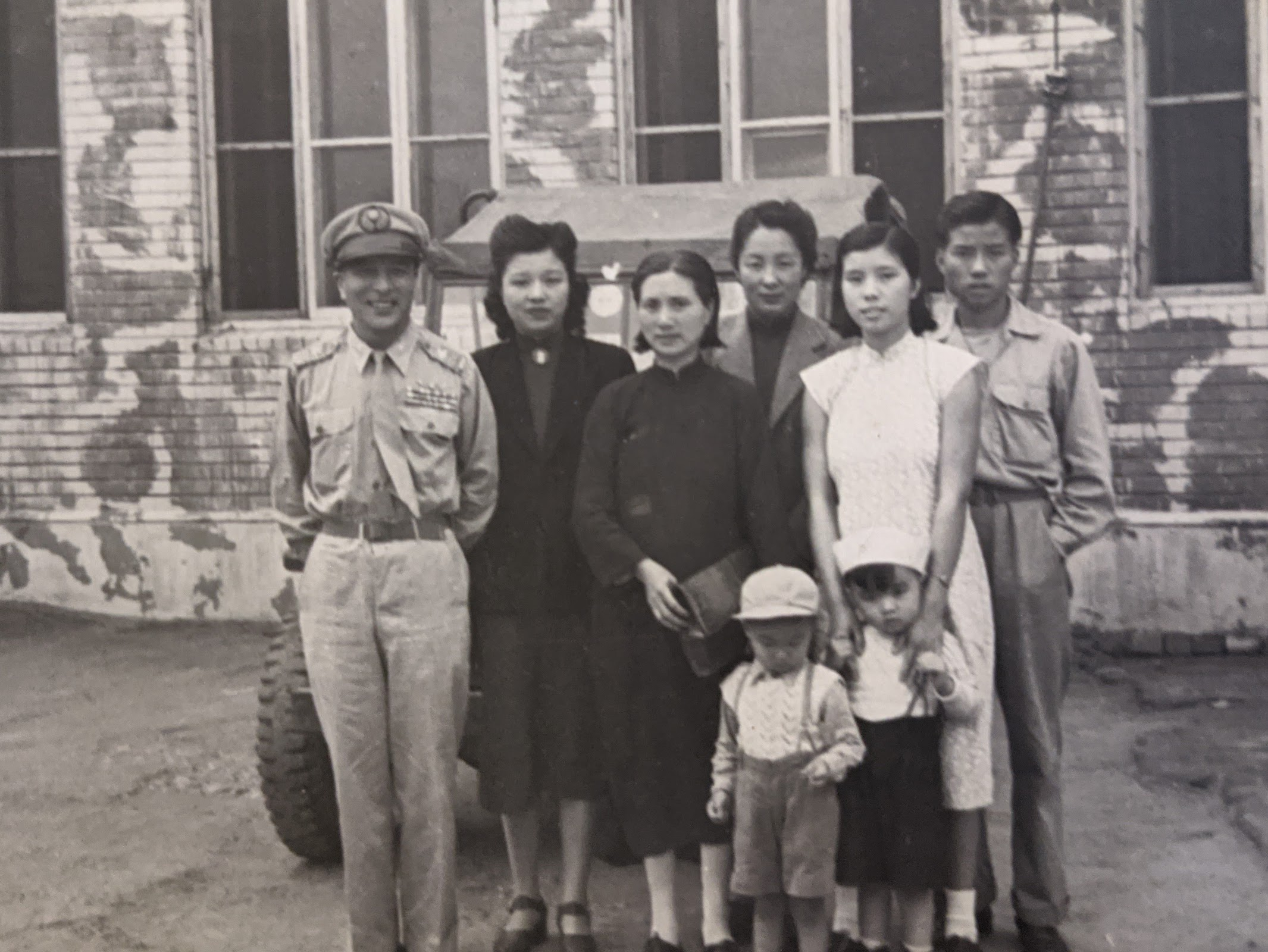
Yi Kuo-juei with family in Shenyang circa 1947

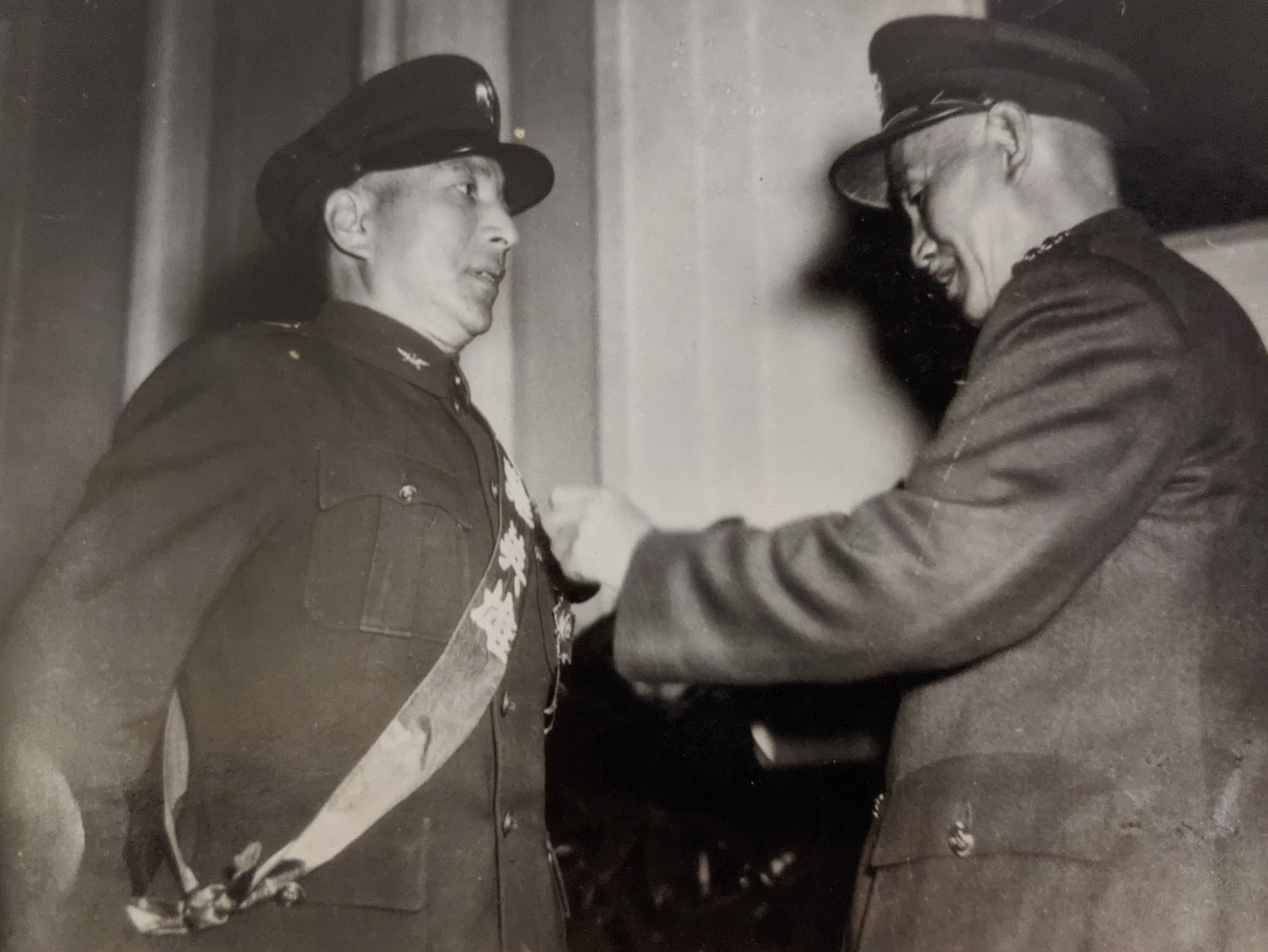
Yi Kuo-juei receiving national hero award 克難英雄 from Chiang Kai-shek
