= Janet Jesudason =

Singaporean sprinter (born 1936)

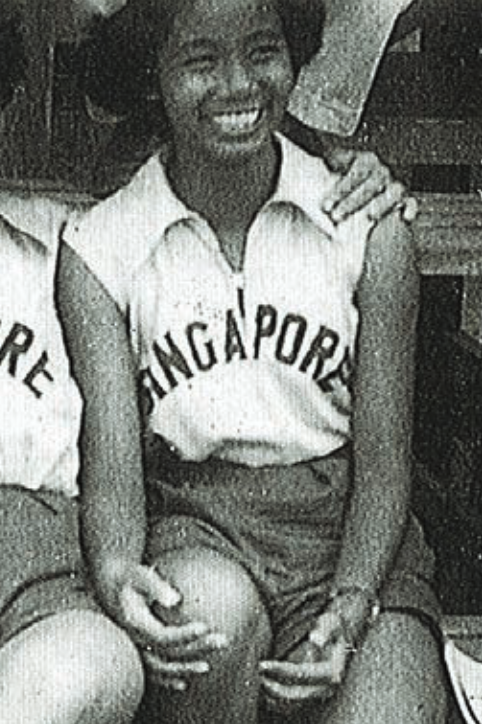
- Jesudason in 1954

Personal information
- Nationality: Singaporean
- Born: 15 December 1936 (age 88) Singapore, Straits Settlements

Sport
- Sport: Sprinting
- Event: 100 metres

Janet Elizabeth Jesudason (born 15 December 1936) is a Singaporean former sprinter. She competed in the women's 100 metres at the 1956 Summer Olympics.

== Early life and education ==
Jesudason was born on 15 December 1936 in Perak, Malaysia to an Indian father and a Chinese mother. She moved to Singapore with her family in 1950 when her father became a teacher at Raffles Institution (RI).

When studying at Katong Convent, Jesudason participated at the secondary schools athletics meet and broke Singapore's Olympic sprinter Tang Pui Wah’s record for the 100-yard race with a time of 12.1 s. Jesudason would also trained with Mary Klass at RI.

== Career ==
In 1956, Jesudason qualified for the 1956 Summer Olympics when she achieved 12.5 s in the 100 m spring during Singapore’s Olympic trials. She would later placed fifth in her heats and failed to qualified for the next round.
