= Baden Powell Cup =

The Baden Powell Cup Tournament is a Filipino-Chinese basketball tournament for scout basketball players, named after the founder of Scouting, Lord Lieutenant General Robert Stephenson Smyth Baden-Powell. The tournament first started in the year 1998, the league stopped for a while and returned in 2005. The first two championships were won by Hope Christian High School. But Chiang Kai Shek College took over and reigned supreme in the tournament since 2006 (currently 7-peat champions).

1st Baden Powell Cup Champion - Hope Christian High School (1998)

2nd Baden Powell Cup Champion - Hope Christian High School (2005)

3rd Baden Powell Cup Champion - Chiang Kai Shek College (2006)

4th Baden Powell Cup Champion - Chiang Kai Shek College (2007)

5th Baden Powell Cup Champion - Chiang Kai Shek College (2008)

6th Baden Powell Cup Champion - Chiang Kai Shek College (2009)

7th Baden Powell Cup Champion - Chiang Kai Shek College (2010)

8th Baden Powell Cup Champion - Chiang Kai Shek College (2011)

9th Baden Powell Cup Champion - Chiang Kai Shek College (2012)

Participating Schools:

- Chiang Kai Shek College
- Philippine Cultural College
- Philippine Academy of Sakya
- Philippine Pasay Chung Hua Academy
- Republic Institute
- Grace Christian College
- Quezon City Christian Academy
- St. Stephen's High School
- Hope Christian High School
- Philadelphia High School
- Philippine Scholastic Academy
- Philippine Tiong Se Academy

Players who made it to the ISAA: Kevin Adriane Go and Reyniel Carlo Choco(Chiang Kai Shek College)

Players who made it to the PBA: *None
