= Mel Brown (basketball) =

Canadian basketball player (1935–2019)

Personal information
- Born: 22 July 1935; Athabasca, Alberta, Canada
- Died: 12 November 2019 (aged 84); North Vancouver, British Columbia, Canada

Sport
- Sport: Basketball

Mel Brown (22 July 1935 – 12 November 2019) was a Canadian basketball player. He competed in the men's tournament at the 1956 Summer Olympics.
