= Loo Hor-kuay =

Taiwanese basketball player

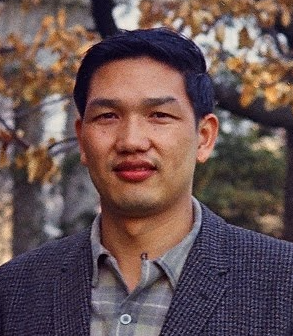
- Loo, c. 1968

Personal information
- Born: 20 August 1934 Dongguan, Guangdong Province
- Died: 10 October 2009 (aged 75) Guangzhou, Guangdong Province
- Listed height: 6 ft 1 in (1.85 m)

Career information
- High school: Pui Ching Middle School (Hong Kong)
- College: National Taiwan University
- Position: Center
- Number: 14

Loo Hor-kuay
- Traditional Chinese: 盧荷渠
- Simplified Chinese: 卢荷渠
Transcriptions
Standard Mandarin
- Hanyu Pinyin: Lú Héqú
Yue: Cantonese
- Jyutping: Lou4 Ho4keoi4

Loo Hor-kuay (Chinese: 盧荷渠; pinyin: Lú Héqú; 20 August 1934 – 10 October 2009), also known as George Hughko Lo, was a basketball player who played as a center.

== Biography ==
Born in Dongguan in central Guangdong province, China, he was the son of a wealthy land owner, Lo Kok Man (盧覺民; Lú Juémín). He attended Pui Ching Middle School (Guangzhou) in 1948 and moved to Hong Kong in 1950 where he went to Pui Ching Middle School (Hong Kong). There he helped reorganize the Iron Spear basketball team (鐵矛籃球隊; Tiě Máo Lánqiú Duì) and began to hone his skills as a basketball player. During the Korean War, the United States Seventh Fleet visited Hong Kong, and the Iron Spears were invited to play in their friendship basketball league. The Iron Spears would eventually take on the name Red and Blue (紅藍隊; Hóng Lán Duì). In 1952, the Red and Blue participated in the Hong Kong Basketball League's Six Finals invitational (六強邀請賽; Liù qiáng yāoqǐngsài) where Loo scored a career-high 46 points in a 92–46 victory against the Shun Lian (順聯隊; Shùn liánduì).

Graduating high school in 1953, he went to play for Hong Kong's Team Self Reliance (自力隊; Zìlì Duì) and gained international recognition with his left hook shot while playing at South China AA Stadium. Two original Iron Spears players were selected for the national team; Loo representing Hong Kong and He Guowei (何國偉; Hé Guówěi) representing mainland China. Due to the political situation at the time, the National Olympic Committee selected Taiwan to represent China, and as a result, only Loo was selected to compete as part of the Republic of China's squad at the 1956 Summer Olympics. Coached by Bud Schaeffer, they finished with a record of 5-3 and placed 11th overall in basketball at the 1956 Summer Olympics. He continued his studies at National Taiwan University as an overseas Chinese student (僑生; qiáoshēng). Loo turned down Yi Kuo-juei's (易國瑞; Yì Guóruì) offer to play at the 1960 ABC Championship to focus on his academics, and graduated in 1961 from the National Taiwan University's Department of Mechanical Engineering. At the 1962 Asian Games he represented Hong Kong.

Loo died on 10 October 2009. On 4 December 2009, during the 120th anniversary of the Pui Ching Middle School (Guangzhou), the Red and Blue played on their home basketball court in the Loo Hor-Kuay Memorial Cup in his honor.

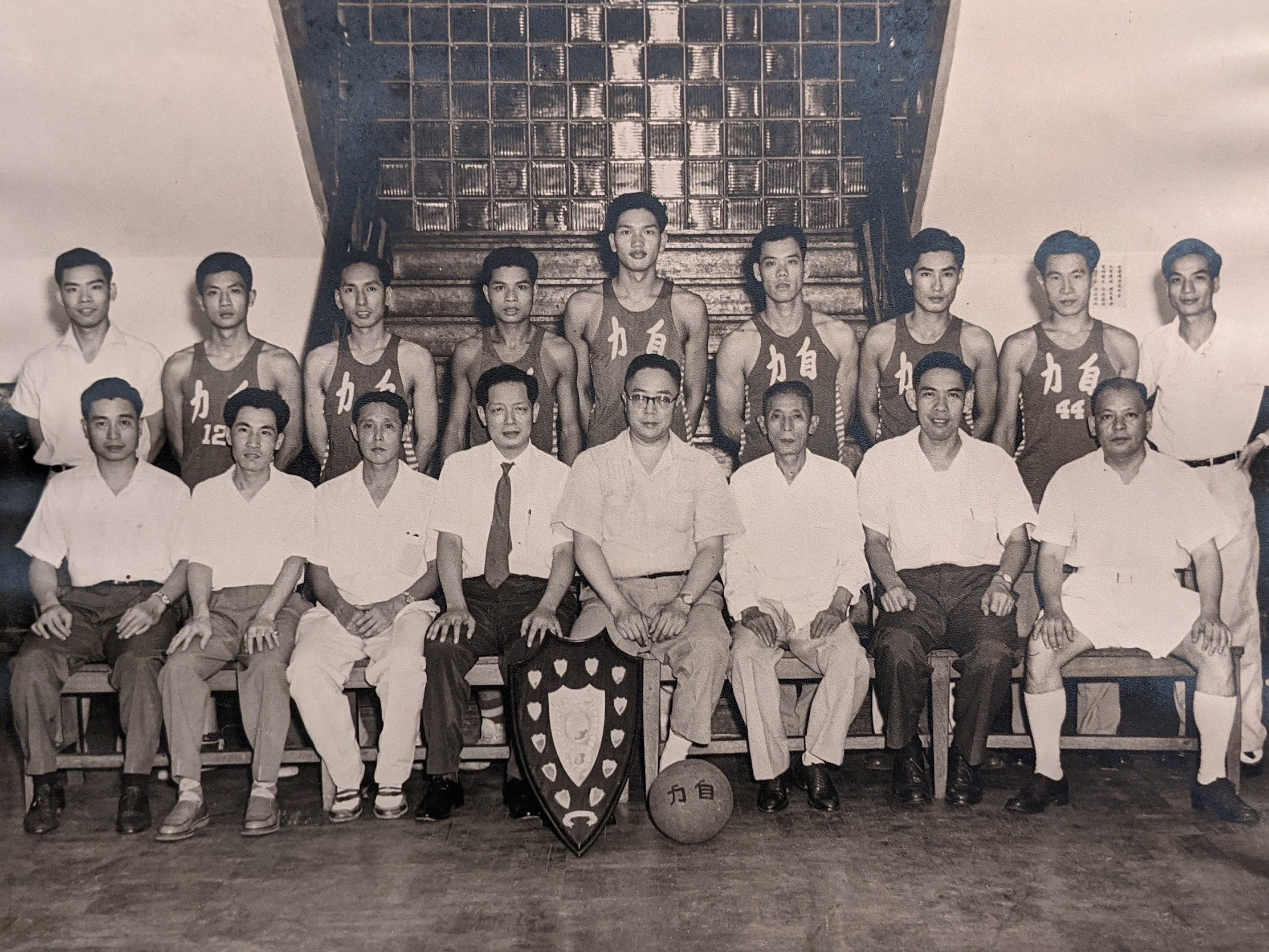
Loo Hor-Kuay featured in team photo with Hong Kong's Self Reliance circa 1956

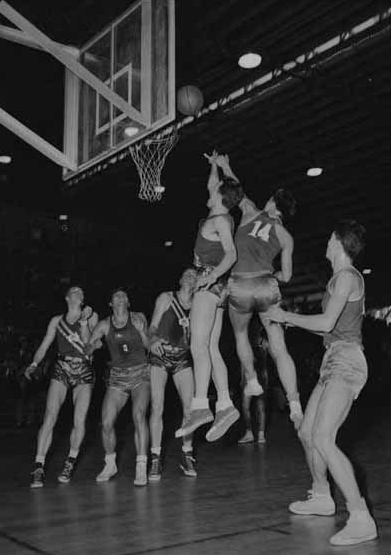
Loo Hor-kuay (#14) beats flying interception by Inge Friedenfelds (AUS.) at the 1956 Summer Olympics
