= Manun Bumroongpruck =

Thai sprinter (1936–2015)

Personal information
- Native name: มนัญ บำรุงพฤกษ์
- Nationality: Thai
- Born: 5 April 1936
- Died: July 2015 (aged 79)

Sport
- Sport: Sprinting

Manun Bumroongpruck (Note: alternatively Manut Bumrungphuk) (Thai: มนัญ บำรุงพฤกษ์; 5 April 1936 – July 2015) was a Thai sprinter and army officer. He competed in the men's 200 metres, 400 metres, and 4 × 400 metres relay events at the 1956, 1960 and 1964 Summer Olympics, respectively. He afterwards became an athletics coach for the Thailand National Team and secretary of the Athletics Association of Thailand. He served as an officer in the Royal Thai Army, reaching the rank of colonel. He received the Hall of Fame award for his lifetime achievements at the 5th Siam Keela Awards in 2011.
