= Eduardo Puertollano =

Uruguayan cyclist (born 1934)

Personal information
- Born: 25 February 1939 (age 87) Montevideo, Uruguay

Cycling career
- Sport: Cycling

Eduardo Puertollano González (born 25 February 1939) is a Uruguayan former cyclist. He competed in three events at the 1956 Summer Olympics.
