= Ron Stuart =

Canadian basketball player

Personal information
- Born: 23 April 1929 Edmonton, Alberta, Canada
- Died: 9 September 1983 (aged 54) Vancouver, British Columbia, Canada

Sport
- Sport: Basketball

Ronald Alexander Stuart (23 April 1929 – 9 September 1983) was a Canadian basketball player. He competed in the men's tournament at the 1956 Summer Olympics in Australia.

== Personal life ==
His birth year has also been published as 1928.

Stuart killed himself in 1983.
