= Bahay Tsinoy =

Museum in Manila, Philippines

Kaisa Heritage Center
- 華裔文化傳統中心
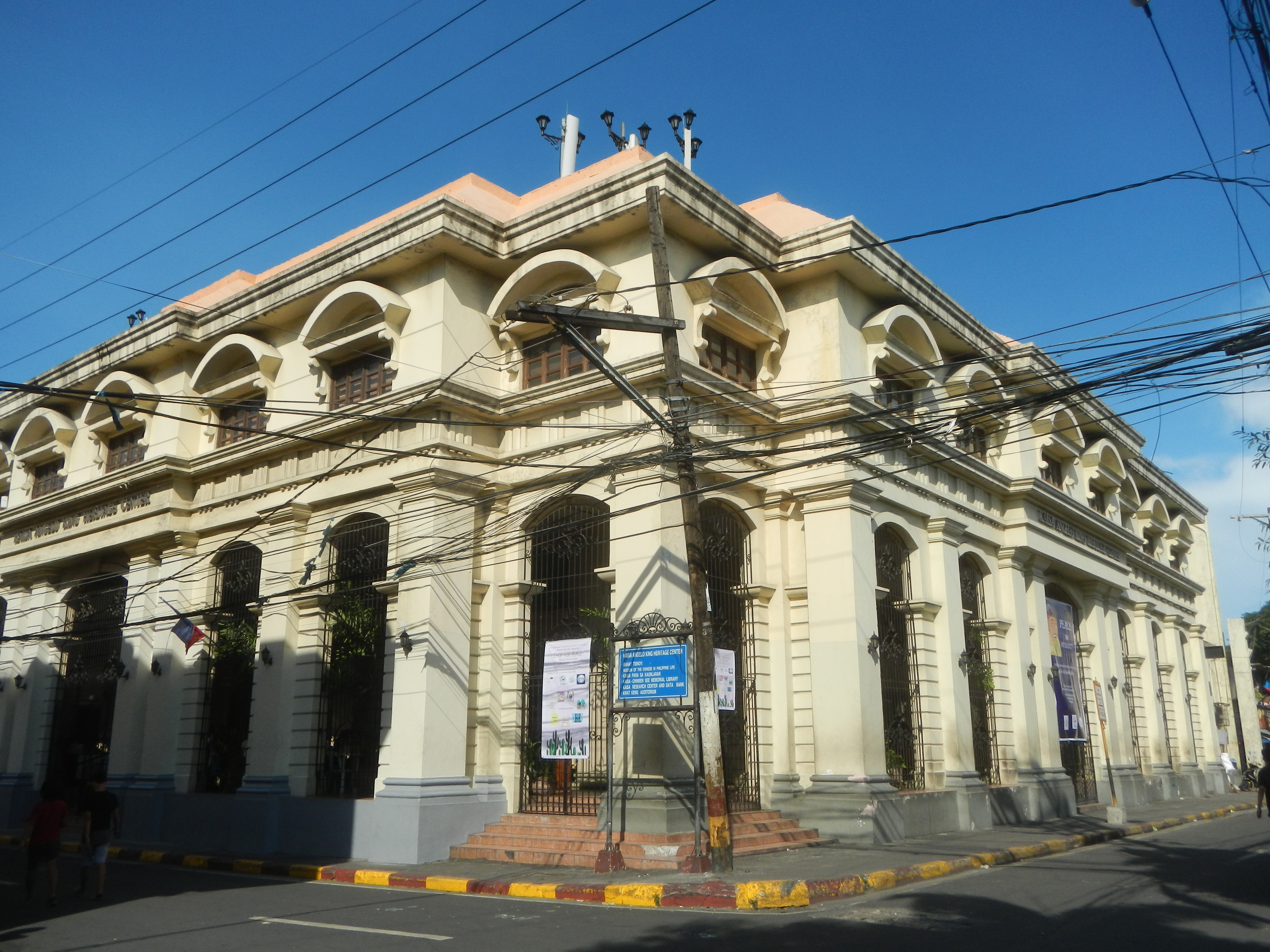
- Coordinates: 14°35′27″N 120°58′30″E
- Building details
- Location in Manila Location in Metro Manila Location in Luzon Location in the Philippines
- Alternative names: Bahay Tsinoy; Kaisa Heritage Center Building

General information
- Status: Completed
- Type: Mansion
- Architectural style: American Colonial
- Location: Intramuros, 32 Anda Cor. Cabido Sts., Manila, Philippines
- Current tenants: Kaisa Heritage Center
- Completed: 1999
- Owner: Kaisa Para sa Kaunlaran, Inc.

Technical details
- Floor count: 3

Design and construction
- Architects: Eva Penamora; Honrado Fernandez

Website
- www.bahaytsinoy.org

The Bahay Tsinoy (lit. 'Chinese-Filipino House') is a building in Intramuros, Manila, Philippines which houses the Kaisa-Angelo King Heritage Center, a museum documents the history, lives and contributions of the ethnic Chinese in the Philippine life and history.

== Overview ==
The museum was designed by Eva Penamora in collaboration with the late architect Honrado Fernandez in 1996, and completed and inaugurated in 1999. Kaisa Para sa Kaunlaran, Inc., a non-profit organization co-founded by Teresita Ang-See, envisioned the project to provide another venue for advocating patriotism to the Philippines and promoting cultural identity and understanding between the local Chinese and Filipino communities, after the acclaimed bi-lingual children's educational television program Pinpin in the early 1990s.

Funding for the land and building structure was advanced by Angelo King Foundation and eventually raised through generous contributions from different levels of Filipino-Chinese community, from tai-pans to average wage-earners.

The museum is divided into the following sections:

- Early contacts
- The Parian
- Colonial culture
- Emergence of the Chinese community
- In defense of freedom
- Life in the 1800s
- National leaders of Chinese descent
- Gallery of rare prints and photographs
- Martyr's hall
- Ceramics collection
- Rare Philippine shell collection
- Tsinoys in nation-building (inaugurated in 2004)

The museum is fully air-conditioned and housed within the Kaisa-Angelo King Heritage Center building, which also houses the office of Kaisa Para sa Kaunlaran, Inc., Chinbin See Memorial Library, the Await Keng Theater Auditorium, the Benito Cu Uy Gam Hall, and the Pao Shi Tien and Madame Limpe seminar rooms, which all constitute the Kaisa Heritage Center.

== See also ==
- Chinese Filipino
- Sangley
- List of museums in the Philippines
