= Don Macintosh =

Canadian basketball player

Personal information
- Nationality: Canadian
- Born: 6 November 1931 Vancouver, British Columbia, Canada
- Died: 20 June 1994 (aged 62) Kingston, Ontario, Canada

Sport
- Sport: Basketball

Don Macintosh (6 November 1931 – 20 June 1994) was a Canadian basketball player. He competed in the men's tournament at the 1956 Summer Olympics.
