= Reizo Ohira =

Japanese basketball player (born 1935)

Personal information
- Nationality: Japanese
- Born: 7 March 1935 (age 90)

Sport
- Sport: Basketball

Reizo Ohira (born 7 March 1935) is a Japanese basketball player. He competed in the men's tournament at the 1956 Summer Olympics.
