= Tan Ser Cher =

Singaporean weightlifter

Tan Ser Cher is a weightlifter from Singapore who began full-time training in the sport when he was 16, and was crowned the "Champion of Champions" in the local weightlifting competition in 1954 at the age of 21. He represented Singapore in the 1956 Summer Olympics in Melbourne, Australia in his first international competition, and came in at 7th position.

In 1955, Tan won his first international title at a triangle meet (Singapore, Malaysia and Indonesia) in Singapore with a weight of 655 lbs. In 1956, he won silver medal at a 4 nation-meet (Singapore, Malaysia, Indonesia and China) with a weight of 655.5 lbs.

In 1958, Tan reached the 4th position at the 3rd Asian Games held in Tokyo, Japan. Two months later, he achieved the gold medal at the 1958 British Empire and Commonwealth Games in the featherweight category after hoisting 685 lbs. Tan then retire from weightlifting due to an injury to his back.

However, in 1959, he was asked to represent Singapore in the 1st SEAP Games in Bangkok, Thailand. He won a bronze medal in the featherweight division and retired permanently from weightlifting.
