= Political Warfare Bureau =

Political control office of the Taiwanese army

- 政治作戰局; Zhèngzhì Zuòzhàn Jú

Agency overview
- Formed: 1 March 2002
- Jurisdiction: Republic of China
- Headquarters: Zhongshan, Taipei; 25.0799°N 121.5427°E
- Parent agency: Ministry of National Defense
- Website: gpwd.mnd.gov.tw

The Political Warfare Bureau (GPWB; traditional Chinese: 國防部政治作戰局; simplified Chinese: 国防部政治作战局; pinyin: Guófángbù Zhèngzhì Zuòzhànjú) is the affiliated authority of the Ministry of National Defense (MND) of the Republic of China (Taiwan) that is responsible for all the political warfare affairs of the Republic of China Armed Forces.

== History ==
Since its establishment in 1924, the Whampoa Military Academy has run a set political work system. In April 1950, the academy reformed the political work system by changing the Political Staff Bureau to Political Department. In May 1951, it was renamed General Political Department and in August 1963 as General Political Warfare Department with some modifications to its structural agencies. The department was led by deputy director Yi Kuo-juei. On 1 March 2002, the Organizational Ordinance of the General Political Warfare Bureau was put into performance.

In response to increasing Chinese Communist Party (CCP) political warfare campaigns on social media in the late 2010s the Political Warfare Bureau set up a team dedicated to the expeditious handling of false information. The Bureau uses big data system analysis in its efforts to understand and counter CCP disinformation campaigns in real time.

== Organizational structure ==
- General Administration Division (主計室)
- Office of Military Spokesperson (軍事新聞處)
- Military Dependents Service Division (軍眷服務處)
- Military Discipline & Ethics Division (政戰綜合處)
- Counter Intelligence & Security Division (保防安全處)
- Cultural & Political Division (文宣心戰處)

== See also ==
- Political Work Department of the Central Military Commission
- Military Intelligence Bureau
