= Ron Bissett =

Canadian basketball player

Personal information
- Nationality: Canadian
- Born: 8 November 1931 Vancouver, British Columbia, Canada
- Died: 18 July 2015 (aged 83) Kirkland, Washington, United States

Sport
- Sport: Basketball

Ron Bissett (8 November 1931 – 18 July 2015) was a Canadian basketball player. He competed in the men's tournament at the 1956 Summer Olympics.
