= Chiang Kai-shek College =

Private Chinese college in Manila, Philippines

Chiang Kai Shek College
- Kolehiyo ng Chiang Kai Shek (Filipino); Chinese: 菲律濱中正學院
- Seal
- Former name: Chiang Kai-shek High School (1939–1965)
- Type: Private Non-stock Non-profit Non-sectarian Coeducational Basic and Higher education institution
- Established: 1939
- Founders: Wong Chun Seng; Yu Khe Thai
- Academic affiliations: Association of Chinese-Filipino Schools in the Philippines
- President: Judelio Yap
- Vice-president: Rolance Chua
- Students: 70,000+
- Location: 1274 Padre Algue St., Tondo, Manila, Metro Manila, Philippines; 14°36′27.39″N 120°58′36.01″E
- Campus: Urban Main campus: Padre Algue Campus
- Alma Mater song: The Chiang Kai Shek College School Hymn
- Colors: Blue and White
- Sporting affiliations: Metro Manila Tiong Lian Basketball Association, Women's National Collegiate Athletic Association, Filipino Chinese Amateur Athletic Federation Meet, Baden Powell Cup Basketball Tournament
- Website: cksc.edu.ph
- Location in Manila Location in Metro Manila Location in Luzon Location in the Philippines

Chiang Kai-shek College

Chinese name
- Traditional Chinese: 菲律濱中正學院
- Simplified Chinese: 菲律滨中正学院
- Literal meaning: Philippines Chung-cheng [Name of Chiang Kai-shek] School
Transcriptions
Standard Mandarin
- Hanyu Pinyin: Fēilùbīn Zhōngzhèng Xuéyuàn
- Wade–Giles: Fei1-lu4-pin1 Chung1-cheng4 Hsüeh2-yüan4
Southern Min
- Hokkien POJ: Hui-li̍p-pin Tiong-chèng Ha̍k-īⁿ

Filipino name
- Tagalog: Kolehiyo ng Chiang Kai Shek

Chiang Kai-shek College (Filipino: Kolehiyo ng Chiang Kai Shek; Chinese: 菲律濱中正學院) is a Chinese Filipino institution of higher learning founded by Chinese Filipinos, recognized by the government of the Republic of the Philippines and the Republic of China (Taiwan). The school (学校) offers programs in the Preschool (幼稚園), Grade School (小學), Junior High School (初中), Senior High School (高中), and College (大學). It is the largest Chinese Filipino school in population in the Philippines. The school is located at 1274 Padre Algue St. Tondo, Manila, Philippines. The school is named after Chiang Kai-shek, the second president of the Republic of China during the Kuomintang regime.

== History ==
In 2007, Joan Sy-Cotio, after serving for many years, retired as the college president. Dr. Bee Ching Ong Kian Koc succeeded her and finished her term in 2013. Dr. Dory Poa, an alumna of CKSC who finished her doctorate degree at Stanford University, became the college president from 2013 to 2020. After her retirement, Atty. Danny Chan became College President for two years. Dr. Judelio Yap succeeded Atty. Chan in 2022, after serving the school for the last 32 years.

== Campuses ==
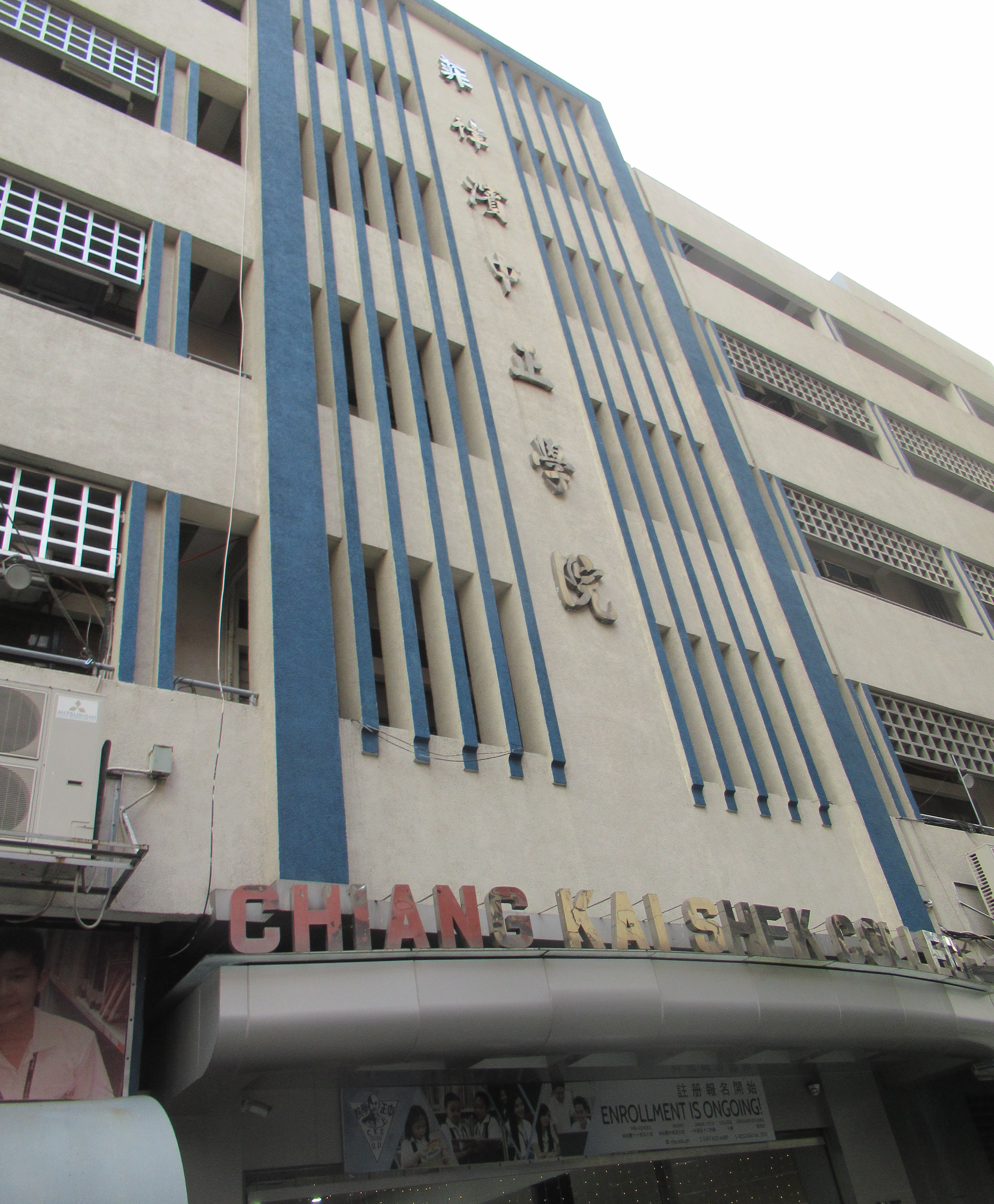
Padre Algue Main Campus

=== Main Campus ===
Two four-story and five five-story concrete buildings comprise the Padre Algue Campus (Main Campus). Its notable facilities include Chiang Kai-shek Memorial Hall (a multipurpose auditorium), a Little Theatre, a conference room for the Chiang Kai-shek College Alumni Association, libraries, two gyms, Speech Learning Center, a Music room, a Math Lab, a guidance office, a dance studio, a computer (Mac) lab, Visual Arts Studios (IB), and the Home Economics Room.

The Chiang Kai-shek Memorial Hall is a fully air-conditioned multipurpose auditorium. The auditorium is a popular venue for conventions, seminars, regional and national competitions and social gatherings of alumni. Found at the center of the main campus, the open court quadrangle can accommodate 3,000. It is where the high school and elementary students hold their flag ceremony. The main campus’ gymnasium has a seating capacity of 2,500. This basketball court has been a favorite site for Metro Manila Filipino-Chinese basketball games and College Women's Basketball Tournament. The gymnasium may also be used for playing volleyball, badminton and table tennis. The Wong Chun Seng Memorial Pre-School Buildings maintain facilities for music, arts, sciences, languages, and library activities as well as a playground.

=== Narra Campus ===
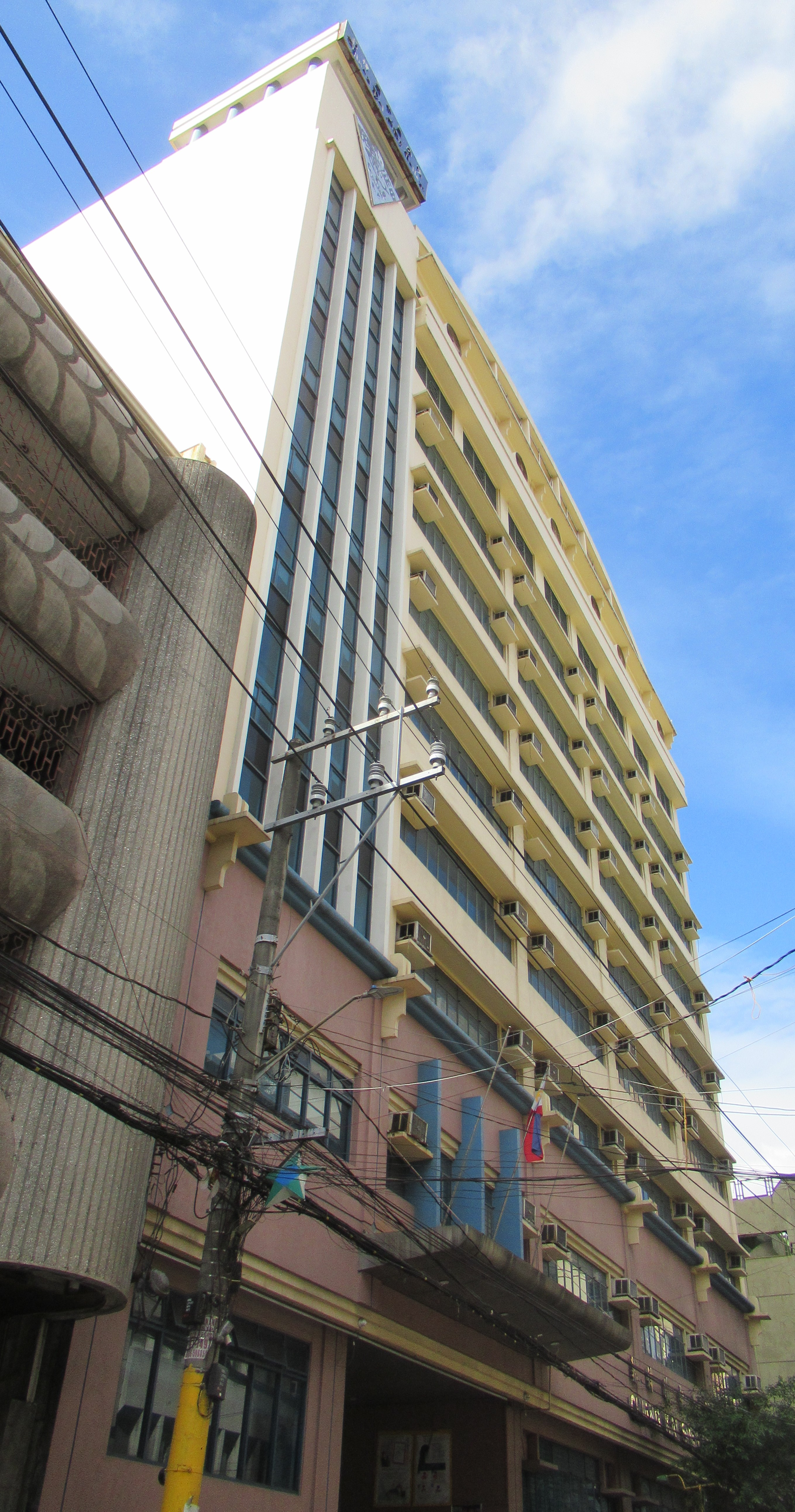
Narra Campus

The college and graduate school are now located at the nine-story Narra Building. Its facilities include chemistry laboratory and gyms. A gymnasium in Narra Campus is named after Chinese-Filipino community leader Benjamin Chua Jr.

The Narra Campus now houses the Senior High School as well. In pursuance of the K-12 curriculum, the school implemented a Bridging Program in 2015 to shorten the transition to the K-12 by temporarily implementing a trimestral school year. With the Grade 10 (formerly Fourth Year graduating students) successfully promoted to Grade 11, the Senior High School classes were transferred to the Narra Campus in 2016 under the headship of Dr. Raymond Datuon. Under the K-12, the Narra Campus offers the three major tracks (ABM, STEM and HUMSS) as well as the core and specialized courses. In 2017, with Dr. Datuon moving to another school, the headship was assigned to Mr. Fidel Savares.

=== New Campus ===
The new campus will be built on a 10-hectare lot in South Forbes Golf City Silang, Cavite. The lot was donated by Ambassador K. C Ng, an alumnus of the school.

== Athletics ==
CKSC teams, known as the Blue Dragons, compete in several major leagues, including the Women's National Collegiate Athletic Association (WNCAA) and the Metro Manila Tiong Lian Basketball Association.

== Notable alumni ==
- Lucio Tan (陳永栽) - A prominent Chinese-Filipino business magnate
- Henry Sy Sr. (施至成) - Retail King of the Philippines, founder of SM Investments Corporation
- Tony Tan-Caktiong (陳覺中) - Founder of Philippine fastfood chain Jollibee
- Carlos Chan (施恭旗) - Founder of Liwayway Group of Companies Oishi
- George Ty (鄭少堅) - Founder and former Chairman of Metrobank Group of Companies
- Stephen S.F. Chen (陳錫蕃) - National Policy Advisor to the President of the Republic of China
- Lim Eng Beng (林嬰鳴) – PBA player
- Justin Chua – PBA player
- JC Tiuseco – actor
- Baldwin Kho – Filipino-Chinese visual artist and Humanitarian
- EJ Obiena (蔡華強) – Pole Vaulter
- James Yap (葉克強) - Filipino-Chinese basketball player
