= Ong Kiat Guan =

Singaporean basketball player

Personal information
- Nationality: Singaporean
- Born: c. 1930
- Died: 4 December 1983 (aged 53)

Sport
- Sport: Basketball

Ong Kiat Guan (c. 1930 – 4 December 1983) was a Singaporean basketball player. He competed in the men's tournament at the 1956 Summer Olympics.
