= Mary Klass =

Singaporean sprinter (born 1935)

Personal information
- Full name: Mary Beatrice Klass
- Nationality: Singaporean
- Born: 16 May 1935 (age 91)

Sport
- Sport: Sprinting
- Event: 100 metres
Medal record
Women's athletics
Representing Singapore
Asian Games
Silver medal – second place	1954 Manila	100 m

Mary Beatrice Klass (born 16 May 1935) is a Singaporean former sprinter. She competed in the women's 100 metres at the 1956 Summer Olympics. Klass won a silver medal in the 100 metres at the 1954 Asian Games. She is a Eurasian of Dutch and Portuguese descent. In 2016, Klass was inducted to the Singapore Women's Hall of Fame.

== Career ==
Klass was born as the 5th child in a 7 child household. Her parents expected her to be treated as a "house girl". She attended Saint Anthony's Convent School. Klass started running aged 19 as a way to get away from household chores. She trained herself to run without a coach at the Raffles Institution at 5:30am and 5:30pm. Her parents were not supportive and she had to self-fund her way to tournaments. In 1954, she won a silver medal in the 100-metres at the Asian Games in the Philippines. In 1955, she broke the 100 yard record at the Malayan Championships. For the 1956 Summer Olympics held in Melbourne, Australia, Klass was the only Singaporean track athlete to meet the Singapore Amateur Athletic Association qualifying time. In doing so, became one of the first women to represent Singapore at the Olympics. Three other track athletes would join her despite not making the qualifying time. Klass and the others trained on a cinder track at Farrer Park prior to leaving for the Olympics.

At the Olympics, Klass ran in the 100 metre and 200 metre events. In the 100 metres, she finished last in her heat. In the 200 metres, she finished second last in her heat. Klass was the last female Singaporean sprinter to qualify for the 200 metres at the Olympics until Shanti Pereira qualified for the event in the 2020 Summer Olympics. She retired from athletics in 1957.
