= Héctor Costa =

Uruguayan basketball player (1929–2010)

Personal information
- Born: 30 July 1929 Montevideo, Uruguay
- Died: 23 May 2010 (aged 80)
Medal record
Men's basketball
Representing Uruguay
Olympic Games
Bronze medal – third place	1952 Helsinki	Team Competition
Bronze medal – third place	1956 Melbourne	Team Competition

Héctor José "Guanaco" Costa Massironi (30 July 1929 – 23 May 2010) was a Uruguayian basketball player.

He won twice the bronze medal with the men's national team at the Summer Olympics: in 1952 and 1956. He competed in three consecutive Olympics for his native country, starting in 1952 (Helsinki, Finland).

He died in 2010, aged 80. His remains are buried at Cementerio del Buceo, Montevideo.
