= Kim Yeong-su =

South Korean basketball player

Personal information
- Nationality: South Korean

Sport
- Sport: Basketball

Kim Yeong-su is a South Korean basketball player. He competed in the men's tournament at the 1956 Summer Olympics.
