= Kim Hyeong-il =

South Korean basketball player

Personal information
- Nationality: South Korean

Sport
- Sport: Basketball

Kim Hyeong-il is a South Korean basketball player, who competed in the men's tournament at the 1956 Summer Olympics.
