= Visit Chaicharoen =

Thai basketball player

Personal information
- Nationality: Thai

Sport
- Sport: Basketball

Visit Chaicharoen is a Thai basketball player. He competed in the men's tournament at the 1956 Summer Olympics.
