= Jerome Henderson (Singaporean basketball player) =

Singaporean basketball player

Personal information
- Born: 1936 (age 89–90) Singapore
- Listed height: 6 ft 3 in (1.91 m)

Jerome C. Henderson (born 1936), also known as Wang Dexun, is a Singaporean former basketball player. He competed in the men's tournament at the 1956 Summer Olympics.

Henderson was born to a German father and Chinese mother. He stood at 6 feet 3 inches (1.91 m) and was the "far and away" tallest player on the Singapore national team.

Henderson was also a state-level high jumper and hurdler. His Olympics profile states that he supposedly emigrated to the United Kingdom.
