= Wong Kim Poh =

Singaporean basketball player

Personal information
- Nationality: Singaporean
- Born: 12 February 1934; Kluang, Malaysia
- Died: 29 October 2013 (aged 79); Simei, Singapore

Sport
- Sport: Basketball

Wong Kim Poh (12 February 1934 – 29 October 2013) was a Singaporean basketball player. He competed in the men's tournament at the 1956 Summer Olympics.
