= Yeo Gek Huat =

Singaporean basketball player (born 1931)

Personal information
- Nationality: Singaporean
- Born: 1931

Sport
- Sport: Basketball

Yeo Gek Huat (born 1931) is a Singaporean basketball player. He competed in the men's tournament at the 1956 Summer Olympics. Yeo was listed on a list of former Olympians which were uncontactable as of 2011.
