= Ariel Olascoaga =

Uruguayan basketball player

Olympic medal record

Men's basketball

Representing Uruguay
Bronze medal – third place	1956 Melbourne	Team competition

Ariel Olascoaga Gutiérrez (26 August 1929 – 22 August 2010) was a Uruguayan basketball player who competed in the 1956 Summer Olympics.
