= Ramiro Cortés (basketball) =

Uruguayan basketball player (1931–1977)

Olympic medal record

Men's basketball

Representing Uruguay
Bronze medal – third place	1956 Melbourne	Team competition

Ramiro Prudencio Cortés Molteni (1931 – 23 April 1977) was a Uruguayan basketball player who competed in the 1956 Summer Olympics. He was born in Salto in 1931 and died there in 1977.
