= Carlos González (basketball) =

Uruguayan basketball player (1930–2018)

Olympic medal record

Men's basketball

Representing Uruguay
Bronze medal – third place	1956 Melbourne	Team competition

Carlos Eduardo González Gallo (2 May 1930 – 18 July 2018) was a Uruguayan basketball player who competed in the 1956 Summer Olympics.
