= Jorge Olivieri =

Brazilian basketball player (1931–1966)

Personal information
- Nationality: Brazilian
- Born: 9 August 1931
- Died: 8 September 1966 (aged 35)

Sport
- Sport: Basketball

Jorge Carlos Dortas Olivieri, also commonly known simply as Jorge Olivieri (9 August 1931 – 8 September 1966) was a Brazilian basketball player. He competed in the men's tournament at the 1956 Summer Olympics.
