= Milton Scaron =

Uruguayan basketball player (1936–2026)

Olympic medal record

Men's basketball

Representing Uruguay
Bronze medal – third place	1956 Melbourne	Team competition

Milton Antonio Scaron Falero (25 August 1936 – 21 July 2026) was a Uruguayan basketball player who competed in the 1956 Summer Olympics and in the 1960 Summer Olympics. He was born in Montevideo on 25 August 1936.

Scaron died in Montevideo on 21 July 2026, at the age of 89.
