= Go Se-tae =

South Korean basketball player (1925–1986)

- Born: 1925
- Died: 22 April 1986 (aged 60–61); Hyochang-dong, Yongsan District, Seoul

Korean name
- Hangul: 고세태
- Hanja: 高世泰
- RR: Go Setae
- MR: Ko Set'ae

Go Se-tae (Note: Spelled Ko Se Te in contemporary sources. See e.g. Doyle, Edward A., ed. (1958). The Official Report of the Organizing Committee for the Games of the XVI Olympiad, Melbourne, 1956. Organizing Committee of the XVI Olympiad. p. 741. OCLC 224257408.) (Korean: 고세태; 1925 – 22 April 1986) was a South Korean basketball player who competed in the 1956 Summer Olympics. He graduated from Kaesong Songdo Middle School, (Note: 송도중학교; 松都中學校; Songdo Junghakkyo. Kaesong was captured by North Korea during the Korean War, and the school moved to Incheon.) and went on to attend Korea University. In 1952 he was in military service and played for the Military Manpower Administration basketball team. He later played for the Korea Development Bank team. After his appearance at the Olympics, he became a director of the Korea Basketball Association, and was one of the few directors who did not join the mass resignation after the South Korean team's poor performance at the 1964 Summer Olympics. He died at his home in Hyochang-dong, Yongsan District, Seoul on the morning of 22 April 1986.
