= Wee Tian Siak =

Chinese-Singaporean basketball player

Personal information
- Nationality: Singaporean
- Born: 26 April 1921
- Died: 29 July 2004 (aged 83)

Sport
- Sport: Basketball

Wee Tian Siak (Chinese: 黃天錫; pinyin: Huáng Tiānxī; 26 April 1921 – 29 July 2004) was a Chinese born Singaporean basketball player. He competed in the men's tournament at the 1948 Summer Olympics, representing China, and at the 1956 Summer Olympics, representing Singapore. He was the flag bearer for the Republic of China at the opening ceremony of 1948 Summer Olympics.

Wee studied in Ai Tong Primary and Chung Cheng High.

In 1952, Wee was selected by Taiwan for the 1952 Summer Olympics. Due to the Cross-Strait relations between Taiwan and China, Taiwan did not compete in the end and hence, Wee did not participate.
