= An Yeong-sik =

South Korean basketball player

Personal information
- Nationality: South Korean
- Born: 1928
- Died: 22 January 1991 (aged 62–63)

Sport
- Sport: Basketball

An Yeong-sik (1928 – 22 January 1991) was a South Korean basketball player. He competed in the men's tournament at the 1956 Summer Olympics.
