= James Yap (basketball, born 1933) =

Chinese Filipino basketball player (1933–2003)

James Yap (葉克強)
Personal information
- Born: 26 September 1933 Xiamen, China
- Died: 2003 (aged 69–70)

James Yap (Chinese: 葉克強; (26 September 1933 – 2003) was a Chinese Filipino basketball player who competed as part of the Republic of China's squad at the 1956 Summer Olympics. He graduated from Chiang Kai-shek College. He was born in 1933 on Gulangyu Island, Xiamen, China and moved to the Philippines at the age of 5.

James Yap
- Traditional Chinese: 葉克強
- Simplified Chinese: 叶克强
Transcriptions
Standard Mandarin
- Hanyu Pinyin: Ye Keqiang
- Wade–Giles: Yeh Ko-chiang

In 1954, he attended the FIBA World Basketball Championship in Rio de Janeiro and the Asian Games in Manila as a member of the Republic of China team. In 1956, he was a member of the ROC team to the Olympics in Melbourne and once again in Rome in 1960. He died in 2003.
