= Raúl Mera =

Uruguayan basketball player

Personal information
- Born: June 14, 1936 (age 90) Montevideo, Uruguay
Medal record
Men's basketball
Representing Uruguay
Olympic Games
Bronze medal – third place	1956 Melbourne	Team Competition

Raúl Ebers Mera Pozzi (born 14 June 1936) is a Uruguayan basketball player who won the bronze medal with the men's national team at the 1956 Summer Olympics in Melbourne, Australia. Four years later he once again competed in the Olympics for his native country.
