= Chien Kok-ching =

Taiwanese basketball player

Chien Kok-ching (錢 國楨)
Personal information
- Born: 1933 (age 92–93)

Chien Kok-ching (Chinese: 錢國楨; pinyin: Qián Guózhēn; born c. 1934) is a Taiwanese former basketball player. He competed as part of the Republic of China's squad at the 1956 Summer Olympics.
