= Ko Tai Chuen =

Singaporean basketball player

Personal information
- Nationality: Singaporean
- Born: 1925; China
- Died: 30 July 1999 (aged 73–74)

Sport
- Sport: Basketball

Ko Tai Chuen (1925 – 30 July 1999) was a Singaporean basketball player. He competed in the men's tournament at the 1956 Summer Olympics.
