= Chen Sho Fa =

Singaporean basketball player

Personal information
- Nationality: Singaporean
- Born: 1928
- Died: 5 September 2015 (aged 86–87)

Sport
- Sport: Basketball

Chen Sho Fa (1928 – 5 September 2015) was a Singaporean basketball player. He competed in the men's tournament at the 1956 Summer Olympics.
