= An Byeong-seok =

South Korean basketball player

Personal information
- Nationality: South Korean
- Born: 4 March 1923
- Died: 1984 (aged 60–61)

Sport
- Sport: Basketball

An Byeong-seok (4 March 1923 – 1984) was a South Korean basketball player. He competed in the men's tournament at the 1948 Summer Olympics and the 1956 Summer Olympics.
