= Kirin Chavanwong =

Thai basketball player (born 1931)

Personal information
- Nationality: Thai
- Born: 1931

Sport
- Sport: Basketball

Kirin Chavanwong (born 1931) is a Thai basketball player. He competed in the men's tournament at the 1956 Summer Olympics.
