= Dorta Jagić =

Croatian poet and writer (born 1974)

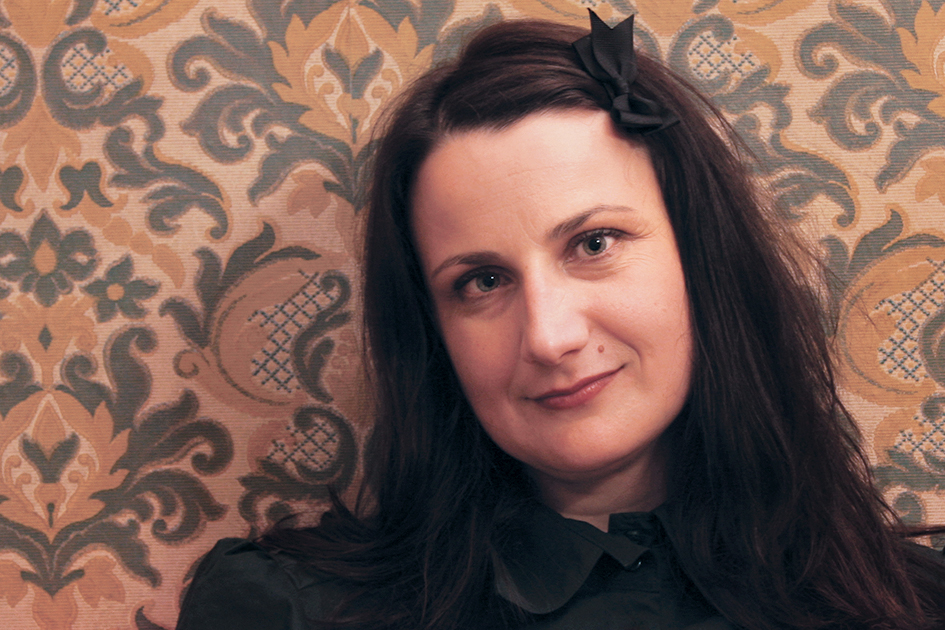
Jagić in 2009

Dorta Jagić (born 6 November 1974) is a Croatian poet and writer. She was born in Sinj, Croatia. She graduated from the Jesuit Faculty of Philosophy in Zagreb (philosophy and religious culture). She writes poetry, short prose pieces, drama, travelogues and theatre reviews, and translates from English and German. Her poems and short stories have been translated into many languages (German, English, Polish, Romanian, Italian, Slovak, Bulgarian, Greek, Spanish, French, Turkish, etc.) Her work is featured in various Croatian and foreign anthologies and magazines (Manuskripte, Trafika Europe, Poiesis, Arquitrave, Poemari etc.) and she was a guest at many poetry festivals all over the world. Since 1999 she has been involved with various amateur theatre groups as a director and educator. She is also for years a teacher of creative writing. She lives in Zagreb as freelance artist.

== Publications ==
=== Poetry ===
- Plahta preko glave (1999)
- Thamagochi mi je umro na rukama (2001)
- Đavo i usidjelica (2006)
- Kvadratura duge (2007)
- Kauč na trgu (2011)
- Kafkin nož (2015)

=== Prose ===
- Kičma (2009)
- S tetovažom nisi sam (2010)
- Mali rječnik biblijskih žena (2013)
- Prolazi i pukotine (2015)
- Veće od kuće (2018)

=== Translations ===
- Kanapa na rynku, Poland (2014)
- Vysoké cé, Slovakia (2015)
- Poèmes, France (2017)
- Portret Ciała, Poland (2018)

== Awards ==
- Goran Award for young poets, Croatia, 1999
- Balkan Grand Prize for Poetry, Romania, 2007
- The European Poet of Freedom Award, Poland, 2014
- Gorans Wreath, Croatia, 2017
