= Carlos Blixen =

Uruguayan basketball player (1936–2022)

Personal information
- Full name: Carlos Samuel Blixen Abella
- Born: 27 December 1936 Montevideo, Uruguay
- Died: 1 August 2022 (aged 85)
Medal record
Men's basketball
Representing Uruguay
Olympic Games
| Bronze medal – third place | 1956 Melbourne | Team competition |

Carlos Samuel Blixen Abella (27 December 1936 – 1 August 2022) was a Uruguayan basketball player, who won the bronze medal with the men's national team at the 1956 Summer Olympics in Melbourne, Australia. Four years later he once again competed in the Olympics.

His nickname was "El Ingles" ("The Englishman")
