= Chan Sae-Lim =

Thai basketball player

Personal information
- Nationality: Thai
- Born: 1933 (age 91–92)

Sport
- Sport: Basketball

Chan Sae-Lim (born 1933) is a Thai basketball player. He competed in the men's tournament at the 1956 Summer Olympics.
