= Lee Chak Men =

Singaporean basketball player (born 1922)

Personal information
- Nationality: Singaporean
- Born: 1922

Sport
- Sport: Basketball

Lee Chak Men (born 1922) was a Singaporean basketball player. He competed in the men's tournament at the 1956 Summer Olympics.
