= Ho Lien Siew =

Singaporean basketball player (1932–2021)

Personal information
- Nationality: Singaporean
- Born: 5 September 1932 Singapore, British Malaya
- Died: 3 April 2021 (aged 88) Singapore

Sport
- Sport: Basketball
Medal record
Southeast Asian Games
Bronze medal – third place	Rangoon 1961	Men's Basketball

Ho Lien Siew (5 September 1932 – 3 April 2021) was a Singaporean basketball player. He competed in the men's tournament at the 1956 Summer Olympics.

Ho represented Singapore in the national basketball team at the 1956 Summer Olympics at Melbourne, Australia, the 1959, 1961, 1965 Southeast Asian Peninsular Games and the 1962 Asian Games.

He won the Men's Basketball bronze medal at the 1961 Southeast Asian Peninsular Games Ho continued to play competitively until he was 50. He became a basketball coach until 82.
