= Ta Sriratana =

Thai basketball player

Personal information
- Nationality: Thai
- Born: 1939 (age 85–86)

Sport
- Sport: Basketball

Ta Sriratana (born 1939) is a Thai basketball player. He competed in the men's tournament at the 1956 Summer Olympics.
