= Chalaw Sonthong =

Thai basketball player

Personal information
- Nationality: Thai
- Born: 1932 (age 92–93)

Sport
- Sport: Basketball

Chalaw Sonthong (born 1933) is a Thai basketball player. He competed in the men's tournament at the 1956 Summer Olympics.
