= Surakit Rukpanich =

Thai basketball player (born 1932)

Personal information
- Nationality: Thai
- Born: 1932 (age 92–93)

Sport
- Sport: Basketball

Surakit Rukpanich (born 1932) is a Thai basketball player. He competed in the men's tournament at the 1956 Summer Olympics.
