= Nelson Chelle =

Uruguayan basketball player (1931–2001)

Personal information
- Born: May 18, 1931 Paysandú, Uruguay
- Died: December 17, 2001 (aged 70)
Medal record
Men's basketball
Representing Uruguay
Olympic Games
Bronze medal – third place	1956 Melbourne	Team Competition

Nelson Rubens Chelle Naddeo (May 18, 1931 – December 17, 2001) was a basketball player from Uruguay, who won the bronze medal with the men's national team at the 1956 Summer Olympics in Melbourne, Australia. Four years later he once again competed in the Olympics for his native country.
