= Kim Young-ki =

South Korean basketball player

Personal information
- Nationality: South Korean
- Born: 7 January 1936 (age 89)

Korean name
- Hangul: 김영기
- Hanja: 金永基
- RR: Gim Yeonggi
- MR: Kim Yŏnggi

Sport
- Sport: Basketball

Kim Young-ki (born 7 January 1936) is a South Korean basketball player. He competed in the men's tournament at the 1956 Summer Olympics and the 1964 Summer Olympics.

In 1958 he was in mandatory military service and played for the Republic of Korea Air Force team in domestic competition. He also represented South Korea internationally at the Asian Games that year in Tokyo. His son Kim Sang-sik made his professional basketball debut in 1991. In 1993 he was named a vice-president of the Korea Basketball Association. In 2006 he was promoted from vice-president to president of the Korean Basketball League. He received the 14th Sogang Athletics Grand Award in 2022.
