= Tetsuro Noborisaka =

Japanese basketball player (1934–1978)

Personal information
- Nationality: Japanese
- Born: 12 February 1934
- Died: 30 August 1978 (aged 44)

Sport
- Sport: Basketball

Tetsuro Noborisaka (登坂 哲朗, Noborisaka Tetsurō, 12 February 1934 – 30 August 1978) was a Japanese basketball player. He competed in the men's tournament at the 1956 Summer Olympics.
