= Mongkol Aimmanolrom =

Thai basketball player (born 1934)

Personal information
- Nationality: Thai
- Born: 1934 (age 90–91)

Sport
- Sport: Basketball

Mongkol Aimmanolrom (born 1934) is a Thai basketball player. He competed in the men's tournament at the 1956 Summer Olympics.
