= Yee Tit Kwan =

Singaporean basketball player

Personal information
- Nationality: Singaporean
- Born: 7 January 1927; Guangzhou, China
- Died: 14 January 2017 (aged 90); Monterey Park, California, U.S.

Sport
- Sport: Basketball

Yee Tit Kwan (7 January 1927 – 14 January 2017) is a Singaporean basketball player. He competed in the men's tournament at the 1956 Summer Olympics.
