= Baek Jeong-nam =

South Korean basketball player

Personal information
- Nationality: South Korean
- Born: 1936
- Died: 2005 (aged 68–69)

Sport
- Sport: Basketball

Baek Jeong-nam (1936 – 2005) was a South Korean basketball player. He competed in the men's tournament at the 1956 Summer Olympics.
