= Willie Chu =

Taiwanese basketball player

Willie Chu (朱聲漪)
Personal information
- Born: 26 August 1927
- Died: 28 September 2020 (aged 93)

Willie Chu (Chinese: 朱聲漪; 26 August 1927 – 28 September 2020) was a Taiwanese basketball player. He competed as part of the Republic of China's squad at the 1956 Summer Olympics. After his playing career ended, Chu became a coach. He died on 28 September 2020, and was posthumously inducted to the Taiwan Basketball Hall of Fame in 2023, a member of the second overall class.
