= Choi Tae-gon =

South Korean basketball player

Personal information
- Nationality: South Korean

Sport
- Sport: Basketball

Choi Tae-gon (1926/1927 – 23 January 2018) was a South Korean basketball player. He competed in the men's tournament at the 1956 Summer Olympics.
