= Jo Byeong-hyeon (basketball) =

South Korean basketball player

Personal information
- Nationality: South Korean
- Born: 1932 (age 93–94) Seoul, Korea

Sport
- Sport: Basketball

Jo Byeong-hyeon (born 1932) is a South Korean basketball player. He competed in the men's tournament at the 1956 Summer Olympics.
