= Switzerland men's national basketball team =

Men's national basketball team representing Switzerland

Switzerland
- FIBA ranking: 63 ▼2 (1 September 2026)
- Joined FIBA: 1932 (co-founders)
- FIBA zone: FIBA Europe
- National federation: Swiss Basketball
- Coach: Thibaut Petit
- Nickname(s): Nati (National Team); Rossocrociati (Red Crosses)

Olympic Games
- Appearances: 3
- Medals: None

FIBA World Cup
- Appearances: None

EuroBasket
- Appearances: 5
- Medals: None
Home	Away

First international
- Switzerland 19–39 France (Geneva, Switzerland; 5 March 1932)

Biggest win
- Switzerland 68–19 Scotland (Paris, France; 11 May 1951)

Biggest defeat
- Switzerland 53–130 Spain (Geneva, Switzerland; 24 November 1988)

The Switzerland men's national basketball team (French: Équipe de Suisse de basketball, German: Schweizer Basketballnationalmannschaft, Italian: Nazionale di pallacanestro della Svizzera, Romansh: Squadra naziunala da ballape da la Svizra) represents Switzerland in international basketball. The managing body for the national team is Swiss Basketball.

Switzerland has competed at five EuroBasket tournaments (1935, 1946, 1951, 1953, 1955) in their history. The national team has also made three appearances at the Olympic Games (1936, 1948, 1952). However, Switzerland has struggled over the past decades to once again qualify to international competitions. They also continue their pursuit to clinch their debut trip to the FIBA World Cup.

== History ==
=== EuroBasket 1935 ===
Switzerland hosted the first European Basketball Championship in Geneva at EuroBasket 1935. The national team finished fourth in the ten team tournament, defeating Romania and Italy in the preliminary round to advance to the semifinals. There they lost to Latvia, resulting in a playoff for third place against Czechoslovakia which the Swiss lost 25–23.

=== EuroBasket 1946 ===
Switzerland did not play in the European championship again until the post-war, at EuroBasket 1946, which they hosted. There, they placed second in their three-team preliminary group after losing to the eventual champions Czechoslovakia 20–17, but defeating Belgium 38–33. That preliminary round finish put the Swiss into a 5th/6th place playoff against the Netherlands, which Switzerland won 36–25.

=== EuroBasket 1951 ===
The next Swiss entry into the European Basketball Championship was at the EuroBasket 1951 tournament in Paris. Switzerland finished the preliminary round with a 1–3 record, 4th in their group. They fared little better in the first classification, taking 3rd in the group with a 1–2 record. In the second classification round, the Swiss won the classification 13-16 and 13/14 games to finish in 13th place of 18 teams, with a 4–5 record.

=== EuroBasket 1953 ===
EuroBasket 1953 in Moscow was the fourth appearance of the Swiss. The tournament began poorly for the team, as they finished last in their preliminary pool at 0–3. It got somewhat better for them after that, as they took second in their first classification pool with 2 wins and a loss. They dropped their 9-12 semifinal to Belgium, but defeated Finland in the 11/12 final to take 11th of 17 overall.

=== EuroBasket 1955 ===
Switzerland competed next at the EuroBasket 1955 tournament in Budapest. Their 2–2 record in preliminary round put them in 3rd of the five-team group and relegated them to the classification rounds. They had similar results there, again taking a 2–2 record and 3rd of 5 teams. They won their classification 13-16 semifinal, but lost to Austria in the 13/14 game to finish 14th of 18 teams.

=== Later years ===
The 1952 Summer Olympics and the 1955 EuroBasket are the last major international basketball tournaments that the country qualified for. Since then, it lost its international significance despite occasional strong showings at qualification games. E.g. Switzerland surprisingly beat former European Champion Russia at the qualification for the 2015 EuroBasket.

== Competitive record ==
=== FIBA World Cup ===
World Cup					Qualification		
Year	Position	Pld	W	L	Pld	W	L
(Argentina) 1950	Did not qualify				5	3	2
(Brazil) 1954	Did not qualify				Did not qualify		
(Chile) 1959	Did not enter				Did not enter		
(Brazil) 1963	Did not enter				Did not enter		
(Uruguay) 1967	Did not qualify				EuroBasket served as qualifiers		
(Socialist Federal Republic of Yugoslavia) 1970	Did not qualify				EuroBasket served as qualifiers		
(Puerto Rico) 1974	Did not qualify				EuroBasket served as qualifiers		
(Philippines) 1978	Did not qualify				EuroBasket served as qualifiers		
(Colombia) 1982	Did not qualify				EuroBasket served as qualifiers		
(Spain) 1986	Did not qualify				6	1	5
(Argentina) 1990	Did not qualify				EuroBasket served as qualifiers		
(Canada) 1994	Did not qualify				EuroBasket served as qualifiers		
(Greece) 1998	Did not qualify				EuroBasket served as qualifiers		
(United States) 2002	Did not qualify				EuroBasket served as qualifiers		
(Japan) 2006	Did not qualify				EuroBasket served as qualifiers		
(Turkey) 2010	Did not qualify				EuroBasket served as qualifiers		
(Spain) 2014	Did not qualify				EuroBasket served as qualifiers		
(China) 2019	Did not enter				Did not enter		
(Philippines) (Japan) (Indonesia) 2023	Did not qualify				4	2	2
(Qatar) 2027	Did not qualify				16	8	8
(France) 2031	To be determined				To be determined		
Total	0/20				31	14	17

=== Olympic Games ===
Olympic Games					Qualifying		
Year	Position	Pld	W	L	Pld	W	L
(Nazi Germany) 1936	9th	3	2	1			
(United Kingdom) 1948	21st	8	2	6			
(Finland) 1952	20th	2	0	2			
(Australia) 1956	Did not qualify						
(Italy) 1960	Did not qualify				6	2	4
(Japan) 1964	Did not qualify				7	1	6
(Mexico) 1968	Did not enter				Did not enter		
(West Germany) 1972	Did not qualify				7	0	7
(Canada) 1976	Did not enter				Did not enter		
(Soviet Union) 1980	Did not qualify				4	1	3
(United States) 1984	Did not qualify				3	0	3
(South Korea) 1988	Did not qualify				3	0	3
(Spain) 1992	Did not qualify				6	0	6
(United States) 1996	Did not qualify				Did not qualify		
(Australia) 2000	Did not qualify				Did not qualify		
(Greece) 2004	Did not qualify				Did not qualify		
(China) 2008	Did not qualify				Did not qualify		
(United Kingdom) 2012	Did not qualify				Did not qualify		
(Brazil) 2016	Did not qualify				Did not qualify		
(Japan) 2020	Did not enter				Did not enter		
(France) 2024	Did not qualify				Did not qualify		
(United States) 2028	To be determined				To be determined		
Total	3/21	13	4	9	36	4	32

=== EuroBasket ===
EuroBasket					Qualification		
Year	Position	Pld	W	L	Pld	W	L
(Switzerland) 1935	4th	4	2	2			
(Latvia) 1937	Did not enter						
(Lithuania) 1939	Did not enter						
(Switzerland) 1946	5th	3	2	1			
(Czechoslovakia) 1947	Did not enter						
(Egypt) 1949	Did not enter						
(France) 1951	13th	9	4	5			
(Soviet Union) 1953	11th	8	3	5			
(Hungary) 1955	14th	10	5	5			
(Bulgaria) 1957	Did not enter						
(Turkey) 1959	Did not enter						
(Socialist Federal Republic of Yugoslavia) 1961	Did not enter						
(Poland) 1963	Declined participation				2	2	0
(Soviet Union) 1965	Did not qualify				3	0	3
(Finland) 1967	Did not qualify				2	0	2
(Italy) 1969	Did not qualify				4	0	4
(West Germany) 1971	Did not qualify				4	1	3
(Spain) 1973	Did not enter				Did not enter		
(Socialist Federal Republic of Yugoslavia) 1975	Did not qualify				5	2	3
(Belgium) 1977	Did not enter				Did not enter		
(Italy) 1979	Did not qualify				3	2	1
(Czechoslovakia) 1981	Did not qualify				4	2	2
(France) 1983	Did not qualify				4	3	1
(West Germany) 1985	Did not enter				Did not enter		
(Greece) 1987	Did not enter				Did not enter		
(Socialist Federal Republic of Yugoslavia) 1989	Did not qualify				9	3	6
(Italy) 1991	Did not qualify				4	1	3
(Germany) 1993	Did not qualify				6	4	2
(Greece) 1995	Did not qualify				5	1	4
(Spain) 1997	Did not qualify				16	6	10
(France) 1999	Did not qualify				3	1	2
(Turkey) 2001	Did not qualify				24	11	13
(Sweden) 2003	Did not qualify				16	6	10
(Serbia and Montenegro) 2005	Division B				6	4	2
(Spain) 2007	Division B				8	5	3
(Poland) 2009	Division B				8	5	3
(Lithuania) 2011	Division B				6	4	2
(Slovenia) 2013	Did not qualify				8	3	5
(France) (Croatia) (Germany) (Latvia) 2015	Did not qualify				12	6	6
(Finland) (Israel) (Romania) (Turkey) 2017	Did not qualify				6	1	5
(Czech Republic) (Georgia (country)) (Italy) (Germany) 2022	Did not qualify				14	5	9
(Cyprus) (Finland) (Poland) (Latvia) 2025	Did not qualify				16	6	10
(Estonia) (Greece) (Slovenia) (Spain) 2029	To be determined				In progress		
Total	5/42	34	16	18	198	84	114

== Results and fixtures ==
Win Loss

=== 2025 ===
27 November 2025 2027 FIBA World Cup qualifiers – 1st round	Serbia	90–86	Switzerland	Belgrade, Serbia
19:00 (UTC+1)	Scoring by quarter: 20–30, 14–27, 25–13, 31–16
	Pts: Ristić 24; Rebs: Miljenović 8 Asts: Miljenović 9	Boxscore	Pts: Schumacher 19; Rebs: T. Ročak 5 Asts: Fofana 5	Arena: Aleksandar Nikolić Hall; Attendance: 2,000; Referees: Ariadna Chueca (ESP), Georgios Poursanidis (GRE), Edgard Ceccarelli (FRA)

30 November 2025 2027 FIBA World Cup qualifiers – 1st round	Switzerland	60–85	Turkey	Fribourg, Switzerland
17:00 (UTC+1)	Scoring by quarter: 17–23, 8–18, 17–24, 18–20
	Pts: Fofana 17; Rebs: Mambo 6 Asts: Fofana 4	Boxscore	Pts: Saybir 19; Rebs: Yurtseven 5 Asts: Sipahi 6	Arena: Site Sportif Saint-Léonard; Attendance: 3,000; Referees: Luis Castillo (ESP), Marius Ciulin (ROU), Blaž Zupančič (SVN)

=== 2026 ===
27 February 2026 2027 FIBA World Cup qualifiers – 1st round	Bosnia and Herzegovina	84–60	Switzerland	Tuzla, Bosnia and Herzegovina
20:00 (UTC+1)	Scoring by quarter: 20–12, 21–15, 23–16, 20–17
	Pts: Vrabac 15; Rebs: Sulejmanović 9 Asts: Atić 9	Boxscore	Pts: Schumacher 19; Rebs: Mambo 10; Asts: Schumacher 3	Arena: SKPC Mejdan; Attendance: 5,000; Referees: Georgios Poursanidis (GRE), Martin Horozov (BUL), Ioannis Agrafiotis (GRE)

2 March 2026 2027 FIBA World Cup qualifiers – 1st round	Switzerland	60–91	Bosnia and Herzegovina	Kriens, Switzerland
19:00 (UTC+1)	Scoring by quarter: 14–21, 20–29, 18–24, 8–17
	Pts: Mbala 9 Rebs: Granvorka 10; Asts: Schumacher 9	Boxscore	Pts: Musa 25; Rebs: Kamenjaš 8 Asts: Talić 6	Arena: Pilatus Arena; Attendance: 3,820; Referees: Ariadna Chueca (ESP), Gintaras Mačiulis (LTU), Ilias Kounellis (CYP)

2 July 2026 2027 FIBA World Cup qualifiers – 1st round	Switzerland	73–97	Serbia	Fribourg, Switzerland
20:00 (UTC+2)	Scoring by quarter: 27–30, 17–19, 13–17, 16–31
	Pts: Schumacher 19; Rebs: Soroa 5 Asts: three players 2	Boxscore	Pts: Jokić, Jović 22; Rebs: Jokić 14; Asts: Jokić 7	Arena: BCF Arena; Attendance: 8,113; Referees: Mārtiņš Kozlovskis (LAT), Juozas Barkauskas (LTU), Sergii Zashchuk (UKR)

6 July 2026 2027 FIBA World Cup qualifiers – 1st round	Turkey	95–72	Switzerland	Istanbul, Turkey
19:00 (UTC+3)	Scoring by quarter: 22–19, 25–22, 29–11, 19–20
	Pts: Yurtseven 18; Rebs: Bona 8 Asts: Şengün, Sipahi 5	Boxscore	Pts: Schumacher 23; Rebs: Schumacher, Soroa 4 Asts: Schumacher 5	Arena: Sinan Erdem Dome; Attendance: 14,508; Referees: Andris Aunkrogers (LAT), Edgard Ceccarelli (FRA), Silvia Marziali (ESP)

27 August 2026 EuroBasket 2029 pre-qualifiers – 2nd round	Switzerland	75–110	Great Britain	Fribourg, Switzerland
19:00 (UTC+2)	Scoring by quarter: 19–25, 19–25, 13–29, 24–31
	Pts: Schumacher 20; Rebs: N. Ročak 7 Asts: Schumacher 3	Boxscore	Pts: Uduje 24; Rebs: three players 7 Asts: Watson-Gayle 8	Arena: Halle Omnisport Saint-Léonard; Attendance: 1,020; Referees: Ivor Matějek (CZE), Łukasz Jankowski (POL), Rainis Värv (EST)

26 November 2026 EuroBasket 2029 pre-qualifiers – 2nd round	Slovakia	vs.	Switzerland	Bratislava, Slovakia
18:00 (UTC+1)
		Boxscore		Arena: Gopass Arena

29 November 2026 EuroBasket 2029 pre-qualifiers – 2nd round	Great Britain	vs.	Switzerland	Newcastle, England
15:00 (UTC+0)
		Boxscore		Arena: Vertu Arena

=== 2027 ===
28 February 2027 EuroBasket 2029 pre-qualifiers – 2nd round	Switzerland	vs.	Slovakia	Switzerland
--:-- (UTC+1)
		Boxscore

== Team ==
=== Current roster ===
Roster for the EuroBasket 2029 Pre-Qualifiers match on 27 August 2026 against Great Britain.

Switzerland men's national basketball team roster
Players
Coaches

Pos.	No.	Name	Age – Date of birth	Height	Club	Ctr.
G	0	Boris Mbala	30 – 19 January 1996	1.90 m (6 ft 3 in)	Lions de Genève	(Switzerland)
PG	1	Alex Schumacher	25 – 20 February 2001	1.91 m (6 ft 3 in)	Lietkabelis	(Lithuania)
PG	2	Lukas Keredzin	21 – 2 July 2005	1.87 m (6 ft 2 in)	Union Neuchâtel	(Switzerland)
SF	3	Yoan Granvorka	29 – 9 June 1997	2.01 m (6 ft 7 in)	Pully	(Switzerland)
F/C	5	Nico Ročak	25 – 21 February 2001	2.03 m (6 ft 8 in)	Tizona	(Spain)
SG	11	Emmanuel Kupa	20 – 11 January 2006	1.92 m (6 ft 4 in)	Fribourg	(Switzerland)
PF	13	Killian Martin	28 – 3 April 1998	2.03 m (6 ft 8 in)	Donar	(Netherlands)
F	19	Noé Anabir	31 – 28 May 1995	2.03 m (6 ft 8 in)	Lions de Genève	(Switzerland)
F	22	Kevin Martina	25 – 14 April 2001	2.03 m (6 ft 8 in)	Union Neuchâtel	(Switzerland)
PG	24	Achile Spadone	22 – 24 September 2003	1.93 m (6 ft 4 in)	Davidson Wildcats	(United States)
C	43	Yasmin Mambo	23 – 24 September 2002	2.06 m (6 ft 9 in)	Blois	(France)
PF	56	Zachary Biku	21 – 23 April 2005	2.03 m (6 ft 8 in)	Monthey	(Switzerland)

Head coach

- (Belgium) Thibaut Petit

Assistant coach(es)

- (Belgium) Niels Marnegrave
- (Switzerland) Randoald Dessarzin

Legend

- (C) Team captain
- Club – describes last
  club before the competition
- Age – describes age
  on 27 August 2026

=== Depth chart ===
Pos.	Starting 5	Bench 1	Bench 2
C	Nico Ročak	Yasmin Mambo
PF	Kevin Martina	Killian Martin	Zachary Biku
SF	Yoan Granvorka	Noé Anabir
SG	Boris Mbala	Emmanuel Kupa
PG	Alex Schumacher	Achile Spadone	Lukas Keredzin

=== Head coach position ===
- (Switzerland) Sébastian Roduit – (2008–2012)
- (Bosnia and Herzegovina) Petar Aleksić – (2013–2017)
- (Switzerland) Gianluca Barilari – (2017–2021)
- (Greece) Ilias Papatheodorou – (2021–2026)
- (Belgium) Thibaut Petit – (2026–present)

=== Notable players ===
- Thabo Sefolosha – First Swiss-born player to get drafted and play in the NBA.
- Clint Capela

=== Past rosters ===
1935 EuroBasket: finished 4th among 10 teams

3 René Karlen, 4 Raymond Lambercy, 5 Mottier, 6 Jean Pare, 7 Radle, 8 Sidler, 9 Marcel Wuilleumier (Coach: ?)

1936 Olympic Games: finished 9th among 21 teams

1 Fernand Bergmann, 2 Pierre Carlier, 3 René Karlen, 4 Georges Laederach, 5 Raymond Lambercy, 6 Jean Pollet, 7 Jean Pare, 8 Marcel Wuilleumier (Coach: ?)

1946 EuroBasket: finished 5th among 10 teams

3 Georges Stockly, 4 Fernand Keller, 5 Theo Winkler, 7 Georges Gallay, 8 Henry Gujer, 10 Robert Geiser, 12 Jean Pollet, 13 Jean Pare, 15 René Wohler, 20 Louis Sanguin (Coach: ?)

1948 Olympic Games: finished 21st among 23 teams

3 Georges Stockly, 4 Henry Gujer, 5 Jean Pollet, 6 Maurice Chollet, 7 Claude Chevalley, 8 Pierre Albrecht, 9 Marcos Bossy, 10 Robert Geiser, 11 Jean Tribolet, 12 Claude Landini, 13 Jean Pare, 14 Bernard Dutoit, 15 Henri Baumann, 16 Gérald Piaget (Coach: ?)

1951 EuroBasket: finished 13th among 17 teams

3 Georges Stockly, 4 Henry Gujer, 5 Theo Winkler, 6 Arthur Bugna, 7 Henri Baumann, 8 Roger Domenjoz, 9 Marcos Bossy, 10 René Wohler, 11 René Chiappino, 12 Bernard Dutoit, 13 Albert Hermann, 14 Roger Prahin, 15 Francis Perroud (Coach: ?)

1952 Olympic Games: finished 20th among 23 teams

3 Georges Stockly, 4 Pierre Albrecht, 5 Jacques Redard, 6 Gérald Cottier, 7 Henri Baumann, 8 Roger Domenjoz, 9 Marcos Bossy, 10 René Wohler, 11 René Chiappino, 12 Marcel Moget, 13 Maurice Chollet, 14 Roger Prahin, 15 Bernard Schmied, 16 Jean-Pierre Voisin (Coach: ?)

1953 EuroBasket: finished 11th among 17 teams

3 André Laverniaz, 4 Pierre Albrecht, 5 Jacques Redard, 6 Henri Devaud, 7 Albert Hermann, 8 René Hofmann, 9 Marcos Bossy, 10 Gérald Cottier, 11 René Chiappino, 12 Jean Emery, 13 Pierre Wittwer, 14 Michel Currat, 15 Jean-Pierre Voisin, 16 Ruggero Balmelli (Coach: ?)

1955 EuroBasket: finished 14th among 18 teams

4 Pierre Albrecht, 5 Jacques Redard, 6 Michel Currat, 7 Henri Baumann, 8 V Bally, 9 C Sevelley, 10 Gérald Cottier, 11 Marcos Bossy, 12 René Chiappino, 13 M Etter, 14 C Lambrecht, 15 Jean-Pierre Voisin, 16 P Worte, 17 M Robert (Coach: ?)

== Kit ==
=== Manufacturer ===
- Erima
- 2017: Li-Ning
- 2018: 14Fourteen

=== Sponsor ===
2017: Tissot

== See also ==
- Sport in Switzerland
- Switzerland women's national basketball team
- Switzerland men's national under-20 basketball team
- Switzerland men's national under-18 basketball team
- Switzerland men's national under-16 basketball team
- Switzerland men's national 3x3 team
