= EuroBasket 1935 =

International basketball event

Championnat Européen Basketball (French)

Tournament details
- Host country: Switzerland
- City: Geneva
- Dates: 2–4 May
- Teams: 10
- Venue(s): 1 (in 1 host city)

Final positions
- Champions: Latvia (1st title)
- Runners-up: Spain
- Third place: Czechoslovakia
- Fourth place: Switzerland

Tournament statistics
- Games played: 17
- MVP: (Spain) Rafael Martín
- Top scorer: (Italy) Livio Franceschini (16.5 points per game)

The 1935 FIBA European Championship, commonly called EuroBasket 1935, was the first FIBA EuroBasket regional basketball championship, held by FIBA, as well as a test event preceding the first Olympic basketball tournament at the 1936 Summer Olympics. Ten national teams affiliated with the International Basketball Federation (FIBA) took part in the competition. The event was hosted by Switzerland and held in Geneva in May, 1935.

The 2012 Latvian film Dream Team 1935 is based on the events of the tournament. It tells the story of the Latvia team, the winners of the tournament.

== Preliminary round ==
Before the tournament began, a qualification game was played between Spain and Portugal. The game was held in Madrid, Spain and refereed by Spanish coach Mariano Manent. Spain won, 33–12.

15 April 1935

| Spain | 33–12 | Portugal |
Scoring by half: 16–6, 17–6

Madrid

== Results ==
=== Classification round ===
The classification round served to place the six teams eliminated in the preliminary round into places 5 through 10.

5th–10th place quarterfinals
Bulgaria | 22
Hungary | 19
France | 66
Romania | 23

5th–8th place semifinals
Belgium | 29
Bulgaria | 11
Italy | 27
France | 29

Fifth place match
Belgium | 30
France | 49
Seventh place match
Bulgaria | 22
Italy | 35

| Ninth place match |
| Hungary | 24 |
| Romania | 17 |

=== 5th–10th place quarterfinals ===
3 May 1935
20:00

| Bulgaria | 22–19 | Hungary |
Scoring by half: 16–6, 6–13

Palais des Expositions, Geneva

3 May 1935
20:50

| Romania | 23–66 | France |
Scoring by half: 11–40, 12–26

Palais des Expositions, Geneva

=== 5th–8th place semifinals ===
4 May 1935

| Belgium | 29–11 | Bulgaria |
Scoring by half: 16–2, 13–9

Palais des Expositions, Geneva

4 May 1935

| Italy | 27–29 | France |
Scoring by half: 16–17, 11–12

Palais des Expositions, Geneva

=== Ninth place match ===
| Hungary | 24–17 | Romania |
Scoring by half: 9–12, 15–5

Palais des Expositions, Geneva

=== Seventh place match ===
4 May 1935
20:00

| Bulgaria | 22–35 | Italy |
Scoring by half: 2–16, 20–19

Palais des Expositions, Geneva

=== Fifth place match ===
4 May 1935
20:50

| France | 49–30 | Belgium |
Scoring by half: 31–8, 18–22

Palais des Expositions, Geneva

== Final round ==
Round of 16
2 May 1935
Switzerland | 42
Romania | 9
2 May 1935
Italy | 42
Bulgaria | 23

Quarterfinals
2 May 1935
Latvia | 46
Hungary | 12
3 May 1935
Switzerland | 27
Italy | 17
2 May 1935
Spain | 25
Belgium | 17
2 May 1935
France | 21
Czechoslovakia | 23

Semifinals
3 May 1935
Latvia | 28
Switzerland | 19
3 May 1935
Spain | 21
Czechoslovakia | 17

Final
4 May 1935
Latvia | 24
Spain | 18
Bronze medal match
4 May 1935
Switzerland | 23
Czechoslovakia | 25

=== Round of 16 ===
2 May 1935
21:50

| Italy | 42–23 | Bulgaria |
Scoring by half: 16–6, 26–17

Palais des Expositions, Geneva

2 May 1935
22:40

| Switzerland | 42–9 | Romania |
Scoring by half: 25–3, 17–6

Palais des Expositions, Geneva

=== Quarterfinals ===
2 May 1935
16:00

| Spain | 25–17 | Belgium |
Scoring by half: 14–7, 11–10

Palais des Expositions, Geneva
Referees: Lucini (Switzerland)

2 May 1935
16:50

| Latvia | 46–12 | Hungary |
Scoring by half: 20–7, 26–5

Palais des Expositions, Geneva
Referees: M. Pfeuti (Switzerland)

2 May 1935
21:00

| France | 21–23 | Czechoslovakia |
Scoring by half: 13–16, 8–7

Palais des Expositions, Geneva

3 May 1935
15:00

| Switzerland | 27–17 | Italy |
Scoring by half: 15–15, 12–2

Palais des Expositions, Geneva
Referees: M. Creus (France)

=== Semifinals ===
3 May 1935
22:30

| Latvia | 28–19 | Switzerland |
Scoring by half: 16–12, 12–7

Palais des Expositions, Geneva

3 May 1935
21:40

| Czechoslovakia | 17–21 | Spain |
Scoring by half: 10–10, 7–11

Palais des Expositions, Geneva

=== Bronze medal match ===
4 May 1935
21:40

| Switzerland | 23–25 | Czechoslovakia |
Scoring by half: 15–16, 8–9

Palais des Expositions, Geneva

=== Final ===
4 May 1935
22:30

| Latvia | 24–18 | Spain |
Scoring by half: 16–8, 8–10
| Pts: Jurcins 11 | | Pts: Rafael Martin 6 |

Palais des Expositions, Geneva

1935 FIBA EuroBasket champions

Latvia
1st title

== Final standings ==
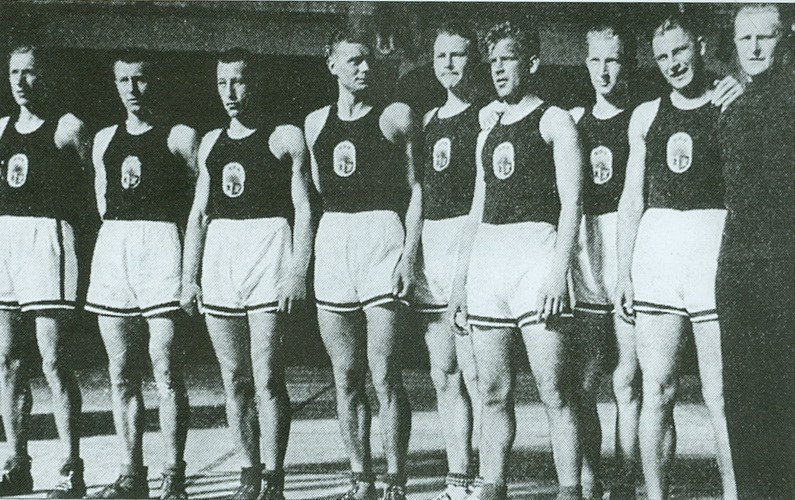
Latvia men's national basketball team members during EuroBasket 1935

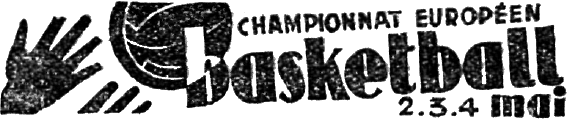
EuroBasket 1935 logo in a Swiss journal

| Rank | Team | Pld | W | L | PF | PA | PD | Pts |
|---|---|---|---|---|---|---|---|---|
| 1st place, gold medalist(s) | Latvia | 3 | 3 | 0 | 98 | 49 | +49 | 6 |
| 2nd place, silver medalist(s) | Spain | 3 | 2 | 1 | 64 | 58 | +6 | 5 |
| 3rd place, bronze medalist(s) | Czechoslovakia | 3 | 2 | 1 | 65 | 65 | 0 | 5 |
| 4 | Switzerland | 4 | 2 | 2 | 111 | 79 | +32 | 6 |
| 5 | France | 4 | 3 | 1 | 165 | 103 | +62 | 7 |
| 6 | Belgium | 3 | 1 | 2 | 76 | 85 | −9 | 4 |
| 7 | Italy | 4 | 2 | 2 | 121 | 101 | +20 | 6 |
| 8 | Bulgaria | 4 | 1 | 3 | 78 | 125 | −47 | 5 |
| 9 | Hungary | 3 | 1 | 2 | 55 | 85 | −30 | 4 |
| 10 | Romania | 3 | 0 | 3 | 49 | 132 | −83 | 3 |

== Team rosters ==
1. Latvia: Eduards Andersons, Aleksejs Anufrijevs, Mārtiņš Grundmanis, Herberts Gubiņš, Rūdolfs Jurciņš, Jānis Lidmanis, Džems Raudziņš, Visvaldis Melderis (Coach: Valdemārs Baumanis)
2. Spain: Rafael Martín, Emilio Alonso, Pedro Alonso, Juan Carbonell, Armando Maunier, Fernando Muscat, Cayetano Ortega, Rafael Ruano (Coach: Mariano Manent)
3. Czechoslovakia: Jiří Čtyřoký, Jan Fertek, Josef Franc, Josef Klima, Josef Moc, František Picek, Vaclav Voves
4. Switzerland: René Karlen, Jean Pollet, Raymond Lambercy, Marcel Wuilleumier, Jean Pare, Mottier, Radle, Sidler
5. Bulgaria: Nikola Rogatchev, Etropolski, Krum Konstantinov, Pinkas,
