= 2013 Polish Basketball Supercup =

Basketball game marking the start of the 2013/2014 basketball season in Poland

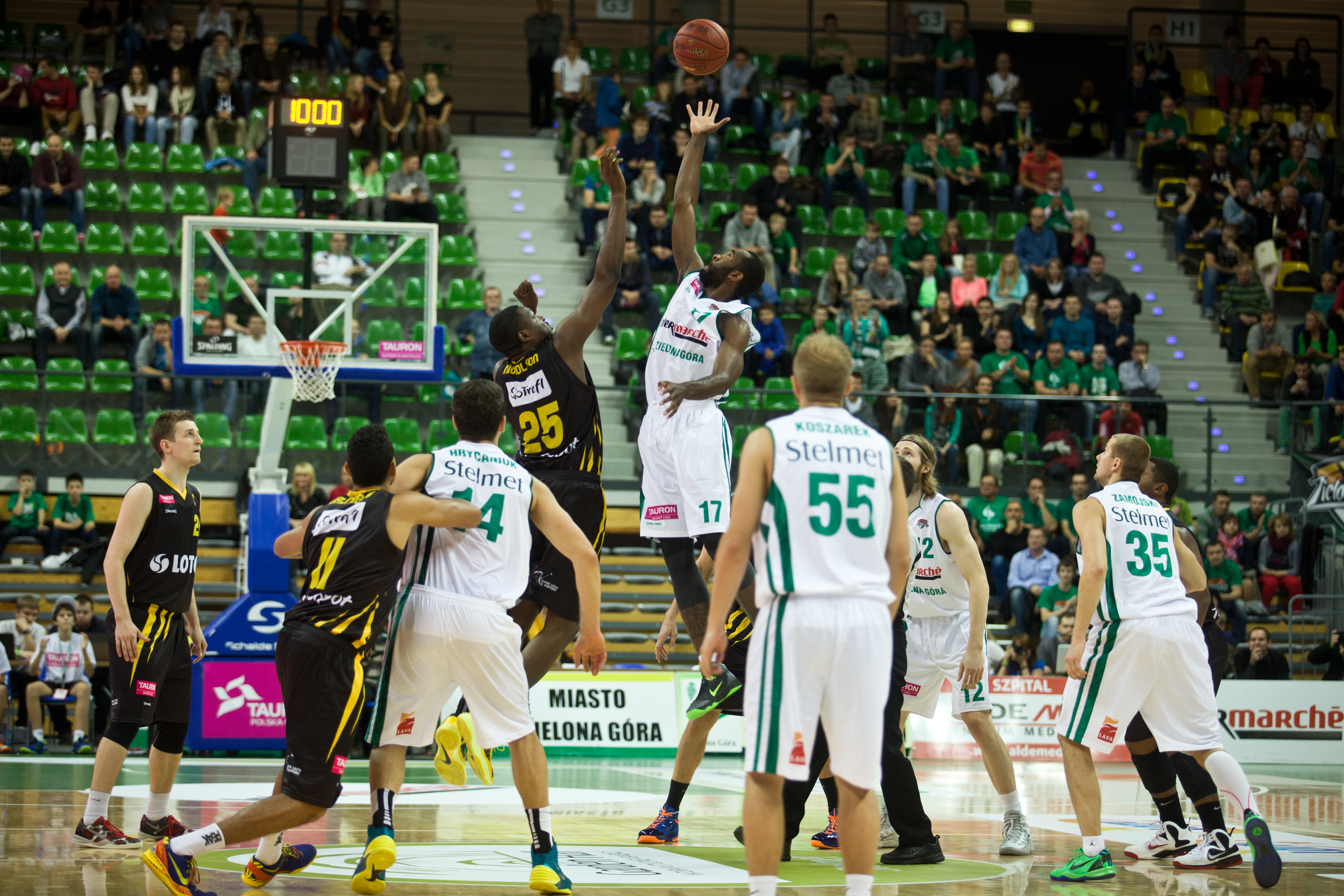
- Start of the game – Christian Eyenga (Stelmet) and Yemi Gardi-Nicholson (Trefl) jumping to the ball
Trefl Sopot	Stelmet Zielona Góra
76	71
- Date: October 9, 2013
- Venue: CRS Hall Zielona Góra, Zielona Góra
- MVP: Šarūnas Vasiliauskas
- Referees: Marcin Kowalski; Tomasz Trawicki; Marek Maliszewski

2013 Polish Basketball Supercup was a basketball game marking the start of the 2013/2014 basketball season in Poland, in which the Polish champion team from the 2012/2013 season (Stelmet Zielona Góra) played against the Polish Cup winner from the same season (Trefl Sopot). The match, held on 9 October 2013, at CRS Hall Zielona Góra, ended with Trefl winning 76:71. The MVP was Lithuanian Šarūnas Vasiliauskas. The title sponsor of the game was Tauron Polska, and it was broadcast on the Polsat Sport News TV channel.

== Before the game ==
=== Participants ===
The participants of the 2013 Polish Basketball Supercup were the teams that won the most important Polish basketball competitions in the 2012/2013 season – Stelmet Zielona Góra (Polish Basketball League) and Trefl Sopot (Polish Basketball Cup winners).

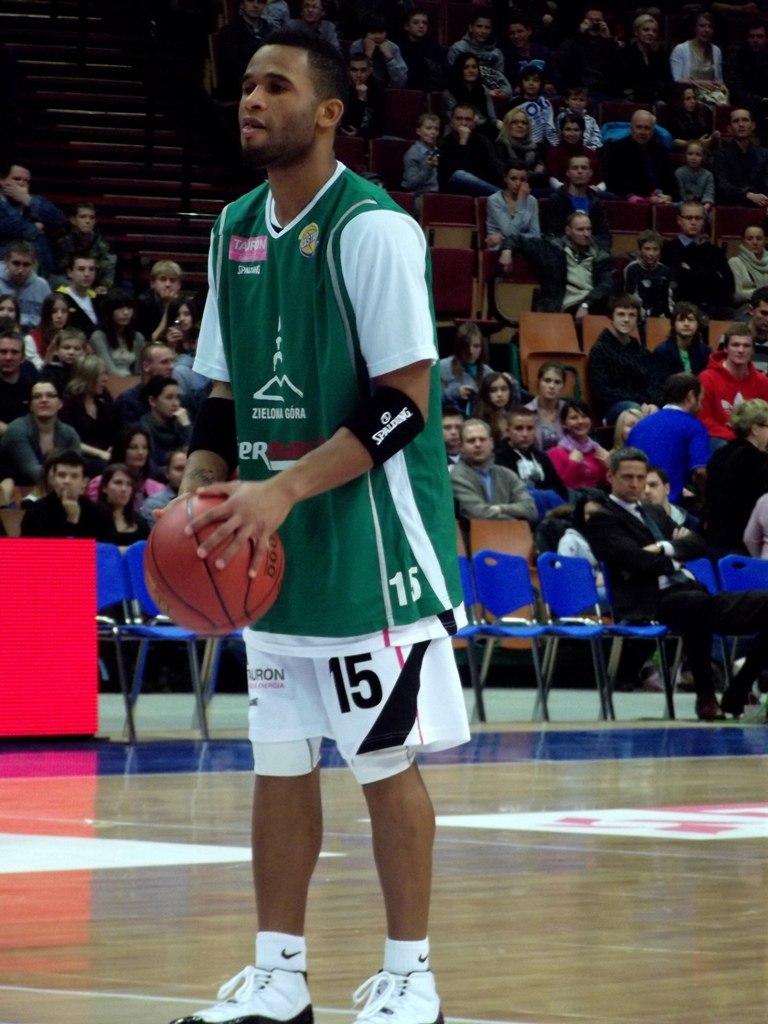
Walter Hodge was one of the players who left Stelmet Zielona Góra after winning the Polish championship

Trefl Sopot won the Polish Cup in the 2012/2013 season by defeating the local team AZS Koszalin 64:59 in the final held in Koszalin. This was Trefl Sopot's second consecutive triumph in this competition, allowing them to compete in the Polish Supercup for the second year in a row – the previous year, they defeated Asseco Prokom Gdynia in this competition.

Stelmet Zielona Góra won their first-ever Polish championship in the 2012/2013 season, defeating Turów Zgorzelec 4:0 in the final series. Their participation in the 2013 Polish Basketball Supercup marked their first appearance in this competition.

The 2013 Polish Basketball Supercup match was the first official game of the 2013/2014 basketball season in Poland. Since both teams were still in the preparation phase, journalists suggested that the game might not fully reflect the level of both teams. Additionally, both clubs experienced significant roster changes – Stelmet lost players such as Walter Hodge and Quinton Hosley, while Trefl lost Filip Dylewicz. Journalists gave Stelmet slightly higher chances of winning, believing they had a stronger lineup.

=== Organization of the event ===
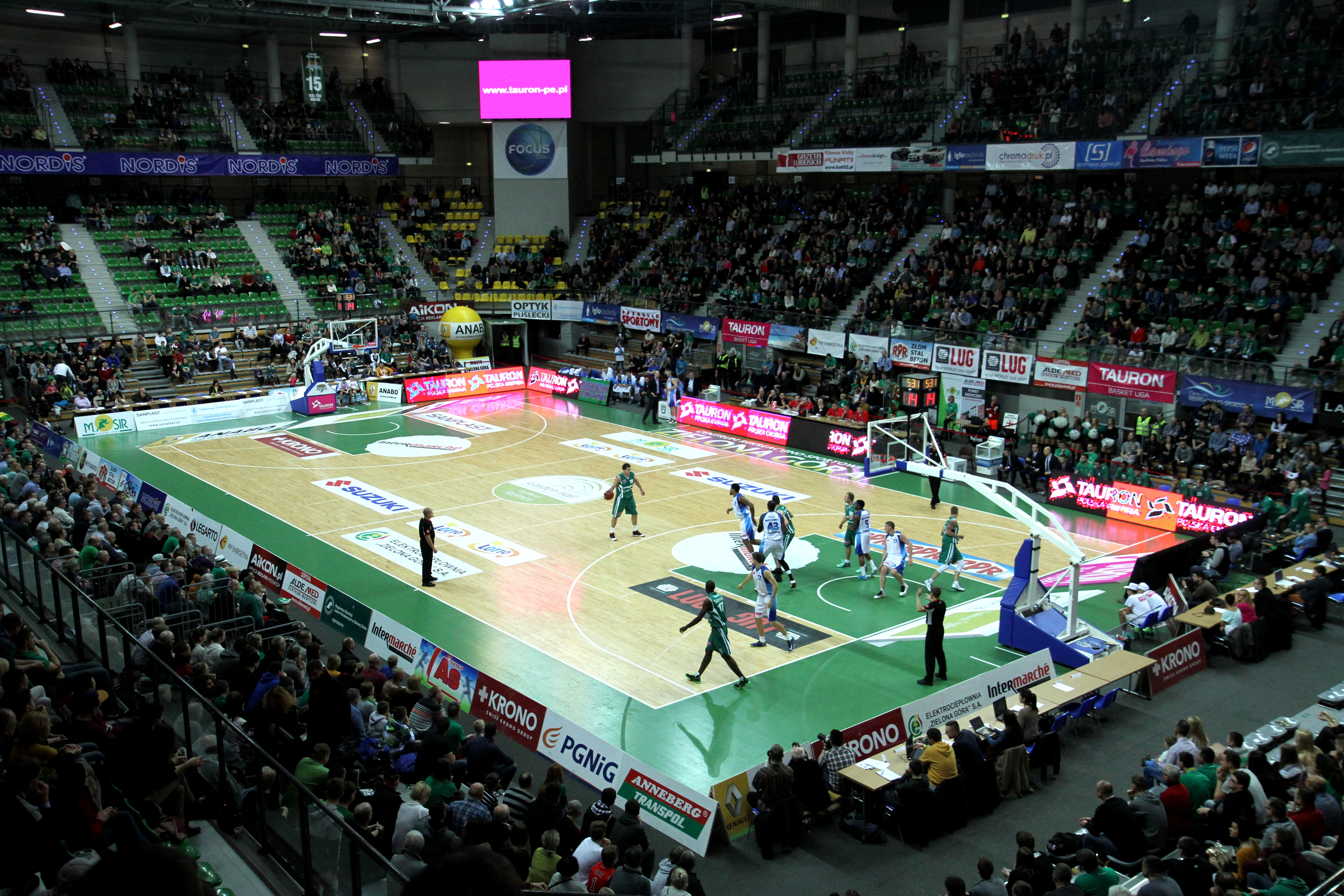
CRS Hall Zielona Góra during the Polish Basketball League match

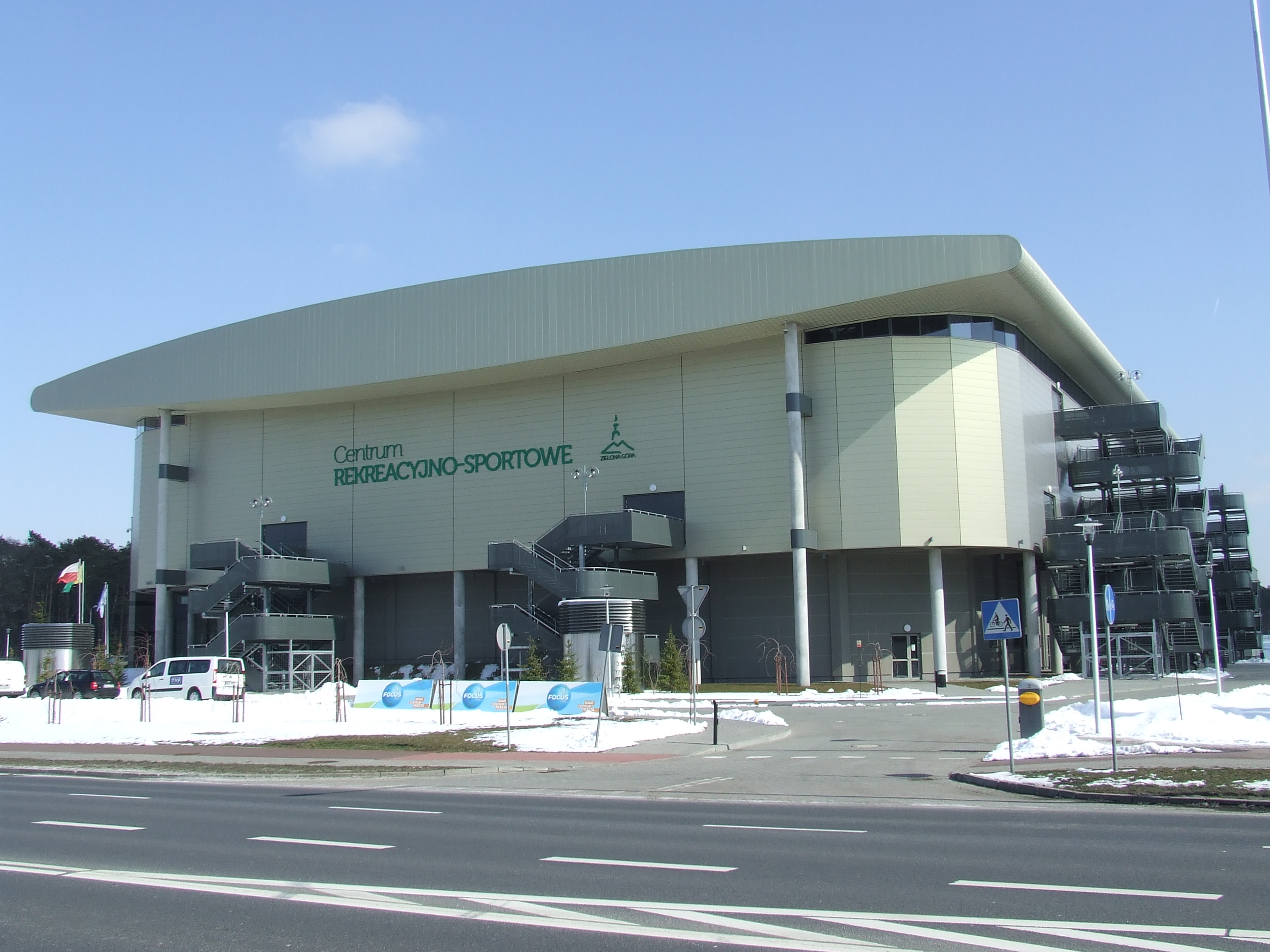
Outside view of the CRS Hall Zielona Góra

The Polish Basketball League decided on the venue for the 2013 Polish Basketball Supercup in late August 2013. Like the previous year (when the Supercup was played at the Gdynia Arena, the home of the 2011/2012 Polish champions Asseco Prokom Gdynia), the event was held at the arena of the reigning Polish champions. This time, the venue was CRS Hall Zielona Góra, where the 2012/2013 Polish champions Stelmet Zielona Góra have been playing since the 2010/2011 season. This hall has a capacity of about 5,000 people.

Prior to the 2013 Polish Basketball Supercup, CRS Hall had hosted other basketball events – in addition to Stelmet Zielona Góra's games (formerly Zastal), it hosted EuroCup Basketball games, EuroBasket 2013 qualification match between Poland and Switzerland, and the 2011/2012 Polish Cup finals.

Ticket sales for the 2013 Polish Basketball Supercup began on 2 October 2013, one week before the game. Ticket prices ranged from 11 to 35 PLN (discounted tickets) and from 20 to 45 PLN (regular tickets), and they could be purchased both online and at eight sales points in Zielona Góra.

== Game progression ==
=== First quarter ===
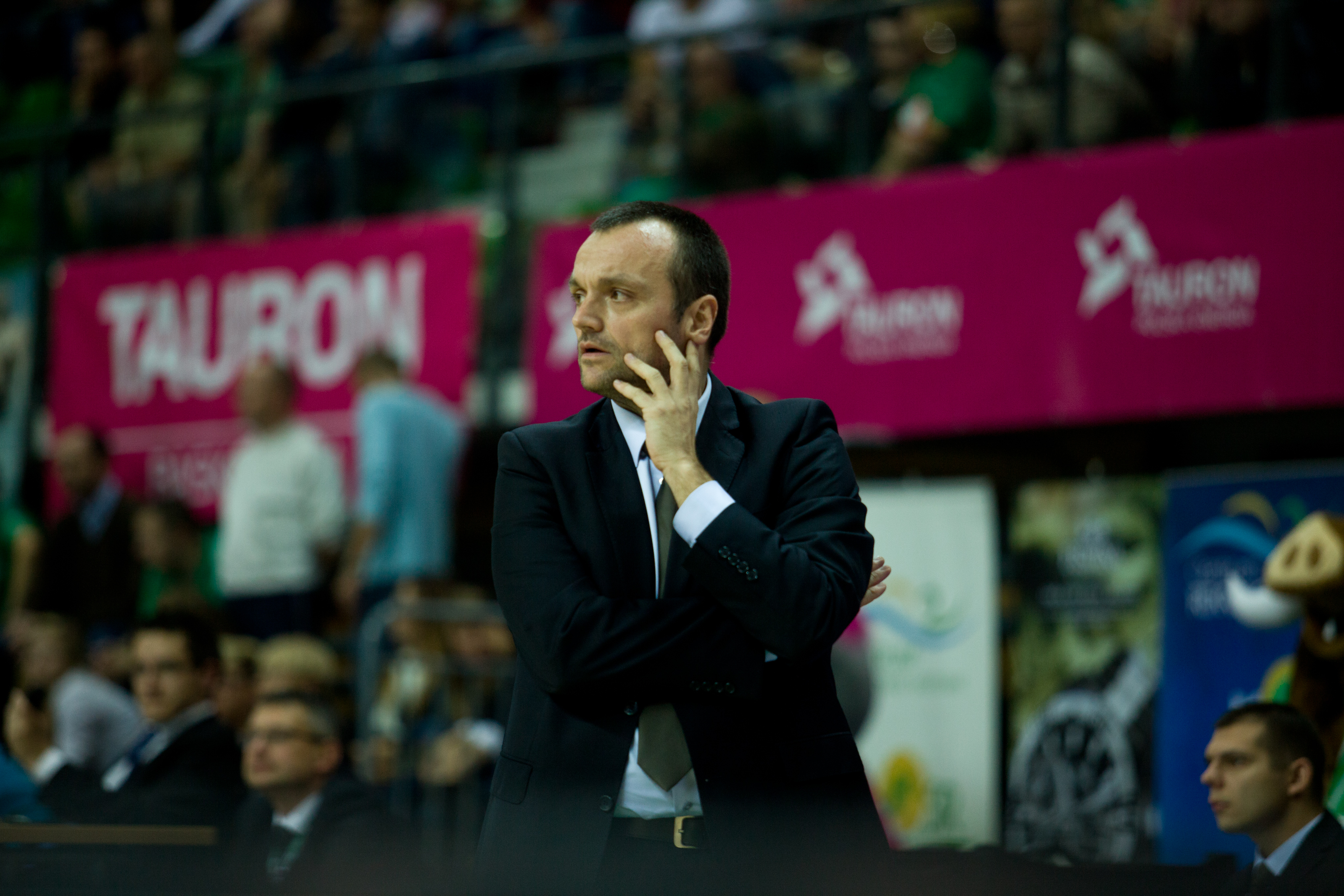
Mihailo Uvalin during the 2013 Polish Basketball Supercup

The first points of the match were scored in the 61st second by Trefl Sopot's center Yemi Gadri-Nicholson. At the beginning of the game, both teams played evenly, with coaches Mihailo Uvalin (Stelmet) and Darius Maskoliūnas (Trefl) making frequent substitutions. After Šarūnas Vasiliauskas hit a three-pointer in the 8th minute, Trefl took a 6-point lead (10:16). Towards the end of the first quarter, following a series of four successful free throws by Christian Eyenga and Erving Walker (each made two), the hosts reduced the deficit to one point. After Lance Jeter missed a three-point attempt, this part of the game ended with a score of 17:18.

=== Second quarter ===
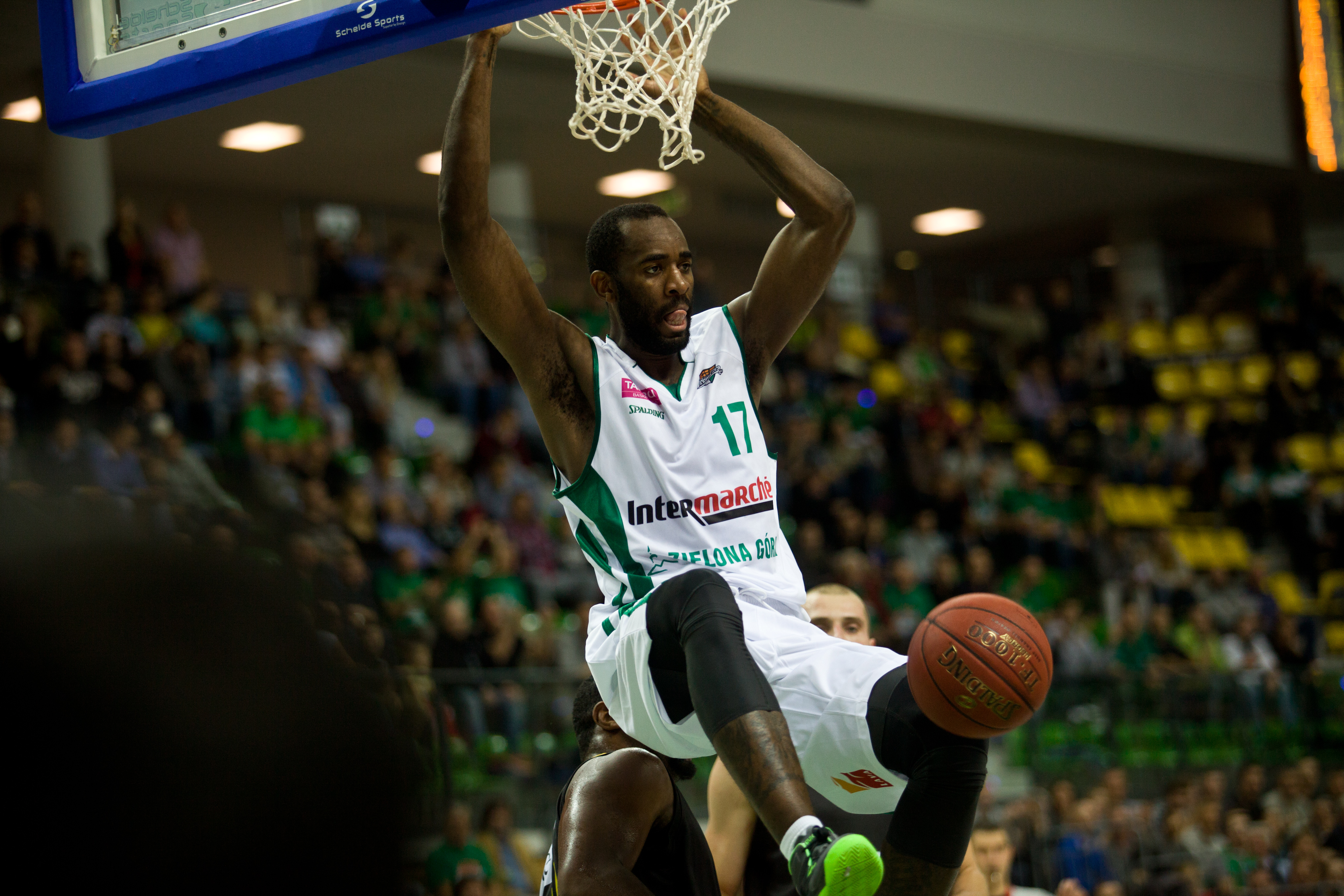
Christian Eyenga performing a dunk during the 2013 Polish Basketball Supercup game

At the beginning of the second quarter, Trefl Sopot increased their lead once again, reaching 6 points (17:23). After a timeout called by Mihailo Uvalin, the hosts went on a 13:0 run. Christian Eyenga played a significant role in this run, scoring 8 consecutive points starting from 17:23, which included a dunk, a block on Marcin Stefański, a two-pointer, one successful and one missed free throw, and a three-pointer. The quarter ended with Stelmet winning 22:14, leading the game 39:32 overall. Eyenga was the top scorer in the first half with 17 points, while Stefański stood out for Trefl with 6 points and 9 rebounds.

=== Third quarter ===
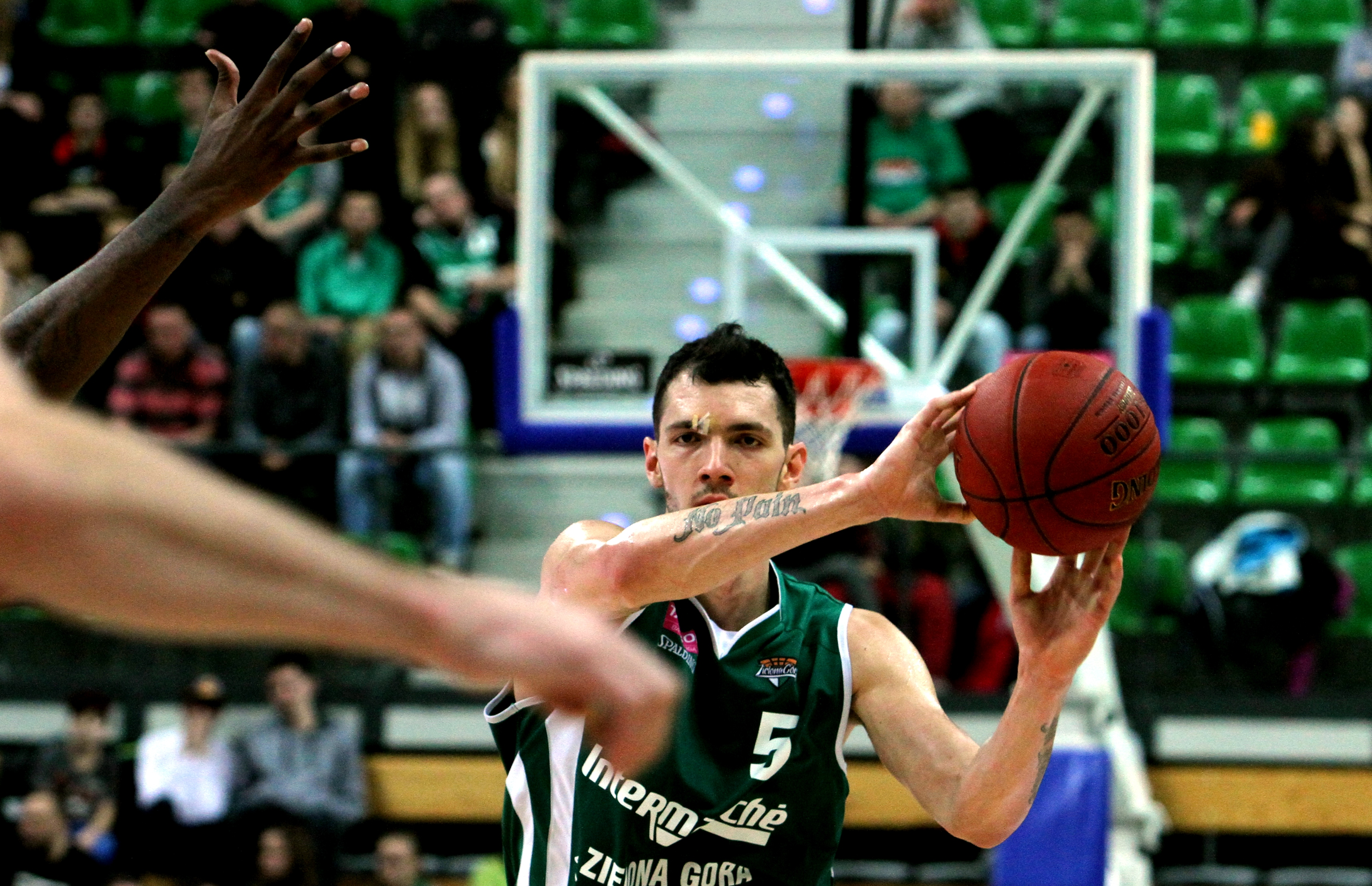
After points scored by Aaron Cel, Stelmet Zielona Góra achieved the highest lead in the game

For most of the third quarter, Stelmet Zielona Góra gradually increased their lead over their rivals. After Aaron Cel scored 5 consecutive points, they achieved a 15-point lead, the highest in the game (56:41). In the last 3 minutes of this quarter, Trefl scored two two-pointers and two three-pointers, tallying 10 consecutive points without conceding any, thus winning the third quarter 19:17. Going into the final quarter, Stelmet led 56:51.

=== Fourth quarter ===
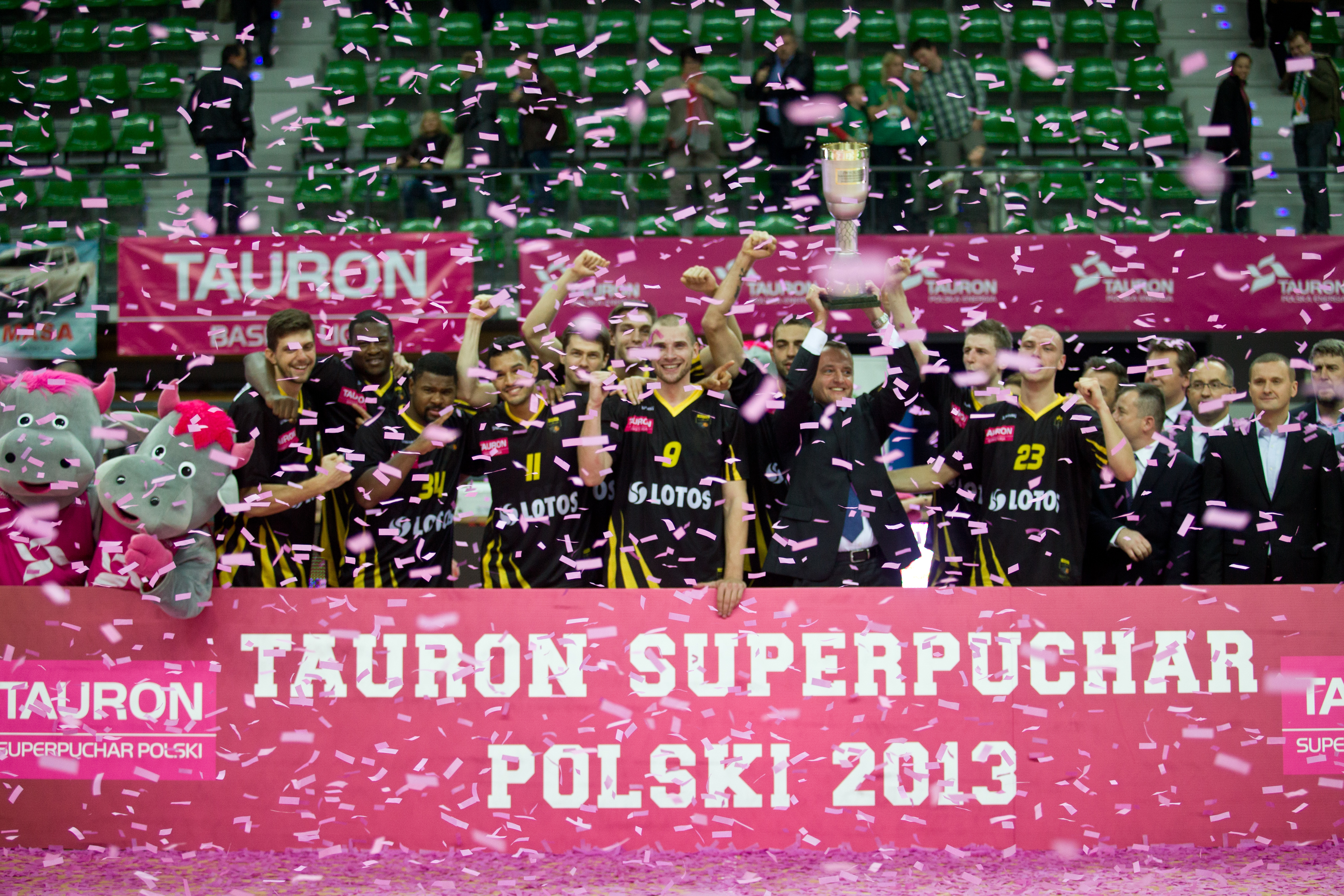
Trefl Sopot – winners of the 2013 Polish Basketball Supercup

At the start of the final quarter, Trefl scored another 5 points without conceding any, continuing their run from the end of the third quarter to a total of 18:0. In the 32nd minute, Adam Waczyński's successful free throws tied the game at 56:56, and soon after, a shot by Michał Michalak gave Trefl a 58:56 lead, which Stelmet could not regain. In the 36th minute, after a successful shot by Paweł Leończyk, Trefl achieved their highest lead of this quarter, 9 points (59:68). Stelmet managed to narrow the gap, and after 3 successful free throws by Erving Walker, the hosts were trailing by 1 point with about 180 seconds left. However, Trefl was more effective in the closing moments, first scoring 2 points through Waczyński, and then 4 points from free throws by Waczyński and Michalak. Walker also scored 2 points from free throws during this period. With 14 seconds left and the score at 71:76, Mihailo Uvalin called a timeout, but Łukasz Koszarek missed a three-point attempt in the ensuing play. After this attempt, the hosts stopped intentionally fouling their opponents, who did not make another attack. Trefl won the last quarter 25:15 and the match 76:71, securing their second consecutive Polish Basketball Supercup. Lithuanian Šarūnas Vasiliauskas, who scored 20 points, hitting 6 of 8 three-point attempts, was awarded the MVP title of the 2013 Polish Basketball Supercup.

== Summary ==
=== Statistics ===
==== Stelmet Zielona Góra ====
Number	Player	Points	Time of game	2P		3P		FG		Free throws		Rebounds			Assists	Fouls	Fouls drawn	Turnovers	Steals	Blocks	Blocked shots	EVAL	+/−
Number	Player	Points	Time of game	Made/attempted	Goal percentage	Made	%	Made	%	Made	%	Offensive rebounds	Defensive rebounds	Total rebounds	Assists	Fouls	Fouls drawn	Turnovers	Steals	Blocks	Blocked shots	EVAL	+/−
5	Aaron Cel	5	11:09	1/1	100.0	1/3	33.3	2/4	50.0				2	2						1		6	-12
11	Erving Walker	7	12:54			0/3	0.0	0/3	0.0	7/7	100.0		1	1	2		3	3				4	-9
12	David Barlow	3	22:56	0/2	0.0	1/3	33.3	1/5	20.0			1	3	4		4		1	1		1	3	8
13	Kamil Chanas	0	05:56	0/1	0.0	0/1	0.0	0/2	0.0							2						-2	-8
14	Adam Hrycaniuk	8	27:46	4/4	100.0			4/4	100.0			5	1	6	1	3	4		2	1		18	7
17	Christian Eyenga	29	31:29	9/16	56.3	2/3	66.7	11/19	57.9	5/8	62.5	1	3	4	3		8	2		2		25	10
20	Maciej Kucharek	did not play																					
21	Craig Brackins	1	14:14	0/2	0.0			0/2	0,0	1/2	50.0				1		1		1			0	-8
31	Marcin Sroka	8	19:19			2/4	50.0	2/4	50,0	2/2	100.0	1	2	3		2	1	1				8	-11
35	Przemysław Zamojski	6	22:37	0/2	0.0	2/7	28.6	2/9	22,2			1	3	4	1	2	1		1		1	5	-8
55	Łukasz Koszarek	4	31:40	2/4	50.0	0/6	0.0	2/10	20,0	0/1	0.0		5	5	5	2	3	1	2		1	6	6
Team												1	1	2									
Total		71	200:00	16/32	50%	8/30	26.7%	24/62	38.7%	15/20	75%	9	20	29	13	15	21	8	7	4	3	73	

==== Trefl Sopot ====
Number	Player	Points	Time of game	2P		3P		FG		Free throws		Rebounds			Assists	Fouls	Fouls drawn	Turnovers	Steals	Blocks	Blocked shots	EVAL	+/−
Number	Player	Points	Time of game	Made/attempted	Goal percentage	Made/attempted	%	Made/attempted	%	Made/attempted	%	Offensive rebounds	Defensive rebounds	Total rebounds	Assists	Fouls	Fouls drawn	Turnovers	Steals	Blocks	Blocked shots	EVAL	+/−
5	Krzysztof Roszyk	0	05:41										1	1								1	-3
6	Łukasz Jaśkiewicz	did not play																					
9	Paweł Leończyk	10	28:23	5/7	71.4	0/1	0.0	5/8	62.5			1	2	3	1	1	1	2				9	-5
10	Marcin Stefański	8	23:38	4/7	57.1			4/7	57.1			4	8	12	2	3	3	1	1		2	19	10
11	David Brembly	3	04:56			1/1	100.0	1/1	100.0				1	1		1						4	3
13	Milan Majstorović	2	13:18	1/1	100.0	0/2	0.0	1/3	33.3			1		1	1	4				1		3	14
15	Šarūnas Vasiliauskas	20	26:22	1/4	25.0	6/8	75.0	7/12	58.3				1	1	3	3		2				17	7
21	Adam Waczyński	12	34:19	3/7	42.9	0/4	0.0	3/11	27.3	6/6	100.0		5	5	3	2	5	2		1		11	8
23	Michał Michalak	14	25:29	2/5	40.0	2/4	50.0	4/9	44.4	4/6	66.7	2	9	11	1	1	4	2	2		1	19	10
25	Yemi Gadri-Nicholson	6	13:24	3/4	75.0			3/4	75.0			3	3	6	2	3				1	1	14	-11
24	Lance Jeter	1	24:30	0/5	0.0	0/1	0.0	0/6	0.0	1/2	50.0		1	1	3	2	3					-5	-8
Team												2		2									
Total		76	200:00	19/40	47.5%	9/21	42.9%	28/61	45.9%	11/14	78.6%	11	31	42	16	21	15	12	3	3	4	92	
