= Pierre Albrecht =

Pierre Albrecht may refer to:

- Pierre Albrecht (basketball, born 1926) (1926–1971), Swiss basketball player
- Pierre Albrecht (basketball, born 1931) (1931–2019), Swiss basketball player
