= 2015–16 Kansas Jayhawks men's basketball team =

American college basketball season

2015–16 Kansas Jayhawks men's basketball

Big 12 tournament champions Big 12 regular season champions World University Games Gold Medal Maui Invitational tournament champions

NCAA tournament, Elite Eight
- Conference: Big 12 Conference

Ranking
- Coaches: No. 3
- AP: No. 1
- Record: 33–5 (15–3 Big 12)
- Head coach: Bill Self (13th season)
- Assistant coaches: Jerrance Howard (3rd season); Norm Roberts (5th season); Kurtis Townsend (12th season)
- Home arena: Allen Fieldhouse

2015–16 Big 12 men's basketball standings
	Conf.				Overall
Team	W		L	PCT	W		L	PCT
No. 1 Kansas †	15	–	3	.833	33	–	5	.868
No. 8 West Virginia	13	–	5	.722	26	–	9	.743
No. 7 Oklahoma	12	–	6	.667	29	–	8	.784
Texas	11	–	7	.611	20	–	13	.606
No. 21 Baylor	10	–	8	.556	22	–	12	.647
No. 22 Iowa State	10	–	8	.556	23	–	12	.657
Texas Tech	9	–	9	.500	19	–	13	.594
Kansas State	5	–	13	.278	17	–	16	.515
Oklahoma State	3	–	15	.167	12	–	20	.375
TCU	2	–	16	.111	12	–	21	.364
† 2016 Big 12 Tournament winner Rankings from AP poll

The 2015–16 Kansas Jayhawks men's basketball team represented the University of Kansas in the 2015–16 NCAA Division I men's basketball season, which is the Jayhawks 118th basketball season. The Jayhawks played their home games at Allen Fieldhouse. They were led by 13th year head coach Bill Self and were members of the Big 12 Conference. They finished the season 33–5, 15–3 in Big 12 play to win their 12th consecutive regular season Big 12 title. They defeated Kansas State, Baylor, and West Virginia to be champions of the Big 12 tournament. They received an automatic bid to the NCAA tournament where they were the tournament's overall #1 seed. They defeated Austin Peay, UConn, and Maryland to advance to the Elite Eight where they lost to Villanova.

The Jayhawks 12 consecutive regular season Big 12 titles was at the time the longest active consecutive conference title streak in the nation, as well as only being one shy of the NCAA record of 13, which is currently held by UCLA who won 13 in a row between 1967 and 1979.

In July 2015, the Jayhawks represented the United States at the World University Games in Gwangju, South Korea. The Jayhawks, along with Nic Moore from SMU and Julian DeBose from Florida Gulf Coast, went 8–0 to win the Gold Medal.

== Preseason ==
=== Departures ===
==== Graduation ====
Name	Position
Christian Garrett	G

==== Early draft entrants ====
Name	Position	Year
Kelly Oubre Jr.	G	Freshman
Cliff Alexander	F	Freshman

=== Transfers ===
Name	Position	Old school	New school
Josh Pollard	G	Kansas	Utah Valley
Dwight Coleby	C	Ole Miss	Kansas

=== Recruiting ===
Kansas recruits at the 2015 McDonald's All-American Boys Game

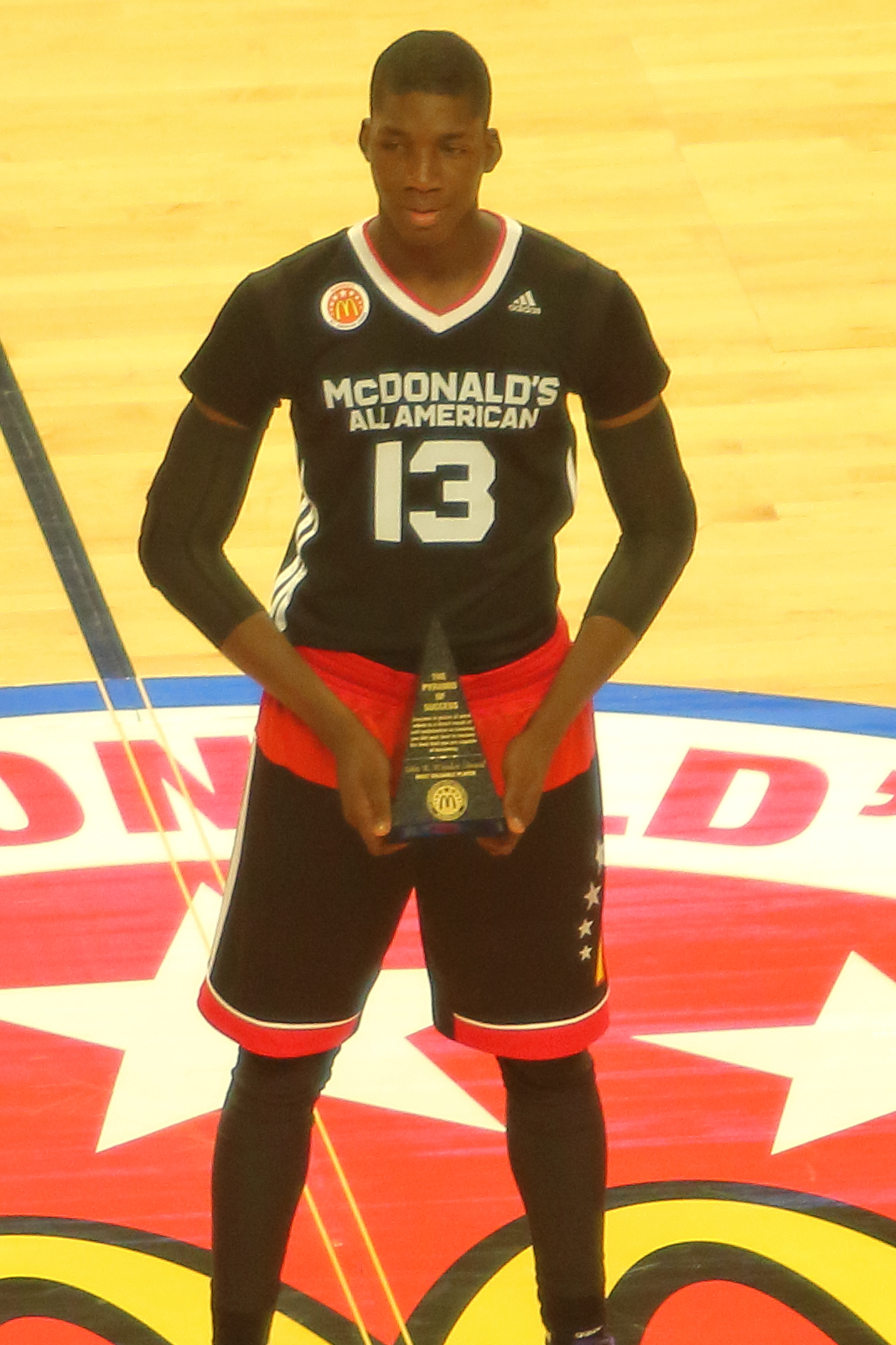
Cheick Diallo

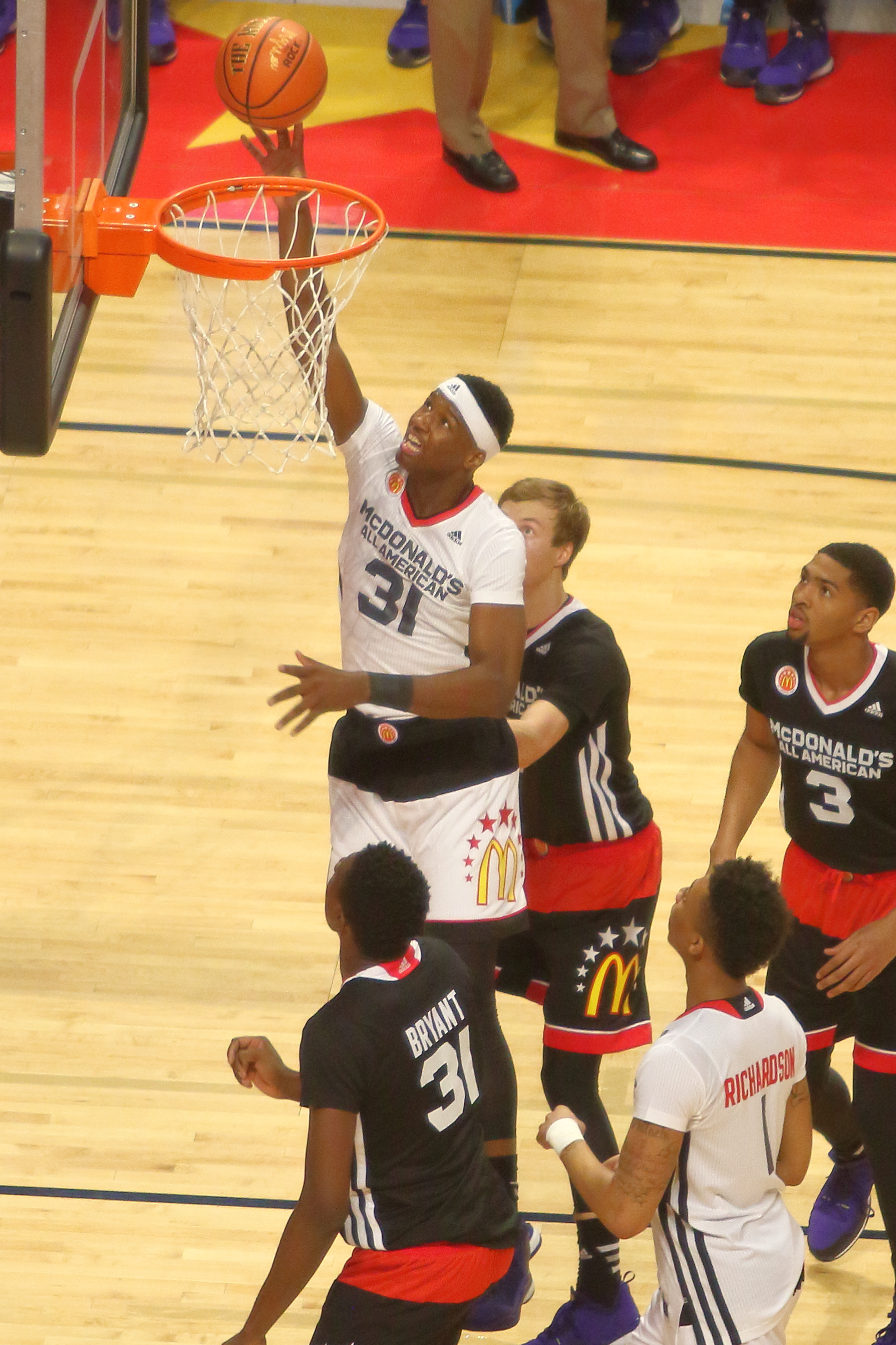
Carlton Bragg Jr.

College recruiting
Name	Hometown	School	Height	Weight	Commit date
LaGerald Vick; SG	Memphis, TN	Douglass High School	6 ft 5 in (1.96 m)	170 lb (77 kg)	May 13, 2015
LaGerald Vick; SG	Recruit ratings: Scout: Rivals: 247Sports: ESPN: (85)				
Carlton Bragg Jr. PF	Cleveland, OH	Villa Angela – St. Joseph High School	6 ft 9 in (2.06 m)	210 lb (95 kg)	Jan 8, 2015
Carlton Bragg Jr. PF	Recruit ratings: Scout: Rivals: 247Sports: ESPN: (89)				
Cheick Diallo; PF	Kayes, Mali	Our Savior New American	6 ft 9 in (2.06 m)	225 lb (102 kg)	Apr 28, 2015
Cheick Diallo; PF	Recruit ratings: Scout: Rivals: 247Sports: ESPN: (95)				
Overall recruiting rankings: Scout: #14 Rivals: #15 247Sports: #13 ESPN: #14

=== World University Games ===
In April 2014, the Kansas basketball team was selected by the United States International University Sports Federation (US-IUSF) to represent the United States in the 2015 World University Games. Kansas was selected as the team to represent the U.S. from the schools that expressed interest. This was the second time a college team represented the United States in the World University Games; University of Northern Iowa had finished 9th in 2007.

Current university students or recent graduates, born between Jan. 1, 1990, and Dec. 31, 1997, were eligible for the 2015 Games. Only U.S. citizens were eligible for the U.S. team; therefore Cheick Diallo, Sviatoslav Mykhailiuk, and Dwight Coleby (from Mali, Ukraine, and Bahamas respectively) were ineligible. The Kansas travel party, consisting of 12 competitors and 11 staff (23 total), left Lawrence on June 28 and lived in the athlete village throughout the Games. There were two non-Jayhawks on the U.S. roster: guards Nic Moore of SMU and Julian DeBose of Florida Gulf Coast, replacing injured Kansas guard Devonte' Graham.

Team USA won all their matches in the tournament, beating Germany 84–77 in double overtime on July 13, 2015, to win the gold medal.

== Roster ==
2015–16 Kansas Jayhawks men's basketball team
Players
Coaches

Pos.	#	Name	Height	Weight	Year	Hometown
G	0	Frank Mason III	5 ft 11 in (1.8 m)	185 lb (84 kg)	Jr	Petersburg, VA
G	1	Wayne Selden Jr.	6 ft 5 in (1.96 m)	230 lb (104 kg)	Jr	Boston, MA
G	2	LaGerald Vick	6 ft 5 in (1.96 m)	175 lb (79 kg)	Fr	Memphis, TN
G	4	Devonte' Graham	6 ft 2 in (1.88 m)	175 lb (79 kg)	So	Raleigh, NC
G	5	Evan Manning	6 ft 3 in (1.91 m)	170 lb (77 kg)	Sr	Lawrence, KS
G	10	Sviatoslav Mykhailiuk	6 ft 8 in (2.03 m)	195 lb (88 kg)	So	Cherkasy, Ukraine
G	11	Tyler Self	6 ft 2 in (1.88 m)	165 lb (75 kg)	RS Jr	Lawrence, KS
F	13	Cheick Diallo	6 ft 9 in (2.06 m)	220 lb (100 kg)	Fr	Kayes, Mali
G	14	Brannen Greene	6 ft 7 in (2.01 m)	215 lb (98 kg)	Jr	Monroe, GA
F	15	Carlton Bragg Jr.	6 ft 9 in (2.06 m)	220 lb (100 kg)	Fr	Cleveland, OH
F	21	Clay Young	6 ft 5 in (1.96 m)	205 lb (93 kg)	RS So	Lansing, KS
F	22	Dwight Coleby Jr. (redshirt)	6 ft 9 in (2.06 m)	240 lb (109 kg)	Jr	Nassau, Bahamas
F	31	Jamari Traylor	6 ft 8 in (2.03 m)	220 lb (100 kg)	RS Sr	Chicago, IL
F	33	Landen Lucas	6 ft 10 in (2.08 m)	240 lb (109 kg)	RS Jr	Portland, OR
F	34	Perry Ellis (C)	6 ft 8 in (2.03 m)	225 lb (102 kg)	Sr	Wichita, KS
F	42	Hunter Mickelson	6 ft 10 in (2.08 m)	245 lb (111 kg)	RS Sr	Jonesboro, AR

Head coach

- Bill Self (Oklahoma State)

Assistant coach(es)

- Norm Roberts (Queens)
- Kurtis Townsend (Western Kentucky)
- Jerrance Howard (Illinois)

Legend

- (C) Team captain
- (S) Suspended
- (I) Ineligible
- (W) Walk-on
- Injured
- Current redshirt

Roster
Last update: July 23, 2015

== Schedule ==
Date time, TV	Rank^{#}	Opponent^{#}	Result	Record	High points	High rebounds	High assists	Site (attendance) city, state
World University Games Exhibition
June 24, 2015*; 7:00 pm		at Team Canada	W 91–83		28 – Mason III	10 – Traylor	6 – Selden Jr.	Sprint Center (8,235); Kansas City, MO
June 26, 2015*; 7:00 pm		vs. Team Canada	W 87–76		22 – Selden Jr.	10 – Selden Jr.	11 – Mason III	Sprint Center (8,415); Kansas City, MO
July 2, 2015*; 10:00 pm		vs. Team China	W 93–56		13 – Vick	–	–	Seolwol Girls School Gymnasium; Gwangju, South Korea
World University Games
July 4, 2015*; 12:00 pm, ESPNU		vs. Team Turkey; Preliminary Round – Group D	W 66–57	1–0	19 – Selden Jr.	9 – Selden Jr.	4 – Mason III	Dongkang College Gymnasium; Gwangju, South Korea
July 5, 2015*; 8:30 pm, ESPNU		vs. Team Brazil; Preliminary Round – Group D	W 81–72	2–0	23 – Selden Jr.	8 – 3 Tied	7 – Mason III	Dongkang College Gymnasium; Gwangju, South Korea
July 7, 2015*; 2:30 pm		vs. Team Chile; Preliminary Round – Group D	W 106–41	3–0	23 – Mason III	14 – Lucas	5 – Selden Jr.	Muan Indoor Gymnasium; Gwangju, South Korea
July 8, 2015*; 12:00 pm, ESPNU		vs. Team Serbia; Preliminary Round – Group D	W 66–65	4–0	21 – Selden Jr.	9 – Ellis	6 – Moore (SMU)	Dongkang College Gymnasium; Gwangju, South Korea
July 9, 2015*; 10:00 am, ESPNU		vs. Team Switzerland; Preliminary Round – Group D	W 96–57	5–0	18 – Debose (FGCU)	7 – Vick	6 – Moore (SMU)	Muan Indoor Gymnasium; Gwangju, South Korea
July 11, 2015*; 12:00 pm, ESPNU		vs. Team Lithuania; Medal round – Quarterfinals	W 70–48	6–0	18 – Mason III	9 – Lucas	4 – Mason III	Gwangju University Gymnasium; Gwangju, South Korea
July 12, 2015*; 6:30 pm, ESPNU		vs. Team Russia; Medal round – Semifinals	W 78–68	7–0	23 – Ellis	6 – 2 Tied	4 – Mason III	Dongkang College Gymnasium; Gwangju, South Korea
July 13, 2015*; 9:00 pm, ESPNU		vs. Team Germany; Medal round – Finals	W 84–77 ^{2OT}	8–0	22 – Selden Jr.	10 – Ellis	6 – Mason III	Yeomju Gymnasium; Gwangju, South Korea
Exhibition
November 4, 2015*; 7:00 pm, Jayhawk TV/ESPN3	No. 4	Pittsburg State	W 89–66		22 – Ellis	12 – Ellis	8 – Graham	Allen Fieldhouse (16,300); Lawrence, KS
November 10, 2015*; 7:00 pm, Jayhawk TV/ESPN3	No. 4	Fort Hays State	W 95–59		16 – Ellis	9 – Bragg Jr.	6 – Mason III	Allen Fieldhouse (16,300); Lawrence, KS
Regular season
November 13, 2015*; 7:00 pm, Jayhawk TV/ESPN3	No. 4	Northern Colorado; Maui Invitational Opening Round	W 109–72	1–0	18 – Greene	7 – 2 Tied	9 – Mason III	Allen Fieldhouse (16,300); Lawrence, KS
November 17, 2015*; 9:20 pm, ESPN	No. 4	vs. No. 13 Michigan State; Champions Classic	L 73–79	1–1	21 – Ellis	6 – Lucas	6 – Graham	United Center (21,461); Chicago, IL
November 23, 2015*; 9:00 pm, ESPNU	No. 5	vs. Chaminade; Maui Invitational quarterfinals	W 123–72	2–1	18 – Tied	11 – Lucas	7 – Tied	Lahaina Civic Center (2,400); Maui, HI
November 24, 2015*; 9:00 pm, ESPN	No. 5	vs. UCLA; Maui Invitational semifinals	W 92–73	3–1	24 – Ellis	6 – Ellis	7 – Mason III	Lahaina Civic Center (2,400); Maui, HI
November 25, 2015*; 9:00 pm, ESPN	No. 5	vs. No. 19 Vanderbilt; Maui Invitational final	W 70–63	4–1	25 – Selden	8 – Ellis	3 – Mason	Lahaina Civic Center (2,400); Maui, HI
December 1, 2015*; 7:00 pm, Jayhawk TV/ESPN3	No. 4	Loyola (MD)	W 94–61	5–1	18 – Selden Jr.	6 – 5 Tied	5 – Mason III	Allen Fieldhouse (16,300); Lawrence, KS
December 5, 2015*; 2:15 pm, ESPN2	No. 4	Harvard	W 75–69	6–1	21 – Mason III	8 – Lucas	5 – Mason III	Allen Fieldhouse (16,300); Lawrence, KS
December 9, 2015*; 7:00 pm, Jayhawk TV/ESPN3	No. 2	Holy Cross	W 92–59	7–1	15 – Selden Jr.	5 – Bragg Jr.	5 – 2 Tied	Allen Fieldhouse (16,300); Lawrence, KS
December 12, 2015*; 7:00 pm, ESPN2	No. 2	vs. Oregon State; Kansas City Shootout	W 82–67	8–1	22 – Selden Jr.	9 – Ellis	6 – Mason III	Sprint Center (18,612); Kansas City, MO
December 19, 2015*; 1:00 pm, Jayhawk TV/ESPN3	No. 2	Montana	W 88–46	9–1	18 – Ellis	9 – Ellis	9 – Mason III	Allen Fieldhouse (16,300); Lawrence, KS
December 22, 2015*; 10:00 pm, CBSSN	No. 2	at San Diego State	W 70–57	10–1	20 – Ellis	6 – Traylor	3 – 3 Tied	Viejas Arena (12,414); San Diego, CA
December 29, 2015*; 8:00 pm, ESPNU	No. 2	UC Irvine	W 78–53	11–1	14 – Ellis	9 – Ellis	6 – Mason III	Allen Fieldhouse (16,300); Lawrence, KS
January 2, 2016; 3:00 pm, CBS	No. 2	No. 23 Baylor	W 102–74	12–1 (1–0)	24 – Selden Jr.	6 – 2 Tied	4 – 3 Tied	Allen Fieldhouse (16,300); Lawrence, KS
January 4, 2016; 8:00 pm, ESPN	No. 1	No. 2 Oklahoma	W 109–106 ^{3OT}	13–1 (2–0)	27 – Ellis	13 – Ellis	6 – Mason III	Allen Fieldhouse (16,300); Lawrence, KS
January 9, 2016; 8:00 pm, ESPNU	No. 1	at Texas Tech	W 69–59	14–1 (3–0)	17 – Mason III	10 – 2 Tied	5 – Mason III	United Supermarkets Arena (14,231); Lubbock, TX
January 12, 2016; 6:00 pm, ESPN2	No. 1	at No. 11 West Virginia	L 63–74	14–2 (3–1)	21 – Ellis	7 – Ellis	3 – Tied	WVU Coliseum (12,097); Morgantown, WV
January 16, 2016; 1:00 pm, ESPN	No. 1	TCU	W 70–63	15–2 (4–1)	11 – Selden Jr.	9 – 2 Tied	6 – Graham	Allen Fieldhouse (16,300); Lawrence, KS
January 19, 2016; 6:00 pm, ESPN2	No. 3	at Oklahoma State	L 67–86	15–3 (4–2)	14 – Mason III	5 – 2 Tied	5 – Graham	Gallagher-Iba Arena (11,383); Stillwater, OK
January 23, 2016; 1:00 pm, ESPN	No. 3	Texas	W 76–67	16–3 (5–2)	26 – Ellis	10 – Lucas	6 – Graham	Allen Fieldhouse (16,300); Lawrence, KS
January 25, 2016; 8:00 pm, ESPN	No. 4	at No. 14 Iowa State	L 72–85	16–4 (5–3)	23 – Ellis	9 – Lucas	4 – Graham	Hilton Coliseum (14,384); Ames, IA
January 30, 2016*; 6:00 pm, ESPN	No. 4	No. 20 Kentucky; Big 12/SEC Challenge	W 90–84 ^{OT}	17–4	33 – Selden Jr.	9 – Ellis	5 – Graham	Allen Fieldhouse (16,300); Lawrence, KS
February 3, 2016; 8:00 pm, ESPN2	No. 7	Kansas State; Sunflower Showdown	W 77–59	18–4 (6–3)	19 – Ellis	6 – Lucas	4 – 3 Tied	Allen Fieldhouse (16,300); Lawrence, KS
February 6, 2016; 11:00 am, ESPN	No. 7	at TCU	W 75–56	19–4 (7–3)	23 – Ellis	10 – Ellis	6 – Mason III	Schollmaier Arena (6,516); Fort Worth, TX
February 9, 2016; 6:00 pm, ESPN2	No. 6	No. 10 West Virginia	W 75–65	20–4 (8–3)	21 – Ellis	16 – Lucas	4 – Graham	Allen Fieldhouse (16,300); Lawrence, KS
February 13, 2016; 1:30 pm, ESPN	No. 6	at No. 3 Oklahoma	W 76–72	21–4 (9–3)	27 – Graham	10 – Lucas	3 – Mason III	Lloyd Noble Center (12,247); Norman, OK
February 15, 2016; 8:00 pm, ESPN	No. 2	Oklahoma State	W 94–67	22–4 (10–3)	18 – Selden Jr.	10 – Lucas	6 – Mason III	Allen Fieldhouse (16,300); Lawrence, KS
February 20, 2016; 5:00 pm, ESPN2	No. 2	at Kansas State; Sunflower Showdown	W 72–63	23–4 (11–3)	16 – Mason III	8 – Lucas	5 – Mason III	Bramlage Coliseum (12,528); Manhattan, KS
February 23, 2016; 7:00 pm, ESPN2	No. 2	at No. 19 Baylor	W 66–60	24–4 (12–3)	19 – Mason III	10 – Lucas	7 – Graham	Ferrell Center (8,259); Waco, TX
February 27, 2016; 11:00 am, ESPN	No. 2	Texas Tech	W 67–58	25–4 (13–3)	17 – Mykhailiuk	8 – Lucas	4 – Graham	Allen Fieldhouse (16,300); Lawrence, KS
February 29, 2016; 8:00 pm, ESPN	No. 1	at No. 23 Texas	W 86–56	26–4 (14–3)	20 – Ellis	8 – Lucas	6 – Mason III	Frank Erwin Center (16,540); Austin, TX
March 5, 2016; 3:00 pm, ESPN	No. 1	No. 21 Iowa State	W 85–78	27–4 (15–3)	22 – Ellis	7 – 2 tied	5 – Mason III	Allen Fieldhouse (16,300); Lawrence, KS
Big 12 Tournament
March 10, 2016; 1:30 pm, ESPN2	(1) No. 1	vs. (8) Kansas State; Quarterfinals	W 85–63	28–4	21 – Ellis	6 – Ellis	8 – Graham	Sprint Center (18,972); Kansas City, MO
March 11, 2016; 6:00 pm, ESPN2	(1) No. 1	vs. (5) No. 22 Baylor; Semifinals	W 70–66	29–4	20 – Ellis	7 – 2 tied	8 – Graham	Sprint Center (18,972); Kansas City, MO
March 12, 2016; 5:00 pm, ESPN	(1) No. 1	vs. (2) No. 9 West Virginia; Championship	W 81–71	30–4	27 – Graham	7 – Lucas	7 – Mason III	Sprint Center (19,046); Kansas City, MO
NCAA tournament
March 17, 2016*; 3:00 pm, TNT	(1 S) No. 1	vs. (16 S) Austin Peay; First Round	W 105–79	31–4	23 – Mykhailiuk	9 – Traylor	6 – Graham	Wells Fargo Arena (16,628); Des Moines, IA
March 19, 2016*; 6:45 pm, CBS	(1 S) No. 1	vs. (9 S) UConn; Second Round	W 73–61	32–4	22 – Selden Jr.	11 – Lucas	4 – 2 Tied	Wells Fargo Arena (16,824); Des Moines, IA
March 24, 2016*; 8:40 pm, CBS	(1 S) No. 1	vs. (5 S) No. 18 Maryland; Sweet Sixteen	W 79–63	33–4	27 – Ellis	11 – Lucas	6 – Selden, Jr.	KFC Yum! Center (19,399); Louisville, KY
March 26, 2016*; 7:49 pm, CBS	(1 S) No. 1	vs. (2 S) No. 6 Villanova; Elite Eight	L 59–64	33–5	17 – Graham	12 – Lucas	4 – Mason III	KFC Yum! Center (19,422); Louisville, KY
*Non-conference game. ^{#}Rankings from AP Poll. (#) Tournament seedings in parentheses. S=South. All times are in Central Time.

== Rankings ==
Ranking movements Legend: ██ Increase in ranking ██ Decrease in ranking
	Week																			
Poll	Pre	2	3	4	5	6	7	8	9	10	11	12	13	14	15	16	17	18	19	Final
AP	5	4	5	4	2	2	2	2	1	1	3	4	7	6	2	2	1	1	1	N/A*
Coaches	5	5	7	6	7	5	3	3	2	1	3	3	6	6	2	2	1	1	1	3

*AP does not release post-tournament rankings
