= Basketball at the 2015 Summer Universiade – Men's tournament =

Men's basketball at the XXVIII Summer Universiade
- Venue: various
- Dates: July 4, 2015 – July 13, 2015
- Teams: 23

Medalists
1st place, gold medalist(s)		United States (USA)
2nd place, silver medalist(s)		Germany (GER)
3rd place, bronze medalist(s)		Russia (RUS)

The men's tournament of basketball at the 2015 Summer Universiade in Gwangju began on July 4 and ended on July 13.

== Teams ==
Africa	Americas	Asia	Europe	Oceania
Mozambique	Brazil; Canada; Chile; Mexico; United States	South Korea; China; Japan; Mongolia; Chinese Taipei	Estonia; Finland; France; Germany; Lithuania; Montenegro; Russia; Serbia; Sweden; Switzerland; Turkey	Australia

Note

- The United States was represented by the University of Kansas.

== Preliminary round ==
Qualified for the Final eight
Qualified for the 9th-16th place classification playoffs
Qualified for the 17th-23rd Classification playoffs

=== Group A ===
Team	Pld	W	L	PF	PA	PD	Pts
Germany	4	4	0	327	199	+128	8
Estonia	4	3	1	271	243	+28	7
South Korea	4	2	2	301	271	+30	6
China	4	1	3	264	294	−30	5
Mozambique	4	0	4	209	365	−156	4

4 July 2015
20:00

Report

Germany	91–64	China
Scoring by quarter: 24–24, 25–11, 14–17, 28–12

Dongkang College Gymnasium

5 July 2015
15:00

Report

China	74–56	Mozambique
Scoring by quarter: 16–14, 22–13, 21–16, 15–13

Dongkang College Gymnasium

5 July 2015
18:00

Report

Estonia	40–70	Germany
Scoring by quarter: 13–14, 10–19, 12–13, 5–24

Dongkang College Gymnasium

6 July 2015
12:00

[http:// Report]

Mozambique	47–87	Estonia
Scoring by quarter: 10–29, 16–23, 7–17, 14–18

Dongkang College Gymnasium

6 July 2015
20:00

[http:// Report]

South Korea	76–62	China
Scoring by quarter: 22–9, 13–23, 19–15, 22–15

Dongkang College Gymnasium

7 July 2015
20:00

[http:// Report]

South Korea	105–69	Mozambique
Scoring by quarter: 25–16, 29–18, 24–21, 27–14

Yeonggwang Sportium Gymnasium

8 July 2015
14:30

[http:// Report]

Estonia	71–64	China
Scoring by quarter: 22–16, 22–15, 17–15, 10–18

Gwangju University Gymnasium

8 July 2015
17:30

[http:// Report]

Germany	67–58	South Korea
Scoring by quarter: 12–14, 18–11, 12–17, 25–16

Gwangju University Gymnasium

9 July 2015
15:00

[http:// Report]

Germany	99–37	Mozambique
Scoring by quarter: 21–9, 31–8, 22–4, 25–16

Muan Indoor Gymnasium

9 July 2015
20:30

[http:// Report]

South Korea	62–73	Estonia
Scoring by quarter: 18–24, 19–21, 18–8, 7–20

Gwangju University Gymnasium

=== Group B ===
Team	Pld	W	L	PF	PA	PD	Pts
Russia	5	5	0	396	286	+110	10
Canada	5	4	1	392	294	+98	9
Sweden	5	3	2	334	327	+7	8
Montenegro	5	2	3	351	301	+50	7
Mexico	5	1	4	344	397	−53	6
Mongolia	5	0	5	253	465	−212	5

4 July 2015
14:30

[http:// Report]

Mexico	90–71	Mongolia
Scoring by quarter: 17–8, 28–20, 28–24, 17–19

Yeonggwang Sportium Gymnasium

4 July 2015
14:30

[http:// Report]

Canada	78–61	Sweden
Scoring by quarter: 19–16, 24–17, 18–13, 17–15

Muan Indoor Gymnasium

4 July 2015
14:30

[http:// Report]

Russia	63–62	Montenegro
Scoring by quarter: 12–9, 17–18, 15–16, 19–19

Dongkang College Gymnasium

5 July 2015
10:00

[http:// Report]

Sweden	62–79	Russia
Scoring by quarter: 22–21, 19–11, 14–23, 24–7

Muan Indoor Gymnasium

5 July 2015
12:30

[http:// Report]

Canada	81–61	Mexico
Scoring by quarter: 21–14, 13–9, 19–16, 28–22

Gwangju University Gymnasium

5 July 2015
20:30

[http:// Report]

Mongolia	54–98	Montenegro
Scoring by quarter: 16–24, 26–10, 23–15, 25–13

Gwangju University Gymnasium

6 July 2015
14:30

[http:// Report]

Sweden	83–63	Mexico
Scoring by quarter: 23–16, 20–8, 15–21, 25–18

Yeonggwang Sportium Gymnasium

6 July 2015
14:30

[http:// Report]

Russia	99–33	Mongolia
Scoring by quarter: 25–7, 18–4, 28–13, 28–9

Gwangju University Gymnasium

6 July 2015
17:30

[http:// Report]

Montenegro	63–66	Canada
Scoring by quarter: 15–22, 11–18, 13–13, 20–17

Muan Indoor Gymnasium

8 July 2015
12:00

[http:// Report]

Montenegro	53–56	Sweden
Scoring by quarter: 8–22, 13–10, 19–17, 13–7

Gwangju University Gymnasium

8 July 2015
17:30

[http:// Report]

Canada	106–41	Mongolia
Scoring by quarter: 26–13, 27–14, 24–8, 29–6

Yeonggwang Sportium Gymnasium

8 July 2015
20:00

[http:// Report]

Mexico	68–87	Russia
Scoring by quarter: 6–29, 19–22, 18–19, 25–17

Dongkang College Gymnasium

9 July 2015
12:30

[http:// Report]

Mongolia	54–72	Sweden
Scoring by quarter: 13-19, 16-16, 15-18, 10-19

Muan Indoor Gymnasium

9 July 2015
15:00

[http:// Report]

Russia	68–61	Canada
Scoring by quarter: 9-14, 19-9, 22-16, 18-22

Dongkang College Gymnasium

9 July 2015
20:30

[http:// Report]

Mexico	62–75	Montenegro
Scoring by quarter: 17-11, 12-25, 24-17, 9-22

Muan Indoor Gymnasium

=== Group C ===
Team	Pld	W	L	PF	PA	PD	Pts
France	5	5	0	394	259	+135	10
Lithuania	5	4	1	433	346	+87	9
Australia	5	3	2	360	319	+41	8
Finland	5	2	3	345	388	−43	7
Japan	5	1	4	330	357	−27	6
Chinese Taipei	5	0	5	239	432	−193	5

4 July 2015
12:00

[http:// Report]

Australia	93–47	Chinese Taipei
Scoring by quarter: 18–9, 22–12, 27–11, 26–15

Gwangju University Gymnasium

4 July 2015
14:30

[http:// Report]

Finland	73–72	Japan
Scoring by quarter: 20–11, 16–18, 22–17, 15–26

Gwangju University Gymnasium

4 July 2015
17:30

[http:// Report]

Lithuania	89–96 (OT)	France
Scoring by quarter: 21–19, 21–17, 19–26, 20–19, Overtime: 8–15

Gwangju University Gymnasium

5 July 2015
12:30

[http:// Report]

Lithuania	87–70	Finland
Scoring by quarter: 23–16, 18–16, 24–18, 22–20

Muan Indoor Gymnasium

5 July 2015
13:00

[http:// Report]

Japan	78–61	Chinese Taipei
Scoring by quarter: 15–6, 22–20, 19–15, 22–20

Dongkang College Gymnasium

5 July 2015
15:00

[http:// Report]

France	71–45	Australia
Scoring by quarter: 17–12, 16–14, 21–6, 17–13

Muan Indoor Gymnasium

7 July 2015
12:00

[http:// Report]

Chinese Taipei	37–93	Lithuania
Scoring by quarter: 11–21, 5–22, 9–29, 12–21

Dongkang College Gymnasium

7 July 2015
12:00

[http:// Report]

Australia	73–58	Japan
Scoring by quarter: 15–12, 18–22, 24–18, 16–6

Gwangju University Gymnasium

7 July 2015
14:30

[http:// Report]

France	85–47	Finland
Scoring by quarter: 13–18, 23–6, 26–16, 23–7

Dongkang College Gymnasium

8 July 2015
14:30

[http:// Report]

Finland	69–82	Australia
Scoring by quarter: 13–25, 14–19, 20–19, 22–19

Muan Indoor Gymnasium

8 July 2015
17:30

[http:// Report]

Lithuania	90–76	Japan
Scoring by quarter: 24–19, 21–18, 21–20, 24–19

Muan Indoor Gymnasium

8 July 2015
20:30

Report

Chinese Taipei	32–82	France
Scoring by quarter: 11–17, 11–26, 7–17, 3–22

Miras Sports Complex

9 July 2015
12:30

[http:// Report]

Japan	46–60	France
Scoring by quarter: 9–16, 16–13, 12–12, 9–19

Gwangju University Gymnasium

9 July 2015
12:30

[http:// Report]

Australia	67–74	Lithuania
Scoring by quarter: 18–22, 15–15, 15–16, 19–21

Dongkang College Gymnasium

9 July 2015
15:00

[http:// Report]

Finland	86–62	Chinese Taipei
Scoring by quarter: 24–17, 18–15, 21–17, 23–13

Gwangju University Gymnasium

=== Group D ===
Team	Pld	W	L	PF	PA	PD	Pts
United States	5	5	0	415	292	+123	10
Brazil	5	4	1	381	295	+86	9
Serbia	5	3	2	318	263	+55	8
Turkey	5	2	3	300	295	+5	7
Switzerland	5	1	4	273	370	−97	6
Chile	5	0	5	211	383	−172	5

4 July 2015
12:00

[http:// Report]

United States	66–57	Turkey
Scoring by quarter: 12–21, 20–15, 22–11, 12–10

Dongkang College Gymnasium

4 July 2015
17:30

[http:// Report]

Brazil	78–33	Chile
Scoring by quarter: 20–4, 18–11, 19–6, 21–12

Yeonggwang Sportium Gymnasium

4 July 2015
20:00

[http:// Report]

Serbia	58–41	Switzerland
Scoring by quarter: 11–4, 13–14, 18–11, 16–12

Gwangju University Gymnasium

5 July 2015
18:00

[http:// Report]

Turkey	68–61	Switzerland
Scoring by quarter: 17–14, 14–16, 20–12, 17–19

Gwangju University Gymnasium

5 July 2015
18:00

[http:// Report]

Chile	43–69	Serbia
Scoring by quarter: 14–21, 12–14, 15–14, 2–20

Muan Indoor Gymnasium

5 July 2015
20:30

[http:// Report]

Brazil	72–81	United States
Scoring by quarter: 13–12, 15–28, 16–19, 28–22

Dongkang College Gymnasium

7 July 2015
12:00

[http:// Report]

Switzerland	57–100	Brazil
Scoring by quarter: 6–32, 22–22, 16–23, 13–23

Yeonggwang Sportium Gymnasium

7 July 2015
14:30

[http:// Report]

Chile	41–106	United States
Scoring by quarter: 11–22, 8–25, 12–33, 10–26

Muan Indoor Gymnasium

7 July 2015
14:30

[http:// Report]

Serbia	61–43	Turkey
Scoring by quarter: 16–3, 24–11, 5–9, 16–20

Gwangju University Gymnasium

8 July 2015
12:00

[http:// Report]

United States	66–65	Serbia
Scoring by quarter: 14–13, 12–11, 14–13, 26–28

Dongkang College Gymnasium

8 July 2015
14:30

[http:// Report]

Switzerland	57–48	Chile
Scoring by quarter: 17–8, 7–12, 11–12, 22–16

Dongkang College Gymnasium

8 July 2015
17:30

Report

Brazil	61–59	Turkey
Scoring by quarter: 21–10, 7–12, 23–21, 10–16

Dongkang College Gymnasium

9 July 2015
10:00

[http:// Report]

United States	96–57	Switzerland
Scoring by quarter: 25–14, 26–19, 30–13, 15–11

Dongkang College Gymnasium

9 July 2015
18:00

[http:// Report]

Serbia	65–70	Brazil
Scoring by quarter: 18–18, 14–2, 13–16, 20–34

Muan Indoor Gymnasium

9 July 2015
18:00

[http:// Report]

Turkey	73–46	Chile
Scoring by quarter: 24–14, 16–10, 13–13, 20–9

Gwangju University Gymnasium

== Classification rounds ==
=== Quarterfinal round ===
==== 17th–24th place ====
10 July 2015
20:00

[http:// Report]

Mozambique	58–62	Mongolia
Scoring by quarter: 11-25, 12-14, 22-13, 13-10

Dongkang College Gymnasium

11 July 2015
14:30

[http:// Report]

Japan	62–65	Chile
Scoring by quarter: 10-16, 26-22, 15-17, 11-10

Yeonggwang Sportium Gymnasium

11 July 2015
17:30

Switzerland	71–66	Chinese Taipei
Scoring by quarter: 18-10, 19-15, 21-19, 13-22

Yeonggwang Sportium Gymnasium

==== 9th–16th place ====
11 July 2015
14:30

Report

Australia	73–67	Turkey
Scoring by quarter: 12-12, 23-7, 21-29, 17-19

Muan Indoor Gymnasium

11 July 2015
17:30

Report

South Korea	70–68	Montenegro
Scoring by quarter: 14-14, 19-23, 23-13, 14-18

Gwangju University Gymnasium

11 July 2015
17:30

Report

Serbia	78–65	Finland
Scoring by quarter: 14-16, 20-12, 22-22, 22-15

Muan Indoor Gymnasium

11 July 2015
20:00

Report

Sweden	69–53	China
Scoring by quarter: 18-16, 12-17, 20-10, 19-10

Gwangju University Gymnasium

=== Semifinal round ===
==== 21st–24th place ====
12 July 2015
12:30

Mozambique	46–107	Japan
Scoring by quarter: 27-8, 16-16, 37-12, 27-10

Dongkang College Gymnasium

==== 17th–20th place ====
12 July 2015
18:00

Report

Mexico	50–82	Switzerland
Scoring by quarter: 10-25, 9-19, 20-18, 11-20

Yeonggwang Sportium Gymnasium

12 July 2015
20:30

Report

Mongolia	72–54	Chile
Scoring by quarter: 14-13, 15-11, 17-6, 26-24

Muan Indoor Gymnasium

==== 13th–16th place ====
12 July 2015
18:00

Montenegro	68–49	Turkey
Scoring by quarter: 21-12, 13-16, 14-10, 20-11

Gwangju University Gymnasium

12 July 2015
20:30

Report

China	53–89	Finland
Scoring by quarter: 9-24, 12-21, 22-24, 10-20

Muan Indoor Gymnasium

==== 9th–12th place ====
12 July 2015
15:00

Report

Sweden	62–75	Serbia
Scoring by quarter: 16-18, 10-17, 17-18, 19-22

Yeonggwang Sportium Gymnasium

12 July 2015
18:00

South Korea	64–92	Australia
Scoring by quarter: 14-23, 13-23, 20-28, 17-18

Gwangju University Gymnasium

==== 5th–8th place ====
12 July 2015
12:30

Report

Canada	46–64	France
Scoring by quarter: 13–11, 10–20, 14–11, 9–22

Gwangju University Gymnasium

12 July 2015
18:00

Report

Estonia	67–80	Lithuania
Scoring by quarter: 17–14, 11–26, 13–21, 26–19

Muan Indoor Gymnasium

=== Final round ===
==== 21st place game ====
13 July 2015
10:00

Report

Japan	67–61	Chinese Taipei
Scoring by quarter: 19–13, 16–11, 15–19, 17–18

Yeonggwang Sportium Gymnasium

==== 19th-place game ====
13 July 2015
10:00

Report

Chile	79–65	Mexico
Scoring by quarter: 15–24, 15–22, 17–17, 18–16

Muan Indoor Gymnasium

==== 17th-place game ====
13 July 2015
10:00

Report

Mongolia	76–71	Switzerland
Scoring by quarter: 14–17, 19–24, 24–11, 19–19

Gwangju University Gymnasium

==== 15th-place game ====
13 July 2015
12:30

Report

Turkey	83–78	China
Scoring by quarter: 28–15, 13–21, 25–17, 17–25

Muan Indoor Gymnasium

==== 13th-place game ====
13 July 2015
12:30

Report

Montenegro	74–57	Finland
Scoring by quarter: 28–14, 13–15, 18–15, 15–13

Gwangju University Gymnasium

==== 11th-place game ====
13 July 2015
15:00

Report

South Korea	84–75	Sweden
Scoring by quarter: 23–16, 12–20, 25–22, 24–17

Muan Indoor Gymnasium

==== 9th-place game ====
13 July 2015
12:30

Report

Australia	72–81	Serbia
Scoring by quarter: 14–15, 18–19, 20–25, 20–22

Yeonggwang Sportium Gymnasium

==== 7th-place game ====
13 July 2015
10:00

Report

Canada	91–65	Estonia
Scoring by quarter: 20–21, 16–8, 26–18, 29–18

Dongkang College Gymnasium

==== 5th-place game ====
13 July 2015
12:30

Report

France	69–58	Lithuania
Scoring by quarter: 15–12, 23–13, 11–20, 20–13

Dongkang College Gymnasium

== Championship playoffs ==
Quarterfinals
A1	Germany	79
B2	Canada	73
C1	France	53
D2	Brazil	60
B1	Russia	86
A2	Estonia	65
D1	United States	70
C2	Lithuania	48

Semifinals
A1	Germany	59
D2	Brazil	49
B1	Russia	68
D1	United States	78

Gold-medal game
A1	Germany	77
D1	' United States	84
Bronze-medal game
D2	Brazil	72
B1	Russia	80

=== Quarterfinals ===
11 July 2015
12:00

[http:// Report]

Germany	79–73	Canada
Scoring by quarter: 16-16, 16-13, 18-19, 29-25

Gwangju University Gymnasium

11 July 2015
12:00

[http:// Report]

United States	70–48	Lithuania
Scoring by quarter: 23-18, 14-12, 8-12, 25-6

Dongkang College Gymnasium

11 July 2015
14:30

[http:// Report]

France	53–60	Brazil
Scoring by quarter: 12-17, 17-11, 9-18, 15-14

Gwangju University Gymnasium

11 July 2015
14:30

[http:// Report]

Russia	86–65	Estonia
Scoring by quarter: 25-15, 19-11, 17-12, 25-27

Dongkang College Gymnasium

=== Semifinals ===
12 July 2015
15:00

Report

Germany	59–49	Brazil
Scoring by quarter: 12–12, 12–11, 16–15, 19–11

Dongkang College Gymnasium

12 July 2015
18:30

Report

Russia	68–78	United States
Scoring by quarter: 18–14, 21–28, 17–19, 12–17

Dongkang College Gymnasium

=== Bronze-medal game ===
13 July 2015
12:30

Report

Brazil	72–80	Russia
Scoring by quarter: 14-19, 15-12, 22-24, 21-25
Pts: Coelho 26; Rebs: Coelho 8 Asts: Torres 5		Pts: Antipov 22; Rebs: Ilnitskiy 9 Asts: Strebkov 4

Dongkang College Gymnasium
Referees: Matthew Myers (USA), Nicolas MAESTRE (FRA), Markos MICHAELIDES (SUI)

=== Gold-medal game ===
13 July 2015
21:00

Report

Germany	77–84 (OT)	United States
Scoring by quarter: 13-20, 20-18, 21-16, 12-12, Overtime: 7-7,4-11
Pts: Lo 16; Rebs: Lo 8 Asts: Lo 5		Pts: Selden 22; Rebs: Ellis 10; Asts: Mason 6

Yeomju Gymnasium
Referees: Roberto Chiari (ITA), Milija VOJINOVIC (SRB), Scott Beker (AUS)

== Final standings ==
Place	Team	Score
1st place, gold medalist(s)	United States	8–0
2nd place, silver medalist(s)	Germany	7–1
3rd place, bronze medalist(s)	Russia	7–1
4	Brazil	5–3
5	France	7–1
6	Lithuania	5–3
7	Canada	5–3
8	Estonia	3–4
9	Serbia	6–2
10	Australia	5–3
11	South Korea	4–3
12	Sweden	4–4
13	Montenegro	4–4
14	Finland	3–5
15	Turkey	3–5
16	China	1–6
17	Mongolia	3–5
18	Switzerland	3–5
19	Chile	2–6
20	Mexico	1–6
21	Japan	3–5
22	Chinese Taipei	0–7
23	Mozambique	0–6
