= Jean Emery =

Swiss basketball player

Personal information
- Nationality: Swiss

Sport
- Sport: Basketball

Jean Emery was a Swiss basketball player. He competed for the Switzerland men's national basketball team during the EuroBasket 1953 tournament.
