= Lance Jeter =

American basketball player

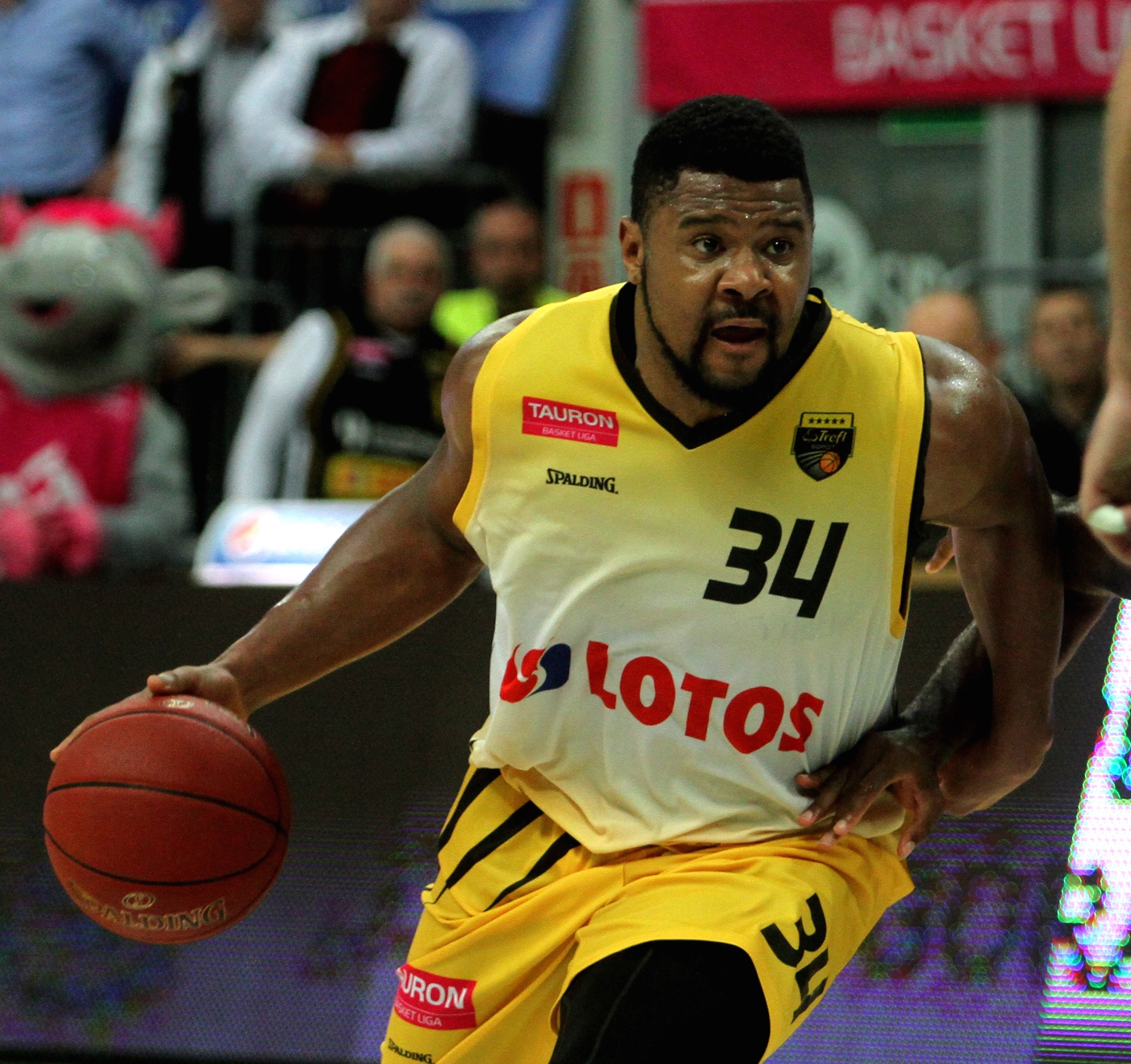
- Jeter playing with Trefl Sopot in 2014

Personal information
- Born: July 18, 1988 (age 37) Beaver Falls, Pennsylvania, U.S.
- Listed height: 6 ft 3 in (1.91 m)
- Listed weight: 242 lb (110 kg)

Career information
- High school: Beaver Falls (Beaver Falls, Pennsylvania)
- College: Polk State (2007–2009); Nebraska (2009–2011)
- NBA draft: 2011: undrafted
- Playing career: 2011–2019
- Position: Point guard

Career history
- 2011–2012: Aris Leeuwarden
- 2012: AZS Koszalin
- 2012–2013: ratiopharm Ulm
- 2013–2014: Trefl Sopot
- 2014–2015: Donar
- 2015–2016: Mitteldeutscher
- 2016–2017: Donar
- 2017–2018: JL Bourg
- 2018: Pieno žvaigždės
- 2018–2019: Donar

Career highlights
- 2× DBL Most Valuable Player (2015, 2017); DBL Playoffs MVP (2016); 2× DBL champion (2016, 2017); 2× Dutch Cup champion (2015, 2017); Dutch Supercup champion (2016); 2× DBL assists leader (2015, 2017); 3× DBL All-First Team (2015–2017); 3× DBL All-Star (2012, 2015, 2017); Polish Supercup champion (2013)

Lance Lamar Jeter (born July 18, 1988) is an American former professional basketball player. He played at the point guard and occasionally shooting guard positions. Jeter played college basketball for the Nebraska Cornhuskers at the University of Nebraska–Lincoln. Nicknamed "the General", he is a two-time winner of the Dutch Basketball League MVP Award during his time with Donar.

== Professional career ==
=== Aris Leeuwarden ===
His first professional season, Jeter played for Aris Leeuwarden. He was the main scorer player of Aris, as he averaged 16.9 points per game. He was chosen to the DBL All-Star team.

=== Koszalin and Ulm ===
In 2012, he signed a contract with the Polish club AZS Koszalin but he was released quickly. He played the 2012–13 season for ratiopharm ulm, whom he competed with in the Eurocup along with the Bundesliga.

=== Trefl Sopot ===
In the 2013–14 season he returned to Poland to play for Trefl Sopot. Jeter started the season with Trefl, by winning the Polish Supercup. The team eventually took the third place in the 2013–14 PLK season.

=== Donar ===
For the 2014–15 season he signed with Dutch team Donar. With Donar, he won the NBB Cup, after the team beat SPM Shoeters in the Final. He won the Dutch Basketball League MVP Award in April. Donar's season ended after the Finals, in which the team lost 4–1 to SPM Shoeters.

=== Mitteldeutscher BC ===
On September 17, 2015, returned to the Bundesliga after Mitteldeutscher BC announced an agreement with Jeter. He left the team on January 3, 2016, after Mitteldeutscher BC honored his request to dissolve his contract. Jeter averaged 8.1 points in 17 games for the team.

=== Second stint with Donar ===
On January 13, 2016, he returned to Donar. On December 16, 2016, he scored a career-high 31 points in a DBL road loss to Aris Leeuwarden. Jeter was named to the All-DBL Team for the second time.

After a season in which Donar won the DBL championship, Jeter re-signed for another year. Jeter won his second DBL Most Valuable Player Award this season and became the seventh player to have won multiple Dutch League MVP awards.

=== JL Bourg ===
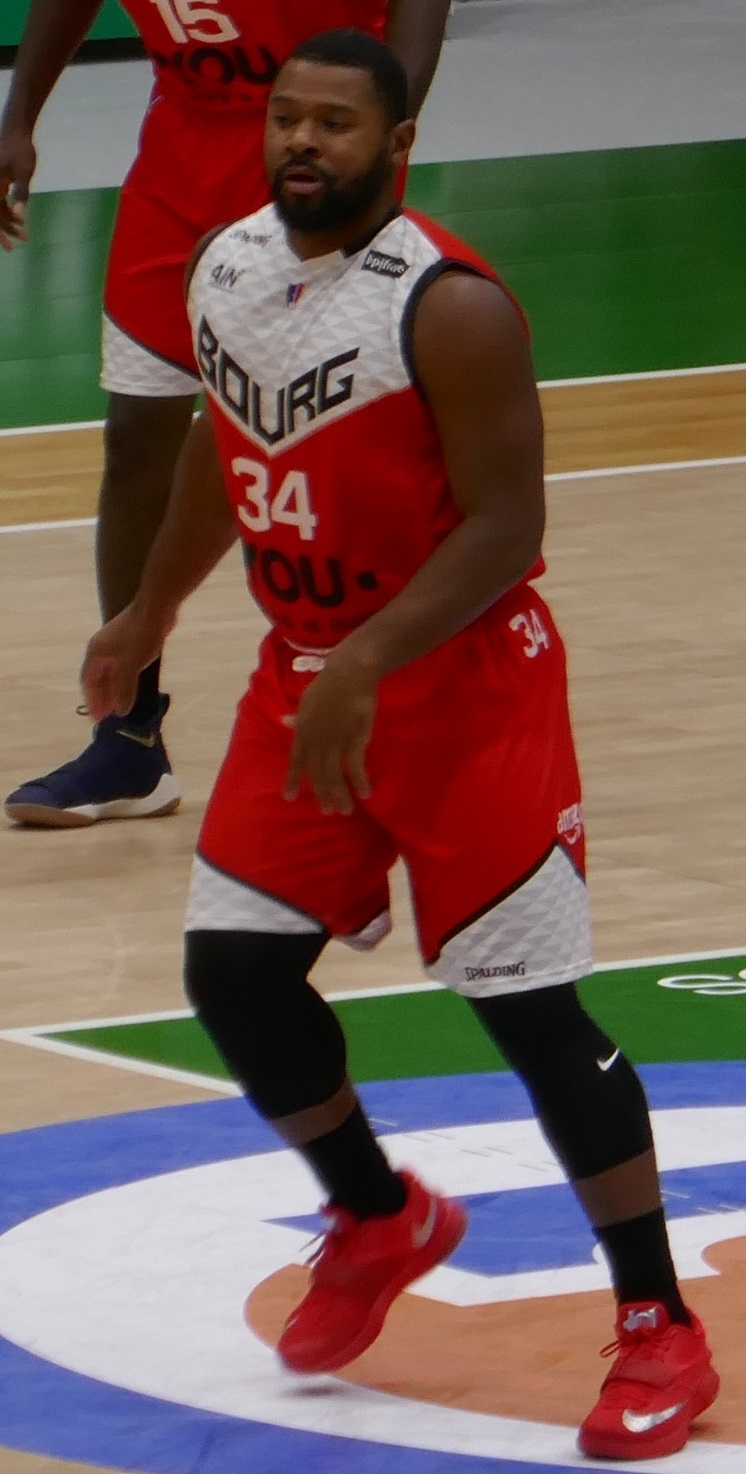
Jeter with JL Bourg in 2017

For the 2017–18 season, Jeter signed with JL Bourg of the French LNB Pro A.

=== Lithuania ===
The 2018–19 season, Jeter started with BC Pieno žvaigždės. On November 12, 2018, Jeter was released by Pieno. He averaged 7.3 points and 3.0 assists in the Lithuanian Basketball League.

=== Return to Donar ===
On November 25, 2018, he returned to Donar.

== Honors ==
=== Club ===
Donar

- Dutch Basketball League (2): 2015–16, 2016–17
- NBB Cup (2): 2014–15, 2016–17
- Dutch Basketball Supercup (1): 2016

Trefl Sopot

- Polish Supercup (1): 2013

=== Individual awards ===
- DBL Most Valuable Player (2): 2014–15, 2016–17
- DBL Play-offs MVP (1): 2015–16
- DBL All-First Team (3): 2014–15, 2015–16, 2017
- DBL All-Star (3): 2012, 2015, 2017

== Statistics ==
Season	Team	League	PPG	RPG	APG	EFF
2011–12	Aris Leeuwarden	DBL	16.9	3.8	3.5	16.0
2012–13	Ratiopharm Ulm	Bundesliga	8.3	2.0	2.9	7.3
2013–14	Trefl Sopot	PLK	9.2	3.2	2.6	8.9
2014–15	Donar	DBL	15.8	4.2	5.0	19.2
2015–16	Mitteldeutscher BC	Bundesliga	8.1	2.1	3.1	8.3
2015–16	Donar	DBL	15.5	4.4	5.9	18.9
2016–17	Donar	DBL	13.0	3.2	6.2	16.6
2017–18	JL Bourg	LNB Pro A	6.3	2.3	3.4	7.5
2018–19	Pieno Zvaigzdes	LKL	8.3	1.9	3.3	9.9
2018–19	Donar	DBL	9.2	2.3	3.4	10.4

League leader

== Personal ==
He and his wife Stephanie have three children: Nico, Lance Jr., and Camila.
