= Marcos Bossy =

Swiss basketball player (1920–1983)

Personal information
- Nationality: Swiss
- Born: 18 April 1920
- Died: 17 January 1983 (aged 62) Geneva, Switzerland

Sport
- Sport: Basketball

Marcos Bossy (18 April 1920 – 17 January 1983) was a Swiss basketball player. He competed in the men's tournament at the 1948 Summer Olympics and the 1952 Summer Olympics. Bossy died in Geneva on 17 January 1983, at the age of 62.
