= Jean-Pierre Voisin =

Swiss basketball player (1932–2014)

Personal information
- Nationality: Swiss
- Born: 13 November 1932
- Died: 19 August 2014 (aged 81)

Sport
- Sport: Basketball

Jean-Pierre Voisin (13 November 1932 – 19 August 2014) was a Swiss basketball player. He competed in the men's tournament at the 1952 Summer Olympics.
