= Jacques Redard =

Swiss basketball player

Personal information
- Nationality: Swiss
- Born: 21 November 1933 (age 91)

Sport
- Sport: Basketball

Jacques Redard (born 21 November 1933) is a Swiss basketball player. He competed in the men's tournament at the 1952 Summer Olympics.
