= René Wohler =

Swiss basketball player

Personal information
- Nationality: Swiss
- Born: 4 September 1922
- Died: January 2017

Sport
- Sport: Basketball

René Wohler (4 September 1922 – January 2017) was a Swiss basketball player. He competed in the men's tournament at the 1952 Summer Olympics.
