= Henri Baumann =

Swiss basketball player (1927–1971)

Personal information
- Nationality: Swiss
- Born: 15 August 1927
- Died: 26 January 1971 (aged 43)

Sport
- Sport: Basketball

Henri Baumann (15 August 1927 – 26 January 1971) was a Swiss basketball player. He competed in the men's tournament at the 1948 Summer Olympics and the 1952 Summer Olympics. Baumann died on 26 January 1971, at the age of 43.
