= Maurice Chollet =

Swiss basketball player (1927–2017)

Personal information
- Nationality: Swiss
- Born: 23 December 1927; Lausanne, Switzerland
- Died: 22 February 2017 (aged 89); Lausanne, Switzerland

Sport
- Sport: Basketball

Maurice Chollet (23 December 1927 – 22 February 2017) was a Swiss basketball player. He competed in the men's tournament at the 1948 Summer Olympics and the 1952 Summer Olympics.

Chollet died in Lausanne on 22 February 2017, at the age of 89.
