= Gérald Cottier =

Swiss basketball player

Personal information
- Nationality: Swiss
- Born: 22 May 1931
- Died: 20 August 1979 (aged 48)

Sport
- Sport: Basketball

Gérald Cottier (22 May 1931 – 20 August 1979) was a Swiss basketball player. He competed in the men's tournament at the 1952 Summer Olympics.
