= Henry Gujer =

Swiss basketball player

Personal information
- Nationality: Swiss
- Born: 25 April 1920
- Died: 4 November 2017 (aged 97)

Sport
- Sport: Basketball

Henry Gujer (25 April 1920 – 4 November 2017) was a Swiss basketball player. He competed in the men's tournament at the 1948 Summer Olympics.
