= René Chiappino =

Swiss basketball player (born 1925)

Personal information
- Nationality: Swiss
- Born: 18 December 1925; Geneva, Switzerland

Sport
- Sport: Basketball

René Chiappino (born 18 December 1925) was a Swiss basketball player. He competed in the men's tournament at the 1952 Summer Olympics.
