= Georges Stockly =

Swiss basketball player

Personal information
- Nationality: Swiss
- Born: 1 August 1916
- Died: 10 December 1984 (aged 68)

Sport
- Sport: Basketball

Georges Stockly (1 August 1916 – 10 December 1984) was a Swiss basketball player. He competed in the men's tournament at the 1948 Summer Olympics and the 1952 Summer Olympics.
