= Jean Pollet =

Swiss basketball player (1912–1982)

Personal information
- Full name: John Alphonse Marius Pollet
- Nationality: Swiss
- Born: 18 July 1912 Geneva, Switzerland
- Died: 27 July 1982 (aged 70) Geneva, Switzerland

Sport
- Sport: Basketball

John Alphonse Marius Pollet (18 July 1912 – 27 July 1982) was a Swiss basketball player. He competed in the men's tournaments at the 1936 Summer Olympics and the 1948 Summer Olympics. Pollet died in Geneva on 27 July 1982, at the age of 70.
