= René Karlen =

Swiss basketball player

Personal information
- Nationality: Swiss
- Born: 18 April 1907

Sport
- Sport: Basketball

René Karlen (born 18 April 1907, date of death unknown) was a Swiss basketball player. He competed in the men's tournament at the 1936 Summer Olympics.
