= Pierre Albrecht (basketball, born 1931) =

Swiss basketball player (1931–2019)

Personal information
- Nationality: Swiss
- Born: 3 July 1931
- Died: 10 October 2019 (aged 88)

Sport
- Sport: Basketball

Pierre Albrecht (3 July 1931 – 10 October 2019) was a Swiss basketball player. He competed in the men's tournament at the 1952 Summer Olympics.
