= Marcel Wuilleumier =

Swiss basketball player

Personal information
- Nationality: Swiss
- Born: 22 June 1909

Sport
- Sport: Basketball

Marcel Wuilleumier (born 22 June 1909, date of death unknown) was a Swiss basketball player. He competed in the men's tournament at the 1936 Summer Olympics, with the Swiss team finishing in ninth place.
