= Raymond Lambercy =

Swiss basketball player

Personal information
- Nationality: Swiss
- Born: 12 February 1909

Sport
- Sport: Basketball

Raymond Lambercy (born 12 February 1909, date of death unknown) was a Swiss basketball player. He competed in the men's tournament at the 1936 Summer Olympics.
