= Jean Paré (basketball) =

Swiss basketball player (1913–1986)

Personal information
- Full name: Jean Louis Paré
- Nationality: Swiss
- Born: 24 March 1913 Geneva, Switzerland
- Died: 22 November 1986 (aged 73) Sierre, Switzerland

Sport
- Sport: Basketball

Jean Louis Paré (24 March 1913 – 22 November 1986) was a Swiss basketball player. He competed in the men's tournaments at the 1936 Summer Olympics and the 1948 Summer Olympics. Paré died in Sierre on 22 November 1986, at the age of 73.
