= 2026–27 Belgian Basketball Cup =

Belgian Cup
- Season: 2026–27

The 2026–27 Belgian Basketball Cup, for sponsorship reasons the Lotto Basketball Cup, is the 73rd edition of Belgium's national basketball cup tournament. Windrose Antwerp Giants are defending champions.

== Format ==
The tournament is a single-elimination tournament in which the teams play match in the Round of 16, two in the quarter and semi-finals and one final to determine the winner of the Belgian Basketball Cup. In the round of 32, random opponents are drawn from the Top Division Men Two, Top Division Men One and the BNXT League. After that, new opponents will be drawn for the round of 16.

== Bracket ==
Round of 32
Imprenta Kontich Wolves | 98
Basics Melsele-Beveren | 93
Antwerp Giants B | 77
Kortrijk Spurs | 124
Rucon Gembo Borgerhout | 73
Ninane Promotion | 75
Phantoms Boom | 72
Partena Professional Okapi Aalst | 101
Basket Willebroek | 107
United Basket Woluwé | 81
SKT Ieper | 76
Coretec Oostende | 110
BBC Croonen Lommel | 88
Hasselt BT | 65
Flénu Frameries | 74
Windrose Antwerp Giants | 120
LDP Donza | 85
BBC Falco Gent | 80
G&V Breakpoint Waregem | 76
CityX Mons | 92
BC Guco Lier | 69
Leuven Bears | 86
Spirou Basket B | 77
CB Liège | 113
BC Sprimont | 85
Kangoeroes Mechelen | 130
CEP Fleurus | 72
Brussels Basketball | 109
Avanti Brugge 2015 | 94
Limburg United | 127
Bavi Vilvoorde | 70
Val-Dieu Spirou Basket | 101

Round of 16
Imprenta Kontich Wolves
Kortrijk Spurs
Ninane Promotion
Partena Professional Okapi Aalst
Basket Willebroek
Coretec Oostende
BBC Croonen Lommel
Windrose Antwerp Giants
LDP Donza
CityX Mons
Leuven Bears
CB Liège
Kangoeroes Mechelen
Brussels Basketball
Limburg United
Val-Dieu Spirou Basket

Quarter-finals

Semi-finals

Final
