= Belgian Basketball Cup MVP =

The Belgian Basketball Cup Most Valuable Player (MVP) is an annual award that is given to the most valuable player of the Belgian Basketball Cup, which is the top-tier national domestic men's basketball cup competition in the country of Belgium.

== Winners ==
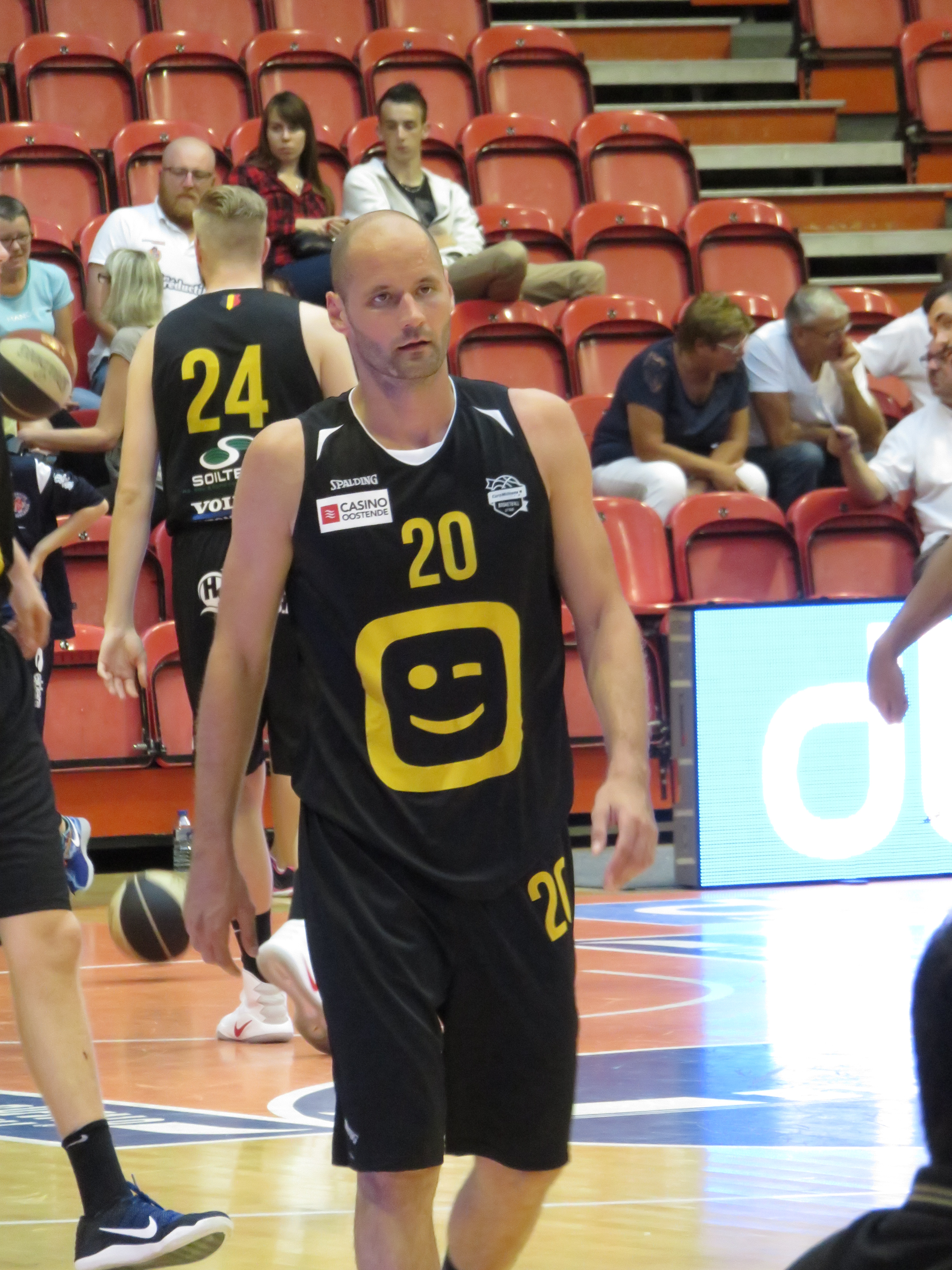
Dušan Djordjević won the award a record three times

Key
| Player (X) | Name of the player and number of times they had won the award at that point (if more than one) |
| Nationality | Nationality as registered by FIBA, player may hold more nationalities |

| Season | Player | Pos. | Nationality | Team | Ref. |
|---|---|---|---|---|---|
| 2012–13 | Matt Lojeski | Forward | Belgium | BC Oostende | |
| 2013–14 | Dušan Djordjević | Guard | Serbia | BC Oostende | |
| 2015–16 | Khalid Boukichou | Center | Belgium | BC Oostende | |
| 2016–17 | Dušan Djordjević (2) | Guard | Serbia | BC Oostende | |
| 2017–18 | Dušan Djordjević (3) | Guard | Serbia | BC Oostende | |
| 2018–19 | Ismaël Bako | Center | Belgium | Antwerp Giants | |
| 2019–20 | Luka Rupnik | Guard | Slovenia | Antwerp Giants | |
| 2020–21 | Loïc Schwartz | Guard | Belgium | BC Oostende | |
| 2021–22 | Tyrell Nelson | Center | United States | Limburg United | |
| 2022–23 | Spencer Butterfield | Guard | United States | Antwerp Giants | |
| 2023–24 | Roman Penn | Guard | United States | Limburg United | |
| 2023–24 | Osun Osunniyi | Forward | United States | Limburg United | |
| 2024–25 | Pierre-Antoine Gillet | Forward | Belgium | Antwerp Giants | |
| 2025–26 | Enoch Cheeks | Guard | United States | Antwerp Giants | |

== Awards won by nationality ==
| Country | Total |
|---|---|
| Belgium | 5 |
| United States | 5 |
| Serbia | 3 |
| Slovenia | 1 |

== Awards won by club ==
| Club | Total |
|---|---|
| Oostende | 6 |
| Antwerp Giants | 5 |
| Limburg United | 3 |
