= Jesse Waleson =

Dutch basketball player

Free Agent
- Position: Center

Personal information
- Born: 25 May 2001 (age 25) Amsterdam, Netherlands
- Listed height: 2.11 m (6 ft 11 in)
- Listed weight: 103 kg (227 lb)

Career information
- Playing career: 2020–present

Career history
- 2020–present: Oostende
- 2022: →Kangoeroes Mechelen
- 2023–2024: →Landstede Hammers

Career highlights
- PBL champion (2021); Belgian Cup champion (2021)

Jesse Waleson (born 25 May 2001) is a Dutch basketball player. Standing at 2.11 m (6 ft 11 in), he plays as center.

== Early career ==
At age 16, Waleson moved from the Netherlands to Spain to play for the UCEM Mataro U18 team. After a year, he returned to play for the Orange Lions Academy. Waleson later signed with BC Oostende to play for their U21 team.

== Professional career ==
On 13 December 2020, Waleson made his debut for Filou Oostende against Mons-Hainaut, contributing 6 points in a 72–75 loss. On 11 April 2021, he had a career-high 11 points against Phoenix Brussels. Waleson averaged 3.4 points and 2.5 rebounds per game. On February 14, 2022, he was sent on loan to Kangoeroes Mechelen of the BNXT League.

In February 2023, Waleson was sent on loan to Landstede Hammers for the remainder of the season.

== National team career ==
Waleson has played for the Netherlands U18 team.
