= 2007–08 Basketball League Belgium Division I =

Basketball League Belgium Division I
- Season: 2007–08
- Teams: 10

Regular season
- Season MVP: (United States) D'or Fischer

Finals
- Champions: Spirou Charleroi (7th title)
- Runners-up: Euphony Bree

The 2007–08 Basketball League Belgium Division I, for sponsorship reasons named 2007–08 Ethias League, was the 81st season of the Basketball League Belgium, the highest professional basketball league in Belgium. Spirou Charleroi won the 2008 national title, their seventh total title.

== Regular season ==
Pos	Team	GP	W	L	Qualification for
1	Spirou Charleroi	36	27	9	Qualification for semi-finals
2	Euphony Bree	36	27	9	Qualification for semi-finals
3	Telindus Oostende	36	25	11	Qualification for quarterfinals
4	Dexia Mons-Hainaut	36	23	13	Qualification for quarterfinals
5	Liège	36	20	15	Qualification for quarterfinals
6	Okapi Aalstar	36	17	19	Qualification for quarterfinals
7	Verviers-Pepinster	36	15	21	
8	Antwerp Giants	36	11	25	
9	Leuven Bears	36	9	28	
10	Optima Gent	36	6	30	

== Play-offs ==
The play-offs start on May 13 and ended on May 31, 2008. In the quarterfinals and semifinals a best-of-three format was used, in the finals a best-of-seven format.

Quarter-finals
4 Dexia Mons-Hainaut	2
5 Liège Basket	0
3 Telindus Oostende	0
6 Okapi Aalstar	2

Semi-finals
1 Spirou Charleroi	2
4 Dexia Mons-Hainaut	0
2 Euphony Bree	2
6 Okapi Aalstar	0

Final
1 Spirou Charleroi	3
2 Euphony Bree	0
