= Loïc Schwartz =

Belgian basketball player

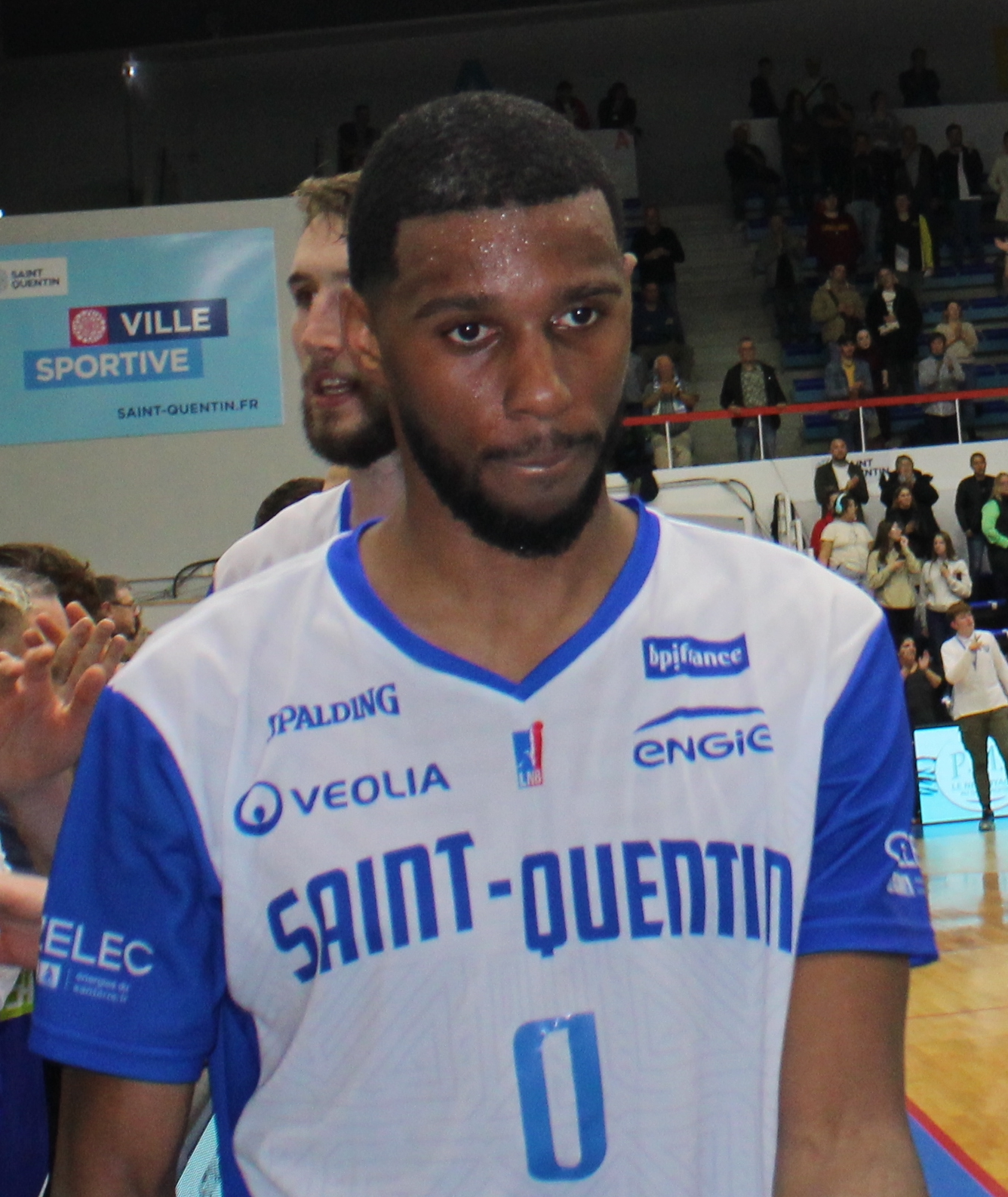

Stjarnan
- Position: Shooting guard
- League: Úrvalsdeild karla

Personal information
- Born: 4 December 1992 (age 33) Brussels, Belgium
- Listed height: 1.98 m (6 ft 6 in)
- Listed weight: 80 kg (176 lb)

Career information
- Playing career: 2010–present

Career history
- 2010–2013: Mons-Hainaut
- 2013–2014: Verviers-Pepinster
- 2014–2017: Spirou Charleroi
- 2017–2021: Oostende
- 2021–2022: Promitheas Patras
- 2022: Orléans Loiret Basket
- 2022–2026: Saint-Quentin
- 2026: Bursaspor
- 2026–present: Stjarnan

Career highlights
- 4× PBL champion (2018–2021); PBL Finals MVP (2021); 3× Belgian Cup champion (2011, 2018, 2021); Belgian Cup MVP (2021); Belgian Supercup champion (2011); Belgian Player of the Year (2021)

Loïc Schwartz (born 4 December 1992) is a Belgian professional basketball player for Stjarnan of the Úrvalsdeild karla. He also represents the Belgium national basketball team internationally.

== Professional career ==
Schwartz started his career with Belfius Mons-Hainaut in 2010, where he stayed three seasons. He then went on to play one season with Verviers-Pepinster and three seasons with Spirou Charleroi.

In 2017, Schwartz signed with the defending champions BC Oostende. In the 2020 offseason, Schwartz extended his contract with Oostende until 2023. In the 2020–21 season, Schwartz had a breakout season in which he averaged 11.4 points per game. In March, he won his third Belgian Cup title and was named the Cup Final MVP, after he added 11 points in the final. His season earned him the Belgian Player of the Year. Later, he won his fourth Belgian championship with Oostende and was named the PBL Finals MVP. In the finals series against Mons-Hainaut, he averaged 11.5 points, 4.5 rebounds and 3 assists per game.

On 2 August 2021 Schwartz signed with Greek club Promitheas Patras.

On 28 January 2022 he signed with Orléans Loiret Basket of the LNB Pro A.

On August 16, 2026, he signed with Bursaspor Basketbol of the Basketbol Süper Ligi (BSL).

== National team career ==
Since 2014, Schwartz represents the Belgium national basketball team. Before, he also played the Under-16, Under-18 and Under-20 national teams.
