= Bastiaan Van den Eynde =

Belgian basketball player

No. 12 – Basics Melsele
- Position: Shooting guard
- League: Belgian Second Division

Personal information
- Born: 22 February 2000 (age 26)
- Listed height: 1.85 m (6 ft 1 in)

Career information
- Playing career: 2018–present

Career history
- 2018–2020: Antwerp Giants
- 2020–2022: Okapi Aalst
- 2022–present: Basics Melsele

Bastiaan Van Den Eynde (born 22 February 2000) is a Belgian basketball player for Basics Melsele of the Belgian Second Division. His cousin Niels Van den Eynde and brother Mathijs Van den Eynde are also professional basketball players.

== Professional career ==
He was born in Ninove. Van den Eynde played in the youth ranks of United Ninove and Okapi Aalst before joining third division BC Guco Lier in 2015. In 2017 he joined the Antwerp Giants where he made his debut in the first division in 2018. After winning the Belgian Cup twice, he signed a contract with Okapi Aalst. In January 2022, he signed with Basics Melsele.

== Honours ==
Antwerp

- Belgian Cup: 2019, 2020
