= J'Nathan Bullock =

American basketball player (born 1987)

Free agent
- Position: Small forward

Personal information
- Born: June 25, 1987 (age 38) Flint, Michigan, U.S.
- Listed height: 6 ft 4 in (1.93 m)
- Listed weight: 240 lb (109 kg)

Career information
- High school: Flint Northern (Flint, Michigan)
- College: Cleveland State (2005–2009)
- NBA draft: 2009: undrafted
- Playing career: 2010–present

Career history
- 2010: Geelong Supercats
- 2010: Optima Gent
- 2011–2012: Grindavík
- 2012–2013: Kauhajoen Karhu
- 2013–2014: Al Kahraba
- 2014: Maccabi Kiryat Gat
- 2014: Ramat Hasharon
- 2015: Tampereen Pyrintö
- 2015–2016: Elitzur Yavne
- 2016–2017: Tampereen Pyrintö
- 2017: Rain or Shine Elasto Painters
- 2017: LG Sakers
- 2017–2018: Grindavík
- 2018: Rain or Shine Elasto Painters
- 2019–2023: Basket Waregem

Career highlights
- Icelandic League Champion (2012); Icelandic League Playoffs MVP (2012); Úrvalsdeild Foreign Player of the year (2012); Icelandic League All-Star (2012); SEABL champion (2010); Horizon League tournament champion (2009)

J'Nathan Bullock (born June 25, 1987) is an American professional basketball player. He played college basketball at Cleveland State University.

He was signed by the New York Jets of the National Football League as an undrafted free agent in 2009, but did not make the final roster. He has since played basketball in Australia, Belgium, Iceland, Finland, and the Philippines.

== Early years ==
Bullock was born in Flint, Michigan on June 25, 1987. He had played football at Flint Northern High School.

== American Football ==
=== New York Jets ===
Although Bullock did not play football in college, he was signed as a tight end by the New York Jets of the National Football League. He was waived by the team on August 16.

== Basketball ==
=== College career ===
Bullock played college basketball for four seasons at Cleveland State University, where he earned a Bachelor of Arts from the College of Liberal Arts and Social Sciences.

=== Professional career ===
==== Australia (2010) ====
In early 2010, Bullock signed with the Geelong Supercats where he averaged 19 points and 7 rebounds per game, helping the club win the SEABL championship.

==== Belgium (2010) ====
In June 2010, Bullock signed with Optima Gent of Belgium for the 2010–11 season. In December 2010, he left Optima due to injury.

==== Iceland (2011–2012) ====
Bullock signed with Grindavík in the Icelandic Úrvalsdeild for the 2011–12 season. On February 2, 2012, Bullock scored 51 points against ÍR.

He was named the best player of the second half of the season and was instrumental in the team winning the 2012 national championship, and was named as the Playoffs MVP and Foreign Player of the Year.

==== Finland (2012–2013) ====
Bullock signed with Kauhajoen Karhu in Finland for the 2012–13 season.

==== NBA D-League (2013) ====
On October 31, 2013, he was acquired by the Maine Red Claws. However, he was later waived on November 17.

==== Philippines (2017) ====
Bullock played for the Rain or Shine Elasto Painters

==== South Korea (2017) ====
After playing for the Elasto Painters, he signed with South Korea's LG Sakers

==== Return to Iceland (2017) ====
In the second half of 2017, Bullock signed back in Iceland with Grindavík on December 21 for the rest of the 2017–18 season. In 11 regular season games, he averaged 21.1 points, 8.5 rebounds and 3.0 assists per game, helping Grindavík to the playoffs where it lost in the first round against Tindastóll.

==== Belgium (since 2019) ====
On December 15, 2019, Bullock signed with Basket Waregem of the Belgian Second Division.
