= Sigfredo Casero-Ortiz =

Cuban-born Belgian basketball player (born 1997)

No. 30 – Kangoeroes Basket Mechelen
- Position: Point guard
- League: BNXT League

Personal information
- Born: 21 March 1997 (age 29) Havana, Cuba
- Listed height: 1.84 m (6 ft 0 in)
- Listed weight: 78 kg (172 lb)

Career information
- Playing career: 2014–present

Career history
- 2014–2015: Brussels Basketball
- 2015–2018: Spirou Charleroi
- 2018: GET Vosges
- 2018–2020: Okapi Aalstar
- 2020–2022: Morón
- 2022–2023: Yoast United
- 2023: Jämtland Basket
- 2023–2025: Okapi Aalst
- 2025–2026: Belfius Mons-Hainaut
- 2026–present: Kangoeroes Basket Mechelen

Career highlights
- PBL Rising Star (2019)

Sigfredo "Tito" Casero-Ortiz (born 21 March 1997) is a Cuban-born naturalized Belgian professional basketball player for Kangoeroes Basket Mechelen of the BNXT League. Standing at 1.84 m (6 ft 0 in), he usually plays as point guard.

== Professional career ==
A native of Havana, Cuba, Casero-Ortiz moved to Belgium in 2010. Casero-Ortiz played for the under-21 team of Belgian club Spirou Charleroi, where he was considered one of its top players. During the end of the 2017–18 season, he signed with GET Vosges of the Nationale Masculine 1. In April 2018, he declared for the 2018 NBA draft.

On 6 June 2018, Casero-Ortiz signed for Okapi Aalstar of the Belgian Pro Basketball League. In the 2018–19 season, he won the PBL Rising Star Award.

In 2020, he played for Spanish side CB Morón in the LEB Silver.

In the 2022–23 season, Casero-Ortiz played for Dutch club Yoast United.

On July 25, 2025, he signed with Belfius Mons-Hainaut of the BNXT League.

On July 1, 2026, he signed with Kangoeroes Basket Mechelen of the BNXT League.

== International career ==
Casero-Ortiz played for the U-16 and U-20 Belgian national basketball team. He participated at the 2017 FIBA Europe Under-20 Championship Division. He also has experience at the FIBA Europe Under-18 3x3 Championships.
