= 2008–09 Basketball League Belgium Division I =

Basketball League Belgium Division I
- Season: 2008–09
- Teams: 9

Regular season
- Season MVP: (United States) Matt Lojeski

Finals
- Champions: Spirou Charleroi (8th title)
- Runners-up: Dexia Mons-Hainaut

Statistical leaders
Points	(United States) Matt Lojeski	18.3
Rebounds	(United States) Damian Cantrell	9.4
Assists	(United States) Trevor Huffman	5.0

The 2008–09 Basketball League Belgium Division I, for sponsorship reasons named 2008–09 Ethias League, was the 81st season of the Basketball League Belgium, the highest professional basketball league in Belgium. Spirou Charleroi won the 2009 national title, their second straight and eight total title.

== Regular season ==
Pos	Team	Pld	W	L	PCT	GB	Qualification or relegation
1	Spirou (C)	32	26	6	.813	—	Qualification to playoff semifinals
2	Dexia Mons-Hainaut	32	24	8	.750	2	Qualification to playoff semifinals
3	Okapi Aalstar	32	19	13	.594	7	Qualification to playoff quarterfinals
4	Antwerp Giants	32	17	15	.531	9	Qualification to playoff quarterfinals
5	Liège	32	15	17	.469	11	Qualification to playoff quarterfinals
6	Leuven Bears	32	14	18	.438	12	Qualification to playoff quarterfinals
7	Base Oostende	32	13	19	.406	13	
8	Optima Gent	32	9	23	.281	17	
9	Verviers-Pepinster	32	7	25	.219	19	

Source: Eurobasket.com
(C) Champions

== Playoffs ==
Quarterfinals
4	Antwerp Giants	2
5	Liège Basket	1
3	Okapi Aalstar	2
6	Leuven Bears	1

Semifinals
1	Spirou Charleroi	2
4	Antwerp Giants	1
2	Dexia Mons-Hainaut	2
3	Okapi Aalstar	1

Final
1	Spirou Charleroi	3
2	Dexia Mons-Hainaut	0
