= Johan Roijakkers =

Dutch basketball player and coach (born 1980)

Kortrijk Spurs
- Title: Head coach
- League: BNXT League

Personal information
- Born: 15 September 1980 (age 46) Deurne, Netherlands

Career information
- College: Fontys University of Applied Sciences
- Playing career: 1994–2003
- Position: Point guard / Shooting guard
- Coaching career: 2003–present

Career history

Playing
- 1994–1997: Deurne Pioniers
- 1997–1999: PSV/Almonte Eindhoven
- 1999–2003: Bree B.B.C.

Coaching
- 2003–2007: Bree B.B.C. (assistant)
- 2007–2010: Dexia Mons-Hainaut (assistant)
- 2009: Belgium U20 (assistant)
- 2010–2011: Rio Grande Valley Vipers (assistant)
- 2011–2014: Netherlands U18
- 2011–2012: BC Prievidza
- 2012–2020: BG Göttingen
- 2020–2021: Brose Bamberg
- 2022: Pallacanestro Varese
- 2022: Bree B.B.C.
- 2022–2023: Saudi Arabia
- 2024–present: Kortrijk Spurs
- 2025–: Netherlands

Career highlights
- As head coach: BNXT League Coach of the Year (2025); SBL champion (2012); ProA champion (2014); As assistant coach: Belgian Supercup winner (2006)

Johan Roijakkers (born 15 September 1980) is a Dutch basketball coach, who is the head coach of the Kortrijk Spurs of the BNXT League. He coached eight years in the German Basketball Bundesliga with BG Göttingen and Brose Bamberg and in Italy in the Lega Basket Serie A with Pallacanestro Varese. He also competed internationally in the Basketball Champions League. Roijakkers won 3 championships in 3 different countries and was national team coach for the Netherlands U18 4 years in a row.

== Coaching career ==
As an assistant coach Roijakkers worked together with Chris Finch for five years in Belgium with Bree B.B.C and Dexia Mons-Hainaut. Together they reached 5 finals in 5 years and won the first national title in 2005 for Bree B.B.C. Roijakkers coached game 2 in the finals when coach Chris Finch was ejected after 2 technical fouls already in the 1st quarter. Bree B.B.C. won the game in overtime. During the 2006-07 season, Roijakkers competed with Bree B.B.C in the ULEB Cup. The ULEB Cup campaign included wins against Alba Berlin, Aris B.C., Lukoil Academic and BK Ventspils. In 2007, Roijakkers and Finch moved to Dexia Mons-Hainaut together, where they went to the finals of the FIBA Europe Cup in 2008. In 2010 they worked together once again in the NBA G League with the Rio Grande Valley Vipers and again they went to the finals of the NBA G League in 2011. When Finch signed in the NBA, Roijakkers started his head coach career in Europe.

His first head coaching job came in 2011 with BC Prievidza in Slovakia, where he won the national title in the Slovak ExtraLiga his first year. It was exactly 17 years ago that BC Prievidza made it to the finals and 18 years since they won a national title. He was named Coach of the Year in Slovakia for the 2011-12 season by the Slovak ExtraLiga and Eurobasket.com. Roijakkers was inducted into the BC Prievidza hall of fame.

In June 2012, Roijakkers signed for BG Göttingen in the German ProA. In the 2013-14 season, Roijakkers guided the team to promotion to Germany's first tier, Bundesliga (BBL). BG Göttingen went undefeated during the 2013-14 season at home (21-0). In the finals they beat Crailsheim Merlins to capture the ProA championship title. In his first year as Bundesliga head coach, Roijakkers came in second in the Coach of the Year vote behind Saša Obradović. In his final season with BG Göttingen, he coached the team to the play offs, reaching the final 8 at the bubble in Munich.

On 1 July 2020 Roijakkers signed a three-year contract as the head coach of Brose Bamberg who competed in the German BBL and the Basketball Champions League. Brose Bamberg did not loose a single game in Basketball Champions League at home in the 20-21 season. Roijakkers was released of his duties in November 2021 after the team lost 3 games in a row. Roijakkers coached a total of 253 games in the Bundesliga and 13 games in the Basketball Champions League.

On 12 January 2022 he replaced Adriano Vertemati as the head coach of Pallacanestro Varese in the Italian Lega Basket Serie A. Roijakkers was the only foreign coach in the Lega Basket Serie A. Before Roijakkers joined the team in January 2022, the team had won a total of three games. He guided the team to seven wins out of the first eight games. He managed to move Varese from last to tenth place in the Serie A standings. Roijakkers changed the face of the team, relying on young Italian players. On 14 April 2022 Pallacanestro Varese announced to have released Roijakkers for actions "not in line with the club's values". The case was sent to the conciliation and arbitration board of the league. On 4 July 2022 it was announced that an amicably settlement has been found between both parties. The settlement included the club revoking Roijakkers' dismissal and a termination of the contract by mutual consent.

On 14 June 2022 he was announced as the new coach of Belgium 2de Landelijke side Bree B.B.C, returning to old stomping grounds. He left Bree in October 2022 to assume the head coaching reins of the Saudi Arabia men's national team, representing the Kingdom of Saudi Arabia. On 13 October 2022 Roijakkers signed a one-year contract with the Saudi Basketball Federation. He competed with the Saudi Arabia men's national team in the Asian Qualifiers for the 2023 FIBA Basketball World Cup. Roijakkers' contract expired in 2023.

He then joined the Heroes Den Bosch to serve as the general manager in 2023-24. On 16 March 2024, Roijakkers was announced as head coach of the Kortrijk Spurs with the beginning of the 2024-25 season. He was handed a four-year contract. In the 2024-25 season, Roijakkers took home the BNXT League Coach of the Year award, after finishing the season with his team as runners-up.

== Career highlights and awards ==
=== As coach ===
- 2025 BNXT League Coach of the Year
- 2020 & 2021 German BBL Playoffs
- 2015 German BBL Runner Up Coach of the Year
- 2014 German Pro A Champion
- 2012 Slovak Champion
- 2012 Slovak Coach of the Year
- 2011 NBA G-League Finalist
- 2009 Belgian League Finalist
- 2008 FIBA EuroCup Finalist
- 2008 Belgian Cup Finalist
- 2007 Belgian League Finalist
- 2006 Belgian Super Cup Winner
- 2005 Belgian League Champion
