= 2025–26 Belgian Basketball Cup =

Belgian Cup
- Season: 2025–26

Finals
- Champions: Antwerp Giants (6th title)
- Runners-up: Leuven Bears

The 2025–26 Belgian Basketball Cup, for sponsorship reasons the Lotto Basketball Cup, was the 72nd edition of Belgium's national basketball cup tournament. Filou Oostende are defending champions. Antwerp Giants won the tournament by defeating the Leuven Bears in the final by 80-72, securing their sixth title.

== Format ==
The tournament is a single-elimination tournament in which the teams play match in the Round of 16, two in the quarter and semi-finals and one final to determine the winner of the Belgian Basketball Cup. In the round of 32, random opponents are drawn from the Top Division Men One and the BNXT League. After that, new opponents will be drawn for the round of 16.

== Bracket ==
Round of 32
Spirou Basket B	81
United Basket Woluwé	69
Avanti Brugge	52
Limburg United	93
G&V Breakpoint Waregem	113
BC Sprimont	89
Basket Willebroek	75
Kortrijk Spurs	123
Basics Melsele-Beveren	77
Brussels Basketball	76
BBC Croonen Lommel	86
Filou Oostende	109
Guco Lier B	103
Falco Gent	79
Basket SKT Ieper	70
Antwerp Giants	96
Insurea Kontich Wolves	90
Leuven Bears	95
BC L’9 Flénu-Frameries	100
Union Mons-Hainaut	113
ABO LDP Donza	67
RBC Namur Belgrade	80
Kon. BBC Oostkamp	82
Okapi Aalst	96
BC Guco Lier	90
Union BC Quaregnon	59
CB Liège	98
Spirou Basket	108
Antwerp Giants B	98
Royal Waterloo Basket	78
Floréal BCCA Neufchâteau	72
Kangoeroes Basket Mechelen	88

Round of 16
Spirou Basket B	72
Limburg United	103
G&V Breakpoint Waregem	63
Kortrijk Spurs	94
Basics Melsele-Beveren	85
Filou Oostende	87
Guco Lier B	72
Antwerp Giants	120
Leuven Bears	104
Union Mons-Hainaut	93
RBC Namur Belgrade	82
Okapi Aalst	98
BC Guco Lier	96
Spirou Basket	106
Antwerp Giants B	67
Kangoeroes Basket Mechelen	92

Quarter-finals
Limburg United	79
Kortrijk Spurs	74
Filou Oostende	83
Antwerp Giants	95
Leuven Bears	82
Okapi Aalst	75
Spirou Basket	81
Kangoeroes Basket Mechelen	71

Semi-finals
Limburg United	96
Antwerp Giants	104
Leuven Bears	84
Spirou Basket	65

Final
Antwerp Giants	80
Leuven Bears	72
