= 2017–18 Belgian Basketball Cup =

2017–18 bpost cup
- Season: 2017–18
- Duration: 26 September 2017 – 11 March 2018

Regular season
- Season MVP: (Serbia) Dušan Đorđević

Finals
- Champions: Oostende (19th title)
- Runners-up: Belfius Mons-Hainaut

The 2017–18 Belgian Basketball Cup (Dutch: 2017–18 Beker van België) was the 64th edition of the national cup competition for men's basketball in Belgium. The season started on 26 September 2017 and ended on 11 March 2018 with the final. Oostende won its sixth straight cup title.

== Format ==
Teams from the Basketball League Belgium Division I, the Top Division 1 and Top Division 2 (the first three divisions in Belgian basketball) compete in the competition. In the first round teams from the Top Division I and 2 play in 12 groups. From the second round, teams from the BLB Division I enter the competition. In the second round, the quarter- and semi-finals a double legged format is used. When a Division I team faces off against a team from a lower league, no second leg is played. The Final is decided by a single game.

== Bracket ==
Second round 26 September–10 October 2017
Gembo Borgerhout	63
Crelan Okapi Aalstar	84
Kangoeroes Willebroek	65	82	147
Belfius Mons-Hainaut	89	86	175
Gent Hawks	94
Basic-Fit Brussels	101
Oxaco	82
Proximus Spirou	85
Melco Ieper	64
Hubo Limburg United	82
betFirst Liège	76	94	170
Stella Artois Leuven Bears	86	83	169
Proximus Spirou B	83
Telenet Giants Antwerp	90
Cuva Houthalen	53
Oostende	106

Quarter-finals; 7–12 October 2017
Crelan Okapi Aalstar	75	70	145
Belfius Mons-Hainaut	75	81	156
Basic-Fit Brussels	59	80	139
Proximus Spirou	73	80	153
Hubo Limburg United	108	93	201
betFirst Liège	86	80	166
Telenet Giants Antwerp	59	63	122
Oostende	57	74	131

Semi-finals; 26–28 January 2018
Belfius Mons-Hainaut	71	72	143
Proximus Spirou	63	66	129
Hubo Limburg United	77	63	140
Oostende	72	78	150

Final; 11 March
Belfius Mons-Hainaut	80
Oostende (ot)	84

== See also ==
- 2017–18 Basketball League Belgium Division I
