= BC Guco Lier =

- Leagues: Top Division Men One
- Founded: 2019
- Arena: Sporthal Stadspark Lier
- Location: Lier, Belgium
- Championships: 1 Top Division Men One
- Website: http://guco.sportadministratie.be
Home

BC Guco Lier is a Belgian amateur basketball club based in Lier. It plays since their Top Division Men Two Championship in 2019 in the Top Division Men One, the second tier of Belgian basketball.

== History ==
The club reached the Top Division Men One after their Championship in the Top Division Men Two in 2019.

In the 2021–22, the club reached the play-offs with the 8th seed. Despite their low seeding, they reached and won the finals, winning their first TDM1 championship by defeating Kortrijk Spurs in the finals series 2–0.

They reached the finals again in the 2024–25 season. However, after winning the first game, they lost the series 2–1 to LDP Donza.

== Season by season ==
Season	Tier	League	Pos.	Belgian Cup
2021–22	2	TDM1	Champions	
2022–23	2	TDM1	4th	
2023–24	2	TDM1	4th	Round of 32
2024–25	2	TDM1	Runners-up	
2025–26	2	TDM1	Runners-up	Round of 16
2026–27	2	TDM1		Round of 32

== Honours ==
Top Division Men One (2nd tier)

- Champions (1): 2021–22
- Runners-up (1): 2024–25
