= 2012–13 Belgian Basketball Cup =

- League: Belgian Basketball Cup
- Sport: Basketball
- Teams: 16

Finals
- Champions: Telenet Oostende
- Runners-up: Okapi Aalstar

Belgian Basketball Cup seasons
- ← 2011–12 2013–14 →

The 2012–13 Belgian Basketball Cup was the 59th season of the annual basketball cup tournament in Belgium. BC Oostende won its 13th title, by beating Okapi Aalstar 77–76 in the Final. Matt Lojeski was the cup's MVP.

== Bracket ==
Round of 16
KBT Waregem	70
Okapi Aalstar	95
Cuva Houthalen	90
Spirou Charleroi	95
Oudenaarde	79
Leuven Bears	89
CEP Fleurus	58
Verviers-Pepinster	84
Gent Dragons	66
Liège	68
Kangoeroes Boom	74
Telenet Oostende	82
Sint-Niklase Condors	61
Belfius Mons-Hainaut	76
Gembo	96
Antwerp Giants	87

Quarter-finals
Okapi Aalstar	100	100	200
Cuva Houthalen	83	97	180
Leuven Bears	77	100	177
Verviers-Pepinster	92	102	194
Liège	83	68	151
Telenet Oostende	93	84	177
Belfius Mons-Hainaut	80	106	186
Gembo	94	85	179

Semi-finals
Okapi Aalstar	118	79	197
Verviers-Pepinster	89	71	160
Telenet Oostende	78	82	160
Belfius Mons-Hainaut	66	73	139

Final
Okapi Aalstar	76
Telenet Oostende	77
