= 2010–11 Basketball League Belgium Division I =

Basketball League Belgium Division I
- Season: 2010–11
- Teams: 9

Regular season
- Season MVP: (United States) Demond Mallet

Finals
- Champions: Spirou Charleroi (10th title)
- Runners-up: Okapi Aalstar

Statistical leaders
Points	(United States) Stefon Jackson	16.3
Rebounds	(United States) Rashaun Freeman	8.0
Assists	(United States) Darrel Mitchell	4.1

The 2010–11 Basketball League Belgium Division I, for sponsorship reasons named 2010–11 Ethias League, was the 83rd season of the Basketball League Belgium, the highest professional basketball league in Belgium. Spirou Charleroi won the 2011 national title.

== Regular season ==
Pos	Team	Pld	W	L	PF	PA	PD	Qualification or relegation
1	Spirou Charleroi	32	25	7				Semifinals
2	Okapi Aalstar	32	22	10				Semifinals
3	Dexia Mons-Hainaut	32	21	11				Quarterfinals
4	Telenet Oostende	32	20	12				Quarterfinals
5	Antwerp Giants	32	17	15				Quarterfinals
6	Stella Artois Leuven Bears	32	13	19				Quarterfinals
7	VOO Verviers-Pepinster	32	11	21				
8	Belgacom Liège Basket	32	10	22				
9	Optima Gent	32	5	27				

== Playoffs ==
Quarterfinals
4	Telenet Oostende	2
5	Antwerp Giants	1
3	Dexia Mons-Hainaut	2
6	Stella Artois Leuven Bears	1

Semifinals
2	Okapi Aalstar	2
3	Dexia Mons-Hainaut	1
1	Spirou Charleroi	2
4	Telenet Oostende	0

Final
1	Spirou Charleroi	3
2	Okapi Aalstar	0
