= LDP Donza =

- Leagues: Top Division Men One
- Founded: 2019
- Arena: OCP De Pinte
- Capacity: 400
- Location: De Pinte, Belgium
- Championships: 2 Belgian Second Division
- Website: https://ldpdonza.be/
Home

LDP Donza is a Belgian amateur basketball club based in De Pinte. The club is the result between a fusion between BBC Deinze-Nazareth and Latem de Pinte. It plays since their Top Division Men Two Championship in 2019 in the Top Division Men One, the second tier of Belgian basketball.

== History ==
The club reached the Top Division Men One after their Championship in the Top Division Men Two in 2019.

In the 2022–23, the club reached the finals of the TDM1 for the first time, losing to 95-73 Kortrijk Spurs who later promoted to the BNXT League. However, in the following season, the 2023–24 season, they reached the finals again, beating BBC Falco Gent to achieve their first TDM1 Championship. Their second championship would be achieved a year later, beating BC Guco Lier 2–1 in the final serie to realize their back to back championship.

== Season by season ==
Season	Tier	League	Pos.	Belgian Cup
2022–23	2	TDM1	Runners-up	
2023–24	2	TDM1	Champions	Round of 16
2024–25	2	TDM1	Champions	
2025–26	2	TDM1	5th	Round of 32

== Honours ==
Belgian Second Division

- Champions (2): 2023–24, 2024–25
