= 2016–17 Belgian Basketball Cup =

2016–17 bpost cup
- Season: 2016–17
- Teams: 168

Regular season
- Season MVP: (Serbia) Dušan Đorđević

Finals
- Champions: Telenet Oostende (18th title)
- Runners-up: Hubo Limburg United

The 2016–17 Belgian Basketball Cup season, for sponsorship reasons bpost cup, was the 63rd edition of the national cup competition for men's basketball in Belgium. The final was played on 19 February 2017 between Limburg United and defending cup holders Oostende. Oostende won its 18th title and its fourth Cup in a row.

== Format ==
Teams from the Basketball League Belgium Division I, the Top Division 1 and Top Division 2 (the first three divisions in Belgian basketball) compete in the competition. In the first round teams from the Top Division I and 2 play in 12 groups. From the second round, teams from the BLB Division I enter the competition. In the second round, the quarter- and semi-finals a double legged format is used. When a Division I team faces off against a team from a lower league, no second leg is played. The Final is decided by a single game.

== Bracket ==
Quarterfinals
Antwerp Giants	91	72	163
Crelan Okapi Aalstar	85	86	171
Proximus Spirou	83	97	180
Hubo Limburg United	98	91	189
Telenet Oostende	80	84	164
Belfius Mons-Hainaut	70	70	140
Stella Artois Leuven Bears	65	76	141
Basic-Fit Brussels	84	73	157

Semifinals
Crelan Okapi Aalstar	95	80	175
Hubo Limburg United	90	89	179
Telenet Oostende	74	74	148
Basic-Fit Brussels	64	72	136

Final
Hubo Limburg United	60
Telenet Oostende	76

== Final ==
19 February 2017	Hubo Limburg United	60–76	Telenet Oostende	Brussels
15:00 (CET +1)	Scoring by quarter: 18-25, 11-10, 14-14, 17-27
	Pts: Tuttle 17; Rebs: Tuttle 8 Asts: three players 2 PIR: Tuttle 16	Boxscore	Pts: Walden 13; Rebs: Boukichou, Đorđević 5 Asts: Đorđević 9 PIR: Đorđević 19	Arena: Forest National; Attendance: 6,000

Limburg United	Oostende
