= Gembo BBC =

Gembo BCC
- Leagues: Top Division Men Two
- Founded: 1967
- Arena: Sporthal Luisbekelaer
- Location: Borgerhout, Belgium
- Championships: 3 Top Division Men One
- Website: https://www.gembo.be/
Home

Gembo BCC, currently known as Rucon Gembo Borgerhout for sponsorship reasons, is a Belgian amateur basketball club based in Borgerhout. The club was founded out of a youth center under the name of Mann BCC. Later in 1983, the club was renamed to Gembo BCC, a combination of the words GEMeente (municipality) and BOrgerhout. The club is active in the Top Division Men One since 2010.

== History ==
The club enjoyed a successful period in the Top Division Men One period of 2011-2015. In this period they managed to achieve 3 championships in two years.

== Season by season ==
Season	Tier	League	Pos.	Belgian Cup
2011–12	2	TDM1	Champions	
2012–13	2	TDM1	Champions	Quarter-finals
2013–14	2	TDM1	Runner-up	
2014–15	2	TDM1	Champions	
2015–16	2	TDM1		
2016–17	2	TDM1		
2017–18	2	TDM1		Second Round
2018–19	2	TDM1	5th	
2019–20	2	TDM1		
2020–21	2	TDM1		
2021–22	2	TDM1		
2022–23	2	TDM1		
2023–24	2	TDM1		Round of 32
2024–25	2	TDM1	8th	
2025–26	2	TDM1	14th	
2026–27	2	TDM2		Round of 32

== Honours ==
Top Division Men One (2nd tier)

- Champions (3): 2011–12, 2012–13, 2014–2015
  - Runner-up (2): 2013–14, 2017–18
