= J. P. Prince =

American basketball player (born 1987)

J.P. Prince
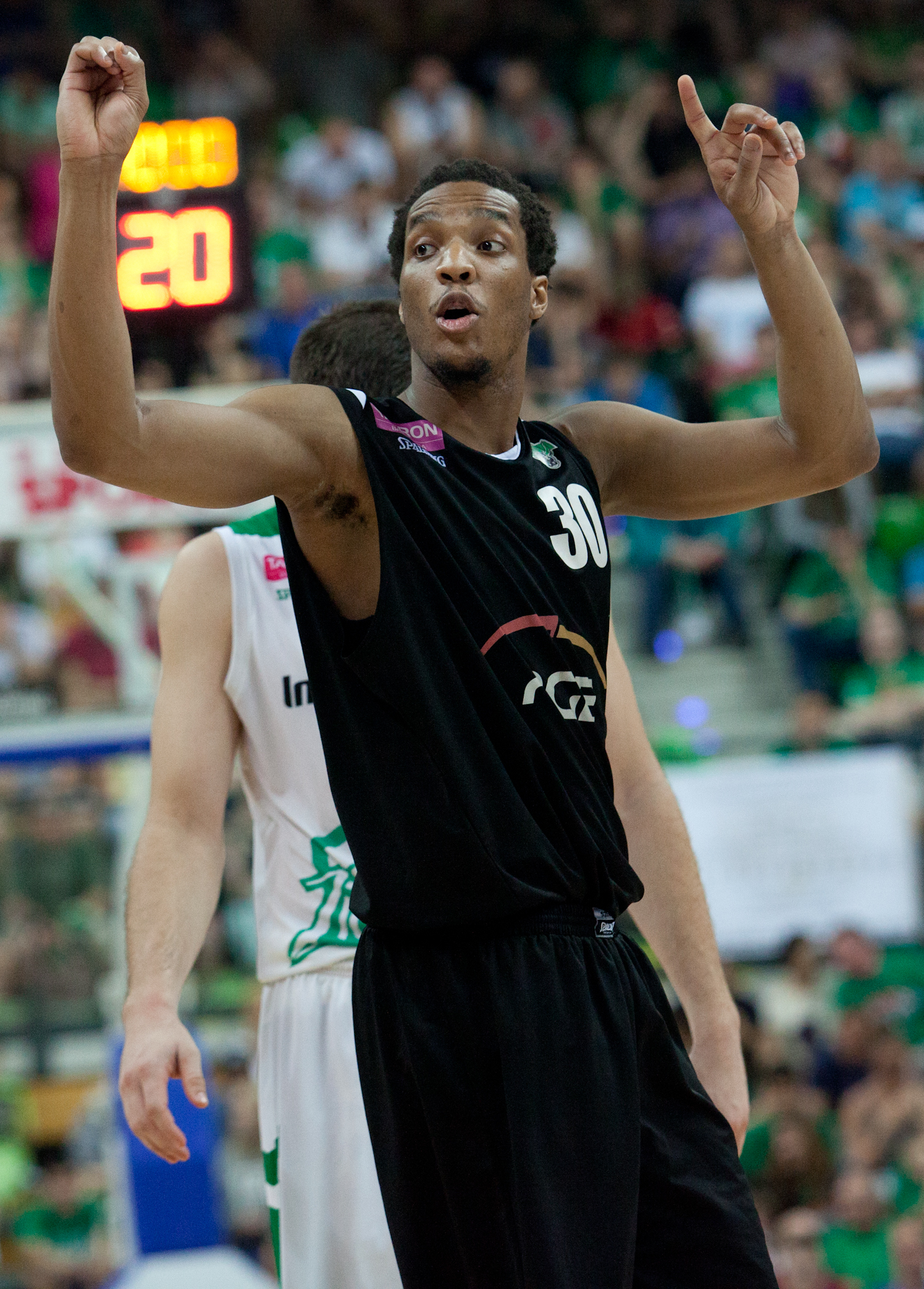
- Prince with Turów Zgorzelec in 2014

Free Agent
- Position: Small forward / shooting guard

Personal information
- Born: July 14, 1987 (age 39) Jackson, Mississippi
- Listed height: 6 ft 8 in (2.03 m)
- Listed weight: 215 lb (98 kg)

Career information
- High school: White Station (Memphis, Tennessee)
- College: Arizona (2005–2007); Tennessee (2007–2010)
- NBA draft: 2010: undrafted
- Playing career: 2010–present

Career history
- 2010–2011: Antalya BB
- 2012: Guaiqueríes de Margarita
- 2012–2013: Mersin BB
- 2013–2014: Turów Zgorzelec
- 2014–2015: Oostende
- 2015–2016: Cholet
- 2016: Trabzonspor
- 2016–2017: Azad University Tehran
- 2017: Orléans
- 2018: Antibes Sharks
- 2019: Astoria Bydgoszcz

Career highlights
- Polish League MVP (2014); Belgian League champion (2015); Belgian Cup winner (2015); Third-team Parade All-American (2005); Tennessee Mr. Basketball (2005)

John Edward "J. P." Prince (born July 14, 1987) is an American professional basketball player who recently played for Astoria Bydgoszcz. He played collegiately for the Arizona Wildcats and Tennessee Volunteers.

== Professional career ==
Prince started his professional career in the 2010–11 season with Antalya Büyükşehir Belediyesi from Turkey. He averaged 15.8 points per game in the TBL.

In November 2011, Prince signed with the Chinese team Dongguan NewCentury Leopards from the CBA.

In March 2012, he was signed by Guaiqueríes de Margarita, a team based in La Asunción, Venezuela.

For the 2012–13 season Prince returned to Turkey when he signed with Mersin BB. He led the league in steals that season.

On October 10, 2014, he signed a contract with Polish team PGE Turów Zgorzelec. Prince averaged 16.4 points along with 5.6 rebounds per game for Turow. After the regular season he won the Polish League MVP award.

On July 17, 2014, he signed a one-year deal with Telenet Oostende.

On November 18, 2015, he signed with Cholet Basket of the French LNB Pro A. On March 9, 2016, he left Cholet and signed with Trabzonspor for the rest of the season.

On October 19, 2016, he signed with Azad University Tehran.

On March 4, 2017, Prince signed with Orléans Loiret Basket for the rest of the 2016–17 Pro A season.

On January 8, 2018, Prince signed a short-term deal with French club Antibes Sharks. On February 13, 2018, he parted ways with Antibes after appearing in five games.

On July 12, 2019, Prince signed a short-term deal with Polish club Astoria Bydgoszcz. On September 5, 2019, the club terminated the contract after Prince appearing in 2 test games.

== Personal life ==
Prince is the cousin of NBA player Tayshaun Prince.
