= Paul Vervaeck =

Belgian basketball coach (born 1956)

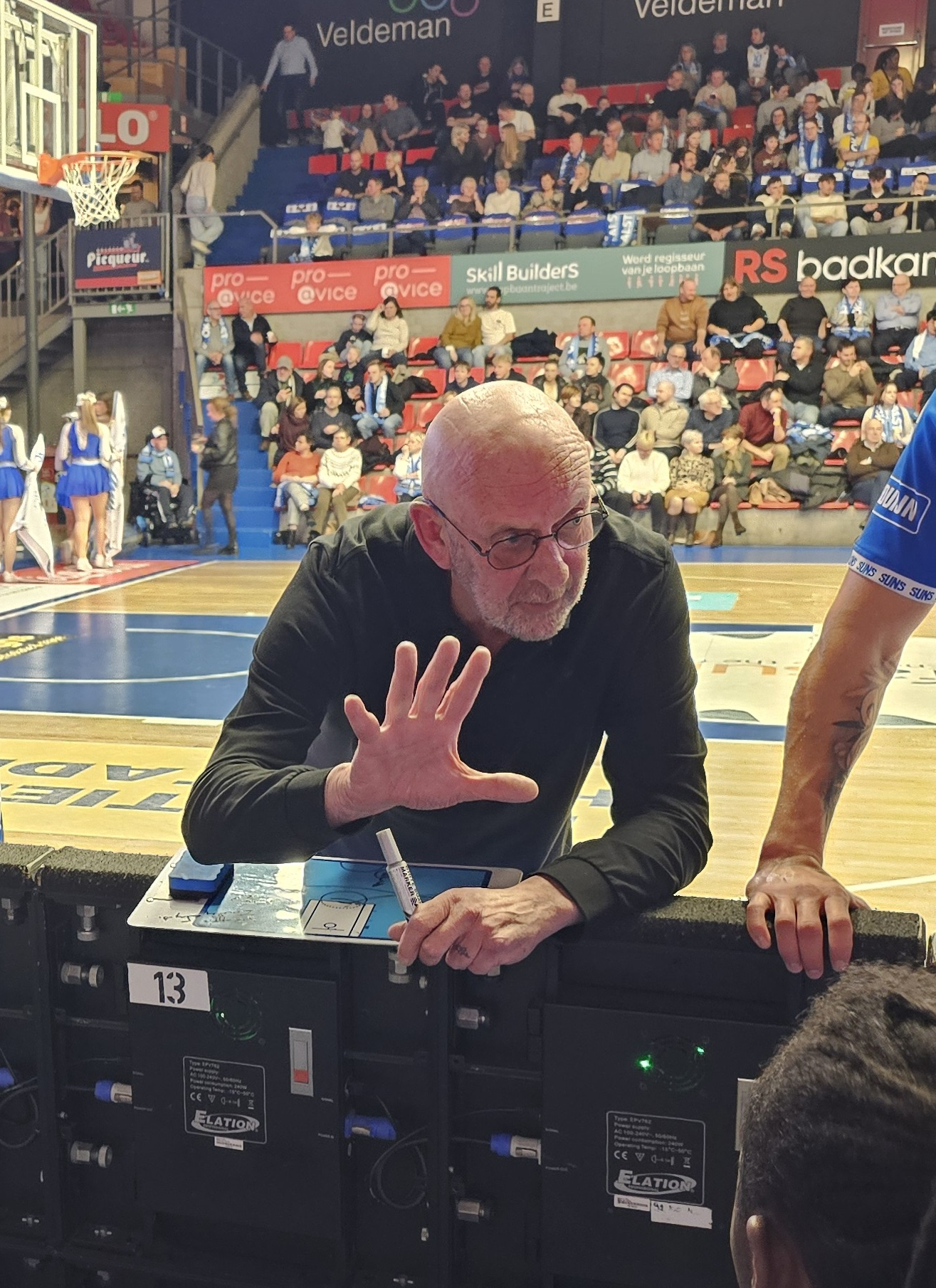

Kangoeroes Basket Mechelen
- Position: Head coach
- League: BNXT League

Personal information
- Born: 7 March 1956 (age 70) Mechelen, Belgium
- Coaching career: 1987–present

Career history

Coaching
- 1987–1988: Maes Pils Mechelen (assistant)
- 1990–1998: Duvel Willebroek
- 1998–2004: Bree
- 2004–2005: Den Helder Kings
- 2007–2018: Belgium U20
- 2007–2008: CEP Fleurus
- 2008–2009: AB Contern
- 2009–2012: Kangoeroes Boom
- 2012–2013: CEP Fleurus
- 2013–2015: Antwerp Giants
- 2016–2018: ZZ Leiden
- 2018–2021: Kangoeroes Mechelen
- 2018–2023: Netherlands U18
- 2021–2023: Yoast United
- 2024–2026: Den Helder Suns
- 2026–present: Kangoeroes Basket Mechelen
Medals
Men's basketball
Representing the Netherlands
FIBA Europe U18 Championship Division B
| Gold medal – first place | 2018 | National team |

Paul Vervaeck (born 7 March 1956) is a Belgian professional basketball coach for Kangoeroes Basket Mechelen of the BNXT League. He coached several clubs in Belgium, Luxembourg and the Netherlands, as well as the Belgium national under-20 and Netherlands national under-18 teams.

== Coaching career ==
Born in Mechelen, Vervaeck began his coaching career as an assistant with Maes Pils Mechelen in 1987.

The following years he went on to coach Duvel Willebroek, Bree, Den Helder (in the Netherlands), CEP Fleurus, AB Contern (in Luxembourg), Kangoeroes.

In 2013, Vervaeck took over his biggest club thus far when he became the head coach of the Antwerp Giants.

On 16 June 2016 Vervaeck was announced as head coach of ZZ Leiden. Under his guidance, Leiden finished as runner-up in both the Dutch Basketball League (DBL) and the NBB Cup in the 2017–18 season. After his second season, he left the club for Kangoeroes Mechelen.

In June 2021, he signed for Yoast United. Vervaeck announced his upcoming retirement after the season in April 2023, while stating his intentions to move to Spain and focus on his family rather than coaching. His assistant Jeroen van Vugt took over his job after the 2022–23 season.

In May 2024, he signed with Den Helder Suns of the BNXT League.

On February 4, 2026, he signed with Kangoeroes Basket Mechelen of the BNXT League for the 2026–27 season.
