= 2014–15 Belgian Basketball Cup =

Belgian Basketball Cup
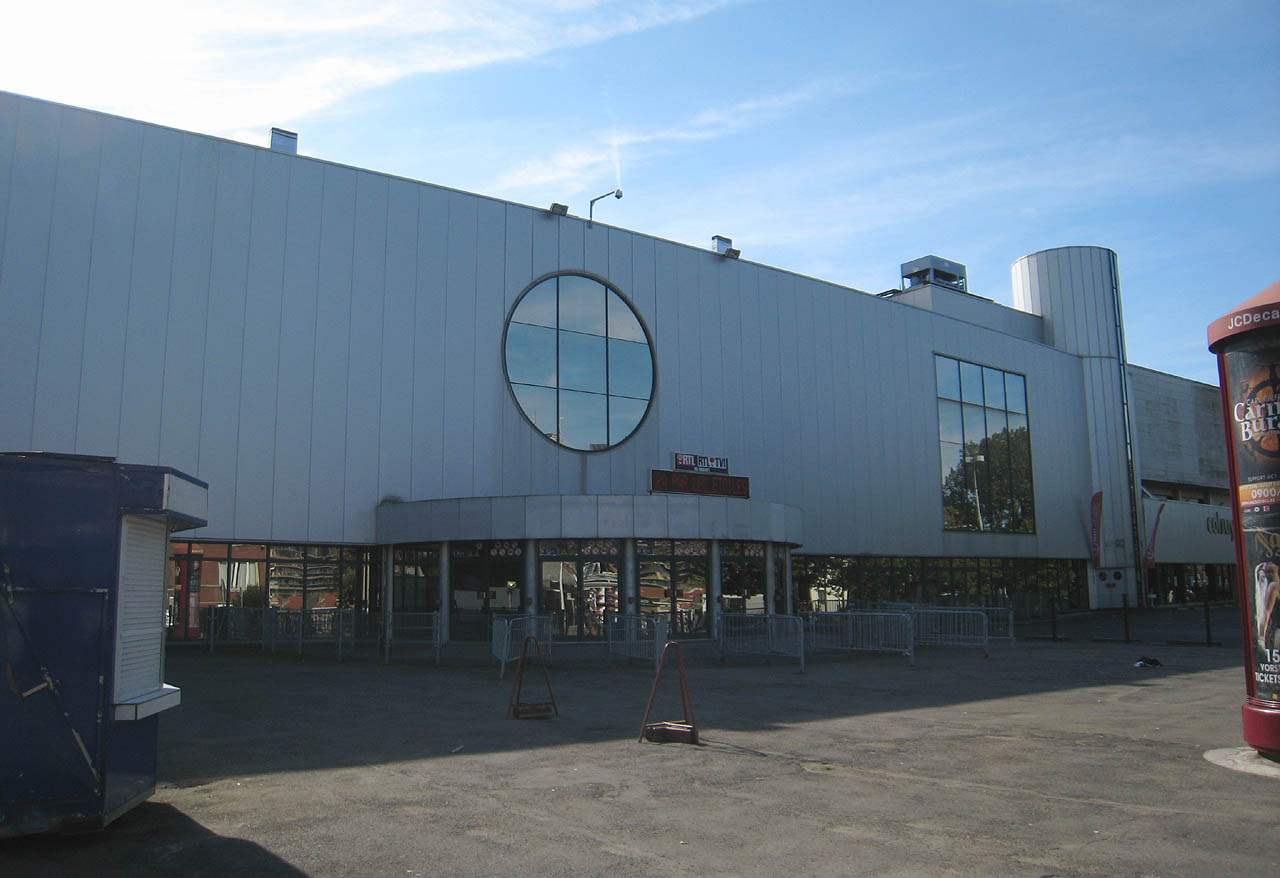
- Forest National, home of the Cup Final
- Teams: 16

Finals
- Champions: Telenet Oostende
- Runners-up: Spirou Charleroi
- Semifinalists: Okapi Aalstar; Antwerp Giants

The 2014–15 Belgian Basketball Cup was the 61st season of the annual cup tournament in Belgium. Telenet Oostende was the defending champion.

The Final was played in the Forest National in Brussels on 6 April. Telenet Oostende beat Liège Basket 94–95 after overtime.

== Bracket ==
Quarter-finals
1	Leuven Bears	74	77	151
8	Okapi Aalstar	90	82	172
4	Liège	65	81	146
5	Spirou Charleroi	64	77	141
2	Telenet Oostende	66	90	156
7	Belfius Mons-Hainaut	56	50	106
3	Limburg United	71	94	165
6	Antwerp Giants	89	77	166

Semi-finals
Okapi Aalstar	72	73	145
Liège	74	75	149
Telenet Oostende	75	72	147
Antwerp Giants	61	76	137

Final
Liège	94
Telenet Oostende	95

== Final ==
April 6, 2015	Liège	94–95OT	Telenet Oostende	Forest National, Brussels
15:00	Scoring by quarter: 0–16, 34–22, 25–21, 21–21, Overtime: 14–15
Sporza	Pts: Anderson 23; Rebs: Fields, Penninck 7 Asts: Anderson 6	Boxscore	Pts: Prince, Ponitka 18; Rebs: Boukichou 7 Asts: Đorđević 8

Liège	Oostende

Game rules Game was played under FIBA rules. 2015 Belgian Cup Winners Telenet Oostende (16th title)
