= Khalid Boukichou =

Belgian-Moroccan basketball player

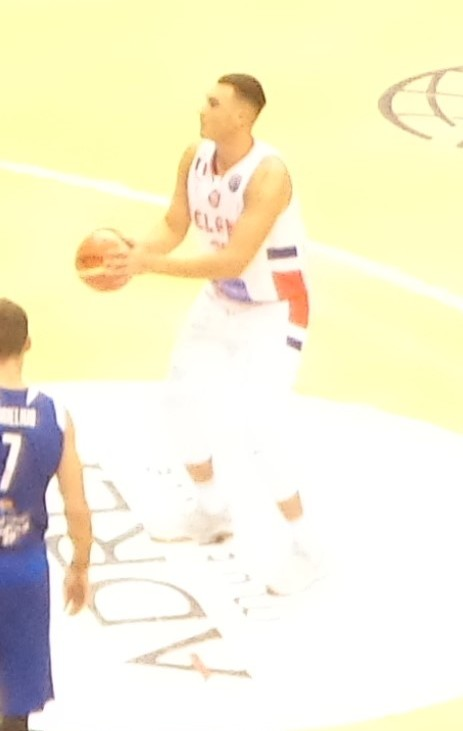
- Boukichou with Élan Chalon in 2017

AS Salé
- Position: Center
- League: Division Excellence; Basketball Africa League

Personal information
- Born: 17 September 1992 (age 34) Nador, Morocco
- Listed height: 2.06 m (6 ft 9 in)
- Listed weight: 120 kg (265 lb)

Career information
- NBA draft: 2014: undrafted
- Playing career: 2008–present

Career history
- 2008–2010: Atomia Brussels
- 2010–2011: Royal Anderlecht
- 2011: Chabab Rif Al Hoceima
- 2011–2017: Oostende
- 2017: Élan Béarnais Pau-Lacq-Orthez
- 2017–2018: Élan Chalon
- 2018–2019: Prishtina
- 2019–2020: Spirou
- 2020–2021: BCM Gravelines
- 2021–2022: Ohud Medina
- 2022–present: AS Salé

Career highlights
- Moroccan League champion (2022); Belgian Cup MVP (2016); 6× Belgian League champion (2012–2017); 5× Belgian Cup champion (2013–2017); 2× Belgian Supercup champion (2014, 2015); Kosovo Superleague champion (2019); Kosovo Cup champion (2019)

Khalid Boukichou (born 17 September 1992) is a Belgian-Moroccan basketball player for AS Salé of the Division Excellence. Boukichou usually plays as center. Born in Nador, he represents Belgium in international FIBA competitions.

== Professional career ==
In 2008, Boukichou started his career with Atomia Brussels in the Belgian third division. After two seasons in Brussels, he left for Royal Anderlecht of the same division. Later in the 2010–11 season, he played for Chabab Rif Al Hoceima of the Moroccan Nationale 1 for a short period.

In 2011, Boukichou signed with Telenet Oostende. On 12 March 2016 he was named the Belgian Basketball Cup MVP after he scored 15 points and had 8 rebounds in the Final against Antwerp Giants.

On 2 November 2017, Boukichou signed with the defending French champion Élan Chalon of the Pro A.

In September 2018, he signed a one-year contract with KB Prishtina, national champions of Kosovo. Boukichou became the first Belgian player to play in the Kosovo Basketball Superleague. On 21 September, Boukichou scored 7 points and had 8 rebounds in his debut in an 84–64 win over Donar Groningen.

Boukichou signed with Spirou Basket in 2019. He was released on 21 October 2020, after failing to show up for the team pictures.

On 26 November 2020 he signed with BCM Gravelines of the LNB Pro A. Boukichou averaged 7.7 points, 3.0 rebounds and 1.2 assists per game. On 13 September 2021 he signed with Ohud Medina of the Saudi Premier League.

On 23 February 2022 Boukichou signed with AS Salé of the Division Excellence and the Basketball Africa League (BAL).

== National team career ==
Boukichou played for the Belgium national basketball team in international competitions, representing his country in several qualifying games for the EuroBasket tournaments. He made his debut on 10 July 2014 in a friendly game against the Netherlands.
