= Nick Davidson =

American basketball player (born 2001)

No. 7 – Okapi Aalst
- Position: Power forward / center
- League: BNXT League

Personal information
- Born: November 26, 2001 (age 24)
- Listed height: 6 ft 11 in (2.11 m)
- Listed weight: 236 lb (107 kg)

Career information
- High school: Mater Dei (Santa Ana, California)
- College: Nevada (2022–2025); Clemson (2025–2026)
- NBA draft: 2026: undrafted
- Playing career: 2026–present

Career history
- 2026–present: Okapi Aalst

Career highlights
- Second-team All-Mountain West (2025)

Nick Davidson (born November 26, 2001) is an American professional basketball player for Okapi Aalst of the BNXT League. He previously played for the Nevada Wolf Pack and Clemson Tigers.

== Early life ==
Davidson was rated as a three-star recruit and committed to play college basketball for the Nevada Wolf Pack.

== College career ==
=== Nevada ===
As a freshman in 2021-22, Davidson took a redshirt. On January 7, 2023, he recorded 15 points and nine rebounds in a victory versus San Jose State. During his redshirt freshman year in 2022-23, Davidson averaged 6.9 points, 4.1 rebounds, and 0.5 blocks in 33 games. On February 6, 2024, he tallied 25 points and ten rebounds in a win against Utah State. During the 2023-24 season, Davidson made 34 starts where he averaged 12.2 points, 7.3 rebounds, and 1.4 assists per game. On February 10, 2025, he scored 25 points in a rout over Fresno State. During the 2024-25 season, Davidson made 33 starts, where he averaged 15.8 points, 6.5 rebounds, 2.8 assists, and 1.2 blocks per game, earning second-team all-Mountain West Conference honors. After the season, he entered his name into the NCAA transfer portal.

=== Clemson ===
Davidson transferred to play for the Clemson Tigers.

== Professional career ==
On July 15, 2026, he signed with Okapi Aalst of the BNXT League.

== Personal life ==
His father Kirk played for the Nevada basketball team, while his mother Kelly played on the Nevada volleyball team.
