= 2024–25 Belgian Basketball Cup =

Belgian Cup
- Season: 2024–25

Finals
- Champions: Oostende (21st title)
- Runners-up: Leuven Bears
- Finals MVP: Pierre-Antoine Gillet (Oostende)

The 2024–25 Belgian Basketball Cup, for sponsorship reasons the Lotto Basketball Cup, is the 71st edition of Belgium's national basketball cup tournament. Limburg United are defending champions.

Round of 16
Leuven Bears B | 68
Limburg United | 101
BC Mailleux Comblain | 73
Antwerp Giants | 76
SKT Ieper | 63
Spirou Charleroi | 72
BBC Lommel | 74
BC Oostende | 110
Avanti Brugge | 72
Okapi Aalst | 86
Brussels Basketball | 95
Kortrijk Spurs | 99
Kangoeroes Mechelen | 93
Union Mons-Hainaut | 78
Falco Gent | 63
Leuven Bears | 96

Quarter-finals
Limburg United | 71 | 78 | 149
Antwerp Giants | 68 | 91 | 159
Spirou Charleroi | 68 | 83 | 151
BC Oostende | 89 | 80 | 169
Okapi Aalst | 69 | 80 | 149
Kortrijk Spurs | 112 | 77 | 189
Kangoeroes Mechelen | 82 | 73 | 155
Leuven Bears | 86 | 78 | 164

Semi-finals
Antwerp Giants | 81 | 71 | 152
BC Oostende | 78 | 81 | 159
Kortrijk Spurs | 85 | 77 | 162
Leuven Bears | 80 | 96 | 176

Final
BC Oostende | 67
Leuven Bears | 58

== Matches ==
Round of 16

| 6 November 2024 | Falco Gent | 63–96 | Leuven Bears | Sporthal Sint-Janscollege, Ghent |
| 19:30 |

| 13 November 2024 | Kangoeroes Mechelen | 93–78 | Union Mons-Hainaut | Sporthal Winketkaai, Mechelen |
| | | Report |

| 4 December 2024 | Avanti Brugge | 72–86 | Okapi Aalst | Sporthal Stamina, Brugge |
| 20:00 | Scoring by quarter: 21–26, 19–17, 15–28, 17–15 |
| | Pts: Vermoesen 15; Rebs: Robijns 5 Asts: Vandewalle 6 | Report |

| 4 December 2024 | Brussels Basketball | 95–99 | Kortrijk Spurs | NOH Sports Complex, Brussels |
| | | Report |

| 8 December 2024 | Leuven Beas B | 68–101 | Limburg United | Sporthal Wilsele, Leuven |
| 17:00 | Scoring by quarter: 21–24, 14–33, 22–22, 11–22 |
| | Pts: R. Nunes, T. Nunes, Saevels, Vanderstraeten 5 Asts: R. Nunes 10 | Report | Pts: Giltay 22; Asts: Giltay 11 |

| 10 December 2024 | BBC Lommel | 74–110 | BC Oostende | Sporthal de Soeverein, Lommel |
| 20:30 | Scoring by quarter: 20–32, 13–30, 19–26, 22–22 |
| | Pts: Jansen 20 | Report |

| 19 December 2024 | BC Mailleux Comblain | 73–76 | Antwerp Giants | Salle de Hamoir, Comblain-au-Pont |
| 20:30 | Scoring by quarter: 26–17, 21–17, 16–20, 10–22 |
| | Pts: Matisse 25 | Report | Pts: Pot 18 |

| 20 December 2024 | SKT Ieper | 63–72 | Spirou Charleroi | Stedelijke Sportcentrum, Ypres |
| 20:00 | Scoring by quarter: 20–21, 25–26, 9–14, 9–11 |
| | | Report | Pts: Minchev 25 |

Quarter-finals

| 3 January 2025 | Limburg United | 71–68 | Antwerp Giants | Sporthal Alverberg, Hasselt |
| 20:30 | Scoring by quarter: 17–24, 13–20, 21–17, 20–7 |
| | Pts: Delalieux 17; Rebs: Delalieux 12; Asts: Van Buggenhout 6 Eff: Vanderhaegen 19 | Report | Pts: Flowers 19; Rebs: Tumba 9 Asts: Flowers 7 Eff: Flowers 19 |

| 5 January 2025 | Antwerp Giants | 91–78(OT) | Limburg United | Sportpaleis, Antwerp |
| 16:30 | Scoring by quarter: 14–19, 19–19, 18–15, 21–16, Overtime: 19-9 |
| | Pts: Foster 15; Rebs: Schoepen 9 Asts: Pot 6 Eff: Schoepen 21 | Report | Pts: Serron 22; Rebs: Delalieux 6 Asts: Van Buggenhout 8 Eff: Serron 8 |
