= CB Liège =

- Leagues: BNXT League
- Arena: Province Ballons Arena
- Capacity: 900
- Location: Waremme, Belgium
- Head coach: Ludovic Humblet
- Championships: 1 Top Division Men One
- Website: cb-liege.be
Home

Comblain Basket Liège, previously known as Mailleux Comblain, is a Belgian basketball club based in Waremme.

== History ==
The clubs started under the name Mailleux Comblain. In 2023, the club won the Top Division Men Two championship to promote to the Top Division Men One.

In 2025, the club underwent a name change to CB Liège and expressed their ambitions to join the BNXT League. The club hoped to bring back basketball on the highest level back to Liège, after Liège Basket folded. The new name has in CB a reference to their old name, Comblain. For the club to join the BNXT League they however had to earn a sportive promotion by winning the Top Division Men One championship. For the 2025-26 season they put together a strong roster with old BNXT players. After the regular season, they were in the first seed for the playoffs. In the playoffs, they reached and won the finals by beating Guco Lier 2-1, thus ensuring their promotion to the BNXT League.

== Players ==
=== Current roster ===
Note: Flags indicate national team eligibility at FIBA-sanctioned events. Players may hold other non-FIBA nationalities not displayed.

CB Liège roster
Players
Coaches

Pos.	No.	Nat.	Name	Ht.	Age
G	0	(Belgium)	Troisfontaines, Olivier	1.95 m (6 ft 5 in)	37 – 26 October 1989
F	1	(Belgium)	Bizimana, Mathis	2.01 m (6 ft 7 in)	26 – 11 October 2000
F	2	(United States)	Milton, Kylen	1.93 m (6 ft 4 in)	25 – 5 July 2001
C	3	(United States)	Witt, Sai	2.11 m (6 ft 11 in)	25 – 1 January 2001
PG	4	(United States)	Sow, Ali	2.03 m (6 ft 8 in)	27 – 11 September 1999
G	10	(Belgium)	Bula, Daniel	1.89 m (6 ft 2 in)	23 – 27 October 2003
G	11	(Belgium)	Bruwier, Romain	1.89 m (6 ft 2 in)	24 – 19 December 2001
PF	12	(Belgium)	Matisse, Clément	1.98 m (6 ft 6 in)	27 – 2 July 1999
C	21	(Belgium)	Bilolo, Maxime	2.00 m (6 ft 7 in)	22 – 17 May 2004
PG	77	(Belgium)	Mathy, Julien	1.76 m (5 ft 9 in)	21 – 9 March 2005

Head coach

- (Belgium) Ludovic Humblet

Assistant coach(es)

- (Belgium) Nicolas André
- (Belgium) Colson Gael

Legend

- (C) Team captain
- Injured

- Roster
Updated: October 8, 2026

== Season by season ==
Season	Tier	League	Pos.	Belgian Cup	European competitions
2022–23	3	TDM2	Champions		
2023–24	2	TDM1		Round of 16	
2024–25	2	TDM1	5th	Round of 16	
2025–26	2	TDM1	Champions	Round of 32	
2026–27	1	BNXT League	BE TBD	TBD	
2026–27	1	BNXT League	BNXT TBD	TBD	

== Honours ==
Top Division Men One (2nd tier)

- Champions: 2025–26
