= 2015–16 Belgian Basketball Cup =

2015–16 Belgian Cup

Regular season
- Season MVP: (Belgium) Khalid Boukichou

Finals
- Champions: Telenet Oostende; 17th title
- Runners-up: Port of Antwerp Giants

The 2015–16 Belgian Basketball Cup season was the 62nd edition of the national cup competition for men's basketball in Belgium. Telenet Oostende won its 17th Cup title. Khalid Boukichou of Oostende was named the Most Valuable Player of the tournament.

== Bracket ==
Quarterfinals
Belfius Mons-Hainaut	80	61	141
Spirou Charleroi	68	67	135
Telenet Oostende	80	94	174
Kangeroes Willebroek	87	59	146
Leuven Bears	56	70	126
Antwerp Giants	91	75	166
Okapi Aalstar	109	93	202
Limburg United	101	89	190

Semifinals
Belfius Mons-Hainaut	74	73	147
Telenet Oostende	96	82	178
Antwerp Giants	78	72	150
Okapi Aalstar	66	75	141

Final
Telenet Oostende	74
Antwerp Giants	52

== Final ==
The attendance of 7,000 was a new all-time record for highest attendance in a Belgian Cup Final.

12 March 2016	Telenet Oostende	74–52	Port of Antwerp Giants	Brussels
20:15 (CET +1)	Scoring by quarter: 16–12, 23–17, 15–10, 23–10
	Pts: Boukichou 15; Rebs: Gillet 11; Asts: Djordevic 7 PIR: Boukichou 24	Boxscore	Pts: Scott 15; Rebs: Scott 7 Asts: Three players 3 PIR: Smith, Scott 19	Arena: Forest National; Attendance: 7,000

Oostende	Antwerp Giants
