= Kangoeroes Basket Mechelen =

Kangoeroes Mechelen
- Leagues: BNXT League
- Founded: 2009; 17 years ago
- History: BBC Kangoeroes Boom (2009–2013); Kangoeroes Basket Willebroek (2013–2018); Kangoeroes Basket Mechelen (2018–present)
- Arena: Winketkaai
- Capacity: 1,500
- Location: Mechelen, Belgium
- Team manager: Paul de Peuter
- Head coach: Paul Vervaeck
- Championships: 1 BNXT League; 1 Belgian Second Division
- Website: kangoeroesbasket.be
| Home | Away |

Kangoeroes Basket Mechelen, also known as Kangoeroes or Kangoeroes Mechelen, is a professional basketball club based in Mechelen, Belgium. Founded in 2009, the club plays in the BNXT League. Kangoeroes have been playing in the top tier division in Belgium for 13 years, since 2013.

Previously, the team played in Boom and Willebroek. In 2018, the club moved to Mechelen.

== History ==
The logo of the club when it was based in Boom

The club was founded in 2009, as a result of a merger between BBC Kangoeroes Willebroek and Boom BBC. The team name was BBC Kangoeroes Boom, but in summer 2013 the team was renamed Kangoeroes Basket Willebroek. In the 2013–14 season, Kangoeroes entered the professional first tier Ethias League. The Kangoeroes received a C-licence from the Belgium Basketball Federation. This license allowed the team to play with a considerably lower budget than other teams.

=== Move to Mechelen ===
In January 2018, Kangoroes announced it would move the team to the city of Mechelen starting from the 2018–19 season. The arena in Willebroek did not fulfill the needs of the Division I. With its merger the club would merge with Pitzemburg Basket and the new team was Kangoeres Basket Mechelen.

Since the 2021–22 season, Kangoeroes plays in the BNXT League, in which the national leagues of Belgium and the Netherlands have been merged.

In the 2024–25 season, Kangoeroes won the BNXT League title, after finishing in the first position of the regular season with a 26–10 record. It was the Kangoeroes' first trophy at the highest level.

== Arenas ==
| Duration | Arena | Location | Capacity |
|---|---|---|---|
| 2013–2018 | De Schalk | Willebroek | 1,100 |
| 2018–present | Winketkaai | Mechelen | 1,500 |

== Names ==
- BBC Kangoeroes-Boom (2009–2013)
- Kangoeroes Basket Willebroek (2013–2018)
- Kangoeroes Basket Mechelen (2018–present)

== Honours ==
BNXT League

- Winners (1): 2024–25

BNXT Belgian Championship

- Runners-up (2): 2021–22, 2024–25

Belgian Cup

- Runners-up (1): 2020–21

Belgian Second Division

- Winners (1): 2010–11
- Runners-up (2): 2009–10, 2012–13

== Season by season ==
| Season | Tier | League | Pos. | Belgian Cup | European competitions | |
|---|---|---|---|---|---|---|
| 2009–10 | 2 | Second Division | 2nd | | | |
| 2010–11 | 2 | Second Division | 1st | | | |
| 2011–12 | 2 | Second Division | 5th | | | |
| 2012–13 | 2 | Second Division | 2nd | Round of 16 | | |
| 2013–14 | 1 | BLB | 10th | Quarterfinalist | | |
| 2014–15 | 1 | BLB | 9th | Round of 16 | | |
| 2015–16 | 1 | BLB | 9th | Quarterfinalist | | |
| 2016–17 | 1 | BLB | 8th | Round of 16 | | |
| 2017–18 | 1 | BLB | 7th | Round of 16 | | |
| 2018–19 | 1 | BLB | 8th | Round of 16 | | |
| 2019–20 | 1 | PBL | 7th | | | |
| 2020–21 | 1 | PBL | 7th | Runners-up | | |
| 2021–22 | 1 | BNXT | BE 2nd | Quarterfinalist | | |
| 2021–22 | 1 | BNXT | BNXT 5th | Quarterfinalist | | |
| 2022–23 | 1 | BNXT | BE 3rd | Quarterfinalist | | |
| 2022–23 | 1 | BNXT | BNXT 9th | Quarterfinalist | | |
| 2023–24 | 1 | BNXT | BE 5th | Semifinalist | | |
| 2023–24 | 1 | BNXT | BNXT 11th | Semifinalist | | |
| 2024–25 | 1 | BNXT | BE 2nd | Quarterfinalist | | |
| 2024–25 | 1 | BNXT | BNXT 1st | Quarterfinalist | | |
| 2025–26 | 1 | BNXT | BE 6th | Quarterfinalist | 4 Europe Cup | QR |
| 2025–26 | 1 | BNXT | BNXT 8th | Quarterfinalist | 4 Europe Cup | QR |

== Players ==
=== Current roster ===
Note: Flags indicate national team eligibility at FIBA-sanctioned events. Players may hold other non-FIBA nationalities not displayed.

Kangoeroes Basket Mechelen roster
Players
Coaches

| Pos. | No. | Nat. | Name | Ht. | Age |
|---|---|---|---|---|---|
| G | 1 | (Belgium) | Van Eyck, Evert | 1.79 m (5 ft 10 in) | 21 – 10 January 2005 |
| PG | 6 | (Ireland) | Fulton, CJ | 1.88 m (6 ft 2 in) | 24 – 24 June 2002 |
| SG | 11 | (United States) | Klesmit, Max | 1.93 m (6 ft 4 in) | 24 – 9 June 2002 |
| G | 12 | (United States) | Hampton, Jalen | 2.01 m (6 ft 7 in) | 24 – 28 March 2002 |
| PF | 15 | (United States) | Vander Baan, Justin | 2.13 m (7 ft 0 in) | 25 – 23 July 2001 |
| F/C | 21 | (Belgium) | De Ridder, Luikas | 2.00 m (6 ft 7 in) | 19 – 21 June 2007 |
| F | 22 | (Belgium) | Dedroog, Leander | 2.03 m (6 ft 8 in) | 27 – 5 August 1999 |
| PG | 30 | (Belgium) (Cuba) | Casero-Ortiz, Sigfredo | 1.90 m (6 ft 3 in) | 29 – 21 March 1997 |
| PF | 32 | (Belgium) | Willems, Seppe | 2.03 m (6 ft 8 in) | 26 – 19 October 1999 |
| SF | 37 | (Latvia) | Vīksne, Dāvids | 1.96 m (6 ft 5 in) | 25 – 7 November 2000 |

Head coach

- (Belgium) Paul Vervaeck

Assistant coach(es)

- (Belgium) Jonas Foerts
- (Belgium) Mathieu Detiege

Legend

- (C) Team captain
- (FA) Free agent
- Injured

- Roster
Updated: July 21, 2026

=== Notable players ===
Note: Flags indicate national team eligibility at FIBA-sanctioned events. Players may hold other non-FIBA nationalities not displayed.

Criteria

To appear in this section a player must have either:

- Set a club record or won an individual award while at the club
- Played at least one official international match for their national team at any time
- Played at least one official NBA match at any time.

- (United States) Toarlyn Fitzpatrick (1 season: 2013–14)
- (Spain) Eduardo Hernández-Sonseca (1 season: 2013–14)
- (Netherlands) Mohamed Kherrazi (1 season: 2020–21)
- (Netherlands) Jito Kok (2 seasons: 2019–21)
- (Belgium) Domien Loubry (2 seasons: 2020–present)
- (Belgium) Wen Mukubu (1 seasons: 2021–2024)

=== Individual awards ===
BNXT League Dream Team

- Myles Stephens – 2022
- Wen Mukubu – 2022
- Trenton Gibson – 2025
- Aundre Hyatt – 2025

BNXT League Player of the Year

- Wen Mukubu – 2022

BNXT League Coach of the Year

- Kristof Michiels – 2022

== Head coaches ==
- (Belgium) Paul Vervaeck (2009–2012)
- (Belgium) Tom Poppe (2012)
- (Serbia) Aleksander Peldic (2013–2014)
- (Belgium) Daniel Goethals (2014–2017)
- (Croatia) Damir Milačić (2017–2018)
- (Belgium) Yves Defraigne (2018)
- (Belgium) Paul Vervaeck (2018–2021)
- (Belgium) Kristof Michiels (2021–2024)
- (Belgium) Tony Van den Bosch (2024–2026)
- (Belgium) Paul Vervaeck (2026–present)

== Women's basketball ==
=== Current roster ===
Note: Flags indicate national team eligibility at FIBA-sanctioned events. Players may hold other non-FIBA nationalities not displayed.

Kangoeroes Basket Mechelen Dames roster
Players
Coaches

| Pos. | No. | Nat. | Name | Ht. | Age |
|---|---|---|---|---|---|
| SG | 1 | (France) | Berkani, Lisa | 1.76 m (5 ft 9 in) | 29 – 19 May 1997 |
| PG | 2 | (Belgium) | Van Gils, Eva | 1.75 m (5 ft 9 in) | 23 – 15 December 2002 |
| PG | 4 | (Belgium) | Denys, Renée | 1.72 m (5 ft 8 in) | 21 – 13 October 2004 |
| F | 6 | (Belgium) | Courthiau, Alicia | 1.76 m (5 ft 9 in) | 20 – 6 December 2005 |
| C | 7 | (Chile) | Morrison, Ziomara | 1.95 m (6 ft 5 in) | 37 – 15 February 1989 |
| F | 8 | (Belgium) | Kibedi, Annie | 1.85 m (6 ft 1 in) | 18 – 24 May 2008 |
| SF | 10 | (Belgium) | Résimont, Laure | 1.85 m (6 ft 1 in) | 28 – 29 January 1998 |
| SG | 11 | (Belgium) | De Vooght, Liese | 1.82 m (6 ft 0 in) | 23 – 4 August 2003 |
| F | 12 | (Belgium) | Nauwelaers, Heleen | 1.80 m (5 ft 11 in) | 30 – 14 March 1996 |
| PF | 20 | (Poland) | Rembiszewska, Amalia | 1.93 m (6 ft 4 in) | 30 – 2 March 1996 |
| F | 22 | (United States) | Bertsch, Morgan | 1.90 m (6 ft 3 in) | 29 – 20 April 1997 |
| F | 33 | (Egypt) (Belgium) | Ibrahim, Tamara | 1.84 m (6 ft 0 in) | 22 – 26 September 2004 |

Head coach

- (Belgium) Arvid Diels

Assistant coach(es)

- (Belgium) Bilal Ben Abdelkader
- (Belgium) Daphne Van Dessel

Legend

- (C) Team captain
- Injured

- Roster
Updated: 2022-12-08
