= 2020–21 Belgian Basketball Cup =

Belgian Cup
- Season: 2020–21
- Games played: 14
- Teams: 10

Finals
- Champions: Oostende
- Runners-up: Kangoeroes Mechelen
- Semifinalists: Okapi Aalst; Leuven Bears
- Finals MVP: Loïc Schwartz (Oostende)

The 2020–21 Belgian Basketball Cup, for sponsorship reasons the Euromillions Cup, was the 67th edition of Belgium's national basketball cup tournament. Antwerp Giants were the defending champions, but lost the quarter-finals against Oostende, who would go on to win the Cup outright.

On 2 July 2020, a new format and draw were announced by the EuroMillions League. Six teams from the Top Division Men, the national second division, were joined by all Pro Basketball League (PBL) teams for a group stage. The format was changed again in December 2020, due to the COVID-19 pandemic. The competition returned to its former format with only PBL teams. The final was played on 21 March in Palais 12.

== Games ==
=== Bracket ===
Play-in round
Phoenix Brussels	89	79	168
Kangoeroes Mechelen	87	99	186
Okapi Aalst	101	80	181
Liège Basket	58	70	128

Quarter-finals
Kangoeroes Mechelen	91	68	159
Limburg United	67	71	138
Spirou	73	80	153
Leuven Bears	84	71	155
Okapi Aalst	80	85	165
Belfius Mons-Hainaut	79	83	162
Antwerp Giants	55	58	113
Oostende	64	63	127

Semi-finals
Kangoeroes Mechelen	70	83	153
Leuven Bears	79	54	133
Okapi Aalst	76	84	160
Oostende	101	84	185

Final
21 March – Brussels
Kangoeroes Mechelen	64
Oostende	65

== Final ==
21 March 2021	Filou Oostende	65–64	Kangoeroes Mechelen	Brussels
15:15	Scoring by quarter: 13–16, 21–13, 13–19, 18–16
Sporza	Pts: Gillet 16; Rebs: Mwema 7 Asts: Đorđević 8 PIR: Gillet, Schwartz 12	Boxscore	Pts: Kok 13; Rebs: Kherrazi, Clark 8 Asts: Deroover 6 PIR: Kherrazi 21	Arena: Palais 12; Attendance: 0

== See also ==
- 2020–21 Pro Basketball League
