= 2018–19 Belgian Basketball Cup =

NBB Cup
- Season: 2018–19
- Teams: 16

Regular season
- Season MVP: Ismaël Bako

Finals
- Champions: Telenet Giants Antwerp (3rd title)
- Runners-up: Filou Oostende

The 2018–19 Belgian Basketball Cup (Dutch: 2018–19 Beker van België) was the 65th edition of Belgium's national basketball cup tournament. Telenet Giants Antwerp won its third cup title.

== Bracket ==
Quarter-finals
Belfius Mons-Hainaut	67	54	121
Spirou	85	75	160
Filou Oostende	83	96	179
Okapi Aalstar	80	97	177
Basic-Fit Brussels	93	81	174
Limburg United	80	90	170
Leuven Bears	79	38	117
Telenet Giants Antwerp	69	82	151

Semi-finals
Spirou	78	66	144
Filou Oostende	83	78	161
Basic-Fit Brussels	36	63	99
Telenet Giants Antwerp	74	94	168

Final
10 March
Filou Oostende	70
Telenet Giants Antwerp	76

== See also ==
- 2018–19 Pro Basketball League
