= 2013–14 Belgian Basketball Cup =

Belgian Basketball Cup
- Games played: 19
- Teams: 16

Regular season
- Season MVP: (Serbia) Dušan Djordjević

Finals
- Champions: Telenet Oostende (14th title)
- Runners-up: Antwerp Giants
- Semifinalists: Belgacom Spirou; Liège

The 2013–14 Belgian Basketball Cup or The Base Cup for sponsorship reasons, was the 60th season of the annual cup tournament in Belgium. Telenet BC Oostende was the defending champion.

The Final Four was held from 19 till 21 April in Paleis 12 in Brussels. It was the first time since 2003 the Belgian Basketbal Cup included a Final Four. Telenet BC Oostende defeated Port of Antwerp Giants 88–79 to win its 14th cup in franchise history. Dušan Djordjević of Oostende was named Final Four MVP.

== Bracket ==
Quarterfinals
Stella Artois Leuven Bears | 87 | 64 | 151
Liège | 91 | 68 | 159
Telenet Oostende | 91 | 68 | 159
Belfius Mons-Hainaut | 52 | 68 | 120
Kangoeroes Willebroek | 81 | 63 | 144
Belgacom Spirou | 87 | 60 | 147
Okapi Aalstar | 71 | 75 | 146
Port of Antwerp Giants | 83 | 89 | 172

Semifinals
Liège | 71 | 71
Telenet Oostende | 75 | 75
Belgacom Spirou | 80 | 80
Port of Antwerp Giants | 82 | 82

Final
Telenet Oostende | 88
Port of Antwerp Giants | 79

== Final Four ==
=== Semifinals ===
| April 19, 2014 | Liège | 71–75 | Telenet Oostende | Paleis 12, Brussels |
| 17:00 | Scoring by quarter: 14–16, 17–25, 25–18, 15–16 |
| Sporza | Pts: Iarochevitch 18; Rebs: Gaudoux 6 Asts: Bosco 4 | Boxscore | Pts: Djordjević 15; Rebs: Djordjević 7 Asts: Marnegrave, Echenique 3 |

| April 19, 2014 | Belgacom Spirou | 80–82 | Port of Antwerp Giants | Paleis 12, Brussels |
| 20:30 | Scoring by quarter: 18–20, 19–21, 25–17, 18–24 |
| Sporza | Pts: Mallet 25; Rebs: Watkins 11; Asts: Watkins, Beaubois 2 | Boxscore | Pts: Pearson 19; Rebs: Pearson 7 Asts: Turner 4 |

=== Final ===
| April 21, 2014 | Telenet Oostende | 88–79 | Port of Antwerp Giants | Paleis 12, Brussels |
| 15:00 | Scoring by quarter: 24–25, 26–22, 12–9, 26–23 |
| Sporza | Pts: Djordjević 19; Rebs: Echenique 7 Asts: Marnegrave 7 | Boxscore | Pts: De Zeeuw 22; Rebs: De Zeeuw 9 Asts: Turner 4 |

| Oostende | MVP (Serbia) Dušan Djordjević (Oostende) | Antwerp |
