= Kortrijk Spurs =

House of Talents Spurs
- League: BNXT League
- Founded: 2019; 7 years ago
- History: Kortrijk Spurs (2019–present)
- Arena: Sportcampus Lange Munte
- Capacity: 2,400
- Location: Kortrijk, Belgium
- Team colors: Red, Black, White
- Main sponsor: House of Talents
- President: Steve Rousseau
- Head coach: Johan Roijakkers
- Team captain: Sam Hofman
- Championships: 1 Top Division Men One
- Website: www.houseoftalentsspurs.be

The Kortrijk Spurs, for sponsorship reasons known as House of Talents Spurs, are a Belgian professional basketball club based in Kortrijk. As of 2023, the club features 62 teams which makes it the largest basketball club in Belgium. Its first men's team plays in the BNXT League.

Home games are played in the event hall of Sportcampus Lange Munte, which can host 2,400 people.

== History ==
The Kortrijk Spurs were founded after a merger between K Basketteam Kortrijk and BC Kortrijk Sport took place in 2019. The same year, the first men's team promoted from the Top Division Men Two to the Top Division Men One, the Belgian second level.

In the Spurs' second season, Christophe Beghin (former three-time Belgian Player of the Year) was announced as the new head coach. They managed to reach the finals of the Top Division I in 2022, eventually losing to Guco Lier.

From 2021 to 2023, the sponsorship revenues of the Spurs were doubled tenfold, while several West Flanders investors stepped in as well.

The last team from Kortrijk to play in the Belgian top division, was IJsboerke Kortrijk during the 1970s. The biggest feat of the team was their victory of the Belgian Cup in 1976. In January 2023, the Spurs announced they are for a license in the BNXT League starting from the 2023–24 season. In May 2023, they received their license for the 2023–24 season. On 12 May 2023, the Spurs defeated Donza in the final of the Top Division Men One season and won the second division title.

Following their promotion, Chairman Steve Rousseau stated the team aimed to play for the national championship at one point, and was hopeful for a Belgian Cup victory as soon as in 2025.

== Season by season ==
| Season | Tier | League | Pos. | Belgian Cup | European competitions |
|---|---|---|---|---|---|
| 2021–22 | 2 | TDM1 | 2nd | | |
| 2022–23 | 2 | TDM1 | Champion | | |
| 2023–24 | 1 | BNXT | BE 11th | Round of 16 | |
| 2023–24 | 1 | BNXT | BNXT 16th | Round of 16 | |
| 2024–25 | 1 | BNXT | BE 3rd | Semifinalist | |
| 2024–25 | 1 | BNXT | BNXT 2nd | Semifinalist | |
| 2025–26 | 1 | BNXT | BE 5th | Quarterfinalist | |
| 2025–26 | 1 | BNXT | BNXT 4th | Quarterfinalist | |

== Honours ==
Top Division Men One (2nd tier)

- Champions (1): 2022–23

== Players ==
=== Current roster ===
Kortrijk Spurs roster
Players
Coaches

| Pos. | No. | Nat. | Name | Ht. | Age |
|---|---|---|---|---|---|
| G | 0 | (United States) | Thomas, Jamarii | 1.80 m (5 ft 11 in) | 24 – 26 June 2002 |
| F | 1 | (United States) | Yow, Jacquez | 1.98 m (6 ft 6 in) | 26 – 2 December 1999 |
| PG | 5 | (United Kingdom) | Adamu, Amin | 1.98 m (6 ft 6 in) | 29 – 3 October 1997 |
| SG | 6 | (Belgium) | Lesuisse, Jarne | 1.90 m (6 ft 3 in) | 26 – 2 August 2000 |
| SF | 9 | (Belgium) | Bogaerts, Bram | 1.98 m (6 ft 6 in) | 28 – 30 January 1998 |
| PG | 11 | (Finland) | Kaukiainen, Severi | 1.80 m (5 ft 11 in) | 28 – 11 May 1998 |
| F | 12 | (United States) | Arnett, Dylan | 2.06 m (6 ft 9 in) | 23 – 1 January 2003 |
| G/F | 13 | (Netherlands) | Koehler, Troy | 1.94 m (6 ft 4 in) | 25 – 30 July 2001 |
| PF | 14 | (Belgium) | Buysschaert, Servaas | 2.04 m (6 ft 8 in) | 27 – 19 March 1999 |
| G/F | 21 | (United States) | Smith, A.J. | 2.01 m (6 ft 7 in) | 23 – 14 July 2003 |

Head coach

- (Netherlands) Johan Roijakkers

Assistant coach(es)

- (Netherlands) Hylke van der Zweep

Legend

- (C) Team captain
- Injured

- Roster
Updated: October 4, 2026

Note: Flags indicate national team eligibility at FIBA-sanctioned events. Players may hold other non-FIBA nationalities not displayed.

== Head coaches ==
- (Belgium) Christophe Beghin (2022–2024)
- (Netherlands) Johan Roijakkers (2024–present)
