= Belgian Basketball Supercup =

Belgian basketball competition

- Sport: Basketball
- Founded: 1979; 47 years ago
- No. of teams: 2
- Country: Belgium
- Continent: Europe
- Most recent champion: Filou Oostende (11th title)
- Most titles: Filou Oostende (11 titles)
- Related competitions: Pro Basketball League; Belgian Basketball Cup

The Belgian Basketball Supercup, also called the Generali Supercup for sponsorship reasons, is a men’s professional basketball game in Belgium, which is played by the champion of the Basketball League Belgium Division I (Belgian champion) and the winner of the Belgian Basketball Cup. It is a super cup competition. The game is played in Knokke.

== Belgian Supercup games ==
- Supercup winner listed in yellow and bold.

Year	Belgian League Champion	Score	Belgian Cup Winner	Ref.
1979	Royal Fresh Air		Sunair Oostende	
1981	Sunair Oostende		Hellas Gent^{F}	
1982	Sunair Oostende		Top Tours Aarschot	
1988	Sunair Oostende		Maccabi Brussels^{F}	
1989	R.C. Mechelen		Sunair Oostende	
1990	R.C. Mechelen		Durox Leuven^{F}	
1991	R.C. Mechelen		Sunair Oostende	
1992	R.C. Mechelen		Bobcat Gent	
1993	R.C. Mechelen		Go Pass Pepinster^{F}	
1994	R.C. Mechelen		ABB Leuven^{F}	
1995	Telindus Oostende		Brussels	
1996	Spirou Charleroi		Sunair Oostende	
1997	Spirou Charleroi		Sunair Oostende	
1998	Spirou Charleroi		Sunair Oostende	
1999	Spirou Charleroi		Sunair Oostende ^{F}	
2000	Racing Basket Antwerpen		Orange Oostende ^{F}	
2001	Telindus Oostende	69–71	Spirou Charleroi ^{F}	
2002	Telindus Oostende	78–81	Spirou Charleroi	
2003	Spirou Charleroi		Verviers-Pepinster	
2004	Spirou Charleroi	76–94	Liège Basket	
2005	Bree	75–70	Leuven Bears	
2006	Telindus Oostende	64–61	Dexia Mons-Hainaut	
2007	Telindus Oostende	86–88	Antwerp Giants	
2008	Spirou Charleroi	87–74	Telindus Oostende	
2009	Spirou Charleroi	70–84	Liège Basket ^{F}	
2010	Spirou Charleroi	85–73	Telenet Oostende	
2011	Spirou Charleroi	65–72	Dexia Mons-Hainaut	
2012	Telenet Oostende	67–72	Okapi Aalstar	
2013	Telenet Oostende	60–73	Okapi Aalstar ^{F}	
2014	Telenet Oostende	103–62	Port of Antwerp Giants ^{F}	
2015	Telenet Oostende	80–67	Liège ^{F}	
2016	Telenet Oostende	81–89	Antwerp Giants ^{F}	
2017	Oostende	92–91	Limburg United ^{F}	
2018	Filou Oostende	63–57	Belfius Mons-Hainaut ^{F}	

Notes

^F – Team qualified as the runner-up of the Belgian Cup competition, because the same team won both the Belgian League and Belgian Cup.

== Supercup winners ==
Titles	Team	Years won
12	Oostende	1981, 1982, 1988, 1989, 1998, 2000, 2006, 2014, 2015, 2017, 2018, 2021
7	Spirou Charleroi	1996, 1997, 1999, 2001, 2002, 2008, 2010
5	Racing Mechelen	1990, 1991, 1992, 1993, 1994
2	Liège Basket	2004, 2009
2	Antwerp Giants	2007, 2016
2	Okapi Aalst	2012, 2013
1	Royal Fresh Air	1979
1	Maccabi Brussels	1995
1	Bree	2005
1	Mons-Hainaut	2011
1	Verviers-Pepinster	2003
