= Bree B.B.C. =

Defunct Belgian basketball team

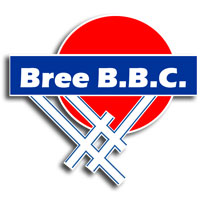
- Founded: 1960
- Dissolved: 2010
- History: VZW Breese Basketbalclub BBC
- Arena: Expodroom
- Capacity: 4,000
- Location: Bree, Belgium
- Team colors: Red, Blue
- President: Rik Monnens
- Championships: 1 Belgian Championship; 1 Belgian Supercup
Home	Away

Bree B.B.C. was a professional basketball team based in Bree, Belgium. The club was dissolved in 2010, after going bankrupt. The club played multiple years as a professional team in the Ethias League and played its home games in the Tilmans Expo Centre.

== History ==
Bree became the Belgian league champion for the first time in 2005, and played in the Eurocup the year after. In the Eurocup 2005–06 season, Bree finished in 3rd place in Group A with a 5–5 record, and lost to Hapoel Jerusalem in the 1/8 finals. They finished in 3rd place in the Ethias League in 2006, in 2nd place in the league in 2007 and 2008. Before the 2008–09 season, Bree was denied to enter the league because of their financial situation. The team played the next season in the national second league, de Tweede Nationale. The team won the championship that season, the team would dissolve on 2 April 2010, as a result of bankruptcy.

== Season by season ==
Season	Tier	League	Pos.	Belgian Cup	European competitions		
1996–97	1	Division I	9th				
1997–98	1	Division I	12th				
1998–99	1	Division I	8th				
1999–00	1	Division I	6th				
2000–01	1	Division I	4th		3 Korać Cup	R32	
2001–02	1	Division I	3rd		3 Korać Cup	R1	1–1
2002–03	1	Division I	5th		4 Champions Cup	RS	3–6
2003–04	1	Division I	5th				
2004–05	1	Division I	1st				
2005–06	1	Division I	3rd		2 ULEB Cup	EF	5–7
2006–07	1	Division I	2nd				
2007–08	1	Division I	2nd	Semifinalist			
2008–09	2	Second Division	1st				

== Honors and titles ==
Belgian League:

- Champions (1): 2004–05

Belgian Supercup:

- Winners (1): 2005

Belgian Second Division:

- Champions (1): 2008–09

== Notable players ==
- (Canada) Eric Hinrichsen (1999–2002)
- (Lithuania) Donatas Zavackas (2004–05)
- (United States) Julius Jenkins (2005–06)
- (Israel) D'or Fischer (2007–08)
