= Basket Waregem =

Waregem
- Leagues: Belgian Second Division
- Founded: 1955; 70 years ago
- Location: Waregem, Belgium
- Championships: Belgian Second Division; 2 (2014, 2016)
- Website: basketwaregem.be

Basket Waregem is a Belgian basketball club based in Waregem. The team plays in the Belgian Second Division. Waregem won the second division title in 2014 and 2016.

== Honours ==
Belgian Second Division

- Champions (2): 2013–14, 2015–16
  - Runners-up (3): 2011–12, 2014–15, 2018–19
