= Top Division Men One =

Belgian Second Division
- Founded: 1948
- First season: 1948-49
- Country: Belgium
- Confederation: FIBA Europe
- Number of teams: 15
- Level on pyramid: 2
- Promotion to: BNXT League
- Relegation to: Top Division Men Two
- Domestic cup(s): Belgian Cup; Beker van Vlaanderen
- Current champions: CB Liège (1st title) (2025-26)

The Top Division Men One (TDM1), also known as the Belgian Second Division or the Tweede Nationale, is the second level of men's basketball in Belgium and the highest amateur level in Flanders.

The league features 14 teams and the champion has the right to promote to the Pro Basketball League (PBL).

== Teams ==
There are 14 teams in the 2026–27 season.

- ABO LDP Donza (De Pinte)
- Antwerp Giants B (Antwerp)
- Avanti Brugge (Brugge)
- Basket SKT Ieper (Ypres)
- Basket Willebroek (Willebroek)
- Basics Melsele-Beveren (Melsele)
- Bavi Vilvoorde (Vilvoorde)
- BBC Croonen Lommel (Lommel)
- BBC Falco Gent (Gent)
- BCCA Floréal Neufchâteau (Neufchateau)
- Guco Lier (Lier)
- G&V Breakpoint Waregem (Waregem)
- Insurea Kontich Wolves (Kontich)
- United Basket Woluwé (Woluwe)

== Champions ==
Season	Champions	Runners-up
1948/49	Canter Schaarbeek	
1949/50	Forestoise	
1950/51	Bressoux	
1951/52	Bavi Vilvoorde	
1952/53	Saint Louis	
1953/54	Mercurius BBC	
1954/55	RSAC Liège	
1955/56	Ontspanning	
1956/57	Zaziko	
1957/58	Ontspanning	
1958/59	VG Oostende	
1959/60	Bavi Vilvoorde	
1960/61	Antwerp Giants	
1961/62	Union SG	
1962/63	FC Perron Liège	
1963/64	Standard Luik Liège	
1964/65	BBC Oxaco	
1965/66	Gilly	
1966/67	Hermes	
1967/68	Avanti Brugge	
1968/69	Athlon Ieper	
1969/70	Okapi Aalst	
1970/71	BCO Sunair Oostende	
1971/72	BC Destelbergen	
1972/73	BCO Oostende	
1973/74	Prado Kortrijk	
1974/75	Aalst	
1975/76	Royal Fresh Air	
1976/77	St Truiden BB	
1977/78	SFX Verviers	
1978/79	Rimelago Aarschot	
1979/80	Antwerpse B.C.	
1980/81	Ticino Merksem	
1981/82	Frisa Kortrijk	
1982/83	Maccabi Etterbeek	
1983/84	Duvel Willebroek	
1984/85	Standaard AHZ Leuven	
1985/86	Avanti Brugge	
1986/87	Imb Gent	
1987/88	BAC Sijsele	
1988/89	Spirou Monceau	
1989/90	Brandt Kortrijk	
1990/91	COB St Louis	
1991/92	Good Year Aalst	
1992/93	Avenir Namur	
1993/94	Free Time Center Aarschot	
1994/95	Duvel Willebroek	
1995/96	OT Vilvoorde	
1996/97	Power Wevelgem	
1997/98	OT Vilvoorde	
1998/99	KBC Leuven	
1999/00	TEC Fléron	
2000/01	BC Facom Damme	
2001/02	Ins. Wilsele	
2002/03	Ins. Wilsele	
2003/04	Saeco Union Hutoise	
2004/05	RR BC Bruxelles	
2005/06	Okapi Aalstar	Power Wevelgem
2006/07	Gent Dragons	Sint-Jan Antwerpen
2007/08	CEP Fleurus	Sint-Jan Antwerpen
2008/09	BBC Bree	Hasselt BT
2009/10	BBC De Westhoek Zwevezele	BBC Kangoeroes Boom
2010/11	BBC Kangoeroes Boom	BBC De Westhoek Zwevezele
2011/12	Gembo BBC	Bent schoenen Waregem
2012/13	Gembo BBC	BBC Kangoeroes Boom
2013/14	Bent schoenen Waregem	Gembo BBC
2014/15	Gembo BBC	Bent schoenen Waregem
2015/16	Bent schoenen Waregem	Cuva Houthalen
2016/17	Gent Hawks	Bent schoenen Waregem
2017/18	Duva BC Gistel-Oostende	Gembo BBC
2018/19	Oxaco BBC	Bent schoenen Waregem
2019/20	Melco Ieper	Gent Hawks
2020/21	cancelled due to COVID-19 pandemic	
2021/22	BC Guco Lier	Kortrijk Spurs
2022/23	Kortrijk Spurs	LDP Donza
2023/24	LDP Donza	BBC Falco Gent
2024/25	LDP Donza	BC Guco Lier
2025/26	CB Liège	BC Guco Lier
