= SKT Ieper =

Basket SKT Ieper
- Leagues: Belgian Second Division
- Founded: 1946
- History: Athlon Ieper; 1954-2008; Melco Ieper; 2008–2020; SKT Ieper; 2020–present
- Arena: Stedelijk Sportcentrum
- Capacity: 2,450
- Location: Ypres, Belgium
- Team colors: Navy, White, Sky Blue
- Main sponsor: SKT
- President: Bart Bauters
- Website: www.basketieper.be

Basket SKT Ieper is a basketball team based in Ypres (Ieper), Belgium. For a long time, it was known as Athlon Ieper and played in the First Division. From 2008 the team name was Melco Ieper. In 2020 they had a fusion with the female basketball club Blue Cats. Together, their new name is Basket SKT Ieper.

== History ==
=== First clubs in Ypres ===
The first Ypres club was founded on October 14, 1946 with registration number 230, as Basket Ball Club Ypres. In 1952 a second Ypres club emerged as' JSP Ieper (Youth Sint-Pieter, registration number 637).Athlon Ieper was founded on June 14, 1954 asAthletics and basketball association of the Picañol company, with registration number 1075 and became the third club in the town.

In 1954-55 Athlos registered for the official championship in the 3rd provincial division with orange-black as club colors. Athlon would later grow above the other two town rivals. The financial sponsor at that time was Mr. Bernard Steverlynck of the "Picanol" company. Four years later in 1958, Athlon won its first title and two years later, in the 1959-1960 season, the club was promoted to the first provincial level after a match against Oostkamp Merels.

=== Merge with BBC Ypres and Cup success ===
In June 1960, BBC Ypres and Athlon Ypres merged. The new club BBC Athlon Ypres also played in orange-black and ended the 1960-1961 season with a title and promotion to 4th national division. A new sports hall in Crescendostraat ('the Bernard Steverlynckhalle') was put into use. Two seasons later, in 1964, the club won another title and with the first American guest player in Belgium: Rex Hughes (1m93). Manager-coach Ivan Lambeets, the founder of BBC Athlon Ypres, arranged the signing of Hughes through his American network but after a few months, Rex Hughes returned to the United States. Also in 1964, as a massive surprise, Athlon reached the final of the Belgian Cup as a fourth division club but lost to Racing Mechelen with 131-62. The following year in the 1965/66 season Athlos reached the semi-finals of the Cup.

=== Promotion to the first division ===
In the 1966-1967 season Terry Kunze (1m93) joined the team, and the following season 1967-1968 it was Mel Northway and Larry Meek (2m00). They both helped Athlos win the title in third national division. The following season (1968-1969) the team was promoted to the first division thanks to Frank Nightingale (2m00). BBC Athlon Ypres played in the semi-finals of the Cup in 1969 against national champion Racing Bell Mechelen (final score 94-97). The successful run was thanks to sponsorship from Beaulieu and Bang & Olufsen.

=== Relegation to lower divisions ===
However, the 1974/75 season brought relegation. Not for long, however, because after the 1975/76 season Phil Filer and Nick Conner helped Athlon returned to the first division. In the 1977-1978, Frank Gugliotta, replaced Phil Filer. The revival only lasted a few seasons because in 1979-80 the relegation followed again. The decline had started with the low point the third division (season 1982/83).

=== Return to first division ===
Through a final round against Wasmuel and Zonhoven, Athlon was promoted again to 2° Nationale division during the 1987/88 season. Another highlight was the cup victory against first division CUVA Houthalen. The 1988-1989 season ended in 11th place. The start of the 1989/90 season was a disappointment, but by recruiting Louis Casteels, the team stayed up in 2°National Division. With the selection of several talented players, the build-up with the aim of promotion to the first division started during the 1990/91 season, which was achieved in the 1991/92 season.

However, after a play-off match with Cuva Houthalen, Athlon was relegated again to the second division. For the 1995/96 season, the club finished in third place after a good season. In the 1996/97 season with a youthful team the club finished middle of the table.

Flanders Language Valley (FLV) of the Ypres speech technology company 'Lernout & Hauspie Speech Products NV, became the club s main sponsor. After an exciting final battle with Saint-Louis Liége, Athlon was promoted again to the top level in the 1997/98 season. Thanks to the new main sponsor FLV, Athlon FLV started an ambitious three-year plan during the 1998-1999 season that should end in obtaining a European ticket. However, Athlon ended the season with a 9th place.

=== European success and liquidation ===
The 1999/2000 season was disappointing, with Athlon finishing in penultimate place. For the 2000/01 season, signings from RBT Antwerp set the bar high. The season started strongly and Athlos Ieper reached the semi-finals of the Korać Cup losing both legs to KK Vršac. Financial problems at 'Lernout & Hauspie Speech Products NV had a negative influence on performance and the team did not advance in the league. Eventually, in 2001-02 BBB Athlon Ypres went into liquidation, pulled out of the professional First Division and started playing in the third amateur local level with their youth section.

== Honours and achievements ==
Total titles: 5

- Belgian Second division (2):
  - Champions: 1968–69, 2019-20
- Third division (1):
  - Champions: 1967–68
- Fourth division (1):
  - Champions: 1960–61
- Belgian Cup:
  - Runners-up (1): 1963–64
  - Semifinals (2): 1965-66, 1968-69
- FIBA Korac Cup:
  - Semifinals: 2000-01
- Flemish Cup (1):
  - Winners: 2017-18

== Notable players ==
- (Burkina Faso) Moussa Ouattara (1 season: 2014–15)
- (England) Roger Huggins (1 season: 2000–01)
- (United States) J. R. Koch (1 season: 1999–2000)
