= Spirou Charleroi =

Val-Dieu Spirou Basket
- Nickname: Karolo's
- Leagues: BNXT League
- Founded: 1989; 37 years ago
- History: Spirou Monceau; 1989–1990; Spirou Basket de Charleroi; 1990–present
- Arena: Spiroudome
- Capacity: 6,300
- Location: Charleroi, Belgium
- President: Jean-Jacques Cloquet
- Head coach: Sam Rotsaert
- Team captain: Eric Nottage
- Championships: 10 Belgian Championships; 5 Belgian Cups; 7 Belgian Supercups
- Website: www.spiroubasket.be
Home	Away	Third

Spirou Basket, commonly known simply as Spirou, is a Belgian professional basketball club that is located in Charleroi. The club competes in the BNXT League, the highest tier of basketball in Belgium. The club's home arena is the Spiroudome which can host 6,300 people.

Established in 1989, the team is named after the long-running Belgian comics magazine Spirou, the publisher of which, Dupuis, is based in Marcinelle, Charleroi.

== History ==
Spirou Charleroi has won the Belgian League championship ten times (1996–99, 2003, 2004, 2008, 2009, 2010, 2011), the Belgian Cup 5 times (1996, 1999, 2002, 2003, 2009), and the Belgian Supercup 7 times (1996, 1997, 1999, 2001, 2002, 2008, 2010).

In the 1996–97 season, Spirou made its debut in the Euroleague, the highest continental league of Europe. The club participated in the regular phase of the tournament in four other seasons (2000–01, 2001–02, 2010–11, 2011–12).

During the 2004–05 season, Spirou reached the quarter-finals of the EuroCup, its best result on the European stage to date.

On July 29, 2014, Jacques Stas became the new head coach of the club while his predecessor Giovanni Bozzi replaced him as team president.

Since the 2021–22 season, Spirou plays in the BNXT League, in which the national leagues of Belgium and the Netherlands have been merged.

== Sponsorship names ==
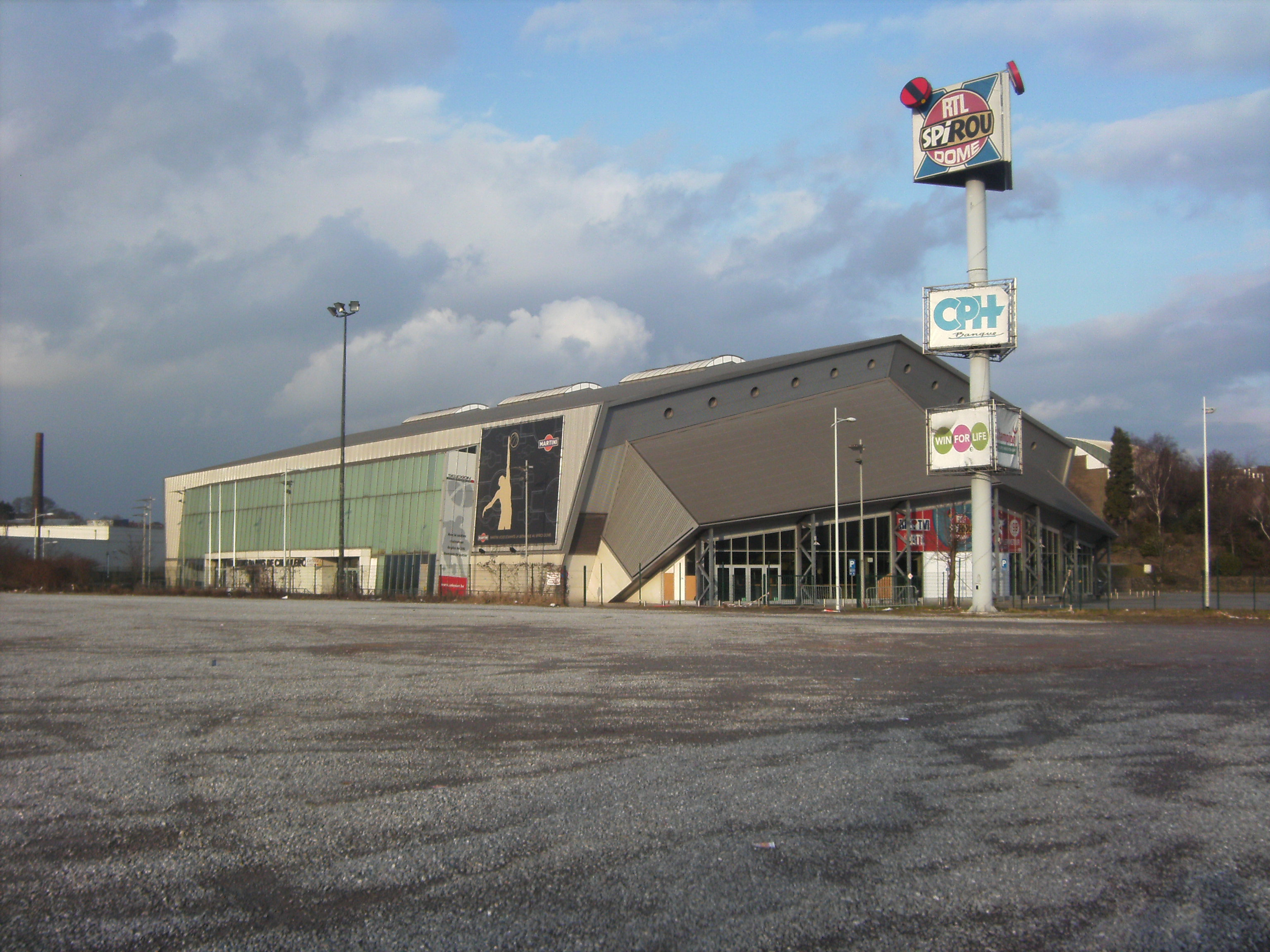
The Spiroudome

Partly due to sponsorship reasons, the club has known several names:

- Spirou Monceau (1989–1990)
- Spirou Charleroi (1990–2011)
- Belgacom Spirou (2011–2014)
- Proximus Spirou (2014–2018)
- Val-Dieu Spirou (2025–present)

== Current roster ==
Note: Flags indicate national team eligibility at FIBA-sanctioned events. Players may hold other non-FIBA nationalities not displayed.

Val-Dieu Spirou Basket roster
Players
Coaches

Pos.	No.	Nat.	Name	Ht.	Age
G	0	(United States)	Hawkins, Nigel	1.92 m (6 ft 4 in)	26 – 10 April 2000
PG	3	(United States)	Heath, Josh	1.88 m (6 ft 2 in)	31 – 28 December 1994
PG	4	(Belgium)	Makwa, Malcolm	1.83 m (6 ft 0 in)	20 – 2 January 2006
SG	5	(Belgium)	Polet, Adedayo	1.89 m (6 ft 2 in)	21 – 1 July 2005
C	6	(Angola)	Andre, Eduardo	2.07 m (6 ft 9 in)	25 – 17 May 2001
PG	7	(Belgium)	Rotsaert, Jules	1.90 m (6 ft 3 in)	17 – 18 May 2009
SF	13	(Belgium)	Zecevic, Lukijan	2.03 m (6 ft 8 in)	21 – 15 June 2005
F	17	(Netherlands)	Kruithof, Lukas	2.01 m (6 ft 7 in)	26 – 17 July 2000
C	20	(Finland)	Vaara, Luukas	2.06 m (6 ft 9 in)	25 – 22 April 2001
F	22	(United States)	Konieczny, J.R.	2.01 m (6 ft 7 in)	25 – 1 January 2001
C	25	(Belgium)	Tlarhi Amrani, Mohammed	2.07 m (6 ft 9 in)	21 – 25 May 2005
SF	33	(Belgium)	Hofman, Sam	1.90 m (6 ft 3 in)	26 – 12 July 2000

Head coach

- (Belgium) Sam Rotsaert

Assistant coach(es)

- (Belgium) Frederic Wilmot

Legend

- (C) Team captain
- Injured

- Roster
Updated: October 13, 2026

== Honours ==
- Belgian League
  - Champions (10): 1995–96, 1996–97, 1997–98, 1998–99, 2002–03, 2003–04, 2007–08, 2008–09, 2009–10, 2010–11
    - Runners-up (7): 1992-93, 1993-94, 1994-95, 2000-01, 2001-02, 2004–05, 2011–12
- Belgian Cup
  - Winners (5): 1995–96, 1998–99, 2001–02, 2002–03, 2008–09
    - Runners-up (7): 1996-97, 2000-01, 2004-05, 2005-06, 2009-10, 2019-20, 2023-24
- Belgian Supercup
  - Winners (7): 1996, 1997, 1999, 2001, 2002, 2008, 2010
- Charleroi, Belgium Invitational Game
  - Winners (1): 2008

== Season by season ==
Season	Tier	League	Pos.	Belgian Cup	Supercup	European competitions	
2006–07	1	First Division	3rd			3 FIBA EuroCup	RS
2007–08	1	First Division	1st			2 ULEB Cup	RS
2008–09	1	First Division	1st	Champion		2 Eurocup	T16
2009–10	1	First Division	1st	Runner-up	Runner-up	2 Eurocup	RS
2010–11	1	First Division	1st	Semifinalist	Winner	1 Euroleague	RS
2011–12	1	First Division	2nd		Runner-up	1 Euroleague	RS
2012–13	1	First Division	3rd	Last 16		2 Eurocup	RS
2013–14	1	First Division	5th	Semifinalist		2 Eurocup	RS
2014–15	1	First Division	5th	Quarterfinalist		2 Eurocup	RS
2015–16	1	First Division	5th	Quarterfinalist		2 Eurocup	RS
2016–17	1	First Division	4th	Quarterfinalist		3 Champions League	RS
2017–18	1	First Division	3rd	Semifinalist		4 FIBA Europe Cup	RS
2018–19	1	First Division	5th	Semifinalist		3 Champions League	QR3
2018–19	1	First Division	5th	Semifinalist		4 FIBA Europe Cup	RS
2019–20	1	First Division	5th (Note: The 2019–20 season was cancelled prematurely because of the COVID-19 pandemic.)	Runner-up		4 FIBA Europe Cup	R2
2020–21	1	First Division	8th	Quarterfinalist			
2021–22	1	BNXT	BE 6th	Last 16			
2021–22	1	BNXT	BNXT 11th	Last 16			
2022–23	1	BNXT	BE 5th	Semifinalist			
2022–23	1	BNXT	BNXT 4th	Semifinalist			
2023–24	1	BNXT	BE 5th	Runner-up			
2023–24	1	BNXT	BNXT 6th	Runner-up			
2024–25	1	BNXT	BE 9th	Quarterfinalist		4 FIBA Europe Cup	R2
2024–25	1	BNXT	BNXT 11th	Quarterfinalist		4 FIBA Europe Cup	R2
2025–26	1	BNXT	BE 8th	Semifinalist			
2025–26	1	BNXT	BNXT 11th	Semifinalist			

== Notable players ==
Note: Flags indicate national team eligibility at FIBA-sanctioned events. Players may hold other non-FIBA nationalities not displayed.

Criteria

To appear in this section a player must have either:

- Set a club record or won an individual award while at the club
- Played at least one official international match for their national team at any time
- Played at least one official NBA match at any time.

- (Belgium) Christophe Beghin
- (Belgium) Ralph Biggs
- (Belgium) Marcus Faison
- (Belgium) Niels Marnegrave
- (Belgium) Sacha Massot
- (Belgium) Didier Mbenga
- (Belgium) Wen Mukubu
- (Belgium) Jacques Stas
- (Belgium) Eric Struelens
- (Belgium) Kevin Tumba
- (Bosnia and Herzegovina) Damir Krupalija
- (Georgia (country)) Tornike Shengelia
- (Portugal) Rafael Lisboa
- (United States) Mike Batiste
- (United States) Ron Ellis
- (United States) Justin Hamilton
- (United States) Dario Hunt
- (United States) Demond Mallet
- (United States) Andre Riddick
- (United States) Mitch Smith
- (United States) Matt Walsh
- (Sweden) Alexander Lindqvist
