= Gent Hawks =

- Leagues: Belgian Second Division
- Founded: 1950; 75 years ago
- Arena: Tolhuis
- Capacity: 2,374
- Location: Ghent, Belgium
- Team colors: Red, Black
- President: Yannick de Clerq
- Championships: 1 Belgian Championship; 1 Belgian Cup; 2 Second Division
- Website: genthawks.be
Home	Away

Gent Hawks, for sponsorship reasons Wanty Gent Hawks, is a Belgian professional basketball club that is located in the Gent area of the Province of East-Flanders, Belgium. The club competes in the second basketball division in Belgium. The team was founded in 1950 as Hellas Gent. The team plays home games at the 2,374 seat Tolhuis. The club has played in the Belgian highest division since 2007. The season before, they became champion in the second division.

== Names ==
- 1950 – 1991 : Hellas Gent
- 1991 – 1995 : Bobcat Gent
- 1995 – 1997 : AST Gent
- 1997 – 2000 : Siemens Gent
- 2000 – 2002 : Gent United
- 2002 – 2007 : Gent Dragons
- 2007 – 2012 : Optima Gent
- 2012 – 2013: Gent Dragons
- 2013 – present: Gent Hawks

== Season by season ==
Season	Tier	League	Pos.	Postseason	Cup	RS	PO	CU
2002–03	2	Tweede Nationale	8	–	–		–	
2003–04	2	Tweede Nationale	10	–	–		–	
2004–05	2	Tweede Nationale	7	–	–		–	
2005–06	2	Tweede Nationale	8	–	–	12–12	–	
2006–07	2	Tweede Nationale	2	Champion	–	20–6	4–2	
2007–08	1	BLB	10	–	–	6–30	–	
2008–09	1	BLB	8	–	–	9–23	–	
2009–10	1	BLB	8	–	–	10–22	–	
2010–11	1	BLB	9	–	–	5–27	–	
2011–12	1	BLB	7	–	–	12–20	–	
2012–13	2	Tweede Nationale	9	–	–	13–15	–	–
2013–14	2	Tweede Nationale	8	–	–	16–14	–	–

== Honors and titles ==
=== Domestic competitions ===
Belgian League:

- Champions (1): 1955

Belgian Cup:

- Winners (1): 1992

Belgian 2nd Division:

- Champions (2): 2007, 2017

=== European competitions ===
- 1991–92 FIBA Korać Cup: Second Round
