= Okapi Aalst =

Partena Professional Okapi Aalst
- Leagues: BNXT League
- Founded: 15 November 1949; 76 years ago
- History: List: BBC Aalst 1949–2002 Okapi Aalstar 2002–2020 Okapi Aalst 2020–present
- Arena: Okapi Forum
- Capacity: 2,800
- Location: Aalst, Belgium
- Team colors: Blue, White,
- CEO: Bart De Moor
- President: Kristof De Saedeleer
- Head coach: Olivier Foucart
- Team captain: Ivan Maraš
- Championships: 1 Belgian Cup; 2 Belgian Supercups
- Website: okapiaalst.be
Home	Away

Okapi Aalst, also known as Partena Professional Okapi Aalst for sponsorship reasons, is a Belgian professional basketball club from Aalst, Belgium. The club competes in the top tier BNXT League and plays its home games in the Okapi Forum, which has a seating capacity of 2,800 people.

Okapi is a long-time participant of the Belgian first division, is the owner of one Belgian Cup and two Supercups. As well, Aalst was a regular participant in European competitions in the past.

In its history the team has included many quality players who would be named Belgian League MVP or have played for top Euroleague and NBA teams, such as Chris Copeland and Matt Lojeski.

== History ==
Okapi was founded on 15 November 1949 by a group of friends in Aalst, almost all going to the school named Aalsterse Atheneum. Piet de Coninck van Noyen was one of the founders. In 1956, Odilon Ringoir became the first chairman of the club. In 1957, the municipality of Aalst allowed the team to play outside at the Hopmarkt and as a result more spectators watched the team's matches. In the winter months, the team played inside a shoe factory in Terjoden. In the 1958–59 season, Okapi promoted to the fourth national league. In 1969, the first foreign players where signed to keep up with opposing teams.

In the 1969–70 season, Okapi won the national second division title in an impressive way by going unbeaten in all 44 games. In the 1970–71 season, the club made its maiden debut at the First National League. The team stayed there for five years until it was relegated again. The downfall lasted shortly as the team promoted back the next season. In the following seasons, Okapi enjoyed the first league in which local Derbys against Black Boys Aalst were played. In 1980, the team relegated once again.

In the 2011–12 season, Aalstar won its first trophy ever with its Belgian Basketball Cup victory. Okapi defeated Antwerp Giants 96–89 after overtime. By winning the Cup, Okapi qualified for the Belgian Supercup the next season, which it also won after defeating BC Oostende. In 2013, Okapi won the Supercup for the second consecutive year by beating Oostende once again.

In the 2013–14 season, Okapi reached the Finals of the Belgian League for the first time. In the Finals, the team was swept by Oostende, which went on to win its third straight title.

In June 2020, the team changed its name from Okapi Aalstar back to Okapi Aalst. Since the 2021–22 season, Okapi plays in the BNXT League, in which the national leagues of Belgium and the Netherlands have been merged.

== Honours and titles ==
Belgian League:

- Runners-up (2): 2013–14 2015-2016

Belgian Cup

- Winners (1): 2011–12
  - Runners-up (3): 1963–64, 1997–98, 2012–13

Belgian Supercup

- Winners (2): 2012, 2013

Belgian Second Division

- Winners (3): 1969-70, 1974-75, 2005–06

== Season by season ==
Season	Tier	League	Pos.	Belgian Cup	European competitions		Other competitions	
2011–12	1	BLB	5th	Champion	3 EuroChallenge	T16		
2012–13	1	BLB	4th	Runner–up	3 EuroChallenge	T16	Supercup	C
2013–14	1	BLB	2nd	Semifinalist	3 EuroChallenge	RS	Supercup	C
2014–15	1	BLB	3rd	Semifinalist	3 EuroChallenge	T16		
2015–16	1	BLB	2nd	Semifinalist				
2016–17	1	BLB	5th	Semifinalist				
2017–18	1	BLB	4th	Quarterfinalist				
2018–19	1	BLB	7th	Quarterfinalist				
2019–20 (Note: The 2019–20 season was cancelled early due to the COVID-19 pandemic.)	1	PBL	8th					
2020–21	1	PBL	7th	Semifinalist				
2021–22	1	BNXT	13th	–				
2022–23	1	BNXT	12th	–				
2023–24	1	BNXT	15th	Round of 16				
2024–25	1	BNXT	13th	Quarterfinalist				
2025–26	1	BNXT	3rd	Quarterfinalist				

== Logos ==
The official Okapi Aalstar crest

Crelan Okapi Aalstar
(2015–2020)

== Players ==
=== Current roster ===
Note: Flags indicate national team eligibility at FIBA-sanctioned events. Players may hold other non-FIBA nationalities not displayed.

Partena Professional Okapi Aalst roster
Players
Coaches

Pos.	No.	Nat.	Name	Ht.	Age
SG	1	(United States)	Thomas, Malik	1.96 m (6 ft 5 in)	24 – 4 February 2002
F	2	(Belgium)	Raedschelders, Alexander	1.98 m (6 ft 6 in)	21 – 9 June 2005
SF	3	(Belgium)	Lasisi, Elias	1.92 m (6 ft 4 in)	34 – 9 January 1992
G	5	(Belgium)	Libert, Alexandre	1.88 m (6 ft 2 in)	36 – 25 January 1990
G	6	(Belgium)	Temmerman, Glenn	1.90 m (6 ft 3 in)	25 – 1 July 2001
F/C	7	(United States)	Davidson, Nick	2.08 m (6 ft 10 in)	24 – 26 November 2001
SG	8	(Belgium)	T'Joncke, Vincent	1.85 m (6 ft 1 in)	18 – 31 October 2007
G	9	(Belgium)	Van Den Eynde, Niels	1.78 m (5 ft 10 in)	25 – 27 December 2000
PF	11	(Australia)	Anticevich, Grant	2.03 m (6 ft 8 in)	28 – 14 April 1998
C	15	(Belgium)	Palinckx, Mattias	2.08 m (6 ft 10 in)	29 – 17 February 1997

Head coach

- (Belgium) Olivier Foucart

Assistant coach(es)

- (Belgium) Stijn Penninck
- (Belgium) Jan Guns

Legend

- (C) Team captain
- (FA) Free agent
- Injured

- Roster
- Transactions
Updated: July 21, 2026

=== Notable players ===
Note: Flags indicate national team eligibility at FIBA-sanctioned events. Players may hold other non-FIBA nationalities not displayed.

Criteria

To appear in this section a player must have either:

- Set a club record or won an individual award while at the club
- Played at least one official international match for their national team at any time
- Played at least one official NBA match at any time.

- (United States) Daren Queenan
- (United States) Chris Copeland
- (United States) Derek Raivio
- (United States) Justin Holiday
- (United States) Da'Sean Butler
- (United States) John Tofi
- (United States) Alex Ruoff
- (Socialist Federal Republic of Yugoslavia) Borislav Vučević
- (Belgium) Matt Lojeski
- (Belgium) Ronny Bayer
- (Belgium) Frank Van Impe
- (Belgium) Pieter Loridon
- (Belgium) Steve Ibens
- (Belgium) Thomas Van Den Spiegel
- (Belgium) Niels Van Den Eynde
