= Belgian Basketball Cup =

Belgian annual basketball cup tournament

- Current season, competition or edition: 2026–27 Belgian Basketball Cup
- Sport: Basketball
- Founded: 1954; 72 years ago
- Country: Belgium
- Continent: FIBA Europe (Europe)
- Most recent champion: Antwerp Giants (6th title) (2025–26)
- Most titles: Oostende (21 titles)
- Related competitions: Pro Basketball League; Belgian Supercup
- Website: Official website

The Belgian Basketball Cup (Beker van België / Coupe de Belgique), for sponsorship reasons the Lotto Basketball Cup, is the top tier national basketball cup competition in Belgium. The tournament is played in a knock-out format, in which teams are drawn against each other. Oostende is the most successful club in the competition's history, as it won 19 titles. Antwerp Giants are the last team to have won the Cup, having won the 2025 edition.

== History ==
Former logo of the Belgian Cup

In 2013, the cup got a new name in The Base Cup, referring to the new main sponsor Base. The mobile telephony provider signed a sponsorship contract for 3 years. This led to, in the 2013–14 season, the first time a Final Four was held instead of semi-finals with two legs since 2003.

== Format ==
Teams from the Basketball League Belgium Division I, the Top Division 1 and Top Division 2 (the first three divisions in Belgian basketball) compete in the competition. In the first round teams from the Top Division I and 2 play in 12 groups. From the second round, teams from the BLB Division I enter the competition. In the second round, the quarter- and semi-finals a double legged format is used. When a Division I team faces off against a team from a lower league, no second leg is played. The Final is decided by a single game.

== Sponsorship names ==
Due to sponsorship reasons, the cup competition has known several names:

- Base Cup (2013–2016)
- bpost cup (2016–2019)
- EuroMillions Cup (2020–2022)
- Lotto Cup (2022–present)

== Finals ==
Key
OT	Match was won after overtime

Season	Location	Venue	Winner	Score	Runner-up	MVP (Note: The Most Valuable Player award was introduced in 2013.)	Ref(s)
1953–54			Semailles	70–59	Altitude B.C.	—N/a	
1954–55			Semailles	57–49	Amicale Sportive	—N/a	
1955–56			Semailles	71–69	Antwerpse (Note: Antwerpse started the 1956 Final with a 20-point lead)	—N/a	
1956–57			Brabo	67–56	Canter	—N/a	
1957–58			Semailles	62–57	Brabo	—N/a	
1958–59			Racing C.B.	66–65	Antwerpse	—N/a	
1959–60			Royal IV	58–47	Racing C.B.	—N/a	
1960–61			Antwerpse	72–61	V.G. Oostende	—N/a	
1961–62			V.G. Oostende	65–63	Racing C.B.	—N/a	
1962–63			Standard Liège	66–59	Sint Niklaas	—N/a	
1963–64			Racing Mechelen	121–62	Athlon Ieper	—N/a	
1964–65			Racing Mechelen	89–73	Racing White	—N/a	
1965–66			Royal IV	88–68	Okapi Aalst	—N/a	
1966–67			Royal IV	70–67	Avanti Brugge (Note: Avanti Brugge started the 1967 Final with a 10-point lead because the team was from the Third Division.)	—N/a	
1967–68			Royal IV	75–51	Oxaco Tornado	—N/a	
1968–69			Standard Liège	80–72	Racing Bell Mechelen	—N/a	
1969–70			Racing Bell Mechelen	70–56	Bus Fruit Lier	—N/a	
1970–71			Racing Bell Mechelen	72–67	Standard CL	—N/a	
1971–72			Antwerpse	91–77	Bus Fruit Lier	—N/a	
1972–73			Royal IV	86–84	Bus Fruit Lier	—N/a	
1973–74			Antwerpse	75–72	Bus Fruit Lier	—N/a	
1974–75			Lier	108–102	Maes Pils	—N/a	
1975–76			IJsboerke Kortrijk	70–69	Immo Scheers Lier	—N/a	
1976–77			Standard Liège	102–85	Eveil Monceau	—N/a	
1977–78			Avanti Brugge	72–69	Standard Boule d'Or	—N/a	
1978–79			Oostende	77–66	Fresh Air	—N/a	
1979–80			Verviers-Pepinster	73–72	Oostende	—N/a	
1980–81			Oostende	101–73	Hellas Gent	—N/a	
1981–82			Oostende	78–67	Aarschot	—N/a	
1982–83			Oostende	86–66	Maccabi Brussels (Note: In the 1983 Final, Maccabi Brussels got a 10-point lead before the match because the team was from the second division)	—N/a	
1983–84			Maccabi Brussels	80–64	Verviers-Pepinster	—N/a	
1984–85			Oostende	108–94	Opel Merksem	—N/a	
1985–86			Maes Pils	98–70	Boule d'Or Andenne	—N/a	
1986–87			Maes Pils	112–71, 84–101	Assubel Mariembourg	—N/a	
1987–88			Maccabi Brussels	72–61	Assubel Mariembourg	—N/a	
1988–89			Oostende	72–66	Maccabi Brussels	—N/a	
1989–90			Maes Pils	96–58	Leuven	—N/a	
1990–91			Oostende	75–74 (OT)	Bobcat Gent	—N/a	
1991–92			Bobcat Gent	68–55	Oostende	—N/a	
1992–93			Maes Pils	97–72	Verviers-Pepinster	—N/a	
1993–94			Maes Pils	87–80	Leuven	—N/a	
1994–95			Basket Brussels	69–60	Spirou	—N/a	
1995–96			Spirou	65–63	Oostende	—N/a	
1996–97			Oostende	90–80	Spirou	—N/a	
1997–98			Oostende	90–80	Aalst	—N/a	
1998–99			Spirou	91–85 (3OT)	Oostende	—N/a	
1999–00			Racing Antwerpen	82–65	Oostende	—N/a	
2000–01			Oostende	93–79	Spirou	—N/a	
2001–02			Spirou	96–65	Power Wevelgem	—N/a	
2002–03			Spirou	115–68	Spirou Gilly (Note: Spirou Gilly got a 15-point leader before the start of the match, because the club was from the second division)	—N/a	
2003–04			Liège	87–83	Oostende	—N/a	
2004–05			Leuven Bears	87–80	Spirou	—N/a	
2005–06			Mons-Hainaut	69–59	Spirou	—N/a	
2006–07	Leuven	Sportoase	Antwerp Giants	70–64	Liège	—N/a	
2007–08	Charleroi	Spiroudome	Oostende	66–63	Spirou	—N/a	
2008–09	Leuven	Sportoase	Spirou	63–51	Liège	—N/a	
2009–10	Liège	Country Hall Ethias	Oostende	82–63	Spirou	—N/a	
2010–11	Antwerp	Lotto Arena	Mons-Hainaut	68–66	Oostende	—N/a	
2011–12	Antwerp	Lotto Arena	Okapi Aalstar	96–89 (OT)	Antwerp Giants	—N/a	
2012–13	Antwerp	Lotto Arena	Oostende	77–76	Okapi Aalstar	(Belgium) Matt Lojeski	
2013–14	Brussels	Palais/Paleis 12	Oostende	88–79	Antwerp Giants	(Serbia) Dušan Đorđević	
2014–15	Brussels	Forest National; Vorst Nationaal	Oostende	94–93 (OT)	Liège	—N/a	
2015–16	Brussels	Forest National; Vorst Nationaal	Oostende	72–54	Antwerp Giants	(Belgium) Khalid Boukichou	
2016–17	Brussels	Forest National; Vorst Nationaal	Oostende	76–60	Limburg United	(Serbia) Dušan Đorđević	
2017–18	Brussels	Forest National; Vorst Nationaal	Oostende	84–80	Mons-Hainaut	(Serbia) Dušan Đorđević	
2018–19	Brussels	Forest National; Vorst Nationaal	Antwerp Giants	76–70	Oostende	(Belgium) Ismaël Bako	
2019–20	Brussels	Forest National; Vorst Nationaal	Antwerp Giants	83–78	Spirou	(Slovenia) Luka Rupnik	
2020–21	Brussels	Palais/Paleis 12	Oostende	65–64	Kangoeroes Mechelen	(Belgium) Loïc Schwartz	
2021–22	Brussels	Forest National; Vorst Nationaal	Limburg United	79–73	Oostende	(United States) Tyrell Nelson	
2022–23	Brussels	Forest National; Vorst Nationaal	Antwerp Giants	77–71	Oostende	(United States) Spencer Butterfield	
2023–24	Brussels	Forest National; Vorst Nationaal	Limburg United	70–58	Spirou	(United States) David Collins	
2024–25	Ostend	COREtec Dôme	Filou Oostende	67–58	Leuven Bears	(Belgium) Pierre-Antoine Gillet	
2025–26	Charleroi	Spiroudome	Antwerp Giants	80–72	Leuven Bears		
2026–27							

== See also ==
- Belgian Basketball Cup MVP
