= CityX Mons =

- Nickname: Renards (Foxes)
- Leagues: BNXT League
- Founded: 1959; 67 years ago
- History: List: Quaregnon (1959–1998) Telindus Union Mons-Hainaut (1998–2001) Dexia Mons-Hainaut (2001-–2012) Belfius Mons-Hainaut (2012–2024)
- Arena: Mons.Arena
- Capacity: 3,700
- Location: Mons, Wallonia, Belgium
- Team colors: Burgundy, White
- General manager: Pape-Philippe Amagou
- Head coach: Frank De Meulemeester
- Championships: 2 Belgian Cups
- Website: monshainaut.be

CityX Mons, formerly known as Mons-Hainaut, is a Belgian professional basketball club based in Mons, Wallonia. The club competes in the highest division of the country, the BNXT League. The club's home arena is the Mons Arena. Founded as Quaregnon in 1959, the club has been a regular in the Belgian first division as the club plays in the highest tier for 36 years, since the 1990–91 season. Mons also participated in European competitions annually, mostly in the FIBA Europe Cup.

== History ==
The club won the Belgian Cup in 2006, and reached the Belgian national league's final the same season. In 2008, Dexia Mons-Hainaut was the EuroChallenge runner-up. They won their second Belgian Cup in 2011.

Since the 2021–22 season, Mons-Hainaut plays in the BNXT League, in which the national leagues of Belgium and the Netherlands have been merged.

== Titles and honors ==
- Belgian League
  - Runners-up (6): 2005–06, 2008–09, 2010–11, 2014–15, 2019–20, 2020–21
- Belgian Cup
  - Winners (2): 2005–06, 2010–11

Runners-up (1): 2007–08

- Belgian Supercup
  - Winners (1): 2011

Runners-up (1): 2006

== Season by season ==
Season	Tier	League	Pos.	Belgian Cup	European competitions	
2008–09	1	BLB	2nd		3 EuroChallenge	T16
2009–10	1	BLB	6th	Semifinalist	2 Eurocup	RS
2010–11	1	BLB	3rd	Champion	2 Eurocup	T16
2011–12	1	BLB	4th	Semifinalist	2 Eurocup	RS
2012–13	1	BLB	2nd	Semifinalist	3 EuroChallenge	RS
2013–14	1	BLB	3rd	Quarterfinalist	2 Eurocup	RS
2014–15	1	BLB	2nd	Quarterfinalist	3 EuroChallenge	T16
2015–16	1	BLB	7th	Semifinalist	3 FIBA Europe Cup	RS
2016–17	1	BLB	7th	Quarterfinalist	4 FIBA Europe Cup	RS
2017–18	1	BLB	5th	Runner-up	4 FIBA Europe Cup	R2
2018–19	1	BLB	6th	Semifinalist	4 FIBA Europe Cup	RS
2019–20	1	BLB	2nd			
2020–21	1	BLB	2nd		4 FIBA Europe Cup	QF
2021–22	1	BNXT	BE 5th	Quarterfinalist	4 FIBA Europe Cup	RS
2021–22	1	BNXT	BNXT 8th	Quarterfinalist	4 FIBA Europe Cup	RS
2022–23	1	BNXT	BE 8th			
2022–23	1	BNXT	BNXT 13th			
2023–24	1	BNXT	BE 7th	Round of 16		
2023–24	1	BNXT	BNXT 12th	Round of 16		
2024–25	1	BNXT	BE 8th	Round of 16		
2024–25	1	BNXT	BNXT 9th	Round of 16		
2025–26	1	BNXT	BE 10th	Round of 16		
2025–26	1	BNXT	BNXT 16th	Round of 16		

== Players ==
=== Current roster ===
Note: Flags indicate national team eligibility at FIBA-sanctioned events. Players may hold other non-FIBA nationalities not displayed.

CityX Mons roster
Players
Coaches

Pos.	No.	Nat.	Name	Ht.	Age
SG	1	(France)	Nnanga, Paul	1.93 m (6 ft 4 in)	17 – 26 May 2009
PG	2	(Belgium)	Tallir, Feie	1.91 m (6 ft 3 in)	20 – 1 January 2006
SF	3	(France)	Diarra, Abdoulaye	1.90 m (6 ft 3 in)	19 – 20 May 2007
SG	7	(France)	Mpete, Kylian	1.96 m (6 ft 5 in)	19 – 12 November 2006
G	9	(Belgium)	Godimus, Sacha	1.86 m (6 ft 1 in)	20 – 9 July 2006
PG	13	(France)	Pataud, Abdoulaye	1.90 m (6 ft 3 in)	17 – 9 February 2009
F	21	(Belgium)	Boukichou, Younes	1.93 m (6 ft 4 in)	22 – 22 February 2004
C	22	(France)	Diop, Babacar	2.10 m (6 ft 11 in)	26 – 2 August 2000
G/F	27	(Belgium)	Katki, Fortune	1.97 m (6 ft 6 in)	19 – 24 November 2006
PG	88	(France)	Wade, Marvyn	1.90 m (6 ft 3 in)	17 – 17 November 2008

Head coach

- (Belgium) Frank De Meulemeester

Assistant coach(es)

- (Belgium) Yves Defraigne

Legend

- (C) Team captain
- Injured

- Roster
Updated: October 13, 2026

=== Notable players ===
Note: Flags indicate national team eligibility at FIBA-sanctioned events. Players may hold other non-FIBA nationalities not displayed.

Criteria

To appear in this section a player must have either:

- Set a club record or won an individual award while at the club
- Played at least one official international match for their national team at any time
- Played at least one official NBA match at any time.

- (Belgium) Ronny Bayer
- (Belgium) Lionel Bosco
- (Belgium) Jean-Marc Jaumin
- (Finland) Max Besselink
- (Montenegro) Omar Cook
- (United Kingdom) Nate Reinking
- (Lithuania) Evaldas Jocys
- (United States) Brandon Costner
- (United States) George Evans
- (United States) Sean Singletary
- (United States) Jerel McNeal
- (United States) Justin Gray

== Head coaches ==
- (United States) Chris Finch (2007–2009)
- (Israel) Arik Shivek (2009–2012)
- (Belgium) Yves Defraigne (2012–2017)
- (Bosnia and Herzegovina) Vedran Bosnić (2019–2025)
- (Belgium) Frank De Meulemeester (2025–Present)

== Arena ==
Home games are played in Mons.Arena, where there is place for 3,700 people per game.

== Sponsorship naming and logos ==
Due to sponsorship reasons, the team has been known as:

- Dexia Mons-Hainaut (2001–2012)
- Belfius Mons-Hainaut (2012–2024)
- Union Mons-Hainaut (2024–2026)
- CityX Mons (2026–)
Union Mons-Hainaut (2024-2026)
