= 2023–24 LPB season =

91st season of the premier Portuguese basketball league

Liga Betclic^{1}
- Season: 2023–24
- Games played: 151
- Teams: 12

Regular season
- Top seed: FC Porto
- Relegated: Portimonense Viva Portimão; Lusitânia Expert

Finals
- Champions: SL Benfica (30th title)
- Runners-up: FC Porto
- Semifinalists: UD Oliveirense; Ovarense GAVEX
- ^{1} Sponsored league name, referring to Betclic.

The 2023–24 LPB season, also known as Liga Betclic for sponsorship reasons, was the 91st season of the premier Portuguese basketball league and the 16th season under the current Liga Portuguesa de Basquetebol (LPB) format. It started on 23 September 2023 with the regular season and ended on 10 June 2024 with the final.

SL Benfica defended successfully the crown to won their third consecutive Portuguese title (30th overall) against FC Porto.

== Teams ==
=== Promotion and relegation (pre-season) ===
A total of 12 teams contested the league, including 10 sides from the 2022–23 season and two promoted from the Proliga.

Teams promoted from Proliga

- AD Galomar
- Portimonense Viva Portimão

=== Venues and locations ===
Location of teams in 2023–24 LPB
Location of teams in 2023–24 LPB (Madeira)
Location of teams in 2023–24 LPB (Azores)

Team	Home city	Arena
AD Galomar	Caniço	Pavilhão do Caniço
CD Póvoa ESC ONLINE	Póvoa de Varzim	Pavilhão do Clube Desportivo Póvoa
Esgueira Aveiro OLI	Esgueira	Pavilhão Clube do Povo de Esgueira
FC Porto	Porto	Dragão Arena
Imortal LUZiGÁS	Albufeira	Pavilhão Desportivo de Albufeira
Lusitânia EXPERT	Angra do Heroísmo	Pavilhão Municipal de Angra do Heroísmo
Ovarense GAVEX	Ovar	Arena de Ovar
Portimonense Viva Portimão	Portimão	Pavilhão Desportivo da Boavista
SL Benfica	Lisbon	Pavilhão Fidelidade
Sporting CP	Lisbon	Pavilhão João Rocha
UD Oliveirense	Oliveira de Azeméis	Pavilhão Dr. Salvador Machado
Vitória SC	Guimarães	Pavilhão Unidade Vimaranense

== Regular season ==
=== League table ===
Pos	Team	Pld	W	L	PF	PA	PD	Pts	Qualification or relegation
1	FC Porto	22	18	4	1951	1655	+296	40	Qualification to play-offs
2	SL Benfica	22	18	4	2000	1529	+471	40	Qualification to play-offs
3	UD Oliveirense	22	16	6	1793	1648	+145	38	Qualification to play-offs
4	Sporting CP	22	15	7	1967	1758	+209	37	Qualification to play-offs
5	Ovarense GAVEX	22	14	8	1793	1741	+52	36	Qualification to play-offs
6	CD Póvoa ESC ONLINE	22	12	10	1806	1854	−48	34	Qualification to play-offs
7	Vitória SC	22	11	11	1779	1749	+30	33	Qualification to play-offs
8	Imortal LUZiGÁS	22	8	14	1719	1861	−142	30	Qualification to play-offs
9	Esgueira Aveiro OLI	22	7	15	1635	1859	−224	29	
10	AD Galomar	22	6	16	1634	1787	−153	28	
11	Portimonense Viva Portimão	22	6	16	1573	1760	−187	28	Relegation to Proliga
12	Lusitânia EXPERT	22	1	21	1598	2047	−449	23	Relegation to Proliga

Source: FPB

== Play-offs ==
Quarter-finals
1	FC Porto	90	82	2
8	Imortal LUZiGÁS	71	66	0
4	Sporting CP	81	91	0
5	Ovarense GAVEX	87	93	2
2	SL Benfica	81	93	2
7	Vitória SC	53	71	0
3	UD Oliveirense	78	84	78	2
6	CD Póvoa ESC ONLINE	65	85	69	1

Semi-finals
1	FC Porto	70	77	86	77	3
5	Ovarense GAVEX	73	60	83	74	1
2	SL Benfica	100	91	77	3
3	UD Oliveirense	55	69	64	0

Final
1	FC Porto	66	62	76	0
2	SL Benfica	89	73	83	3

Source: FPB

== Final standings ==
Pos	Team	Pld	W	L	Qualification or relegation
1	SL Benfica (C)	30	26	4	Qualification to Champions League qualifying rounds
2	FC Porto	31	23	8	Qualification to FIBA Europe Cup regular season
3	UD Oliveirense	28	18	10	
4	Ovarense GAVEX	28	17	11	
5	Sporting CP	24	15	9	Qualification to FIBA Europe Cup qualifying rounds
6	CD Póvoa ESC ONLINE	25	13	12	
7	Vitória SC	24	11	13	
8	Imortal LUZiGÁS	24	8	16	
9	Esgueira Aveiro OLI	22	7	15	
10	AD Galomar	22	6	16	
11	Portimonense Viva Portimão (R)	22	6	16	Relegation to Proliga
12	Lusitânia EXPERT (R)	22	1	21	Relegation to Proliga

Source: FPB
(C) Champions; (R) Relegated

== Portuguese clubs in European competitions ==
Team	Competition	Progress	Result	W–L
SL Benfica	Champions League	Regular season Group G	4th of 4 teams (1–5)	4–5
SL Benfica	Champions League	Qualifying round final	Win vs. (Sweden) Norrköping Dolphins (83–73)	4–5
SL Benfica	Champions League	Qualifying round semi-finals	Win vs. (Cyprus) Petrolina AEK Larnaca (87–59)	4–5
SL Benfica	Champions League	Qualifying round quarter-finals	Win vs. (Georgia (country)) TSU Tbilisi (122–62)	4–5
FC Porto	FIBA Europe Cup	Quarter-finals	Loss vs. (Turkey) Bahçeşehir Koleji (168–142)	10–6
FC Porto	FIBA Europe Cup	Second round Group K	2nd of 4 teams (4–2)	10–6
FC Porto	FIBA Europe Cup	Regular season Group E	2nd of 4 teams (4–2)	10–6
FC Porto	FIBA Europe Cup	Qualifying tournament B	2nd of 3 teams (1–1)	10–6
Sporting CP	FIBA Europe Cup	Second round Group L	3rd of 4 teams (2–4)	4–6
Sporting CP	FIBA Europe Cup	Regular season Group A	2nd of 3 teams (2–2)	4–6
