= 2010–11 LPB season =

- League: LPB
- Sport: Basketball
- Games: 264 (regular season)
- Teams: 12
- TV partner(s): SportTV; Benfica TV

Regular season
- Season champions: FC Porto Ferpinta
- Top scorer: (United States) Riley Luettgerodt – 21.0 (Sampaense Basket)

Finals
- Champions: FC Porto Ferpinta; 11th title
- Runners-up: Sport Lisboa e Benfica
- Finals MVP: (United States) Gregory Stempin

LPB seasons
- ← 2009–10 2011–12 →

The 2010–11 LPB season was the third season of the Liga Portuguesa de Basquetebol.

== Promotion and relegation ==
Teams promoted from 2009–2010 Proliga

- Lusitânia
- CB Penafiel

Teams relegated to 2010-2011 Proliga

- Física/Riberalves
- VagosNorbainLusavouga

== Teams ==
=== Arenas and locations ===
Team	Home city	Stadium	Capacity
Académica Coimbra	Coimbra	Pavilhão Multidesportos Dr. Mário Mexia	3,000
Barreirense	Barreiro	Pavilhão Municipal Prof. Luís de Carvalho	750
CAB Madeira	Funchal	Pavilhão Clube Amigos do Basquete	
CB Penafiel	Penafiel	Pavilhão Municipal Fernanda Ribeiro	2,000
Casino Ginásio	Figueira da Foz	Pavilhão Jorge Galamba Marques	1,500
FC Porto Ferpinta	Porto	Dragão Caixa	2,007
Illiabum	Ílhavo	Pavilhão Municipal Capitão Adriano Nordeste	
S.C. Lusitânia EXPERT	Angra do Heroísmo	Pavilhão Municipal de Angra do Heroísmo	1,326
Ovarense Dolce Vita	Ovar	Arena Dolce Vita	2,400
Sampaense Basket	Oliveira do Hospital	Pavilhão Comendador Serafim Marques	
Sport Lisboa e Benfica	Lisbon	Pavilhão Império Bonança	2,400
Vitória SC	Guimarães	Pavilhão Vitória Sport Clube	1,500

=== Head coaches ===
Team	Head coach	Seasons as head coach
Académica Coimbra	(Portugal) Norberto Alves	4
Barreirense	(Spain) Arturo Alvarez^{1}	1
CAB Madeira	(Portugal) João Freitas	
CB Penafiel	(Spain) Manuel Povea	1
Casino Ginásio	(Brazil) Sérgio Salvador	
FC Porto Ferpinta	(Spain) Moncho López	2
Illiabum	(Portugal) Alexandre Pires	
S.C. Lusitânia EXPERT	(Portugal) Nuno Barroso^{2}	1
Ovarense Dolce Vita	(Portugal) Mário Leite	3
Sampaense Basket	(Portugal) João Moutinho	1
Sport Lisboa e Benfica	(Portugal) Henrique Vieira	5
Vitória SC	(Portugal) Fernando Sá	3

- ^{1} Coach António Paulo Ferreira resigned on November 17, 2010.
- ^{2} Coach Luis Brasil was sacked December 1, 2010.

== Standings ==
Clinched playoff berth
Relegated

#	Teams	GP	W	L	Pts
1	FC Porto Ferpinta	22	21	1	43
2	Sport Lisboa e Benfica	22	17	5	39
3	Académica Coimbra	22	16	6	38
4	Vitória SC	22	12	10	34
5	CB Penafiel	22	11	11	33
6	Casino Ginásio	22	10	12	32
7	Ovarense Dolce Vita	22	10	12	32
8	CAB Madeira	22	10	12	32
9	Sampaense Basket	22	9	13	31
10	S.C. Lusitânia EXPERT	22	7	15	29
11	Illiabum	22	6	16	28
12	Barreirense	22	3	19	25

== Statistical leaders ==
Season ending results

=== Points ===
Rank	Name	Team	Points	Games	PPG
1.	(United States) Riley Luettgerodt	Sampaense Basket	441	21	21,0
2.	(United States) Tyrone Curnell	Barreirense	443	22	20,1
3.	(United States) Almaad Jackson	Sampaense Basket	238	12	19,8
4.	(United States) Tommie Eddie	Vitória SC	545	30	18,2
5.	(United States) Matthew Shaw	Académica Coimbra	541	30	18,0

=== Rebounds ===
Rank	Name	Team	Rebounds	Games	RPG
1.	(United States) Kevin, Jr.	Vitória SC	195	19	10,3
2.	(Portugal) Nuno Cortez	Ovarense Dolce Vita	250	25	10,0'
3.	(United States) James Robert	S.C. Lusitânia EXPERT	107	11	9,7'
3.	(United States) Matthew Shaw	Académica Coimbra	273	30	9,1
5.	(United States) Tommie Eddie	Vitória SC	270	30	9,0

=== Assists ===
Rank	Name	Team	Assists	Games	APG
1.	(Portugal) Nuno Manarte	Ovarense Dolce Vita	173	25	6,9
1.	(Portugal) Jorge Sing	Sampaense Basket	139	22	6,3
1.	(Portugal) Daniel Monteiro	S.C. Lusitânia EXPERT	109	21	5,2'
4.	(Portugal) João Reveles	Casino Ginásio	113	23	4,9
5.	(Portugal) Miguel Minhava	Sport Lisboa e Benfica	167	35	4,8

Last updated: October 7, 2011.
Source: FPB
