= Toney Douglas =

American basketball player (born 1986)

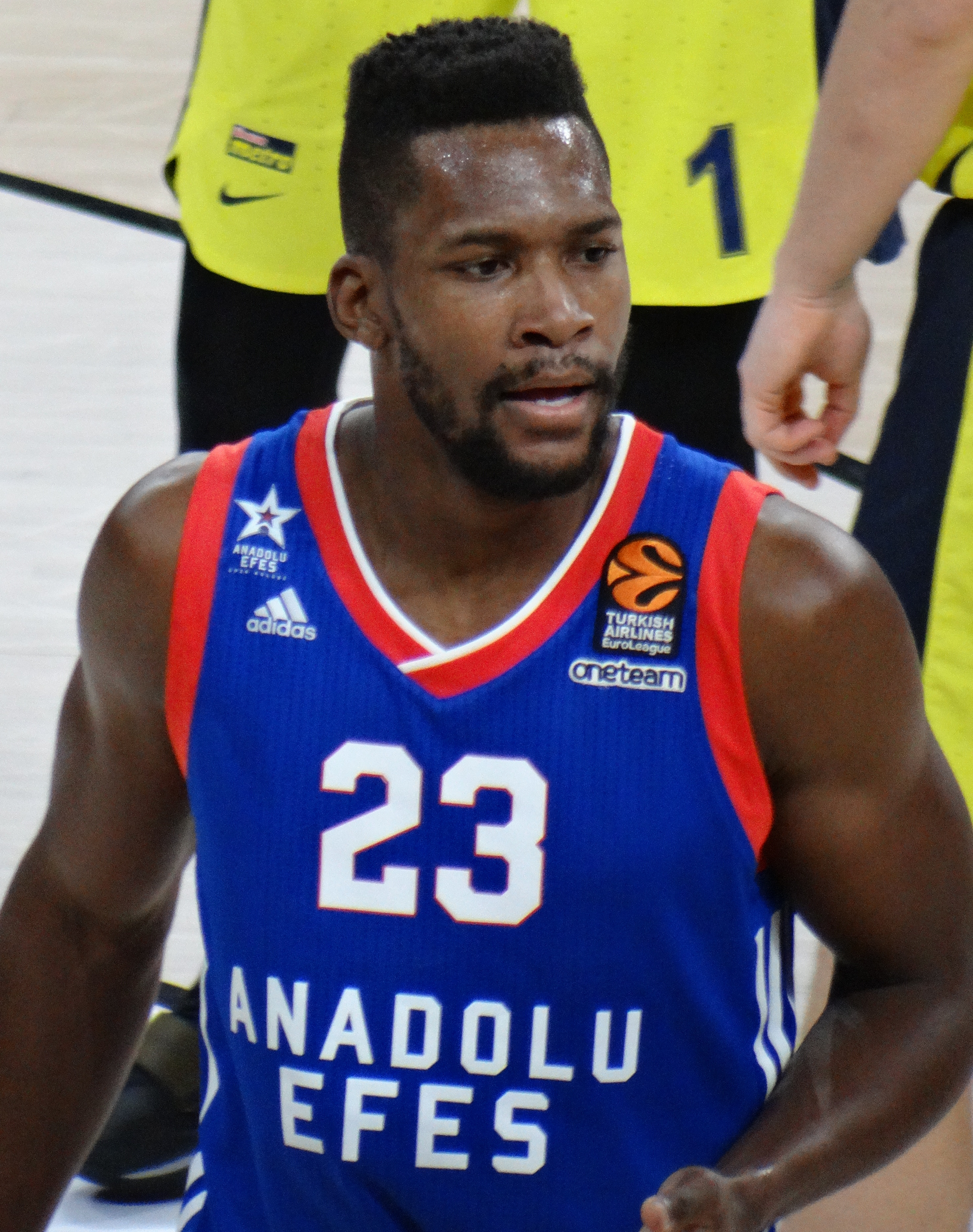
- Douglas with Anadolu Efes in 2018

No. 23 – Hapoel Galil Elyon
- Position: Point guard
- League: Israeli Basketball Premier League

Personal information
- Born: March 16, 1986 (age 40) Tampa, Florida, U.S.
- Listed height: 6 ft 2 in (1.88 m)
- Listed weight: 190 lb (86 kg)

Career information
- High school: Jonesboro (Jonesboro, Georgia)
- College: Auburn (2004–2005); Florida State (2006–2009)
- NBA draft: 2009: 1st round, 29th overall pick
- Drafted by: Los Angeles Lakers
- Playing career: 2009–present

Career history
- 2009–2012: New York Knicks
- 2012–2013: Houston Rockets
- 2013: Sacramento Kings
- 2013–2014: Golden State Warriors
- 2014: Miami Heat
- 2014–2015: Jiangsu Dragons
- 2015–2016: New Orleans Pelicans
- 2016–2017: Memphis Grizzlies
- 2017–2018: Anadolu Efes
- 2018: Sakarya
- 2018–2019: Darüşşafaka
- 2019–2020: Estudiantes
- 2020–2021: Varese
- 2021–2022: Iraklis Thessaloniki
- 2022: Hapoel Eilat
- 2022–2024: Benfica
- 2024–2025: FC Porto
- 2025–present: Hapoel Galil Elyon

Career highlights
- 2× Portuguese League champion (2023, 2024); 2× Portuguese Cup winner (2023, 2025); Portuguese League Cup winner (2024); 2× Portuguese Supercup winner (2023, 2024); Turkish Cup winner (2018); Third-team All-American – AP, SN (2009); ACC Defensive Player of the Year (2009); First-team All-ACC (2009); Third-team All-ACC (2008); 2× ACC All-Defensive Team (2008, 2009); Third-team All-SEC (2005); SEC All-Freshman Team (2005); Fourth-team Parade All-American (2004)
- Stats at NBA.com
- Stats at Basketball Reference

Toney Bernard Douglas (born March 16, 1986) is an American professional basketball player for Hapoel Galil Elyon of the Israeli Basketball Premier League.

He played college basketball for the Auburn Tigers, and the Florida State Seminoles. Douglas was drafted by the Los Angeles Lakers in the 2009 NBA draft with the 29th overall pick, but was immediately traded to the New York Knicks. He played for the Knicks, Houston Rockets, Sacramento Kings and the Golden State Warriors before being traded to the Miami Heat in 2014. After spending the 2014–15 season in China with the Jiangsu Dragons, he returned to the NBA in 2015, joining the New Orleans Pelicans.

He played college basketball for the Auburn Tigers for one year, eventually becoming frustrated with his role on the team as a shooting guard. He subsequently transferred to the Florida State Seminoles for the remainder of his collegiate career, switching to the point guard position. Emerging as a defensive force in his junior season, Douglas set school and conference records for steals. He stepped up as a team leader in his final season, breaking personal records in several statistical categories and helped lead the Seminoles to their first NCAA tournament in 11 years.

== Early life ==
Douglas was born to Harry and Stephanie Douglas in Tampa, Florida, but moved to Jonesboro, Georgia with his parents as a youth. He attended Jonesboro High School, where he was starter for its basketball team for three years. Douglas played alongside his brother, Harry, for the same amount of time. He spent most of his freshman season (2000–01) on the junior varsity team. In the 2001–02 season, when he was made a starter, Douglas averaged 21.5 points, 6.5 rebounds, and 4.0 assists per game, and became the first sophomore to earn first-team honors at the all-region and all-state levels. In his junior season, Douglas averaged 28.5 points, 7.5 rebounds, and 4.0 assists per game, scoring 20 points or more 24 times. He was named the Georgia Class 5A Player of the Year, and helped lead the team to the championship game of the state playoffs.

Douglas averaged 34 points per game as a senior, and the team advanced as far as the state semifinals. He departed Jonesboro High as Clayton County's leading scorer, with 2,404 points. He was subsequently named fourth-team Parade All-American and earned a McDonald's All-American nomination. Considered a four-star recruit by Rivals.com, Douglas was listed as the No. 14 shooting guard and the No. 66 player in the nation in 2004.

== College career ==
=== Auburn ===
Douglas committed to Auburn University during his junior year of high school. Playing as the starting shooting guard in his freshman season (2004–05), he led the team in scoring at 16.9 points per game (5th in the SEC), with a .424 field goal percentage (10th in the SEC) and .789 free throw percentage (7th), and scored a team season-high (as well as career high) 38 points against Nicholls State. Douglas, who had the second-highest freshman scoring average in the nation, was voted to the All-Southeastern Conference (SEC) Freshman Team, third-team Freshman All-America, and third-team All-SEC—he was the fourth Auburn freshman to be named to the latter.

=== Transfer ===
Douglas submitted his name for the NBA draft in the 2005 offseason, but did not sign with an agent, which allowed him to remain eligible for college when he later withdrew from the process. Despite Douglas' success at Auburn, he and his family were unhappy with his position on the basketball team. Douglas wanted to be the team's point guard, which he believed was his more natural position and the one he would play in the NBA. However, team management did not accede to his request, prompting him to request a transfer. Then-coach Jeff Lebo granted Douglas his scholarship release on the condition that he transfer to a non-SEC university.

=== Florida State ===
On June 29, 2005, Douglas enrolled at Florida State University, where coach Leonard Hamilton allowed him to play point guard. Because National Collegiate Athletic Association (NCAA) rules stipulate that players who transfer must sit out the following season, Douglas only began playing with the team in the 2006–07 season, though he practiced with them during 2005–06.

==== Sophomore year ====
Douglas initially struggled at the point guard position while adjusting to the Florida State offense, but continued to play well in other respects. The early part of his sophomore season was highlighted by his shot block that helped to seal an upset victory against the then-fourth-ranked University of Florida Gators, and a late-game period against Wake Forest in which he scored 10 consecutive points, leading Florida State to a win. On February 7, 2007, Douglas injured the fourth metacarpal in his right (shooting) hand, forcing him to sit out six games (nearly a month)—of which Florida State lost five.

In his first game (against the University of Miami) after sustaining his injury, Douglas scored 13 points, including a three-pointer that tied the game and forced overtime; Florida State went on to win the game. Douglas finished the season with averages of 12.7 points, 2.9 assists, and 2.7 rebounds per game. In three games of the 2007 National Invitation Tournament (NIT), he averaged 11.7 points and 3.7 rebounds, as Florida State won twice before losing to Mississippi State University in the semifinals.

==== Junior year ====
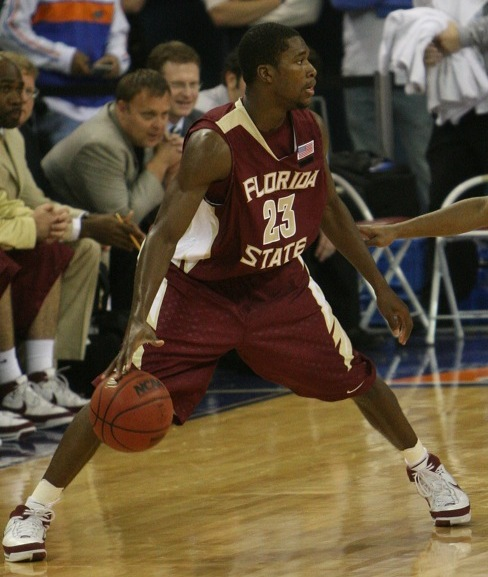
Douglas in 2007

In his junior season, Douglas continued his transition to point guard, creating offensive opportunities for others on the team in addition to scoring by himself. Although he still needed to work on polishing the distribution aspect of his game, coach Hamilton said in January 2008 that "he's done an exceptional job when you take into consideration this hasn't been his role prior to coming to Florida State." Douglas' defense improved considerably; he accumulated 2.6 steals per game (7th in the SEC) as a junior (compared to 1.2 steals in the previous season), the highest rate in the ACC. His total of 48 steals in 16 games against ACC teams was the third-highest in league history. He averaged 15.4 points per game (9th), with an .809 free throw percentage (8th). In a game against the University of Virginia, Douglas' steal in the final minute (his sixth of the game) and subsequent free throws carried Florida State to a win that helped their chances of being selected to the 2008 NCAA tournament.

After the regular season concluded, Douglas was selected into the ACC All-Defensive Team and the All-ACC Third Team. Despite Douglas' efforts (18 points, 5 assists, and 3 steals) against North Carolina in the quarterfinals, Florida State lost the game, effectively shutting them out from the NCAA tournament. After Florida State lost in the first round of the 2008 NIT, Douglas finished the season with 90 steals, second only to Sam Cassell in the number of steals made in one season (97). He led the team in scoring (15.4 ppg), steals (2.6 spg; also highest in the ACC), and assists (2.6).

==== Senior year ====
The 2008–09 Florida State team was composed of mostly freshman and sophomores, which meant that the veteran Douglas, now a senior (one of three on the team), featured more prominently in the offense than in previous years. He started all 35 games of the season, one of two Seminole players to do so. Douglas became the primary threat on offense, and was the sole top scorer for the team in 23 games. His scoring average increased by more than six points, to 21.5 points per game, which was the highest average on the team and in the ACC as he led the ACC as well with 751 total points; he also averaged 2.9 assists, a team and career high, 1.8 steals (5th), and 3.9 rebounds, as well as an .810 free throw percentage (10th(. He earned ACC All-Defensive Team honors again and was selected to the All-ACC First Team. His other major honors included being named the ACC Defensive Player of the Year, receiving the second-most votes for ACC Player of the Year and his selection to the Associated Press' All-America Third Team.

Douglas' strong play in the ACC tournament, in which the Seminoles upset top-ranked North Carolina and advanced to their first ACC final, led to his selection to the ACC All-Tournament team, another first for a Florida State player. The Seminoles made their first appearance in the NCAA tournament in 11 years, playing against the University of Wisconsin. Douglas played well, scoring 26 points, but he missed an important three-point attempt late in the game and had Trévon Hughes score the winning shot while defending him. Wisconsin won 61–59 in overtime, thus ending Douglas' collegiate career.

== Professional career ==
=== New York Knicks (2009–2012) ===
In preparation for the 2009 NBA draft, Douglas worked out at the NBA draft combine during May 28–29, and participated in pre-draft workouts with ten teams.

On June 25, 2009, Douglas was selected by the Los Angeles Lakers with the 29th overall pick in the 2009 NBA draft, making him the first Seminole guard to be drafted in the first round since Bob Sura (1995). Later that night, the New York Knicks acquired the rights to Douglas in exchange for a second-round draft pick in 2011 and $3 million in cash considerations. He signed with the Knicks on July 9, 2009 and averaged a team-high 7.0 assists per game during the NBA Summer League.

During the 2009–10 season, Douglas was a reserve guard, and averaged 8.6 points, 2.0 assists, and 0.8 steals per game, while shooting .458 from the field and .809 from the free throw line.

In 2010-11, he averaged 10.6 points, 3.0 assists, and 1.1 steals per game. He scored a career-high 30 points in a win against the Chicago Bulls on November 4, 2010. On March 17, 2011, Douglas tied a Knicks record with nine three-pointers in a home win against the Memphis Grizzlies.

In 2011-12 he saw less time on the court, and averaged 6.2 points, 2.0 assists, and 0.8 steals per game, while shooting .846 from the free throw line.

=== Houston Rockets (2012–2013) ===
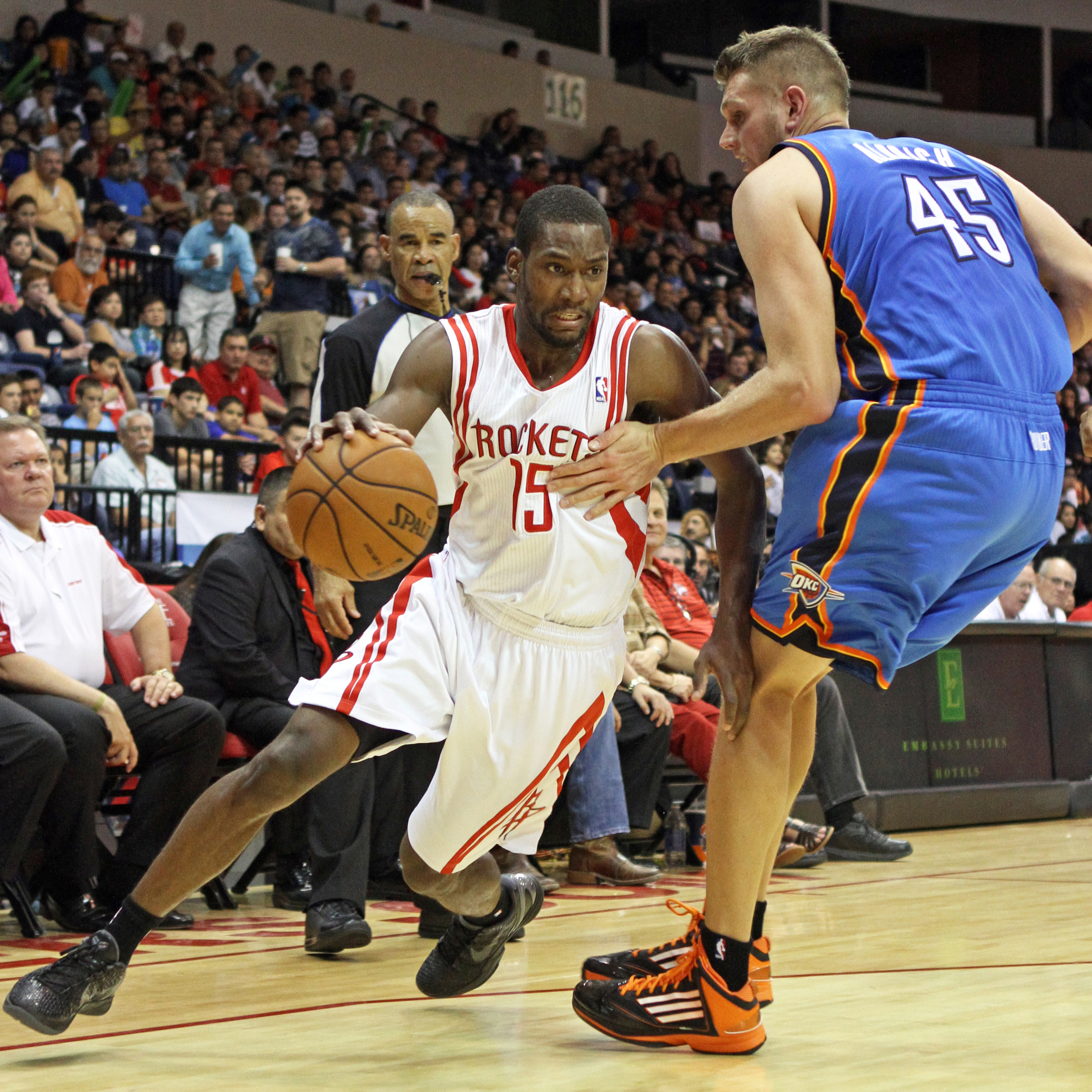
Douglas with the Houston Rockets in 2012

On July 11, 2012, Douglas was traded, along with Josh Harrellson, Jerome Jordan, two future second-round draft picks and cash considerations, to the Houston Rockets in exchange for Marcus Camby. His best game as a Rocket came on December 4, 2012, when he scored a season-high 22 points against the Los Angeles Lakers. In 2012-13 with the team he averaged 7.5 points, 2.1 assists, and 1.0 steals per game, while shooting .882 from the free throw line.

=== Sacramento Kings (2013) ===
On February 20, 2013, Douglas was traded, along with Cole Aldrich and Patrick Patterson, to the Sacramento Kings in exchange for Thomas Robinson, Francisco García and Tyler Honeycutt. In 2013 with the team he averaged 6.1 points, 2.6 assists, and 1.4 steals per game, while sinking all of his foul shots.

=== Golden State Warriors (2013–2014) ===
On July 18, 2013, Douglas signed with the Golden State Warriors. He made 24 appearances for the franchise, averaging 11 minutes per game in a limited bench role. Throughout his brief tenure, he struggled with his accuracy, shooting only 37.2% from the field.

=== Miami Heat (2014) ===
On January 15, 2014, Douglas was traded to the Miami Heat in a three-team deal involving the Warriors and the Boston Celtics. The Heat made their fourth straight appearance in the NBA Finals in 2014, but lost the series in five games to the San Antonio Spurs.

=== China (2014–2015) ===
On August 19, 2014, Douglas signed a one-year deal with the Jiangsu Dragons of the Chinese Basketball Association. On February 1, 2015, he terminated his contract with Jiangsu following the conclusion of the regular season. He appeared in 35 games while averaging 24.9 points, 4.8 rebounds, 3.3 assists, and 2.1 steals (7th in the league) per game.

=== New Orleans Pelicans (2015–2016) ===
On February 4, 2015, Douglas signed a 10-day contract with the New Orleans Pelicans. On February 18, he signed a second 10-day contract with the Pelicans. However, the next day, he was waived by the Pelicans. He returned to the Pelicans on March 24, signing with the team for the rest of the season. On July 31, he was waived again by the Pelicans. In 2015-16 with the team he averaged 8.7 points, 2.6 assists, and 1.1 steals per game, while shooting .848 from the free throw line.

On August 11, 2015, Douglas signed with the Indiana Pacers. However, he was waived by the Pacers on October 26 after appearing in five preseason games. Four days later, he re-signed with the Pelicans. On March 31, 2016, he recorded 20 points and a season-high 10 assists in a 101–95 win over the Denver Nuggets. On July 12, 2016, he was waived by the Pelicans.

=== Memphis Grizzlies (2016–2017) ===
On October 3, 2016, Douglas signed with the Cleveland Cavaliers. However, he was later waived by the Cavaliers on October 15 after appearing in five preseason games. On December 5, 2016, he signed with the Memphis Grizzlies to help the team deal with numerous injuries. Memphis had to use an NBA hardship exemption in order to sign him as he made their roster stand at 16, one over the allowed limited of 15. He appeared in six games for the Grizzlies before he was waived by the team on December 15. On January 30, 2017, he signed a 10-day contract with the Grizzlies. He went on to sign a second 10-day contract with the Grizzlies on February 9, and then a rest-of-season contract on February 23. On March 18, 2017, Douglas was again waived by the Grizzlies.

=== Turkey (2017–2019) ===
==== Anadolu Efes (2017–2018) ====
On December 29, 2017, Douglas signed with Turkish club Anadolu Efes for the rest of the 2017–18 season. Douglas helped Anadolu Efes to win the 2018 Turkish Cup . In 2017-18 with the team he averaged 8.8 points, 2.1 assists, and 0.4 steals per game, while shooting .852 from the free throw line.

==== Sakarya (2018) ====
On August 6, 2018, Douglas signed with Sakarya BB of the Turkish Basketbol Süper Ligi (BSL). In 15 games played for Sakarya, Douglas averaged 15.4 points, 4.6 rebounds, 6.6 assists and 2.3 steals per game.

==== Darüşşafaka (2018–2019) ====
On December 5, 2018, Douglas parted ways with Sakarya and signed with Darüşşafaka for the rest of the season.

=== Spain & Italy (2019–2021) ===
On November 26, 2019, Douglas signed with Movistar Estudiantes of the Spanish Liga ACB. On February 21, 2020, after he played in 11 games, he and the team parted ways.

On March 2, 2020, Douglas signed with Varese of the Italian Lega Basket Serie A. In that period the Italian team was looking to replace Jason Clark who quit before the end of the season. In 26 games during the 2020–2021 season, Douglas averaged 14.7 points, 4.3 rebounds, 4.9 assists, and 1.2 steals per contest.

=== Greece (2021–2022) ===
On August 21, 2021, Douglas signed with Greek club Iraklis Thessaloniki. In 18 league, cup, and European competition matches, he averaged 16 points, 5.5 rebounds, 4.5 assists, and 2 steals, playing 32 minutes per contest.

=== Israel (2022) ===
On January 22, 2022, Douglas signed with Israeli club Hapoel Eilat for the rest of the season. In 13 games, Douglas averaged 17.9 points (2nd in the league), 3.5 assists, and 1.7 steals (3rd) per contest, with a .429 three-point percentage (leading the league) and a .500 field goal percentage (5th).

=== Benfica (2022–2024) ===
On August 14, 2022, Douglas signed with Benfica of the Liga Portuguesa de Basquetebol. In 2022-23, in 47 games, Douglas averaged 13.2 points, 3.7 assists, and 1.7 steals per contest, with a .408 three-point percentage.

In 2023-24, in 38 games, Douglas averaged 10.1 points, 3.0 assists, and 1.8 steals per contest, with an .808 three-point percentage.

=== FC Porto (2024–25) ===
On August 9, 2024, Douglas signed with FC Porto also of the Liga Portuguesa de Basquetebol. In 2024-25, in 41 games, Douglas averaged 12.6 points, 4.2 assists, and 1.6 steals per contest, with an .840 free throw percentage.

=== Israel (2025–present) ===
On October 10, 2025, Douglas signed with Bnei Herzelia of the Israeli Basketball Premier League. He played seven games with the team before switching to another Israeli team.

Playing for Hapoel Galil Elyon of the Israeli Basketball Premier League in 2025-26, in 20 games he averaged 7.7 points, 1.6 assists, and 0.6 steals per contest.

== Career statistics ==
Legend
GP	Games played	GS	Games started	MPG	Minutes per game
FG%	Field goal percentage	3P%	3-point field goal percentage	FT%	Free throw percentage
RPG	Rebounds per game	APG	Assists per game	SPG	Steals per game
BPG	Blocks per game	PPG	Points per game	**Bold**	Career high

=== NBA ===
==== Regular season ====
Year	Team	GP	GS	MPG	FG%	3P%	FT%	RPG	APG	SPG	BPG	PPG
2009–10	New York	56	12	19.4	**.458**	.389	.809	1.9	2.0	.8	.1	8.6
2010–11	New York	**81**	9	**24.3**	.416	.373	.794	**3.0**	**3.0**	1.1	.0	**10.6**
2011–12	New York	38	9	17.3	.324	.231	.846	1.9	2.0	.8	.0	6.2
2012–13	Houston	49	0	18.6	.395	.377	.882	1.8	1.9	.8	.0	8.1
2012–13	Sacramento	22	0	17.1	.430	.389	**1.000**	2.2	2.6	**1.4**	.0	6.1
2013–14	Golden State	24	0	11.0	.372	.322	.625	1.0	.8	.3	.1	3.7
2013–14	Miami	27	17	15.2	.394	.279	.769	2.3	1.8	.5	.1	4.2
2014–15	New Orleans	12	0	14.8	.373	.278	.615	1.8	2.0	.9	**.3**	4.3
2015–16	New Orleans	61	**18**	20.7	.411	**.399**	.848	2.3	2.6	1.1	.1	8.7
2016–17	Memphis	24	0	16.4	.368	.167	.828	2.5	2.3	.7	.2	4.8
Career		394	65	19.1	.404	.354	.824	2.2	2.2	.8	.1	7.6

==== Playoffs ====
Year	Team	GP	GS	MPG	FG%	3P%	FT%	RPG	APG	SPG	BPG	PPG
2011	New York	4	**3**	**28.0**	.366	.389	**1.000**	**3.3**	**2.3**	**.5**	.0	**10.8**
2012	New York	1	0	8.0	**1.000**	.000	.000	.0	1.0	.0	.0	2.0
2014	Miami	**10**	0	2.9	.333	**.500**	.500	.4	.5	.0	.0	1.0
Career		15	3	9.9	.373	.417	.875	1.1	1.0	.1	.0	3.7

=== EuroLeague ===
Year	Team	GP	GS	MPG	FG%	3P%	FT%	RPG	APG	SPG	BPG	PPG	PIR
2017–18	Anadolu Efes	14	6	18.0	.419	.417	.852	2.0	2.0	.6	.0	7.8	6.6
Career		14	6	18.0	.419	.417	.852	2.0	2.0	.6	.0	7.8	6.6

== Personal life ==
Douglas' brother, Harry, is a former wide receiver who played ten seasons with the Atlanta Falcons and Tennessee Titans of the National Football League (NFL). In 2009, the Douglases became only the sixth set of brothers to play in the NBA and NFL.

== See also ==
- 2009 NCAA Men's Basketball All-Americans
