= 2022–23 LPB season =

90th season of the premier Portuguese basketball league

Liga Betclic^{1}
- Season: 2022–23
- Games played: 211
- Teams: 12

Regular season
- Relegated: CAB Madeira; Sangalhos Boomerang

Finals
- Champions: SL Benfica (29th title)
- Runners-up: Sporting CP
- Semifinalists: FC Porto; Ovarense GAVEX
- ^{1} Sponsored league name, referring to Betclic.

The 2022–23 LPB season, also known as Liga Betclic for sponsorship reasons, was the 90th season of the premier Portuguese basketball league and the 15th season under the current Liga Portuguesa de Basquetebol (LPB) format. It started on 24 September 2022 with the regular season and ended on 11 June 2023 with the final.

SL Benfica defended successfully the crown to won their 29th title against city rivals Sporting CP.

== Teams ==
=== Promotion and relegation (pre-season) ===
A total of 12 teams contested the league, including 10 sides from the 2021–22 season and two promoted from the Proliga.

Teams promoted from Proliga

- Esgueira Aveiro OLI
- Sangalhos Boomerang

=== Venues and locations ===
Location of teams in 2022–23 LPB
Location of teams in 2022–23 LPB (Madeira)
Location of teams in 2022–23 LPB (Azores)

Team	Home city	Arena
CAB Madeira	Funchal	Pavilhão do CAB
CD Póvoa ESCOnline	Póvoa de Varzim	Pavilhão do Clube Desportivo Póvoa
Esgueira Aveiro OLI	Esgueira	Pavilhão Clube do Povo de Esgueira
FC Porto	Porto	Dragão Arena
Imortal LuziGás	Albufeira	Pavilhão Desportivo de Albufeira
Lusitânia Expert	Angra do Heroísmo	Pavilhão Municipal de Angra do Heroísmo
Ovarense GAVEX	Ovar	Arena de Ovar
Sangalhos Boomerang	Sangalhos	Complexo Desportivo de Sangalhos
SL Benfica	Lisbon	Pavilhão Fidelidade
Sporting CP	Lisbon	Pavilhão João Rocha
UD Oliveirense	Oliveira de Azeméis	Pavilhão Dr. Salvador Machado
Vitória SC	Guimarães	Pavilhão Unidade Vimaranense

== Regular season ==
=== League table ===
Pos	Team	Pld	W	L	PF	PA	PD	Pts	Qualification
1	SL Benfica	22	19	3	2042	1669	+373	41	Qualification to Group A
2	Sporting CP	22	18	4	2020	1736	+284	40	Qualification to Group A
3	FC Porto	22	18	4	1922	1654	+268	40	Qualification to Group A
4	UD Oliveirense	22	12	10	1699	1690	+9	34	Qualification to Group A
5	Ovarense GAVEX	22	12	10	1721	1763	−42	34	Qualification to Group A
6	Lusitânia Expert	22	11	11	1780	1849	−69	33	Qualification to Group A
7	CD Póvoa ESCOnline	22	10	12	1586	1615	−29	32	Qualification to Group B
8	Imortal LuziGás	22	9	13	1684	1744	−60	31	Qualification to Group B
9	Vitória SC	22	9	13	1918	1952	−34	31	Qualification to Group B
10	Esgueira Aveiro OLI	22	8	14	1683	1831	−148	30	Qualification to Group B
11	CAB Madeira	22	5	17	1735	1889	−154	27	Qualification to Group B
12	Sangalhos Boomerang	22	1	21	1539	1937	−398	23	Qualification to Group B

Source: FPB

== Second phase ==
=== Group A ===
Pos	Team	Pld	W	L	PF	PA	PD	Pts	Qualification
1	SL Benfica	32	26	6	2981	2449	+532	58	Qualification to play-offs
2	FC Porto	32	25	7	2827	2516	+311	57	Qualification to play-offs
3	Sporting CP	32	25	7	2906	2510	+396	57	Qualification to play-offs
4	UD Oliveirense	32	18	14	2456	2491	−35	50	Qualification to play-offs
5	Ovarense GAVEX	32	14	18	2448	2606	−158	46	Qualification to play-offs
6	Lusitânia Expert	32	12	20	2486	2709	−223	44	Qualification to play-offs

Source: FPB

=== Group B ===
Pos	Team	Pld	W	L	PF	PA	PD	Pts	Qualification or relegation
7	Vitória SC	32	16	16	2847	2871	−24	48	Qualification to play-offs
8	CD Póvoa ESCOnline	32	16	16	2395	2369	+26	48	Qualification to play-offs
9	Esgueira Aveiro OLI	32	14	18	2488	2646	−158	46	
10	Imortal LuziGás	32	13	19	2518	2556	−38	45	
11	CAB Madeira	32	11	21	2549	2680	−131	43	Relegation to Proliga
12	Sangalhos Boomerang	32	2	30	2256	2754	−498	34	Relegation to Proliga

Source: FPB

== Play-offs ==
Quarter-finals
1	SL Benfica	97	93	2
8	CD Póvoa ESCOnline	46	72	0
4	UD Oliveirense	75	74	57	1
5	Ovarense GAVEX	70	82	58	2
2	FC Porto	119	112	2
7	Vitória SC	82	101	0
3	Sporting CP	99	93	2
6	Lusitânia Expert	65	73	0

Semi-finals
1	SL Benfica	88	91	115	3
5	Ovarense GAVEX	59	79	44	0
2	FC Porto	80	91	66	0
3	Sporting CP	88	93	94	3

Final
1	SL Benfica	85	87	101	101	3
3	Sporting CP	84	93	57	85	1

Source: FPB

== Final standings ==
Pos	Team	Pld	W	L	Qualification or relegation
1	SL Benfica (C)	41	34	7	Qualification to Champions League qualifying rounds
2	Sporting CP	41	31	10	Qualification to FIBA Europe Cup regular season
3	FC Porto	37	27	10	Qualification to FIBA Europe Cup qualifying rounds
4	Ovarense GAVEX	38	16	22	
5	UD Oliveirense	35	19	16	
6	Lusitânia Expert	34	12	22	
7	Vitória SC	34	16	18	
8	CD Póvoa ESCOnline	34	16	18	
9	Esgueira Aveiro OLI	32	14	18	
10	Imortal LuziGás	32	13	19	
11	CAB Madeira (R)	32	11	21	Relegation to Proliga
12	Sangalhos Boomerang (R)	32	2	30	Relegation to Proliga

Source: FPB
(C) Champions; (R) Relegated

== Portuguese clubs in European competitions ==
Team	Competition	Progress	Result	W–L
SL Benfica	Champions League	Play-ins	Loss vs. (Turkey) Darüşşafaka (0–2)	7–4
SL Benfica	Champions League	Regular season Group F	2nd of 4 teams (4–2)	7–4
SL Benfica	Champions League	Qualifying round final	Win vs. (Germany) Brose Bamberg (87–73)	7–4
SL Benfica	Champions League	Qualifying round semi-finals	Win vs. (Cyprus) Keravnos (73–65)	7–4
SL Benfica	Champions League	Qualifying round quarter-finals	Win vs. (Kosovo) Golden Eagle Ylli (92–65)	7–4
FC Porto	FIBA Europe Cup	Quarter-finals	Loss vs. (Finland) Karhu Basket (145–156)	7–7
FC Porto	FIBA Europe Cup	Second round Group I	2nd of 4 teams (4–2)	7–7
FC Porto	FIBA Europe Cup	Regular season Group C	2nd of 4 teams (3–3)	7–7
Sporting CP	FIBA Europe Cup	Regular season Group G	3rd of 4 teams (3–3)	5–3
Sporting CP	FIBA Europe Cup	Qualifying round final	Win vs. (Belgium) Telenet Giants Antwerp (98–85)	5–3
Sporting CP	FIBA Europe Cup	Qualifying round semi-finals	Win vs. (Germany) BG Göttingen (84–83)	5–3
