= Richard Oruche =

American basketball player (born 1987)

Personal information
- Born: August 30, 1987 (age 39) Oak Park, Illinois
- Listed height: 6 ft 4 in (1.93 m)
- Listed weight: 217 lb (98 kg)

Career information
- High school: Fenton (Bensenville, Illinois)
- College: Northern Illinois (2006–2007); Illinois Springfield (2008–2010)
- NBA draft: 2010: undrafted
- Playing career: 2010–2013
- Position: Shooting guard

Career history
- 2010–2011: Ginasio (Portugal)
- 2011–2012: Académica (Portugal)
- 2013: Gregorio Urbano Gilbert (Dominican Republic 2nd)
- 2013: Guaiqueríes de Margarita (Venezuela)

Richard Dean Oruche (born August 30, 1987) is an American former professional basketball player of Nigerian descent. He is 1.93 m (6 ft 4 in) tall, and he played at the shooting guard position. Oruche played with the senior men's Nigerian national basketball team. He competed at the 2012 Summer Olympics.

The 6-foot-4 guard played professional basketball in Portugal for two years. Oruche averaged 15.4 points and 3.3 rebounds with the Portuguese League Associacao Academica de Coimbra, during the 2011–12 season.

== College career ==
Oruche played college basketball at Northern Illinois University, and at the University of Illinois at Springfield. He graduated from UIS in 2010 with a degree in Business Administration and is believed to be the first UIS athlete to play in the Olympic Games. Oruche, who grew up in Bensenville, Illinois, was a scoring threat and go-to player for the 2009–2010 UIS team that went 11–13 overall and 7–11 in the Great Lakes Valley Conference. Oruche averaged team highs and led the Prairie Stars in scoring (19.8 points per game) and rebounding (5.8 rebounds per game) during the 2009–10 season, the inaugural year of Great Lakes Valley Conference GLVC membership. Oruche was the first UIS student-athlete to earn postseason accolades from the GLVC by being named second team All-GLVC. Oruche averaged 2.3 assists per game and had an 80.5 free-throw percentage. He scored in double figures in all but one game. Oruche was also the first Prairie Star student-athlete to earn the league's Player of the Week award in December 2009. He spent two seasons at Northern Illinois University as a red shirt freshman before transferring to UIS. Oruche graduated from Bensenville, Illinois, Fenton High School – located in Chicago's western suburbs. Richard Oruche is Fenton's all-time leading scorer with 1,196 points.

== Professional career ==
Oruche began his professional career in 2010 with the Portuguese League club Ginasio. In 2011, he moved to the Portuguese League club Académica. Richard Oruche (191-G-87, agency KMG Sports Management) a Nigerian-American guard, was named a top performer for Round 1 in Portugal in his first professional season with Casino Figueira Ginasio. In his first game Oruche recorded an impressive 26 points, 8 rebounds and 5 steals. Ginasio cruised to an 86–75 win over Ovarense (0–1). Oruche (191-G-87, agency KMG Sports Management) was again named number One in Portugal for Round 2, and put on an extraordinary performance in the last round for top-ranked Casino Figueira Ginasio. Oruche received the Eurobasket.com Player of the Week award for Round 2. The 23-year-old player was the main contributor (24 points, 8 rebounds and 3 assists) to his team's victory, helping Ginasio edge out Academica (#3, 1–1) 81–80. The game was between two of the league's top four teams and allowed Ginasio to consolidate first place in the Portuguese LPB.

== Nigerian national team ==
Richard Oruche is a member of the Nigerian basketball team. Oruche, whose parents are originally from Nigeria, was born in Oak Park, Illinois holds dual citizenship in Nigeria and the United States. He was invited to play with the Nigerian basketball team in 2012. The team defeated the Dominican Republic 88–73 on July 8, 2012 to earn the country's first-ever men's basketball berth of the 2012 Summer Olympics. Nigeria competed in the same men's Olympic basketball pool as Team USA. Oruche played against NBA all-stars, such as Kobe Bryant, LeBron James, Deron Williams, Andre Iguodala, and Tony Parker
