= Miguel Queiroz (basketball) =

Portuguese basketball player

No. 11 – FC Porto
- Position: Power forward
- League: Liga Betclic

Personal information
- Born: 4 July 1991 (age 35) Portimão, Faro District, Portugal
- Listed height: 204 cm (6 ft 8 in)
- Listed weight: 225 lb (102 kg)

Career history
- –2013: Barreirense Basket
- 2012–2013: Illiabum Clube
- 2013–present: FC Porto

Career highlights
- 2× Portuguese League champion (2016, 2026); 3× Portuguese Cup winner (2019, 2024, 2025); 4× Portuguese Super Cup winner (2016, 2019, 2024, 2026); 2× Portuguese League Cup winner (2016, 2021)

Miguel Queiroz (born 4 July 1991 in Portimão, Faro District, Portugal) is a Portuguese professional basketball player. He plays as a power forward for FC Porto in the Liga Betclic. He also serves as captain of both his club and the Portugal national team.

== Early life ==
He is a native of Algarve.

== Club career ==
Queiroz came through the youth ranks of Barreirense Basket before joining FC Porto in the 2013–14 season.

With FC Porto, he became a central figure of the roster, amassing over 500 games played. His contributions have included winning the 2015–16 and 2025–26 Portuguese League championships, three Portuguese Cups (2019, 2024, 2025), four Super Cups (2016, 2019, 2024, 2026) and two League Cups (2016, 2021).

== International career ==
Queiroz has been part of the Portugal national basketball team since his early twenties.

During the EuroBasket 2025 qualifiers, he stood out for his consistency and leadership. In February 2024, he recorded 21 points and 6 rebounds in a win over Ukraine, following up on a performance of 10 points and 9 rebounds against Israel.

At the EuroBasket 2025, Queiroz served as team captain.
