= 2017–18 LPB season =

Liga Portuguesa de Basquetebol
- Season: 2017–18
- Teams: 12

Regular season
- Relegated: Eléctrico Tekever; Barreirense Dif Broker

Finals
- Champions: Oliveirense (1st title)
- Runners-up: Porto

The 2017–18 LPB season was the 85th season of the premier Portuguese basketball league and the tenth season under the current Liga Portuguesa de Basquetebol (LPB) format. For sponsorship reasons, the league was also known as Liga Placard.

Benfica played as defending champions but were eliminated in the semi-finals by Porto, who in turn lost 3–0 in the final to Oliveirense, who won their first league title.

== Format ==
The competition format consisted of two stages: a regular season, comprising two phases, and the play-offs. In the first phase of the regular season, the twelve participating teams compete against each other in a double round-robin system, with home and away matches.

The second phase of the regular season comprised two groups; the six best-ranked teams at the end of the first phase competed in Group A, and the remaining six teams competed in Group B. Again, teams in each group competed against each other in a double round-robin system, with home and away matches. The six Group A teams and the two best-ranked Group B teams qualified for the play-offs, while the two worst-ranked teams in Group B were relegated to the second-tier Proliga.

The play-offs were disputed as a single-elimination tournament, with fixtures determined by each team's classification in the previous round, and comprise three knockout rounds (quarter-finals, semi-finals and finals) played in a best-of-five system.

== Teams ==
Location of teams in 2017–18 LPB season (Mainland)
Location of teams in 2017–18 LPB season (Madeira)
Location of teams in 2017–18 LPB season (Azores)

Team	City	Venue
Barreirense Dif Broker	Barreiro	Luís de Carvalho
Benfica	Lisbon	Pavilhão Fidelidade
CAB Madeira	Funchal, Madeira	Pavilhão do CAB
Eléctrico Tekever	Ponte de Sôr	Municipal
Galitos Barreiro	Barreiro	Luís Carvalho
Illiabum	Ílhavo	Capitão Adriano Nordeste
Lusitânia	Angra do Heroísmo, Azores	Municipal
Oliveirense	Oliveira de Azeméis	Dr. Salvador Machado
Ovarense Dolce Vita	Ovar	Arena Dolce Vita
Porto	Porto	Dragão Caixa
Terceira	Angra do Heroísmo, Azores	
Vitória de Guimarães	Guimarães	Pavilhão do Vitória S.C.

== First phase ==
=== League table ===
Pos	Team	Pld	W	L	PF	PA	PD	Pts	Qualification
1	Benfica	22	19	3	2019	1719	+300	41	Qualification to Group A
2	Oliveirense	22	18	4	1899	1620	+279	40	Qualification to Group A
3	Porto	22	17	5	1980	1697	+283	39	Qualification to Group A
4	CAB Madeira	22	13	9	1854	1813	+41	35	Qualification to Group A
5	Vitória de Guimarães	22	12	10	1907	1917	−10	34	Qualification to Group A
6	Illiabum	22	11	11	1823	1811	+12	33	Qualification to Group A
7	Ovarense Dolce Vita	22	10	12	1717	1715	+2	32	Qualification to Group B
8	Galitos	22	9	13	1692	1723	−31	31	Qualification to Group B
9	Terceira	22	9	13	1693	1830	−137	31	Qualification to Group B
10	Lusitânia	22	8	14	1867	1967	−100	30	Qualification to Group B
11	Barreirense Dif Broker	22	3	19	1732	1969	−237	25	Qualification to Group B
12	Eléctrico Tekever	22	3	19	1607	2009	−402	25	Qualification to Group B

Source: FPB

== Second stage ==
=== Group 1–6 ===
Pos	Team	Pld	W	L	PF	PA	PD	Pts	Qualification
1	Oliveirense	32	27	5	2793	2409	+384	59	Qualification to playoffs
2	Benfica	32	26	6	2904	2522	+382	58	Qualification to playoffs
3	Porto	32	24	8	2908	2564	+344	56	Qualification to playoffs
4	CAB Madeira	32	16	16	2648	2680	−32	48	Qualification to playoffs
5	Vitória de Guimarães	32	15	17	2809	2835	−26	47	Qualification to playoffs
6	Illiabum	32	12	20	2622	2769	−147	44	Qualification to playoffs

Source: FPB

=== Group 7–12 ===
Pos	Team	Pld	W	L	PF	PA	PD	Pts	Qualification or relegation
1	Galitos	32	16	16	2511	2457	+54	48	Qualification to playoffs
2	Lusitânia	32	16	16	2709	2739	−30	48	Qualification to playoffs
3	Ovarense Dolce Vita	32	16	16	2495	2461	+34	48	
4	Terceira	32	14	18	2431	2598	−167	46	
5	Barreirense Dif Broker (R)	32	5	27	2470	2762	−292	37	Relegation to Proliga
6	Eléctrico Tekever (R)	32	5	27	2322	2826	−504	37	Relegation to Proliga

Source: FPB
(R) Relegated

== Playoffs ==
Seeded teams played games 1, 2 and 5 at home.

Quarter-finals
Oliveirense	103	88	84
Lusitânia	94	66	48
CAB Madeira	89	84	104	76	86
Vitória de Guimarães	87	86	100	89	94
Benfica	88	75	98
Galitos	84	72	71
Porto	102	94	101
Illiabum	92	75	57

Semi-finals
Oliveirense	82	99	83
Vitória de Guimarães	70	68	63
Benfica	79	77	96	74	90
Porto	90	75	90	91	96

Final
Oliveirense	83	94	93
Porto	70	83	69
