= 2026–27 Basketball Champions League =

European basketball competition

Basketball Champions League
- Season: 2026–27

The 2026–27 Basketball Champions League will be the 11th season of the Basketball Champions League (BCL), a European professional basketball competition for clubs launched by FIBA. BC Rytas are the defending champions. The finalists of this season's Basketball Champions League will have opportunity to participate in the inaugural season of the NBA Europe.

== Team allocation ==
A total of 54 teams from 29 of the 50 FIBA Europe member associations are set to participate in the 2026–27 Basketball Champions League. The country ranking based on the country coefficients is used to determine the number of participating teams for each country:

- All countries, if they entered, each have at least one team qualify.
- The winners of the 2025–26 Basketball Champions League are given an additional entry if they do not qualify for the 2026–27 Basketball Champions League through their domestic league.
- The organizer may grant access to the League through the attribution of up to 4 invitations (wild cards) to the Regular Season or to the Qualification Rounds.
- If one or more clubs do not use their right to participate in the Basketball Champions League, the organiser may decide to allocate the respective place(s) to other clubs of the same or other country.

=== Country ranking ===
For the 2026–27 Basketball Champions League, the countries are allocated places according to their country coefficients, which takes into account their performance from 2023–24 to 2025–26.

Country ranking for 2026–27 Basketball Champions League

Rank	Country	Coeff.	Teams
1	Spain	101.20	4+1
2	Turkey	68.65	2+2
3	Greece	65.75	2+2
4	Czech Republic	65.00	2+1
5	France	62.58	3+0
6	Germany	53.25	3+2
7	Israel	52.00	2+0
8	Lithuania	50.50	2+0
9	Italy	45.25	2+0
10	Hungary	39.00	1+0
11	Latvia	27.00	0+1
12	Bosnia and Herzegovina	24.00	1+0
13	Portugal	21.00	1+1
14	Belgium	21.00	1+0
15	Serbia	20.50	1+0
16	Slovakia	20.00	0+1
17	Poland	19.00	1+1

Rank	Country	Coeff.	Teams
18	Azerbaijan	9.00	1+1
19	Estonia	7.00	0+0
20	Switzerland	6.00	0+2
21	Netherlands	5.00	0+1
22	Denmark	5.00	0+1
23	Sweden	4.00	0+0
24	Romania	4.00	0+1
25	Kosovo	4.00	0+0
26	Finland	3.00	0+1
27	Cyprus	3.00	0+1
28	Georgia	3.00	0+1
29	Bulgaria	3.00	0+1
30	Great Britain	2.00	0+1
31	Montenegro	2.00	0+0
32	North Macedonia	1.00	0+0
33	Austria	0.00	0+1
34	Croatia	0.00	1+0

=== Teams ===
The labels in the parentheses show how each team qualified for the place of its starting round:

- TH: Title holders
- FEC: FIBA Europe Cup champions
- 1st, 2nd, 3rd, 4th, etc.: League positions of the previous season

Qualified teams for 2026–27 Basketball Champions League (by entry round)
Regular season
(Spanish Basketball Federation) Asisa Joventut (3rd)	(Czech Basketball Federation) Slavia Prague ERA NBK (1st)	(Turkish Basketball Federation) Trabzonspor (6th)
(Spanish Basketball Federation) UCAM Murcia (7th)	(Czech Basketball Federation) KVIS Pardubice (2nd)	(Turkish Basketball Federation) Galatasaray MCT Technic (7th)
(Spanish Basketball Federation) Surne Bilbao (8th)^{FEC}	(Hellenic Basketball Federation) AEK (4th)	(Azerbaijan Basketball Federation) Sabah (1st)
(Spanish Basketball Federation) Unicaja (9th)	(Hellenic Basketball Federation) Peristeri Betsson (6th)	(Basketball Belgium) Windrose Giants Antwerp (1st)
(French Federation of Basketball) Nanterre 92 (3rd)	(Israeli Basketball Association) Hapoel Netanel Holon (4th)	(Basketball Federation of Bosnia and Herzegovina) Igokea m:tel (2nd)
(French Federation of Basketball) Cholet (4th)	(Israeli Basketball Association) Bnei Penlink Herzliya (5th)	(Croatian Basketball Federation) Cibona (1st)
(French Federation of Basketball) SIG Strasbourg (8th)	(Italian Basketball Federation) Pallacanestro Reggiana (6th)	(Hungarian Basketball Federation) Falco Szombathely (1st)
(German Basketball Federation) Alba Berlin (1st)	(Italian Basketball Federation) Openjobmetis Varese (9th)	(Polish Basketball Federation) Legia Warsaw (1st)
(German Basketball Federation) BMA365 Bamberg (3rd)	(Lithuanian Basketball Federation) Juventus (2nd)	(Portuguese Basketball Federation) Porto (1st)
(German Basketball Federation) Telekom Baskets Bonn (4th)	(Lithuanian Basketball Federation) Rytas (5th)^{TH}	(Basketball Federation of Serbia) Spartak Office Shoes (1st)
Qualifying rounds
(German Basketball Federation) Fitness First Würzburg Baskets (5th)	(Basketball Austria) Vienna (3rd)	(Latvian Basketball Association) VEF Rīga (4th)
(German Basketball Federation) Rasta Vechta (7th)	(Azerbaijan Basketball Federation) Absheron Lions (2nd)	(Basketball Nederland) Landstede Hammers (1st)
(Hellenic Basketball Federation) Kolossos H Hotels (8th)	(Bulgarian Basketball Federation) Rilski Sportist (3rd)	(Polish Basketball Federation) Dziki Warsaw (3rd)
(Hellenic Basketball Federation) Promitheas Patras (10th)	(Cyprus Basketball Federation) Petrolina AEK Larnaca (1st)	(Portuguese Basketball Federation) Benfica (2nd)
(Swiss Basketball) Fribourg Olympic (1st)	(Czech Basketball Federation) Opava (3rd)	(Romanian Basketball Federation) CSM CSU Raiffeisen Oradea (2nd)
(Swiss Basketball) Lions de Genève (2nd)	(Danish Basketball Association) Bakken Bears (1st)	(Slovak Basketball Association) Patrioti Levice (1st)
(Turkish Basketball Federation) Yukatel Denizli Basket (9th)	(Basketball Finland) Salon Vilpas (1st)	(Spanish Basketball Federation) Río Breogán (11th)
(Turkish Basketball Federation) Biotekno Körfez Basket (11th)	(Georgian Basketball Federation) Batumi (1st)	(British Basketball) Manchester Basketball (3rd)

== Referees ==
A total of 54 officials are set to work on the 2026–27 season in Basketball Champions League:

Referees of the 2026−27 season
(Belgium) Geert Jacobs; (Bosnia and Herzegovina) Ademir Zurapović; (Bulgaria) Martin Horozov; (Bulgaria) Ventsislav Velikov; (Croatia) Branimir Galić; (Croatia) Josip Jurčević; (Croatia) Martin Vulić; (Cyprus) Elias Kounelles; (Czech Republic) Ivor Matějek; (Estonia) Mihkel Männiste; (Estonia) Rainis Varv; (France) Edgard Ceccarelli; (France) Yann Vezo Davidson; (France) Valentin Oliot; (France) Yohan Rosso; (Greece) Ioannis Agrafiotis; (Greece) Ilias Karpanos; (Greece) Georgios Poursanidis	(Hungary) Péter Praksch; (Italy) Lorenzo Baldini; (Italy) Andrea Bongiorni; (Italy) Valerio Grigioni; (Latvia) Andris Aunkrogers; (Latvia) Elvis Binders-Coders; (Latvia) Ritvars Helmsteins; (Latvia) Mārtiņš Kozlovskis; (Latvia) Gatis Saliņš; (Lithuania) Juozas Barkauskas; (Lithuania) Gvidas Gedvilas; (Lithuania) Gintaras Mačiulis; (Norway) Gizella Viola Györgyi; (Poland) Lukasz Jankowski; (Poland) Tomasz Wit Langowski; (Poland) Wojciech Liszka; (Poland) Michał Proc; (Poland) Dariusz Zapolski	(Portugal) Julio Anaya; (Portugal) Paulo Marques; (Romania) Marius Ciulin; (Serbia) Nemanja Ninković; (Serbia) Petar Pešić; (Serbia) Siniša Prpa; (Slovakia) Zdenko Tomašovič; (Slovenia) Boris Krejić; (Slovenia) Blaž Zupančič; (Spain) Fernando Calatrava; (Spain) Luis Castillo; (Spain) Ariadna Chueca; (Spain) Antonio Conde; (Turkey) Tolga Edis; (Turkey) Orhan Cagri Hekimoglu; (Turkey) Mehmet Sahin; (Turkey) Yener Yılmaz; (Turkey) Zafer Yılmaz

== Round and draw dates ==
The schedule will be announced soon, possibly at the draw of the regular season and qualifiers.

== Qualifying rounds ==
The 24 teams will face in two qualifying round tournaments. The qualifying tournaments will take place from 14 to 20 September 2026. In the tournament "Country Representation 1" will be the eight champions and finalists from countries which are not in the regular season announced teams. In the tournament "Country Representration 2" will be the remaining 16 next best ranked teams. The winner of both qualifying tournaments will advance to the regular season of the Basketball Champions League.

=== Draw ===
The draw for the qualifying rounds was held on 8 July 2026 at the Patrick Baumann House of Basketball in Mies, Switzerland. The draw will be streamed live on the official Youtube channel of the Basketball Champions League.

==== Pots for Country Representation 1 ====
Pot 1
Team	Pts
(Slovak Basketball Association) Patrioti Levice	7
(Switzerland) Fribourg Olympic	6

Pot 2
Team	Pts
(Danish Basketball Association) Bakken Bears	5
(Romania) Raiffeisen Oradea	4

Pot 3
Team	Pts
(Cyprus Basketball Federation) Petrolina AEK Larnaca	2
(Basketball Nederland) Landstede Hammers	5.00^{†}

Pot 4
Team	Pts
(Basketball Finland) Salon Vilpas	3.00^{†}
(Georgian Basketball Federation) Batumi	3.00^{†}

Pots for Country Representation 2

Pot 1
Team	Pts
(Hellenic Basketball Federation) Promitheas	63
(German Basketball Federation) Würzburg Baskets	52
(Latvian Basketball Association) VEF Rīga	27
(Portuguese Basketball Federation) Benfica	24

Pot 2
Team	Pts
(Turkish Basketball Federation) Biotekno Körfez	24
(Spanish Basketball Federation) Río Breogán	17
(German Basketball Federation) Rasta Vechta	8
(Czech Basketball Federation) Opava	5

Pot 3
Team	Pts
(Hellenic Basketball Federation) Kolossos H Hotels	5
(Bulgarian Basketball Federation) Rilski Sportist	3
(Turkish Basketball Federation) Yukatel Denizli Basket	68.65^{†}
(Polish Basketball Federation) Dziki Warsaw	19.00^{†}

Pot 4
Team	Pts
(Azerbaijan Basketball Federation) Absheron Lions	9.00^{†}
(Swiss Basketball) Lions de Genève	6.00^{†}
(British Basketball) Manchester Basketball	2.00^{†}
(Basketball Austria) Vienna	0.00^{†}

Notes

^† Indicates teams with no club points, therefore using the country points as a tiebreaker.

=== Country Representation 1 ===
The tournament 1 will be played on September 16–20, 2026.

Quarter-finals; September 16
(Slovak Basketball Association) Patrioti Levice	87
(Basketball Finland) Salon Vilpas	90
(Danish Basketball Association) Bakken Bears	89
(Basketball Nederland) Landstede Hammers	78
(Switzerland) Fribourg Olympic	85
(Georgian Basketball Federation) Batumi	86
(Romania) Raiffeisen Oradea	95
(Cyprus Basketball Federation) Petrolina AEK Larnaca	87

Semi-finals; September 18
(Basketball Finland) Salon Vilpas	90
(Danish Basketball Association) Bakken Bears	72
(Georgian Basketball Federation) Batumi	77
(Romania) Raiffeisen Oradea	93

Final; September 20
(Basketball Finland) Salon Vilpas	98
(Romania) Raiffeisen Oradea	96

Source: FIBA

=== Country Representation 2 ===
The tournament 2 will be played on September 14–20, 2026.

Eight-finals; September 14–15
(Latvian Basketball Association) VEF Rīga	105
(Azerbaijan Basketball Federation) Absheron Lions	88
(Czech Basketball Federation) Opava	99
(Polish Basketball Federation) Dziki Warsaw	116
(German Basketball Federation) Würzburg Baskets	73
(British Basketball) Manchester Basketball	74
(Spanish Basketball Federation) Río Breogán	126
(Bulgarian Basketball Federation) Rilski Sportist	80
(Hellenic Basketball Federation) Promitheas	92
(Basketball Austria) Vienna	82
(Turkish Basketball Federation) Biotekno Körfez	91
(Hellenic Basketball Federation) Kolossos H Hotels	79
(Portuguese Basketball Federation) Benfica	87
(Swiss Basketball) Lions de Genève	78
(German Basketball Federation) Rasta Vechta	101
(Turkish Basketball Federation) Yukatel Denizli Basket	98

Quarter-finals; September 17
(Latvian Basketball Association) VEF Rīga	95
(Polish Basketball Federation) Dziki Warsaw	102
(British Basketball) Manchester Basketball	84
(Spanish Basketball Federation) Río Breogán	105
(Hellenic Basketball Federation) Promitheas	94
(Turkish Basketball Federation) Biotekno Körfez	93
(Portuguese Basketball Federation) Benfica	88
(German Basketball Federation) Rasta Vechta	98

Semi-Finals; September 19
(Polish Basketball Federation) Dziki Warsaw	113
(Spanish Basketball Federation) Río Breogán	110
(Hellenic Basketball Federation) Promitheas	73
(German Basketball Federation) Rasta Vechta	103

Final; September 20
(Polish Basketball Federation) Dziki Warsaw	82
(German Basketball Federation) Rasta Vechta	93

Source: FIBA

== Regular season ==
The regular season will be played by 32 teams divided into eight groups of four in which 30 teams receive direct spots plus the two qualifying round tournaments winners. The regular season will begin on 6 October and will conclude on 23 December 2026. In each group, teams will play against each other home-and-away in a round-robin format where the eight group winners from each regular season group will qualify directly to the round of 16. Moreover, the second-placed and third-placed will qualify to the play-ins, where the series winners will qualify for the round of 16, while the remaining last-placed teams will be eliminated after the regular season.

=== Group A ===
Pos	Team	Pld	W	L	PF	PA	PD	Pts	Qualification	NAN	VIL	TRA	SAB
1	(French Federation of Basketball) Nanterre 92	2	1	1	176	158	+18	3	Advance to round of 16	—	93–65		
2	(Lithuanian Basketball Federation) Rytas	2	1	1	147	166	−19	3	Advance to play-ins		—		82–73
3	(Turkish Basketball Federation) Trabzonspor	1	1	0	93	83	+10	2	Advance to play-ins	93–83		—	
4	(Azerbaijan Basketball Federation) Sabah	1	0	1	73	82	−9	1					—

Updated to match(es) played on October 13, 2026. Source: FIBA
Legend: Blue = home team win; Red = away team win.

=== Group B ===
Pos	Team	Pld	W	L	PF	PA	PD	Pts	Qualification	SIG	CIB	GSM	WAR
1	(French Federation of Basketball) SIG Strasbourg	1	1	0	100	62	+38	2	Advance to round of 16	—			100–62
2	(Croatian Basketball Federation) Cibona	1	1	0	96	76	+20	2	Advance to play-ins		—	96–76	
3	(Turkish Basketball Federation) Galatasaray MCT Technic	1	0	1	76	96	−20	1	Advance to play-ins			—	
4	(Polish Basketball Federation) Legia Warszawa	1	0	1	62	100	−38	1					—

Updated to match(es) played on October 6, 2026. Source: FIBA
Legend: Blue = home team win; Red = away team win.

=== Group C ===
Pos	Team	Pld	W	L	PF	PA	PD	Pts	Qualification	WGA	AEK	VIL	HOL
1	(Basketball Belgium) Windrose Giants Antwerp	1	1	0	99	93	+6	2	Advance to round of 16	—			99–93
2	(Hellenic Basketball Federation) AEK	1	1	0	95	93	+2	2	Advance to play-ins		—	95–93	
3	(Basketball Finland) Salon Vilpas	1	0	1	93	95	−2	1	Advance to play-ins			—	
4	(Hungarian Basketball Federation) Falco KC Szombathely	1	0	1	93	99	−6	1					—

First match(es) will be played: October 7, 2026. Source: FIBA
Legend: Blue = home team win; Red = away team win.

=== Group D ===
Pos	Team	Pld	W	L	PF	PA	PD	Pts	Qualification	PER	MUR	VAR	BAM
1	(Hellenic Basketball Federation) Peristeri Betsson	2	2	0	178	169	+9	4	Advance to round of 16	—			93–87
2	(Spanish Basketball Federation) UCAM Murcia	1	1	0	85	58	+27	2	Advance to play-ins		—	85–58	
3	(Italian Basketball Federation) Pallacanestro Varese	2	0	2	140	170	−30	2	Advance to play-ins	82–85		—	
4	(German Basketball Federation) BMA365 Bamberg Baskets	1	0	1	87	93	−6	1					—

Updated to match(es) played on October 13, 2026. Source: FIBA
Legend: Blue = home team win; Red = away team win.

=== Group E ===
Pos	Team	Pld	W	L	PF	PA	PD	Pts	Qualification	UNI	REG	PAR	JUV
1	(Spanish Basketball Federation) Unicaja	1	1	0	105	69	+36	2	Advance to round of 16	—			
2	(Italian Basketball Federation) Pallacanestro Reggiana	1	1	0	82	65	+17	2	Advance to play-ins		—	82–65	
3	(Czech Basketball Federation) KVIS Pardubice	1	0	1	65	82	−17	1	Advance to play-ins			—	
4	(Lithuanian Basketball Federation) Juventus Utena	1	0	1	69	105	−36	1		69–105			—

Updated to match(es) played on October 7, 2026. Source: FIBA
Legend: Blue = home team win; Red = away team win.

=== Group F ===
Pos	Team	Pld	W	L	PF	PA	PD	Pts	Qualification	SPA	CHO	HOL	VEC
1	(Basketball Federation of Serbia) Spartak Office Shoes	1	1	0	96	64	+32	2	Advance to round of 16	—			96–64
2	(French Federation of Basketball) Cholet	1	1	0	99	79	+20	2	Advance to play-ins		—		
3	(Israeli Basketball Association) Hapoel Holon	1	0	1	79	99	−20	1	Advance to play-ins		79–99	—	
4	(German Basketball Federation) Rasta Vechta	1	0	1	64	96	−32	1					—

Updated to match(es) played on October 7, 2026. Source: FIBA
Legend: Blue = home team win; Red = away team win.

=== Group G ===
Pos	Team	Pld	W	L	PF	PA	PD	Pts	Qualification	ALB	BIL	IGO	PRA
1	(German Basketball Federation) Alba Berlin	2	2	0	200	165	+35	4	Advance to round of 16	—		90–79	
2	(Spanish Basketball Federation) Surne Bilbao	1	1	0	92	79	+13	2	Advance to play-ins		—		
3	(Basketball Federation of Bosnia and Herzegovina) Igokea m:tel	2	0	2	158	192	−34	2	Advance to play-ins		79–92	—	
4	(Czech Basketball Federation) Slavia Praha ERA NBK	1	0	1	86	110	−24	1		86–110			—

Updated to match(es) played on October 13, 2026. Source: FIBA
Legend: Blue = home team win; Red = away team win.

=== Group H ===
Pos	Team	Pld	W	L	PF	PA	PD	Pts	Qualification	JOV	BON	POR	HER
1	(Spanish Basketball Federation) Asisa Joventut	1	1	0	86	75	+11	2	Advance to round of 16	—			86–75
2	(German Basketball Federation) Telekom Baskets Bonn	1	1	0	78	74	+4	2	Advance to play-ins		—	78–74	
3	(Portuguese Basketball Federation) FC Porto	1	0	1	74	78	−4	1	Advance to play-ins			—	
4	(Israeli Basketball Association) Bnei Penlink Herzliya	1	0	1	75	86	−11	1					—

Updated to match(es) played on October 7, 2026. Source: FIBA
Legend: Blue = home team win; Red = away team win.

Notes

^† Indicates teams with no club points, therefore using the country points as a tiebreaker.

== See also ==
- 2026–27 EuroLeague
- 2026–27 EuroCup Basketball
- 2026–27 FIBA Europe Cup
