= 2025–26 LPB season =

93rd season of the premier Portuguese basketball league

Liga Betclic^{1}
- Season: 2025–26
- Games played: 152
- Teams: 12

Regular season
- Top seed: SL Benfica
- Relegated: SC Vasco da Gama; Galitos BARREIRO ACEDE

Finals
- Champions: FC Porto (13th title)
- Runners-up: SL Benfica
- Semi-finalists: Sporting CP; UD Oliveirense
- ^{1} Sponsored league name, referring to Betclic.

The 2025–26 LPB season, also known as Liga Betclic for sponsorship reasons, was the 93rd season of the premier Portuguese basketball league and the 18th season under the current Liga Portuguesa de Basquetebol (LPB) format. It started on 4 October 2025 with the regular season and ended on 14 June 2026 with the final.

SL Benfica were the defending champions which was overcame in the final by FC Porto that lifted their 13th Portuguese title 10 years later since the last league achieved by the Dragons.

== Teams ==
=== Promotion and relegation (pre-season) ===
A total of 12 teams contested the league, including 10 sides from the 2024–25 season and two promoted from the Proliga.

▲ Promoted from Proliga	▼ Relegated to Proliga
SC Braga; SC Vasco da Gama	CD Póvoa ESC ONLINE; AD Galomar

=== Venues and locations ===
Location of teams in 2025–26 LPB

Team	Home city	Arena
Esgueira Aveiro OLI	Esgueira	Pavilhão Clube do Povo de Esgueira
FC Porto	Porto	Dragão Arena
Galitos BARREIRO ACEDE	Barreiro	Pavilhão Municipal Prof Luís de Carvalho
Imortal LUZiGÁS	Albufeira	Pavilhão Desportivo de Albufeira
Ovarense GAVEX	Ovar	Arena de Ovar
Queluz O NOSSO PREGO	Queluz	Pavilhão Henrique Miranda
SC Braga	Braga	AMCO Arena
SC Vasco da Gama	Matosinhos	Pavilhão Municipal de Guifões
SL Benfica	Lisbon	Pavilhão Fidelidade
Sporting CP	Lisbon	Pavilhão João Rocha
UD Oliveirense	Oliveira de Azeméis	Pavilhão Dr. Salvador Machado
Vitória SC	Guimarães	Pavilhão Desportivo Unidade Vimaranense

== Regular season ==
=== League table ===
Pos	Team	Pld	W	L	PF	PA	PD	Pts	Qualification or relegation
1	SL Benfica	22	20	2	2158	1668	+490	42	Qualification to play-offs
2	Sporting CP	22	17	5	1920	1692	+228	39	Qualification to play-offs
3	FC Porto	22	15	7	1964	1812	+152	37	Qualification to play-offs
4	Ovarense GAVEX	22	14	8	1797	1727	+70	36	Qualification to play-offs
5	UD Oliveirense	22	12	10	1878	1827	+51	34	Qualification to play-offs
6	Imortal LUZiGÁS	22	9	13	1862	1861	+1	31	Qualification to play-offs
7	Esgueira Aveiro OLI	22	9	13	1873	1993	−120	31	Qualification to play-offs
8	SC Braga	22	9	13	1755	1819	−64	31	Qualification to play-offs
9	Vitória SC	22	8	14	1831	1984	−153	30	
10	Queluz O NOSSO PREGO	22	8	14	1851	1923	−72	30	
11	SC Vasco da Gama	22	6	16	1829	2152	−323	28	Relegation to Proliga
12	Galitos BARREIRO ACEDE	22	5	17	1798	2058	−260	27	Relegation to Proliga

Source: FPB

== Play-offs ==
Quarter-finals
1	SL Benfica	90	94	2
8	SC Braga	72	79	0
4	Ovarense GAVEX	93	72	65	1
5	UD Oliveirense	79	90	69	2
2	Sporting CP	109	85	2
7	Esgueira Aveiro OLI	67	73	0
3	FC Porto	88	102	2
6	Imortal LUZiGÁS	66	79	0

Semi-finals
1	SL Benfica	98	86	86	3
5	UD Oliveirense	76	61	78	0
2	Sporting CP	70	88	76	86	1
3	FC Porto	81	73	86	94	3

Final
1	SL Benfica	89	98	63	71	1
3	FC Porto	73	102	87	75	3

Source: FPB

== Final standings ==
Pos	Team	Pld	W	L	Qualification or relegation
1	FC Porto (C)	32	23	9	Qualification to Champions League regular season
2	SL Benfica	31	26	5	Qualification to Champions League qualifying rounds
3	Sporting CP	28	20	8	Qualification to FIBA Europe Cup regular season
4	UD Oliveirense	28	14	14	
5	Ovarense GAVEX	25	15	10	
6	Imortal LUZiGÁS	24	9	15	
7	Esgueira Aveiro OLI	24	9	15	
8	SC Braga	24	9	15	
9	Vitória SC	22	8	14	
10	Queluz O NOSSO PREGO	22	8	14	
11	SC Vasco da Gama	22	6	16	Relegation to Proliga
12	Galitos BARREIRO	22	5	17	Relegation to Proliga

Source: FPB
(C) Champions

== Portuguese clubs in European competitions ==
Team	Competition	Progress	Result	W–L
SL Benfica	Champions League	Regular season Group H	4th of 4 teams (1–5)	1–5
FC Porto	Champions League	Qualifying round semi-finals	Loss vs. (French Federation of Basketball) Élan Chalon (79–100)	3–5
FC Porto	Champions League	Qualifying round quarter-finals	Win vs. (Hungarian Basketball Federation) Falco Szombathely (83–79)	3–5
FC Porto	FIBA Europe Cup	Regular season Group B	4th of 4 teams (2–4)	3–5
Sporting CP	FIBA Europe Cup	Second round Group M	3rd of 4 teams (1–5)	5–7
Sporting CP	FIBA Europe Cup	Regular season Group G	2nd of 4 teams (4–2)	5–7
