= Sangalhos DC =

Portuguese basketball club from Sangalhos

- Leagues: LPB
- Founded: 1 January 1940; 85 years ago
- Arena: Complexo Desportivo de Sangalhos
- Location: Sangalhos, Portugal
- President: Jorge Anjos
- Head coach: Emanuel Silva

Sangalhos Desporto Clube, better known as Sangalhos DC, is a Portuguese basketball club from Sangalhos. The team plays in the Liga Portuguesa de Basquetebol. Sangalhos played in the 1994–95 FIBA Korać Cup, where it was eliminated by Manchester Giants in the first round.

== Current roster ==
FC Porto roster
Players
Coaches

| Pos. | No. | Nat. | Name | Ht. | Wt. | Age |
|---|---|---|---|---|---|---|
| G | 31 | (United States) | Williams, Aaron Pervis | 1.98 m (6 ft 6 in) | 98 kg (216 lb) | 33 – 9 November 1991 |
| F | 3 | (United States) | Hunt Jr., Eddie | 2.01 m (6 ft 7 in) | 104 kg (229 lb) | 28 – 12 December 1996 |
| F | 30 | (United States) | Stovall, Justin | 2.01 m (6 ft 7 in) | 94 kg (207 lb) | 25 – 1 January 2000 |
| G | 9 | (Canada) | Kasongo, Nikita | 1.93 m (6 ft 4 in) | 90 kg (198 lb) | 29 – 1 January 1996 |
| G | 10 | (Portugal) | Martinho, Joao | 1.88 m (6 ft 2 in) | 87 kg (192 lb) | 27 – 23 June 1997 |
| F | 32 | (United States) | Hemphill, Jack | 2.06 m (6 ft 9 in) | 104 kg (229 lb) | 25 – 8 August 1999 |

Head coach

- (Portugal) Emanuel Silva

Legend

- (C) Team captain
- Injured

- Roster
Updated: 2 October 2022

Note: Flags indicate national team eligibility at FIBA-sanctioned events. Players may hold other non-FIBA nationalities not displayed.

== Honours ==
Primeira Divisão

- Champions (2): 2001–02, 2002–03

== Players ==
=== Notable players ===
- (The Bahamas) Cedric Miller
