= Barreirense Basket =

- Leagues: Campeonato Nacional da 1.ª Divisão
- Founded: 1911
- Arena: Pavilhão Municipal Luís de Carvalho
- Location: Barreiro, Portugal
- Team colors: Red & white stripes
- President: António Libório; Paulo Silvestre
- Head coach: (Portugal) carlos caetano (Portugal) José Teixeira (Portugal) José Paixão
- Championships: 1 Proliga Championship (Portugal); 2 Portuguese Championships; 6 Portuguese Cups; 28 Portuguese Youth Championships
Home	Away	Third

Barreirense Basket is the professional basketball team of F.C. Barreirense, a sports club from Barreiro, Portugal. In the 2024-2025 season, the club competed in the Proliga, the second tier of Portuguese basketball.

== Honors ==
Portuguese Championships:

- 2 Portuguese Championships (1956/1957; 1957/1958)
- 6 Portuguese Cups (1956/1957; 1959/1960; 1962/1963; 1981/1982; 1983/1984; 1984/1985)
- 1 Proliga Championship (2018/19)

Participation in European Competitions

- 12/03/1958: FC Barreirense 51-68 Real Madrid CF (Barreiro)
- 20/04/1958: Real Madrid CF 86-40 FC Barreirense (Madrid)
- ??/??/1958: Étoile de Charville 77-40 FC Barreirense (Charville)
- 22/11/1958: FC Barreirense 27-63 Étoile de Charville (Barreiro)

== Season by season ==
Season	League	Phase 1	Phase 2	Notes
2007-08	LPB	8th	Quarter-finals	Lost 3-0 to A.D. Ovarense in the quarter-finals.
2008-09	LPB	6th	Quarter-finals	Lost 3-0 to A.D. Ovarense in the quarter-finals.
2009-10	LPB	10th	—	—
2010-11	LPB	12th	—	Did not get relegated.
2011-12	LPB	4th	Quarter-finals	Lost 3-0 to CAB Madeira in the quarter-finals.
2012-13	LPB	12th	—	The club withdrew before the start of the season.
2013-14	—	—	—	—
2014-15	—	—	—	—
2015-16	Proliga	5th	6th	—
2016-17	Proliga	1st	1st	2nd place in the finals, got promoted.
2017-18	LPB	11th	—	Relegated.
2018-19	Proliga	1st	1st	Won the finals, got promoted.
2019-20	LPB	11th	—	Season was voided because of the COVID-19 pandemic.
2020-21	LPB	14th	—	Relegated.
2021-22	Proliga	2nd	5th	—
2022-23	Proliga	6th	1st	—
2023-24	—	—	—	—
2024-25	Proliga	7th	7th	Relegated.

== Current roster 2024-2025 ==
#		Name	Age	Last Club
2	(Portugal)	João Do Ó	23	Ginasio Olhanense
5	(Portugal)	Ricardo Oliveira	22	Sporting CP
7	(Portugal)	Pedro Costa	27	Galitos Barreiro
8	(Portugal)	Pedro Santos	20	S.C. Lusitânia
9	(Portugal)	Tomás Silva	20	—
11	(Portugal)	Guilherme Paixão	18	—
12	(Portugal)	Diogo Peixe	25	CAB Madeira
13	(Cape Verde)	Fabrizio Caetano	22	Sporting CP
14	(Portugal)	Daniel Margarido	32	—
15	(Portugal)	Tiago Raimundo	34	—
28	(Portugal)	Tomás Cabrita	20	—
32	(United States)	Evan Maxwell	31	—
73	(United States)	Micah Downs	38	Portimonense

== Notable players ==
- (Portugal) João Gomes
- (Portugal) Carlos Freire
- (Portugal) Mike Plowden
- (Portugal) Miguel Queiroz
- (Portugal) Eugénio Silva
- (Portugal) David Vaz
- (Portugal) Neemias Queta
- (Portugal) Zeca Macedo
- (Brazil) Adilson de Freitas Nascimento
- (Brazil) Marcelo de Vido
- (United States) Earnest Killium
- (Portugal) José Valente

== Notable coaches ==
- (Spain) Arturo Alvarez
- (Portugal) Mário Gomes
- (Spain) António Herrera
- (Portugal) Antonio Paulo
- (Portugal) José Luis Lopes
- (Portugal) José Francisco Fernandes
- (Portugal) Francisco Cabrita
- (Portugal) Manuel Fernandes
