= Mozambican Roller Hockey Championship =

- Founded: 1955
- Country: Mozambique
- Confederation: FARS
- Number of clubs: 4
- Level on pyramid: 1
- International cup: Africa Cup
- Current champions: Grupo Desportivo de Maputo (2025)
- Most championships: Grupo Desportivo de Maputo (21)

The Mozambican Roller Hockey Championship (Campeonato Moçambicano de Hóquei em Patins, Portuguese name) or Moçóquei is the top division of Mozambican Roller Hockey, and it is organized by the Mozambican Roller Sports Federation.

== Participating clubs in 2010 ==
The clubs that competed in the season of 2010 were:

- Clube Ferroviário de Maputo
- Grupo Desportivo de Maputo
- Grupo Desportivo Estrela Vermelha de Maputo
- Clube de Desportos do Maxaquene

=== List of Winners ===
- 2025: Grupo Desportivo de Maputo
- 2024: --- no championship --
- 2023: Grupo Desportivo de Maputo
- 2019: Grupo Desportivo de Maputo
- 2018: Grupo Desportivo Estrela Vermelha de Maputo
- 2017: Grupo Desportivo Estrela Vermelha de Maputo
- 2016: Grupo Desportivo Estrela Vermelha de Maputo
- 2015: Grupo Desportivo Estrela Vermelha de Maputo
- 2014: Grupo Desportivo Estrela Vermelha de Maputo
- 2013: Clube Ferroviário de Maputo
- 2012: Clube Ferroviário de Maputo
- 2011: --- no championship --
- 2010: Grupo Desportivo de Maputo
- 2009: Clube Ferroviário de Maputo
- 2008: Clube Ferroviário de Maputo
- 2007: --- no championship --
- 2006: Grupo Desportivo de Maputo
- 2005: Clube Ferroviário de Maputo
- 2004: Grupo Desportivo de Maputo
- 2003: Grupo Desportivo de Maputo
- 2002: Grupo Desportivo de Maputo
- 2001: Grupo Desportivo de Maputo
- 2000: Grupo Desportivo de Maputo
- 1999: Grupo Desportivo de Maputo
- 1998: Grupo Desportivo de Maputo
- 1997: Grupo Desportivo de Maputo
- 1996: Grupo Desportivo de Maputo
- 1995: Grupo Desportivo de Maputo
- 1994: Grupo Desportivo de Maputo
- 1993: Grupo Desportivo Estrela Vermelha de Maputo
- 1992: Grupo Desportivo Estrela Vermelha de Maputo
- 1991: Grupo Desportivo Estrela Vermelha de Maputo
- 1990: Grupo Desportivo Estrela Vermelha de Maputo
- 1989: Mabor de Moçambique
- 1988: Clube Ferroviário de Maputo
- 1987: Grupo Desportivo de Maputo
- 1986: Clube Ferroviário de Maputo
- 1985: Clube Ferroviário de Maputo
- 1984: Clube de Desportos da Costa do Sol
- 1983: Clube de Desportos da Costa do Sol
- 1982: Clube de Desportos da Costa do Sol
- 1981: Clube de Desportos da Costa do Sol
- 1980: Clube de Desportos da Costa do Sol
- 1979: Clube de Desportos da Costa do Sol
- 1978: Benfica de Lourenço Marques
- 1977: Clube Ferroviário de Lourenço Marques
- 1976: Grupo Desportivo de Lourenço Marques
- 1963: Clube Ferroviário de Lourenço Marques
- 1962: Clube Ferroviário de Lourenço Marques
- 1961: Clube Ferroviário de Lourenço Marques
- 1960: CD Malhangalene
- 1959: CD Malhangalene
- 1958: CD Malhangalene
- 1957: Clube Ferroviário de Lourenço Marques
- 1956: Clube Ferroviário de Lourenço Marques
- 1955: Clube Ferroviário de Lourenço Marques

=== Number of Championships by team ===
Teams	Championships
Grupo Desportivo de Maputo	21
Clube Ferroviário de Maputo	18
Grupo Desportivo Estrela Vermelha de Maputo	14
Clube de Desportos da Costa do Sol	7
Mabor de Moçambique	1
TOTAL	65

The total number of championships takes into account the changing of some club names after independence :

Clube Ferroviário de Maputo from Clube Ferroviário de Lourenço Marques Grupo Desportivo Estrela Vermelha de Maputo from Malhangalene Clube de Desportos da Costa do Sol from Benfica de Lourenço Marques Grupo Desportivo de Maputo from Grupo Desportivo de Lourenço Marques
