= CD Estrela Vermelha =

Football club in Mozambique

Estrela Vermelha
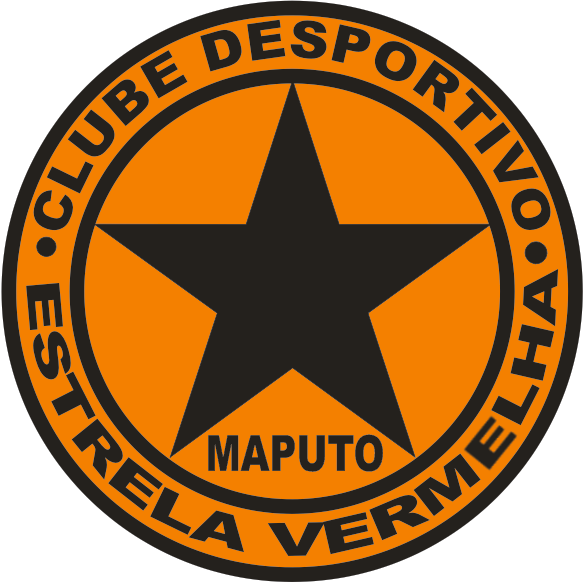
- Full name: Clube Desportivo; Estrela Vermelha da Cidade de Maputo
- Ground: Estádio da Machava; Maputo, Mozambique
- Capacity: 45,000
- Manager: Artur Aloi
- League: Moçambola
Home colours	Away colours

The Clube Desportivo Estrela Vermelha, the Red Star Sports Club, is a sports club from Maputo, the capital of the south-east African state Mozambique. It was founded during the Portuguese colonial era on 4 October 1934 as Clube Desportivo Malhangalene, deriving its name from the historic quarter of the city.

== History ==
The first emblem of the club, until c. 1960. Original colour scheme unknown.

The sports club was founded during the Portuguese colonial era on 4 October 1934 as Clube Desportivo Malhangalene, deriving its name from the historic quarter of the city of Lourenço Marques, the name of Maputo at the time. In this era the club became a branch (filial) of motherland-based club FC Porto and carried, from about 1960 onwards, the same emblem, except the initials FCP which were replaced with CDM. After the independence of Mozambique the club was briefly renamed to Centro Popular de Maputo, a name the club retained until 1978.

During its history the club had substantial success in basketball and roller hockey. The basketball team won the Championship of Portugal in 1974, the last year in which clubs from Mozambique participated in this competition due to the events resulting from the Carnation Revolution on 25 April 1974 and the subsequent declaration of independence of Mozambique from Portugal on 25 June 1975.

The roller hockey players won seven national championships: three from 1958 to 1960 and four consecutive titles from 1990 to 1993. In addition the team won the Portuguese Cup in 1964. Fernando Amaral Adrião (1939–2006), between 1958 and 1974 five times world champion, commenced his career with CD Malhangalene.

The football team has not yet won any major titles. Highlight hitherto has been the national cup final of 1986, which was lost to CD Maxaquene with 0–2. The ensuing campaign in the African Cup of Cup Winners ended in the first round with 0–1 and 0–3 defeats to Nchanga Rangers FC of Zambia.

Since the introduction of a unified national first division, the Moçambola, in 2000 the footballers of Estrela Vermelha played four seasons in the league, the sixth rank of 2007 being the highlight. Following the relegation after its first season in 2001 the club returned in 2006 to survive relegation play-offs thereafter. The last relegation followed after the 2008 season.

== Honours ==
Football

- Cup of Moçambique: finalist 1986

Basketball

- Championship of Portugal: 1974

Roller Hockey

- Championship of Moçambique: (7) 1958, 1959, 1960. 1990, 1991, 1992, 1993.
- Champions of the African Clubs Cup, in Port Said, Egypt, 1993
- Portuguese Cup: 1964
