= Pavilhão Multidesportos Dr. Mário Mexia =

Sports arena in Coimbra, Portugal

Coordinates: 40°12′19″N 8°24′30″W

Multiusos de Coimbra
- Interactive map of Multiusos de Coimbra
- Full name: Pavilhão Multidesportos Dr. Mário Mexia
- Former names: Pavilhão Multiusos de Coimbra
- Location: Coimbra, Portugal
- Owner: Coimbra
- Operator: Coimbra Academic Association
- Capacity: 2,239

Construction
- Opened: 2003

Tenants
- Basketball; Volleyball

Website
- cm-coimbra.pt

Pavilhão Multiusos de Coimbra is a multipurpose sports arena in Coimbra, Portugal adjacent to the Estádio Cidade de Coimbra stadium and the municipal swimming pools (Piscinas Municipais). Built in 2003, it is venue for Académica de Coimbra basketball team, among other teams and events. Its owner is Coimbra's City Hall and it has 2,239 seats.
