= Julian Terrell =

American basketball player & coach (born 1984)

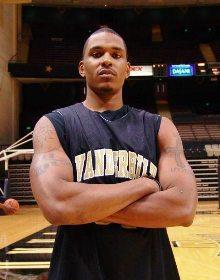
- Terrell during practice at Vanderbilt

Windy City Bulls
- Title: Assistant Coach
- League: NBA G League

Personal information
- Born: April 16, 1984 (age 42) Akron, Ohio, U.S.
- Listed height: 6 ft 9 in (2.06 m)
- Listed weight: 245 lb (111 kg)

Career information
- High school: Ezell Harding Christian School
- College: Vanderbilt (2002–2006)
- NBA draft: 2006: undrafted
- Playing career: 2006–2013
- Position: Power forward
- Coaching career: 2013–present

Career history

Playing
- 2006–2007: Artland Dragons
- 2006–2008: Arkansas RimRockers
- 2007–2008: FC Porto Ferpinta
- 2008–2009: Köln 99ers
- 2009–2011: FC Porto Ferpinta
- 2011–2012: Al Wasl SC Dubai
- 2012: Leuven Bears
- 2012: Kataja Basket Club
- 2012–2013: Sigal Prishtina

Coaching
- 2013–2015: Vanderbilt (Director of Video)
- 2015–2017: Austin Peay State University (assistant coach)
- 2017–present: Windy City Bulls (assistant coach)

Career highlights
- SEC Tournament Semifinals (2004); NCAA Sweet 16 (2004); NIT Quarterfinals (2005); Portuguese League Cup Winner (2008); Portuguese League Finalist (2008, 2010); Portuguese Hugo dos Santos Cup Winner (2010, 2011); Portuguese Cup Winner (2010); Portuguese Regular Season Champion (2011); Portuguese LPB League Champion (2011); Top 16 FIBA Eurochallenge (2012); Kosovo Cup Winner (2013); NCAA NIT Tournament 3rd Round (2015); Ohio Valley Conference Tournament Champion (2016); NCAA Tournament 1st Round (2016)
- Stats at Basketball Reference

Julian Terrell (born April 16, 1984) is an Assistant basketball coach for the Windy City Bulls. Previously he served as Assistant Men's Basketball Coach at Austin Peay State University. Prior to that he spent time at Vanderbilt University as the Director of Video Operations. He also played collegiately for Vanderbilt in Nashville, Tennessee.

== High school career ==
Terrell attended Ezell-Harding Christian School, where he played for head coach Christopher Burnette. As a junior (2000–2001), he led his high school team to school best 33–2 record. The only two losses came during the 1st game of the season and the TSSAA Class A State Championship game against future Vanderbilt teammate Jason Holwerda. His team lost by 3pts (57–54). As a senior (2001–02), he averaged 17 points, 10 rebounds and 3 blocks and led Ezell-Harding (27–5) to its second TSSAA Class A State Championship in two years. Again the Eagles lost the game, this time to Tennessee Temple 58–45. He was named first-team All-State. He was also named first-team All Mid-State. Terrell eventually signed a National Letter of Intent with Vanderbilt University and head coach Kevin Stallings.

== College career ==
Terrell signed with Vanderbilt University in November 2001. He chose Vanderbilt over the University of Alabama, University of Connecticut, University of Kentucky, and University of Tennessee due to a relationship he built with the Commodores coaching staff during the recruiting process.

As a freshman (2002–2003), Terrell played limited minutes in 29 games averaging 4.3ppg, 3.9rpg, 48.5% FG., 48.3% FT. As a sophomore (2003–2004), Terrell began the year as the starting center due to transfer of SEC All-Freshman Team member Brian Thornton. Terrell finished the season with averages: 6.4ppg, 4.2rpg, 49.7% FG, 59.5% FT in 32 games. As a junior (2004–2005), Terrell again was named a starter. Terrell finished the season with averages: 6.8ppg, 5.1rpg, 1.1bpg, 1.4asg, 50% FG, 60.5% FT in 33 games. Terrell only missed 1 game during the season due to the untimely death of his mother Rosemary Terrell. Ms. Rosemary Terrell died on January 26, 2005. A month earlier roommate and Vanderbilt University starting Running back Kwane Doster was killed on vacation in his hometown Tampa, Florida. During the Summer of 2005, Terrell traveled with the USA All-Star team to play in the Nationen Cup in Münster, Germany. As a senior (2005–2006), Terrell was named team captain by teammates and coaches. Terrell finished the season with averages: 10.5ppg, 7.2rpg, 1.2bpg, 1.8asg, 51.7% FG, 63% FT in 33 games. Terrell played and started in every game his senior year.

Terrell graduated from Vanderbilt in May 2006 with a degree in Human and Organizational Development.

== Professional career ==
USA After graduating from Vanderbilt University, Terrell was chosen to attend Washington Wizards (NBA) summer rookie training camp. July 2006: NBA Las Vegas Summer League (Washington Wizards): 3 games: 1.3ppg, 0.7rpg, FG: 25.0% July 2006: NBA Summer Pro League in Long Beach (Washington Wizards) January 2007: signed with Arkansas RimRockers of the NBA Development League: 20 games: 4.4ppg, 2.8rpg, FG: 58.3%, FT: 55.9%: waived March 10. July 2007: HSM International Exposure Camp in Las Vegas, Nevada

Korea August 2006: signed with KT&G Kites. Never played an official game.

Germany October 2006: Artland Dragons (Germany-1.Bundesliga): 5 games: 3.8ppg, 3.6rpg, FG: 42.9%, FT: 70.0%. Left Jan 2007 after replacing fellow Vanderbilt teammate Brian Thornton. August 2008 – 2009: Köln 99ers (Germany-1.Bundesliga, starting five): 32 games: 8.4ppg, 5.2rpg, 1.0apg, FGP: 52.8%, 3PT: 33.3%, FT: 59.1%

Puerto Rico March 2007: Guayama Wizards (Puerto Rico-BSN) but left very shortly without playing any game

Turkey August 2007: TED Kolejliler (Turkey-TBL): only pre-season

Portugal October 2007 – 2008: FC Porto Ferpinta (Portugal-UZO Liga, starting five): 20 games: 11.1ppg, Reb-4(8.5rpg), 1.7apg, 1.0spg, 1.1bpg, 2FGP: 52.2%, FT: 66.0%. Won the Portugal League Cup. August 2009 – 2010: Porto Ferpinta (Portugal-LPB, starting five): 33 games: 11.8ppg, 8.3rpg, 1.1apg, 1.1spg, Blocks-2(1.2bpg), FGP: 53.1%, 3PT: 30.4%, FT: 61.9%. Won Portugal League Cup and Portugal Cup. August 2010 – 2011: FC Porto Ferpinta (Portugal-LPB, starting five) currently averaging 12.9ppg, 9.4rbg, 53.8% FG, 80.4% FT, 1.6apg, 1.8 spg in 17 games. Regular Season Champion and League Champion for the 2010–2011 season.

United Arab Emirates September 2011 – January 2012 Al Wasl SC Dubai

Belgium February 2012 – May 2012 Leuven Bears Leuven, Belgium Terrell signed a contract til the end of the season to help Leuven Bears whom were dealing with several injuries. During his time with Leuven, Terrell played in 9 games averaging 5.9ppg and 3.8rpg in 18mpg.

Finland October 2012 – December 2012: Kataja Basket Club Korisliiga Terrell was signed to a 7-week contract to help Kataja during their FIBA Eurochallenge games. During the 7 weeks he played in 5 games averaging 8.6 ppg and 5.6 rpg in 25 mpg. Also playing in 5 Finnish Korsliga games, Terrell averaged 14.4 ppg and 8 rpg.

Kosovo February 2013 – June 2013: Sigal Prishtina Terrell signed a contract with Sigal Prishtina to complete the 2012–2013 BKT Superleague season in February 2013. During his time, he helped the team achieve goals of winning the Kosovo Cup Championship and reaching the finals only to lose to Peja in 3 games.

== Coaching career ==
In August 2013, Terrell was hired by Kevin Stallings as the Director of Video Operations. After 2 successful seasons at Vanderbilt University, Julian Terrell was hired by Dave Loos to become the next assistant men's basketball coach at Austin Peay State University. During his time, Austin Peay became the first OVC men's team to reach the OVC tournament as an 8 seed and win 4 games in 4 days to become the OVC Tournament Champions. THE Govs went on to play Kansas in the first game of the NCAA tournament. Upon retirement of Loos, Terrell was hired on September 15, 2017, as an assistant coach for the Windy City Bulls.
