= Liga Portuguesa de Basquetebol =

Liga Portuguesa de Basquetebol (LPB)
- Founded: 1932; 94 years ago
- First season: 1932–33
- Country: Portugal
- Confederation: FIBA Europe
- Number of teams: 12
- Level on pyramid: 1
- Relegation to: Proliga
- Domestic cup(s): Portuguese Basketball Cup; League Cup
- Supercup: Super Cup
- International cup(s): Basketball Champions League; Europe Cup
- Current champions: Porto (13th title)
- Most championships: Benfica (31 titles)
- TV partners: A Bola TV; Benfica TV; Porto Canal; RTP2; Sporting TV
- Website: FPB.pt
- 2025–26 season

The Liga Portuguesa de Basquetebol (English: Portuguese Basketball League), also known as LPB, or Liga Betclic for sponsorship reasons, is the top men's professional club basketball league in Portugal.

== History ==
From the 2008–09 season onward, the competition has been again organised by the Federação Portuguesa de Basquetebol (Portuguese Basketball Federation) after not having been for 13 seasons. This was caused by the fold of the LPB after many years of financial problems, with the league now being a semi-professional league.

Between the 1965–66 and 1973–74 seasons, the league champions were determined by a tournament between the winners of the Campeonato Metropolitano (representing Portugal) and the champions of the then Portuguese colonies Mozambique and Angola, as a similar fashion to the Portuguese Roller Hockey First Division, which was also played during those seasons. However, the first of these tournaments never came to be because of a protest launched by Mozambican team Sporting de Lourenço Marques.

== Teams ==
Team	Home city	Arena
AD Galomar	Caniço	Pavilhão do Caniço
CD Póvoa	Póvoa de Varzim	Pavilhão do Clube Desportivo Póvoa
CP Esgueira	Esgueira	Pavilhão Clube do Povo de Esgueira
FC Porto	Porto	Dragão Arena
Galitos BARREIRO	Barreiro	Pavilhão Municipal Prof Luís de Carvalho
Imortal LUZiGÁS	Albufeira	Pavilhão Desportivo de Albufeira
Ovarense GAVEX	Ovar	Arena de Ovar
Queluz O NOSSO PREGO	Queluz	Pavilhão Henrique Miranda
SL Benfica	Lisbon	Pavilhão Fidelidade
Sporting CP	Lisbon	Pavilhão João Rocha
UD Oliveirense	Oliveira de Azeméis	Pavilhão Dr. Salvador Machado
Vitória SC	Guimarães	Pavilhão Desportivo Unidade Vimaranense

== Portuguese champions ==
- 1932–33: Conimbricense
- 1933–34: União de Lisboa
- 1934–35: Carnide
- 1935–36: Carnide (2)
- 1936–37: Carnide (3)
- 1937–38: Carnide (4)
- 1938–39: Belenenses
- 1939–40: Benfica
- 1940–41: Carnide (5)
- 1941–42: Vasco da Gama
- 1942–43: Carnide (6)
- 1943–44: Carnide (7)
- 1944–45: Belenenses (2)
- 1945–46: Benfica (2)
- 1946–47: Benfica (3)
- 1947–48: Vasco da Gama (2)
- 1948–49: Académica de Coimbra
- 1949–50: Académica de Coimbra (2)
- 1950–51: Vasco da Gama (3)
- 1951–52: Porto
- 1952–53: Porto (2)
- 1953–54: Sporting CP
- 1954–55: Académica de Coimbra (3)
- 1955–56: Sporting CP (2)
- 1956–57: Barreirense
- 1957–58: Barreirense (2)

- 1958–59: Académica de Coimbra (4)
- 1959–60: Sporting CP (3)
- 1960–61: Benfica (4)
- 1961–62: Benfica (5)
- 1962–63: Benfica (6)
- 1963–64: Benfica (7)
- 1964–65: Benfica (8)
- 1965–66: not disputed
- 1966–67: Benfica de Luanda (ANG)
- 1967–68: Sporting de Lourenço Marques (MOZ)
- 1968–69: Sporting CP (4)
- 1969–70: Benfica (9)
- 1970–71: Sporting de Lourenço Marques (MOZ) (2)
- 1971–72: Porto (3)
- 1972–73: Sporting de Lourenço Marques (MOZ) (3)
- 1973–74: CD Malhangalene (MOZ)
- 1974–75: Benfica (10)
- 1975–76: Sporting CP (5)
- 1976–77: Ginásio
- 1977–78: Sporting CP (6)
- 1978–79: Porto (4)
- 1979–80: Porto (5)
- 1980–81: Sporting CP (7)
- 1981–82: Sporting CP (8)
- 1982–83: Porto (6)

- 1983–84: Queluz
- 1984–85: Benfica (11)
- 1985–86: Benfica (12)
- 1986–87: Benfica (13)
- 1987–88: Ovarense
- 1988–89: Benfica (14)
- 1989–90: Benfica (15)
- 1990–91: Benfica (16)
- 1991–92: Benfica (17)
- 1992–93: Benfica (18)
- 1993–94: Benfica (19)
- 1994–95: Benfica (20)
- 1995–96: Porto (7)
- 1996–97: Porto (8)
- 1997–98: Estrelas da Avenida
- 1998–99: Porto (9)
- 1999–2000: Ovarense (2)
- 2000–01: Portugal Telecom

- 2001–02: Portugal Telecom (2)
- 2002–03: Portugal Telecom (3)
- 2003–04: Porto (10)
- 2004–05: Queluz (2)
- 2005–06: Ovarense (3)
- 2006–07: Ovarense (4)
- 2007–08: Ovarense (5)
- 2008–09: Benfica (21)
- 2009–10: Benfica (22)
- 2010–11: Porto (11)
- 2011–12: Benfica (23)
- 2012–13: Benfica (24)
- 2013–14: Benfica (25)
- 2014–15: Benfica (26)
- 2015–16: Porto (12)
- 2016–17: Benfica (27)
- 2017–18: Oliveirense
- 2018–19: Oliveirense (2)
- 2019–20: Cancelled due to COVID-19 pandemic
- 2020–21: Sporting CP (9)
- 2021–22: Benfica (28)
- 2022–23: Benfica (29)
- 2023–24: Benfica (30)
- 2024–25: Benfica (31)
- 2025–26: Porto (13)

=== Campeonato Metropolitano champions ===
- 1965–66: Benfica
- 1966–67: Académica de Coimbra
- 1967–68: Ass. Desp. do Banco Pinto de Magalhães
- 1968–69: Sporting CP
- 1969–70: Benfica (2)
- 1970–71: Benfica (3)
- 1971–72: Porto
- 1972–73: Benfica (4)
- 1973–74: Benfica (5)

== Liga de Clubes de Basquetebol champions ==
Year	Final		
Year	Champions	Score	Runners-up
1995–96	Porto (7)	3–1	Benfica
1996–97	Porto (8)	3–1	Oliveirense
1997–98	Estrelas da Avenida	3–2	Ovarense
1998–99	Porto (9)	3–1	Illiabum
1999–2000	Ovarense (2)	3–0	Porto
2000–01	Portugal Telecom	3–1	Oliveirense
2001–02	Portugal Telecom (2)	3–0	Oliveirense
2002–03	Portugal Telecom (3)	3–2	Oliveirense
2003–04	Porto (10)	3–1	Queluz
2004–05	Queluz (2)	3–0	Ovarense
2005–06	Ovarense (3)	3–0	Ginásio
2006–07	Ovarense (4)	3–2	Porto
2007–08	Ovarense (5)	4–3	Porto

== Liga Portuguesa de Basquetebol champions ==
Year	Final		
Year	Champions	Score	Runners-up
2008–09	Benfica (21)	4–0	Ovarense
2009–10	Benfica (22)	4–1	Porto
2010–11	Porto (11)	4–3	Benfica
2011–12	Benfica (23)	3–2	Porto
2012–13	Benfica (24)	3–1	Académica de Coimbra
2013–14	Benfica (25)	3–0	Vitória de Guimarães
2014–15	Benfica (26)	3–0	Vitória de Guimarães
2015–16	Porto (12)	3–1	Benfica
2016–17	Benfica (27)	3–0	Porto
2017–18	Oliveirense	3–0	Porto
2018–19	Oliveirense (2)	3–1	Benfica
2019–20	Cancelled due to the COVID-19 pandemic		
2020–21	Sporting CP (9)	3–2	Porto
2021–22	Benfica (28)	3–1	Porto
2022–23	Benfica (29)	3–1	Sporting CP
2023–24	Benfica (30)	3–0	Porto
2024–25	Benfica (31)	3–1	Porto
2025–26	Porto (13)	3–1	Benfica

== Performance by club ==
Team	Won	Years won
Benfica	31	1940, 1946, 1947, 1961, 1962, 1963, 1964, 1965, 1970, 1975, 1985, 1986, 1987, 1989, 1990, 1991, 1992, 1993, 1994, 1995, 2009, 2010, 2012, 2013, 2014, 2015, 2017, 2022, 2023, 2024, 2025
Porto	13	1952, 1953, 1972, 1979, 1980, 1983, 1996, 1997, 1999, 2004, 2011, 2016, 2026
Sporting CP	9	1954, 1956, 1960, 1969, 1976, 1978, 1981, 1982, 2021
Carnide	7	1935, 1936, 1937, 1938, 1941, 1943, 1944
Ovarense	5	1988, 2000, 2006, 2007, 2008
Académica de Coimbra	4	1949, 1950, 1955, 1959
Vasco da Gama	3	1942, 1948, 1951
Sporting de Lourenço Marques (MOZ)	3	1968, 1971, 1973
Portugal Telecom	3	2001, 2002, 2003
Belenenses	2	1939, 1945
Barreirense	2	1957, 1958
Queluz	2	1984, 2005
Oliveirense	2	2018, 2019
Conimbricense	1	1933
União de Lisboa	1	1934
Benfica de Luanda (ANG)	1	1967
CD Malhangalene (MOZ)	1	1974
Ginásio	1	1977
Estrelas da Avenida	1	1998

== Records ==
- Benfica became the second team in basketball history to achieve a perfect regular season (100% wins) in the 2008–09 season, after Maccabi Tel Aviv in the 1970s.
