= Sangalhos =

Civil parish in Portugal

- Civil parish
- Location in Portugal
- Coordinates: 40.493°N 8.474°W
- Country: Portugal
- Region: Centro
- Intermunic. comm.: Região de Aveiro
- District: Aveiro
- Municipality: Anadia

Area
  - Total: 16.90 km^{2} (6.53 sq mi)
- Elevation: 73 m (240 ft)

Population (2011)
  - Total: 4,068
  - Density: 240.7/km^{2} (623.4/sq mi)
- Time zone: UTC+00:00 (WET)
  - Summer (DST): UTC+01:00 (WEST)
- Postal code: 3780
- Area code: 292
- Patron: São Vicente
- Website: http://www.freguesiadesangalhos.eu/

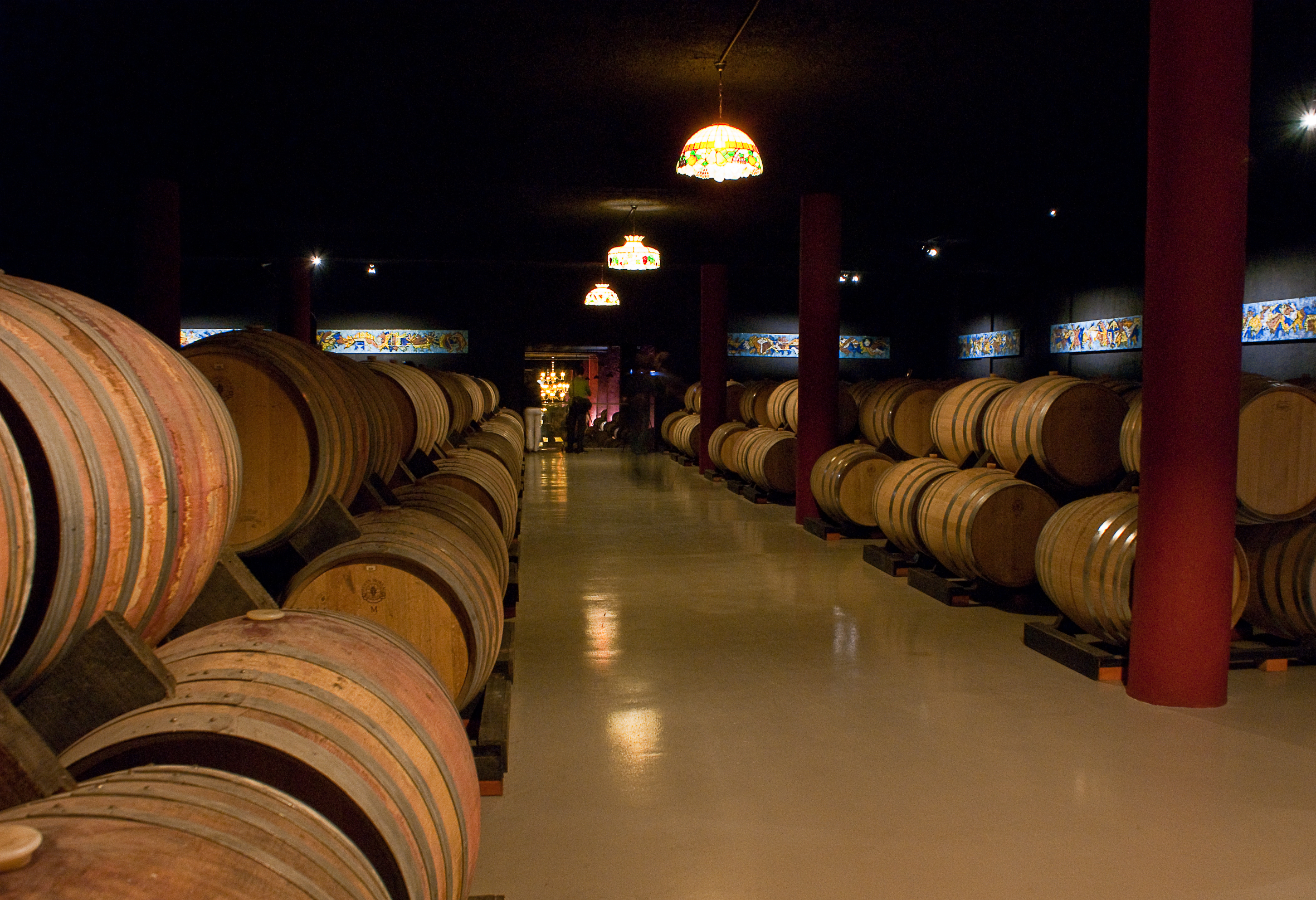
Aliança Underground Museum in Sangalhos

Sangalhos is a town and a civil parish in the municipality of Anadia, Portugal. The population in 2011 was 4,068, in an area of 16.90 km^{2} (6.53 sq mi).

== History ==
Archaeological remnants dating back to the Roman era presuppose a minor community within the territory of Sangalhos. The pre-Roman peoples of the region of the Vouga was already a mixture of races and cultures from the northern Europe and Mediterranean, but principally of Celtic or Turduli. The origin of its name sangalhos, which refers to a unit of measure, as hypothesized by Joaquim de Silveira, came from the cult of São Galo (Sanctus Gallus). The author placed the origin of its parish in the 7th century, during the Visigothic period. During the Roman era, the area was part of the Roman civitas Talabriga (Marnel, Lamas do Vouga).

The first documents that refer to Sangalhos date back to 957 A.D., and progress until the founding of the Portuguese Kingdom. In 1064, with the conquest of Coimbra, the lands of the Bairrada were liberated from the Moors. The hamlet of Sangalhos, appropriated by Count Sesnando, first and illustrious governor of Coimbra, was donated to the Church (and Hospital) of Mirleos, founded in the city of Mondego. But, by 1220-1221, during the administrative inquiries, Sangalhos and its parish Church of São Vicente, had already passed into the hands of the Crown. During this era, the parish consisted of two metropoles: its seat, Sangalhos do Paço (et alio Sancto Galios), and Sangalhos da Igreja (Sancto Galios), in addition to the localities of Saima, Sá, Casal da Rua and Avelãs de Caminho

The great monasteries of Lorvão, Vacariça, and Santa Clara de Coimbra dominated the activities in the region of the Bairrada. Santa Clara de Coimbra, founded by nun Mor Dias at the beginning of the 14th century, in who the patronage and lands of Sangalhos was entrusted after 1338. The first years were turbulent for the nun, who although a nun in the Order of the Holy Cross, was not supported by royal and Crusader donations. The intervention of Queen Elizabeth of Aragon, assisted resolving these disputes, and provided the authorization to build a new monastery in the name of Santa Clara and Santa Isabel.

In the 12th and 13th century, Sangalhos was one of the principal towns in the region, along with Horta (Tamengos), Recardães and Óis da Ribeira. It was selected by Afonso Henriques to be a test area for the use of the alqueire unit of measure in the distribution and productivity of lands. The alqueire, equivalent to Roman (8.733 litres), was adopted by the King around 1179, the same year that forals were bestowed on Coimbra, Santarém and Lisbon. In the archbishopric of Vouga and bishopric of Oporto, the Henriquino alqueire began to be referred to as the Sangalhos, sangalhês or sangalho. It was only in the 16th century, that this unit of measure fell into disuse, during King Manuel I of Portugal's reforms (although the reference continued to be used by many rural farmers).

In 1320, the church of São Vicente de Sangalhos was the most active church in the Bairrada and Baixo Vouga region.

Until the Middle Ages it was the municipal seat of its own territory (its foral was officially conferred in 1514 by King Manuel I of Portugal, during the King's administrative reorganization), although Avelãs do Caminho continued be a religious dependency of Sangalhos until the 19th century. By 1338, the land in Sangalhos was donated to the monastery of Santa Clara de Coimbra. This institution, which possessed the land during the next 500 years, was the primary motivator for settlement. As a result, Amoreira da Gândara, Fogueira, Paraimo and São João, all mentioned in the Manuelino foral, were increasingly active hamlets. As a component of the larger Archdiocese of Vouga, it was ruled by the Bishop of Coimbra, until it was later incorporated into Diocese of Aveiro (1774). By 1623, the monastery of Santa Clara de Coimbra received rents from 300 families and individuals working those lands; an area that included 2000 ha of semi-forested lands. By 1720, those rents had been significant enough to allow the construction of new chapel to the church through only one year's rents.

When Sangalhos reverted to a civil parish in the 16th century, it was incorporated into the burgh of Vouga, that also pertained to the municipality of Marnel, thus integrating Sangalhos into the comarca of Aveiro. Sangelhos became a regional military outpost, whose territory included many of the local parishes of the modern municipalities of Anadia, Oliveira do Bairro and Águeda. Divided in four companies, it was one of the more extensive military Captaincies of the region.

After the Liberal Wars (1820–1835), the donation to the monastery of Santa Clara de Coimbra was annulled and the municipalities of Sangalhos and Avelãs do Caminho (which became an independent parish within Anadia) became extinct. Similarly, the military Captaincy of Sangalhos was discontinued and Sangalhos became integrated into the municipality of Oliveira do Bairro, later São Lourenço do Bairro and, finally (1853), within the municipality of Anadia. As such, although geographically close to the neighboring city of Oliveira do Bairro, the parish was integrated into Anadia. By 1928, Amoreira da Gândara separated from Sangalhos to form a new parish.

Although the parish lost much of its politico-administrative importance, Sangalhos until the 20th century, prospered. Its inhabitants built many prosperous businesses that influenced the growth and development of the community, including pioneering bicycle production in Portugal and ceramics industry. Consequently, Sangalhos returned to the status of town in 1985 (Decrete-Law 65/85, 25 September).

== Geography ==
Sangalhos is situated along a summit that overlooks the valley of the Cértima River, an area of ample vistas and vegetation that extends to the south towards Buçaco and east towards the summit of Caramulo (Caramulinho), known by locals as the Cesto Poceiro. Its central urban area is located 7.5 kilometres from the municipal seat of Anadia, and 24 kilometres southwest of the district capital (Aveiro). It is surrounded by the municipality and parish of Oliveira do Bairro, as well as Aguada de Baixo (in the municipality of Águeda), and its municipal neighbors Amoreira da Gândara, Mogofores, Ancas, Avelãs de Cima, Avelãs de Caminho, Paredes do Bairro, Arcos and São Lourenço do Bairro in the municipality of Anadia. The parish contains the settlements Fogueira, Paço, Paraimo, Póvoa do Castelo, Póvoa do Mato, Póvoa do Salgueiro, Porto Lobo, Ribeiro, Sá, São João da Azenha, Sangalhos, Vidoeiro and Vila.
