= Portimonense Basquetebol =

Portuguese professional basketball team

Portimonense S.C.
- Nickname: Portimonense
- Leagues: Proliga
- Arena: Pavilhão Municipal da Boavista
- Capacity: 450
- Location: Portimão, Portugal
- Team colors: Black, White, Yellow
- President: José Fernando Teixeira da Rocha
- Head coach: Carlos Almeida
- Championships: Campeonato Nacional Basquetebol
- Website: portimonense.pt
Home	Away

Portimonense Sporting Clube, commonly known as Portimonense Basquetebol or simply Portimonense is a professional basketball team based in the city of Portimão, Portugal, that plays in the Proliga (Portugal) basketball league. It is a part of the Portimonense sports club. In 2020, the team guaranteed the promotion to Proliga, the second tier of the sport in Portugal. They obtained their first national title by triumphing in the final, played on July 4 in Barreiro, over Galitos de Aveiro by 71–62.

== Achievements ==
- Campeonato Nacional Basquetebol: 1

2020–21

- António Pratas Trophy: 1

2022–23

== Notable players ==
Note: Flags indicate national team eligibility at FIBA-sanctioned events. Players may hold other non-FIBA nationalities not displayed.

Criteria

To appear in this section a player must have either:

- Set a club record or won an individual award while at the club
- Played at least one official international match for their national team at any time
- Played at least one official NBA match at any time.
