= Associação Académica de Coimbra (basketball) =

Associação Académica de Coimbra B.C. is a Portuguese professional basketball club. The club competes in the Portuguese Basketball League. It is part of the Associação Académica de Coimbra (AAC) which also is the originating body of several other sports teams.

AAC Basquetebol won the Portuguese national basketball championship for the first time in 1949.
