= FC Porto (basketball) =

Professional basketball team in Porto, Portugal

- Leagues: LPB; Champions League
- Founded: 1926
- History: FC Porto (1926–2012, 2015–); Dragon Force (2012–2015)
- Arena: Dragão Arena
- Capacity: 2,200
- Location: Porto, Portugal
- Team colors: Blue, white
- President: André Villas-Boas
- Head coach: Fernando Sá
- Team captain: Miguel Queiroz
- Ownership: FC Porto
- Championships: 13 Portuguese Leagues; 16 Portuguese Cups; 9 Portuguese Super Cups; 8 Portuguese League Cups; 1 Portuguese Champions Tournament
- Website: fcporto.pt
Home	Away

Futebol Clube do Porto (Portuguese pronunciation: [futɨˈβɔl ˈkluβɨ ðu ˈpoɾtu]), commonly referred to as FC Porto, or simply Porto, is a Portuguese professional basketball team based in Porto. Created in 1926, it is the senior representative side of the basketball section of multi-sports club FC Porto. The team competes domestically in the Liga Portuguesa de Basquetebol (LPB) and internationally in FIBA Europe competitions, such as the Champions League and the FIBA Europe Cup. The team plays its home matches at the Dragão Arena, alongside the club's handball and roller hockey teams, and is managed by Portuguese head coach and former club player Fernando Sá since 2022.

== History ==
=== Foundation ===
The introduction of the sport in Portugal took place in 1913, and thirteen years later in 1926 a group of partners of the club decided to create a basketball team. António Sanches, António Marta and Daniel Barbosa drove the idea, having them joined by Gabriel Batista and A. Cabral to complete the team. The second place in the Cup António Cardoso guaranteed in the first season excites the community that forms immediately four other basketball teams. FC Porto basketball players trained in an outdoor field complex included in Campo da Constituição.

=== Early years ===
The decades of the thirties and forties were not very fertile in securities for the basketball section of FC Porto, but still the sport was up solidifying a club that showed increasingly eclectic. In the year 1933, the first Campeonato de Portugal was played, and Porto participated alongside Conimbricense, Académico, Fluvial, Guifões, Sp. Braga, Atlético de Braga and Sporting de Gouveia. In 1940, FC Porto have played in a covered, lighted, on Avenida dos Aliados enclosure. The fruit came in late because in 1947–48 and 1949–50 FC Porto was national champion of the second division and two seasons later was national champion in the First Division in 1951–52 and 1952–53.

=== The 1990s achievements ===
The year 1995 marks a crucial turning point in Portuguese basketball. It is in this year that the League Basketball Club, founded six years earlier, organized the first professional league. The FC Porto basketball section is associated with a sponsor at the time the UBP (going to be appointed FC Porto UBP), and enters with his right foot in the era of professional basketball, winning the first two editions of the league. Around the same time, the team moved to the Pavilhão Rosa Mota, which would provide better working conditions. In 1997 it is created the FC Porto, Basquetbol, SAD, alongside FC Porto Futebol, SAD. The president Jorge Nuno Pinto da Costa accumulated the presidency of both SADs and the club, while Fernando Gomes became the primary administrator.

Although nationally FC Porto is among the best title contenders in all competitions, their performance at the international level is modest, reflecting the position of the Portuguese Basketball against the other European and world federations. Their best European performance succeeded in 1997 and 2000, years that reached the quarter-finals of the FIBA Saporta Cup (in 1997 still called FIBA EuroCup). In between, in 1999, Paulo Pinto, then Porto player, was elected by FIBA as one of the 50 best players in Europe and, as such, included in the list of candidates to join the western selection EURO ALL STAR.

=== Recent years ===
At the end of the 2011–12 season the responsible section informed the coaching staff, which was represented by head coach Moncho López, assistant coach Diogo Gomes, and players (captain Nuno Marçal, André Bessa and David Gomes attended) that the senior team would not compete in the major league championship after losing to Benfica at the Dragão Arena. A new project for the section which fielded players from the section's youth ranks was initiated, they started training under the designation Dragon Force who competed in the national championship CNB third division in season 2012/2013, participating in the final competition. The team secured promotion to the second-tier Proliga in 2013–14, winning that season's title in a playoff final against Illiabum.

Having earned the right to compete in the LPB, the club decided to remain in the Proliga for the 2014–15 season. The team defended their Proliga title without losing any match, and were promoted to the 2015–16 LPB. Competing again under the name of FC Porto, the team qualified for the championship playoffs and reached the final, where they beat the four-time defending champions Benfica to secure the club's 12th title. After ten years in 2026 FC Porto secure 13th title again beating Benfica 3–1 in playoffs final.

== Current roster ==
FC Porto roster
Players
Coaches

Pos.	No.	Nat.	Name	Ht.	Wt.	Age
SF	3	(Portugal)	Voytso, Vladyslav	2.00 m (6 ft 7 in)		27 – 30 July 1999
PG	5	(United States)	Allen, Corey	1.87 m (6 ft 2 in)		28 – 29 April 1998
C	6	(Portugal)	Carrera, Yago	2.03 m (6 ft 8 in)		20 – 6 March 2006
PF	7	(Portugal)	Guerreiro, João	2.06 m (6 ft 9 in)		36 – 10 October 1990
F/C	8	(Portugal)	Delgado, Goncalo	2.02 m (6 ft 8 in)		28 – 22 January 1998
SF	9	(United States) (Liberia)	Bropleh, Thomas	1.95 m (6 ft 5 in)		35 – 17 August 1991
SG	10	(United States)	Woodard, James	1.91 m (6 ft 3 in)		32 – 24 January 1994
F/C	11	(Portugal)	Queiroz, Miguel (C)	2.02 m (6 ft 8 in)		35 – 4 July 1991
SF	15	(United States)	Omlid, Tanner	1.96 m (6 ft 5 in)		32 – 2 December 1993
PF	20	(United States)	Williams, Xeyrius	2.06 m (6 ft 9 in)		29 – 26 May 1997
SF	44	(Portugal)	Machado, Pedro	1.99 m (6 ft 6 in)		21 – 4 April 2005
PG	55	(Angola)	Dundao, Childe	1.67 m (5 ft 6 in)		28 – 17 May 1998
PG	99	(Portugal)	Bessa, Andre	1.79 m (5 ft 10 in)		37 – 13 January 1989

Head coach

- (Portugal) Fernando Sá

Assistant coach(es)

- (Portugal) João Pedro Gonçalves
- (Portugal) João Henriques
- (Portugal) Vítor Carvalho
- (Portugal) Paulo Cunha
- (Portugal) Artur Dias

Legend

- (C) Team captain
- Injured

- Roster
Updated: October 17, 2026

Note: Flags indicate national team eligibility at FIBA-sanctioned events. Players may hold other non-FIBA nationalities not displayed.

== Honours ==
=== Domestic competitions ===
- Portuguese League

Winners (13): 1951–52, 1952–53, 1971–72, 1978–79, 1979–80, 1982–83, 1995–96, 1996–97, 1998–99, 2003–04, 2010–11, 2015–16, 2025–26

- Campeonato Metropolitano

Winners (1): 1971–72

- Portuguese Cup

Winners (16): 1978–79, 1985–86, 1986–87, 1987–88, 1990–91, 1996–97, 1998–99, 1999–00, 2003–04, 2005–06, 2006–07, 2009–10, 2011–12, 2018–19, 2023–24, 2024–25

- League Cup / Hugo dos Santos Cup

Winners (8): 1999–00, 2001–02, 2003–04, 2007–08, 2009–10, 2011–12, 2015–16, 2020–21

- Portuguese Super Cup

Winners (9): 1986, 1997, 1999, 2004, 2011, 2016, 2019, 2024, 2026

- António Pratas Trophy (LPB)

Winners (1): 2010–11

- Champions Tournament

Winners (1): 2005–06

Dragon Force

- Proliga

Winners (2): 2013–14, 2014–15

- António Pratas Trophy (Proliga)

Winners (1): 2014–15

=== European competitions ===
- FIBA Saporta Cup

Quarter-Final (2): 1996–97, 1999–00
Last 16 (2): 1987–88, 2000–01

- FIBA Korać Cup

Last 16 (1): 2001–02

- FIBA Europe Champions Cup

Last 16 (1): 2002–03

- FIBA Europe Cup

Quarter-Final (2): 2022–23, 2023–24

== Former notable players ==
Won an official title or individual titles

- (Portugal) Fernando Assunção (9 seasons: 1966–76)
- (Portugal) Alberto Babo (10 seasons: 1968–74, 1975–79)
- (Portugal) Fernando Gomes (13 seasons: 1969–82)
- (Portugal) Rui Pereira (10 seasons: 1976–84, 1985–87)
- (Portugal) Zé Quintela (7 seasons: 1977–81, 1983–86)
- (Portugal) Tó Ferreira (9 seasons: 1979–83, 1984–89)
- (Portugal) Júlio Matos (15 seasons: 1979–89, 1990–94)
- (Portugal) Beto Van Zeller (6 seasons: 1980–84, 1985–87)
- (United States) Charles Payton (1 season: 1982–83)
- (Portugal) Pedro Miguel (5 seasons: 1985–90)
- (Portugal) José Cardoso (7 seasons: 1985–90, 1993–95)
- (Portugal) Steve Rocha (5 seasons: 1986–88, 1989–92)
- (Portugal) Fernando Sá (12 seasons: 1987–99)
- (Portugal) Rui Santos (11 seasons: 1988–97, 1998–2001)
- (United States) Wayne Engelstad (2 seasons: 1992–93, 1998–99)
- (Portugal) João Rocha (11 seasons: 1992–98, 1999–2001, 2002–04, 2005–06)
- (Portugal) Nuno Marçal (16 seasons: 1992–99, 2000–03, 2006–12)
- (Portugal) Paulo Pinto (6 seasons: 1994–2000)
- (Portugal) Miguel Miranda (8 seasons: 1996–2000, 2010–12, 2016–18)
- (Portugal) Elvis Évora (7 seasons: 1998–2005)
- (Portugal) Paulo Cunha (11 seasons: 1999–2010)
- (United States) Reggie Geary (1 season: 2001–02)
- (United States) Heshimu Evans (2 seasons: 2003–05)
- (Portugal) Carlos Andrade (4 seasons: 2003–04, 2009–12)
- (Cape Verde) Rodrigo Mascarenhas (3 seasons: 2004–07)
- (United States) Julian Terrell (3 seasons: 2007–08, 2009–11)
- (Spain) Ferrán Ventura (6 seasons: 2013–19)
- (United States) Troy DeVries (1 season: 2015–16)
- (United States) Seth Hinrichs (1 season: 2015–16)
- (United States) Jalen Riley (1 season: 2020–21)
- (United States) Rawle Alkins
- (United States) Toney Douglas (1 season: 2024–25)
