= Esgueira =

Civil parish in Portugal

- Civil parish
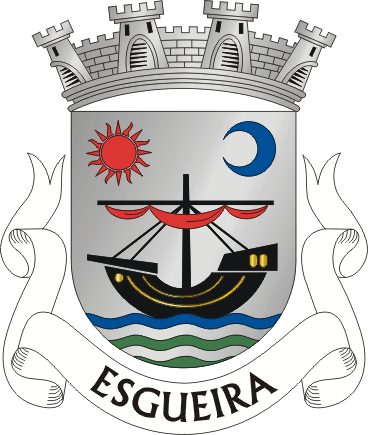
- Coat of arms

- Location in Portugal
- Coordinates: 40.646°N 8.629°W
- Country: Portugal
- Region: Centro
- Intermunic. comm.: Região de Aveiro
- District: Aveiro
- Municipality: Aveiro

Area
  - Total: 17.15 km^{2} (6.62 sq mi)

Population (2011)
  - Total: 13,431
  - Density: 780/km^{2} (2,000/sq mi)
- Time zone: UTC+00:00 (WET)
  - Summer (DST): UTC+01:00 (WEST)
- Postal code: 3800
- Area code: 234

Esgueira is an urban civil parish in the municipality (concelho) of Aveiro, in continental Portugal. The population in 2011 was 13,431, in an area of 17.15 km^{2} (6.62 sq mi).

== History ==
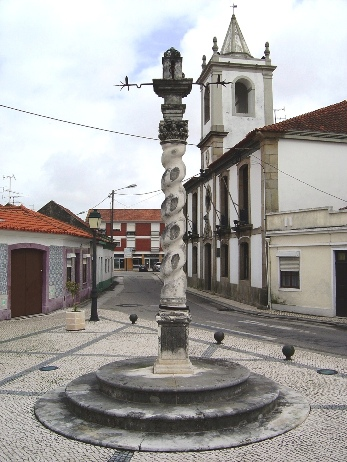
The pillory that marked Esgueiras short history as municipal seat

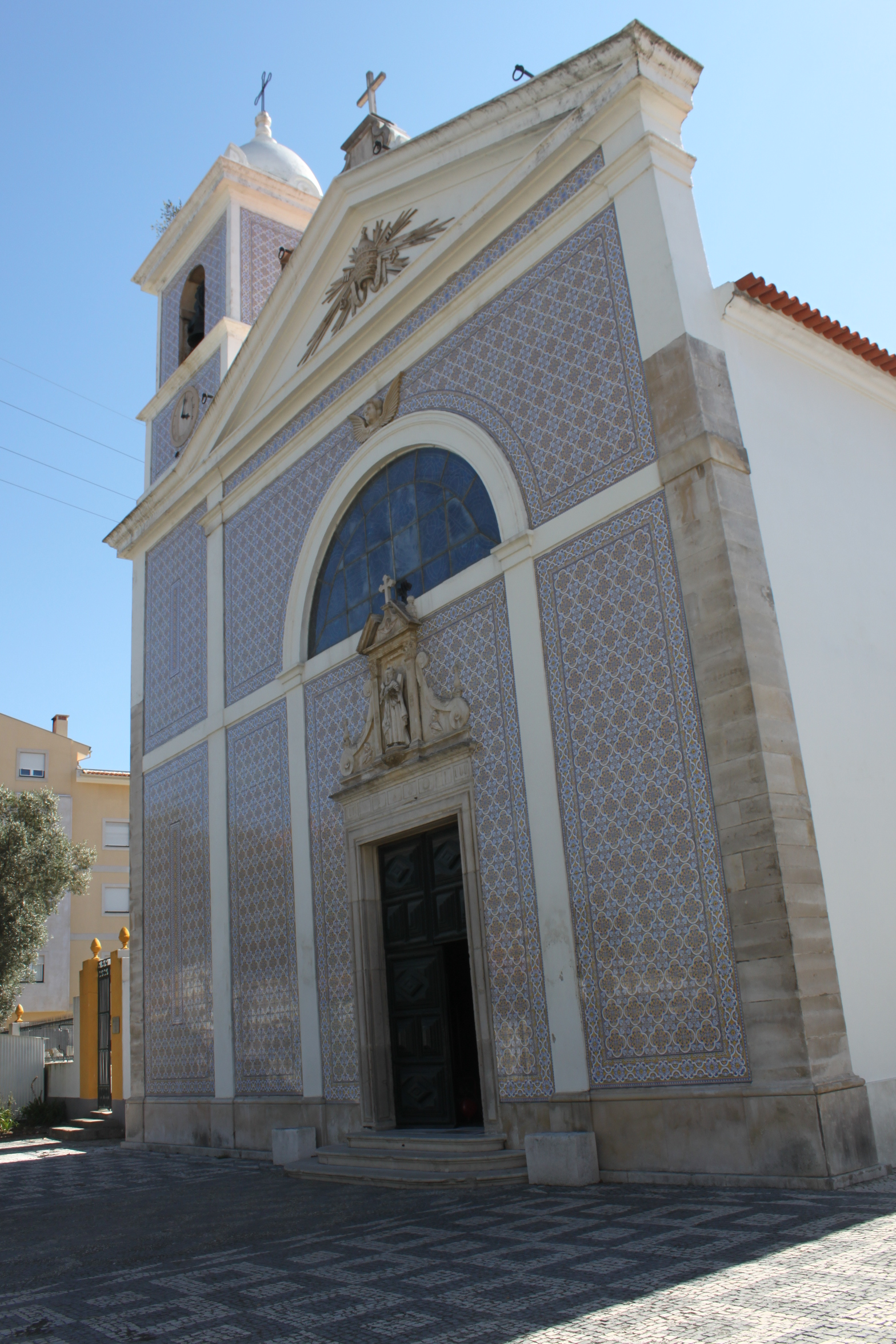
The front facade of the Baroque era parochial Church of Santo André

The history of Esgueira remotes to the early medieval: the first document referring to the region dates to 1050. Specifically, the texts refer to the maritime waters of Esgueira. Outeiro was the locality where the first inhabitants settled.

There are several interpretations of the toponym. That proposed by Monsenhor João Gaspar stands out: Iscaria meant "outeiro", a rocky elevation above Ribeira, the place where now stands the pavilion of Clube do Povo de Esgueira, formerly "Parque do Outeiro".

Its geographic location, alongside tidal flats, permitted, until the 17th century, the development of the salt industry. An active centre in salt commerce, Esqueira was the seat of its jurisdiction (over thirty 31 towns and 10 municipalities). It received a foral (charter) in 1110 from the Count Henrique.

In 1116, the Monastery of Lorvão had possessions in the town, which the Afonso Henriques enlarged in 1176, with the donation of Taboeira, among others.

It was Sancho I that in October 1210, provided Esgueira to his daughter D. Teresa in his testament.

On 8 June 1515, a new foral was issued by Manuel I of Portugal.

During the reign of John III there was a reorganization of the territorial divisions of the kingdom, resulting in the establishment of new comarcas, including Esgueira on 20 December 1533. Between 1528 and 1836, Esgueira was a municipality, consisting of the parishes of Esgueira, Cacia, Nariz and Palhaça, whom, by 1801, included 4426 inhabitants.

With the elevation of Aveiro to city, the lands were converted into crown lands, after the Dukes implicated in the attempted assassination of Joseph I of Portugal were executed: the privileges of the Dukes were removed, and transferred by 6 November 1836 decree, extinguishing the municipality and annexxing Esgueira (as a simple parish) to the municipality of Aveiro.

== Geography ==
The civil parish consists of various localities, including: Senhor do Álamo/Cruzeiro, Bairro do Vouga, Agras do Norte, Cabo Luís, Bela Vista, Taboeira, Quinta do Simão, Mataduços and Paço.

Esgueira has an annual population of approximately 3050 students, distributed among five kindergarten/primary schools (including EB1/JI Taboeira, EB1/JI Esgueira, EB1/JI Alumieira, EB1/JI Quinta do Simão and Cabo Luís/Bela Vista), one middle-school (Escola Básica 2º/3º Ciclos Aires Barbosa), and a secondary school (Escola Secundária Jaime Magalhães Lima).

While the community strives to establish a health centre, it is served by a health outpost on the ground floor of the municipal hall, in addition to a center for handicapped rehabilitation, medical clinics, two dental clinics, two pharmacies, a center for clinical analysis and centre for surgery.

== Architecture ==
=== Civic ===
- Residence of Carvoeira (Casa da Carvoeira/Casa da Cultura de Esgueira)
- Residence of Esgueira (Casa de Esgueira/Creche e Jardim de Infância da Santa Casa da Misericórdia de Aveiro/Solar das Famílias dos Almeida e Eça)

=== Religious ===
- Chapel of Nossa Senhora da Ajuda (Capela de Nossa Senhora da Ajuda)
- Chapel of Nossa Senhora da Alegria (Capela de Nossa Senhora da Alegria/Capela do Álamo)
- Chapel of São Pedro (Capela de São Pedro)
- Chapel of the Espírito Santo (Capela do Espírito Santo)
- Chapel of Sol-Posto (Capela em Sol Posto)
