= Dragão Arena =

Indoor arena in Porto, Portugal

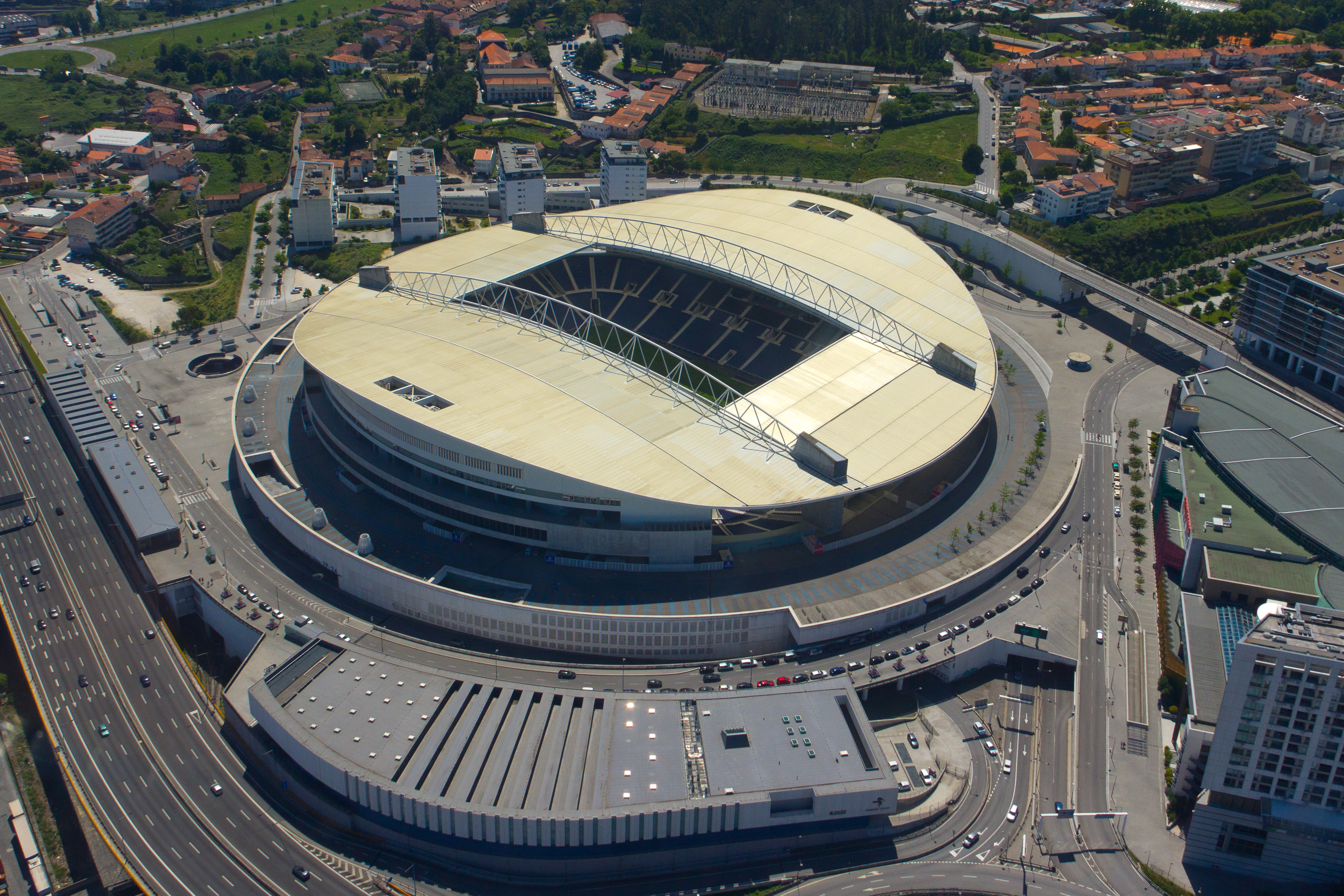
- The arena (bottom) located next to the Estádio do Dragão.
- Interactive map of Dragão Arena
- Location: Porto, Portugal
- Coordinates: 41.162784°N 8.581879°W
- Owner: FC Porto
- Capacity: 2,179
- Acreage: 8,300 m^{2} (2.1 acres)

Construction
- Opened: 23 April 2009
- Architect: Manuel Salgado

Tenants
- Basketball, handball, volleyball, futsal and roller hockey teams

The Dragão Arena (formerly named Dragão Caixa for sponsorship reasons) is an indoor arena located in Porto, Portugal, that houses the basketball, handball, volleyball, futsal and roller hockey teams of FC Porto. It was inaugurated on 23 April 2009 and has a capacity of 2,179 spectators. The construction project was done in partnership with Portuguese state-owned bank Caixa Geral de Depósitos, which secured the naming rights for a period of 10 years.

The arena was designed by Manuel Salgado, the architect of the Estádio do Dragão. It was projected to house the club's basketball, handball and roller hockey teams under the same roof for the first time since 2001, when the previous ground – Pavilhão Americo de Sá – was demolished ahead of the stadium construction works.
