= 2018–19 Basketball Champions League playoffs =

The 2018–19 Basketball Champions League playoffs will begin on 5 March, and will end on 5 May, with the Final, which will decide the champions of the 2018–19 Basketball Champions League. 16 teams compete in the play-offs.

== Format ==
The playoffs involved the sixteen teams which qualified between the four first teams of each of the four groups in the 2018–19 Basketball Champions League Regular season.

The group winners will face the fourth qualified teams and the runners-up will play against the third qualified teams. Winners and runners-up will play the second leg at home. In addition, the winners of the matches involving the group winners will play also the second leg of the quarterfinals at home.

Each tie in the playoffs, apart from the Final Four games, was played with two legs, with each team playing one leg at home. The team that scored more points on aggregate, over the two legs, advanced to the next round.

For the round of 16, teams from the same group cannot be drawn against each other.

== Qualified teams ==
Key to colors
Seeded teams	Unseeded teams

Group	Winners	Runners-up	Third	Fourth
A	(Spain) UCAM Murcia	(Turkey) Banvit	(Russia) Nizhny Novgorod	(France) Le Mans Sarthe
B	(Spain) Iberostar Tenerife	(Italy) Umana Reyer Venezia	(France) Nanterre 92	(Greece) PAOK
C	(Greece) AEK	(Israel) Hapoel Jerusalem	(Germany) Brose Bamberg	(Belgium) Telenet Giants Antwerp
D	(Italy) Segafredo Virtus Bologna	(Turkey) Beşiktaş Sompo Japan	(Lithuania) Neptūnas	(Greece) Promitheas

== Bracket ==
Round of 16
(France) Nanterre 92	68	62	130
(Turkey) Beşiktaş Sompo Japan	59	60	119
(France) Le Mans Sarthe	74	58	132
(Italy) Virtus Bologna	74	81	155
(Germany) Brose Bamberg	81	88	169
(Turkey) Banvit	79	85	164
(Greece) PAOK	75	63	138
(Greece) AEK	84	62	146
(Lithuania) Neptūnas	74	64	138
(Israel) Hapoel Jerusalem	86	84	170
(Greece) Promitheas	69	57	126
(Spain) Iberostar Tenerife	57	79	136
(Russia) Nizhny Novgorod	95	66	161
(Italy) Umana Reyer Venezia	72	84	156
(Belgium) Telenet Giants	75	77	152
(Spain) UCAM Murcia	67	78	145

Quarterfinals
(France) Nanterre 92	83	58	141
(Italy) Virtus Bologna	75	73	148
(Germany) Brose Bamberg	71	67	138
(Greece) AEK	67	69	136
(Israel) Hapoel Jerusalem	75	64	139
(Spain) Iberostar Tenerife	73	81	154
(Russia) Nizhny Novgorod	68	61	129
(Belgium) Telenet Giants	83	66	149

Semifinals
(Italy) Virtus Bologna	67
(Germany) Brose Bamberg	50
(Spain) Iberostar Tenerife	70
(Belgium) Telenet Antwerp Giants	54

Final
(Italy) Virtus Bologna	73
(Spain) Iberostar Tenerife	61
Third place
(Germany) Brose Bamberg	58
(Belgium) Telenet Antwerp Giants	72

== Round of 16 ==
The first legs will be played on 5–6 March, and the second legs will be played on 12–13 March 2019.

Team 1	Agg.	Team 2	1st leg	2nd leg
Brose Bamberg (Germany)	169–164	(Turkey) Banvit	81–79	88–85
Nanterre 92 (France)	130–119	(Turkey) Beşiktaş Sompo Japan	68–59	62–60
Neptūnas (Lithuania)	138–170	(Israel) Hapoel Jerusalem	74–86	64–84
Nizhny Novgorod (Russia)	161–156	(Italy) Umana Reyer Venezia	95–72	66–84
PAOK (Greece)	138–146	(Greece) AEK	75–84	63–62
Promitheas (Greece)	126–136	(Spain) Iberostar Tenerife	69–57	57–79
Le Mans Sarthe (France)	132–155	(Italy) Segafredo Virtus Bologna	74–74	58–81
Telenet Giants Antwerp (Belgium)	152–145	(Spain) UCAM Murcia	75–67	77–78

=== First leg ===
5 March 2019	Nizhny Novgorod (Russia)	95–72	(Italy) Umana Reyer Venezia	Nizhny Novgorod
19:00	Scoring by quarter: 23–18, 22–10, 26–24, 24–20
	Pts: Perry 34; Rebs: Dragičević 6 Asts: Perry 6 Eff: Perry 29	Boxscore	Pts: Bramos 17; Rebs: Bramos 5 Asts: De Nicolao 5 Eff: Bramos 18	Arena: Trade Union Sport Palace; Attendance: 1,868; Referees: Yener Yılmaz (TUR), Dariusz Zapolski (POL), Luis Castillo (ESP)

5 March 2019	PAOK (Greece)	75–84	(Greece) AEK	Thessaloniki
19:30	Scoring by quarter: 11–30, 25–15, 10–20, 29–19
	Pts: Koniaris 18; Rebs: Garrett 8 Asts: Koniaris 4 Eff: Koniaris 18	Boxscore	Pts: Hunter 20; Rebs: Hunter 12; Asts: Theodore 7 Eff: Hunter 28	Arena: PAOK Sports Arena; Attendance: 6,000; Referees: Aleksandar Glišić (SRB), Marius Ciulin (ROU), Sergiy Zashchuk (UKR)

5 March 2019	Le Mans Sarthe (France)	74–74	(Italy) Segafredo Virtus Bologna	Le Mans
20:30	Scoring by quarter: 21–24, 17–16, 17–19, 19–15
	Pts: Bigote 25; Rebs: Clark 9 Asts: Ray 4 Eff: Bigote 28	Boxscore	Pts: M'Baye, Taylor 13; Rebs: Moreira 9 Asts: Taylor 6 Eff: Taylor 20	Arena: Antarès; Attendance: 3,500; Referees: Mārtiņš Kozlovskis (LAT), Fernando Calatrava (ESP), Michał Proc (POL)

6 March 2019	Neptūnas (Lithuania)	74–86	(Israel) Hapoel Jerusalem	Klaipėda
19:00	Scoring by quarter: 14–23, 27–20, 13–18, 20–25
	Pts: Delininkaitis 16; Rebs: Grant 8 Asts: Weaver, Williams 4 Eff: Delininkaitis 15	Boxscore	Pts: Feldeine 17; Rebs: Butler 8 Asts: Blatt 10; Eff: Butler, Thomas 19	Arena: Švyturio Arena; Attendance: 3,854; Referees: Yohan Rosso (FRA), Saverio Lanzarini (ITA), Carsten Straube (GER)

6 March 2019	Promitheas (Greece)	69–57	(Spain) Iberostar Tenerife	Patras
19:30	Scoring by quarter: 21–15, 26–16, 10–14, 12–12
	Pts: Meier 22; Rebs: Ellis 10; Asts: Kaselakis, Katsivelis 4 Eff: Meier 22	Boxscore	Pts: Iverson 16; Rebs: Iverson 6 Asts: Iverson, San Miguel 2 Eff: Iverson 17	Arena: Dimitris Tofalos Arena; Referees: Manuel Mazzoni (ITA), Boris Krejič (SLO), Tolga Sahin (ITA)

6 March 2019	Brose Bamberg (Germany)	81–79	(Turkey) Banvit	Bamberg
20:00	Scoring by quarter: 23–18, 22–28, 19–20, 17–13
	Pts: Rice 20; Rebs: Alexander 10; Asts: Rice 5 Eff: Harris 21	Boxscore	Pts: Neal 20; Rebs: Morgan 12; Asts: Pérez 8 Eff: Pérez 27	Arena: Brose Arena; Attendance: 5,297; Referees: Antonio Conde (ESP), Tanel Suslov (EST), Zdenko Tomasovic (SVK)

6 March 2019	Telenet Antwerp Giants (Belgium)	75–67	(Spain) UCAM Murcia	Antwerp
20:00	Scoring by quarter: 23–12, 22–19, 14–20, 16–16
	Pts: Lee 21; Rebs: Bako 6 Asts: Lee 5 Eff: Lee, Bako 17	Boxscore	Pts: Booker 18; Rebs: Rojas 10; Asts: Doyle 5 Eff: Soko 17	Arena: Lotto Arena; Attendance: 4,037; Referees: Georgios Poursanidis (GRE), Oskars Lucis (LAT), Martin Horozov (BUL)

6 March 2019	Nanterre 92 (France)	68–59	(Turkey) Beşiktaş Sompo Japan	Nanterre
20:30	Scoring by quarter: 16–18, 18–9, 19–18, 15–14
	Pts: Konaté 13; Rebs: Pálsson 8 Asts: Konaté 6 Eff: Konaté 19	Boxscore	Pts: Buva, Gibson 10; Rebs: Buva 14; Asts: Pressey 6 Eff: Buva 16	Arena: Maurice Thorez; Attendance: 2,215; Referees: Srđan Dožai (CRO), Gentian Cici (ALB), Martin Vulic (CRO)

=== Second leg ===
12 March 2019	Beşiktaş Sompo Japan (Turkey)	60–62 (119–130 agg.)	(France) Nanterre 92	Istanbul
18:00	Scoring by quarter: 14–7, 12–17, 14–20, 20–18
	Pts: Pressey 17; Rebs: Buva, Yıldızlı 8 Asts: Sipahi 4 Eff: Pressey, Yıldızlı 14	Boxscore	Pts: Senglin 18; Rebs: Treadwell 10; Asts: Konate, Gamble 4 Eff: Senglin 18	Arena: Akatlar Arena; Attendance: 686; Referees: Sergiy Zashchuk (UKR), Oskars Lucis (LAT), Ademir Zurapović (BIH)

12 March 2019	Umana Reyer Venezia (Italy)	84–66 (156–161 agg.)	(Russia) Nizhny Novgorod	Venice
20:30	Scoring by quarter: 19–12, 18–19, 23–19, 24–16
	Pts: Tonut 26; Rebs: Watt 11; Asts: Daye 4 Eff: Tonut 20	Boxscore	Pts: Dragičević 21; Rebs: Hummer, Dragičević 8 Asts: Perry 4 Eff: Dragičević 28	Arena: Palasport Giuseppe Taliercio; Attendance: 3,423; Referees: Georgios Poursanidis (GRE), Tomas Jasevičius (LTU), Martin Horozov (BUL)

13 March 2019	Banvit (Turkey)	85–88 (164–169 agg.)	(Germany) Brose Bamberg	Bandırma
18:00	Scoring by quarter: 23–23, 17–23, 20–21, 25–21
	Pts: Morgan 23; Rebs: Morgan 14; Asts: Pérez 8 Eff: Morgan 32	Boxscore	Pts: Rice 32; Rebs: Alexander 7 Asts: three players 4 Eff: Rice 28	Arena: Kara Ali Acar Sport Hall; Attendance: 2,210; Referees: Boris Krejič (SLO), Lorenzo Baldini (ITA), Luis Castillo (SPA)

13 March 2019	AEK (Greece)	62–63 (146–138 agg.)	(Greece) PAOK	Athens
18:30	Scoring by quarter: 18–14, 14–13, 13–20, 17–16
	Pts: Hunter 11; Rebs: Hunter, James 7 Asts: Sant-Roos, Theodore 3 Eff: Hunter 16	Boxscore	Pts: Jefferson 11; Rebs: Jefferson 9 Asts: Hatcher, Goss 4 Eff: Jefferson 20	Arena: Nikos Galis Olympic Indoor Hall; Attendance: 14,000; Referees: Antonio Conde (SPA), Yohan Rosso (FRA), Saverio Lanzarini (ITA)

13 March 2019	Hapoel Jerusalem (Israel)	84–64 (170–138 agg.)	(Lithuania) Neptūnas	Jerusalem
18:45	Scoring by quarter: 20–16, 16–13, 27–21, 21–14
	Pts: Stoudemire 15; Rebs: Thomas 8 Asts: Blatt 10; Eff: Thomas 20	Boxscore	Pts: Grant 14; Rebs: Weaver 7 Asts: Williams 7 Eff: Grant 16	Arena: Pais Arena; Attendance: 6,748; Referees: Manuel Mazzoni (ITA), Yener Yılmaz (TUR), Kerem Baki (TUR)

13 March 2019	UCAM Murcia (Spain)	78–77 (145–152 agg.)	(Belgium) Telenet Antwerp Giants	Murcia
20:30	Scoring by quarter: 26–19, 16–18, 19–16, 17–24
	Pts: Booker 14; Rebs: Soko 10; Asts: Booker 11; Eff: Booker 20	Boxscore	Pts: Kalinoski 16; Rebs: Bako 5 Asts: Lee 4 Eff: Bako 17	Arena: Palacio de Deportes; Attendance: 5,021; Referees: Panagiotis Anastopoulos (GRE), Mārtiņš Kozlovskis (LAT), Janusz Calik (POL)

13 March 2019	Iberostar Tenerife (Spain)	79–57 (136–126 agg.)	(Greece) Promitheas	San Cristóbal de La Laguna
20:30	Scoring by quarter: 27–14, 17–9, 20–18, 15–16
	Pts: Saiz, Abromaitis 13; Rebs: Saiz 6 Asts: Bassas, White 4 Eff: Saiz 20	Boxscore	Pts: Brown 20; Rebs: Brown 6 Asts: Katsivelis 3 Eff: Brown 17	Arena: Santiago Martín; Attendance: 4,148; Referees: Aleksandar Glišić (SRB), Srđan Dožai (CRO), Wojciech Liszka (POL)

13 March 2019	Segafredo Virtus Bologna (Italy)	81–58 (155–132 agg.)	(France) Le Mans Sarthe	Bologna
20:30	Scoring by quarter: 25–10, 18–15, 20–10, 18–23
	Pts: Kravić 16; Rebs: M'Baye 6 Asts: Taylor 8 Eff: Taylor 19	Boxscore	Pts: Thompson 13; Rebs: Yeguete 10; Asts: Ray 4 Eff: Yeguete 12	Arena: PalaDozza; Attendance: 4,541; Referees: Marius Ciulin (ROU), Andris Aunkrogers (LAT), Steve Bittner (GER)

== Quarterfinals ==
The first legs will be played on 27 March, and the second legs will be played on 3 April 2019.

Team 1	Agg.	Team 2	1st leg	2nd leg
Hapoel Jerusalem (Israel)	139–154	(Spain) Iberostar Tenerife	75–73	64–81
Nizhny Novgorod (Russia)	129–149	(Belgium) Telenet Giants Antwerp	68–83	61–66
Nanterre 92 (France)	141–148	(Italy) Segafredo Virtus Bologna	83–75	58–73
Brose Bamberg (Germany)	138–136	(Greece) AEK	71–67	67–69

=== First leg ===
27 March 2019	Nizhny Novgorod (Russia)	68–83	(Belgium) Telenet Giants Antwerp	Nizhny Novgorod
17:00	Scoring by quarter: 21–27, 21–15, 10–20, 16–21
	Pts: Perry 17; Rebs: Dragičević 6 Asts: Perry 8 Eff: Baburin, Perry 17	Boxscore	Pts: Lee 24; Rebs: Vanwijn 7 Asts: Kalinoski 3 Eff: Lee 27	Arena: Trade Union Sport Palace; Attendance: 2,048; Referees: Aleksandar Glišić (SRB), Ademir Zurapović (BIH), Radomir Vojinović (MNE)

27 March 2019	Hapoel Jerusalem (Israel)	75–73	(Spain) Iberostar Tenerife	Jerusalem
19:30	Scoring by quarter: 22–17, 23–19, 10–23, 20–14
	Pts: Brown 20; Rebs: Thomas 7 Asts: Blatt 9 Eff: Feldeine 19	Boxscore	Pts: Iverson 20; Rebs: Iverson 12; Asts: Brussino 4 Eff: Iverson 24	Arena: Pais Arena; Attendance: 7,816; Referees: Panagiotis Anastopoulos (GRE), Sergiy Zashchuk (UKR), Oskars Lucis (LAT)

27 March 2019	Brose Bamberg (Germany)	71–67	(Greece) AEK	Bamberg
20:00	Scoring by quarter: 11–10, 17–20, 21–20, 22–17
	Pts: Alexander 19; Rebs: Alexander, Heckmann 7 Asts: Hickman, Zisis 5 Eff: Alexander 21	Boxscore	Pts: Šakota 15; Rebs: three players 6 Asts: Sant-Roos 4 Eff: Larentzakis 20	Arena: Brose Arena; Attendance: 5,757; Referees: Manuel Mazzoni (ITA), Martins Kozlovskis (LAT), Janusz Calik (POL)

27 March 2019	Nanterre 92 (France)	83–75	(Italy) Segafredo Virtus Bologna	Nanterre
20:30	Scoring by quarter: 20–18, 20–21, 22–20, 21–16
	Pts: Senglin 16; Rebs: Gamble 12; Asts: Juškevičius 8 Eff: Senglin 20	Boxscore	Pts: Punter 15; Rebs: Baldi Rossi 9 Asts: Chalmers 5 Eff: Baldi Rossi, Chalmers 12	Arena: Maurice Thorez; Attendance: 3,000; Referees: Antonio Conde (ESP), Georgios Poursanidis (GRE), Tomas Jasevicius (LTU)

=== Second leg ===
3 April 2019	AEK (Greece)	69–67 (136–138 agg.)	(Germany) Brose Bamberg	Athens
18:30	Scoring by quarter: 20–17, 16–15, 18–17, 15–18
	Pts: Hunter 19; Rebs: Hunter 11; Asts: Theodore 7 Eff: Hunter 27	Boxscore	Pts: Rice 25; Rebs: Rubit 10; Asts: Rice, Zisis 5 Eff: Alexander 16	Arena: Nikos Galis Olympic Indoor Hall; Attendance: 17,000; Referees: Aleksandar Glišić (SRB), Sergiy Zashchuk (UKR), Oskars Lucis (LAT)

3 April 2019	Telenet Giants Antwerp (Belgium)	66–61 (149–129 agg.)	(Russia) Nizhny Novgorod	Antwerp
20:00	Scoring by quarter: 19–12, 22–17, 16–17, 9–15
	Pts: Tate 11; Rebs: Tate 7 Asts: Vanwijn 4 Eff: Kalinoski, Vanwijn 15	Boxscore	Pts: Dragičević 16; Rebs: Dragičević 10; Asts: three players 2 Eff: Dragičević 22	Arena: Lotto Arena; Attendance: 4,441; Referees: Antonio Conde (ESP), Marius Ciulin (ROU), Yener Yılmaz (TUR)

3 April 2019	Iberostar Tenerife (Spain)	81–64 (154–139 agg.)	(Israel) Hapoel Jerusalem	San Cristóbal de La Laguna
20:30	Scoring by quarter: 24–10, 16–16, 22–17, 19–21
	Pts: Abromaitis 21; Rebs: Iverson 8 Asts: San Miguel 4 Eff: Abromaitis 23	Boxscore	Pts: Feldeine 20; Rebs: Thomas 11; Asts: Brown 5 Eff: Feldeine, Thomas 11	Arena: Santiago Martín; Attendance: 4,838; Referees: Yohan Rosso (FRA), Saverio Lanzarini (ITA), Tolga Sahin (ITA)

3 April 2019	Segafredo Virtus Bologna (Italy)	73–58 (148–141 agg.)	(France) Nanterre 92	Bologna
20:30	Scoring by quarter: 17–12, 24–17, 17–15, 15–14
	Pts: M'Baye 16; Rebs: Qvale 7 Asts: Punter 5 Eff: Kravić 20	Boxscore	Pts: Pálsson 18; Rebs: Treadwell 9 Asts: Juškevičius 3 Eff: Pálsson 12	Arena: PalaDozza; Attendance: 4,482; Referees: Srđan Dožai (CRO), Panagiotis Anastopoulos (GRE), Martins Kozlovskis (LAT)

== Final Four ==
Semifinals
3 May
(Italy) Segafredo Virtus Bologna	67
(Germany) Brose Bamberg	50
3 May
(Spain) Iberostar Tenerife	70
(Belgium) Telenet Antwerp Giants	54

Final
5 May
(Italy) Segafredo Virtus Bologna	73
(Spain) Iberostar Tenerife	61
Third place game
5 May
(Germany) Brose Bamberg	58
(Belgium) Telenet Antwerp Giants	72
