= 2019 Basketball Champions League Final Four =

Third Basketball Champions League tournament

- Season: 2018–19 season

Tournament details
- Arena: Sportpaleis; Antwerp, Belgium
- Dates: 3–5 May 2018

Final positions
- Champions: (Italy) Virtus Bologna; 1st title
- Runners-up: (Spain) Iberostar Tenerife
- Third place: (Belgium) Telenet Giants Antwerp
- Fourth place: (Germany) Brose Bamberg

Awards and statistics
- MVP: (United States) Kevin Punter
- Top scorer(s): (United States) Kevin Punter (47)
- Attendance: 65,663 (16,416 per game)

The 2019 Basketball Champions League (BCL) Final Four was the third Basketball Champions League tournament. It was the concluding phase of the 2018–19 Basketball Champions League season.

== Venue ==
The Sportpaleis hosted the final tournament for the first time.

Antwerp	2019 Basketball Champions League Final Four (Europe)
Sportpaleis	2019 Basketball Champions League Final Four (Europe)
Capacity: 18,500	2019 Basketball Champions League Final Four (Europe)

== Teams ==
=== Road to the Final Four ===
Club	Clinched Final Four	Season performance								
Club	Clinched Final Four	Regular season record	Round of 16				Quarterfinals			
(Spain) Iberostar Tenerife	3 April 2019	12–2 (1st Group B)	(Greece) Promitheas	136–126	57–69 (A)	79–57 (H)	(Israel) Hapoel Jerusalem	154–139	73–75 (A)	81–64 (H)
(Italy) Segafredo Virtus Bologna	3 April 2019	10–4 (1st Group D)	(France) Le Mans Sarthe	155–132	74–74 (A)	81–58 (H)	(France) Nanterre 92	148–141	75–83 (A)	73–58 (H)
(Germany) Brose Bamberg	3 April 2019	9–5 (3rd Group C)	(Turkey) Banvit	169–164	81–79 (H)	88–85 (A)	(Greece) AEK	138–136	71–67 (H)	67–69 (A)
(Belgium) Telenet Giants Antwerp	3 April 2019	7–7 (4th Group C)	(Spain) UCAM Murcia	152–145	75–67 (H)	77–78 (A)	(Russia) Nizhny Novgorod	149–129	83–68 (A)	66–61 (H)

=== Background ===
Information
Team	Domestic competition	Position (Record) (Note: As of the start of the Final Four, 3 May 2019)	Head coach	Leading scorer
(Belgium) Telenet Giants Antwerp	Pro Basketball League	2nd (24–6)	Roel Moors	Paris Lee (13.7)
(Italy) Segafredo Virtus Bologna	LBA	11th (14–15)	Aleksandar Đorđević	Kevin Punter (15.1)
(Germany) Brose Bamberg	Basketball Bundesliga	5th (20–11)	Federico Perego	Tyrese Rice (16.6)
(Spain) Iberostar Tenerife	Liga ACB	9th (15–15)	Txus Vidorreta	Tim Abromaitis (11.3)

==== Telenet Giants Antwerp ====
Antwerp qualified for its first ever final phase of a European competition and were the second team ever to reach the final four after playing all qualifying rounds, after Riesen Ludwigsburg in 2018. In its domestic Pro Basketball League (PBL), Antwerp was having a terrific year as it was in second position. In 2018–19, Antwerp also won its first Belgian Basketball Cup in history.

==== Segafredo Virtus Bologna ====
Bologna qualified for the Champions League as the ninth best team in the Italian Lega Basket Serie A (LBA). In its 2018–19 domestic season, it was in eleventh position as of 16 April 2019. Leading scorer Kevin Punter won the Champions League in 2018, while playing for AEK.

==== Brose Bamberg ====
After playing in EuroLeague Basketball competitions for years, Bamberg made its debut in the Champions League. It also won the 2019 BBL-Pokal in the 2018–19 season.

==== Iberostar Tenerife ====
Tenerife made its return to the Final Four for the second time, after winning the tournament in 2017.

== Bracket ==
Semifinals
3 May
(Italy) Segafredo Virtus Bologna	67
(Germany) Brose Bamberg	50
3 May
(Spain) Iberostar Tenerife	70
(Belgium) Telenet Antwerp Giants	54

Final
5 May
(Italy) Segafredo Virtus Bologna	73
(Spain) Iberostar Tenerife	61
Third place game
5 May
(Germany) Brose Bamberg	58
(Belgium) Telenet Antwerp Giants	72

== Semifinals ==
=== Segafredo Virtus Bologna vs Brose Bamberg ===
3 May 2019	Segafredo Virtus Bologna (Italy)	67–50	(Germany) Brose Bamberg	Antwerp
18:30	Scoring by quarter: 22–11, 20–17, 11–11, 14–11
	Pts: Punter 21; Rebs: Moreira 9 Asts: Taylor 5 Eff: Punter 21	Boxscore	Pts: Rice 21; Rebs: Alexander 9 Asts: Zisis 2 Eff: Harris 9	Arena: Sportpaleis; Attendance: 15,500; Referees: Yohan Rosso (FRA), Mārtiņš Kozlovskis (LAT), Oskars Lucis (LAT)

Starters:			Pts	Reb	Ast
PG	7	(United States) Tony Taylor	5	3	5
SG	0	(United States) Kevin Punter	21	8	2
SF	1	(United States) Kelvin Martin	2	3	1
PF	24	(France) Amath M'Baye	9	2	0
C	2	(Angola) Yanick Moreira	5	9	1
Reserves:					
PG	6	(Italy) Alessandro Pajola	0	0	0
F/C	8	(Italy) Filippo Baldi Rossi	5	3	0
PG	9	(Italy) Alessandro Cappelletti	DNP		
C	11	(Serbia) Dejan Kravić	8	6	0
G	15	(United States) Mario Chalmers	5	3	2
G/F	21	(Italy) Pietro Aradori	9	2	0
G	25	(Italy) David Cournooh	1	1	0
Head coach:
(Serbia) Aleksandar Đorđević

Bologna	Bamberg

Bologna	Statistics	Bamberg
18/48 (37.5%)	2-pt field goals	12/43 (27.9%)
6/18 (33.3%)	3-pt field goals	5/23 (21.7%)
13/20 (65%)	Free throws	11/14 (78.6%)
14	Offensive rebounds	16
33	Defensive rebounds	29
47	Total rebounds	45
12	Assists	4
11	Turnovers	16
10	Steals	8
3	Blocks	5
21	Fouls	18

Starters:			Pts	Reb	Ast
PG	4	(Montenegro) Tyrese Rice	21	3	2
SG	6	(Greece) Nikos Zisis	4	3	2
SF	33	(Germany) Patrick Heckmann	2	8	1
PF	16	(Germany) Louis Olinde	0	5	0
C	22	(United States) Cliff Alexander	3	9	0
Reserves:					
G	2	(United States) Ricky Hickman	4	3	2
G	9	(Germany) Maurice Stuckey	DNP		
PG	13	(Germany) Daniel Schmidt	DNP		
G/F	20	(Germany) Elias Harris	9	5	1
PF	21	(United States) Augustine Rubit	5	7	0
SG	44	(United States) Bryce Taylor	2	1	0
SG	98	(Lithuania) Arnoldas Kulboka	DNP		
Head coach:
(Italy) Federico Perego

=== Iberostar Tenerife vs Telenet Giants Antwerp ===
3 May 2019	Iberostar Tenerife (Spain)	70–54	(Belgium) Telenet Giants Antwerp	Antwerp
21:15	Scoring by quarter: 12–20, 19–6, 16–16, 23–12
	Pts: Brussino 17; Rebs: Gillet 6 Asts: San Miguel 8 Eff: Brussino 22	Boxscore	Pts: Kalinoski, Tate 13; Rebs: Bako 10; Asts: Lee 4 Eff: Bako 15	Arena: Sportpaleis; Attendance: 17,289; Referees: Aleksandar Glišić (SRB), Georgios Poursanidis (GRE), Ademir Zurapović (BIH)

Starters:			Pts	Reb	Ast
PG	00	(Spain) Rodrigo San Miguel	4	0	8
SG	5	(Argentina) Nicolás Richotti	0	1	0
SF	9	(Argentina) Nicolás Brussino	17	4	3
PF	21	(United States) Tim Abromaitis	5	5	1
C	4	(United States) Colton Iverson	5	5	1
Reserves:					
SG	1	(Germany) Lucca Staiger	0	0	0
C	7	(Senegal) Mamadou Niang	7	3	1
PG	10	(Spain) Ferrán Bassas	2	0	1
C	11	(Spain) Sebastian Saiz	2	0	0
PF	31	(Belgium) Pierre-Antoine Gillet	11	6	0
SF	33	(Spain) Javier Beirán	14	4	2
PG	34	(United States) Davin White	3	0	2
Head coach:
(Spain) Txus Vidorreta

Tenerife	Antwerp

Tenerife	Statistics	Antwerp
16/29 (55.2%)	2-pt Field goals	15/33 (45.5%)
9/22 (40.9%)	3-pt field goals	5/22 (22.7%)
11/19 (57.9%)	Free throws	9/18 (50%)
10	Offensive rebounds	13
26	Defensive rebounds	20
36	Total rebounds	33
19	Assists	12
14	Turnovers	15
8	Steals	7
3	Blocks	1
20	Fouls	21

Starters:			Pts	Reb	Ast
PG	5	(United States) Paris Lee	4	3	4
SG	11	(United States) Victor Sanders	2	0	2
SF	24	(United States) Tyler Kalinoski	13	1	1
PF	13	(Belgium) Yoeri Schoepen	3	1	0
C	21	(Belgium) Ismaël Bako	7	10	2
Reserves:					
SG	7	(Belgium) Dennis Donkor	0	0	0
SF	8	(United States) Jae'Sean Tate	13	4	1
PF	10	(Belgium) Hans Vanwijn	0	4	1
PG	20	(Belgium) Thomas Akyazili	1	1	0
PF	23	(United States) Dave Dudzinski	7	1	1
C	31	(United States) Trevor Thompson	4	1	0
C	33	(Nigeria) Moses Kingsley	0	0	0
Head coach:
(Belgium) Roel Moors

== Third place game ==
5 May 2019	Brose Bamberg (Germany)	58–72	(Belgium) Telenet Giants Antwerp	Antwerp, Belgium
15:00	Scoring by quarter: 18–15, 8–22, 16–14, 16–21
	Pts: Olinde 12; Rebs: Rubit 10; Asts: Hickman 5 PIR: Olinde 19	Boxscore	Pts: Tate 16; Rebs: Tate 7 Asts: Lee 5 PIR: Tate 20	Arena: Sportpaleis; Attendance: 16,437; Referees: Aleksandar Glišić (SRB), Sergiy Zashchuk (UKR), Yener Yılmaz (TUR)

Starters:			Pts	Reb	Ast
PG	4	(Montenegro) Tyrese Rice	8	0	3
SG	13	(Germany) Daniel Schmidt	0	2	3
SF	33	(Germany) Patrick Heckmann	0	0	0
PF	16	(Germany) Louis Olinde	12	6	2
C	22	(United States) Cliff Alexander	0	9	0
Reserves:					
G	2	(United States) Ricky Hickman	4	3	5
SG	6	(Greece) Nikos Zisis	6	1	0
G	9	(Germany) Maurice Stuckey	4	1	1
G/F	20	(Germany) Elias Harris	6	5	0
PF	21	(United States) Augustine Rubit	8	10	1
SG	44	(United States) Bryce Taylor	0	1	0
SG	98	(Lithuania) Arnoldas Kulboka	10	2	0
Head coach:
(Italy) Federico Perego

Bamberg	Antwerp

Bamberg	Statistics	Antwerp
17/40 (42.5%)	2-pt field goals	18/43 (41.9%)
5/21 (23.8%)	3-pt field goals	9/27 (33.3%)
9/14 (64.3%)	Free throws	9/16 (56.2%)
11	Offensive rebounds	14
33	Defensive rebounds	27
44	Total rebounds	41
15	Assists	18
12	Turnovers	6
3	Steals	7
3	Blocks	1
21	Fouls	19

Starters:			Pts	Reb	Ast
PG	5	(United States) Paris Lee	3	3	5
SG	11	(United States) Victor Sanders	8	2	0
SF	24	(United States) Tyler Kalinoski	10	2	0
PF	13	(Belgium) Yoeri Schoepen	2	4	1
C	21	(Belgium) Ismaël Bako	5	2	2
Reserves:					
SG	7	(Belgium) Dennis Donkor	0	0	0
SF	8	(United States) Jae'Sean Tate	16	7	3
PF	10	(Belgium) Hans Vanwijn	9	5	2
PG	20	(Belgium) Thomas Akyazili	8	2	3
PF	23	(United States) Dave Dudzinski	4	3	2
C	31	(United States) Trevor Thompson	0	0	0
C	33	(Nigeria) Moses Kingsley	7	5	0
Head coach:
(Belgium) Roel Moors

== Final ==
5 May 2019	Segafredo Virtus Bologna (Italy)	73–61	(Spain) Iberostar Tenerife	Antwerp, Belgium
18:00	Scoring by quarter: 20–8, 18–16, 20–20, 15–17
	Pts: Punter 26; Rebs: Punter 7 Asts: Taylor 5 PIR: Punter 29	Boxscore	Pts: Abromaitis 18; Rebs: Iverson 9 Asts: Beirán 3 PIR: Abromaitis 21	Arena: Sportpaleis; Attendance: 16,437; Referees: Yohan Rosso (FRA), Mārtiņš Kozlovskis (LAT), Georgios Poursanidis (GRE)

Starters:			Pts	Reb	Ast
PG	7	(United States) Tony Taylor	4	3	5
SG	0	(United States) Kevin Punter	26	7	1
SF	1	(United States) Kelvin Martin	2	2	1
PF	24	(France) Amath M'Baye	16	3	0
C	2	(Angola) Yanick Moreira	4	4	0
Reserves:					
PG	6	(Italy) Alessandro Pajola	DNP		
F/C	8	(Italy) Filippo Baldi Rossi	0	2	0
PG	9	(Italy) Alessandro Cappelletti	DNP		
C	11	(Serbia) Dejan Kravić	4	5	0
G	15	(United States) Mario Chalmers	8	2	2
G/F	21	(Italy) Pietro Aradori	9	1	1
G	25	(Italy) David Cournooh	0	1	0
Head coach:
(Serbia) Aleksandar Đorđević

Bologna	Tenerife

Bologna	Statistics	Tenerife
17/38 (44.7%)	2-pt field goals	13/28 (46.4%)
7/16 (43.8%)	3-pt field goals	5/37 (13.5%)
18/26 (69.2%)	Free throws	20/23 (87%)
11	Offensive rebounds	24
21	Defensive rebounds	20
32	Total rebounds	44
10	Assists	11
15	Turnovers	20
8	Steals	6
3	Blocks	1
26	Fouls	29

2018–19 Basketball Champions League champions

Segafredo Virtus Bologna
1st title

Starters:			Pts	Reb	Ast
PG	00	(Spain) Rodrigo San Miguel	3	2	1
SG	1	(Germany) Lucca Staiger	3	1	0
SF	9	(Argentina) Nicolás Brussino	2	1	0
PF	21	(United States) Tim Abromaitis	18	8	2
C	4	(United States) Colton Iverson	11	9	0
Reserves:					
SG	5	(Argentina) Nicolás Richotti	DNP		
C	7	(Senegal) Mamadou Niang	2	4	1
PG	10	(Spain) Ferrán Bassas	5	2	2
C	11	(Spain) Sebastian Saiz	1	2	0
PF	31	(Belgium) Pierre-Antoine Gillet	3	2	2
SF	33	(Spain) Javier Beirán	9	7	3
PG	34	(United States) Davin White	4	0	0
Head coach:
(Spain) Txus Vidorreta
