= Garlon Green =

American basketball player (born 1991)

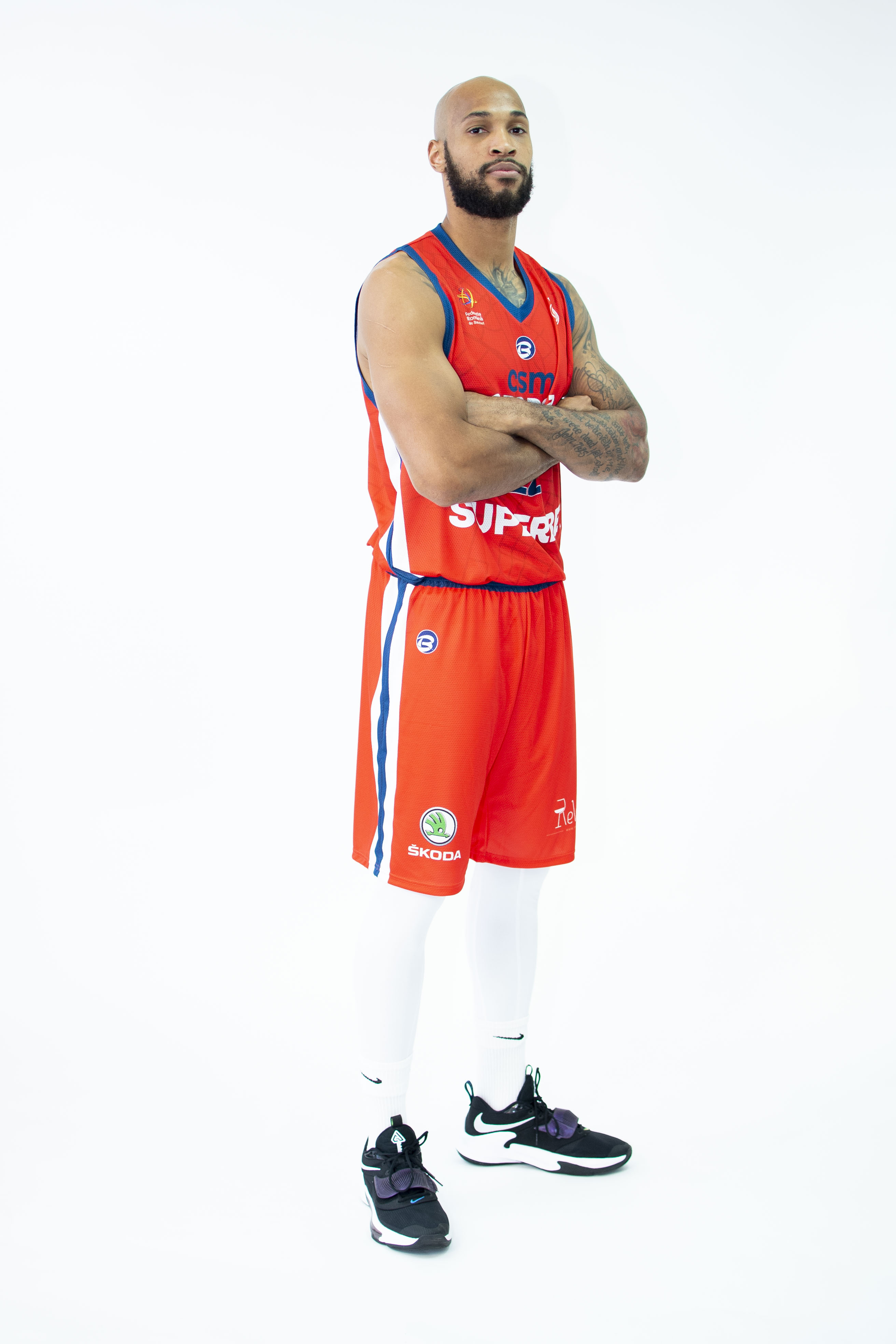
- Green with CSM U Oradea in 2022

Personal information
- Born: January 11, 1991 (age 35) Houston, Texas, U.S.
- Listed height: 6 ft 7 in (2.01 m)
- Listed weight: 215 lb (98 kg)

Career information
- High school: Hightower (Missouri City, Texas)
- College: TCU (2009–2013)
- NBA draft: 2013: undrafted
- Playing career: 2013–present
- Position: Small forward / shooting guard

Career history
- 2014: Canberra Gunners
- 2014–2015: Kumamoto Volters
- 2015–2016: Walter Tigers Tübingen
- 2017–2018: Belfius Mons-Hainaut
- 2018–2019: Khimki
- 2019: Hapoel Tel Aviv
- 2019–2020: BC Enisey
- 2020: Anwil Włocławek
- 2020–2022: CSM Oradea
- 2022–2023: Fos Provence Basket
- 2023–2026: Antibes Sharks

Career highlights
- BBL All-Star (2016); BLB All-Offensive Team (2018); BBL Dunk Contest Winner (2016)
- Stats at Basketball Reference

Garlon Everett Green (born January 11, 1991) is an American professional basketball player who last played for Antibes Sharks of the French Élite 2. After completing his collegiate eligibility, Green started his professional career with Australian second division team Canberra Gunners, before signing for the Japanese team Kumamoto Volters. In 2015 Garlon signed a contract for the 2015–16 season with the Walter Tigers Tübingen of the German Basketball Bundesliga. He is the younger brother of NBA player Gerald Green. Green participated in the BBL All-Star Game in 2016 and was the winner of the slam dunk contest.

== College career ==
After graduating from high school in his hometown, Green studied at Texas Christian University and played for the TCU Horned Frogs team. He participated in the 2013 NCAA Slam Dunk Contest.

== Professional career ==
=== Canberra Gunners (2014) ===
After completing his studies, Green played for the Texas Legends of the NBA Development League. Green, however, did not enter the season squad and at the end of the year he signed a contract with the Canberra Gunners of the South East Australian Basketball League.

=== Kumamoto Volters (2014–2015) ===
After averaging 24 points and seven rebounds per game for the Gunners, Green signed with the Kumamoto Volters of the Japan's National Basketball League.

=== Tübingen (2015–2016) ===
For the 2015–16 season, Green signed with the Walter Tigers Tübingen of the Basketball Bundesliga (BBL), where he played with Houston native Jesse Sanders. Green attracted attention a game against Basketball Löwen Braunschweig, where he scored a missed free throw of an opponent in the final second, according to his own statement without any intention, in his own basket and created the "drunken self-spark". This erratic action was observed even in his homeland and commented in the weekly segment Shaqtin' a Fool of the Inside the NBA show. Green participated in the BBL All-Star Game in 2016 and won its slam dunk contest. He also played in the All-Star Game where he replaced the injured Augustine Rubit. In December 2016, Green and the Walter Tigers Tübingen parted ways

=== Belfius Mons-Hainaut (2017–2018) ===
In February 2017, Green signed with Belfius Mons-Hainaut of Belgium's Pro Basketball League.

=== Khimki (2018–2019) ===
Green played for the New Orleans Pelicans in the 2018 NBA Summer League, and on July 24, signed a contract with the Pelicans. The Pelicans waived him on October 13. On November 8, Green signed a one-year deal with Khimki of the VTB United League and EuroLeague. On February 14, 2019, Green parted ways with Khimki after appearing in 15 games.

=== Hapoel Tel Aviv (2019) ===
On February 20, 2019, Green signed with Hapoel Tel Aviv of the Israeli Premier League for the rest of the season. On March 31, 2019, Green recorded a season-high 22 points, shooting 6-of-13 from the field, along with four rebounds in a 102–96 win over Hapoel Be'er Sheva. Green helped Hapoel reach the 2019 Israeli League Playoffs, where they eventually were eliminated by Maccabi Tel Aviv in the Quarterfinals.

=== Enisey (2019–2020) ===
On August 5, 2019, Green signed with BC Enisey of the VTB United League.

=== Wloclawek (2020) ===
On July 25, 2020, Green signed with Anwil Włocławek of the Polish Basketball League (PLK).

=== Oradea (2020–2022) ===
On December 21, 2020, Green signed with CSM Oradea of the Liga Națională. He averaged 10.2 points, 4.6 rebounds, and 1.3 assists per game. He won bronze medals on FIBA Europe Cup, and was runner up in the domestic competition. On July 23, 2021, Green re-signed with the team.

=== Fos Provence Basket (2022–2023) ===
On July 6, 2022, he signed with Fos Provence Basket of the LNB Pro A.

=== Tri-State (2022–present) ===
On May 25, 2022, Green was drafted by Tri-State with the sixteenth overall pick of the 2022 BIG3 draft.

== Personal life ==
Green's older brother, Gerald, is a former professional basketball player. He won the NBA Slam Dunk Contest in 2007.
