= All-Pro Basketball League Teams =

The All-Pro Basketball League Teams are annual selections made of the best five offensive and defensive players in a given Pro Basketball League (PBL) season. The selection was first made in the 2017–18 season and awards were handed out during the first Belgian Basketball Awards show, held on 22 May 2018 in Lint, Antwerp.

== Teams ==
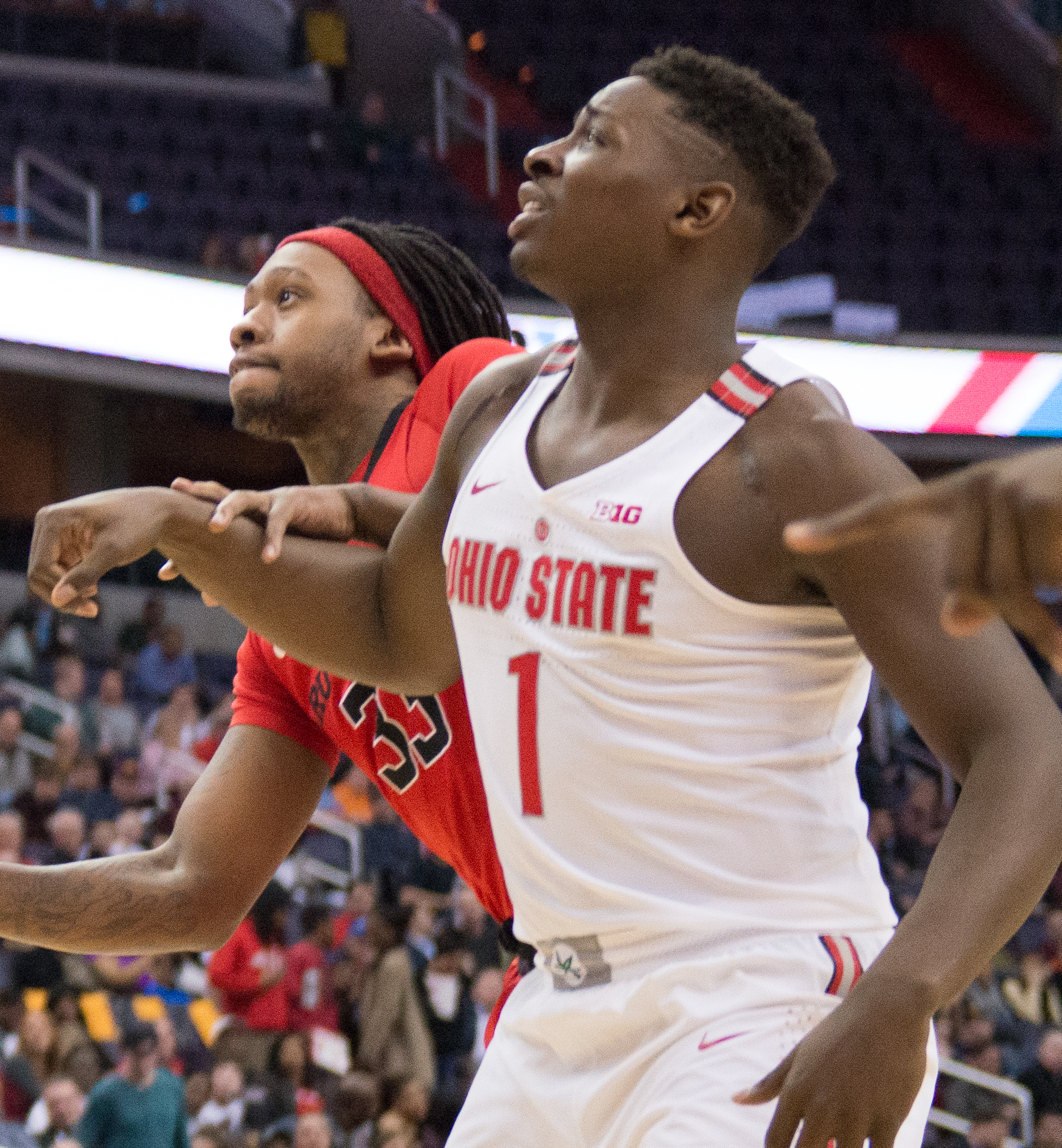
Jae'Sean Tate made the All-Offensive Team in 2019

Season	Offensive Team		Defensive Team		Ref.
Season	Player	Club	Player	Club	Ref.
2017–18	(Serbia) Dušan Đorđević	Oostende	(United States) Paris Lee	Telenet Giants Antwerp	
2017–18	(United States) Garlon Green	Belfius Mons-Hainaut	(United States) Bill Amis	Okapi Aalstar	
2017–18	(Belgium) Jean Salumu	Oostende	(Belgium) Jean Salumu	Oostende	
2017–18	(United States) Chase Fieler	Oostende	(Belgium) Jean-Marc Mwema	Oostende	
2017–18	(United States) Seth Tuttle	Proximus Spirou	(Nigeria) Tonye Jekiri	Oostende	
2018–19	(United States) Paris Lee	Antwerp Giants	(United States) Paris Lee (2)	Antwerp Giants	
2018–19	(United States) Matt Mobley	Spirou	(United States) Clifford Hammonds	Spirou	
2018–19	(United States) Jae'Sean Tate	Antwerp Giants	(Belgium) Jean-Marc Mwema	Oostende	
2018–19	(United States) Amin Stevens	Brussels	(Senegal) Ibrahima Fall Faye	Leuven Bears	
2018–19	(Belgium) Ismaël Bako	Antwerp Giants	(Belgium) Ismaël Bako	Antwerp Giants	
