= 2018–19 Basketball Champions League =

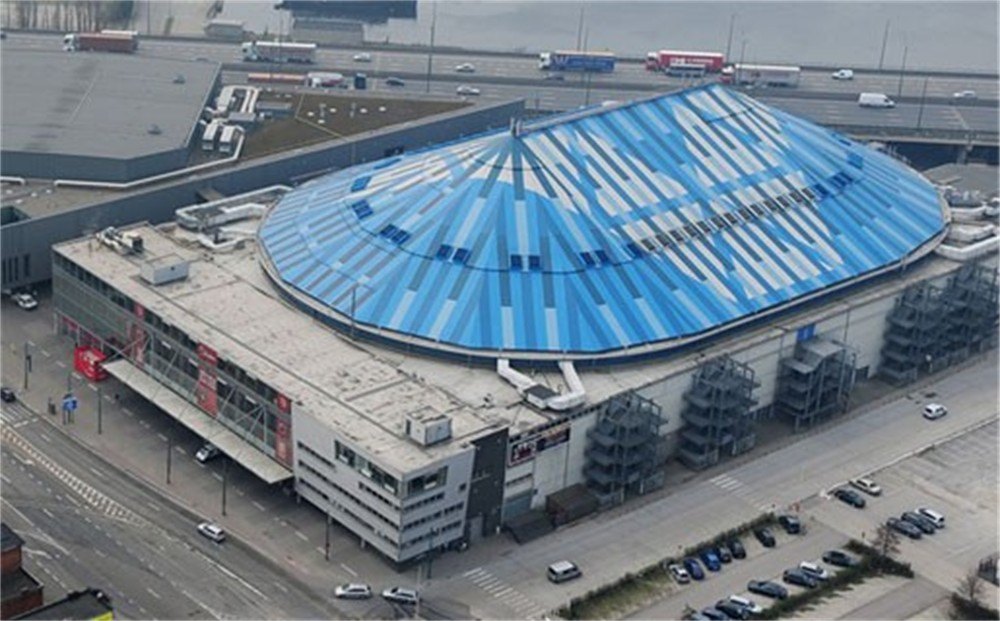
- The Sportpaleis in Antwerp hosted the Final Four
- Season: 2018–19
- Dates: 20 September 2018 – 5 May 2019
- Teams: 55

Regular season
- Season MVP: (Montenegro) Tyrese Rice

Finals
- Champions: (Italy) Segafredo Virtus Bologna (1st title)
- Runners-up: (Spain) Iberostar Tenerife
- Third place: (Belgium) Telenet Antwerp Giants
- Fourth place: (Germany) Brose Bamberg
- Final Four MVP: (United States) Kevin Punter

Statistical leaders
Points	(United States) Vince Hunter	18.0
Rebounds	(Senegal) Babacar Touré	10.1
Assists	(Poland) Kamil Łączyński	7.8
Index Rating	(United States) Vince Hunter	22.8

Records
- Biggest home win: Tenerife 97–38 Opava (30 January 2019)
- Highest attendance: 17,289; Tenerife 70–54 Antwerp Giants (3 May 2019)

Seasons
- ← 2017–18 2019–20 →

The 2018–19 Basketball Champions League was the third season of the Basketball Champions League (BCL), a European-wide professional basketball competition for clubs, that was launched by FIBA. The competition began in September 2018, with the qualifying rounds, and concluded in May 2019. It featured 19 domestic champions including two from France and Italy.

The Final Four was held in the Sportpaleis in Antwerp on 3 and 5 May 2019.

Virtus Bologna won its first BCL championship. As such, the team qualified for the 2020 FIBA Intercontinental Cup.

== Eligibility of players ==
In 2017, FIBA agreed to adopt eligibility rules, forcing the clubs to have at least 5 home-grown players in rosters of 11 or 12 players, or at least four, if the team has got fewer players.

== Team allocation ==
A total of 56 teams (19 of which are champions) from 28 countries will participate in the 2018–19 Basketball Champions League. On July 11, 2018, Kalev/Cramo was replaced by Z-Mobile Prishtina. On July 12, 2018, Eskişehir announced their withdrawal from the competition, leaving an open spot in group C that would be occupied by Lietkabelis.

=== Teams ===
League positions after eventual playoffs of the previous season shown in parentheses (TH: Champions League title holders; FEC: FIBA Europe Cup title holders).

Regular season
(France) Le Mans Sarthe (1st)	(Greece) Promitheas (4th)	(Spain) Iberostar Tenerife (8th)	(Turkey) Beşiktaş Sompo Japan (5th)
(France) SIG Strasbourg (3rd)	(Greece) AEK^{TH} (5th)	(Spain) Montakit Fuenlabrada (9th)	(Belgium) Filou Oostende (1st)
(France) JDA Dijon (5th)	(Italy) Umana Reyer Venezia^{FEC} (1st)	(Israel) Hapoel Holon (2nd)	(Latvia) Ventspils (1st)
(Germany) MHP Riesen Ludwigsburg (3rd)	(Italy) Sidigas Avellino (5th)	(Israel) Hapoel Jerusalem (3rd)	(Poland) Anwil Włocławek (1st)
(Germany) Brose Bamberg (4th)	(Italy) Segafredo Virtus Bologna (9th)	(Lithuania) Neptūnas (3rd)	(Slovenia) Petrol Olimpija (1st)
(Germany) Telekom Baskets Bonn (5th)	(Czech Republic) ČEZ Nymburk (1st)	(Lithuania) Lietkabelis (4th)	
(Greece) PAOK (3rd)	(Czech Republic) Opava (2nd)	(Turkey) Banvit (4th)	
Third qualifying round
(Czech Republic) JIP Pardubice (3rd)	(France) Nanterre 92 (7th)	(Turkey) Sakarya Büyükşehir (8th)	
(Spain) UCAM Murcia (10th)	(Germany) medi Bayreuth (6th)		
First qualifying round
(Belgium) Telenet Giants Antwerp (2nd)	(Cyprus) Petrolina AEK Larnaca (1st)	(Greece) Aris (9th)	(Netherlands) Donar (1st)
(Belgium) Spirou (3rd)	(Denmark) Bakken Bears (1st)	(Hungary) Szolnoki Olaj (1st)	(Poland) Polski Cukier Toruń (3rd)
(Russia) Avtodor (6th)	(Spain) Movistar Estudiantes (11th)	(Israel) Hapoel Tel Aviv (4th)	(Portugal) Porto (2nd)
(Russia) Nizhny Novgorod (7th)	(Finland) Karhu (1st)	(Italy) Red October Cantù (7th)	(Romania) Oradea (1st)
(Belarus) Tsmoki-Minsk (1st)	(United Kingdom) Leicester Riders (1st)	(Kosovo) Z-Mobile Prishtina (2nd)	(Sweden) Norrköping Dolphins (1st)
(Bulgaria) Levski Lukoil (1st)	(Georgia (country)) Dinamo Tbilisi (1st)	(Lithuania) Šiauliai (5th)	(Switzerland) Fribourg Olympic (1st)

== Round and draw dates ==
The schedule of the competition is as follows (all draws are held at the FIBA headquarters in Mies, Switzerland, unless stated otherwise):

Phase	Round	Draw date	First leg	Second leg
Qualifying rounds	First qualifying round	11 July 2018	20–21 September 2018	22–24 September 2018
Qualifying rounds	Second qualifying round	11 July 2018	25–26 September 2018	27–29 September 2018
Qualifying rounds	Third qualifying round	11 July 2018	1 October 2018	4 October 2018
Regular season	Matchday 1	11 July 2018	9–10 October 2018	
Regular season	Matchday 2	11 July 2018	16–17 October 2018	
Regular season	Matchday 3	11 July 2018	23–24 October 2018	
Regular season	Matchday 4	11 July 2018	30–31 October 2018	
Regular season	Matchday 5	11 July 2018	6–7 November 2018	
Regular season	Matchday 6	11 July 2018	13–14 November 2018	
Regular season	Matchday 7	11 July 2018	20-21 November 2018	
Regular season	Matchday 8	11 July 2018	11–12 December 2018	
Regular season	Matchday 9	11 July 2018	18–19 December 2018	
Regular season	Matchday 10	11 July 2018	8–9 January 2019	
Regular season	Matchday 11	11 July 2018	15–16 January 2019	
Regular season	Matchday 12	11 July 2018	22–23 January 2019	
Regular season	Matchday 13	11 July 2018	29–30 January 2019	
Regular season	Matchday 14	11 July 2018	5–6 February 2019	
Play-offs	Round of 16	8 February 2019	5–6 March 2019	12–13 March 2019
Play-offs	Quarter-finals	8 February 2019	26–27 March 2019	2–3 April 2019
Final Four	Semi-finals	11 April 2019	3 May 2019	
Final Four	Final	11 April 2019	5 May 2019	

== Qualifying rounds ==
The first qualifying rounds were held on 20–21 September and 22–24 September 2018. The second round was held on 25–26 September and 27–29 September 2018. The third round was played on 30 September and 2 October 2018. The losers of all the rounds entered the 2018–19 FIBA Europe Cup regular season.

=== Draw ===
The 24 teams that entered in the first round were divided into four pots. Teams of pot A would play against teams from pot D in games 1 to 6, and pot B teams will face the ones of the pot C. Teams from pots A and B would play the second leg at home.

In the second round, teams from games 7 to 12 would play the first leg at home.

Teams from the same country could not be drawn against each other.

Pot A (Belgium) Telenet Giants Antwerp (Denmark) Bakken Bears (Greece) Aris (Romania) Oradea (Russia) Avtodor (Spain) Movistar Estudiantes	Pot B (Belarus) Tsmoki-Minsk (Belgium) Spirou (Bulgaria) Lukoil Levski (Hungary) Szolnoki Olaj (Netherlands) Donar (Russia) Nizhny Novgorod	Pot C (Israel) Hapoel Tel Aviv (Italy) Red October Cantù (Kosovo) Z-Mobile Prishtina (Lithuania) Šiauliai (Poland) Polski Cukier Toruń (Portugal) Porto	Pot D (Cyprus) Petrolina AEK Larnaca (Finland) Karhu (Georgia (country)) Dinamo Tbilisi (United Kingdom) Leicester Riders (Sweden) Norrköping Dolphins (Switzerland) Fribourg Olympic

=== First qualifying round ===
A total of 24 teams will play in the first qualifying round. The first legs were played on 20 and 21 September, while the second legs were played on 22 and 24 September 2018.

Team 1	Agg.	Team 2	1st leg	2nd leg
Leicester Riders (United Kingdom)	161–193	(Denmark) Bakken Bears	77–90	84–103
Fribourg Olympic (Switzerland)	167–165	(Russia) Avtodor	89–89	78–76
Petrolina AEK Larnaca (Cyprus)	128–159	(Belgium) Telenet Giants Antwerp	74–83	54–76
Dinamo Tbilisi (Georgia (country))	118–182	(Greece) Aris	64–90	54–92
Norrköping Dolphins (Sweden)	133–143	(Spain) Movistar Estudiantes	62–74	71–69
Karhu (Finland)	167–158	(Romania) Oradea	87–84	80–74
Red October Cantù (Italy)	159–139	(Hungary) Szolnoki Olaj	69–68	90–71
Hapoel Tel Aviv (Israel)	135–146	(Belgium) Spirou	76–73	59–73
Šiauliai (Lithuania)	144–170	(Bulgaria) Lukoil Levski	79–91	65–79
Polski Cukier Toruń (Poland)	160–151	(Belarus) Tsmoki-Minsk	87–61	73–90
Porto (Portugal)	134–178	(Russia) Nizhny Novgorod	85–86	49–92
Z-Mobile Prishtina (Kosovo)	139–144	(Netherlands) Donar	84–64	55–80

=== Second qualifying round ===
The twelve winners of the first qualifying round will play the second round. The first legs were played on 25 and 26 September, while the second legs were played on 27 and 29 September 2018.

After the retirement of Eskişehir, the winner of the series between Red October Cantù and Telenet Giants Antwerp joined directly the regular season.

Team 1	Agg.	Team 2	1st leg	2nd leg
Red October Cantù (Italy)	170–184	(Belgium) Telenet Giants Antwerp	76–84	94–100
Polski Cukier Toruń (Poland)	144–137	(Spain) Movistar Estudiantes	60–68	84–69
Lukoil Levski (Bulgaria)	167–181	(Finland) Karhu	88–93	79–88
Spirou (Belgium)	133–130	(Denmark) Bakken Bears	59–61	74–69
Nizhny Novgorod (Russia)	125–116	(Greece) Aris	63–65	62–51
Donar (Netherlands)	144–151	(Switzerland) Fribourg Olympic	67–72	77–79

=== Third qualifying round ===
After the retirement of Eskişehir, a total of 10 teams will play in the third qualifying round: five teams which enter in this round, and five of the six winners of the second qualifying round. Winners of game 13 will directly qualify to the regular season without playing this round. The first legs were played on 1 October, while the second legs were played on 4 October 2018.

Team 1	Agg.	Team 2	1st leg	2nd leg
Fribourg Olympic (Switzerland)	163–137	(Turkey) Sakarya Büyükşehir	87–85	76–52
Karhu (Finland)	112–182	(France) Nanterre 92	54–91	58–91
Spirou (Belgium)	144–149	(Spain) UCAM Murcia	62–71	82–78
Nizhny Novgorod (Russia)	177–141	(Czech Republic) JIP Pardubice	92–84	85–57
Polski Cukier Toruń (Poland)	146–159	(Germany) medi Bayreuth	73–73	73–86

== Regular season ==
Location of teams of the 2018–19 Basketball Champions League regular season.
Red: Group A; Green: Group B; Blue: Group C; Yellow: Group D.

The 32 teams are drawn into four groups of eight, with the restriction that teams from the same country could not be drawn against each other. In each group, teams play against each other home-and-away, in a round-robin format. The group winners, runners-up, third-placed teams and fourth-placed teams, advance to the round of 16, while the fifth-placed teams and sixth-placed teams enter the 2018–19 FIBA Europe Cup playoffs.

A total of 32 teams play in the regular season: 26 teams which enter in this stage, and the 6 winners of the third qualifying round. The regular season will start on 9 October 2018 and end 6 February 2019.

=== Draw ===
Teams were divided into two pots according to the club ranking published by the organization. Twelve teams were named seeded teams while the rest would be unseeded teams.

Seeded teams
(Greece) AEK^{TH}	(Germany) MHP Riesen Ludwigsburg
(Turkey) Banvit	(Lithuania) Neptūnas
(Turkey) Beşiktaş Sompo Japan	(Greece) PAOK
(Germany) Brose Bamberg (Note: Despite not participating in previous editions, Brose Bamberg was considered as seeded team as the team played in the 2017–18 EuroLeague.)	(Italy) Sidigas Avellino
(Czech Republic) ČEZ Nymburk	(France) SIG Strasbourg
(Spain) Iberostar Tenerife	(Italy) Umana Reyer Venezia

=== Group A ===
Pos	Team	Pld	W	L	PF	PA	PD	Pts	Qualification	MUR	BAN	NIZ	MSB	AVE	VEN	ANW	LUD
1	(Spain) UCAM Murcia	14	13	1	1080	945	+135	27	Advance to round of 16	—	86–71	94–90	74–62	72–69	91–85	78–70	73–47
2	(Turkey) Banvit	14	9	5	1149	1073	+76	23	Advance to round of 16	62–63	—	78–60	96–67	96–88	78–63	75–68	89–76
3	(Russia) Nizhny Novgorod	14	7	7	1117	1077	+40	21	Advance to round of 16	51–72	72–75	—	85–71	93–100	82–73	86–62	74–76
4	(France) Le Mans Sarthe	14	7	7	1057	1066	−9	21	Advance to round of 16	71–80	85–71	89–74	—	74–77	91–76	88–79	64–54
5	(Italy) Sidigas Avellino	14	7	7	1160	1177	−17	21	Transfer to FIBA Europe Cup	57–63	99–95	71–92	68–81	—	74–88	106–102	82–76
6	(Latvia) Ventspils	14	6	8	1142	1178	−36	20	Transfer to FIBA Europe Cup	61–67	86–80	75–80	88–77	106–102	—	78–99	93–92
7	(Poland) Anwil Włocławek	14	4	10	1103	1164	−61	18		68–87	84–95	82–93	76–64	62–72	84–71	—	74–87
8	(Germany) MHP Riesen Ludwigsburg	14	3	11	1035	1163	−128	17		81–80	76–88	59–85	68–73	77–96	81–99	85–93	—

Source: Basketball Champions League
Legend: Blue = home team win; Red = away team win.

=== Group B ===
Pos	Team	Pld	W	L	PF	PA	PD	Pts	Qualification	TFE	VEN	NAN	PAOK	HOL	BONN	FRI	OPA
1	(Spain) Iberostar Tenerife	14	12	2	1164	945	+219	26	Advance to round of 16	—	78–80	79–68	65–66	84–52	87–68	91–68	97–38
2	(Italy) Umana Reyer Venezia	14	10	4	1170	1096	+74	24	Advance to round of 16	65–72	—	87–99	69–59	111–104	69–73	72–62	102–81
3	(France) Nanterre 92	14	8	6	1159	1046	+113	22	Advance to round of 16	58–75	80–89	—	79–70	70–82	103–56	96–87	110–64
4	(Greece) PAOK	14	8	6	1127	1036	+91	22	Advance to round of 16	77–85	77–76	83–82	—	92–77	95–100	92–61	93–43
5	(Israel) Hapoel Holon	14	7	7	1145	1117	+28	21	Transfer to FIBA Europe Cup	77–88	69–70	62–74	72–68	—	94–74	93–69	88–72
6	(Germany) Telekom Baskets Bonn	14	6	8	1120	1181	−61	20	Transfer to FIBA Europe Cup	92–99	84–94	57–81	94–77	91–83	—	63–70	114–77
7	(Switzerland) Fribourg Olympic	14	3	11	1057	1184	−127	17		66–72	86–96	81–92	64–84	90–95	79–83	—	97–79
8	(Czech Republic) Opava	14	2	12	952	1289	−337	16		70–92	72–90	74–67	69–94	64–97	73–71	76–77	—

Source: Basketball Champions League
Legend: Blue = home team win; Red = away team win.

=== Group C ===
Pos	Team	Pld	W	L	PF	PA	PD	Pts	Qualification	AEK	JER	BRO	ANT	LIE	JDA	NYM	FUE
1	(Greece) AEK	14	12	2	1133	1034	+99	26	Advance to round of 16	—	75–79	93–86	77–76	65–59	80–56	80–76	78–71
2	(Israel) Hapoel Jerusalem	14	12	2	1265	1093	+172	26	Advance to round of 16	70–83	—	103–89	92–72	81–67	86–72	88–64	91–77
3	(Germany) Brose Bamberg	14	9	5	1152	1136	+16	23	Advance to round of 16	77–73	85–88	—	82–78	82–77	73–64	78–71	88–89
4	(Belgium) Telenet Giants Antwerp	14	7	7	1120	1099	+21	21	Advance to round of 16	64–71	101–89	76–85	—	70–64	67–63	85–72	102–78
5	(Lithuania) Lietkabelis	14	5	9	1073	1107	−34	19	Transfer to FIBA Europe Cup	65–84	70–97	84–67	87–91	—	78–62	97–86	78–67
6	(France) JDA Dijon	14	4	10	1058	1118	−60	18	Transfer to FIBA Europe Cup	80–90	83–85	97–101	61–80	99–91	—	74–63	85–87
7	(Czech Republic) ČEZ Nymburk	14	4	10	1097	1183	−86	18		93–94	80–111	78–84	82–74	78–71	78–89	—	104–87
8	(Spain) Montakit Fuenlabrada	14	3	11	1082	1210	−128	17		82–90	75–105	65–75	96–84	78–85	59–73	71–72	—

Source: Basketball Champions League
Legend: Blue = home team win; Red = away team win.

=== Group D ===
Pos	Team	Pld	W	L	PF	PA	PD	Pts	Qualification	BOL	BJK	NEP	PRO	SIG	OST	BAY	OLI
1	(Italy) Segafredo Virtus Bologna	14	10	4	1203	1099	+104	24	Advance to round of 16	—	70–71	83–78	98–91	87–81	89–60	74–67	87–84
2	(Turkey) Beşiktaş Sompo Japan	14	9	5	1089	1064	+25	23	Advance to round of 16	90–94	—	77–70	96–74	71–78	80–71	74–90	94–84
3	(Lithuania) Neptūnas	14	8	6	1166	1130	+36	22	Advance to round of 16	88–85	78–63	—	82–83	92–83	77–79	83–73	82–74
4	(Greece) Promitheas	14	8	6	1143	1150	−7	22	Advance to round of 16	85–95	80–72	69–82	—	77–64	84–88	95–83	79–77
5	(France) SIG Strasbourg	14	8	6	1090	1085	+5	22	Transfer to FIBA Europe Cup	83–80	64–69	80–90	83–78	—	61–64	67–63	81–73
6	(Belgium) Filou Oostende	14	7	7	1071	1119	−48	21	Transfer to FIBA Europe Cup	77–76	66–73	91–89	84–93	94–100	—	82–62	73–79
7	(Germany) Medi Bayreuth	14	5	9	1084	1092	−8	19		83–93	70–78	102–78	70–75	76–84	87–71	—	82–71
8	(Slovenia) Petrol Olimpija	14	1	13	1049	1156	−107	15		61–92	75–81	88–97	76–80	71–81	69–71	67–76	—

Source: Basketball Champions League
Legend: Blue = home team win; Red = away team win.

== Playoffs ==
The playoffs start on 5 March 2019 and end 3 April 2019.

In the playoffs, teams play against each other over two legs on a home-and-away basis, except for the Final Four. In the playoffs draw, the group winners and the runners-up are seeded, and the third-placed teams and the fourth-placed teams are unseeded. The seeded teams are drawn against the unseeded teams, with the seeded teams hosting the second leg. Teams from the same group could not be drawn against each other.

=== Bracket ===
Round of 16
(France) Nanterre 92	68	62	130
(Turkey) Beşiktaş Sompo Japan	59	60	119
(France) Le Mans Sarthe	74	58	132
(Italy) Virtus Bologna	74	81	155
(Germany) Brose Bamberg	81	88	169
(Turkey) Banvit	79	85	164
(Greece) PAOK	75	63	138
(Greece) AEK	84	62	146
(Lithuania) Neptūnas	74	64	138
(Israel) Hapoel Jerusalem	86	84	170
(Greece) Promitheas	69	57	126
(Spain) Iberostar Tenerife	57	79	136
(Russia) Nizhny Novgorod	95	66	161
(Italy) Umana Reyer Venezia	72	84	156
(Belgium) Telenet Giants	75	77	152
(Spain) UCAM Murcia	67	78	145

Quarterfinals
(France) Nanterre 92	83	58	141
(Italy) Virtus Bologna	75	73	148
(Germany) Brose Bamberg	71	67	138
(Greece) AEK	67	69	136
(Israel) Hapoel Jerusalem	75	64	139
(Spain) Iberostar Tenerife	73	81	154
(Russia) Nizhny Novgorod	68	61	129
(Belgium) Telenet Giants	83	66	149

Semifinals
(Italy) Virtus Bologna	67
(Germany) Brose Bamberg	50
(Spain) Iberostar Tenerife	70
(Belgium) Telenet Antwerp Giants	54

Final
(Italy) Virtus Bologna	73
(Spain) Iberostar Tenerife	61
Third place
(Germany) Brose Bamberg	58
(Belgium) Telenet Antwerp Giants	72

=== Round of 16 ===
The first legs were played on 6–7 March, and the second legs on 13–14 March 2019.

Team 1	Agg.	Team 2	1st leg	2nd leg
Brose Bamberg (Germany)	169–164	(Turkey) Banvit	81–79	88–85
Nanterre 92 (France)	130–119	(Turkey) Beşiktaş Sompo Japan	68–59	62–60
Neptūnas (Lithuania)	138–170	(Israel) Hapoel Jerusalem	74–86	64–84
Nizhny Novgorod (Russia)	161–156	(Italy) Umana Reyer Venezia	95–72	66–84
PAOK (Greece)	138–146	(Greece) AEK	75–84	63–62
Promitheas (Greece)	126–136	(Spain) Iberostar Tenerife	69–57	57–79
Le Mans Sarthe (France)	132–155	(Italy) Segafredo Virtus Bologna	74–74	58–81
Telenet Giants Antwerp (Belgium)	152–145	(Spain) UCAM Murcia	75–67	77–78

=== Quarterfinals ===
The first legs were played on 27–28 March, and the second legs were played on 3–4 April 2019.

Team 1	Agg.	Team 2	1st leg	2nd leg
Hapoel Jerusalem (Israel)	139–154	(Spain) Iberostar Tenerife	75–73	64–81
Nizhny Novgorod (Russia)	129–149	(Belgium) Telenet Giants Antwerp	68–83	61–66
Nanterre 92 (France)	141–148	(Italy) Segafredo Virtus Bologna	83–75	58–73
Brose Bamberg (Germany)	138–136	(Greece) AEK	71–67	67–69

== Final Four ==
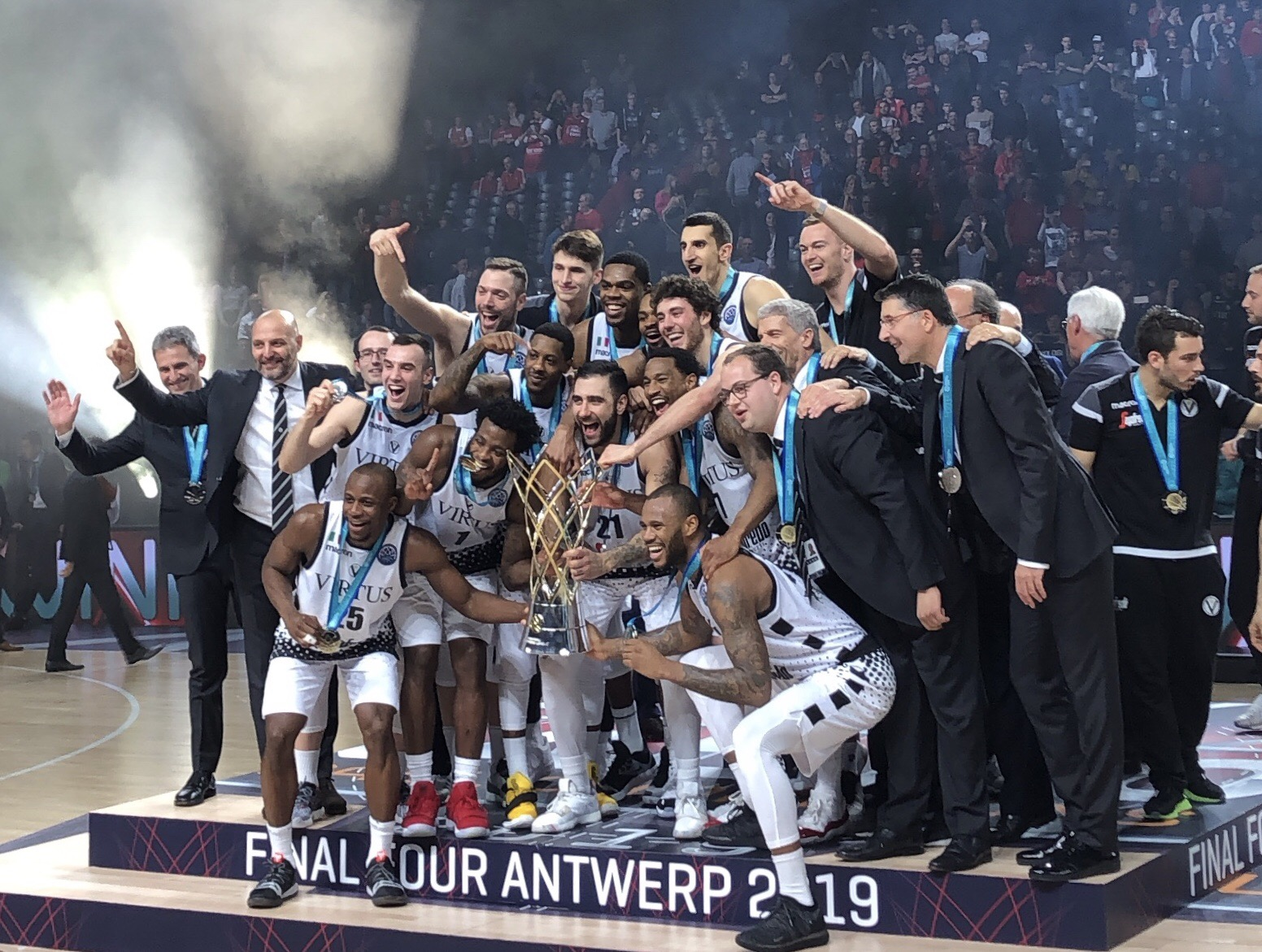
Virtus Bologna celebrating after winning the title in Antwerp

The concluding Final Four tournament will be played on 3–5 May 2019. The drawing of the pairings took place on 10 April 2019. On 5 April, the Sportpaleis in Antwerp, Belgium was announced as the venue of the 2019 Final Four.

Semifinals
3 May
(Italy) Segafredo Virtus Bologna	67
(Germany) Brose Bamberg	50
3 May
(Spain) Iberostar Tenerife	70
(Belgium) Telenet Antwerp Giants	54

Final
5 May
(Italy) Segafredo Virtus Bologna	73
(Spain) Iberostar Tenerife	61
Third place game
5 May
(Germany) Brose Bamberg	58
(Belgium) Telenet Antwerp Giants	72

== Awards ==
=== Most Valuable Player ===
Player	Team	Ref.
(United States) Tyrese Rice	(Germany) Brose Bamberg	

=== Final Four MVP ===
Player	Team	Ref.
(United States) Kevin Punter	(Italy) Virtus Bologna	

=== Star Lineup ===
First team		Second team		Ref.
Players	Teams	Players	Teams	Ref.
(United States) Tyrese Rice	(Germany) Brose Bamberg	(United States) Paris Lee	(Belgium) Telenet Giants Antwerp	
(United States) Kevin Punter	(Italy) Segafredo Virtus Bologna	(Dominican Republic) James Feldeine	(Israel) Hapoel Jerusalem	
(United States) Tim Abromaitis	(Spain) Iberostar Tenerife	(United Kingdom) Ovie Soko	(Spain) UCAM Murcia	
(United States) Vince Hunter	(Greece) AEK Athens	(France) Amath M'Baye	(Italy) Segafredo Virtus Bologna	
(Belgium) Ismaël Bako	(Belgium) Telenet Giants Antwerp	(United States) Colton Iverson	(Spain) Iberostar Tenerife	

=== All Defensive Team ===
Player	Team	Ref.
(Turkey) İsmail Ulusoy	(Turkey) Bantiv	
(United States) Kendrick Perry	(Russia) Nizhny Novgorod	
(United States) Kelvin Martin	(Italy) Virtus Bologna	
(Cuba) Howard Sant-Roos	(Greece) AEK Athens	
(France) Youssoupha Fall	(France) SIG Strasbourg	

=== Best Young Player ===
Player	Team	Ref.
(Israel) Tamir Blatt	(Israel) Hapoel Jerusalem	

=== Best Coach ===
Player	Team	Ref.
(Belgium) Roel Moors	(Belgium) Telenet Giants Antwerp	

=== Game Day MVP ===
After each gameday a selection of five players with the highest efficiency ratings is made by the Basketball Champions League. Afterwards, the official website decides which player is crowned Game Day MVP.

==== Regular season ====
Gameday	Player	Team	EFF	Ref.
1	(United States) Norris Cole	(Italy) Sidigas Avellino	28	
2	(United States) Austin Daye	(Italy) Umana Reyer Venezia	33	
3	(United States) Norris Cole (2)	(Italy) Sidigas Avellino	33	
4	(United States) Vince Hunter	(Greece) AEK	39	
5	(Dominican Republic) James Feldeine	(Israel) Hapoel Jerusalem	39	
6	(United States) Julian Gamble	(France) Nanterre 92	34	
7	(Greece) Linos Chrysikopoulos	(Greece) PAOK	25	
8	(United States) Malcolm Griffin	(Greece) AEK	34	
9	(United States) Paris Lee	(Belgium) Telenet Giants Antwerp	35	
10	(United States) Jason Rich	(Turkey) Beşiktaş Sompo Japan	27	
11	(United States) Marcos Knight	(Germany) MHP Riesen Ludwigsburg	39	
12	(United States) Vince Hunter (2)	(Greece) AEK	37	
13	(United States) Vince Hunter (3)	(Greece) AEK	39	
14	(France) Amath M'Baye	(Italy) Segafredo Virtus Bologna	27	

==== Round of 16 ====
Player	Team	EFF	Ref.
(United States) Tyrese Rice	(Germany) Brose Bamberg	14 / 28	

==== Quarterfinals ====
Player	Team	EFF	Ref.
(United States) Tim Abromaitis	(Spain) Iberostar Tenerife	21 / 26	

== Prize money ==
Based on final position, teams received prize money from the BCL.

Competition stage	Final position	Prize money (€)
Final	Winners	€1,000,000
Final	Runners-up	€400,000
Match for third place	Third place	€200,000
Match for third place	Fourth place	€140,000
Playoffs	Quarterfinalist	€100,000
Playoffs	Round of 16	€70,000
Regular season		€50,000

== Sponsorship ==
Official partner	Equipment partner
Peak	Molten

== See also ==
- 2018–19 EuroLeague
- 2018–19 EuroCup Basketball
- 2018–19 FIBA Europe Cup
