= Paris Lee =

American basketball player

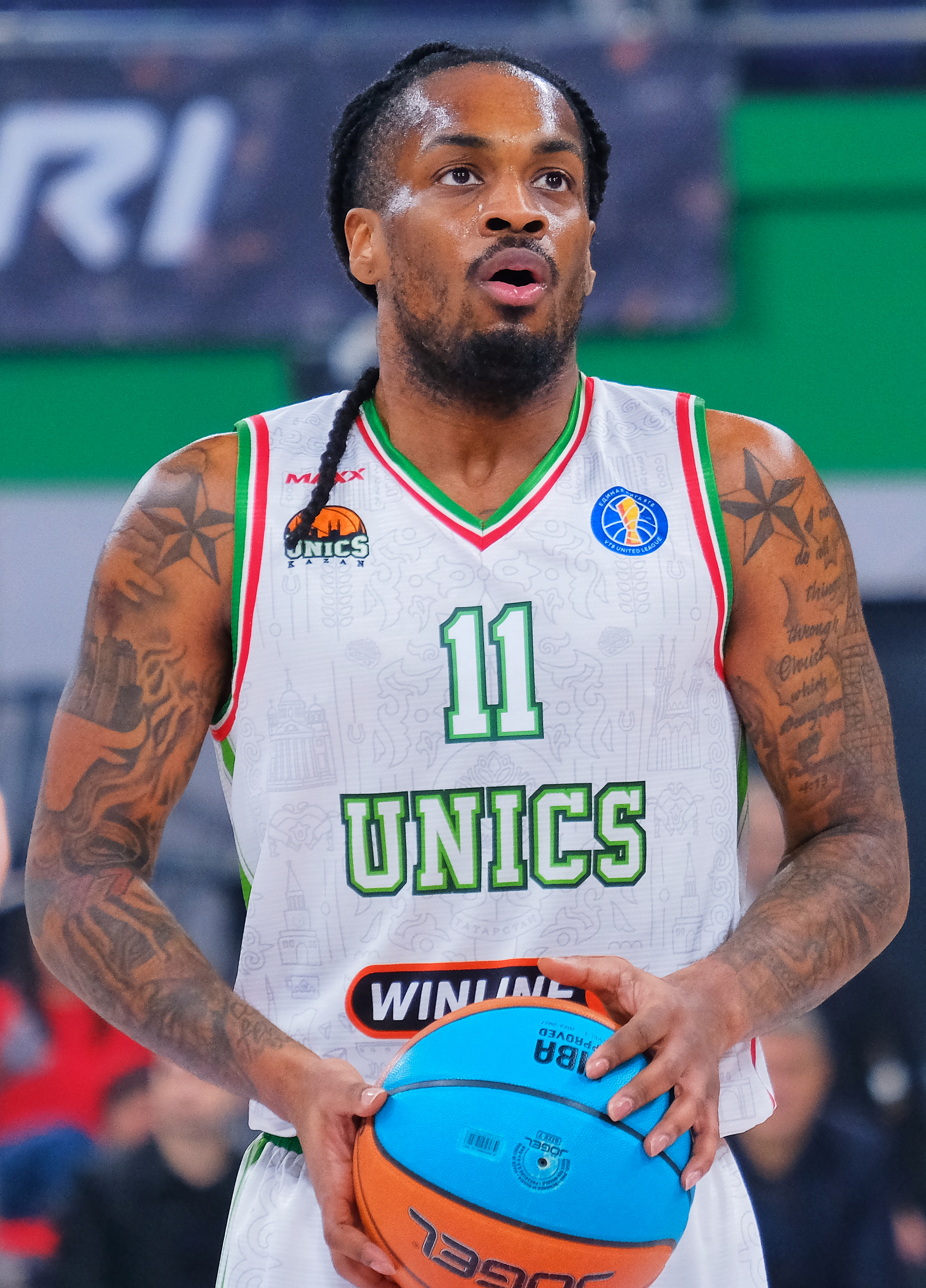
- Lee with UNICS Kazan in 2026

No. 55 – Ironi Ness Ziona
- Position: Point guard
- League: Israeli Basketball Premier League

Personal information
- Born: April 20, 1995 (age 31) Maywood, Illinois, U.S.
- Listed height: 6 ft 0 in (1.83 m)
- Listed weight: 185 lb (84 kg)

Career information
- High school: Proviso East (Maywood, Illinois)
- College: Illinois State (2013–2017)
- NBA draft: 2017: undrafted
- Playing career: 2017–present

Career history
- 2017–2019: Antwerp Giants
- 2019–2020: Brose Bamberg
- 2020–2021: Orléans Loiret
- 2021–2022: AS Monaco
- 2022–2023: Panathinaikos
- 2023–2025: ASVEL
- 2025–2026: UNICS Kazan
- 2026–present: Ironi Ness Ziona

Career highlights
- EuroLeague steals leader (2024); FIBA All-Champions League Second Team (2019); Greek League steals leader (2023); LNB Élite assists leader (2021) & steals leader (2021); Belgian Cup winner (2019); Belgian League MVP (2019); Belgian League All-Offensive Team (2019); 2× Belgian League All-Defensive Team (2018, 2019); Belgian League assists leader (2019) & steals leader (2019); AP Honorable Mention All-American (2017); MVC Player of the Year (2017); MVC Defensive Player of the Year (2017); First-team All-MVC (2017); 3× MVC All-Defensive Team (2015–2017)

Paris Lee (born April 20, 1995) is an American-born naturalized Cameroonian professional basketball player for Ironi Ness Ziona of the Israeli Basketball Premier League.

He played college basketball for the Illinois State Redbirds. A 6 ft 0 in (1.83 m) point guard, Lee was named the Missouri Valley Conference Player of the Year and MVC Defensive Player of the Year as a senior in the 2016–17 season, and concluded his college career as the team's all-time leader in steals.

Lee started his professional career with the Antwerp Giants in Belgium, and earned Belgian League MVP honors and led the league in assists and steals during the 2018–19 season. Individually, he was named to the All-Champions League Second Team, and was named the Pro Basketball League MVP.

He subsequently led the LNB Élite in assists and steals with Orléans Loiret Basket and spent three consecutive seasons in the EuroLeague with AS Monaco, Panathinaikos, and ASVEL, leading the EuroLeague in steals in 2024. He received Cameroonian citizenship in 2022, and debuted for the national team the following year.

== High school career ==
Lee attended Proviso East High School in Maywood, Illinois, where he played for former National Basketball Association (NBA) player Donnie Boyce alongside future NBA players Sterling Brown and Jevon Carter. As a junior in 2011–12, he averaged 11.9 points, 4.1 assists, and 2.8 rebounds per game, while shooting 45.8% from three-point range, and helped lead the Pirates to a second-place finish in the Illinois High School Association (IHSA) Class 4A state tournament.

As a senior in 2012–13, Lee averaged 10.4 points, 5.0 assists, and 3.0 rebounds per game, while shooting 46.2% from the field and 41.8% from three-point range, as Proviso East compiled a 29–4 record and reached the IHSA Class 4A state semifinals, falling to eventual state champion Chicago Simeon. He also played in the Illinois Basketball Coaches Association (IBCA) Annual 3A/4A All-Star Game in the summer of 2013, and played Amateur Athletic Union (AAU) basketball for the Mac Irvin Fire. Following his senior season, the Chicago Sun-Times ranked Lee as the No. 14 overall prospect in Illinois' Class of 2013.

== College career ==
Lee attended Illinois State University for college, and played for the Illinois State Redbirds basketball team in the Missouri Valley Conference (MVC). In his freshman season in 2013-14, as the team's starting point guard he played in all 34 games averaging 27.5 minutes, 6.7 points, 2.0 rebounds, 2.3 assists, and 1.4 steals (10th in the conference) per game.

In his sophomore season in 2014-15, he started all 34 games he played and averaged 29.8 minutes, 6.8 points, 2.4 rebounds, 3.6 assists, and 2.4 steals per game. He ranked second in the conference in assist-to-turnover ratio (1.9), and led the MVC while ranking ninth nationally in steals, setting a single-season school record with 82 steals. He also was named to the MVC All-Defensive Team.

In his junior year in 2015-16, he played in 32 games (30 starts) and averaged 30.4 minutes, 11.1 points, 2.7 rebounds, 3.7 assists, and 1.7 steals per game, finishing third in the conference in steals and fourth in both assists and assist-to-turnover ratio (1.9). He repeated as an MVC All-Defensive Team selection, and received All-MVC Honorable Mention recognition.

In his senior season in 2016-17, he started all 35 games, averaged 30.9 minutes, 13.0 points, 3.7 rebounds,5.0 assists, and 1.9 steals per game, and led the MVC in both assists and steals, while shooting 41.8% from three-point range. He led the Redbirds to a shared MVC title in a year dedicated to former associate head coach Torrey Ward, who had died in a plane crash on April 7, 2015.

Lee was named both the MVC Player of the Year and the MVC Defensive Player of the Year, becoming the third player in league history to win both honors. He also earned AP Honorable Mention All-American, and was named to the NABC All-District 16 First Team, First-Team All-MVC, MVC All-Tournament Team, and his third consecutive MVC All-Defensive Team selection, solidifying his reputation as one of the top defensive players in the MVC. Lee finished his college career as Illinois State's all-time leader in steals (248) and games started (132), while ranking fourth in program history in assists (495) and 21st in points (1,268).

== Professional career ==
=== Antwerp Giants (2017–2019) ===
Following the close of his college career, Lee signed with the Antwerp Giants of the Belgian League. After averaging 13.8 points per game in four games of the Basketball Champions League's Qualification Round, Lee signed a contract extension until 2020. In 52 games during the 2017-18 season, he averaged 23.8 minutes, 9.8 points, 2.0 rebounds, 4.5 assists, and 1.8 steals per game, and was named to the Belgian League All-Defensive Team.

In the 2018–19 season, Lee played in the Basketball Champions League (BCL) with Antwerp, helping it win the Belgian National Cup and playing in the Belgian All-Star Game. With Lee as starting point guard, Antwerp had a successful run to the Final Four which was hosted by Antwerp. The team ended in third place after defeating Brose Bamberg in the third place game. Lee was named to the All-Champions League Second Team. In 68 games during the 2018-19 season, he averaged 25.7 minutes, 12.0 points, 2.2 rebounds, 5.2 assists, and 1.7 steals per game. In the domestic Pro Basketball League, Lee led the league in both assists (5.3 per game) and steals (1.9 per game) and was named the Most Valuable Player, while also earning All-Offensive Team and a second consecutive All-Defensive Team selection.

=== Bamberg (2019–2020) ===
On June 29, 2019, Lee signed a two-year contract with Brose Bamberg of the German Basketball Bundesliga. He followed his Antwerp head coach Roel Moors, who signed with Bamberg earlier. In 44 games Lee averaged 25.9 minutes, 8.6 points, 2.1 rebounds, and 5.2 assists per game, while shooting 84.7% from the free throw line. Following Moors' departure after the season, Bamberg terminated the remaining year of Lee's contract on July 15, 2020.

=== Orléans Loiret Basket (2020–2021) ===
On July 15, 2020, he signed with Orléans Loiret Basket of the French Jeep Elite. He set an Orléans club record and a league-high for the season with a 16-assist performance against Boulogne-Levallois on May 8, 2021. In 34 games he averaged 31.5 minutes, 14.6 points, 2.6 rebounds, 7.7 assists (leading the league), and 2.0 steals (leading the league) per game, while shooting 40.8% from three-point range and 86.1% from the free throw line.

=== AS Monaco (2021–2022) ===
On July 14, 2021, Lee signed a one-year deal with AS Monaco of the French LNB Pro A and the EuroLeague. In 69 games he averaged 21.3 minutes, 8.8 points, 1.6 rebounds, 3.2 assists, and 1.2 steals per game, while shooting 86.8% from the free throw line.

=== Panathinaikos (2022–2023) ===
On July 1, 2022, Lee signed a two-year (1+1) contract with Panathinaikos of the Greek Basket League and the EuroLeague. On January 13, 2023, he scored 21 points in a 88–86 win over Maccabi Tel Aviv. In 33 EuroLeague games (17 starts), he averaged 27.2 minutes, 11.2 points, 1.8 rebounds, 3.9 assists, 1.3 steals and 2 turnover per game while shooting 81.1% from the free throw line. Additionally, in 32 domestic league matches, he averaged 11.1 points, 1.9 rebounds, 4.3 assists, 2.0 steals, and 2.1 turnovers per game, and led the Greek Basket League in steals for the 2022–23 season. On June 30, 2023, Panathinaikos opted out of the second year of their mutual contract and Lee became a free agent.

=== ASVEL (2023–2025) ===
On July 19, 2023, Paris signed a two-year contract with ASVEL. In 74 games with the team in 2023-24, he averaged 27.1 minutes,11.0 points, 1.8 rebounds, 5.1 assists, and 1.4 steals per game, while shooting a career-high 89.3% from the free throw line. During the season's EuroLeague campaign, Lee led the competition in steals with 1.7 per game.

In 62 games with the team in 2024-25, he averaged 22.2 minutes, 9.5 points, 1.5 rebounds, and 3.3 assists per game, while shooting 87.9% from the free throw line.

=== UNICS (2025–26) ===
In July 2025, Paris signed a contract with the Russian club Unics.

=== Ironi Ness Ziona (2026-present) ===
In 2026-27, he is playing for Ironi Ness Ziona in the Israeli Basketball Premier League.

== National team career ==
Lee became a naturalised Cameroonian citizen in 2022. On August 26, he made his debut for Cameroon in a 71–69 win over the DR Congo during the 2023 FIBA Basketball World Cup African Qualifiers, scoring 15 points as the starting point guard.

== Career statistics ==
Legend
GP	Games played	GS	Games started	MPG	Minutes per game
FG%	Field-goal percentage	3P%	3-point field-goal percentage	FT%	Free-throw percentage
RPG	Rebounds per game	APG	Assists per game	SPG	Steals per game
BPG	Blocks per game	PPG	Points per game	PIR	Performance index rating
**Bold**	Career high

=== EuroLeague ===
*	Led the league

Year	Team	GP	GS	MPG	FG%	3P%	FT%	RPG	APG	SPG	BPG	PPG	PIR
2021–22	Monaco	**36**	9	19.4	**.540**	**.353**	.863	1.4	2.4	1.1	—	7.2	7.0
2022–23	Panathinaikos	33	17	27.2	.377	.333	.811	1.8	3.8	1.4	—	11.2	10.3
2023–24	ASVEL	33	**32**	**28.0**	.397	.352	**.925**	**1.9**	**5.5**	**1.7***	—	**11.5**	**13.7**
Career		102	58	24.7	.390	.346	.866	1.7	3.9	1.4	—	9.9	10.2

=== Basketball Champions League ===
Year	Team	GP	GS	MPG	FG%	3P%	FT%	RPG	APG	SPG	BPG	PPG
2018–19	Antwerp Giants	**20**	**20**	**29.0**	**.377**	.328	.700	**2.4**	**5.0**	**1.8**	—	**12.7**
2019–20	Bamberg	14	14	25.6	.367	**.431**	**.867**	2.1	4.1	.9	—	9.2
Career		34	34	27.6	.374	.363	.738	2.3	4.6	1.4	—	11.3

=== FIBA Europe Cup ===
Year	Team	GP	GS	MPG	FG%	3P%	FT%	RPG	APG	SPG	BPG	PPG
2017–18	Antwerp Giants	6	2	19.4	.293	.143	.900	2.5	5.0	1.7	—	5.8
Career		6	2	19.4	.293	.143	.900	2.5	5.0	1.7	—	5.8

=== Domestic leagues ===
Year	Team	League	GP	MPG	FG%	3P%	FT%	RPG	APG	SPG	BPG	PPG
2017–18	(Belgium) Antwerp Giants	PBL	40	24.3	.428	.327	.795	1.9	4.4	1.9	.0	10.6
2018–19	(Belgium) Antwerp Giants	PBL	44	24.2	.423	.368	.725	2.0	5.2	1.6	—	11.5
2019–20	(Germany) Bamberg	BBL	27	25.8	.396	.325	.825	2.0	5.8	1.0	.0	8.4
2020–21	(France) Orléans Loiret	LNB Élite	34	31.5	.442	.408	.861	2.6	7.7	2.0	.1	14.6
2021–22	(France) Monaco	LNB Élite	33	23.3	.423	.413	.871	1.7	4.1	1.3	.0	10.4
2022–23	(Greece) Panathinaikos	GBL	30	25.9	.413	.360	.783	1.9	4.3	2.0	—	11.1
2023–24	(France) ASVEL	LNB Élite	39	26.5	.403	.351	.871	1.7	4.8	1.2	—	11.1

=== College ===
Year	Team	GP	GS	MPG	FG%	3P%	FT%	RPG	APG	SPG	BPG	PPG
2013–14	Illinois State	34	33	27.5	.344	.311	.712	2.0	2.3	1.4	—	6.7
2014–15	Illinois State	34	34	29.8	**.435**	.366	.726	2.4	3.6	**2.4**	**.1**	6.8
2015–16	Illinois State	32	30	30.4	.394	.319	.778	2.7	3.7	1.7	**.1**	11.1
2016–17	Illinois State	**35**	**35**	**30.9**	.421	**.418**	**.784**	**3.7**	**5.0**	1.9	**.1**	**13.0**
Career		135	132	29.6	.400	.362	.758	2.7	3.7	1.8	.1	9.4
