= Lahaou Konaté =

French basketball player

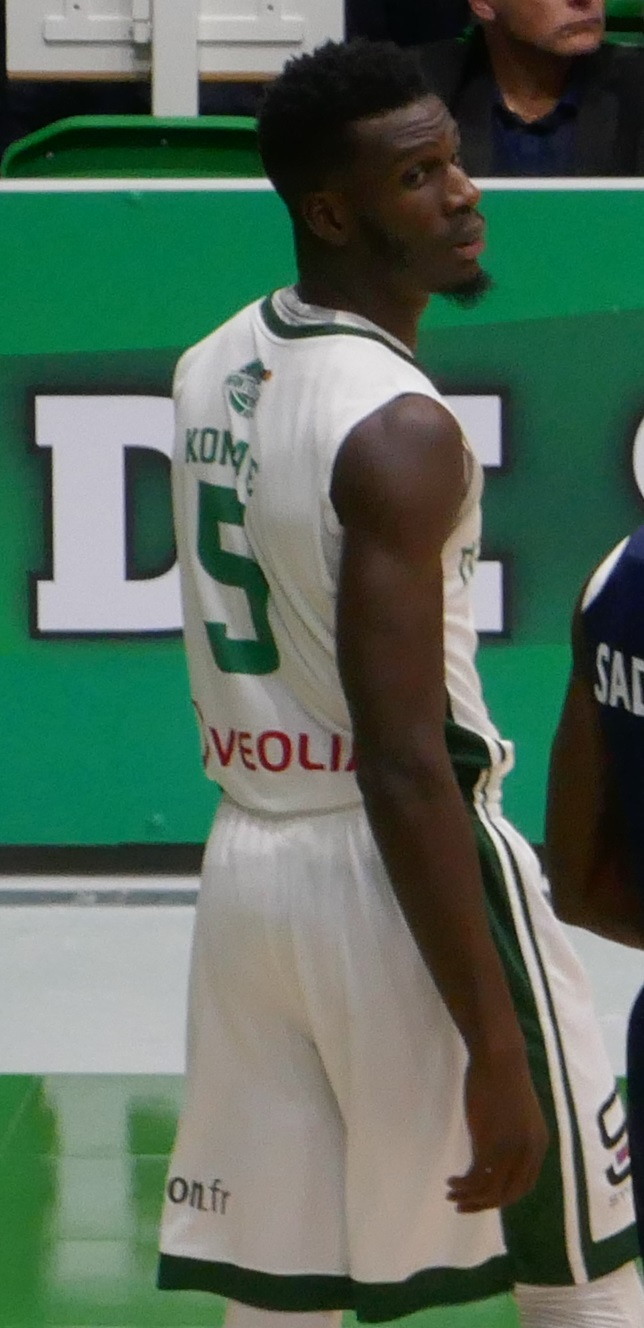
- Konaté with Nanterre 92 in 2017

No. 55 – Metropolitans
- Position: Small forward / shooting guard
- League: Élite 2

Personal information
- Born: 17 November 1991 (age 35) Créteil, France
- Listed height: 1.98 m (6 ft 6 in)
- Listed weight: 85 kg (187 lb)

Career information
- Playing career: 2010–present

Career history
- 2010–2011: Denek Bat Bayonne Urcuit
- 2011–2015: ALM Évreux
- 2015–2017: Le Mans
- 2017–2019: Nanterre 92
- 2019–2020: Canarias
- 2020–2024: Metropolitans 92
- 2024–2026: ESSM Le Portel
- 2026–present: Metropolitans Levallois

Career highlights
- FIBA Intercontinental Cup champion (2020); Pro A Best Defender (2019); All-Champions League Defensive Team (2020)

Lahaou Konaté (born 17 November 1991) is a French professional basketball player for the Metropolitans Levallois of the Élite 2.

== Professional career ==
He previously played for French clubs Hyeres-Toulon, Le Mans Sarthe Basket and Nanterre 92, as well as Spanish club Canarias.

On July 19, 2020, Konaté signed a four-year deal with Metropolitans 92.

On June 10, 2024, he signed with ESSM Le Portel of the LNB Pro A.
