= Kevin Punter =

Serbian-American basketball player (born 1993)

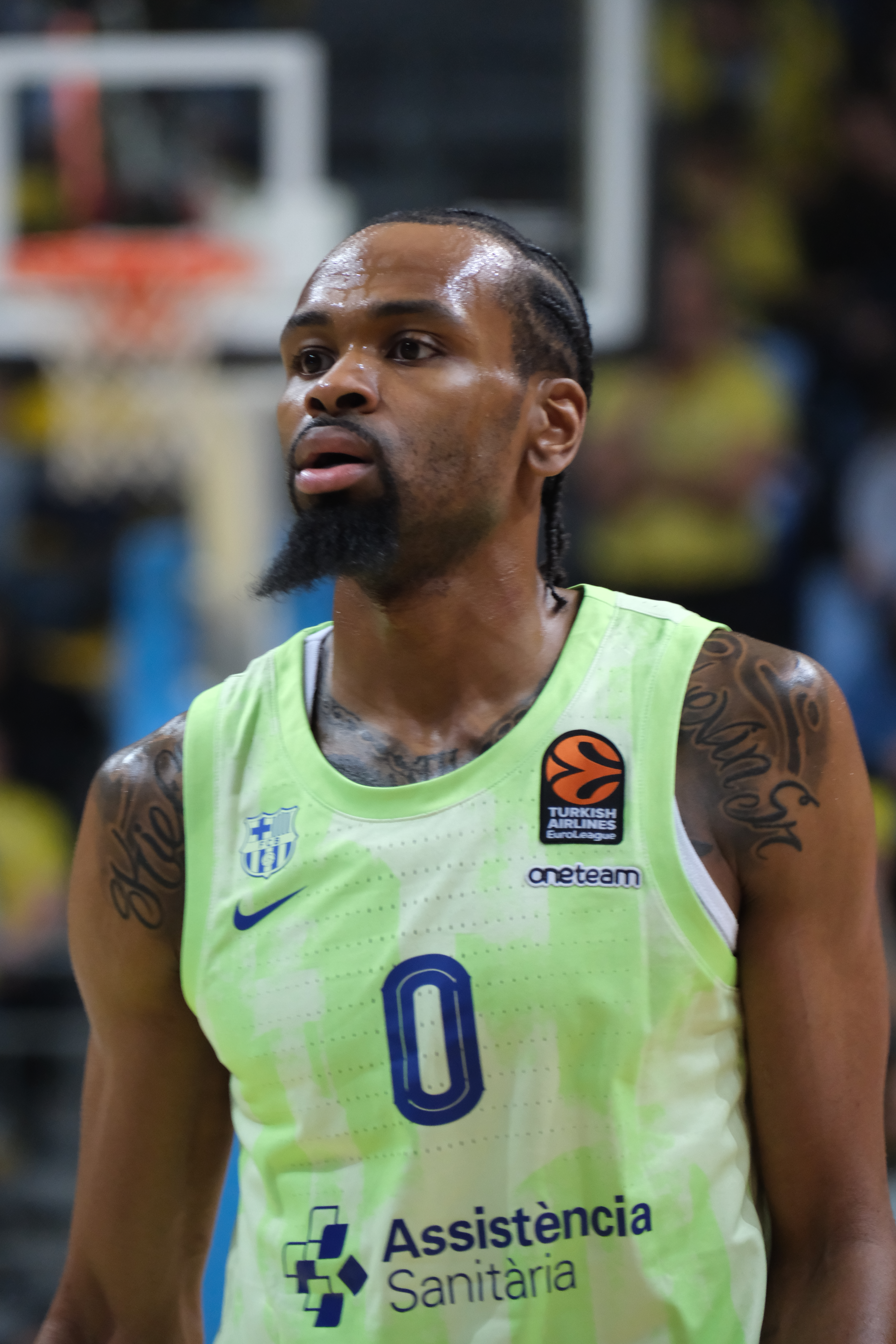
- Punter with FC Barcelona in 2025

No. 0 – FC Barcelona
- Position: Shooting guard
- League: Liga ACB; EuroLeague

Personal information
- Born: June 25, 1993 (age 33) The Bronx, New York, U.S.
- Listed height: 1.92 m (6 ft 4 in)
- Listed weight: 81 kg (179 lb)

Career information
- High school: Salesian (New Rochelle, New York); Body of Christ Academy (Raleigh, North Carolina)
- College: State Fair CC (2012–2014); Tennessee (2014–2016)
- NBA draft: 2016: undrafted
- Playing career: 2016–present

Career history
- 2016–2017: Lavrio
- 2017: Antwerp Giants
- 2017–2018: Rosa Radom
- 2018: AEK Athens
- 2018–2019: Virtus Bologna
- 2019: Olympiacos
- 2019–2020: Crvena zvezda
- 2020–2021: Olimpia Milano
- 2021–2024: Partizan
- 2024–present: FC Barcelona

Career highlights
- All-EuroLeague Second Team (2023); All-EuroCup Second Team (2022); 2× FIBA Champions League champion (2018, 2019); FIBA Champions League Final Four MVP (2019); FIBA Champions League Top Scorer (2018); All-FIBA Champions League First Team (2019); FIBA Champions League All-Decade First Team (2026); ABA League champion (2023); ABA League Finals MVP (2023); 2× All-ABA League Team (2022, 2023); Italian Cup winner (2021); Italian Supercup winner (2020); Greek Cup winner (2018); Second-team All-SEC (2016)

Kevin Xavier Punter Jr. (born June 25, 1993) is a Serbian-American professional basketball player and the team captain for FC Barcelona of the Liga ACB and the EuroLeague. In addition to being a citizen of the United States, Punter also has Serbian citizenship.

After playing two years each of college basketball at State Fair Community College and Tennessee, Punter went undrafted in the 2016 NBA draft. He started his professional career in Europe, where he has played for elite teams like Virtus Bologna, Olympiacos, Crvena zvezda, Olimpia Milano, and Partizan.

== College career ==
After high school, Punter played college basketball at State Fair Community College, from 2012 to 2014, and at the University of Tennessee, with the Tennessee Volunteers. In his senior year at Tennessee, Punter averaged 22.1 points per game, and 3.4 rebounds per game. Though he missed five games of SEC Conference play, he was named Second Team All-SEC, after finishing with the third-highest scoring average (22.1 points per game), and the fourth-highest free-throw percentage (.853), during conference league games.

== Professional career ==
=== Early years ===
After failing to be drafted in the 2016 NBA draft, Punter played with the Minnesota Timberwolves in the 2016 NBA Summer League. In 2016, he signed with Lavrio of the Greek Basket League for 40.000 eur per year. He played in 21 games for Lavrio, averaging 12.2 points, 2.4 rebounds, and 0.9 assists per game. On March 27, 2017, he left Lavrio, and signed with the Antwerp Giants, until the end of the season.

In July 2017, he signed with Rosa Radom. He played in 16 games with Rosa Radom, and went on to average 20.6 points, 3.4 rebounds, and 1.7 assists per game in the FIBA Basketball Champions League. His very good performances gained the interest of the Turkish Super League club Gaziantep, in February but the player didn't leave the team.

=== AEK Athens (2018) ===
On February 10, 2018, he moved to AEK Athens for the rest of the season. With AEK, he won the Greek Cup title, in 2018. On May 6, 2018, Punter also won the FIBA Champions League title. In the final, Punter was one of the best players of his team, scoring 16 points. Over 11 Greek Basket League games, Punter averaged 11.4 points and 2.3 rebounds on 44% shooting from the field.

=== Virtus Bologna (2018–2019) ===
On July 6, 2018, Punter signed a deal with Virtus Bologna for the 2018–19 season. He led the team to winning the Basketball Champions League crown by posting 21 points and eight rebounds in the semifinal over Brose Bamberg, plus 27 points and seven rebounds in the Final against Iberostar Tenerife. He claimed MVP of the Final Four, after also being named to the competition's Star Lineup.

=== Olympiacos (2019) ===
On June 28, 2019, Punter signed a two-year contract with the Greek EuroLeague club Olympiacos. On December 24, 2019, he was released by Olympiacos. Three days later, he signed with the Serbian EuroLeague club Crvena zvezda for the rest of the season. On February 11, 2020, Punter obtained a Serbian passport and Serbian citizenship.

=== Olimpia Milano (2020–2021) ===
On June 18, 2020, Punter signed with the Italian EuroLeague club Olimpia Milano. With Olimpia, he appeared in 36 EuroLeague games, and averaged 14.3 points, 1.6 rebounds and 1.4 assists per game. Olimpia managed to reach the 2021 EuroLeague Final Four, where they won the third place.

=== Partizan (2021–2024) ===
On July 2, 2021, Punter signed a two-year contract with Partizan of the ABA League and the EuroCup.

During the 2022-23 season, Partizan was eliminated by Real Madrid in a tight EuroLeague playoffs series. The playoff series was marred by controversy as a major fight broke out in Game 2, involving players from both teams and resulting in the game being suspended. Punter received a 2 game suspension for his role in the incident. Over the season, Punter averaged 16.1 points, 2.5 assists and 2.1 rebounds per game. Partizan ended the 2022–23 season by lifting the ABA League championship trophy, after a 3–2 winning series over Crvena zvezda in the finals. In the fifth decisive game, Punter scored 32 points, recorded 5 rebounds and 2 assists and was awarded the ABA League Finals MVP.

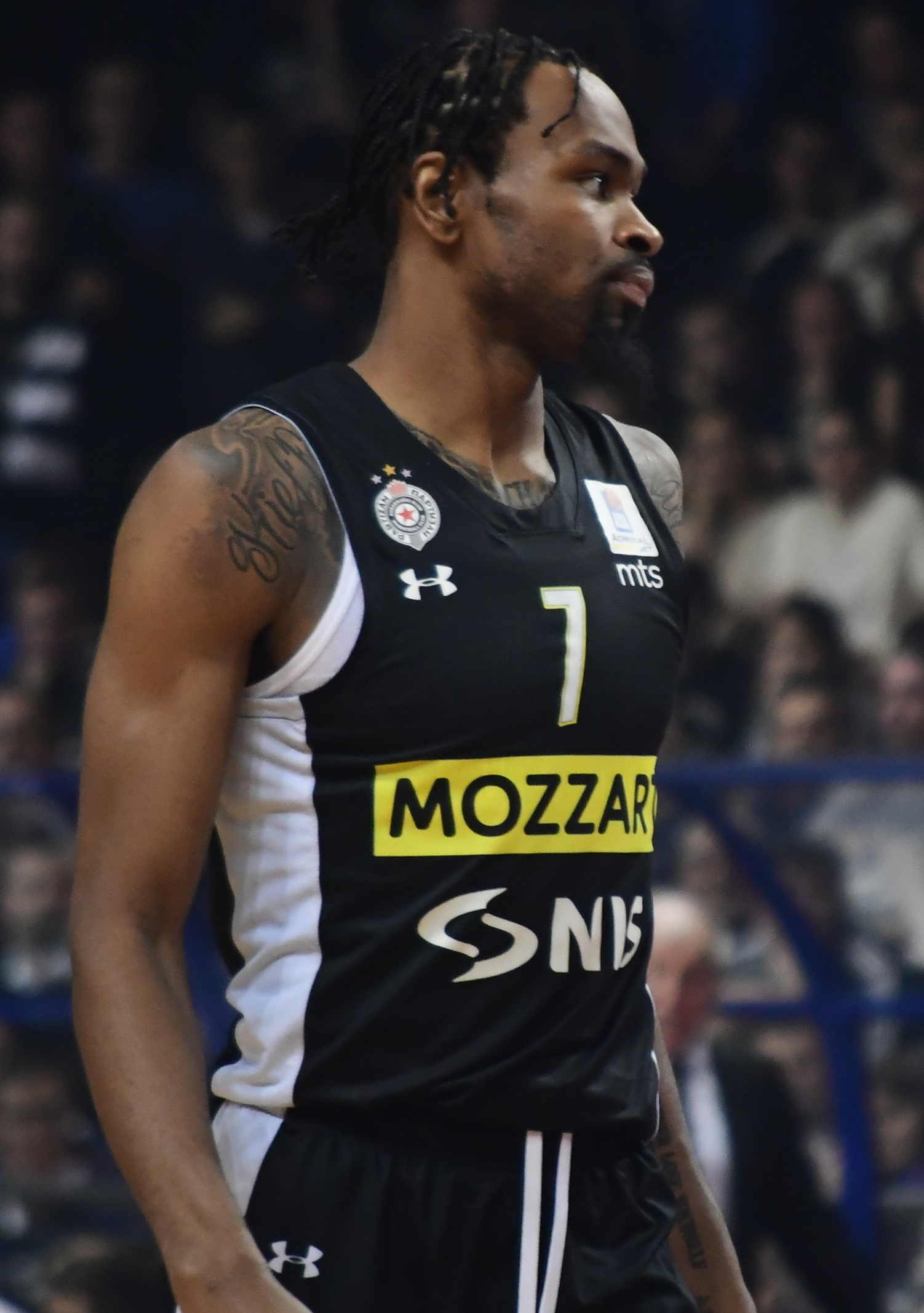
Punter with Partizan in 2022

On June 29, 2023, after negotiations with both Panathinaikos and FC Barcelona, Punter renewed his contract with Partizan for another two years. Over the 2023–24 season, Punter averaged 15 points, and a career-high 2.6 rebounds and 2.6 assists over 28 EuroLeague games. The season was deemed to be unsuccessful for Partizan as they finished the season without lifting any trophy. Despite having one more year left in his contract, Punter was released by Partizan in June 2024.

=== FC Barcelona (2024–present) ===
On June 19, 2024, Punter signed a one-year contract with FC Barcelona of Liga ACB and EuroLeague. In October 2024, he earned the EuroLeague's MVP honors for the first time for his performances during the month of October. He averaged 18.6 points, 1.9 rebounds, 2.4 assists and 1.4 steals.

On April 1, 2025, FC Barcelona announced a three year extension of Punter's contract, linking him to the Catalans until 2028. The announcement highlighted Punter's offensive impact for Barcelona, leading the team in points per game and performance index rating in the EuroLeague regular season.

On December 19, 2025, Punter scored a career-high 43 points to carry Barcelona to victory in a EuroLeague home game against Baskonia after three overtime periods. It was the fourth highest scoring by a single player in the modern EuroLeague and the highest overall score in a EuroLeague game. Recording a PIR of 40, Punter earned the MVP award for round 17 of the 2025–26 EuroLeague. In December 2025, he won his second EuroLeague MVP of the Month award, averaging 24.4 points per game and a PIR of 23. On February 6, 2026, Punter suffered a thigh injury during a EuroLeauge game against Baskonia. He was expected to be sidelined for two to four weeks.

In September 2026, Punter was named team captain for Barcelona, becoming only the second American to ever fulfill the role.

== Career statistics ==
Legend
GP	Games played	GS	Games started	MPG	Minutes per game
FG%	Field-goal percentage	3P%	3-point field-goal percentage	FT%	Free-throw percentage
RPG	Rebounds per game	APG	Assists per game	SPG	Steals per game
BPG	Blocks per game	PPG	Points per game	PIR	Performance index rating
**Bold**	Career high

=== EuroLeague ===
Year	Team	GP	GS	MPG	FG%	3P%	FT%	RPG	APG	SPG	BPG	PPG	PIR
2019–20	Olympiacos	11	3	10.7	.300	.179	.700	1.9	.8	.5	.1	6.8	2.6
2019–20	Crvena zvezda	12	0	22.1	.477	**.481**	.894	1.1	1.5	.6	.1	15.9	13.7
2020–21	Olimpia Milano	36	**33**	24.7	.456	.392	.894	1.6	1.4	.8	.1	14.3	11.6
2022–23	Partizan	**37**	24	27.9	.469	.443	.917	2.1	2.5	1.0	.1	16.1	15.0
2023–24	Partizan	28	24	**29.1**	.463	.350	.902	**2.6**	2.6	1.1	**.2**	15.0	14.2
2024–25	Barcelona	37	33	27.0	**.539**	.386	**.944**	2.2	**3.0**	**1.3**	.0	**16.6**	**14.6**
2025–26	Barcelona	**39**	**39**	27.2	.456	.414	.866	1.8	2.6	1.0	.0	14.8	13.3
Career		200	156	26.0	.456	.396	.899	2.0	2.3	1.0	.1	14.9	13.4

=== EuroCup ===
Year	Team	GP	GS	MPG	FG%	3P%	FT%	RPG	APG	SPG	BPG	PPG	PIR
2021–22	Partizan	17	15	27.1	.460	.289	.875	2.8	2.1	1.0	.1	16.2	16.5
Career		17	15	27.1	.460	.289	.875	2.8	2.1	1.0	.1	16.2	16.5

=== Basketball Champions League ===
Year	Team	GP	GS	MPG	FG%	3P%	FT%	RPG	APG	SPG	BPG	PPG
2017–18	Rosa Radom	14	14	**31.2**	.435	.357	.771	**3.4**	**1.6**	**1.6**	.1	**21.1**
2017–18	AEK Athens	6	0	23.1	**.470**	**.419**	.680	2.2	1.0	1.2	.2	15.3
2018–19	Virtus Bologna	**20**	**20**	27.0	.449	.418	**.807**	3.3	**1.6**	1.1	**.3**	15.9
Career		40	34	27.9	.445	.394	.770	3.2	1.5	1.3	.2	17.7

=== Domestic leagues ===
Year	Team	League	GP	MPG	FG%	3P%	FT%	RPG	APG	SPG	BPG	PPG
2016–17	(Greece) Lavrio	HEBA A1	21	23.2	.445	.432	.800	2.4	.9	.9	.1	12.5
2016–17	(Belgium) Antwerp Giants	PBL	15	23.3	.390	.302	.868	3.1	1.6	1.7	.1	11.1
2017–18	(Poland) Rosa Radom	PLK	20	29.9	.482	.370	.819	4.6	2.3	1.4	.0	19.3
2017–18	(Greece) AEK Athens	HEBA A1	13	19.6	.430	.356	.872	2.1	.8	.9	.1	10.9
2018–19	(Italy) Virtus Bologna	LBA	29	26.5	.418	.345	.894	2.9	1.5	1.1	.1	14.2
2019–20	(Serbia) Crvena zvezda	ABA	8	19.3	.419	.360	.929	1.5	1.7	.9	.1	10.9
2020–21	(Italy) Olimpia Milano	LBA	28	21.9	.414	.395	.844	1.6	1.4	1.0	.1	11.1
2021–22	(Serbia) Partizan	ABA	32	25.7	.417	.350	.885	2.4	3.1	.8	.0	12.5
2022–23	(Serbia) Partizan	ABA	36	22.0	.496	.405	.891	1.9	2.7	1.1	.1	9.9
2023–24	(Serbia) Partizan	KLS	4	18.0	.576	.545	.667	2.5	2.2	.5	.2	11.5
2023–24	(Serbia) Partizan	ABA	27	21.9	.412	.333	.912	2.1	2.7	.8	.1	9.4
2024–25	(Spain) Barcelona	ACB	35	23.0	.488	.462	.908	1.8	2.2	.9	.1	14.1
2025–26	(Spain) Barcelona	ACB	42	23.8	.486	.460	.860	1.7	2.5	1.0	.1	13.0

=== College ===
Year	Team	GP	GS	MPG	FG%	3P%	FT%	RPG	APG	SPG	BPG	PPG
2014–15	Tennessee	**32**	**31**	31.0	.419	.352	.685	2.1	1.9	**1.6**	**.2**	10.3
2015–16	Tennessee	26	26	**34.1**	**.460**	**.369**	**.817**	**3.4**	**3.5**	1.4	**.2**	**22.2**
Career		58	57	32.4	.443	.362	.776	2.7	2.6	1.5	.2	15.6

== Awards and accomplishments ==
=== College career ===
- Second-team All-SEC: (2016)

=== Pro career ===
- 2 x FIBA Champions League Champion: (2018, 2019)
- Basketball Champions League Final Four MVP: (2019)
- Greek Cup Winner: (2018)
- Italian Cup winner (2021)
- Adriatic League champion (2023)
