= Federico Perego =

Italian basketball coach

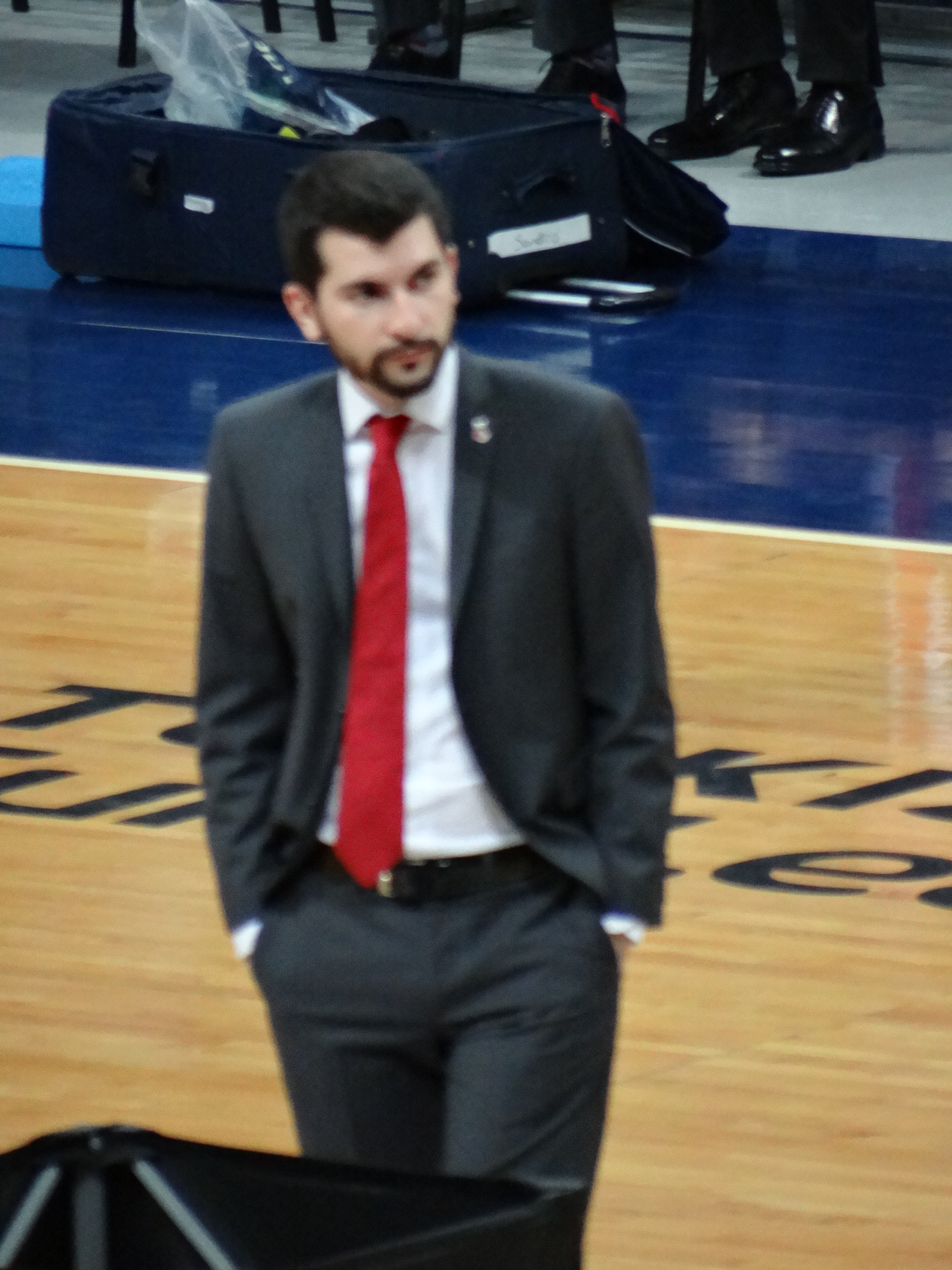

Vanoli Cremona
- Position: Head coach
- League: Lega Basket Serie A

Personal information
- Born: 29 September 1984 (age 42) Lissone, Italy

Career information
- Coaching career: 2008–present

Career history

Coaching
- 2008–2009: Veroli Basket (assistant)
- 2009–2010: Aurora Desio (assistant)
- 2010–2013: Pallacanestro Cantù (assistant)
- 2013–2014: Fulgor Omegna (assistant)
- 2014–2019: Brose Bamberg (assistant)
- 2019: Brose Bamberg
- 2019: VL Pesaro
- 2021–present: Vanoli Cremona (assistant)

Career highlights
- BBL-Pokal champion (2019)

Federico Perego (born 29 September 1984) is an Italian basketball assistant coach for Vanoli Cremona in the Lega Basket Serie A (LBA).

== Career ==
Federico Perego started his coaching career managing the youth sector of Pallacanestro Lissone and Aurora Desio from 2000 to 2008.

He later started a long career as assistant coach of many clubs like Veroli Basket, Aurora Desio, Pallacanestro Cantu (in Serie A) and Fulgor Omegna.

In 2014 Perego became an assistant coach for Andrea Trinchieri in the German club Brose Bamberg of the Basketball Bundesliga. In early 2018 he was assistant coach also for Luca Banchi and in June 2018 for Ainars Bagatskis.

On 13 January 2019 he became head coach for the first time in his career of Brose Bamberg.

On 14 June 2019 Perego signed a deal with the Italian club VL Pesaro. On 5 December 2019 he was replaced by Giancarlo Sacco, after succeed to get any win at his first 12 games with the club.

On 1 July 2021 Perego was appointed by Vanoli Cremona as assistant coach of Paolo Galbiati.

== Honours and titles ==
Assistant coach

- Basketball Bundesliga: 3

Brose Bamberg (2015, 2016, 2017)

Head coach

- German basketball Cup: 1

Brose Bamberg (2019)
