= Ismaël Bako =

Belgian basketball player (born 1995)

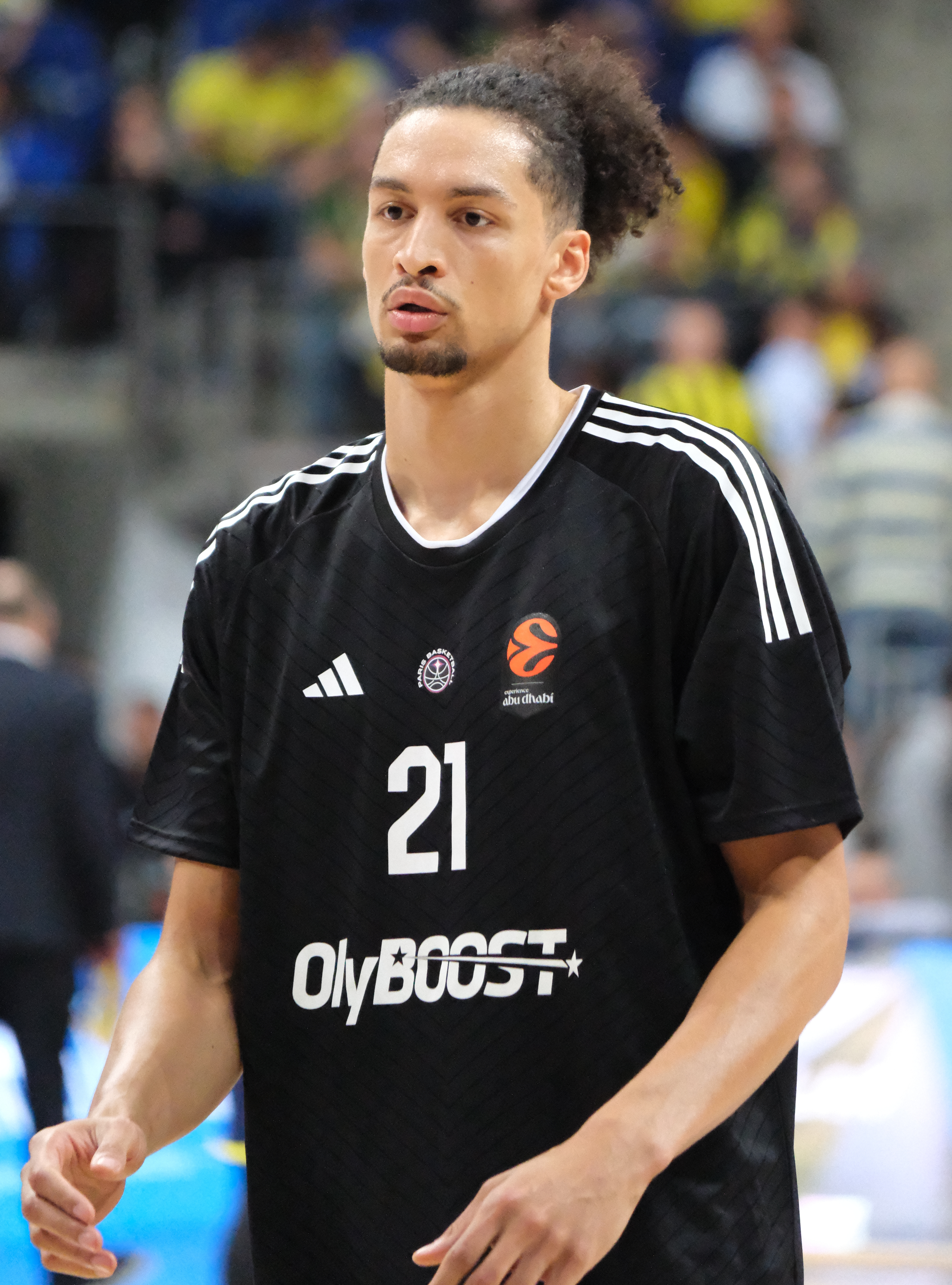
- Bako with Paris Basketball in 2025

No. 28 – Türk Telekom
- Position: Center
- League: BSL; EuroCup

Personal information
- Born: 10 October 1995 (age 31) Leuven, Belgium
- Listed height: 2.08 m (6 ft 10 in)
- Listed weight: 103 kg (227 lb)

Career information
- NBA draft: 2017: undrafted
- Playing career: 2012–present

Career history
- 2012–2017: Leuven Bears
- 2017–2019: Antwerp Giants
- 2019–2021: ASVEL
- 2021–2022: Manresa
- 2022–2023: Virtus Bologna
- 2023–2025: UNICS Kazan
- 2025–2026: Paris Basketball
- 2026: Zenit Saint Petersburg
- 2026–present: Türk Telekom

Career highlights
- All-FIBA Champions League First Team (2019); 2× VTB United League blocks leader (2024, 2025); French League champion (2021); French Cup winner (2021); Italian Supercup winner (2022); Belgian Cup MVP (2019); Belgian Cup winner (2019); Belgian League All-Offensive Team (2019); Belgian League All-Defensive Team (2019); Belgian League Rising Star (2017)

Ismaël Bako (born 10 October 1995) is a Belgian professional basketball player for Türk Telekom of the Turkish Basketbol Süper Ligi (BSL) and the EuroCup. Standing at 208 cm (6 ft 10 in), he plays at the center position. He started his career in 2012 with Leuven Bears and transferred to Antwerp Giants in April 2017.

== Professional career ==
=== Leuven (2012–2017) ===
Bako started his career with Leuven Bears in the Pro Basketball League, making his debut in 2012. He was named the BLB Young Player of the Year of the 2016–17 season, after averaging 8.0 points and 4.1 rebounds per game.

=== Antwerp (2017–2019) ===
In April 2017, he signed with Antwerp Giants. In the 2018–19 season, Bako won the Belgian Basketball Cup with the Giants. He was named the Belgian Cup Most Valuable Player. In the same season, the team reached the Final Four of the Basketball Champions League. Antwerp finished in third place after defeating Brose Bamberg in the third place game. Bako was named to the Basketball Champions League Star Lineup.

=== ASVEL (2019–2021) ===
On 3 July 2019, Bako signed a two-year contract with LDLC ASVEL of the French LNB Pro A and the EuroLeague. He averaged 3.8 points and 2.1 rebounds per game. On 12 June 2020 he re-signed with the team for an additional season. During the 2020–21 season Bako averaged 5.6 points and 3.6 rebounds per game. He parted ways with the team on 11 July 2021.

=== Baxi Manresa (2021–2022) ===
On 24 July 2021 Bako signed a two-year deal with Baxi Manresa of the Spanish Liga ACB. On 5 September 2021 he won the Catalan League and won the MVP of the competition.

=== Virtus Bologna (2022–2023) ===
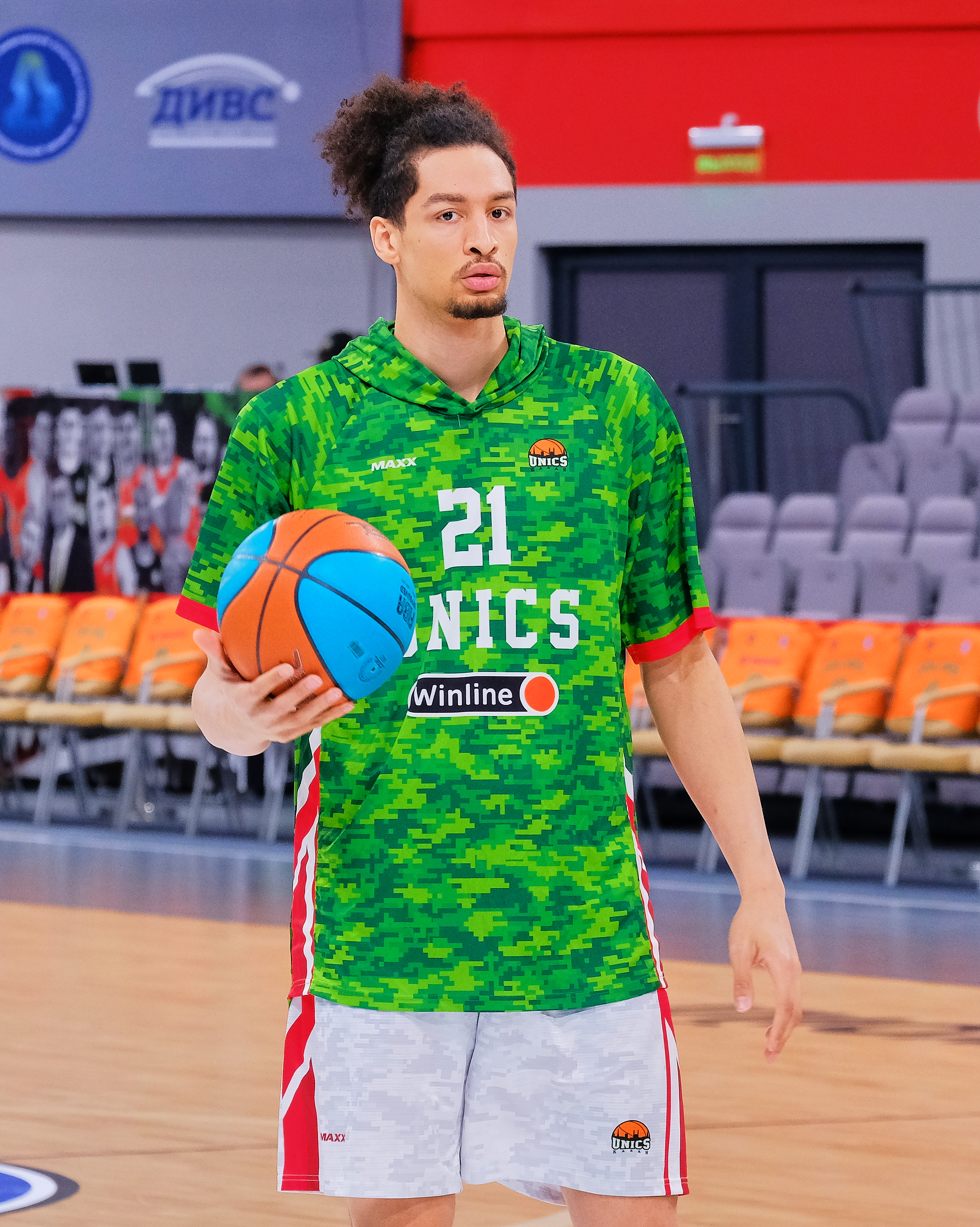

On 13 July 2022 Bako signed with Virtus Bologna of the Lega Basket Serie A and the EuroLeague. On 29 September 2022, after having ousted Olimpia Milano in the semifinals, Virtus won its third Supercup, defeating 72–69 Banco di Sardegna Sassari and achieving a back-to-back, following the 2021 trophy. However, despite good premises Virtus ended the EuroLeague season at the 14th place, thus it did not qualify for the playoffs. Moreover, the team was defeated in the Italian Basketball Cup final by Brescia. In June, after having ousted 3–0 both Brindisi and Tortona, Virtus was defeated 4–3 by Olimpia Milan in the national finals, following a series which was widely regarded among the best in the latest years of Italian basketball. On August 25, 2023, Bako parted ways with the Italian powerhouse.

=== Paris Basketball (2025–2026) ===
On July 8, 2025, after playing two years in Russia, Bako signed with Paris Basketball of the LNB Élite.

=== Zenit Saint Petersburg (2026) ===
On January 23, 2026, Bako signed with Zenit Saint Petersburg of the VTB United League.

=== Türk Telekom (2026–present) ===
On June 19, 2026, he signed with Türk Telekom of the Turkish Basketbol Süper Ligi (BSL).

== National team career ==
Bako has been a member of the Belgian national basketball team since 2016. At 21, Bako was the youngest member of the squad that played at EuroBasket 2017.

== Career statistics ==
Legend
| GP | Games played | GS | Games started | MPG | Minutes per game |
| FG% | Field-goal percentage | 3P% | 3-point field-goal percentage | FT% | Free-throw percentage |
| RPG | Rebounds per game | APG | Assists per game | SPG | Steals per game |
| BPG | Blocks per game | PPG | Points per game | PIR | Performance index rating |
| **Bold** | Career high |

=== EuroLeague ===
| Year | Team | GP | GS | MPG | FG% | 3P% | FT% | RPG | APG | SPG | BPG | PPG | PIR |
|---|---|---|---|---|---|---|---|---|---|---|---|---|---|
| 2019–20 | ASVEL | 24 | 2 | 11.0 | .508 | — | .818 | 2.1 | .3 | .3 | **1.0** | 3.8 | 4.8 |
| 2020–21 | ASVEL | 27 | **3** | 14.4 | .600 | — | **.878** | **3.6** | **.4** | **.5** | .8 | 5.6 | **7.4** |
| 2022–23 | Virtus Bologna | **34** | 0 | **15.5** | **.670** | — | .877 | 2.6 | **.4** | **.5** | .6 | **6.1** | 6.9 |
| 2025–26 | Paris Basketball | 9 | 1 | 9.2 | .615 | — | .438 | 1.9 | .1 | .3 | .7 | 2.6 | 2.6 |
| Career | | 94 | 6 | 13.4 | .607 | — | .825 | 2.7 | .4 | .5 | .7 | 5.0 | 6.1 |

== Personal life ==
Bako was born in Belgium to a Beninese father and Belgian mother.

== Awards and accomplishments ==
=== Club ===
Manresa

- Lliga Catalana de Bàsquet: (2021)

ASVEL

- LNB Pro A: (2021)
- French Cup: (2021)

Antwerp Giants

- Belgian Cup: (2019)

=== Individual ===
- Lliga Catalana de Bàsquet Final MVP: (2021)
- All-Champions League First Team: (2019)
- Belgian Cup MVP: (2019)
- Belgian League Young Player of the Year (2017)
