= Colton Iverson =

American basketball player (born 1989)

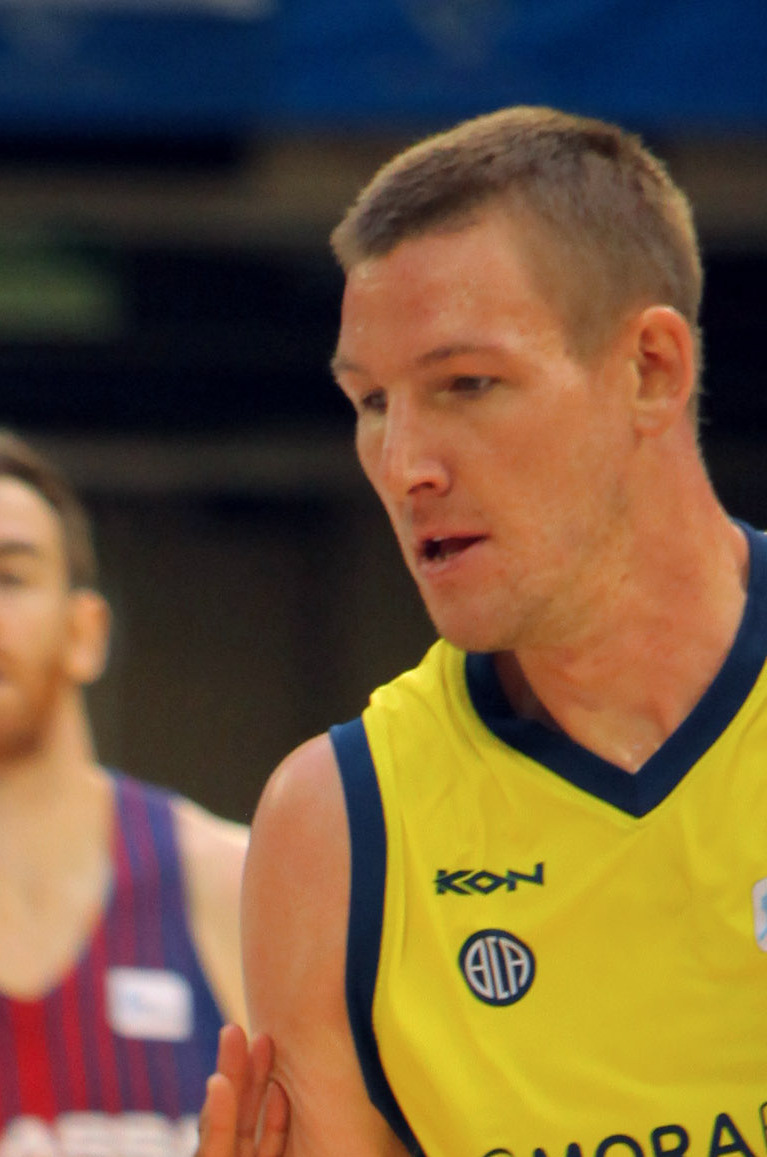
- Iverson with Andorra in 2018

Personal information
- Born: June 29, 1989 (age 37) Aberdeen, South Dakota, U.S.
- Listed height: 7 ft 0 in (2.13 m)
- Listed weight: 255 lb (116 kg)

Career information
- High school: Yankton (Yankton, South Dakota)
- College: Minnesota (2008–2011); Colorado State (2012–2013)
- NBA draft: 2013: 2nd round, 53rd overall pick
- Drafted by: Indiana Pacers
- Playing career: 2013–2022
- Position: Center

Career history
- 2013–2014: Beşiktaş
- 2014–2015: Baskonia
- 2015–2016: Karşıyaka
- 2016–2017: Maccabi Tel Aviv
- 2018: Andorra
- 2018–2019: Canarias
- 2019–2020: Zenit Saint Petersburg
- 2020–2021: New Zealand Breakers
- 2021–2022: Akita Northern Happinets

Career highlights
- All-Champions League Second Team (2019); Israeli Cup winner (2017); AP Honorable mention All-American (2013); First-team All-MWC (2013); MWC Newcomer of the Year (2013)
- Stats at Basketball Reference

Colton Miller Iverson (born June 29, 1989) is an American former professional basketball player. He played college basketball for the University of Minnesota and Colorado State.

== College career ==
Iverson, a 7'0" center, attended Yankton High School in Yankton, South Dakota and originally chose to play basketball at the University of Minnesota for coach Tubby Smith. At Minnesota, Iverson served as a key role player, averaging 5.3 points and 4.3 rebounds per game.

Following his junior year in 2010–11 and seeking more playing time, Iverson decided to transfer to another program for his final season of eligibility, ultimately deciding on Colorado State. At CSU, Iverson became the focal point of the offense, leading the team in scoring (14.2 points per game) and rebounding (9.8 per game). In 2013, Iverson led the Rams to the round of 32 in the NCAA tournament for the first time since 1989. At the close of the season, Iverson was named first team All-Mountain West and an honorable mention All-American by the Associated Press.

== Professional career ==
=== 2013–14 season ===
On June 27, 2013, Iverson was selected with the 53rd overall pick in the 2013 NBA draft by the Indiana Pacers. He was later traded to the Boston Celtics on draft night. In July 2013, he joined the Celtics for the 2013 NBA Summer League.

On August 2, 2013, he signed a one-year deal with Beşiktaş Integral Forex of the Turkish Basketball League.

=== 2014–15 season ===
In July 2014, Iverson re-joined the Boston Celtics for the 2014 NBA Summer League. On August 12, 2014, he signed a one-year deal with an option for a second-year deal with Laboral Kutxa Baskonia of Spain. In his first year in the Liga Endesa, he became the MVP of the week in the round 17, after performing 14 points and 15 rebounds against Rio Natura Monbus Obradoiro.

=== 2015–16 season ===
On July 17, 2015, Laboral Kutxa Baskonia used the option on his contract to keep him for the 2015–16 season. However, on August 14, he signed with Pınar Karşıyaka of Turkey and Baskonia took legal action against him.

On August 25, 2016, the Celtics renounced their rights to Iverson, leaving him available to join another NBA team.

=== 2016–17 season ===
On September 8, 2016, Iverson signed a one-year contract with Israeli club Maccabi Tel Aviv. Iverson helped Maccabi to win the 2017 Israeli State Cup.

=== 2017–18 season ===
On January 24, 2018, Iverson returned to Spain for a second stint, signing with MoraBanc Andorra for the rest of the season.

=== 2018–19 season ===
On July 16, 2018, Iverson signed with Iberostar Tenerife for the 2018–19 season.

=== 2019–20 season ===
On July 11, 2019, Iverson agreed to terms with Zenit Saint Petersburg for the 2019–20 season. He competed in the EuroLeague and the Russian VTB United League. Iverson averaged 6 points and 4 rebounds per game. He parted ways with the team on July 10, 2020.

=== 2020–21 season ===
On September 10, 2020, Iverson signed with the New Zealand Breakers of the Australian National Basketball League (NBL) for the 2020–21 season. In April 2021, he had a game with 22 rebounds, which set an NBL record for the league's 40-minute era.

=== 2021–22 season ===
On June 24, 2021, Iverson signed with the Akita Northern Happinets of the Japanese B.League.

== Career statistics ==
Legend
| GP | Games played | GS | Games started | MPG | Minutes per game |
| FG% | Field-goal percentage | 3P% | 3-point field-goal percentage | FT% | Free-throw percentage |
| RPG | Rebounds per game | APG | Assists per game | SPG | Steals per game |
| BPG | Blocks per game | PPG | Points per game | PIR | Performance index rating |
| **Bold** | Career high |

=== Euroleague ===
| Year | Team | GP | GS | MPG | FG% | 3P% | FT% | RPG | APG | SPG | BPG | PPG | PIR |
|---|---|---|---|---|---|---|---|---|---|---|---|---|---|
| 2014–15 | Baskonia | 24 | 20 | 20.8 | .617 | .000 | .544 | 6.0 | .5 | .5 | .7 | 7.0 | 10.0 |
| 2015–16 | Karşıyaka | 9 | 6 | 17.1 | .581 | .000 | .607 | 4.9 | .6 | .6 | .6 | 9.9 | 11.0 |
| 2016–17 | Maccabi | 30 | 24 | 20.4 | .613 | .000 | .571 | 5.3 | .6 | .8 | .2 | 8.0 | 10.3 |
| Career | | 24 | 20 | 20.8 | .617 | .000 | .544 | 6.0 | .5 | .5 | .7 | 7.0 | 10.0 |

=== Eurocup ===
| Year | Team | GP | GS | MPG | FG% | 3P% | FT% | RPG | APG | SPG | BPG | PPG | PIR |
|---|---|---|---|---|---|---|---|---|---|---|---|---|---|
| 2013–14 | Beşiktaş | 18 | 18 | 20.57 | .565 | .000 | .474 | 5.5 | .7 | .6 | .6 | 8.8 | 9.5 |
| Career | | 18 | 18 | 20.57 | .565 | .000 | .474 | 5.5 | .7 | .6 | .6 | 8.8 | 9.5 |

=== Domestic leagues ===
| Year | Team | GP | GS | MPG | FG% | 3P% | FT% | RPG | APG | SPG | BPG | PPG | PIR |
|---|---|---|---|---|---|---|---|---|---|---|---|---|---|
| 2013–14 | Beşiktaş | 29 | 29 | 14.9 | .511 | .000 | .494 | 4.3 | **.6** | .6 | .2 | 6.2 | – |
| 2014–15 | Baskonia | **37** | **33** | **20** | **.600** | .000 | **.640** | **5.7** | .4 | **.7** | **.5** | **7.0** | 9.6 |
| Career | | 33 | 31 | 17.5 | .555 | .000 | .567 | 5 | .5 | .7 | .4 | 6.6 | 9.6 |
