= Big Bamboo =

Big Bamboo or Big Bambu may refer to:

== Music ==
- Big Bamboo, a calypso song with versions by Lord Creator, The Merrymen, and Mighty Sparrow
- Big Bamboo, a record by Seamus Moore (singer)
- Big Bam Boo a British pop duo

== Other uses ==
- The Big Bamboo, a novel by Tim Dorsey.
- Big Bamboo Lounge, a former bar in Kissimmee, Florida
- Big Bamboo Peak, a fictional group in Zhu Xian (novel)
- Big Bambu, a brand of cigarette rolling paper made by Bambu (rolling papers)
- Big Bambu, an album by comedians Cheech & Chong
- Big Bambú, an art installation by Doug and Mike Starn

== See also ==
- Bamboo (disambiguation)
- Bambú (disambiguation)
- Bambu (disambiguation)
