= 2013 FIBA Intercontinental Cup =

Pinheiros Sky	Olympiacos
(Brazil)	(Greece)
139	167

First leg
Pinheiros Sky	Olympiacos
70	81
- Date: October 4, 2013
- Venue: Ginásio José Corrêa, Barueri
- MVP: (Greece) Vassilis Spanoulis

Second leg
Olympiacos	Pinheiros Sky
86	69
- Date: October 6, 2013
- Venue: Ginásio José Corrêa, Barueri

The 2013 FIBA Intercontinental Cup was the 23rd edition of the FIBA Intercontinental Cup for men's professional basketball clubs and the 22nd edition of the tournament being in the form of a true intercontinental tournament for clubs. The 2 game aggregate score tournament took place at the Ginásio José Corrêa arena in Barueri, São Paulo, Brazil, on October 4 and October 6, 2013, in order to determine the world club champion. The tournament was contested between the 2012–13 season EuroLeague champions, Olympiacos, and the 2013 FIBA Americas League champions, Pinheiros Sky.

== Series summary ==
Game	Date	Home team	Result	Road team
Game 1	October 4	Pinheiros Sky	70–**81**	**Olympiacos**
Game 2	October 6	**Olympiacos**	**86**–69	Pinheiros Sky

Olympiacos won the series 2-0.

=== Game 1 ===
October 4
20:00 UTC−03:00

Box Score

Pinheiros Sky (Brazil)	70–**81**	(Greece) **Olympiacos**
Scoring by quarter: 11–**15**, 17–**19**, 21–**24**, 19–**25**
Pts: Stallworth 26; Rebs: Toyloy 7 Asts: Stallworth, Smith 4		Pts: Spanoulis 18; Rebs: Dunston 12; Asts: Spanoulis 9

Ginásio José Corrêa, Barueri, São Paulo
Attendance: 4,500
Referees: Juan Carlos Arteaga (ESP), José Aníbal Carrión (PUR), Stephen Seibel (CAN)

=== Game 1 Box Score ===
==== Pinheiros Sky ====
Number	Player	Min	FG	3PT	FT	Off	Def	Tot	AS	PF	TO	ST	BS	PTS	PIR
8	Leonardo Morro	12	0-1	0-0	0-0	0	0	0	0	2	1	0	0	0	-2
9	**Paulinho Boracini** **(C)**	32	4-14	0-5	3-4	0	0	0	0	2	3	0	0	11	-3
10	Joe Troy Smith	20	6-11	2-5	5-6	0	0	0	4	1	0	4	0	19	21
12	**Rafa Mineiro**	12	1-8	0-2	0-0	3	1	4	2	5	2	4	1	2	4
14	Lucas Dias	0	0-0	0-0	0-0	0	0	0	0	0	0	0	0	0	0
19	Humberto Silva	0	0-0	0-0	0-0	0	0	0	0	0	0	0	0	0	0
20	Bruno Caboclo	0	0-0	0-0	0-0	0	0	0	0	0	0	0	0	0	0
24	**Shamell Stallworth**	37	10-19	4-9	2-2	0	4	4	4	1	2	0	0	26	23
25	Bruno Mortari	0	0-0	0-0	0-0	0	0	0	0	0	0	0	0	0	0
33	**Steve Toyloy**	23	0-5	0-0	0-0	3	4	7	1	1	1	0	1	0	3
41	André Bambu	10	0-1	0-0	0-0	0	1	1	0	2	0	1	0	0	1
45	**Jonathan Tavernari**	32	4-13	4-13	0-0	2	3	5	1	4	2	4	0	12	11
	**Team totals**	200	25-72	10-34	10-12	8	13	21	12	18	11	13	2	70	58

==== Olympiacos ====
Number	Player	Min	FG	3PT	FT	Off	Def	Tot	AS	PF	TO	ST	BS	PTS	PIR
4	Brent Petway	19	3-5	0-1	1-2	2	7	9	1	3	2	0	1	7	13
6	**Bryant Dunston**	22	5-6	0-0	1-2	3	9	12	1	0	1	0	1	11	22
7	**Vassilis Spanoulis** **(C)**	26	7-13	3-8	1-1	0	1	1	9	2	5	2	0	18	19
8	**Stratos Perperoglou**	26	7-7	1-1	0-0	0	1	1	2	1	4	0	0	15	14
10	Kostas Sloukas	11	0-2	0-0	0-0	0	3	3	2	5	3	0	0	0	0
12	Cedric Simmons	5	1-1	0-0	0-0	0	0	0	0	1	0	0	0	2	2
14	Mirza Begić	13	2-3	0-0	0-0	0	2	2	0	0	0	0	1	4	6
15	**Georgios Printezis**	21	3-6	0-0	0-2	0	4	4	1	1	2	1	0	6	5
16	Dimitrios Agravanis	0	0-0	0-0	0-0	0	0	0	0	0	0	0	0	0	0
17	**Vangelis Mantzaris**	29	2-3	2-3	2-2	0	3	3	4	3	2	0	0	8	12
19	Dimitrios Katsivelis	5	0-2	0-2	0-0	0	1	1	0	0	1	1	0	0	-1
24	Matt Lojeski	24	4-7	1-3	1-2	1	2	3	3	2	2	0	0	10	10
	**Team totals**	200	34-55	7-18	6-11	6	33	39	23	18	22	4	3	81	102

- Starters are listed in **bold**.

=== Game 2 ===
October 6
11:30 UTC−03:00

Box Score

**Olympiacos** (Greece)	**86**–69	(Brazil) Pinheiros Sky
Scoring by quarter: **22**–21, **18**–12, **24**–17, **22**–19
Pts: Printezis 16; Rebs: Dunston 6 Asts: Spanoulis 7		Pts: Stallworth 27; Rebs: Mineiro 9 Asts: Smith 3

Ginásio José Corrêa, Barueri, São Paulo
Attendance: 3,000
Referees: José Aníbal Carrión (PUR), Juan Carlos Arteaga (ESP), Stephen Seibel (CAN)

=== Game 2 Box Score ===
==== Olympiacos ====
Number	Player	Min	FG	3PT	FT	Off	Def	Tot	AS	PF	TO	ST	BS	PTS	PIR
4	Brent Petway	9	3-5	1-2	2-2	0	1	1	0	0	0	1	0	9	9
6	**Bryant Dunston**	16	3-3	0-0	2-2	1	5	6	0	3	3	0	1	8	12
7	**Vassilis Spanoulis** **(C)**	25	1-6	1-4	3-4	0	1	1	7	0	1	1	0	6	8
8	Stratos Perperoglou	17	2-3	0-0	0-0	2	1	3	2	1	1	0	0	4	7
10	Kostas Sloukas	18	0-2	0-1	4-4	0	3	3	3	3	1	0	0	4	7
12	Cedric Simmons	11	4-5	0-0	0-1	1	0	1	0	2	0	0	0	8	7
14	Mirza Begić	12	3-5	0-0	2-2	0	0	0	1	3	1	0	0	8	6
15	Georgios Printezis	19	5-8	2-2	4-4	0	3	3	0	0	1	0	0	16	15
16	**Dimitrios Agravanis**	12	2-3	1-2	0-0	0	0	0	0	3	2	0	0	5	2
17	Vangelis Mantzaris	26	2-5	2-4	4-4	0	6	6	2	2	1	0	0	10	14
19	**Dimitrios Katsivelis**	13	0-0	0-0	4-6	0	3	3	2	2	2	1	0	4	6
24	**Matt Lojeski**	21	1-3	0-1	2-2	0	1	1	1	2	1	1	0	4	4
	**Team totals**	200	26-48	7-16	27-31	4	24	28	18	21	14	4	1	86	97

==== Pinheiros Sky ====
Number	Player	Min	FG	3PT	FT	Off	Def	Tot	AS	PF	TO	ST	BS	PTS	PIR
8	**Leonardo Morro**	18	0-2	0-0	0-0	0	2	2	1	5	0	0	1	0	2
9	**Paulinho Boracini** **(C)**	23	4-11	0-3	0-0	2	4	6	1	4	1	0	0	8	7
10	Joe Troy Smith	27	3-7	0-3	6-6	0	1	1	3	5	3	3	0	12	12
12	**Rafa Mineiro**	31	3-9	1-2	1-3	4	5	9	0	3	5	1	1	8	6
14	Lucas Dias	3	0-0	0-0	0-0	0	0	0	0	0	0	0	0	0	0
19	Humberto Silva	0	0-0	0-0	0-0	0	0	0	0	0	0	0	0	0	0
20	Bruno Caboclo	1	0-0	0-0	0-0	0	0	0	0	1	0	0	0	0	0
24	**Shamell Stallworth**	38	9-14	2-5	7-9	0	1	1	2	2	4	0	0	27	19
25	Bruno Mortari	1	0-0	0-0	0-0	0	0	0	0	0	0	0	0	0	0
33	Steve Toyloy	17	3-3	0-0	0-0	1	3	4	0	1	2	0	0	6	
41	André Bambu	12	1-5	1-2	0-0	1	0	1	0	4	0	0	0	3	0
45	**Jonathan Tavernari**	29	1-8	1-5	2-2	1	3	4	0	2	1	0	0	5	1
	**Team totals**	200	24-59	5-20	16-20	9	19	28	7	27	16	4	2	69	47

- Starters are listed in **bold**.

2013 FIBA Intercontinental Cup Champions

**Olympiacos**
**1st title**

== Rosters ==
Olympiacos	Pinheiros Sky

Olympiacos
Pos	No.	Player
PF	4	(United States) Brent Petway
F/C	6	(Armenia) / (United States) Bryant Dunston
PG/SG	7	(Greece) Vassilis Spanoulis (C)
F	8	(Greece) Stratos Perperoglou
PG/SG	10	(Greece) Kostas Sloukas
F/C	12	(Bulgaria) / (United States) Cedric Simmons
C	14	(Slovenia) / (Bosnia and Herzegovina) Mirza Begić
PF	15	(Greece) Georgios Printezis
PF	16	(Greece) Dimitrios Agravanis
PG/SG	17	(Greece) Vangelis Mantzaris
PG/SG	19	(Greece) Dimitrios Katsivelis
G/F	24	(Belgium) / (United States) Matt Lojeski
Did not play
G/F	20	(Greece) / (Cyprus) Antreas Christodoulou – Coach's decision
Did not travel with the team to Brazil
PG/SG	5	(United States) Acie Law – Knee injury
SF	9	(Greece) Ioannis Papapetrou – Broken nose
C	11	(Greece) Dimitrios Mavroeidis - Knee surgery
Head coach:
(Greece) Georgios Bartzokas
Assistant coaches:
(Greece) / (Serbia) Milan Tomić
(Greece) Christos Pappas
(Greece) Christos Marmarinos

Pinheiros Sky
Pos	No.	Player
C	8	(Brazil) Leonardo Morro
PG	9	(Brazil) / (Italy) Paulinho Boracini (C)
PG/SG	10	(United States) Joe Troy Smith
F/C	12	(Brazil) Rafa Mineiro
F	14	(Brazil) Lucas Dias
F	20	(Brazil) Bruno Caboclo
G/F	24	(Brazil) / (United States) Shamell Stallworth
PG	25	(Brazil) Bruno Mortari
F/C	33	(United States) Steve Toyloy
F	41	(Brazil) André Bambu
G/F	45	(Brazil) / (Italy) Jonathan Tavernari
Did not play
PG	5	(Brazil) Pedro Wellausen – Coach's decision
PG/SG	19	(Brazil) Humberto Silva – Coach's decision
C	21	(Brazil) Wesley Carnieto – Coach's decision
C	50	(Brazil) Felipe Rech – Coach's decision
G/F		(Brazil) Guilherme Martins – Coach's decision
PG		(Brazil) Ricardo Barbosa – Coach's decision
G/F		(Brazil) Daniel Severo – Coach's decision
Head coach:
(Brazil) Cláudio Mortari
Assistant coaches:
(Brazil) Cesar Guidetti
(Brazil) Jose Luiz Marcondes
(Brazil) Brenno Brassioli

== MVP ==
- (Greece) Vassilis Spanoulis - ( (Greece) Olympiacos)
