= The Stingray Shuffle =

2003 novel by Tim Dorsey

- Cover of the US edition of The Stingray Shuffle
- Author: Tim Dorsey
- Language: English
- Genre: Crime novel
- Publisher: William Morrow (USA) & Robert Hale (UK)
- Publication date: February 2003 (US) & December 2003 (UK)
- Publication place: United States
- Media type: Print (Hardback & Paperback)
- Pages: 320 pp (USA hardback edition)
- ISBN: 0-06-052045-0 (USA hardback edition) & ISBN ? (UK paperback edition)
- OCLC: 50072589
- Dewey Decimal: 813/.54 21
- LC Class: PS3554.O719 S87 2003
- Preceded by: Triggerfish Twist
- Followed by: Cadillac Beach

The Stingray Shuffle is Tim Dorsey's fifth novel, published in 2003. It is the fifth novel to feature criminal Serge A. Storms, and also concludes the story arc, begun in the first novel, Florida Roadkill, about Serge's pursuit of a briefcase containing $5 million.

== Plot summary ==
Novelist Ralph Krunkleton has never been more than marginally successful, but his publishers are surprised to see sales of his novel The Stingray Shuffle soaring in a small bookstore in Miami Beach, Florida, called "The Palm Reader". The book's publishers mount a publicity blitz culminating in a train journey with the author from New York to Miami. What they do not realize is that no one is reading the book; the owners of the bookstore are selling packets of cocaine in hollowed-out paperback copies of Shuffle, trusting that no legitimate customer will ask for such an obscure title. Unfortunately, the publicity campaign sparks a reading at the store with Krunkleton as the guest speaker, where the cocaine in the books is discovered and the owners are forced to close and flee the county.

The owners - five former KGB agents dismissed from intelligence work for gross stupidity - are then recruited by "Mr. Grande", the head of the Mierda Cartel (the smallest in the world) to track down a briefcase containing $5 million in cash that was accidentally paid out by the insurance company that was laundering the Cartel's earnings. The briefcase was last seen at the conclusion of Hammerhead Ranch Motel, in the possession of private investigator Paul and Ernest Hemingway-impersonator Jethro Maddox. Also on the trail of the briefcase are Serge and his traveling companion, Don Johnson-impersonator Lenny Lipowicz.

The briefcase changes hands several times, and Paul, Jethro, and several of the Russians are killed, before their leader, Ivan, finally gets the briefcase from Serge (who was hoping to use the money to buy a trip into space and a monogrammed spacesuit from the Russians) and takes it to New York planning to buy a former Soviet submarine that Mr. Grande has promised to a larger, Colombian cartel for drug trafficking. Serge leaves Lenny at his mother's home and follows Ivan's trail to New York.

While searching for the briefcase, Serge encounters five single mothers from Miami, who have been best friends since college and now formed a book club. They have traveled to Manhattan to attend the New Year's Eve celebration in Times Square and then join the Krunkleton book tour on its way back to Florida. The women are instantly taken with Serge, and he seduces one of them, Samantha, who invites him to join them aboard the Silver Stingray.

Ivan inadvertently switches the briefcase with an identical one carried by a bathroom attendant; when the attendant peeks inside and sees the money, he flees New York on the first available train, the Silver Stingray. Searching the attendant's apartment, Ivan and a Jamaican gang leader, "Zig-Zag", hear a message on his answering machine confirming the train booking.

Hijinks ensue aboard the train, which has been set up as a mystery tour loosely based on one of Krunkelton's books. These include Ivan and Zigzag jumping their car onto the roof of the train from an overhanging bridge, and Serge feverishly searching the train's staterooms for the briefcase. In the finale, the train derails, and Serge, "in character" as the mystery tour's detective, dramatically announces that one of the other actors, a washed-up hypnotist named Preston, was actually murdered rather than killed in the crash. Serge then deduces that Preston was the man who impregnated each member of the book club in college years ago, and they signed up for the tour not just to meet Krunkelton, but to confront Preston. At first, they believe he is accusing one of them of the murder, but he confesses that he killed Preston himself, as just punishment for his treatment of them. Then the unstable train lurches again, and Serge hits his head, becoming amnesiac. He wanders off the train in a daze, and Samantha discovers the briefcase hidden with her luggage.

A few months later, the five women are living large, having shared the $5 million between themselves. When they meet again to discuss Ralph Krunkelton's latest novel (a lurid potboiler inspired by his sudden notoriety after the train crash), they raise a toast to Serge, wherever he may be.

In fact, Serge is camping on an off-limits island off the Florida coast, giving history lessons to its population of test monkeys.

=== Johnny Vegas ===
Several of Dorsey's novels features one or more failed attempts by his recurring character, Johnny Vegas, to finally lose his virginity. In this novel:

- Johnny takes a girl to a mini-golf course, pretending to be a golf pro; they try to have sex in the range cart, but as it makes its way onto the course, it becomes a target for the other golfers, causing the woman to jump out in fear before getting hit on the head with a ball;
- Johnny tries to have sex with a female book reviewer aboard the Silver Stingray, but when the train derails, both Johnny and the woman are unharmed, but the woman is too shaken to continue.
- On a speed boat, Vegas takes a woman to the small island. High on cocaine, the woman takes off her clothes and runs onto the island. Just as Johnny follows, the pair are attacked by the test monkeys.
- Johnny also recalls two failures from his past:
  - Trying to have sex with a Cuban girl in Little Havana, before being interrupted by the FBI's removal of Elián González from his relatives' home nearby.
  - Trying to have sex with a female attorney, who becomes irretrievably distracted by the news of the Supreme Court's ruling against Al Gore in the 2000 presidential election.
