= 2011 Liga Sudamericana de Básquetbol =

Liga Sudamericana de Básquetbol
- Season: 2011
- Dates: 6 October 2011 – 5 February 2012
- Teams: 12

Finals
- Champions: (Argentina) Obras Sanitarias (1st title)
- Runners-up: (Brazil) Pinheiros
- Semifinalists: (Brazil) Brasília (Argentina) Atenas

The 2011 Liga Sudamericana de Básquetbol, or 2011 FIBA South American League, was the sixteenth edition of the second-tier tournament for basketball teams from South America. The tournament began on 6 October 2011 and finished on 5 February 2012. Argentine club Obras Sanitarias won the tournament, defeating Brazilian club Pinheiros in the Grand Final.

== Format ==
Teams were split into three groups of four teams each and played in a single round-robin format. Each group played all their games in a single host city. The top two teams from each group advanced to the second stage, where two groups of three teams were formed. The top two teams from each group advanced to the semifinals, which consisted of single-elimination playoffs, where the champion was decided. An extra match was played for third place between the losing teams from the semifinals.

== Teams ==
Country	Team
Argentina	Atenas (2nd)
Argentina	Obras Sanitarias (WC)
Bolivia	Amistad
Brazil	Flamengo (2nd)
Brazil	Pinheiros (WC)
Brazil	Brasília (1st)
Chile	Boston College
Colombia	Orgullo Paisa
Ecuador	UTE
Uruguay	Biguá (WC)
Uruguay	Malvín (2nd)
Venezuela	Centauros de Apure

== Group stage ==
=== Group A ===
Pos	Team	Pld	W	L	Pts	Qualification
1	(Argentina) Obras Sanitarias	3	3	0	6	Advances to second stage
2	(Brazil) Pinheiros	3	2	1	5	Advances to second stage
3	(Uruguay) Biguá	3	1	2	4	
4	(Colombia) Orgullo Paisa	3	0	3	3	

Source: FIBA Archive

6 October 2011
17:30

Report

Club Biguá (Uruguay)	59–87	(Argentina) Obras Sanitarias
Scoring by quarter: 13–22, 12–19, 16–14, 18–32
Pts: Taboada 14; Rebs: Humphrey 7 Asts: García Morales 5		Pts: Elsener 16; Rebs: Field 10; Asts: Osimani 4

Ginásio Poliesportivo Henrique Villaboim, São Paulo, Brazil

6 October 2011
20:00

Report

Pinheiros (Brazil)	90–65	(Colombia) Orgullo Paisa
Scoring by quarter: 22–21, 21–7, 26–14, 21–23
Pts: Shamell 23; Rebs: Di Pacce Dos Santos 11; Asts: 3 players 5		Pts: Flores Salas 22; Rebs: Flores Salas 8 Asts: Guillen Ecker 4

Ginásio Poliesportivo Henrique Villaboim, São Paulo, Brazil

7 October 2011
17:30

Report

Obras Sanitarias (Argentina)	92–62	(Colombia) Orgullo Paisa
Scoring by quarter: 24–11, 23–12, 17–29, 28–10
Pts: Mázzaro 21; Rebs: Espinoza 7 Asts: Mázzaro 7		Pts: Flores Salas 16; Rebs: Flores Salas 9 Asts: Guillen Ecker 5

Ginásio Poliesportivo Henrique Villaboim, São Paulo, Brazil

7 October 2011
20:00

Report

Pinheiros (Brazil)	99–76	(Uruguay) Club Biguá
Scoring by quarter: 19–23, 26–17, 29–16, 25–20
Pts: Vinicius 25; Rebs: Fiorotto, Olivinha 7 Asts: Figueroa 6		Pts: García Morales 18; Rebs: Humphrey 6 Asts: Vidal Casaretto 4

Ginásio Poliesportivo Henrique Villaboim, São Paulo, Brazil

8 October 2011
17:30

Report

Club Biguá (Uruguay)	96–90	(Colombia) Orgullo Paisa
Scoring by quarter: 21–28, 28–20, 23–17, 24–25
Pts: García Morales 23; Rebs: Calfani, Humphrey 5 Asts: Taboada, Vidal Casaretto 4		Pts: Guillen Ecker 24; Rebs: Guillen Ecker 7 Asts: Guillen Ecker, Ortiz 4

Ginásio Poliesportivo Henrique Villaboim, São Paulo, Brazil

8 October 2011
20:00

Report

Pinheiros (Brazil)	80–82	(Argentina) Obras Sanitarias
Scoring by quarter: 25–19, 19–23, 8–22, 28–20
Pts: Shamell 18; Rebs: Olivinha 12; Asts: Figueroa 7		Pts: Gutiérrez, Maye 18; Rebs: Gutiérrez 12; Asts: Osimani 5

Ginásio Poliesportivo Henrique Villaboim, São Paulo, Brazil

=== Group B ===
Pos	Team	Pld	W	L	Pts	Qualification
1	(Uruguay) Malvín	3	3	0	6	Advances to second stage
2	(Brazil) Brasília	3	2	1	5	Advances to second stage
3	(Venezuela) Centauros de Apure	3	1	2	4	
4	(Bolivia) Amistad	3	0	3	3	

Source: FIBA Archive

13 October 2011
17:30

Report

Brasília (Brazil)	71–70	(Venezuela) Centauros
Scoring by quarter: 18–16, 18–12, 22–27, 13–15
Pts: Ribeiro 21; Rebs: Giovannoni 13; Asts: Welington 14		Pts: Elliott 16; Rebs: Broxsie 8 Asts: Cobos 2

Gimnasio Juan Fco. Canil, Montevideo, Uruguay

13 October 2011
21:30

Report

Club Malvín (Uruguay)	90–70	(Bolivia) Amistad
Scoring by quarter: 25–17, 17–14, 34–16, 14–23
Pts: Martinez 21; Rebs: Myles 11; Asts: Jeffries 8		Pts: Myvett 22; Rebs: Myvett 11; Asts: Acosta 7

Gimnasio Juan Fco. Canil, Montevideo, Uruguay

14 October 2011
20:00

Report

Amistad (Bolivia)	59–121	(Brazil) Brasília
Scoring by quarter: 3–33, 25–25, 13–29, 18–34
Pts: Sandoval 18; Rebs: Myvett, Devaughn 6 Asts: Myvett 4		Pts: Oliveira 28; Rebs: Reis 10; Asts: Vieira 12

Gimnasio Juan Fco. Canil, Montevideo, Uruguay

14 October 2011
22:15

Report

Centauros (Venezuela)	69–71	(Uruguay) Club Malvín
Scoring by quarter: 9–16, 10–16, 29–25, 21–14
Pts: Romero 16; Rebs: Romero 9 Asts: Centeno 3		Pts: Borsellino, Martínez 16; Rebs: Smith 11; Asts: Martínez, Fitipaldo 5

Gimnasio Juan Fco. Canil, Montevideo, Uruguay

15 October 2011
19:15

Report

Amistad (Bolivia)	65–104	(Venezuela) Centauros
Scoring by quarter: 14–22, 18–29, 16–34, 17–19
Pts: Devaughn 21; Rebs: Devaughn 9 Asts: Romero 6		Pts: Romero 24; Rebs: Romero 14; Asts: Farías 13

Gimnasio Juan Fco. Canil, Montevideo, Uruguay

15 October 2011
21:30

Report

Club Malvín (Uruguay)	87–85	(Brazil) Brasília
Scoring by quarter: 14–17, 22–21, 18–20, 33–27
Pts: Martinez 26; Rebs: Smith, Newsome 10; Asts: Martínez 8		Pts: Welington 18; Rebs: Giovannoni 8 Asts: Welington 8

Gimnasio Juan Fco. Canil, Montevideo, Uruguay

=== Group C ===
Pos	Team	Pld	W	L	Pts	Qualification
1	(Argentina) Atenas	3	2	1	5	Advances to second stage
2	(Brazil) Flamengo	3	2	1	5	Advances to second stage
3	(Ecuador) UTE	3	1	2	4	
4	(Chile) Boston College	3	1	2	4	

Source: FIBA Archive

3 November 2011
19:30

Report

Flamengo (Brazil)	109–77	(Ecuador) U.T.E
Scoring by quarter: 30–21, 22–15, 28–22, 29–19
Pts: Barbosa 22; Rebs: Kammerichs 11; Asts: Machado 6		Pts: Smith 24; Rebs: Smith 9 Asts: Cárdenas 5

Polideportivo Municipal Carlos Cerutti, Córdoba, Argentina

3 November 2011
21:30

Report

Atenas (Argentina)	73–78	(Chile) Boston College
Scoring by quarter: 15–26, 21–14, 13–22, 24–16
Pts: Hayes 13; Rebs: Garcés 6 Asts: Sucatzky, Lábaque 4		Pts: Carrasco 20; Rebs: Smith 9 Asts: Lara 2

Polideportivo Municipal Carlos Cerutti, Córdoba, Argentina

4 November 2011
19:30

Report

Boston College (Chile)	44–97	(Brazil) Flamengo
Scoring by quarter: 10–26, 9–22, 13–22, 12–27
Pts: Shipley 10; Rebs: Smith 6 Asts: Rivera, Hernandez 1		Pts: Jackson Jr 26; Rebs: Silveira, Kammerichs 11; Asts: Barbosa 5

Polideportivo Municipal Carlos Cerutti, Córdoba, Argentina

4 November 2011
21:30

Report

U.T.E (Ecuador)	82–120	(Argentina) Atenas
Scoring by quarter: 22–33, 17–30, 23–28, 20–29
Pts: Danridge 23; Rebs: Fleming 6 Asts: 3 players 2		Pts: Rivero 17; Rebs: Garces 9 Asts: Lábaque 10

Polideportivo Municipal Carlos Cerutti, Córdoba, Argentina

5 November 2011
17:00

Report

Boston College (Chile)	92–101	(Ecuador) U.T.E
Scoring by quarter: 24–26, 13–20, 21–23, 34–32
Pts: Carrasco 28; Rebs: Valencia 7 Asts: Carrasco 4		Pts: Danridge 31; Rebs: García, Smith 6 Asts: Cárdenas 4

Polideportivo Municipal Carlos Cerutti, Córdoba, Argentina

5 November 2011
19:00

Report

Atenas (Argentina)	83–74	(Brazil) Flamengo
Scoring by quarter: 18–22, 18–17, 24–26, 23–9
Pts: Hayes 15; Rebs: Garcés 9 Asts: Lescano, Sucatzky 4		Pts: Machado 25; Rebs: Kammerichs 10; Asts: Jackson Jr 4

Polideportivo Municipal Carlos Cerutti, Córdoba, Argentina

== Second stage ==
=== Group 1 ===
Pos	Team	Pld	W	L	Pts	Qualification
1	(Brazil) Pinheiros	3	2	1	5	Advances to semifinals
2	(Argentina) Atenas	3	2	1	5	Advances to semifinals
3	(Brazil) Flamengo	3	2	1	5	

Source: FIBA Archive

1 February 2012
19:30

Report

Flamengo (Brazil)	59–74	(Brazil) Pinheiros
Scoring by quarter: 12–12, 12–16, 15–23, 20–23
Pts: Machado 16; Rebs: Kammerichs 15; Asts: Kammerichs 4		Pts: Marquinhos, Olivinha 12; Rebs: Marquinhos 10; Asts: Figueroa, Shamell 5

Estadio Obras Sanitarias, Buenos Aires, Argentina

2 February 2012
20:00

Report

Atenas (Argentina)	65–63	(Brazil) Pinheiros
Scoring by quarter: 19–11, 9–14, 20–23, 17–15
Pts: Melvin 17; Rebs: Melvin 11; Asts: Melvin 10		Pts: Olivinha 19; Rebs: Olivinha 11; Asts: Marquinhos 5

Estadio Obras Sanitarias, Buenos Aires, Argentina

3 February 2012
19:30

Report

Atenas (Argentina)	68–71	(Brazil) Flamengo
Scoring by quarter: 13–18, 14–13, 17–23, 24–17
Pts: Melvin 22; Rebs: Gerlero 10; Asts: Lábaque 8		Pts: Kammerichs 20; Rebs: Kammerichs 11; Asts: Kammerichs 5

Estadio Obras Sanitarias, Buenos Aires, Argentina

=== Group 2 ===
Pos	Team	Pld	W	L	Pts	Qualification
1	(Argentina) Obras Sanitarias	2	2	0	4	Advances to semifinals
2	(Brazil) Brasília	2	1	1	3	Advances to semifinals
3	(Uruguay) Malvín	2	0	2	2	

Source: FIBA Archive

1 February 2012
22:00

Report

Obras Sanitarias (Argentina)	89–59	(Uruguay) Malvín
Scoring by quarter: 21–14, 19–11, 30–14, 19–20
Pts: Fells, Mázzaro 15; Rebs: Elsener, Espinoza 5 Asts: Osimani 4		Pts: Borsellino 13; Rebs: Borsellino 10; Asts: Borsellino 3

Estadio Obras Sanitarias, Buenos Aires, Argentina

2 February 2012
19:30

Report

Malvín (Uruguay)	68–77	(Brazil) Brasília
Scoring by quarter: 17–21, 11–14, 8–26, 32–16
Pts: Frost 16; Rebs: Frost 12; Asts: Jeffries 3		Pts: Belchor Silva 23; Rebs: Belchor Silva 7 Asts: Welington 10

Estadio Obras Sanitarias, Buenos Aires, Argentina

3 February 2012
19:30

Report

Obras Sanitarias (Argentina)	73–51	(Brazil) Brasília
Scoring by quarter: 18–14, 22–17, 11–15, 22–5
Pts: Field 18; Rebs: Espinoza 7 Asts: Five players 2		Pts: Belchor Silva, Garcia 8 Rebs: Rodrigues Reis, Santos Cipriano 10; Asts: Santos Cipriano 2

Estadio Obras Sanitarias, Buenos Aires, Argentina

== Final stage ==
=== Bracket ===
Semifinals
(Brazil) Pinheiros	60
(Brazil) Brasília	55
(Argentina) Obras Sanitarias	68
(Argentina) Atenas	58

Grand Finals
(Brazil) Pinheiros	73
(Argentina) Obras Sanitarias	88
Third place
(Brazil) Brasília	76
(Argentina) Atenas	74

=== Semifinals ===
4 February 2012
19:00

Report

Pinheiros (Brazil)	60–55	(Brazil) Brasília
Scoring by quarter: 13–12, 12–13, 17–14, 18–16
Pts: Marquinhos 16; Rebs: Marquinhos 11; Asts: Marquinhos, Paulinho 3		Pts: Welington 22; Rebs: Tisher 9 Asts: Belchor Silva 2

Estadio Obras Sanitarias, Buenos Aires, Argentina

4 February 2012
21:00

Report

Obras Sanitarias (Argentina)	68–58	(Argentina) Atenas
Scoring by quarter: 16–12, 9–19, 23–10, 20–17
Pts: Washam 23; Rebs: Fells, Gutiérrez 9 Asts: Osimani 5		Pts: Gerlero, Melvin 13; Rebs: Melvin 13; Asts: Lescano, Sucatzky 3

Estadio Obras Sanitarias, Buenos Aires, Argentina

=== Third place match ===
5 February 2012
19:30

Report

Brasília (Brazil)	76–74	(Argentina) Atenas
Scoring by quarter: 14–24, 21–19, 22–18, 19–13
Pts: Garcia 22; Rebs: Santos Cipriano 12; Asts: Santos Cipriano, Welington 3		Pts: Lescano 16; Rebs: Humphrey 9 Asts: Sucatzky 6

Estadio Obras Sanitarias, Buenos Aires, Argentina

=== Grand Final ===
5 February 2012
22:00

Report

Pinheiros (Brazil)	73–88	(Argentina) Obras Sanitarias
Scoring by quarter: 22–26, 9–19, 25–25, 17–18
Pts: Marquinhos 18; Rebs: Marquinhos 6 Asts: Pires 3		Pts: Washam 23; Rebs: Field, Gutiérrez 9 Asts: Three players 2

Estadio Obras Sanitarias, Buenos Aires, Argentina
