= Torpedo Juice (novel) =

2005 novel by Tim Dorsey

- Cover of the US edition
- Author: Tim Dorsey
- Language: English
- Genre: Crime novel
- Publisher: William Morrow
- Publication date: January 18, 2005
- Publication place: United States
- Media type: Print (Hardback)
- Pages: 336 pp
- ISBN: 0-06-058560-9
- OCLC: 55510766
- Dewey Decimal: 813/.54 22
- LC Class: PS3554.O719 T67 2005
- Preceded by: Cadillac Beach
- Followed by: The Big Bamboo

Torpedo Juice is Tim Dorsey's seventh novel, published in 2005. As with Dorsey's previous works, the main character is amateur Florida historian and serial killer Serge A. Storms.

== Plot summary ==
The book takes place mainly in the Florida Keys, where Serge heads to "reinvent himself". After flirting with becoming the next Jimmy Buffett (undaunted by a total lack of musical talent), he finally decides to marry. All he has to do is find the right woman. Given Serge's personality (a mixture of bizarre topic-hopping as his attention drifts and his penchant for brutal honesty), this proves quite a challenge. And somehow, he's picked up a legion of devoted followers continually begging him for pearls of wisdom.

After briefly courting a few unwilling prospects, he falls in love at first sight with Molly, a new hire at the local library. She initially seems to be stereotypically meek and prim, but is won over when she inadvertently watches Serge beat a man to death for insulting her. She agrees to his hastily scheduled wedding (held during an underwater concert) and quickly proves to be more than a match for Serge's formidable libido. He is quickly baffled by the intricacies of a "normal" relationship, however, and his bride resents all the time he spends with his dim-bulb pal Coleman. Arguments and cold silences follow. With all of this frustration, Serge barely notices the brown Duster following him or the repeated attempts on his life.

Meanwhile, the regulars at the No Name Pub are vexed by Gaskin Fussels, an obnoxious rich loudmouth who flies down to the Keys every weekend to "whoop it up". They ignore him as best they can until Fussels, obliviously following a half-joking suggestion, steals and accidentally destroys a prized possession of the local viciously psychotic drug lord obsessed with the movie Scarface.

Simultaneously, downtrodden waitress Anna discovers that her abusive husband has been murdered, along with her brother and his wife. She flees for her life, trying to decide whom to trust and how to free herself from the trouble in which she suddenly finds herself. She finds an ally, and later a lover, in Jerry, the desperate-to-be-liked bartender at the No Name Pub.

Gus is a deputy in a small police station. Gus can't escape his mocking nickname of Serpico or the humiliations his ex-wife heaped on him, both of which his partner Walter is happy to mention. Suddenly the fax starts spitting out bulletins about possible serial killers headed their way and dangerous cars to be on the lookout for.

A slimy ex-CEO, recently tried for improprieties that robbed thousands of people of their retirement funds (in an apparent reference to the Enron scandal), decides to spread a little "goodwill" around the Keys. But he is obviously buying people's support before announcing his plans to obscure some of Florida's most beautiful shoreline with condominiums. Legally, he should have lost nearly all his wealth, but thanks to the quasi-legal dealings of his equally slimy lawyers, he is still spending other people's money and living the good life.

In the end, of course, very few people are who they seem and identities are unmasked as all the plot threads come crashing together. Molly is a serial killer even more deranged than Serge, Fussels is a fed investigating Jerry (who is actually "Scarface"), and Anna and Gus find themselves in possession of a solid gold boat anchor worth millions.

== Notes ==
Torpedo Juice marks the return of Seymour "Coleman" Bunsen, Serge's drug- and alcohol-abusing friend. Although Coleman was apparently killed in Florida Roadkill, he seems to be a favorite character of author Dorsey; he appeared in Triggerfish Twist (set in between chapters of Roadkill). The book's self-referential narrator, who sets the book as a production much like a motion picture or television show with actors portraying characters, claims that Coleman wanted out of the series before it hit big, then realized his mistake and begged for a return. The excuse for his reappearance is admittedly, although intentionally, weak; it was "a visiting friend" wearing Coleman's clothes who died in a vicious hail of gunfire during the events of Roadkill.
