= Bamboo (disambiguation) =

Bamboo is a group of woody plants in the true grass family Poaceae.

Bamboo may also refer to:

== Geography ==
- Bamboo, Jamaica, a village
- Bamboo, Queensland, a locality in Australia
- Bamboo Forest (Kyoto, Japan), also called the Arashiyama Bamboo Grove or Sagano Bamboo Forest
- Bamboo Key, a coral island in the Florida Keys National Marine Sanctuary
- Zhuzilin station (English translation: Bamboo Forest station), a station of Shenzhen Metro Line 1 in Futian District, Shenzhen, China

== People ==
- Bamboo (rapper), Kenya emcee
- Bamboo Mañalac (born 1976), Filipino singer and former band vocalist

== Arts, entertainment, and media ==
=== Films ===
- Bamboo (1945 film), Spanish comedy
- Bamboo (2023 film), an Indian Marathi-language drama film

=== Literature ===
- Bamboo (book), collection of non-fiction works by Scottish writer William Boyd

=== Music ===
==== Bands ====
- Bamboo (Australian band), a reggae band of the late 1970s-1980
- Bamboo (Filipino band), a former rock band fronted by Bamboo Mañalac, formed 2003
- Bamboo (British band), a musical duo formed in 2014
- Bamboo (production act), UK house music project

==== Other music ====
- Bamboo (album), 1996 album by Pierre Estève
- "Bamboo," a song by Dave Van Ronk from the 1961 album Van Ronk Sings
- "Bamboo", a song by Joe Satriani from the 2004 album Is There Love in Space?
- "Bamboo," a song by OutKast from the 2003 album Speakerboxxx/The Love Below

== Other uses ==
- Bamboo (elephant), Asian elephant
- Bamboo Airways, an airline in Vietnam
- Bamboo (software), continuous integration software from Atlassian
- Bamboo (unit), an obsolete unit of measurement

== See also ==
- Related to bamboo the plant:
  - Bamboo blossom
  - Bamboo processing machine
  - Bamboo torture
  - Bambuseae
  - International Network for Bamboo and Rattan
  - List of bamboo species
- Bamboo Club, a chain of nightclubs
- Bambu (disambiguation)
- Ceremonial pole
- Craft-Bamboo Racing, British motor racing team
- Lucky bamboo, Dracaena sanderiana, a species of flowering plant that is not actually bamboo
- Reynoutria japonica, sometimes called "false bamboo", "elephant-ear bamboo", "American bamboo", or "Mexican bamboo"
- The Bamboos (disambiguation)
- Wacom Bamboo, a graphic tablet produced by Wacom
