= Cedric Miller =

Cedric Miller may refer to:

- Ced-Gee (born 1963), American hip hop producer and rapper
- Cedric Miller (basketball) (born 1964), Bahamian-French basketball player
