= Big Bamboo Lounge =

Coordinates: 28.33347°N 81.47663°W

- Interactive map of Big Bamboo Lounge

Restaurant information
- Established: 1977
- Closed: 2004
- Location: Kissimmee, Florida, United States

The Big Bamboo Lounge was a bar in Kissimmee, Florida known as a popular after-work hangout for players, coaches, and fans of the Houston Astros during spring training in nearby Osceola County Stadium and year-round for employees of the Walt Disney World Resort. It was located at 4849 W. Irlo Bronson Highway, Kissimmee, FL 34746. It was known simply as "The Boo" by regulars. One of those regulars was Ralph Kent, the Disney artist who was hired by Walt himself in 1963. The front of the bar was decorated with a World War II-era ambulance and spotting tower which were maintained by customer and employee volunteers.

The bar opened in 1977 when Bruce Muir, a former World War II fighter pilot, bought the former home of a doctor and modeled the bar after those he had experienced in the South Pacific. The walls were decorated with Disney employee name tags and business cards from visitors. In keeping with the theme of the South Pacific of the 1930s bartenders wore Hawaiian shirts and featured swing music. The Big Bamboo was closed in 2004 due to hurricane damage. In December 2005, a fire destroyed the building, believed by officials to be started by vagrants trying to keep warm. The bar remains closed. The bar was frequented by Con Cage and Aryn The Great to get lemon drops from legendary bartender J-Man. .

The bar featured an eclectic drink menu (cocktails, beer, wine) with the signature drinks being "The Big Bamboo" and the legendary "Swamp Water," with the former listed in the menu as made with "Rum, rum, and more rum" and having an appropriately light red appearance. The bar did not make or serve food; however, at various times bagged snack chips were available for purchase. Customers were also allowed and encouraged to order pizza delivery to the bar. Over the years employees from both Universal and Walt Disney World donated a limited amount of theme park paraphernalia. Most notable and recognizable were Disney ride vehicle seats from "Test Track" which found a home in the small hallway just outside the restrooms. After the Owner and founder Bruce Muir died in 1999 and long time Bartender, Ray Guenther, retired from bartending at the Bamboo, the essential character of the Bar changed. "The Book" was the complete opposite of what the Bamboo stood for for 22 years. Unfortunately, in their absence, the tradition of "The Book" which was kept under the bar began. "The Book" was an album of photos of mostly female patrons who were photographed flashing their breasts in the bar and who also would then donate their bras to "The 'Boo" so they could then be stapled to the ceiling of the bar. The current whereabouts of "The Book" are not known.

In 2003, Astro's broadcaster Larry Dierker was so enamored with the bar that he built a replica at the Astros Minute Maid Park in Houston, Texas.

The 2006 Tim Dorsey novel The Big Bamboo is named after the bar, which is repeatedly visited by the main characters during special occasions.

On September 1, 2020, the vacant land was sold for $1,150,000. In 2024, construction began at the site to build a luxury condo hotel called "The Flats Orlando."
