= Hurricane Punch =

Novel by Tim Dorsey

- Author: Tim Dorsey
- Language: English
- Series: Serge A. Storms
- Genre: Crime novel
- Publisher: William Morrow (USA) & HarperCollins (UK)
- Publication date: 2007
- Publication place: United States
- Media type: Print (hardback)
- Pages: 368 pp (first edition, hardback)
- ISBN: 978-0-06-082967-4 (first edition, hardback)
- OCLC: 70230773
- Dewey Decimal: 813/.54 22
- LC Class: PS3554.O719 H87 2007
- Preceded by: The Big Bamboo
- Followed by: Atomic Lobster

Hurricane Punch is a novel by Tim Dorsey published in 2007. It follows overly zealous serial killer Serge A. Storms, who is tracking hurricanes all over Florida.

== Plot summary ==
Serge is in therapy, coping with the fact he has turned 44. At first he goes on a religious awakening, but then decides to make a comeback...by killing as many people as possible in unusual and disturbing ways. As he does this, hurricane season is in full force, and Serge follows hurricanes like others follow sporting events. Unfortunately for him, another serial killer calling himself "The Eye of the Storm" is following him, and trying to upstage him. The newly freed Agent Mahoney doesn't believe that the killings are the work of two serial killers, but that Serge's unstoppable zeal for life has caused him to snap in two. But that won't stop Serge, and his brain dead friend Coleman, from enjoying every minute of hurricanes A-I.

== Drink ==
Hurricane Punch is also a drink mentioned several times in the book, invented by Coleman, Serge's drug-addled companion. It is described in chapter Thirteen as Torpedo Juice (Red Bull and Everclear), mixed with "...cranberry juice, pineapple juice, light rum, dark rum, amaretto, blue curaçao, orange passion fruit, a wedge of lime, a leaf of mint, a squirt of triple sec, a splash of Grand Marnier, a dash of grenadine, a pinch of coconut, a sprinkle of sugar, shaved ice. Oh, and a whole bunch of mescaline."
