= Bambu =

Bambu may refer to:

== People ==
- Bambu (rapper)
- André Bambu (born 1979), Brazilian professional basketball player
- Robson Bambu (born 1997), Brazilian footballer

== Arts, entertainment, and media ==
- Bambú (film), a Spanish historical comedy film
- Bambu (album), the incomplete second album by Dennis Wilson
- "Bambú", a song by Miguel Bosé from Los chicos no lloran, 1990

== Other uses ==
- Bambu (restaurant), an American chain specializing in Vietnamese drinks
- Bambu (rolling papers), a brand of rolling papers for hand rolled cigarettes
- Bambu, Iran, a village in South Khorasan Province, Iran
- Bambu Lab, a 3D printing company
- Bambú (Madrid Metro), a station on Line 1

== See also ==
- "Bambú, Bambú", a 1939 song recorded by Carmen Miranda for the film Down Argentine Way
- Bamboo (disambiguation)
