= Matt Lojeski =

American-Belgian basketball player

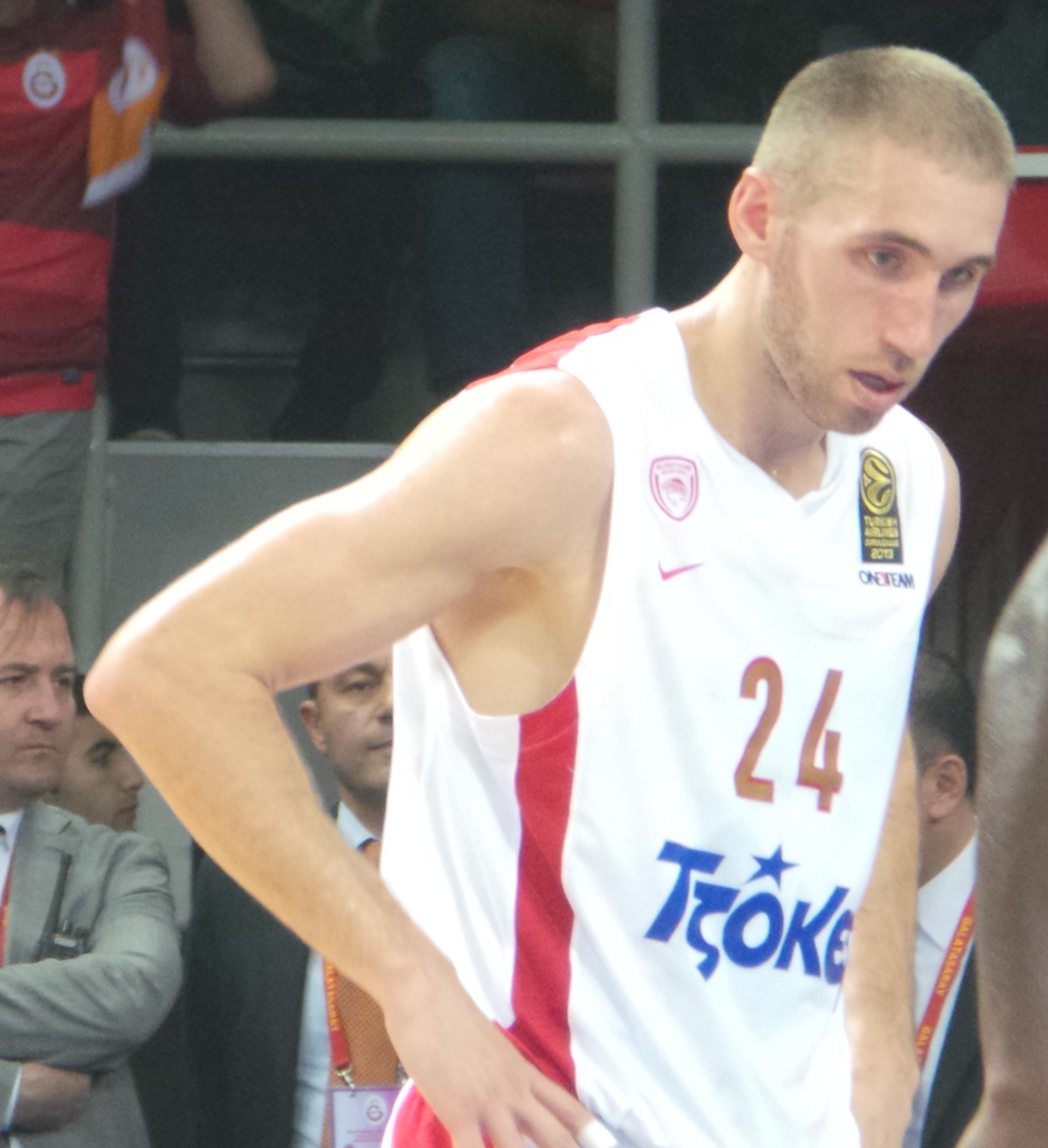
- Matt Lojeski

Personal information
- Born: July 24, 1985 (age 41) Racine, Wisconsin, U.S.
- Listed height: 6 ft 6 in (1.98 m)
- Listed weight: 203 lb (92 kg)

Career information
- High school: St. Catherine's (Racine, Wisconsin)
- College: Eastern Wyoming (2003–2005); Hawaii (2005–2007)
- NBA draft: 2007: undrafted
- Playing career: 2007–2021
- Position: Small forward / shooting guard
- Number: 24

Career history
- 2007–2009: Okapi Aalst
- 2009–2013: Oostende
- 2013–2017: Olympiacos
- 2017–2019: Panathinaikos
- 2019–2020: Tofaş
- 2020–2021: AEK Athens

Career highlights
- FIBA Intercontinental Cup champion (2013); 4× Greek League champion (2015, 2016, 2018, 2019); Greek Cup winner (2019); 2× Pro League champion (2012, 2013); 2× Belgian Cup winner (2010, 2013); 2× Pro League MVP (2009, 2013); Pro League Finals MVP (2013); 4× All-Pro League First Team (2010-2013); Belgian Cup MVP (2013)

Matthew Thomas Lojeski (born July 24, 1985) is an American-Belgian former professional basketball player who last played for AEK Athens of the Greek Basket League and the Basketball Champions League. He also represents the senior men's Belgian national basketball team. Standing at 6 ft 6 in (1.98 m), and weighing 92 kg (203 lbs.), he plays at the shooting guard and small forward positions.

== High school career ==
Lojeski played high school basketball at St. Catherine's High School in Racine, Wisconsin. While in high school, Lojeski played basketball, baseball, and soccer, and also competed in cross country sports. As a basketball player, he was named All-County and All-Conference twice, and All-State once. As a baseball player, he was named All-Conference twice.

== College career ==
Lojeski played college basketball at Eastern Wyoming College (NJCAA) from 2003 to 2005. At Eastern Wyoming, he was named to the NJCAA All-Tournament Team in 2004, and to the NJCAA All-American Third Team in 2005.

After being recruited by the Utah State Aggies and the DePaul Blue Demons, Lojeski ultimately decided to play at the University of Hawaii (NCAA Division I), where he played with the Hawaii Rainbow Warriors, from 2005 to 2007. While at Hawaii, he was selected to the Great Alaska Shootout's All-Tournament Team, and was named the Most Outstanding Player of the Rainbow Classic in 2006. He was also selected to the All-WAC Newcomer Team in 2006. He was named to the All-WAC Second Team in 2007.

== Professional career ==
Lojeski began his pro career in 2007, with the Belgian League club Okapi Aalst. While a member of the Aalst team, he was named the Belgian League MVP in 2009. He then moved to the Belgian League club Oostende.

With Oostende, he won the Belgian Cup in 2010 and 2013, and the Belgian League championship in 2012 and 2013. He was also named the Belgian Cup MVP in 2013, and the Belgian League MVP the same year.

On July 31, 2013, Lojeski signed a two-year contract with the back-to-back defending EuroLeague champions Olympiacos. On November 16, 2014, he extended his contract with Olympiacos until 2017. With Olympiacos, he won the 2013 edition of the FIBA Intercontinental Cup, and the Greek League championship in 2015 and 2016.

Lojeski has also played in the NBA Summer League, with the Summer League teams of the Utah Jazz and Milwaukee Bucks.

On August 12, 2017, Lojeski signed a one-year deal with Greek club Panathinaikos. In his very first year in Greens, he won the Greek Championship. In the 5th final (best-of-five-series) against Olympiakos, (84:70) Matt had 12 points, four rebounds and four assists. Lojeski renewed his contract with Panathinaikos for another season on July 28, 2018. On February 17, 2019, he won the Greek Cup title after Panathinaikos beat PAOK (79:73) in the big final, held in Heraklion, Crete. At the end of the season, Matt won another Championship with the Greens (3rd in a row and 38th trophy for Panathinaikos) having 8.7 points, 2.0 rebounds and 1.9 assists in 17.9 minutes per game. Panathinaikos beat Promitheas in the play-off final series with 3-0 victories.

On August 5, 2019, he signed with Tofaş of the Turkish Basketbol Süper Ligi.

On July 26, 2020, Lojeski agreed to return to Greece, this time for AEK Athens.

== National team career ==
Lojeski received Belgian nationality in May 2013, making him eligible to play for the senior men's Belgian national basketball team. After playing in the team's preparation stage in several friendly games, he was selected to play for Belgium at the EuroBasket 2013. However, he could not play at the tournament, due to an injury.

He made his debut in an official tournament with Belgium, at EuroBasket 2015. On September 7, 2015, during EuroBasket 2015, he hit a buzzer-beating tip-in against Lithuania, which gave Belgium a 76–74 win. Belgium ended the competition at the tournament's Round of 16, where they lost to Greece, by a score of 75–54. Over 6 EuroBasket 2015 tournament games, Lojeski averaged 11.7 points, 3.2 rebounds, and 2.8 assists per game, on 49.1% shooting from the field.

== Career statistics ==
Legend
GP	Games played	GS	Games started	MPG	Minutes per game
FG%	Field-goal percentage	3P%	3-point field-goal percentage	FT%	Free-throw percentage
RPG	Rebounds per game	APG	Assists per game	SPG	Steals per game
BPG	Blocks per game	PPG	Points per game	PIR	Performance index rating
**Bold**	Career high

=== EuroLeague ===
Year	Team	GP	GS	MPG	FG%	3P%	FT%	RPG	APG	SPG	BPG	PPG	PIR
2013–14	Olympiacos	**29**	13	**25.0**	**.518**	.430	.778	**4.0**	2.0	.6	.1	**11.1**	**12.6**
2014–15	Olympiacos	25	7	24.2	.489	.432	.625	3.8	1.6	**1.0**	**.3**	9.5	10.6
2015–16	Olympiacos	11	3	21.6	.506	.450	.813	3.5	**2.5**	.5	.1	10.1	12.0
2016–17	Olympiacos	26	2	21.4	.494	.420	.827	3.1	1.6	.5	**.3**	9.9	11.3
2017–18	Panathinaikos	27	**18**	18.3	.467	**.455**	.700	2.4	.7	.3	.1	5.7	4.6
2018–19	Panathinaikos	25	6	15.9	.517	.356	**.920**	2.2	.9	.2	.1	6.5	6.3
Career		143	49	22.1	.499	.426	.790	3.1	1.5	.5	.2	8.7	9.4

== Awards and accomplishments ==
=== College ===
- NJCAA All-Tournament Team: (2004)
- NJCAA All-American Third Team: (2005)
- Great Alaska Shootout All-Tournament Team: (2006)
- Rainbow Classic Most Outstanding Player: (2006)
- All-WAC Newcomer Team: (2006)
- All-WAC Second Team: (2007)

=== Pro career ===
- 2× Belgian League MVP: (2009, 2013)
- 2× Belgian Cup Winner: (2010, 2013)
- 2× Belgian League Champion: (2012, 2013)
- Belgian Cup MVP: (2013)
- FIBA Intercontinental Cup Champion: (2013)
- EuroLeague Finals Top Scorer: (2015)
- 4× Greek League Champion: (2015, 2016, 2018, 2019)
- Greek League Finals MVP: (2019)
