= Nuclear Jellyfish =

2009 novel by Tim Dorsey

- First edition
- Author: Tim Dorsey
- Language: English
- Genre: Crime novel
- Publisher: William Morrow (USA) & HarperCollins (UK)
- Publication date: 2009
- Publication place: United States
- Media type: Print (Hardback
- Pages: (first edition, hardback)
- ISBN: 978-0-06-143266-8
- OCLC: 232977583
- Preceded by: Atomic Lobster

Nuclear Jellyfish is the eleventh novel by American author Tim Dorsey. It was released February 1, 2009.

== Plot summary ==
Nuclear Jellyfish features Dorsey's character Serge A. Storms. A mentally-disturbed vigilante anti-hero, Storms travels across Florida with sidekick Coleman to mete out his own brand of justice to miscreants, scammers and criminals while seeking out landmarks related to iconic rock band Lynyrd Skynyrd. They are joined by a jaded yet driven and quirky stripper/college student named Story Long.

The novel finds Storms crossing paths with a brutal band of thieves and killers whose leader calls himself "The Eel"—but who behind his back is called "The Jellyfish" due a misshapen eel tattoo. In the meantime, Storms's nemesis Detective Mahoney complicates matters, it becomes increasingly hard to tell whether Serge is being manipulated into his most dangerous situation yet or is the manipulator himself, and a coin and stamp convention draws attention due to valuable collectibles.
