= Cadillac Beach =

2004 novel by Tim Dorsey

- Author: Tim Dorsey
- Language: English
- Genre: Crime novel
- Publisher: William Morrow
- Publication date: February 3, 2004
- Publication place: United States
- Media type: Print (hardback)
- Pages: 352 pp
- ISBN: 0-06-052046-9
- OCLC: 52410217
- Dewey Decimal: 813/.54 21
- LC Class: PS3554.O719 C34 2004
- Preceded by: The Stingray Shuffle
- Followed by: Torpedo Juice

Cadillac Beach is the sixth novel written by Tim Dorsey, published in 2004.

== Plot summary ==
The year is 1996. At long last, Serge A. Storms has been captured. He is committed to the psychiatric hospital at Chattahoochee, where he patiently tries to explain his views. Serge grows tired of this diversion, however, and escapes once more. His newest obsession involves investigating the circumstances surrounding his grandfather's death forty years earlier, when he allegedly committed suicide by wandering into the ocean at a Miami beach. Serge's grandfather, who passed on many of his habits and interests (as well as his mental instability) to his grandson, may have been involved with a lucrative jewel theft (the real life 1964 museum robbery committed by Jack Roland Murphy) shortly before his disappearance, however, so his friends are understandably reluctant to talk.

The novel then skips forward eight years and over the previous novels in the series to 2004, where Serge is living with his friend Lenny and Lenny's mother while planning a phantasmagoric array of projects, the biggest of which is still to solve the matter of his grandfather's supposed suicide. To finance his quest, Serge and Lenny start up a unique tour service highlighting the "lesser known" side of Florida's tourism industry. During one of his tours, a group of drunken convention attendees accidentally kidnap and kill a mob boss. The mobster in question just happens to be one that Serge personally insulted a few days earlier, incurring the wrath of both the mob and the FBI. Serge decides to keep close tabs on the salesmen for their own protection, not letting them leave his sight. Somehow, he also finds the time to publicly embarrass the Castro regime of Cuba and the United States government at the same time.

Tagging along in Serge's deathmarch/tour are Lenny, a newspaper columnist from New York City, a friend of Serge's grandfather's named Chi Chi, and City and Country, a pair of dim-witted women that Serge ditched at the beginning of The Stingray Shuffle, in 1998.
