= Arrieros de Antioquia =

- Leagues: Baloncesto Profesional Colombiano
- History: Paisas de Antioquia; 1996–2001; Arrieros de Antioquia; 2001–present
- Arena: Coliseo Iván de Bedout
- Capacity: 7,000
- Location: Medellín, Antioquia, Colombia

Arrieros de Antioquia is a Colombian basketball club from Medellín. Founded in 1993, the team plays in the Baloncesto Profesional Colombiano. The club has won four national championships, in 1993, 1996, 2001 and 2010.

The team played in the 2011 Liga Sudamericana de Básquetbol as "Orgullo Paisa".

== Honours ==
Baloncesto Profesional Colombiano

- Champions (4): 1993, 1996, 2001, 2010

== Players ==
=== Notable players ===
Note: Flags indicate national team eligibility at FIBA-sanctioned events. Players may hold other non-FIBA nationalities not displayed.

Criteria

To appear in this section a player must have either:

- Set a club record or won an individual award while at the club
- Played at least one official international match for their national team at any time
- Played at least one official NBA match at any time.

- (Venezuela) Heissler Guillent
- (The Bahamas) Cedric Miller
