= Esporte Clube Pinheiros (basketball) =

Pinheiros Basquete
- Nickname: Sport Club Germânia (S.C. Germânia)
- Leagues: NBB
- Founded: 7 September 1899; 125 years ago (multi-sports club); 1926; 99 years ago (basketball club)
- History: Sport Club Germânia (S.C. Germânia) (1926–1941); Esporte Clube Pinheiros (E.C.P) (1941–present)
- Arena: Ginásio Poliesportivo Henrique Villaboim
- Capacity: 1,000
- Location: São Paulo, Brazil
- Team colors: Blue and White
- President: Ivan Castaldi Filho
- Head coach: César Guidetti
- Championships: 1 FIBA Americas League
- Website: ecp.org.br
Home	Away

Esporte Clube Pinheiros, or Pinheiros Basquete, is a Brazilian professional basketball team that is based in São Paulo, Brazil. The club's name is commonly abbreviated as E.C. Pinheiros, or E.C.P. The full name of the club is Esporte Clube Pinheiros São Paulo (E.C.P.S.P.). It is a part of the multi-sports club, Esporte Clube Pinheiros (E.C.P.) which among other sports, fields a men's professional basketball team. The club was originally known as Sport Club Germânia (S.C. Germânia). The club plays in the top-tier level Brazilian League, the NBB.

== History ==
The club's parent athletic club, Esporte Clube Pinheiros, was founded in 1899, under the name Sport Club Germânia (S.C. Germânia). The club's name was changed to Esporte Clube Pinheiros (E.C.P), in 1941. In the 2005–06 season, E.C. Pinheiros participated for the first time in the professional first division of Brazilian basketball, but then failed to qualify for the single league that resulted from the merging of the conferences. In the 2008–09 season, Pinheiros joined the new top-tier level Brazilian league, the Novo Basquete Brasil (NBB), under the sponsored name, Pinheiros/Sky. The club finished 2nd in the FIBA South American League in 2011, and also finished 2nd in the InterLeagues Tournament in 2011 and 2012.

In 2013, the team won its first international tournament, the most important tournament of Latin America, the FIBA Americas League, with two victories against the host team, Capitanes de Arecibo, of the Puerto Rican League, and the Argentine League club CA Lanús. In the second round, Pinheiros also needed a Capitanes victory over the Brazilian League club, UniCEUB/BRB, the team that had eliminated Pinheiros in the two previous editions of the NBB. And it happened - the team from Puerto Rico, beat the defending three time Brazilian League champions, helping Pinheiros to win its first international title.

Pinheiros thus qualified to play at the 2013 edition of the FIBA Intercontinental Cup, against the defending back-to-back EuroLeague champions, Olympiacos. Pinheiros lost the series two games to none, losing the first game by a score of 81–70, and the second game by a score of 86–69.

== Arenas ==
E.C. Pinheiros plays its home games at the Ginásio Poliesportivo Henrique Villaboim, which is located on the club's home grounds, at Jardim Europa.

== Players ==
=== Current roster ===
Note: Flags indicate national team eligibility at FIBA-sanctioned events. Players may hold other non-FIBA nationalities not displayed.

E.C. Pinheiros roster
Players
Coaches

Pos.	No.	Nat.	Name	Ht.	Wt.	Age
PG	1	(Brazil)	Ribeiro, Adler	1.79 m (5 ft 10 in)	79 kg (174 lb)	24 – 8 July 2000
PG	2	(Brazil)	Campos, Gabriel	1.78 m (5 ft 10 in)	61 kg (134 lb)	23 – 11 April 2001
SG	3	(United States)	Bennett, Corderro	1.83 m (6 ft 0 in)	81 kg (179 lb)	36 – 29 March 1988
G	4	(Brazil)	Ruivo, Felipe	1.87 m (6 ft 2 in)	80 kg (176 lb)	27 – 16 February 1998
SF	5	(Brazil)	de Oliveira, Gabriel	2.02 m (6 ft 8 in)	95 kg (209 lb)	31 – 12 July 1993
SF	7	(Brazil)	Gonçalves, Isaac	1.92 m (6 ft 4 in)	96 kg (212 lb)	34 – 2 July 1990
G/F	9	(Brazil)	de Oliveira, Jonatan	1.88 m (6 ft 2 in)	78 kg (172 lb)	25 – 4 August 1999
PF	11	(Brazil)	Mamedes, João Victor	2.01 m (6 ft 7 in)	98 kg (216 lb)	27 – 5 January 1998
C	12	(Brazil)	de Souza, Daniel	2.12 m (6 ft 11 in)	103 kg (227 lb)	24 – 6 June 2000
C	13	(Brazil)	Toledo, Marcus Vinicius	2.02 m (6 ft 8 in)	106 kg (234 lb)	38 – 10 July 1986
PG	14	(United States)	Dawkins, Kenny	1.80 m (5 ft 11 in)	71 kg (157 lb)	37 – 23 July 1987
F/C	17	(Brazil)	Oliveira, Nicolas	2.03 m (6 ft 8 in)	106 kg (234 lb)	26 – 20 March 1999
C	20	(Brazil)	Melo, Lucas	2.03 m (6 ft 8 in)	99 kg (218 lb)	26 – 4 March 1999
F	21	(Brazil)	Leite, Luan	1.98 m (6 ft 6 in)	96 kg (212 lb)	23 – 26 September 2001
G/F	22	(Brazil)	Buffat, Jonas	1.91 m (6 ft 3 in)	81 kg (179 lb)	24 – 2 May 2000
SF	26	(Brazil)	Duarte, Betinho	1.95 m (6 ft 5 in)	95 kg (209 lb)	36 – 25 May 1988
SF	42	(Brazil)	dos Santos, Samuel	1.95 m (6 ft 5 in)	95 kg (209 lb)	25 – 24 November 1999
C	44	(Brazil)	Waldemar, Maicon	2.04 m (6 ft 8 in)	100 kg (220 lb)	24 – 9 November 2000
F	50	(United States)	Ware, Cristopher	2.00 m (6 ft 7 in)	109 kg (240 lb)	35 – 23 June 1989

Head coach

- (Brazil) César Guidetti

Assistant coach(es)

- (Brazil) Nelson Cortez

Legend

- (C) Team captain
- Injured

- Roster
Updated: 9 July 2019

== Titles and honors ==
=== Worldwide ===
- FIBA Intercontinental Cup
  - Runners-up (1): 2013

=== Latin America ===
- FIBA Americas League
  - Champions (1): 2013
  - Runners-up (1): 2014

=== Continental ===
- FIBA South American League
  - Runners-up (1): 2011
- InterLeagues Tournament
  - Runners-up (2): 2011, 2012

=== Regional ===
- São Paulo State Championship
  - Champions (1): 2011
  - Runners-up (2): 2010, 2012

== Notable players ==
Note: Flags indicate national team eligibility at FIBA-sanctioned events. Players may hold other non-FIBA nationalities not displayed.

Criteria

To appear in this section a player must have either:

- Set a club record or won an individual award while at the club
- Played at least one official international match for their national team at any time
- Played at least one official NBA match at any time.

- (Brazil) Rafael "Bábby" Araújo
- (Brazil) André Bambu
- (Brazil) Leandrinho Barbosa
- (Brazil) Vítor Benite
- (Brazil) Paulinho Boracini
- (Brazil) Bruno Caboclo
- (Brazil) Georginho de Paula
- (Brazil) Lucas Dias
- (Brazil) Shilton dos Santos
- (Brazil) Rolando Ferreira
- (Brazil) Alex Garcia
- (Brazil) Guilherme Giovannoni
- (Brazil) Ricardo Guimarães
- (Brazil) Marcelinho Huertas
- (Brazil) Rafa Mineiro
- (Brazil) Carlos Olivinha
- (Brazil) Diego Pinheiro
- (Brazil) Davi Rossetto
- (Brazil) Milton Setrini
- (Brazil) Humberto Silva
- (Brazil) Jonathan Tavernari
- (Brazil) Marcus Toledo
- (Brazil) Caio Torres
- (Brazil) Marquinhos Vieira
- (United States) / (Brazil) Shamell Stallworth
- (United States) Jamison Brewer
- (United States) Joe Troy Smith

== Head coaches ==
- (Brazil) Cláudio Mortari
- (Brazil) Marcel de Souza
