= Triggerfish Twist =

2002 novel by Tim Dorsey

- US edition
- Author: Tim Dorsey
- Language: English
- Genre: Crime novel
- Publisher: William Morrow (USA) & HarperCollins (UK)
- Publication date: 2002
- Publication place: United States
- Media type: Print (hardback & paperback)
- Pages: 372 pp
- ISBN: 0-06-103155-0
- Dewey Decimal: 813
- LC Class: PS3554.O719 T75
- Preceded by: Orange Crush
- Followed by: The Stingray Shuffle

Triggerfish Twist is a 2002 crime novel by Tim Dorsey, the fourth in his series featuring Serge A. Storms.

== Plot summary ==
Jim Davenport is transferred to his company's branch in Tampa, Florida. He and his wife Martha are initially excited by the move and the beauty of their new neighborhood on Triggerfish Lane, but the reality proves to be disturbing: the Davenports' neighbors are a strange bunch of eccentrics, and crime is much worse than they had thought. These neighbors eventually include brutal-but-charismatic criminal Serge Storms, spiteful cocaine-addicted stripper Sharon Rhodes, and drug addict Seymour "Coleman" Bunsen, who move into the rental home across from the Davenports after Sharon and Coleman's brainless antics accidentally burn down Serge's home.

Jim's troubles begin while he is waiting in a bank drive-through, when an armed robber mistakes Jim's Suburban for his getaway vehicle and jumps in, threatening Jim and his infant daughter with a gun. Jim manages to overpower the robber, breaking his neck when a faulty airbag inflates in his face. Jim does not know that the robber was the youngest of five brothers, and the remaining four are released from prison on a technicality and begin looking for revenge. FDLE Agent Mahoney, obsessed with capturing Serge, convinces his boss to let him travel to Tampa, ostensibly to warn Jim.

When Jim returns to work, his consulting employer is acquired by a different company, which alters its corporate policy to make Jim the primary scapegoat for corporate layoffs. Jim is unable to adjust to his new role and is eventually fired.

Serge, despite his criminal lifestyle, develops a great liking and admiration for Jim, even considering proposing marriage to Sharon to emulate Jim's success as a family man. Jim likes Serge as well, but Martha senses something strange about Serge and orders him to stay away.

At least three subplots intertwine with and lead up to the novel's climax:

- While browsing the library at the University of Tampa, Serge is mistaken for a professor, and his impromptu lectures on Florida history and culture become so popular among the student body that the Dean asks Serge to deliver the commencement address.
- John Milton, a substitute teacher turned bank teller turned car salesman, is fired from his last job and decides to take revenge on Jim, the person assigned official blame for his firing from the bank.
- Ambrose Tarrington III, a bankrupt former millionaire, lives in a small house on Triggerfish Lane, but mimics the attitude of wealth so well that he is constantly treated to test drives of luxury cars, free lunches from eager bank executives, and the use of mansions being offered for sale. Mistaking Ambrose's act for reality, Serge kidnaps him for ransom.

Events come to a head at the Davenports' Fourth of July costume party, which includes the four criminal McGraw brothers taking the party hostage and Serge and Mahoney reluctantly teaming up to save the guests. Jim, normally passive to a fault, is driven to defend his family by snatching a gun and shooting two of the brothers.

The novel ends with the principal characters being featured on an episode of the Bill Maher show, which Serge (on the run from the police and still pursuing the $5 million briefcase featured in Florida Roadkill) calls into, to express his sincere admiration for men with wives and children, declaring it a tougher job than anything Serge has had to cope with.

== Continuity ==
- The book takes place in the summer of 1997, somewhere in the midst of the events of Florida Roadkill; at the end of that novel, both Coleman and Sharon are dead.
- Several characters from Triggerfish Twist, including the Davenports, reappear in Atomic Lobster, taking place approximately ten years later. Sharon's sister and several McGraw cousins also appear in similar roles to their relatives from this book.
