= Dimitrios Katsivelis =

Greek basketball player (born 1991)

Dimitris Katsivelis Δημήτρης Κατσίβελης
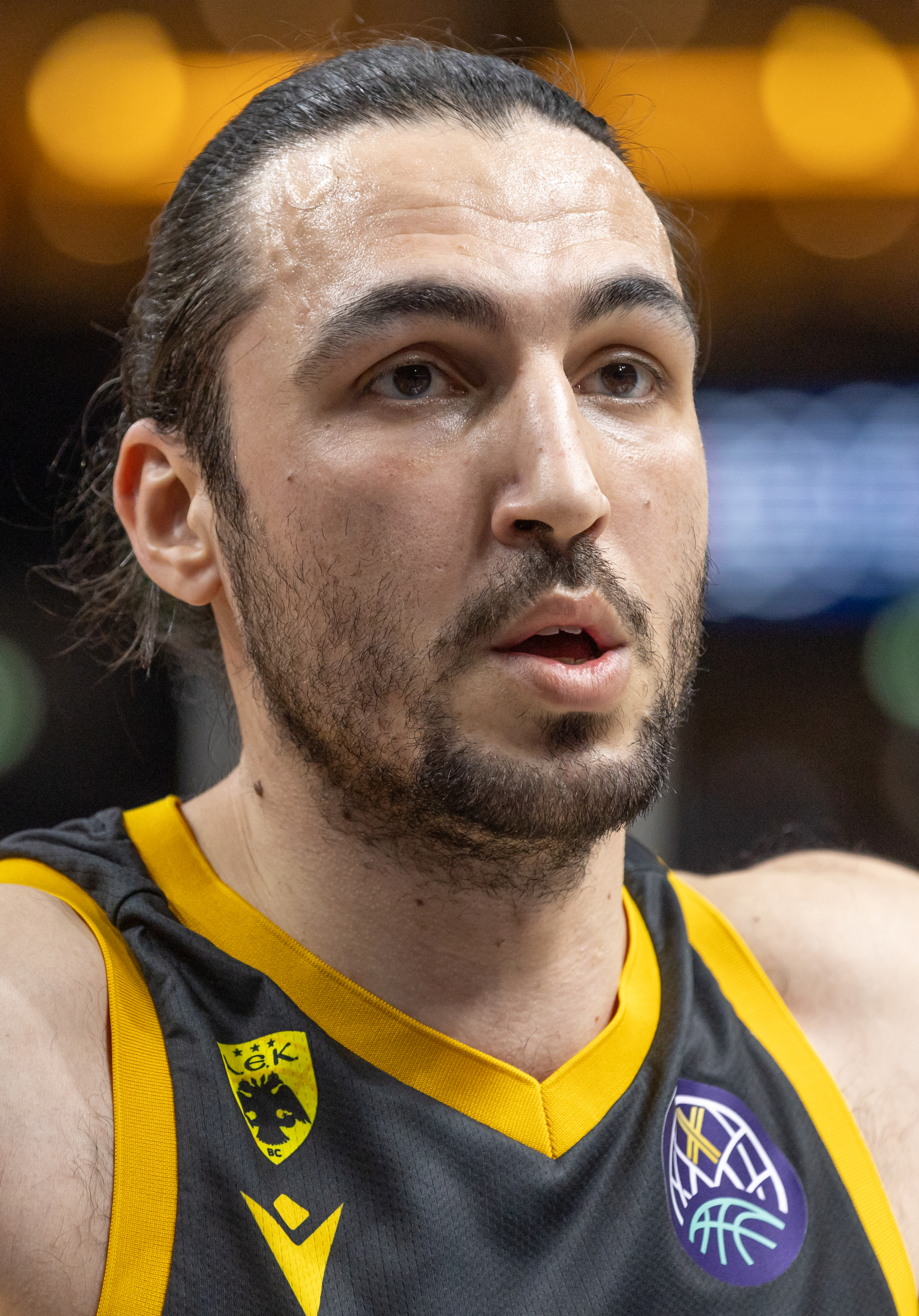
- Katsivelis with AEK Athens in March 2026.

No. 4 – AEK Athens
- Position: Point guard
- League: Greek Basketball League

Personal information
- Born: October 1, 1991 (age 35) Thessaloniki, Greece
- Listed height: 6 ft 6 in (1.98 m)
- Listed weight: 212 lb (96 kg)

Career information
- NBA draft: 2013: undrafted
- Playing career: 2010–present

Career history
- 2010–2015: Olympiacos
- 2015–2016: AEK Athens
- 2016–2017: Astana
- 2017–2018: PAOK Thessaloniki
- 2018–2020: Promitheas Patras
- 2020–2021: AEK Athens
- 2021–2022: Peristeri
- 2022–2023: Kolossos Rodou
- 2023–2024: Aris Thessaloniki
- 2024–2025: PAOK Thessaloniki
- 2025–present: AEK Athens

Career highlights
- FIBA Intercontinental Cup champion (2013); 2× EuroLeague champion (2012, 2013); 2× Greek League champion (2012, 2015); Kazakhstan League champion (2017); Kazakhstan Cup winner (2017); Greek League All-Star (2020)
Medals
Men's basketball
Representing Greece
EuroBasket
Bronze medal – third place	2025 Cyprus–Finland–Poland–Latvia
FIBA Europe Under-18 Championship
Gold medal – first place	2008 Greece	Under-18
FIBA Under-19 Basketball World Cup
Silver medal – second place	2009 New Zealand	Under-19
FIBA Europe Under-20 Championship
Silver medal – second place	2010 Croatia	Under-20

Dimitrios Katsivelis (alternate spelling: Dimitris) (Greek: Δημήτρης Κατσίβελης; born October 1, 1991) is a Greek professional basketball player for AEK Athens of the Greek Basketball League. He is a 1.98 m (6 ft 6 in) tall, 96 kg (212 lb) point guard.

== Professional career ==
Katsivelis started his career playing at the semi-professional level (the 3rd-tier level of Greek basketball) with Mantoulidis in the Greek B League.

He began his professional career when he signed with the Greek League club Olympiacos Piraeus in 2010. With Olympiacos, he won the EuroLeague and Greek League championships, in 2012. With Olympiacos, he also won the 2012–13 season championship of the EuroLeague, and the Greek League championship in 2015.

On August 5, 2015, he signed with AEK Athens. He moved to the Kazakh club Astana, of the VTB United League, for the 2016–17 season.

On July 1, 2018, Katsivelis was announced by Promitheas Patras, where he subsequently spent two seasons. He averaged 3.7 points, 2.2 rebounds and 1.1 assists per game in the shortened 2019-2020 campaign.

On August 8, 2020, he agreed to return to AEK.

On July 24, 2021, Katsivelis moved to Peristeri. On April 18, 2022, he was suspended for the rest of the season, along with teammate Linos Chrysikopoulos, after they both fell out of favor with the club's new head coach Milan Tomić. In 17 league games, he averaged 6.7 points, 2.1 rebounds and 3 assists per contest.

On August 25, 2022, Katsivelis signed with Kolossos Rodou, reuniting with both Chrysikopoulos and his Astana coach Ilias Papatheodorou. In 24 games, he averaged 7.6 points, 3.7 rebounds, 3.8 assists and 1.5 steals, playing around 26 minutes per contest.

On June 30, 2023, Katsivelis returned to Thessaloniki for Aris.

On June 28, 2024, Katsivelis returned to PAOK, and was named the team's captain.

On July 4, 2025, Katsivelis returned Athens for a third stint with AEK Athens, signing a two-year contract.

== National team career ==
=== Greek junior national team ===
With Greece's junior national teams, Katsivelis won the gold medal at the 2008 FIBA Europe Under-18 Championship, the silver medal at the 2009 FIBA Under-19 World Cup, and the silver medal at the 2010 FIBA Europe Under-20 Championship.

=== Greek senior national team ===
Katsivelis became a member of the senior men's Greek national basketball team in 2017. He played at the 2019 FIBA World Cup qualification.

== Awards and accomplishments ==
=== Pro career ===
- 2× EuroLeague Champion: (2012, 2013)
- 2× Greek League Champion: (2012, 2015)
- FIBA Intercontinental Cup Champion: (2013)
- Kazakhstan League: Champion (2017)
- Kazakhstan Cup: Winner (2017)
- Greek League All-Star :(2020)

== Career statistics ==
Legend
GP	Games played	GS	Games started	MPG	Minutes per game
FG%	Field-goal percentage	3P%	3-point field-goal percentage	FT%	Free-throw percentage
RPG	Rebounds per game	APG	Assists per game	SPG	Steals per game
BPG	Blocks per game	PPG	Points per game	PIR	Performance index rating
**Bold**	Career high

=== EuroLeague ===
†	Denotes seasons in which Katsivelis won the EuroLeague

Year	Team	GP	GS	MPG	FG%	3P%	FT%	RPG	APG	SPG	BPG	PPG	PIR
2010–11	Olympiacos	2	0	9.0	**.667**	.500	**1.000**	**1.0**	**1.5**	—	—	**3.5**	**4.0**
2011–12†	Olympiacos	7	**4**	**16.3**	.368	.286	**1.000**	**1.0**	1.0	**.6**	**.1**	2.4	1.0
2012–13†	Olympiacos	10	1	6.6	.333	.500	.500	.7	.4	.1	—	0.7	0.2
2013–14	Olympiacos	**15**	1	4.6	.385	**.571**	.500	.4	.5	.1	**.1**	1.0	0.9
2014–15	Olympiacos	12	1	6.3	.455	.333	.000	.8	.3	.2	**.1**	1.0	0.8
Career		46	7	7.5	.404	.423	.500	.7	.6	.2	.1	1.3	0.9

=== Greek junior national team ===
- 2008 FIBA Europe Under-18 Championship: Gold
- 2009 FIBA Under-19 World Cup: Silver
- 2010 FIBA Europe Under-20 Championship: Silver
