= The Bamboos =

The Bamboos may refer to:

- The Bamboos (rock band), 1980s alternative rock band from Perth, Australia
- The Bamboos (funk band), 2000s deep funk band from Melbourne, Australia
- Bamboo (Filipino band), 2000s alternative rock band from Manila, Philippines

== See also ==
- Bamboo (disambiguation)
