= Orange Crush (novel) =

2001 novel by Tim Dorsey

- The cover of the US edition of Orange Crush
- Author: Tim Dorsey
- Language: English
- Genre: Crime novel
- Publisher: William Morrow
- Publication date: July 2001
- Publication place: United States
- Media type: Print (Hardback & Paperback)
- Pages: 292 pp
- ISBN: 0-06-018577-5
- OCLC: 45700678
- Dewey Decimal: 813/.54 21
- LC Class: PS3554.O719 O73 2001
- Preceded by: Hammerhead Ranch Motel
- Followed by: Triggerfish Twist

Orange Crush is Tim Dorsey's third novel, and the first not to star Serge A. Storms as the main character. It is a frequently dark spoof of the politics of Florida and the United States' involvement in the Balkans.

== Explanation of the title ==
The "Orange Crush" is the name given to the second-hand motorhome purchased by the main character, since it is painted bright orange and was previously used in a short-lived advertising campaign for the soft drink.

== Plot summary ==
Marlon Conrad, a "spoiled rich kid", enters the political arena in a career carefully managed by his wealthy father. He becomes the lieutenant governor of Florida, a plush job he can exploit mercilessly. When the elected governor dies in a plane crash, Marlon automatically assumes the office. At the outset of his tenure, Marlon is apathetic and corrupt, riding in the pockets of special interest groups. However, he is suddenly recruited into active duty during the Kosovo War and a bureaucratic tangle prevents him from ducking his responsibility as expected. His experiences in the military change his outlook, his fundamental character, and even his political views. He returns to Florida, determined to make a difference in the state. But first, Marlon faces a reelection battle against dim-witted Democratic candidate Gomer Tatum, the state House Speaker.

Alternating between manic attentiveness to his official duties and depressed apathy, Marlon eventually becomes disgusted with the inertia of politics in Tallahassee and purchases a second-hand motorhome. Marlon's Chief of Staff, Gottfried Escrow, converts Marlon's road trip into an impromptu campaign tour. Hijinks ensue as Tatum, egged on by his hyper-ambitious fiancée, Jackie, follows Marlon's trail around Florida, doing their best to outshine or sabotage Marlon's popularity.

Along the way, Escrow is alarmed to discover that Marlon's Press Secretary, Jack Pimento, is actually notorious criminal Serge A. Storms, suffering from amnesia; Escrow tries various schemes to have Serge arrested or removed from the campaign without risking public exposure. At the same time, Detective Mahoney, an agent of the FDLE, becomes obsessed with capturing Serge.

Marlon's newfound candor and lack of fealty to Florida's "fat cats" leads to several attempts to assassinate him, several of which are stopped by Jack/Serge. His change of heart also wins over Elizabeth Sinclair, a former aide at the public relations firm owned by Marlon's father's best friend. She and Marlon fall in love, and a potentially messy break-up with Marlon's fiancée, Babs Belvedere, is averted when she ends up falling for Jack/Serge instead.

On election night, Serge regains his memory and tackles Marlon's last would-be assassin. She was a young Latin American woman who escaped to the U.S., and found the men who had gang-raped and tortured her, living well in South Florida under false identities supplied by the CIA (one of several callous acts that Marlon rubber-stamped before his reformation). Serge convinces her to direct her wrath at Frank Lloyd Sirocco, a convicted murderer scheduled for execution. Sirocco faked evidence of his innocence, won a last-minute exoneration from Marlon, then called to rub his guilt in the governor's face.

Marlon loses the election to Tatum by a slim margin, and concedes defeat, departing Tallahassee with Elizabeth. Escrow's efforts, on Marlon's behalf, end with him being arrested with illicit heroin and bags full of stolen ballots. In the epilogue, Marlon and Elizabeth marry, and continue to tour the country in the motorhome, holding jobs as guest political commentators on CNN. A few months later, a documentary on the campaign wins Best Documentary at the Academy Awards; watching the ceremony on television, Detective Mahoney sees Serge mount the stage to accept the award, and takes off after him once more.
