= Atomic Lobster =

2008 novel by Tim Dorsey

- First edition (US)
- Author: Tim Dorsey
- Language: English
- Genre: Crime novel
- Publisher: William Morrow (USA) & HarperCollins (UK)
- Publication date: 2008
- Publication place: United States
- Media type: Print
- ISBN: 978-0-06-082970-4
- OCLC: 232977161
- Preceded by: Hurricane Punch
- Followed by: Nuclear Jellyfish

Atomic Lobster is the tenth novel by Tim Dorsey. It was released in 2008. It follows overly zealous serial killer Serge A. Storms.

== Plot summary ==
A chance encounter leads to the traveling duo of Serge and Coleman picking up a third member, a drug-addicted stripper named Rachael who reminds them of their late associate Sharon, and the dysfunctional group becomes involved in house-sitting, collecting soil and paint samples from the homes of famous artists, Serge hijacking support group meetings, and a reunion with Serge and Coleman's old neighbors Jim and Martha Davenport. A mid-life crisis, their daughter's engagement to a vacuous rich man, shady movers, support group snafus, and their own justified wariness of Serge all weigh on the Davenports, but Serge may also be their only salvation against the vengeful cousins of some criminals Serge and Jim killed in the third book. At the same time, misadventures aboard a nearby cruise ship camouflage a murderous smuggling ring that is taking advantage of the ship and becomes serious enough for the U.S. government to call out the accomplished and mysterious Agent Foxtrot to stop the threat just in time for Serge and Jim's adventures to become entangled with the ship. But the more obvious threats of Tex [=McGraw=] and the smugglers are not the only thing Serge and Coleman have to watch out for after it turns out that Rachael is Sharon's sister and is far from forgiving after finally learning of their role in Sharon's demise.
