= Big Bambú (artwork) =

Work of installation art

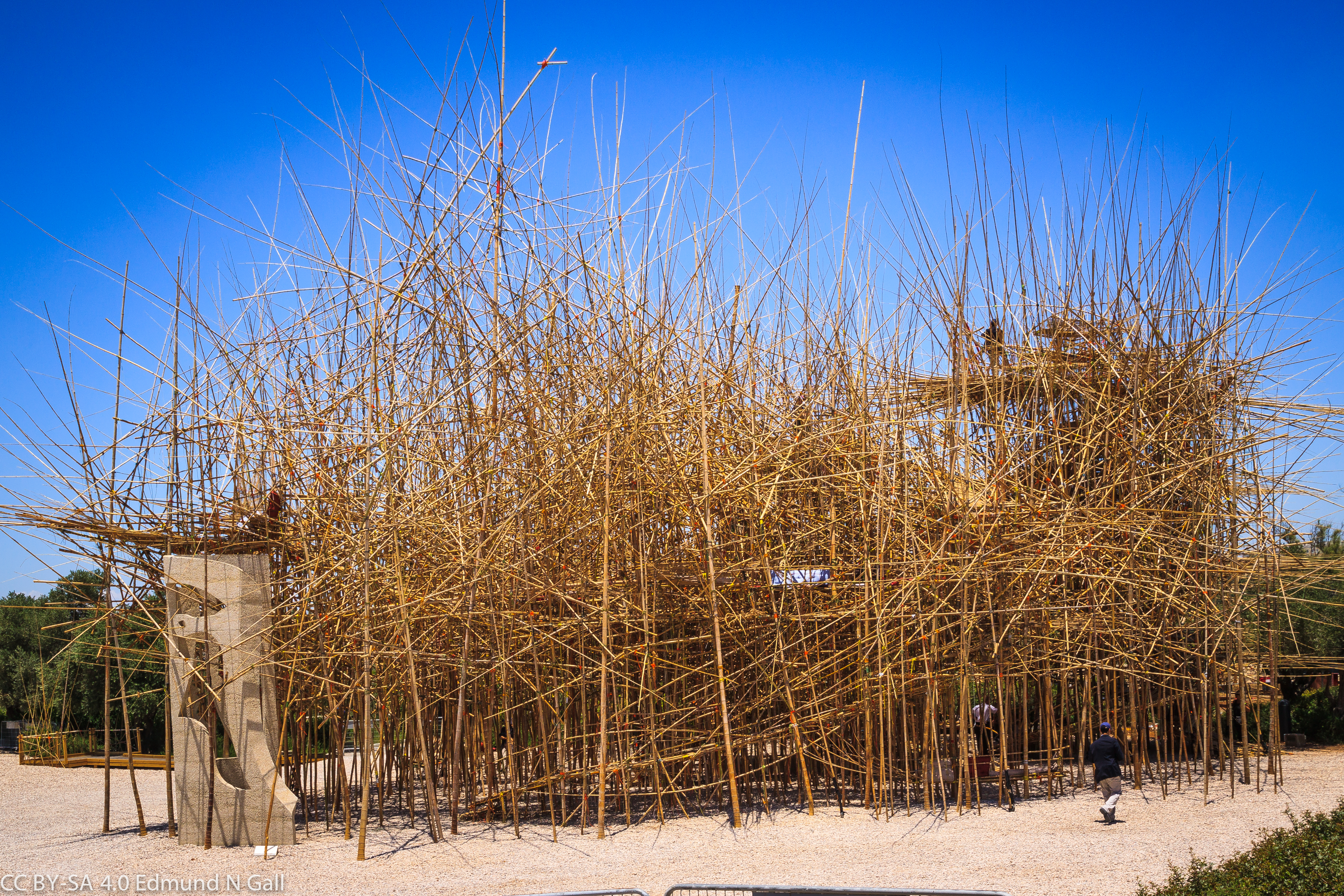
- Artist: Doug and Mike Starn
- Year: 2014
- Type: Installation art

Big Bambú is a work of installation art by identical twin artists Doug and Mike Starn. Variations on the Big Bambu theme have been constructed at several locations around the world. Combining architecture and sculpture, it examines the tension between chaos and order in nature.

== History ==
Big Bambú had its first installation in the artists' studio in Beacon, New York. From April to October 2010 it was the featured exhibition at the Metropolitan Museum of Art Roof Garden. In 2011 another incarnation of Big Bambú was installed as a collateral exhibition of the 54th Biennale in Venice, Italy. In 2013, it was installed on the Japanese island of Teshima during the Setouchi Triennale art festival. In 2014, it was presented in the Israel Museum, Jerusalem.

Big Bambú is made of thousands of bamboo poles, lashed together to form a complex structure through which visitors walk on elevated bamboo paths even as a crew continues to build a new part of the structure.

The name is taken from the Cheech & Chong album Big Bambu

In the original installation in the artists studio in Beacon, New York, Big Bambú is in continual motion as a crew disassembles one end and continues to build the other end. The piece was reconfigured into a gothic letter "T" to be photographed for the cover of the fifth anniversary edition of The New York Times style magazine.

== Metropolitan Museum installation ==
The installation on the roof of the Metropolitan Museum of Art was conceived as a giant wave cresting over the rooftop. Art critic Karen Wilkin wrote that the experience of walking on the roof terrace under the sculpture felt like "wandering through a bamboo grove." She described the piece as not a "significant sculpture... it's more of a phenomenon. But it's a delightful addition to the Met for the next six months—a temporary, ecologically correct folly designed to entertain."

Big Bambú is built of several types of bamboo, primarily a Japanese type called Madake, and also thin Meyeri bamboo and thick moso bamboo. All of the bamboo was grown in Georgia and South Carolina. The construction was undertaken by the artists working together with a team of twenty qualified rock climbers. Construction continued throughout the exhibition's six-month run, with the sculpture ultimately reaching 100 feet long, 50 feet wide, 50 feet high and using 3,200 bamboo poles. Museum visitors were required to wear rubber-soled, close-toed shoes to climb through the structure. Visitors could walk underneath the sculpture without obtaining a ticket and with no restriction on footwear.

== Israel Museum installation ==
Big Bambu: 5000 arms to hold you, constructed in the sculpture garden of the Israel Museum in Jerusalem in 2014, is 16 meters (52.5 feet) high and covers an area of over 700 square meters (7,500 square feet). Visitors are invited to climb on the framework of 10,000 bamboo poles bound by rope, which forms a labyrinth of winding paths and offers panoramic views of the Jerusalem cityscape.

== Ordrupgård Museum, Denmark ==
In 2018 a Big Bambú installation was made at Ordrupgård Museum in Denmark.

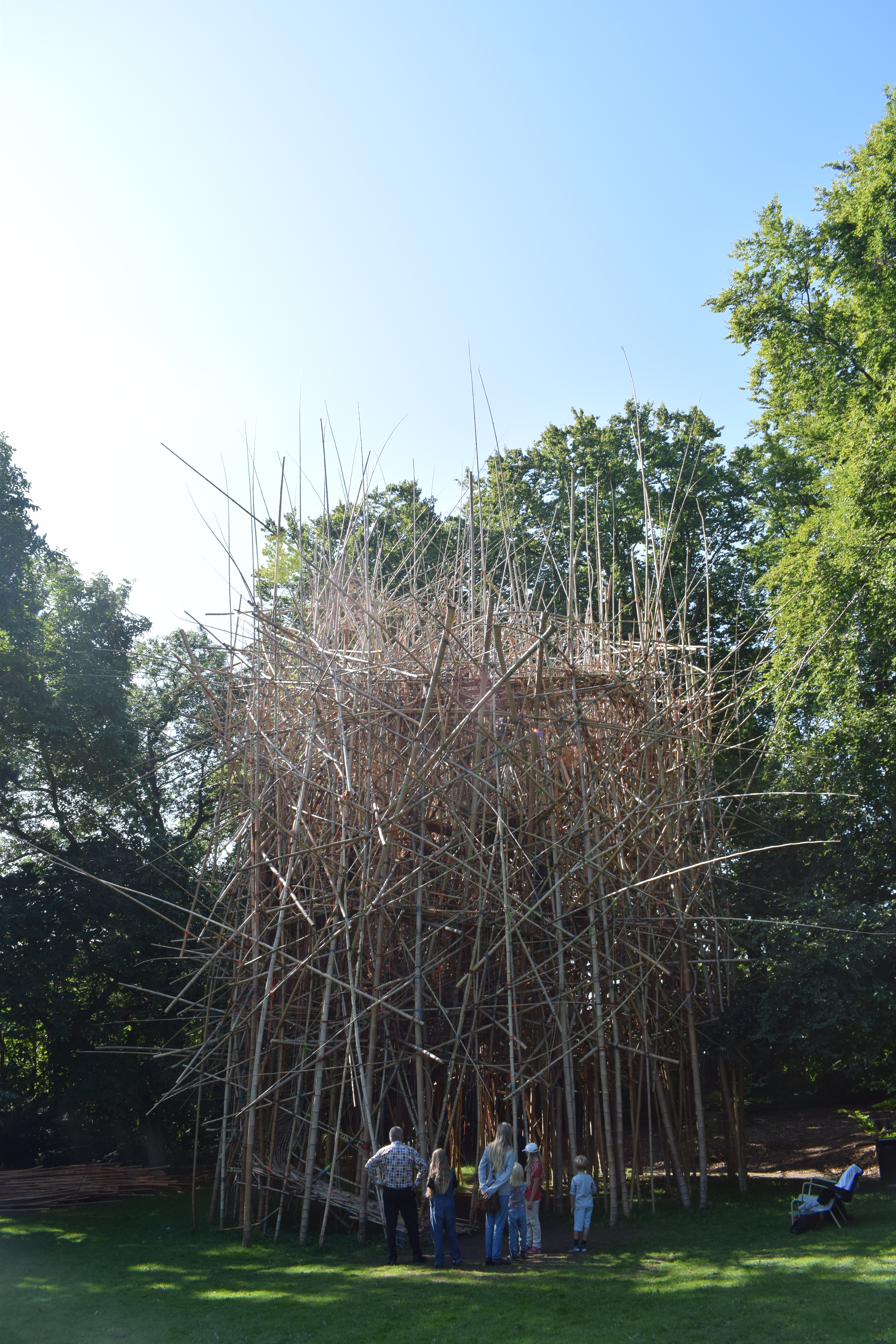
Doug & Mike Starn Big Bambú at Ordrupgård in Denmark

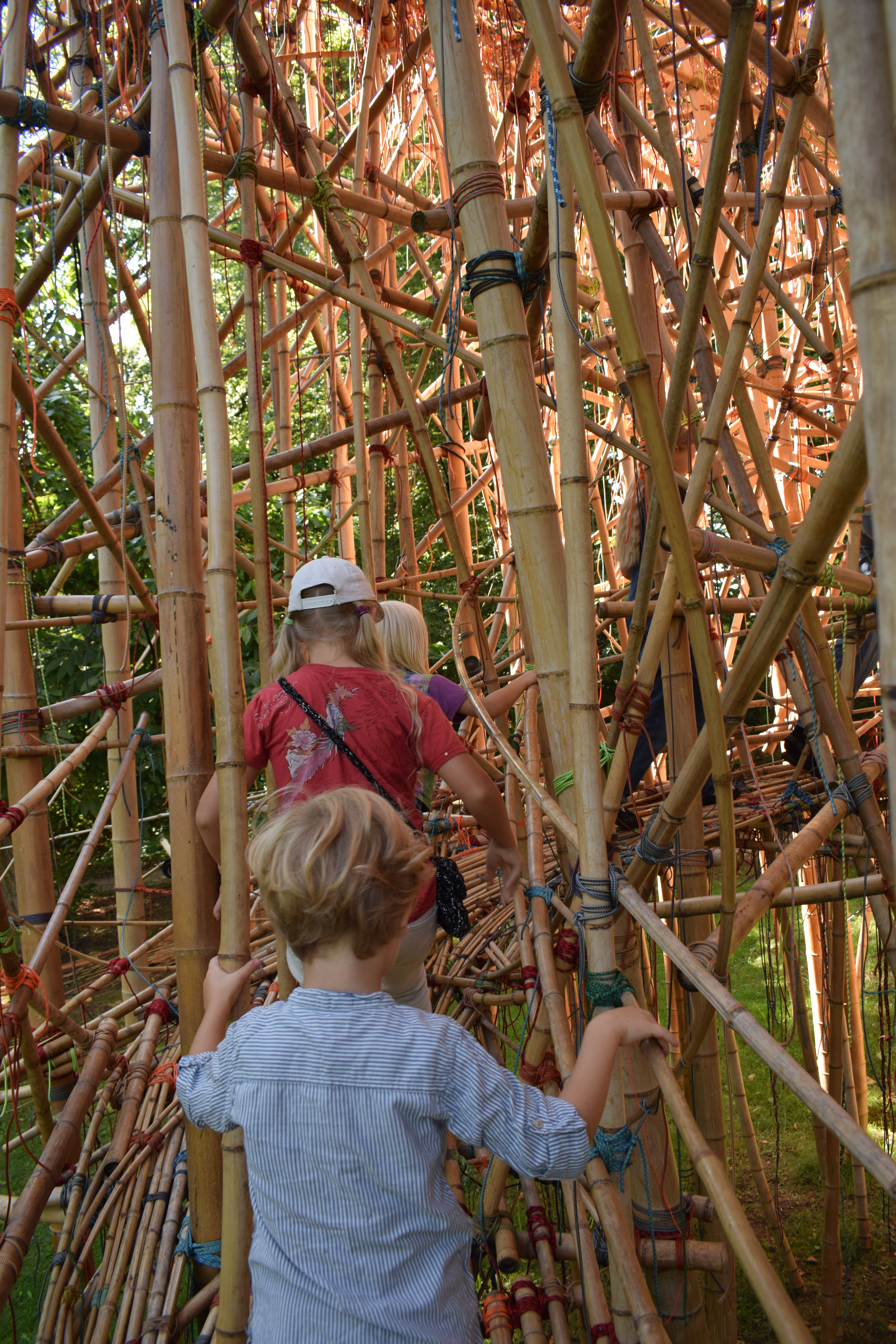
Walk up in a Big Bambú

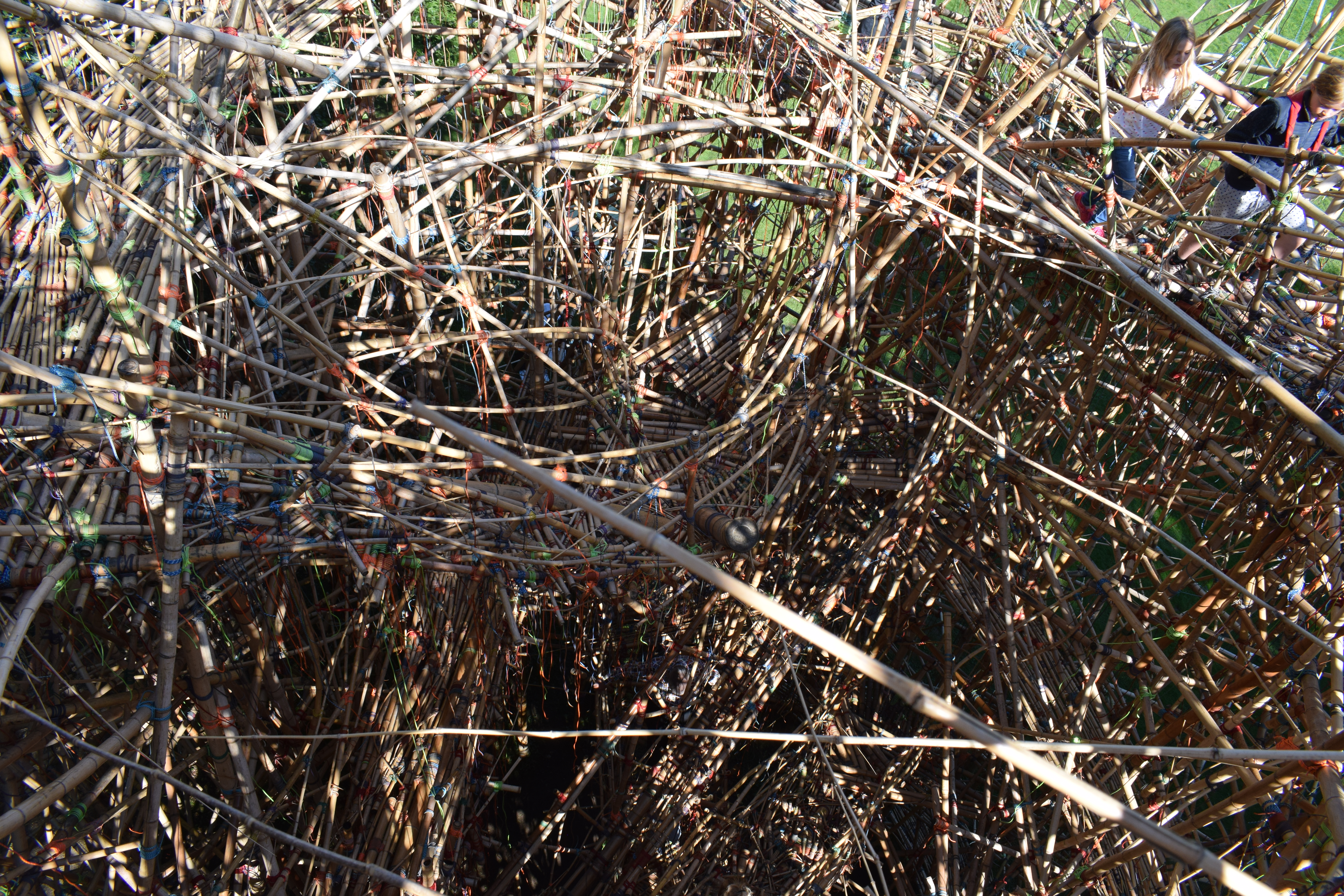
Close up of Doug & Mike Starn Big Bambú.
