= Caio da Silveira =

Brazilian basketball player

Personal information
- Born: 3 May 1966 (age 58); Leme, Brazil

Caio César Franco da Silveira, commonly known as Caio Silveira (born 3 May 1966) is a Brazilian former professional basketball player.

== National team career ==
With the senior Brazilian national basketball team, da Silveira competed at the 1996 Summer Olympics.
