= Bamboo processing machine =

Bamboo processing machines are used to prepare bamboo for use in manufacture of handicrafts, furniture and other products.

== Bamboo processing tasks ==
Bamboo processing machines are usually built to perform a single task such as:

- Splitting - separating the material in the direction of the fibers at right angles to the surface (radially)
- Slicing - separating the material in the direction of the fibers parallel to the surface (tangentially)
- Knot removing - cutting or grinding down the inter-segmental nodes.
- Planing - smoothing the top, bottom and/or side surfaces of a split length
- Cross cutting - cutting a length of stem into shorter sections
- Incense stick making
- Stick sizing
- Polishing
- Curving

== Multi-task processing machines ==
A new machine developed in Nagaland, India performs four tasks on a single platform – planing, curving, polishing and knot removing. It was recognized by the National Innovation Foundation – India in their fifth biennial competition.
