= Cedric Miller (basketball) =

American basketball player

Personal information
- Born: August 8, 1964 (age 62) Nassau, Bahamas
- Listed height: 2.11 m (6 ft 11 in)
- Listed weight: 103 kg (227 lb)

Career information
- College: Hampton (1980–1984)
- NBA draft: 1984: undrafted
- Playing career: 1984–2010
- Position: Power forward / center
- Number: 4, 14

Career history
- 1984–: Atenas de Córdoba
- Sangalhos DC
- 1988–1989: Rotterdam
- 1989–1991: Berck
- 1991–1993: Poissy-Chatou
- 1993–1994: CO Briochin
- 1994–1995: Caen
- 1995–1996: CO Briochin
- 1996–1997: ESPE Châlons-en-Champagne
- 1997–2000: Cholet
- 2000–2004: BCM Gravelines-Dunkerque
- 2004–2006: SOMB
- 2006: Arrieros de Antioquia
- 2006–2010: SOMB

Career highlights
- DBL top scorer (1989); 2x French Cup champion (1998, 1999)
- Stats at Basketball Reference

Cedric Miller (born August 8, 1964) is a Bahamian-French retired basketball player. He was a naturalized French citizen and played many years in France for several clubs. He also played in Argentina, Portugal and Colombia.

== Honours ==
Cholet

- French Cup (2): 1998, 1999

Rotterdam

- DBL Top Scorer: 1988–89
