= Hammerhead Ranch Motel =

2000 novel by Tim Dorsey

- US First edition cover
- Author: Tim Dorsey
- Language: English
- Series: Serge A. Storms
- Genre: Crime novel
- Publisher: William Morrow (US) & HarperCollins (UK)
- Publication date: 2000
- Publication place: United States
- Media type: Print (hardback & paperback)
- Pages: 354
- Dewey Decimal: 813.54
- LC Class: PS3554.O719 H36
- Preceded by: Florida Roadkill
- Followed by: Orange Crush

Hammerhead Ranch Motel is a novel by Tim Dorsey published in 2000. It continues the story, started in Florida Roadkill, of blithe psychopath Serge A. Storms and his pursuit of five million dollars in cash hidden in the trunk of a car. The book is non-linear, with some scenes occurring at the same time chronologically but told out of order with later scenes.

One set of characters is a group of commissioners from Lausanne, Switzerland, lured to Tampa as part of the city's real-life (and historically unsuccessful) bid to host the 2012 Summer Olympics.

== Plot summary ==
Like the previous novel, Hammerhead Ranch Motel begins in media res, with two murders and one apparent suicide, the events leading up to which are eventually explored in the remainder of the novel.

Serge A. Storms succeeds in tracking down the car with the briefcase containing $5 million in the trunk, and steals it while its drivers, Sean and David, have gotten out of the car to watch the progress of a wildfire. Later, he checks into the Hammerhead Ranch Motel in Tampa Bay to lie low, but his car is stolen by a trio of car thieves. The Motel's owner is a gangster named Zargoza (who legally changed his name from Harvey Fiddlebottom). Over the next few days, the briefcase changes hands several times, from the car thieves to the petty criminals who overheard the thieves bragging about finding it, to a pair of hapless college students hired by the thieves to drive their car across the state, to Zargoza's sometime-partners, the reckless Diaz Boys, and finally Zargoza himself.

Several of these handlers are tracked down and killed, either by Serge or the Diaz Boys, but only Serge follows the trail to Zargoza. After determining that the briefcase is no longer in the trunk of the car, Serge drives it to the top of the Sunshine Skyway Bridge, torches it with a Molotov cocktail, then leaps from the bridge with a parachute and dressed in a Santa Claus outfit (the act mistakenly seen as a suicide in the prologue). On the same night, one of the college students plunges to his death after being interrogated by the Diaz Boys, onto the glass roof of the Florida Aquarium.

The gruesome nature of the recent deaths drives Zargoza nearly insane from paranoia, and he changes the hiding place of the briefcase several times. Deciding that a more subtle approach is required with Zargoza, Serge partners with a Don Johnson-impersonator named Lenny Lipowicz, who owns a real Moon rock from a 1970s space mission. The two befriend Zargoza and the trio spend several weeks touring Florida tourist attractions, with Serge waiting for Zargoza to let slip where the briefcase is.

Three subplots intersect with the main story and lead up to the novel's climax:

- City and Country, two young women from Alabama, are on the run after a girl accidentally stabbed herself to death in their presence, with the steak knife she was snorting cocaine from. Believing themselves suspect in the woman's death, City and Country steal her car and flee to Florida, where they meet Serge and Lenny, quickly becoming addicted to Lenny's pot and Serge's bottomless supply of Florida history and trivia.
- Aristotle "Art" Tweed is falsely diagnosed with a terminal illness (a practical joke by the bored teenage daughter of an employee at his local hospital) and, after meeting a Hemingway impersonator named Jethro Maddox, decides to redeem himself by killing the worst bully he can find. At first he targets "Boris the Hateful Piece of Sh**", a Tampa shock jock leading the public outcry in favor of Florida's newest anti-immigration legislation, but Serge kills Boris first after the latter's lewd advances against City and Country. Meanwhile, the hospital's insurer hires a private investigator named Paul to track down Art and inform him about the hoax.
- The crew of an Air Force C-130 Hercules based at Keesler Air Force Base tracks the development and progress of Hurricane Rolando-berto in the Gulf of Mexico. The Air Force's attempt to liaise with the local media goes disastrously wrong when anchorman Blaine Crease, riding in the plane over the hurricane's eye, insists on pitching a cylindrical weather sensor out of an open hatchway while being filmed, which causes his network's beloved mascot, "Toto the Dancing Weatherdog" to leap after the "stick" and out the hatchway to plummet to his death.

When the hurricane unexpectedly changes direction and makes landfall at Tampa, all the characters are trapped inside the Hammerhead Ranch Motel. Zargoza's "fall guy", a washed-up rock musician named C.C. Flag, believing that he's about to be arrested for his complicity in Zargoza's crimes, takes a young boy hostage, but Art saves the boy and both Flag and the local community's xenophobic mayor, Malcolm Kefauver, are blown out to sea by the hurricane. Serge and Zargoza finally confront each other over the money, but Zargoza is distracted when Jethro, whose participation in "The Flying Hemingway"'s skydiving stunt left him stranded in a tree, crashes through the Motel's roof. Country protects Serge by shooting Zargoza, who dies before Serge can convince him to confess where the money is hidden. Art learns the truth from Paul and is befriended by the attractive single mother of the boy whose life he saved.

Watching the post-hurricane news, Serge sees the briefcase in the possession of Paul, leaving Tampa with Jethro, who happened to witness (from his tree perch) Zargoza hiding the briefcase for the last time. Serge frees Lenny from a local chain gang and, with City and Country in tow, takes off after the money once again.

== Reception ==
Oline H. Cogdill of the South Florida Sun Sentinel wrote Dorsey "embues" the novel "with the same wry humor, outlandish characters and raw-edged situations that were the driving force of his highly entertaining 1999 debut, Florida Roadkill." Jack Batten of the Toronto Star called it "funny and entertaining" in spite of how it "contains not a hint of a plot in its entire length." Paul A. Bergin of the Tampa Bay Times opined that while Dorsey "exhibits both a prodigious talent for dialogue and a delightful sense of the absurd", the novel is "lacking" in the "sense that any new ground is being broken."
