= Torpedo juice =

Alcoholic drink made from torpedo fuel

Torpedo juice is American slang for an alcoholic beverage, first mixed in World War II, made from pineapple, grapefruit or orange juice and the 180-proof (90% alcohol by volume) grain alcohol fuel used in United States Navy torpedo motors. Various poisonous additives were mixed into the fuel alcohol by Navy authorities to render the alcohol undrinkable, and various methods were employed by the U.S. sailors to separate the alcohol from the poison. Aside from the expected alcohol intoxication and subsequent hangover, the effects of drinking torpedo juice sometimes included mild or severe reactions to the poison.

In the first part of the Pacific War, U.S. torpedoes were powered by a miniature steam engine burning 180- or higher-proof ethyl alcohol as fuel. The ethyl alcohol was denatured by the addition of 5–10% "pink lady", a blend of dye, methanol and possibly other ingredients. Methanol causes blindness when ingested, and cannot be made non-poisonous.

Later, a small amount of Croton oil was added to the neutral grain spirits which powered U.S. torpedoes. Drinking alcohol with the oil additive caused painful cramps, internal bleeding and a violent emptying of the bowels. It was intended as a replacement for methanol which had caused blindness in some sailors. To avoid the Croton oil, sailors devised crude stills to slowly separate the alcohol from the poison, as alcohol evaporated at a lower temperature than Croton oil. The stills were sometimes called 'Gilly' stills, and the resulting potable alcohol was known as 'gilly' or gilly juice.

With the introduction of the electric powered U.S. Mark 18 torpedo, ethyl alcohol was no longer required for torpedoes; however, limited quantities of denatured alcohol were (and are) still required by the Electrician's Mates and Interior Communications Electricians on board ship for the purpose of cleaning slip rings, commutators, and carbon brushes on a wide variety of equipment.

The standard recipe for torpedo juice is two parts ethyl alcohol and three parts pineapple juice.

== See also ==
- C-4 (explosive) § Vietnam War; reputed to be an intoxicant, it actually caused acute illness. As a result, soldiers would chew it to get out of front-line duty.
