= Jonathan Tavernari =

Brazilian-Italian professional basketball player

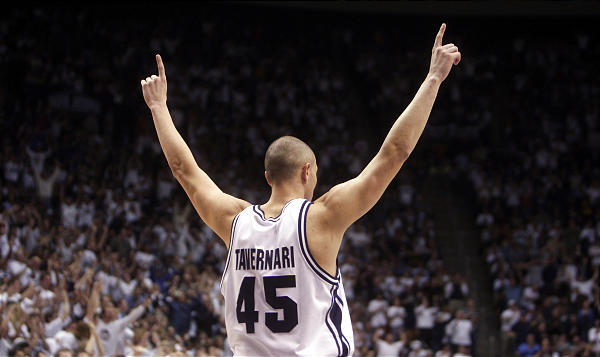
- Tavernari at BYU in 2007

Personal information
- Born: June 18, 1987 (age 39) São Bernardo do Campo, Brazil
- Listed height: 6 ft 6 in (1.98 m)
- Listed weight: 255 lb (116 kg)

Career information
- High school: Bishop Gorman (Las Vegas, Nevada)
- College: BYU (2006–2010)
- NBA draft: 2010: undrafted
- Playing career: 2010–2019

Career history
- 2010–2011: Pinheiros
- 2011–2012: Biella
- 2012: →Pistoia
- 2012–2013: Scafati
- 2013–2014: Pinheiros
- 2014–2015: Derthona Basket
- 2015–2016: Agropoli
- 2016-2017: Mens Sana Siena
- 2017–2018: Dinamo Sassari
- 2018: Pallacanestro Cantù
- 2018-2019: Scafati
Medals
Men's basketball
Representing Brazil
FIBA AmeriCup
Gold medal – first place	2009 San Juan
FIBA South American Championship
Gold medal – first place	2010 Neiva

Jonathan Tavernari (born June 18, 1987) is a former professional basketball player from São Bernardo do Campo.

== Early years ==
Tavernari started playing basketball with his mother, Thelma, as a 6-year-old boy in Sao Bernardo. He played with older teams, first being inserted in organized basketball at the age of 9, playing with 13 years old boys, impressing right away. At 11, he played with 12 years old kids, and became the MVP of the state of São Paulo. Age 12, he became the MVP of the South American continent. After his Under 14 season, achieving yearly regional and state championships, Jonathan played 2 years for the renowned club Esporte Clube Pinheiros, leading them to back-to-back undefeated regional and state championships, amassing a 61–0 record. At 15, he was selected to play with the Brazilian National Team, and 16, became the Team Captain, ending the South American Tournament U16 in 2003 losing to Venezuela, featuring NBA player Greivis Vasquez. After that year, he transferred to the US to continue his education and career.

== High school ==
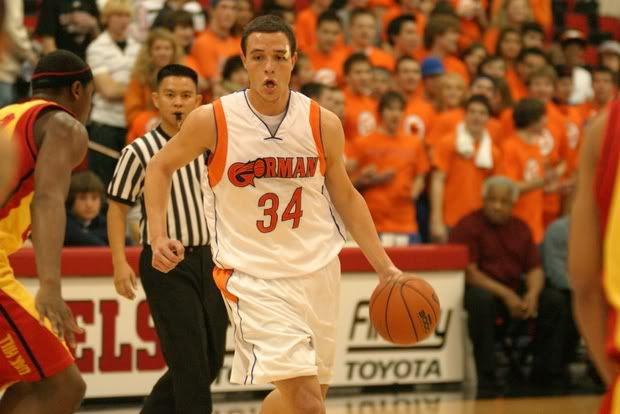
Tavernari in action vs. Oak Hill Academy

Tavernari attended Bishop Gorman High School in Nevada. He averaged a state-high 23.1 points per game and 10.2 rebounds per game, leading the Gaels to a 25–2 record, reaching the State Final Four. That season featured Tavernari being nominated to the McDonald's All-American team, as well as the Full-Court and Pangos All-American Teams. He led Gorman to a national ranking of 17th, with wins over many perennial powerhouses such as Mater Dei and Bishop O'Connell. Up to that point, Tavernari was considered to be the top high schooler to ever come out of Brazil. He committed to Brigham Young University out of high school, despite over a dozen offers from schools like UCLA, Florida, Washington State, Virginia Tech and Pitt.

== College career ==
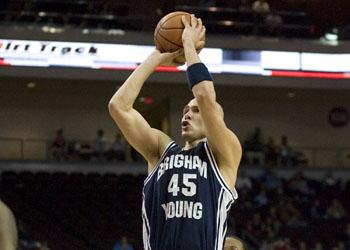
JT vs. Louisville in 2007

As a freshman for the Cougars, he was named Mountain West Conference Freshman of the Year while averaging 6.5 points and 2.9 rebounds per game for the regular season conference-champion Cougars. He was named to the All-MWC Third Team in both his sophomore and junior seasons, while setting program records on both years for three points made. He was named team captain for the 2008-2009 and 2009-2010 seasons. During his senior year, Tavernari opted to become the team's 6th man, helping the Cougars climb into the Top 10. As an "luxurious reserve", he became one of the country's top 6th man, earning praises from ESPN's Jay Bilas, and becoming Mountain West Conference 6th Man of the Year. Tavernari is one of the few players in MWC history to earn two of its individual awards (Freshman & 6th Man honors). He is the first player in BYU history to win the 6th Man of The Year award. Tavernari finished his tenure at BYU as the winningest player in school history, tapping 105 wins, setting school records in games played (132), three-pointers made, (262), being in the top 15 in points and top 10 in steals and rebounds. During his 4-year tenure in Provo, Jonathan led the Cougars to 4 consecutive Top 25 finishes, including a then-best 10th ranking in over 20 years. JT is one of the all-time greats at BYU, winning back-to-back-to-back MWC championships in 2007, 2008 and 2009.

Tavernari is the most decorated Brazilian basketball player in NCAA history, both in team and individual stats, such as wins, championships won and NCAA Tournament participation, points scored, three-point shots made and steals.

== Professional career ==
After graduating from BYU, Tavernari signed a 3-year deal contract with Pallacanestro Biella. During his first season, 2010-2011, he did not play, due to transfer issues. At the end of the season, Jonathan received his Italian Citizenship, due to his father's heritage. In the 2011-2012 season, Tavernari started the season with Biella, playing well in the preseason games, and appearing a few times in the Italian League, Serie A. In January, Pistoia Basket 2000 acquired Jonathan in a loan from Biella for the remainder of the season. On his debut for Pistoia, Jonathan had a brilliant start, going for 16 points and helping the Tuscan team to a home win against LegaDue's Imola. From January to May, Pistoia and Jonathan were neck to neck with Reggio Emilia to win the coveted promotion prize to the first division. Pistoia came up short, and had to try to win the second guaranteed spot through the playoffs. Pistoia lost to Brindisi in the finals, despite Jonathan's incredible performances in the playoffs against Veroli and Scafati. The head coach for Brindisi, Piero Bucchi, mentioned after the game that Jonathan was the best 6th man in the league, and for sure would be part of his All-League Team. Tavernari was selected as the 2012 6th Man of The Year for the Italian League. In July 2012, Tavernari signed a 1+1 year-deal with Scafati. In June 2013, JT signed a one-year deal with Esporte Clube Pinheiros, a professional team in São Paulo, Brazil, and the club he grew up playing for. Pinheiros participated in the São Paulo League, the Novo Basquete Brasil, FIBA Americas League, and the World Cup for Clubs against Olympiacos, coming in 2nd place. In July 2014, he then moved back to Europe, to play for Derthona Basket. For the 2015-2016 season, Tavernari remained in Italy, signing with Agropoli. There he led the newly promoted team to the second best record of the season, being one of the three main players along with Marc Trasolini and Terrence Roderick Jr. The Dolphins were poised for a long post season run, when Tavernari fractured his right foot and missed the remainder of the season. Following his year in Agropoli, JT signed with perennial European contenders Mens Sana Siena. On July 6, 2018, Tavernari signed a 1-year contract with Lega Basket Serie A (LBA) powerhouse Dinamo Basket Sassari. After strong performances and a great positive presence within the locker room, Dinamo extended Jonathan's contract until 2020.

On July 17, 2018, Tavernari left Sassari after one year and signed with the Italian club Pallacanestro Cantù.

Midway through the 2018-2019 season, Tavernari forced a trade from Cantù back to Scafati, due to financial problems from the Brianzolo team. Jonathan finished the season with a 20 points performance going 6–11 from long range. He averaged 40% from behind the arc that season.

== National team career ==
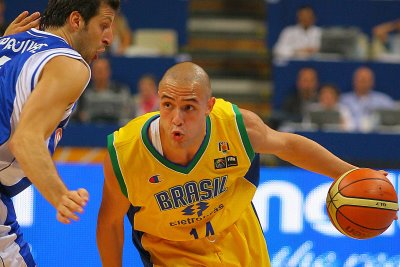
Tavernari Pré-Olímpico 2008 x Grécia.

Tavernari is also a member of the Brazilian national basketball team. He made his debut for the team at the 2008 FIBA World Olympic Qualifying Tournament for Men. He was also a member of the Brazil team that won the gold medal at the 2009 FIBA Americas Championship. Tavernari saw action in four games off the bench for the Brazilians, scoring nine points each in victories over Mexico and Uruguay. During the summer of 2010, Tavernari helped Brazil win gold at the South American Championships in Neiva, Colombia. While averaging a team second-best 11 points, Tavernari led the team in shooting percentage at 60%. That is, to this day, the last South American Championship won by Brazil.

== Off the court ==
Jonathan, and his wife Kiri, do extensive volunteer work with refugees around the world. They constantly do service projects collecting food, clothes, toys and personal hygiene kits for those arriving in Utah and Italy. As an outspoken Latter-day Saint, Tavernari often speaks publicly about his faith and life experiences. After basketball, JT worked for ESPN, ESPN Radio and BYUtv until the COVID-19 pandemic halted the 2019-2020 college basketball season. That led Tavernari to become involved with tech companies and started his journey as a businessman, leading startups in global RevOps.

In 2022, Tavernari started a youth basketball team called Utah Magic, coaching boys from the 2031 graduating class. The Magic has significantly improved over the years, and starting Fall 2025, they will be a member of the Adidas Jr. 3SSB Traveling Circuit.

== Personal life ==
Tavernari is the son of a basketball coaching legend (his mother Thelma), and of a sports administrative figure (father Roberto). He is a member of The Church of Jesus Christ of Latter-day Saints, being baptized on July 16, 2005. On September 9, 2009, he married Kiri Anne, his college sweetheart, in Salt Lake City, Utah. In 2012, Jonathan and Kiri gave birth to their son, Xander. In 2020, the couple welcomed their second son, Zion. On February 21, 2023, Jonathan officially became a United States citizen.
