= Tim Dorsey =

American novelist (1961–2023)

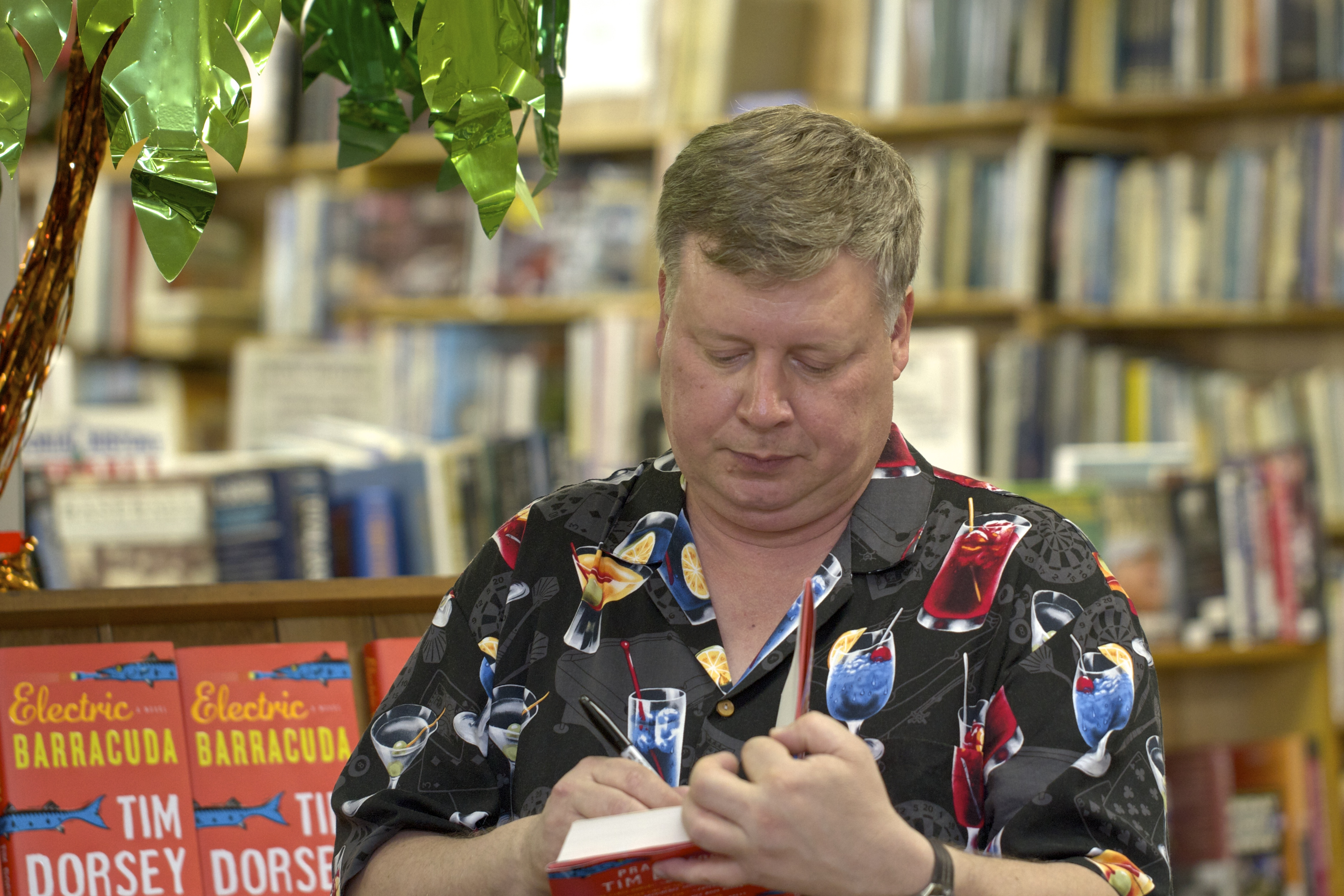
- Dorsey at a book signing at Haslam's Book Store in 2011
- Born: Timothy Alan Dorsey; January 25, 1961; Carmel, Indiana, U.S.
- Died: November 26, 2023 (aged 62); Islamorada, Florida, U.S.
- Education: Bishop Guertin High School; Auburn University
- Occupation: Novelist
- Children: 2
- Website: www.timdorsey.com

Timothy Alan Dorsey (January 25, 1961 – November 26, 2023) was an American novelist. He is known for a series starring Serge A. Storms, a mentally disturbed vigilante antihero who rampages across Florida enforcing his own moral code against a variety of low-life criminals.

== Biography ==
Tim Dorsey was born in Carmel, Indiana, and was taken to Florida by his mother at the age of 1. He grew up in Riviera Beach, a small town in Palm Beach County just north of West Palm Beach. Dorsey graduated from Bishop Guertin High School in Nashua, N.H., in 1979.

Dorsey attended Auburn University, where he became the editor of The Auburn Plainsman, the student newspaper; he wrote about racism while at Auburn. Dorsey graduated in 1983 with a Bachelor's degree in Transportation. After graduation, he moved to Montgomery, Alabama, and served as a police reporter for a local newspaper. In 1987, Dorsey relocated to Tampa, Florida, and became a reporter for The Tampa Tribune. Until he resigned from the paper in 1999 to write full-time, he worked variously as political reporter, correspondent in the Tribune's Tallahassee bureau, copy desk editor, and, finally, night metro editor and news coordinator.

Dorsey lived in Tampa with his wife and two daughters and was a Tampa Bay Rays fan. He also still considered himself a Boston Red Sox fan, cultivated while attending high school in New Hampshire as a teen.

Dorsey died in Islamorada, Florida, on November 26, 2023, at the age of 62.

== Serge Storms ==
Most of Dorsey's novels feature Serge A. Storms as the primary character. The character has several coexisting mental illnesses that render him obsessive, psychopathic, schizophrenic, and frequently homicidal, but Storms serves as the anti-hero in Dorsey's works due to his strong sense of moral absolutism and justice. Serge is intelligent, and frequently devises wildly inventive ways of condemning villains (or at least who he perceives as such) to death. His co-pilot in the majority of his adventures is Coleman, whose personality is the exact opposite of Serge. Whereas Serge is a high-strung straight-edged coffee addict, Coleman is an alcoholic drug user who goes to extreme lengths to maintain his buzz.

== Novels by Tim Dorsey ==
| Order of Publication | Order in Chronology | Title | Publication | ISBN |
|---|---|---|---|---|
| 1 | 2 | Florida Roadkill | 1999 | ISBN 978-0-06-113922-2 |
| 2 | 3 | Hammerhead Ranch Motel | 2000 | ISBN 978-0-380-73234-0 |
| 3 | 5 | Orange Crush | 2001 | ISBN 978-0-06-103154-0 |
| 4 | 1 | Triggerfish Twist | 2002 | ISBN 978-0-06-103155-7 |
| 5 | 4 | The Stingray Shuffle | 2003 | ISBN 978-0-06-055693-8 |
| 6 | 6 | Cadillac Beach | 2004 | ISBN 978-0-06-055694-5 |
| 7 | 7 | Torpedo Juice | 2005 | ISBN 978-0-06-058561-7 |
| 8 | 8 | The Big Bamboo | 2006 | ISBN 978-0-06-058563-1 |
| 9 | 9 | Hurricane Punch | 2007 | ISBN 978-0-06-082967-4 |
| 10 | 10 | Atomic Lobster | 2008 | ISBN 978-0-06-082969-8 |
| 11 | 11 | Nuclear Jellyfish | 2009 | ISBN 978-0-06-143266-8 |
| 12 | 12 | Gator A-Go-Go | 2010 | ISBN 978-0-06-143271-2 |
| 13 | 13 | Electric Barracuda | 2011 | ISBN 978-0-06-187689-9 |
| 14 | 14 | When Elves Attack | 2011 | ISBN 978-0-06-209284-7 |
| 15 | 15 | Pineapple Grenade | 2012 | ISBN 978-0-06-187690-5 |
| 16 | 16 | The Riptide Ultra-Glide | 2013 | ISBN 978-0-06-209278-6 |
| 17 | 17 | Tiger Shrimp Tango | 2014 | ISBN 978-0-06-209281-6 |
| 18 | 18 | Shark Skin Suite | 2015 | ISBN 978-0-06-224001-9 |
| 19 | 19 | Coconut Cowboy | January 26, 2016 | ISBN 978-0-06-224004-0 |
| 20 | 20 | Clownfish Blues | January 24, 2017 | ISBN 978-0-06-242922-3 |
| 21 | 21 | The Pope of Palm Beach | January 30, 2018 | ISBN 978-0-06-242926-1 |
| 22 | 22 | No Sunscreen for the Dead | January 15, 2019 | ISBN 978-0062795885 |
| 23 | 23 | Naked Came the Florida Man | January 7, 2020 | ISBN 978-0062796004 |
| 24 | 24 | Tropic of Stupid | January 26, 2021 | ISBN 978-0062967503 |
| 25 | 25 | Mermaid Confidential | January 25, 2022 | ISBN 978-0062967534 |
| 26 | 26 | The Maltese Iguana | February 28, 2023 | ISBN 978-0063240629 |

== Short stories and Essay collections by Tim Dorsey ==
- Florida Roadkill: A Survival Guide (2010)
- Squall Lines: Selected articles & essays (2012) ISBN 978-1-47-925806-2
- Tropical Warning: An Original Serge Storms Story and Other Debris (2013)
