= Bamboo (1945 film) =

- Directed by: José Luis Sáenz de Heredia
- Written by: Joaquín Goyanes; Adolfo Torrado
- Starring: Imperio Argentina
- Cinematography: Michel Kelber
- Edited by: Sara Ontañón
- Music by: Ernesto Halffter
- Production company: Suevia Films
- Release date: 15 October 1945
- Running time: 98 minutes
- Country: Spain
- Language: Spanish

Bamboo (Spanish: Bambú) is a 1945 Spanish historical comedy film directed by José Luis Sáenz de Heredia and starring Imperio Argentina. It is set in 1898 during the Cuban War of Independence.

== Cast ==
- Gabriel Algara
- Manuel Arbó
- Imperio Argentina
- Fernando Fernán Gómez
- Fernando Fernández de Córdoba
- Félix Fernandez
- Emilio García Ruiz
- José María Lado
- Julia Lajos
- Mary Lamar
- Sara Montiel
- Nicolás D. Perchicot
- Luis Peña
- Alberto Romea
- María Vicent

== Bibliography ==
- Bentley, Bernard. A Companion to Spanish Cinema. Boydell & Brewer 2008.
- Mira, Alberto. Historical Dictionary of Spanish Cinema. Scarecrow Press, 2010.
