= André Bambu =

Brazilian basketball player

Medal record

Men's basketball

Representing Brazil

FIBA South American Championship
Gold medal – first place	2003 Montevideo	
Silver medal – second place	2004 Rio de Janeiro	
Gold medal – first place	2006 Caracas	

André Luiz Quirino Pereira, commonly known as "André Bambu" (born 4 August 1979), is a Brazilian former professional basketball player.

== Professional career ==
Bambu played pro club basketball with Pinheiros in the top-tier Brazilian League. With Pinheiros, he won the FIBA Americas League's 2013 season championship.

== National team career ==
Bambu was a member of the senior men's Brazilian national basketball team. With Brazil, he played at the 2006 FIBA World Championship.
