= Paulinho Boracini =

Brazilian-Italian basketball player

Bauru
- Position: Point guard
- League: Novo Basquete Brasil

Personal information
- Born: December 26, 1984 (age 41) Mogi das Cruzes, São Paulo
- Listed height: 6 ft 0 in (1.83 m)
- Listed weight: 180 lb (82 kg)

Career information
- Playing career: 2001–present

Career history
- 2001–2003: Mogi
- 2003–2005: Corinthians Paulista
- 2005: Beijing Ducks
- 2005: Clube Espéria
- 2005–2006: Pitágoras
- 2006–2007: AD Guarujá
- 2007–2009: Pinheiros
- 2009–2010: Aurora Jesi
- 2010–2011: Paulistano
- 2011–2015: Pinheiros
- 2015–present: Bauru

Career highlights
- Brazilian League Sixth Man of the year (2012)
Medals
Men's basketball
Representing Brazil
FIBA South American Championship
Silver medal – second place	2004 Brazil	National Team

Paulo Heitor Boracini, also known as Paulinho (born December 26, 1984) is a Brazilian-Italian professional basketball player, who plays for Bauru of São Paulo, Brazil.

== Professional career ==
Paulinho was traded to Joinville before the third NBB season, to be the starting point guard of the team. He had previously played in teams like Pinheiros, Minas, Paulistano, Beijing Ducks (China) and Jesi (Italy).

== National team career ==
Paulinho was a member of the senior men's Brazilian national basketball team for the training camp of the national team on the road to the 2010 FIBA World Championship in Turkey.
