= Florida Roadkill =

1999 novel by Tim Dorsey

- First edition cover
- Author: Tim Dorsey
- Language: English
- Genre: Crime novel
- Publisher: William Morrow (USA) & HarperCollins (UK)
- Publication date: 1999
- Publication place: United States
- Media type: Print (Hardback & Paperback)
- Pages: 273 pp (first edition, hardback)
- ISBN: 0-688-16782-9 (first edition, hardback)
- OCLC: 40311591
- Dewey Decimal: 813/.54 21
- LC Class: PS3554.O719 F58 1999
- Preceded by: None (publication); Triggerfish Twist (chronology)
- Followed by: Hammerhead Ranch Motel

Cover of US paperback edition of Florida Roadkill

Florida Roadkill is a black comedy crime novel by Tim Dorsey, the first in his series centered around the character Serge A. Storms. It was published in 1999 by William Morrow and Company, an imprint of HarperCollins.

== Plot summary ==
Roadkill is set in 1997, against the backdrop of that year's World Series in which the Florida Marlins won a stunning upset in Miami, Florida.

The book begins in media res, with the discovery of three corpses in South Florida, whose murders are eventually described as the book reveals the events preceding them, starting 11 months before the World Series.

== Synopsis ==
Intelligent but sociopathic criminal Serge Storms meets up with heartless stripper Sharon Rhodes and brainless drug addict Seymore "Coleman" Bunsen, who become his travelling companions and partners in crime. After one of Sharon's customers, an oversexed orthodontist named George Veale, brags that his hands are insured for $5 million, Serge hatches a plan to defraud the insurance company and steal the entire settlement from Veale. The injury inflicted on Veale's hand (by a chainsaw) is grisly enough to convince the insurance company to pay out, but Veale panics, withdraws the entire amount from the bank, and hides the suitcase containing the cash in the trunk of a rental car being driven by two vacationing friends, Sean and David. Before Veale can retrieve the case, he is kidnapped by Serge and Co., who tie him up in a Cape Canaveral motel and kill him with an elaborate Rube Goldberg-type booby trap triggered by the vibrations of the nearby launch of the Space Shuttle Columbia.

Further complications arise when it is revealed that the insurance company is actually bankrupt of legitimate earnings, and the money paid to Veale was earmarked for delivery to a minor cocaine cartel. In a panic, the CEO of the company, Charles Saffron, details a private investigator and a series of bounty hunters to track down the suitcase, while himself evading a squad of enforcers sent by the cartel.

As they close in on the money, and already weary of the other's company, Serge and Sharon each separately decide to kill the other. Serge ambushes Sharon first, suffocating her by spraying liquid tire sealant down her throat. Later, the enforcers storm Serge and Coleman's hotel room in Key West, killing Coleman but missing Serge, who kills two of the three enforcers and escapes with a non-lethal gunshot wound. The last enforcer is killed by detective Susan Tchoupitoulas, who has been tracking Serge and Coleman. When Susan confronts Serge in the hotel's lobby, he recognizes her as the daughter of a Hillsborough County Sheriff's deputy whose life he saved thirteen years ago. Serge discards his own gun and walks out of the lobby, wagering (correctly) that Susan will not shoot an unarmed man.

A comic subplot deals with three bikeless bikers — Stinky, Ringworm and Cheese-Dick — who have been rejected from every biker group they have encountered and are on the down and out. They find an odd sort of niche as hired muscle in a retirement community, but are ultimately forced out by the community's owner, who wants the seniors kept as miserable as possible to extort money from them. The three bikers spend several days aboard a yacht on loan from the owner, but are marooned as soon as they have exhausted the engine's fuel (having no grasp of sailing or marine navigation). Stinky accidentally shoots Cheese-Dick with a flare gun while rummaging through the yacht's emergency gear, and a short while later, Ringworm and Stinky are both abducted by another boater, who ties them to cinder blocks and drowns them at sea.

A second, more serious subplot follows Sean and David, unaware of the $5 million in the trunk of their car, on their unsuccessful fishing trip to Key West, which includes stopping in Miami to watch the final game of the World Series. Saffron, believing he has finally found the drug money, follows them on their sight-seeing trip to Fort Jefferson, but all three of them are abducted by the same boater, who turns out to be Max Minimum, the disgraced manager of the retirement community, and secretly a perverted serial killer. Minimum pushes Saffron and Sean overboard, but David overpowers him with a head butt, causing Minimum to choke to death on the Barbie doll he had wedged in his mouth. Saffron drowns, but David deliberately tips himself and his cinder block overboard, managing to save both Sean and himself. After they return to Key West, Susan takes their statements, then treats them to dinner, where she and David develop an attraction to each other. They drive home, still unaware that the $5 million is concealed in the trunk of their car, or that Serge is still feverishly searching the county for them.

=== Johnny Vegas ===
Several of Dorsey's novels feature one or more failed attempts by his recurring character, Johnny Vegas, to finally lose his virginity. In this novel, Johnny regularly trolls the seaside parties of South Beach in a Cigarette boat whose colors mislead spectators into thinking it belongs to Dan Marino:

- Johnny lures a young college student onto his boat and is close to having sex with her, when she sees a bloated corpse float up with a chain around his neck (later revealed to be that of either Stinky or Ringworm);
- While Serge, Coleman and Sharon are touring South Beach, Sharon hitches a ride on Johnny's boat, and offers to have sex with him, but they are interrupted when a miniature caiman, that Serge bought at a gift shop and Coleman mistakenly placed in their hotel's freezer, thaws out and bites her ankle ferociously. She blames Johnny for the snafu and re-joins Serge and Coleman.

== Continuity ==
- A number of minor characters (such as Bradley Xeno, the boat captain, and McJagger, the retirement community operator) make minor appearances in the following book, Hammerhead Ranch Motel, which also features a passing reference to Stinky, Cheese-Dick and Ringworm.
- Dorsey's later novel Triggerfish Twist was published three years later, but the events of that novel take place at some unspecified point during the events of Florida Roadkill (as Dorsey's web site puts it, he didn't know what he was doing and killed too many characters he later decided he needed).
