= The Big Bamboo =

2006 novel by Tim Dorsey

- First edition cover
- Author: Tim Dorsey
- Language: English
- Series: Serge A. Storms
- Genre: Crime novel
- Publisher: William Morrow
- Publication date: 28 March 2006
- Publication place: United States
- Media type: Print (hardback & paperback)
- Pages: 352 pp
- ISBN: 0-06-058562-5
- OCLC: 60589223
- Dewey Decimal: 813/.54 22
- LC Class: PS3554.O719 B54 2006
- Preceded by: Torpedo Juice (novel)
- Followed by: Hurricane Punch

The Big Bamboo is the eighth novel by Tim Dorsey featuring the sociopathic anti-hero Serge A. Storms. It was published in the US in March 2006 and May 2006 in the UK. The plotline follows Serge A. Storms as he follows his recent obsession of Hollywood and movies, in particular the movie The Punisher, which was shot on location in Florida. Serge's grandfather Sergio is terminally ill, and Serge goes to spend time with him and learn about his recent exploits before the old man's death, all while being stalked by mysterious pursuers. His new obsession and a letter from Sergio inspire Serge to travel to Hollywood to write a screenplay, something that Coleman, his constantly addled companion, is constantly interrupting with obnoxious and sometimes outrageous concerns.

In Hollywood, they hire themselves out to stage an actress's kidnapping as part of a gambit by crooked studio executives seeking an excuse to cancel production of movie that they gave a director complete creative control over and which is now grossly over-budget. Yakuza investors in the movie studio and redneck victims of Sergio's last scam set out to kill Serge, who baffles his employers by partying around Hollywood with Coleman and their supposed hostage instead of laying low.

Another subplot involves a screenwriter who is trying to gain his intellectual property back from a major studio that is a parody of Miramax and is also framed for the kidnapping. The climax that reveals that the major characters of the story have been involved in a scam of massive proportions, at the height of which several studio executives are killed during a re-creation of the parting of the Red Sea.

The name of the book is taken from the now closed Big Bamboo lounge located south of Orlando, Florida which is featured in the book.
