= Nine Stories Productions =

US film, theater and TV production company

- Founded: 2015
- Headquarters: United States
- Key people: Riva Marker; Jake Gyllenhaal
- Website: ninestoriesproductions.com

Nine Stories Productions is a New York–based film, theater and television production company founded by Riva Marker and Jake Gyllenhaal in 2015. Nine Stories has a first-look deal with Bold Films, the company behind Whiplash, Drive, and Nightcrawler, the latter of which Gyllenhaal starred in and produced. Gyllenhaal won an Independent Spirit Award for producing Nightcrawler and was an executive producer on David Ayer's End of Watch. Marker produced Cary Fukunaga's critically acclaimed child soldier drama Beasts of No Nation and was an executive producer on Academy Award nominated The Kids Are All Right.

Following the deal with Bold Films, Gyllenhaal explained: "[They choose] to tell stories that I love—unflinching yet entertaining. I look forward to making movies that are successful both artistically and financially. That's what [Bold CEO] Gary [Michael Waters] and [Chairman] Michel [Litvak] do. They are nonconformists who have already proven to be terrific partners on 'Nightcrawler'—protecting stories and the artists who tell them." Litvak added: "We are thrilled to be back in business with Jake. I truly enjoy our artistic collaboration. His impeccable taste in projects and deep knowledge of how to make high quality films make him a formidable producer."

Nine Stories aims to develop and produce provocative, character-driven material at both the studio and independent levels. The company's first film, David Gordon Green's Stronger, is inspired by the true story of Boston Marathon bombing survivor Jeff Bauman and based on the New York Times bestseller of the same name. The film premiered at the 2017 Toronto International Film Festival and was released to critical acclaim on September 22, 2017, by Lionsgate and Roadside Attractions.

Nine Stories produced Wildlife, Paul Dano's directorial debut in which Gyllenhaal stars opposite Carey Mulligan. The company produced the documentary Hondros about war photographer Chris Hondros—who was killed on assignment in Libya—which premiered at the 2017 Tribeca Film Festival, where it won the Audience Award for Best Documentary.

Nine Stories is currently in development on a number of titles, including Jo Nesbø's critically acclaimed novel The Son, which Denis Villeneuve will direct; David Leitch's adaptation of Ubisoft's post-apocalyptic video game The Division, in which Gyllenhaal will also star, and a scripted limited series for A&E centered on cults throughout history. The company is also developing Seth Harp's Rolling Stone article "The Anarchists vs. the Islamic State" for the screen, and Theater of War, based on an episode of This American Life with director Alex Timbers for the stage and screen.

In the spring of 2017, the company produced its first Broadway show with a revival of Stephen Sondheim's Sunday in the Park with George at the newly reopened Hudson Theatre, starring Gyllenhaal and Tony winner, Annaleigh Ashford. The production was the first commercially successful run of a Sondheim musical.

On April 2, 2024, the company signed a three-year first-look deal with Amazon MGM Studios, with a film adaptation of the musical Fun Home, which they acquired the rights to years before, announced to still be in development at the studio.

== Filmography ==
| Year | Title | Director |
|---|---|---|
| 2017 | Hondros | Greg Campbell |
| 2017 | Stronger | David Gordon Green |
| 2018 | Wildlife | Paul Dano |
| 2020 | Relic | Natalie Erika James |
| 2020 | Joe Bell | Reinaldo Marcus Green |
| 2020 | The Devil All the Time | Antonio Campos |
| 2021 | Breaking News in Yuba County | Tate Taylor |
| 2021 | The Guilty | Antoine Fuqua |
| 2024 | Presumed Innocent | David E. Kelley |
| 2024 | Vow of Silence: The Assassination of Annie Mae | Yvonne Russo |
| TBA | Road House 2 | Ilya Naishuller |
