= Bold Films =

American independent film production and finance company

- Company type: Private
- Industry: Multimedia
- Founded: 2004; 22 years ago
- Headquarters: Los Angeles, U.S.
- Key people: Jeff Kleeman (CEO); Erich Ebner (Director, Productions, Licensing & Operations); Sophia Kalin (Creative Executive); David Litvak (Chairman)
- Products: Motion pictures TV shows Theater
- Website: boldfilms.com

Bold Films is an American independent multimedia production and finance company. It was founded in 2004.

== History ==
Bold's first three films were Slingshot, Come Early Morning and Mini's First Time. In 2006 the company had its first hit, producing and financing the Golden Globe-nominated period piece Bobby, written and directed by Emilio Estevez. In 2009 Bold produced and released Joe Dante's 3D thriller The Hole, which won an award for Best 3D Film at the Venice Film Festival. Roger Ebert called the best use of 3D ever. In 2010 Bold had its first major studio film Legion, which was co-financed and released by Screen Gems, a division of Sony Pictures Entertainment. In 2011 Bold co-produced and co-financed with OddLot Entertainment Drive starring Ryan Gosling and Carey Mulligan, for which director Nicolas Winding Refn won the Best Director Award at the Cannes Film Festival while also receiving accolades from the BAFTA Awards, The Golden Globes and Academy Awards. In 2014 the company produced and financed Nightcrawler starring Jake Gyllenhaal, and Whiplash with Blumhouse Productions, the latter of which received five Academy Award nominations, including Best Picture. Other awards nominations for the film include the Spirit Awards, PGA Awards, SAG Awards, and WGA Awards.

The company also produces content for television, including the short-lived ABC series Black Box and the Syfy series Dominion.

In February 2015, Bold Films opened offices in London and produced its first UK production Colette, which starred Keira Knightley and Dominic West. Colette was nominated for Best Screenplay at the Independent Spirit Awards that year.

In 2021, Bold Films produced and financed The Guilty, directed by Antoine Fuqua and starring Jake Gyllenhaal which was released on Netflix. This adaptation of the Sundance Audience Award-winning Danish film Den Skyldige, was seen by 69 million households in the first 28 days on the platform, and was its top movie in 91 countries. Bold Films also produced the Emmy nominated Oslo in 2021, which was based on the Tony Award-winning play of the same name.

Jeff Kleeman joined Bold Films as CEO in 2023, succeeding Gary Michael Walters, and now oversees the company's film, tv and franchise expansion efforts.

== Filmography ==
Year	Film	Director
2005	Slingshot	Jay Alaimo
2006	Come Early Morning	Joey Lauren Adams
2006	Mini's First Time	Nick Guthe
2006	Bobby	Emilio Estevez
2008	Starship Troopers 3: Marauder	Ed Neumeier
2008	Middle of Nowhere	John Stockwell
2009	The Hole	Joe Dante
2010	Legion	Scott Stewart
2011	Drive	Nicolas Winding Refn
2013	Heatstroke	Evelyn Purcell
2013	Evidence	Olatunde Osunsanmi
2013	Only God Forgives	Nicolas Winding Refn
2014	Whiplash	Damien Chazelle
2014	Nightcrawler	Dan Gilroy
2015	Lost River	Ryan Gosling
2015	No Escape	John Erick Dowdle
2016	Shot Caller	Ric Roman Waugh
2016	The Neon Demon	Nicolas Winding Refn
2017	Hondros	Greg Campbell
2017	Stronger	David Gordon Green
2018	Colette	Wash Westmoreland
2018	Vox Lux	Brady Corbet
2019	Above Suspicion	Phillip Noyce
2021	Oslo	Bartlett Sher
2021	The Guilty	Antoine Fuqua

Year	Series	Creator
2014	Black Box	Amy Holden Jones
2014	Dominion	Vaun Wilmott
