= The Orphanage (company) =

American visual effects studio

- Industry: Visual effects
- Founded: 1999
- Founder: Stu Maschwitz; Jonathan Rothbart; Scott Stewart
- Defunct: 2009
- Headquarters: San Francisco, California

The Orphanage was an American visual effects studio located in California. It had offices in Los Angeles and San Francisco. It was co-founded in 1999 by Stu Maschwitz, Jonathan Rothbart, and Scott Stewart, who all previously worked at Industrial Light & Magic. Scott Kirsner at Hollywood Reporter interviewed a couple of the founders, and writes about the company and its plans. Stu Maschwitz created the Magic Bullet software which gives video a film look, and wrote a book about guerrilla filmmaking called The DV Rebel's Guide: An All-Digital Approach to Making Killer Action Movies on the Cheap.

The Orphanage was known for its work on both commercials and features. The company then launched but later closed Orphanage Animation Studios which was headed up by Genndy Tartakovsky, and was due to make their film debut with the ill-fated Power of the Dark Crystal. They never made any projects except for Sym-Bionic Titan.

The Orphanage did approximately 640 shots for the "That Yellow Bastard" section of Sin City (2005). as well as three other films with Robert Rodriguez, Spy Kids 3-D: Game Over, The Adventures of Sharkboy and Lavagirl in 3-D, and the Quentin Tarantino/Robert Rodriguez co-directed double feature Grindhouse.

The company has worked on a number of Hollywood blockbusters including Superman Returns, Night at the Museum, Pirates of the Caribbean: Dead Man's Chest & At World's End, and the Korean blockbuster The Host. They created the Heads-up display (HUD) for the hi-tech suit of armour in the Marvel Studios production of Iron Man, for which their work was nominated for a 2008 VES Award (for Best Compositing).

They have also created commercials and a handful of Super Bowl spots for clients as varied as Comcast, Toshiba, HP, Benadryl, Nicoderm, and several award-winning spots for Sony PlayStation's Ratchet & Clank: Going Commando.

On February 4, 2009, the company announced it was suspending operations indefinitely, after 10 years in the business. The announcement was made by company co-founders Stu Maschwitz, Scott Stewart, and Jonathan Rothbart, and announced on Mr. Maschwitz's blog. No immediate notice was posted on the company's website. Although the announcement gave no reason for the closing, bloggers attributed the closing to general economic conditions.

== The Orphanage selected filmography ==
Year	Notable films
2001	Vanilla Sky
2002	Point of Origin
2002	Path to War
2002	Hero
2002	Jackass: The Movie
2003	Jeepers Creepers 2
2003	Seabiscuit
2003	Spy Kids 3-D: Game Over
2003	Anger Management
2003	Charlie's Angels: Full Throttle
2004	50 First Dates
2004	The Day After Tomorrow
2004	Iron Jawed Angels
2004	Garfield: The Movie
2004	The Princess Diaries 2: Royal Engagement
2004	Sky Captain and the World of Tomorrow
2004	Hellboy
2004	The Forgotten
2005	Cursed
2005	Sin City
2005	The Adventures of Sharkboy and Lavagirl in 3-D
2005	Harry Potter and the Goblet of Fire
2005	Aeon Flux
2006	Pirates of the Caribbean: Dead Man's Chest
2006	Pulse
2006	Superman Returns
2006	How to Eat Fried Worms
2006	Night at the Museum
2006	The Host
2007	Pirates of the Caribbean: At World's End
2007	The Last Mimzy
2007	Grindhouse
2007	Fantastic Four: Rise of the Silver Surfer
2007	Live Free or Die Hard
2007	I Know Who Killed Me
2007	Blade Runner: The Final Cut
2008	In the Name of the King: A Dungeon Siege Tale
2008	Iron Man
2008	Untraceable
2008	Will Eisner's The Spirit
2008	You Don't Mess with the Zohan
2008	Red Cliff
2009	Legion
2010	Iron Man 2
2010	Sym-Bionic Titan
