= Michel Litvak =

Belgian businessman founder of Bold Films (born 1951)

- Born: August 1951 (age 75); Leningrad
- Occupation: Businessman

Michel Litvak (born August 1951) is a Belgian businessman who made his fortune in commodity logistics. He founded Bold Films. The Russian actress Svetlana Metkina is his life partner.

== Early life ==
Litvak was born in Leningrad in 1951. Both of Litvak's parents were Russian Jews. His mother survived the siege of the city during World War II, while his father was one of the few in his large family to survive the Nazis. The Litvak family left the Soviet Union and immigrated to Belgium via Poland, settling in Brussels in 1962.

== Career ==
=== Businessman ===
While in Belgium in 1974, Litvak managed secured financing to start his first business venture - a chain of medical laboratories. In parallel, he became a commodity trader. In 1990, following the collapse of the Soviet Union, Michel Litvak moved back to Russia and settled in Moscow. Litvak began by building up consumer goods trading activity between Russia and China, and his became the largest business of its kind for several years. He later pioneered a new private industry in Russia, being the first to offer Russian energy companies transportation and logistics outsourcing services. His company, OTEKO Group, became the leader in this field, and, over time, owned the largest fleet of rail tankers.

=== OTЭKO ===
In 2000 Litvak began acquiring vast plots of land suitable for a deep sea harbor by the Black Sea. In 2004, OTEKO started building its harbor in Taman. It was a hugely complex engineering program, which today is one of Russia's largest private investment projects. The project, from its inception, never received public funding in any form whatsoever. Following its massive private investment, in 2012 OTEKO opened its energy terminal; in 2019 it opened its dry bulk terminal, and plans to open a grain and dry bulk cargo terminal are in progress. On July 4, 2019, The Interdisciplinary Center Herzliya honored Litvak for his contributions to society.

=== Bold Films ===
Litvak established Bold Films, a Hollywood film production company that has produced several notable movies over the years such as Bobby, Drive, Nightcrawler, and Whiplash, which was nominated for five Academy Awards and won three (see below).

== Notable feature films ==
- Bobby (2006)
- Legion (2010)
- Drive (2011)
- Whiplash (2014)
