= The Guilty (2021 film) =

American crime thriller by Antoine Fuqua

- Official release poster
- Directed by: Antoine Fuqua
- Screenplay by: Nic Pizzolatto
- Based on: Den skyldige by: Gustav Möller; Emil Nygaard Albertsen
- Produced by: Jake Gyllenhaal; Riva Marker; David Litvak; Gary Michael Walters; David Haring; Michel Litvak; Svetlana Metkina; Antoine Fuqua; Scott Greenberg; Kat Samick
- Starring: Jake Gyllenhaal; Christina Vidal Mitchell; Ethan Hawke; Riley Keough; Eli Goree; Da'Vine Joy Randolph; Paul Dano; Peter Sarsgaard
- Cinematography: Maz Makhani
- Edited by: Jason Ballantine
- Music by: Marcelo Zarvos
- Production companies: Bold Films; Amet Entertainment; Capstone Pictures; Nine Stories Productions; Fuqua Films
- Distributed by: Netflix
- Release dates: September 11, 2021 (TIFF); September 24, 2021 (United States)
- Running time: 90 minutes
- Country: United States
- Language: English

The Guilty is a 2021 American crime thriller film directed and produced by Antoine Fuqua, from a screenplay by Nic Pizzolatto. A remake of the 2018 Danish film of the same name, the film stars Jake Gyllenhaal and Christina Vidal, with the voices of Ethan Hawke, Riley Keough, Eli Goree, Da'Vine Joy Randolph, Paul Dano, and Peter Sarsgaard.

The Guilty had its world premiere at the 2021 Toronto International Film Festival on September 11, 2021. The film was released in a limited release on September 24, 2021, then digitally on Netflix on October 1. It received positive reviews from critics, with Gyllenhaal's performance being praised, but it is felt that the remake was inferior to the original film.

== Plot ==
Troubled LAPD officer Joe Baylor works the night shift at a 911 call center while awaiting a court hearing for an incident that occurred on duty eight months prior. He answers a call from Emily Lighton, a woman who states she has been abducted. While traveling in a white van, Emily is forced to hang up before she can provide more details. Joe relays the information to the California Highway Patrol, who cannot locate the van without a license plate number.

Joe calls Emily's home phone and speaks with her six-year-old daughter Abby, who tells him that her mom left the house with her dad, Henry Fisher. After getting Henry's cell phone number from Abby, he is able to retrieve the van's plate number.

Joe also learns that Henry has a record of assault, so he calls Sergeant Miller to send a patrol unit to Emily's home to do a welfare check on Abby and her baby brother, Oliver. He also requests he send another to investigate Henry's apartment. Miller refuses to send anyone to Henry's without a warrant. Reminding Joe of his legal issues, Miller suggests he stop investigating. Afterwards, Joe calls Henry and demands to know where he is taking Emily. Henry hangs up after Joe starts asking questions in an accusatory tone. Joe then calls his former partner, Rick, who is off-duty. Joe asks him to go to Henry's house. Rick complies, but also expresses concern about Joe's upcoming hearing at which he is set to provide testimony.

Joe receives a panicked call from Abby when two officers arrive at her home; he instructs her to let them in. The officers notice blood on Abby and, upon searching the property, find Oliver in the bedroom either gravely injured or dead. Joe calls Henry and accuses him of killing his son. Henry hangs up again. On the line again with Emily, Joe tells her to try to crash the van. Emily makes an attempt, to no avail.

Meanwhile, Rick breaks into Henry's apartment and finds documents showing that Emily had recently been a patient in a psychiatric treatment facility in San Bernardino. Back on the phone with Emily, she admits she thinks she will die and does not want to be locked up again. Emily goes on to say that she believed Oliver had "snakes in his stomach" and that she "took them out." Joe realizes that Emily was the one who hurt baby Oliver, and Henry is trying to have her readmitted to the psychiatric hospital. Outside of the van, Emily hits Henry with a brick and runs away.

On the phone with Joe, Henry explains that she had been off her medication for a number of weeks, as they could not afford them. Henry feels guilty about having left Emily, believing this triggered the psychotic episode during which she hurt Oliver. Henry does not trust the police and the criminal justice system due to his own legal troubles and because of the many failed attempts by various government agencies to help his mentally ill wife. Emily does not know what she has done and Henry fears what she will do after she finds out.

Eventually, Emily calls Joe back from a freeway overpass, while preparing to commit suicide. Joe directs the CHP to her location while attempting to talk her down; he tries to distract her by revealing that he killed a 19-year-old while on duty because he was angry with him for hurting someone. Joe tells Emily that Abby needs her and that he promised Abby she would come home. As officers arrive, Emily hangs up. After repeated attempts to call her back, Joe calls the CHP dispatcher who conveys that Emily is alive. He then learns that baby Oliver is alive and in the hospital, recovering from his injuries.

An overcome Joe calls Rick and asks him to tell the truth at the hearing, even if it means he will spend years in prison. Joe then announces to the media that he will plead guilty to a charge of manslaughter.

== Cast ==
- Jake Gyllenhaal as Joe Baylor
- Christina Vidal Mitchell as Sergeant Denise Wade
- Adrian Martinez as Manny

=== Voices ===
- Ethan Hawke as Sergeant Bill Miller
- Riley Keough as Emily Lighton
- Eli Goree as Rick
- Da'Vine Joy Randolph as CHP Dispatcher
- David Castañeda as Officer Tim Geraci
- Paul Dano as Matthew Fontenot
- Peter Sarsgaard as Henry Fisher, Emily's husband
- Bill Burr as Nightclub Caller
- Beau Knapp as Dru Nashe
- Edi Patterson as Katherine Harbor
- Marlene Forte as House on Fire Caller
- Christiana Montoya as Abby, Emily and Henry's daughter
- Gillian Zinser as Jess Baylor, Joe's ex-wife
- Dillon Lane as Crashed Cyclist
- Aileen Burdock as LA Times Operator

== Production ==
In December 2018, it was announced Jake Gyllenhaal had acquired rights to the 2018 Danish thriller film The Guilty, and would star in and produce a remake under his Nine Stories Productions banner, alongside Bold Films. In September 2020, it was announced Antoine Fuqua would direct and produce the film, from a screenplay by Nic Pizzolatto with uncredited revisions from Gyllenhaal. Later that month, Netflix acquired worldwide rights to the film for $30 million. In November 2020, Ethan Hawke, Peter Sarsgaard, Riley Keough, Paul Dano, Byron Bowers, Da'Vine Joy Randolph, David Castaneda, Christina Vidal, Adrian Martinez, Bill Burr, Beau Knapp and Edi Patterson joined the cast of the film.

Principal photography began in Los Angeles in November 2020, during the COVID-19 pandemic, and lasted for 11 days. Three days before production was set to begin, a person in contact with director Antoine Fuqua tested positive for COVID-19. Fuqua tested negative subsequently, so the production was still on schedule. He directed the entire film from a van called Colorspace with screens that had access to the cameras, maintaining contact with the cast and the crew.

== Release and reception ==
The Guilty had its world premiere at the 2021 Toronto International Film Festival on September 11, 2021. It received a limited release on September 24, 2021, prior to streaming on Netflix on October 1, 2021.

The film was streamed in 69 million households over the first month of its release, and was the top-watched film on the platform in 91 countries.

=== Critical response ===
On the review aggregator website Rotten Tomatoes, the film holds an approval rating of 74% based on 191 reviews, with an average rating of 6.5/10. The website's critical consensus reads, "The Guilty is another Americanized remake overshadowed by the original, but its premise is still sturdy enough to support a tense, well-acted thriller." Metacritic gave the film a weighted average score of 63 out of 100 based on 35 critics, indicating "generally favorable" reviews.

== Stage version ==
In 2026, a stage version of The Guilty opened at the Donmar Warehouse in London. The stage adaptation was by Chloë Moss, based on the 2018 screenplay by Gustav Möller and Emil Nygaard Albertsen, and starred Russell Tovey.
