= Hondros (film) =

- Film poster
- Directed by: Greg Campbell
- Written by: Greg Campbell; Jenny Golden
- Produced by: Greg Campbell; Daniel Junge; Geoff McLean; Mike Shum
- Starring: Chris Hondros
- Cinematography: Mike Shum
- Edited by: Davis Coombe; Jenny Golden; Cindy Lee
- Music by: Jeff Russo
- Production companies: Bold Films; Nine Stories Productions; Fox Tale Films; Vision Film Company
- Distributed by: Entertainment Studios Motion Pictures
- Release dates: April 21, 2017 (Tribeca); March 2, 2018 (United States)
- Running time: 90 minutes
- Country: United States
- Language: English

Hondros is a 2017 American documentary film about American war photographer Chris Hondros. It was written by Greg Campbell and Jenny Golden, directed and produced by Campbell, and executive produced by Jake Gyllenhaal and Jamie Lee Curtis.

The film premiered on 21 April 2017 at Tribeca Film Festival, where it won the Audience Award, Documentary First Place. It had a limited theatrical release in the United States on 2 March 2018.

Hondros was killed in a mortar attack by government forces in Misrata while covering the 2011 Libyan civil war.

== Film summary ==
The film is about the life and career of Hondros. It describes the stories behind some of his photographs.

== Production ==
In 2013, Greg Campbell launched a Kickstarter campaign to produce a documentary then named Hondros: A Life in Frames. The project was launched with an initial goal of $30,000 and became fully funded within three days with a total of $89,639 raised.

== Awards ==
- Audience Award, Documentary First Place, Tribeca Film Festival, New York City
