= Technician (newspaper) =

Student newspaper of North Carolina State University

- Type: Weekly student newspaper
- Format: Modified tabloid
- School: North Carolina State University
- Owner: NC State Student Media
- Editor-in-chief: Skye Crawford
- Founded: February 1, 1920
- Language: English
- Headquarters: Witherspoon Student Center
- City: Raleigh, North Carolina
- Country: United States of America
- Sister newspapers: The Nubian Message
- OCLC number: 15522593
- Website: technicianonline.com
- Free online archives: d.lib.ncsu.edu/collections/technician/calendar

Technician is the student newspaper of North Carolina State University. Its first edition was published in 1920, and it has been published continuously since that date, becoming a daily paper in fall 1988. Since 2018, the newspaper has been published on Thursdays, with stories also published online throughout the week on its website. The newspaper is funded by in-paper and online advertising and is a part of NC State Student Media. NC State's Student Media Board of Directors oversees NC State Student Media, which includes Technician, other student-led publications, and a college radio station, WKNC-FM.

== Notable alumni ==
- Alvin M. Fountain, college historian
- Roy H. Park, media mogul, founder of broadcasting and newspaper chain Park Communications Inc.
- William C. Friday (1941), American educator and leader of the University of North Carolina system from 1956-86.
- Chris Hondros, photographer and 2003 finalist for the Pulitzer Prize
- Ted Kemp, digital managing editor for CNBC International and co-author of The Ragged Edge: A US Marine's Account of Leading the Iraqi Army Fifth Battalion.
- Richard Curtis (1972), a founder and managing editor of graphics and photography for USA Today
- Joseph Galarneau (1989), chief operating officer and digital general manager of Newsweek and The Daily Beast

== Controversies ==
Like many student newspapers, Technician has seen its share of controversies, including:

- In 1990, the newspaper ran an editorial calling for the dismissal of embattled head basketball coach Jim Valvano. Valvano, a popular figure who led the team to the 1983 national championship, had come under fire for ethical and regulatory lapses in handling the basketball program. The editorial was presented as a publicity stunt. Valvano ultimately left the university under fire.
- On September 3, 1992, a conservative opinion columnist harshly criticized African-American students' demands for a black cultural center at the University of North Carolina at Chapel Hill. This column, paired with a front-page article with the headline "Black Students Vent Rage in Dining Hall"—a report on a NC State Student Government meeting to get feedback from African-American students on campus in a follow-up to recent events in Chapel Hill—resulted in widespread theft of the edition (it is distributed free). Students also burned copies of the Technician in the Brickyard in protest. The aftermath led to the creation of the university's African-American interest publication, Nubian Message.
- Following disastrous Wolfpack basketball seasons in 1995 and 1996, Technician published staff editorials asking for the resignation or firing of coach Les Robinson. The editorials were timed to run on the eve of the ACC Tournament play-in game for last-place teams, which had become known throughout the conference as "The Les Robinson Invitational." Robinson resigned following his team's loss at the tournament. Asked if he had any regrets at his farewell press conference, Robinson said, "Only that the school paper called me a loser."
- After new leadership took the helm at the paper in Spring 1997, several Technician editors and reporters were fired without just cause and escorted from the newspaper's offices by university public safety officers. Two months later, three of the fired editors used their inside knowledge of the production process to hijack the last edition of the paper for the school year, secretly inserting a full-column editorial criticizing the new editor-in-chief for using her power over personnel matters to settle personal scores and calling on university administrators to intervene. All 18,000 copies of the paper were distributed on campus the next morning containing the critical editorial, and the new student management was left unable to retract it until the resumption of publication the following semester. Technician's insulted editor-in-chief filed a report with public safety, which investigated the matter as a larceny. Despite dusting for fingerprints and questioning the former employees, investigators were unable to find any evidence against the suspected perpetrators and no charges were filed.
- On August 29, 2005, a crowd of approximately 200 Greek Life and African American Student Advisory Council representatives gathered on Harris Field to protest a Technician article entitled "Sorostitutes are weak and wounded." Students complained the article was an unfair representation of women's activities in Greek Life. While the event received a lot of media attention, it was quickly overshadowed by Hurricane Katrina's destruction on the Gulf Coast.
- In January 2006, Technician ran an article by student contributor Jeff Gaither, stating that drunk driving was at times unavoidable and giving tips on how to avoid getting caught. The author subsequently wrote a retraction of the article.
- In February 2014, Editor-in-Chief Sam DeGrave discontinued the traditional "Daily Tar Hell" satire newspaper while citing racist, sexist, and homophobic humor of past editions as his motivation for halting the ever-popular publication. Several students and alumni were unhappy with the decision and consequently sent a plethora of letters to the editor to voice their frustration. Many argued that the "hateful humor" was not prevalent in recent years and the satire was all in good taste while others were upset to see one of the few longstanding traditions of the university being tampered with. Very few wrote letters in support of the decision to discontinue the satire edition. DeGrave published a letter from the editor titled "One week in Daily Tar Hell", in which he condescendingly responded to his readers' criticism. Nonetheless, the "Daily Tar Hell" was later brought back into publication.
