= 2005 Tal Afar shooting =

Shooting incident in Iraq

January 2005 Tal Afar shootings
- Part of US war crimes in Iraq
- Location of Nineveh Governorate in Iraq
- Location: Tal Afar, Nineveh Governorate, Iraq
- Date: 18 January 2005
- Deaths: 2
- Perpetrator: United States Armed Forces

On 18 January 2005 at dusk, two parents were shot dead in the city of Tal Afar in northern Iraq, as they were driving home, by a United States Army patrol. One of their five children in the back seat was seriously injured. The Army claimed they ignored hand signals and warning shots. American war photojournalist Chris Hondros took pictures of the aftermath.

Tal Afar was the scene of frequent clashes between American soldiers and Iraqi guerrillas. The Hassan family, ethnic Turkomans, were driving home at dusk on 18 January 2005 when they were spotted by a routine Army patrol. The parents, Hussein and Camila Hassan, were in the front seat, and their five children in the back. The Army issued a statement claiming the car kept approaching despite hand signals and warning shots.

When the vehicle did not stop, the soldiers opened fire, killing both parents and wounding 11-year-old Rakan. His sister Samar later wrote a book titled Testament in which she stated that he was paralyzed with a bullet near his spine. (Rakan received intensive treatment in Boston and regained the ability to walk; he returned to Iraq but was killed in 2008.) The family was given $7500 compensation for the deaths.

American war photojournalist Chris Hondros was embedded with the patrol and took pictures immediately after the shooting. One of them, "One Night in Tal Afar", won him the 2005 Robert Capa Gold Medal. He also won the National Press Photographers Association 2006 Best of Photojournalism award, though sources do not specify if it was for the same photograph or another.
