= Maschwitz =

Maschwitz may refer to:

== People ==
- Eric Maschwitz (1901– 1969), English entertainer, writer, editor, broadcaster and broadcasting executive
- Stu Maschwitz, was the co-founder and chief technology officer of The Orphanage, a visual effects company that was based in California

== Places ==
- Ingeniero Maschwitz, is a town in the Escobar Partido of the Buenos Aires Province, Argentina
