= Breakfast with a View to the Elbrus Mountains =

- Russian: Завтрак с видом на Эльбрус
- Directed by: Nikolai Maletsky
- Written by: Yevgeny Bogatyryov; Nikolai Maletsky; Yuri Morozov; Yuri Vizbor
- Produced by: Semyon Ryabikov
- Starring: Igor Kostolevsky; Vera Sotnikova; Vera Kanshina; Igor Shavlak; Albert Filozov
- Cinematography: Anatoly Grishko
- Edited by: L. Astreina
- Music by: Gennady Gladkov
- Production company: Studio Ekran
- Release date: 1993
- Running time: 75 min.
- Country: Russia
- Language: Russian

Breakfast with a View to the Elbrus Mountains (Russian: Завтрак с видом на Эльбрус, romanized: Zavtrak s vidom na Elbrus) is a 1993 Russian romantic drama film directed by Nikolai Maletsky. The film adaptation of the novel of the same name by Yuri Vizbor.

The film tells about the journalist Pavel Denisov, who broke up with his beloved woman Larisa and went to the mountains, where he met another woman who fell in love with him.

== Plot ==
The film follows Pavel Denisov, a Moscow journalist who leaves his family for Larisa, the woman he passionately loves. Yet, his life spirals when Larisa abruptly leaves him, prompting Pavel to escape his sorrow by resigning from his job and moving to Mount Elbrus to work as a ski instructor. His close friend Sergey, a businessman known as "The Log," visits to offer support. During his time at the ski resort, Pavel encounters Elena Vladimirovna, a married woman among his students, who develops romantic feelings for him. Though Pavel appears indifferent, he keeps a friendly rapport with her until she confesses her love, even revealing it to her husband. Though he finds Elena intriguing, Pavel remains unable to reciprocate, haunted by memories of Larisa. Meanwhile, another student, Slava Pugachyov, learns to ski to impress a foreign businessman and confides in Pavel about a woman in Moscow who recently fell for him. When both men try to contact Moscow, they discover that the woman who admires Slava is, in fact, Larisa.

As the season draws to a close, Pavel's editor invites him back to his job, marking the beginning of his return to Moscow. Before leaving, Elena professes her enduring affection for him, despite his rejection. Pavel resumes life with his mother and his job at the editorial office, until his editor introduces him to a foreign businessman hosting a tennis tournament, planning an interview. Unexpectedly, Larisa appears as the businessman's wife, stirring unresolved emotions in Pavel. Later, on his way home, Pavel notices a woman stranded by a broken-down car and impulsively asks the trolleybus driver to stop. As he approaches to help, he realizes that the woman is none other than Elena, bringing the two face-to-face once more.

== Cast ==
- Igor Kostolevsky
- Vera Sotnikova
- Vera Kanshina
- Igor Shavlak
- Albert Filozov
- Mikhail Filippov
- Veniamin Smekhov
- Natalya Rychagova
- Mikhail Gamulin
- Andrei Sukhar
- Yuri Sarantsev
