= Svetlana Metkina =

Russian actress from Moscow (born 1974)

- Born: Svetlana Aleksandrovna Metkina; 7 January 1974 (age 52); Moscow, RSFSR, Soviet Union
- Occupation: Actress
- Years active: 1994-present
- Spouse: Michel Litvak

Svetlana Aleksandrovna Metkina (Russian: Светлана Александровна Меткина; born 7 January 1974), also known as Lana Litvak, is a Russian actress and film producer from Moscow. She is known outside Russia for playing the Czechoslovak reporter Lenka Janáček in the 2006 film Bobby.

== Filmography ==
=== Film ===
==== As actor ====
Year	Title	Role	Notes
1994	Three Hundred Years After	Katenka	
1998	Aila	Alya	
2003	Barbarian	Gilda	Direct-to-video
2005	The Second Front	Olga Ryabina	
2005	Slingshot	Fast Bobby	
2006	Mini's First Time	Jelena	
2006	Bobby	Lenka	
2007	Trackman	Katya	
2009	Knife Edge	Lucy	
2012	1812. Ulanskaya ballada	Valevskaya	
2013	Evidence	Vicki Makarova	
2013	Heatstroke	Tally	

==== As producer ====
Year	Title	Notes
2018	Colette	Executive producer
2018	Vox Lux	
2021	Oslo	Television film
2021	The Guilty	

=== Television ===
Year	Title	Role	Notes
2003	Sokrovishcha myortvykh	Anya	6 episodes

== Awards and nominations ==
Year	Award	Category	Nominated work	Result
2006	Hollywood Film Awards	Ensemble of the Year	Bobby	Won
2007	Critics' Choice Movie Awards	Best Acting Ensemble	Bobby	Nominated
2007	Screen Actors Guild Awards	Outstanding Performance by a Cast in a Motion Picture	Bobby	Nominated
2021	Primetime Emmy Awards	Outstanding Television Movie	Oslo	Nominated
