= Chlorine (2013 film) =

- Theatrical release poster
- Directed by: Jay Alaimo
- Written by: Jay Alaimo; Matthew Fiorello
- Produced by: Gary Giudice; Christopher Beatty; Joseph Mazzella; Matt Parker
- Starring: Kyra Sedgwick; Vincent D'Onofrio; Flora Cross; Ryan Donowho; Jordan Belfi; Elisabeth Röhm; Michele Hicks; Dreama Walker; Brian Petsos; Matt Ball; Rhys Coiro; Tom Sizemore
- Cinematography: Paul J. Daley
- Edited by: Jamie Kirkpatrick; David Leonard
- Music by: Jay Lifton
- Production company: Company Motion Pictures
- Distributed by: Gravitas Ventures
- Release dates: March 17, 2013 (Sun Valley Film Festival); February 28, 2014 (United States)
- Running time: 95 minutes
- Country: United States
- Language: English

Chlorine is a 2013 American comedy-drama film directed and written by Jay Alaimo. Filming mainly took place in Madison, New Jersey and Wayne, New Jersey.

== Plot ==
Roger Lent has worked at the same bank for more than twenty years. He is passed over for a promotion and his wife is not happy because she wants the good life. The family can barely afford a membership at Copper Canyon Country Club, and everyone else has these nice mansions. Roger's boss tells him he has to make more money for the bank in order to get a promotion. One way is to encourage people to invest in Copper Canyon Estates, where Roger's son Henry is being told to cut corners. Roger's daughter Cynthia is having to deal with her first period and becoming a teenager. After getting tennis pro/drug dealer Pat to invest his money, Roger finds out Copper Canyon Estates is a Ponzi scheme and he must decide whether to do the right thing.

== Cast ==
- Kyra Sedgwick as Georgie
- Vincent D'Onofrio as Roger
- Flora Cross as Cynthia
- Ryan Donowho as Henry
- Rhys Coiro as Pat
- Tom Sizemore as Ernie
- Jordan Belfi as Doug
- Elisabeth Röhm as Catherine
- Michele Hicks as Elise
- Dreama Walker as Suzi
- Brian Petsos as Anderson
- Matt Ball as Josh
- Eddie Guerra as Ted
- Tristine Skyler as Trudy
- Britt Napier as "Binky"
- Todd Detwiler as Jeff
- Michael Janik as Junior
- Jackie Moore as Bookstore Owner
- Nik Belcevich as Michael
- Logan Hunter as Gus

== Release ==
Chlorine premiered at the Sun Valley Film Festival in Idaho on March 17, 2013.

=== Critical reception ===
On review aggregator Rotten Tomatoes, Chlorine has an approval rating of 8% based on 13 reviews.
