= Evidence (2013 film) =

- Theatrical release poster
- Directed by: Olatunde Osunsanmi
- Written by: John Swetnam
- Produced by: Marc Platt; Adam Siegel; Nik Mavikurve; Michel Litvak; David Lancaster; Jeffrey Stott; Anthony Rhulen
- Starring: Stephen Moyer; Radha Mitchell; Torrey DeVitto; Caitlin Stasey; Harry Lennix; Svetlana Metkina; Dale Dickey
- Cinematography: Lukas Ettlin
- Edited by: Paul Covington
- Music by: Atli Örvarsson
- Production company: Bold Films
- Distributed by: Image Entertainment
- Release date: July 19, 2013
- Running time: 98 minutes
- Country: United States
- Language: English

Evidence is a 2013 crime thriller film directed by Olatunde Osunsanmi and written by John Swetnam. The film stars Torrey DeVitto, Caitlin Stasey, Harry Lennix, Svetlana Metkina, Dale Dickey, Radha Mitchell, and Stephen Moyer and was released by Bold Films on July 19, 2013. It follows two detectives on their investigation of a brutal massacre, with their only leads being recording devices found at the crime scene.

== Plot ==
In the aftermath of the massacre in Kidwell, Nevada, police examine the crime scene. At the press conference lead Detective Burquez, tells reporters that the police are looking into the matter. After the conference, a disheveled Detective Reese asks to be put on the case, to which Detective Burquez assents. They move to a situation room with a TV and multiple computers going over information from the case. Here we learn that there were four video cameras found at the crime scene and two survivors. They load up the first video camera and begin to watch.

We see a woman practicing lines for a play, then the video jumps to a man playing guitar and a surprise party for the woman celebrating getting a part in a play. This is Leann, and her friend Rachel is behind the camera. The video shows Leann and her boyfriend Tyler at Leann's play, where he proposes; she declines and he walks off stage angry. The video shows the girls making a video to Tyler to apologize for the proposal and to continue with a trip that was previously planned. The three are shown getting onto a shuttle bus heading to Las Vegas, driven by Ben. Along the way we see people being picked up and we meet Vicki, a dancer, and Steven, a 16-year-old runaway.

While watching the video the detectives notice another person on the bus, a woman. Zooming in, they notice that she is carrying a military duffle bag full of money. Focusing on the bag, they get the name Fleishman.

While en route to Las Vegas, some of the passengers notice that they're not on any main roads, but dirt roads. Rachel is asking where they are going when the bus hits something and flips; they find that what they hit was barbed wire. Ben mentions he saw a truck repair shop a few miles back, and the group begin to walk back to the repair shop. At the shop where Ben looks around for a phone, and locates a damaged service phone. Back with the group, he asks Rachel if her camera has a light, since the sun will be going down, and Vicki opens a gift box with a small hand held camera, also with a light. Ben tells the women to gather everyone together. As Rachel goes looking for Leann in one of the buildings, the lights flicker on and Steven stumbles out of a room covered in blood. Chasing after him, the others find Steven and Rachel. Leann believes she sees someone and they all run into one of the buildings.

The video pauses and we watch as the detectives contemplate Steven as the first victim. We also find out about the mystery woman on the bus, Katrina Fleishman. Katrina is married to a military man hospitalized with posttraumatic stress disorder. Katrina withdrew her husband's savings worth $90,000 in cash and left town.

The detectives begin looking at camera number two, from Ben's perspective. He locates a fuse box and is able to get the electricity turned on; the camera shifts to another person in the group. A woman walks towards a bundle of debris, looking for a flare gun, but she is not able to reach it as she is grabbed from behind, and her face is smashed into the debris as she screams and fights; she has her arm burned off by a cutting torch and set on fire.

Detective Reese sees a reflection in a pane of glass when the woman is grabbed. Using a computer to focus, a welding mask can be seen. Detective Burquez makes a connection to Katrina Fleishman's husband, a machinist in the military, and wants his picture publicised. Detective Reese continues to watch the remaining video.

Back to camera one: Rachel is heard crying and everyone is frightened after Steven's death. Moving to one of the empty buildings they calm down, and discuss how to get out of the area. The video jumps to Rachel and Ben going to the bus for tools with Leann and Tyler looking out. Ben looks for tools to help fix the phone they found earlier and finds a flare gun. They hear a noise outside and Ben gets out and is presumably murdered by the killer, who tries to get to Rachel with his welding tool, but she runs back to the repair shop.

Here she learns from Vicki that Leann and Tyler went looking for her and have not returned. Katrina tells the other women "He's here" and Rachel uses her camera's night vision to look outside. They see a person in a welding mask, who shoots the flare gun at them. hitting Katrina in the stomach. All the women run to a nearby building, where they find Leann, she explains that Tyler was taken and she doesn't know what happened to him. Rachel uses her camera's night vision again and sees the flare gun out in the yard. Vicki decides to make a run for the gun, Leann gives Vicki her ring for luck and Vicki leaves to get the gun. They watch as Vicki goes towards the gun but once there they watch as the killer murders Vicki. Leann and Rachel huddle together after watching Vicki die when they hear someone outside the building and Ben stumbles in. Ben was left to die but was able to make it back to the repair shop with the wires needed to fix the phone.

The frame pauses and the technician tells Detective Reese he was able to find footage on Katrina's phone camera, Detective Burquez comes in with the news that Katrina's husband has been located in a Hollywood hotel and is going to be arrested. We then see what is on Katrina's camera.

Katrina, looking in the camera, begins talking about how the police will be scrambling over the scene to find out what is happening. She makes a dying request to be with the one she loves, Gerry Fleishman, her husband, and asks to be buried in the plot next to his. She goes over some of her husband's mental and physical disabilities after he came back from war, about celebrities being famous for no reason, and she speaks of God; the camera then stalls and flickers to a new image of the killer, we watch as Katrina's neck is sliced and she is killed while her camera records.

The detectives receive a call from a police officer in Hollywood, who explains to Detective Burquez that Gerald Fleishman has been dead for approximately a week, having shot himself and left only a note telling Katrina to withdraw their savings and go to Las Vegas to enjoy life. Now without a suspect, they attempt to figure out who the killer might be. On Katrina's phone footage they read something the killer wrote on a mirror, "Fear me like you fear God," and realize that the crime was planned and staged for them to figure out, and that the murderer had killed before. They begin to focus on Ben, the bus driver, since the trip was non-stop and Ben had mentioned a stop while driving down the gravel road. The detectives begin watching Rachel's video again.

We see Ben, Leann and Rachel move to another building, where Katrina is found dead. They move to a barn where Ben barricades the door, but while the women aren't looking, he disappears. Leann is grabbed and pulled from behind by someone unknown, and the camera goes dark as Rachel hides, turns the night vision on and sees Ben come towards her and fall. Taking the wire from him she attempts to re-connect the phone, but the killer appears with the welding torch. As she escapes from the barn it explodes, knocking her down; the killer catches her and sets her on fire with the cutting torch.

The video freezes, as no more footage is left from this camera. Finally, Steven's cell phone camera shows the truck stopping.

Steven begins talking to his mom about running away and scanning the scene in front of him, as he turns he sees Leann turn down Tyler's proposal; as Steven becomes angry and walks out, the video flickers out.

The detectives turn to the technician, who tells them that the memory card in the phone is missing, Detective Reese notices the news on one of the screens and asks for the volume to be raised. The media have gotten the footage from the crime scene and released it to the public. Now they attempt to figure out how the footage was leaked and Burquez is called to her superior's office. Officer Jenson comes in with the background requested on the bus driver Ben, whose real name is William Gentry. It shows he had been convicted of attempting to rob a bank in the past. Reese has an idea while looking at the case photos and leaves to speak with one of the survivors. We watch through the interrogation room camera as Detective Reese begins speaking to Leann.

Detective Reese begins to explain to Leann that Tyler is in the hospital and doctors are caring for him. They begin to discuss grief and Reese tells Leann his history with grief, how his daughter had been abducted and later found murdered. He explains that a serial killer kills for attention and sport; they like to play god. He begs Leann to try to remember the events from the crime. Reese begins to ask about Ben and Leann explains what happened just after Rachel, Ben and herself entered the barn to fix the damaged phone. She tells of being grabbed and later coming to and watching Rachel fight the killer, she was able to crawl out of the building before the explosion, and saw Steven choking on something and covered in his blood. Detective Reese realizes that the time line is mixed up, and tells Leann to go home and rest. At the morgue, Reese asks about the autopsies on the bodies, and specifically about Steven. Steven was still alive before the building exploded and had been dragged to the building to be burned when it exploded. Leann had mentioned him choking on something, and Reese finds the missing memory card lodged in his throat.

The memory cards resolution is degraded but Reese clears the few frames they have and reveals Tyler wearing the welders mask. Detective Burquez releases his identity to the press as the killer.

In the office, Detective Reese continues to watch the video from Rachel's camera, here he notices glitches in the video. While Burquez is speaking at the conference, the reporters begin receiving messages and Burquez is told of a new development. Reese realizes that the videos have been edited for the police to view, with the edits being released to the media. The video now shows Rachel and Leann carefully planning the massacre and framing Tyler for everything. We watch as both women murder each person and stage fake evidence for what they call their "first movie together". The police realize they have been duped and manipulated. In the last scene both women come on screen and tell the camera and audience "Remember the next time someone's filming you, you could be in the sequel."

== Cast ==
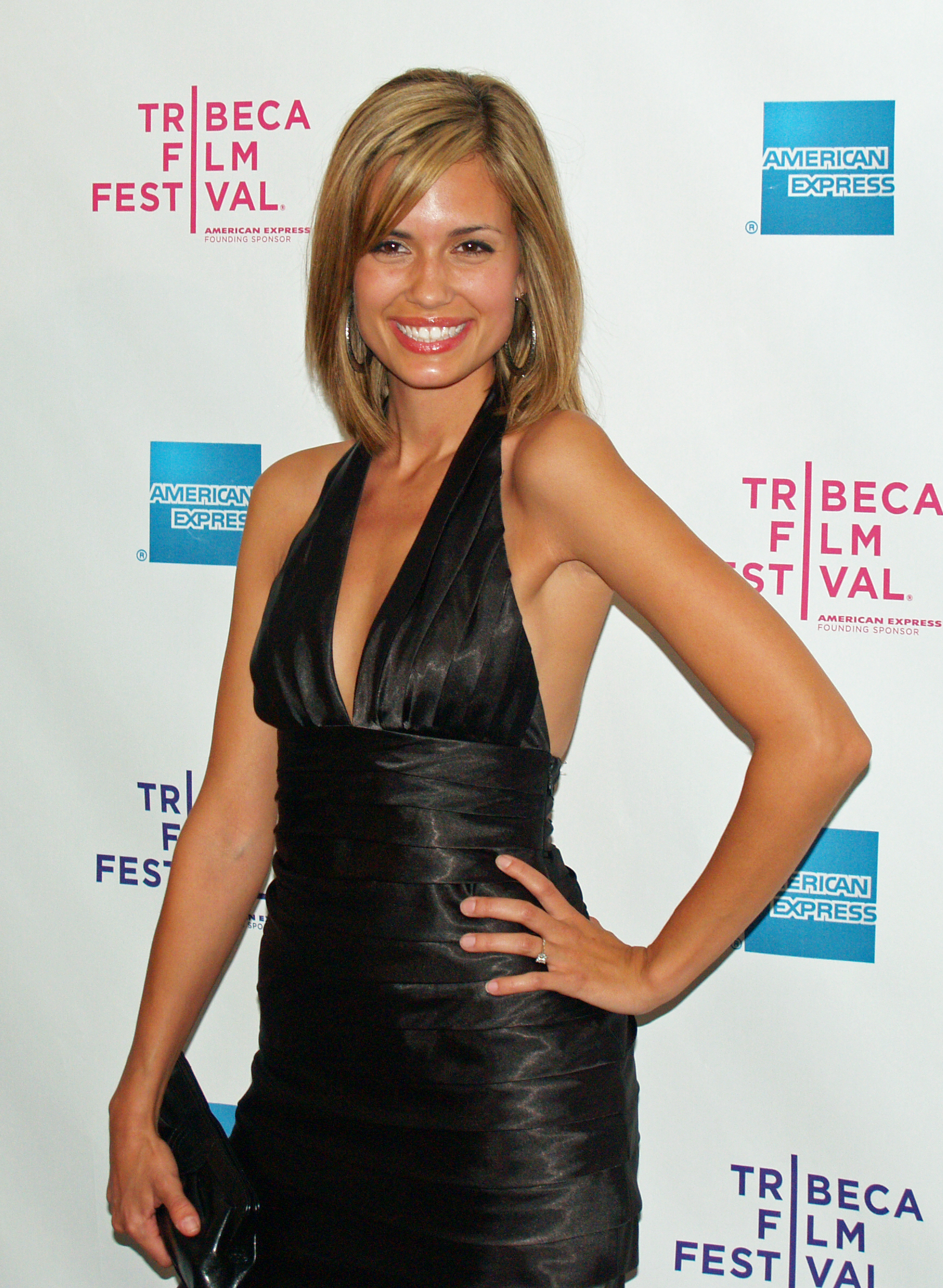
Actress Torrey DeVitto portrayed the lead role of LeAnn Hookplat in the film

- Torrey DeVitto as LeAnn Hookplat
- Caitlin Stasey as Rachel
- Harry Lennix as Ben
- Svetlana Metkina as Vicki
- Dale Dickey as Katrina Fleishman
- Radha Mitchell as Detective Burquez
- Stephen Moyer as Detective Reese
- Aml Ameen as Officer Jensen
- Nolan Gerard Funk as Tyler Morris
- Albert Kuo as Steven

== Reception ==
The film received negative reviews by critics. It holds a 6% approval rating on the review aggregator Rotten Tomatoes, with an average rating of 3.11/10 and 17 counted reviews. Metacritic gave it a score of 14 out of 100 based on reviews from 8 critics, indicating "overwhelming dislike".

Variety magazine called it an "aggressively terrible horror quickie" and "proof that the found-footage horror cycle has finally reached its low ebb".
