= Igor Shavlak =

Soviet-Russian actor, film director, screenwriter and producer

Igor Eduardovich Shavlak (Russian: Игорь Эдуардович Шавлак; born September 12, 1962) is a Soviet and Russian film actor, film director, screenwriter and producer.

== Biography ==
Igor Shavlak was born on September 12, 1962.

In 1983 he graduated from the Boris Shchukin Theatre Institute (Yuri Katin-Yartsev's workshop).

In 1986-1988, together with fellow student Aleksei Sevastyanov, he headed the Sokolniki Theater Studio, which was located in the Rusakov Workers' Club. The popularity of Igor Shavlak was brought about by roles in Russian action films and crime dramas.

In 2007 he shot the horror film Trackman. The film did not pay off at the box office, which is why Shavlak had problems with creditors. Unable to pay off their debts, the director disappeared without a trace, presumably leaving Russia. His whereabouts are currently unknown.

== Selected filmography ==
=== Actor ===
- 1985 — Train Off Schedule as Vlad (voiced by Oleg Menshikov)
- 1985 — The Black Arrow as Richard Shelton
- 1987 — Remember Me Like This as sailor (TV)
- 1990 — The Family of the Vourdalaks as journalist
- 1993 — Breakfast with a View to the Elbrus Mountains as Slava
- 2007 — Trackman as colonel

=== Film director ===
- 1990 — The Family of the Vourdalaks
- 1997 — Hunting Season
- 2007 — Trackman
