= Carl Beukes =

South African actor

- Born: 3 October 1976 (age 49); Johannesburg, South Africa
- Education: The National School of the Arts
- Occupation: Actor
- Years active: 1998–present
- Notable work: Hijack Stories
- Spouse: (m. 2014)

Carl Beukes (born 3 October 1976) is a South African actor best known for his roles as Paul McPherson in Isidingo and as the archangel Gabriel in Dominion. Beukes is a graduate of The National School of the Arts, where he studied Speech & Drama. In addition to his credited film, television, and other screen roles, Beukes has also been in the cast of the stage productions Macbeth, Certified Male, Amadeus, Popcorn, Art, Black Dog, and Tape.

As of 2016, Beukes is working on a leading role in the pilot of an untitled Mars Project Drama for The CW.

== Filmography ==
Year	Title	Role	Type	Notes
1998	If This Be Treason	Anton Niemand	TV movie	
1999	Isidingo: The Need	Paul McPherson	TV series	Series dropped "The Need" from its title in 2001 and now goes by Isidingo.
2000	Hijack Stories	Brixton Cop #2	Film	
2002	Pure Blood	Faan	Film	
2002	Glory Glory	Militia Man	Film	Also marketed as Hooded Angels
2004	The Res	Doug	TV series	
2005	Straight Outta Benoni	Audition Partner	Film	
2007	The Last Rites of Passage	Judd	Short	
2007	Footskating 101	Hunter Nebworth	Film	
2008	Silent Witness	Emil Renseng	TV series	Character's surname is also spelled "Renserg."
2010	Binneland	Dylan Fourie	TV series	Binneland is also known as Binnelanders and Binneland Sub Judice.
2010	Jozi	James	Film	
2011	Wild at Heart	Rick Geldenhuis	TV series	
2012	The Girl	Jim Brown	TV movie	
2012	Dirty Laundry	Marc	Short	
2013	Shotgun Garfunkel	Brandon	Film	
2013	Stealing Time	Nathan Ross	Film	
2013	Mandela: Long Walk to Freedom	Niel Barnard	Film	
2013	Previously on Children's Hospital Africa		Short	
2013	Safari	Andrew Heerden	Film	
2014	Dominion	Gabriel	TV series	
2014	Kite	Vic Thornhill	Film	
2014	Homeland	Clark Russel	TV series	
2015	Eye in the Sky	Sgt. Mike Gleeson	Film	
2020	NCIS: Los Angeles	Akhos Laos, season 11 episode 10	TV series	

== Personal life ==
Beukes married in November 2014 and had his honeymoon in Zanzibar. In 2003, he moved to London and lived there for sixteen months before returning to South Africa in September 2004. Beukes has stated that his favorite stage work was in Certified Male, Macbeth and Art.

Commenting on his future plans: "My ideal goal would be to have a balance of homegrown and international work. I have always, since I was a kid, wanted to work with the big boys. I would love to make some American movies and get into that industry. At the moment, I have a foot in the door and I am starting to do that. I need to ride this wave while it is going. I want to come back and do more film. The South African film industry is budding and I don’t want to not be a part of it. It’s been my bread and butter all my life.”
