= Mini's First Time =

- US movie poster
- Directed by: Nick Guthe
- Written by: Nick Guthe
- Produced by: Kevin Spacey; Dana Brunetti; Evan Astrowsky; Edward Bass
- Starring: Alec Baldwin; Nikki Reed; Luke Wilson; Carrie-Anne Moss; Jeff Goldblum
- Music by: Cato
- Distributed by: Bold Films; HBO Films
- Release dates: May 1, 2006 (Tribeca); July 14, 2006 (United States)
- Running time: 91 minutes
- Country: United States
- Language: English
- Box office: $156,318

Mini's First Time is a 2006 satiric neo-noir black comedy film written and directed by Nick Guthe and produced by Trigger Street Productions. It was screened at the Tribeca Film Festival on May 1, 2006, and had a limited release on July 14, 2006. It was released on DVD on October 24, 2006 by HBO Films.

== Plot ==
Mini Drogues is a clever and adventurous high school senior who is bored with her life. She prizes her "unique experiences" (she calls them "firsts").

For excitement, and to add to her list of firsts, Mini decides to try being a call girl. Her first client, however, has a guilty conscience and cannot go through with the act, which disappoints Mini. Her second client is decidedly more exciting: her stepfather Martin. Martin is initially shocked when he learns of her identity (he initially blindfolded himself during intercourse per Mini's request), but soon a torrid love affair blossoms between them.

In order to be together, Mini and Martin concoct a plan to have her mother Diane declared insane. When their plan fails, she convinces him to murder Diane, despite his initial resistance to the idea. They attempt to make it appear that Diane committed suicide, but they soon attract the attention of a detective who believes that Mini and Martin killed her.

A nosy neighbor, Mike, is sexually obsessed with Mini, and when Martin learns that she has gone to Mike's house and received sexual pictures from him, he and Mike get into a fight. Mini arrives to find Martin standing over the neighbor, ready to beat him into unconsciousness, and when the police arrive they arrest Martin.

Mini visits Martin in jail and admits that the sexual pictures sent were actually from her in order to get him to think that the neighbor sent them. She also reveals that she assumed the police would eventually believe he killed Diane (since he was the more likely perpetrator). Mini, therefore, ends up getting away with murder, and inherits her mother's fortune.

The film ends with Mini giving the valedictorian speech, even though she is a C student; the school gave her straight A's out of sympathy for her mother's death. She offers advice to the graduating class about how to live a good life, that perversely alludes to her crimes without making her look too suspicious. The detective is present, clearly still suspicious of Mini, but knowing that he will probably never be able to prove that she was guilty of murdering her mother.

== Cast ==
- Alec Baldwin as Martin Tannen
- Nikki Reed as Minerva "Mini" Drogues
- Carrie-Anne Moss as Diane Drogues-Tannen
- Jeff Goldblum as Mike Rudell
- Luke Wilson as Det. Dwight Garson
- Svetlana Metkina as Jelena Mariskova-Flachsman
- David Andriole as Charles Mather
- Mark Deklin as Ian Boyd
- Sprague Grayden as Kayla
- Rick Fox as Fabrizio
- Joel McHale as Host

== Reception ==
On the review aggregator website Rotten Tomatoes, 50% of 24 critics' reviews are positive, with an average rating of 5.6/10. The website's consensus reads: "This black comedy wavers between sleaze and satire, without ever fully committing to either." Metacritic, which uses a weighted average, assigned the film a score of 45 out of 100, based on 10 critics, indicating "mixed or average" reviews.
