= Trackman (film) =

- Directed by: Igor Shavlak
- Written by: Valery Krechetov; Viktor Sorokin
- Produced by: Michael Schlicht; Paul Heth; Valery Krechetov
- Starring: Dmitri Orlov; Svetlana Metkina; Aleksandr Vysokovsky; Yuliya Mikhailova; Aleksei Dmitriyev; Oleg Kamenshchikov; Tomas Motskus
- Cinematography: Ilia Boyko
- Music by: Lev Zemlinskiy
- Production companies: Importfilm; Monumental Pictures
- Distributed by: 20th Century Fox; Monumental Pictures (Russia)
- Release date: 2007
- Running time: 95 minutes
- Country: Russia
- Language: Russian

Trackman (Russian: Путевой обходчик, romanized: Putevoy obkhodchik) is a 2007 Russian slasher film directed by Igor Shavlak.

== Plot ==
Three men decide to rob a bank, having devised a plan of retreat across the abandoned tracks of a no-longer used section of the Moscow Metro. The group is led by former infantryman Grom. However, the heist spirals out of control and the raiders are forced to take hostages. They hide in the tunnels of subway with the hostages. They soon come at the mercy of the Trackman. The Trackman is a giant, who had been living in the Metro's catacombs for years. The group is methodically picked off by the Trackman, who gouges out their eyes. Grom is forced to accept that he must confront him in a game of survival, in which there can be only one winner.

== Cast ==
- Dmitri Orlov as Grom
- Svetlana Metkina as Katya
- Aleksandr Vysokovsky as Pakhomov
- Yuliya Mikhailova as Olga
- Aleksei Dmitriyev as Trackman
- Oleg Kamenshchikov as Irkut
- Tomas Motskus as Kostya
- Igor Shavlak as Colonel

== Release ==
=== Home media ===
The film was released on DVD in Canada by Maple Pictures and in the United States by Lionsgate Home Entertainment on October 14, 2008. The latter being released as a part of the company's eight-disk "Ghost House Underground Eight Film Collection".

== Reception ==
Dread Central gave the film a score of 1.5 out of 5, calling it "[an] uninteresting slasher movie". Andrew Smith from Popcorn Pictures awarded the film a score of 4/10, writing, "There’s nothing overly wrong with Trackman and it’s not a complete dud but given its Russian origins, I was expecting a lot more than another derivative slasher. It’s got the atmosphere and it’s got the killer but it’s a chore to sit through and comes off feeling really lethargic, tired and uninspired." Justin Felix from DVD Talk felt the film was a fairly standard slasher film and stated that the film wasn't memorable enough to warrant multiple viewings. Adam Hakari from ReelTalk Movie Reviews awarded the film 1.5 out of 4 stars, criticizing the film's "sluggish pacing", and lack of visual flair.
