= Dominion (TV series) =

American apocalyptic fantasy TV series

- Genre: Apocalyptic fiction; Fantasy; Action
- Created by: Vaun Wilmott
- Based on: Legion by Peter Schink; Scott Stewart
- Starring: Christopher Egan; Tom Wisdom; Roxanne McKee; Luke Allen-Gale; Shivani Ghai; Rosalind Halstead; Anthony Head; Alan Dale; Carl Beukes; Kim Engelbrecht
- Country of origin: United States
- Original language: English
- No. of seasons: 2
- No. of episodes: 21

Production
- Executive producers: David Lancaster; Michel Litvack; Tom Lieber; Todd Slavkin; Darren Swimmer; Scott Stewart; Vaun Wilmott
- Production locations: Cape Town, South Africa
- Running time: 42 minutes
- Production companies: Bold Films; Sony Pictures Television; Universal Cable Productions

Original release
- Network: Syfy
- Release: June 19, 2014 – October 1, 2015

Dominion is an American apocalyptic fantasy television series created by Vaun Wilmott. It is a sequel to the 2010 film Legion, written by Peter Schink and Scott Stewart. In December 2013, Syfy ordered a pilot episode and the series premiered on the cable television network Syfy on June 19, 2014. The show was filmed in Cape Town, South Africa. Stewart served as series executive producer, as well as director of the pilot episode, written by Wilmott. In the series, angels are in combat with humankind, which fights back from a reduced civilization.

It was renewed for a 13-episode second season on September 25, 2014, which premiered on July 9, 2015, and concluded on October 1, 2015. On October 13, 2015, Syfy cancelled Dominion after two seasons.

== Synopsis ==
God vanishes and in his absence the archangel Gabriel and his army of lower angels wage war against humankind, believing them to be the cause of God's absence. Although most higher angels remain neutral, Gabriel has convinced the lower angels, the "dogs of Heaven," called "eight-balls" by humans for their black eyes, to fight alongside him. Twenty-five years later, humankind survives in a few fortified cities. The archangel Michael has chosen to side with humanity against Gabriel, living among humans in the fortified city of Vega (once Las Vegas) until the time a prophesied savior appears to save humankind.

== Cast ==
=== Main ===
- Christopher Egan as Sgt. 1st Class Alex Lannon: A young and often rebellious V2 soldier in Vega's Archangel Corps. Lannon discovers he is the unlikely savior of humanity, known as the "Chosen One", and the central figure of Vega's dominant official religion, known as "Saviorism".
- Tom Wisdom as Archangel Michael: A legendary warrior known throughout history as the greatest of the archangels. Michael was the only angel to take humanity's side during the Extermination War, turning against his own kind, and was instrumental in defeating his brother Gabriel and saving what was left of humankind. He is Vega's protector and commander of the Archangel Corps.
- Roxanne McKee as Lady Claire Riesen: A teacher to orphan children, believer in Saviorism, and Alex's lover. Originally Vega's princess and heir to her father's seat, Claire later ascends as ruler of Vega as Lady of the City.
- Luke Allen-Gale as William Whele: Vega's Principate, the religious leader of the Church of the Savior, the religion that has grown since the Extermination War, all based around the concept of the Chosen One. William is secretly loyal to Gabriel and leader of his Black Acolytes in Vega.
- Shivaani Ghai as Arika/Evelyn: The Queen of Helena, a distant and mysterious fortified city. Evelyn originally came to Vega as "Arika", supposedly the consort and wife of Queen Evelyn and a diplomat who is part of a negotiating party. Evelyn's true agendas are deceptive, secretive, and mysterious to the residents of Vega. Evelyn acts to maintain the peace between Vega and Helena, maneuvering throughout Vega's leadership with grace and skill.
- Rosalind Halstead as Senator Becca Thorn (season 1): One of the Senate's consuls, the head of House Thorn, and Riesen's confidant. Becca is one of the most powerful leaders in Vega, overseeing all scientific and medical personnel in the city.
- Anthony Head as Senator David Whele: Vega's Secretary of Commerce, one of the Senate's consuls, the head of House Whele, and William's father. David is the chief of administrator of Vega and the second-most powerful leader in the city, responsible for keeping every government department running, while the Lord commands the military. A ruthless and cunning political operator, David is an ambitious power broker, and an utterly ruthless and narcissistic politician, who is always on the hunt to keep or grow his power by any means necessary. Before the war, David was a devotedly faithful televangelist, but he lost his faith when the angels descended from Heaven and his family was killed by the Possessed.
- Alan Dale as Gen. Edward Riesen: Vega's Lord of the City, the head of House Riesen, and Claire's father. Riesen is Vega's selfless ruler and military leader, who remains a paragon of strength and duty, despite his failing health. Before the war, Riesen was a civilian accountant who studied military history; during the opening hours of the Extermination War, he took a dead general's uniform and name, later leading humanity to victory.
- Carl Beukes as Archangel Gabriel (recurring season 1; main cast season 2): An archangel and enemy of humankind, Michael's "twin" (in the hierarchy of angels), and the unstable but masterfully manipulative leader of the angels in the war against humanity. Gabriel is responsible for pushing humanity to the brink of extinction after God's disappearance; his aim is to exterminate humankind, believing this will bring God back.
- Kim Engelbrecht as Sgt. Noma Banks (recurring season 1; main cast season 2): A sergeant in Vega's Archangel Corps, and Alex's friend and fellow soldier, who maintains a casual sexual relationship with him. Noma is secretly a higher angel loyal to Michael, assigned by him to watch over Alex. She is revealed later in season two to be a follower of Lucifer.

=== Supporting ===
==== Season one ====
- Langley Kirkwood as Jeep Hanson, Alex's adoptive father and Charlie's husband (from Legion), Jeep was a hero of Vega long presumed dead in the Extermination War, and known publicly as Vega's "prophet" for the Chosen One.
- Jonathan Howard as Sgt. Ethan Mack: A sergeant in Vega's Archangel Corps, he works as a guard for House Whele, and is Noma and Alex's best friend and fellow soldier.
- Betsy Wilke as Bixby: A young V1 orphan, Bixby barely eked out an existence in Vega, but was then granted the protection of House Riesen, and a greatly improved standard of living.
- Anton David Jeftha as Furiad: One of the higher angels who have joined Gabriel in his war against humanity, Furiad is Noma's former lover and leader of Gabriel's High Guards.
- Katrine De Candole as Archangel Uriel: An archangel, Michael and Gabriel's sister and Raphael's "twin" (in the hierarchy of angels), Uriel resurfaces after years under ground, a new player of uncertain intentions and loyalties. Her sly, scheming tendencies make her a bit of a loose cannon, and both of her brothers call her insane.
- Kevin Otto as Louis: A neutral higher angel and a refugee from the Extermination War, Louis was a mild-mannered grocer living and working in Vega as a vendor in the marketplace.
- Amy Bailey as Clementine Riesen: Edward Riesen's wife and Claire's mother. Clementine is now one of the Possessed angels, kept by Riesen living at the abandoned Luxor hotel. She retained enough of her human memories to maintain a clandestine relation with Riesen, although it was entirely forbidden and put her at extreme risk, as she would be condemned by both her own kind and the humans of Vega.
- Tyrone Keogh as Lt. Vince: A security guard for House Whele.
- Kenneth Fok as Capt. Finch: A captain in Vega's Archangel Corps, and Alex, Noma, and Ethan's firm and unforgiving superior officer.
- Danny Keogh as Senator Thomas Frost: One of Vega's senators, Frost is a leader of Vega and is responsible for the city’s "Agritowers", in which much of the food is grown. One of the city's founding fathers, Frost is a powerful believer in the coming of the Chosen One, and is an honest politician allied with Riesen and Michael against David Whele, valuing the truth above all else.
- Fiona Ramsay as Senator Blanch Romero: One of Vega's senators, Romero is one of the leaders of Vega and is responsible for the vitally important nuclear reactor that powers the city. A shrewd politician, Romero has aligned herself with David Whele and against Riesen (when the political winds dictate it).
- Luam Staples as Roan: Originally appearing as a mysterious child savant, Roan accompanied Arika and her retinue of women from Helena to Vega. Favored by Evelyn, the leader of Helena, the silent boy was suspected to be far more than he seemed. Roan is revealed to be one of the higher angels who have joined Gabriel in his war against humanity.
- Julie Hartley as Felicia Aldreen: Claire's servant at House Riesen, Felicia was originally a neutral higher angel and a refugee from the Extermination War, though she later sided secretly with Gabriel.

==== Season two ====
- Nicholas Bishop as Gates Foley: A brilliant but troubled military genius, he helped build Vega into the stronghold it has become. Gates is an engineer and an old friend of Riesen's, harbors romantic desires for Claire, and maintains the systems that power the city. He is an MIT alumnus and a die-hard Boston Red Sox fan, using the 2004 ALCS as encouragement to solve complex problems.
- Simon Merrells as Julian: The cunning and powerful leader of New Delphi, Julian is a cryptic man with motives as questionable as his past, and will go to any lengths to protect his city. Julian is later revealed as a Dyad - a symbiosis between a human and a higher angel, controlled by the spirit of Lyrae, a higher angel killed by Michael centuries ago for horrific atrocities against humans during the siege of Sodom and Gomorrah, and his spirit was banished to become a hybrid.
- Christina Chong as Zoe Holloway: A member of Vega’s Archangel Corps who deserted her position, she is unable to tolerate guarding V6s. Zoe is bold, fierce, and scrappy, and joins the V1 rebel faction to overthrow Claire's government.
- Olivia Mace as Laurel: The steadfast leader of Mallory, Alabama, a small Southern town of survivors who have inexplicably managed to insulate themselves from the fallout of the Extermination War. Laurel is deeply devoted to her religious faith and is unwavering in her resolve. Unknown to her, her town was saved by Lucifer, who is using them to return.
- Luke Tyler as Pete: An energetic, bright, dynamic, and eternally optimistic teenager, he who grew up in Missouri before the apocalypse. Pete was a Possessed angel, until Alex performed an eviction that restored his humanity. He wakes up on the road in the battle-torn world, with no memories of his possession, but retaining his peaceful past. He is later repossessed by the same lesser angel.
- Diarmaid Murtagh as Wes Fuller: A resident of Mallory, he is loyal to Laurel and distrustful of Michael.
- Hakeem Kae-Kazim as the Prophet: A mysterious figure who appears to Noma in the woods, his image appears in the church at Mallory, and he has the power to set the Possessed on fire with a gesture, consuming them from within. He is later revealed to be working with Lucifer and trying to bring him back to life.
- Reine Swart as Charlie: Alex's mother, killed by Noma while protecting Alex as a baby.

== Episodes ==
Season	Episodes	Originally released	
Season	Episodes	First released	Last released
1	8	June 19, 2014	August 7, 2014
2	13	July 9, 2015	October 1, 2015

=== Season 1 (2014) ===
No. overall	No. in season	Title	Directed by	Written by	Original release date	US viewers (millions)
1	1	"Pilot"	Scott Stewart	Vaun Wilmott	June 19, 2014	1.96
In the outskirts of Vega, Alex searches for "8-balls", humans possessed by angels and led by the Archangel Gabriel. Alex finds three in an abandoned casino, and fights them, but back in Vega, Archangel Michael reprimands Alex for going on an unauthorized mission. Alex visits General Riesen's daughter, Claire, his secret lover, and they discuss fleeing Vega, but she insists that her father will let them be together. Jeep, a warrior who has been missing for over a decade, is unable to decipher his mystical tattoos, and Jeep reveals that he is Alex's father. Gabriel is alive, and he sends angels from his headquarters to fight those in Vega. Jeep gets stabbed by an 8-ball and dies in Alex's arms. Jeep's tattoos fade and then reappear on Alex. Michael tells Alex that he is the savior of Vega and that he must decipher the tattoos and use them to choose which course to take at critical junctures to end the war. Alex sees that a section of the tattoos has temporarily changed to read "Beware of those closest to you".
2	2	"Godspeed"	Rick Jacobson	Vaun Wilmott	June 26, 2014	1.45
Alex mourns the loss of his father and wrestles with the idea of being the Chosen One. He tells Claire that they should leave the city, but she wishes to stay and help defend it. Gabriel and Michael meet and discuss why the angels attacked; angels were upset that God gave humans their form and the Earth to be theirs. Alex's new assignment is to protect the House of Whele. He reveals to Michael that the tattoos told him to stay away. Arika, being held a prisoner, blackmails David for her freedom or there will be war. General Riesen is shown to have congestive heart failure, and he wishes to hand control of the city over to Claire. After her maid, Felicia, sees Alex's tattoos, she is revealed to be an angel and attacks him. Claire is injured, and Alex kicks Felicia out of a window. She flies away. He decides that the best way to protect Claire is to leave the city. Felicia returns to Gabriel with the identity of the Chosen One.
3	3	"Broken Places"	Rick Jacobson	Dario Scardapane and Damien Ober	July 3, 2014	1.69
William meets Gabriel to learn he must now help the angel army, to which William hesitantly agrees. Arika meets David to talk about their mutual needs. He wants an air force and she wants his nuclear reactor technology to take back to Helena. Out in the desert, Alex learns angels have been attacking out of nowhere from the sky. Claire and her father argue that the system he created is actually enslaving people and creating a dangerous social order. David Whele corners Becca to say he wants her to study Michael. He reminds her that sleeping with an angel makes her a pariah, and recommends that Becca start autopsies on higher angels. Alex is very resistant to being the Chosen One. Michael say he will leave him alone if he goes to one more location – Alex's childhood home. William tells his followers that it is time they start worshiping Gabriel and not Michael. Michael and Alex are attacked by Gabriel's disciples. Furiad tells Gabriel that he stabbed Michael, which angers Gabriel, who still hopes he can recruit his brother angel.
4	4	"The Flood"	Alex Holmes	Brusta Brown & John Mitchell Todd	July 10, 2014	1.62
Alex is dragged to Vega's prison, and gets thrown into solitary confinement. While Michael and Becca are sleeping, a woman sneaks in and it is revealed she is Michael and Gabriel's sister, Uriel. Alex tries to convince Claire that it's probably best he stay in prison, but she frees him from jail. Alex visits Bixby, who tells him that her getting hurt is not his fault. David and General Riesen are summoned to Vega's agriculture center, where Senator Frost reveals a device that could flood the building killing the food supply and the three of them in the process. With David and Riesen missing, Becca appoints Claire the Lady of the City. Uriel tells Michael that if he teaches Alex how to decipher the tattoos, she will join him in the battle against Gabriel. Noma and Ethan tell Alex that all Frost wants is to meet the Chosen One. When Frost asks for real proof, Alex says "she died for you". He surrenders, but General Riesen shoots Frost. David visits Bixby in the hospital and turns up her intake of morphine, killing her.
5	5	"Something Borrowed"	Alex Holmes	Rebecca Kirsch	July 17, 2014	1.58
Michael trains Alex in the desert to better fight angels. Michael mentions Bixby's death, forcing Alex to use his anger. Claire confirms to Alex that she's marrying William for the city's sake. Clementine secretly goes into the city, where she buys a music box. She kills the store clerk when he realizes she's an 8-ball. Alex vows to find the killer, as he believes it's still within the city walls. Claire asks William to stop his father, and he promises that he will ask David to back off. William visits his father, then remembers and tries to discard the scarf with eyes drawn on it. His attempts to destroy it prove futile, so he hides it in a nearby desk drawer. At the engagement party, Claire finds the eye-painted scarf. She mistakenly confronts David for working for Gabriel with the scarf, promising to out him as such if he attempts to depose her father. At the party, she gives a speech about missing her mother, who is revealed to be Clementine.
6	6	"Black Eyes Blue"	Larry Shaw	Todd Harthan	July 24, 2014	1.54
Alex and Michael go to the vault where Clementine is, and Alex reveals a plan to perform an eviction of the angel possessing her. David reveals to William that the handkerchief was found in the house. Michael visits Uriel and tries to exchange a small Vermeer painting for a book called the Apocrypha, which helps evict angels from 8-balls, returning them to their human state. Uriel declines the offer, but hands the book over to him when he agrees to let her look at his tattoos. Alex takes Claire to meet with Clementine, and tells her that her mother is alive inside her possessed body. After a powerful incantation from the Apocrypha, the 8-ball leaves Clementine's body. In icy fury, Claire later confronts her father for keeping Clementine a secret. Finding the Black Acolytes murdered, William reveals to his father that he was their leader. After, William holds a ceremony with his few remaining followers, during which he tortures his father, crushing his ribs.
7	7	"Ouroboros"	Larry Shaw	Bryan Q. Miller	July 31, 2014	1.49
Michael and Alex try to evict the angel from an 8-ball, so Alex can master evictions. He ends up having to kill the 8-ball. Meanwhile, Claire and William discuss moving up the wedding date. In the infirmary, Gabriel pretends to be Louis, a neutral higher angel, and tries to convert a few of the male nurses. They were other higher angels living quietly in the city like Louis until Gabriel found them. Becca confronts Michael to see if he knew other angels were in the city. David recovers, only to be apprehended by a guard. Noma confronts Alex, who admits to having doubts about Michael. Gabriel summons Alex to Michael's lair, and Alex is upset that Michael did not tell him Noma was an angel. Alex performs an eviction and pushes Gabriel out, and Gabriel comes back to his lair to find Uriel. Michael and Alex inspect the bodies of the dead angels that tried to flee the city. In a flashback to the Babylonian desert, Michael slaughters humans until Gabriel and Uriel show up to stop him.
8	8	"Beware Those Closest to You"	Allan Kroeker	Part I: Todd Slavkin and Darren Swimmer; Part II: Vaun Wilmott	August 7, 2014	1.54
Michael and Alex prepare to unseat Gabriel and put an end to the war. Claire and William marry. Michael confesses to Alex that he murdered humans, only stopping when Gabriel and Uriel beat him. Back at the Riesen compound, Claire meets Uriel, who confirms that Claire is pregnant with The Chosen One's baby. Uriel's plan is to translate the markings on Alex's body, use the knowledge to defeat Michael and Gabriel, and end the fighting. Gabriel knows that it is a trap and shows up at the gates of Vega to surrender. Michael and Alex arrive; Claire forbids them from talking to Gabriel, but they do anyway. Gabriel convinces Michael to hate humans again, before escaping. Gabriel tells Alex that the only way to end the war is by them working together. Claire then realizes William is an acolyte for Gabriel. David drives William to the desert, and drops him off with a pack full of supplies. In Vega, Claire reads a letter from Alex, as he climbs the rocks to Gabriel's temple.

=== Season 2 (2015) ===
No. overall	No. in season	Title	Directed by	Written by	Original release date	US viewers (millions)
9	1	"Heirs of Salvation"	Deran Sarafian	Vaun Wilmott	July 9, 2015	1.06
10	2	"Mouth of the Damned"	Deran Sarafian	Todd Harthan	July 16, 2015	1.02
11	3	"The Narrow Gate"	Oz Scott	Rebecca Kirsch	July 23, 2015	0.98
12	4	"A Bitter Truth"	Oz Scott	Alyssa Clark & Sean Crouch	July 30, 2015	1.05
13	5	"Son of the Fallen"	Robert Mandel	Marc Halsey	August 6, 2015	0.94
14	6	"Reap the Whirlwind"	Robert Mandel	Rebecca Kirsch	August 13, 2015	0.92
15	7	"Lay Thee Before Kings"	Jeff Renfroe	Vaun Wilmott	August 20, 2015	0.84
16	8	"The Longest Mile Home"	Jeff Renfroe	Harley Peyton & Jerry Shandy	August 27, 2015	0.75
17	9	"The Seed of Evil"	Millicent Shelton	Alyssa Clark & Sean Crouch	September 3, 2015	0.77
18	10	"House of Sacrifice"	Millicent Shelton	Marc Halsey	September 10, 2015	0.84
19	11	"Bewilderment of Heart"	Gregg Simon	Katie Gruel & Rebecca Kirsch	September 17, 2015	0.64
20	12	"Day of Wrath"	Deran Sarafian	Todd Harthan	September 24, 2015	0.77
21	13	"Sine Deo Nihil"	Deran Sarafian	Vaun Wilmott	October 1, 2015	0.72

== Reception ==
Dominion has been met with mixed reviews. On Metacritic, the first season holds a score of 47 out of 100, based on 13 critics, indicating "mixed or average" reviews. On Rotten Tomatoes, the first season holds a rating of 74%.
