= Vera Sotnikova =

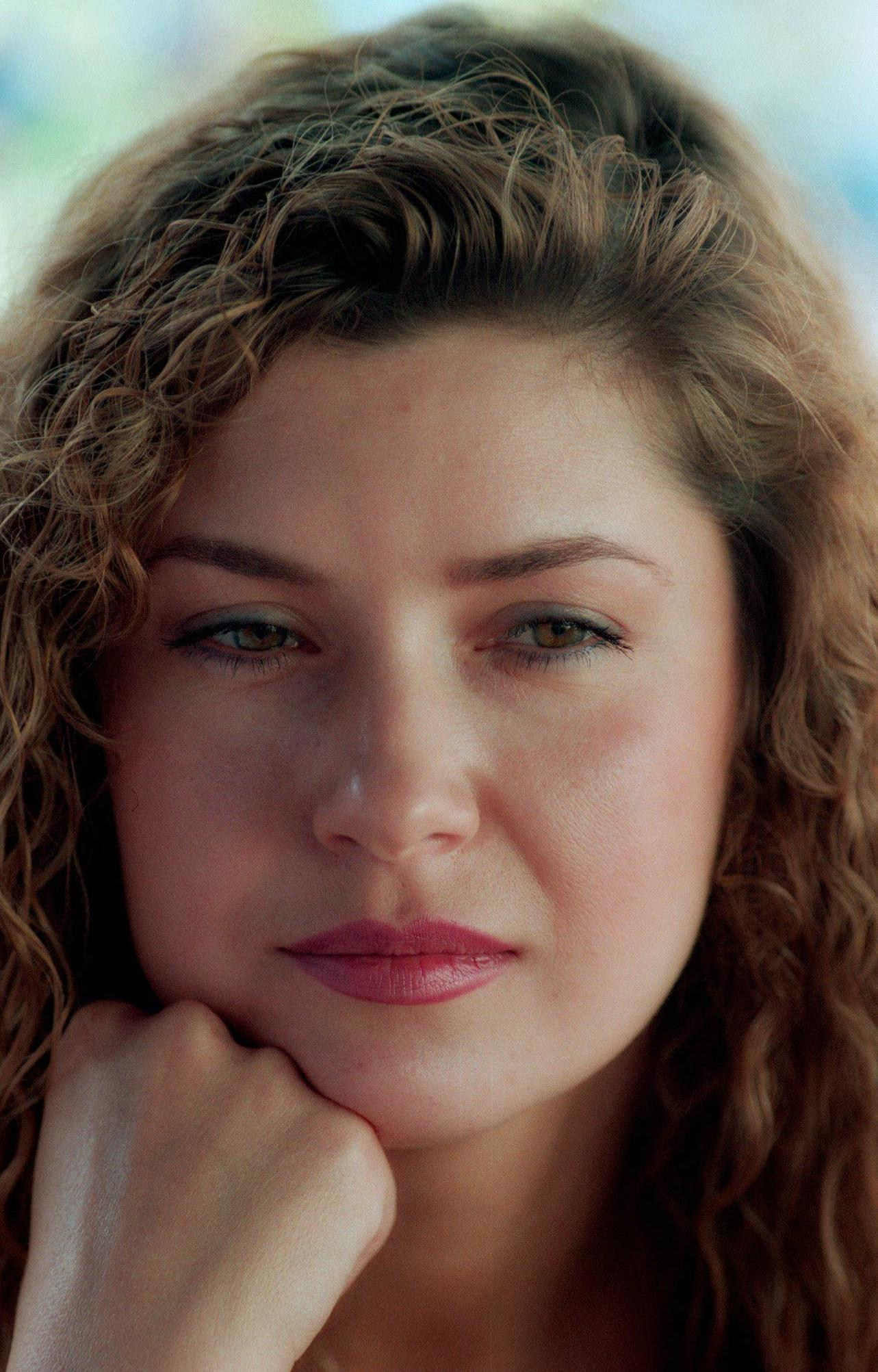
- Vera Sotnikova, 1998
- Born: Vera Mikhailovna Sotnikova; July 19, 1960; Stalingrad, Russian SFSR, Soviet Union
- Occupations: Actress, television
- Years active: 1983-present

Vera Mikhailovna Sotnikova (Russian: Вера Михайловна Сотникова, born July 19, 1960) is a Soviet and Russian theater and film actress, TV presenter. Her screen credit include 'Courier', 'Gu-ga', 'Queen Margot', 'Lyudmila', 'A new Life of Masha Solenova' and 'The Eighth District'.

== Biography ==
Sotnikova graduated from Moscow Theater Actor's School under Oleg Yefremov.

After graduating from the Moscow Art Theatre School in 1982, Sotnikova started working as an actress in Moscow Theatre on Malaya Bronnaya from 1984 to 1987, later joining Anatoly Vasiliev's School of Dramatic Art. From 1991 to 1993, she performed at the Mossovet Theatre, and from 1995 to 2004 she worked at the Chekhov Moscow Art Theatre, where her productions included 'Three Sisters', 'Hoffmann', Uncle Vanya', and 'Antigone'.

Sotnikova also directed five music videos for singer Vladimir Kuzmin.

Sotnikova began appearing in films in 1983, with early screen roles including Priznat vinovnym, The Most Charming and Attractive, State Border, and Gu-ga. She later appeared in films and television series including Queen Margot, Lyudmila, A new Life of Masha Solenova, and The Eighth District.

As a Television presenter, Sotnikova appeared on several TNT projects, including 'Club of Former Wives' and the Russian paranormal competition series 'Battle of the Psychics'.

In 2013, Sotnikova played Lyudmila Zykina in the biographical television series Lyudmila.

== Awards and nominations ==
1992 -- Prize for Best Supporting Actress at the Thessaloniki Film Festival for 'Byron'.

2010 -- Special Golden Crane prize at the Amur Autumn festival for the play.

2013 -- Nominated for the Golden Eagle Award for Best Actress on Television for 'Lyudmila'.

== Filmography ==
- The Most Charming and Attractive (1985) as Smirnov's girlfriend
- Courier (1986) as Natasha
- The End of Eternity (Конец Вечности) (1987) as Noÿs Lambent
- The Battle of the Three Kings (1990) as Rubina
- The Alaska Kid (1991) as Gina
- Breakfast with a View to the Elbrus Mountains (1992)
- Chivalric Romance (2000) as Countess Brigitta
- Words and Music (2004) as Margo
- Lyudmila (2013) as Lyudmila Zykina
- A New Life of Masha Solenova (2020) as Margarita Petrovna
- The Eighth District (2022) as Nadezhda Sergeevna
