= Scott Stewart (director) =

American film director

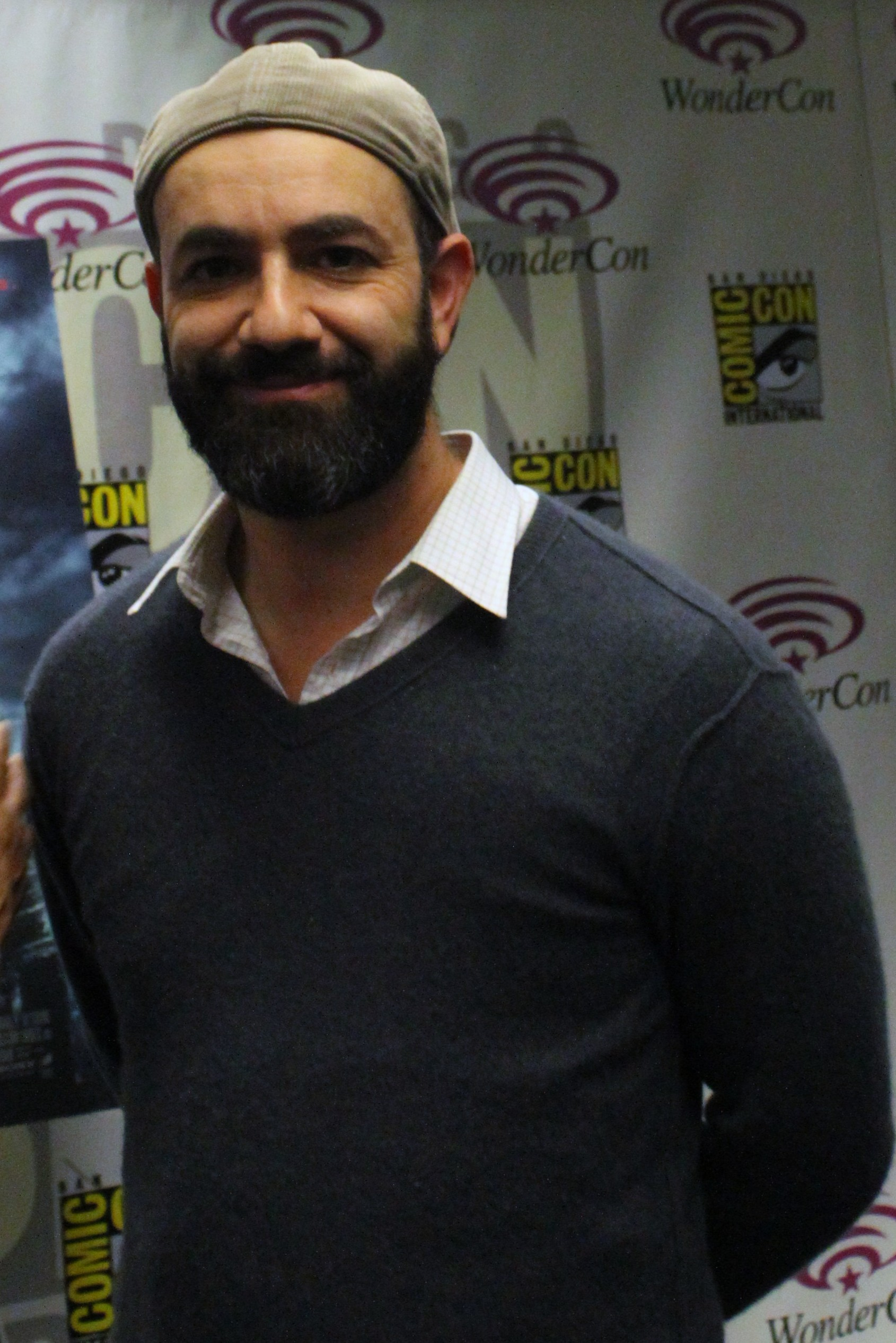
- Stewart at WonderCon 2011
- Born: United States
- Occupations: Film director, screenwriter, producer

Scott Charles Stewart is an American film director, writer, producer and visual effects artist. He was one of the principal co-founders of The Orphanage, a prolific Los Angeles effects house that worked on dozens of high-profile projects. He directed the dark fantasy action-horror films Legion and Priest, and the alien abduction thriller Dark Skies. He also executive produced the television series Dominion, a sequel to the former film. Stewart has also directed, produced, and realized dozens of short films and television commercials.

== Biography ==
Stewart was a senior staffer at the visual effects company The Orphanage. Stewart directed and wrote the apocalyptic thriller Legion. He directed the vampire-western horror film Priest. Stewart was raised Jewish.

== Associations ==
He has used actor Paul Bettany in the lead role on his first two directed features, Legion and Priest.

== Filmography ==
Director

Year	Title				
Year	Title	Director	Writer	Executive Producer	Notes
2000	What We Talk About When We Talk About Love	Yes	Yes	Yes	Based on the short story of the same name by Raymond Carver
2010	Legion	Yes	Yes	Yes	
2011	Priest	Yes	No	No	
2013	Dark Skies	Yes	Yes	No	
2014	Dominion	Yes	No	No	Episode "Pilot"
2016	Holidays	Yes	Yes	No	Segment Christmas

Producer

Year	Title	Notes
2000	G.	Associate producer
2000	Falling	
2000	The Upgrade	
2001	Ten Tiny Love Stories	Associate producer
2001	Sweet	Executive producer
2001	BigLove	Executive producer
2025	True Haunting	Executive producer

Visual effects

- Mars Attacks! (1996)
- The Lost World: Jurassic Park (1997)
- Mercury Rising (1998)
- The Last Birthday Card (2000)
- Harry Potter and the Goblet of Fire (2005)
- Sin City (2005)
- Night at the Museum (2006)
- Pirates of the Caribbean: Dead Man's Chest (2006)
- Superman Returns (2006)
- The Host (2006)
- Live Free or Die Hard (2007)
- Pirates of the Caribbean: At World's End (2007)
- Grindhouse (2007)
- Red Cliff (2008)
- You Don't Mess with the Zohan (2008)
- Iron Man (2008)
