= Stu Maschwitz =

American film director

Stuart T. Maschwitz, commonly known as Stu Maschwitz, was the co-founder and chief technology officer of The Orphanage, a visual effects company that was based in California. He has worked as senior visual effects supervisor on several films. He previously worked at Industrial Light and Magic.

Maschwitz was writer, director, cinematographer, and editor for the film The Last Birthday Card (2000). He directed the "Song For The Lonely" Cher video in 2001 as seen in The Very Best of Cher: The Video Hits Collection. His film Skate Warrior is an example of guerrilla filmmaking. He studied animation at the California Institute of the Arts.

In 2007 he authored the book The DV Rebel's Guide: An All-Digital Approach to Making Killer Action Movies on the Cheap for Peachpit Press.

In 2008 following the suspension of The Orphanage he became software director of Red Giant Software. In October 2009 it was announced in The Hollywood Reporter that he would direct Psy-Ops.
