= Alvin M. Fountain =

Alvin Marcus Fountain (July 10, 1899 – May 2, 1989) was a former professor of English at North Carolina State University and a notable college historian.

== Biography ==
As a student at NC State from 1919 to 1923, Fountain served as the editor of the Technician, NC State's student newspaper and the co-author of the NC State Alma Mater, originally composed at ROTC summer camp at Camp (later Fort) McClellan in Alabama in 1922: "Where the winds of Dixie softly blow o'er the fields of Caroline, There stands ever cherished, N.C. State, as thy honored shrine So lift your voices! Loudly sing from hill to oceanside! Our hearts ever hold you, N.C. State in the folds of our love and pride." Fountain graduated from NC State in 1923 as salutatorian with a degree in electrical engineering, later receiving and M.S. in sociology with a thesis on the spending patterns of mill workers at Pilot Mills in Raleigh, North Carolina (1926); an M.S. in English literature from Columbia University with a thesis on ante-bellum Charleston, South Carolina, as a literary center (1930); and a Ph.D. in English from the George Peabody College in Nashville, Tennessee, with a dissertation on courses in technical writing (1937).

Fountain co-authored several English textbooks including The Engineer's Manual of English (1943) and Manual of Technical Writing (1957).

In 1991 NC State University named Fountain Dining Hall in honor of the former professor. NCSU Libraries Special Collections Research Center serves as the repository for the Alvin Marcus Fountain Papers.
