= Slingshot (2005 film) =

- DVD Cover
- Directed by: Jay Alaimo
- Written by: Jay Alaimo; Matt Fiorello; Matthew Quinn Martin
- Starring: David Arquette; Thora Birch; Balthazar Getty; Julianna Margulies
- Cinematography: Paul Daley
- Music by: C.J. Vanston
- Release date: 2005
- Country: United States
- Language: English

Slingshot is a 2005 American independent crime film directed by Jay Alaimo and written by Alaimo & Matt Fiorello and Matthew Quinn Martin. The film stars David Arquette, Thora Birch, Balthazar Getty and Julianna Margulies.

== Plot ==
Taylor (Getty) and Ashley (Arquette), best friends since childhood, are drifters, going across country, pulling low-level cons. They end up in Fairfield, CT, where they embark on a bigger scheme: to scam wealthy, as well as lonely, housewives.

== Cast ==
- David Arquette as Ash
- Thora Birch as April
- Balthazar Getty as Taylor
- Julianna Margulies as Karen
- Joely Fisher as Emma
- Michael Janik as Dickson
- Svetlana Metkina as Fast Bobby
- Lillo Brancato as DJ
- Katie Chonacas as Ruby
- Sara Colton as Constance
- Kat Coiro as Tina (credited as Katherine Cunningham-Eves)
- Spencer Diamond as Tracey
- Patrick Dizney as Gerry
- Rachel Konstantin as Candice
- Andrea Leigh as Joy
- Eric Rath as Banker
- Krysten Ritter as Beth
- Irene Walsh as Suzanne
