= Jay Alaimo =

American film director

- Born: James Joseph Alaimo III; Suffield, Connecticut, U.S.
- Occupations: Writer, producer, director

Jay Alaimo, also known as James Joseph Alaimo III; is a writer, director and producer in the film, television, and web series. He recently named a new CBD soda water, the first of its kind to be based out of New York City, called Bimble.

== Early life ==
Alaimo was born in Suffield, Connecticut. Alaimo graduated from Roanoke College where he was a member of Alpha Psi Omega National Theatre Honor Society.

== Career ==
Alaimo's first film, Pretzel, was made in 2001 which he wrote, directed, produced. He then co-wrote, directed and co-produced Slingshot, which had its world premiere at the 2005 Tribeca Film Festival. In 2006, he directed episodes of the television series Scrubs. Starting in 2011 and through 2012, he directed the independent film Chlorine, starring Kyra Sedgwick and Vincent D'Onofrio.

Jay Alaimo and partner Chris Davis produced the award winning movie Picaresque, with Mikey DeTemple. They immediately followed up on the global success with their second film with Mikey, Sight | Sound, which won several awards and was promoted in partnership with Tommy Hilfiger.

In the Spring of 2018, Jay and his longtime friend & collaborator, Phil Conserva, started Moveable Artist Inc. Their first mission was to chase the story of the Rallye des Gazelles, an all female, off-road, motor and electric vehicle race, spanning 10 days, across south eastern Morocco, deep in the Saharan Desert.
