= Liam Kennedy (academic) =

Irish academic

Liam Kennedy is an Irish academic, a professor and director of the Clinton Institute for American Studies at University College Dublin, since 2004. He is the co-founder and editor of America Unfiltered, a media platform and podcast about American politics.

== Publications ==
=== As author ===
- Susan Sontag: Mind as Passion (1995)
- Race and Urban Space in American Culture (2000)
- Afterimages: Photography and US Foreign Policy (2016)
- Trump's America (2020)
- The Routledge International Handbook of Diaspora Diplomacy (2022)

=== As editor ===
- Urban Space and Representation (1999), co-editor
- City Sites: An Electronic Book (2000), co-editor
- Remaking Birmingham: The Visual Culture of Urban Regeneration (2004), editor
- The Wire: Race, Class and Genre (2013), co-editor
- The Violence of the Image (2014), co-editor
