= The DV Rebel's Guide =

2006 non-fiction book on filmmaking

- 1st Edition
- Author: Stu Maschwitz
- Language: English
- Subject: Filmmaking, Visual Effects
- Publisher: Peachpit Press
- Publication place: United States
- ISBN: 978-0321413642
- Website: http://www.peachpit.com/store/dv-rebels-guide-an-all-digital-approach-to-making-killer-9780321413642

The DV Rebel's Guide: An All-Digital Approach to Making Killer Action Movies on the Cheap is a non-fiction book and filmmaking handbook written by Stu Maschwitz for Peachpit Press. It was his first book, and has been called "a must-read for any and all filmmakers." MircroFilmmaker Magazine named it an "industry icon."

Maschwitz publicly announced he was working on the book in February 2006. It was officially published on December 22 of that year.

== Overview ==
The DV Rebel's Guide explores making action movies within the constraints of small or nonexistent budgets. Focus is given to working with inexpensive DV cameras. Maschwitz has a background as a film and commercial director, visual effects artist, and indie filmmaker. He cites that experience in the book while discussing a variety of filmmaking topics. Some of the areas covered include:

- Achieving a high production value
- Planning an indie film production
- Shooting and acquiring footage
- Creating visual effects and special effects on a small budget
- Editing style and technique
- Online editing of DV footage for maximum quality

Maschwitz also references numerous scenes from Hollywood films and suggests watching the films discussed in each chapter. Those scenes are analyzed, with suggestions offered to achieve similar results for little or no money.

The book shipped with an accompanying DVD which included:

- An extra chapter examining the selection and use of cameras
- The Last Birthday Card, a short film filmed, directed, and edited by Maschwitz
- Assorted visual effects tools

Maschwitz states that his blog Prolost is the evolving, electronic update to the book.

== Style ==
The writing style of the book has been called casual, conversational, and user friendly.

Maschwitz stated that the conversational feel was something he felt passionately about, and spoke with the publisher ahead of time to ensure they understood the tone he was pursuing.

== Cover design ==
The cover was designed by Mimi Heft, a designer for Peachpit Press. It features images of bullet holes, and looks as if it was burned at the edge. Additionally, the entire book was printed with curved corners on the right-hand side. Of the cover, Maschwitz said, "The tough sell was the rounded corners!"

== Reception ==
A blurb for the book was written by film director Robert Rodriguez, who said:

I'd been wanting to write a book for the new breed of digital filmmakers, but now I don't have to. My pal and fellow movie maker Stu Maschwitz has compressed years of experience into this thorough guide. Don't make a movie without reading this book!"

Microfilmmaker Magazine gave it an Award of Superiority.

FX Guide said:

While the book covers many concepts that will admittedly be familiar to artists working on visual effects or who went to film school, its such an enjoyable read of tales in the trenches that you stick around for the nuggets of knowledge.
