= Bobby (2006 film) =

American drama film

- Theatrical release poster
- Directed by: Emilio Estevez
- Written by: Emilio Estevez
- Produced by: Edward Bass; Holly Wiersma; Michel Litvak
- Starring: See Cast
- Cinematography: Michael Barrett
- Edited by: Richard Chew
- Music by: Mark Isham
- Production companies: The Weinstein Company; Bold Films
- Distributed by: Metro-Goldwyn-Mayer (through MGM Distribution Co.)
- Release dates: September 14, 2006 (TIFF); November 17, 2006 (United States)
- Running time: 116 minutes
- Country: United States
- Language: English
- Budget: $14 million
- Box office: $20.7 million

Bobby is a 2006 American drama film written and directed by Emilio Estevez, and starring an ensemble cast featuring Harry Belafonte, Joy Bryant, Nick Cannon, Laurence Fishburne, Spencer Garrett, Helen Hunt, Joshua Jackson, Anthony Hopkins, Ashton Kutcher, Shia LaBeouf, Lindsay Lohan, William H. Macy, Demi Moore, Martin Sheen, Christian Slater, Sharon Stone, Freddy Rodriguez, Heather Graham, Mary Elizabeth Winstead, Elijah Wood, David Krumholtz and Estevez. The screenplay is a fictionalized account of the hours leading up to the June 5, 1968, shooting of U.S. Senator Robert F. Kennedy in the kitchen of the Ambassador Hotel in Los Angeles following his victory in the 1968 Democratic presidential primary in California. The film was produced by The Weinstein Company and Bold Films and distributed by Metro-Goldwyn-Mayer (through MGM Distribution Co.) and premiered at the Toronto International Film Festival on September 14, 2006 before being released theatrically on November 17, 2006. The film received mixed reviews from critics and grossed $20.7 million against a $14 million budget.

== Plot ==
The film recreates the ambiance of the era and invokes the hopes inspired by Kennedy through the use of actual broadcast and newsfilm footage of the senator intercut with dramatic sequences involving mostly fictional characters. It uses an ensemble plot device similar to that employed in the 1932 film Grand Hotel and by Robert Altman in Nashville.

The characters include John Casey, a retired hotel doorman who spends his days in the lobby playing chess with his friend Nelson; Diane, who is marrying her friend William with the hope his marital status will get him deployed to a military base in Germany rather than the battlefields of Vietnam when his tour of duty begins; Virginia Fallon, an alcoholic singer whose career is on the downswing, her put-upon husband/manager Tim, and her agent Phil; Miriam Ebbers, a beautician who works in the hotel salon, and her husband Paul, the hotel manager, who is having an affair with switchboard operator Angela; food and beverage manager Daryl Timmons, whose racist attitude gets him fired; African American sous chef Edward Robinson and Mexican American busboys José and Miguel; hotel coffee shop waitress Susan; Jimmy and Cooper, Kennedy campaign volunteers who are sidetracked by an acid trip they take with the help of drug dealer Fisher; married socialites and campaign donors Samantha and Jack; campaign manager Wade and staffer Dwayne, who is in love with Angela's colleague, Patricia; and Czechoslovak reporter Lenka Janáčková, who is determined to get an interview with Kennedy.

At the end of the film, Kennedy is shot after giving his acceptance speech. A man named Sirhan Sirhan would be convicted of the assassination. After being shot, Kennedy is cradled and protected by Jose until help arrives. As Kennedy's speech "On the Mindless Menace of Violence", delivered in 1968 to the City Club of Cleveland, Ohio, is played over the aftermath, the film shows that Samantha, Daryl, Cooper, Jimmy and William are among those also injured by Sirhan's wild firing. Sirhan is apprehended, while Kennedy is rushed into an ambulance (as are the others eventually), and everyone else is moved by the events that have just occurred. Closing titles reveal that Kennedy died of his injuries the following morning with his wife Ethel at his side, and the other victims of the shooting survived.

== Cast ==
- Harry Belafonte as Nelson
- Joy Bryant as Patricia
- Nick Cannon as Dwayne Clark
- Emilio Estevez as Tim Fallon
- Laurence Fishburne as Edward Robinson
- Dave Fraunces as Robert F. Kennedy
- Jeridan Frye as Ethel Kennedy
- Spencer Garrett as David
- Brian Geraghty as Jimmy
- Heather Graham as Angela
- Anthony Hopkins as John Casey
- Helen Hunt as Samantha Stevens
- Joshua Jackson as Wade Buckley
- David Kobzantsev as Sirhan Sirhan
- David Krumholtz as Agent Phil
- Ashton Kutcher as Fisher
- Shia LaBeouf as Cooper
- Lindsay Lohan as Diane Howser
- William H. Macy as Paul Ebbers
- Svetlana Metkina as Lenka
- Demi Moore as Virginia Fallon
- Freddy Rodriguez as José Rojas
- Martin Sheen as Jack Stevens
- Christian Slater as Daryl Timmons
- Sharon Stone as Miriam Ebbers
- Jacob Vargas as Miguel
- Mary Elizabeth Winstead as Susan Taylor
- Elijah Wood as William Avary

== Production ==
=== Development ===
In Bobby: The Making of an American Epic, actor/screenwriter/director Emilio Estevez discusses the problems he had developing his script. Suffering from writer's block, he checked into a motel in Pismo Beach where he hoped, free from interruption, he could make some headway with his writing. While talking to the woman working at the front desk, he discovered she had been in the Ambassador Hotel on the evening Kennedy was shot, and later married two young men to help them avoid the draft. Estevez used her experience to mold the character of Diane, and the rest of the story fell into place.

The five other characters "shot" in the assassination scene do not coincide with the five actual victims—William Weisel of ABC News, Paul Schrade of the United Auto Workers union, Democratic Party activist Elizabeth Evans, Ira Goldstein of the Continental News Service and 17-year-old Kennedy campaign volunteer Irwin Stroll. The only other character based on a real person is busboy José, who represents Juan Romero, the young man who was photographed cradling Kennedy's body immediately after he was shot. The character of José has tickets to the Los Angeles Dodgers game in which Don Drysdale is expected to set the record of six consecutive shutouts, but is obliged to work a double shift, forcing him to miss the game. Drysdale did, in fact, achieve his sixth shutout on June 4, 1968, and was congratulated by Kennedy during the victory speech Kennedy delivered just before being shot.

=== Music ===
The film score was composed by Mark Isham, with "Never Gonna Break My Faith" written by Bryan Adams and performed by Aretha Franklin, Mary J. Blige, and the Boys Choir of Harlem, which was played during the closing credits. Also, a newly recorded version of "Louie Louie" was performed in character by Demi Moore for the film.

Songs heard throughout the film consist of a music compilation from the 1960s, including "The Tracks of My Tears" by Smokey Robinson & The Miracles, "I Was Made to Love Her" by Stevie Wonder, "Ain't That Peculiar" by Marvin Gaye, an original acoustic version of "The Sound of Silence" by Simon & Garfunkel, "Anji" covered by Jason Huxley, "Come See About Me" by The Supremes, "There's a Kind of Hush" by Herman's Hermits, "Black Is Black" by Los Bravos, "Season of the Witch" and "Hurdy Gurdy Man" by Donovan, "Wives and Lovers" by Jack Jones, "Magic Moments" by Perry Como, "Pata Pata" by Miriam Makeba and "Initials" from the musical Hair.

The soundtrack album Bobby features The Supremes, Shorty Long, Hugh Masekela, The Moody Blues and Los Bravos.

== Release ==
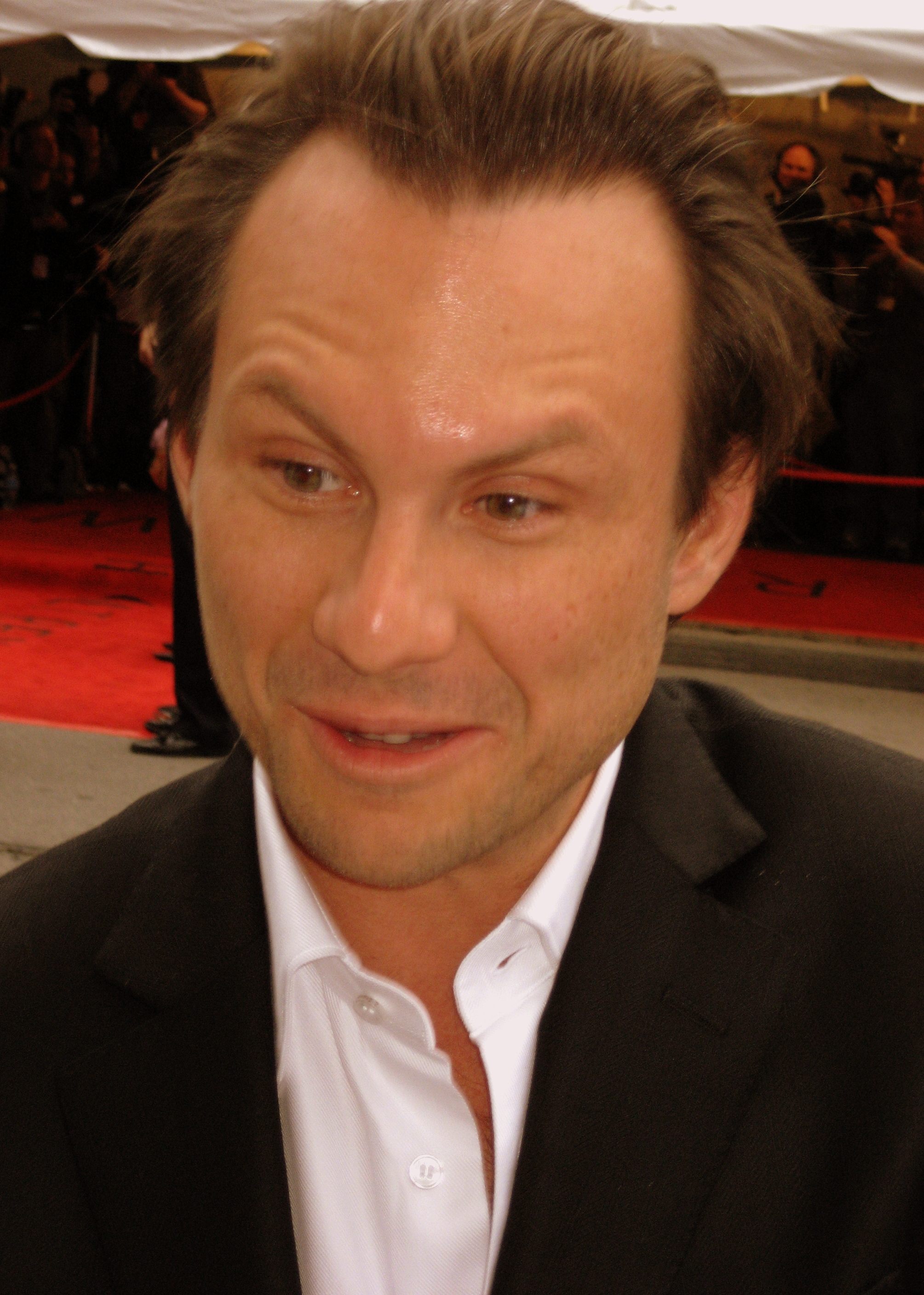
Christian Slater - who played Daryl Timmons in the film - at TIFF for Bobby's North American debut.

After an initial premiere at the NUIG Student Cinema at the National University of Ireland, Galway, the film premiered at the Venice Film Festival and was shown at the Deauville Film Festival, the 2006 Toronto International Film Festival, the Vienna International Film Festival, the London Film Festival, and AFI Fest before going into limited release in the US on November 17, 2006, and a wide release in the subsequent week. Playing on two screens, it grossed $69,039 during its opening weekend. It eventually earned $11,242,801 in North America and $9,461,790 in other territories for a worldwide box office of $20,704,591.

== Reception ==
As of April 2021, Bobby has an approval rating of 47% on Rotten Tomatoes based on 173 reviews, with an average score of 5.6/10. The consensus states, "Despite best intentions from director Emilio Estevez and his ensemble cast, they succumb to a script filled with pointless subplots and awkward moments working too hard to parallel contemporary times." The film also has a score of 54 out of 100 on Metacritic, based on 31 critics, indicating mixed or average reviews. Audiences polled by CinemaScore gave the film an average score of "B+" on an A+ to F scale.

A. O. Scott of The New York Times wrote that despite the director's "large and honorable task" and "entirely admirable" intentions, "The actors seem more like 'very special guest stars' than like real, 1968-vintage Americans ... Some of the stories feel too obviously melodramatic, while others are vague to the point of inscrutability. In the Vietnam- and drug-related plots, the point is hammered home too hard ... while other narratives wind toward no discernible point at all. Nonetheless, the ambition behind Bobby is large and serious."

Kevin Crust of the Los Angeles Times called it "an ambitious film drenched in sincerity and oozing with nostalgia that, despite the energy provided by its title icon via archival footage, falls flat dramatically in nearly every other way. It aspires for the Altmanesque interplay of Nashville or Short Cuts but instead feels like one of those '70s disaster epics such as Earthquake or The Towering Inferno, in which a star-studded cast endures melodramatic story lines as the audience awaits the inevitable momentous event and tries to guess who will be around at the finish ... It's easy to become swept up in the palpable enthusiasm Estevez shows toward his subject, but the pedestrian and overly expositional dialogue of the film's characters proves to be as stifling as the excerpts from Kennedy's speeches are stirring."

Deborah Young of Variety said of Estevez, "Stepping up as writer and director in a way he never has before, [he] successfully pulls together a complexly designed narrative", and added the film "carries an eerie topicality that makes many of its insights instantly click." Armond White of New York Press wrote that the film "has a humane sweetness", and that it "literally and vividly unites different ethnic groups, labor strata and social castes" in a way that "is not schematic—its exactitude and believability has a Tocquevillian brilliance."

Steve Persall of the St. Petersburg Times graded the film C, calling it "a misguided jumble of too much fiction, few facts and zero speculation" and Estevez "a mediocre filmmaker". Michael Medved, who was in the Ambassador ballroom (20 feet from the podium) the night Kennedy was shot, awarded the film three out of four stars and called it "intriguing but imperfect". He added, "Emilio Estevez gets most of the feelings of the occasion right. But, the melodramatic, multi-character format proves somewhat uneven and distracting."

Richard Roeper said, "Estevez writes and directs with lots of passion, not so much subtlety ... [He] wants the movie to be on the level of a Robert Altman film like Nashville but falls short." Peter Travers of Rolling Stone gave the film one star and called it "trite fiction" and a work of "insipid ineptitude". He ranked it among the worst films of 2006, as did Lou Lumerick of the New York Post, who dubbed it an "ambitious, but utterly wrong-headed trivialization."

== Awards and nominations ==
Award	Nominee	Status
ALMA Award for Outstanding Motion Picture	Bobby	Nominated
ALMA Award for Outstanding Director	Bobby	Nominated
ALMA Award for Outstanding Screenplay	Bobby	Nominated
Broadcast Film Critics Association Award for Best Cast	Bobby	Nominated
Golden Globe Award for Best Motion Picture — Drama	Bobby	Nominated
Golden Globe Award for Best Original Song	"Never Gonna Break My Faith" by Bryan Adams, Eliot Kennedy, and Andrea Remanda	Nominated
Hollywood Film Festival Award for Best Ensemble Cast	Bobby	Won
Hollywood Film Festival Award for Best Breakthrough Actress	Lindsay Lohan	Won
NAACP Image Award for Outstanding Supporting Actor in a Motion Picture	Harry Belafonte	Nominated
Phoenix Film Critics Society Award for Breakout Performance of the Year — Director	Bobby	Won
Screen Actors Guild Award for Outstanding Performance by a Cast in a Motion Picture	Bobby	Nominated
Teen Choice Award for Choice Movie Actress — Drama	Lindsay Lohan	Nominated
Venice Film Festival Biografilm Award	Emilio Estevez	Won
Venice Film Festival Golden Lion	Emilio Estevez	Nominated

== See also ==
- Robert F. Kennedy in media
- JFK, a 1991 film by Oliver Stone detailing the assassination of Robert F. Kennedy's brother, President John F. Kennedy.
- Parkland, a 2013 film commemorating the 50th anniversary of the JFK assassination.
