= Chris Hondros =

American photographer (1970–2011)

- Born: March 14, 1970; New York City, US
- Died: April 20, 2011 (aged 41); Misrata, Libya
- Cause of death: Mortar attack by pro-Gaddafi government forces
- Education: North Carolina State University (BA); Ohio University (MA)
- Occupation: Photojournalist

Chris Hondros (March 14, 1970 – April 20, 2011) was an American war photographer. Hondros was a finalist twice for a Pulitzer Prize for Breaking News Photography.

== Biography ==
Chris Hondros was born in New York City to immigrant Greek and German parents who were child refugees after World War II. He spent most of his childhood in Fayetteville, North Carolina, where he graduated from Terry Sanford High School in 1988.

Hondros studied English literature at North Carolina State University where he also worked for the Technician, the campus newspaper. In 1991, Hondros submitted his portfolio and was invited to attend the Eddie Adams Workshop. After graduating from State in 1993, Hondros moved to Athens, Ohio, and earned a master's degree at Ohio University School of Visual Communications. He began his career at the Troy Daily News in Ohio as an intern and later chief photographer before returning to Fayetteville in 1996 to begin a career with The Fayetteville Observer and to be close to his father who died of cancer in 2000.

Hondros left his job at The Fayetteville Observer in 1998 to return to New York and concentrate on international reporting. From his base in New York, Hondros worked in most of the world's major conflict zones since the late 1990s, including Kosovo, Angola, Sierra Leone, Afghanistan, Kashmir, the West Bank, Iraq, and Liberia.

Hondros was awarded the United States Agency for International Development (USAID) Photojournalism Grant in 1999. In 2001, Hondros was selected for the Pew Fellowship for International Reporting through Johns Hopkins University.

Following the September 11 attacks, Hondros took photographs at ground zero. Hondros went to cover the Liberian Civil War in 2003. It was here that Hondros photographed Joseph Duo in an image that graced the front cover of publications worldwide. Hondros also followed Sen. John Kerry's presidential campaign in 2004. When Hondros returned to cover the Liberian election in 2005, he was able to meet Joseph Duo again to discuss the progress that had been made in Liberia since his last visit. His work included disasters such as Hurricane Katrina and the 2010 Haiti earthquake. The United States presidential election in 2008 found Hondros photographing Governor and Vice-Presidential candidate Sarah Palin.

His work appeared as the covers of magazines such as Newsweek and the Economist, and on the front pages of The New York Times, The Washington Post, and the Los Angeles Times. Photographer Tyler Hicks described Hondros as a "sensitive photographer," adding that "He never was in it for himself or for the vanity of what the job brings with it. He really believes in his work."

His photography was featured in the documentary film, Liberia: A Fragile Peace (2006).

== Iraq photos ==
Hondros's images from Iraq, especially a January 2005 picture series detailing the shooting of an Iraqi family by U.S. troops, were published extensively and garnered worldwide acclaim and criticism.

On January 18, 2005, an Iraqi family was traveling in a car in Tal Afar. Fearing a suicide bomber, U.S. troops fired warning shots, then fired into the vehicle, killing both parents and paralyzing one of their five children sitting in the back seat. As a result of the worldwide interest in his case generated by Hondros's pictures, the boy, Rakan Hassan, was later flown to the United States for treatment in a Boston hospital, but was murdered in a bombing by insurgents shortly after his return.

Hondros won dozens of international awards for the images. One of his pictures of this tragedy is likely to become "one of the few photos from the Iraq war that could stand out in history" according to Liam Kennedy, from University College Dublin.

In an interview, Hondros stated:

Almost every soldier in Iraq has been involved in some sort of incident like that or another, I would say. Their attitude about it was grim, but it wasn't the end of their world. It was, "Well, kind of wished they'd stopped. We fired warning shots. Damn, I don't know why the hell they didn't stop. What're you doing later, you want to play Nintendo? Okay." Just a day's work for them. That stuff happens in Iraq a lot.

== Libya and death ==
It was reported on April 20, 2011, that Hondros had been fatally wounded in a mortar attack by government forces in Misrata while covering the 2011 Libyan civil war. Photojournalist Tim Hetherington was also killed in the attack, which wounded two other photographers. Photojournalists Guy Martin said that the group was traveling with rebel fighters. According to The New York Times, Hondros died from his injuries as a result of severe brain trauma.

== Chris Hondros Fund ==
The Chris Hondros Fund is a nonprofit organization established in 2011 in the memory of Hondros and his life's work. The fund's mission is to provide non-profit institutions with grants to advocate for photojournalists. One fellowship for attendance to the Eddie Adams Workshop will be offered annually along with one other fellowship awarded by application.

The first fellowship was awarded in 2012 by Getty Images and the Chris Hondros Fund.

== Hondros film ==
In 2013 the author Greg Campbell launched a Kickstarter campaign to produce a documentary named Hondros: A Life in Frames. The project was launched with an initial goal of $30,000.00 and became fully funded within three days with a total of $89,639 raised.

Campbell and Hondros met and became best friends in high school. After Hondros' death, Campbell was contacted by Liberian Joseph Duo, who was the subject of one of Hondros' most famous photographs. Campbell learned that Hondros had returned to Liberia to help Duo earn his high school, college, and eventually law school education.

The film is executive produced by Jake Gyllenhaal and Jamie Lee Curtis. Curtis also assisted Campbell in finding the first significant funding for the project from the Annenberg Foundation.

The film, re-titled as Hondros, had its world premiere in April 2017 at the Tribeca Film Festival, where it won the Audience Choice Award for documentaries. It was released in theaters on March 2, 2018.

== Awards ==
- 2003: World Press Photo, Amsterdam: Honorable Mention, Spot News.
- 2003: Overseas Press Club, New York: John Faber Award.
- 2004: Pulitzer Prize for Breaking News Photography: Finalist for his work in Liberia.
- 2004: Pictures of the Year International Competition, Missouri School of Journalism: 3rd Place and Honourable Mention, Conflict.
- 2005: World Press Photo, Amsterdam: Second Prize, Spot News.
- 2006: Overseas Press Club, New York: Robert Capa Gold Medal for "exceptional courage and enterprise" in his work from Iraq.
- 2007: American Photo magazine: named "Hero of Photography" for his work in Iraq.
- 2007: Days Japan International Photojournalism Awards: First Place.
- 2008: National Magazine Awards: nominee for his essay "A Window on Baghdad".
- 2012: Pulitzer Prize for Breaking News Photography: Finalist for "coverage of revolutionary protests known as the Arab Spring".

== See also ==
- List of photojournalists
