= Legion (2010 film) =

American action horror film directed by Scott Stewart

- Theatrical release poster
- Directed by: Scott Stewart
- Written by: Peter Schink; Scott Stewart
- Produced by: David Lancaster; Michel Litvak
- Starring: Paul Bettany; Lucas Black; Tyrese Gibson; Adrianne Palicki; Charles S. Dutton; Jon Tenney; Kevin Durand; Willa Holland; Kate Walsh; Dennis Quaid
- Cinematography: John Lindley
- Edited by: Steven Kemper
- Music by: John Frizzell
- Production companies: Screen Gems; Bold Films
- Distributed by: Sony Pictures Releasing
- Release date: January 22, 2010 (United States)
- Running time: 100 minutes
- Country: United States
- Language: English
- Budget: $26 million
- Box office: $67.9 million

Legion is a 2010 American action horror film directed by Scott Stewart and co-written by Stewart and Peter Schink. The film stars Paul Bettany, Lucas Black, Tyrese Gibson, Adrianne Palicki, Kate Walsh, and Dennis Quaid. A story of the Second Coming, the film follows a group of people as they attempt to protect an infant savior from angels and the possessed in an apocalypse.

Sony Pictures Worldwide Acquisitions Group acquired most of the film's worldwide distribution rights, releasing the film theatrically in North America on January 22, 2010, through Screen Gems. Legion was released to negative critical reception but was a success at the box office, earning over $67 million on a $26 million budget. A television series titled Dominion, set 25 years after the film, premiered on the American cable television network Syfy on June 19, 2014.

== Plot ==
The Archangel Michael falls to Earth in Los Angeles and cuts off his wings. After looting a weapons warehouse and stealing a police car from a possessed police officer, Michael travels to the Paradise Falls Diner, near the edge of the Mojave Desert. Meanwhile, Kyle, a single father driving to Los Angeles, stops at the diner. He meets the owner, Bob Hanson; Jeep, Bob's son; Percy, the short-order cook; Charlie, a pregnant waitress; Howard and Sandra Anderson, a married couple; and Audrey, their rebellious teenage daughter. As the diner's television, radio, and telephone fail, elderly Gladys enters the diner and becomes abnormally hostile, biting off a piece of Howard's neck before Kyle shoots her. A massive swarm of flies surrounds the diner and isolates its patrons from the outside world, thwarting their attempt to transport Howard to the hospital.

Michael arrives and arms the patrons as the sky turns black. Hundreds of cars approach, filled with possessed people who begin to attack the diner. Michael leads the patrons in the fight, but Howard is dragged away. Later, Michael explains that God has lost faith in mankind and has sent His angels to destroy the human race. He reveals that Charlie's baby must stay alive, as it is destined to be the savior of mankind; Michael disobeyed God's order to kill Charlie's baby, as he still has faith in humanity, and believes that in the end, God's mercy will outweigh His wrath.

The next morning, Sandra discovers Howard crucified on an upside-down cross behind the restaurant, covered with huge boils. She tries to rescue him, but he explodes into acid. Percy dies shielding Sandra from the blast. Sandra goes insane and must be restrained. Meanwhile, the remaining survivors hear a radio transmission that reveals other pockets of resistance. One such refuge is nearby, but Michael advises them not to go, since they would be too vulnerable on the move. That night, a second wave of possessed people attacks. Kyle is lured into a trap and killed, while Charlie goes into labor. Audrey and Michael help deliver the baby as trumpets sound, signaling the approach of the Archangel Gabriel. In a panic, Sandra breaks her restraints and tries to give the baby to the possessed, but Michael executes her. Moments later, Gabriel enters the diner and fatally wounds Bob. Michael urges the group to escape and tells Jeep to "find the prophets" and "learn to read the instructions."

The hordes of possessed humans cannot approach Charlie's baby; Jeep, Audrey, Charlie, and the baby go to Michael's police car. Gabriel and Michael fight to a standstill before Gabriel stabs Michael through the chest. Michael dies, and his body disappears. Dying, Bob uses his lighter to ignite the diner's gas main and blow up the diner, incinerating himself and the remaining possessed.

Jeep finds his body covered in the same mysterious tattoos from Michael's body and concludes that they are his instructions. Gabriel appears and a scuffle ensues in which Audrey is killed. Gabriel corners them in the nearby mountains and is about to kill them when Michael descends from Heaven, healed and restored to the rank of Archangel. Michael states that Gabriel gave God what He asked for, but Michael gave Him what He needed, giving humanity another chance. He disarms Gabriel and says that this was God's plan to test His angels, believing they had become blind in their loyalty; since Gabriel continues to obey blindly, he has failed Him. Ashamed, Gabriel leaves. Michael explains to Jeep that he is the child's true protector. Jeep asks Michael whether they will ever see him again. Michael simply encourages him to have faith; Michael then flies away. Charlie and Jeep reach the top of the mountain and see a small town in the valley below. Later, Charlie, Jeep, and the baby drive away in a vehicle full of weapons.

== Cast ==
- Paul Bettany as Michael
- Lucas Black as Jeep Hanson
- Tyrese Gibson as Kyle Williams
- Adrianne Palicki as Charlie
- Charles S. Dutton as Percy Walker
- Jon Tenney as Howard Anderson
- Kevin Durand as Gabriel
- Willa Holland as Audrey Anderson
- Kate Walsh as Sandra Anderson
- Dennis Quaid as Bob Hanson
- Jeanette Miller as Gladys Foster
- Doug Jones as Ice Cream Man
- Cameron Harlow as Minivan Boy
- Luke and Django Stinehart as The Baby

== Production ==
Principal photography took place in New Mexico in the spring of 2008. The director of photography was John Lindley.

== Reception ==
=== Box office ===
Legion was released on January 22, 2010, in 2,476 theaters and took in $6,686,233—$2,700 per theater its opening day. On its opening weekend, it grossed $17,501,625—$7,069 per theater and placed second behind Avatar. It placed No. 6 on its second weekend, and grossed an estimated $6.8 million—$2,746 per theater, a 61.1% drop from the previous weekend. The film has come to gross $67,918,658 worldwide.

=== Critical response ===
Review aggregator Rotten Tomatoes gives the film a score of 20% based on reviews from 104 critics, with an average rating of 3.78 out of 10. The site's consensus is: "Despite a solid cast and intermittent thrills, Legion suffers from a curiously languid pace, confused plot, and an excess of dialogue." Metacritic, which assigns a weighted average score out of 0–100 reviews from film critics, has a rating score of 32% based on 14 reviews. Audiences polled by CinemaScore gave the film an average grade of "C-" on an A+ to F scale.

Paul Nicholasi of Dread Central gave the film a one-and-a-half stars out of five, saying, "The finished product is shockingly bad. If countless angles of people firing guns with spent shells clinking to the ground are all your heart yearns for, then Legion may be your ideal Saturday night. Hoping for anything more is an exercise in futility. Spare yourself the agony." Brad Miska of Bloody Disgusting gave it 1 out of 5 stars, calling it "a prude film with some potential. It's boring, slow paced and it takes itself way too seriously." Variety film critic Joe Leydon gave the film a mixed analysis. Leydon claimed "Even when the blood-and-thunder hokiness of the over-the-top plot tilts perilously close to absurdity, the admirably straight-faced performances by well-cast lead players provide just enough counterbalance to sustain curiosity and sympathy." Frank Scheck of The Hollywood Reporter also gave the film a mixed review stating, "the goings-on in Legion are seriously silly (not to mention more than a little derivative of endless movies, especially the Terminator series), but director Scott Stewart has provided enough stylish finesse to make the proceedings a real hoot."

Kim Newman compares the film to Tales from the Crypt: Demon Knight, The Terminator, and The Prophecy, stating, "In most religious-themed-end-of-the-world films—and there are more than you'd think—it's the righteous who stand against the dark. Here, it's gun-owners, which suggests how thoroughly screwed up Legion's values are."

Collis Clark of Entertainment Weekly refers to this movie as dull: "The problem lies not with the cast, and Kate Walsh, in particular, deserves some sort of medal for the scene in which she narrowly escapes being dissolved by pus. Alas, the script is a rough beast that slouches toward utter ludicrousness. 'The future has been unwritten!' intones Paul Bettany's Michael at one point. But Legion barely seems to have been written at all."

Mike Hale of The New York Times says, "Unfortunately, the script by Scott Stewart, who directed, and Peter Schink emphasizes stagebound melodramatics and banal television-style catharsis over action and humor... Amid a bull market for end-of-days tales, 'Legion' stands out for its explicitly biblical underpinnings and its claustrophobia."

Peter Bradshaw in The Guardian says, "Not many horror movies have the decency to let elderly performers steal the show. But Jeanette Miller walks off with this one, in the robustly written role of a potty-mouthed satanic old lady who takes a fatal bite out of someone's neck. Paul Bettany plays the particularly badass angel who comes to earth in an attempt to stop God and his heavenly armies from wiping out humanity."

== Home media ==
Legion was released on DVD and Blu-ray on May 11, 2010.

== Television ==
In 2014, Syfy began airing the television series Dominion, a sequel set 25 years after the end of the film. Scott Stewart, the writer/director of Legion, served as executive producer. Stewart also directed Dominion's pilot episode, which was written by Vaun Wilmott and aired on June 19, 2014.

== See also ==
- List of films about angels
