= Greg Campbell (author) =

American journalist (born 1970)

- Born: Yeadon, Pennsylvania, US
- Occupations: Journalist, author

Greg Campbell (born July 7, 1970) is an American journalist, documentary filmmaker and nonfiction author who lives in Los Angeles, California.

== Biography ==
Campbell graduated from Terry Sanford High School in 1988. He then studied English and journalism at the University of North Carolina at Greensboro and University of Colorado at Boulder.

He began his journalism career in 1995 as a freelance writer at the Boulder Weekly, becoming a full time reporter and eventually the editor in chief. As a reporter, Campbell covered the reunification of Sarajevo after the Bosnian War.

In 1999 Campbell worked at the Longmont Times-Call as a business editor and special projects reporter. He left the paper in 2001.

Campbell co-founded the Fort Collins Weekly in 2002, a free weekly local newspaper that was distributed in Fort Collins, Colorado. It was bought by Swift Communications in 2007 and changed to Fort Collins Now. Campbell left in 2009 to continue his career as a freelance writer.

His freelance work has been published in The Atlantic, The Economist, USA Today, WSJ. Magazine, The Guardian, Salon, Paris Match, CNNMoney.com, The Christian Science Monitor, San Francisco Chronicle, The Daily Beast, World Policy Journal, Lonely Planet and Foreign Policy.

== Work in Kosovo ==
Campbell traveled on assignment in 1996 for the Boulder Weekly to the Balkans to cover the reunification of Sarajevo.

His work led to his first book, The Road to Kosovo: A Balkan Diary in 1998/1999, about the Balkan War published by Westview Press. The Road to Kosovo was a finalist for the Colorado Nonfiction Book of the Year for 1999.

== Blood Diamonds ==
In 2001, Campbell traveled to Sierra Leone to conduct research for his next book about blood diamonds. Blood Diamonds: Tracing the Deadly Path of the World's Most Precious Stones, was published by Basic in 2002 and then released an updated version in 2012.

Blood Diamonds won the Colorado Non-Fiction Book of the year award in 2002. The book also served as the basis for the 2006 film Blood Diamond starring Leonardo DiCaprio and Djimon Hounsou.

== Flawless ==
Campbell (along with Scott Selby) wrote Flawless: Inside the Largest Diamond Heist in History, a chronicle of one of the world's largest diamond heists from The Diamond District in Antwerp, Belgium. The book was published by Union Square Press in 2010.

Flawless was a finalist for the Colorado Book Award in 2011.

== Pot, Inc. ==
In 2012, Sterling released Pot, Inc.: Inside Medical Marijuana, America's Most Outlaw Industry. The book is a mix of a first-person journey into the world of medical marijuana and a discussion and analysis of marijuana cultivation, ethics, politics, and legality in the United States.

== Hondros ==
Campbell directed, co-wrote and produced a feature-length documentary about the life and legacy of his friend, late Getty Images photojournalist Chris Hondros, who was killed on April 20, 2011, while covering the conflict in Libya.

Campbell met Hondros in high school. After Hondros' death, Campbell was contacted by Liberian Joseph Duo, the subject of one of Hondros's most famous photographs. Campbell learned that Hondros had returned to Liberia to help Duo earn his high school and college education.

The film was executive produced by Jake Gyllenhaal and Jamie Lee Curtis. Curtis also assisted Campbell in finding the first significant funding for the project from the Annenberg Foundation.

In April 2017 the film had its world premiere as Hondros at Tribeca Film Festival, where it won the Audience Award, Documentary First Place. It had a limited theatrical release in the United States and London in March, 2018. The film was released online on March 6, 2018.
