= Portuguese Basketball All-Star Day =

- Status: Inactive
- Inaugurated: 1990
- Most recent: 2019
- Organizer: Portuguese Basketball Federation; LCB

The Portuguese Basketball All-Star Day (Portuguese: Dia das Estrelas) is an annual basketball event in Portugal, which has been organised by the Portuguese Basketball Federation since 2008. It was originally founded by the Portuguese Basketball League (LCB) in 1990 and it was run for 18 editions, formerly known as All-Star Game (Portuguese: Jogo das Estrellas). The PBF took over after the LCB ceased operations in 2008. The All-Star Game includes a match between the South and North selection, a slam-dunk and a three-point contest. The starting five of each selection is chosen by online voting by fans and the remainder is decided by coaches following the NBA pattern.

== History ==
The first edition of the All-Star Game took place in 1990–91 season, in the Azorean island of Horta on 17 November 1990. It was organised by the now defunct League of Professional Clubs (LCB) and it featured players like Carlos Lisboa, Mike Plowden, Pedro Miguel Neves, Jean-Jacques Conceição and others. It would go on for 18 seasons until 2008 when LCB was dissolved. In the 2008–09 season the Portuguese Basketball Federation (FPB) took the responsibility of organising the event choosing the town of Moimenta da Beira as the host of the first All-Star Game under its auspices. For the following season the town of Guarda was next to host the event which went in hiatus right after and for 6 years. In 2016, the PFB revived the historical event integrating it into the 12th Albufeira Youth Basketball Festival (YBF), the largest national youth sports event of Portugal.

== List of games ==
=== Organised by LCB 1990-2008 ===
Bold: Team that won the game.

Season	Date	Arena	City	Team	Score	Team	MVP
1999–00	29–30 January 2000	Pavilhão do Seixal Futebol Clube	Seixal	North	n/a	South	
2000-01	22 January 2001	Pavilhão Municipal do Barreiro	Barreiro	North	102-**108**	**South**	(United States) Justin Bailey
2001-02	20 January 2002	Pavilhão do Rio Maior	Rio Maior	Portuguese All Stars	95-**102**	**Foreign All Stars**	(United States) Scott Stewart
2002-03	1 December 2002	Pavilhão das Feiras e Exposições de Penafiel	Penafiel	LCB All Stars	89-**110**	**Portugal**	(Portugal) José Manuel Sykes
2003-04			Queluz	North	?	South	
2004-05	2 January 2005	Cidade de Almada Municipal Sports Complex	Almada	**North**	**81**-76	South	(United States) (Portugal) Heshimu Evans
2005-06	18 December 2005	Matosinhos Sports Complex	Matosinhos	**North**	**124**-91	South	(United States) Greg Stempin
2006-07	16 December 2006	Matosinhos Sports Complex	Matosinhos	North	80-**96**	**South**	(United States) Corey Benjamin
2007-08	5 February 2008	Pavilhão Multiusos Municipal António Saraiva	Peso da Régua	North	?	South	

=== Organised by PBF 2009-present ===
Bold: Team that won the game.

Season	Date	Arena	City	Team	Score	Team	MVP
2008-09	24 February 2009	Pavilhão Cidade de Viseu	Moimenta da Beira	North	83-**102**	**South**	(United States) Seth Doliboa
2009-10	17 February 2010	Pavilhão Da Guarda	Guarda	North	114-**116**	**South**	(United States) John Waller
2010-2015	Not held						
2015-16	3 April 2016	Pavilhao Desportivo de Albufeira	Albufeira	**North**	**87**-85	South	(United States) Jordan Baker
2016-17	9 April 2017	Pavilhao Desportivo de Albufeira	Albufeira	**North**	**97**-90	South	(United States) Bryce Douvier
2017-18	7 April 2018	Pavilhao Desportivo de Albufeira	Albufeira	North	103-**106**	**South**	(United States) Isaiah Johnson
2018-19	14 April 2019	Pavilhao Desportivo de Albufeira	Albufeira	North	108-**126**	**South**	(United States) Jyles Smith
2019-20	Cancelled due to the pandemic						

== Three-Point Shoot Contest ==
Season	Winner	Team	Runner-up	Team
2004-05	(Serbia) Aleksandar Matic	Barreirense	(Portugal) Diogo Carreira	Barreirense
2005-06	(United States) Jarrett Stephens	Ovarense	(Portugal) Augusto Sobrinho	FC Porto
2008-09	(United States) Nate Daniels	Illiabum Clube		
2009-10	(United States) Nate Daniels (2)	Illiabum Clube	(Portugal) Mario Fernandes	CAB Madeira
2015-16	(United States) Andrew Ferry	Vitoria de Guimarães		
2016-17	(Portugal) Tomás Barroso	Benfica	(United States) Andrew Ferry	Vitoria de Guimarães
2017-18	(Portugal) José Silva	Benfica	(United States) Derrick Coleman	Lusitânia
2018-19	(Portugal) José Silva (2)	Benfica	(Portugal) Tomás Barroso	Benfica

== Slam-Dunk Contest ==
Season	Winner	Team	Runner-up	Team
2004-05	(Portugal) Paulo Cunha	FC Porto	(Ivory Coast) Mike Lasme	Ginásio
2005-06	(Portugal) Paulo Cunha	FC Porto	(United States) Ricardo Powell	S.L. Benfica
2008-09	(United States) Tyrekus Bowman	Barreirense		
2009-10	(United States) Rod Nealy	Vitoria de Guimarães	(United States) Raheem Moss	Ginásio
2016-17	(Angola) (Portugal) Jacques Conceição	Galitos Barreiro	(United States) Raven Barber	S.L. Benfica
2017-18	(United States) Jeff Early	Illiabum Clube	(United States) Khalen Cumberlander	CAB Madeira
2018-19	(Benin) Muusa Dama	Galitos Barreiro	(United States) Micah Downs	S.L. Benfica

== Adidas Two-Ball contest ==
Season	Winners	Teams
2000-01	(Portugal) Diogo Carreira (Portugal) Sofia Ramalho	Clube Portugal Telecom; Clube Desportivo da Póvoa

== Score sheets (2000-2010) ==
- 11th All-Star Game 2000-01:

DATE: 22 January 2001
VENUE: Pavilhão Municipal do Barreiro, Barreiro
SCORE: South 108 - North 102

South : Justin Bailey 17, Marcus Norris 4, Tyrone Brown 7, David Vik 12, Matt Nover 12, António Tavares 5, Eric Clark 5, Corey Osinsky 14, Doug Muse 12, Paulo Sousa 4, Shawn Jackson 6, Carlos Seixas 10

North : Scott Stewart 12, Nuno Marçal 14, Jofre Lleal 9, Nate Fox 23, Kris Hill 7, Sherick Simpson 25, Bob Harstad 5, Nate Jonhston 7, Francisco Rodrigues, Pedro Nuno, Kirk Ford

- 12th All-Star Game 2001-02:

DATE: 20 January 2002
VENUE: Pavilhão do Rio Maior, Rio Maior
SCORE: Foreign All Stars 102 - Portuguese All Stars 95

Foreign All Stars : Herman Alston 16, Kris Hill 14, Thomas Adams 11, Heshimu Evans 11, Scott Stewart 11, Vato 10, Doug Muse 8, Howard Brown 8, Marcus Norris 5, Dion Edwards 4, Allen Ledbetter 4, Matt Nover

Portuguese All Stars : Sérgio Ramos 21, António Tavares 19, Luis Silva 15, Elvis Évora 10, Mike Richmond 10, Luis Machado 5, Nuno Marçal 4, José Costa 3, Francisco Jordao 3, Paulo Simao 3, Pedro Nuno 2, Raúl Santos

- 13th All-Star Game 2002-03:

DATE: 1 December 2002
VENUE: Pavilhão das Feiras e Exposições de Penafiel, Penafiel
SCORE: LCB All Stars 89 - Portugal 110

LCB All Stars : Thomas Adams, Emiliano Morales, Marcus Norris

Portuguese All Stars : José Manuel Sykes, Joao Santos, Matt Nover,

- 14th All-Star Game 2003-04:

DATE:
VENUE: Queluz
SCORE: North - South

North (Pepe Rodrigues): António Tavares, Mario Porter, Heshimu Evans, Chris Porter, Emiliano Morales, Jose Costa, Earl Hunt, Chema Marcos, Joffre Lleal, Nate Johnson, Kevin Fletcher, Damon Thornton

South (Alberto Babo): Jovan Zdravkovic, Tyray Pearson, Thomas Adams, Leroy Watkins, Doug Muse, Francisco Rodrigues, Nuno Perdigao, Euclides Camacho, Brian Crabtree, Paulo Simao, David Vik, Jorge Coelho

- 15th All-Star Game 2004-05:

DATE: 2 January 2005
VENUE: Cidade de Almada Municipal Sports Complex, Almada
SCORE: North 81 - South 76

North (Luis Magalhaes): Filipe da Silva, DeCarlo Deveaux 10, Heshimu Evans 20, Francisco Jordao 2, Marcus Melvin 10 - Paulo Cunha 10, Carlos Seixas 7, Aaron Eneas 4, Jose Costa 3, Mike Lasme 6, Elvis Évora 9, Joao Figueiredo

South (Alberto Babo): Michael Nurse 11, Carlos Andrade 9, Reggie Moore 2, Abdel Boukar 14, LeRoy Watkins 9 - Marco McCottry 7, Richard Anderson 3, Luis Costa 12, Armando Costa 3, Joao Gomes 4, Steffon Bradford 2

- 16th All-Star Game 2005-06:

DATE: 18 December 2005
VENUE: Matosinhos Sports Complex, Matosinhos
SCORE: North 124 - South 91

North (Luis Magalhaes): Jose Costa, Heshimu Evans, Greg Stempin 19, Jarrett Stephens, Lorenzo Orr - Trevor Huffman, Scott Stewart, Ben Reed, Paulo Cunha, Shawn Jackson, Rick Anderson, Fred Gentry

South (Alberto Babo): Filipe Da Silva, Reggie Moore, Kenny Younger, Leroy Watkins, Dametri Hill - Miguel Minhava, António Tavares, Carlos Powell, Joao Gomes, Jeff Schiffner, Jesse Smith, Jakim Donaldson

- 17th All-Star Game 2006-07:

DATE: 16 December 2006
VENUE: Matosinhos Sports Complex, Matosinhos
SCORE: South 96 - North 80

South (Henrique Vieira): Corey Benjamin 21, Joao Gomes 13, Cameron Echols 9, Leroy Watkins 6, Miguel Minhava 2; Joao Figueiredo 11, Ike Nwankwo 11, Willie Taylor 10, Brian Robinson 8, Paulo Simao 3, Antonio Pires 2, Carlos Andrade

North (Luis Magalhaes): Larry Jon Smith 17, Gregory Stempin 14, Paulo Cunha 8, Cordell Henry 6, Ben Reed 0; Nuno Marcal 12, Filipe da Silva 8, Jesse Smith 7, Jose Costa 5, Ricky Woods 3, Eric Sandrin 0, Miguel Miranda

- 18th All-Star Game 2007-08:

DATE: 5 February 2008
VENUE: Pavilhão Multiusos Municipal António Saraiva
SCORE: South - North

South (Joao Freitas, Joao Vieira): Riley-Smith, Diogo Carreira, Monty Scott, Lance Soderberg, Darrell Harris - Jose Costa, Carlos Seixas, Joao Manuel, Gerson Monteiro, Paulo Simao, Joao Santos, Anderson Ferreira

North (Luis Magalhaes, Costa Dias): Joao Figueiredo, Fred Gentry, Tyrone Levett, Elvis Evora, Toree Morris - Joao Reveles, Raheem Moss, Fernando Neves, Nate Daniels, Brandon Voorhees, Nuno Cortez, Rico Hill

- 19th All-Star Game 2008-09:

DATE: 24 February 2009
VENUE: Pavilhão Multiusos Municipal António Saraiva, Peso da Régua
SCORE: South 102 - North 83

South (Henrique Vieira, Andre Martins): Jason Smith, Joao Santos, Sergio Ramos, Tim Bush, Bruce Brown, Jeffrey Ferguson, Jose Costa, Seth Doliboa 20, Chadwick McKenzie, Tiago Pinto, Mohamed Camara, Jorge Afonso

North (Costa Dias, Carlos Cabral): Joao Reveles, John Waller, Fernando Sousa, Ricardo Hill, Nuno Cortez, Miguel Miranda, Donte Minter, Daniel Coleman, Daniel Felix, Francisco Machado, Chris Lee, Kendell Craig

- 20th All-Star Game 2009-10:

DATE: 17 February 2010
VENUE: Pavilhão Da Guarda, Guarda
SCORE: South 116 - North 114

South (Norberto Alves): Diogo Carreira, Sergio Ramos, Elvis Evora, Joao Santos, Austen Powers, Manuel Johnson, Fernando Sousa, Ricardo de Bem, Pedro Pinto, Miguel Graca, Shane Clark, Mario Fernandes

North (Moncho Lopez): Jose Costa, Brandon Dagans, Marco Gonalves, Jaime Silva, Rod Nealy, Miguel Miranda, John Waller, Carlos Andrade, Gregory Stempin, Andre Bessa, Nate Daniels, John Smith

== Players with most appearances ==
Player	All-Star	Editions	Notes
(Portugal) Jose Costa	8	2002, 2004, 2005 (I), 2005 (II), 2006, 2008, 2009, 2010	
(Portugal) António Tavares	4	2001, 2002, 2004, 2005	
(Portugal) João Santos	4	2002, 2008, 2009, 2010	
(Portugal) Paulo Simao	4	2002, 2004, 2006, 2008	
(United States) LeRoy Watkins	4	2004, 2005 (I), 2005 (II), 2006	
(Portugal) Joffre Lleal	4	1997, 1998, 1999 and 2000	
(Portugal) João Gomes	3	2005, 2006 and 2007	
(United States) Matt Nover	3	2001, 2002 (I), 2002 (II)	
(Portugal) Carlos Siexas	3	2001, 2005, 2008	
(Portugal) Joao Figueiredo	3	2005, 2006, 2008	
(Portugal) Miguel Miranda	3	2006, 2009, 2010	
(Portugal) Sérgio Ramos	3	2002, 2009, 2010	
(United States) Marcus Norris	3	2001, 2002 and 2003	
(United States) Gregory Stempin	2	2005, 2006, 2010	1x MVP
(United States) Scott Stewart	3	2001, 2002 and 2005	
(United States) Doug Muse	2	2001, 2002, 2004	
(United States) Kris Hill	2	1999 and 2000	
(United States) Tyray Pearson	2	2004, 2005	
(United States) John Waller	2	2009, 2010	1x MVP
(Portugal) Joao Reveles	2	2008, 2009	
(Portugal) Fernando Sousa	2	2009, 2010	
(Portugal) Emiliano Morales	2	2002, 2004	
(Portugal) Pedro Nuno	2	2001, 2002	

== Distinctions ==
=== FIBA Hall of Fame ===
- (Angola) Jean-Jacques Conceição
- (Angola) Angelo Victoriano
