= Hollywood Homicide =

2003 American action comedy film by Ron Shelton

- Theatrical release poster
- Directed by: Ron Shelton
- Written by: Robert Souza; Ron Shelton
- Produced by: Lou Pitt; Ron Shelton
- Starring: Harrison Ford; Josh Hartnett; Lena Olin; Bruce Greenwood; Isaiah Washington; Lolita Davidovich; Keith David; Master P; Dwight Yoakam; Martin Landau
- Cinematography: Barry Peterson
- Edited by: Paul Seydor
- Music by: Alex Wurman
- Production companies: Columbia Pictures; Revolution Studios
- Distributed by: Sony Pictures Releasing
- Release date: June 13, 2003
- Running time: 116 minutes
- Country: United States
- Language: English
- Budget: $75 million
- Box office: $51.1 million

Hollywood Homicide is a 2003 American buddy cop action comedy film starring Harrison Ford and Josh Hartnett, with a supporting cast including Lena Olin, Bruce Greenwood, Isaiah Washington, Lolita Davidovich, Keith David, Master P, Dwight Yoakam, and Martin Landau. It was directed by Ron Shelton, written by Shelton and Robert Souza, and produced by Shelton and Lou Pitt. The film is based on the true experiences of Souza, who was a homicide detective in the LAPD Hollywood Division and moonlighted as a real estate broker in his final ten years on the job. The film's title sequence is done by Wayne Fitzgerald, which marks it as his final time doing a title sequence before his death in September 2019.

Released on June 13, 2003 by Sony Pictures Releasing, Hollywood Homicide was a critical and commercial disappointment, grossing $51.1 million against a budget of $75 million and received mixed-to-negative reviews from critics, with the Rotten Tomatoes consensus stating that the film "suffers from too many subplots and not enough laughs."

== Plot ==
Sergeant Joe Gavilan is a financially strapped homicide detective with the Hollywood Division of the LAPD. He has been moonlighting as a real estate agent for seven years. His current partner is Detective K.C. Calden, a much younger detective who teaches yoga on the side and wants to be an actor.

The partners are investigating the murders of the four members of rap group "H2OClick", who were gunned down in a nightclub by two unidentified assailants. The detectives discover there was a witness who fled, and they work to track him down. They are distracted, failing to bond as partners, as Joe has to deal with a looming real estate deal that may be the key to getting out of debt, while K.C. further pursues his dreams of acting by trying to be scouted by talent agents.

Meanwhile, the manager of H2OClick, Antoine Sartain, has his head of security eliminate the two hitmen, whom he had hired to kill H2OClick, and earlier a rapper named Klepto that Sartain also managed.

Joe and K.C. believe the murders are gang-related, but when K.C. happens to see the bodies of the hitmen at the morgue, they conclude that the murders were orchestrated. The detectives also notice similarities that tie the H2OClick and Klepto homicides together. Joe learns from an undercover officer that the songwriter for H2OClick, a man named K-Ro, has gone missing, leading Joe to believe he is their murder witness. They struggle to track him down until they finally learn his real name, Oliver Robideaux, the son of former Motown singer Olivia Robideaux.

Meanwhile, Internal Affairs Lieutenant Bernard "Bennie" Macko arrives at the station. Macko and Joe have a bad history, as Joe embarrassed Macko after proving him wrong on a case years ago. The animosity is compounded by the fact that Joe's latest love interest, a psychic named Ruby, used to date Macko.

Macko is intent on ruining Joe, going so far as to try to frame him and place both detectives in interrogation. Instead, it only serves to help Joe and K.C. strengthen their partnership. Joe offers to help K.C. with the case of his father's death; Officer Danny Calden had been gunned down during a sting operation gone wrong, with his partner, Officer Leroy Wasley, being implicated but eventually released due to lack of evidence.

The partners track down K-Ro to his home, where Olivia professes her son's innocence and that Sartain was the real culprit. Sartain had been embezzling money from Klepto, H2OClick and other clients for years. Klepto and H2OClick discovered this and threatened to hire lawyers to nullify their contracts, which led Sartain to have his head of security hire the hitmen as a "lesson" to all his clients. Wasley is not only Sartain's security chief, but Macko is also in league with him.

When the partners cannot locate Sartain and Wasley, Joe enlists Ruby's help. She uses her psychic power to lead the two detectives to a clothing store. Just then, Sartain and Wasley happened to drive by, so Joe and K.C. follow in a wild car chase. It ends with the four men on foot, with two separate chases.

Wasley draws a gun on K.C. and loudly brags about having killed his father. K.C. uses his acting skills to distract and incapacitate Wasley, and reveals he had a tape recorder on the entire time. In a struggle with Joe, Sartain ends up falling from the top of a building to his death in a dumpster. Joe and K.C. reunite as LAPD officers swarm the scene. Macko appears and calls for the arrests of the partners, but instead he is arrested for his part in covering up Sartain and Wasley's crimes.

Joe and Ruby attend a production of A Streetcar Named Desire, in which K.C. is in a lead role. It is implied that Joe successfully brokered the real estate deal, and K.C. is giving his all in the pursuit of his acting dream. However, both of them receive calls from police headquarters and leave in the middle of the play, now solid partners.

== Cast ==
- Harrison Ford as Sergeant Joe Gavilan
- Josh Hartnett as Detective K.C. Calden
- Lena Olin as Ruby
- Bruce Greenwood as Lieutenant Bernard "Bennie" Macko
- Isaiah Washington as Antoine Sartain
- Lolita Davidovich as Cleo Ricard
- Keith David as Captain Leon
- Master P as Julius Armas
- Gladys Knight as Olivia Robidoux
- Lou Diamond Phillips as Wanda
- Meredith Scott Lynn as Detective Jackson
- James MacDonald as Danny Broome
- Tom Todoroff as Detective Zino
- Kurupt as Oliver "K-Ro" Robidoux
- André Benjamin as "Silk" Brown
- Alan Dale as Commander Preston
- Clyde Kusatsu as Coroner Chung
- Dwight Yoakam as Leroy Wasley
- Martin Landau as Jerry Duran
- K. D. Aubert as Shauntelle/Streetcar Blanche
- Eric Idle as The Celebrity
- Jennette McCurdy as The Van Family Daughter
- Eloy Casados as Detective Eddie Cruz
- Frank Sinatra Jr. as Marty Wheeler
- Robert Wagner as himself
- Anthony Mackie as "Joker", Killer
- Smokey Robinson as Cabbie

== Production ==
In April 2002, it was reported that Harrison Ford and Josh Hartnett were in talks to star in an untitled cop drama for Revolution Studios, which had been acquired from Ron Shelton as a pitch that he'd since written with Robert Souza and was also slated to direct.

The roles of Gavilan and Calden were originally given to John Travolta and Joseph Gordon-Levitt, respectively, before Harrison Ford and Josh Hartnett eventually signed on. Ford was looking for fresher material and UTA, the agency that had recently signed him, suggested it based on Ron Shelton's profile at the time. Joe Roth, the Revolution Studios Head, reportedly offered the role to Bruce Willis, with his producing partner Arnold Rifkin along to produce as well.

Throughout filming, Ford and Hartnett reportedly did not get along. Things apparently got so tense that the two wouldn't even look each other in the eye when sharing scenes together, with Ford calling Hartnett a "punk" while Hartnett responded by calling Ford an "old fart". They reportedly carried over the feud into the promotional tour for the film. Other reports from people on-set indicated that Hartnett was very reverential, and that he only signed on to the film because of Ford's involvement.

== Reception ==
On the review aggregator website Rotten Tomatoes, Hollywood Homicide holds an approval rating of 30% based on 161 reviews, and an average rating of 4.7/10. The site's critical consensus reads, "Hollywood Homicide suffers from too many subplots and not enough laughs." On Metacritic, the film has a weighted average score of 47 out of 100, based on 36 critics, indicating "mixed or average" reviews. Audiences polled by CinemaScore gave the film an average grade of "B" on an A+ to F scale.

Michael O'Sullivan of The Washington Post wrote, "Hollywood Homicide is a buddy film starring two people who, even as the closing credits roll, appear to have just met" and added "every scene between them, and that's most every scene, feels like a screen test or, at best, a rehearsal." One of the few major critics to give it a positive notice was Roger Ebert, who awarded the film 3 out of 4 stars and wrote "that it's more interested in its two goofy cops than in the murder plot; their dialogue redeems otherwise standard scenes." Bob Longino of The Atlanta Constitution gave the film a "C", describing it as "the opposite of L.A. Confidential, it's D.O.A., but it does have one good chase scene."

=== Box office ===
Hollywood Homicide did not perform well at the box office, earning a total gross that was lower than its $75 million budget. It ranked number 5 and grossed $11,112,632 in its opening weekend, coming in well below Rugrats Go Wild, Bruce Almighty, 2 Fast 2 Furious, and first-place holder Finding Nemo, the latter of which was in its third weekend. The film ended its box office run after 12 weeks, grossing $30,940,691 in Canada and the United States and $20,201,968 in other markets for a worldwide total of $51,142,659.

== Home media ==
Hollywood Homicide was released on VHS and DVD on October 7, 2003, by Columbia TriStar Home Entertainment. The DVD edition included a director's commentary, cast and crew profiles and a theatrical trailer. In 2013, Mill Creek Entertainment released the film for the first time on Blu-ray in a 2 pack set with Hudson Hawk, without any extra features.
