= Play It to the Bone =

- Theatrical release poster
- Directed by: Ron Shelton
- Written by: Ron Shelton
- Produced by: Stephen Chin; Kellie Davis; David V. Lester
- Starring: Woody Harrelson; Antonio Banderas; Lolita Davidovich; Tom Sizemore; Lucy Liu; Robert Wagner
- Cinematography: Mark Vargo
- Edited by: Patrick Flannery; Paul Seydor
- Music by: Alex Wurman
- Production company: Touchstone Pictures
- Distributed by: Buena Vista Pictures Distribution
- Release dates: December 25, 1999 (Limited); January 14, 2000 (United States)
- Running time: 124 minutes
- Country: United States
- Budget: $24 million
- Box office: $8.4 million

Play It to the Bone is a 1999 American sports comedy-drama film written and directed by Ron Shelton. It stars Woody Harrelson and Antonio Banderas as two boxers and best friends who travel together to Las Vegas to fight each other, with the winner receiving a match for the middleweight championship.

The film's supporting cast includes Lolita Davidovich, Tom Sizemore, Lucy Liu, and Robert Wagner. It was released by Buena Vista Pictures Distribution on December 25, 1999 in a limited release, before expanding to a wide release on January 14, 2000. The film was a critical and commercial failure, grossing $8.4 million against a $24 million budget.

== Plot ==
Aging prizefighters and longtime best friends Vince Boudreau and Cesar Dominguez always regretted not getting one last shot. Out of the blue, such an opportunity comes their way, but it is to fight each other. Boxing promoter Joe Domino has a problem on his hands. The fighters scheduled to be on his undercard in Las Vegas (a preliminary to a main event featuring heavyweight Mike Tyson) suddenly become unavailable at the last minute. He needs replacements fast, so a call is made to Los Angeles to see if Vince or Cesar would be available. Both are, and Domino decides to have them fight each other.

The boxers negotiate one condition: the winner will be given a chance to fight for the middleweight championship. Domino agrees, although the untrustworthy promoter is not necessarily a man of his word. Vince and Cesar have only a day to get to the fight. They decide to drive rather than fly, so they call upon their mutual friend and former shared love interest Grace to drive them. Grace's own plan is to pitch her various money-making ideas to Vegas bigshots like hotel and casino boss Hank Goody and raise venture capital. Along the way, they pick up a young, arrogant hitchhiker named Lia (Lucy Liu). Lia insults and challenges Grace, who knocks her out, leaving her cursing the trio as she hitches another ride with a trucker.

The fight between the two friends is sparsely attended, with ringside fans and celebrities remaining uninterested until the night's main event. Agreeing to at least give the fans a show, Vince and Cesar turn up the intensity and beat each other so savagely that the crowd and TV commentators begin to pay attention. When the action-packed bout comes to an end with no winner, Vince and Cesar are both paid well, but spend most of their money in the casinos. Grace also comes away bruised and empty-handed, though she is content that she has forged an everlasting friendship between two hard-headed but soft-hearted guys.

== Cast ==
- Woody Harrelson as Vince Boudreau
- Antonio Banderas as Cesar Dominguez
- Lolita Davidovich as Grace Pasic
- Tom Sizemore as Joe Domino
- Lucy Liu as Lia
- Robert Wagner as Hank Goody
- Richard Masur as Artie
- Willie Garson as "Cappie" Caplan
- Cylk Cozart as Rudy
- Jack Carter as Dante Solomon
- Aida Turturro as Mad Greek Waitress

The film also features many cameo appearances by people such as Steve Lawrence, Tony Curtis, Wesley Snipes, Mike Tyson, George Foreman, Kevin Costner, Rod Stewart, Jennifer Tilly, Natasha Gregson Wagner, James Woods, Drew Carey, Jacob Duran, World Boxing Council President José Sulaimán and Chuck Bodak.

== Reception ==
=== Critical response ===
Play It to the Bone garnered a generally poor reception. On the review aggregator website Rotten Tomatoes, 11% of 79 critics' reviews are positive. The website's consensus reads: "Flat characters and uninspired comedy yield forgettable results." Metacritic, which uses a weighted average, assigned the film a score of 32 out of 100, based on 33 critics, indicating "generally unfavorable" reviews. Audiences polled by CinemaScore gave the film an average grade of "D" on an A+ to F scale. Professional critical reception was similar, with Empire magazine giving it just 2 stars out of 5.

== See also ==
- List of boxing films
