= List of people from Chesterton, Indiana =

Notable natives and former residents of Chesterton, Indiana include:

== Academics ==
- Avery Craven, historian of nineteenth-century United States and the American Civil War

== Athletes ==
=== Baseball ===
- Bill Collins, outfielder in Major League Baseball
- Ron Kittle, former Major League Baseball player
- Mickey Morandini, former Major League Baseball player

=== Basketball ===
- Bob Dille, retired basketball player and championship high school coach
- Mitch McGary, star player from Chesterton who went to Michigan; led the team to the NCAA men's final in 2012–2013
- Zack Novak, former NCAA (University of Michigan) and professional basketball player (Landstede Basketball)
- Matt Nover, former professional basketball player and actor

=== Swimming ===
- Blake Pieroni, gold medalist swimmer and current Indiana University swimmer

=== Martial arts ===
- Eddie Wineland, MMA fighter with Ultimate Fighting Championship (bantamweight)

== Entertainers ==
- Jim Gaffigan, standup comedian and actor
- Taylor Zakhar Perez, actor
