= Lolita Davidovich =

Canadian actress (born 1961)

- Born: Lolita Davidović; July 15, 1961 (age 65); London, Ontario, Canada
- Other name: Lolita David
- Occupations: Actress, voice actress
- Years active: 1983–present
- Spouse: Ron Shelton (m. 1997)
- Children: 2

Lolita Davidovich (born Lolita Davidović; July 15, 1961) is a Canadian film and television actress, best known for portraying Blaze Starr in the 1989 film Blaze, for which she received a Chicago Film Critics Association Award nomination.

She later had starring roles in films including JFK (1991), Leap of Faith (1992), Raising Cain (1992), Boiling Point (1993), Intersection (1994), Cobb (1994), For Better or Worse (1995), Salt Water Moose (1996), Jungle 2 Jungle (1997), Gods and Monsters (1998), Mystery, Alaska (1999), and Play It to the Bone (1999).

== Early life ==
Davidovich was born in London, Ontario, the daughter of emigrants from the former Yugoslavia. Her father was from Belgrade (the capital of Serbia), and her mother was from Slovenia. She spoke only Serbian during her early years.

She studied at the Herbert Berghof Studio in New York.

== Career ==
Davidovich began her career playing small parts on television and films. She first received notice co-starring in comedy-drama film Blaze with Paul Newman, for which she beat out 600 other actresses for the title role of the burlesque performer Blaze Starr.

She later starred alongside John Malkovich and Andie MacDowell in 1991 film The Object of Beauty, before earning critical acclaim for her leading performance as an inmate in the HBO drama Prison Stories: Women on the Inside. Davidovich went on to leading roles in films such as the 1992 thriller Raising Cain directed by Brian De Palma, and the drama Leap of Faith, co-starring Steve Martin and Liam Neeson.

She played the love interest of Richard Gere in the 1994 drama Intersection. After starring for director Ron Shelton in Blaze, she also was featured in his films Cobb, Play It to the Bone, Dark Blue, Hollywood Homicide, and in the Oliver Stone film JFK. Davidovich also received Tokyo International Film Festival Award for Best Actress for Younger and Younger, and during 1990s had roles in films Boiling Point, For Better or Worse, Now and Then, Jungle 2 Jungle, Gods and Monsters and Mystery, Alaska.

In 2000s, Davidovich had supporting roles on both film and television. She appeared in several episodes on the first season of the Showtime lesbian-themed drama series, The L Word playing the character Francesca Wolff, and has guest-starred on CSI: Crime Scene Investigation, Criminal Minds, The Practice, Rizzoli & Isles, Cold Case, Psych, Curb Your Enthusiasm, and NCIS. Davidovich voiced Jester in the adventure video game Chronomaster, which also includes the voices of actors Ron Perlman and Brent Spiner. She also voiced Angel Gemini in the adventure game, Of Light and Darkness: The Prophecy, which also includes the voice of actor James Woods.

In 2015, Davidovich made her return to film playing the role of lead character's mother in the romantic drama The Longest Ride based on Nicholas Sparks' novel. Later that year, she was cast in the second season of HBO crime drama True Detective as Taylor Kitsch's character's mother, and ABC prime time soap opera Blood & Oil as Don Johnson's character's ex-wife.

Most recently, Davidovich appeared in a seven-episode arc as criminal Flutura Briscu on Law & Order: Organized Crime in 2021; and in the 2023 feature film Finestkind, written and directed by Brian Helgeland.

== Personal life ==
Davidovich is married to screenwriter and director Ron Shelton, who has directed Davidovich in several films, including Blaze, Dark Blue, Cobb, and Hollywood Homicide. They have two children, and reside in Ojai, California.

== Filmography ==
=== Film ===
Key
| † | Denotes films that have not yet been released |

| Year | Title | Role | Notes |
|---|---|---|---|
| 1983 | Class | 1st Girl (Motel) | |
| 1986 | Recruits | Susan | Credited as Lolita David |
| 1987 | Blindside | Adele | Credited as Lolita David |
| 1987 | Last Man Standing | Groupie | |
| 1987 | Adventures in Babysitting | LuAnn/Blonde | Credited as Lolita David |
| 1987 | The Pink Chiquitas | Pink Chiquita | |
| 1987 | The Big Town | Black Lace Stripper | |
| 1989 | Blaze | Blaze Starr | Nominated — Chicago Film Critics Association Award for Most Promising Actress |
| 1990 | Love & Murder | Barbara | |
| 1991 | The Object of Beauty | Joan | |
| 1991 | JFK | Beverly Oliver | Credited as Lolita Davidovitch |
| 1991 | The Inner Circle | Anastasia | |
| 1992 | Raising Cain | Dr. Jenny O'Keefe Nix | |
| 1992 | Leap of Faith | Marva | |
| 1993 | Boiling Point | Vikki Dunbar | |
| 1993 | Younger and Younger | Penny | Tokyo International Film Festival Award for Best Actress |
| 1994 | Intersection | Olivia Marshak | |
| 1994 | Cobb | Ramona | |
| 1995 | For Better or Worse | Valeri Carboni | |
| 1995 | Now and Then | Mrs. Albertson | |
| 1996 | Salt Water Moose | Eva Scofield | |
| 1997 | Touch | Antoinette Baker | |
| 1997 | Jungle 2 Jungle | Charlotte | |
| 1997 | Santa Fe | Eleanor Braddock | |
| 1998 | Gods and Monsters | Betty | |
| 1999 | Forever Flirt | | |
| 1999 | No Vacancy | Constance | |
| 1999 | Touched | Sylvie | |
| 1999 | Four Days | Chrystal | |
| 1999 | Mystery, Alaska | Mary Jane Pitcher | |
| 1999 | Play It to the Bone | Grace Pasic | |
| 2001 | Snow in August | Kate Devlin | |
| 2002 | Dark Blue | Sally Perry | |
| 2003 | Hollywood Homicide | Cleo Ricard | |
| 2006 | Bye Bye Benjamin | Janet | Short film |
| 2006 | Kill Your Darlings | Lola | |
| 2007 | September Dawn | Nancy Dunlap | |
| 2012 | Smitty | Judge Greenstein | |
| 2014 | Squatters | Evelyn | |
| 2015 | The Longest Ride | Kate Collins | |
| 2018 | Sorry for Your Loss | Eve | |
| 2023 | Finestkind | Donna Sykes | |

=== Television ===
| Year | Title | Role | Notes |
|---|---|---|---|
| 1981 | Three's Company | Kelly | Episode: "And Baby Makes Four" |
| 1985 | Two Fathers' Justice | | TV movie |
| 1987 | I'll Take Manhattan | | TV miniseries |
| 1987 | Adderly | Bubblebath Girl | Episode: "Midnight in Morocco" |
| 1987 | Night Heat | Cathy | Episode: "The Victim" |
| 1988 | Check It Out! | Kim Dillard | Episode: "Fatal Harassment" |
| 1989 | Friday the 13th: The Series | Christy | Episode: "Wedding Bell Blues" |
| 1990 | Uncut Gem | Ruby | TV movie |
| 1991 | Prison Stories: Women on the Inside | Loretta Wright | TV movie Nominated — CableACE Award for Best Actress in a Movie or Miniseries |
| 1992 | Keep the Change | Ellen Kelton | TV movie |
| 1994 | Trial at Fortitude Bay | Gina Antonelli | TV movie |
| 1994 | Duckman | Angela (voice) | Episode: "About Face" |
| 1995 | Indictment: The McMartin Trial | Kee McFarlane | TV movie Nominated — CableACE Award for Best Supporting Actress in a Movie or Miniseries |
| 1996 | Duckman | Angela (voice) | Episode: "Color of Naught" |
| 1996 | Jake's Women | Sheila | TV movie |
| 1996 | Harvest of Fire | Sally Russell | TV movie Nominated — Satellite Award for Best Actress – Miniseries or Television Film |
| 1997 | Dead Silence | Priss Gunder / Detective Sharon Foster | TV movie |
| 1997 | Perversions of Science | Various | Episode: "Dream of Doom" |
| 1998 | Stories from My Childhood | Christina (voice) | Episode: "The Twelve Months & The Snow Girl" |
| 2001 | Beggars and Choosers | Rebecca | Episodes: "Hitting the Bottle", "Golf War Syndrome" |
| 2001 | The Judge | Catherine Rosetti | TV movie |
| 2001 | Snow in August | Kate Devlin | TV movie |
| 2001 | The Kid | Mother (voice) | TV movie |
| 2002 | The Practice | Cassie Ray | Episode: "Bad to Worse" |
| 2002–2003 | The Agency | Avery Pohl | Recurring role (5 episodes) |
| 2003 | Monk | Natasha Lovara | Episode: "Mr. Monk Goes to the Circus" |
| 2003–2004 | The Guardian | Victoria Little | Episode: "Believe" e "The Bachelor Party" |
| 2004 | The L Word | Francesca Wolff | Recurring role (4 episodes) |
| 2005 | The Eleventh Hour | Veronica Taylor Ellery | Episode: "Kettle Black"; Nominated — Gemini Award for Best Performance by an Actress in a Guest Role Dramatic Series |
| 2005 | CSI: Crime Scene Investigation | Diane Dunn | Episode: "Unbearable" |
| 2007 | State of Mind | Cordelia Banks | Episode: "Snow Melts" |
| 2008 | Quarterlife | Mindy Krieger | Episode: "Finding a Voice" |
| 2009 | Criminal Minds | Sandra Lombardini | Episode: "Cold Comfort" |
| 2009 | ZOS: Zone of Separation | Mila Michailov | TV miniseries |
| 2009 | Throwing Stones | Marge Merrick | TV movie |
| 2009 | Curb Your Enthusiasm | Beverly | Episode: "Vehicular Fellatio" |
| 2009 | Cold Case | Molly Heaton (2009) | Episode: "Iced" |
| 2011 | Hound Dogs | Iris Hammer | TV movie |
| 2011 | Cinema Verite | Val | TV movie |
| 2011 | Rizzoli & Isles | Melody Patterson | Episodes: "Seventeen Ain't So Sweet", "Don't Stop Dancing, Girl" |
| 2012 | Psych | Ida Lane | Episode: "Santabarbaratown" |
| 2012 | Good God | Virginia Hailwood | Main role (8 episodes) |
| 2013 | Romeo Killer | Joan Porco | TV movie |
| 2013 | NCIS | Catherine Tavier | Episode: "Anonymous Was a Woman" |
| 2013 | Bunheads | Mrs. Simms | Episode: "Take the Vicuna" |
| 2015 | True Detective | Cynthia Woodrugh | 4 episodes |
| 2015 | Blood & Oil | Annie Briggs | 4 episodes |
| 2016 | Shades of Blue | Linda Wozniak | Season 1 |
| 2017 | Law & Order True Crime | Kitty Menendez | 8 episodes |
| 2018 | How to Get Away with Murder | Sandrine Castillo | 4 episodes; 1 uncredited |
| 2018 | Once Upon A Christmas Miracle | Judy Dempsey | Hallmark TV movie |
| 2019 | Good Witch | Autumn Delaney | 2 episodes |
| 2021 | Law & Order: Organized Crime | Flutura Briscu | Season 2: 7 episodes |
| 2023 | CSI: Vegas | Jeannette Folsom | Season 2: 3 episodes |

=== Video games ===
| Year | Title | Voice role |
|---|---|---|
| 1995 | Chronomaster | Jester |
| 1998 | Of Light and Darkness: The Prophecy | Angel Gemini |
