= For Better or Worse (film) =

- VHS cover
- Directed by: Jason Alexander
- Written by: Jeff Nathanson
- Produced by: David Rotman
- Starring: Jason Alexander; Lolita Davidovich; James Woods
- Cinematography: Wayne Kennan
- Edited by: Michael Jablow
- Music by: Miles Goodman
- Production company: Castle Rock Entertainment
- Distributed by: Columbia Pictures
- Release date: March 19, 1995
- Running time: 105 minutes
- Country: United States
- Language: English
- Box office: $41,628

For Better or Worse is a 1995 American comedy-drama film written by Jeff Nathanson and directed by Jason Alexander, who stars alongside Lolita Davidovich and James Woods. The film was given a limited theatrical release, and aired on TNT in 1996.

== Plot ==
Michael Makeshift is a lonely, sad man who can't get over the fact his fiancée dumped him. He regularly attends various support groups to meet people. To make matters worse, his landlord is beginning to bug him for long-overdue rent.

It seems that things for Michael's brother Reggie are much better. A con, he regularly dupes his family, all of whom are oblivious except for Michael. He appears on his doorstep, newly married to Valerie. Reggie asks him to look after her, who's puzzled when she awakes at Michael's apartment after Reggie left her there whilst she was drunk and unconscious.

Valerie also does not know that Reggie has paid Michael for the favor, while he 'takes care of some business'. Disoriented when she wakes up, Valerie slowly warms to Michael.

Despite his well-laid plans to rob the credit union where his own mother works, things go badly for Reggie. His henchmen mutiny and force him to reveal that the clueless Valerie carries the security codes they need to pull off the job in her suitcase.

A chase ensues. While Michael helps Valerie escape, he reveals the truth about Reggie. At the same time, she becomes increasingly attracted to her new protector. Staying overnight in his dad's now closed hardware store, Reggie's henchmen find her, forcing her and Reggie to hit the credit union.

In the end, the henchmen are arrested, Reggie and Michael are released, and the latter and Valerie (who hadn't married Reggie after all) declare their mutual love and kiss.

== Cast ==
- Jason Alexander as Michael Makeshift
- Lolita Davidovich as Valeri Carboni
- James Woods as Reggie Makeshift
- Joe Mantegna as Stone
- Jay Mohr as Dwayne
- Robert Costanzo as Ranzier
- Bea Arthur as Beverly Makeshift (Uncredited) Arthur refused to receive a screen credit for this film.
- Eda Reiss Merin as Rose
- John Amos as Gray
- Rob Reiner as Dr. Plosner
- Haley Joel Osment as Danny
- Tiffany Salerno as Cindy
- Beau Gravitte as Bob
- Una Damon as the Bartender
- Jerry Adler as Morton Makeshift
- Rip Torn as Captain Cole
- Steven Wright as Cabbie

== Release ==
=== Box office ===
The film was first shown in the United States on March 19, 1995, and in the UK on 29 December 1995. On 1 April 1997, the film premiered in Italy and in Hungary too on 20 May 1997. In Sweden, the film first received a TV premier on 1 August 2004. The film grossed $25,912 on its opening weekend in the USA across 24 screens before totaling $40,622 by the end of March.

=== Critical reception ===
Iotis Erlewine of Allmovie gave the film two out of five stars. Both Video Movie Guide 2002 and Video Source Book gave the film two out of five stars as well.

In 2004, Vince Leo of Qwipster.net gave an unfavorable review, stating: "Not exactly the directorial debut that Seinfeld favorite Jason Alexander would have hoped for, For Better or Worse is little more than a ninety-minute collection of strained situations and unfunny moments. The problems start early, as it is just a bad idea for a romantic comedy to begin with, and it certainly doesn't help that Jeff Nathanson can't inject anything fresh into it. For Better or Worse isn't devoid of comedy, as it did occasionally make me chuckle, but not nearly enough as it made me annoyed. For Better or Worse is a rhetorical proposition, as all Alexander delivers is worse and worse. Unless you find him completely irresistible, there's not much going for this inept misfire."

The Atlanta Journal-Constitution reviewed the film upon release, giving a rating of two and a half stars out of four, noting: "Exceedingly strange comedy wavers between hilarity and "huh?". For Better or Worse just strange enough for cable."

=== Home media ===
Following its release, For Better or Worse remained out-of-print and only available on VHS, although, in recent years, it is available as a download via iTunes and on Amazon via Instant Video. In 1996, Home Video Hellas released the film on VHS in Greece, whilst LK-TEL Vídeo released it on the same format in Brazil. In 1996, Turner Home Entertainment released the film in America on VHS. Sony Pictures Home Entertainment released the film in the UK in 1999, where it featured slightly different artwork to the American release.
