= Blaze (1989 film) =

1989 American film by Ron Shelton

- Theatrical release poster
- Directed by: Ron Shelton
- Screenplay by: Ron Shelton
- Based on: Blaze Starr: My Life as Told to Huey Perry by Blaze Starr; Huey Perry
- Produced by: Gil Friesen; Dale Pollock
- Starring: Paul Newman; Lolita Davidovich
- Cinematography: Haskell Wexler
- Edited by: Robert Leighton; Michael King (uncredited)
- Music by: Bennie Wallace
- Production companies: Touchstone Pictures; Silver Screen Partners IV; A&M Films
- Distributed by: Buena Vista Pictures Distribution
- Release date: December 13, 1989
- Running time: 117 minutes
- Country: United States
- Language: English
- Budget: $22 million
- Box office: $19,131,246

Blaze is a 1989 American comedy-drama film written and directed by Ron Shelton, based on the 1974 memoir Blaze Starr: My Life as Told to Huey Perry by Blaze Starr and Huey Perry. The film stars Paul Newman as Earl Long and Lolita Davidovich as Blaze Starr.

At the 62nd Academy Awards in 1990, the film received a nomination for Best Cinematography for Haskell Wexler. It was Wexler's fifth and final nomination, previously winning for Who's Afraid of Virginia Woolf? (1966) and Bound for Glory (1976).

== Plot ==
Fannie Belle Fleming moves from rural West Virginia to Washington, D.C. in the hopes of becoming a singer. Promoter Red Snyder convinces her to strip during a performance. She becomes successful burlesque performer Blaze Starr and catches the eye of Louisiana governor Earl Long. He invites her to a dinner party with his colleagues. She accompanies him to campaign stops. He brings her to his house, where he suffers erectile dysfunction, so she sings to him until he is able to perform.

Long's staff don't support his relationship with Blaze or his civil rights policies, including his opposition to literacy tests for voters of color. He pontificates in the Louisiana state house, which is against the rules, and is confined to a state mental hospital in Mandeville.

After Long's release, he speaks at a campaign rally. His staff convinces Blaze to break up with Long. She visits her family. Long loses the gubernatorial primary election. He makes a scene at Blaze's club, and they reconcile. Long proposes marriage. Blaze convinces Long to run for congress. He wins the election but dies of a heart attack. Blaze places a rose in his casket and moves to Baltimore, Maryland.

== Cast ==
- Paul Newman as Earl Long
- Lolita Davidovich as Blaze Starr
- Jerry Hardin as Thibodeaux
- Gailard Sartain as LaGrange
- Jeffrey DeMunn as Eldon Tuck
- Richard Jenkins as Picayune
- Brandon Smith as Arvin Deeter
- Robert Wuhl as Red Snyder
- James Harper as Willie Rainach
- Rod Masterson as Alexandria Daily Town Talk Reporter

== Reception ==
The film received mixed reviews from critics. On the review aggregator website Rotten Tomatoes, 75% of 12 critics' reviews are positive. Metacritic, which uses a weighted average, assigned the film a score of 67 out of 100, based on 17 critics, indicating "generally favorable" reviews. Audiences surveyed by CinemaScore gave the film a "B+" on scale of A+ to F.

=== Box office ===
Blaze debuted at number 9 at the North American box office on its opening weekend.
