= Dale Pollock =

American film producer

- Born: 1950 (age 75–76); Cleveland, Ohio, U.S.
- Education: Brandeis University; San Jose State University
- Occupations: Film producer; film professor; writer

Dale M. Pollock (born 1950) is an American film producer, writer and film professor. A journalist whose works have been published in a number of magazines and newspapers, Pollock is also the author of a biography of George Lucas. Pollock has produced thirteen feature films, one of which (Blaze) received an Academy Award nomination for Cinematography. He was Professor of Cinema Studies at the University of North Carolina School of the Arts from January 2007 to December 2019. He served as Interim Dean from January 1 to July 31, 2021, and is currently emeritus professor in the School of Filmmaking.

== Personal life ==
A native of Cleveland, Ohio, Pollock graduated from Shaker Heights High School in 1968. He later obtained a B.A. in anthropology from Brandeis University and an M.S. in communications from San Jose State University. Pollock is married to fiddle player Susie O'Keeffe Pollock. His children are Owen Pollock, Leo Pollock and Zoe Di Novi.

== Writing ==
An excerpt of Pollock's Master of Science thesis, "The Use of Media in a Political Campaign", was published in 1975 in Daily Variety's 42nd Anniversary Issue. Pollock's entry into journalism was as entertainment editor at the Santa Cruz Sentinel in Santa Cruz, CA. Subsequently, he joined the staff of Daily Variety in Los Angeles becoming Film Critic and Box Office Analyst, before moving to the Los Angeles Times where he became Chief Film Reporter in the Calendar, Business, Metro and Editorial sections. In addition, he has published in Life, Esquire, People Weekly, and in the Daily Variety AFI Life Achievement Award Tribute to George Lucas. In 1983, his biography of George Lucas, Skywalking: The Life and Films of George Lucas, was published. An updated version was published by Samuel French Trade in 1990 and a further updated edition in 1999 by Da Capo Press. In 2008, Pollock began writing a monthly audio book column for the Winston Salem Journal. Pollock's essay on the Billy Wilder film Five Graves to Cairo was published in the book Billy Wilder, Movie-Maker: Critical Essays on the Films edited by Karen McNall. Pollock's first novel, Chopped: A Novel, a vintage crime novel about the infamous Webster-Parkman trial in 1850 Boston, was published in March, 2023.

== Film career ==
In 1985, Pollock joined The David Geffen Company as a development executive. He joined A&M Films a year later as vice president in charge of production, and was named president in 1990, producing such films as A Midnight Clear, Blaze, and Mrs. Winterbourne. Pollock founded and ran his own film company, Peak Productions, for ten years, producing Set It Off in 1996, among other films.

== Teaching ==
Pollock's career at the University of North Carolina School of the Arts in Winston-Salem, N.C. began in 1999, when he became Dean of the School of Filmmaking. He held the position until 2006, when he became a professor in Cinema Studies. He had previously taught at the Peter Stark Graduate Program at the University of Southern California, the School of Professional Writing at the University of Southern California, Salem College, and the American Film Institute where he was co-chair of the Producing Program.

During his tenure as dean at the School of Filmmaking, he launched the CinEthics Conference in 2000 and in 2003 brought the RiverRun International Film Festival from Brevard, NC to Winston-Salem. He served as its executive director of the latter until the end of 2006, when he became chairman of the board of directors. Pollock received the title of professor emeritus in December 2019. Pollock served as Interim Dean of the School of Filmmaking for the Spring semester, from January through July 2021.

== Public appearances ==
Pollock has appeared on several national news programs, including Dateline NBC, Nightline, and National Public Radio's Morning Edition. He has presented workshops on film producing and film ethics and has moderated several panels at major film festivals, including Karlovy Vary International Film Festival, Nashville Film Festival, Boston Film Festival and Palm Springs International Film Festival. From 2009 to 2019, Pollock appeared weekly on WXII TV Channel 12 as their film critic, beginning again in 2022.

== Filmography ==
He was a producer in all films unless otherwise noted.

=== Film ===
Year	Film	Credit
1988	The Beast	Executive producer
1989	The Mighty Quinn	
1989	Worth Winning	
1989	Blaze	
1991	Crooked Hearts	
1992	A Midnight Clear	
1993	House of Cards	
1993	A Home of Our Own	
1994	S.F.W.	
1996	Mrs. Winterbourne	
1996	Set It Off	
1998	Meet the Deedles	
1999	Bats	Executive producer

Thanks

Year	Film	Role
2000	George Washington	Thanks
