= Ron Shelton =

American film director and screenwriter

- Born: Ronald Wayne Shelton; September 15, 1945 (age 81); Whittier, California, U.S.
- Occupations: Film director, screenwriter
- Spouse(s): Lois Shelton (divorced) Lolita Davidovich (m. 1997)
- Children: 4

Ronald Wayne Shelton (born September 15, 1945) is an American film director and screenwriter and former minor league baseball infielder. Shelton is known for the many films he has made about sports. His 1988 film Bull Durham, based in part on his own baseball experiences, earned him an Academy Award nomination for Best Original Screenplay.

A former minor league baseball infielder in the Baltimore Orioles' farm system, Shelton played with the Bluefield Orioles, Stockton Ports, Florida Instructional League Orioles, Dallas–Fort Worth Spurs, and Rochester Red Wings from 1967 through 1971.

== Film career ==
After working on the scripts for a number of films, including co-writing the Nick Nolte and Gene Hackman political drama Under Fire, Shelton made his directorial debut with Bull Durham in 1988. Set in the world of minor league baseball, the romantic comedy stars Kevin Costner, Susan Sarandon and Tim Robbins. Shelton's screenplay netted him multiple awards, including Best Original Script from the Writers Guild of America and Best Script from the US National Society of Film Critics. It was also nominated for an Academy Award. In 2022, Shelton's book The Church of Baseball: The Making of Bull Durham: Home Runs, Bad Calls, Crazy Fights, Big Swings, and a Hit was published by Vintage Books.

In 1990, Ron Shelton received a three-year first look writing and producing deal with 20th Century Fox.

Shelton worked with Costner again on the 1996 golf-themed romantic comedy Tin Cup. Other films as writer and director included the boxing comedy Play It to the Bone, a critical and commercial flop, and the acclaimed 1992 comedy White Men Can't Jump, starring Woody Harrelson and Wesley Snipes as two basketball hustlers. Calling the latter film "very smart and very funny," and "not simply a basketball movie," critic Roger Ebert wrote that Shelton "knows how his characters talk and sound, and how they get into each other's minds with nonstop taunting and boasting."

Shelton has also written and directed two biopics: Cobb, in which Tommy Lee Jones portrayed record-breaking baseball player Ty Cobb, and Blaze, which starred Paul Newman as Louisiana Governor Earl Long. Parts of Cobb were filmed at Rickwood Field, leading to its restoration. Shelton wrote or co-wrote other sports-themed films including The Best of Times, starring Robin Williams and Kurt Russell as former football teammates; the basketball drama Blue Chips, starring Nick Nolte, and a boxing comedy, The Great White Hype, starring Samuel L. Jackson.

He also directed two Los Angeles-based crime films, Dark Blue, a drama starring Kurt Russell, and Hollywood Homicide, a comedy with Harrison Ford and Josh Hartnett.

In 2022, Shelton received the Leonard Maltin Award at the Coronado Island Film Festival.

== Personal life ==
Shelton grew up in Montecito, California, the oldest of four brothers. He is an alumnus of Santa Barbara High School and of the University of Arizona and Westmont College. Shelton's brother is architect Jeff Shelton.

Shelton is married to Canadian-born actress Lolita Davidovich, who has appeared in several of his films, including taking the title role of Blaze Starr in Blaze. The couple have two children and reside in Los Angeles and Ojai, California. Shelton has two daughters with his first wife, filmmaker Lois Shelton.

On July 7, 2017, Shelton was inducted into the Rochester Red Wings Hall of Fame.

== Filmography ==
Year	Title	Director	Writer
1983	Under Fire	2nd unit	Yes
1986	The Best of Times	2nd unit	Yes
1988	Bull Durham	Yes	Yes
1989	Blaze	Yes	Yes
1992	White Men Can't Jump	Yes	Yes
1994	Blue Chips	No	Yes
1994	Cobb	Yes	Yes
1996	The Great White Hype	No	Yes
1996	Tin Cup	Yes	Yes
1999	Play It to the Bone	Yes	Yes
2002	Dark Blue	Yes	No
2003	Hollywood Homicide	Yes	Yes
2003	Bad Boys II	No	Yes
2011	Hound Dogs	Yes	Yes
2017	Just Getting Started	Yes	Yes

Associate

- The Pursuit of D.B. Cooper (1981) (Also creative consultant)

Executive producer

- Blue Chips (1994)
- Open Season (1995)
- No Vacancy (1999)
- Hound Dogs (2011)
- Spaceman (2016)

Special thanks

- Welcome to Hollywood (1998)
- Bad Reputation (2005)
