= Chuck Bodak =

American boxing trainer, cutman (1916–2009)

Vasil "Chuck" Bodak (June 3, 1916 – February 6, 2009) was an American boxing cutman and trainer who worked with over 50 world champions including Muhammad Ali, Rocky Marciano, Tommy Hearns, Julio César Chávez, Evander Holyfield and Oscar De La Hoya. He was known for his trademark headbands with photos of his fighters as well as his handmade jewelry and collages that he liked to give away as gifts.

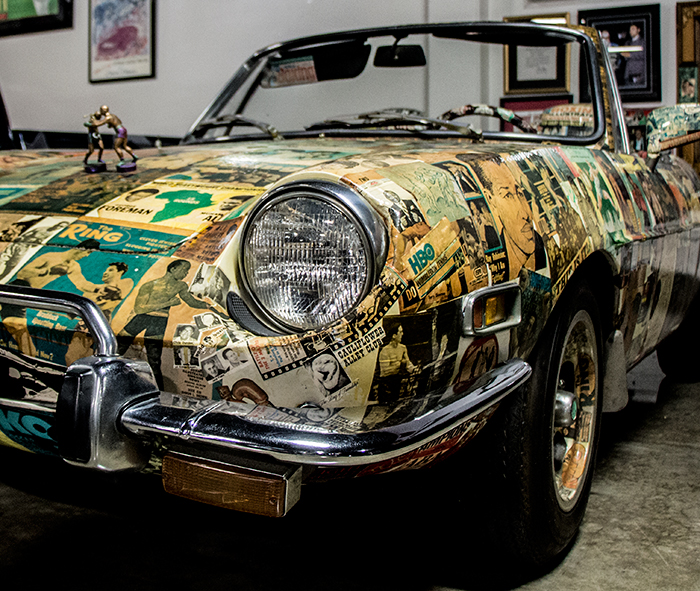
Chuck Bodak's Fiat housed at the Marconi Automotive Museum

== Life and career ==
Bodak was born June 3, 1916, in Gary, Indiana where his involvement in boxing began circa 1929 at Schonfield's Athletic Club. In 1942 he enlisted in the U.S. Army. He survived the Battle of the Bulge after being shot twice and was awarded two Purple Hearts. An amateur fighter himself, Bodak coached the National Golden Gloves team in the late 1950s and began working with young teenager named Cassius Clay who changed his name to Muhammad Ali. Bodak trained Ali for the last four years of his amateur career that culminated with the winning of a Gold Medal for the light-heavyweight competition at the 1960 Summer Olympic Games held in Rome, Italy.

Bodak moved to Chicago, Illinois in 1958 where he was a boxing coach for the Catholic Youth Organization (CYO) for many years before moving to California. Even though advancing in age, he continued to work in the ring and was active in the boxing community until he suffered a stroke in 2007 at the age of 90. He died in a motor vehicle accident on February 6, 2009, at the age of 92 in Orange County, California.

== Awards and recognition ==
Bodak was inducted into the World Boxing Hall of Fame, "Expanded Category" (Managers & Trainers).

In October 2008, he received a Lifetime Achievement Award in person at a WBC Legends of Boxing Museum ceremony.

In 1993, he was honored by the Cauliflower Alley Club.

== Bibliography ==
Bodak co-authored Boxing Basics, a book published in 1979 that outlines the fundamentals of boxing including psychological preparation, physical conditioning, offensive and defensive strategies, and ring psychology.

== Acting roles ==
Bodak played the role of Cesar's cutman in the 1999 film Play It to the Bone and portrayed himself in two documentaries, More Than Famous in 2003 and The Distance in 2006.
