= Blue Chips =

1994 film by William Friedkin

- Theatrical release poster
- Directed by: William Friedkin
- Written by: Ron Shelton
- Produced by: Ron Shelton
- Starring: Nick Nolte; Mary McDonnell; Ed O'Neill; J. T. Walsh; Alfre Woodard; Shaquille O'Neal
- Cinematography: Tom Priestly Jr.
- Edited by: Robert K. Lambert
- Music by: Jeff Beck; Nile Rodgers
- Distributed by: Paramount Pictures
- Release date: February 18, 1994
- Running time: 108 minutes
- Country: United States
- Language: English
- Budget: $35.0 Million
- Box office: $26 million

Blue Chips is a 1994 American sports drama film, directed by William Friedkin, written by Ron Shelton and starring Nick Nolte as a college basketball coach trying to recruit a winning team. His players were portrayed by actors as well as real-life basketball stars Shaquille O'Neal and Anfernee "Penny" Hardaway and cameos include noted basketball figures Bob Knight, Rick Pitino, George Raveling, Bob Cousy, Larry Bird, Jerry Tarkanian, Matt Painter, Allan Houston, Dick Vitale, Jim Boeheim, Dan Dakich and Bobby Hurley, as well as actor Louis Gossett Jr. While the film was released to mixed reviews, general assessment of Blue Chips has become more favorable in the decades since, and it has been listed as one of the best sports movies of all time by Rolling Stone, Yardbarker and The Athletic.

== Plot ==
Pete Bell, the head coach of the Western University Dolphins basketball team in Los Angeles, faces mounting pressure as the program struggles to maintain its previous success and recruit top prospects. As he seeks to attract highly regarded high school players, Bell becomes increasingly aware of allegations that some competing college programs are providing improper financial incentives to recruits.

This practice is prohibited in college games, but Pete decides to use it following a losing season. A school booster named Happy manages the recruitment of several high-school players for Western’s next season with the coach’s approval. These recruitments include offering a new car to Neon Boudeaux, a house and a job to Butch McRae’s mother, and a tractor and a bag of money to Ricky Roe’s father.

With sportswriter Ed suspecting a scandal, Pete continues to be contaminated by demands from the players and a dirty association with the booster. His ex-wife, a former guidance counselor, agrees to tutor Neon, who has below average grades, but she feels betrayed when she realizes Pete lied to her about the new athletes receiving illegal inducements to attend the school.

Pete realizes that one of his senior players, Tony, a personal favorite, had "shaved points" in a game his freshman season to beat a gambling point spread, after carefully reviewing a video of a freshman season game depicting Tony's unusual behavior. Pete is disgusted at what he and his program have become.

Western University has a big nationally televised game coming up versus Indiana, the #1 team in the country, coached by Bob Knight. After winning the game, Pete cannot bear the guilt of having cheated. At a press conference, he confesses to the entire scandal and resigns as head coach. Leaving the press conference and the arena, Pete walks past a playground with kids playing basketball. He approaches and helps coach them.

An epilogue later reveals that the university would be suspended from tournament play for three years. Pete did continue to coach, but at the high school level, Tony graduated and played pro ball in Europe, Ricky Roe got injured and returned home to run the family farm, and Neon and Butch dropped out of college but both now play in the NBA.

== Cast ==
- Nick Nolte as Coach Pete Bell
- Mary McDonnell as Jenny Bell
- J. T. Walsh as "Happy" Kuykendahl
- Ed O'Neill as Ed Axelby
- Alfre Woodard as Lavada McRae, Butch's mother
- Anfernee "Penny" Hardaway as Butch McRae
- Matt Nover as Ricky Roe
- Robert Wuhl as Marty
- Shaquille O'Neal as Neon Boudeaux
- Bob Cousy as Vic Roker
- Cylk Cozart as "Slick"
- Anthony C. Hall as Tony
- Kevin Benton as Jack
- Bill Cross as Freddie
- Marques Johnson as Mel
- Larry Bird as himself
- Jim Beaver as Ricky's Dad
- Louis Gossett Jr. as Father Dawkins (uncredited)
- Nigel Miguel as Dolphin Player

As well, a number of players, coaches and sportscasters had cameo appearances as themselves, including:

- Bob Knight
- Jerry Tarkanian
- Jim Boeheim
- Kevin Garnett
- Allan Houston
- Dick Vitale
- Todd Donoho
- Rick Pitino (credited as Richard Pitino)
- George Lynch
- Calbert Cheaney
- Bobby Hurley
- Eric Anderson
- Greg Graham
- Joe Hillman
- Keith Smart
- Matt Painter

== Production ==
Blue Chips had been in development since 1981 when Ron Shelton developed the project at Time Life Films. The project languished in development hell being bounced from Time Life to MGM and followed by 20th Century Fox where then studio head, Joe Roth, put the script into Turnaround right before White Men Can't Jump opened to commercial and critical success. Roth attempted to get the script back only for it to be too late when Paramount Pictures acquired the script under Brandon Tartikoff's tenure as chairman and was nearly placed into turnaround again with Sherry Lansing credited with getting the script back at Paramount due to her enthusiasm for the project and also getting it greenlit. William Friedkin had long wanted to do a basketball film and was introduced to the project by Lansing who was his wife. Blue Chips was Friedkin's first film for Paramount since 1977's Sorcerer, the production of which had strained his relationship with the studio for years. His next three films would also be released by Paramount. Some attributed this to his relationship with Lansing. Friedkin and Shelton had come close to working together on That Championship Season a decade prior until both left the project. Shelton felt that Friedkin's enthusiasm for the sport as well as his prowess as a filmmaker made him a good choice for directing the film, which Shelton himself couldn't as he was tied up with writing and directing duties on Cobb. Tates Locke claimed that the movie was actually inspired by his 1982 book Caught in the Net, which he had co-wrote with Bob Ibach that had detailed Locke's transgressions as a college basketball head coach, primarily during his time at Clemson.

Blue Chips was filmed in Frankfort, Indiana (arena interior) and French Lick, Indiana, as well as in Chicago and New Orleans and in Los Angeles on the campus of the University of Southern California.

== Reception ==
The film earned mixed reviews from critics. On the review aggregator website Rotten Tomatoes, 40% of 30 critics' reviews are positive, with an average rating of 5.1/10. The website's consensus reads: "Director William Friedkin is working with a strong cast, but an excess of sentimentality renders this basketball drama more than a little flat."

Hal Hinson of The Washington Post panned the film, writing, "The ostensible subject here is the big business of college athletics, and, just as The Program tried to do with college football, the film's purpose is to expose the corruption behind the scenes of so-called amateur athletics that have transformed the sport into a desperate money grab. But, like The Program, this strident, unconvincing bit of movie muckraking uses our national sports mania to decoy us into sitting through a dreary lecture about ethics and moral corner-cutting. What's most surprising here is that the assembled talent—from the worlds of basketball and movies—is so impressive and, still, the work is so tired. As the coach who exchanges his soul for a winning program, Nick Nolte struts and bellows in a desperate attempt to bring his character to life, and though he works up quite a lather, all he gets for the effort is sweat stains."

Roger Ebert however gave the film three stars. "The movie contains a certain amount of basketball, but for once here's a sports movie where everything doesn't depend on who wins the big game," he wrote. "It's how they win it. [..] What Friedkin brings to the story is a tone that feels completely accurate; the movie is a morality play, told in the realistic, sometimes cynical terms of modern high-pressure college sports."

In the years since the film was released, it has received more positive reviews. Since 2020, Rolling Stone, Yardbarker and The Athletic listed it as one of the best sports movies of all time. Friedkin (and several others related to the production) participated in an article detailing the history of the film in 2019 for Sports Illustrated.

In 2023, Jason Diamond of Esquire wrote a favorable review of the film, writing "Blue Chips suffered because it was ahead of its time." and "Eventually, a new generation that had read none of the bad reviews (nor would probably care about them) discovered Blue Chips. It is frequently counted among the best sports movies ever made and earned new accolades in 2019 when media outlets did 25th anniversary retrospectives." The same year, Jason Guerrasio of Business Insider listed it as one of the 35 sports movies to watch in your lifetime.

=== Accolades ===
Shaquille O'Neal was nominated for a Razzie Award for "Worst New Star". The film ranked No. 3 on Complex Magazine's Best Basketball Movies list.

=== Box office ===
The film debuted at number 3 at the US box office. It went on to gross $23 million in the United States and Canada but only $3.7 million international for a worldwide total of $26.7 million.

Friedkin later admitted the film was "weak at the box office. It's hard to capture in a sports film the excitement of a real game, with its own unpredictable dramatic structure and suspense. I couldn't overcome that."

=== Year-end lists ===
- Dishonorable mention – Glenn Lovell, San Jose Mercury News

== See also ==
- List of basketball films
