= Jeff Shelton =

Architect

- Born: 1958 (age 67–68); Santa Barbara, CA
- Education: University of Arizona, Tucson
- Website: jeffsheltonarchitect.com

Jeff Shelton is an architect from Santa Barbara, California, with a "whimsical unique" architectural style.

== Early life and education ==
Shelton and his three brothers grew up on a section of the Oakleigh property in Montecito, CA. The land was in the wooded surroundings of Westmont College, where his father was the Alumni Director. The estate was previously used as a prep school and the family occupied the old classrooms, library, and infirmary. Shelton did not live in a conventional home until college. Oakleigh was near the bohemian enclave of Mountain Drive, where many homes were designed by architect Frank Robinson, Shelton's mentor.

Shelton graduated from the University of Arizona, Tucson, with a B. Arch in 1983.

== Career ==
Shelton designs everything, including the light fixtures, furniture, textiles, tiles, and iron work. His buildings conform to the distinctive Santa Barbara style, yet are also unquestioningly his own.

Shelton surrounds himself with what he calls his "merry band of artisans": contractors, craftspeople, engineers, artists, plumbers, sculptors, stone masons, electricians, woodworkers, glassblowers, and welders. Without them, and his clients, his pencil drawings would stay on the paper. Shelton has collaborated with his team on over 60 residential, commercial, and mixed-use projects.

Shelton and his projects have been featured in various magazines, websites, and journals, including Dwell, Architectural Digest, the Los Angeles Times, and others.

Shelton's first public works project was as architectural consultant on the 2024 redesign of the 101 freeway underpass in downtown Santa Barbara.

Shelton is the author of the 2021 book titled "The Fig District".

== Awards ==
Year	Award	Citation
2024	North Street Book Prize	
2024, 2023, 2022, 2021, 2020, 2019	Santa Barbara Independent Best Of Award	
2013	Santa Barbara Beautiful Award	
2003	George Washington Smith Award	
2002	Sunset Magazine Western Home Award	

== Gallery ==
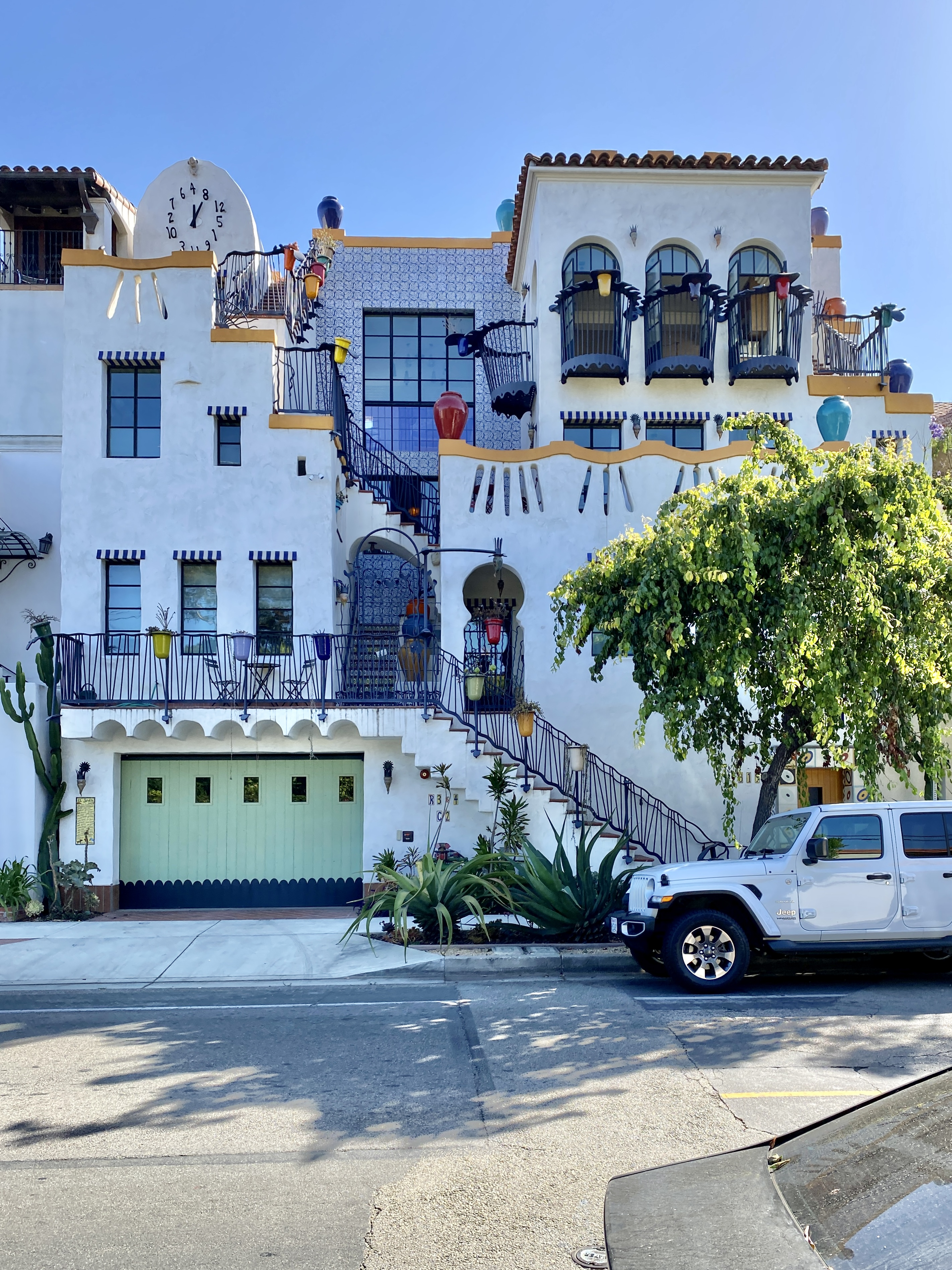
El Jardin, Garden Street, Santa Barbara, CA

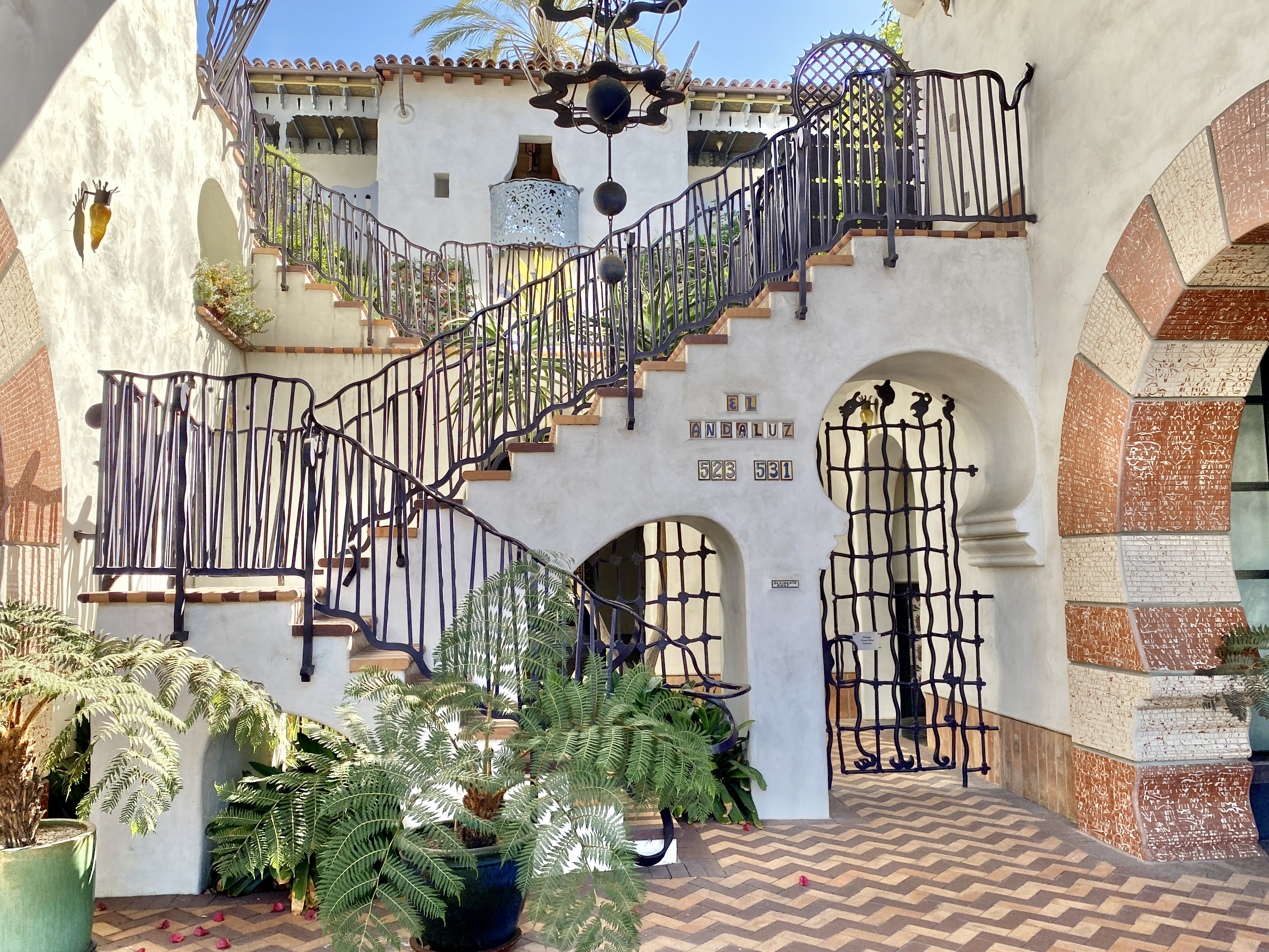
El Andaluz, Chapala Street, Santa Barbara, CA

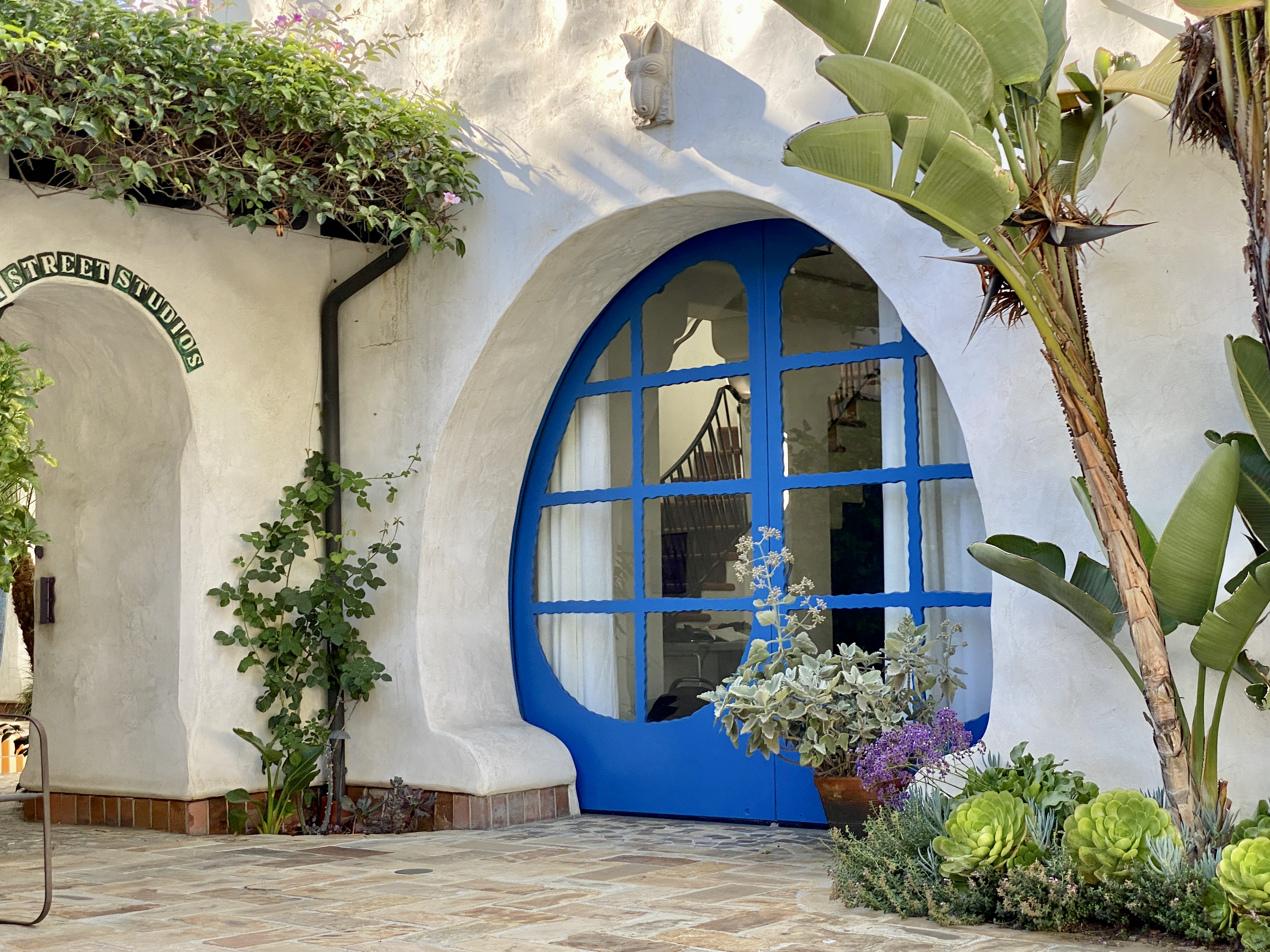
Cota Street Studios, Cota Street, Santa Barbara, CA

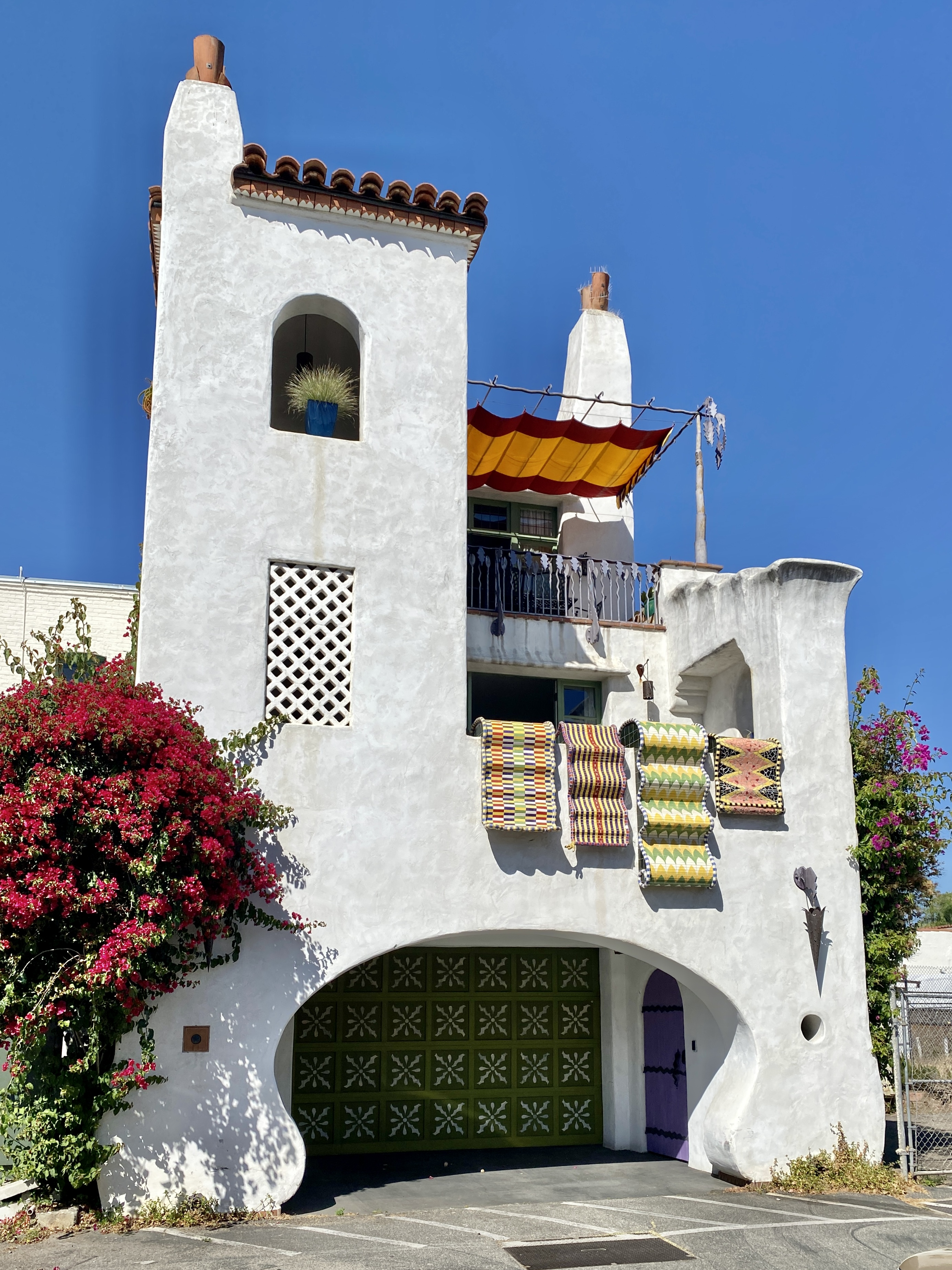
Pistachio House, Gutierrez Street, Santa Barbara, CA

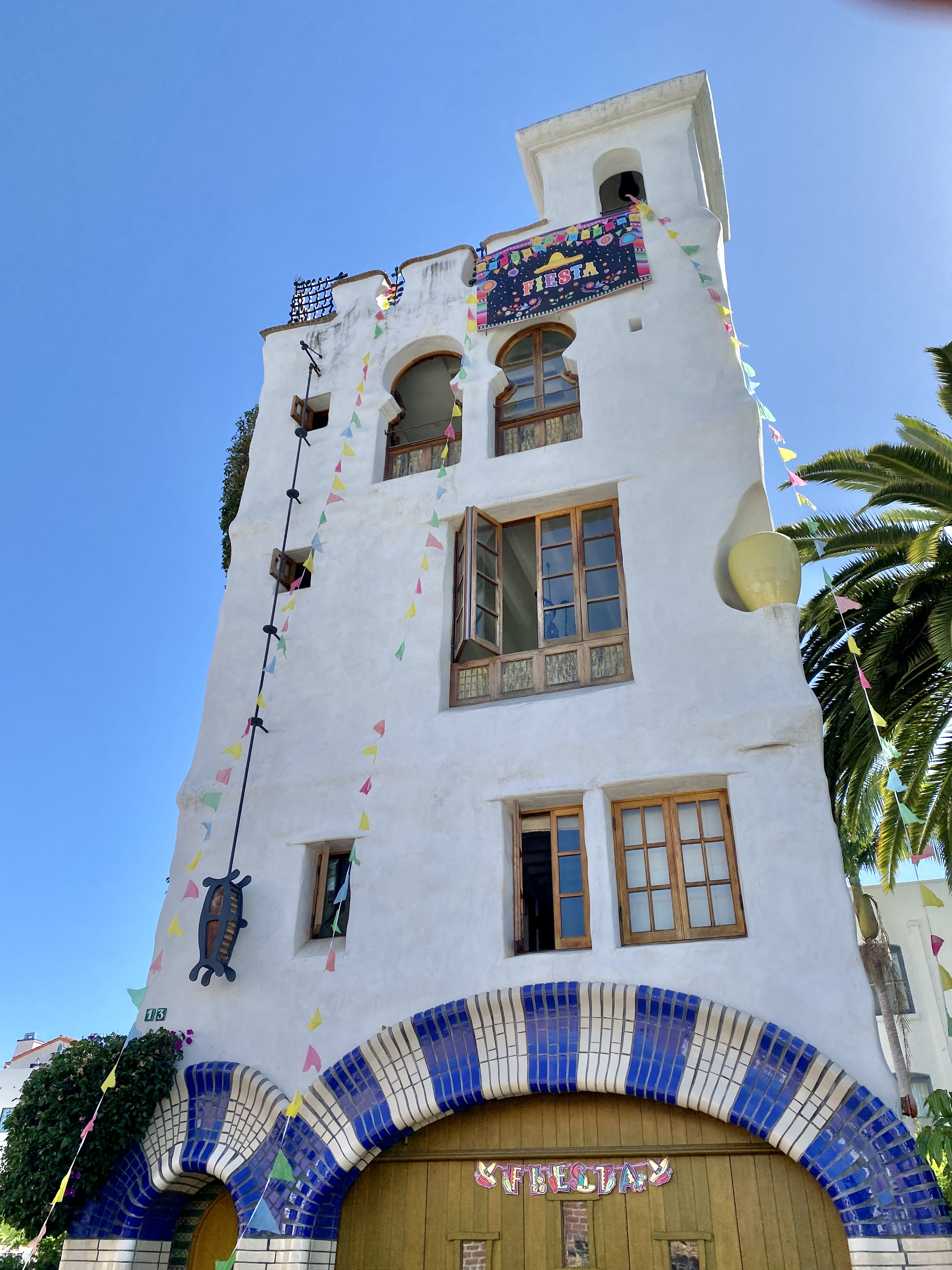
Ablitt House, Haley Street, Santa Barbara, CA

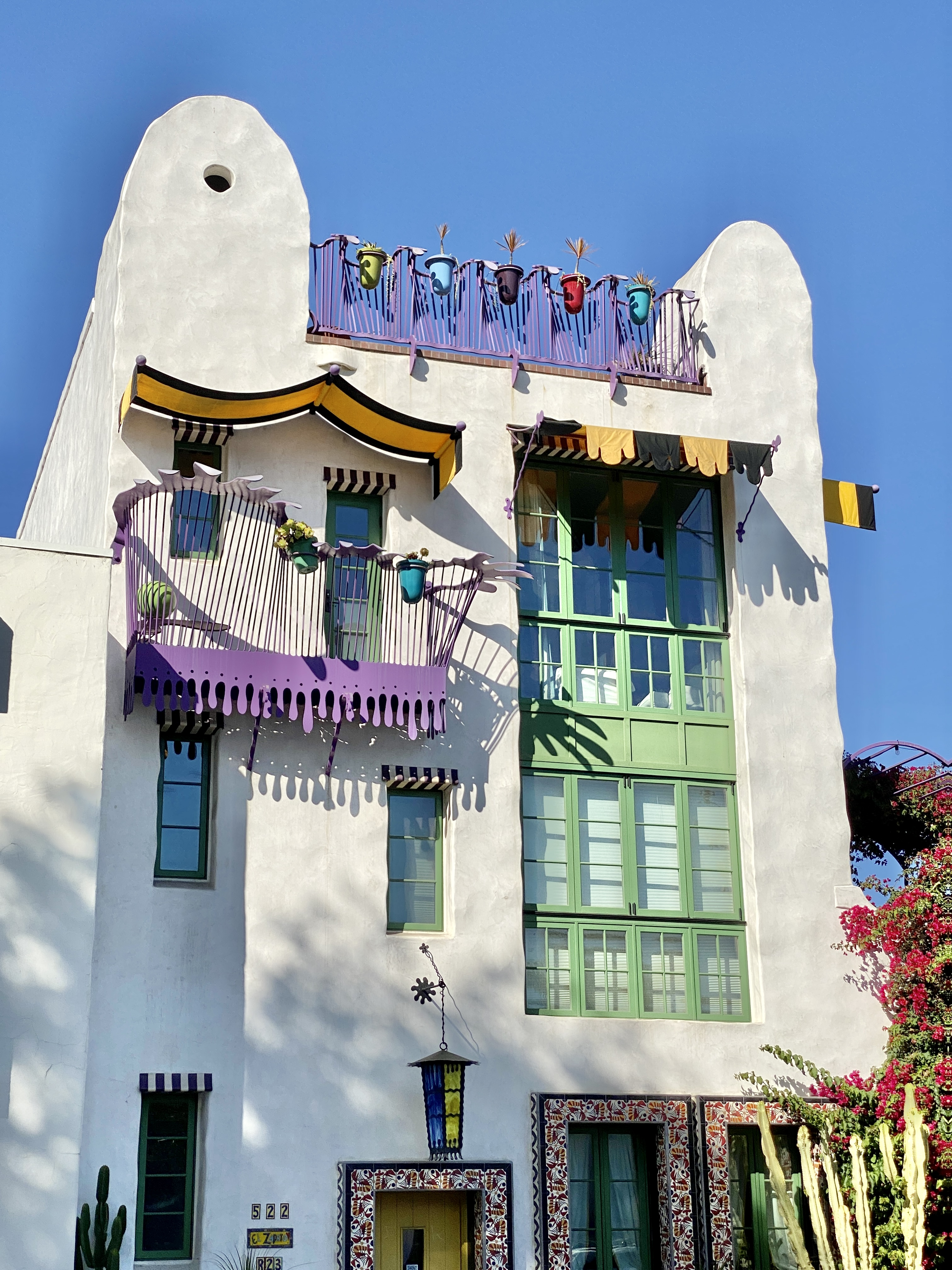
El Zapato, Garden Street, Santa Barbara, CA

== Personal life ==
Jeff, and his wife Karin, raised their two daughters in Santa Barbara, CA. Shelton's brother is film director and screenwriter Ron Shelton.
