= Salt Water Moose =

- Film Poster
- Directed by: Stuart Margolin
- Written by: Bruce McKenna
- Produced by: Peter R. Simpson
- Starring: Timothy Dalton; Lolita Davidovich; Johnny Morina; Katharine Isabelle; Corinne Conley; Maurice Godin
- Cinematography: Vic Sarin
- Edited by: Nick Rotundo
- Music by: Paul Zaza
- Production companies: FUND; The Movie Network; Ontario Film Development Corporation; Showtime Networks; Téléfilm Canada
- Distributed by: Hallmark Home Entertainment; Norstar Releasing
- Release date: June 2, 1996; (USA)
- Running time: 93 mins.
- Country: Canada
- Language: English

Salt Water Moose is a 1996 Canadian family film directed by Stuart Margolin. Filmed in Toronto and in Nova Scotia, it stars Timothy Dalton, Lolita Davidovich, Johnny Morina, and Katharine Isabelle.

== Plot ==
The plot revolves around two kids who decide to help a bull moose stranded on an island by floating a female moose to the island.

== Cast ==
- Johnny Morina as Bobby Scofield
- Katharine Isabelle as Josephine 'Jo' Parnell
- Timothy Dalton as Lester Parnell
- Lolita Davidovich as Eva Scofield
- Corinne Conley as Grandma

== Reception ==
In 1997 Margolin won a Directors Guild of America Award for Outstanding Directing – Children's Programs for his direction of this film.
