= Tom Todoroff =

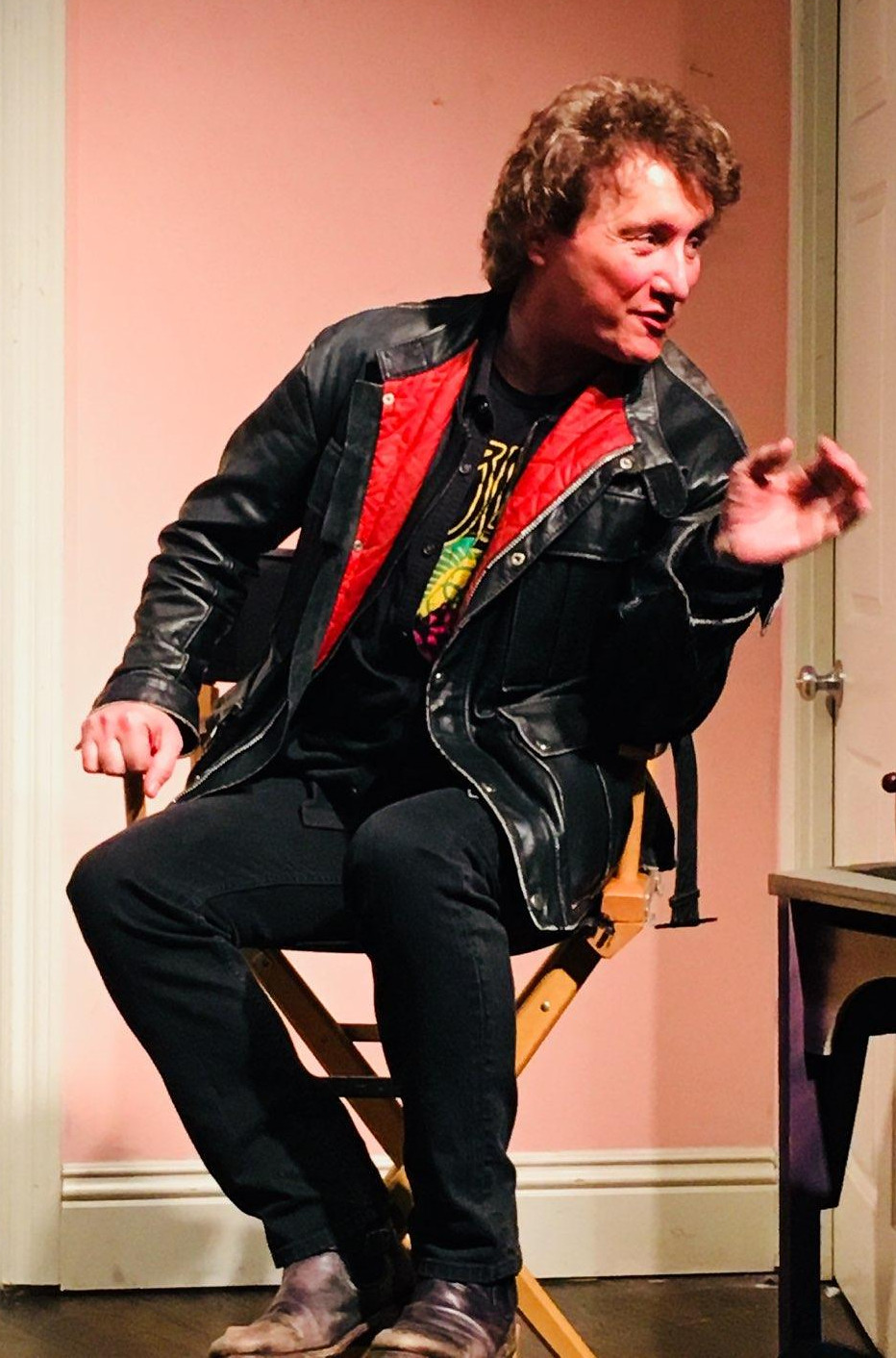
Tom Todoroff directing actors

Tom Todoroff is an American producer, director, writer, actor and voice coach.

== Biography ==
Todoroff is a producer, director, actor and performance coach. He attendedThe Juilliard School (under Alan Schneider) at Lincoln Center. He directed Cicely Berry's The Working Shakespeare Library.

Todoroff is a member of SAG-AFTRA, Actors Equity Association, as well as acting and filmmaking organizations nationwide.

In 1983, he founded the Tom Todoroff Studio in Santa Monica, California and New York City, New York, and working as a voice & speech coach and dialectician.
