= Seth Doliboa =

American basketball player

Personal information
- Born: December 1, 1980 (age 45) Springboro, Ohio
- Listed height: 6 ft 8 in (2.03 m)
- Listed weight: 225 lb (102 kg)

Career information
- High school: Springboro (Springboro, Ohio)
- College: Bowling Green (1999–2000); Wright State (2001–2004)
- NBA draft: 2004: undrafted
- Playing career: 2004–present
- Position: Power forward

Career history
- 2004: Columbus Riverdragons
- 2005–2006: Roanoke Dazzle
- 2006: Anaheim Arsenal
- 2008–2009: Benfica
- 2009–2010: Deutsche Bank Skyliners
- 2010–2011: Olin Edirne Basket
- 2011–2015: Benfica

Seth Doliboa (born 1 December 1980) is an American former basketball player who played for S.L. Benfica in Portugal. After a few years in the National Basketball Development League, he decided to travel to Europe, where he began to achieve more success.

== Honours ==
=== Club ===
Benfica

- Portuguese League (5): 2008–09, 2011–12, 2012–13, 2013–14, 2014–15
- Portuguese Cup: 2013–14, 2014–15
- League Cup: 2012–13, 2013–14, 2014–15
- Portuguese Supercup: 2012, 2013, 2014
- António Pratas Trophy: 2008, 2011, 2012, 2014
- Supertaça Portugal-Angola: 2009–10

=== Individual ===
- Portuguese Basketball League All-Star game MVP, Regular Season MVP: 2008–09
