= Jacob Duran =

American cutman

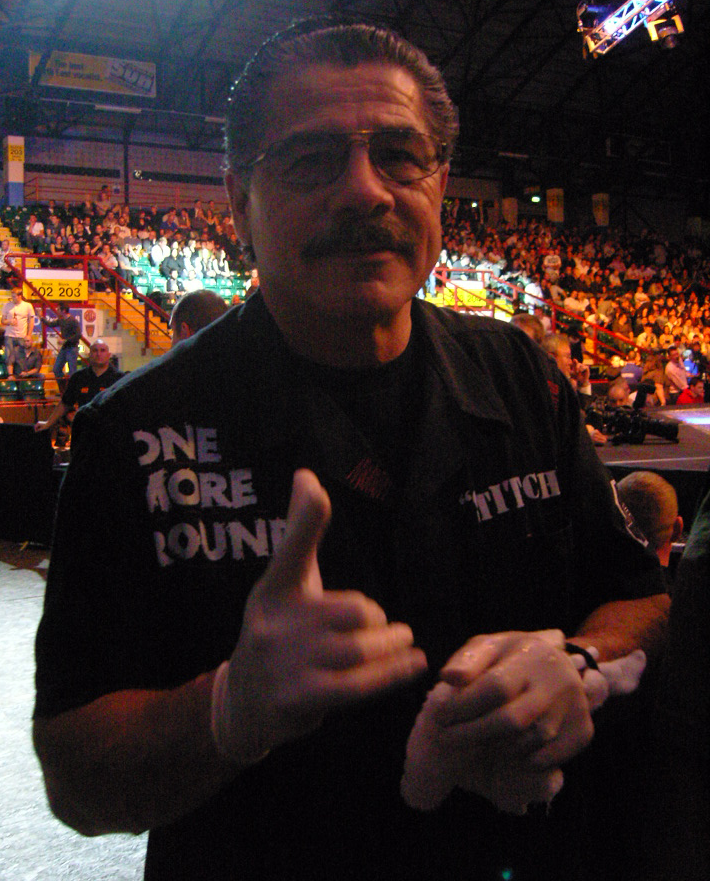
- Duran in 2015
- Born: December 29, 1951 (age 74); Planada, California, U.S.
- Occupation: Cutman

Jacob "Stitch" Duran (born December 29, 1951) is an American professional cutman known for his work in professional boxing and mixed martial arts (MMA). Developing a reputation as one of the most skilled and trusted figures in the industry, Duran is one of the most reputable cutmen in combat sports.

Duran is renowned for his expertise in managing cuts, swelling, and other physical injuries sustained by fighters during bouts. He is of Mexican descent and grew up in Planada, California.

== Career ==
=== Background ===
Duran once owned and ran a boxing and kickboxing school in Fairfield, California. He was also one of the first IKF promoters in California holding his first promotion back in October, 1992. Duran trained and produced several of the first IKF Amateur Champions such as Randy "Buzzman" Bussart, Mike "Mohamid" Duran, John "Psyco" Parker and Andy "The Sandman" Sanchez before furthering his career in professional boxing and mixed martial arts.

=== Boxing ===
On November 23, 2014, Duran was in the corner of Chris Algieri when he took on Manny Pacquiao for the WBO welterweight title at Cotai Arena, Venetian Resort, Macao S.A.R., China.

On May 29, 2015, Duran was once again in the corner of Chris Algieri when he took on Amir Khan for the WBC Silver Welterweight title at The Barclays Center, Brooklyn, New York.

Duran has also appeared as a cutman in the Rocky film series.

He was in Rocky Balboa, where he plays the cutman for Rocky's opponent, Mason "The Line" Dixon (played by real-life boxer Antonio Tarver).

He also appeared in Creed, playing himself in a supporting role. In the film, when Adonis Creed persuades Rocky to train him, Rocky surprises Creed with a corner team that includes Duran. During Creed's fight against "Pretty" Ricky Conlan, Creed is blinded in one eye due to swelling. When the ringside doctor asks how many fingers he's holding up, Duran taps the answer on Creed's neck, allowing the fight to continue.

He reprised his role in its sequels, Creed II and Creed III.

On 15 November 2024, Duran served as cutman for Mike Tyson in Jake Paul vs Mike Tyson, a professional bout that took place at the AT&T Stadium in Arlington, Texas.

Duran has also worked with Vitali & Wladimir Klitschko, Andre Ward, and Tyson Fury.

=== Mixed martial arts ===
In the UFC, Duran was assigned to many of the top fights, working with fighters such as Mirko Filipović, Lyoto Machida, Forrest Griffin and Cain Velasquez.

On July 21, 2015, Duran announced via Twitter that he was let go from his job with the UFC due to comments he made about the organization's Reebok sponsorship deal. Many UFC fighters publicly expressed their disappointment in Duran's firing, citing him as one of the best cutmen in the business.

Duran began working with WSOF on August 1, 2015, starting with World Series of Fighting 22: Palhares vs. Shields.

In March 2016, Duran signed a contract to join Bellator MMA as a cutman.

Duran also made a cameo appearance in Kevin James' sports comedy film, Here Comes the Boom.
