= Cutman =

Person responsible for preventing and treating physical damage to a fighter

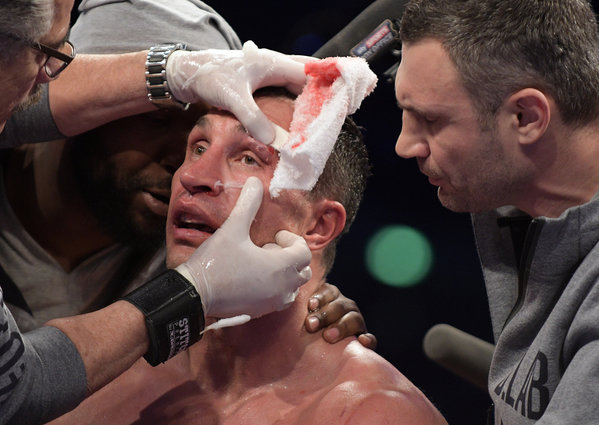
Cutman Jacob "Stitch" Duran administers treatment to fighter Wladimir Klitschko.

A cutman is a person responsible for preventing and treating physical damage to a fighter during the breaks between rounds of a full contact match such as a boxing, kickboxing or a mixed martial arts bout. Cutmen typically handle swelling, nosebleeds and lacerations. In addition to degrading a fighter's performance, the rules of combat sports stipulate that these injuries can be a cause for premature match stoppage, counting as a loss to the injured fighter. The cutman is therefore essential to the fighter, and can be a decisive factor in the outcome of the match.

The compensation for cutmen varies, but is generally 2–3% of the fighter's prize money. For many boxers on a low budget, the cutman duties are performed by their cornerman. While most athletic commissions require cutmen to be licensed, there is usually no formal training or certification required. Most cutmen learn their trade through apprenticeship and self-education.

Unlike boxing, cutmen for mixed martial arts events are generally provided by the promotion, rather than the fighter's corner. This is to prevent allegations of "greasing" (applying petroleum jelly to areas other than the forehead, which provides an unfair advantage in grappling situations).

Cutmen should not be confused with the fight physician, an official who monitors the health of the fighters and whose task is closer to that of a neutral referee. The fight physician provides medical advice, monitors the safety of both fighters in accordance with regulations or law, and evaluates their ability to continue fighting.

== Treatments ==
Before the fight, cutmen will usually put petroleum jelly on the most likely areas of impact, especially the fighter's face, making the skin more elastic and slippery, and hence less likely to tear. It is not considered good practice to use large amounts of petroleum jelly, since during the fight it is likely to end up on the gloves of the opponent, and later in the eyes of the fighter if the opponent lands a punch close to their eyes. Cutmen might also tape fighters' hands, which helps protect the bones and tendons. Wraps are used during training but are illegal during competition, though people still commonly use the term "wrap" to describe the taping method of using gauze and tape.

During the fight, cutmen try to control any swelling or bleeding during the breaks between rounds. Since cutmen are not doctors, and have a very short period of time to treat the fighter, their treatments are limited to advanced first aid treatments.

=== Swelling ===
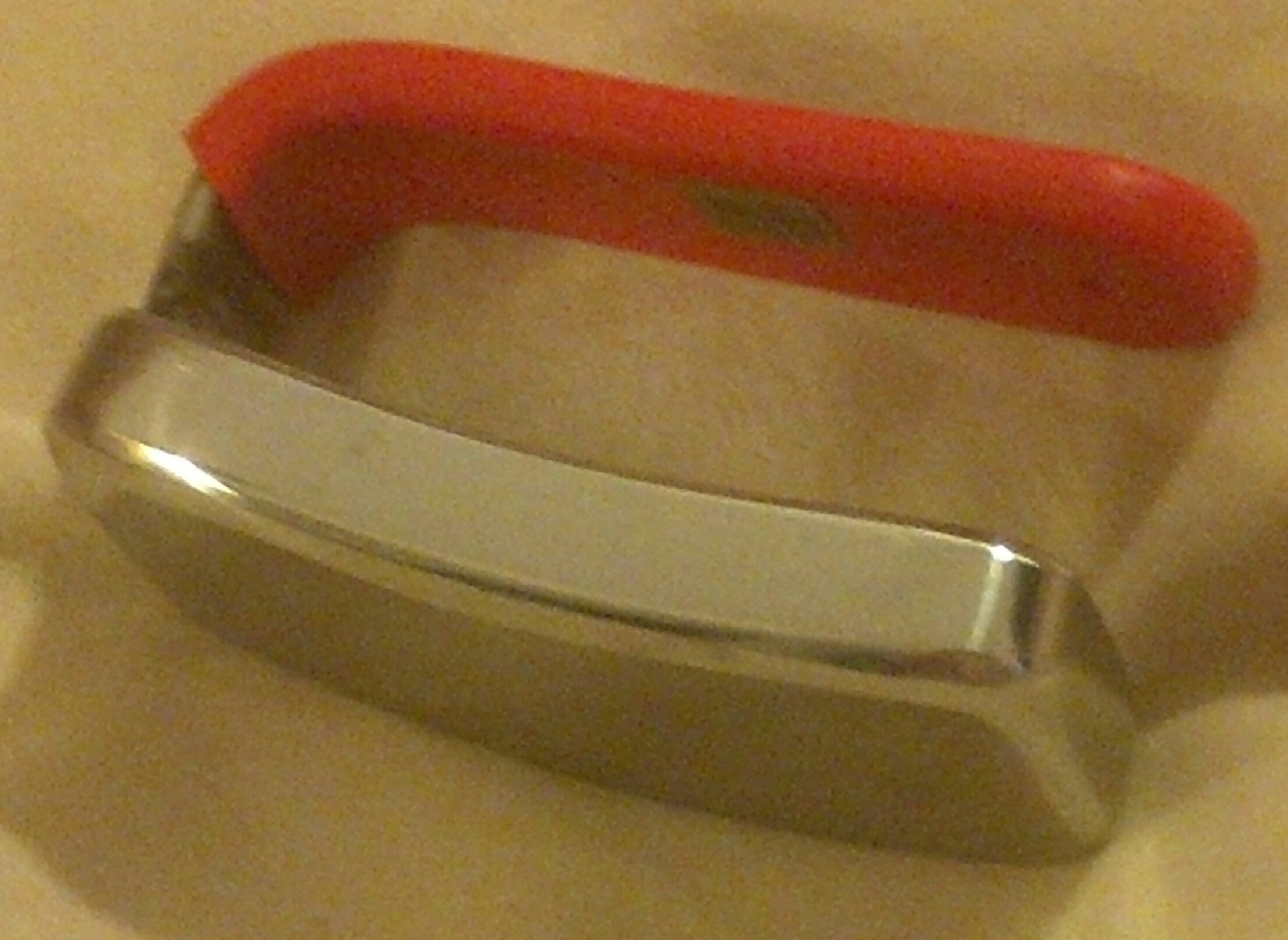
A standard enswell used by cutmen to reduce swelling from facial injuries.

Swelling is usually associated with facial hematomas (bruises — localized bleeding outside of blood vessels), and is traditionally reduced by applying firm pressure with a chilled enswell or an ice bag on top of the area of trauma. The cutman presses the enswell against a fighter's skin to cool and reduce swelling from injuries, especially in areas around the eyes where swelling can impair vision. Since the time between rounds is very short, cutmen try to apply the enswell right away and hold it as long as they can, but a common mistake is using the enswell to push directly on the swollen area in an attempt to disperse it or move it into a safer place such as away from the eye. Such treatment will not move the hematoma, and may disrupt the microscopic blood vessels under the skin, thus causing an increase in bleeding and enlargement of the swelled area.

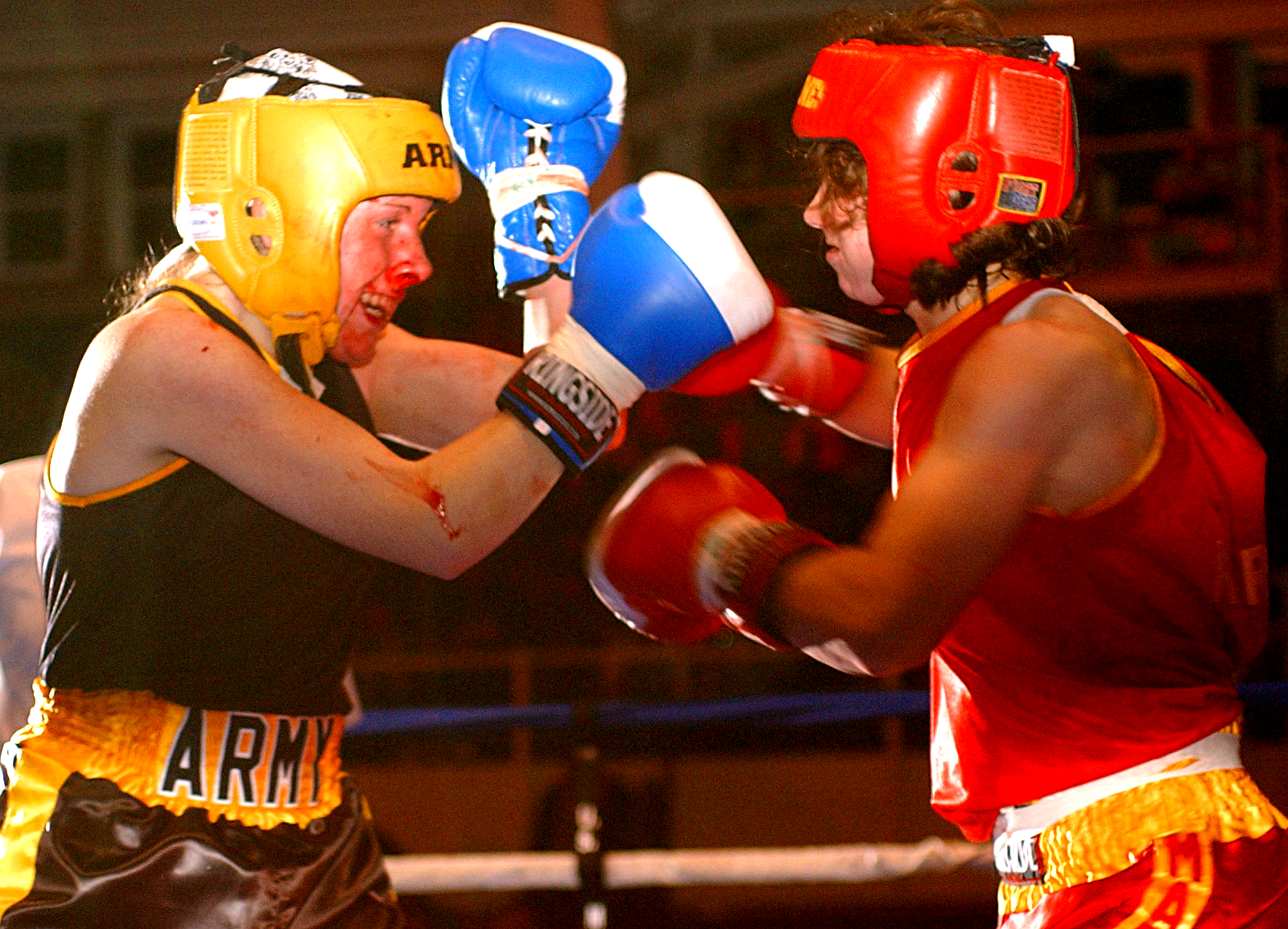
PFC Raelina Shinn (left) battles on with a nosebleed during the first female fight in the Armed Forces Boxing Championships.

=== Cuts ===
Cuts (lacerations) are the primary focus of the cutman because unless the bleeding is stopped promptly, the fight physician may stop the fight and declare that the injured fighter has lost the match. Physicians also will stop a match for a laceration that is perpendicular to the eye. The most common area of the face to be cut is around the eye. Cuts are treated by applying a cold towel to clean and simultaneously cool the area of the cut, causing a decrease in blood flow. A cotton swab soaked in epinephrine is applied with pressure to decrease blood flow even more. A collagen-based hemostat for clot formation (such as Avitene) is put into the cut to coagulate the blood. A cutman might also cover the area with petroleum jelly to prevent further damage.

=== Nosebleeds ===
Most nosebleeds occur near the opening of the nose. To stop the bleeding, cutmen generally apply a cotton swab soaked in epinephrine to the damaged area, while simultaneously pressing the nostril against the cotton swab with the other hand. Once the bleeding has stopped, the area is chilled with an ice pack or an enswell. The fighter is usually instructed to breathe through the mouth during the treatment.

A broken nose is a more difficult case, and can be detected by a heavy flow of dark colored blood from the nose. The bleeding is generally treated the same way; however, the fighter is usually instructed to avoid swallowing blood as it may induce nausea or vomiting, and the cutman is more likely to consult the ringside physician to ensure the fighter's safety.

== Tools ==
=== Equipment ===
- Enswell, sometimes called end-swell, endswell, stop-swell, no-swell or eye iron, is a small piece of metal with a handle. It is traditionally kept on ice and is used to cool the area of a bruise or a cut by applying direct pressure to decrease the blood flow to the area.
- Cotton swabs are used to apply medications to the fighter's wounds. While some cutmen use ready-made cotton swabs, others make their own. It has been suggested that the practice of past cutmen's in keeping cotton swabs behind their ears or in their mouths is unsanitary and unprofessional.
- Ice packs are used to cool bruises, cuts and sprains, and to keep the enswell cold.
- Petroleum jelly is put on the cuts and most likely areas of impact to make the skin more elastic and slippery, and hence less likely to tear. Some cutmen cover cuts with homemade salve containing a mix of petroleum jelly and adrenaline chloride, so that adrenaline keeps getting applied to the wound during the bout. Also, perspiration from above the eyes will be prevented from reaching the eyes by applying petroleum jelly to the eyebrows.
- Gauze pads are used to dry cuts.
- Medical gloves are worn by the cutman to limit the fighter's exposure to infectious matter, as well as limiting the cutman's exposure to blood.

=== Medications ===
Cutmen used to create their own medications, and the recipes were passed from masters to apprentices as trade secrets. Today, the use of various medications in sports is highly controlled, and most cutmen use only two or three standard medications from the list below.

- Epinephrine (also adrenaline chloride, usually a 1:1000 solution): Applied topically to decrease blood flow. This is arguably the most common medication used by cutmen.
- Microfibrillar collagen hemostat (brand name Avitene): Coagulant used for bleeding cuts. Usually used in a powder form. It works best when the surface is dry. The treatment includes covering the affected area with Avitene, and applying moderate pressure with dry gauze.
- Thrombin: Coagulant used when the blood is removed and the surface is dry.
- Oxidized regenerated cellulose (brand name Surgicel) and absorbable gelatin sponge powder (brand name Gelfoam): Two other substances also used for coagulation, although less frequently than Avitene or thrombin.
- Ferric subsulfate solution (also known as Monsel's solution): This widely outlawed hemostatic quickly stops the blood flow by chemically cauterizing the tissues surrounding the cut, while generating severe scar tissue. Contrary to popular misconception, this hemostatic solution does not contain lead.

== Notable cutmen ==
- Vasil "Chuck" Bodak, an American cutman who has worked with over 50 world champions including Muhammad Ali, Rocky Marciano, Tommy Hearns, Julio César Chávez, Evander Holyfield, and Oscar De La Hoya.
- Rafael Garcia, a Mexican cutman known for working with boxing legend Floyd Mayweather Jr. Garcia has also worked with numerous iconic fighters such as Roberto Duran, Jessie Vargas, Alexis Arguello, and Wilfredo Gomez.
- "Uncle Al" Gavin, an American cutman from Brooklyn who worked with fighters such as Lennox Lewis, Mickey Ward, Junior Jones, Kevin Kelley, Eric Harding, and Oscar De La Hoya.
- Jacob "Stitch" Duran, an American boxing and MMA cutman who worked for UFC and was assigned to many top fights. In 2016, Duran signed a contract to join Bellator MMA as a cutman. He also appeared in the Rocky film franchise as a cutman.
- Mike Rodriguez, dubbed "The Crime-fighting Cutman" due to his military background and career in law enforcement, is an American cutman most known for working with eight-division world champion Manny Pacquiao. He has also worked with fighters such as Dmitry Bivol, Errol Spence Jr., and Shawn Porter.
