= José Vilhena =

Portuguese basketball player

Free Agent
- Position: Small forward / shooting guard

Personal information
- Born: 16 April 1989 (age 37) Barreiro, Portugal
- Listed height: 6 ft 5 in (1.96 m)

Career information
- Playing career: 2007–present

Career history
- 2007–2012: Barreirense
- 2012–2015: Vitória Guimarães
- 2015–2017: Porto
- 2017–2026: Benfica

Career highlights
- Portuguese League champion (2022)

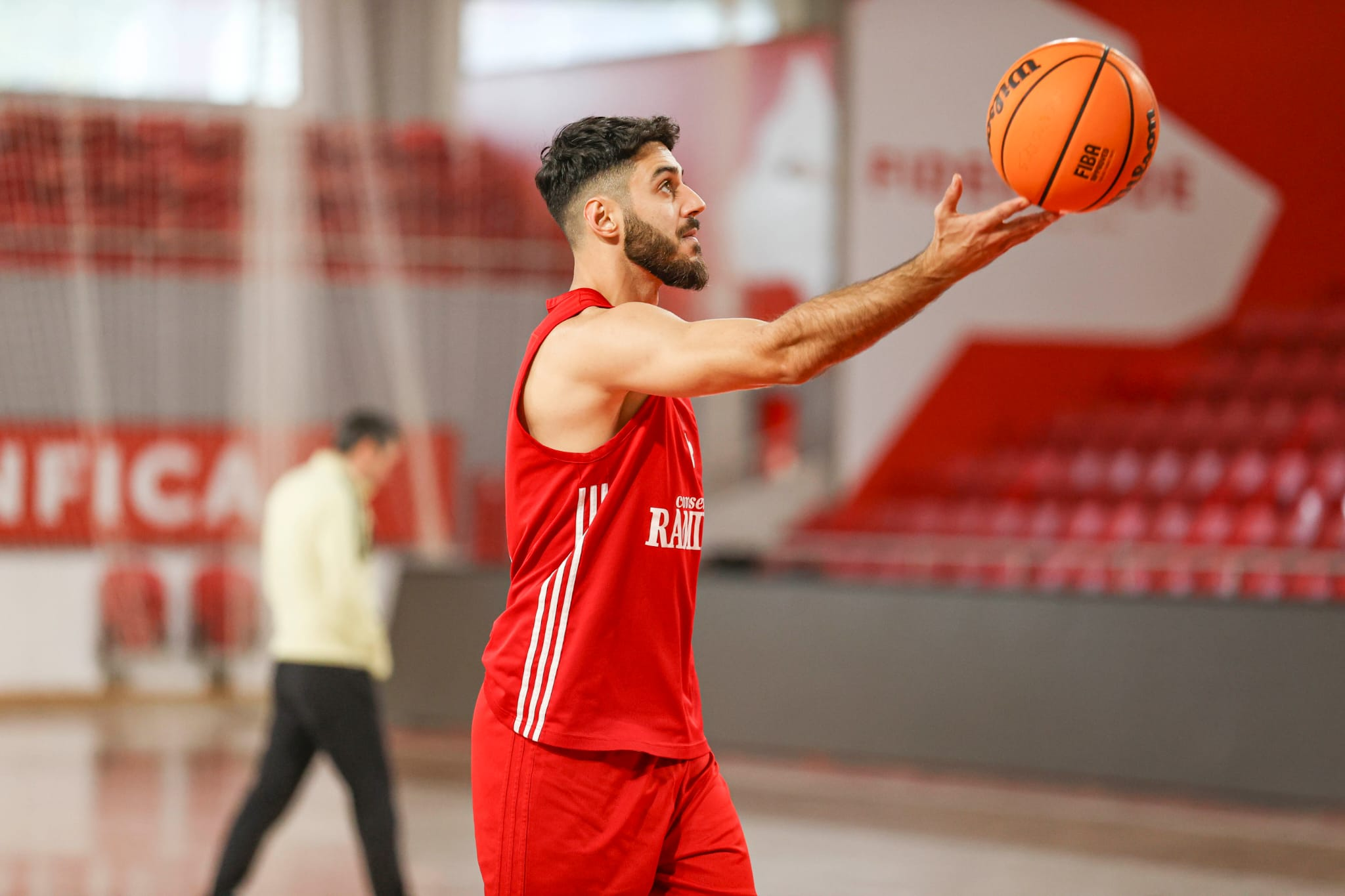
José Silva during practice

José Carlos Vilhena da Silva (born 16 April 1989), also known as José Silva, is a Portuguese professional basketball player who last played for Benfica of the Liga Portuguesa de Basquetebol.

He has been a member of the Portugal national team and participated at the 2015 EuroBasket qualification, where he hit most three point shots for his team.
