= Matt Nover =

American basketball player (born 1970)

Personal information
- Born: September 23, 1970 (age 56) Chesterton, Indiana, U.S.
- Listed height: 6 ft 8 in (2.03 m)
- Listed weight: 223 lb (101 kg)

Career information
- High school: Chesterton (Chesterton, Indiana)
- College: Indiana (1989–1993)
- Playing career: 1993–2009
- Position: Forward

Career history

Playing
- 1993–1994: Carife Ferrara
- 1995–1996: Bellinzona
- 1996: Illiabum
- 1998: San Germán
- 1998: Sydney Kings
- 1998–2000: Nippon Denso
- 2000–2001: Benfica Lisboa
- 2001–2003: Aveiro Basket
- 2003: C.A. Queluz
- 2003–2004: CB Murcia
- 2004: Ovarense
- 2007–2009: A.D. Vagos

Coaching
- 2008–2010: S.C. Beira-Mar

Career highlights
- As player: LEB Oro champion (2003); Portuguese All-Star (2002)

Matthew Joseph Nover (born September 23, 1970) is an American former professional basketball player. He played college basketball for Indiana University and later professionally, including for C.B. Polaris World Murcia in the Liga ACB and for Sydney Kings in the Australian NBL. In 1994, he appeared in Blue Chips along with Nick Nolte, Penny Hardaway, and Shaquille O'Neal.

Nover played high school basketball for Chesterton High School.

== Portuguese national basketball team ==
Nover, who is a naturalized citizen of Portugal, played for the Portuguese national basketball team during the 2003 and 2005 FIBA EuroBasket qualification.
