= Independence Day (Ford novel) =

1995 novel by Richard Ford

- First edition cover
- Author: Richard Ford
- Language: English
- Genre: Novel
- Publisher: Alfred A. Knopf
- Publication date: June 13, 1995
- Publication place: United States
- Media type: Print (hardback & paperback)
- Pages: 464 pp
- ISBN: 0-679-49265-8
- OCLC: 31901250
- Dewey Decimal: 813/.54 20
- LC Class: PS3556.O713 I53 1995
- Preceded by: Wildlife
- Followed by: Women with Men: Three Stories

Independence Day is a 1995 novel by American writer Richard Ford and the sequel to Ford's 1986 novel The Sportswriter. This novel is the second in what is now a five-part series, the first being The Sportswriter. It was followed by The Lay of the Land (2006), Let Me Be Frank With You (2014), and Be Mine (2023). Independence Day won the Pulitzer Prize and PEN/Faulkner Award for Fiction in 1996, becoming the first novel ever to win both awards in a single year.

== Plot summary ==
The novel follows Frank Bascombe, a New Jersey real estate agent (and ex-sportswriter), through the titular holiday weekend as he visits his ex-wife, his troubled son, his current lover, the tenants of one of his properties and some clients of his who have been having trouble finding the perfect house. It focuses in particular on a car trip with his son to the Basketball and Baseball Halls of Fame. Similar in form and common themes to John Updike's Rabbit novels, Independence Day is a pastoral meditation on a man reaching middle age and assessing his place in life and the greater world.

== Critical reception ==
Independence Day won the Pulitzer Prize and PEN/Faulkner Award for Fiction in 1996, becoming the first novel ever to win both awards in a single year.

The book was well-reviewed, with Michiko Kakutani writing in The New York Times that "Mr. Ford has galvanized his reputation as one of his generation's most eloquent voices." Barbara Ehrenreich of The New Republic wrote "for dead-on dialogue and a perfect rendering of small-town and suburban distractedness, writing doesn’t get much better than this."

Conversely, a 1995 book review by Kirkus Reviews summarized the book as "humorless and full of sham insight ("We're all free agents"), although fans of the first installment won't be disappointed." The review also found the central character, Bascombe, to be "part angry white male and part new sensitive guy but mostly just a smug fool, who lingers over every detail of his life with Harold Brodkey-style obsession."
