= Wildlife (novel) =

1990 novel by American author Richard Ford

- Cover (1st Ed.), Atlantic Monthly Press, 1990
- Author: Richard Ford
- Language: English
- Genre: Novel
- Publisher: Atlantic Monthly Press
- Publication date: January 01, 1990
- Publication place: United States
- Media type: Print (Hardcover)
- Pages: 177 p.
- ISBN: 9780871133489
- OCLC: 490863611
- Preceded by: Rock Springs
- Followed by: Independence Day

Wildlife is the fourth novel by American author Richard Ford. It was first published in 1990.

The story is set in Great Falls, Montana in 1960. It is narrated by 16-year-old Joe Brinson, as he observes his parents' marriage dissolve right in front of his eyes, and as his mother begins an affair.

Since the action and plot are set in Montana, it’s been called one of Ford’s “Montana books,” along with his story collection Rock Springs, and his novel Canada.

== Reception ==
Upon its release in 1990, the novel received mixed —though generally laudatory— reviews. Publishers Weekly was impressed with “Ford's remarkable ability to capture distinctive voices […] and again proves Ford to be a gifted chronicler of the down-and-out.” Meanwhile, The New York Times reviewer —Christopher Lehmann-Haupt —expressed concerns that sometimes Ford’s style devolves into "sententious baby talk."

Kirkus Reviews observed that as the narrator relates his hard won wisdom to the reader, it can sound like “K-Mart pearls […] the kind that country-and-western songs are strung with, and here especially they appear to be the only things Ford's high lonesome sound is after.”

Joseph Coates, writing in the Chicago Tribune, found Wildlife to be “a beautifully modulated full-length novel” and believed that Ford “accomplishes the most thoroughly worked-out expression of human feeling I’ve read since James Agee's A Death in the Family, which also was about a boy’s loss of parenthood…”

== Film adaptation ==
The novel was adapted into a film of the same name in 2018, with Paul Dano making his directorial debut from a script he co-wrote with Zoe Kazan.
