= Bad Education (2019 film) =

2019 film directed by Cory Finley

- Official promotional poster
- Directed by: Cory Finley
- Screenplay by: Mike Makowsky
- Based on: "The Bad Superintendent" by Robert Kolker
- Produced by: Fred Berger; Brian Kavanaugh-Jones; Julia Lebedev; Mike Makowsky; Oren Moverman; Eddie Vaisman
- Starring: Hugh Jackman; Allison Janney; Geraldine Viswanathan; Alex Wolff; Rafael Casal; Stephen Spinella; Annaleigh Ashford; Ray Romano
- Cinematography: Lyle Vincent
- Edited by: Louise Ford
- Music by: Michael Abels
- Production companies: Automatik; Sight Unseen; Slater Hall
- Distributed by: HBO Films (through Warner Bros. Television Distribution)
- Release dates: September 8, 2019 (TIFF); April 25, 2020 (United States)
- Running time: 108 minutes
- Country: United States
- Language: English

Bad Education is a 2019 American crime drama film directed by Cory Finley and written by Mike Makowsky. It is based on the 2004 New York magazine article "The Bad Superintendent" by Robert Kolker, about the true story of the largest public school embezzlement in American history. It features an ensemble cast including Hugh Jackman, Allison Janney, Geraldine Viswanathan, Alex Wolff, Rafael Casal, Stephen Spinella, Annaleigh Ashford and Ray Romano.

Set in the Long Island village of Roslyn in the early 2000s, the film tells the story of school district superintendent Dr. Frank Tassone (Jackman) who, along with assistant superintendent Pam Gluckin (Janney) stole millions of dollars from their wealthy public school district, and together attempted to cover up the embezzlement. The screenwriter, Makowsky, briefly met Tassone as a child before the scandal broke and attended Roslyn High School in the late 2000s.

Bad Education made its world premiere on September 8, 2019, at the Toronto International Film Festival and was broadcast on HBO on April 25, 2020. It was well received by film critics, with particular praise for Makowsky's screenplay, Finley's direction, and Jackman's and Janney's performances. At the 72nd Primetime Emmy Awards, the film won for Outstanding Television Movie and Jackman received a nomination for Primetime Emmy Award for Outstanding Lead Actor in a Limited or Anthology Series or Movie.

== Plot ==
In 2002, Dr. Frank Tassone is superintendent of the Roslyn Union Free School District on Long Island. He and assistant superintendent Pam Gluckin have overseen major improvements in the district, with Roslyn High School becoming the fourth-ranked public school in the country. The school's performance stimulates the local economy, reaping rewards for school board president and real estate broker Bob Spicer. Beloved by students and parents, Frank claims to have lost his wife several years ago, and rejects advances from some of the local mothers. Attending a conference in Las Vegas, he begins an affair with his former student Kyle Contreras whom he meets at a bar.

Student reporter Rachel Bhargava is writing an article for the Roslyn High School paper about a skywalk the school plans to construct, and Frank blithely encourages her to treat her article as any top journalist would. She investigates the project, to Pam's irritation, and notices irregularities in the district's finances. It is revealed that Pam has a fraudulent district expense card, which she encourages her niece Jenny, a district clerk, to use. When Pam's son uses the card to shop for thousands of dollars' worth of construction materials for her home renovation, Bob is alerted by a relative working at the store.

Bob and the school board confront Pam, realizing she has embezzled at least $250,000 in taxpayer funds. Frank persuades them to handle the matter quietly, detailing the consequences a public scandal would have on the school and community. They agree to conceal the embezzlement, forcing Pam to pay restitution and resign; the board announces her abrupt "retirement." Convincing district auditor Phil Metzger to falsify the financial records, Frank appoints him as Pam's temporary replacement. He transfers Jenny to a less visible "special utilities" role, threatening to expose her own misuse of funds when she implies blackmailing him.

Rachel continues her investigation, uncovering evidence of the embezzlement in supply orders that were never fulfilled and massive consulting fees paid to unknown companies, including Pam's husband's car dealership. She finds a cumulative expense of $803,000 to Wordpower Tech and visits the address, which she discovers is a Manhattan apartment. A man answers the door and Rachel leaves, but she and Frank spot each other when he arrives and enters the same apartment. The man is Tom Tuggiero, Frank's domestic partner, and Rachel realizes Wordpower Tech is a front created by Frank, a co-conspirator in the embezzlement. Frank later warns Rachel of the potential fallout for exposing the story.

Phil informs Frank of an incriminating expense: Frank used district funds on first-class tickets to fly himself and Kyle by Concorde to London. Frank threatens to place blame squarely on Phil for failing to catch Pam's scheme and taking part in the cover-up. Phil agrees to keep quiet, but Rachel publishes her story in the school paper, exposing Frank's key role in the embezzlement. Insisting he acted in the school's best interest, Frank pleads with Bob not to confirm the scandal until the school budget is approved, but Bob and the school board report the cover-up in its entirety.

Pam, Jenny, and Phil are arrested; when the authorities threaten to prosecute her family, Pam agrees to testify against Frank and turns over evidence of the scheme. Tom is informed of Frank's second life with Kyle, and Rachel becomes the school paper's editor-in-chief. Frank resigns, flees to Nevada with tens of thousands of dollars in cash, and moves in with Kyle in a house he bought for him. He is eventually arrested, returned to New York, and convicted. In prison, Frank fantasizes about being back at Roslyn, where he is congratulated for making the school #1 in the country.

An epilogue reveals that Frank was convicted of embezzling $2.2 million and sentenced to 4 to 12 years in prison. Pam, who pled guilty to embezzling $4.3 million and testified against Frank, was sentenced to 3 to 9 years in prison. A total of $11 million was embezzled, the largest school theft in American history. Due to an oversight in state pension regulations, Frank is still slated to receive his teacher's pension of $173,495.04 per year.

== Cast ==
- Hugh Jackman as Frank Tassone
- Allison Janney as Pam Gluckin
- Geraldine Viswanathan as Rachel Bhargava
- Alex Wolff as Nick Fleischman
- Rafael Casal as Kyle Contreras
- Stephen Spinella as Tom Tuggiero
- Annaleigh Ashford as Jenny Aquila
- Ray Romano as Big Bob Spicer
- Hari Dhillon as David Bhargava
- Jeremy Shamos as Phil Metzger
- Stephanie Kurtzuba as Carol Schweitzer
- Catherine Curtin as Judy Shapiro
- Kathrine Narducci as Sharon Katz
- Ray Abruzzo as Howard Gluckin
- Kayli Carter as Amber McCarden
- Jimmy Tatro as Jim Boy McCarden
- Pat Healy as District Attorney
- Larry Romano as Cousin Larry

== Production ==
The screenplay was written by Mike Makowsky, who in 2004 was a middle school student in the Roslyn Union Free School District when its superintendent, Frank Tassone, was arrested for first-degree larceny. Makowsky bought the rights to Robert Kolker's New York article on the subject and returned to his childhood hometown to compile research for the project. He expected to write a film portraying Tassone as a straightforward villain. However, interviews with his former teachers and neighbors revealed a much more nuanced portrait of Tassone that informed the eventual screenplay. A decision was made not to involve any of the perpetrators in the development of the film, out of respect for the town of Roslyn.

Makowsky, Fred Berger, Brian Kavanaugh-Jones, Julia Lebedev, Edward Vaisman and Oren Moverman produced the film under their Automatik and Sight Unseen banners. In March 2018, Hugh Jackman entered talks to star in the film. Cory Finley (whose previous film was the Sundance darling Thoroughbreds) was announced as director at the same time.

Jackman worked with his dialect coach, Jess Platt, to perfect his accent as Tassone. Jackman noted that, "I haven't done a film without him—except for Australia, of course—for 20 years. I'm someone who can get to 80 percent of an accent sort of easily, but it's that final 20 percent that really makes a difference. He was on set with me yelling and screaming, and he's originally from Brooklyn, so he's around the area and knows it well."

In June 2018, Allison Janney joined the cast of the film, with Geraldine Viswanathan and Ray Romano signing on the following month. More than a dozen supporting cast members were hired in October 2018, including Alex Wolff, Rafael Casal, Stephen Spinella, and Annaleigh Ashford. Principal photography began in October 2018.

== Historical accuracy ==
Rebekah Rombom was described by The New York Times in 2004 as doing "what few high school journalists ever do: she broke some real news. Her article about the embezzlement scandal in the Roslyn School District was a major scoop." The Times gave a byline to Rombom to describe the events at Roslyn High over the prior several months, and in a June 27, 2004 Times article, Tassone had only recently resigned but had not yet been charged. Rombom writes, "School officials say that are [sic] looking into payments of several hundred thousand dollars paid to a company that lists Dr. Tassone's Manhattan apartment as its address."

Her film counterpart, Rachel Bhargava, "does a little more investigative reporting than I did" according to Rombom.

The film's description of Frank Tassone living with one man in Manhattan while secretly owning another house in Las Vegas with a 32-year-old male exotic dancer appears to be accurate except possibly for one detail: in portraying the dancer as a former student. Tassone claims: "I have never, ever, in my 36-year career in education, had a relationship with a student or with someone who had graduated."

== Themes ==
Jackman felt one of the film's main themes was the difference between the image one projects and the truth. He noted, "For Frank, how he was perceived and judged by people on-site was very important, and he justified that as being a part of his job, how he needed to project being upstanding to represent the school district in order for it to get to No. 1. [...] And by the way, it's a battle that most of us face in our everyday life. It starts off as a teenager when you're trying to get a boyfriend or girlfriend or someone to like you, and you're like, OK, I'm not going to try that part, what's going to work for me?"

== Release ==
Bad Education had its world premiere at the Toronto International Film Festival on September 8, 2019. Shortly after, HBO Films acquired distribution rights for $17.5 million in the largest deal of the festival. It was released April 25, 2020, on the HBO premium cable network and HBO's streaming services. The film was also available at the launch of HBO Max.

== Reception ==
=== Critical response ===
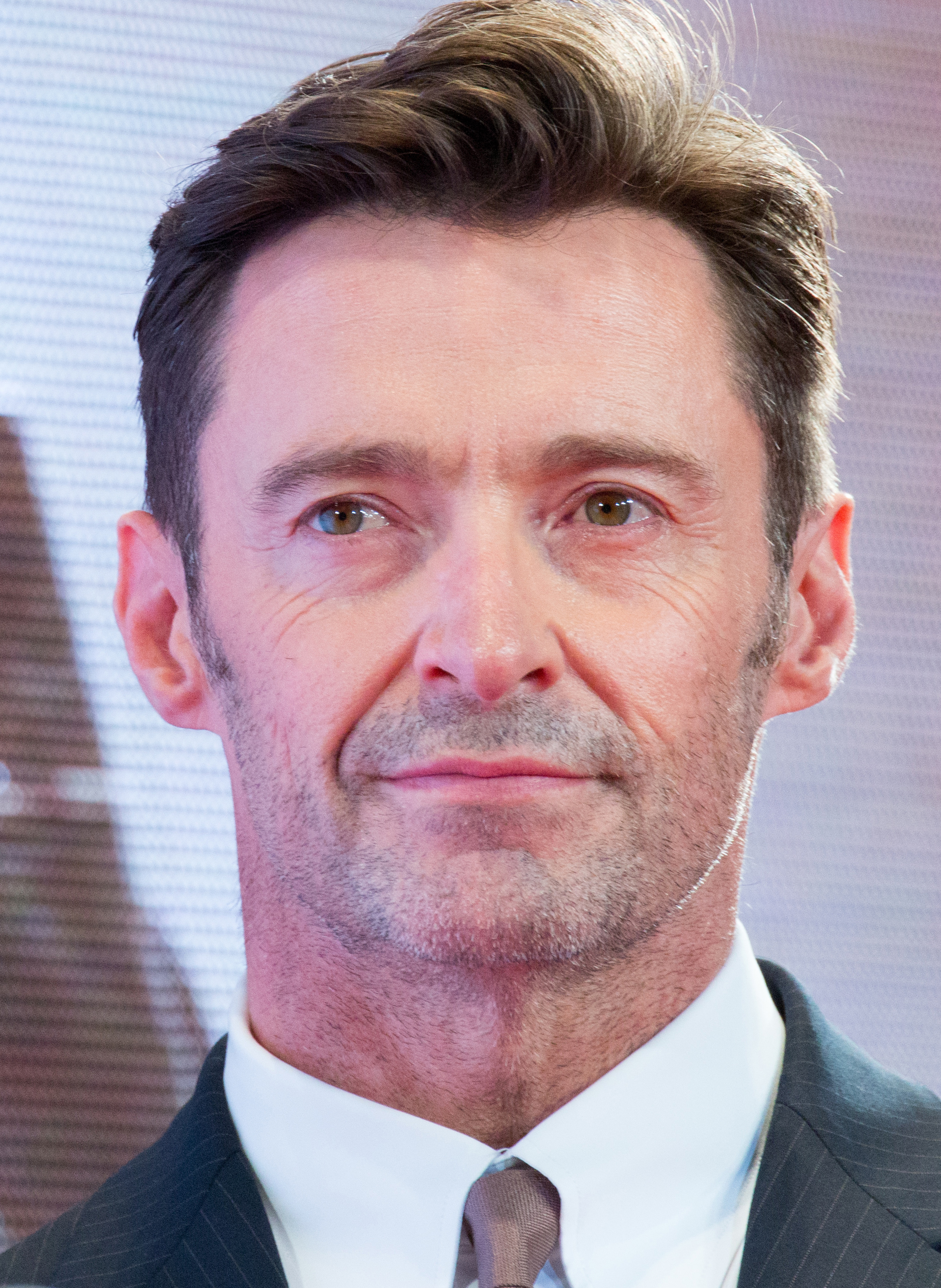
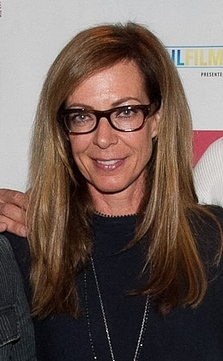
Hugh Jackman and Allison Janney's performances garnered widespread critical acclaim.

On Rotten Tomatoes the film holds an approval rating of 94% based on 156 reviews, with an average rating of 7.7/10. The site's critical consensus reads: "Anchored by an outstanding Hugh Jackman, Bad Education finds absurd laughs—and a worthy message—in the aftermath of a real-life scandal." On Metacritic, the film has a weighted average score of 79 out of 100, based on 29 critics, indicating "generally favorable" reviews.

Peter Travers of Rolling Stone described Jackman's work as "a career-best performance from a movie star with a genuine actor's depth and range" and the script as "devilishly clever and detailed". Ben Kenigsberg of The New York Times chose the film as the publication's critic's pick and praised Finley's composition, Makowsky's dialogue, the set decoration, Abels' "jarring, percussive score", and Jackman's "darkly charismatic" performance.

David Ehrlich of IndieWire commended Makowsky's script as a "well-calculated masterclass in narrative economy". Jake Coyle of the Associated Press compared the film's tone and story favorably to Alexander Payne's 1999 film Election. Coyle also singled out Janney's performance as sliding "into the movie so perfectly that it feels more like she came first and the film was sensibly built around her".

Frank Tassone spoke admiringly about Jackman and Janney's performances. He noted that Jackman "did a very good job playing me. Especially at the end, when I walk out of prison and I see what I lost. That really hit home for me. Because I did lose all of that."

=== TV ratings ===
On its first televised airing, Bad Education scored a 0.18 rating in the 18–49 demographic.

=== Accolades ===
Year	Award	Category	Nominee(s)	Result	Ref.
2020	Hollywood Critics Association Midseason Awards	Best Picture	Bad Education	Nominated	
2020	Hollywood Critics Association Midseason Awards	Best Actor	Hugh Jackman	Nominated	
2020	Hollywood Critics Association Midseason Awards	Best Supporting Actress	Allison Janney	Won	
2020	Hollywood Critics Association Midseason Awards	Best Male Director	Cory Finley	Nominated	
2020	Hollywood Critics Association Midseason Awards	Best Adapted Screenplay	Mike Makowsky	Won	
2020	Primetime Emmy Awards	Outstanding Lead Actor in a Limited Series or Movie	Hugh Jackman	Nominated	
2020	Primetime Creative Arts Emmy Awards	Outstanding Television Movie	Fred Berger, Caroline Jaczko, Brian Kavanaugh-Jones, Julia Lebedev, Leonid Lebedev, Mike Makowsky, Oren Moverman, and Eddie Vaisman	Won	
2021	Artios Awards	Film – Non-Theatrical Release	Ellen Lewis and Kate Sprance	Won	
2021	Critics' Choice Television Awards	Best Television Movie	Bad Education	Nominated	
2021	GLAAD Media Awards	Outstanding TV Movie	Bad Education	Nominated	
2021	Golden Reel Awards	Outstanding Achievement in Sound Editing – Sound Effects, Foley, Music, Dialogue and ADR for Non-Theatrical Feature Film Broadcast Media	Gene Park, Ric Schnupp, Craig Kyllonen, Colin Alexander, and Shari Johanson	Nominated	
2021	Gotham Independent Film Awards	Best Screenplay	Mike Makowsky	Nominated	
2021	Hollywood Music in Media Awards	Best Original Score in a TV Movie/Streamed	Michael Abels	Nominated	
2021	Independent Spirit Awards	Best Screenplay	Mike Makowsky	Nominated	
2021	Producers Guild of America Awards	Outstanding Producer of Streamed or Televised Motion Pictures	Fred Berger and Eddie Vaisman	Nominated	
2021	Satellite Awards	Best Television Film	Bad Education	Nominated	
2021	Satellite Awards	Best Actor in a Miniseries or TV Film	Hugh Jackman	Nominated	
2021	Writers Guild of America Awards	Long Form – Adapted	Mike Makowsky; Based on the New York Magazine article "The Bad Superintendent" by Robert Kolker	Nominated	

== See also ==
- 2019 college admissions bribery scandal
