= Nothing to Declare =

Nothing to Declare may refer to:

- Border Security: Australia's Front Line, also known as Nothing to Declare, Australian television program that airs on the Seven Network
- Nothing to Declare (Paul Bley album), 2003
- Nothing to Declare (700 Bliss album), 2022
- Nothing to Declare (film), a 2010 French comedy film
- "Nothing to Declare" (Between the Lines), a 1992 television episode
- Nothing to Declare UK, a British version of Border Security: Australia's Front Line which aired in 2011 by Sky 1
- "Nothing to Declare", a song by MGMT, from the 2024 album Loss of Life
- Nothing to Declare (short story), a 2020 short story by Richard Ford
