= June Pictures =

Entertainment Production Company

- Company type: Private
- Industry: Entertainment
- Founded: 2016
- Founder: Alex Saks; Andrew Duncan
- Defunct: 2018
- Successor: Snow Day
- Headquarters: United States
- Services: Film production
- Number of employees: 10

June Pictures was an American independent entertainment production company founded by Alex Saks and Andrew Duncan, and based in Los Angeles, California. It specialized in film production, and film finance.

The company has produced films such as Thoroughbreds, Dude, Wildlife, and Book Club. In 2017, their production The Florida Project received a Best Supporting Actor nomination.

== History ==
In February 2016, it was announced Alex Saks and Andrew Duncan would launch the company, focusing on producing and financing feature films and documentaries, with Dude, being the first film produced by the company. The company will finance films ranging from $5–10 million. The company has produced films such as Thoroughbreds directed by Cory Finley, Fun Mom Dinner, by Alethea Jones, Wildlife, by Paul Dano, Book Club by Bill Holderman, and The Florida Project by Sean Baker.

In December 2017, Duncan was accused of sexual misconduct by over a dozen people. Following the allegations, Duncan stepped down from the company. Saks bought out Duncan's shares in the company stating: "In light of allegations of misconduct against our investor Andrew Duncan, I am assuming sole ownership and leadership of June Pictures. June Pictures is committed to a respectful work environment dedicated to producing quality films. We will continue our projects already in production and development." That same year, the company shut down.

== Filmography ==
Year	Title	Director	Notes
2016	Operator	Logan Kibens	distributed by The Orchard
2017	Joshua: Teenager vs. Superpower	Joe Piscatella	distributed by Netflix
2017	Thoroughbreds	Cory Finley	distributed by Focus Features
2017	Fun Mom Dinner	Alethea Jones	distributed by Momentum Pictures
2017	The Florida Project	Sean Baker	distributed by A24
2018	Wildlife	Paul Dano	distributed by IFC Films
2018	Dude	Olivia Milch	distributed by Netflix
2018	Book Club	Bill Holderman	distributed by Paramount Pictures
