= Louise Ford (film editor) =

British film editor

- Born: Nantwich, Cheshire, England
- Occupation: Film editor
- Years active: 2007–present
- Spouse: Andrew Ford

Louise Ford is a British film editor. She is best known for her collaborations with director Robert Eggers, which include The Witch (2015), The Lighthouse (2019), The Northman (2022), and Nosferatu (2024).

== Biography ==
Ford was born in Nantwich, Cheshire. After completing a media studies degree at the Polytechnic of Central London, she began her career as a journalist and worked as a copy/production editor for publications including The Sunday Times, Q, and Cosmopolitan. She later moved to New York City and took a six-week editing course through The Edit Center, where she met editor Michael Taylor and became his assistant. She met director Robert Eggers in 2007, when she edited his short film The Tell-Tale Heart.

== Filmography ==
Year	Title	Director	Ref.
2014	The Heart Machine	Zachary Wigon	
2015	The Witch	Robert Eggers	
2016	Don't Breathe	Fede Álvarez	
2017	Thoroughbreds	Cory Finley	
2018	Wildlife	Paul Dano	
2018	Siberia	Matthew Ross	
2019	The Lighthouse	Robert Eggers	
2019	Bad Education	Cory Finley	
2021	Things Heard & Seen	Shari Springer Berman and Robert Pulcini	
2022	The Northman	Robert Eggers	
2023	Landscape with Invisible Hand	Cory Finley	
2024	Nosferatu	Robert Eggers	
2025	Black Phone 2	Scott Derrickson	

== Awards and nominations ==
Award	Year	Category	Nominated work	Result	Ref.
Chicago Indie Critics	2025	Best Editing	Nosferatu	Nominated	
DiscussingFilm Critic Awards	2019	Best Film Editing	The Lighthouse	Nominated	
Independent Spirit Awards	2019	Best Editing	The Lighthouse	Nominated	
Indiana Film Journalists Association	2022	Best Editing	The Northman	Nominated	
Indiana Film Journalists Association	2024	Best Editing	Nosferatu	Nominated	
North Dakota Film Society	2020	Best Editing	The Lighthouse	Won	
North Dakota Film Society	2025	Best Editing	Nosferatu	Nominated	
