= Rock Springs (short story collection) =

1987 short story collection by Richard Ford

- First edition
- Author: Richard Ford
- Language: English
- Genre: Short story collection
- Published: 1987
- Publisher: Atlantic Monthly Press
- Publication place: United States
- Media type: Print (hardback & paperback)
- Pages: 235 (first edition, hardback)
- ISBN: 978-0871131591 (first edition)
- OCLC: 15548849
- Dewey Decimal: 813.54
- LC Class: PS3556.O713 R6
- Preceded by: The Sportswriter
- Followed by: Wildlife

Rock Springs is the first collection of short stories by author Richard Ford, published in 1987 by Atlantic Monthly Press.

As with his earlier novels A Piece of My Heart (1976) and The Ultimate Good Luck (1981), the stories from Ford's debut collection are notable for both their lack of sentimentality and undercurrent of menace. (Note: These early Ford stories led Granta editor Bill Buford to include Ford in his 'Dirty realism' categorization alongside fellow short-story writer Raymond Carver.) Raymond Carver selected Ford's short story "Communist" for inclusion in The Best American Short Stories 1986.

In retrospect, Rock Springs has become known as one of Ford's "Montana books", along with Wildlife (1990), and Canada (2012), since the setting for most of the stories occurs in that state.

== Contents ==
All ten stories of Rock Springs were previously published in magazines. The stories appear in the book in this sequence:

- "Rock Springs" (Esquire, February 1982)
- "Great Falls" (Granta, Spring 1987)
- "Sweethearts" (Esquire, August 1986)
- "Children" (The New Yorker, August 3, 1987)
- "Going to the Dogs" (TriQuarterly, Winter 1982)
- "Empire" (Granta, Fall 1986)
- "Winterkill" (Esquire, November 1983)
- "Optimists" (The New Yorker, March 30, 1987)
- "Fireworks" (Esquire, October 1984)
- "Communist" (Antaeus, Autumn 1985)

On the "Acknowledgements" page, Ford expresses gratitude to Gary L. Fisketjon and to L. Rust Hills for their editorial help and encouragement.

== Reception ==
Upon the publication of Rock Springs in 1987, reviews were enthusiastic and this collection was well received. In September of that year, George Johnson in The New York Times wrote:

"the finest of them achieve luminous moments, moments with potential to change how the reader sees and thinks. The stories of Rock Springs are extremely concentrated, so a reader who pays attention not only wants to turn pages but to prolong them, experience the supple, ironic, expanding and contracting medium Mr. Ford compounds from everyday speech. What distinguishes his stories from those of many contemporaries who share conventions of style and subject matter is just this personal, vital, idiomatic presence that both mirrors and critiques our habits of language."

A decade later, The Paris Review —profiling Ford for its iconic interview series— acknowledged that: "His single volume of stories has established him as a master of the genre."

In her 2012 New Yorker piece profiling Ford and his recently published novel Canada, Lorrie Moore recognized the continued influence of Ford's first story collection some 25 years after it was published:

"Ford has long made dissection of a certain unsavoriness part of his skill as a writer—he can parse spoiled masculinity like the finest of feminists—most famously in the widely anthologized short stories "Rock Springs" and "Communist." A boy's experience of adult carelessness has often been his subject."

In an interview from 2015, Nobel Prize-winning author Kazuo Ishiguro was asked "What books do you find yourself returning to again and again?" To which Ishiguro responded: "I tend not to reread whole books over and over, even my big favorites. But I do keep returning to certain short stories, the way I might to favorite pieces of music." Ishiguro mentioned "Rock Springs" (the actual story) as one of his favorite stories. (Note: The full quote: "I tend not to reread whole books over and over, even my big favorites. But I do keep returning to certain short stories, the way I might to favorite pieces of music. Richard Ford's "Rock Springs" (the actual story); Chekhov's "Ionych"; V. S. Naipaul's "Tell Me Who to Kill"; Raymond Carver's collection "Fires"; P. G. Wodehouse's "The Clicking of Cuthbert"; Conan Doyle's "Silver Blaze." And John Millington Synge's play "In the Shadow of the Glen.")

== Film adaptation ==
Ford adapted the stories "Great Falls" and "Children" into the screenplay for the 1990 film Bright Angel, directed by Michael Fields and starring Dermot Mulroney, Lili Taylor and Sam Shepard.
