= Asante Blackk =

American actor

- Born: Asante Duah Ma'at; October 20, 2000 (age 26); Waldorf, Maryland, U.S.
- Occupation: Actor
- Years active: 2007–present
- Relatives: Samira Wiley (aunt)

Asante Duah Ma'at (born October 20, 2000), known professionally as Asante Blackk, is an American actor. He is best known for his role in the miniseries When They See Us (2019), for which he received a Primetime Emmy Award nomination.

== Early life and career ==
Blackk began acting as an elementary school student at Judith P. Hoyer Montessori School. His first role was Mowgli in a performance of The Jungle Book. One of his first professional roles was in "How I Learned to Be a Kid" at the Howard Theatre in Washington, after which he got an agent. Blackk originally auditioned for the role of Korey Wise, one of the exonerated members of the Central Park Five, in the dramatized miniseries When They See Us but was instead cast as the 14-year-old Kevin Richardson in the series. The role earned him a Primetime Emmy Award nomination, making him one of the youngest nominees in its history. Blackk appeared as a series regular on This Is Us from 2019 until the show ended in May 2022, for which he was nominated for a Critics' Choice Television Award.

Blackk made his film debut in Cory Finley's Landscape with Invisible Hand, which was released in August 2023; he later appeared in Story Ave, which was released in September 2023.

== Personal life ==
He is the nephew of actress Samira Wiley.

== Filmography ==
=== Film ===
Key
†	Denotes films that have not yet been released

Year	Title	Role	Notes
2023	Landscape with Invisible Hand	Adam Campbell	
2023	Story Ave	Kadir Grayson	
2027	Get Lite †	TBA	Filming

=== Television ===
Year	Title	Role	Notes
2019	When They See Us	Kevin Richardson - Teen	4 episodes
2019	Live in Front of a Studio Audience	Self - Michael	TV special
2019–2022	This Is Us	Malik Hodges	Main role (seasons 4-6), 52 episodes
2020	Social Distance	Corey	Episode: "Pomp and Circumstance"
2021	Amend: The Fight for America	Himself	Episode: "Wait", TV miniseries
2022	Norman Lear: 100 Years of Music & Laughter	Himself	Television special
2022–2026	The Proud Family: Louder and Prouder	Kareem	Recurring voice role, 12 episodes
2026	Euphoria	Kidd	5 episodes
2026	The Drop: A Snowfall Saga	Lamar Kinsey	Main role

== Awards and nominations ==
Year	Award	Category	Work	Result	Ref.
2019	Primetime Emmy Award	Outstanding Supporting Actor in a Limited Series	When They See Us	Nominated	
2019	Black Reel Awards for Television	Outstanding Supporting Actor, Limited Series	When They See Us	Nominated	
2020	Critics' Choice Television Awards	Best Supporting Actor in a Movie/Miniseries	When They See Us	Nominated	
2020	Critics' Choice Television Awards	Best Supporting Actor in a Drama Series	This Is Us	Nominated	
2020	Black Reel Television Awards	Outstanding Supporting Actor in a Drama Series	This Is Us	Nominated	
