= The Lay of the Land =

2006 novel by Richard Ford

- First edition cover
- Author: Richard Ford
- Language: English
- Publisher: Knopf
- Publication date: October 2006
- Publication place: United States
- Media type: Print (Hardcover and Paperback)
- Pages: 496 pp
- ISBN: 0-676-97248-9
- OCLC: 68401973
- Preceded by: A Multitude of Sins
- Followed by: Canada

The Lay of the Land is a 2006 novel by American author Richard Ford. The novel is the third in what is now a five-part series, preceded by the novels The Sportswriter (1986) and Independence Day (1995); and followed by Let Me Be Frank With You (2014), a collection of "long" stories, and the novel Be Mine (2023). Each of these books follows a portion of the life of Frank Bascombe, a real estate agent.

The Lay of the Land was nominated for a 2006 National Book Critics Circle Award.

== Plot ==
The Lay of the Land takes place in the fall of 2000, and Ford's character Frank Bascome is preparing for Thanksgiving at his home in Sea-Clift, New Jersey. His son Paul, who is now a greeting card designer in Kansas City, Paul's girlfriend, who has only one hand, and Frank's daughter, Clarissa, who is an on-and-off lesbian, are all expected to attend. Frank has ordered a ready-made organic meal to be delivered on the holiday.

Frank's second wife, Sally, has reunited with her formerly AWOL and presumed-dead husband Wally, and they now live in the British Isles. Frank is in the last throes of a fight against prostate cancer, and Frank's first wife, Ann, has moved back to Haddam, New Jersey, after the death of her second husband.

Frank has started RealtyWise, his own company, and employs Mike Mahoney, a Tibetan who has adopted an American Republican lifestyle, except inasmuch as he believes in Buddhist philosophy.

Over the course of three days, Frank has a range of painful experiences with everyone he meets, including potential home buyers, the father of an old flame, his former wife, his son, and an old acquaintance whom Frank assaults in a bar. Frank's most redeeming moments as a character are in a lesbian bar where he waits for repair work on his Chevrolet Suburban, and when he gets shot in the chest by teenagers who have murdered his unlikable neighbors.

In the end, Frank and Sally are flying to the Mayo Clinic to get the final word on his prostate.

== Reception ==
The Lay of the Land received very positive reviews. Merle Rubin of The Christian Science Monitor commented that the book "bristles with energy, with a natural assurance on the part of its writer." The Sydney Morning Herald noted that "the tone of The Lay of the Land is somber, despite a few patches of high comedy, and its style is markedly introspective," adding that "Ford is such a fine writer that he pulls off a notable feat." In a review for The Observer Tim Adams of wrote "Often in the book, you feel like you could listen to Frank observing his life for ever; very occasionally, it feels like you are," adding "There's not a line in the nearly 500 pages that you would want to lose, though." The Wall Street Journal complimented the book, writing "Mr. Ford's prose, however, is far from dull; virtuosic flights and crescendos animate passages that we might otherwise think we could do without." In contrast, Michiko Kakutani at The New York Times called the book "lethargic" and a "padded, static production."
