= Nothing to Declare (short story) =

- Short story by Richard Ford
- Country: United States
- Language: English

Publication
- Published in: Sorry for Your Trouble: Stories
- Publication date: 2020

"Nothing to Declare" is a short story by Richard Ford first appearing in the collection Sorry for Your Trouble: Stories in 2020, and published by Ecco Press. Two former lovers, Sandy McGuinness and Alix, suddenly cross paths after thirty-five years. The story examines the limits of memory, and the regrets and discontentments that emerge from reexamining life's inflection points.

== Plot ==
"Nothing to Declare" is set in New Orleans during Mardi Gras. The story is narrated in the first-person by male protagonist Sandy McGuinness.

In his mid-fifties, McGuinness is an attorney for a firm that insures and finances supertanker operations. He lives in New Orleans with his wife, Pricilla, and their two teenage children.

At an afternoon business luncheon, McGuinness notices among his tipsy associates an attractive older woman he vaguely recognizes, addressed by the men jocularly as "Miss Nail". She had arrived with a client, now departed, and she, too, is intoxicated. Her glance confirms that she recognizes McGuinness.

In a brief flashback, McGuinness recalls that he had known her as Barbara when they attended Ithaca thirty-five years ago in 1981. Both of them have upper-middle-class backgrounds: her parents were "exotic" artists, his a more conventional family comprising a teacher and a lawyer.

Then both 20 years old, McGuinness was infatuated with Barbara. They booked a budget flight to Reykjavík for spring break. and enjoy a sojourned in a sod hut on a remote fiord, making love. Barbara invents a whimsical genealogy for her family: Her fictional father is of Navaho ancestry and a blacklisted film director; her mother a French courtesan. She admits to lesbian affairs. Each secretly evaluates one another as potential life mates.

Considering a career as a veterinarian, McGuinness takes leave; Barbara remains on the island to study Icelandic mythical sagas. She tells him on parting: "You know, sweetheart, we don't want anyone else once we know who we are. It's a very hard choice to make." McGuinnis dismisses the remark and departs without regret.

McGuinness remains vaguely aware of Barbara's apparently conventional life trajectory in the ensuing years. He relegates their Iceland tryst to mere footnotes about an adventure he had with a girl.

The narrative returns to New Orleans. "Miss Nail" identifies herself as Alix. Nonetheless, McGuinness admits to himself she is indeed the Barbara of his youth. Her remarks suggest that she serves an expensive escort for well-heeled clients in the commercial industry. Alix confesses that she had tracked him to New Orleans, and invites him to take a walk outdoors among the carnival revelers.

McGuinnis is loath to admit to himself that he has perhaps thought of Barbara/Alix every day for the past 35 years. As they walk, she asks if she may kiss him, and McGuinness declines. Their small talk is laden with innuendo and regret.

Rather than accept Barbara's invitation to her hotel suite, McGuinnis dutifully departs for a scheduled rendezvous with Pricilla.

== Theme ==
Critic Christopher Linforth at The Southern Review of Books notes that "Nothing to Declare"—the opening story of the collection—"sets the tone for the book." An examination of the "missed chances and what-ifs" inherent in life, "Nothing to Declare" ends where it begins, without any satisfactory resolution to the encounter between Sandy and Alix. Linforth observes that the "story's scope becomes an elegant portrayal" of memory and desire.

Literary critic Rand Richards Cooper in The New York Times finds the story "drenched in retrospection," where the protagonists "take the measure of old regrets, and sample rancors that have lost their bitterness with time."

Cooper adds: "These are stories about the death of stories."

== Style ==
Literary critic Rand Richards Cooper notes the influence of Ernest Hemingway and F. Scott Fitzgerald in Ford's "sparkling" prose and "nimble interior monologues." From the first story in the collection, "Nothing to Declare," Cooper cites this "Hemingwayesque" passage:

He had thought about her every single day. Though he'd thought about many other things as often. To be thinking about something didn't mean what people said it meant.

From the same story, Cooper locates this echo from Fitzgerald:

They were at the great river now, where the air expanded and went outward, floated up and away in a limitless moment before returning to the vast, curving, mythical, lusterless flood.

Cooper declares that Ford is among the last of that generation of American writers directly influenced by the great post-World War I American literary stylists.

== Sources ==
- Cooper, Rand Richards. 2020. "In Richard Ford's New Stories, Ambivalence Is the Default Condition." New York Times, May 12, 2020. In Richard Ford's New Stories, Ambivalence Is the Default Condition Accessed 2 December 2024.
- Richard Ford. 2020. Sorry for Your Trouble. Ecco Press, an imprint of Harper Collins, New York. ISBN 978-0-06-296980-4
- Linforth, Christopher. 2021. "Missed Chances and What-Ifs in "Sorry for Your Troubles"Southern Review of Books, May 10, 2021. Missed Chances and What-Ifs in "Sorry for Your Trouble" Accessed December 5, 2024.
