= Sorry for Your Trouble: Stories =

Sorry for Your Trouble
- First edition cover
- Author: Richard Ford
- Language: English
- Genre: Short story collection
- Publisher: Ecco Press
- Publication date: 2020
- Publication place: USA
- Media type: Print (hardcover)
- Pages: 258
- ISBN: 978-0-06-296980-4

Sorry for Your Trouble: Stories is a collection of short fiction by Richard Ford published in 2020 by Ecco Press.

The nine stories in the volume deal largely with death and divorce among aging middle-class Americans, and the interior narratives of regret and disappointment that preoccupy them.

== Stories ==
- "Nothing to Declare"
- "Happy"
- "Displaced"
- "Crossing"
- "The Run of Yourself"
- "Jimmy Green - 1992"
- "Leaving for Kenosha"
- "A Free Day"
- "Second Language"

== Reception ==
Literary critic Rand Richards Cooper in the New York Times praises the stories for their "trenchant and at times thrillingly downbeat realism." Cooper defends Ford against those reviewers who would disparage his work as merely "well-crafted, writing-class" stories. He extols the stories for their "acutely described settings, pitch-perfect dialogue, inner lives vividly evoked, complex protagonists brought toward difficult recognitions."

Literary critic Erica Wagner, writing for The Guardian, describes the quality of the collection as "uneven," and faults Ford for "a laziness of observation which mars" most of the stories.

Wagner reserves praise for exactly one of the stories, "the one that's worth waiting for" at the end of the volume: "Second Language." From a feminist perspective, the reviewer detects a weakness for "slack" character portraits, particularly in Ford's treatment of his female protagonists. Wagner laments that Ford, whose work "has always been distinguished by the precision of his observation and his thoughtful dissection of American life" is here largely limited to examining the "tribulations" of aging middle-class males, in treatments devoid of "wisdom and sensitivity."

Writing in The Southern Review of Books, critic Christopher Linforth calls the stories "dazzling" in their in "theme and variation", placing these works in the realm of those written by Irish novelist William Trevor, but in Ford's treatment generating a "greater sense of irony and disenchantment, that the characters' lives could have been more."

Locating the volume's themes in "Death, divorce, ageing and the whiff of disappointment of lives lived and misunderstood" critic Katie Law at The Standard offers this decisive approbation:

"Ford's idiosyncratic style conveys his characters' bafflements, both with each other and themselves, and sentences demand careful reading and occasional rereading...The writing is full of the most marvellous gems, absolute truths that linger long after finishing the stories."

== Style ==
Literary critic Rand Richards Cooper notes the influence of Ernest Hemingway and F. Scott Fitzgerald in Ford's "sparkling" prose and "nimble interior monologues."

From the first story in the collection, "Nothing to Declare," Cooper cites this "Hemingwayesque" passage:

He had thought about her every single day. Though he'd thought about many other things as often. To be thinking about something didn't mean what people said it meant.

From the same story, Cooper detects an echo from Fitzgerald:

They were at the great river now, where the air expanded and went outward, floated up and away in a limitless moment before returning to the vast, curving, mythical, lusterless flood.

Cooper declares that Ford is among the last of that generation of American writers directly influenced by the great post-World War I American literary stylists.

== Sources ==
- Cooper, Rand Richards. 2020. "In Richard Ford's New Stories, Ambivalence Is the Default Condition." New York Times, May 12, 2020.
- Richard Ford. 2020. Sorry for Your Trouble. Ecco Press, an imprint of Harper Collins, New York. ISBN 978-0-06-296980-4
- Law, Katie. 2020. Book review: "Sorry For Your Trouble by Richard Ford." The Standard, May 14, 2020.
- Linforth, Christopher. 2021. "Missed Chances and What-Ifs in "Sorry for Your Troubles"Southern Review of Books, May 10, 2021.
- Wagner, Erica. 2020. "Sorry for Your Trouble by Richard Ford review – stories of discontent." The Guardian, May 27, 2020.
