= Bright Angel =

1990 American drama film

- Theatrical release poster
- Directed by: Michael Fields
- Screenplay by: Richard Ford
- Based on: "Great Falls" and "Children" by Richard Ford
- Produced by: Paige Simpson; Robert MacLean
- Starring: Dermot Mulroney; Lili Taylor; Valerie Perrine; Bill Pullman; Mary Kay Place; Burt Young; Sam Shepard
- Cinematography: Elliot Davis
- Edited by: Melody London; Clement Barclay
- Music by: Christopher Young
- Production company: Hemdale Film Corporation
- Distributed by: Hemdale Film Corporation
- Release dates: August 25, 1990 (MWFF); June 14, 1991 (United States)
- Running time: 93 minutes
- Country: United States
- Language: English
- Box office: $158,243

Bright Angel is a 1990 American drama film directed by Michael Fields in his feature debut, and starring Dermot Mulroney, Lili Taylor, and Sam Shepard. The film follows George and the transient Lucy, who travel from their home in Montana to Wyoming in order to help Lucy's brother escape from jail. The screenplay by Richard Ford is based on the short stories "Great Falls" and "Children" from Ford's 1987 collection Rock Springs.

Although it received some critical acclaim, the film earned only $158,243 at the domestic box office.

== Plot ==
George is a Montana boy whose sanity is deteriorating due to his parents' marital woes. He links up with Lucy, a runaway headed for Wyoming with a dark background who is trying to get her brother out of jail. George tries to help her, but finds himself crossing paths with people even more emotionally disturbed than his mother and father, what she thought impossible.

== Cast ==
- Dermot Mulroney as George
- Lili Taylor as Lucy
- Valerie Perrine as Aileen
- Bill Pullman as Bob
- Mary Kay Place as Judy
- Burt Young as Art
- Sam Shepard as Jack
- Benjamin Bratt as Claude
- Delroy Lindo as Harley
- Will Patton as Woody
- Sheila McCarthy as Nina

== Production ==
Principal photography began on July 10, 1989. The film was shot on location in Billings and Broadview, Montana and in Wyoming. Filming wrapped on August 30, 1989.

The shoot was reportedly tumultuous for Lili Taylor, who was nearly fired over aesthetic decisions she'd made in presenting herself as the character. In a 2016 interview, she referred to it as the single most difficult film shoot in her career, stating that she had essentially been fired from the project, but was forced to finish her work on the film.

== Critical reception ==
Roger Ebert of the Chicago Sun-Times enjoyed the film and gave it 3 1/2 stars:

There is a moment in every good movie when it becomes clear that the director knows what he is doing. In Michael Fields' Bright Angel, that moment comes when the son and the father come home, and find that the mother has been fooling around with another man... Movies like this (I am also reminded of Terrence Malick's Badlands and Days of Heaven) depend so much on actors for the right tone, and Lili Taylor and Dermot Mulroney are perfectly matched to the material.

However, reviews such as Kathleen Maher of The Austin Chronicle did not think highly of it, gave it 2 stars and had differing views of the acting:

Someone, it seems, has been watchin too many '70s road pictures and reading Jim Thompson novels way too late at night... Unfortunately, there's not much of a whole story here. It's an intricate collage without a frame. Taylor, a hypnotic screen presence visually is, otherwise, a pain in the ass with constant wisecracks delivered as if she's imitating Christian Slater imitating Jack Nicholson and adding a Canadian accent for good measure. She's been better in Mystic Pizza and in Say Anything.... Mulroney, on the other hand, may be just another pretty face, because he usually just stands around with his hands in his pockets. One thing for sure, all of these people are capable of better work, wait for it.

== Soundtrack ==
- "Where Did God Go?" by Jody Alan Sweet
- "Too Long Crying" by Jody Alan Sweet
- "Cheshire" by Jody Alan Sweet
- "Heal Somebody" by Sheryl Crow
- "Hung Over Heart" by Jody Alan Sweet
