= The Sportswriter =

1986 novel by Richard Ford

- First edition
- Author: Richard Ford
- Cover artist: Louie (design), Rick Lovell (illustration)
- Language: English
- Publisher: Vintage
- Publication date: March 1986
- Publication place: United States
- Media type: Print (Hardback & Paperback)
- Pages: 375 pp
- ISBN: 0-394-74325-3
- OCLC: 13093238
- Dewey Decimal: 813/.54 19
- LC Class: PS3556.O713 S6 1986
- Preceded by: The Ultimate Good Luck
- Followed by: Rock Springs

The Sportswriter is a 1986 novel by Richard Ford, and the first of five books of fiction to feature the protagonist Frank Bascombe. In The Sportswriter, Bascombe is portrayed as a failed novelist turned sportswriter who undergoes an existential crisis following the death of his son. The sequel to The Sportswriter is the Pulitzer Prize-winning Independence Day, published in 1995. After the third installment in the series, titled The Lay of the Land, was published in 2006, the three books together are sometimes identified as "The Bascombe Trilogy." Ford called them "The Bascombe Novels." In 2014, a fourth book in the series, titled Let Me Be Frank With You, was published. The latest book in the Bascombe series, titled Be Mine, was published in 2023.

In 2007, HBO announced that it was adapting the books into a six-hour HBO miniseries, but HBO subsequently dropped their option and any future plans to adapt the novels for the screen were shelved.

When it appeared in 1986, The Sportswriter was Ford's third published novel.

== Awards and nominations ==
The novel was named one of Time magazine's five best books of 1986 and was a finalist for the PEN/Faulkner Award for Fiction. In 2005, Time also named it one of the 100 best novels in English from 1923 to 2010.
