= Wildlife (film) =

2018 film by Paul Dano

- Theatrical release poster
- Directed by: Paul Dano
- Screenplay by: Paul Dano; Zoe Kazan
- Based on: Wildlife by Richard Ford
- Produced by: Andrew Duncan; Alex Saks; Paul Dano; Oren Moverman; Ann Ruark; Jake Gyllenhaal; Riva Marker
- Starring: Carey Mulligan; Jake Gyllenhaal; Ed Oxenbould; Bill Camp
- Cinematography: Diego Garcia
- Edited by: Matthew Hannam; Louise Ford
- Music by: David Lang
- Production companies: June Pictures; Sight Unseen Pictures; Nine Stories Productions
- Distributed by: IFC Films
- Release dates: January 20, 2018 (Sundance); October 19, 2018 (United States)
- Running time: 104 minutes
- Country: United States
- Language: English
- Box office: $3.7 million

Wildlife is a 2018 American drama film directed and co-produced by Paul Dano, in his directorial debut, from a screenplay by Dano and Zoe Kazan, based on the 1990 novel by Richard Ford. It stars Carey Mulligan, Jake Gyllenhaal (who also co-produced), Ed Oxenbould, and Bill Camp.

It had its world premiere at the Sundance Film Festival on January 20, 2018, and began a limited theatrical release in the United States on October 19, 2018. It received critical acclaim, with praise for Dano's direction and the performances of Mulligan, Gyllenhaal, and Oxenbould. It was nominated for three Independent Spirit Awards, including Best First Feature and Best Female Lead for Mulligan.

== Plot ==
In 1960, Jeannette and Jerry Brinson have recently moved to Great Falls, Montana, with their teenage son Joe. Tensions build after Jerry is fired from a job as a golf pro at a country club. He is offered his old job back but refuses out of pride, and instead of looking for work, he sleeps in his car and watches the local firefighting efforts against a forest fire raging in nearby mountains. To support the family as Jerry looks for a job, Jeannette takes a job as a swimming instructor (although she tries first to get a job teaching at school). Joe gives up football after school to work part-time at a local photography studio. One day, Jerry decides to take a low-paying job fighting the forest fire, which upsets Jeannette and worries Joe. Jeannette speaks openly about her strained marriage with Jerry to Joe, and the stress of the situation takes a minor toll on Joe's school life.

While Jerry is away, Jeannette tells her son they may have to move to a smaller place as they cannot afford their small rented house. She introduces Joe to Warren Miller, a prosperous older man who owns an automobile dealership. She says she taught him to swim and he has offered her a job.

Joe is repeatedly left alone as Jeannette spends time with Miller and Jeannette opens up about her dissatisfaction with her husband's restlessness. Joe wakes one morning and his mother is absent. He goes to Miller's car dealership, but the receptionist does not know who his mother is.

One night, after a dinner hosted by Miller, Miller dances with a drunken Jeannette and kisses her; he spends the night at Joe's house, which a shocked Joe discovers later that night. After Miller leaves, Joe confronts Jeannette about the affair. Jeannette does not admit to caring about Miller or no longer loving Jerry, but concedes that the affair will make their life financially better, and she implores Joe to think of a better plan for her. He tells her that he cannot. The next morning, Joe packs up some of his belongings and heads to a bus stop. As the bus arrives it begins to snow, signaling the end of the wildfires, and Joe returns home.

Jerry returns and is met with a lukewarm reception by Jeannette, who reveals that she has begun renting an apartment in town, and Joe is free to stay with her. Devastated and suspecting an affair, Jerry asks Jeannette to admit to her relationship. Furious upon hearing that Miller slept with Jeannette in the family house, Jerry drunkenly goes to Miller's house and tries to set it ablaze. Miller catches him in the act and confronts him, admonishing him about his behavior with Joe present. When an injured Jerry pleads with Joe to help him escape before the police arrive, Joe flees on foot to the police station, where he discovers his father has not been arrested. Returning to the house, he learns from Jerry that Miller will not press charges, but his parents' marriage is over.

Jeannette moves to Portland, Oregon, to teach, while Joe lives peacefully with Jerry, who has become a successful salesman. Jeannette returns spontaneously one weekend to a strained, but polite, reunion, where she learns Joe has been promoted and is on the honor roll. Joe takes his parents to the photography studio, where he requests that they take a family portrait for his sake. An uncomfortable Jeannette is initially reluctant, but accepts, and the family takes one final portrait together.

== Cast ==
- Ed Oxenbould as Joe Brinson
- Carey Mulligan as Jeanette Brinson
- Jake Gyllenhaal as Jerry Brinson
- Bill Camp as Warren Miller
- Zoe Margaret Colletti as Ruth-Ann
- Darryl Cox as Clarence Snow
- Travis Bruyer as the Forester
- Mollie Milligan as Esther

== Production ==
=== Development ===
In July 2016, it was announced that Paul Dano would adapt Richard Ford's novel with a script he had co-written with Zoe Kazan, and that neither Dano nor Kazan would act in the film. Dano said, "in Richard's book I saw myself and many others. I have always wanted to make films—and have always known I would make films about family." He has also said that this is the first in a series of films he wants to make about dysfunctional families. The film was produced by June Pictures and Nine Stories Productions.

In September 2016, it was announced that Jake Gyllenhaal and Carey Mulligan would star in the film. American composer David Lang wrote the score.

=== Filming ===
Principal photography took place in Montana and Oklahoma (due to concerns with the winter weather in Montana).

== Release ==
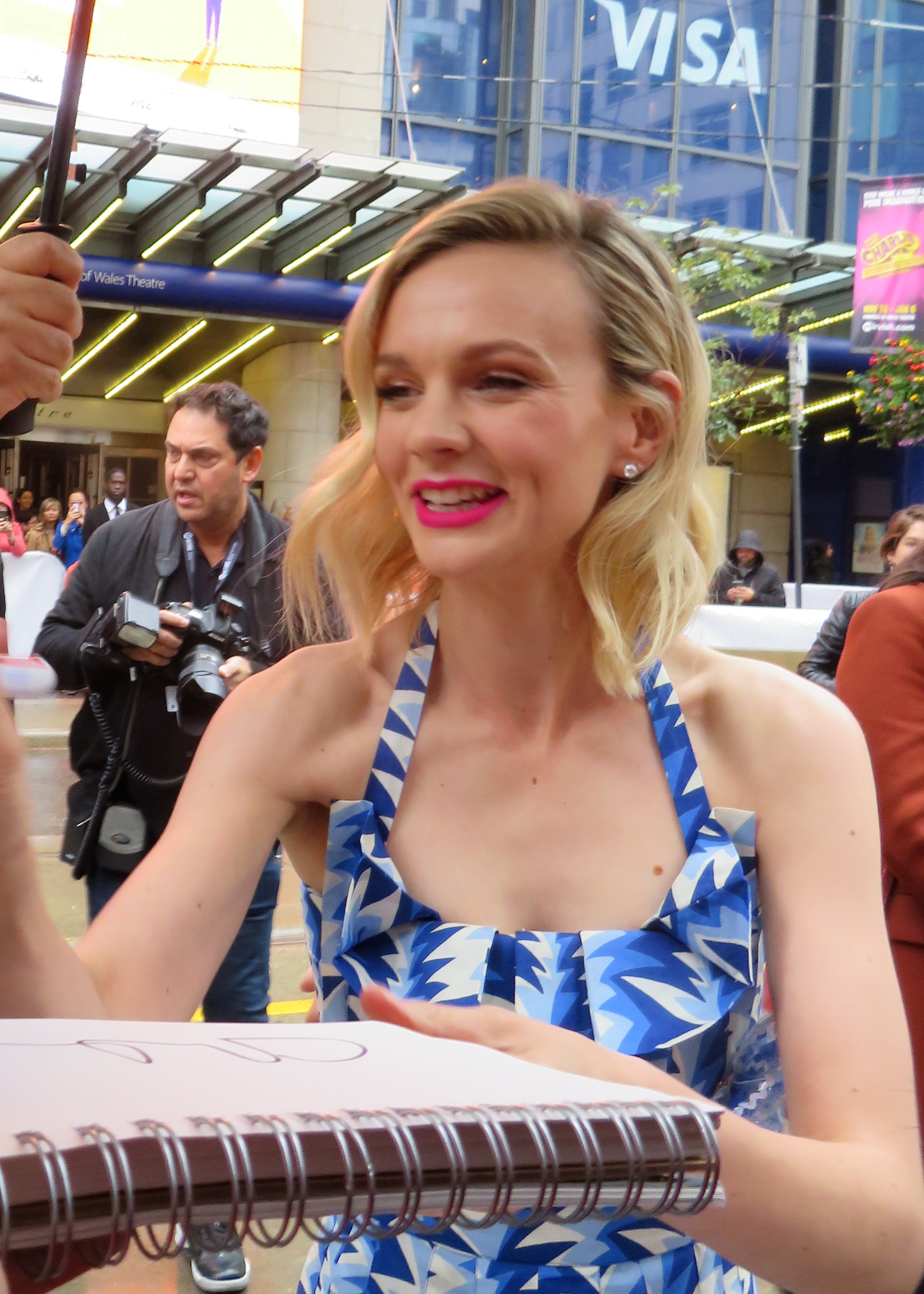
Carey Mulligan at TIFF showing (September, 2018)

The film had its world premiere at the Sundance Film Festival on January 20, 2018. Shortly after, IFC Films acquired North American distribution rights to the film. It screened at the Cannes Film Festival on May 9, 2018. It also screened at the Toronto International Film Festival on September 6, 2018, the New York Film Festival on September 30, 2018, the Woodstock Film Festival on October 13, 2018, and the New Orleans Film Festival on October 18, 2018. Wildlife was released in the United States on October 19, 2018.

== Reception ==
=== Critical response ===
On review aggregation website Rotten Tomatoes, the film holds an approval rating of 94% based on 216 reviews, and an average rating of 7.7/10. The website's critical consensus reads, "Wildlife's portrait of a family in crisis is beautifully composed by director Paul Dano -- and brought brilliantly to life by a career-best performance from Carey Mulligan." On Metacritic, the film has a weighted average score of 80 out of 100, based on reviews from 41 critics, indicating "generally favorable reviews".

The New York Times critic Glenn Kenny called Wildlife a "superb film", calling it "a domestic drama both sad and terrifying". Kenny praised the cast for "exceptional" acting, and said that Mulligan "gives the best performance of any I’ve seen in film this year". He called Oxenbould "an exciting find" and stated of Dano's direction as "meticulous in every respect, which enables him to keep the characters at a remove that is both cleareyed and compassionate. The sharp cinematography by Diego Garcia is ideal for Dano’s purpose. The whole of the film is a potent collaboration in every respect, and a remarkable directorial debut."

Writing for RogerEbert.com, Brian Tallerico gave the film 3.5 out of 4 stars, saying, "This is an accomplished, moving piece of filmmaking, one that cares about its characters and trusts its performers. It comes from a relatively old school of dramatic storytelling but it connects emotionally because of Dano’s tender but confident work and what he’s able to draw from two of the best performers of their generation." Variety's Owen Gleiberman called Dano "a natural-born filmmaker, with an eye for elegant spare compositions that refrain from being too showy" and gave the film 4 out of 5 stars.

David Edelstein, writing for Vulture gave the film full marks, calling the film "superb", saying "[Dano] gives his actors space so that the rhythms are their own, and they hold us through the tough final scenes and bittersweet ending." The Guardian's Jordan Hoffman gave the film three stars out of five, saying "It is a quiet, subtle story and, as is so often the case when an actor takes their first trip behind the camera, a showcase for terrific performances."

== Home video ==
On February 14, 2020, it was announced that The Criterion Collection selected the film to be released on DVD and Blu-ray.

The release includes interviews with director Paul Dano, screenwriter Zoe Kazan, actors Carey Mulligan and Jake Gyllenhaal, cinematographer Diego García, production designer Akin McKenzie, and costume designer Amanda Ford, as well as new conversations on the film's postproduction with Dano, editor Matthew Hannam, and composer David Lang. Also included is a Film at Lincoln Center conversation from 2018 between Dano and novelist Richard Ford about the film's source material and a booklet with an essay by critic Mark Harris.

== Awards and nominations ==
Year	Award	Category	Nominated work	Result	Ref.
2018	Cannes Film Festival	Caméra d'Or	Wildlife	Nominated	
2018	Sundance Film Festival	Grand Jury Prize	Paul Dano	Nominated	
2019	Broadcast Film Critics Association	Best Young Performer	Ed Oxenbould	Nominated	
2019	Independent Spirit Awards	Best Female Lead	Carey Mulligan	Nominated	
2019	Independent Spirit Awards	Best First Feature	Paul Dano	Nominated	
2019	Independent Spirit Awards	Best Cinematography	Diego Garcia	Nominated	
2018	London Film Festival	First Feature	Wildlife	Nominated	
2018	Torino Film Festival	Best Feature Film	Paul Dano	Won	
2018	Zurich Film Festival	Best International Feature Film	Paul Dano	Nominated	
2018	Las Vegas Film Critics Society	Best Film	Wildlife	9th Place	
2018	Las Vegas Film Critics Society	Youth in Film - Male	Ed Oxenbould	Won	
