= Dude (2018 film) =

2018 film by Olivia Milch

- Release poster
- Directed by: Olivia Milch
- Screenplay by: Olivia Milch
- Story by: Kendall McKinnon; Olivia Milch
- Produced by: Heather Rae; Langley Perer; Alex Saks; Andrew Duncan; Jen Isaacson
- Starring: Lucy Hale; Kathryn Prescott; Alexandra Shipp; Awkwafina; Alex Wolff
- Cinematography: Hilary Spara
- Edited by: Annette Davey
- Music by: Mark Batson
- Production companies: June Pictures; Mosaic Media Group; RadicalMedia; Puny Voice
- Distributed by: Netflix
- Release date: April 20, 2018
- Running time: 97 minutes
- Country: United States
- Language: English

Dude is a 2018 American coming-of-age comedy-drama film directed by Olivia Milch and written by Milch and Kendall McKinnon. The film stars Lucy Hale, Kathryn Prescott, Alexandra Shipp, Awkwafina, Austin Butler, and Michaela Watkins.

It was released on Netflix on April 20, 2018.

== Plot ==
Best friends Lily, Chloe, Amelia, and Rebecca are at junior prom, where Chloe's brother Thomas shares a tender moment with Lily while discussing his upcoming move to college. As they are about to kiss, they are interrupted by their friends. On his way home from prom, Thomas is killed in a car crash.

A year later, the girls are in their final two weeks of high school. Chloe and Lily dream of attending college in New York City together, with the former attending NYU and the latter attending Columbia. Rebecca develops a crush on the school librarian, Mr. Bemis, while Amelia navigates her parents' divorce. Despite their challenges, the group decides to go to prom together.

While Lily is swamped with planning school celebrations, Chloe struggles with her grief. She is accepted to NYU, but contemplates going to UCSB instead to stay close to her family. Her friend Sam consoles her and asks her to prom, which she accepts.

Lily begins delegating responsibilities as Noah promposes to her via serenade, which she declines, yet they make out at a party afterwards. At another party, Chloe reveals her intention to attend UCSB, which upsets Lily. She retreats to a bedroom with Mike—whom she met earlier—and he rapes her.

Lily confronts the girls for ditching her at the party and keeping Chloe's acceptance into NYU from her, and they reprimand her for her selfishness as they navigate their own struggles. She then complains to Noah over his ex's jealous comments, and he maintains he is solely interested in Lily, which she rebuffs and leaves him.

After her brother helps her realize her selfishness, Lily apologizes to the girls. It is revealed in a flashback that Thomas and Lily kissed and professed their mutual love at junior prom. She reconciles with Noah and the group celebrates.

Lily successfully gives her valedictorian speech at graduation, and her and Noah share a kiss. At their graduation party, Mr. Bemis introduces himself to Rebecca as "Immanuel", sharing a name with the philosopher they previously joked about, and she introduces him to her parents. The girls enjoy one last joint together overlooking the city.

== Cast ==
- Lucy Hale as Lily
- Kathryn Prescott as Chloe Daniels
- Alexandra Shipp as Amelia
- Awkwafina as Rebecca
- Alex Wolff as Noah
- Brooke Smith as Lorraine Daniels
- Jerry MacKinnon as Sam
- Ronen Rubinstein as Mike
- Satya Bhabha as Immanuel Bemis
- Sydney Lucas as Olivia
- Nora Dunn as Rosa
- Ian Gomez as Jerry
- Colton Dunn as Officer Higgins
- Austin Abrams as James
- Austin Butler as Thomas Daniels
- Michaela Watkins as Jill
- Jack McBrayer as Guy
- Sasha Spielberg as Carrie
- Claudia Doumit as Jessica
- Artemis Pebdani as Sapphire
- Esther Povitsky as Alicia
- Stony Blyden as Stony

== Production ==
On November 2, 2015, it was announced that Olivia Milch would make her directorial debut with the comedy film, titled Dude, based on her own script about four best high school girlfriends, with Lucy Hale starring. The script was listed in the 2013 Black List of best-unproduced scripts. Heather Rae, Langley Perer, Jimmy Miller, Andrew Duncan, and Jen Isaacson produced the film. The same month, Kathryn Prescott, Alexandra Shipp, Awkwafina, Alex Wolff, Satya Bhabha, Ronen Rubinstein and Austin Butler joined the cast of the film. In December 2015, Austin Abrams and Jerry McKinnon were also added.

=== Filming ===
Principal photography on the film began on November 30, 2015, in Los Angeles.

== Release ==
In May 2017, Netflix acquired distribution rights to the film. They released the film on their service on April 20, 2018.
