= Landscape with Invisible Hand =

2023 film by Cory Finley

- Theatrical release poster
- Directed by: Cory Finley
- Screenplay by: Cory Finley
- Based on: Landscape with Invisible Hand by M. T. Anderson
- Produced by: Dede Gardner; Jeremy Kleiner
- Starring: Asante Blackk; Kylie Rogers; Tiffany Haddish
- Cinematography: Lyle Vincent
- Edited by: Louise Ford
- Music by: Michael Abels
- Production companies: Plan B Entertainment; Annapurna Pictures
- Distributed by: Metro-Goldwyn-Mayer
- Release dates: January 23, 2023 (Sundance); August 18, 2023 (United States)
- Running time: 105 minutes
- Country: United States
- Language: English
- Box office: $203,403

Landscape with Invisible Hand is a 2023 American science fiction film written and directed by Cory Finley, based on the 2017 novel of the same name by M. T. Anderson. The film stars Asante Blackk, Kylie Rogers, and Tiffany Haddish. Humans struggle in a future economy after aliens come to Earth and become the de facto ruling class. A teenage boy continues painting regardless of world events. The rapid upset in the class system forces him, his girlfriend, and their families to adapt.

Landscape with Invisible Hand premiered at the Sundance Film Festival on January 23, 2023, and was released to theaters in the United States by Metro-Goldwyn-Mayer on August 18, 2023.

== Plot ==
By the year 2036, an alien race called the Vuvv have taken over Earth. Their presence has caused unemployment and homelessness due to their new established order, but they attempt to make humans believe that their arrival has benefited them. Teenager Adam Campbell is an aspiring artist living with his lawyer mother Beth and sister Natalie. Just as he is getting ready for school, a Vuvv city ship parks itself right above his house.

At school, the Vuvv use nodes to educate the students and continue their propaganda to make it seem like things are better with them around. The students' teacher, Mr. Stanley, announces that the Vuvv have deemed him redundant and are eliminating his job in favor of pre-recorded lessons. After school, Adam begins to chat with a classmate, Chloe Marsh. Just as they are walking home, they hear a gunshot and see that Mr. Stanley has committed suicide outside the school.

Adam gets to know Chloe better and learns that she lives with her father and older brother Hunter. Their living situation isn't good, so Adam, having become smitten with Chloe, asks Beth if it is okay that they stay there until they are back on their feet. Although reluctant, Beth agrees to it.

Adam and Chloe begin to form a relationship. After seeing that both of their parents are struggling financially, Chloe suggests that they broadcast their relationship to the Vuvv to earn currency, as the Vuvv view human relationships the way one views their favorite TV show. The two begin to use their nodes to broadcast every aspect of their relationship, from going to school and spending time together at home, resulting in them earning good money and helping make the house nicer. However, this starts to become a problem for Adam, who thinks Chloe will only be around him with the nodes on.

Adam and Chloe attend the homecoming dance and see another couple broadcasting their own relationship, which annoys Chloe and makes her antagonize the other couple. Adam is bothered and wants to take the nodes off, but Chloe refuses. When they get home, they see Beth confronting Hunter and Mr. Marsh because they used her computer without asking permission, and Mr. Marsh is also upset at Beth insinuating that he poorly raised Hunter and Chloe.

The increasing stress and drama takes its toll on Adam and Chloe, and the Vuvv can see that they are forcing their expressions, resulting in lower income. The two then receive a summons from the Vuvv higher-ups, as they are being sued. Adam and Chloe ride their way up to the Vuvv city and are taken to an official Vuvv representative called Shirley. She tells the two that they are deceiving the Vuvv by broadcasting their relationship when their emotions are no longer genuine. They are given two options: return all the money that was paid to them (which they already spent), or both of their families will be in debt to the Vuvv for six generations.

Adam tells Beth about their predicament, so she goes to visit the Vuvv herself and tries to use her lawyer skills to strike a deal. Beth meets with Shirley and is unable to convince her to change her mind about the punishment levied against her son and his girlfriend, but she recalls a moment earlier in the waiting room when she encountered another curious-looking Vuvv. Shirley says the Vuvv is her offspring, and Beth convinces Shirley to allow the offspring to live with Beth as her husband so that he can get a real taste of human emotions and affection, which would in turn allow them to keep receiving income.

Beth begins living with the Vuvv offspring, who wishes to be called "Father". He quickly begins to get on Beth's nerves with his demands and putting her down, saying she does not have to work because he is the provider. Adam also begins to hate Father and openly disrespects him.

One night, Adam’s father quietly comes into the house while Beth and Natalie are asleep. He has a brief chat with Adam over the things he has missed since he left. He asks Adam if Beth hates him. Before he can respond, Adam excuses himself for a moment and his father sees his wife sleeping in bed with the Vuvv offspring. When Adam comes back, he finds his father already walking down the street alone.

Beth ends up getting a job working at a soup restaurant. Father attempts to stop her from going, but Beth simply picks him up and gets him out of her way, declaring that working would be better than wasting her time at home with him. Later, Adam and Chloe find that Mr. Marsh has decided to assume the housewife role to Father so that he, Hunter and Chloe can live above the basement where Beth had confined them to. It is clear that Mr. Marsh hates it because he is wearing a wig and apron that Father got for Beth and he must now wear it.

Adam continues to paint and do artwork. The school shuts down due to all of the teaching staff getting laid off by the Vuvv. Adam paints an extensive mural on the wall outside the building. Later on, people gather around the mural before Shirley, Father, and a third Vuvv arrive. Adam explains that humanity has lost a lot since the Vuvv arrived, but they have also overcome a lot, so the mural is his monument to human resilience. The Vuvv then decide to hire Adam to be their personal artist to spread artwork across the galaxy, which would also earn him over $2 million. He celebrates at home with Beth and Natalie while Hunter and Mr. Marsh bemoan the Campbells' happiness.

Adam is taken in an orb to the Vuvv ship where he is told what his task will be and that he will give a speech to the other Vuvv. When Adam is presented before the council, he is told that his mural was brought onto the ship with some "minor" adjustments. The Vuvv have drawn stupid cartoony faces on the people on the mural, along with phony quotes thanking the Vuvv for their arrival. When one of the Vuvv tells Adam to discuss how art made him overcome humanity's barbaric nature, he says he cannot do this and gets in an orb back to Earth in front of his house. He tells Beth and Natalie that he failed them because he declined the contract, but Beth is just happy to have her son and says he did not fail.

Adam goes back to the school where he finds Chloe. She tells Adam she is sorry the contract didn't work out and thinks it is messed up that the Vuvv took his art with them. He begins to paint something new on a different wall, and he invites Chloe to help him. A final title card states that the work-in-progress mural will be called "Landscape with Invisible Hand".

== Cast ==
- Asante Blackk as Adam Campbell
- Tiffany Haddish as Beth Campbell
- Kylie Rogers as Chloe Marsh
- Brooklynn MacKinzie as Natalie Campbell
- Josh Hamilton as Mr. Marsh
- Michael Gandolfini as Hunter Marsh
- Christian Adam as Zach
- John Newberg as Mr. Stanley
- William Jackson Harper as Mr. Campbell

== Production ==
On November 14, 2017, it was announced that Plan B Entertainment had optioned the film adaptation rights to M. T. Anderson's recently published novel Landscape with Invisible Hand. Annapurna Pictures was set to co-produce the film under Plan B's three-year overall deal with the company. There were no further developments on the project until December 18, 2020, when it was announced that Plan B had signed a second-look film deal with Metro-Goldwyn-Mayer (MGM), who were set to produce the film as well as distribute it through United Artists Releasing, and Cory Finley was attached to adapt the screenplay and direct the film.

On January 4, 2021, Tiffany Haddish was cast in a main role. On June 28, 2021, Asante Blackk was cast in the lead role. Kylie Rogers joined the main cast on September 20, 2021. In February 2022, it was reported that Clifton Collins Jr., Michael Gandolfini, Josh Hamilton and Brooklynn MacKinzie were added to the cast.

Principal photography began on February 1, 2022, in Atlanta, and wrapped there on March 27, 2022.

== Release ==
Landscape with Invisible Hand had its world premiere at the 2023 Sundance Film Festival. During the post-screening discussion, an audience member criticized the studio-backed film's appearance at the independent film festival, leading Haddish to defend the producers and Sundance's programmers.

The film was released theatrically by MGM on August 18, 2023.

Landscape with Invisible Hand was released for digital platforms on September 8, 2023. It was later released on Prime Video on January 9, 2024.

== Reception ==
On the review aggregator website Rotten Tomatoes, 71% of 86 critics' reviews are positive, with an average rating of 6.3/10. The website's consensus reads: "Ambitious and unpredictable, Landscape with Invisible Hand struggles to get some of its ideas across, but remains a bold blend of sci-fi and social commentary." Metacritic, which uses a weighted average, assigned the film a score of 53 out of 100, based on 23 critics, indicating "mixed or average" reviews.
