= Let Me Be Frank With You =

2014 novel by Richard Ford

- Hardcover jacket, Ecco Press, 2014
- Author: Richard Ford
- Language: English
- Publisher: Ecco
- Publication date: November 4, 2014
- Publication place: United States
- Media type: Print (Hardcover)
- Pages: 256 p.
- ISBN: 9780061692062 (first edition)
- OCLC: 870564130
- Preceded by: Canada (novel)
- Followed by: Between Them: Remembering My Parents

Let Me Be Frank With You (2014) by Richard Ford, is the sequel to The Lay of the Land (2006) and the fourth in a series of five books of fiction that features protagonist and narrator Frank Bascombe.

== Background ==
Before the publication of Let Me Be Frank With You, Ford had written three novels with Frank Bascombe as the focal point. Ford referred to these three books as "The Bascombe Novels." The Lay of the Land (2006), the third novel about Frank Bascombe was –as Ford let it be known at the time of its publication– the last book in the series.

But in April 2013, Ford read from a new Frank Bascombe story without revealing to the audience if it was —or was not— part of a longer work. By 2014, though, it was confirmed that the story was to appear in the book Let Me Be Frank With You, to be published during November of that year.

As Richard Ford himself has written:

“The book in question, Let Me Be Frank With You, is not a Frank Bascombe novel, but four, longish Frank Bascombe stories, set in the fictive aftermath of Hurricane Sandy, the terrible storm that wrecked so much of life on the mid-Atlantic seaboard in the United States, in early autumn, 2012. Why I went back to Frank after I swore I wouldn’t has largely to do with circumstance, desuetude (mine) and forgetfulness – the reasons many of us do many important things.”

The sequel to Let Me Be Frank With You is the novel Be Mine, published in 2023.

== Synopsis ==
Let Me Be Frank With You is a work consisting of four interconnected novellas (or "long stories" as Ford prefers to call them) all narrated by Frank Bascombe: These four stories appear in the following sequence:

- I'm Here
- Everything Could Be Worse
- The New Normal
- Deaths of Others

By the time this book was published in 2014, readers were well-acquainted with Ford’s “signature character”, who first appeared in 1986’s The Sportswriter. Now thirty years later, Frank is 68 and married for a second time.

In an interview with Ford, Deborah Treisman clearly describes the trajectory of this fourth Bascombe book:

“Each of the four novellas in Let Me Be Frank with You revolves around a different event: in the first, Frank goes to see his former house, which has been demolished by Hurricane Sandy; in the second, he is visited by a former occupant of his current house who has a tragic story to tell; in the third, he goes to visit his ex-wife, Ann, who is suffering from Parkinson’s in an “extended-care facility”; in the final piece, he visits a dying old friend, who chooses to confess a past betrayal. In all four, Frank is forced to reflect on some element of the past.”

== Reception ==
Let Me Be Frank With You was a finalist for the 2015 Pulitzer Prize for Fiction. It did not win the prize, but the Pulitzer selection committee praised the book for its "unflinching series of narratives, set in the aftermath of Hurricane Sandy, insightfully portraying a society in decline."

Writing for The New York Times upon publication (November 2014), their reviewer Jonathan Miles pointed out that Let Me Be Frank With You continues “one of the more essential stories in contemporary American fiction: Frank Bascombe’s life and times,” although “structurally and tonally, it has less of the dense plenitude of its forebears, and for this and other reasons it feels like an outlier in the Bascombe canon.”

Booklist described Ford’s latest in the Bascombe series in glowing terms: “incisively frank, forensically observant, and covertly tender.”

In their review, BookBrowse first took note of the three previous novels in the series: “In his trio of world-acclaimed novels portraying the life of an entire American generation, Richard Ford has imagined one of the most indelible and widely discussed characters in modern literature, Frank Bascombe.” Then they described this new work, writing that:

“In four richly luminous narratives, Bascombe (and Ford) attempts to reconcile, interpret and console a world undone by calamity. It is a moving and wondrous and extremely funny odyssey through the America we live in at this moment […] Ford is here again working with the maturity and brilliance of a writer at the absolute height of his powers.”
