= Thoroughbreds (2017 film) =

2017 film by Cory Finley

- Theatrical release poster
- Directed by: Cory Finley
- Written by: Cory Finley
- Produced by: Andrew Duncan; Alex Saks; Kevin J. Walsh; Nat Faxon; Jim Rash
- Starring: Olivia Cooke; Anya Taylor-Joy; Anton Yelchin; Paul Sparks; Francie Swift
- Cinematography: Lyle Vincent
- Edited by: Louise Ford
- Music by: Erik Friedlander
- Production companies: June Pictures; B Story; Big Indie Pictures
- Distributed by: Focus Features
- Release dates: January 21, 2017 (Sundance); March 9, 2018 (United States)
- Running time: 92 minutes
- Country: United States
- Budget: $5 million
- Box office: $3.2 million

Thoroughbreds is a 2017 American black comedy thriller film written and directed by Cory Finley in his directorial debut. It follows high school student Lily (Anya Taylor-Joy) and her emotionless friend Amanda (Olivia Cooke) as they scheme to kill Lily's stepfather (Paul Sparks) via a contract with a drug dealer (Anton Yelchin).

Thoroughbreds was filmed in mid-2016. Two weeks after production wrapped, Yelchin died in an accident. The film premiered as Thoroughbred at the Sundance Film Festival on January 21, 2017. Over a year later, on March 9, 2018, it received a wide release by Focus Features. It is the last U.S. film to star Yelchin, and is dedicated to him.

The film received positive reviews from critics, who praised the ambitious direction, screenplay, and performances, particularly from Cooke and Taylor-Joy. It grossed $3 million against a $5 million production budget.

== Plot ==
In suburban Connecticut, upper-class high schooler Amanda euthanizes her crippled horse with a knife, resulting in charges of animal cruelty.

Sometime later, Amanda arrives at the home of the more popular and academically inclined Lily. The girls were previously best friends but grew apart after the death of Lily's father. They meet under the pretense of hanging out and having a casual tutoring session, but Amanda knows that her mother has paid Lily to socialize with Amanda. Lily denies being paid, but Amanda, who says that she does not experience emotions due to an unspecified mental disorder, is unfazed. Lily meets with Amanda again, this time voluntarily, and they rekindle their friendship.

Lily lives with her mother Cynthia and stepfather Mark, whom she hates. One night, Amanda asks if Lily has ever thought about killing Mark, upsetting Lily. However, tensions flare between Lily and Mark when Mark enrolls Lily in a boarding school for girls with behavioral issues. After seeing him berate Cynthia, Lily reconsiders and calls Amanda about the notion of killing him. She proposes that Amanda perform the murder as Amanda would not experience guilt. However, Amanda believes that her pending animal-cruelty trial would make her an immediate suspect. They decide instead to blackmail drug dealer Tim (who had previously been in jail for statutory rape) into murdering Mark while the two girls are out of town. On the night of the planned murder, Tim arrives at the property but leaves without killing Mark. The girls agree not to contact Tim again, as his own criminal history will prevent him from alerting the police. Lily impulsively prepares to kill Mark herself but is talked out of it by Amanda.

One night, Lily and Amanda are watching a film at Lily's home when Lily reveals she spiked Amanda's drink with Rohypnol so she could stab Mark to death and frame Amanda. Lily attempts to back out of the plan, but Amanda, realizing a life spent without emotions is "meaningless," willingly finishes her drink. While Amanda falls unconscious, Lily murders Mark and smears Amanda with his blood, crying and holding her for comfort.

Sometime later, Lily encounters Tim, who now works as a restaurant valet. Following Mark's death, Lily has once again found academic success and is interviewing for college admission. They talk about the murder (though Lily lies about what really happened), and Lily mentions having received a letter from Amanda, who has been committed to a psychiatric hospital for the crime. The letter is shown to detail Amanda's life at the hospital, including a recurring dream about a future in which humans let the world fall into disarray due to their vanity, leading to it being overrun by thoroughbred horses. Amanda smiles at a photo of her and Lily together, riding horses. When Tim asks what the letter said, Lily says she threw it away without reading it.

== Cast ==
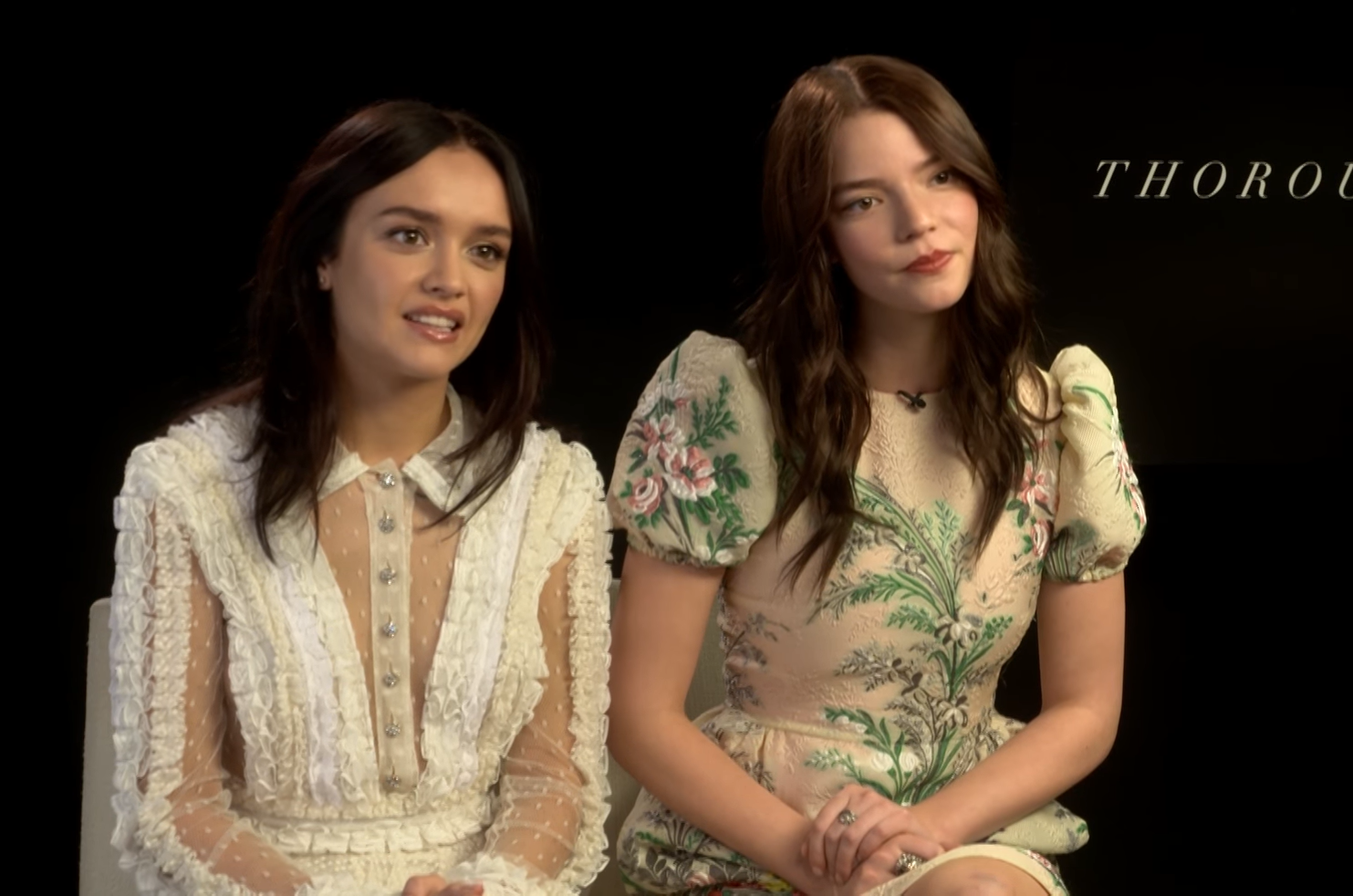
Olivia Cooke and Anya Taylor-Joy in an interview for Thoroughbreds

- Olivia Cooke as Amanda
- Anya Taylor-Joy as Lily Reynolds
- Anton Yelchin as Tim
- Paul Sparks as Mark, Lily's stepfather
- Francie Swift as Cynthia Reynolds, Lily's mother
- Kaili Vernoff as Karen, Amanda's mother

Additionally, Alex Wolff makes an uncredited appearance as a partygoer.

== Production ==
The script, which Finley had expected to be produced as a stage play, was instead acquired for production as a film by companies B Story (Nat Faxon, Jim Rash, and Kevin J. Walsh) and June Pictures.

In April 2016, Olivia Cooke, Anya Taylor-Joy and Anton Yelchin were announced to have joined the cast. Finley would direct the film.

=== Filming ===
Principal photography began on May 9, 2016, in the Massachusetts towns of Cohasset, Tewksbury, Scituate, Westwood, and Wellesley, concluding on June 5, 2016, 14 days before Yelchin died. Finley said of his experience with Yelchin: "The whole experience was really amazing. As soon as he came on board, we had a great dinner, where we talked about film noir as a genre. He was very keyed into that aspect of this movie, he loved film noir. I felt really, like I knew nothing about movies, talking to him. He was also the sweetest guy, he would never make you feel less-than for not knowing these things. He was just delightful and funny from the beginning, he was awesome throughout and brought a jolt of energy."

== Release ==
The film had its world premiere at the Sundance Film Festival on January 21, 2017, under the name Thoroughbred. Shortly after, Focus Features acquired distribution rights to the film, retitling it Thoroughbreds later in the year. It was released in the United States on March 9, 2018.

== Reception ==
On review aggregator website Rotten Tomatoes, the film holds an approval rating of 87% based on 167 reviews, with an average rating of 7.3/10. The website's critical consensus reads, "Thoroughbreds juggles genres with panache, delivering a well-written and refreshingly unpredictable entry in the teen thriller genre." On Metacritic, the film has a weighted average score of 75 out of 100, based on 37 critics, indicating "generally favorable reviews".
