= Richard Ford =

American author

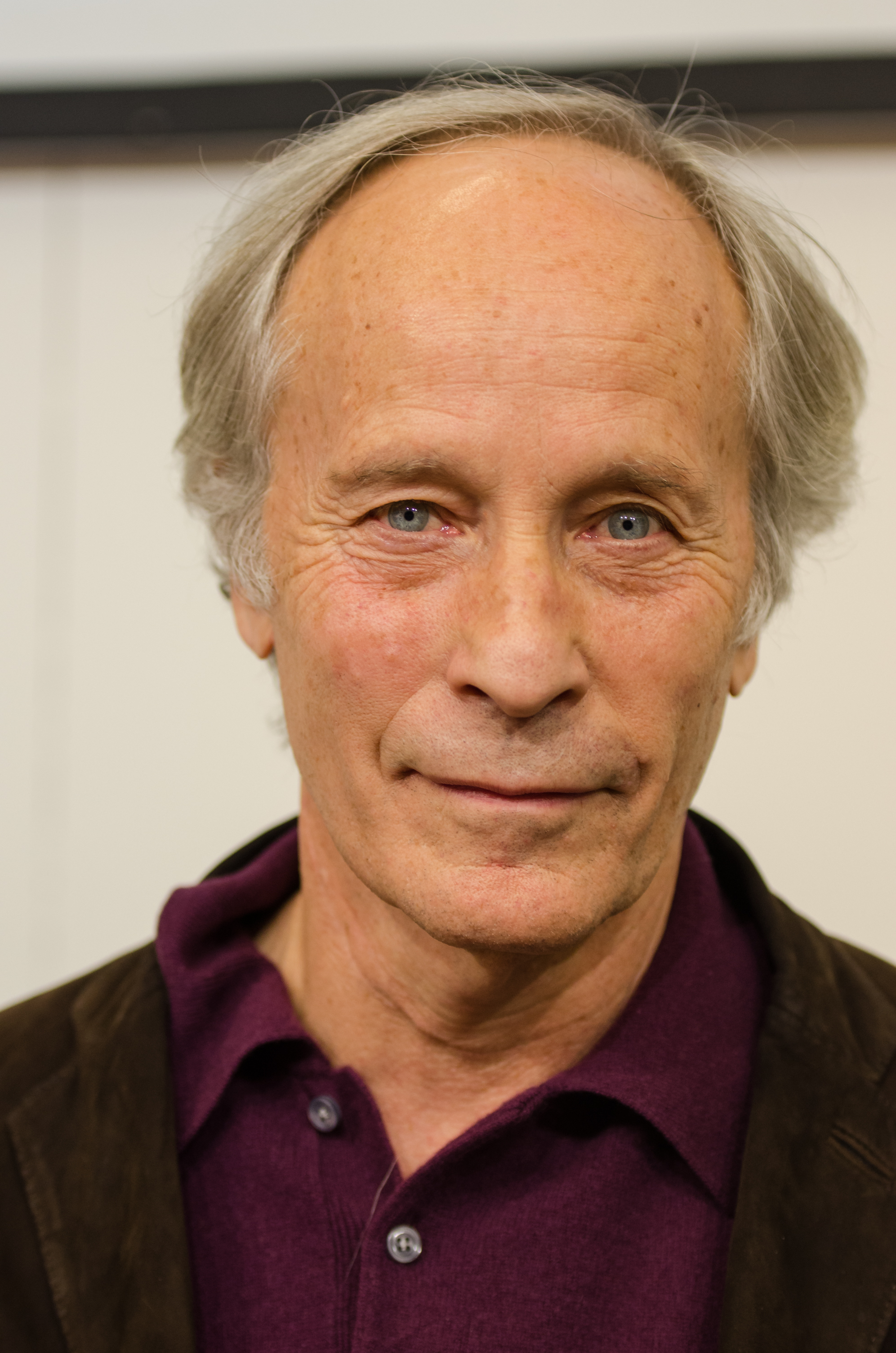
- Ford in 2013
- Born: February 16, 1944 (age 82); Jackson, Mississippi, U.S.
- Education: Michigan State University (BA); University of California, Irvine (MFA)
- Occupations: Novelist, short story writer
- Writing career
- Period: 1976–present
- Genre: Literary fiction
- Movements: Minimalism; Dirty realism

Richard Ford (born February 16, 1944) is an American novelist and short story author and writer of a series of novels featuring the character Frank Bascombe.

Ford's first collection of short stories, Rock Springs, was published in 1987.

In the United States, Ford received the 1996 Pulitzer Prize for his novel Independence Day. In Spain, he won the Princess of Asturias Award for 2016. In 2018, Ford received the Park Kyong-ni Prize, an international literary award from South Korea.

His novel Wildlife was adapted into a 2018 film of the same name, and in 2023 Ford published Be Mine, his fifth work of fiction chronicling the life of Frank Bascombe.

== Early life ==
Ford was born in Jackson, Mississippi, the only son of Parker Carrol and Edna Ford. Parker was a traveling salesman for Faultless Starch, a Kansas City company. Of his mother, Ford said, "Her ambition was to be, first, in love with my father and, second, to be a full-time mother." When Ford was eight years old, his father had a severe heart failure, and thereafter Ford spent as much time with his grandfather, a former prizefighter and hotel owner in Little Rock, Arkansas, as he did with his parents in Mississippi. Ford's father died of a second heart attack in 1960. In Jackson, Ford lived across the street from the home of author Eudora Welty.

Ford's grandfather had worked for a railroad. At the age of 19, before deciding to attend college, Ford began work on the Missouri Pacific train line as a locomotive engineer's assistant, learning the work while doing the job.

Ford received a B.A. degree from Michigan State University. Having enrolled to study hotel management, he switched to English. After graduating, he taught junior high school in Flint, Michigan, and enlisted in the United States Marine Corps but was discharged after contracting hepatitis. At university he met Kristina Hensley, his future wife and they married in 1968.

Despite mild dyslexia, Ford developed a serious interest in literature. He has stated in interviews that his dyslexia may have helped him as a reader since it forced him to read books slowly and thoughtfully.

Ford briefly attended law school but quit and participated with the creative writing program at the University of California, Irvine, to pursue a Master of Fine Arts degree, which he received in 1970. Ford chose this course simply because "they admitted me. I remember getting the application for Iowa and thinking they'd never have let me in. I'm sure I was right about that too. But typical of me, I didn't know who was teaching at Irvine. I didn't know it was important to know such things. I wasn't the most curious of young men, even though I give myself credit for not letting that deter me." Actually, Oakley Hall and E. L. Doctorow were teaching there and Ford has acknowledged they influenced him. In 1971, he was selected for a three-year appointment in the University of Michigan Society of Fellows.

== Early career ==
Ford published his first novel, A Piece of My Heart, the story of two unlikely drifters whose paths cross on an island in the Mississippi River, during 1976, and followed it with The Ultimate Good Luck during 1981. During the interim he briefly taught at Williams College and Princeton University. Despite good notices, the books sold little, and Ford retired from fiction writing to become a writer for the New York magazine Inside Sports. "I realized," Ford said, "there was probably a wide gulf between what I could do and what would succeed with readers. I felt that I'd had a chance to write two novels, and neither of them had really created much stir, so maybe I should find real employment, and earn my keep."

During 1982, the magazine was terminated, and when Sports Illustrated did not hire Ford, he resumed writing fiction, composing The Sportswriter, about a failed novelist turned sportswriter who undergoes an emotional crisis after the death of his son. It was named one of Time magazine's five best books of 1986 and was a finalist for the PEN/Faulkner Award for Fiction. Ford followed up that success with Rock Springs (1987), a story collection —set mostly in Montana —that includes what remain some of his most anthologized short stories. Ford adapted two stories from Rock Springs into the screenplay for the 1990 film Bright Angel. It was directed by Michael Fields and stars Dermot Mulroney, Lili Taylor and Sam Shepard.

== Mid-career and acclaim ==
Ford's 1990 novel Wildlife, a story of a Montana golf professional turned firefighter, met with mixed reviews and middling sales, but by the end of the 1990s Ford was increasingly sought after as an editor and contributor to various projects. Ford edited the 1990 The Best American Short Stories, the 1992 Granta Book of the American Short Story, the Fall 1996 "fiction issue" of Ploughshares, and the 1998 Granta Book of the American Long Story. In the latter volume's "Introduction," Ford stipulated that he preferred the designation "long story" instead of the term "novella." For the publishing project Library of America, Ford edited a two-volume edition of the selected works of the Mississippi writer Eudora Welty, which was published during 1998.

During 1995, Ford published the novel Independence Day, a sequel to The Sportswriter, featuring the continued story of its protagonist, Frank Bascombe. Reviews were positive, and the novel became the first to win both the PEN/Faulkner Award for Fiction and the Pulitzer Prize for Fiction. During the same year, Ford was chosen as winner of the Rea Award for the Short Story, for outstanding achievement for that genre. He ended the 1990s with a well-received collection of short stories, Women With Men, published during 1997. The Paris Review termed him a "master" of the short story genre.

== Later life and writings ==
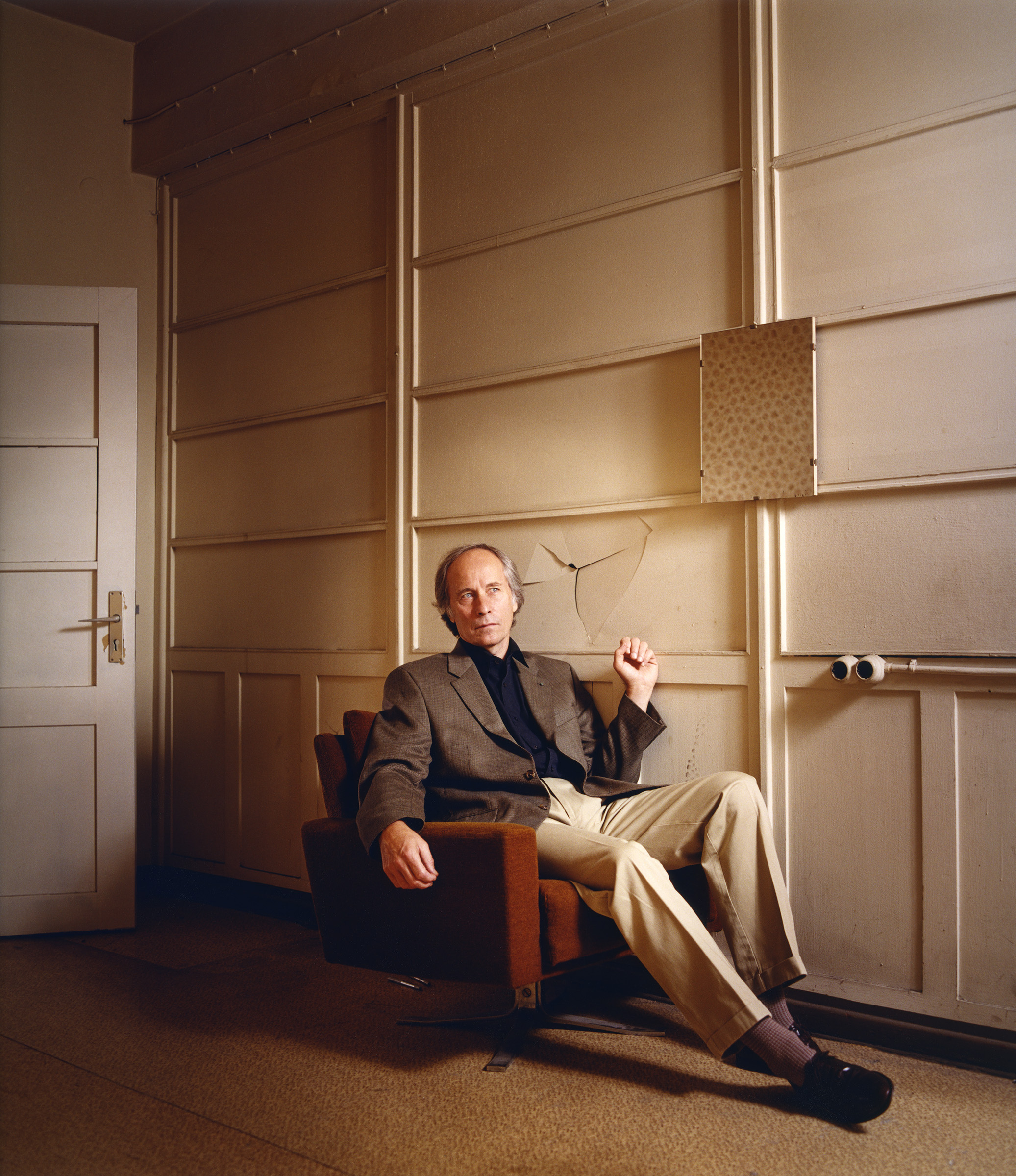
Richard Ford photographed by Oliver Mark, Berlin 2002

Ford lived for many years in New Orleans in the French Quarter, on lower Bourbon Street then in the Garden District of the same city, where his wife, Kristina, was the executive director of the city planning commission. For a while Ford and his wife resided in East Boothbay, Maine. As of 2023, Ford lives in Billings, Montana where he bought a house. During the intervening years, Ford lived in other locations, usually in the United States, as he pursued a peripatetic teaching career.

He obtained a teaching appointment at Bowdoin College during 2005 but kept the job for only one semester. During 2008 Ford was an adjunct professor of the Oscar Wilde Centre with the School of English at Trinity College Dublin, Ireland, teaching in the Masters programme in creative writing. Starting December 29, 2010, Ford assumed the job of senior fiction professor at the University of Mississippi during the autumn of 2011, replacing Barry Hannah, who died during March 2010. During the autumn of 2012, he became the Emmanuel Roman and Barrie Sardoff Roman Professor of the Humanities and Professor of Writing at the Columbia University School of the Arts.

As the new century commenced, he published another story collection, A Multitude of Sins (2002), followed by the novels The Lay Of The Land, —the third in his Bascombe series— in 2006 and Canada, published during May 2012. According to Ford, The Lay Of The Land completed his series of Bascombe novels but Canada was a stand-alone novel.

In April 2013, Ford read from a new Frank Bascombe story without revealing to the audience whether it was part of a longer work. By 2014, it was confirmed that the story was to appear in the book Let Me Be Frank With You, published during November of that year. The latter work consists of four interconnected novellas (or "long stories"), all narrated by Frank Bascombe. Let Me Be Frank With You was a finalist for the 2015 Pulitzer Prize in Fiction. It did not win the prize but the selection committee praised the book for its "unflinching series of narratives, set in the aftermath of Hurricane Sandy, insightfully portraying a society in decline."

As in the preceding decade, Ford continued to assist with various editing projects. During 2007, he edited the New Granta Book of the American Short Story and in 2011 he edited Blue Collar, White Collar, No Collar: Stories of Work. During May 2017, Ford published a memoir, Between Them: Remembering My Parents.

In 2018, Wildlife was adapted into a film of the same name by director Paul Dano and screenwriter Zoe Kazan. It was released to widespread critical acclaim.

In 2020, Ford's short story collection Sorry For Your Trouble was published. His novel Be Mine was published in June 2023 and is the fifth —and presumably final— book in Ford's so-called "Bascombe series."

== Reception ==
Ford began publishing his short stories in the 1980s, which corresponded with an American renaissance in the short story that centered around Raymond Carver (1938–1988). So there was a tendency early on to associate Ford's stories in Rock Springs with minimalism and its offshoot, an aesthetic style known as Dirty realism that referred to Carver's lower-middle-class subjects or the protagonists Ford portrays in Rock Springs. "Dirty realism" and "minimalism" came to be associated with a long list of writers during the 1970s and 1980s, including Tobias Wolff, Ann Beattie, Frederick Barthelme, Larry Brown, Jayne Anne Phillips, and Gordon Lish.

However, many of the characters in the novels about Frank Bascombe (The Sportswriter, Independence Day, The Lay of the Land, Let Me Be Frank With You, Be Mine), including the protagonist, enjoy degrees of material affluence and cultural capital not normally associated with dirty realism.

Ford's writing demonstrates "a meticulous concern for the nuances of language ... [and] the rhythms of phrases and sentences". He has described his sense of language as "a source of pleasure in itself—- all of its corporeal qualities, its syncopations, moods, sounds, the way things look on the page". Besides this "devotion to language" is what he terms "the fabric of affection that holds people close enough together to survive".

Comparisons have been drawn between Ford's work and the writings of John Updike, William Faulkner, Ernest Hemingway and Walker Percy. Ford resists such comparisons, commenting, "You can't write ... on the strength of influence. You can only write a good story or a good novel by yourself."

Ford's works of fiction "dramatize the breakdown of such cultural institutions as marriage, family, and community," and his "marginalized protagonists often typify the rootlessness and nameless longing ... pervasive in a highly mobile, present-oriented society in which individuals, having lost a sense of the past, relentlessly pursue their own elusive identities in the here and now." Ford "looks to art, rather than religion, to provide consolation and redemption in a chaotic time."

== Controversies ==
Ford once sent Alice Hoffman a copy of one of her books with bullet holes in it after she angered him by unfavorably reviewing The Sportswriter.

In 2004, Ford spat on Colson Whitehead when encountering him at a party two years after Whitehead published a negative review of A Multitude of Sins in The New York Times. Thirteen years later, Ford remained unrepentant. Writing in Esquire in 2017, Ford declared that "as of today, I don't feel any different about Mr. Whitehead, or his review or my response."

== Awards and honors ==
- 1987 Mississippi Institute of Arts and Letters Award in Fiction for The Sportswriter; again in 2007 for The Lay of the Land; and in 2013 for Canada
- 1995 Rea Award for the Short Story, for outstanding achievement in that genre
- 1996 PEN/Faulkner Award, for Independence Day
- 1996 Pulitzer Prize for Fiction, for Independence Day
- 2001 PEN/Malamud Award, for excellence in short fiction
- 2005 St. Louis Literary Award from the Saint Louis University Library Associates
- 2008 Kenyon Review Award for Literary Achievement
- 2012 Elected Fellow of the Royal Society of Literature
- 2013 Prix Femina étranger, for Canada
- 2013 Andrew Carnegie Medal for Excellence in Fiction, for Canada
- 2025 Prix Fitzgerald part of the F. Scott Fitzgerald Literary Festival
- 2015 Pulitzer Prize for Fiction, finalist, for Let Me Be Frank with You
- 2016 Princess of Asturias Award in Literature
- 2018 Park Kyong-ni Prize
- 2018 Siegfried Lenz Prize
- 2019 Library of Congress Prize for American Fiction

== Selected works ==
=== Novels ===
- A Piece of My Heart (1976)
- The Ultimate Good Luck (1981)
- The Sportswriter (1986)
- Wildlife (1990)
- Independence Day (1995)
- The Lay of the Land (2006)
- Canada (2012)
- Let Me Be Frank With You (2014)
- Be Mine (2023)

=== Story collections ===
- Rock Springs (1987)
- Women with Men: Three Stories (1997)
- A Multitude of Sins (2002)
- Vintage Ford (2004)
- Sorry for Your Trouble: Stories (2020)

=== Memoir ===
- Between Them: Remembering My Parents (2017)

=== Screenplays ===
- Bright Angel (1990)

=== As contributor or editor ===
- The Granta Book of the American Short Story (1992)
- The Granta Book of the American Long Story (1999)
- The Essential Tales of Chekhov (1999)
- Foreword to Alec Soth, NIAGARA (Göttingen, Germany: Steidl, 2006)
- The New Granta Book of the American Short Story (2007)
- Blue Collar, White Collar, No Collar: Stories of Work (2012)
- Foreword to Maude Schuyler Clay, Mississippi History (Göttingen, Germany: Steidl, 2015)
