= Be Mine (novel) =

2023 book by Richard Ford

- Hardcover, Bloomsbury Pub., (Great Britain)
- Author: Richard Ford
- Published: 2023
- Publisher: Bloomsbury Publishing
- Publication date: 22 June 2023
- Publication place: United States
- Media type: Hardcover
- Pages: 352
- ISBN: 9781526661760

Be Mine is a novel by Richard Ford published in 2023. It is Ford's fifth book to feature Frank Bascombe as the narrator and protagonist.

== Description ==
Be Mine is the follow up to the fourth book in the Bascombe cycle: Let Me Be Frank With You (2014). Be Mine centres around Frank Bascombe tending to the needs of his son, Paul, who has a deadly motor neurone disease. The novel, which is presumably the final Bascombe book, "explores happiness and denial, completing a social history of Ford's own boomer generation from midlife to end times."

== Plot ==
Be Mine begins in February 2020 with Frank aged seventy-four and temporarily living in Rochester, Minnesota while caring for his forty-seven-year-old son Paul, who is a patient at the Mayo Clinic for amyotrophic lateral sclerosis. Frank has recently scattered the ashes of his first wife (and Paul's mother) Ann, and been left by his second wife Sally. Frank is troubled by his son's impending death and also by his own mortality, having recently experienced an episode of global amnesia, but feels he has stoically embraced his new role as Paul's carer. Frank has a distant relationship with his daughter Clarissa, their only other surviving family member, and has fallen in unrequited love with a young massage therapist.

The novel revolves around a Valentine's Day roadtrip Frank attempts to organise to Mount Rushmore in an RV. Paul's disinterest continually disheartens Frank and threatens to derail their journey, but they are eventually successful in reaching the mountain and Paul ultimately considers their trip to have been worthwhile.

In an epilogue, Frank reveals that Paul died of COVID-19 in September 2020. Frank is now living in a platonic relationship in California with Catherine Flaherty, an old acquaintance who first appeared as an intern in The Sportswriter. At the conclusion of the novel, staring out across the Pacific Ocean, Frank experiences his second bout of global amnesia. The novel ends as he turns with eager anticipation to respond to an unknown person calling his name.

== Reception ==
The first reviews and appraisals following its publication in June 2023, seemed to give the novel an appreciative but mixed reception. Writing for The Age, reviewer Peter Craven said "it's hard to see a better novel being published this year", saying of it:

Be Mine is a book of scintillating panache. There is a wizardry in the way Ford captures the patient humorous tone of Bascombe and the patent distress often repressed by wacko attempts at sly wit on the part of his son. It’s a novel about the tears in things that operates through a logic of distraction."

Dwight Garner of the New York Times was less effusive in his praise. He criticised the book saying: Be Mine isn't shoddy, exactly, but it's the thinnest and least persuasive of the Bascombe novels. The seams in these books have begun to show."

Mark Athitakis of the Los Angeles Times wrote: "This wishy-washiness is Frank’s problem, but also the novel’s. Be Mine lacks the forward thrust of the first two Bascombe novels — both classics, however gassy. And it's all the more frustrating because there are moments throughout the book where Frank's status as a world-class observer is fully, delightfully intact."

Sam Sacks in The Wall Street Journal wrote:

"Mr. Ford's tendency to write in chin-stroking proverbs has brought him critics. . . but what's important is less the truth of these utterances than the extent to which Frank relies on them. In Mr. Ford's hands, clichés become koans, simultaneously resonant and hollow depending on one's fortunes at the time, and to Frank they double as sound, practical counsel and bitter jokes."
