= Canada (novel) =

2012 novel by Richard Ford

- First edition (Canadian)
- Author: Richard Ford
- Language: English
- Publisher: Ecco Press
- Publication date: June 2012
- Publication place: United States
- ISBN: 1-4434-1111-6
- OCLC: 795760401
- Preceded by: The Lay of the Land
- Followed by: Let Me Be Frank With You

Canada is a 2012 novel by American author Richard Ford. The novel follows 15-year-old Dell Parsons, who must learn to fend for himself after his parents are arrested for robbing a bank. The book also re-visits Great Falls, Montana, a setting that Ford frequently uses in his work. It was Ford's first "stand alone" novel since Wildlife (1990).

== Plot ==
After his parents are arrested for robbing a bank, fifteen-year-old Dell Parsons is left to fend for himself. His twin sister Berner has run off, leaving him to a family friend who secrets him away to Saskatchewan, Canada. There Dell is to live with the American Arthur Remlinger, a man with a cool demeanor and a hidden inner violence that threatens Dell's well-being.

== Development ==
The work on Canada took Ford twenty years, with the author stating that he took inspiration from several different sources. Ford stated that some of the elements in the book, such as the feeling of "not [being] connected with the larger forces of a culture I was by accident born into", were drawn from his personal experiences. He also expressed an interest in the aftermath and consequences of crimes such as murder and robberies, and the effect they have on the young family members of the perpetrators, as well as the "closeness to which normal life bears upon felonious life".

== Reception ==
Critical reception for Canada has been overwhelmingly positive, with The New Yorker comparing the book to William Maxwell's So Long, See You Tomorrow and Ford's previous novel Wildlife. The latter book also used Montana as a setting and, like Canada ,was a "stand alone" novel (i.e., not featuring Frank Bascombe as a protagonist).

Praise for the novel centered on the book's narration, which is told from the viewpoint of an older Dell, and the book's clarity and simplicity. The Daily Telegraph cited Ford's "genius at capturing human frailty and its pitiful disguises" as a highlight while The Washington Post praised the book's "plainspoken lines".

The novel received the American Library Association's 2013 Andrew Carnegie Medal for Excellence in Fiction.
