= Cory Finley =

American director and screenwriter

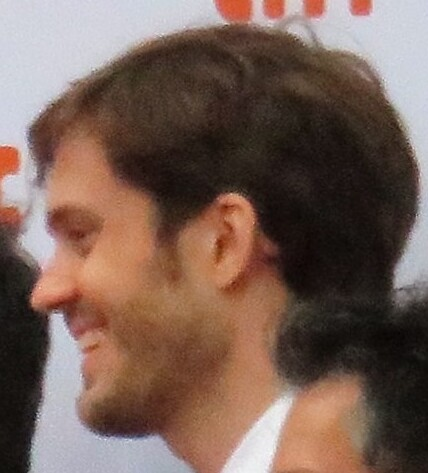
- Finley in 2019
- Born: St. Louis, Missouri, U.S.
- Occupations: Director, screenwriter
- Years active: 2017–present

Cory Finley is an American film director and screenwriter. He wrote and directed the black comedy film Thoroughbreds, which premiered at Sundance Film Festival in 2017. He also directed the true crime dramedy film Bad Education starring Hugh Jackman and Allison Janney, which premiered on HBO and won the Primetime Emmy Award for Outstanding Television Movie in 2020.

Finley was raised in St. Louis where he attended Glenridge Elementary School in Clayton and later John Burroughs School, where his mother was a teacher and administrator. He attended Yale College. He has an older sister, Lynn and younger brother, Thom. His mother, Macon Finley, is currently the Head of The Ellis School in Pittsburgh. His father is Peter Finley.

== Filmography ==
=== Film ===
Year	Title	Director	Writer
2017	Thoroughbreds	Yes	Yes
2019	Bad Education	Yes	No
2023	Landscape with Invisible Hand	Yes	Yes

=== Television ===
Year	Title	Director	Writer	Notes
2022	WeCrashed	Yes	No	Episodes "4.4" and "Hustle Harder"
2026	Furious	Yes	No	Episodes "Some Days It Don't Come Easy" and "Hart Island"
TBA	A Cool Breeze on the Underground	Yes	Yes	
