= Vic Sarin =

Canadian filmmaker (born 1941)

Vic Sarin CM
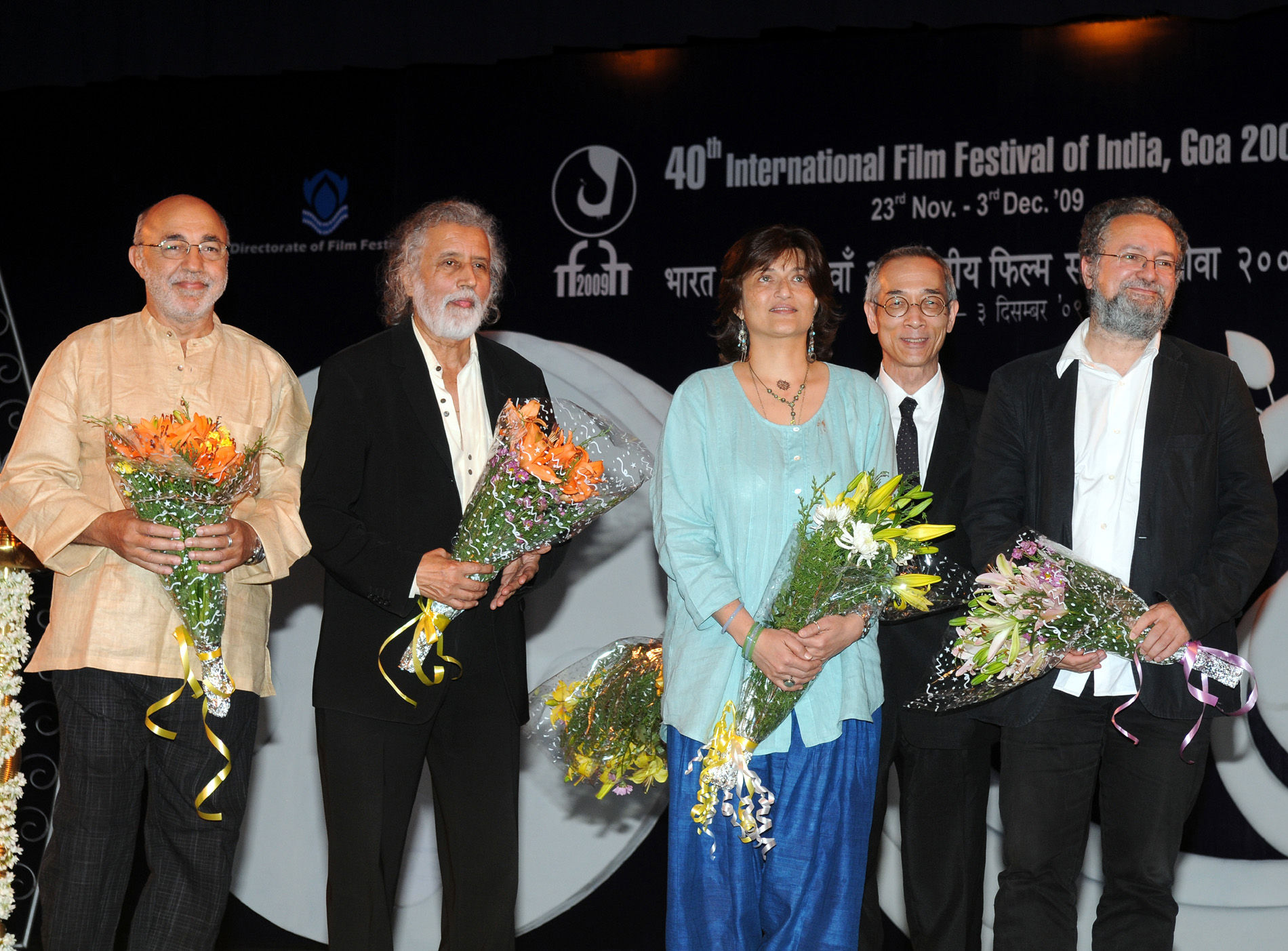
- Vic Sarin, IFFI (2009)
- Born: 1941 (age 84–85); India
- Occupations: Director; cinematographer; screenwriter
- Years active: 1961-present
- Awards: List

Victor Sarin CM (born 1941) is an Indian-born Canadian/American film director, cinematographer and screenwriter who has worked in film and television for over 60 years. Sarin was the recipient of the Canadian Society of Cinematographers Kodak New Century Award in 2009, the Directors Guild of Canada Lifetime Achievement Award in 2018 and the Order of Canada in 2022.

Sarin has worked on over 100 feature films, documentaries and television specials across multiple genres. Sarin has nominated for and won Emmys, Genies, Geminis and Canadian Screen Awards. Sarin's films have screened at film festivals including TIFF, Cannes, Berlin, Tribeca, London, Shanghai, San Sebastian, Sydney, and Goa.

His work as a cinematographer includes Partition, Margaret's Museum, Whale Music, Heartaches, and Dancing in the Dark. He also directed Partition, A Shine of Rainbows, Left Behind, and The Lightkeeper.

== Early life ==
Born in Occupied Kashmir, India, Sarin experimented with his family's 8 mm movie camera and watched Indian films as a child. Sarin's father worked for India's Ministry of External Affairs as a diplomat to Australia. Sarin joined them in Canberra before moving to Melbourne. He took a two-year Broadcast Operator's program at the Royal Technical College. On his 17th birthday, his father bought him a 16 mm Bolex camera.

== Career ==
=== ABC Television ===
After graduating from The Royal Technical College in 1961, Sarin was hired by the Australian Broadcast Corporation as a technician's assistant and freelanced as a film cameraman for ABC News. Due to his father's diplomatic post ending and Australia's racial immigration policy, Sarin had to leave Australia and chose to move to Canada in 1963.

=== CBC Television ===
Shortly after arriving in Canada, Vic was hired by CBC Toronto as a studio cameraman, working on programs such as The National, This Hour Has Seven Days, The Friendly Giant, Front Page Challenge, Take Thirty, News Magazine, Razzle Dazzle, Mr. Dressup, The Nature of Things, Front Page Challenge, Juliette and others.

In 1968, Sarin joined the film department of CBC Television. Over the next 18 years, Sarin worked as a cinematographer for many primetime CBC documentaries and dramas. Sarin was the first staff cinematographer for the CBC's long-running primetime investigative documentary program The Fifth Estate in 1976 as well as the first cinematographer on the landmark anthology drama series For The Record in the same year.

Sarin worked as the cinematographer for many award-winning CBC Television movies and miniseries such as Riel, The Wordsmith, War Brides, Chautauqua Girl, Charlie Grant's War, Crossbar and Love and Larceny. In 1980, Sarin's directorial debut began with the acclaimed three-part miniseries You've Come a Long Way Katie starring Lally Cadeau and Catherine O'Hara. He then directed CBC movies The Other Kingdom, Passengers, Island Love Song and Family Reunion. While working for the CBC, Sarin also shot his first feature Heartaches as the cinematographer in 1981 which was nominated for eleven Genie Awards, winning three.

=== After CBC ===
Sarin left the CBC in 1987 to pursue a career as an independent filmmaker. In 1989, His first feature film as a director was Cold Comfort, a dramatic thriller about three people stranded at deserted gas station in a blizzard starring Paul Gross, Maury Chaykin and Jayne Eastwood. It was nominated for five Genie awards including Best Picture and won Best Adapted screenplay.

In 1991, Sarin directed and shot the ten part documentary series Millennium: Tribal Wisdom and the Modern World which celebrates the lives and worldviews of small scale non-technological societies as the last of them face their inevitable accommodation with the 'modern world'. The Millennium series premiered in February 1992 on The Global Television Network. It was broadcast nationally on PBS in May 1992 and later on BBC Television. The series was subsequently broadcast in numerous other countries over the following years with global viewership approaching 100 million. Millennium earned him an Emmy Award for Outstanding Individual Achievement in Cinematography.

Sarin directed Trial at Fortitude Bay starring Henry Czerny in 1994 which received two Gemini nominations. In 1995, he was the cinematographer for the period drama film Margaret's Museum starring Helena Botham Carter and Clive Russell, earning another Genie nomination for Best Cinematography. In 1996, Sarin directed The Legend of Gatorface in 1996 which was nominated for a Daytime Emmy Award for Paul Winfield for Outstanding Performer in a Children's Special. In 1997, he directed In His Father’s Shoes, being nominated for five Daytime Emmy Awards, winning two. Sarin directed and shot Sea People in 1999, earning Four Daytime Emmy nominations.

In 2001, Sarin directed the Christian apocalyptic thriller film Left Behind in 2001 starring Kirk Cameron. Shot primarily in and around Toronto, Ontario, Canada, the film cost $17.4 million (equivalent to $28,653,459 in 2023). At the time of its release, the film was promoted by its creators as the "biggest and most ambitious Christian film ever made."

=== Sepia Films ===
In 2003, Sarin founded the multi-platform film and television production company Sepia Films with partners Tina Pehme and Kim Roberts. Based in Vancouver, British Columbia and Los Angeles, Sepia specializes in international co-productions and has produced and shot films in Canada, U.S., Ireland, England, Italy, Denmark, India, China, South Africa, Tanzania, Argentina, Australia and Brazil.

Sarin wrote, directed and shot Partition in 2007, an epic period romantic drama film starring Jimi Mistry, Irrfan Khan and Kristin Kreuk. A co-production between Canada, South Africa and the United Kingdom, it takes place in India during the 1947 Partition of India and Pakistan and follows a Sikh ex-soldier who offers shelter to a young Muslim woman separated from her family. The film was shot primarily in Kamloops, British Columbia Canada and Punjab, India. The film received one Genie Award nomination for the Best Achievement in Cinematography.

In 2009, Sarin wrote, directed and shot A Shine of Rainbows in County Donegal, Ireland. Starring Connie Neilson, Aiden Quinn, John Bell and Jack Gleeson, it is an adaptation of the novel A Shine of Rainbows by English writer Lillian Beckwith. Debuting at TIFF, It was nominated for and won several awards.

Sarin returned to documentary work in 2011 by directing Desert Riders about the trafficking, slavery and sexual abuse of young boys from Bangladesh, Pakistan, Mauritania and other countries to work as camel jockeys in the UAE under excruciating conditions and the global effort to stop it. Sarin was a 2012 Director's Guild of Canada nominee for the Allen King Award for Excellence in a Documentary.

From 2013 to 2018, Sarin directed and shot The Nightmare Series which included A Sister’s Nightmare (2013), A Daughters Nightmare (2014), A Wife's Nightmare (2014), A Surrogates Nightmare (2017) and A Father's Nightmare (2018) for the Lifetime Network.

Sarin directed Hue: a Matter of Colour in 2013 which channelled a personal, heartfelt investigation into the history and often tragic effects of colourism. It was a co-production between Sepia Films, The National Film Board of Canada and Documentary Channel. In 2014, Sarin directed The Boy From Geita which followed Adam, a young Tanzanian boy persecuted because of his albinism. The film was nominated for several awards, including three from VIFF and the 2015 Directors Guild of Canada Allan King Award For Excellence in Documentary. In 2015, Sarin directed Keepers of the Magic which “honours the great masters of cinematography, unsung heroes whose vision and talent was always right before our eyes” and conducted interviews with fellow filmmakers like Roger Deakins, Vittorio Storaro, Gordon Willis and Sam Mendes.

In 2022, Sarin co-wrote, shot and directed the dramatic thriller Sugar for Amazon Prime Video starring Katherine McNamara and Jasmine Sky. The true story chronicled two Canadian influencers on a cruise around the world who naively get involved in illegal activities for a cartel.

In 2017, Vic wrote a published autobiography about his life called Eyepiece: Adventures in Canadian Film and Television. With a foreword by The Right Honourable Adrienne Clarkson, Eyepiece chronicles Vic's childhood in India and Australia, working for the CBC in Canada to transitioning to an independent filmmaker.

Sarin's latest film is an Irish period romantic drama called The Lightkeeper starring Dominac Cooper, Sarah Gadon, Aiden Quinn and Sarah Bolger. Filming began in September, 2023.

== Filmography ==
=== Feature film ===
Year	Title	Director	DoP	Writer	Notes
1981	Heartaches	No	Yes	No	
1986	Loyalties	No	Yes	No	
1986	Bye Bye Blues	No	Yes	No	
1986	Dancing in the Dark	No	Yes	No	
1987	Nowhere to Hide	No	Yes	No	
1988	A Switch in Time	No	Yes	No	aka Norman's Awesome Experience
1989	Namumkin	No	Yes	No	
1989	Cold Comfort	Yes	Yes	No	
1989	The Long Road Home	No	Yes	No	
1990	Divided Loyalites	No	Yes	No	
1991	On My Own	No	Yes	No	
1993	Cold Sweat	No	Yes	No	
1993	The Burning Season	No	Yes	No	
1994	Whale Music	No	Yes	No	
1995	Urban Safari	No	Yes	No	
1996	Salt Water Moose	No	Yes	No	
2000	Left Behind: The Movie	Yes	Yes	No	
2004	Love on the Side	Yes	Yes	No	Also executive producer
2007	Partition	Yes	Yes	Yes	
2009	A Shine of Rainbows	Yes	Yes	Yes	
2022	Sugar	Yes	Yes	Yes	
TBA	The Lightkeeper	Yes	Yes	Yes	

Documentary cinematographer

- The Naked Peacock (1975)
- Mountain Gorillia (1992)
- The Hidden Dimension (1997)

=== Television ===
Year	Title	Director	DoP	Notes
1963–1971	Telescope	No	Yes	16 episodes
1976	The Rimshots	No	Yes	Pilot
1976–1979	The Fifth Estate	No	Yes	3 seasons
1976–1977	For the Record	No	Yes	8 episodes
1981	Seeing Things	No	Yes	1 episode
1984	The Edison Twins	No	Yes	2 episodes
1988	Alfred Hitchcock Presents	Yes	Yes	Directed 1 episode
1988	T. and T.	Yes	No	1 episode
1994–1995	Spenser	Yes	Yes	Directed 1 episode
1997	Wind at My Back	Yes	No	1 episode
2000	Hope Island	Yes	No	1 episode
2001	Starhunter	No	Yes	2 episodes
2002	Flatland	Yes	Yes	Directed 4 episodes

==== TV movies ====
Year	Title	Director	DoP
1977	Someday Soon	No	Yes
1977	The Fighting Man	No	Yes
1979	Crossbar	No	Yes
1979	The Wordsmith	No	Yes
1979	Fighting Back	No	Yes
1980	War Brides	No	Yes
1981	A Far Cry from Home	No	Yes
1982	Passengers	Yes	Yes
1983	Rumours of Glory	No	Yes
1984	Chautauqua Girl	No	Yes
1984	The Accident	No	Yes
1985	Charlie Grant's War	No	Yes
1985	Love and Larceny	No	Yes
1986	Turning to Stone	No	Yes
1986	Dave Thomas: The Incredible Time Travels of Henry Osgood	No	Yes
1986	The Last Season	No	Yes
1987	Island Love Song	Yes	Yes
1988	Family Reunion	Yes	Yes
1989	Love and Hate: The Story of Colin and JoAnn Thatcher	No	Yes
1989	A Moving Picture	No	Yes
1994	Trial at Fortitude Bay	Yes	Yes
1995	Wounded Heart	Yes	Yes
1996	Hearts Adrift	Yes	Yes
1996	The Legend of Gator Face	Yes	No
1997	Artemesia	No	Yes
1997	In His Father's Shoes	Yes	No
1998	Hard to Forget	Yes	Yes
1998	The Waiting Game	Yes	Yes
1999	Sea People	Yes	Yes
2002	Recipe for Murder	Yes	Yes
2005	Murder Unveiled	Yes	No
2013	A Sister's Nightmare	Yes	Yes
2014	A Daughter's Nightmare	Yes	Yes
2014	A Wife's Nightmare	Yes	Yes
2016	Summer in the City	Yes	Yes
2017	A Surrogate's Nightmare	Yes	Yes
2017	Drink Slay Love	No	Uncredited
2018	A Father's Nightmare	Yes	Yes
2021	Kidnapped	Yes	Yes

Miniseries

Year	Title	Director	DoP
1979	Riel	No	Yes
1981	You've Come a Long Way, Katie	Yes	Yes
1984	The Other Kingdom	Yes	Yes

Documentary film

Year	Title	Director	DoP	Writer
1981	Bix: 'Ain't None of Them Play Like Him Yet'	No	Yes	No
1982	Hugh MacLennan: Portrait of a Writer	No	Yes	No
2013	Hue: A Matter of Colour	Yes	Yes	Yes
2016	Keepers of the Magic	Yes	Yes	Yes

==== Documentary series ====
Year	Title	Director	DoP	Writer	Notes
1964	Endless Cycles	Yes	Yes	No	
1965	Dig those Diggers	Yes	Yes	No	
1974	People of Our Times	No	Yes	No	
1974	Elements of Survival	No	Yes	No	
1979	Taking Chances	No	Yes	No	
1983	Gurkhas of Nepal	Yes	Yes	Yes	
1989	Solitary Journey	Yes	Yes	No	
1992	Millennium: Tribal Wisdom and the Modern World	Yes	Yes	No	
1992	The David Milgaard Story	Yes	Yes	No	Also producer
1993	God's Dominion: Shepherds to the Flock	No	Yes	No	
2011	Desert Riders	Yes	Yes	No	
2014	The Boy from Geita	Yes	Yes	Yes	

== Awards and accolades ==
- 2022 Order of Canada "for his long-standing contributions to the Canadian film and television industries as a renowned director, cinematographer and screenwriter."
- 2008 Genie Award for Best Achievement in Cinematography - Partition - Nominee
- 2007 Leo Award for Best Cinematography in a Feature Length Drama - Partition - Nominated
- 2007 Leo Award for Best Direction in a Feature Length Drama - Partition - Nominated
- 2007 Leo Award for Best Screenwriting in a Feature Length Drama - Partition - Nominated (with Patricia Finn)
- 2006 Leo Award for Best Direction in a Feature Length Drama - Murder Unveiled - Nominated
- 2001 DVD Exclusive Awards Video Premiere Award for Best Directing - Left Behind: The Movie - Nominated
- 2000 Daytime Emmy Award for Outstanding Directing in a Children's Special - Sea People - Nominated
- 1998 Daytime Emmy Award for Outstanding Directing in a Children's Special - In His Father's Shoes - Nominated
- 1996 Genie Award for Best Achievement in Cinematography - Margaret's Museum - Nominated
- 1993 Australian Film Institute AFI Award for Best Achievement in Cinematography - On My Own - Nominated
- 1992 Emmy Award for Outstanding Individual Achievement - Informational Programming - Cinematography - Millennium: Tribal Wisdom and the Modern World episode Strange Relations - Won (shared with Michael Boland)
- 1990 Gemini Award for Best Photography in a Dramatic Program or Series - Love and Hate: The Story of Colin and JoAnn Thatcher - Won
- 1990 Gemini Award for Best Photography in a Dramatic Program or Series - Divided Loyalties - Nominated
- 1988 Gemini Award for Best Direction in a Dramatic Program or Mini-Series - Family Reunion - Nominated
- 1988 Gemini Award for Best Photography in a Comedy, Variety or Performing Arts Program or Series - Family Reunion - Nominated
- 1987 Gemini Award for Best Photography in a Dramatic Program or Series - The Last Season - Nominated
- 1986 Gemini Award for Best Photography in a Dramatic Program or Series - The Suicide Murders - Nominated
- 1982 Genie Award for Best Achievement in Cinematography - Heartaches - Nominated
