= A Wife's Nightmare =

2014 television film directed by Vic Sarin

- Official release poster
- Genre: Drama, Mystery, Thriller
- Written by: Dan Trota; Blake Corbet
- Directed by: Vic Sarin; Vijay Sarin
- Starring: Jennifer Beals; Dylan Neal; Lola Tash; Spencer List
- Country of origin: United States
- Original language: English

Production
- Producers: John Bolton; Larry Gershman; Tina Pehme; Kim Roberts; Meyer Shwarzstein; Ian R. Smith
- Cinematography: Vic Sarin; Vijay Sarin
- Running time: 87 minutes
- Production company: Sepia Films

Original release
- Network: Lifetime
- Release: December 27, 2014

A Wife's Nightmare is a 2014 American mystery-thriller film directed by Vic Sarin and Vijay Sarin and written by Dan Tronta and Blake Corbet. The film stars Jennifer Beals, Dylan Neal, Spencer List and Lola Tash. The movie was released in the United States on December 27, 2014 on Lifetime network.

== Synopsis ==
Liz has returned home after staying at a mental hospital due to nervous breakdown where she is greeted by her family. Her life has turned upside down when she encounters Caitlin, a young woman who claims to be her husband's daughter.

== Cast ==
- Jennifer Beals as Liz
- Dylan Neal as Gabe
- Lola Tash as Caitlin
- Spencer List as AJ
- Katherine McNamara as Jackie
- Alex Ferris as Sean
- Nicole Hombrebueno as Allison
- Tracie Hway as Angie

== Production ==
The story of this film takes place in the fictional town of "Ridgewood"; Ridgewood was also the setting of the Lifetime movies A Mother's Nightmare and A Daughter's Nightmare.
