= Paseo (film) =

- Directed by: Matthew Hannam
- Written by: Matthew Hannam; Sarah Gadon
- Produced by: Fraser Ash; Sarah Gadon; Kevin Krikst
- Starring: Sarah Gadon; Peter Mooney
- Cinematography: Nicolas Bolduc
- Edited by: Matthew Hannam; Duff Smith
- Music by: Danny Bensi; Saunder Jurriaans
- Distributed by: Crave
- Release date: September 6, 2018 (TIFF)
- Running time: 14 minutes
- Country: Canada
- Language: English

Paseo is a Canadian short drama film, directed by Matthew Hannam and released in 2018. The film stars Sarah Gadon as Alice, a woman who is exploring the city of Barcelona as she copes with feelings of loneliness and isolation.

The film was awarded a production grant from BravoFACT in 2015, and was inspired in part by the time that Hannam and Gadon spent in Barcelona while working on Denis Villeneuve's film Enemy. Its cast also includes Peter Mooney and Alejandro Alvarez Cadilla.

The film premiered at the 2018 Toronto International Film Festival. It was subsequently named to TIFF's year-end Canada's Top Ten list for short films in 2018.
