= High ground (disambiguation) =

High ground is a spot of elevated terrain which can be advantageous in military tactics.

High ground may also refer to:

- Moral high ground, an ethical analogy
- High Ground (2012 film), a documentary film directed by Mike Brown
- High Ground (2020 film), an Australian film directed by Stephen Maxwell Johnson
- High Ground (2025 film), an American action thriller
- The High Ground (Star Trek: The Next Generation), an episode of Star Trek: The Next Generation
- "High Ground", a map on the Xbox 360 game Halo 3
- "High Ground", a short story by John McGahern
- "The High Ground", a science fiction book, written by Melinda Snodgrass
- The Highground Veterans Memorial Park west of Neillsville, Wisconsin
- High Ground, a 1975 album by David Essig.
