= Partition (2007 film) =

- Poster for Partition
- Directed by: Vic Sarin
- Written by: Patricia Finn; Vic Sarin
- Produced by: Tina Pehme; Kim Roberts
- Starring: Jimi Mistry; Kristin Kreuk; Neve Campbell; Irrfan Khan; John Light
- Cinematography: Vic Sarin
- Edited by: Reginald Harkema
- Music by: Brian Tyler
- Release date: 2 February 2007
- Countries: Canada; South Africa; United Kingdom
- Language: English
- Budget: $10 million

Partition is a 2007 English-language period film directed by Vic Sarin, written by Patricia Finn and Vic Sarin, and starring Jimi Mistry, Irrfan Khan and Kristin Kreuk. The film is set in 1947, based on the Partition of India and was partially shot in Kamloops, British Columbia, Canada.

== Plot ==
Gian Singh is a Sikh who goes off to war in the British Indian Army with his two best friends Andrew and Avtar. The three are being seen off by Andrew's sister Margaret and Walter. Gian promises to look after Andrew only to resign after Andrew is killed. Gian is tortured by the guilt of not being able to save Andrew. The young Muslim woman Naseem (Kristin Kreuk) is separated from her family in riots and unaware that her father has been killed, hides in hope that the Sikh mobs won't find her.

Gian finds Naseem in the woods, having just returned to his home town near the Pakistani border. Their efforts to hide are foiled; Naseem and Gian are forced to bargain for Naseem's life with money. The townspeople, although initially resenting her presence, begin to accept Naseem, and it seems that the bad parts of their lives have faded away until night when both Naseem and Gian suffer from tortured visions of their past. These visions ultimately unite the two and they get married and have a son they call Vijay.

In love, the world seems perfect until Margaret shows up on Gian's doorstep with news that Naseem's family has been found in Pakistan. Naseem leaves to see them in Pakistan. She is to return in a month but does not arrive. Her two brothers, discovering her marriage to a Sikh, lock her up in her room and forbid her to ever return to India. Akbar, the eldest, is particularly stubborn, and vows to keep her away from her husband at all costs. Gian, tired of waiting, sets off on a trip to Pakistan to retrieve Naseem. He disguises himself as a Muslim, cutting off his hair and donning a Kofi. Even with the disguise he has to sneak across the border as his papers are not sufficient.

Gian meets with Walter and Margaret, who barely recognise him without his turban, and leaves Vijay with them while he goes to get Naseem. When he arrives, still dressed as a Muslim, Naseem immediately recognizes him. As they run toward one another they are stopped by her brothers and Akbar beats Gian. To explain himself to his neighbors he tells them that Gian is a Sikh. Meanwhile, Naseem has been locked up by her brother Zakir. Gian is hauled to jail and there he wallows in the darkness, refusing to return to India until he remembers that he has a son who needs him.

Naseem's mother, realizing that the couple are truly in love, frees Naseem, who runs to the train. She recognizes Vijay immediately and hugs him, unaware that Gian is just on the other side of the tracks. When he calls her name, they begin to fight through the crowd to reach one another. Just as they meet Akbar pulls them apart and begins a struggle with Gian. Gian is pushed over the railing onto the tracks just as the train arrives and is killed. Naseem sobs hysterically as she slowly collapses to the ground.

Naseem and Vijay escape on the train as the police arrive for Akbar. With the help of Margaret and Walter they move to England and Avtar spreads Gian's ashes given by Walter over a banyan tree.

== Cast ==
- Jimi Mistry as Gian Singh / Mohammad Hassan
- Kristin Kreuk as Naseem Khan
- Neve Campbell as Margaret Stilwell
- John Light as Walter Hankins
- Irrfan Khan as Avtar Singh
- Madhur Jaffrey as Shanti Singh
- Arya Babbar as Akbar Khan
- Lushin Dubey as Mumtaz Khan
- Chenier Hundal as Zakir Khan
- Jesse Moss as Andrew Stilwell
- Jaden Rain as Vijay Singh
- Lakha Lakhwinder Singh as Special Appearance

== Nominations ==
- 2008 Genie Award for Best Achievement in Cinematography - Nominee
- 2007 Leo Award for Best Cinematography in a Feature Length Drama - Nominated
- 2007 Leo Award for Best Direction in a Feature Length Drama - Nominated
- 2007 Leo Award for Best Screenwriting in a Feature Length Drama - Nominated

== Release ==
Partition is a co-production between Canada, South Africa and the United Kingdom. The film was released to Canadian theatres on 2 February 2007, with a subsequent Region one (US and Canada) DVD release on 26 June 2007.

== See also ==
- List of Asian historical drama films
