= Trust (2021 film) =

2021 American romantic drama film directed by Brian DeCubellis

- Theatrical release poster
- Directed by: Brian DeCubellis
- Screenplay by: Kristen Lazarian; K.S. Bruce; Brian DeCubellis
- Based on: Push by Kristen Lazarian
- Produced by: Steven Klinsky; Brian DeCubellis; Tom Guida
- Starring: Katherine McNamara; Victoria Justice; Matthew Daddario; Lucien Laviscount; Ronny Chieng; Lindsey Broad
- Cinematography: David Tumblety
- Edited by: Ann Husaini
- Music by: Joel Douek; Greg Pliska
- Production companies: Untravelled Worlds; DeCubellis Films
- Distributed by: Vertical Entertainment
- Release date: March 12, 2021
- Running time: 94 minutes
- Country: United States
- Language: English

Trust is a 2021 American erotic romantic drama film directed by Brian DeCubellis, from a screenplay by Kristen Lazarian, K.S. Bruce, and DeCubellis, based on Lazarian's play Push. The film stars Victoria Justice, Matthew Daddario, Katherine McNamara, and Lucien Laviscount. The movie employs a non-linear narrative, with the story doubling back on itself as characters explain various ruses and deceptions.

== Plot ==
In New York City, Brooke Gatwick and Owen Shore are a young married couple who have been together since high school. Recently, they have been struggling with starting a family and Brooke opening her own art gallery, featuring paintings by Ansgar Doyle. Ansgar openly expresses an attraction to Brooke and constantly attempts to communicate with her in the middle of the night, irritating Owen.

Owen wants to go to Paris for Christmas and secretly buys airplane tickets for after the exhibit’s opening, hoping that decompressing will allow them to conceive a baby. However, Brooke wants to focus on the gallery. One night, Brooke sees odd text messages on Owen's phone and thinks that he may be cheating on her. Ansgar tells Brooke that Damien Light, a film director, is interested in buying his art and wants to meet with them in the Marias Hotel in Paris, which she reluctantly accepts. Frustrated with Brooke’s sudden departure, Owen accepts an assignment in Las Vegas for when they would have gone to Paris. Later, Brooke catches Owen leaving in the middle of the night, further increasing her suspicions about his infidelity, especially when he visits an address that's advertised online as a sort of "lovers' nest".

At a bar with his friend, Adam, Owen meets Amy, who says that she's a journalism major at Columbia. Amy recognizes Owen from his news program and starts flirting with him. Eventually, Owen takes Amy back to his home, where they have sex. They are interrupted by Brooke’s text messages. Owen, regretting their tryst, asks Amy to leave and to never meet again; Amy asks Owen for help with her career after she graduates.

After closing the deal in Paris, Brooke returns early to New York. Ansgar wants to display a nude painting of Brooke as the centerpiece of his gallery showing. On the night of the opening, Owen notices how close Ansgar and Brooke seem to be. Amy appears at the opening and attracts Ansgar’s attention. Owen lies to Brooke about meeting Amy at a bar the other night. Owen and Ansgar get into a fight, and Amy asks Ansgar to take her home. On their way to their apartment, Brooke begins poking holes in Owen’s story and even shows him an autographed napkin that Owen gave Amy the night at the bar. Owen eventually admits to sleeping with Amy, and Brooke angrily leaves while taking Owen’s phone to see what he's been doing at odd hours of the night.

Ansgar drops Amy off at Brooke and Owen’s apartment, where Amy tells Owen that she met Brooke several days ago. Brooke's friend Eleanor suggested hiring a "decoy" to test Owen’s faithfulness. While Amy is at the bar with Owen, Brooke texts her to cancel the ruse, but Amy ignores Brooke. On the day of the art opening, Amy meets with Brooke and lies about what happened with Owen as well as giving her the autographed napkin as proof that she did meet with him. Brooke pays Amy and invites her to the opening.

After dropping by Eleanor and Adam’s apartment, Brooke goes through Owen’s phone and finds out that he was not seeing other women but was working on a story about an unfaithful senator. "Sarah" is really one of Owen's colleagues and had arranged an apartment for him and Brooke if they go to Paris. Brooke goes back to her apartment to find Owen and Amy talking. Amy apologizes for crossing a professional line (after promising Brooke that she wouldn't actually have sex with Owen). Owen is upset that his wife created a situation that lured him into cheating on her. Amy gives back the money that Brooke paid her before leaving the apartment.

Owen asks if Brooke cheated on him with Ansgar in Paris, but Brooke refuses to answer. During Brooke’s time in Paris, Ansgar tries to seduce her. The movie shows Brooke partially undressed, but Brooke refuses to confirm or deny if she actually had sex with Ansgar.

Owen packs a piece of luggage for his trip to Las Vegas. Before he leaves, he shows Brooke the tickets that he bought for Paris, which they can still use. She thinks for a second about the future where she sees a daughter with them in Paris so she accepts him at last.

== Cast ==
- Victoria Justice as Brooke Gatwick, who quits her job to open her own art gallery
- Matthew Daddario as Owen Shore, Brooke's husband and a news reporter
- Katherine McNamara as Amy, a blonde hired by Brooke to check on her husband Owen if he cheats
- Lucien Laviscount as Ansgar Doyle, an Irish street artist known for his paintings of nude women
- Ronny Chieng as Adam, Owen's friend and a divorce attorney
- Lindsey Broad as Eleanor, Adam's wife who is also a divorce attorney, and Brooke's friend

== Release ==
Vertical Entertainment released the movie on March 12, 2021, in North America, the United Kingdom and Ireland, in select theaters and via paid video on demand.

== Reception ==
On the review aggregator website Rotten Tomatoes, the film holds an approval rating of 50% based on 10 critic reviews, with an average rating of 6.2/10.
