= Antiviral (film) =

2012 science fiction horror film

- Theatrical release poster
- Directed by: Brandon Cronenberg
- Written by: Brandon Cronenberg
- Produced by: Niv Fichman
- Starring: Caleb Landry Jones; Sarah Gadon; Douglas Smith; Joe Pingue; Nicholas Campbell; Sheila McCarthy; Wendy Crewson; Malcolm McDowell
- Cinematography: Karim Hussain
- Edited by: Matthew Hannam
- Music by: E.C. Woodley
- Production companies: Alliance Films; Rhombus Media; Telefilm Canada; TF1 International
- Distributed by: Alliance Films (Canada); UFO Distribution (France)
- Release dates: 19 May 2012 (Cannes); 12 October 2012 (Canada); 13 February 2013 (France)
- Running time: 108 minutes
- Countries: Canada; France
- Language: English
- Budget: C$3.3 million
- Box office: $123,407

Antiviral is a 2012 science fiction body horror film written and directed by Brandon Cronenberg in his feature-length directorial debut, from a script which had been partially adapted in 2008 as a short film, Broken Tulips. The film stars Caleb Landry Jones as an employee of a facility that sells diseases harvested from celebrities.

== Plot ==
Syd March is employed by Lucas Clinic, a company which purchases viruses and other pathogens from celebrities, then purposefully infects paying fans who desire a connection with their idols. The company puts a copy protection on its products, which render the pathogens incommunicable after infecting a client. The pathogens supplied by Hannah Geist, Lucas Clinic's exclusive celebrity, are extremely popular. Syd March's colleague, Derek Lessing, is responsible for directly harvesting them from Hannah.

To make extra money, Syd steals pathogens from the lab, bypasses the copy protection with a stolen console, and uses himself as an incubator. He then passes the pathogens to Arvid to sell on the black market. Arvid works at Astral Bodies, a celebrity meat market providing meat grown from the cells of celebrities.

After Derek is caught smuggling and arrested, Syd is tasked to replace him to harvest a pathogen from Hannah, who has recently fallen ill. After taking a blood sample from Hannah, Syd injects himself with some of her blood. After experiencing the first symptoms, fever and disorientation, he leaves work early. His attempts to remove the virus' copy protection are unsuccessful, and his console breaks down during the process.

The next day, Syd awakens from severe delirium to learn that Hannah has died from the unknown disease, and all products harvested from her have skyrocketed in popularity. To fix his console, Syd approaches Arvid, who sets up a meeting with Levine, the leader of the piracy group. Levine offers to fix the console in exchange for samples of Syd's blood, but Syd refuses. Levine restrains Syd and forcibly takes samples from him. Lethal pathogens are not legal to distribute, which only increase demands for the pathogen that killed Hannah.

The next day, a severely ill Syd is approached by two men, who drive him to a secret location that houses Hannah. The celebrity, whose death was fabricated to protect her, is barely alive, extremely weak and bleeding from her mouth. Hannah's physician, Dr. Abendroth, reveals the virus infecting them has been engineered with a mechanism to prevent analysis, which broke Syd's console. It is, in fact, a modified version of an illness that Hannah has had before. Abendroth reveals his infatuation with Hannah, showing samples of her skin grafted to his own arm. He derides Syd as "just another fan."

Syd returns to the Lucas Clinic, and traces the original strain of the virus to Derek, who sold it to a rival company, Vole & Tesser. Dr. Abendroth discovers that Vole & Tesser patented the modified strain, though their motives remain unclear. Before Syd can proceed further, he is abducted by Levine. Syd is put in a room where his deterioration and death will be broadcast on reality television to sate Hannah's fans, who could not witness her death. As Syd begins to show the final symptoms, he escapes by stabbing Levine in the mouth with a syringe and holding a nurse hostage with his infected blood. After Syd realizes that Vole & Tesser infected Hannah to harvest their own patented pathogen from her, Syd contacts them and negotiates a deal.

Some time later, a virtual reality version of Hannah advertises the "Afterlife" product, coming exclusively from Vole & Tesser. Syd now works for Vole & Tesser, where Hannah's cells have been replicated to form a distorted cell garden from Astral Bodies' celebrity meat technology. Viruses injected into her system are sold. Syd demonstrates a new virus as he sticks a needle into a genetically created arm. Later, while alone, Syd cuts the arm and drinks the flowing blood; it is revealed the arm is in fact Hannah's, as her deformed face and body are shown to be in the Cell Garden chamber.

== Cast ==
- Caleb Landry Jones as Syd March, an employee at Lucas Clinic
- Sarah Gadon as Hannah Geist, a world-class celebrity
- Malcolm McDowell as Dr. Abendroth, Hannah Geist's personal medic
- Douglas Smith as Edward Porris, a customer of Lucas Clinic
- Joe Pingue as Arvid, the owner of the Astral Bodies meat market and underground virus trafficker
- Nicholas Campbell as Dorian Lucas, the founder and owner of Lucas Clinic
- Sheila McCarthy as Dev Harvey, Hannah Geist's manager
- Wendy Crewson as Mira Tesser, co-owner of Vole & Tesser, Lucas Clinic's main competitor
- James Cade as Levine, an underground virus trafficker
- Lara Jean Chorostecki as Michelle, Lucas Clinic's archivist
- Lisa Berry as the Lucas Clinic receptionist
- Salvatore Antonio as Topp, an employee at Lucas Clinic
- Matt Watts as Mercer, an employee at Lucas Clinic
- Reid Morgan as Derek Lessing, an employee at Lucas Clinic
- Nenna Abuwa as Aria Noble, the second main celebrity in Lucas Clinic's catalogue
- George Tchortov as Portland
- Dawn Greenhalgh as Jane

== Production ==
Cronenberg has stated that the genesis of the film was a viral infection he once had. More precisely, the "central idea came to him in a fever dream during a bout of illness," wrote journalist Jill Lawless. Cronenberg said:

I was delirious and was obsessing over the physicality of illness, the fact that there was something in my body and in my cells that had come from someone else's body, and I started to think there was a weird intimacy to that connection. And afterwards I tried to think of a character who would see a disease that way and I thought: a celebrity-obsessed fan. Celebrity culture is completely bodily obsessed - who has the most cellulite, who has fungus feet? Celebrity culture completely fetishizes the body and so I thought the film should also fetishize the body - in a very grotesque way.

It was further shaped when he saw an interview Sarah Michelle Gellar did on Jimmy Kimmel Live!; what struck him was when "she said she was sick and if she sneezed she'd infect the whole audience, and everyone just started cheering."

Principal photography took place in Hamilton, Ontario and in Toronto.

== Release ==
The film competed in the Un Certain Regard section at the 2012 Cannes Film Festival. Cronenberg re-edited the film after the festival to make it tighter, trimming nearly six minutes out of the film. The revised film was first shown at the 2012 Toronto International Film Festival, and was a co-winner, alongside Jason Buxton's Blackbird, of the festival's Best Canadian First Feature Film award.

== Reception ==
Rotten Tomatoes reports that 65% of critics gave the film a positive review with an average score of 6/10, based on 93 reviews. The site's consensus reads, "Antiviral is a well crafted body horror, packed with interesting - if not entirely subtle - ideas." It holds a score of 55 out of 100 on review aggregator Metacritic, based on 18 reviews.

Writing for The Daily Telegraph, Tim Robey gives the film 4 stars, calling it "an eye-widening delve into conceptual science fiction," with the "gruesome verve" of his father David Cronenberg's early work, "and morbidity to match", and says "there's real muscle in its ideas, a potent kind of satirical despair, and a level of craft you rarely expect from a first-timer."

Writing for Empire, Kim Newman called it "a smart, subversive but rather cold debut". Variety's Justin Chang stated that Brandon Cronenberg "has his own distinct flair for the grotesque", but that "the film suffers from basic pacing issues" and that "Antiviral never builds the sort of character investment or narrative momentum that would allow its visceral horrors to seriously disturb." Stephen Garrett of The New York Observer described the film as "stomach-churning" and added that "the production, though impeccably polished and featuring an abundance of blood, spit, mucus, and pus, misses the mark with underdeveloped characters and a schematic plot. But boy, do those gory ideas and notions linger in the mind."

Peter Bradshaw of The Guardian was more negative, stating that "Brandon Cronenberg's movie is made with some technical skill and focus, but it is agonisingly self-regarding and tiresome."
