= Sarah Gadon =

Canadian actress (born 1987)

- Gadon in 2026
- Born: Sarah Lynn Gadon; April 4, 1987 (age 39); Toronto, Ontario, Canada
- Education: University of Toronto
- Occupation: Actress
- Years active: 1998–present
- Spouse: Max Fine (m. 2022)
- Children: 1

Sarah Lynn Gadon (born April 4, 1987) is a Canadian actress. She began her acting career guest-starring in a number of television series, such as Are You Afraid of the Dark? (1999), Mutant X (2002), and Dark Oracle (2004). She also worked as a voice actress on various television productions. Gadon gained recognition for her roles in David Cronenberg's films A Dangerous Method (2011), Cosmopolis (2012), and Maps to the Stars (2014). She also starred in Denis Villeneuve's thriller Enemy (2014), the period drama Belle (2013), and the action horror film Dracula Untold (2014).

In 2015, Gadon portrayed a young Elizabeth II in the comedy A Royal Night Out. The next year, she starred in the period film Indignation, and co-starred in the supernatural thriller The 9th Life of Louis Drax, and as Sadie Dunhill in the Hulu miniseries 11.22.63, an adaptation of Stephen King's novel 11/22/63. In 2017, Gadon played the lead role of Grace Marks in the CBC miniseries Alias Grace, which is based on the Margaret Atwood novel of the same name, and joined the cast of the Crave sitcom Letterkenny in its third season. The following year, she had a leading role in the period drama The Great Darkened Days. In 2019, Gadon starred in the third season of the HBO anthology series True Detective.

Gadon has received numerous accolades, including three Canadian Screen Awards for Alias Grace, Enemy, and The Great Darkened Days. In 2016, she earned the Award of Excellence by the Alliance of Canadian Cinema, Television, and Radio Artists (ACTRA).

== Early life and education ==
Sarah Lynn Gadon was born on April 4, 1987 in Toronto, Ontario, to a psychologist father and teacher mother. She has an older brother named James. Gadon has British and Italian ancestry.

She spent much of her childhood and adolescence training and performing as a dancer, with time spent as a Junior Associate at The National Ballet School of Canada and as a student at Cardinal Carter Academy for the Arts as well as Claude Watson School for the Performing Arts. She graduated high school as an Ontario Scholar from Vaughan Road Academy in 2005.

By 2014, she had completed her studies in the University of Toronto's Cinema Studies Institute at Innis College.

== Career ==
Gadon started acting at the age of 11 with her first acting role as Julia in an episode of La Femme Nikita (1998). For the next few years, she took episodic roles in various television series, including Monica in Are You Afraid of the Dark? (1999), Young Laura Burnham in Twice in a Lifetime (2000), Catherine Hartman in Mutant X (2002), Claudia in Dark Oracle in 2004, Vicki in Life with Derek (2005), and Tasha Redford in Flashpoint (2008).

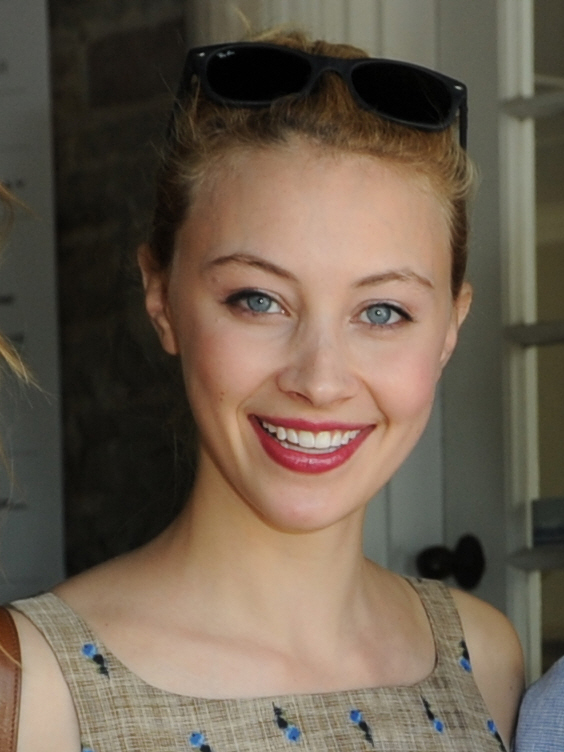
Gadon in 2011

She also has a number of television films to her credit. She was nominated for the Young Artist Award for Best Ensemble in a TV movie for her first film, The Other Me (2000), portraying Heather. Other roles include Sarah in Phantom of the Megaplex (2000), Samantha in What Girls Learn (2001), Amanda in Cadet Kelly (2002), Julia Norton in Code Breakers (2005) and Celeste Mercier in The Cutting Edge: Chasing the Dream (2008). Gadon had recurring roles in many television series: Zoe Kessler in The Border (2008–2009), Katie Atkins in Being Erica (2009), Georgia Bravin in Happy Town (2010) and Ruby Odgen in Murdoch Mysteries (2009–2011). She is also behind the voice of the title character in the animated series Ruby Gloom (2006–2008), Beth in Total Drama (2007–2011) and Portia in Friends and Heroes (2007–2009). Gadon was nominated for a Gemini Award in 2008 for Best Individual or Ensemble Performance in an Animated Program or Series for her work in Ruby Gloom.

In 2005, she filmed for Where Love Reigns, a promotional film co-starring Douglas Henshall.

Her filmography includes both feature-length and short films. Her first feature film was Fast Food High (2003) where she portrayed Zoe. She portrayed Margaret in the dark comedy Siblings, Priscilla in Charlie Bartlett (2007) and Laura in Leslie, My Name is Evil (2009).

Her short film work includes Haley in Burgeon and Fade (2007), Julia in Grange Avenue (2008) and Gabrielle in Spoliation (2008). Burgeon and Fade won the Special Jury Award at the WorldFest Houston Festival for original dramatic short film. She also starred in the short indie film, The Origin of Teddy Bears, as Madison.

In 2011, Gadon starred in David Cronenberg's Cosmopolis, alongside Robert Pattinson, as his on-screen wife of 22 days, Elise Shifirin. She played Phillippa in the television adaptation of Ken Follett’s bestseller World Without End, an eight-hour event series. She featured in Brandon Cronenberg's debut feature, Antiviral as Hannah Geist, a mega-star in a sci-fi world where fans pay to be infected with the diseases of the rich and famous.

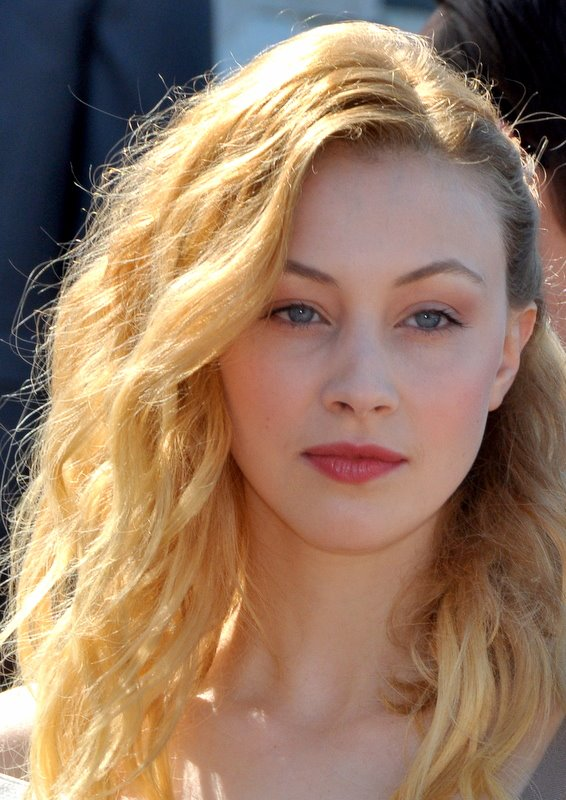
Gadon at the 2012 Cannes Film Festival

In 2012, she appeared as Carl Jung's wife Emma in the David Cronenberg film A Dangerous Method and in a Canadian short film, Yellow Fish, alongside J. Adam Brown. On May 23, 2012 in Cannes, Birks presented the first Birks Canadian Diamond award to Gadon and Emily Hampshire during Telefilm Canada's inaugural Tribute To Canadian Talent press event and reception.

She played Miss Elizabeth Murray in the 2013 release of the film Belle. She co-starred in Denis Villeneuve's Enemy (2013), based on the José Saramago book, The Double (2002), and in David Cronenberg's Maps to the Stars (2014), a dark comic look at Hollywood excess.

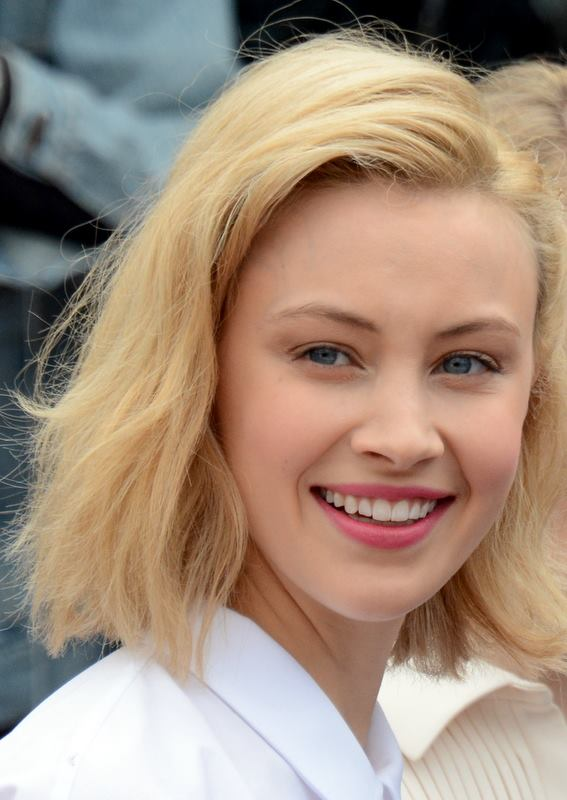
Gadon at the 2014 Cannes Film Festival

She participated in the CBC "Canada Reads" competition in March 2014. In September 2014, it was announced that she was cast in Miramax's supernatural thriller The 9th Life of Louis Drax, along with Jamie Dornan and Aaron Paul. The film was released in September 2016. Gadon played Dracula's wife Mirena (and briefly the modern-day Mina) in the historical action film Dracula Untold, released in October 2014.

Gadon and Don McKellar in 2018

Gadon made her directorial debut with an episode of Reelside, a documentary series, which focused on her collaborative relationship with photographer Caitlin Cronenberg; the episode premiered on The Movie Network in Canada June 4, 2015. In 2015, Gadon appeared as Princess Elizabeth in A Royal Night Out, a deeply fictionalized account of the future Queen's incognito night on the town, along with her sister Princess Margaret, on the evening of VE Day.

In 2016, Gadon starred opposite Logan Lerman in Indignation, an adaptation of Philip Roth's 2008 novel of the same title, and opposite James Franco in 11.22.63, a television mini-series version of Stephen King's novel of the same title. In 2017, Gadon played Victorian era convicted murderer Grace Marks in the CBC miniseries Alias Grace, which is based on the Margaret Atwood novel of the same name. For her performance, she won her second Canadian Screen Award.

In 2019, she starred in the third season of the HBO anthology series True Detective. She also co-starred with Hong Chau in the film American Woman directed by Semi Chellas.

In 2021, she starred in the film All My Puny Sorrows with Alison Pill, as two Mennonite sisters who leave their religious lives behind. Gadon won Best Supporting Actress in a Canadian Film from the Vancouver Film Critics Circle Awards for her role in the movie.

In September 2022, it was announced that Gadon has signed to direct her first feature film, an adaptation of Heather O'Neill's 2006 novel Lullabies for Little Criminals.

== Personal life ==
Gadon was in a relationship with film editor and director Matthew Hannam. In a January 2019 joint interview, the pair explained that their shared experience of temporary stays in foreign cities was part of the inspiration for the short film Paseo, the first film in which Hannam directed Gadon.

Gadon married Max Fine in September 2022. She revealed her pregnancy by showing off her baby bump at the premiere of Ferrari in December 2023.

== Filmography ==
=== Film ===
Year	Title	Role	Notes
2003	Fast Food High	Zoe	
2004	Siblings	Margaret	
2007	Charlie Bartlett	Priscilla	
2009	Leslie, My Name Is Evil	Laura	
2011	A Dangerous Method	Emma Jung	
2011	The Moth Diaries	Lucy Blake	
2011	Dream House	Cindi	
2012	Antiviral	Hannah Geist	
2012	Cosmopolis	Elise Shifrin	
2013	Enemy	Helen St. Claire	
2013	Belle	Lady Elizabeth Murray	
2013	The F Word	Megan	
2014	The Nut Job	Lana	Voice role
2014	The Amazing Spider-Man 2	Kari	
2014	Maps to the Stars	Clarice Taggart	
2014	Dracula Untold	Mirena / Mina Murray	
2015	The Girl King	Countess Ebba Sparre	
2015	A Royal Night Out	Princess Elizabeth	
2016	Indignation	Olivia Hutton	
2016	The 9th Life of Louis Drax	Natalie	
2018	The Death & Life of John F. Donovan	Liz Jones	
2018	Octavio Is Dead!	Tyler Kent	
2018	The Great Darkened Days	Helen	
2018	Paseo	Alice	Short film
2019	American Woman	Pauline	
2020	Black Bear	Blair	
2020	Vampires vs. the Bronx	Vivian	
2021	All My Puny Sorrows	Elf Von Riesen	
2022	Corner Office	Alyssa	
2022	North of Normal	Michelle Person	
2023	Ferrari	Linda Christian	
2023	Seagrass	Carol	
2023	Coup!	Julie	
2025	A Big Bold Beautiful Journey	David's ex-fiancée	
TBA	Flint	Nancy Kennigan	Post-production
TBA	Alien Boy	Ellen Connolly	Post-production
TBA	The Lightkeeper	Edith	Filming

=== Television ===
Year	Title	Role	Notes
1998	La Femme Nikita	Julia	Episode: "Last Night"
1999	Are You Afraid of the Dark?	Monica	Episode: "The Tale of the Forever Game"
2000	Twice in a Lifetime	Young Laura Burnham	Episode: "Even Steven"
2000	The Other Me	Heather	Television film
2000	In a Heartbeat	Jennifer	3 episodes
2000	Phantom of the Megaplex	Sarah	Television film
2000–2001	Mattimeo: A Tale of Redwall	Cynthia Vole / Tess Churchmouse	13 episodes
2001	What Girls Learn	Samantha	Television film
2002	Mutant X	Catherine Hartman	Episode: "Whiter Shade of Pale"
2002	Cadet Kelly	Amanda	Television film
2002	Mom's on Strike	Jessica Harris	Television film
2002	The Strange Legacy of Cameron Cruz	Lucy Montgomery	Unsold television pilot
2002	Society's Child	Nikki Best	Voice role; television film
2003	Doc	Terri Lewis	Episode: "Angels in Waiting"
2003	My Dad the Rock Star	Alyssa	5 episodes
2004	This Is Wonderland	Zoe Kelsey	Episode: "#1.13"
2004	Dark Oracle	Claudia	Episode: "Crushed"
2004–2005	The Eleventh Hour	Cassie Redner	Episodes: "Gone Baby Gone", "Kettle Black"
2005	Time Warp Trio	Jodie	5 episodes
2005	Life with Derek	Vicki	Episode: "The Wedding"
2005	Code Breakers	Julia Nolan	Television film
2006–2008	Ruby Gloom	Ruby Gloom	Lead voice role
2007–2009	Friends and Heroes	Portia	35 episodes
2007–2011	Total Drama	Beth / Ginger	Voice roles; 46 episodes
2008	The Cutting Edge: Chasing the Dream	Celeste Mercier	Television film
2008	Flashpoint	Tasha Redford	Episode: "Attention Shoppers"
2008–2009	The Border	Zoe Kessler	14 episodes
2009	Aaron Stone	Dr. Martin	Episode: "In Hall We Trust"
2009	Being Erica	Katie Atkins	14 episodes
2009–2011	Murdoch Mysteries	Ruby Ogden	4 episodes
2010	Happy Town	Georgia Bravin	8 episodes
2010	The Dating Guy	Darlene	Voice role; episode: "Gross Encounters of the Virgin Kind"
2012	World Without End	Philippa	Miniseries
2015	The Plateaus	Trek's Mom	Web series; episode: "#1.10"
2016	Man Seeking Woman	Kelly	Episode: "Wings"
2016	11.22.63	Sadie Dunhill	8 episodes
2017	Alias Grace	Grace Marks	6 episodes
2017–2018	Letterkenny	Gae	10 episodes
2018–2022	Total DramaRama	Beth	Voice role; 24 episodes
2019	True Detective	Elisa Montgomery	Recurring role, 7 episodes
2019	Castle Rock	Rita Green	Episodes: "The Laughing Place", "The Mother"
2020	Most Dangerous Game	Val	15 episodes
2025	Wayward	Laura Redman	8 episodes

== Awards and nominations ==
Year (Note: Year in which awards ceremony was held.)	Association	Category	Work	Result	Ref.
2001	Young Artist Award	Best Ensemble in a TV Movie	The Other Me	Nominated	
2008	Gemini Award	Best Individual or Ensemble Performance in an Animated Program or Series	Ruby Gloom	Nominated	
2009	ACTRA Award	Outstanding Performance – Female	Flashpoint	Nominated	
2009	Gemini Award	Best Performance by an Actress in a Guest Role, Dramatic Series	Flashpoint	Nominated	
2012	Vancouver Film Critics Circle	Best Supporting Actress in a Canadian Film	Cosmopolis	Won	
2014	Canadian Screen Award	Best Supporting Actress	Enemy	Won	
2014	International Online Cinema Award	Best Supporting Actress	Enemy	Nominated	
2014	Vancouver Film Critics Circle	Best Supporting Actress in a Canadian Film	Enemy	Nominated	
2016	ACTRA Award	Award of Excellence	Herself	Won	
2018	Canadian Screen Award	Best Lead Actress, Television Film or Miniseries	Alias Grace	Won	
2018	Online Film & Television Association	Best Actress in a Motion Picture or Limited Series	Alias Grace	Nominated	
2018	ACTRA Award	Outstanding Performance – Female	Alias Grace	Nominated	
2019	Kingston Reelout Film Festival	Outstanding Lead Performance	Octavio Is Dead!	Nominated	
2019	Canadian Screen Award	Best Supporting Actress	The Great Darkened Days	Won	
2022	Vancouver Film Critics Circle Award	Best Supporting Actress in a Canadian Film	All My Puny Sorrows	Won	
