= The Double (Saramago novel) =

2002 novel by José Saramago

- First edition (publ. Caminho)
- Author: José Saramago
- Original title: O Homem Duplicado
- Translator: Margaret Jull Costa
- Language: Portuguese
- Genre: Novel
- Publisher: Editorial Caminho
- Publication date: 2002
- English publication date: 2004
- Pages: 324 (en.)
- ISBN: 0-151-01040-4

The Double (Portuguese: O Homem Duplicado) is a 2002 novel by Portuguese author José Saramago, who won the Nobel Prize in Literature in 1998. In Portuguese, the title is literally "The Duplicated Man." It was translated into English and published as The Double in 2004.

== Plot summary ==
Tertuliano Máximo Afonso is a divorced high school history teacher who spends his nights reading about Mesopotamian civilizations. One day Tertuliano rents a movie recommended by a colleague and sees an actor who looks exactly like him. Tertuliano becomes obsessed with meeting the actor and spends weeks discovering the actor's name. Posing as a film student and using his girlfriend's address, he sends a letter to the production company asking to be put in contact with the actor. His relationship with his girlfriend, Maria da Paz, suffers because he refuses to disclose his motives to her. After acquiring the actor's phone number and address, Tertuliano stalks his double, António Claro, and eventually telephones him. António's wife answers and mistakes Tertuliano's voice for her husband's. Initially, António dismisses Tertuliano and refuses to meet, but later contacts him and agrees. They decide to meet at António's country home in a week.

Tertuliano buys a fake beard and goes to meet António. Upon arrival, the men strip down and find that they are indeed physically identical. They have the same birth date. Their voices are identical and they share the same scars and moles. António asks Tertuliano to clarify one more thing: the exact time he was born. He wants to know which of them is the "original" and which the copy. Tertuliano says that he was born at two in the afternoon. António smugly informs Tertuliano that he was born a half-hour earlier, making him the original. Tertuliano gets up to leave, saying that he at least has the compensation of knowing that António will be the first to die, and that he will become the original in turn. To this António responds, "Well, I hope you enjoy those thirty-one minutes of personal, absolute, and exclusive identity, because that is all you will enjoy from now on." The men agree that they have no reason to ever meet again, and Tertuliano leaves.

Tertuliano sends the fake beard to António, who has not been able to stop thinking about their encounter. Meanwhile, Tertuliano and Maria get engaged to be married. António wonders how Tertuliano acquired his phone number and address. He visits the production company office and retrieves the letter Tertuliano authored and sent in Maria's name. Donning the fake beard, António stakes out Maria's apartment and, finding her very attractive, he follows her to work. António realizes that Tertuliano has not told Maria about his double.

Soon after, António pays Tertuliano a visit at home. He shows Tertuliano the letter with Maria's signature. Threatened, Tertuliano tells him to leave, saying he will call the police. António says that he will call Maria and tell her of Tertuliano's forgery. Tertuliano asks what he wants, and António says he intends to spend the night with Maria. António has already contacted her while pretending to be Tertuliano and invited her to look at a country home with him, his country home. António wants revenge for Tertuliano's intrusion into his stable married life. Furious and ashamed, Tertuliano gives António his clothes, identification, and the keys to his car.

After António leaves, Tertuliano exchanges his clothes for some in António's closet. He drives in António's car to António's house, where he has sex with António's wife Helena that night. In the morning, she makes him breakfast while he reads the paper without her ever suspecting that he is not her husband.

Meanwhile, Maria and António have spent the night together. In the morning, Maria wakes first and notices the indentation on António's finger from his wedding ring. She deduces that he is not Tertuliano and demands she be allowed to leave.

Tertuliano had hoped that António would return to find him in bed with Helena. As time passes without António returning home, he becomes anxious about Maria, leaves António and Helena's home, and rushes to a pay phone to call Maria's house. A colleague of Maria's answers the phone and tells him that Maria died earlier that morning in a car accident.

Tertuliano checks into a hotel and calls his mother to tell her he is alive. She meets him at the hotel and he tells her the entire story. The next day, he buys a newspaper to learn the details of the accident: a head-on collision with a truck. The truck driver, when questioned by police, said that the passengers in the car appeared to be quarreling before their automobile crossed the center lane and crashed into the truck.

Tertuliano returns to António's house and reveals his identity to Helena, explaining that the man who died was her husband. He gives her António's identification and asks for her forgiveness. She responds: "Forgive is just a word." Helena asks Tertuliano to stay with her and take the place of her husband, and he accepts her invitation.

Three days later, as Tertuliano is reading about Mesopotamian civilization, the phone rings. He answers and a man on the other end of the line exclaims, "At last!" in a voice identical to his own. The man says he has been trying to reach him for months and claims to be his double. Tertuliano agrees to meet him in a nearby park that night. Tertuliano changes his clothes, loads the pistol he keeps in the house, and puts it into his belt. He writes Helena a note, "I'll be back", and leaves for his rendezvous in the park.

== Critical reception ==
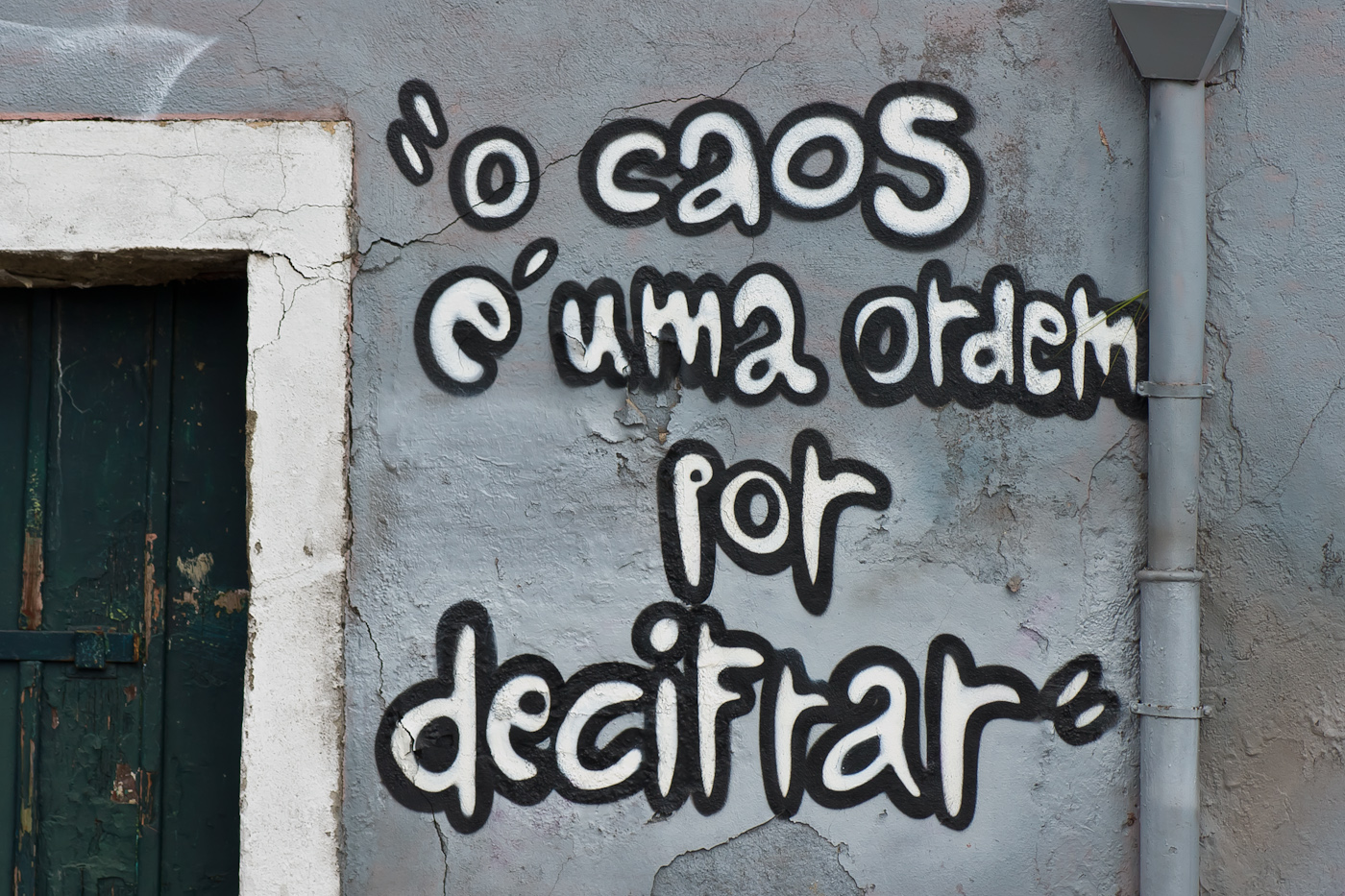
Graffiti with quote from The Double: O caos é uma ordem por decifrar ("Chaos is order yet undeciphered.")

Alberto Manguel in The Guardian said Saramago did not push the concept of the double far enough, noting that every culture plays with this idea. He wrote:

Old as our fears, the familiar figure of the double haunts the literatures of every country.... Since the immutable laws of nature insist that something cannot exist in two places at the same time, a man and his double cannot both remain alive: one of the two must vanish for the order of the universe to be respected. It is no unfair disclosure to say that a death is the novel's conclusion.

Jonathan Carroll of The Washington Post criticized the novel, saying that he displays:

...an obvious archness, an authorial sneer at the fantastical subject matter that quickly distances the reader from any emotional involvement with either the character or his situation. As a result, we don't care what happens to Afonso or how he ends up.

John Banville in The New York Times wrote of The Double: "His take on the theme is clever, alarming and blackly funny..." Banville continues about Saramago's work: "He has Kafka's petrified detachment, Celine's merry ferocity and the headlong, unstoppable style of the Beckett of Malone Dies and The Unnamable." John Updike praised the novel at length in The New Yorker as did the reviewer for the London Review of Books.

== Film adaptation ==
Denis Villeneuve directed a Canadian thriller feature film, Enemy in 2013, with a screenplay adapted by Javier Gullón from this novel. Set in Toronto, it stars Jake Gyllenhaal in a dual role as the physically identical men Adam and Anthony, Isabella Rossellini as Adam's mother, Mélanie Laurent as the professor Adam's girlfriend Mary, and Sarah Gadon as the actor Anthony's wife Helen. The novel shares a quote with the film, shown in the opening scene:

"Chaos is order yet undeciphered."
