= Trial at Fortitude Bay =

- Directed by: Vic Sarin
- Starring: Henry Czerny; Raoul Trujillo; Lolita Davidovich
- Country of origin: Canada
- Original language: English

Production
- Producers: Margit Nance, Christopher Zimmer
- Budget: $3,000,000 CAD

Original release
- Release: 1994

Trial at Fortitude Bay is a television film released in 1994 and directed by Victor Sarin. It stars Henry Czerny, Raoul Trujillo, and Lolita Davidovich.

Davidovitch plays Giana Antonelli, an attorney assigned to defend an Inuk youth from charges of sexual assault against a minor. The boy, Paloosie (played by Paul Gordon), asserts that he has not committed a crime, and the village elders believe that he has already made up for it. Czerny plays Daniel Metz, a prosecuting attorney eager to punish Paloosie under Canadian law. The film highlights the conflict between governmental and traditional systems of law, and also Canada's conflicts with the native peoples over self governance.

== Cast ==
- Lolita Davidovich as Gina Antonelli
- Henry Czerny as Daniel Metz
- Raoul Trujillo as Simon Amituq
- Robert Ito as Methusala
- Marcel Sabourin as Judge Lambert
- Paul Gordon as Pauloosie
- Dave Brown as Corporal Anderchuk
- Tanya Enook as Natsik
- Barbara Gordon as Josephine Kant

== Awards ==
The film received two Gemini Award nominations at the 10th Gemini Awards in 1996, for Best Supporting Actor in a Drama Program or Series (Robert Ito) and Best Writing in a Dramatic Program or Mini-Series (Keith Ross Leckie).
