= Patricia Finn =

Patricia Finn is a Canadian writer from Vancouver, British Columbia, best known for her debut novel The Golden Boy.

After studying classical philosophy in university, she worked for much of her career in film and television production, in both Canada and New Zealand. Most notably, she was cowriter with Vic Sarin of the 2007 film Partition, for which they received a Leo Award nomination for Best Screenwriting in a Feature Length Drama.

The Golden Boy was published in 2026. It was shortlisted for the 2026 Barnes & Noble Discover Prize, and longlisted for the 2026 Giller Prize.
