= The Lightkeeper =

- Directed by: Vic Sarin
- Written by: Ciaran Creagh
- Produced by: Kim Roberts; Tina Pehme; Larry Bass; Mary Callery; Aaron Farrell
- Starring: Dominic Cooper; Sarah Gadon
- Cinematography: Vic Sarin
- Edited by: Austin Andrews
- Music by: Johan Söderqvist
- Production companies: Sepia Films; Shinawil
- Release date: February 20, 2026 (DIFF)
- Countries: Ireland; Canada
- Language: English

The Lightkeeper (or Cry from the Sea) is an Irish-Canadian romantic drama film written by Ciaran Creagh, directed by Vic Sarin and starring Dominic Cooper and Sarah Gadon.

== Cast ==
- Dominic Cooper as Seamus
- Sarah Gadon as Edith
- Aidan Quinn as Father MacGabhann
- Sarah Bolger as Maire
- David Pearse as O'Rathaile
- RaeAnne Boon as Brigid
- Jaden Rain as Weeshie
- Keith McErlean as Paddy Joe
- Seán Óg Hasson as young Weeshie

== Production ==
In July 2021, it was announced that Telefilm Canada and Screen Ireland have boarded the project.

In August 2022, it was announced that Quinn was cast in the film.

In August 2023, Dominic Cooper was revealed to be cast in the film. Also same month, it was announced that Sarah Gadon and Sarah Bolger were also cast in the film.

Filming began in September 2023.

== Release ==
The film premiered at the Dublin International Film Festival in February 2026. It is slated to have its Canadian premiere in the Borsos Competition program at the Whistler Film Festival.
