= Sugar (2022 film) =

- Release movie poster
- Directed by: Vic Sarin
- Written by: Vic Sarin; Annelies Kavan; Ben Johnstone
- Produced by: Tina Pehme; Kim Roberts; Pablo Salzman; Israel Gonzalez
- Starring: Katherine McNamara; Jasmine Sky Sarin; Éric Bruneau; Alex Timpano
- Cinematography: Vic Sarin
- Edited by: Mark Shearer
- Music by: Keith Power; Matthew Chalmers
- Production companies: Sepia Film; Connect3 Media; Kanan Films
- Distributed by: Amazon Prime Video
- Release date: November 18, 2022
- Running time: 101 minutes
- Countries: Canada; Mexico
- Languages: English; German

Sugar is a 2022 Canadian crime drama film directed by Vic Sarin and co-written by Annelies Kavan and Ben Johnstone. Starring Katherine McNamara and Jasmine Sky Sarin. The story is loosely inspired by the true story of Cocaine Cowgirls.

The film was released on November 18, 2022 in Canada on Amazon Prime Video and premiered on June 4, 2023 on Lifetime in the United States, under the title Danger Below Deck.

== Synopsis ==
The story follows two young influencers who are enticed into a luxurious cruise through the Caribbean and South Pacific. The dream vacation they hope for, turns into a nightmare when they get entangled with a drug smuggling operation.

== Cast ==
- Katherine McNamara as Chloe Belle. The character was based on Isabelle Legacé.
- Jasmine Sky Sarin as Melanie Roussard. The character was based on Melina Roberge.
- Éric Bruneau as Jules
- Anthony Timpano as Sean
- Armand Assante as Ernie
- Kwami Onwuachi as Carl
- Audrey Rannou as Emma

== Production ==
In November 2021, it was announced that McNamara was cast in the film and that Spencer List was attached to also appear.

== Release ==
The film was released on Amazon Prime Video on November 18, 2022 in Canada.
