= Sam Steele and the Junior Detective Agency =

2009 American film

- DVD release poster
- Directed by: Tom Whitus
- Written by: Tom Whitus
- Produced by: William F. Connelly; Judee Sauget; Tom Whitus
- Starring: Jacob Hays; Darren Kennedy; Katherine McNamara; Jilanne Klaus; M. Emmet Walsh; Luke Perry
- Cinematography: Jeffrey McLeid
- Edited by: George Maranville
- Music by: Nathan Lanier
- Production companies: Silver Hills Pictures; Three Blondes Film Company; Zingraff Motion Pictures
- Distributed by: Screen Media Films
- Release dates: November 22, 2009 (SLIFF); January 4, 2011 (DVD release)
- Running time: 87 minutes
- Country: United States
- Language: English

Sam Steele and the Junior Detective Agency (also known as Jr. Detective Agency) is a 2009 American mystery comedy film directed and written by Tom Whitus and starring Jacob Hays, Darren Kennedy, Katherine McNamara, Jilanne Klaus, M. Emmet Walsh and Luke Perry. The film follows 13-year-old Sam Steele Jr. (Hays), who creates a detective agency and attempts to track down a burglar known as "The Cat" (Perry).

Sam Steele and the Junior Detective Agency had its premiere at the St. Louis International Film Festival on November 22, 2009, and was released by Screen Media Films on January 4, 2011. A sequel, titled Sam Steele and the Crystal Chalice, was released on November 21, 2011.

== Premise ==
Following in his father's footsteps, Sam Steele Jr. forms the Jr. Detective Agency. Meanwhile, a French thief known as "The Cat" is stealing jewelry and art from museums in Des Moines, and Sam's father is one of the detectives attempting to track him down. When Emma, a new girl in the neighborhood, teams up with Sam and comes across an important tip, they try and catch the thief before he steals an original Michelangelo painting.

== Cast ==
- Luke Perry as "The Cat"
- M. Emmet Walsh as Chief Van Owen
- Jacob Hays as Sam Steele Jr.
- Darren Kennedy as Detective Sam Steele
- Katherine McNamara as Emma Marsh
- Jilanne Klaus as Kathy Steele
- Mik Scriba as Deputy Fire Chief Daniel Carr
- Tammy Brice as Ms. Carmichael
- Nick Gehlfuss as Martinson Radio (voice)

== Production ==
In May 2009, Luke Perry and M. Emmet Walsh were cast in Sam Steele and the Junior Detective Agency. Filming began on June 1, 2009, in Des Moines, Iowa.

== Release ==
Sam Steele and the Junior Detective Agency premiered at the St. Louis International Film Festival on November 22, 2009, and was released direct-to-video by Screen Media Films on January 4, 2011.

== Reception ==
Brian Costello of Common Sense Media gave the film a positive review, praising Hays' lead performance and stating that the film was "most enjoyable when the 13-year-old aspiring detective has internal monologues attempting the hard-boiled noir-speak of Raymond Chandler novels."

== Sequel ==
A sequel to the film, titled Sam Steele and the Crystal Chalice, was released direct-to-video on November 21, 2011.
