= Matthew Hannam =

Canadian film and television editor and director

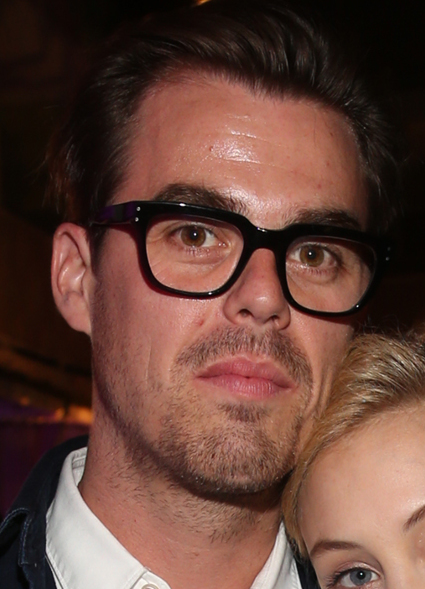
Matthew Hannam

Matthew Hannam (born September 8, 1981) is a Canadian film and television editor and director. He is a two-time Canadian Screen Award winner for editing, winning the award for Best Film Editing at the 2nd Canadian Screen Awards in 2014 for his work on the film Enemy and the award for Best Editing in a Comedy Series at the 3rd Canadian Screen Awards for his work on the series Sensitive Skin, and was a Genie Award nominee for Best Film Editing at the 31st Genie Awards in 2011 for the film Trigger.

His other credits include the films This Movie Is Broken, Oliver Sherman, Into the Forest, Enemy, Vox Lux, Antiviral, James White, Wildlife and The Nest, and the television series Doctor*Ology, Michael: Every Day, Less Than Kind, Sensitive Skin and The OA.

His debut short film as a director, Paseo, was released in 2018 and was named to the Toronto International Film Festival's annual year-end Canada's Top Ten list.
