= Summer in the City =

Summer in the City may refer to:

- Summer in the City (film), 1970
- "Summer in the City" (song), 1966 song by the Lovin' Spoonful
- "Summer in the City", a song by Regina Spektor from the album Begin to Hope, 2006
- "Summer in the City", a 2017 song by Now United
- Summer in the City: Live in New York, a 2000 live album by Joe Jackson and Sheldon Steiger
- "Summer in the City" (Frankie Drake Mysteries), a 2017 television episode

== See also ==
- Hot Summer in the City, 1976 American adult film
- Social in the City, a YouTube event formerly called Summer in the City
- Summer and the City, a young-adult novel written by Candace Bushnell
- "Somewhere in My Heart", a song by Aztec Camera
