= Enemy (2013 film) =

2013 film by Denis Villeneuve

- Theatrical release poster
- Directed by: Denis Villeneuve
- Screenplay by: Javier Gullón
- Based on: The Double by José Saramago
- Produced by: M. A. Faura; Niv Fichman
- Starring: Jake Gyllenhaal; Mélanie Laurent; Sarah Gadon; Isabella Rossellini
- Cinematography: Nicolas Bolduc
- Edited by: Matthew Hannam
- Music by: Danny Bensi and Saunder Jurriaans
- Production companies: Pathé; Entertainment One; Telefilm Canada; Corus Entertainment; Televisión Española; Movie Central; The Movie Network; Ontario Media Development Corporation; Mecanismo Films; micro_scope; Rhombus Media; Roxbury Pictures
- Distributed by: Entertainment One (Canada); Alfa Pictures (Spain); Condor Entertainment (France)
- Release dates: 8 September 2013 (TIFF); 14 March 2014 (Canada); 28 March 2014 (Spain); 27 August 2014 (France)
- Running time: 90 minutes
- Countries: Canada; Spain; France
- Language: English
- Box office: $3.5 million

Enemy is a 2013 psychological thriller film directed by Denis Villeneuve and produced by M. A. Faura and Niv Fichman. Written by Javier Gullón, the film is loosely adapted from the 2002 José Saramago novel The Double. The film stars Jake Gyllenhaal in a dual role as two men who are physically identical, but different in personality. Mélanie Laurent, Sarah Gadon, and Isabella Rossellini co-star. Enemy is an international co-production of companies from Spain, France and Canada.

The film premiered in the Special Presentation section at the 2013 Toronto International Film Festival on September 8. Upon its wide release by A24 on March 14, 2014, the film earned $3.4 million at the box office and received positive reviews.

== Plot ==
At an underground club, a man attends an erotic show which culminates with a naked woman about to crush a live tarantula under her high-heel.

Adam Bell, a college history professor, lives a quiet, mundane life in Toronto. He rents a film, Where There's a Will There's a Way, on the recommendation of a colleague, and spots an actor who looks strikingly like himself playing a bellhop. Searching online, Adam identifies the actor as Anthony Claire. Adam rents the other two films in which Anthony has appeared and becomes obsessed with the man, who appears to be his physical twin. Immediately afterwards, Adam searches some boxes in his own house and finds a photo of someone who looks like himself, with a woman's hand over his shoulder. However, part of the photo is torn out, making the woman impossible to identify.

Adam stalks Anthony, visiting his talent agency, where he is mistaken for Anthony and given a confidential letter. Discovering Anthony's apartment in Mississauga, Adam calls the home, but reaches Anthony's pregnant wife, Helen. She also mistakes Adam's voice for Anthony's and assumes it's a joke, but Adam insists he is not Anthony. This frightens Helen, and Adam abruptly ends the call.

Adam calls again later and reaches Anthony, who assumes Adam is a stalker and tells him not to call again. Helen confronts Anthony about the phone call and Adam's existence, but Anthony insists he knows nothing. Unconvinced, Helen researches Adam, discovers the college where he teaches, and finds him. Helen is visibly stunned by her husband's doppelgänger, though Adam does not realize who Helen is.

Anthony eventually calls Adam, and they meet in a hotel room. There, the two discover they are perfectly identical, even having the same scar on their chests. Adam is taken aback by Anthony's direct personality, says the meeting was a mistake, and quickly leaves. The two men begin having similar dreams featuring first a naked woman with a spider's head, and later a giant, skyscraper-sized spider walking amidst the Toronto skyline.

The next day, Anthony stalks Adam, and sees Adam's girlfriend, Mary. Anthony accuses Adam of sleeping with his wife and then shames and manipulates Adam into letting him sleep with Mary to "get even.” He demands Adam's clothes and car keys for a night, after which he promises to disappear forever, and Adam complies. Anthony impersonates him and takes Mary to a hotel.

Meanwhile, Adam goes to Anthony's apartment in retaliation and is let inside. The building concierge desperately asks "Anthony" to take him back to the underground sex club. Inside the apartment, Adam finds a framed photo on a shelf which looks like the one he had found earlier in his own house, but now the photo is intact, and the woman is revealed to be Helen. Adam tries to act as Anthony in front of Helen, but it appears that she recognizes his nicer demeanor. She pretends not to notice and cuddles with him. Later that night, however, Helen wakes to find Adam crying and apologizing; she tells him she prefers him and asks him to stay, then has sex with him.

Back at the hotel, Mary panics during sex when she notices Anthony's wedding-ring mark and asks who he really is. Anthony claims he has always had the mark. She forces Anthony to drive her home; the two get into a fight in the car which results in a high-speed crash, presumably killing them both. A shattered car window forms the pattern of a spider web.

The next day, Adam dresses in Anthony's clothes and finally opens the confidential letter he received earlier. He finds a key to the underground sex club, given only to select members. He resolves to go there and shouts to Helen that he's going out, but he hears no response. As he enters the bedroom, instead of Helen, he sees a room-sized tarantula cowering against the rear wall. With a resigned look, Adam sighs.

== Cast ==
- Jake Gyllenhaal in a dual role as Adam Bell and Anthony Claire
- Mélanie Laurent as Mary
- Sarah Gadon as Helen Claire
- Isabella Rossellini as Mother
- Kedar Brown as a security guard
- Darryl Dinn as the video store clerk
- Joshua Peace as Carl, Adam's colleague
- Tim Post as Anthony's concierge
- Misha Highstead, Megan Mane, Alexis Uiga as the Ladies in the Dark Room
- Jane Moffat as Eve (uncredited)
- Stephen R. Hart as Bouncer (uncredited)

== Production ==
Principal photography began on May 22, 2012 in Toronto, and production ran all the way until it was initially released at TIFF on September 8, 2013. Before the film was bought by A24, the film was produced and sold by the French film company Pathé International. To accomplish the scenes where the lookalikes meet, a motion-controlled camera with a dolly was used, with a tennis ball helping Gyllenhaal keep a consistent eyeline.

== Adaptation ==
The plot of the film was taken from Saramago's novel The Double, though adapted loosely. Villeneuve stated that "there’s a lot of differences" between his film and the 2002 novel. He further stated that

"[t]he best way to respect an author is to be very honest about the way you adapted and to totally destroy the original and make it your own."

This style can also be seen in Villeneuve's adaptation of Frank Herbert's Dune.

== Themes ==
A review in IndieWire compared the film to Christopher Nolan's Memento, and called it an "engrossing Kafka-esque provocative psychological thriller" that "doesn't reveal itself easily".

Both director Villeneuve and leading actor Gyllenhaal spoke of their desire to make the film a challenging exploration of the subconscious. To Villeneuve, Enemy is ultimately about repetition: the question of how to live and learn without repeating the same mistakes.

Regarding the two physically identical characters, Villeneuve hinted that "[y]ou don't know if they are two in reality, or maybe from a subconscious point of view, there's just one. It's maybe two sides of the same persona … or a fantastic event where you see another [self]."

Gyllenhaal said that Enemy is "about a man who is married, his wife is pregnant, and he’s having an affair. He has to figure himself out before he can commit to life as an adult."

Forrest Wickman of Slate pointed out that the opening line of the film, "Chaos is order yet undeciphered", is from the José Saramago novel The Double, on which the film is based. Wickman suggests that Enemy is "a parable about what it's like to live under a totalitarian state without knowing it," and adds that the central irony is that even though the main character is an expert on the ways of totalitarian governments, he does not see the web that has overtaken the city until he is already stuck in it. To Wickman, Enemy suggests that this tendency to create totalitarian regimes is part of human nature, that it comes from within us, citing Villeneuve:

"Sometimes you have compulsions that you can't control coming from the subconscious … they are the dictator inside ourselves."

Isabella Rossellini, daughter of Roberto Rossellini and Ingrid Bergman, says that the film leans into her father's genre of Neo-realism. Rossellini loves the way Villeneuve directs, saying he "is never very explicit. You can feel the lurid atmosphere of the striptease club, but you don't really see anything."

== Reception ==
=== Box office ===
Enemy opened in a single theater in North America and grossed $16,161. Expanding later, the widest release for the film was 120 theaters. It ended up earning $1,008,726 domestically and $2,388,721 internationally for a total of $3,397,447.

=== Critical response ===
Enemy received 121 reviews on Rotten Tomatoes; 72% of these reviews were deemed positive, and the film's rating average was calculated as 6.6 out of 10. The site's consensus states: "Thanks to a strong performance from Jake Gyllenhaal and smart direction from Denis Villeneuve, Enemy hits the mark as a tense, uncommonly adventurous thriller." The film also has a score of 61 out of 100 on Metacritic, based on 30 reviews, indicating "generally favorable" reviews.

A. O. Scott, movie critic for The New York Times, wrote: "In any case, much of the fun in 'Enemy,' which is tightly constructed and expertly shot, lies in Mr. Gyllenhaal's playful and subtle performances... Its style is alluring and lurid, a study in hushed tones and yellowy hues, with jolts of anxiety provided by loud, scary music." Enemy was also praised by David Ehrlich of Film.com for having "the scariest ending of any film ever made." Richard Corliss of Time was more reserved, saying the film (at 90 minutes) was nearly an hour too long.

=== Awards and nominations ===
Enemy earned ten nominations at the 2nd Canadian Screen Awards, winning five, including Best Director for Villeneuve, and Canadian Screen Award for Best Supporting Actress for Gadon. It was named Best Canadian Film of the Year at the Toronto Film Critics Association Awards 2014.
