= People of Our Times =

Canadian documentary television series

- Genre: Documentary
- Country of origin: Canada
- Original language: English
- No. of seasons: 3

Production
- Producers: John McGreevy; Jeannine Locke

Original release
- Network: CBC Television
- Release: 9 September 1974 – 17 April 1977

People of Our Times is a Canadian documentary television series that aired on CBC Television from 1974 to 1977.

== Premise ==
Each episode featured a particular noted cultural personality providing a television essay on a particular topic.

== Scheduling ==
This half-hour series was broadcast as follows (times in Eastern):

Day	Time	Season run		Notes
Mondays	10:30 p.m.	9 September 1974	18 November 1974	first season
Sundays	2:00 p.m.	13 July 1975	3 August 1975	rebroadcasts
Mondays	10:30 p.m.	1 September 1975	27 October 1975	second season
Sundays	2:00 p.m.	2 January 1977	17 Apr 1977	rebroadcasts

== Episodes ==
1974

- "3 1/2 Cheers for Toronto", a tour of the city according to Robertson Davies (debut, 9 September 1974)
- "The Politics of Experience", R. D. Laing
- "The Vassar Girl, 1933-74", Mary McCarthy recounts America in the context of the Watergate scandal
- "Let Us Be True To One Another", Vivian Rakoff, concerning loneliness
- "Enough of a Terrible Beauty", Conor Cruise O'Brien of Ireland concerning The Troubles
- "Am I My Brother's Keeper?", Jessica Mitford discusses the prison system
- "Stewart Alsop - A Memoir", a posthumous broadcast in which the American journalist discusses his mortality
- "Guardian of Dreams", featuring British singer Mabel Mercer
- "Reflections From The Waterfront", with American author Eric Hoffer
- "The Prospects For Humanity", Arnold Toynbee

1975

- "Coming Home Again", in which Mordecai Richler speaks of his years outside Canada and his desire to move back
- "A Celebration", with Michel Tremblay whose plays initially found few audiences outside Quebec
- "Will There Always Be An England?", with A. J. P. Taylor
- "Perceptions of France", Mavis Gallant
- "The Devil's Decade", concerning the 1930s, hosted by Claud Cockburn
- "Defending The Peaceable Isles", concerning self-government in Scotland with Scottish National Party leader Donald Stewart
- an essay with Jiddu Krishnamurti
- series finale with Arnold Toynbee
