= High Ground (2025 film) =

- Release movie poster
- Directed by: James Bamford
- Written by: Bill Sodheim; John Thaddeus
- Produced by: Steven Paul
- Starring: Charlie Weber; Jon Voight; Katherine McNamara; Henry Thomas
- Production companies: Paramount Studio; SP Media Group
- Distributed by: Republic Pictures
- Release date: March 18, 2025
- Running time: 92 minutes
- Country: United States
- Language: English

High Ground is a 2025 American action-thriller film directed by James Bamford and written by Bill Sodenhiem and John Thaddeu. The film stars Charlie Weber, Jon Voight, Katherine McNamara and Henry Thomas. The film shooting location was in Bulgaria. The film was released on VOD and digital platform on March 18, 2025.

== Synopsis ==
Set in a small town of Colorado, Jake a newly appointed town sheriff facing the wrath of a ruthless cartel after a mysterious prisoner is thrown in the local jail. With the help of his girlfriend Cassie and his father Ezra, Jake is forced to protect his town from a gang of criminals that threatens to harm them.

== Cast ==
Main cast

- Charlie Weber as Jake Wilcott
- Jon Voight as Ezra Wilcott
- Katherine McNamara as Cassie Baker
- Henry Thomas as Nathaniel Matheson
- James Oliver Wheatley as Marcus Novak

Supporting cast

- Dustin Ingram as Billy Giles
- Skyler Shaye as Sharon Doyle
- Nebli Basani as Albert
- Max Krauss as Griff
- Charlton Weston as Rosie
- Howard Dell as Dan
- Ian Brooker as Clyde
- Greg Patmore as Otis
