= Katherine McNamara =

American actress (born 1995)

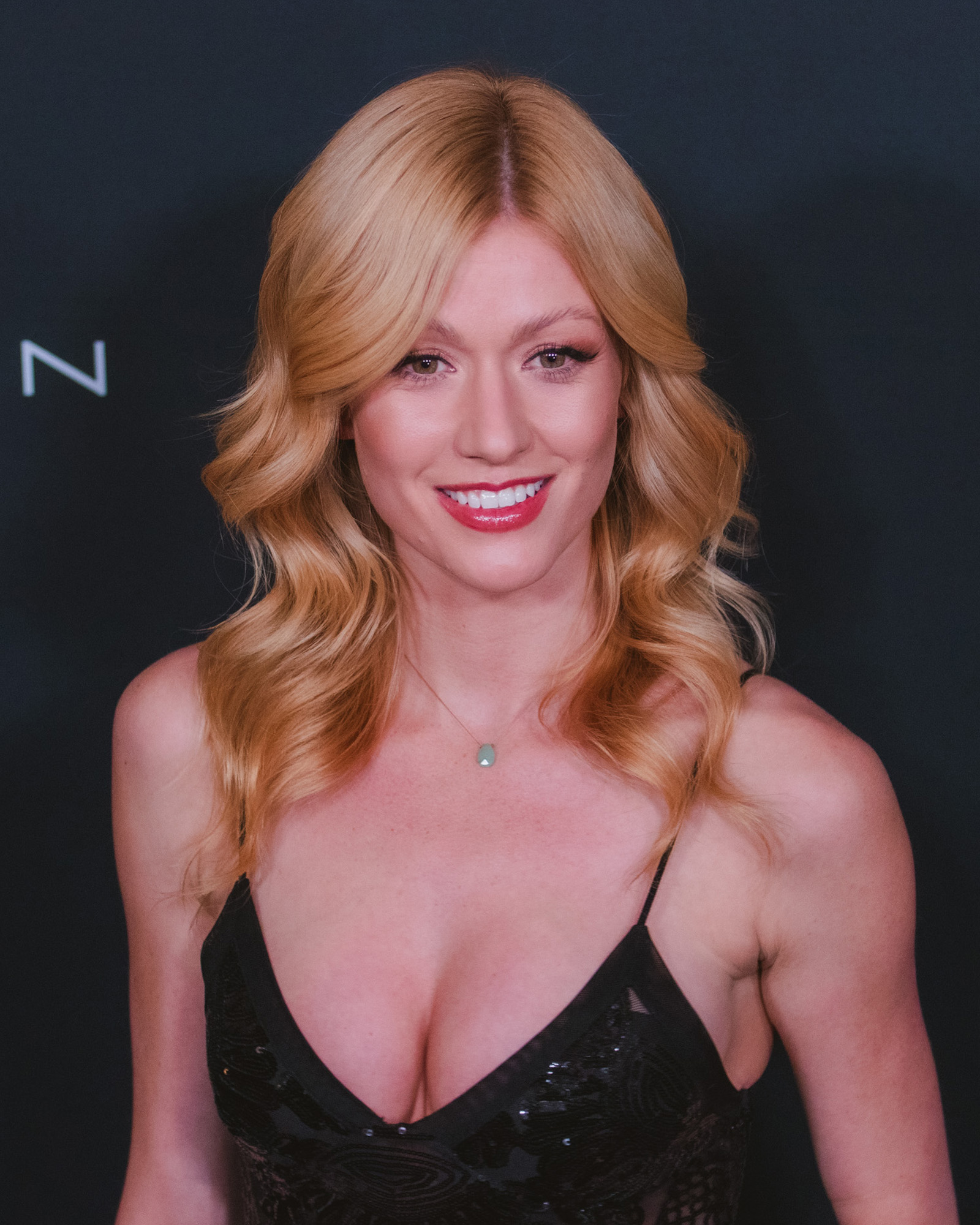
- McNamara at the WWD Style Awards in 2026
- Born: Katherine Grace McNamara; November 22, 1995 (age 30); Kansas City, Missouri, U.S.
- Education: Drexel University
- Occupation: Actress
- Years active: 2006–present

Katherine Grace McNamara (born November 22, 1995) is an American actress. She portrayed Clary Fray on the 2016–2019 supernatural drama series Shadowhunters, receiving a Teen Choice Award and a People's Choice Award for her work. In 2022, she starred in the western action series Walker: Independence as Abby Walker, which earned her a Critics Choice Super Award for Best Actress in an Action Series nomination. She also portrayed Mia Smoak in the superhero series Arrow and starred as Julie Lawry in the post-apocalyptic miniseries The Stand. Her film roles include Lily Bowman in the 2011 romantic comedy New Year's Eve, Rosa in the 2015 drama A Sort of Homecoming, Sonya in the second and third films of the dystopian science fiction film series Maze Runner, and Amy in the 2021 thriller Trust.

== Early life and education ==
McNamara was born in Kansas City, Missouri, the only child of Ursula McNamara, a research scientist and college professor and Evan McNamara, who served in the U.S. military. She was raised in Lee's Summit, Missouri, and moved to Los Angeles, California in 2011.

While growing up, McNamara was an advanced student in certain subjects, resulting in her being partly homeschooled; she received her high school diploma at age 14. At age 17, McNamara graduated summa cum laude with a Bachelor of Science degree in Business Administration from Drexel University, completing much of her course work online. In July 2017, she said that she was enrolled in an online master's degree literature program at Johns Hopkins University.

== Career ==
=== Acting ===
McNamara began her acting career on stage in Kansas City. She then participated in motion picture productions filmed in the Kansas City area, such as Matchmaker Mary in 2008 and the short film "Get Off My Porch". In 2010, she appeared in the 2009 Broadway revival of A Little Night Music with Catherine Zeta-Jones and Angela Lansbury. She began making guest appearances in television series, including Law & Order: SVU, 30 Rock, and Drop Dead Diva. McNamara appeared in theatrical movies such as New Year's Eve and in the Disney Channel original movie Girl vs. Monster, playing the role of Myra Santelli. She co-starred in the film Tom Sawyer & Huckleberry Finn, playing the role of Tom's girlfriend Becky Thatcher. McNamara also appeared in the independent films Contest and A Sort of Homecoming.

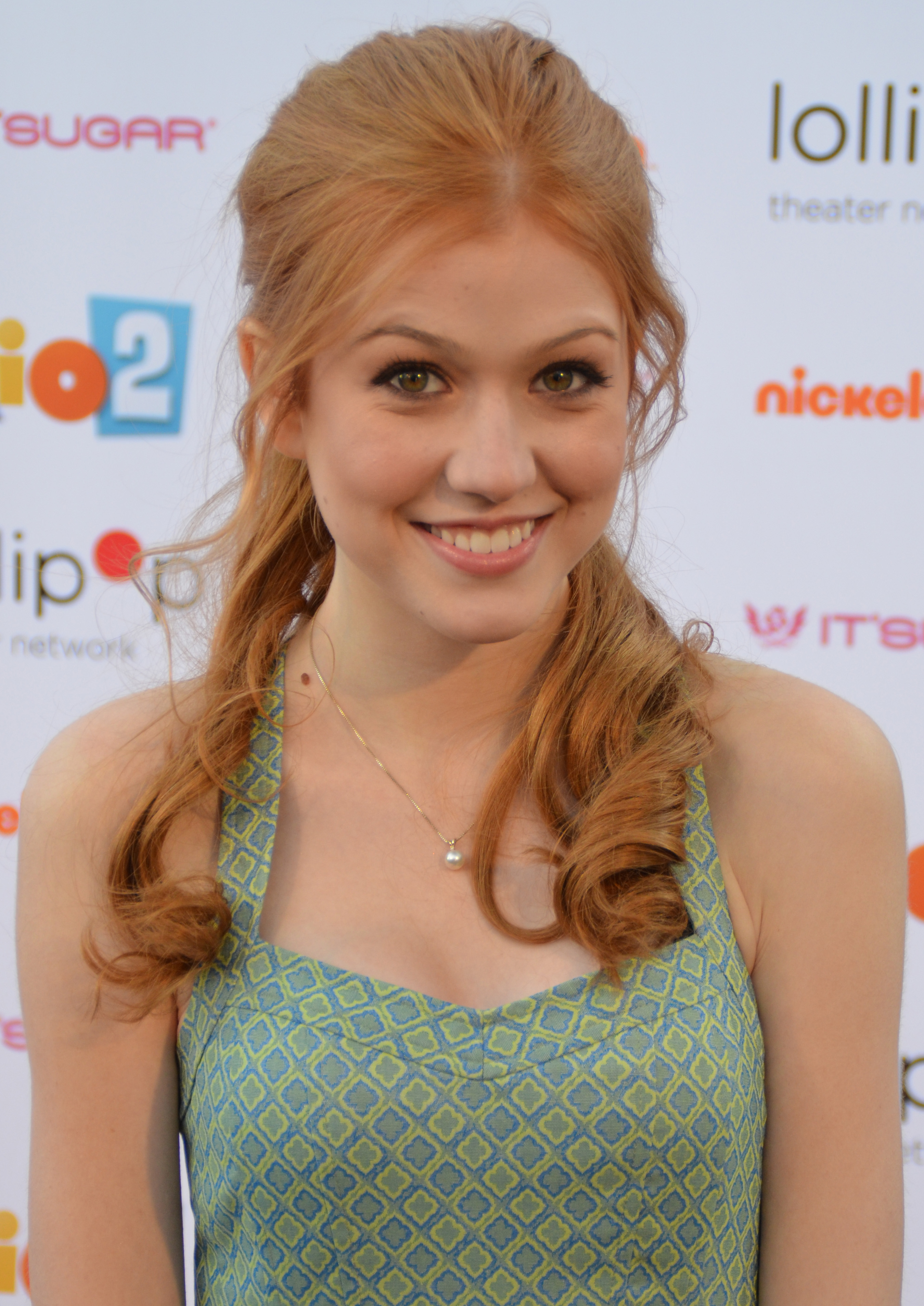
McNamara in an interview with Mingle Media in 2014

She appeared on three episodes of the Disney XD series Kickin' It, in which she had a recurring role as Claire, Kim's rival, and in two episodes of the Disney Channel series Jessie, playing Bryn Brietbart, a rival to Emma Ross. She also appeared as Myra Santelli in Girl vs. Monster, and as Tara Campbell in an episode of the Nickelodeon series The Thundermans. McNamara was cast in the MTV series Happyland as Harper Munroe, a theme park photographer. It was announced that McNamara would playing the recurring role of Kat on the third season of The Fosters in 2015.

On May 6, 2015, ABC Family (now Freeform) announced that McNamara would be playing the lead character Clary Fray in Shadowhunters, a television adaptation of Cassandra Clare's bestselling book series The Mortal Instruments. McNamara appeared in The Maze Runner film sequel, Maze Runner: The Scorch Trials, as Sonya, a co-leader of Group B. She reprised the role in the 2018 sequel, Maze Runner: The Death Cure.

In September 2018, McNamara was cast in the seventh season of Arrow as the recurring character of Mia Smoak, the daughter of Oliver Queen and Felicity Smoak; McNamara was later promoted to a series regular for Arrow's eighth and final season. In October 2019, The CW announced plans for a potential Arrow spin-off featuring Mia Smoak. A backdoor pilot for the spin-off aired as the ninth episode of Arrow's final season. However, in January 2021, The CW passed on ordering the spin-off to series. In August 2021, The CW announced that McNamara would return as Mia Queen in the five-episode "Armageddon" storyline at the beginning of The Flash Season 8.

In October 2019, McNamara was cast as Julie Lawry in the CBS All Access limited series adaptation of Stephen King's The Stand. Principal photography on the limited series was completed in March 2020, and CBS All Access announced a premiere date of December 17, 2020.

In November 2018, McNamara joined the cast of a Charlie Day film, formerly known as El Tonto, and eventually retitled Fool's Paradise before a release in 2023. During May and June 2020, McNamara participated in the making of Untitled Horror Movie, a movie that was shot by cast members receiving direction from Nick Simon via remote videoconferencing. This was due to restrictions necessitated by COVID-19 distancing protocols. In 2021, QCode released The Burned Photo, a horror podcast, with McNamara as a member of the voice cast. The same year, she was also added to the voice cast of the animated film The Adventures of Bunny Bravo.

In March 2022, McNamara was cast in the lead role in the pilot to Walker: Independence, a planned prequel series to Walker. She portrays Abby Walker, the ancestor of Jared Padalecki's Cordell Walker. The same month, she was added to the cast of the film Jade, which is stuntman James Bamford's directorial debut. On April 11, 2022, she began hosting a Shadowhunters rewatch podcast with co-star Dominic Sherwood called Return to the Shadows. McNamara also starred as Chloe Belle in the Amazon Prime film Sugar (marketed on Lifetime as Danger Below Deck) alongside Jasmine Sky Sarin which was loosely based on the real-life story of the Cocaine Cowgirls.

McNamara starred as a rookie U.S. Secret Service agent in the 2024 film Air Force One Down. In December 2024, McNamara wrapped production on the film Coyotes in Colombia.

=== Singing ===
During the course of her career, McNamara has sung songs that were used in movies or television series in which she appeared. She wrote and sang "Chatter" for Contest, and she also appeared in a music video for that song. She wrote "My Heart Can Fly", which her character sings during a talent competition in Little Savages. She sang "Wait for You", the end credits song for A Sort of Homecoming. She also sang "Stay True", the end credits song for R.L. Stine's Monsterville: Cabinet of Souls. Her song "Ember" was played during the 20th episode of the second season of Shadowhunters.

In December 2019, McNamara was featured as the voice of singer Sally Jessup in the animated Christmas special episode of the DreamWorks series Spirit Riding Free entitled "Spirit of Christmas", which premiered on Netflix. She also provided the vocals for several songs featured in the special. In November 2020, McNamara released "What Do We Got to Lose" on digital music platforms. Her song "Making a Monster Out of Me" became available on digital music platforms on December 17, 2020. She released "Love Me Like That" across various digital music platforms on February 14, 2021. All of these songs were recorded several years earlier, when McNamara was building a music portfolio.

== Philanthropy ==
McNamara has participated in anti-bullying efforts by describing how she was bullied as a child. McNamara has also worked with the Lollipop Theater Network, visiting children who are confined to hospitals due to the severity of their illnesses. In 2017, she recorded the song "Glass Slipper", which was used as part of a charity campaign for the United Nations Girl Up program. She also created a t-shirt with the "Glass Slipper" lyrics as part of this campaign. Since 2018, she participated in the Big Slick Celebrity Weekend, which raises donations for the Kansas City Children's Mercy Hospital.

On March 31, 2020, McNamara announced that she was working on a song originally recorded in 2014 called "Just Like James", based on the Ian Fleming character James Bond. It was released April 8, 2020 in the Google Play Store, Apple's iTunes store, and Spotify. Proceeds from the song were donated to the World Health Organization (WHO) for COVID-19 relief efforts. Google donated funds matching sales from the first 30 days.

On May 8, 2020, McNamara participated in a live-reading adaptation of Jane Austen's Pride & Prejudice with Acting for a Cause.

== Filmography ==
=== Film ===
Year	Title	Role	Notes
2008	All Roads Lead Home	Fair Goer	Uncredited role
2008	Matchmaker Mary	Mary Carver	also known as Beyond Puppy Love
2009	Sam Steele and the Junior Detective Agency	Emma Marsh	also known as Jr. Detective Agency
2011	Sam Steele and the Crystal Chalice	Emma Marsh	also known as The Junior Spy Agency
2011	Last Will	Wedding Guest	
2011	New Year's Eve	Lily Bowman	Segment: "Mother & Daughter"
2012	Last Ounce of Courage	Caroler	
2013	Contest	Sarah O'Malley	
2014	Tom Sawyer & Huckleberry Finn	Becky Thatcher	
2015	A Sort of Homecoming	Rosa	
2015	Maze Runner: The Scorch Trials	Sonya	
2016	Little Savages	Tiffany	
2016	Natural Selection	Paige Thomas	
2016	Is That a Gun in Your Pocket?	Sandy Keely	
2017	Charlotte	Mary	Segment: "Get Off My Porch"
2018	Maze Runner: The Death Cure	Sonya	
2019	Assimilate	Hannah	Originally titled Replicate
2020	Monster Killers	Mary	Segment: "Get Off My Porch"
2021	Trust	Amy	Originally titled Push
2021	Finding You	Taylor Risdale	Originally titled There You'll Find Me
2021	Untitled Horror Movie	Chrissy	Direct-to-video film; also executive producer
2022	Sugar	Chloe Belle	Streaming film; also known as Danger Below Deck on Lifetime
2022	The Adventures of Bunny Bravo	Cat	
2023	Fool’s Paradise	Terry	Formerly known as El Tonto
2024	Air Force One Down	Allison Miles	
2024	Jade	Layla	
2025	High Ground	Cassie Becker	
2025	The Queen's Jewels	Lala	
2025	Coyotes	Kat	
2025	Montana Mavericks	Heather	Limited theatrical release
TBA	The Knocking	N/A	Executive producer Post-production
TBA	And Love Knocked	Emily	Post-production
TBA	White	Sam Swatek	Post-production
TBA	Cheap AF	TBA	Post-production
TBA	Big Tiger	TBA	Post-production
TBA	Cocaine Island	Maya	Post-production

=== Television ===
Year	Title	Role	Notes
2010	Great Performances	Singer	Episode: "Sondheim! The Birthday Concert"
2011	Law & Order: Special Victims Unit	Jasmine	Episode: "Flight"
2011	30 Rock	Meagan	Episode: "TGS Hates Women"
2011	Drop Dead Diva	Ann Logan	Episode: "Ah, Men"
2012–2013	Kickin' It	Claire	3 episodes
2012	Glee	Bunhead #1	Episode: "Makeover"
2012	Girl vs. Monster	Myra Santelli	Television film (Disney Channel)
2012	Sketchy	Iris	Episode: "This Is 14"
2012	Madison High	Cherri O'Keefe	Unsold television pilot
2013	Touch	Evie Woods	Episode: "Reunions"
2013	Jessie	Bryn Breitbart	Episodes: "Kids Don't Wanna Be Shunned", "Diary of a Mad Newswoman"
2013	The Haunting Hour: The Series	Jodanna	Episode: "Worry Dolls"
2013	The Thundermans	Tara Campbell	Episode: "Dinner Party"
2013	The Surgeon General	Lily Sherman	Unsold television pilot
2014–2016	Transformers: Rescue Bots	Priscilla Pynch	Recurring voice role; 6 episodes
2014	CSI: Crime Scene Investigation	Angela Ward / Tangerine	Episode: "Long Road Home"
2014	Workaholics	Haley	Episode: "Beer Heist"
2014	Unforgettable	Young Carrie Wells	Episode: "Reunion"
2014	Happyland	Harper Munroe	Main role
2014	A Wife's Nightmare	Jackie	Television film (Lifetime)
2015	The Fosters	Ekaterina	3 episodes
2015	Monsterville: Cabinet of Souls	Lilith	Television film
2016–2019	Shadowhunters	Clary Fray	Main role
2016	The Grinder	Ginger	Episode: "From the Ashes"; uncredited
2016	Indiscretion	Lizzy Simon	Television film (Lifetime)
2018–2020	Arrow	Mia Smoak	Recurring role (season 7); main role (season 8)
2018	Happy Together	Sara	Episode: "Home Insecurity"
2019	Spirit Riding Free: Spirit of Christmas	Sally Jessup	Voice role; television special
2019	Supergirl	Mia Smoak	Episode: "Crisis on Infinite Earths Part 1"
2019	Batwoman	Mia Smoak	Episode: "Crisis on Infinite Earths Part 2"
2019, 2021	The Flash	Mia Smoak	Episodes: "Crisis on Infinite Earths Part 3", “Armageddon, Part 5”
2020	Acting for a Cause	Lydia Bennet	Episode: "Pride and Prejudice"
2020	Kappa Kappa Die	Charise	Television special
2021	The Stand	Julie Lawry	Miniseries; recurring role
2022	Love, Classified	Taylor Bloom	Television film (Hallmark Channel)
2022	Dance Dads	Kassie Goodhart	Television film
2022–2023	Walker: Independence	Abby Walker	Main role
2024	True Justice: Family Ties	Casey Barlow	Television Film (Hallmark Channel)
2025	Égypte IV: Double Agenda	Agent 867-5309	Supporting role, 6 episodes
2026	True Justice: Eye for an Eye	Casey Barlow	Television Film (Hallmark Channel)
2026	True Justice: Deep Cuts	Casey Barlow	Television Film (Hallmark Channel); Post-production
TBA	The Devouring Gray	N/A	Producer

=== Theater ===
Year	Production	Role(s)	Playwright	Venue	Refs.
2007	The Happy Elf	—N/a	Harry Connick Jr.	Kansas Coterie Theater	
2008	The Crucible	—N/a	Arthur Miller	Metro Ensemble Theater	
2008	Inherit the Wind	—N/a	Jerome Lawrence and Robert Edwin Lee	Metro Ensemble Theater	
2009	To Kill a Mockingbird	—N/a	Harper Lee	Kansas City Repertory Theater	
2010	A Christmas Story: The Musical	Easter Jane	Benj Pasek and Justine Paul	Kansas Starlight Theater	
2010-2011	A Little Night Music	Fredericka Armfeldt	Hugh Wheeler	Broadway Theater	

=== Podcasts ===
Year	Title	Role	Notes
2020	Day by Day	Zoe	Voice role; episode: "Unspoken Truth"
2021	Bobby Wonder	Mighty Mila	Voice role
2021–2022	The Burned Photo	Kira Barrington	Voice role
2025	DC High Volume: Batman	Wilcox	Voice role
2025	Sacrilege: Curse of the Mbirwi	Alicia	Voice role; 2 episodes
2025-2026	The Legend of Taylore	Morana "Mara" Tod	Voice role; 3 episodes

=== Short stories ===
Year	Title	Role	Notes
2007	The Bride & the Groom	Wedding Guest	Romance
2010	Get Off My Porch	Mary	Thriller
2010	The Nuclear Standard	Penny	Drama, Sci-Fi
2015	Beyond the Shadows: The Making of Shadowhunters	Clary Fray / Herself	Action
2016	Horoscopes	Kat	Comedy
2023	Haunted Stories and Tales of Horror	N/A	Horror; Producer
TBA	Samaritan	Carly	Horror

== Awards and nominations ==
Year	Award	Category	Nominated work	Result	Ref
2016	Teen Choice Awards	Choice TV: Breakout Star	Shadowhunters	Nominated	
2018	People's Choice Awards	Female TV Star	Shadowhunters	Won	
2018	Teen Choice Awards	Choice TV: Sci-Fi/Fantasy Actress	Shadowhunters	Nominated	
2019	Teen Choice Awards	Choice TV: Sci-Fi/Fantasy Actress	Shadowhunters	Won	
2023	Critics' Choice Super Awards	Best Actress in an Action Series	Walker: Independence	Nominated	
2024	HollyShort Film Festival	Rising Star Award	—N/a	Won	
2025	Los Angeles Film Awards	Best Actress	The Queen's Jewel	Won	
