= List of awards and nominations received by Jake Gyllenhaal =

Jake Gyllenhaal awards and nominations
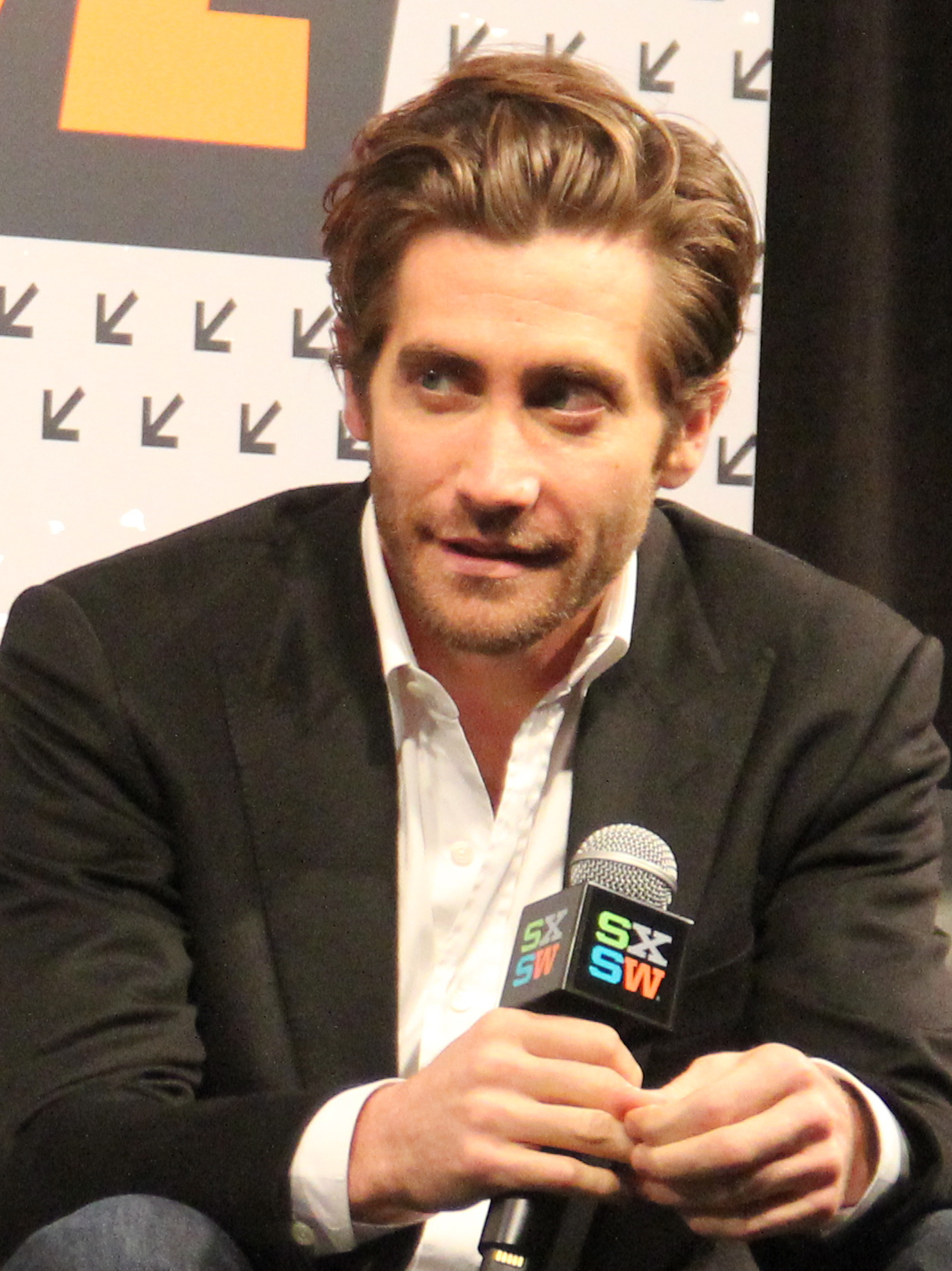
- Gyllenhaal at SXSW in 2016
Awards and nominations
Award	Wins	Nominations
Academy Awards	0	1
Actor Awards	0	3
British Academy Film Awards	1	3
Golden Globe Awards	0	3
Tony Awards	0	3

Totals (Note: Certain award groups do not simply award one winner. They acknowledge several different recipients, have runners-up, and have third place. Since this is a specific recognition and is different from losing an award, runner-up mentions are considered wins in this award tally. For simplification and to avoid errors, each award in this list has been presumed to have had a prior nomination.)
- Wins: 30
- Nominations: 90

Jake Gyllenhaal is an American actor who has received various awards and nominations, including a BAFTA Award, in addition to nominations for an Academy Award, three Golden Globe Awards, three Tony Awards, and a Primetime Emmy Award.

After making his acting debut in City Slickers (1991), Gyllenhaal's first nominations were for October Sky (1999), an American biographical film about NASA engineer Homer Hickam. His performance as the title character in the 2001 psychological thriller film Donnie Darko earned him a Young Hollywood Award and a nomination for the Independent Spirit Award for Best Male Lead. Gyllenhaal's role of Jack Twist in Ang Lee's romance Brokeback Mountain (2005) opposite Heath Ledger received critical acclaim. In addition to receiving the BAFTA Award for Best Actor in a Supporting Role and the MTV Movie Award for Best Performance, he was nominated in the Best Supporting Actor category at the 78th Academy Awards, the 11th Critics' Choice Awards, the 10th Satellite Awards, and the 12th Screen Actors Guild Awards. In 2010, he starred in the romantic comedy-drama film Love & Other Drugs, leading to Best Actor nominations at the 68th Golden Globe Awards and the 15th Satellite Awards.

Gyllenhaal received numerous accolades for his performance in Nightcrawler (2014), in which he plays a stringer who records violent late-night events and sells the footage to the media. He was recognised by several regional film critics associations and was nominated as Lead Actor for the Actor Award, BAFTA Award, Golden Globe Award and Critics' Choice Movie Award, with his miss in the Best Actor Oscar category considered by many to be a snub. (Note: Attributed to multiple sources.) In 2016, he starred in Nocturnal Animals, receiving another nomination for the BAFTA Award for Best Actor in a Leading Role. Gyllenhaal's portrayal of Boston Marathon bombing survivor Jeff Bauman in Stronger (2017) earned him the Hollywood Actor Award at the Hollywood Film Awards, as well as Best Actor nominations at the 23rd Critics' Choice Awards and the 22nd Satellite Awards.

Gyllenhaal's theatrical debut was in Kenneth Lonergan's London revival of This Is Our Youth in 2002, for which he won the Evening Standard Theatre Award for Outstanding Newcomer. For his performance in the Broadway play Sea Wall/A Life, he was nominated for Best Leading Actor in a Play at the 74th Tony Awards. On television, he starred in the Apple TV+ limited series Presumed Innocent (2025) for which he was nominated for the a Primetime Emmy Award for Outstanding Lead Actor in a Limited Series or Movie and Golden Globe Award for Best Actor – Drama Series.

== Major associations ==
=== Academy Awards ===
Year	Category	Nominated work	Result	Ref.
2005	Best Supporting Actor	Brokeback Mountain	Nominated	

=== Actor Awards ===
Year	Category	Nominated work	Result	Ref.
2005	Outstanding Performance by a Male Actor in a Supporting Role	Brokeback Mountain	Nominated	
2005	Outstanding Performance by a Cast in a Motion Picture (Note: Shared with Linda Cardellini, Anna Faris, Anne Hathaway, Heath Ledger, Randy Quaid, and Michelle Williams)	Brokeback Mountain	Nominated	
2014	Outstanding Performance by a Male Actor in a Leading Role	Nightcrawler	Nominated	

=== BAFTA Awards ===
Year	Category	Nominated work	Result	Ref.
British Academy Film Awards
2005	Best Actor in a Supporting Role	Brokeback Mountain	Won	
2014	Best Actor in a Leading Role	Nightcrawler	Nominated	
2016	Best Actor in a Leading Role	Nocturnal Animals	Nominated	

=== Critics' Choice Awards ===
Year	Category	Nominated work	Result	Ref.
Critics' Choice Movie Awards
2005	Best Supporting Actor	Brokeback Mountain	Nominated	
2012	Best Actor in an Action Movie	End of Watch	Nominated	
2014	Best Actor	Nightcrawler	Nominated	
2017	Best Actor	Stronger	Nominated	

=== Emmy Awards ===
Year	Category	Nominated work	Result	Ref.
Primetime Emmy Awards
2025	Outstanding Lead Actor in a Limited Series or Movie	Presumed Innocent	Nominated	

=== Golden Globe Awards ===
Year	Category	Nominated work	Result	Ref.
2010	Best Actor in a Motion Picture – Musical or Comedy	Love & Other Drugs	Nominated	
2014	Best Actor in a Motion Picture – Drama	Nightcrawler	Nominated	
2024	Best Actor – Television Series Drama	Presumed Innocent	Nominated	

=== Tony Awards ===
Year	Category	Nominated work	Result	Ref.
2021	Best Actor in a Play	Sea Wall/A Life	Nominated	
2021	Best Play (as a producer)	Sea Wall/A Life	Nominated	
2021	Best Play (as a producer)	Slave Play	Nominated	

== Miscellaneous awards ==
Association	Year (Note: Indicates the year of ceremony. Each year is linked to the article about the awards held that year, wherever possible.)	Category	Work	Result	Ref.
AACTA International Awards	2015	Best Actor	Nightcrawler	Nominated	
Alliance of Women Film Journalists Awards	2014	Best Actor	Nightcrawler	Nominated	
Austin Film Critics Association Awards	2014	Best Actor	Nightcrawler	Won	
Canadian Screen Awards	2014	Best Performance by an Actor in a Leading Role	Enemy	Nominated	
Chicago Film Critics Association Awards	2006	Best Supporting Actor	Brokeback Mountain	Nominated	
Chicago Film Critics Association Awards	2014	Best Actor	Nightcrawler	Nominated	
Chlotrudis Awards	2003	Best Actor	Donnie Darko	Won	
Dallas–Fort Worth Film Critics Association Awards	2005	Best Supporting Actor	Brokeback Mountain	3rd place	
Dallas–Fort Worth Film Critics Association Awards	2014	Best Actor	Nightcrawler	4th place	
Detroit Film Critics Society Awards	2014	Best Actor	Nightcrawler	Nominated	
Dorian Awards	2015	Best Film Performance – Actor	Nightcrawler	Nominated	
Dubai International Film Festival Awards	2015	International Star of the Year	—N/a	Won	
Dublin Film Critics' Circle Awards	2014	Best Actor	Nightcrawler	Won	
Evening Standard Theatre Awards	2002	Outstanding Newcomer	This Is Our Youth	Won	
Fangoria Chainsaw Awards	2015	Best Actor	Enemy	Nominated	
Florida Film Critics Circle Awards	2014	Best Actor	Nightcrawler	Runner-up	
Georgia Film Critics Association Awards	2014	Best Actor	Nightcrawler	Won	
Gotham Awards	2005	Best Ensemble Cast	Brokeback Mountain	Nominated	
Gotham Awards	2021	Best Feature (Note: Shared with director Natalie Erika James and co-producers Anna Mcleish, Sarah Shaw, and Riva Marker)	Relic	Nominated	
Hollywood Film Awards	2005	Hollywood Breakout Actor Award	Jarhead	Won	
Hollywood Film Awards	2013	Hollywood Supporting Actor Award	Prisoners	Won	
Hollywood Film Awards	2017	Hollywood Actor Award	Stronger	Won	
Houston Film Critics Society Awards	2015	Best Actor	Nightcrawler	Won	
Houston Film Critics Society Awards	2017	Best Actor	Nocturnal Animals	Nominated	
IFTA Film & Drama Awards	2004	Best International Actor	The Day After Tomorrow	Nominated	
IFTA Film & Drama Awards	2015	Best International Actor	Nightcrawler	Nominated	
Independent Spirit Awards	2002	Best Male Lead	Donnie Darko	Nominated	
Independent Spirit Awards	2015	Best First Feature (Note: Shared with director Dan Gilroy and co-producers Jennifer Fox, Tony Gilroy, David Lancaster, and Michel Litvak)	Nightcrawler	Won	
Independent Spirit Awards	2015	Best Male Lead	Nightcrawler	Nominated	
Independent Spirit Awards	2019	Best First Feature (Note: Shared with director Paul Dano and co-producers Andrew Duncan, Riva Marker, Oren Moverman, Ann Ruark, and Alex Saks)	Wildlife	Nominated	
IndieWire Critics Poll Awards	2014	Best Lead Actor	Nightcrawler	Runner-up	
International Cinephile Society Awards	2006	Best Supporting Actor	Brokeback Mountain	Won	
International Cinephile Society Awards	2015	Best Actor	Nightcrawler	Nominated	
Jupiter Awards	2016	Best International Actor	Southpaw	Nominated	
London Film Critics' Circle Awards	2015	Actor of the Year	Nightcrawler	Nominated	
London Film Critics' Circle Awards	2017	Actor of the Year	Nocturnal Animals	Nominated	
MTV Movie & TV Awards	2006	Best Performance	Brokeback Mountain	Won	
MTV Movie & TV Awards	2006	Best Kiss (Note: Shared with Heath Ledger)	Brokeback Mountain	Won	
National Arts Awards	2006	Young Artist Award for Artistic Excellence	—N/a	Won	
National Board of Review Awards	2006	Best Supporting Actor	Brokeback Mountain	Won	
National Board of Review Awards	2013	Best Ensemble (Note: Shared with Maria Bello, Viola Davis, Paul Dano, Terrence Howard, Hugh Jackman, and Melissa Leo)	Prisoners	Won	
Online Film Critics Society Awards	2006	Best Supporting Actor	Brokeback Mountain	Nominated	
Online Film Critics Society Awards	2014	Best Actor	Nightcrawler	Nominated	
Palm Springs International Film Festival Awards	2005	Desert Palm Achievement Award	Brokeback Mountain	Won	
People's Choice Awards	2011	Favorite Action Star	—N/a	Nominated	
People's Choice Awards	2013	Favorite Dramatic Movie Actor	—N/a	Nominated	
San Diego Film Critics Society Awards	2005	Special Award	Jarhead	Won	
San Diego Film Critics Society Awards	2014	Best Actor	Nightcrawler	Won	
San Diego Film Critics Society Awards	2016	Best Actor	Nocturnal Animals	Nominated	
San Francisco Bay Area Film Critics Circle Awards	2014	Best Actor	Nightcrawler	Nominated	
Satellite Awards	2003	Best Supporting Actor in a Motion Picture – Musical or Comedy	The Good Girl	Nominated	
Satellite Awards	2005	Best Supporting Actor in a Motion Picture – Drama	Brokeback Mountain	Nominated	
Satellite Awards	2005	Best Actor in a Motion Picture – Drama	Jarhead	Nominated	
Satellite Awards	2010	Best Actor in a Motion Picture – Musical or Comedy	Love & Other Drugs	Nominated	
Satellite Awards	2014	Best Supporting Actor in a Motion Picture	Prisoners	Nominated	
Satellite Awards	2015	Best Actor in a Motion Picture	Nightcrawler	Nominated	
Satellite Awards	2018	Best Actor in a Motion Picture	Stronger	Nominated	
Saturn Awards	2015	Best Actor	Nightcrawler	Nominated	
Scream Awards	2011	Best Science Fiction Actor	Source Code	Nominated	
St. Louis Film Critics Association Awards	2014	Best Actor	Nightcrawler	Won	
Teen Choice Awards	1999	Choice Movie Breakout Performance	October Sky	Nominated	
Teen Choice Awards	2003	Choice Liplock (Note: Shared with Jennifer Aniston)	The Good Girl	Nominated	
Teen Choice Awards	2003	Choice Movie Breakout Star – Male	The Good Girl	Nominated	
Teen Choice Awards	2007	Choice Movie Actor – Horror/Thriller	Zodiac	Nominated	
Teen Choice Awards	2008	Choice Movie Actor – Drama	Rendition	Nominated	
Teen Choice Awards	2010	Choice Movie Actor – Drama	Brothers	Nominated	
Teen Choice Awards	2010	Choice Movie Actor – Fantasy	Prince of Persia: The Sands of Time	Nominated	
Toronto Film Critics Association Awards	2014	Best Actor (Note: Tied with Ralph Fiennes for The Grand Budapest Hotel (2014))	Nightcrawler	Runner-up	
Vancouver Film Critics Circle Awards	2015	Best Actor in a Canadian Film	Enemy	Nominated	
Vancouver Film Critics Circle Awards	2015	Best Actor	Nightcrawler	Won	
Village Voice Film Poll Awards	2014	Best Actor	Nightcrawler	Won	
Young Artist Awards	2000	Best Leading Young Actor in a Feature Film	October Sky	Nominated	
Young Hollywood Awards	2002	Breakthrough Performance – Actor	Donnie Darko	Won	
YoungStar Awards	1999	Best Performance by a Young Actor in a Drama Film	October Sky	Nominated	
Zurich Film Festival	2017	Golden Eye Award	—N/a	Won	

== See also ==
- Jake Gyllenhaal on screen and stage
