= Carlos Sanz =

American actor

Carlos Sanz (born December 31, 1965) is an American actor. He is best known for playing the main villain, Carlito, in the 2006 film Crank.

== Early life ==
Carlos Sanz is from Chicago. He is a graduate of the University of Illinois Chicago, where he studied mathematics and philosophy.

== Career ==
Carlos Sanz has played roles ranging from the emotionally tormented real-life character Carlos Arredondo, the "hero with the white cowboy hat," who saved the life of Jeff Bauman (Jake Gyllenhaal) in David Gordon Green's film about the Boston Marathon Bombing, Stronger, to the part of a corrupt Costa Rican police captain who beats up Justin Timberlake in Runner Runner, which also stars Ben Affleck and was directed by Brad Furman.

He has also worked with such notable film directors as Ron Howard, Andrew Davis and Alan Rudolph. He played mob boss Manuel Garza in the comedy Beer for My Horses, starring Toby Keith, Rodney Carrington and Willie Nelson. He can be seen in the Lifetime movie Detention, starring alongside Penelope Ann Miller. Sanz played an LA detective in The Take along with John Leguizamo, Tyrese Gibson and Rosie Perez. In the 2006 hit Crank, starring Jason Statham, he played the lead character of Carlito, one of the main antagonists of the film. He can also be seen in the comedy Dishdogz, where he does an homage to Harold Ramis.

Sanz appeared in The Shield as Det. Carlos Zamora and NYPD Blue as Det. Ray Olivo. He also made appearances on episodes of Criminal Minds, 24, Close to Home, and Las Vegas. He played Dr. Victor Rodriguez for two seasons on the NBC daytime drama Another World.

Sanz has worked around the world including the Arena Stage, in a two-person play about Georgia O'Keeffe and her companion. He has also performed at the Goodman Theatre, South Coast Repertory, Royal Shakespeare Company, Thalia Theater, the San Diego Repertory Theatre, and others.

== Filmography ==
=== Film ===
Year	Title	Role	Notes
1989	The Package	Johnny's Field Soldier	
1991	Backdraft	Candidate	
1992	Equinox	Harold	
2000	Mexico City	Lieutenant Menedez	
2003	Scrambled	Hector	
2005	Dishdogz	Miles	
2006	Crank	Carlito	
2007	The Take	Det. Victor Martinez	
2008	Beer for My Horses	Manuel Garza	
2013	Runner Runner	Police Captain	
2016	The Last Bid	Officer Santos	
2017	All About the Money	Felix Santos	
2017	Stronger	Carlos	

=== Television ===
Year	Title	Role	Notes
1992	Law & Order	Javier 'Elvis' Lariano Gaitan	Episode: "Prince of Darkness"
1993–1994	Another World	Victor Rodriguez	16 episodes
1994	New York Undercover	Manuel Torres	Episode: "School Ties"
1994	The Cosby Mysteries	Paul Montero	Episode: "Only You"
1995	The Great Defender	Asst DA Jerry Perez	Episode: "Pilot"
1996	Chicago Hope	Pablo Martinez	Episode: "Sexual Perversity in Chicago Hope"
1997	Pacific Palisades	Ed	Episode: "Desperate Measure"
2000	Walker, Texas Ranger	Ramon Ortega	2 episodes
2001	NYPD Blue	Det. Ray Olivo	2 episodes
2002	JAG	Sergeant Mackerby	Episode: "Odd Man Out"
2002	The Shield	Det. Carlos Zamora	Episode: "Pay in Pain"
2002	Presidio Med	Kevin Fernandez	Episode: "Good Question"
2003	24	Simon Cullens	Episode: "Day 3: 7:00 p.m.-8:00 p.m."
2003	NCIS	Agent Gonzales	Episode: "Marine Down"
2004	Las Vegas	Mendoza	Episode: "My Beautiful Launderette"
2005	Close to Home	Det. Cesario Marquez	Episode: "Suburban Prostitution"
2006	Criminal Minds	Deputy Borquez	Episode: "Machismo"
2008	The Deadliest Lesson	Detective Keillor	Television film
2008, 2009	Terminator: The Sarah Connor Chronicles	Father Armando Bonilla	2 episodes
2009	Numbers	Detective	Episode: "Greatest Hits"
2009	The Forgotten	Restaurant Owner	Episode: "Pilot"
2009	Cold Case	Jose Sandoval	Episode: "Dead Heat"
2009	The Closer	Fernando Soto	Episode: "The Life"
2010	Medium	Man in Suit	Episode: "Dear Dad..."
2010	Castle	Manuel Calderón	Episode: "Anatomy of a Murder"
2011	Supernatural	Virgil	Episode: "The French Mistake"
2011	Burn Notice	Armando Puente	Episode: "Company Man"
2011	CSI: Miami	Geraldo Torres	Episode: "Killer Regrets"
2012	The Mentalist	Detective Dan Silva	Episode: "At First Blush"
2012	Emily Owens, M.D.	Manuel Cuestas	Episode: "Emily and... the Good and the Bad"
2013	The Fosters	Ernie Rivera	3 episodes
2014	Intelligence	Hector Villareal	Episode: "The Rescue"
2014	Review	Carlos	Episode: "Best Friend; Space"
2014	Scorpion	Commander	Episode: "A Cyclone"
2014–2017	NCIS: Los Angeles	DEA Agent Mario Sanchez	3 episodes
2015	Bones	Julian Molina	Episode: "The Doom in the Boom"
2016	Notorious	Eduardo Nogales	Episode: "Choice"
2017	Grimm	El Cuegle	Episode: "El Cuegle"
2017	Unit Zero	Asset 3145	Television film
2017	Ten Days in the Valley	Chistopher Gomez	5 episodes
2017, 2018	Queen of the South	El Dentista	2 episodes
2018	9-1-1	Detective Anderson	Episode: "Heartbreaker"
2018	Arrow	Dragos	2 episodes
2018	Magnum P.I.	Carl Nadella	Episode: "The Cat Who Cried Wolf"
2019	The Oath	Ignacio Velasquez	5 episodes
2020	Dashing in December	Carlos Casas	Television film
2021	Yellowjackets	Coach Martinez	2 episodes
