= Jake Gyllenhaal on screen and stage =

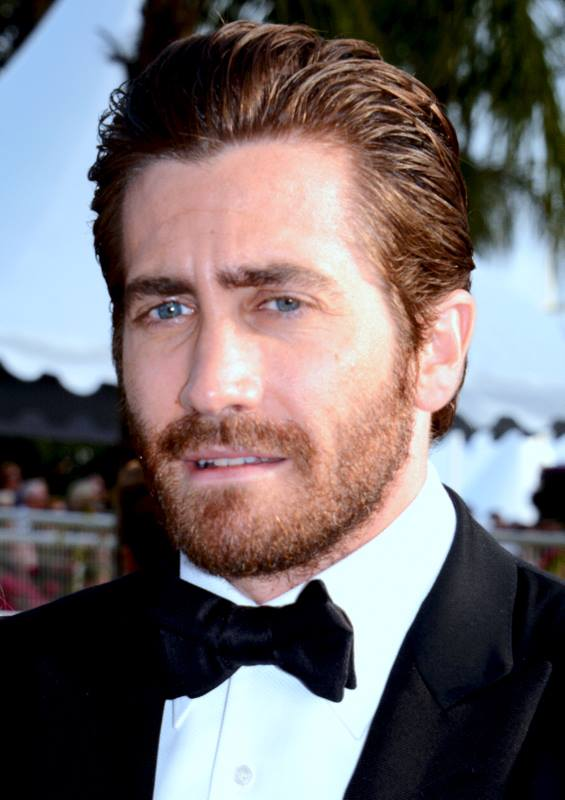
Gyllenhaal at the 2015 Cannes Film Festival

Jake Gyllenhaal is an American actor who has appeared in over 50 motion pictures (including some yet to be released), three television programs, one commercial, and four music videos. He made his film debut in 1991 with a minor role in the comedy-drama City Slickers. In 1993, he appeared in A Dangerous Woman, a motion picture adaptation directed by Gyllenhaal's father Stephen Gyllenhaal and co-written by his mother Naomi Foner Gyllenhaal that was based on the novel of the same name by Mary McGarry Morris. In the following year, he portrayed Robin Williams' son in an episode of the police procedural television series Homicide: Life on the Street; the episode was directed by his father. In 1999, Gyllenhaal starred in the Joe Johnston-directed drama October Sky; the film was received warmly by critics, and Gyllenhaal's portrayal of the NASA engineer Homer Hickam was praised.

In 2001, he appeared in the comedy film Bubble Boy, which was a critical failure and a box-office bomb but has since gone on to attain status as a "cult comedy". Later that same year, he starred in the Richard Kelly-directed psychological thriller Donnie Darko alongside his sister Maggie, and Drew Barrymore. His portrayal of the Donnie Darko character, a "sullen" and "schizophrenic" teenager, made him a cult hero. Although the film was critically acclaimed, it failed commercially. Gyllenhaal starred in the 2004 disaster film The Day After Tomorrow, which, despite receiving mixed reviews from critics, was a commercial success at the box office. In 2005, he co-starred as Jack Twist opposite Heath Ledger in the romance drama Brokeback Mountain. The actors portrayed two men that fall in love during a sheepherding expedition. The roles earned both Gyllenhaal and Ledger critical acclaim and Academy Award nominations. That same year, he starred in the drama films Jarhead and Proof.

Gyllenhaal played the true crime author Robert Graysmith in the 2007 mystery film Zodiac. Directed by David Fincher, the film explores the story about the serial killer Zodiac who stalked the Bay Area during the late 1960s and early 1970s. In 2010, he portrayed Prince Dastan in the fantasy adventure Prince of Persia: The Sands of Time; the film received mixed reviews from critics and was a box office success. That same year, Gyllenhaal starred alongside Anne Hathaway in the romantic comedy Love & Other Drugs. He portrayed Colter Stevens, a U.S. Army Aviation captain, in the 2011 sci-fi time-travel thriller Source Code. In 2013, Gyllenhaal starred in the drama Prisoners together with Hugh Jackman; the film received both critical and commercial success. The following year, he starred in dual roles in Enemy. He then produced and starred in Nightcrawler (2014) and was nominated as Lead Actor for the BAFTA Award, Actor Award, Golden Globe Award and Critics' Choice Movie Award, with his miss in the Best Actor Oscar category considered by many to be a snub. (Note: Attributed to multiple sources.) In 2019, Gyllenhaal played Marvel Comics character Mysterio in Spider-Man: Far From Home, set within the Marvel Cinematic Universe.

== Films ==
Key
†	Denotes films that have not yet been released

Year	Title	Role	Notes	Ref.			
Year	Title	Role	Notes	Ref.	1991	City Slickers	Daniel Robbins
1993	A Dangerous Woman	Edward					
1993	Josh and S.A.M.	Leon Coleman					
1998	Homegrown	Jake / Blue Kahan					
1999	October Sky	Homer Hickam					
2001	Donnie Darko	Donnie Darko					
2001	Bubble Boy	Jimmy Livingston					
2001	Lovely and Amazing	Jordan					
2002	The Good Girl	Thomas "Holden" Worther					
2002	Highway	Pilot Kelson					
2002	Moonlight Mile	Joe Nast					
2003	Abby Singer	Himself	Cameo appearance				
2004	The Day After Tomorrow	Sam Hall					
2004	Jiminy Glick in Lalawood	Himself	Cameo				
2005	The Man Who Walked Between the Towers	Narrator	Voice; Documentary				
2005	Brokeback Mountain	Jack Twist					
2005	Proof	Harold "Hal" Dobbs					
2005	Jarhead	Anthony "Swoff" Swofford					
2007	Zodiac	Robert Graysmith					
2007	Rendition	Douglas Freeman					
2009	Brothers	Tommy Cahill					
2010	Prince of Persia: The Sands of Time	Dastan					
2010	Love & Other Drugs	Jamie Randall					
2011	Source Code	Colter Stevens					
2012	End of Watch	Brian Taylor	Also executive producer				
2013	Prisoners	Detective Loki					
2013	Enemy	Adam Bell / Anthony Clair					
2014	Nightcrawler	Louis "Lou" Bloom	Also producer				
2015	Accidental Love	Howard Birdwell					
2015	Southpaw	Billy Hope					
2015	Everest	Scott Fischer					
2015	Demolition	Davis Mitchell					
2016	Nocturnal Animals	Edward Sheffield / Tony Hastings					
2017	Life	Dr. David Jordan					
2017	Okja	Dr. Johnny Wilcox					
2017	Stronger	Jeff Bauman	Also producer				
2018	Wildlife	Jerry Brinson	Also producer				
2018	The Sisters Brothers	John Morris					
2019	Velvet Buzzsaw	Morf Vandewalt					
2019	Spider-Man: Far From Home	Quentin Beck / Mysterio					
2021	Spirit Untamed	James "Jim" Prescott	Voice				
2021	The Guilty	Joe Baylor	Also producer				
2021	Spider-Man: No Way Home	Quentin Beck / Mysterio	Archive footage				
2022	Ambulance	Daniel "Danny" Sharp					
2022	Strange World	Searcher Clade	Voice				
2023	Guy Ritchie's The Covenant	Sergeant John Kinley					
2024	Road House	Elwood Dalton					
2026	The Bride!	Ronnie Reed					
2026	In the Grey	Bronco Beauregard					
2026	Remain	Tate Gordon					
TBA	Road House 2 †	Elwood Dalton	Post-production; Also producer				
TBA	Honeymoon with Harry †	Todd	Post-production				

=== As producer only ===
Year	Title	Credited as	Notes	Ref.			
Year	Title	2017	Notes	Ref.	Hondros	Executive	Documentary
2020	Relic	Yes					
2020	The Devil All the Time	Yes					
2020	Joe Bell	Executive					
2021	Breaking News in Yuba County	Yes					

== Television ==
Year	Title	Role	Notes	Ref.
1994	Homicide: Life on the Street	Matthew "Matt" Ellison	Episode: "Bop Gun"	
2007–2024	Saturday Night Live	Himself (host)	3 episodes	
2009	Sesame Street	Himself	Episode: "The Rainbow Show"	
2011	Man vs. Wild	Himself	Episode 68	
2016	Inside Amy Schumer	Himself	Episode: "Fame"	
2019–2022	The Daily Bugle	Quentin Beck / Mysterio	Web series	
2019	John Mulaney & the Sack Lunch Bunch	Mr. Music	Children's special	
2020	Saturday Night Live	Guy Who Travels in Pyjamas	Episode: "John Mulaney/David Byrne"	
2024	Presumed Innocent	Rusty Sabich	Lead role; also executive producer	

== Theater ==
Year	Title	Role	Venue	Notes	Ref.
2002	This Is Our Youth	Warren Straub	Garrick Theatre	West End	
2012	If There Is I Haven't Found It Yet	Terry	Laura Pels Theater	Off-Broadway	
2014–2015	Constellations	Roland	Samuel J. Friedman Theatre	Broadway	
2015	Little Shop of Horrors	Seymour Krelborn	New York City Center	Off-Broadway	
2016	Sunday in the Park with George	Georges Seurat / George	New York City Center	Off-Broadway	
2017	Sunday in the Park with George	Georges Seurat / George	Hudson Theatre	Broadway	
2019	Sea Wall/A Life	Abe	The Public Theater	Off-Broadway	
2019	Sea Wall/A Life	Abe	Hudson Theatre	Broadway	
2023	Gutenberg! The Musical!	The Guest Producer (one night cameo)	James Earl Jones Theatre	Broadway	
2025	Othello	Iago	Ethel Barrymore Theatre	Broadway	

== Music videos ==
Year	Song	Artist(s)	Role	Ref.
2009	"Blame It"	Jamie Foxx (feat. T-Pain)	Clubber	
2010	"Giving Up the Gun"	Vampire Weekend	Tennis player	
2012	"Time to Dance"	The Shoes	Jason Voorhees	
2014	"Part II (On the Run)"	Jay-Z (feat. Beyoncé)	Himself	

== See also ==
- List of awards and nominations received by Jake Gyllenhaal
