= Trial of Dzhokhar Tsarnaev =

2015 federal trial of the surviving Boston Marathon bomber

United States v. Tsarnaev
- Seal of the United States District Court for the District of Massachusetts
- Court: United States District Court for the District of Massachusetts
- Full case name: United States of America v. Dzhokhar A. Tsarnaev a/k/a Jahar Tsarni
- Decided: April 8, 2015
- Verdict: Found guilty on all 30 charges; Dzhokhar Tsarnaev was sentenced to death on June 24, 2015. (Six counts)

Case history
- Appealed to: United States Court of Appeals for the First Circuit
- Subsequent actions: All of Tsarnaev's death sentence charges overturned on July 31st, 2020; remanded case back for a new trial for sentencing on the remaining charges The Supreme Court reversed the decision of the First Circuit Court of Appeals to vacate the death sentence on March 4th, 2022

Court membership
- Judges sitting: George O' Toole (initial trials); Juan R. Torruella, O. Rogeriee Thompson, William J. Kayatta Jr. (Appeal)

The trial of Dzhokhar Tsarnaev for the Boston Marathon bombing on April 15, 2013, began on March 4, 2015, in front of the US District Court for the District of Massachusetts, nearly two years after the pre-trial hearings. Dzhokhar Tsarnaev's attorney, Judy Clarke, opened by telling the jurors that her client and his older brother, Tamerlan Tsarnaev, planted a bomb killing three and injuring hundreds, as well as murdering an MIT police officer days later. In her 20-minute opening statement, Clarke said: "There's little that occurred the week of April the 15th ... that we dispute." Dzhokhar Tsarnaev was found guilty on all 30 counts and has been sentenced to death by lethal injection for his crimes.

== Pre-trial events ==
Tsarnaev's arraignment for 30 charges, including four for murder, occurred on July 10, 2013, in the US District Court for the District of Massachusetts in Boston before U.S. Magistrate Judge Marianne Bowler. It was his first public court appearance. He pleaded not guilty to all 30 counts against him, which included using and conspiring to use a weapon of mass destruction resulting in death. Tsarnaev was represented by Miriam Conrad, David Bruck, William Fick, Timothy G. Watkins, and Judy Clarke.

On January 30, 2014, United States Attorney General Eric Holder announced that the federal government would seek the death penalty against Dzhokhar Tsarnaev. A plea deal failed when the government refused to rule out the possibility of the death penalty. The proceedings were overseen by Judge George O'Toole. Jury selection lasted two months.

After his detention, Tsarnaev was questioned without being provided a Miranda warning. After being read his Miranda rights, Tsarnaev stopped talking and declined to continue to cooperate with the investigation. Prosecutors initially argued that his pre-Miranda statements should be admissible, invoking Miranda's public safety exception. However, the exception was not considered by the court because the prosecutors later decided not to use those statements in their case.

== Opening statements ==
Opening statements took place on March 4, 2015. Assistant US Attorney William Weinreb opened for the prosecution. "He pretended to be a spectator, but he had murder in his heart," Weinreb said.

Weinreb gave graphic details of the aftermath, while some of the victims' family members were in the courtroom listening. Weinreb said eight-year-old Martin Richard "bled to death on the sidewalk", Lü Lingzi (Chinese: 吕令子), had the "inside of her stomach pouring out", and Krystle Campbell was left with "gaping holes" in her body. It was revealed on the first day that Tsarnaev stood on Boylston Street for four minutes before placing a backpack with a bomb in it on the ground. After planting the bombs, Tsarnaev went shopping for milk at a Whole Foods Market after the bombings as if "nothing had happened".

Jurors also learned that Stephen Silva, a friend of Tsarnaev's, gave the 9mm Ruger pistol that killed MIT police officer Sean Collier while the Tsarnaevs attempted to escape. Collier was shot twice in the side of the head, once between the eyes, and three times in the right hand. A graduate student saw the Tsarnaevs standing by the police cruiser Collier was sitting in, and another person heard the gunshots.

Prosecutors contended that the Tsarnaev brothers were inspired by Al-Qaeda, and it was by reading Inspire, an Al-Qaeda-sponsored online publication, that they learned to construct the pressure cooker bombs used. It was also learned that Tamerlan died when Dzhokhar ran over him while attempting to escape from a shootout with police in Watertown. In admitting to the crimes, Clarke said that "the circumstances that bring us here today still are difficult to grasp, they are incomprehensible, they are inexcusable", but tried to say that Dzhokhar acted under the influence of Tamerlan.

== Marathon victims and witnesses ==
On the second day of the trial, March 5, seven witnesses testified about what they saw before, during, and after the blasts. The testimony of Bill Richard, Martin's father, caused several in the courtroom to cry, including at least one juror. Iraq war veteran and Boston police officer Frank Chioloa, testified about the last moments of Krystle Marie Campbell, and fellow officer Lauren Woods did the same about Lu Lingzi. Woods refused an order to leave Lu's side after she died. Also Boston Police Captain Frank Armstrong and Massachusetts State Police patrolmen Frannie Deary, Paul Downey, Bill Zubrin, and Jimmy Scopa testified about standing over Martin's body for 12 hours after the bombing.

Jeff Bauman, a victim who lost both legs, appeared in court wearing shorts. A photo of him being pushed in a wheelchair by "the man in the Cowboy hat," Carlos Arredondo, was widely circulated after the blasts. He testified that he noticed an uncomfortable Tamerlan leaving a backpack on the ground moments before it exploded.

By the third day of testimony, March 9, jurors had heard from 27 witnesses who were either injured in the explosions, or who attempted to help those who were. Jurors also saw a compilation of security camera videos that show the Tsarnaev brothers approach the finish line, place the bombs on the ground, and then walk away. It was also revealed that Tsarnaev had a secret Twitter account with which he posted extremist Islamic material.

James Hooley, head of Boston Emergency Medical Services, testified ambulances brought 118 victims to hospitals. Police vehicles were also used to transport victims, and every available Boston Police resource was brought to the scene, according to Boston police Superintendent-in-Chief William Gross. Gross told the jurors that public transportation to the area was suspended and the police swept for other explosives. A police commander screamed into the radio to "Stop the race; give me everything you have to Boylston Street!" The area was cleared of spectators, runners, and other victims within 22 minutes.

Jurors also saw video of Tsarnaev 20 minutes after the explosions, pondering which type of milk to buy, and another of him in the UMass gym later that evening.

== Collier murder and carjacking ==
On the fourth day of the trial, a note scrawled by Tsarnaev in the boat where he was hiding out was shown to jurors. Tsarnaev was found hiding in a fetal position by the boat's owner, David Henneberry. He said he was jealous of his brother who had received Jannutul Firdaus, or the highest paradise, and asked God to make him a shaheed. Jurors saw the boat in person on the seventh day of the trial.

The murder of Sean Collier was the primary focus of the fifth day of the trial. Collier was found alive but possibly unconscious, and making a gurgling noise. He was shot three times in the head, including once between the eyes, and three times in the hand. At least one bullet was fired with the muzzle pressed against his skin. Both he and his car were covered in blood after he was shot when the Tsarnaev brothers tried to steal his gun.

On the trial's sixth day, Dun Meng (孟盾) described being carjacked by the Tsarnaev brothers and being forced to drive for 90 minutes before escaping.

== Gun battle in Watertown ==
The seventh day of the trial brought discussion of the gun battle between police and the Tsarnaev brothers in Watertown, Massachusetts. Tamerlan was trading shots with Watertown Sergeant Jeffrey Pugliese when the officer's gun ran out of ammunition and Tamerlan's jammed. They then wrestled on the ground, when Dzhokhar sped past them in a stolen SUV close enough that Pugliese could feel the wind on his face. Tamerlan was hit by the car, and dragged for 30 feet, killing him.

Police from the Massachusetts Bay Transportation Authority Police also took part in the battle. Richard Donohue, an MBTA officer, was shot during the firefight and nearly died. The brothers also threw bombs at the officers.

Jurors learned that the Tsarnaev brothers received the gun they used in their escape attempt from Stephen Silva, a childhood friend of Dzhokhar. While he was on the stand prosecutors attempted to "portray Tsarnaev as a secret jihadist with murderous plans, a depraved criminal worthy of the death penalty" while the defense team tried to portray Tamerlan as the dominant figure and Dzhokhar as subservient to him. The two friends were both drug dealers, according to Silva, who was facing drug and gun charges of his own.

== Sentencing ==
=== By the jury ===
On April 8, 2015, Tsarnaev was found guilty on all thirty counts of the indictment. The charges of usage of a weapon of mass destruction resulting in death, in addition to aiding and abetting, made Tsarnaev eligible for the death penalty.

Bill and Denise Richard, parents of the youngest of the three killed in the bombings, urged against a death sentence for Tsarnaev. They stated that the lengthy appeals period would force them to relive that day continually, and would rather see him spend life in prison without possibility of release or parole.

Tsarnaev, who had been largely emotionless throughout his trial, appeared to weep when his relatives testified on May 4, 2015, during the sentencing phase of the trial. The defense characterized life in prison as a harsh punishment, and did not try to convince the jury that Dzohkhar's actions deserved anything less. The prosecution argued that death by lethal injection was a more appropriate punishment. On May 15, 2015, the jury recommended that Tsarnaev be sentenced to death by lethal injection on six counts of the indictment. The death sentence counts were related to the setting of the second bomb, which killed Lu and Richard. The counts related to the deaths of Campbell and Collier did not result in death sentences; the jury believed that Tamerlan Tsarnaev had responsibility for the first bomb, which killed Campbell.

=== By the judge ===
O'Toole formally handed down the death sentence on June 24, 2015. Victims and family members had the opportunity to make statements beforehand, although the judge was required to deliver the jury's death verdict. "He chose to do nothing to prevent all of this from happening. He chose hate. He chose destruction. He chose death," Bill Richard said. "We choose love. We choose kindness. We choose peace. This is our response to hate. That's what makes us different from him."

Speaking for the first time, Tsarnaev apologized to the victims and the survivors. "I am Muslim. My religion is Islam. I pray to Allah to bestow his mercy on those affected in the bombing and their families," he said. "I pray for your healing ... I ask Allah to have mercy on me, my brother and my family."

After officially ordering that Tsarnaev be executed, O'Toole told him, "No one will remember that your teachers were fond of you, that you were funny, a good athlete ... Whenever your name is mentioned, what will be remembered is the evil you have done .... What will be remembered is that you murdered and maimed ... It was a monstrous self-deception. You had to forget your own humanity. The common humanity you shared with your brother Tamerlan."

Several months later, Judge O'Toole ordered Tsarnaev to pay $101,125,027 to the victims and the Massachusetts Victim Compensation Fund.

== Appeals ==
In December 2018 Tsarnaev's lawyers filed an appeal on several grounds, including the argument that the judge erred by allowing jurors to be seated who were potentially biased by media coverage. The appeal was upheld by the United States Court of Appeals for the First Circuit on July 31, 2020, reversing three relatively minor weapons convictions and vacating the death sentence, and a new sentencing trial was ordered for the overturned charges. The remaining convictions still carried multiple life sentences that would keep Tsarnaev in prison regardless of the fate of the new penalty trial.

The federal government filed a petition for writ of certiorari with the United States Supreme Court in October 2020 and the court granted certiorari on March 22, 2021. The case was argued on October 13, 2021, as United States v. Tsarnaev. On March 4, 2022, the death sentence was upheld by the Supreme Court.

On April 7, 2022, Tsarnaev's attorneys filed a stay of execution and appeal to consider four constitutional claims in his case with the 1st Circuit Court of Appeals, which included that the US District Court in Boston improperly forced him to stand trial in the city, accusations about the jury and the admittance of evidence that had been collected after a "coerced confession". The day prior, the 1st circuit had complied with the Supreme Court's decision from March 2022.
