= Hollywood Film Award for Best Actor =

Former annual US film award

The Hollywood Actor Award is a category of the Hollywood Film Awards held annually since 1999.

Year	Winner	Film(s)	Role
1999	Jackie Chan		
2000	Russell Crowe	The Insider	Jeffrey Wigand
2001	Ewan McGregor	Black Hawk Down / Moulin Rouge!	SPC John "Grimesey" Grimes / Christian
2002	Tom Hanks		
2003	Johnny Depp	Pirates of the Caribbean: The Curse of the Black Pearl	Captain Jack Sparrow
2004	Leonardo DiCaprio	The Aviator	Howard Hughes
2005	Joaquin Phoenix	Walk the Line	Johnny Cash
2006	Forest Whitaker	The Last King of Scotland	Idi Amin
2007	Richard Gere		
2008	Josh Brolin	W.	President George W. Bush
2009	Robert De Niro	Everybody's Fine	Frank Goode
2010	Robert Duvall	Get Low	Felix Bush
2011	George Clooney	The Descendants	Matthew King
2012	Bradley Cooper	Silver Linings Playbook	Patrizio "Pat" Solitano, Jr.
2013	Matthew McConaughey	Dallas Buyers Club	Ron Woodroof
2014	Benedict Cumberbatch	The Imitation Game	Alan Turing
2015	Will Smith	Concussion	Bennet Omalu
2016	Tom Hanks	Sully	Chesley "Sully" Sullenberger
2017	Jake Gyllenhaal	Stronger	Jeff Bauman
2018	Hugh Jackman	The Front Runner	Gary Hart
2019	Antonio Banderas	Pain and Glory	Salvador Mallo
