= Blood and Money =

2020 film directed by John Barr

- Film poster
- Directed by: John Barr
- Screenplay by: John Barr; Mike McGrale; Alan Petherick
- Produced by: Suza Horvat
- Starring: Tom Berenger
- Cinematography: John Barr
- Edited by: Roger Cropley
- Music by: Zak McNeil
- Production company: Allagash
- Distributed by: Screen Media Films
- Release date: May 15, 2020
- Running time: 89 minutes
- Country: United States
- Language: English
- Budget: $475,000

Blood and Money (formerly titled Allagash) is a 2020 American thriller film directed by John Barr and starring Tom Berenger. It is Barr's feature directorial debut.

== Plot ==
Jim Reed is a depressed and tired of life old man living in an RV near the woods of Maine during the winter. He is a former Marine who served in the Vietnam War and a recovering alcoholic, being a year sober. Jim is divorced and his ex-wife is now dead, while his daughter died in a freak accident at a young age, which Jim is thought to have caused due to drunk driving. He is also estranged from his son. Jim hates himself and suffers from guilt over his daughter's death. One afternoon, while changing a tire, he begins to spit up blood and passes out, indicating he may have cancer. Jim hunts "game" (deer) for meat, and goes into town for his other supplies. Having few relationships, he eats breakfast regularly at a diner where he shares a friendship with Debbie, a waitress and working class mother unhappy with her marriage and general life. One night, after going to the local bar and considering drinking, he goes to the VFW's A.A. meeting, where he meets George, an Iraq war veteran and, as Jim finds out, Debbie's husband.

One evening, while hunting, Jim shoots what he thinks is a deer, but discovers that he's accidentally shot a young woman who says to Jim "you're a dead man" before dying. Panicked, he flees the woods and goes to the town's bar, where he orders shots of whiskey, then yells at the bartender when she jokes about him falling "off the wagon." Watching the television, he discovers that the woman was part of a five-person crew that robbed $1.2 million from a casino and viciously killed three security guards and injuring twelve civilians. Realizing he left a cigarette butt near the dead woman's body, he hurries out back into the woods.

Jim gets the cigarette butt and takes the bag of money that is near the dead woman's body. He soon runs into George, who is hunting game. Jim tries to convince George to turn back, but George refuses. The other four members from the robbery crew are near at hand, armed with semi-automatic rifles. They search the dead woman's body, but not finding the money now notice that Jim and George are fleeing. George is shot in the leg. While hiding behind some trees, Jim watches helplessly as George is executed as knowing nothing about the money, cannot tell them where it is. Jim hides, moving again during dusk. He hides the money in a cave. He returns to his RV, only to find that the robbers have set it ablaze. He is shot in the shoulder and barely escapes. Jim finds a logging site and rests for the night in the office. The next day, he leaves a note for the foreman, but is tracked to the office by one of the robbers who he kills with his revolver. He finds another robber and fights him, knocking him unconscious into the river, but falling in briefly himself.

Jim spends the night in the cave, burning some of the money to keep warm and dry. He wakes up the next morning and tries to start another fire, only to discover that the lighter doesn't work. He finds Debbie's car on the road, but it won't start. Venturing further, he stumbles upon the last two robbers: a father and son. The father heads out to find Jim, but the son stays at the vehicle to urinate. Jim ambushes him and shoots him with his revolver, which causes the young man's semiautomatic to shoot and disable the pickup truck. The young man lets Jim know that the girl Jim accidentally shot was his girlfriend, and despite his plea of "being even" with Jim, Jim kills him with the revolver. Jim takes the robber's semiautomatic, but again finds that the gun has been emptied while shooting.

Without any further bullets for his revolver, Jim tracks the father and calls him out. The father captures Jim, forcing him to take him to the money at gunpoint. The father taunts Jim about his daughter's death and his divorce, and threatens to kill Jim's son after he gets the money from Jim. Jim responds by telling the father that he killed his son. The father goes into a fit of rage. As he goes to shoot Jim, Jim spits up blood into his face, and uses the distraction to tackle the man and push them both off a steep hill. The fall leaves the father incapacitated, having broken an arm and a leg. Barely alive, Jim gets up and starts walking, but he has been severely wounded from the combination of the fall and blood loss after being shot two days earlier. Jim accepts his fate, and lies peacefully on the ground. A heavy snow starts to fall, which will bury both men.

The next day, the manager at the logging site finds Jim's note at the office and drives to town, leaving it at the restaurant where Debbie works. When Debbie starts reading and sees that Jim sketched a map for her to find the cave where the money bag is hidden (together with the line "this is for you and for your kids") she apparently believes it to be a prank or otherwise worthless, so she rips it in half and throws it away. Seconds later, she comes back and recovers it from the trash can.

== Cast ==
- Tom Berenger as Jim Reed
- Kristen Hager as Debbie Thibault
- Jimmy LeBlanc as George Thibault

== Release ==
Screen Media Films acquired the North American distribution rights to the film in March 2020.

The film was released on VOD & Theaters on May 15, 2020.

== Reception ==
The film has a 39% rating on Rotten Tomatoes. The site's critical consensus reads, "Blood and Money gives Tom Berenger a too-rare opportunity to take the spotlight -- along with a middling script that falls back too often on action movie clichés." Jeffrey M. Anderson of Common Sense Media awarded the film two stars out of five. Odie Henderson of RogerEbert.com awarded it two and a half stars.

John DeFore of The Hollywood Reporter gave the film a positive review, calling it "a welcome vehicle for its star, who has been underused by filmmakers for decades."
