= Jimmy LeBlanc =

American actor

James LeBlanc
- Occupation: Actor
- Years active: 2007–present

James LeBlanc is an American actor from South Boston.

== Biography ==
LeBlanc grew up in South Boston, and was educated at St. Augustine's and Matignon High School in Cambridge. He has worked as a boxer and sheet metal worker.

== Selected filmography ==
- Gone Baby Gone as Chris Mullen (2007)
- Spotlight as Patrick McSorley (2015)
- Stronger as Larry (2017)
- Blood and Money as George (2020)
- Boston Strangler as Officer Dougan (2023)
