= Stronger (film) =

2017 film directed by David Gordon Green

- Theatrical release poster
- Directed by: David Gordon Green
- Screenplay by: John Pollono
- Based on: Stronger by Jeff Bauman; Bret Witter
- Produced by: Jake Gyllenhaal; Michel Litvak; Scott Silver; Todd Lieberman; David Hoberman
- Starring: Jake Gyllenhaal; Tatiana Maslany; Miranda Richardson; Clancy Brown
- Cinematography: Sean Bobbitt
- Edited by: Dylan Tichenor
- Music by: Michael Brook
- Production companies: Bold Films; Mandeville Films; Nine Stories Productions
- Distributed by: Lionsgate; Roadside Attractions
- Release dates: September 8, 2017 (TIFF); September 22, 2017 (United States)
- Running time: 119 minutes
- Country: United States
- Language: English
- Budget: $30 million
- Box office: $8.5 million

Stronger is a 2017 American biographical drama film directed by David Gordon Green and written by John Pollono, based on the memoir Stronger by Jeff Bauman and Bret Witter. Jake Gyllenhaal stars as Bauman, who loses both his legs in the Boston Marathon bombing and must adjust to his new life. Tatiana Maslany, Miranda Richardson, Carlos Sanz, and Clancy Brown appear in supporting roles.

Stronger had its world premiere at the 2017 Toronto International Film Festival on September 8, 2017, and was theatrically released in the United States on September 22, 2017 by Lionsgate and Roadside Attractions. It received positive reviews from critics, who praised the mature take on the story and Gyllenhaal's performance, but was a box-office flop, grossing just $8 million against its $30 million budget.

== Plot ==
Jeff Bauman is a well-intentioned but underachieving Boston native who works at the deli counter of a Costco and lives in a small two-bedroom apartment with his alcoholic mother, Patty. One day at the local bar, Jeff runs into his ex-girlfriend Erin, who is attracted to his kindness and charm, but finds herself constantly frustrated by his lack of commitment. After learning that Erin is running in the 2013 Boston Marathon to raise money for the hospital she works at, Jeff asks every patron in the bar to donate and then promises Erin he'll wait at the finish line for her with a big sign.

The day of the Marathon, Jeff scrambles to make it to the finish line on time, but reaches it before Erin does. As she approaches the finish line, a bomb goes off right where Jeff is standing. After being rushed to a hospital, both of Jeff's legs are amputated above the knee. When he regains consciousness, Jeff tells his brother that he saw the bomber before the explosion. Patty calls the FBI, where Jeff is able to give them a description of Tamerlan Tsarnaev. Local authorities capture Dzhokhar Tsarnaev days later, and Jeff is hailed as a hero.

Jeff struggles to adjust to his condition, as well as his newfound fame. Patty books several interviews and constantly surrounds Jeff with news reporters during his rehab sessions, to which Erin, who has since rekindled her relationship with Jeff, objects. Jeff and his family are invited by the Boston Bruins to Game 2 of the first round of the Stanley Cup Playoffs against the Chicago Blackhawks. The Bruins organization asks Jeff to wave the flag during the game's opening ceremony. The crowd at TD Garden triggers traumatic flashbacks for Jeff, and he breaks down in the elevator. Erin comforts him and insists he talk to his family about the fragility of his mental state and the impact his newfound exposure is having on it. Later that night, they make love for the first time since his injury.

Patty books Jeff an interview with Oprah Winfrey without telling him, causing Erin to speak up and tell Patty that the constant media attention is intensifying Jeff's PTSD. After an argument between Patty and Erin, Jeff finally admits that he doesn't want to do any more interviews. A disheartened Patty tells him that she only wishes for the world to see how amazing her son is. She soon begins enabling Jeff's worst tendencies, including his laziness and affinity for drinking. He begins missing physical therapy appointments due to long nights of drinking, usually with Patty. Erin, who has since moved in, finds Patty blacked out on the couch and an unconscious Jeff in a bathtub, covered in feces. The next day, she snaps at Patty for her selfishness and negligence before calling Jeff out for his self-pity and refusal to stand up to his mother. Erin storms off, leaving Jeff and Patty to drive home alone.

That night, Jeff blows off Erin to drink with his brothers at a bar. Two patrons at the bar begin asking Jeff questions about the bombing, insinuating that the event was a government conspiracy to start a war in Iran and Jeff was paid to look like a victim. Insulted, Jeff and his brothers initiate a bar fight with the patrons. Erin picks him up later that night and tells him that she's pregnant. Agitated and enraged, Jeff panics and rants at her that he isn't ready to be a father, causing Erin to accuse him of constantly running away from his problems. Heartbroken, she leaves him in the car without removing his wheelchair from the trunk, enters their apartment, and packs her things. Jeff crawls to the apartment door and has a PTSD flashback of the bombing in its entirety.

Jeff meets with Carlos, a man who cared for him in the immediate aftermath of the bombing, saving his life. Carlos tells him about his son, a Marine who died in the Iraq War. After attempting suicide, Carlos was forced to attend his son's funeral on a stretcher. His younger son, unable to cope with the death of his older brother and the constant state of pain his father was in, killed himself. Carlos confides that saving Jeff helped him make peace with the death of his sons and the blame he placed upon himself because of them. Jeff begins to understand that his will to live in the face of adversity is what both comforts and inspires people. He stops drinking and begins to take his rehab more seriously. He leaves Erin a voicemail apologizing for his behavior, finally taking full responsibility for his immaturity and fear of commitment. A few days later, he and Carlos throw out the first pitch for a Boston Red Sox game at Fenway Park, where he meets Pedro Martinez. Erin watches at home and smiles. After the game, dozens of people come up to Jeff and tell him how and why he has so heavily impacted their lives.

Patty drops off Jeff for a date with Erin at a diner, where he walks with his prosthetics for the first time without assistance. He tells Erin he loves her, to which she replies, "Good." He grabs her hand and smiles.

== Cast ==
- Jake Gyllenhaal as Jeff Bauman, Jeff Sr. and Patty's son and Erin's boyfriend.
- Tatiana Maslany as Erin Hurley, Jeff's girlfriend and Gail's sister.
- Miranda Richardson as Patty Bauman, Jeff's mother and Jeff Sr.'s wife.
- Clancy Brown as Jeff Bauman Sr., Jeff's father and Patty's husband.
- Carlos Sanz as Carlos Arredondo
- Frankie Shaw as Gail Hurley, Erin's sister.
- Danny McCarthy as Kevin
- Lenny Clarke as Uncle Bob
- Richard Lane Jr. as Sully
- Jimmy LeBlanc as Larry
- Jessica Lundy as FBI Agent Sarah
- Patty O'Neil as Aunt Jenn
- Cassandra Cato-Louis as Maya

== Production ==
On July 14, 2014, it was reported that Lionsgate was developing a film based on Jeff Bauman's memoir Stronger, with playwright John Pollono writing the script. On July 17, 2015, David Gordon Green signed on to direct the film. On July 29, 2015, it was reported that Jake Gyllenhaal was in talks to play Bauman, and on October 7, 2015, it was reported that Tatiana Maslany was in talks to play Bauman's girlfriend Erin Hurley. On February 2, 2016, Bold Films signed on to produce and finance the film. On April 5, 2016, Miranda Richardson and Clancy Brown joined the film, as Bauman's mother and father, respectively. The same month, Frankie Shaw joined the cast. Filming began in Greater Boston (including the city of Boston) and New York City on April 4, 2016.

== Reception ==
=== Box office ===
Stronger grossed $4.2 million in the United States and Canada, and $3.5 million in other territories, for a worldwide total of $7.7 million.

Stronger was released on September 22, 2017, by Lionsgate and Roadside Attractions. The film debuted in 574 theaters and grossed $1.6 million in its opening weekend, finishing 8th at the box office. In its second weekend, despite being added to 72 theaters, the film dropped 38% to $986,560 and 13th place.

=== Critical response ===
On review aggregator Rotten Tomatoes, the film has an approval rating of 91% based on 196 reviews, with an average rating of 7.3/10. The website's critical consensus reads, "Stronger rises on the power of its well-chosen ensemble to offer an emotionally resonant fact-based story that transcends inspirational drama clichés." On Metacritic, the film has a weighted average score of 76 out of 100, based on reviews from 41 critics. Audiences polled by CinemaScore gave the film an average grade of "A−" on an A+ to F scale.

=== Accolades ===
Award	Date of ceremony	Category	Recipients	Result	Ref.
Critics' Choice Movie Awards	January 11, 2018	Best Actor	Jake Gyllenhaal	Nominated	
Hollywood Film Awards	November 5, 2017	Hollywood Actor Award	Jake Gyllenhaal	Won	
Satellite Awards	February 10, 2018	Best Actor	Jake Gyllenhaal	Nominated	
