= Jake Gyllenhaal =

American actor (born 1980)

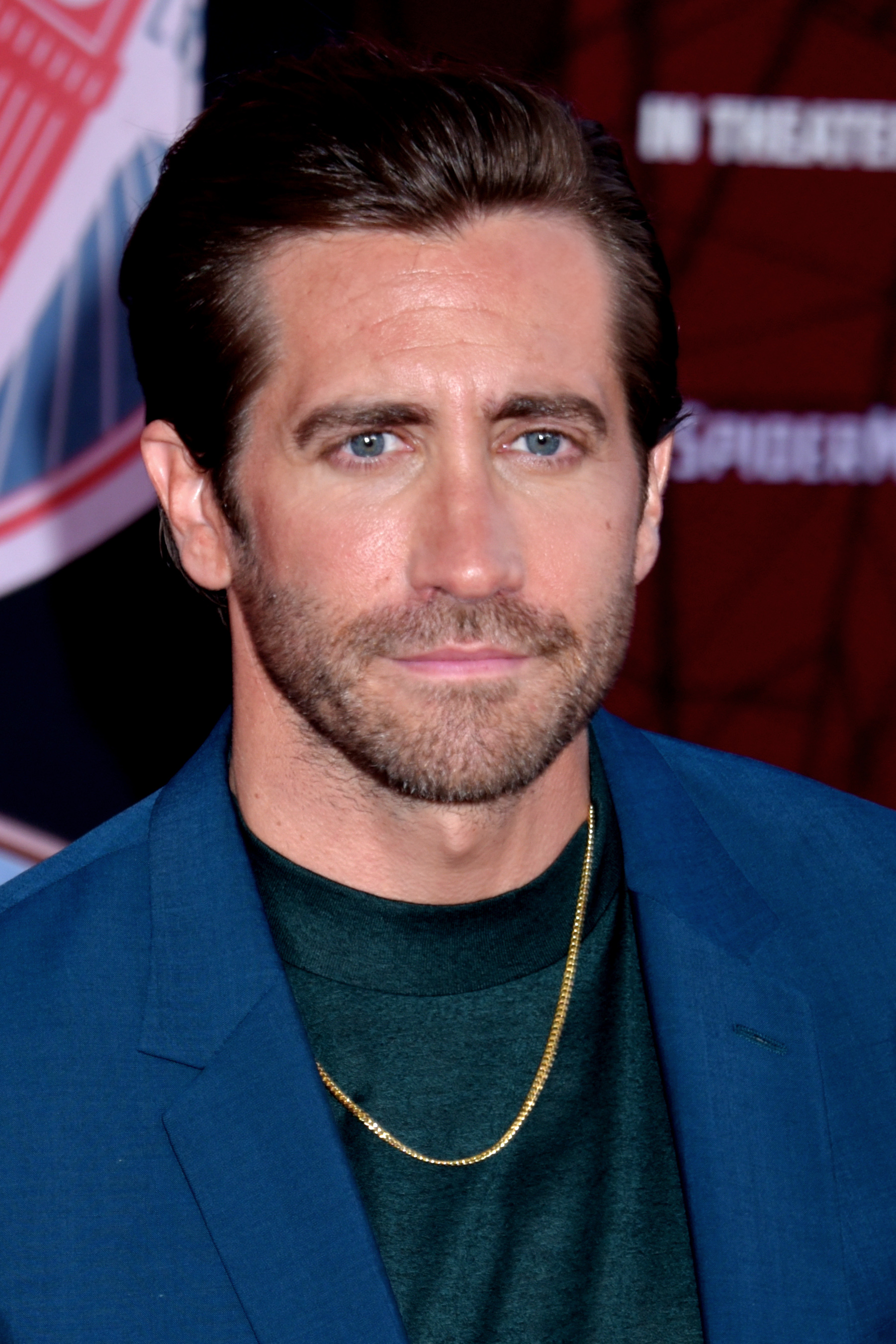
- Gyllenhaal in 2019
- Born: Jacob Benjamin Gyllenhaal; December 19, 1980 (age 45); Los Angeles, California, U.S.
- Occupations: Actor; producer
- Years active: 1991–present
- Works: Full list
- Parents: Stephen Gyllenhaal; Naomi Foner
- Family: Gyllenhaal
- Awards: Full list

Jacob Benjamin Gyllenhaal (Note: English pronunciation: /ˈdʒɪlənhɔːl/, JIL-ən-hawl Swedish: [ˈjʏ̂lːɛnˌhɑːl]) (born December 19, 1980) is an American actor. Known for his performances on screen and stage, he has received numerous accolades, including a BAFTA Award, as well as nominations for an Academy Award, three Golden Globe Awards, three Tony Awards, and a Primetime Emmy Award. Born into the Gyllenhaal family, he is the son of film director Stephen Gyllenhaal and screenwriter Naomi Foner, and the younger brother of actress Maggie Gyllenhaal.

Gyllenhaal began acting as a child, making his debut in the western comedy film City Slickers (1991), followed by roles in his father's films A Dangerous Woman (1993) and Homegrown (1998). His breakthrough came as Homer Hickam in the biopic October Sky (1999), which was followed by starring roles in the thriller Donnie Darko (2001), the romantic comedy The Good Girl (2002), the disaster film The Day After Tomorrow (2004), and the war drama Jarhead (2005). Gyllenhaal won the BAFTA Award for Best Actor in a Supporting Role and was nominated for the Academy Award for Best Supporting Actor for his portrayal of Jack Twist in Ang Lee's romantic western drama Brokeback Mountain (2005).

Gyllenhaal emerged as a leading man in films such as Zodiac (2007), Prince of Persia: The Sands of Time (2010), Source Code (2011), End of Watch (2012), Prisoners (2013), Southpaw (2015), Stronger (2017), and Wildlife (2018). He was nominated for the BAFTA Award for Best Actor in a Leading Role for his performances in Nightcrawler (2014) and Nocturnal Animals (2016). His highest-grossing grossing film is Spider-Man: Far From Home (2019). He also starred in the action films The Guilty (2021), Ambulance (2022) and Road House (2024). He starred in the Apple TV thriller series Presumed Innocent (2024) for which he was nominated for the Primetime Emmy Award for Outstanding Lead Actor in a Limited Series or Movie.

Gyllenhaal has also performed on stage, starring in a West End production of the play This Is Our Youth (2002) and Broadway productions of the musical Sunday in the Park with George (2017) as well as the plays Constellations (2014) and Sea Wall/A Life (2019), the last of which earned him a nomination for the Tony Award for Best Actor in a Play.

== Life and career ==
=== 1980–2000: Early life and career beginnings ===
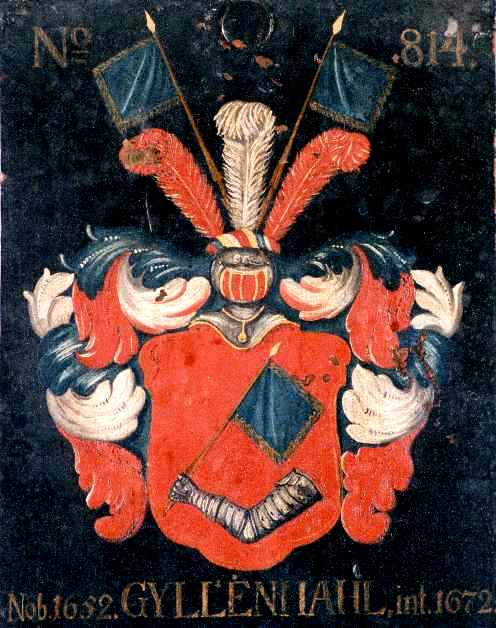
Coat of arms of the noble house Gyllenhaal

Jacob Benjamin Gyllenhaal was born on December 19, 1980, in Los Angeles, California, United States, to screenwriter Naomi Foner (née Achs) and film director Stephen Gyllenhaal. He has an older sister, actress Maggie Gyllenhaal. Gyllenhaal's father, who was raised as a Swedenborgian, is a Christian of Swedish and English descent and is a descendant of the Swedish noble Gyllenhaal family. Gyllenhaal's mother was born in New York City to an Ashkenazi Jewish family from Russia and Poland, (Note: Attributed to multiple references:) and Gyllenhaal considers himself Jewish. Gyllenhaal was born with a lazy eye and has been wearing corrective lenses since he was six years old. On his 13th birthday, he volunteered at a homeless shelter as a "Bar Mitzvah-like act", because his parents wanted to give him a sense of gratitude for his privileged lifestyle.

As a child, Gyllenhaal was regularly exposed to filmmaking due to his family's ties to the industry. His parents encouraged his artistic expression and allowed him to audition for acting roles, but usually forbade him to accept the roles if he were cast, as they wanted him to stay in school. They also insisted that he support himself with summer jobs, which included working as a lifeguard and busboy. He was allowed to make his acting debut in the comedy City Slickers (1991) as the son of Billy Crystal's character, but was not permitted to appear in The Mighty Ducks (1992) because it would have required him to leave home for two months. Gyllenhaal was allowed to appear in his father's productions several times, including A Dangerous Woman (1993), which also featured his sister Maggie; "Bop Gun", a 1994 episode of the series Homicide: Life on the Street; and the comedy film Homegrown (1998). He appeared alongside Maggie and their mother in two episodes of Molto Mario, an Italian cooking show on the Food Network. Prior to his senior year in high school, the only other film not directed by his father that Gyllenhaal appeared in was the little-known children's film Josh and S.A.M. (1993).

Gyllenhaal's first lead role in a film was in October Sky, Joe Johnston's 1999 adaptation of the Homer Hickam autobiography Rocket Boys, in which he portrayed a high school student from West Virginia who aspires to become a rocket scientist. Gyllenhaal was 17 during filming, and was tutored on set because he was still in school and taking advanced classes. The film was positively received and earned $32 million, and was described in the Sacramento News and Review as Gyllenhaal's "breakout performance". After graduating from the Harvard-Westlake School in Los Angeles in 1998, Gyllenhaal began studying Eastern religions and philosophy at Columbia University, where Maggie was a senior; their mother had attended Columbia as well. Gyllenhaal was a resident of the John Jay Hall dormitory, and after studying Buddhism at the university, he began to practice mindfulness in his everyday life. He dropped out of Columbia after two years to concentrate on acting, and later reflected that he had probably enrolled at the university to please his parents.

=== 2001–2004: Donnie Darko to the London stage ===
Gyllenhaal's second lead film role was in Richard Kelly's science fiction psychological thriller Donnie Darko (2001). The film was not a box office success upon release, but it eventually became a cult favorite. Gyllenhaal plays Donnie Darko, a troubled teenager who experiences visions of a humanoid rabbit named Frank who tells him that the world is coming to an end. Gyllenhaal's sister Maggie plays Donnie's sister in the film. Reviewing the film for Culture Vulture, Gary Mairs wrote that Gyllenhaal "manages the difficult trick of seeming both blandly normal and profoundly disturbed, often within the same scene."

Gyllenhaal's next role was Pilot Kelston in Highway (2002) alongside Jared Leto. His performance was described by one critic as "silly, clichéd and straight to video". Gyllenhaal had more success starring opposite Jennifer Aniston in The Good Girl, which premiered at the 2002 Sundance Film Festival; he also starred in Lovely and Amazing with Catherine Keener. In both films he played an unstable character who begins a reckless affair with an older woman. Gyllenhaal later described these as "teenager in transition" roles. He later starred in the romantic comedy Bubble Boy, which was loosely based on the story of David Vetter. The film received generally negative reviews from critics, with Paul Clinton of CNN calling it "stupid and devoid of any redeeming features".

Following Bubble Boy, Gyllenhaal starred with Dustin Hoffman, Susan Sarandon and Ellen Pompeo in Moonlight Mile (2002) as a young man coping with the death of his fiancée. The film, which received mixed reviews, was loosely based on writer-director Brad Silberling's personal experiences following the murder of his girlfriend, Rebecca Schaeffer. In his theatrical debut, Gyllenhaal starred on the London stage in Kenneth Lonergan's 2002 West End revival of This Is Our Youth at the Garrick Theatre. He had decided to try stage acting because every actor he looked up to had done theater work. The play ran for eight weeks, with Gyllenhaal winning the Standard Theatre Award for Outstanding Newcomer.

Gyllenhaal was almost cast as Spider-Man for the sequel film Spider-Man 2 (2004), due to director Sam Raimi's concerns about the health of Tobey Maguire, who had played the character in Spider-Man (2002). Maguire recovered, however, and starred in the film. In 2003, Gyllenhaal auditioned for the role of Batman in the superhero film Batman Begins, and was almost offered the part, but it went to Christian Bale. Gyllenhaal subsequently appeared in the science fiction film The Day After Tomorrow (2004), with Dennis Quaid portraying his character's father.

=== 2005–2011: Brokeback Mountain and leading roles ===
In 2005, Gyllenhaal appeared with Gwyneth Paltrow and Anthony Hopkins in the drama Proof, in which he played a graduate student who seeks to publish a revolutionary mathematical proof. The film received generally positive reviews. The same year, he starred as a U.S. Marine deployed during the Gulf War in Sam Mendes's Jarhead. The film earned generally favorable reviews, with Stephen Hunter of The Washington Post praising Gyllenhaal for effectively expressing his character's intelligence.

In Brokeback Mountain (2005), Gyllenhaal and Heath Ledger starred as young men who meet as sheep herders and embark upon a sexual relationship that begins in the summer of 1963 and lasts for 20 years. The film was often referred to in the media as "the gay cowboy movie", although there were differing opinions about the sexual orientations of the characters. The film won numerous accolades, including three Academy Awards, four Golden Globes, four British Academy Film Awards, and the Golden Lion at the 62nd Venice Film Festival. Gyllenhaal was nominated for Best Supporting Actor, an award which went to George Clooney for Syriana. Gyllenhaal and Ledger won the 2006 MTV Movie Award for Best Kiss. Shortly after the 2006 Academy Awards, Gyllenhaal was invited to join the Academy of Motion Picture Arts and Sciences.

Gyllenhaal was critical of the way Brokeback Mountain director Ang Lee disconnected from the actors once filming began, although he praised Lee for his sensitive approach to the story. When asked about his kissing scenes with Ledger in Brokeback Mountain, Gyllenhaal said, "As an actor, I think we need to embrace the times we feel most uncomfortable." When asked about the more intimate scenes with Ledger, Gyllenhaal likened them to "doing a sex scene with a woman I'm not particularly attracted to". Following the release of Brokeback Mountain, rumors circulated regarding the actor's sexual orientation. When asked about such gossip during an interview, Gyllenhaal said:

You know it's flattering when there's a rumor that says I'm bisexual. It means I can play more kinds of roles. I'm open to whatever people want to call me. I've never really been attracted to men sexually, but I don't think I would be afraid of it if it happened.

Gyllenhaal narrated the 2005 animated short film The Man Who Walked Between the Towers, based on Mordicai Gerstein's 2003 book about Philippe Petit's famous highwire stunt. As a guest host of the sketch comedy television series Saturday Night Live in January 2007, Gyllenhaal wore a sparkly evening dress and sang the song "And I Am Telling You I'm Not Going" from the musical Dreamgirls, dedicating it to fans of Brokeback Mountain. The same year, he starred as the political cartoonist Robert Graysmith in David Fincher's mystery thriller Zodiac, about the Zodiac Killer. In preparation for the role, Gyllenhaal videotaped Graysmith so he could study his mannerisms. The film received favorable reviews, with Paul Byrnes of The Sydney Morning Herald calling Gyllenhaal "terrific" in his role.

Gyllenhaal next starred alongside Meryl Streep, Alan Arkin and Reese Witherspoon in Gavin Hood's Rendition (2007), a political thriller about the U.S. policy of extraordinary rendition. The film earned mixed reviews, with David Edelstein of New York magazine calling Gyllenhaal "compelling". Two years later, Gyllenhaal co-starred with Tobey Maguire and Natalie Portman in Jim Sheridan's Brothers, a 2009 remake of Susanne Bier's Danish film Brothers (2004). It received generally favorable reviews, with Rotten Tomatoes stating that the three lead actors gave "rock-solid" performances. Gyllenhaal said that Maguire's intense preparation for his role in Brothers inspired Gyllenhaal to prepare in a similar way for his own roles.

In 2010, Gyllenhaal played the lead role in Prince of Persia: The Sands of Time, an adaptation of the 2003 video game, produced by Jerry Bruckheimer and released by Disney. The same year, his performance opposite Anne Hathaway in the romantic comedy Love & Other Drugs earned him a nomination for the Golden Globe Award for Best Performance by an Actor in a Motion Picture—Musical or Comedy. Gyllenhaal's sole performance in 2011 was as a U.S. Army Aviation captain in the time-travel thriller Source Code, which received positive reviews.

=== 2012–2018: Critical acclaim and Broadway debut ===
Gyllenhaal starred alongside Michael Peña in David Ayer's action thriller End of Watch (2012), about two Los Angeles police officers. The film, for which Gyllenhaal was also an executive producer, received mostly positive reviews, with Roger Ebert describing it as "one of the best police movies in recent years, a virtuoso fusion of performances and often startling action". To prepare for the role, Gyllenhaal took tactical training and participated in police ride-alongs with Peña to help establish the language of the characters.

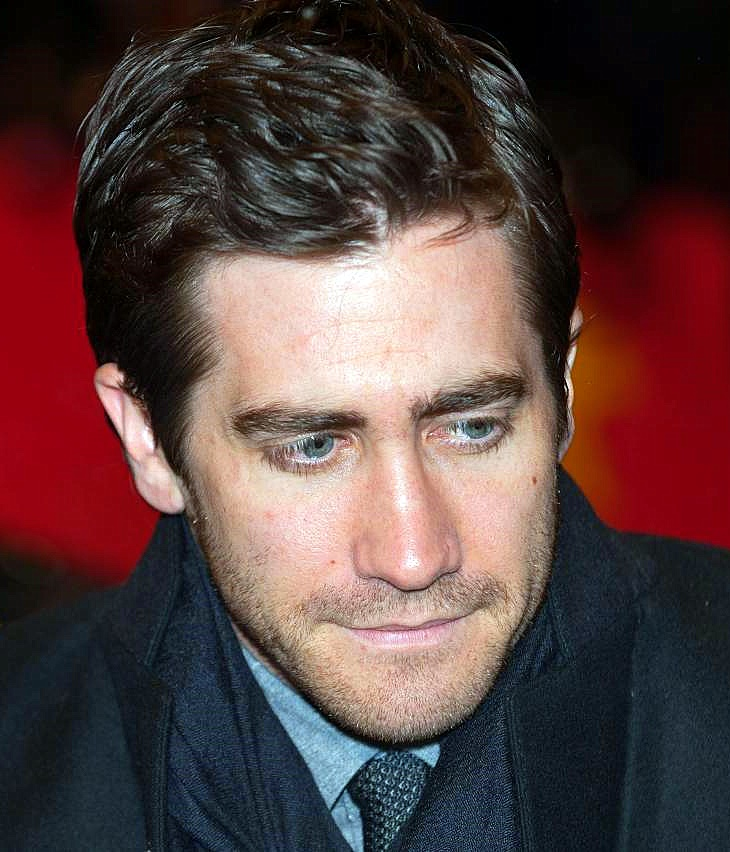
Gyllenhaal at the 2012 Berlin International Film Festival, where he served as a jury member

In 2012, Gyllenhaal served as a jury member for the 62nd Berlin International Film Festival and made his Off-Broadway debut in Nick Payne's play If There Is I Haven't Found It Yet at the Roundabout Theatre Company's Laura Pels Theatre. 2013 saw Gyllenhaal appear in two films directed by Denis Villeneuve, whom Gyllenhaal described as "an older brother". The first, the thriller Prisoners, starred Gyllenhaal as a detective named Loki in search of the abductor of two young girls. Rolling Stone critic Peter Travers praised Gyllenhaal's "exceptional" performance in the film. In the second collaboration, Gyllenhaal portrayed the dual role of a history teacher and his doppelgänger in the thriller Enemy. The following year, he produced and starred in the crime thriller Nightcrawler, earning Golden Globe Award, Actor Award, and BAFTA Award nominations for his performance. Several writers thought Gyllenhaal should have been nominated for the Academy Award for Best Actor as well. (Note: Attributed to multiple references:)

In 2015, Gyllenhaal served as a jury member for the main competition of the 2015 Cannes Film Festival. He also appeared in four films and made his Broadway debut in Payne's play Constellations, which ran from January to March at the Samuel J. Friedman Theatre. Gyllenhaal starred with Jessica Biel in the comedy Accidental Love, and in Antoine Fuqua's sports drama Southpaw. Geoffrey Macnab of The Independent found the plot of Southpaw unoriginal but praised the emotional vulnerability of Gyllenhaal's performance. Gyllenhaal also portrayed Scott Fischer in Baltasar Kormákur's Everest, which dramatizes the 1996 Mount Everest disaster; the film grossed $203 million worldwide. Finally, Gyllenhaal appeared in Jean-Marc Vallée's comedy-drama Demolition as an investment banker who rebuilds his life after his wife dies. Bilge Ebiri of The Village Voice wrote that Gyllenhaal channeled a "boyish curiosity, the quiet, wide-eyed uncertainty of someone discovering the world for the first time."

In 2016, Gyllenhaal starred in Tom Ford's neo-noir thriller Nocturnal Animals, based on the 1993 novel Tony and Susan by Austin Wright. The film received positive reviews, and Gyllenhaal was nominated for the BAFTA Award for Best Actor in a Leading Role. (Note: Attributed to multiple references:) Justin Chang of the Los Angeles Times wrote that Gyllenhaal's performance contained "rich emotional shadings". In October 2016, Gyllenhaal appeared as George in four benefit performances of the Stephen Sondheim and James Lapine musical Sunday in the Park with George at the New York City Center. Alexis Soloski of The Guardian wrote that Gyllenhaal "sang Sondheim superbly". In February 2017, Gyllenhaal reprised the role at the Hudson Theatre on Broadway, and was praised by Ben Brantley of The New York Times for his "searing theatrical presence". He was scheduled to appear in Lanford Wilson's Burn This on Broadway under the direction of Michael Mayer in 2017. However, a new production of Burn This took place in 2019 with Adam Driver appearing, with Gyllenhaal's production having reportedly been abandoned.

In 2017, Gyllenhaal starred as an astronaut in the science fiction horror film Life; Eric Henderson of Slant Magazine wrote that Gyllenhaal was "dead behind the eyes from his first scene". The same year, Gyllenhaal had a supporting role in the action-adventure film Okja and starred in the drama Stronger, which is based on the life of Jeff Bauman, a survivor of the Boston Marathon bombing. In his review of Stronger, Geoffrey Macnab of The Independent praised Gyllenhaal's versatility and "outstanding" portrayal of Bauman. The following year, Gyllenhaal co-starred with Carey Mulligan in the drama Wildlife, which is based on the 1990 novel by Richard Ford. Gyllenhaal portrayed a father who temporarily abandons his family to take a dangerous job. Ella Kemp, writing for Sight & Sound magazine, said the chemistry between Gyllenhaal and Mulligan "fizzes with an effortless dynamism". Gyllenhaal also had a role in the Western drama The Sisters Brothers (2018).

=== 2019–present: Action and thriller films ===
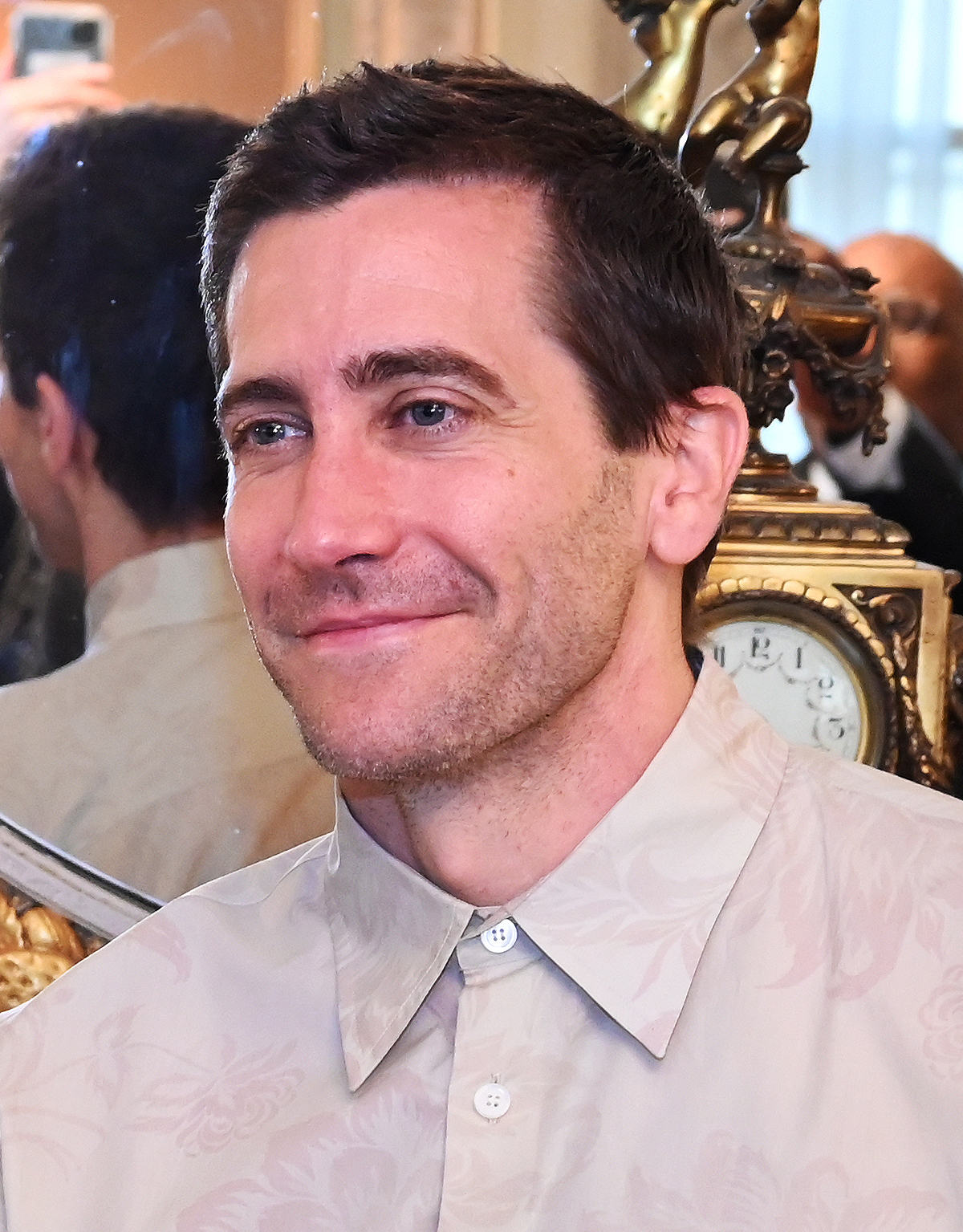
Gyllenhaal in 2025

Gyllenhaal reunited with Nightcrawler director Dan Gilroy for the thriller film Velvet Buzzsaw (2019) in which he plays an art critic. The film premiered at the 2019 Sundance Film Festival and was distributed by Netflix. Peter Debrudge of Variety felt that Gyllenhaal enjoyed his "cartoonishly camp" performance. The same year, Gyllenhaal played the comic book villain Mysterio / Quentin Beck in the superhero film Spider-Man: Far From Home, which takes place in the Marvel Cinematic Universe. It was one of the highest-grossing films of the year. Gyllenhaal appeared on stage alongside Tom Sturridge in Sea Wall/A Life, a double bill of monologues by Nick Payne and Simon Stephens, at the Hudson Theatre on Broadway in 2019, earning a Tony Award nomination for Best Actor in a Play. In 2021, he voiced a character in the animated film Spirit Untamed and played a detective in the crime thriller The Guilty, a remake of the Danish film The Guilty (2018).

In 2022, Gyllenhaal starred as a criminal in Michael Bay's action thriller Ambulance, which received mixed reviews from critics. The same year, he voiced a farmer in the Disney animated film Strange World. He subsequently appeared in Guy Ritchie's The Covenant (2023) and Doug Liman's action film Road House (2024). Following the success of Road House, Gyllenhaal's production company, Nine Stories Productions, signed a first-look deal with Amazon MGM Studios. In 2024 it was announced that Gyllenhaal would return to Broadway playing Iago in the 2025 revival of William Shakespeare's tragedy Othello, opposite Denzel Washington. In 2026, Gyllenhaal appeared in the gothic romance film The Bride!, directed by his sister Maggie.

== Public image ==
In 2006, Gyllenhaal was named by People magazine as one of the "50 Most Beautiful People", and one of the "Hottest Bachelors". He was ranked number 35 in a 2013 Empire poll of The 100 Sexiest Movie Stars. In a poll conducted by Glamour, Gyllenhaal was selected as one of the Sexiest Men of The Year 2018.

== Personal life ==
=== Family and relationships ===
Gyllenhaal's godmother is the actress Jamie Lee Curtis, and he has two godfathers: the actor and director Paul Newman (1925–2008), and the cinematographer Robert Elswit. (Note: Attributed to multiple references:) Gyllenhaal is the godfather of Matilda Rose Ledger (born 2005), the daughter of his Brokeback Mountain co-stars Heath Ledger and Michelle Williams.

Gyllenhaal began dating the actress Kirsten Dunst in 2002 after his sister Maggie, who starred with Dunst in Mona Lisa Smile, introduced them. Gyllenhaal and Dunst separated in 2004 on friendly terms. Gyllenhaal dated his Rendition co-star Reese Witherspoon from 2007 until 2009; the singer-songwriter Taylor Swift from October 2010 to January 2011; and the model Alyssa Miller in 2013. (Note: Attributed to multiple references:) Gyllenhaal has been in a relationship with the model Jeanne Cadieu since 2018.

In 2006, Gyllenhaal and Maggie escaped a fire that destroyed Manka's Inverness Lodge in Inverness, California, where they were vacationing.

=== Politics ===
Ahead of the 2004 U.S. presidential election, Gyllenhaal campaigned for Democratic Party presidential nominee John Kerry. He and Maggie also visited the University of Southern California to film a segment for the Oprah Winfrey Show and to urge students to vote. Leading up to the 2018 midterm elections, Gyllenhaal endorsed Stacey Abrams, Andrew Gillum, Beto O'Rourke, Jacky Rosen, and Kyrsten Sinema in their respective U.S. Senate or gubernatorial races.

=== Advocacy ===
In 2003, Gyllenhaal participated in an advertising campaign for the American Civil Liberties Union. He has served as the Honorary Chair of the New Eyes for the Needy Advisory Board and has supported the organization Stand Up to Cancer. He has served on the board of directors for the Anti-Recidivism Coalition and has volunteered in California juvenile detention centers with the film producer Scott Budnick. In 2014, Gyllenhaal attended an event that benefited the Headstrong Project, an organization that provides treatment to military veterans suffering from post traumatic stress disorder, during which he read a poem by a veteran. In 2017, he participated in a fundraiser to help survivors who lost limbs during the September 11 attacks.

Gyllenhaal has donated money to have trees planted in a Mozambique forest, partly to promote the Future Forests program. After filming The Day After Tomorrow, he flew to the Arctic to raise awareness about climate change. He has described the climate activist Greta Thunberg as an inspiring figure.

== See also ==
- List of actors with Academy Award nominations
- List of siblings with Academy Award acting nominations
- List of Jewish Academy Award winners and nominees
