= Carlos Arredondo =

Costa Rican-American peace activist

- Carlos Arredondo at the January 2007 anti-war protest in Washington, D.C.
- Born: August 25, 1960 (age 66)
- Occupations: Peace activist; volunteer; cab driver; bus driver; truck driver

Carlos Alexander Brian Arredondo (born August 25, 1960) is a Costa Rican-American peace activist and an American Red Cross volunteer. He became an anti-war activist after his 20-year-old eldest son Lance Corporal Alexander Arredondo was killed in action during the Iraq War in 2004.

== Death of first son ==
Arredondo had two sons Marine Lance Corporal Alexander Scott Arredondo and Brian Luis Arredondo with his first wife, Victoria Foley. Alexander Scott and Brian Luis were born in Boston, Massachusetts, and raised on South Street in Jamaica Plain, Boston. After the couple divorced, both sons lived with their mother. Alexander graduated from the Blue Hills Regional Technical School, Canton in 2002 and joined the US Marines the same year.

Alexander Scott was killed in Najaf, Iraq, during his second tour of duty in Operation Iraqi Freedom on August 25, 2004. Later that day, which was Carlos Arredondo's 44th birthday, the Marines Corps Casualty Assistance Team arrived at the Arredondo home in Hollywood, Florida, to notify the family of their son's death. The Marines had not brought a chaplain with them and spoke with Arredondo in the front yard of his home. Arredondo was distressed by the news, and became upset and agitated when the Marines refused to leave.

After some time went by, according to news reports, Arredondo was so distraught that he grabbed a hammer and proceeded to destroy the Marines' van. He then grabbed gasoline and climbed in the Marines' van and splashed gasoline inside the van. A propane torch he had brought inside was lit accidentally, Arredondo said.

Arredondo was pulled out to safety by the Marines; however, his clothes had caught fire and burned 26% of his body. He received second- and third-degree burns. He was hospitalized in a burn unit for two weeks followed by outpatient home-based treatment. Despite his burns, he attended his son's funeral on a stretcher with two paramedics at his side. Arredondo and his wife Melida both spent time as inpatient psychiatric patients.

The incident is highlighted in the documentary film The Prosecution of an American President, directed by Dave Hagen and David J. Burke. Arredondo and his wife Melida traveled to Hollywood to speak at a screening for the film at the Arclight theater in October, 2012.

Arredondo, who once was an illegal (undocumented) immigrant and later became a US citizen is originally from Costa Rica. At the time he had no insurance and was self-employed working as a handyman. His story made national and international headlines. His recovery took over a year. Since that time he apologized to the Marines for his drastic actions. He was not prosecuted. His son was also awarded Navy and Marine Corps Commendation Medal with combat "V" and the Purple Heart for his services during the battle.

== Activism ==
Arredondo along with his second wife Melida were members of the now defunct organization Gold Star Families For Peace whose mission stated:

We as families of soldiers who have died as a result of war are organizing to be a positive force in our world to bring our country's sons and daughters home from Iraq, [and] to minimize the human cost of this war...

Arredondo and his wife Mélida became activists for peace and have had speaking engagements around the country speaking about his personal tragedy and to parents about the methods recruiters use to enlist youth. He especially works to reach out to the Spanish-speaking community.

The Arredondos requested during Mitt Romney's governorship to have flags placed at half-staff upon the death of a Massachusetts native related to his or her war injuries in 2005, a wish that Alex had when he noticed after his first deployment how the public was not noticing the war deaths. They have also lobbied for families' decisions to allow press to cover the arrival of their troops' remains from the combat zone, which was banned due to a statute from George Bush, Sr.'s administration.

On December 12, 2006, Arredondo became a U.S citizen, with the help of U.S. Senator Edward Kennedy. He became eligible for citizenship under USCIS INA 329A which allowed parents of those killed in action to become US citizens. He legally changed his name to Alexander Brian Arredondo upon attaining his citizenship.

During a daytime peaceful anti-war protest on September 15, 2007, Arredondo was physically assaulted by a mob of counter protesters. The assailants followed Arredondo as he pulled his son's memorial, purposely yelling epithets and eventually seizing a photo of Alex from the casket. An attempt to retrieve his dead son's photo provoked the men to kick Arredondo in the head, legs, stomach and back. Police defused the situation before major damage could be inflicted.

In August 2011, a federal post office at 655 Centre St in Jamaica Plain, Boston, a neighborhood where his son grew up, was renamed "Lance Corporal Alexander Scott Arredondo, United States Marine Corps Post Office Building" following legislation proposed by US Representative Michael E. Capuano and co-sponsored by nine other legislators, and later signed by the President in January 2011.

== Brian Arredondo ==
On December 19, 2011, Arredondo's surviving son, Brian, died by suicide after battling depression and drug addiction ever since his brother's death He was 24 years old at the time. Subsequently, the Arredondos dedicated themselves to attending suicide groups sessions and conferences, especially related to military-related suicides. Both worked with elected officials on the state and local level to change policies pertaining to such suicides.

== Boston Marathon bombing ==
On April 15, 2013, Arredondo attended the 2013 Boston Marathon. At around 2:50 p.m. EDT (18:50 UTC), two bombs were detonated during the race in Copley Square, just before the finish line. Arredondo immediately sprinted into action and he can be seen in a series of photos and videos of the aftermath pulling debris and fencing away from the bloody victims, clearing the way for emergency personnel to tend to their wounds. He saw Jeff Bauman, missing both of his legs and losing blood rapidly. Arredondo lifted Bauman and put him into a wheelchair, and when the fabric used as a tourniquet kept getting caught in the wheels, Arredondo held the fabric out of the way.

In an iconic photograph, Carlos Arredondo with his cowboy hat is helping rush Jeff Bauman to an ambulance. In several images of Carlos rushing Jeff off in the wheelchair, Carlos can be seen pinching one of Jeff’s femoral arteries to prevent fatal blood loss. He remains in touch with the victims of the bombings, including Jeff Bauman. Arredondo was a spectator of the race, there to support and cheer on members of the National Guard Tough Ruck group, who were running to raise money for families of fallen service members and raise awareness about suicide. A soldier was running in honor of his two deceased sons.
