= Jeff Bauman =

American author (born 1986)

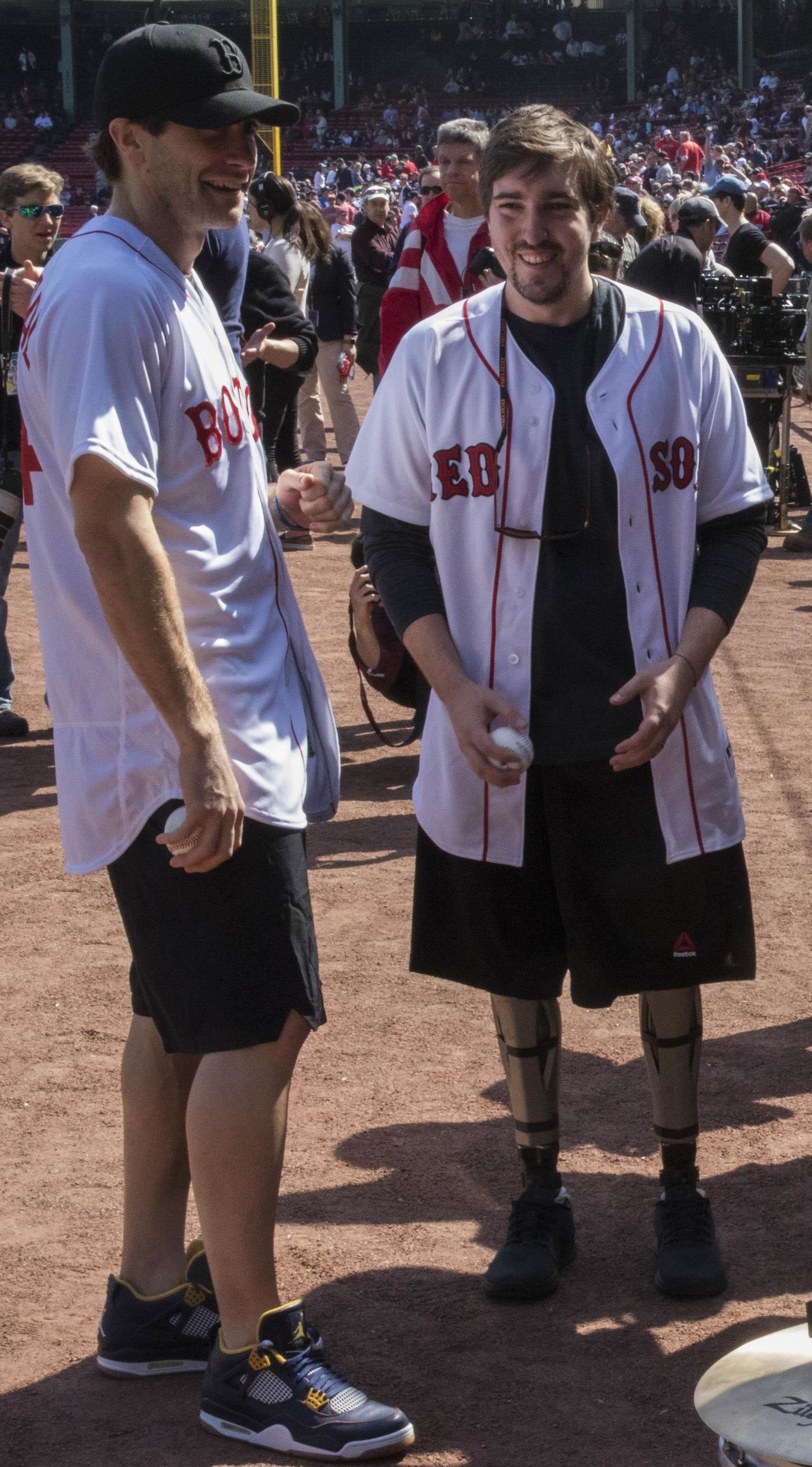
- Jeff Bauman (right) and Jake Gyllenhaal at Fenway Park in 2016
- Born: January 2, 1986 (age 40); Chelmsford, Massachusetts, U.S.
- Occupation: Author
- Known for: Boston Marathon bombing
- Children: 1

Jeff Bauman (born January 2, 1986) is an American author. He lost both of his legs during the Boston Marathon Bombing attack in 2013 and was the subject of a famous photograph taken in the aftermath of the bombing. The film Stronger is based on a memoir of the same name he co-wrote, with actor Jake Gyllenhaal portraying Bauman.

== Early life ==
Jeff Bauman was born on January 2, 1986, and is the son of Jeff Bauman Sr. and Patty Bauman. Jeff Bauman married Erin Hurley in 2014. The couple have a daughter, who was born on July 13, 2014. They later divorced. He worked in the service deli at Costco for three years before the bombing; he returned to his job a year after the blast in June 2014.

== Bombing ==
Jeff Bauman had been waiting at the finish line of the 2013 Boston Marathon, cheering for his then ex-girlfriend Hurley who was participating in the marathon, with Hurley's two roommates. She was a mile away from the finish when the bombs went off. Carlos Arredondo, who was handing out American flags to the runners, quickly jumped over a fence to reach the blast site. Bauman's shirt caught fire from the blast and was beaten out by Arredondo. He stayed with Bauman and helped carry him to the ambulance. The famous photograph of Carlos Arredondo in a cowboy hat, helping Bauman was taken by Charles Krupa of the Associated Press during this time.

== Aftermath ==
Bauman's surgery was done on the same day, and he had both his legs amputated above the knee. Since he had lost large amounts of blood, the doctors had to keep resuscitating him, giving him blood and fluids. He underwent another operation at 1 a.m. to drain the internal fluids, formed by the blunt trauma. He was interviewed by Federal Bureau of Investigation (FBI) agents and gave a description of Tamerlan Tsarnaev, after he sent word to the authorities after waking up from the operation, that he had seen one of the bombers. His accounts were instrumental in narrowing down the suspects from among the people pictured in the area. He was discharged from the hospital four weeks after the blasts. Bauman was given his new prosthetic legs costing $100,000 each, which were manufactured by Ottobock and had micro-processors to follow his gait. He and Arredondo threw the ceremonial first pitches for the Boston Red Sox a few days later.

In September 2013, he announced that he would publish a memoir about his experiences at the marathon and his life since then. The book was co-written with author Bret Witter. Photographer Josh Haner of The New York Times, who documented Bauman's recovery process, won the Pulitzer Prize for Feature Photography for the work. Bauman's book, titled Stronger, was released in April 2014 to coincide with the first anniversary of the bombings. A film based on the memoir, starring Jake Gyllenhaal as Bauman and Tatiana Maslany as Hurley, and titled Stronger, was released on September 22, 2017.
