= Belgian Player of the Year (basketball) =

The Belgian Prayer of the Year (Belgische Speler van het Jaar in Dutch) is an annual Basketball League Belgium Division I award given to the best player with a Belgian nationality. The award is organized by the Belgian newspaper Het Nieuwsblad.

The first award was given after the 1958-59 season. From the 1974-75 season, the award is also given to woman.

Between 1981 and 1994, Rik Samaey won the award for a record of ten times.

== Winners ==
Season	Men	Position (Note: The player's primary position is listed.)	Team	Women	Team	Ref(s)
1958–59	Jef Eygel	PG	Antwerpse			
1959–60	John Loridon		Brabo			
1960–61	Jef Eygel (2×)	PG	Antwerpse			
1961–62	René Aerts		Antwerpse			
1962–63	Jef Eygel (3×)	PG	Antwerpse			
1963–64	Jef Eygel (4×)	PG	Antwerpse			
1964–65	Willy Steveniers	SG	R.C. Mechelen			
1965–66	Willy Steveniers (2×)	SG	R.C. Mechelen			
1966–67	Willy Steveniers (3×)	SG	R.C. Mechelen			
1967–68	Gilbert Ibens		Pitzemburg Basket			
1968–69	Theo Hillen		R.C. Mechelen			
1969–70	Willy Steveniers (4×)	SG	Standard Liège			
1970–71	Jack Verdeyen		Bus Lier			
1971–72	Robert Van Herzele		Bus Lier			
1972–73	Jos Peeters		R.C. Mechelen			
1973–74	Etienne Geerts		Antwerpse			
1974–75	Robert Van Herzele (2×)		Bus Lier	Ewa Wasiliewska	Charles Quint Fémina	
1975–76	Etienne Geerts (2×)		Antwerpse	Lieve Verbruggen	Amicale Merelbeke	
1976–77	Etienne Geerts (3×)		Standard Liège	Hilde Van Boxelaer	Amicale Merelbeke	
1977–78	François Huysmans		Verviers	Ewa Wasiliewska (2x)	Charles Quint Fémina	
1978–79	Ivo Van Poppelen		Fresh Air	Monique Suppeley	BC Koksijde	
1979–80	François Huysmans (2×)		Verviers	Ewa Wasiliewska (3x)	Charles Quint Fémina	
1980–81	Rik Samaey	SF	Oostende	Lieve Verbruggen (2x)	Amicale Merelbeke	
1981–82	Rik Samaey (2×)	SF	Oostende	Sonja Tankrey	BC Koksijde	
1982–83	Rik Samaey (3×)	SF	Oostende	Nathalie Desplat	Charles Quint Fémina	
1983–84	Rik Samaey (4×)	SF	Oostende	Annelies Bressinck	Spartacus Antwerpen	
1984–85	Rik Samaey (5×)	SF	Oostende	Danielle De Wandeleer	Monceau Féminin	
1985–86	Rik Samaey (6×)	SF	R.C. Mechelen	Annelies Bressinck (2x)	Spartacus Antwerpen	
1986–87	Rik Samaey (7×)	SF	R.C. Mechelen	Inez Creemers	Osiris Denderleeuw	
1987–88	Rik Samaey (8×)	SF	R.C. Mechelen	Claudia Van Horenbeeck	Amicale Gent	
1988–89	Rik Samaey (9×)	SF	R.C. Mechelen	Martine Severens	Osiris Denderleeuw	
1989–90	Ronny Bayer	PG	R.C. Mechelen	Caroline De Roose	Miniflat Waregem	
1990–91	Éric Struelens	PF/C	R.C. Mechelen	Marina Piccard	Saint-Servais BC	
1991–92	Éric Struelens (2×)	PF/C	R.C. Mechelen	Cathy Populaire	Saint-Servais BC	
1992–93	Herman Bruyninckx		Leuven Bears	Pascale Van Roy	Saint-Servais BC	
1993–94	Rik Samaey (10×)	SF	R.C. Mechelen	Ilse Nuytens	Soubry Kortrijk	
1994–95	Jean-Marc Jaumin	PG	Oostende	Ilse Nuytens (2x)	Soubry Kortrijk	
1995–96	Jaques Stas		Spirou Charleroi	Jehanne Detry	Soubry Kortrijk	
1996–97	Jean-Marc Jaumin (2×)	PG	Oostende	Jehanne Detry (2x)	Soubry Kortrijk	
1997–98	David Desy		Spirou Charleroi	Marie-An Caers	Dexia Namur	
1998–99	Jaques Stas (2×)		Spirou Charleroi	Nele Deyaert	Dexia Namur	
1999–00	Yves Dupont	C	Racing Basket Antwerpen	Marie-An Caers (2x)	Dexia Namur	
2000–01	Tomas Van Den Spiegel	C	Telindus Oostende	Kathy Wambé	Dexia Namur	
2001–02	Christophe Beghin	PF/C	Telindus Oostende	Kathy Wambé (2x)	Dexia Namur	
2002–03	Roel Moors	PG	Spirou Charleroi	Marie-An Caers (3x)	Dexia Namur	
2003–04	Roel Moors (2×)	PG	Spirou Charleroi	Evelien Callens	Tulikivi Deerlijk	
2004–05	Yves Dupont (2×)	C	Euphony Bree	Marie-An Caers (4x)	IMC Dames Waregem	
2005–06	Jean-Marc Jaumin (3×)	PG	Telindus Oostende	Sofie Hendrickx	Sint-Katelijne-Waver	
2006–07	Sam Van Rossom	PG	Telindus Oostende	Nele Deyaert	Dexia Namur	
2007–08	Sam Van Rossom (2×)	PG	Base BC Oostende	Nele Deyaert (2x)	IMC Dames Waregem	
2008–09	Christophe Beghin (2×)	PF/C	Antwerp Diamond Giants	Nele Deyaert (3x)	Declercq Stortbeton Waregem BC	
2009–10	Christophe Beghin (3×)	PF/C	Antwerp Diamond Giants	Sofie Hendrickx (2x)	Sint-Katelijne-Waver	
2010–11	Roel Moors (3×)	PG	Antwerp Diamond Giants	Emma Meesseman	Blue Cats Ieper	
2011–12	Jorn Steinbach	PG	Generali Okapi Aalstar	Emma Meesseman (2x)	Blue Cats Ieper	
2012–13	Roel Moors (4×)	PG	Port of Antwerp Giants	Hind Ben Abdelkader	Sint-Katelijne-Waver	
2013–14	Maxime De Zeeuw	PF	Port of Antwerp Giants	Marjorie Carpréaux	Castors Braine	
2014–15	Pierre-Antoine Gillet	PF	Telenet Oostende	Kim Mestdagh	Castors Braine	
2015–16	Quentin Serron	PG/SG	Telenet Oostende	Julie Allemand	Castors Braine	
2016–17	Olivier Troisfontaines	SG/SF	Crelan Okapi Aalstar	Antonia Delaere	Castors Braine	
2017–18	Jean Salumu	G/SF	Oostende	Laure Résimont	Sint-Katelijne-Waver	
2018–19	Hans Vanwijn	PF	Antwerp Giants	Laure Résimont (2x)	Sint-Katelijne-Waver	
2019–20	Hans Vanwijn (2x)	PF	Antwerp Giants	Billie Massey	Sint-Katelijne-Waver	
2020–21	Loïc Schwartz	SG	Oostende	Billie Massey (2x)	Sint-Katelijne-Waver	
2021–22	Wen Mukubu	SF	Kangoeroes Basket Mechelen	Maxuella Lisowa	Castors Braine	
2022–23	Pierre-Antoine Gillet (2x)	PF	Oostende	Nastja Claessens	ION Waregem	
2023–24	Pierre-Antoine Gillet (3x)	PF	Oostende	Laure Résimont (3x)	Kangoeroes Mechelen	
2024–25	Niels De Ridder	PF	Kortrijk Spurs	Marie Vervaet	Castors Braine	

== Awards by player ==
Player	Total	Years
Rik Samaey	10	1981-1989, 1994
Jef Eygel	4	1959, 1961, 1963, 1964
Willy Steveniers	4	1965-1967, 1970
Roel Moors	4	2003, 2004, 2011, 2013
Etienne Geerts	3	1974, 1976, 1977
Jean-Marc Jaumin	3	1995, 1997, 2006
Christophe Beghin	3	2002, 2009, 2010
Pierre-Antoine Gillet	3	2015, 2023, 2024
Robert Van Herzele	2	1996, 1999
François Huysmans	2	1978, 1980
Éric Struelens	2	1991, 1992
Jaques Stas	2	1996, 1999
Yves Dupont	2	2000, 2005
Sam Van Rossom	2	2007, 2008
Hans Vanwijn	2	2019, 2020
