= Hans Vanwijn =

Belgian basketball player (born 1995)

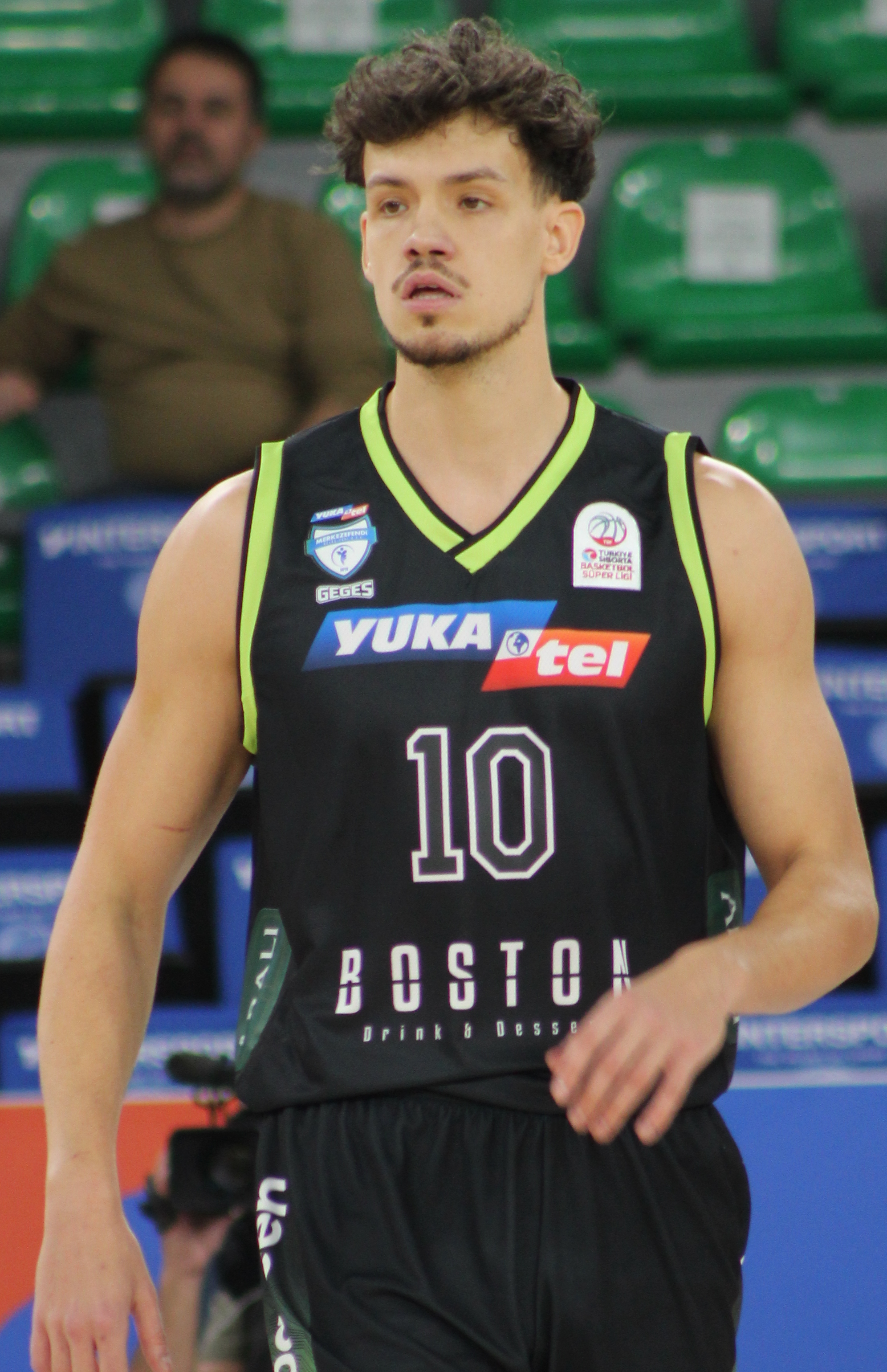

No. 0 – Anwil Włocławek
- Position: Power forward
- League: Polish Basketball League

Personal information
- Born: 15 February 1995 (age 31) Heusden-Zolder, Belgium
- Listed height: 208 cm (6 ft 10 in)
- Listed weight: 93 kg (205 lb)

Career information
- NBA draft: 2017: undrafted
- Playing career: 2010–present

Career history
- 2013–2014: Leuven Bears
- 2014–2017: Limburg United
- 2017–2020: Antwerp Giants
- 2020–2021: JDA Dijon
- 2021–2022: Casademont Zaragoza
- 2022–2023: Nanterre 92
- 2023: BCM Gravelines-Dunkerque
- 2023–2024: Hapoel Holon
- 2024–2026: Merkezefendi Basket
- 2026–present: Anwil Włocławek

Career highlights
- 2× Belgian Cup champion (2019, 2020); 2× Belgian Player of the Year (2019, 2020); Belgian League Young Player of the Year (2016)

Hans Vanwijn (born 15 February 1995) is a Belgian professional basketball player for Anwil Włocławek of the Polish Basketball League (PLK).

== Professional career ==
Vanwijn was named the BLB Young Player of the Year during the 2015–16 season, after averaging 7.2 points and 5.6 rebounds per game for Limburg.

In 2016-17 playing for Limburg, he averaged 7.8 points and 4.3 rebounds per game.

On 14 April 2017, it was announced that Vanwijn transferred to Antwerp Giants, signing a 3-year contract with the club. In 2017–18, he averaged 9.6 points and 6.2 rebounds per game, and shot 42% from three point range. In 2018–19, he averaged 6.7 points and 5.0 rebounds per game. In the 2018–19 season, he reached the Final Four of the Basketball Champions League with Antwerp. The team ended in the third place.

After the 2019–20 season was cancelled due to the COVID-19 pandemic, Vanwijn decided not to extend his contract with Antwerp.

On 8 July 2021 he signed with Casademont Zaragoza of the Liga ACB. Playing for them in 2021–22, he averaged 6.4 points and 3.0 rebounds per game.

On 1 July 2022 he signed with Nanterre 92 of the LNB Pro A. Playing for Nanterre, he averaged 5.2 points and 3.8 rebounds per game.

At the beginning of July 2023, after a very difficult season individually at Nanterre 92, Vanwijn signed and reunited with his former coach Laurent Legname at BCM Gravelines-Dunkerque.

On December 1, 2023, he signed with Hapoel Holon of the Israeli Basketball Premier League.

On November 1, 2024, he signed with Merkezefendi Belediyesi Denizli of the Basketbol Süper Ligi (BSL).

On July 22, 2026, he signed with Anwil Włocławek of the Polish Basketball League (PLK).

== International career ==
Vanwijn has been a member of the Belgian national basketball team since 2017.

== Honours ==
Antwerp Giants

- Belgian Cup (2): 2018–19, 2019–20
