= Dušan Đorđević (basketball) =

Serbian basketball player

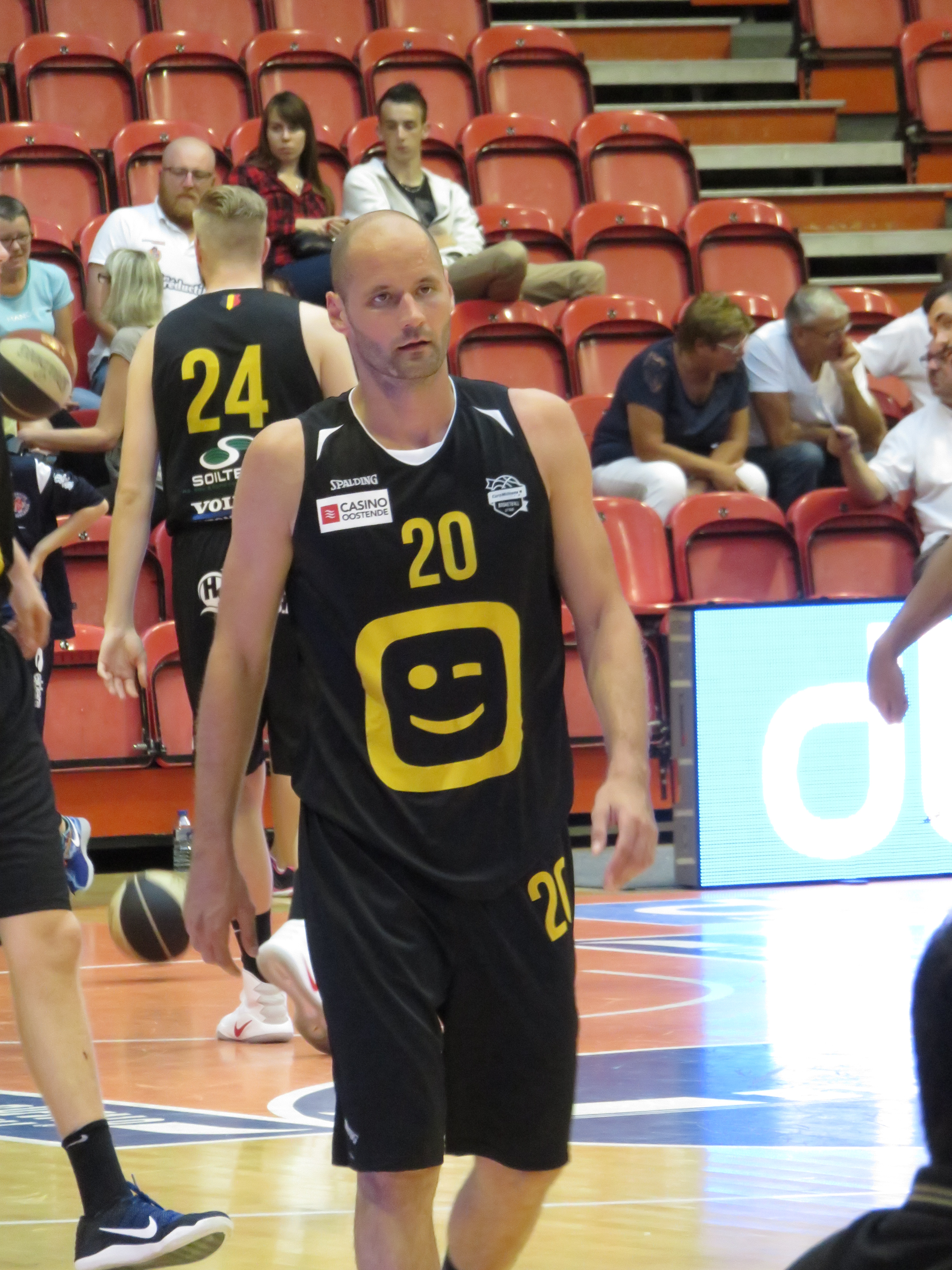
- Đorđević with Telenet Oostende in 2016

Personal information
- Born: 29 March 1983 (age 43) Belgrade, SR Serbia, SFR Yugoslavia
- Listed height: 1.95 m (6 ft 5 in)
- Listed weight: 96 kg (212 lb)

Career information
- NBA draft: 2005: undrafted
- Playing career: 2001–2023
- Position: Point guard / shooting guard
- Number: 20

Career history
- 2001–2003: Radnički Belgrade
- 2003–2004: Lokomotiv Rostov
- 2004–2005: Spartak St Petersburg
- 2005: Iraklis
- 2005–2008: Vojvodina Srbijagas
- 2008–2009: Bosna
- 2009–2010: Union Olimpija
- 2010–2011: Krka
- 2011–2023: Oostende

Career highlights
- No. 20 retired by Oostende; 12× Belgian League champion (2011–2023); 7× Belgian Cup winner (2013–2018, 2021); 5× Belgian Supercup winner (2014, 2015, 2017, 2018, 2021); 2× BNXT Supercup winner (2021, 2022); Slovenian Cup winner (2010); 2× Belgian League MVP (2014, 2015); 3× Belgian Cup MVP (2014, 2017, 2018); Belgian League Star of the Coaches (2015); Belgian League All-Defensive Team (2018)
Medals
Men's basketball
Representing FR Yugoslavia
European Championship for Cadets
Gold medal – first place	1999 Slovenia	Team

Dušan Đorđević (Cyrillic: Душан Ђорђевић; born 29 March 1983) is a Serbian former professional basketball player. He is most known for his successful 12 seasons as the captain of Belgian club Oostende.

Đorđević plays the point guard and is well known for his play making and leadership abilities. During his career he has won multiple championships in different countries, including Slovenia, Belgium and Bosnia and Herzegovina.

With Oostende, he won twelve consecutive Belgian League championships and seven Belgian Cups. Individually, he was named the league MVP in 2014 and 2015, and was named the Belgian Cup MVP three times.

== Honours ==
Bosna

- Cup of Bosnia and Herzegovina: 2009

Union Olimpija

- Slovenian Cup: 2010

Krka

- EuroChallenge: 2011
- Slovenian League: 2011

Oostende

- 12× Belgian Championship: 2012, 2013, 2014, 2015, 2016, 2017, 2018, 2019, 2020, 2021, 2022, 2023
- 7× Belgian Cup: 2013, 2014, 2015, 2016, 2017, 2018, 2021
- 4× Belgian Basketball Supercup: 2014, 2015, 2017, 2018
- 2× BNXT Supercup: 2021, 2022

Individual awards

- 2× Belgian League MVP (2): 2014, 2015
- 3× Belgian Cup MVP (2): 2014, 2017, 2018
- Belgian League Star of the Coaches: 2015
