= Pro Basketball League Rising Star =

Pro Basketball league award

The Pro Basketball League (PBL) Rising Star is an annual Pro Basketball League (PBL) award given to the best young player in the top tier domestic basketball league in Belgium. Formerly, the award was named the PBL Most Promising Player of the Year. Maxime De Zeeuw was the inaugural winner in 2009.

== Winners ==
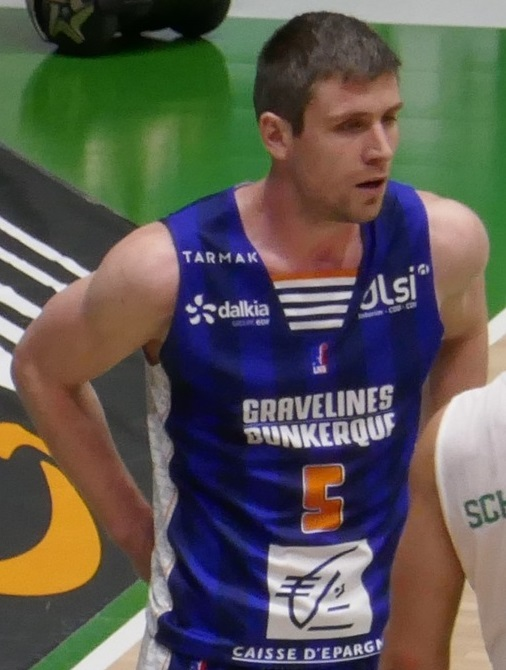
Quentin Serron won the Rising Star award in 2011

Key
Player (X)	Name of the player and number of times they had won the award at that point (if more than one)
Club (X)	Name of the club and the number of times a player of it has won the award (if more than one)
†	Denotes player whose team won championship that year
^	Denotes player who is still active in the PBL

Season	Player	Position	Nationality	Team	Ref(s)
2008–09	Maxime De Zeeuw	Power forward	Belgium	Antwerp Giants	
2009–10	Jorn Steinbach	Point guard	Belgium	Okapi Aalstar	
2010–11†	Quentin Serron	Shooting guard	Belgium	Telenet Oostende	
2011–12	Jean-Marc Mwema^	Power forward	Belgium (Note: Jean-Marc Mwema also owns the Ugandan nationality.)	Antwerp Giants	
2012–13†	Jean Salumu	Shooting guard	Belgium	Telenet Oostende	
2013–14†	Pierre-Antoine Gillet	Power forward	Belgium	Telenet Oostende	
2014–15	Vincent Kesteloot^	Small forward	Belgium	Okapi Aalstar	
2015–16	Hans Vanwijn	Power forward	Belgium	Limburg United	
2016–17	Ismaël Bako	Center	Belgium	Leuven Bears	
2017–18	Thomas Akyazili	Point guard	Belgium	Telenet Giants Antwerp	
2018–19	Sigfredo Casero-Ortiz	Point guard	Belgium	Okapi Aalstar	
2019–20	Seppe D'Espalier^	Point guard	Belgium	Leuven Bears	
2020–21	Vrenz Bleijenbergh	Guard	Belgium	Antwerp Giants	

== Awards by club ==
Player	Total
Antwerp Giants	4
Oostende	3
Okapi Aalstar	3
