= Quentin Serron =

Belgian basketball player

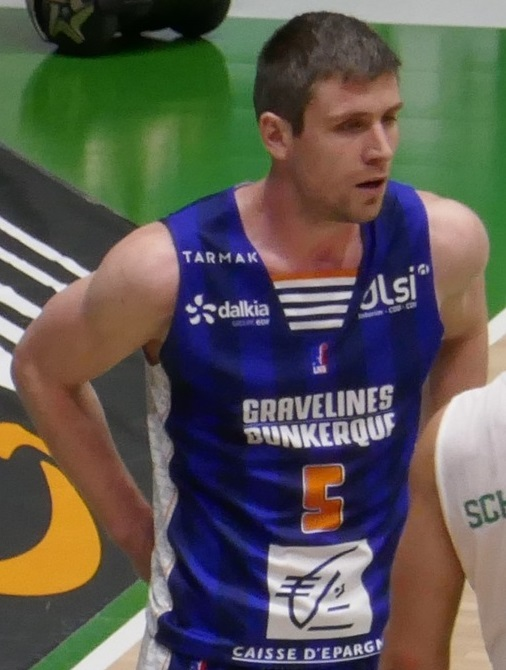
- Serron playing for Belgium during EuroBasket 2015

Free Agent
- Position: Point guard / shooting guard

Personal information
- Born: 25 February 1990 (age 36) Etterbeek, Belgium
- Listed height: 6 ft 4 in (1.93 m)
- Listed weight: 199 lb (90 kg)

Career information
- NBA draft: 2012: undrafted
- Playing career: 2011–present

Career history
- 2011–2016: Telenet Oostende
- 2016–2018: BCM Gravelines
- 2018–2020: Strasbourg IG
- 2020–2021: Bilbao Basket
- 2021–2022: Boulazac Basket Dordogne
- 2022–2026: Limburg United

Career highlights
- Leaders Cup winner (2019); 5× Belgian League champion (2012–2016); 4× Belgian Cup winner (2013–2016); Belgian Player of the Year (2016); Belgian League Best Young Player (2011)

Quentin Serron (born 25 February 1990) is a Belgian basketball player who last played for Limburg United of the BNXT League. Serron plays as point guard or shooting guard.

== Professional career ==
Serron started his professional career in the 2010–11 season, with Telenet Oostende. After his rookie season, he was named the BLB Most Promising Player of the Year.

In June 2016, Serron signed in France with BCM Gravelines. He averaged 8.6 points, 3.6 rebounds and 3.6 assists per game. On 5 July 2018 he signed a two-year deal with Strasbourg IG. In the 2019–20 season, he averaged 4.5 points and 1.4 assists per game.

On 26 February 2020 he signed with Bilbao Basket of the Liga ACB. Serron averaged 5.7 points and 2.7 rebounds per game in seven games. On 1 July he re-signed with the team to a two-year deal.

On 26 August 2021 he signed with Boulazac Basket Dordogne of the LNB Pro B.

On 1 September 2022 he signed with Limburg United of the BNXT League.

== International career ==
He represented Belgium at the EuroBasket 2015 where they lost to Greece in eighth finals with 75–54.

== Honours ==
=== Club ===
Telenet Oostende

- Belgian League (5): 2011–12, 2012–13, 2013–14, 2014–15, 2015–16
- Belgian Cup (4): 2012–13, 2013–14, 2014–15, 2015–16

=== Individual ===
- BLB Most Promising Player of the Year: 2010–11
