= 2014 Belgian Basketball Supercup =

Telenet Oostende	Port of Antwerp Giants
103	62
	1	2	3	4	Total
Telenet Oostende	29	28	25	21	103
Port of Antwerp Giants	15	15	13	19	62
- Date: September 28, 2014
- Venue: De Stormmeeuw, Knokke

The 2014 Belgian Basketball Supercup, for sponsorship reasons the Generali Supercup, was the 18th edition of the game since its official foundation of the actual cup in 1997. It was traditionally played in De Stormmeeuw, in Knokke. The 2013–14 Champion and Cup winner Telenet Oostende won its fourth Supercup, by crushing Port of Antwerp Giants 103–62.

== Match ==
28 September 2014
15:00

Boxscore

Telenet Oostende	103–62	Port of Antwerp Giants
Scoring by quarter: 29–15, 28–15, 25–13, 21–19
Pts: Serron 14; Rebs: Echenique 9 Asts: Đorđević 7		Pts: Archibeque 15; Rebs: Mwema 4 Asts: Pearson 5

De Stormmeeuw, Knokke

Oostende	Antwerp Giants
