= Jorn Steinbach =

Belgian basketball player

Personal information
- Born: January 20, 1989 (age 36) Ghent, Belgium
- Listed height: 5 ft 11 in (1.80 m)

Career information
- NBA draft: 2011: undrafted
- Playing career: 2008–2014
- Position: Point guard
- Number: 4

Career history
- 2009–2012: Okapi Aalstar
- 2012–2014: Spirou Charleroi

Career highlights
- Belgian Player of the Year (2012); Belgian League Most Promising Player of the Year (2010); Belgian Cup winner (2012)

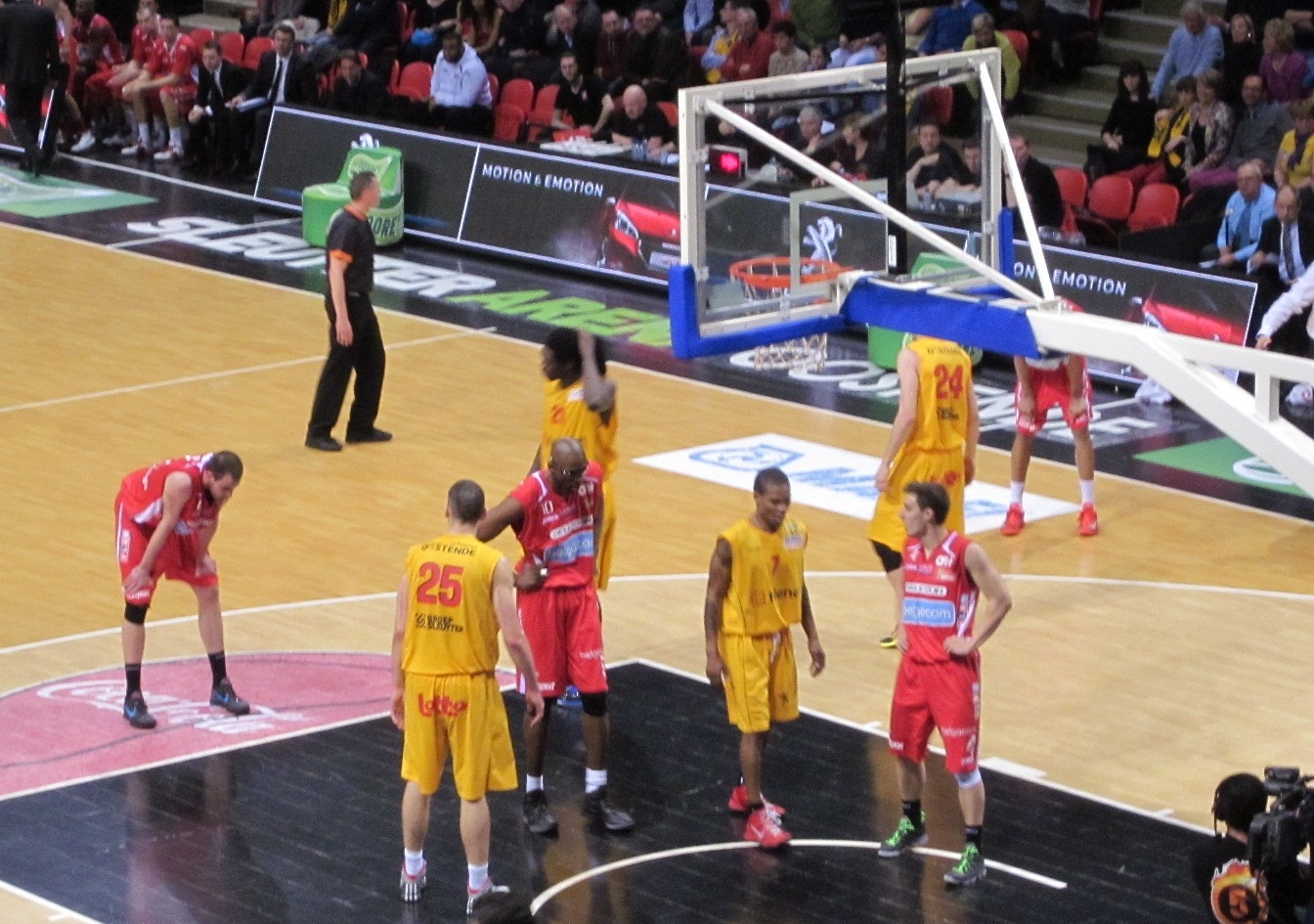
Basketball match: BC Telenet Oostende (yellow) - Belgacom Spirou Charleroi (red) in the Sleuyter Arena, Ostend

Jorn Steinbach (born 20 January 1989) is a former Belgian professional basketball player.

== Professional career ==
Steinbach made his debut in the Tweede Nationale (the Belgian second division) for Waregem. In March 2009 he signed a contract with professional club Okapi Aalstar for the rest of the season. Steinbach won the Belgian Cup in 2011–12, the season in which he had a breakthrough campaign. Steinbach averaged 10.3 points a game for Okapi and was named Belgian Player of the Year.

He signed a 2-year contract with Spirou Charleroi at the start of the 2012–13 season.

Steinbach retired at the age of 26 after several hip operations which ended his career.

== Honours ==
- Belgian League Most Promising Player of the Year: (2010)
- Belgian Cup Champion (1): (2012)
- Belgian Player of the Year (1): (2012)
