= Maxime De Zeeuw =

Belgian basketball player (born 1987)

Free Agent
- Position: Power forward

Personal information
- Born: 26 April 1987 (age 39) Uccle, Belgium
- Listed height: 6 ft 9 in (2.06 m)
- Listed weight: 253 lb (115 kg)

Career information
- NBA draft: 2009: undrafted
- Playing career: 2004–present

Career history
- 2004–2005: Brussels
- 2005–2010: Verviers-Pepinster
- 2010–2011: Optima Gent
- 2011–2012: Verviers-Pepinster
- 2012–2014: Antwerp Giants
- 2014–2015: Virtus Roma
- 2015–2016: ČEZ Nymburk
- 2016–2018: EWE Oldenburg
- 2018–2020: Obradoiro
- 2020–2022: Hapoel Holon
- 2022: Brindisi
- 2022–2024: Limburg United

Career highlights
- Czech League champion (2016); Belgian League Rookie of the Year (2005); Belgian League Young Player of the Year (2009); Belgian Player of the Year (2014)

Maxime De Zeeuw (born 26 April 1987) is a Belgian professional basketball player who last played for Limburg United of the BNXT League. De Zeeuw usually plays at the power forward position. He has also been a member of the Belgian national basketball team, whom he played with at the European championships of 2011, 2013, 2015, and 2017.

== Professional career ==
During the 2013-2014 EuroChallenge campaign with his team Antwerp Giants, De Zeeuw was awarded the title of European Player of the Year and Best Defensive Player of the Year by Eurobasket.com.

De Zeeuw had an impressive 2013–14 season, in which he was named Belgian Player of the Year.

For the 2014–15 season, De Zeeuw signed a contract with Acea Roma of the Italian LBA.

For the 2015–16 season, De Zeeuw signed with the Czech team ČEZ Nymburk of EuroCup.

On 29 June 2016 De Zeeuw signed with EWE Baskets Oldenburg of the Basketball Bundesliga.

On 16 July 2018 De Zeeuw signed a two-year deal with Monbus Obradoiro of the Liga ACB. He averaged 3.4 points and 2.0 rebounds per game in the 2019–20 season.

On 19 September 2020 De Zeeuw signed with Stelmet Zielona Góra of the PLK and the VTB United League. On 28 September 2020, without playing a single game, his contract has been terminated by mutual agreement.

On 23 November 2020 he signed with Hapoel Holon of the Israeli Basketball Premier League.

On 27 January 2022 De Zeeuw signed with New Basket Brindisi of the Lega Basket Serie A.

On 1 July 2022 he signed with Limburg United of the BNXT League.

== International career ==
He represented Belgium at the EuroBasket 2015 where they lost to Greece in eighth finals with 75–54.
