= 2017–18 Pro Basketball League =

Pro Basketball League
- Season: 2017–18
- Dates: 23 September 2017 – 13 June 2018
- Teams: 10

Regular season
- Season MVP: Jean Salumu

Finals
- Champions: Oostende (19th title)
- Runners-up: Telenet Giants Antwerp
- Semifinalists: Proximus Spirou; Okapi Aalstar
- Finals MVP: Tonye Jekiri

Statistical leaders
Points	Miloš Bojović	18.3
Rebounds	Tonye Jekiri	7.3
Assists	Joe Rahon	5.6
Index Rating	Seth Tuttle	17.3

The 2017–18 Pro Basketball League, for sponsorship reasons the EuroMillions Basketball League, was the 91st season of the Belgian Basketball League, first tier of basketball in Belgium. The defending champion was Oostende. The season started on 23 September 2017 and ended 14 June 2018.

== Teams ==
Antwerp Giants changed its name to Telenet Giants Antwerp, following a sponsorship agreement with Telenet. Meanwhile, Telenet left Oostende which meant the sponsored club name disappeared after seven years.

=== Arenas and locations ===
Location of the 2017–18 Belgian Basketball League teams

Club	City	Arena	Capacity
Basic-Fit Brussels	Brussels	Piscine de Neder-Over-Hembeek	1,200
Belfius Mons-Hainaut	Mons	Mons.Arena	4,000
VOO Liège (Note: Liège Basket started the season as "BetFirst Liège Basket", however it changed its name into "VOO Liège Basket" in February 2018.)	Liège	Country Hall	5,000
Crelan Okapi Aalstar	Aalst	Okapi Forum	2,800
Hubo Limburg United	Hasselt	Alverberg Sporthal	1,730
Kangoeroes Willebroek	Willebroek	Sporthal de Schalk	1,000
Oostende	Ostend	Versluys Dôme	5,000
Proximus Spirou	Charleroi	Spiroudome	6,200
Stella Artois Leuven Bears	Leuven	Sportoase	3,400
Telenet Giants Antwerp	Antwerp	Lotto Arena	5,218

=== Personnel and kits ===
Note: Flags indicate national team eligibility at FIBA-sanctioned events. Players may hold other non-FIBA nationalities not displayed.

Team	Manager	Kit manufacturer	Shirt sponsor
Basic-Fit Brussels	(Belgium) Serge Crèvecoeur	Spalding	Basic-Fit Fitness
Belfius Mons-Hainaut	(Belgium) Daniel Goethals	Jako	Belfius
VOO Liège	(Belgium) Laurent Constantiello	Jako	BetFirst
Crelan Okapi Aalstar	(Belgium) Jean-Marc Jaumin	Jartazi	Crelan
Hubo Limburg United	(United States) Ronnie McCollum	K1X	Hubo
Kangoeroes Willebroek	(Croatia) Damir Milačić	Jako	
Oostende	(Croatia) Dario Gjergja	Spalding	
Proximus Spirou	(United States) Brian Lynch	Spalding	Proximus
Stella Artois Leuven Bears	(Belgium) Ferried Naciri		Stella Artois
Telenet Giants Antwerp	(Belgium) Roel Moors	Spalding	Telenet

=== Managerial changes ===
Team	Outgoing manager	Manner of departure	Date of vacancy	Position in table	Replaced by	Date of appointment
Hubo Limburg United	(United States) Brian Lynch	Signed with Proximus Spirou	31 June 2017	Pre-season	(United States) Ronnie McCollum	9 April 2017
Proximus Spirou	(Belgium) Fluvio Bastianini	Mutual consent	19 March 2017	Pre-season	(United States) Brian Lynch	9 April 2017
Hubo Limburg United	(United States) Ronnie McCollum	Fired	17 November 2017	8th (2–6)	(Belgium) Pascal Angillis	17 November 2017

== Regular season ==
In the regular season, teams play against each other home-and-away in a round-robin format. The eight highest placed teams advance to the playoffs. The first games are played on 23 September 2017 and the regular season finishes on 20 May 2018.

=== Standings ===
Pos	Team	Pld	W	L	PF	PA	PD	Pts	Qualification or relegation
1	Oostende	36	29	7	2969	2470	+499	65	Qualification for playoffs
2	Telenet Giants Antwerp	36	27	9	2911	2618	+293	63	Qualification for playoffs
3	Proximus Spirou	36	25	11	2954	2783	+171	61	Qualification for playoffs
4	Crelan Okapi Aalstar	36	23	13	2898	2708	+190	59	Qualification for playoffs
5	Belfius Mons-Hainaut	36	20	16	2870	2886	−16	56	Qualification for playoffs
6	Hubo Limburg United	36	16	20	2889	2903	−14	52	Qualification for playoffs
7	Kangoeroes Willebroek	36	13	23	2826	3111	−285	49	Qualification for playoffs
8	Basic-Fit Brussels	36	12	24	2637	2812	−175	48	Qualification for playoffs
9	VOO Liège	36	8	28	2970	3217	−247	44	
10	Stella Artois Leuven Bears	36	7	29	2628	3044	−416	43	

Source: EuroMillions League

== Playoffs ==
The playoffs start on 26 May and end on 13, 15 or 17 June 2017. The winner of the playoffs is crowned Belgian national champion. In the quarterfinals and semifinals a best-of-three format is used, while the finals are played in a best-of-five format. The higher seeded team had home advantage and played games one, three and five (if possible) at home. Small bold numbers indicate team seeding.

=== Bracket ===
Quarterfinals
1 **Oostende**	**2**
8 Basic-Fit Brussels	0
4 **Okapi Aalstar**	**2**
5 Belfius Mons-Hainaut	1
2 **Telenet Giants Antwerp**	**2**
7 Kangoeroes Willebroek	0
3 **Proximus Spirou**	**2**
6 Hubo Limburg United	0

Semifinals
1 **Oostende**	**2**
4 Okapi Aalstar	0
2 **Telenet Giants Antwerp**	**2**
3 Proximus Spirou	0

Finals
1 **Oostende**	**3**
2 Telenet Giants Antwerp	0

=== Quarterfinals ===
Team 1	Series	Team 2	Game 1	Game 2	Game 3
**Oostende**	2–0	Basic-Fit Brussels	103–62	84–63	
**Okapi Aalstar**	2–1	Belfius Mons-Hainaut	79–81	82–80	81–71
**Telenet Giants Antwerp**	2–0	Kangoeroes Willebroek	76–62	95–65	
**Proximus Spirou**	2–0	Hubo Limburg United	89–62	80–73	

=== Semifinals ===
Team 1	Series	Team 2	Game 1	Game 2	Game 3
**Oostende**	2–0	Okapi Aalstar	82–60	80–64	
**Telenet Giants Antwerp**	2–0	Proximus Spirou	90–80	83–82	

=== Finals ===
Team 1	Series	Team 2	Game 1	Game 2	Game 3	Game 4	Game 5
**Oostende**	3–0	Telenet Giants Antwerp	75–67	74–66	78–67		

== Final standings ==
Pos	Team	Pld	W	L	Qualification or relegation
1	Oostende (C)	43	36	7	Qualification for Champions League regular season
2	Telenet Giants Antwerp	43	31	12	Qualification for Champions League first qualifying round
3	Proximus Spirou	40	27	13	Qualification for Champions League first qualifying round
4	Crelan Okapi Aalstar	41	25	16	
5	Belfius Mons-Hainaut	39	21	18	Qualification for FIBA Europe Cup
6	Hubo Limburg United	38	16	22	
7	Kangoeroes Willebroek	38	13	25	
8	Basic-Fit Brussels	38	12	26	
9	VOO Liège	36	8	28	
10	Stella Artois Leuven Bears	36	7	29	

Source: EuroMillions League
(C) Champions

== Awards ==
=== Individual honours ===
Award	Player	Club	Ref.
Most Valuable Player	(Belgium) Jean Salumu	Oostende	
Belgian Player of the Year	(Belgium) Jean Salumu	Oostende	
Most Promising Player	(Belgium) Thomas Akyazili	Telenet Giants Antwerp	
Coach of the Year	(Croatia) Dario Gjergja	Oostende	

=== All-League Teams ===
All-Offensive Team		All-Defensive Team	
(Serbia) Dušan Đorđević	Oostende	(United States) Paris Lee	Telenet Giants Antwerp
(United States) Garlon Green	Belfius Mons-Hainaut	(United States) Bill Amis	Okapi Aalstar
(Belgium) Jean Salumu	Oostende	(Belgium) Jean Salumu	Oostende
(United States) Chase Fieler	Oostende	(Belgium) Jean-Marc Mwema	Oostende
(United States) Seth Tuttle	Proximus Spirou	(Nigeria) Tonye Jekiri	Oostende

== In European competitions ==
Team	Competition	Progress	Ref
Oostende	Champions League	Regular season	
Telenet Giants Antwerp	Champions League	Regular season	
Proximus Spirou	FIBA Europe Cup	Regular season	
Belfius Mons-Hainaut	FIBA Europe Cup	Second round	
