= Jean Salumu =

Belgian basketball player

Free Agent
- Position: Shooting guard / small forward

Personal information
- Born: 26 July 1990 (age 36) Sint Niklaas, Belgium
- Listed height: 1.93 m (6 ft 4 in)
- Listed weight: 87 kg (192 lb)

Career information
- NBA draft: 2012: undrafted
- Playing career: 2011–present

Career history
- 2009–2011: Oostende
- 2011–2012: Leuven Bears
- 2012–2018: Oostende
- 2018: Sakarya Büyükşehir
- 2018–2019: Varese
- 2019–2020: Pistoia
- 2020–2021: Rasta Vechta
- 2021–2022: Champagne Châlons-Reims
- 2022–2023: Trefl Sopot

Career highlights
- 5× PBL champion (2013–2017); 7× Belgian Cup champion (2010, 2013–2018); BNXT League champion (2024); PBL Most Valuable Player (2018); PBL Belgian Player of the Year (2018); PBL Most Promising Player (2013); PBL All-Offensive Team (2018); PBL All-Defensive Team (2018); Polish Cup winner (2023)

Jean Salumu (born 26 July 1990) is a Belgian professional basketball player who last played for Trefl Sopot of the Polish Basketball League. He also represents the Belgian national basketball team.

In 2018, Salumu was the first Belgian ever to win the Most Valuable Player award of the Belgian domestic league.

== Professional career ==
=== Belgium (2009–2018) ===
Salumu started his career at the highest stage with B.C. Oostende in the 2009–10 season. In 2011–12 he played for the Leuven Bears. For the 2012–13 season he signed with Oostende again. In January 2013 he extended his contract with 2 seasons. After the season, he won the Rookie of the Year/Most Promising Player award.

In May 2018, Salumu was the first ever Belgian player to be named the Belgian League MVP. He was also named to the league's All-Offensive and All-Defensive Team, while also winning the Belgian Player of the Year award. Salumu's MVP season would be his last one with Oostende, as after the season it was announced he was leaving.

=== Sakarya Büyükşehir (2018) ===
On 18 June 2018, it was announced that Salumu had signed with Turkish club Sakarya Büyükşehir.

=== Pallacanestro Varese (2018–2019) ===
Salumu signed with the Pallacanestro Varese of the Lega Basket Serie A on 18 December 2018.

=== Pistoia Basket 2000 (2019–2020) ===
On 16 September 2019 he signed with Pistoia of the Italian Lega Basket Serie A (LBA). Salumu averaged 13.1 points, 2.3 rebounds and 2.0 assists per game.

=== Rasta Vechta (2020–2021) ===
On 22 September 2020 Salumu signed with Rasta Vechta of the Basketball Bundesliga.

=== Champagne Basket (2021–2022) ===
On 13 July 2021 Salumu signed with Champagne Châlons-Reims in the Pro A.

=== Trefl Sopot (2022–2023) ===
On 3 August 2022 he signed with Trefl Sopot of the Polish Basketball League.

== International career ==
He represented Belgium at the EuroBasket 2015, where they lost to Greece in eighth finals with 75–54.

== Honours ==
Telenet Oostende

- Belgian Championship (5): 2012–2013, 2013–2014, 2014–2015, 2015–2016, 2016–2017
- Belgian Cup (6): 2010, 2013, 2014, 2015, 2016, 2017

Individual awards:

- BLB Most Promising Player: 2013

== Trivia ==
His brother Sylvestre is a rapper, better known as Woodie Smalls.
