= Willy Steveniers =

Belgian basketball player and coach

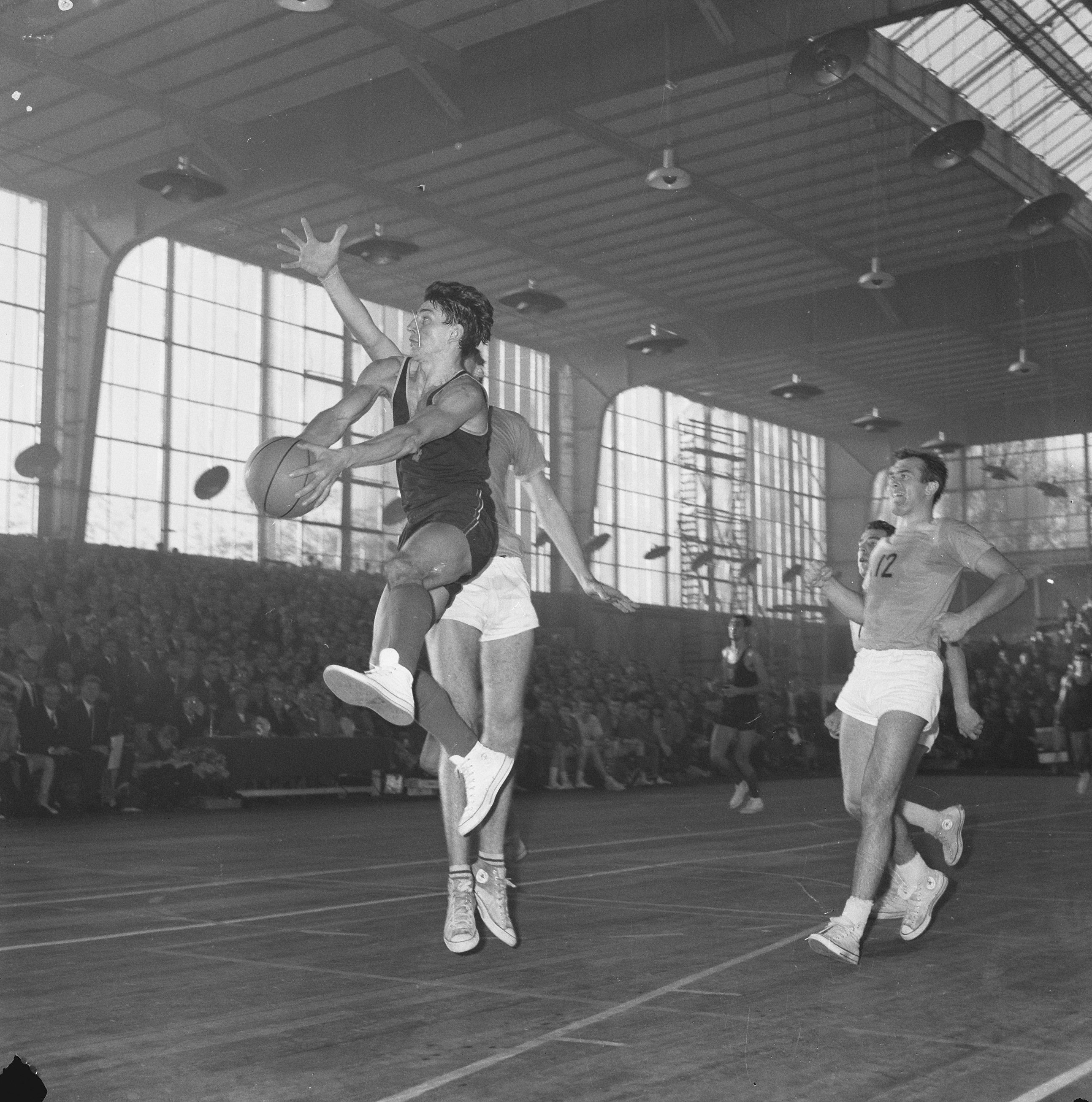
- Steveniers (with the ball), attacks during a Netherlands vs. Belgium game, 7 November 1965.

Personal information
- Born: 12 December 1938 (age 87) Antwerp, Belgium
- Listed height: 1.80 m (5 ft 11 in)
- Listed weight: 84 kg (185 lb)
- Position: Shooting guard

Career history

Playing
- Zaziko Antwerp
- 1962–1968: Racing Mechelen
- 1968–1971: Standard Liege
- Eural Goldfingers
- 1975: Belgium Lions
- Aalst
- Antwerpse
- Royal Fresh Air
- 1979–1980: Racing Mechelen

Coaching
- 2003–2004: Basket Willebroek

Career highlights
- As player: FIBA European Selection (1966); 5× Belgian League champion (1965–1967, 1970, 1980); 3× Belgian Cup winner (1964, 1965, 1969); 4× Belgian Player of the Year (1965–1967, 1970); FIBA's 50 Greatest Players (1991); Best Belgian Basketball Player of the 20th Century; Belgian League Lifetime Achievement Award (2019)

Jean Willem "Willy" Steveniers (born 12 December 1938) is a Belgian former professional basketball player and coach. Standing at 1.80 m (5 ft 11 in) tall, Steveniers played at the shooting guard position.

He was named the Belgian Player of the Year four times. He was named one of FIBA's 50 Greatest Players, in 1991. He is generally considered by most fans and sports journalists to have been the best Belgian basketball player of all time, and he was named The Best Belgian Basketball Player of the 20th Century, and was given the Lifetime Achievement Award by the Belgian League, in 2019.

During his playing career, his nickname was, "The Emperor of Belgian Basketball".

== Club career ==
During his club career, Steveniers played in the Belgian League, with Zaziko Antwerpen, Racing Mechelen, Standard Liege, Eural Goldfingers (Wilrijk), Aalst, Antwerpse, and Royal Fresh Air. He is the Belgian League's all-time top scorer, with 11,870 career points scored. He won the league's championship five times, four times with Racing Mechelen, and once with Standard Liege.

With Standard Liege, he made it to the semifinals of the FIBA European Champions Cup (now called EuroLeague), in the 1968–69 season. He also won the Belgian Cup that season. He was named the Belgian Player of the Year in 1965, 1966, 1967, and 1970. He was named to the FIBA European Selection team, in 1966.

At the age of 21, he was offered an NBA contract, but he turned it down.

== National team career ==
Steveniers was a member of the senior Belgian national basketball team. With Belgium's senior national team, he played in 54 games. He played at the 1959 EuroBasket, and at the 1961 EuroBasket.

== Coaching career ==
After he retired from playing professional basketball, Steveniers became a basketball coach. He was D. J. Mbenga's personal youth coach.
