= Rik Samaey =

Belgian basketball player

Personal information
- Born: 30 August 1960 (age 66) Ostend, Belgium
- Listed height: 2.04 m (6 ft 8 in)

Career information
- Playing career: 1977–1999
- Position: Power forward / center

Career history
- 1977–1985: Sunair Oostende
- 1985–1995: Racing Mechelen
- 1995–1996: RB Antwerp
- 1996–1999: BC Damme

Career highlights
- 12× Belgian League champion (1981, 1982, 1983, 1984, 1985, 1987, 1989, 1990, 1991, 1992, 1993, 1994); 10× Belgian Cup winner (1979, 1981, 1982, 1983, 1985, 1986, 1987, 1990, 1993, 1994); 10× Belgian Player of the Year (1981–1989, 1994); Belgian League Rookie of the Year (1979)

Rik Samaey (born 30 August 1960) is a Belgian former professional basketball player who played as a center. He is widely regarded as one of the greatest players in the history of Belgian basketball, having won multiple national championships and cups and being named Belgian Player of the Year a record of ten times.

== Early life ==
Samaey was born in Ostend, Belgium. In his youth, he initially played football and spent several years with local football clubs, including Club Brugge. At the age of 16, he switched to basketball, where his height and physical presence quickly made him stand out.

== Professional career ==
Samaey began his professional basketball career in 1977 with Sunair Oostende. Standing 2.04 m (6 ft 8 in), he became one of the dominant centers in the Belgian league. During his time with Oostende, he won several Belgian championships and Belgian Cups and established himself as one of the top players in the country.

In 1985, he transferred to Racing Mechelen, where he continued his success. With Mechelen, Samaey won additional national titles and cup trophies and played a key role in the club's domestic dominance during the late 1980s and early 1990s.

After leaving Mechelen in 1995, Samaey played one season with RB Antwerp. He later continued his career in the lower divisions with BC Damme, where he played until his retirement from professional basketball in 1999.

== National team career ==
Samaey was a long-time member of the Belgian national basketball team. He earned 108 international caps and represented Belgium at several major international tournaments, including the EuroBasket championships in 1979 in Italy and 1993 in Germany.

== Style of play ==
Playing as a center, Samaey was known for his strength, positioning, and consistency in the paint. He was a reliable scorer and rebounder and was considered one of the most dominant Belgian players of his era.

== Achievements and awards ==
=== Team ===
(Belgium) BC Oostende

- Belgian League: (gold) 1980–81, 1981–82, 1982–83, 1983–84, 1984–85
- Belgian Cup: (gold) 1978–79, 1980–81, 1981–82, 1982–83, 1984–85

(Belgium) Racing Mechelen

- Belgian League: (gold) 1986–87, 1988–89, 1989–90, 1990–91, 1991–92, 1992–93, 1993–94
- Belgian Cup: (gold) 1985–86, 1986–87, 1989–90, 1992–93, 1993–94

==== Individual ====
- Belgian Rookie of the Year: 1978–79
- Belgian Player of the Year: 1980–81, 1981–82, 1982–83, 1983–84, 1984–85, 1985–86, 1986–87, 1987–88, 1988–89, 1993–94

== Post-playing career ==
After retiring as a player, Samaey remained involved in basketball through youth coaching and media work. He also pursued professional activities outside of sports.

== Personal life ==
His son, Bart Samaey, has also been involved in competitive basketball.

== See also ==
- Belgian Basketball League
- Belgian national basketball team
