= Beghin =

Beghin may refer to:

- Christophe Beghin
- Béghin-Say
