= Jef Eygel =

Belgian basketball player

- Eygel with Racing Mechelen in 1969

Personal information
- Born: 5 March 1933 Antwerp, Belgium
- Died: 3 April 2005 (aged 72) Antwerp, Belgium
- Listed height: 6 ft 0.25 in (1.84 m)
- Listed weight: 175 lb (79 kg)

Career information
- Playing career: 1950–1970
- Position: Point guard

Career history
- 1950–1968: Antwerpse
- 1969–1970: Racing Mechelen

Career highlights
- FIBA European Selection (1964); 7× Belgian League champion (1956, 1959, 1960, 1961, 1962, 1963, 1964); 2× Belgian Cup winner (1961, 1970); 4× Belgian Player of the Year (1959, 1961, 1963, 1964)

Jozef "Jef" Fidelo Eygel (5 March 1933 in Antwerp – 3 April 2005) was a Belgian professional basketball player. At a height of 1.84 m (6'0 1/4") tall, he played at the point guard position. He is regarded as one of Belgium's greatest basketball players.

== Professional career ==
In 1950, Eygel began his professional career with his hometown team Antwerpse. The Belgian guard spent almost two decades with this team and helped Antwerpse to win 7 Belgian League titles. The final season of his career, the 37-year-old Eygel spent with another Belgian team, Racing Mechelen.

In 1958/59 season, Eygel made his EuroLeague debut. In total, he played 8 seasons in the EuroLeague, averaging 14.4 points per game and twice finishing the season in the Top 10 in scoring. He finished his European journey with 517 points in 36 games.

Eygel was a member of the FIBA European Selection, in 1964. He was a four-time Belgian Player of the Year (1959, 1961, 1963, 1964).

== National team career ==
Eygel was a member of the senior Belgian national basketball team since 1951, when he made his debut as an 18-year-old in the Eurobasket. In total, Eygel played in 5 Eurobasket editions (1951, 1959, 1961, 1963, 1967), scoring 270 points in 40 games.

He competed at the 1952 Summer Olympics. He played in all three of Belgium's games during the Olympic tournament, averaging 5.7 points per game. In total, Eygel played a record of 133 times for the national team between 1951 and 1970.

== Awards and accomplishments ==
=== Team ===
(Belgium) Antwerpse BC

- Belgian League: (gold) 1955–56, 1958–59, 1959–60, 1960–61, 1961–62, 1962–63, 1963–64
- Belgian Cup: (gold) 1960–61

(Belgium) Racing Mechelen

- Belgian Cup: (gold) 1969–70

=== Individual ===
- Gold Medal of Belgian Sporting Merit: 1954
- Belgian Player of the Year: 1958–59, 1960–61, 1962–63, 1963–64
- FIBA European Selection: 1964
