= 2015–16 Basketball League Belgium Division I =

Scooore! League^{1}
- Season: 2015–16
- Duration: October 2, 2015 – June 8, 2016
- Games played: 32 or 30
- Teams: 11

Regular season
- Season MVP: (United States) John Tofi

Finals
- Champions: Telenet Oostende (17th title)
- Runners-up: Crelan Okapi Aalstar

Statistical leaders
Points	(Australia) Ben Madgen	19.0
Rebounds	(United States) Killian Larson	9.0
Assists	(Belgium) Niels Marnegrave	5.8
- ^{1} Sponsored league name, referring to Scooore!.

The 2015–16 Basketball League Belgium Division I season, for sponsorships reasons named the Scooore! League, was the 89th season of the first tier of basketball in Belgium. The season started on October 2, 2015 and ended on 8 June 2016. The defending champion was Oostende, and it successfully defended its title.

== Teams ==
Location of the 2015–16 Belgian Basketball League teams

The name of Okapi Aalstar was changed to Crelan Okapi Aalstar due to sponsorship reasons on June 3, 2015.

Club	City	Arena	Capacity	Lic.
Basic-Fit Brussels	Brussels	Piscine de Neder-Over-Hembeek	1,200	B
Hubo Limburg United	Hasselt	Alverberg-sporthal	1,730	A
Belfius Mons-Hainaut	Mons	Mons Arena	4,000	A
Kangoroes Willebroek	Willebroek	Sporthal de Schalk	1,000	C
betFirst Liège Basket	Liège	Country Hall Ethias	5,000	A
Crelan Okapi Aalstar	Aalst	Okapi Forum	2,800	A
Port of Antwerp Giants	Antwerp	Lotto Arena	5,218	A
Proximus Spirou	Charleroi	Spiroudome	6,200	A
Stella Artois Leuven Bears	Leuven	Sportoase	3,400	B
Telenet Oostende	Ostend	Sleuyter Arena	5,000	A
VOO Wolves Verviers-Pepinster	Verviers	Halle du Paire	4,000	B

=== Personnel and kits ===
Team	Coach	Kit manufacturer	Shirt sponsor
Basic-Fit Brussels	(Belgium) Serge Crevecoeur	Mass	Basic-Fit
Hubo Limburg United	(United States) Brian Lynch	K1X	Hubo
Belfius Mons-Hainaut	(Belgium) Yves Defraigne	Joma	Belfius
Kangeroes Basket Willebroek	(Belgium) Daniel Goethals	–	–
betFirst Liège Basket	(Italy) Fulvio Bastianini	Jako	betFirst
Crelan Okapi Aalstar	(United States) Brad Dean	Jartazi	Crelan
Port of Antwerp Giants	(Belgium) Paul Vervaeck	Spalding	Port of Antwerp
Proximus Spirou	(Belgium) Jacques Stas	Joma	Proximus
Stella Artois Leuven Bears	(Republic of Ireland) Tom Johnson	Jako	Stella Artois
Telenet BC Oostende	(Croatia) Dario Gjergja	Spalding	Telenet
VOO Verviers-Pepinster Wolves	(Belgium) Thibaut Petit	Peak	VOO

=== Managerial changes ===
Team	Outgoing manager	Manner of departure	Date of vacancy	Position in table	Incoming manager	Date of appointment
Stella Artois Leuven Bears	(Belgium) Jurgen van Meerbeeck	End of contract	–	Pre-season	(Republic of Ireland) Tom Johnson	March 26, 2015
Stella Artois Leuven Bears	(Republic of Ireland) Tom Johnson	Sacked	December 1, 2015	11th	(Belgium) Stefan Sappenberghs	December 1, 2015

== Regular season ==
The regular season started on October 2, 2015 with the game Basic-Fit Brussels–Telenet Oostende.

=== Standings ===
Pos	Team	Pld	W	L	PF	PA	PD	Pts	Qualification
1	Telenet Oostende	28	23	5	2451	2144	+307	51	Qualification to playoffs
2	Proximus Spirou	28	18	10	2235	2142	+93	46	Qualification to playoffs
3	Crelan Okapi Aalstar	28	17	11	2426	2337	+89	45	Qualification to playoffs
4	Hubo Limburg United	28	15	13	2419	2358	+61	43	Qualification to playoffs
5	Port of Antwerp Giants	28	14	14	2354	2272	+82	42	Qualification to playoffs
6	Belfius Mons-Hainaut	30	18	12	2424	2295	+129	48	Qualification to playoffs
7	Basic-Fit Brussels	30	17	13	2544	2423	+121	47	Qualification to playoffs
8	betFIRST Liège	30	14	16	2542	2647	−105	44	Qualification to playoffs
9	Kangoeroes Willebroek	30	10	20	2492	2651	−159	40	
10	VOO Wolves Verviers-Pepinster	30	8	22	2460	2769	−309	38	
11	Stella Artois Leuven Bears	30	6	24	2362	2671	−309	36	

Source: Scooore League

== Playoffs ==
Quarterfinals
1	Telenet Oostende	2
8	betFIRST Liège	0
4	Hubo Limburg United	2
5	Port of Antwerp Giants	0
2	Proximus Spirou	0
7	Basic-Fit Brussels	2
3	Crelan Okapi Aalstar	2
6	Belfius Mons-Hainaut	0

Semifinals
1	Telenet Oostende	3
4	Hubo Limburg United	2
7	Basic-Fit Brussels	2
3	Crelan Okapi Aalstar	3

Finals
1	Telenet Oostende	3
3	Crelan Okapi Aalstar	1

== Awards ==
Player and team awards for the 2015–16 season
Most Valuable Player
- (United States) John Tofi – Crelan Okapi Aalstar
Coach of the Year
- (Belgium) Roel Moors − Port of Antwerp Giants
Player of the Year
- (Belgium) Quentin Serron − Telenet Oostende
Best Young Player
- (Belgium) Hans Vanwijn − Hubo Limburg United
Star of the Coaches
- (United States) John Tofi − Crelan Okapi Aalstar
