= Jean-Marc Mwema =

Belgian basketball player

No. 8 – HLA Alicante
- Position: Small forward / power forward
- League: Primera FEB

Personal information
- Born: 5 December 1989 (age 36) Merksem, Belgium
- Listed height: 6 ft 5 in (1.96 m)
- Listed weight: 230 lb (104 kg)

Career information
- NBA draft: 2011: undrafted
- Playing career: 2009–present

Career history
- 2009–2016: Antwerp Giants
- 2016–2021: Oostende
- 2021–2024: Antwerp Giants
- 2024–present: HLA Alicante

Career highlights
- 5× PBL champion (2017–2021); 4× Belgian Cup winner (2017, 2018, 2021, 2023); PBL Most Promising Player (2012)

Jean-Marc Mwema (born 5 December 1989) is a Belgian professional basketball player who for HLA Alicante of the Spanish Primera FEB. He also represents the Belgian national basketball team.

== Professional career ==
Mwema played a long time for Antwerp Giants, as he played in Antwerp from 2009 until 2016. In the 2011–12 season, Mwema was named the BLB Most Promising Player.

In December 2016, Mwema signed a contract with Telenet Oostende.Jean-Marc Mwema On 19 February 2017, marked the first time Mwema won a title with his team when he won the Belgian Cup. Mwema signed a one-year extension with the team on 28 July 2020. In his five seasons with Oostende, he won the Pro Basketball League (PBL) five consecutive times.

On 5 August 2021, Mwema returned to Antwerp Giants for a second stint, signing a contract for three seasons. On 12 March 2023, Mwema and the Giants won the Belgian Cup after beating BC Oostende in the final.

In August 2024, he signed for HLA Alicante of the Spanish Primera FEB.

== International career ==
He represented Belgium at the EuroBasket 2015, where the team was eliminated in the Round of 16 after a 75–54 loss to Greece.

== Personal life ==
Born in Belgium, Mwema is of Congolese and Ugandan descent.

== Honours ==
Oostende

- Pro Basketball League: 2017, 2018, 2019, 2020, 2021
- Belgian Cup: 2017, 2018, 2021

Individual

- PBL Most Promising Player: 2012
