= 2013–14 Basketball League Belgium Division I =

Basketball League Belgium Division I
- Season: 2013–14
- Duration: 4 October 2013 – 9 June 2014
- Games played: 36
- Teams: 10

Regular season
- Top seed: Telenet Oostende
- Season MVP: (Serbia) Dušan Djordjević

Finals
- Champions: Telenet Oostende; 15th title
- Runners-up: Okapi Aalstar
- Semifinalists: Spirou Charleroi; Belfius Mons-Hainaut

Awards
- Player of the Year: (Belgium) Maxime De Zeeuw

Statistical leaders
Points	(United States) Derek Raivio	18.7
Rebounds	(United States) Jason Love	10.4
Assists	(Belgium) Domien Loubry	4.8
- All statistics correct as of 7 September 2014.

The 2013–14 Basketball League Belgium Division I, for sponsorship reasons the 2013–14 Ethias League, was the 87th season top tier basketball league in Belgium. The season started on October 4, 2013 and finished on June 9, 2014. Telenet BC Oostende won their 3rd straight title by beating Okapi Aalstar 3–2 in the Finals. Dušan Djordjević was named Most Valuable Player.

== Teams ==
2013–14 club locations

Kangoeroes Basket Willebroek and Basic-Fit Brussels made their first Ethias League appearances after playing in the 2e Nationale in the 2012–13 season. Both clubs received a C-licence, which allows the teams to use a lower budget and doesn't allow them to play European but does to participate for three years. After those years they have to get an A or B-licence.

Club	City	Arena	Capacity	Titles
Basic-Fit Brussels	Brussels	Piscine de Neder-Over-Hembeek	1,200	0
Belfius Mons-Hainaut	Mons	Mons Arena	4,000	0
Belgacom Spirou	Charleroi	Spiroudome	6,200	10
Kangoeroes Basket Willebroek	Willebroek	Sporthal de Schalk	1,000	0
Liège Basket	Liège	Country Hall Ethias	5,000	0
Okapi Aalstar	Aalst	Generali Forum	2,800	0
Port of Antwerp Giants	Antwerp	Lotto Arena	5,218	1
Stella Artois Leuven Bears	Leuven	Sportoase	3,400	0
Telenet Oostende	Ostend	Sleuyter Arena	5,000	14
VOO Wolves Verviers-Pepinster	Verviers	Halle du Paire	4,000	0

== Regular season ==
Pos	Team	Pld	W	L	PF	PA	PD	Pts	Qualification or relegation
1	Telenet BC Oostende	36	29	7	3037	2637	+400	65	Semifinals
2	Belfius Mons-Hainaut	36	25	11	2767	2533	+234	61	Semifinals
3	Belgacom Spirou	36	24	12	2986	2795	+191	60	Quarterfinals
4	Liège Basket	36	23	13	2760	2621	+139	59	Quarterfinals
5	Okapi Aalstar	36	22	14	2877	2670	+207	58	Quarterfinals
6	Port of Antwerp Giants	36	19	17	2907	2748	+159	55	Quarterfinals
7	Stella Artois Leuven Bears	36	17	19	2734	2887	−153	53	
8	Basic-Fit Brussels	36	8	28	2901	3185	−284	44	
9	VOO Wolves Verviers-Pepinster	36	7	29	2485	2910	−425	43	
10	Kangoeroes Basket Willebroek	36	6	30	2806	3274	−468	42	

== Playoffs ==
Quarterfinals
4	Liège Basket	1
5	Okapi Aalstar	2
3	Belgacom Spirou	1
6	Port of Antwerp Giants	2

Semifinals
2	Belfius Mons-Hainaut	2
5	Okapi Aalstar	3
1	Telenet BC Oostende	3
6	Port of Antwerp Giants	0

Final
1	Telenet BC Oostende	3
5	Okapi Aalstar	2

=== Finals ===
June 1	Telenet Oostende	86–68	Okapi Aalstar	Sleuyter Arena, Ostend
20:30	Scoring by quarter: 17–16, 19–24, 22–22, 28–6
Belgacom 5	Pts: Dušan Đorđević 19; Rebs: Dušan Đorđević 8 Asts: Đorđević, Marnegrave 4	Boxscore	Pts: John Tofi 24; Rebs: Hanavan, Butler 6 Asts: Derek Raivio 7

June 3	Okapi Aalstar	84–69	Telenet Oostende	Okapi Forum, Aalst
20:30	Scoring by quarter: 29–13, 20–20, 13–14, 22–22
Belgacom 5	Pts: Derek Raivio 30; Rebs: John Tofi 10; Asts: Derek Raivio 4	Boxscore	Pts: Ryan Thompson 24; Rebs: Dušan Đorđević 8 Asts: Dušan Đorđević 3

June 5	Telenet Oostende	91–64	Okapi Aalstar	Sleuyter Arena, Ostend
20:30	Scoring by quarter: 20–15, 24–21, 29–12, 18–16
Belgacom 5	Pts: Jared Berggren 18; Rebs: Jared Berggren 12; Asts: Dušan Đorđević 6	Boxscore	Pts: John Tofi 12; Rebs: Hanavan, Tofi 7 Asts: Derek Raivio 6

June 7	Okapi Aalstar	84–79	Telenet Oostende	Okapi Forum, Aalst
20:30	Scoring by quarter: 19–17, 30–23, 13–18, 22–21
Belgacom 5	Pts: Da'Sean Butler 21; Rebs: 3 players 7 Asts: 3 players 2	Boxscore	Pts: Ryan Thompson 21; Rebs: Wes Wilkinson 7 Asts: Dušan Đorđević 7

June 9	Telenet Oostende	98–61 (Series: Telenet BC Oostende wins series 3–2)	Okapi Aalstar	Sleuyter Arena, Ostend
20:30	Scoring by quarter: 33–13, 21–18, 24–18, 20–12
Belgacom 5	Pts: Ryan Thompson 21; Rebs: Wes Wilkinson 11; Asts: Dušan Đorđević 10	Boxscore	Pts: John Tofi 12; Rebs: Ian Hanavan 9 Asts: Derek Raivio 2

== Awards ==
Most Valuable Player

- (Serbia) Dušan Djordjević (Telenet BC Oostende)

Star of the Coaches

- (United States) Talor Battle (Belfius Mons-Hainaut)

Belgian Player of the Year

- (Belgium) Maxime De Zeeuw (Port of Antwerp Giants)

Coach of the Year

- (Belgium) Fulvio Bastinini (Liège Basket)

Most Promising Player

- (Belgium) Pierre-Antoine Gillet (Telenet BC Oostende)

== Statistical leaders ==
Performance Index Rating

Pos.	Player	Team	Total	PIR
1	(United States) Derek Raivio	Okapi Aalstar	496	20.7
2	(United States) Brandon Ubel	Basic-Fit Brussels	613	19.8
3	(United States) Jason Love	Belfius Mons-Hainaut	698	19.4

Points

Pos.	Player	Team	Total	PPG
1	(United States) Derek Raivio	Okapi Aalstar	449	18.7
2	(United States) Demond Mallet	Belgacom Spirou	649	18.0
3	(United States) Tu Holloway	Stella Artois Leuven Bears	328	17.3

Rebounds

Pos.	Player	Team	Total	RPG
1	(United States) Jason Love	Belfius Mons-Hainaut	375	10.4
2	(Nigeria) Akin Akingbala	VOO Wolves Verviers-Pepinster	171	7.4
3	(United States) Brandon Ubel	Basic-Fit Brussels	227	7.3

Assists

Pos.	Player	Team	Total	APG
1	(Belgium) Domien Loubry	Basic-Fit Brussels	172	4.8
2	(United States) Luke Loucks	Kangoeroes Basket Willebroek	121	4.7
3	(Belgium) Lionel Bosco	Liège Basket	152	4.6

Steals

Pos.	Player	Team	Total	SPG
1	(United States) Tu Holloway	Stella Artois Leuven Bears	47	2.5
2	(United States) Barry Stewart	Port of Antwerp Giants	67	2.1
3	(United States) Bradford Burgess	Stella Artois Leuven Bears	75	2.1

Blocks

Pos.	Player	Team	Total	BPG
1	(Belgium) Kevin Tumba	Stella Artois Leuven Bears	62	1.7
2	(United States) Jason Love	Belfius Mons-Hainaut	37	1.0
3	(United States) Kenneth Simms	Liège Basket	36	1.0
