= Christophe Beghin =

Belgian basketball coach and former player

Antwerp Giants
- Title: Assistant coach
- League: BNXT League

Personal information
- Born: 2 January 1980 (age 46) Schaerbeek, Belgium
- Listed height: 2.06 m (6 ft 9 in)

Career information
- Playing career: 2009–2017
- Position: Power forward / center
- Coaching career: 2017–present

Career history

Playing
- 1999–2004: Oostende
- 2004–2005: Roseto Sharks
- 2005: Spirou Charleroi
- 2005–2007: Verviers-Pepinster
- 2007–2008: Spirou Charleroi
- 2008–2010: Antwerp Giants
- 2010–2017: Spirou Charleroi

Coaching
- 2017–2019: Antwerp Giants (assistant)
- 2019–2022: Antwerp Giants
- 2022–2024: Kortrijk Spurs
- 2024–present: Antwerp Giants (assistant)

Career highlights
- As player: 3× Belgian Player of the Year (2002, 2009, 2010); As coach: 2× Belgian Cup champion (2020, 2026); Belgian League champion (2025–26)

Christophe Beghin (born 2 January 1980) is a Belgian retired basketball player and current coach. Born in Schaerbeek, Beghin had a long and successful professional career in which he was elected Belgium's Player of the Year three times.

Beghin holds the record for most games played with the Belgian national team, with 137 played games.

== Coaching career ==
On 18 June 2019, Beghin was announced as Antwerp Giants head coach after Roel Moors left the club. He coached the team for two seasons, winning the Belgian Cup in 2020. On 14 January 2022, Beghin and Antwerp parted ways.

On 11 March 2022, Beghin signed a two-year contract with Kortrijk Spurs of the Top Division 1.

== Career statistics ==
Legend
GP	Games played	GS	Games started	MPG	Minutes per game
FG%	Field-goal percentage	3P%	3-point field-goal percentage	FT%	Free-throw percentage
RPG	Rebounds per game	APG	Assists per game	SPG	Steals per game
BPG	Blocks per game	PPG	Points per game	PIR	Performance index rating
**Bold**	Career high

=== EuroLeague ===
Year	Team	GP	GS	MPG	FG%	3P%	FT%	RPG	APG	SPG	BPG	PPG	PIR
2001–02	Telindus Oostende	**14**	**10**	**28.4**	**.452**	.000	**.653**	**5.4**	**.5**	**.9**	**.6**	**10.3**	**9.4**
2010–11	Spirou Charleroi	4	0	9.6	.222	.000	.500	1.3	.3	.5	.0	1.3	–0.8
2011–12	Spirou Charleroi	9	9	18.3	.431	**.333**	.607	2.7	.6	.0	.0	7.0	4.6
Career		27	19	22.3	.435	.222	.633	3.9	.6	.5	.3	7.9	6.3
