= 2014–15 Basketball League Belgium Division I =

Scooore! League^{1}
- Season: 2014–15
- Duration: 3 October 2014 – 3 June 2015
- Games played: 32 or 30
- Teams: 11
- TV partner(s): Belgacom 5

Regular season
- Season MVP: (Serbia) Dušan Đorđević

Finals
- Champions: Telenet Oostende (16th title)
- Runners-up: Belfius Mons-Hainaut

Statistical leaders
Points	(United States) Arizona Reid	19.9
Rebounds	(United States) John Fields	11.0
Assists	(Serbia) Dušan Đorđević	5.1

Records
- Highest attendance: 17,135; Antwerp 88–83 Charleroi (31 January 2015)
- ^{1} Sponsored league name, referring to Scooore!.

The 2014–15 Basketball League Belgium Division I, known as the 2014–15 Scooore! League for sponsorship reasons, was the 88th season of the Basketball League Belgium. This season started with 11 clubs, including newly formed team Limburg United. Telenet Oostende was the defending champion.

The 2014–15 season marked the first season of the league without the name Ethias League, after Ethias stopped their sponsoring activities.

== Format ==
Because a new team was added in Limburg United, a new competition format was introduced. The regular season now contained two rounds: in the first round all teams would play 2 matches against each other (one at home, one away). After 20 played games the league will be divided in two groups: the first group contains the teams seeded 1–6 and the second group 7–11. The results of the first round are included in the final standings.

The first 8 teams qualified for the Playoffs, the quarterfinals would be played in a best-of-three format and the Semifinals and Finals in a best-of-five.

== Licenses ==
The licences for the 2014–15 season were announced in April 2014.

A-licenses

- Telenet BC Oostende
- Okapi Aalstar
- Port of Antwerp Giants
- Proximus Spirou
- Belfius Mons-Hainaut
- Liège Basket

B-licenses

- Stella Artois Leuven Bears
- Limburg United
- VOO Wolves Verviers-Pepinster

C-licenses

- Kangoeroes Basket Willebroek
- Basic-Fit Brussels

== Teams ==
Colors	Club	City	Arena	Capacity
	Basic-Fit Brussels	Brussels	Piscine de Neder-Over-Hembeek	1,200
	Limburg United	Hasselt	Alverberg-sporthal	1,730
	Belfius Mons-Hainaut	Mons	Mons Arena	4,000
	Kangoeroes Basket Willebroek	Willebroek	Sporthal de Schalk	1,000
	Liège Basket	Liège	Country Hall Ethias	5,000
	Okapi Aalstar	Aalst	Okapi Forum	2,800
	Port of Antwerp Giants	Antwerp	Lotto Arena	5,218
	Proximus Spirou	Charleroi	Spiroudome	6,200
	Stella Artois Leuven Bears	Leuven	Sportoase	3,400
	Telenet BC Oostende	Ostend	Sleuyter Arena	5,000
	VOO Wolves Verviers-Pepinster	Verviers	Halle du Paire	4,000

== Regular season ==
=== Standings ===
Pos	Team	Pld	W	L	PF	PA	PD	Pts	Qualification
1	Telenet Oostende	30	26	4	2516	2193	+323	56	Qualification for playoffs
2	Okapi Aalstar	30	17	13	2561	2514	+47	47	Qualification for playoffs
3	Belfius Mons-Hainaut	30	17	13	2288	2217	+71	47	Qualification for playoffs
4	Hubo Limburg United	30	16	14	2521	2500	+21	46	Qualification for playoffs
5	Proximus Spirou	30	16	14	2267	2228	+39	46	Qualification for playoffs
6	Port of Antwerp Giants	30	15	15	2568	2540	+28	45	Qualification for playoffs
7	betFIRST Liège Basket	28	15	13	2319	2335	−16	43	Qualification for playoffs
8	VOO Wolves Verviers-Pepinster	28	13	15	2215	2289	−74	41	Qualification for playoffs
9	Kangoeroes Basket Willebroek	28	11	17	2205	2316	−111	39	
10	Basic-Fit Brussels	28	10	18	2248	2319	−71	38	
11	Stella Artois Leuven Bears	28	4	24	2108	2365	−257	32	

Source: Scooore League

=== Results ===
==== First stage ====
Home \ Away	BRU	LIM	MON	WIL	LIE	OKA	AWP	SPI	LEU	OOS	VOO
Basic-Fit Brussels		89–87	80–74	91–96	103–91	94–67	89–99	76–80	73–69	69–84	99–91
Hubo Limburg United	102–88		85–67	76–79	97–81	90–101	107–103	68–84	88–61	82–91	91–76
Belfius Mons-Hainaut	67–70	81–60		87–71	79–74	72–68	76–84	73–69	77–59	59–72	102–65
Kangoeroes Basket Willebroek	86–95	82–90	77–93		76–81	82–71	98–104	78–75	80–86	70–100	81–82
Liège Basket	83–79	80–84	77–87	86–76		109–111	82–80	82–71	89–70	61–89	79–78
Okapi Aalstar	93–85	97–76	88–75	92–83	80–77		104–77	83–95	105–79	91–85	97–92
Port of Antwerp Giants	108–78	68–75	85–64	90–77	79–78	91–69		88–83	97–91	67–79	77–73
Proximus Spirou	88–78	67–73	65–43	80–69	74–79	83–70	80–68		74–59	75–69	69–73
Stella Artois Leuven Bears	78–76	108–111	59–102	86–75	81–84	70–82	71–81	73–80		82–86	85–89
Telenet BC Oostende	73–72	84–70	86–91	87–77	84–70	97–81	91–80	91–72	85–76		85–66
VOO Wolves Verviers-Pepinster	81–84	70–76	74–78	95–88	81–75	88–68	78–101	71–66	85–74	65–79	

Legend: Blue = home team win; Red = away team win.

==== Second stage ====
Home \ Away	LIM	MON	OKA	AWP	SPI	OOS
Hubo Limburg United		70–78	84–71	95–98	105–90	81–64
Belfius Mons-Hainaut	84–71		79–73	74–79	59–64	64–76
Okapi Aalstar	112–79	88–80		102–93	101–74	76–79
Port of Antwerp Giants	85–91	84–92	86–90		77–84	94–97
Proximus Spirou	72–71	61–75	70–56	85–66		70–74
Telenet BC Oostende	89–86	83–56	90–74	87–79	80–67	

Legend: Blue = home team win; Red = away team win.

Home \ Away	BRU	WIL	LIE	LEU	VOO
Basic-Fit Brussels		84–85	86–98	86–78	94–91
Kangoeroes Basket Willebroek	99–82		98–107	79–73	72–64
Liège Basket	89–87	79–101		86–83	88–68
Stella Artois Leuven Bears	82–74	83–87	72–74		73–80
VOO Wolves Verviers-Pepinster	81–64	79–82	81–80	80–77	

Legend: Blue = home team win; Red = away team win.

== Playoffs ==
Quarterfinals
1	Telenet Oostende	2
8	Verviers-Pepinster	0
4	Hubo Limburg United	0
5	Proximus Spirou	2
2	Okapi Aalstar	2
7	betFIRST Liège Basket	1
3	Belfius Mons-Hainaut	2
6	Port of Antwerp Giants	1

Semifinals
1	Telenet Oostende	3
5	Spirou Charleroi	1
2	Okapi Aalstar	1
3	Belfius Mons-Hainaut	3

Finals
1	Telenet Oostende	3
3	Belfius Mons-Hainaut	1

== Awards ==
Awards	Player	Team
MVP	(Serbia) Dušan Đorđević	Telenet Oostende
Coach of the Year	(United States) Brian Lynch	Limburg United
Belgian Player of the Year	(Belgium) Pierre-Antoine Gillet	Telenet Oostende
Most Promising Player	(Belgium) Vincent Kesteloot	Okapi Aalstar
Star of the Coaches	(Serbia) Dušan Đorđević	Telenet Oostende

== See also ==
- 2014–15 Belgian Basketball Cup
