= R.C. Mechelen =

Racing Club Mechelen
- Founded: 1940
- Dissolved: 1995
- Arena: Winketkaai
- Capacity: 2,000
- Location: Mechelen, Belgium
- Team colors: Green, White
- Championships: 15 Belgian Championships; 9 Belgian Cups; 5 Belgian Supercups
Home	Away

Racing Club Mechelen, or Racing Club Malines, was a Belgian professional basketball club from the city of Mechelen, Belgium. It was the men's basketball section of K.R.C. Mechelen. For sponsorship reasons, the club was also known as Maes Pils from the 1970s until the 1990s.

== History ==
Founded in the 1940, the basketball section of KRC Mechelen obtained the number 71. The greatest period of the club was in the second part of the 20th century competing against other powerful clubs like RC Mechelen, Antwerpse BC and Bus Fruit Lier from the largest cities of the Antwerp Province.

From the end of the 1960s until the end of the 1970s, RC Mechelen was always present as main rivals to the Standard BC Liège club and the Brussels side Fresh Air Basketball , BC Oostende in the 1980s, and Spirou Basket Club in the 1990s.

In total, the club won 24 Trophies between 1964 and 1994: 15 Belgian Championships and 9 Belgian Cups. Maes Pils also reached the final of the Korać Cup in 1973 where they were beaten by Italian side Pallacanestro Cantù.

R.C. Mechelen folded and merged with Sobabee to create Racing Basket Antwerpen, in 1995. Until it was dissolved, the club's senior team was the most successful Belgian basketball club, after having won a total of 15 Belgian national championships, 9 Belgian Cups, and 5 Belgian SuperCups.

== Arena ==
R.C. Mechelen played its home games in Mechelen, at the Winketkaai arena.

== Titles and honors ==
=== Domestic competitions ===
- Belgian League

Champions (15): 1964–65, 1965–66, 1966–67, 1968–69, 1973–74, 1974–75, 1975–76, 1979–80, 1986–87, 1988–89, 1989–90, 1990–91, 1991–92, 1992–93, 1993–94
Runners-up: 1980-81, 1982-83, 1984-85

- Belgian Cup

Winners (9): 1963–64, 1964–65, 1969–70, 1970–71, 1985–86, 1986–87, 1989–90, 1992–93, 1993–94
Runners-up (1): 1968-69

- Belgian Supercup

Winners (5): 1990, 1991, 1992, 1993, 1994
Runners-up : 1989

- Belgian Second division

Champions (1): 1960–61

=== European competitions ===
- FIBA Korać Cup

Runners-up (1): 1973

== Notable players ==
Note: Flags indicate national team eligibility at FIBA-sanctioned events. Players may hold other non-FIBA nationalities not displayed.

Criteria

To appear in this section a player must have either:

- Set a club record or won an individual award while at the club
- Played at least one official international match for their national team at any time
- Played at least one official NBA match at any time.

- (United States) Jim Fox 1966–1967
- (Puerto Rico) Teófilo Cruz 1969–1970
- (United States) Ed Murphy 1979–1981
- (Belgium) Ronny Bayer 1985–1990
- (Belgium) Jef Eygel 1969–1970
- (Belgium) Éric Struelens 1988–1995
- (United States) Bill Varner 1988–1995
- (Belgium) Jacques Stas 1992–1995
- (United States) Rick Raivio 1985–1987
- (Belgium) Rik Samaey 1985–1990
