= 2019–20 Pro Basketball League =

Pro Basketball League
- Season: 2019–20
- Dates: 13 September 2019 – 13 March 2020 (Note: The 2019–20 season was ended on 13 March 2020, Oostende were named champions based on standings at that time.)
- Games played: 196
- Teams: 10

Finals
- Champions: Oostende (21st title)
- Runners-up: Belfius Mons-Hainaut

Statistical leaders
Points	Hugh Robertson	19.6
Rebounds	Marin Marić	8.8
Assists	Luka Rupnik	6.0
Index Rating	Hugh Robertson	23.4

The 2019–20 Pro Basketball League, for sponsorship reasons the EuroMillions Basketball League, season was the 93rd season of the Pro Basketball League (PBL), first tier of basketball in Belgium. The season started on 13 September 2019 and was stopped abruptly in March 2020 due to the COVID-19 pandemic. On 13 March 2020, the Belgian Basketball Association decided, in agreement with all participating clubs, to end the season rather than assume the postponed matches could still be played, taking the current standings as final. As such, Oostende won their 21st title.

== Format ==
For the regular season, teams will be divided into two five-team groups according to their positions in the previous season. Teams qualified in positions 1, 3, 5, 7 and 9 joined the Group A while the rest will compose the Group B.

Firstly, all teams will face each other of their group once home and away while in a second round, every PBL team will play each other home and away.

== Teams ==
The same tean teams from the previous season joined the competition.

=== Arenas and locations ===
Location of the 2019–20 Pro Basketball League teams

Club	City	Arena	Capacity
Phoenix Brussels	Brussels	Piscine de Neder-Over-Hembeek	1,200
Belfius Mons-Hainaut	Mons	Mons Arena	4,000
Crelan Okapi Aalstar	Aalst	Okapi Forum	2,800
Hubo Limburg United	Hasselt	Sporthal Alverberg	1,730
Kangoeroes Mechelen	Mechelen	Winketkaai	1,500
Filou Oostende	Ostend	Versluys Dôme	5,000
Spirou	Charleroi	Dôme	6,200
Stella Artois Leuven Bears	Leuven	Sportoase	3,400
Telenet Giants Antwerp	Antwerp	Lotto Arena	5,218
VOO Liège	Liège	Country Hall	5,000

=== Personnel and jerseys ===
Team	Head coach	Captain	Kit manufacturer	Main sponsor
Antwerp Giants	(Belgium) Christophe Beghin	(United States) Dave Dudzinski	Spalding	Telenet
Kangoeroes Mechelen	(Belgium) Paul Vervaeck		Spalding	Coca-Cola / StanleyBet / PMC
Leuven Bears	(Belgium) Eddy Casteels	(United States) Hugh Robertson	Spalding	Stella Artois
Liège Basket	(Belgium) Sacha Massot	(Serbia) Miloš Bojović	Spalding	VOO
Limburg United	(United States) Brian Lynch	(Belgium) Wen Mukubu	K1X	Hubo
Mons-Hainaut	(Bosnia and Herzegovina) Vedran Bosnić	(United States) Justin Cage	Olympic	Belfius
Okapi Aalstar	(Belgium) Yves Defraigne	(Belgium) Senne Geukens	Spalding	Crelan
Oostende	(Croatia) Dario Gjergja	(Serbia) Dušan Đorđević	Spalding	Filou
Phoenix Brussels	(Belgium) Laurent Monier (ad. int.)	(Belgium) Guy Muya	Macron	
Spirou	(Belgium) Sam Rotsaert (ad. int.)	(Belgium) Alex Libert	Spalding	Telenet

== Regular season ==
=== First round ===
==== Group A ====
Pos	Team	Pld	W	L	PF	PA	PD	Pts
1	Telenet Giants Antwerp	7	5	2	570	503	+67	12
2	Belfius Mons-Hainaut	7	5	2	478	477	+1	12
3	Crelan Okapi Aalstar	8	4	4	633	613	+20	12
4	Stella Artois Leuven Bears	8	3	5	629	664	−35	11
5	Spirou	8	2	6	616	669	−53	10

Updated to match(es) played on 7 December 2019. Source: EuroMillions League

==== Group B ====
Pos	Team	Pld	W	L	PF	PA	PD	Pts
1	Filou Oostende	8	7	1	661	546	+115	15
2	Hubo Limburg United	8	7	1	683	585	+98	15
3	Phoenix Brussels	8	3	5	611	593	+18	11
4	Kangoeroes Mechelen	8	3	5	563	588	−25	11
5	VOO Liège	8	0	8	502	708	−206	8

Source: EuroMillions League

=== Second round ===
Pos	Team	Pld	W	L	PF	PA	PD	Pts	Qualification
1	Filou Oostende (C)	17	13	4	1456	1216	+240	30	Qualification for Champions League (Note: Initially, the first eight teams would qualify for the playoffs. However, due to the interruption of the league, the playoffs were suspended. As first club in the standings, BC Oostende qualifies for the 2020–21 Basketball Champions League.)
2	Belfius Mons-Hainaut	17	12	5	1265	1222	+43	29	Qualification for Champions League qualifying round
3	Telenet Giants Antwerp	17	11	6	1410	1271	+139	28	Qualification for EuroCup
4	Hubo Limburg United	17	10	7	1391	1321	+70	27	
5	Spirou	17	9	8	1382	1380	+2	26	
6	Stella Artois Leuven Bears	17	8	9	1334	1363	−29	25	
7	Kangoeroes Mechelen	17	8	9	1231	1241	−10	25	
8	Crelan Okapi Aalstar	17	7	10	1247	1238	+9	24	
9	Phoenix Brussels	17	6	11	1299	1278	+21	23	
10	VOO Liège	17	1	16	1071	1556	−485	18	

Updated to match(es) played on 9 March 2020. Source: EuroMillions League
(C) Champions

=== Results ===
Home \ Away	MON	OOS	LIM	MEC	BRU	SPI	LEU	ANT	OKA	LIE	MON	OOS	LIM	MEC	BRU	SPI	LEU	ANT	OKA	LIE
Belfius Mons-Hainaut	—	—	—	—	—	78–58	82–99		68–67	—	—	80–68	73–72				72–99	91–88		
Filou Oostende	—	—	73–66	95–73	74–62	—	—	—	—	102–62		—			86–56	93–99	95–82	85–77	88–70	
Hubo Limburg United	—	78–75	—	73–69	104–99	—	—	—	—	93–57		69–92	—	84–90					68–62	
Kangoeroes Mechelen	—	70–75	73–78	—	57–79	—	—	—	—	71–59	81–76	79–78		—		90–98	63–73	87–95		102–77
Phoenix Brussels	—	75–77	71–79	61–74	—	—	—	—	—	77–62	62–77		71–80	72–76	—		88–69		89–75	
Spirou	58–64	—	—	—	—	—	84–94	76–100	77–85	—	90–69		86–76		82–67	—			84–83	
Stella Artois Leuven Bears	57–65	—	—	—	—	83–91	—	77–94	91–78	—			74–84			88–79	—	83–80		79–56
Telenet Giants Antwerp	70–52	—	—	—	—	70–84	84–60	—	81–69	—			101–90		77–70	86–72		—		92–46
Crelan Okapi Aalstar	68–69	—	—	—	—	95–88	86–68	85–71	—	—	73–83			91–72			82–58	68–85	—	84–64
VOO Liège	—	60–90	68–112	68–76	66–87	—	—	—	—	—		58–110	87–85		63–113	59–76			70–101	—

Updated to match(es) played on 9 March 2020. Source: EuroMillions Basketball League
Legend: Blue = home team win; Red = away team win.

== Play-offs ==
Quarterfinals and semifinals were scheduled to be played in a best-of-three games format, while the finals would be held in a best-of-five (1-1-1-1-1) format. However, due to the COVID-19 pandemic these were not held at all.

== Individual awards ==
=== MVP of the Week ===
Round	Player	Team	PIR	Ref.
1	(Croatia) Marin Marić	Okapi Aalstar	35	

== In European competitions ==
Team	Competition	Progress
Oostende	Champions League	Round of 16
Telenet Giants Antwerp	Champions League	Regular season
Proximus Spirou	FIBA Europe Cup	Second round
Phoenix Brussels	FIBA Europe Cup	Regular season
