= Antwerpse B.C. =

Sobabee
- Founded: 1910
- Dissolved: 1995
- History: Antwerpse B.C. (1910–1972); Racing Basket Antwerpen (1972–1973); Racing Ford Antwerpen (1973–1974); Racing Thorens Antwerpen (1974–1975); Sobabee (1975–1995)
- Location: Antwerp, Belgium
- Championships: 8 Belgian Championships

Antwerpse Basketball Club was a professional basketball club based in the city of Antwerp, Belgium.

== History ==
Antwerpse was founded in May 1910 Jos De Combe Sr. and became a very successful club in Belgian basketball mostly from the mid-'50s to the mid-'70s winning eight titles in the BLB Belgian Cup twice. The women's team also won seven national titles.

In 1972 the club changed its official name to Racing Basket Antwerpen. In the next season (1973–74) it adopted for sponsorship reasons the name Racing Ford Antwerpen, and then Racing Thorens Antwerpen. In 1975 In 1975 the club moved to Lier for one season and played under the name Immo Scheers Lier. In 1976 the club moved back to Antwerp and merged with various Antwerp clubs such as Zaziko, Brabo, Tunnel and other teams which formed a new club with the name Sobabee. At the end of the 1982-83 season, the debt-laden club was forced to sell out players and remain inactive for the following season. From the 1984-1985 season they played in the second division.

Finally in 1995 Sobabee merged with the other legendary club of Belgian basketball, Racing Mechelen, and created a new club based in Antwerp which now is known as Antwerp Giants.

== Honours and achievements ==
Belgian League

- Champions (8): 1955–56, 1958–59, 1959–60, 1960–61, 1961–62, 1962–63, 1963–64, 1972–73

Belgian Cup

- Winners (3): 1960–61, 1971–72, 1973–74
- Runners-up (2): 1955–56, 1958–59

Second division (1):

- Champions: 1979-80

== European participations ==
The club has competed for 9 seasons in European competitions organized by FIBA Europe from 1958 until 1974.

- FIBA Euroleague/Suproleague : 7 times (1958–59, 1959–60, 1960–61, 1961–62, 1962–63, 1963–64, 1973–74)
- Cup Winners' Cup: 2 times (1972–73, 1974–75)

== Rivalries ==
A well-known rivalry was the city derby against Zaziko BBC, an Antwerp club founded in 1949.

== Notable players ==
- (United States) Michael Huger
- (Belgium) Willy Steveniers
- (Belgium) Josef du Jardin
- (Belgium) Jef Eygel
