= 2016–17 Pro Basketball League =

Basketball tournament

EuroMillions Basketball League
- Season: 2016–17
- Teams: 10

Regular season
- Season MVP: (United States) Jason Clark

Finals
- Champions: Telenet Oostende (18th title)
- Runners-up: Basic-Fit Brussels
- Semifinalists: Proximus Spirou; Port of Antwerp Giants

Statistical leaders
Points	(United States) Codi Miller-McIntyre	17.2
Rebounds	(United States) Ryan Anderson	8.5
Assists	(United States) Codi Miller-McIntyre	5.8
Index Rating	(United States) Codi Miller-McIntyre	19.9

The 2016–17 Pro Basketball League (PBL), for sponsorship reasons the EuroMillions Basketball League, season was the 90th season of the first tier of basketball in Belgium. The defending champion was Oostende, which successfully defended its title.

On September 4, it was announced that the new name of the league would be EuroMillions Basketball League.

== Teams ==
VOO Wolves Verviers-Pepinster withdrew from the league, because of a financial disability to participate.

=== Arenas and locations ===
Location of the 2016–17 Belgian Basketball League teams

Club	City	Arena	Capacity
Basic-Fit Brussels	Brussels	Piscine de Neder-Over-Hembeek	1,200
Hubo Limburg United	Hasselt	Alverberg Sporthal	1,730
Belfius Mons-Hainaut	Mons	Mons.Arena	4,000
Kangoeroes Willebroek	Willebroek	Sporthal de Schalk	1,000
betFirst Liège	Liège	Country Hall Ethias	5,000
Crelan Okapi Aalstar	Aalst	Okapi Forum	2,800
Port of Antwerp Giants	Antwerp	Lotto Arena	5,218
Proximus Spirou	Charleroi	Spiroudome	6,200
Stella Artois Leuven Bears	Leuven	Sportoase	3,400
Telenet Oostende	Ostend	Versluys Dôme	5,000

=== Personnel and sponsors ===
Team	Head coach	Manufacturer	Sponsors
Basic-Fit Brussels	(Belgium) Serge Crevecoeur	Mass	Basic-Fit
Hubo Limburg United	(United States) Brian Lynch	K1x	Hubo
Belfius Mons-Hainaut	(Belgium) Yves Defraigne	Joma	Belfius
Kangoeroes Wilebroek	(Belgium) Daniel Goethals		
betFirst Liège	(Belgium) Thibaut Petit	Jako	betFirst
Crelan Okapi Aalstar	(United States) Brad Dean	Jartazi	Crelan
Port of Antwerp Giants	(Belgium) Roel Moors	Spalding	Port of Antwerp
Proximus Spirou	(Italy) Fulvio Bastianini	Joma	Proximus
Stella Artois Leuven Bears	(Belgium) Stefan Sappenberghs	Jako	Stella Artois
Telenet Oostende	(Croatia) Dario Gjergja	Spalding	Telenet

== Regular season ==
=== League table ===
Pos	Team	Pld	W	L	PF	PA	PD	Pts	Qualification
1	Telenet Oostende	36	30	6	2918	2559	+359	66	Qualification to playoffs
2	Port of Antwerp Giants	36	22	14	2977	2822	+155	58	Qualification to playoffs
3	Basic-Fit Brussels	36	22	14	2884	2792	+92	58	Qualification to playoffs
4	Crelan Okapi Aalstar	36	19	17	3030	3024	+6	55	Qualification to playoffs
5	Proximus Spirou	36	18	18	2857	2849	+8	54	Qualification to playoffs
6	Hubo Limburg United	36	18	18	2974	2922	+52	54	Qualification to playoffs
7	Belfius Mons-Hainaut	36	18	18	2766	2752	+14	54	Qualification to playoffs
8	Kangoeroes Willebroek	36	18	18	2877	2986	−109	54	Qualification to playoffs
9	Stella Artois Leuven Bears	36	9	27	2814	3103	−289	45	
10	betFirst Liège	36	6	30	2762	3052	−290	42	

Source: EuroMillions Basketball League

== Playoffs ==
The quarterfinals were played in a best-of-three format, while the semifinals and finals were played in a best-of-five playoff format. The higher seeded teams played the first, third and fifth game of the series at home.

Quarterfinals; 17–21 May
1 Telenet Oostende	73	72
8 Kangoeroes Willebroek	62	53
4 Crelan Okapi Aalstar	78	54	63
5 Proximus Spirou	68	86	79
2 Port of Antwerp Giants	73	76
7 Belfius Mons-Hainaut	61	73
3 Basic-Fit Brussels	70	93	95
6 Limburg United	75	80	83

Semifinals; 24 May–1 June
1 Telenet Oostende	80	78	74
5 Proximus Spirou	70	74	56
2 Port of Antwerp Giants	81	71	71	73
3 Basic-Fit Brussels	90	67	74	87

Finals; 7–14 June
1 Telenet Oostende	78	60	78	77
3 Basic-Fit Brussels	70	59	93	64

== Final standings ==
Pos	Team	Pld	W	L	Qualification
1	Telenet Oostende (C)	45	38	7	Qualification to Champions League regular season
2	Basic-Fit Brussels	47	28	19	Qualification to Champions League third qualifying round
3	Port of Antwerp Giants	42	25	17	Qualification to Champions League first qualifying round
4	Proximus Spirou	42	20	22	Qualification to FIBA Europe Cup second qualifying round
5	Crelan Okapi Aalstar	39	20	19	
6	Hubo Limburg United	39	19	20	
7	Belfius Mons-Hainaut	38	18	20	Qualification to FIBA Europe Cup first qualifying round
8	Kangoeroes Willebroek	38	18	20	
9	Stella Artois Leuven Bears	36	9	27	
10	betFirst Liège	36	6	30	

Source: EuroMillions Basketball League
(C) Champions

== Awards ==
=== Most Valuable Player ===
- (United States) Jason Clark – Port of Antwerp Giants

=== Star of the Coaches ===
- (United States) Seth Tuttle – Hubo Limburg United

=== Coach of the Year ===
- (Croatia) Dario Gjergja – Telenet Oostende

=== Belgian Player of the Year ===
- (Belgium) Olivier Troisfontaines – Crelan Okapi Aalstar

=== Young Player of the Year ===
- (Belgium) Ismaël Bako – Leuven Bears
