= 2018–19 Pro Basketball League =

Pro Basketball League
- Season: 2018–19
- Dates: 5 October 2018 – 13 June 2019
- Games played: 196
- Teams: 10

Regular season
- Season MVP: Paris Lee

Finals
- Champions: Filou Oostende (20th title)
- Runners-up: Telenet Giants Antwerp
- Semi-finalists: Limburg United; Basic-Fit Brussels
- Finals MVP: Braian Angola

Statistical leaders
Points	Miloš Bojović	19.0
Rebounds	Ibrahima Fall Faye	8.9
Assists	Paris Lee	5.4
Index Rating	Amin Stevens	17.8

The 2018–19 Pro Basketball League, for sponsorship reasons the EuroMillions Basketball League, season was the 92nd season of the Pro Basketball League (PBL), first tier of basketball in Belgium. The season started on 5 October 2018 and ended 13 June 2019.

Filou Oostende captured its eight consecutive league title after defeating Antwerp Giants in the playoff finals.

== Teams ==
All ten teams from the previous season would return this season. Nine teams got A-licences, which allows for participation in European competitions, while Leuven Bears received a B-licence and therefore could not play in Europe.

Kangoeroes Willebroek moved from Willebroek to the city of Mechelen and changed its name into Kangoeroes Mechelen. BC Oostende changed its name to Filou Oostende for sponsorship reasons.

=== Arenas and locations ===
Location of the 2018–19 Pro Basketball League teams

Club	City	Arena	Capacity
Basic-Fit Brussels	Brussels	Piscine de Neder-Over-Hembeek	1,200
Belfius Mons-Hainaut	Mons	Mons Arena	4,000
Crelan Okapi Aalstar	Aalst	Okapi Forum	2,800
Hubo Limburg United	Hasselt	Sporthal Alverberg	1,730
Kangoeroes Mechelen	Mechelen	Winketaai	1,500
Filou Oostende	Ostend	Versluys Dôme	5,000
Spirou	Charleroi	Dôme	6,200
Stella Artois Leuven Bears	Leuven	Sportoase	3,400
Telenet Giants Antwerp	Antwerp	Lotto Arena	5,218
VOO Liège	Liège	Country Hall	5,000

== Regular season ==
=== Standings ===
Pos	Team	Pld	W	L	PF	PA	PD	Pts	Qualification or relegation
1	Telenet Giants Antwerp	36	30	6	3064	2541	+523	66	Qualification for playoffs
2	Filou Oostende	36	29	7	2890	2419	+471	65	Qualification for playoffs
3	Spirou	36	24	12	2992	2697	+295	60	Qualification for playoffs
4	Basic-Fit Brussels	36	21	15	2936	2825	+111	57	Qualification for playoffs
5	Belfius Mons-Hainaut	36	17	19	2729	2844	−115	53	Qualification for playoffs
6	Hubo Limburg United	36	16	20	3024	3085	−61	52	Qualification for playoffs
7	Crelan Okapi Aalstar	36	14	22	2901	3118	−217	50	Qualification for playoffs
8	Kangoeroes Mechelen	36	12	24	2711	3036	−325	48	Qualification for playoffs
9	Stella Artois Leuven Bears	36	10	26	2526	2841	−315	46	
10	VOO Liège	36	7	29	2743	3143	−400	43	

Source: EuroMillions League

=== Results ===
Home \ Away	BRU	MON	OKA	OOS	LIM	MEC	SPI	LEU	ANT	LIE	BRU	MON	OKA	OOS	LIM	MEC	SPI	LEU	ANT	LIE
Basic-Fit Brussels	—	71–65	88–87	83–84	108–90	92–65	76–73	87–67	86–79	79–71	—	59–76	102–72	67–73	88–81	68–61	79–89	83–65	74–92	82–77
Belfius Mons-Hainaut	67–79	—	91–81	58–91	80–75	100–79	87–90	85–66	69–74	101–78	78–92	—	87–77	63–67	78–85	84–78	73–83	77–76	70–76	67–79
Crelan Okapi Aalstar	94–85	81–87	—	72–65	94–90	86–92	93–91	75–58	71–106	87–66	76–101	81–87	—	73–77	100–84	70–92	61–103	94–72	70–76	108–84
Filou Oostende	58–59	73–51	86–77	—	92–91	80–82	88–82	89–50	88–63	85–61	83–68	96–60	89–69	—	95–70	97–67	96–82	89–50	67–71	100–72
Hubo Limburg United	83–86	85–82	97–78	55–70	—	98–83	79–88	84–64	73–86	91–88	95–76	81–85	104–68	85–81	—	123–84	82–79	90–89	65–85	81–73
Kangoeroes Mechelen	87–97	74–78	78–71	90–74	83–71	—	77–87	75–92	64–93	86–84	66–64	80–72	75–91	59–74	75–78	—	61–71	77–68	42–99	86–84
Spirou Basket	89–80	94–52	87–70	64–65	102–87	85–87	—	77–64	60–72	85–55	101–94	69–74	73–74	77–73	99–80	88–70	—	86–65	80–79	85–87
Stella Artois Leuven Bears	65–88	71–75	69–84	0–20	88–79	76–68	66–76	—	63–90	86–82	90–83	90–85	94–77	64–97	62–72	78–71	64–68	—	67–79	76–78
Telenet Giants Antwerp	84–68	75–57	104–74	44–82	95–85	84–62	80–95	76–69	—	92–68	74–68	89–59	96–69	80–81	95–83	107–78	83–61	85–59	—	109–60
VOO Liège	92–83	78–92	83–84	67–91	69–92	92–83	55–72	83–84	83–84	—	76–93	72–75	83–100	80–93	100–80	84–91	69–101	76–82	76–84	—

Source: EuroMillions League
Legend: Blue = home team win; Red = away team win.

== Play-offs ==
Quarterfinals and semifinals were played in a best-of-three games format, while the finals in a best-of-five (1-1-1-1-1) format.

=== Bracket ===
Quarterfinals
1	Telenet Giants Antwerp	2
8	Kangoeroes Mechelen	0
4	Basic-Fit Brussels	2
5	Belfius Mons-Hainaut	0
2	Filou Oostende	2
7	Okapi Aalstar	0
3	Spirou	0
6	Limburg United	2

Semifinals
1	Telenet Giants Antwerp	2
4	Basic-Fit Brussels	0
2	Filou Oostende	2
6	Limburg United	0

Finals
1	Telenet Giants Antwerp	1
2	Filou Oostende	3
Third place

=== Quarterfinals ===
The team with the higher seed played game one and three (if necessary) at home.

Team 1	Series	Team 2	Game 1	Game 2	Game 3
Telenet Antwerp Giants	2–0	Kangoeroes Basket Mechelen	94–72	87–76	
Filou Oostende	2–0	Crelan Okapi Aalstar	114–64	91–74	
Spirou Basket	0–2	Hubo Limburg United	84–86	101–103	
Basic-Fit Brussels	2–0	Belfius Mons-Hainaut	75–61	75–73	

=== Semifinals ===
The team with the higher seed played game one, two and 5 (if necessary) at home.

Team 1	Series	Team 2	Game 1	Game 2	Game 3
Telenet Antwerp Giants	2–0	Basic-Fit Brussels	80–68	84–63	
Filou Oostende	2–0	Hubo Limburg United	84–73	78–59	

=== Finals ===
The team with the higher seed played game one, three and five (if necessary) at home.

Team 1	Series	Team 2	Game 1	Game 2	Game 3	Game 4	Game 5
Telenet Antwerp Giants	1–3	Filou Oostende	67–73	66–61	57-60	62-69	

== Final standings ==
Pos	Team	Pld	W	L	Qualification or relegation
1	Filou Oostende (C)	44	36	8	Qualification for Champions League regular season
2	Telenet Giants Antwerp (W)	44	35	9	Qualification for Champions League qualifying rounds
3	Spirou	40	26	14	Qualification for FIBA Europe Cup
4	Basic-Fit Brussels	40	23	17	Qualification for FIBA Europe Cup
5	Belfius Mons-Hainaut	38	17	21	
6	Hubo Limburg United	38	16	22	
7	Crelan Okapi Aalstar	38	14	24	
8	Kangoeroes Mechelen	38	12	26	
9	Stella Artois Leuven Bears	36	10	26	
10	VOO Liège	36	7	29	

Source: EuroMillions League
(C) Champions; (W) Belgian Basketball Cup winner

== Belgian clubs in European competitions ==
Team	Competition	Progress
Telenet Antwerp Giants	Champions League	Third position
Filou Oostende	Champions League	Regular season
Filou Oostende	FIBA Europe Cup	Quarterfinals
Spirou Basket	Champions League	Third qualifying round
Spirou Basket	FIBA Europe Cup	Regular season
Belfius Mons-Hainaut	FIBA Europe Cup	Regular season
