= Laure Résimont =

Belgian basketball player (born 1998)

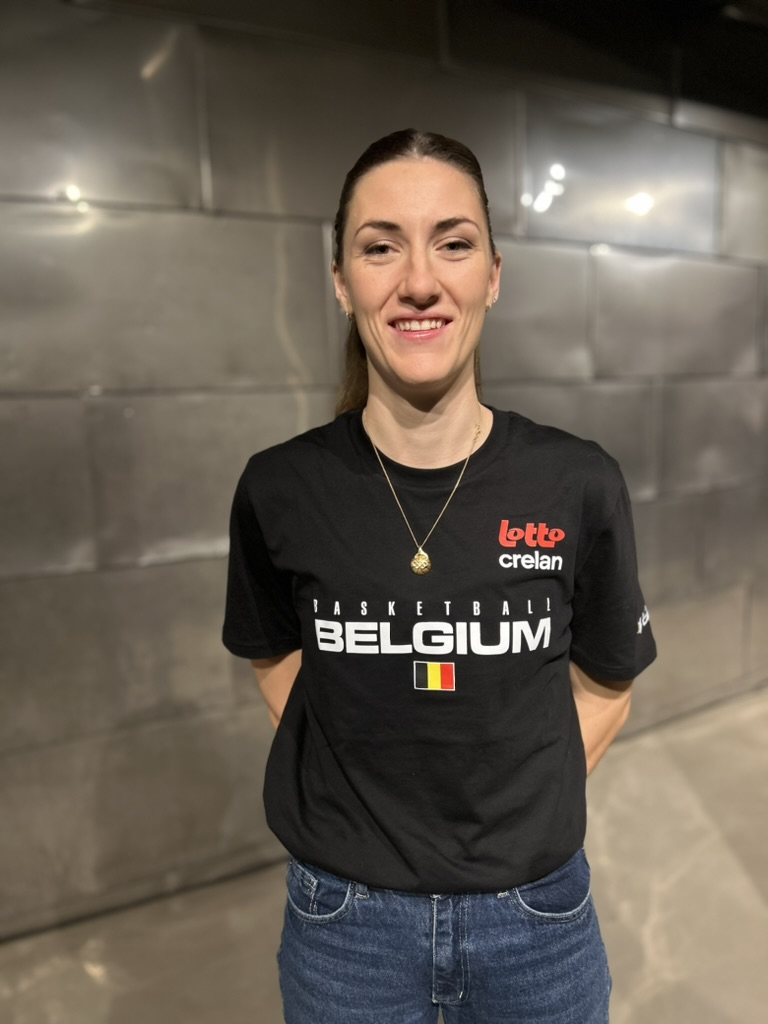

Personal information
- Born: 29 January 1998 (age 28)
- Listed height: 1.85 m (6 ft 1 in)

Career history
- 2019–20: Tarbes Gespe Bigorre
- 2020: BBC Wavre-Sainte-Catherine
- 2020: AE Sedis Bàsquet
- 2021: BBC Wavre-Sainte-Catherine
- 2021–: Kangoeroes Basket Mechelen

Laure Résimont (born 29 January 1998) is a Belgian basketball player. She represented Belgium at the 2024 Summer Olympics. The year before, she had become European champion with her country.

== Honours and awards ==
=== Club ===
==== Kangoeroes Basket Mechelen ====
- Belgian Cup: 2023–24

=== National team ===
- EuroBasket Women: (gold) 2023
- Belgian Sports team of the Year: 2023, 2025

=== Individual ===
- Belgian Promise of the Year: 2017
- Belgian Player of the Year: 2018, 2019, 2024
- Top Division Women 1 MVP: 2018–19
