= Okapi Forum =

Multi-purpose arena in Aalst, Belgium

Coordinates: 50.9398°N 4.0547°E

Okapi Forum is a multi-purpose arena in Aalst, Belgium. Okapi Forum holds room for 2,800 people for basketball games. It hosts the home games of the BNXT League club Okapi Aalst, as well as performances of music artists.

== See also ==
- Sport in Belgium
- Belgian Basketball Cup
- Belgian Basketball Supercup
- Music in Belgium
