= Roel Moors =

Belgian basketball player and coach (born 1978)

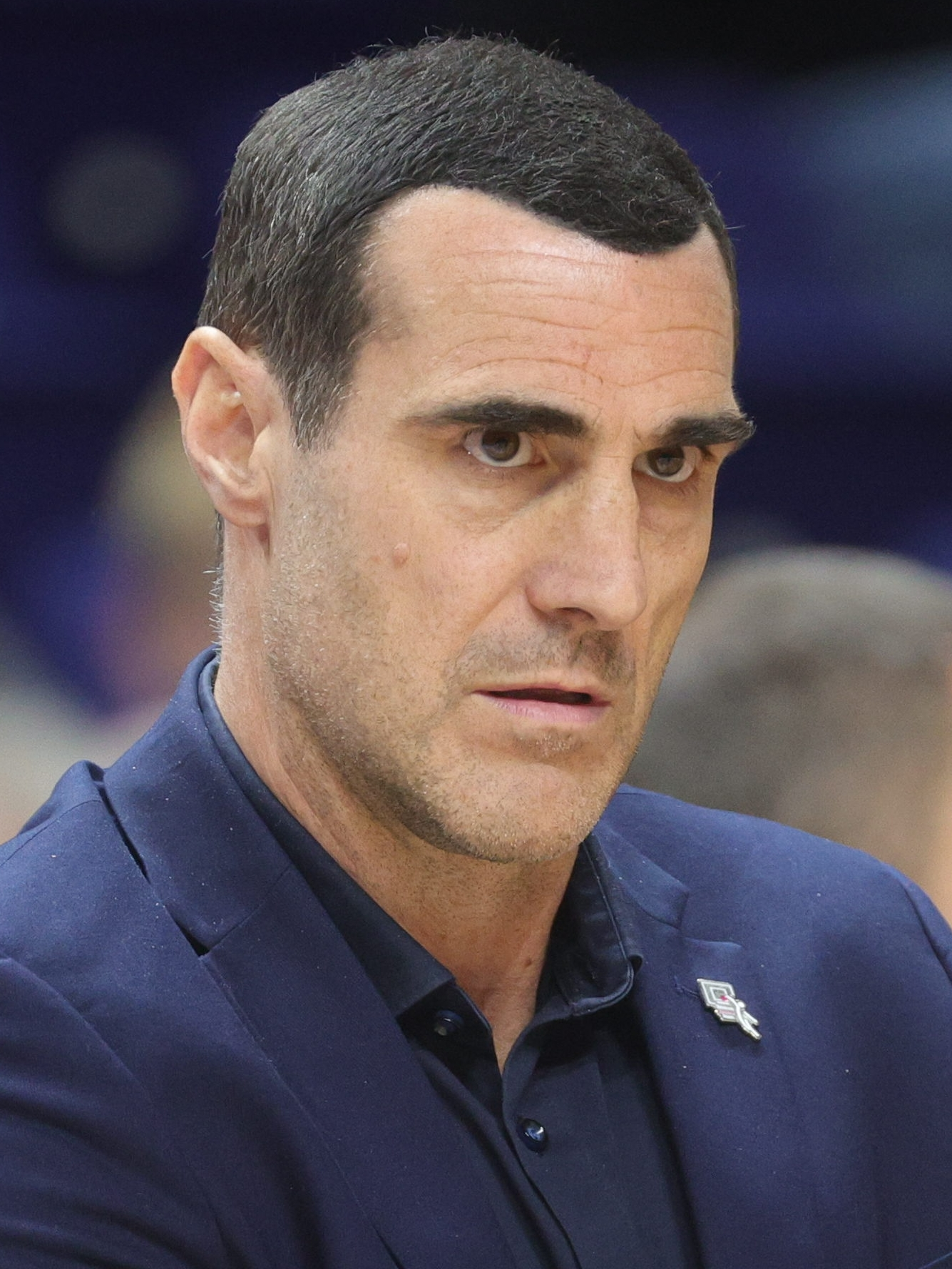

Antwerp Giants
- Title: Head coach
- League: BNXT League

Personal information
- Born: 16 December 1978 (age 47) Herentals, Belgium
- Listed height: 6 ft 3 in (1.91 m)
- Listed weight: 209 lb (95 kg)

Career information
- Playing career: 1996–2015
- Position: Point guard
- Number: 4
- Coaching career: 2015–present

Career history

Playing
- 1996–1997: Nieuw Brabo Antwerp
- 1997–1998: Bree
- 1999: Cuva Houthalen
- 1999–2000: Atomics Brussels
- 2000–2002: Racing Antwerp
- 2002–2006: Spirou Charleroi
- 2006–2007: ASVEL
- 2007: Leuven Bears
- 2007–2008: Spirou Charleroi
- 2008–2009: Gent Hawks
- 2009–2015: Antwerp Giants

Coaching
- 2015: Antwerp Giants (assistant)
- 2015–2019: Antwerp Giants
- 2018–present: Belgium U20
- 2019–2020: Brose Bamberg
- 2020–2023: BG Göttingen
- 2023–2025: Telekom Baskets Bonn
- 2025–present: Antwerp Giants

Career highlights
- As player: No. 4 retired by Antwerp Giants; 3× Belgian League champion (2003–2004, 2008); Belgian Cup winner (2003); 4× Belgian Player of the Year (2003–2004, 2011, 2013); As head coach: Belgian Supercup winner (2016); 2x Belgian League Coach of the Year (2016, 2019); Basketball Champions League Best Coach (2019); Belgian Cup champion (2026); Belgian League champion (2025–26)

Roel Moors (born 16 December 1978) is a Belgian retired professional basketball player and current head coach of Antwerp Giants of the BNXT League.

== Playing career ==
Moors usually played at the point guard position. He was also a member of the Belgian national basketball team, whom he played with at the European championships of 2011 and 2013. He played more than 100 matches for the Belgian national team.

On 8 October 2015 Moors' jersey number 4 was retired by Antwerp Giants.

== Coaching career ==
=== Antwerp Giants ===
Starting from the 2015–16 season, Moors was an assistant coach with Antwerp Giants. In November 2015, after Paul Vervaeck was fired, he was promoted to head coach. In September 2016, Moors won his first trophy as coach when his team won the Belgian Supercup over Oostende.

In the 2018–19 campaign, Moors unexpectedly led Antwerp to the third place in the Basketball Champions League. He was also awarded with the title Basketball Champions League Best Coach. He won the Coach of the Year of the domestic PBL again in May 2019. In June 2019, it was announced that Moors would leave the club.

=== Bamberg ===
On 20 June 2019, Brose Bamberg of the German Basketball Bundesliga (BBL) announced that Moors had signed a two-year contract.

=== Göttingen ===
On 13 July 2020 he signed with BG Göttingen of the Basketball Bundesliga.

=== Bonn ===
In June 2023, he signed as head coach of the Telekom Baskets Bonn, the Basketball Champions League winner of the previous season.

=== Antwerp Giants ===
In February 2025, he signed as head coach of the Antwerp Giants, returning to his former club.
