= 2009–10 Basketball League Belgium Division I =

Basketball League Belgium Division I
- Season: 2009–10
- Teams: 9

Regular season
- Season MVP: (United States) Will Thomas

Finals
- Champions: Spirou Charleroi (9th title)
- Runners-up: Liège Basket

Statistical leaders
Points	(United States) Brian Greene	16.8
Rebounds	(United States) Will Thomas	9.1
Assists	(United States) Stanley Burrell	4.6

The 2009–10 Basketball League Belgium Division I, for sponsorship reasons named 2009–10 Ethias League, was the 82nd season of the Basketball League Belgium, the highest professional basketball league in Belgium. Spirou Charleroi won the national title, their third straight and ninth total title.

== Regular season ==
Pos	Team	Pld	W	L	PF	PA	PD	Qualification or relegation
1	Liège Basket	32	23	9				Semifinals
2	Spirou Charleroi	32	21	11				Semifinals
3	Base Oostende	32	20	12				Quarterfinals
4	Okapi Aalstar	32	16	16				Quarterfinals
5	Antwerp Giants	32	15	17				Quarterfinals
6	Dexia Mons-Hainaut	32	15	17				Quarterfinals
7	VOO Verviers-Pepinster	32	15	17				
8	Optima Gent	32	10	22				
9	Leuven Bears	32	9	23				

== Playoffs ==
Quarterfinals
4	Okapi Aalstar	0
5	Antwerp Giants	2
3	Base Oostende	2
6	Dexia Mons-Hainaut	0

Semifinals
1	Liège Basket	2
5	Antwerp Giants	1
2	Spirou Charleroi	2
3	Base Oostende	0

Final
1	Liège Basket	1
2	Spirou Charleroi	3
