= Lier B.B.C. =

Lier Basketball Club was a professional basketball club based in the municipality of Lier, Belgium.

== Honours and titles ==
Belgian League

- Champions (2): 1970–71, 1971–72

Belgian Cup

- Winners (1): 1974–75
- Runners-up (5): 1969–70, 1971–72, 1972–73, 1973–74, 1975–76
