= 2011–12 Basketball League Belgium Division I =

Basketball League Belgium Division I
- Season: 2011–12
- Duration: 4 October 2011 – May 2012
- Games played: 32
- Teams: 9

Regular season
- Top seed: Telenet Oostende
- Season MVP: (United States) Chris Copeland

Finals
- Champions: Telenet Oostende (13th title)
- Runners-up: Belgacom Spirou Charleroi
- Semi-finalists: Port of Antwerp Giants; Belfius Mons-Hainaut

Statistical leaders
Points	(United States) Chris Copeland	21.5
Rebounds	(United States) Jason Love	8.7
Assists	(United States) Dominic Waters	4.1

The 2011–12 Basketball League Belgium Division I, for sponsorships reasons named 2011–12 Ethias League, was the 84th season of the Ethias League, the top tier basketball in Belgium. The season started on October 4, 2011, and finished in May 2012. Telenet BC Oostende took the title after beating Belgacom Spirou in five games.

== Teams ==
- Belgacom Liège Basket
- Belgacom Spirou Basket
- Dexia Mons-Hainaut
- Generali Okapi Aalstar
- Optima Gent
- Port of Antwerp Giants
- Stella Artois Leuven Bears
- Telenet BC Oostende
- VOO Verviers-Pepinster
Ethias League 2011–12 – Club Locations

== Regular season ==
Pos	Team	Pld	W	L	PF	PA	Qualification
1	Telenet Oostende	32	23	9	2467	2275	Qualified for the semifinals
2	Port of Antwerp Giants	32	23	9	2291	2052	Qualified for the semifinals
3	Belgacom Spirou	32	23	9	2478	2218	Qualified for the Playoffs
4	Generali Okapi Aalstar	32	18	14	2599	2462	Qualified for the Playoffs
5	Belfius Mons-Hainaut	32	15	17	2388	2412	Qualified for the Playoffs
6	Leuven Bears	32	14	18	2414	2441	Qualified for the Playoffs
7	Optima Gent	32	12	20	2161	2222	–
8	Belgacom Liège	32	11	21	2266	2468	–
9	VOO Verviers-Pepinster	32	5	27	2177	2641	–

== Playoffs ==
Quarterfinals
4	Generali Okapi Aalstar	0
5	Belfius Mons-Hainaut	2
3	Belgacom Spirou Basket	2
6	Leuven Bears	1

Semifinals
1	Telindus BC Oostende	2
5	Belfius Mons-Hainaut	0
2	Port of Antwerp Giants	0
3	Belgacom Spirou Basket	2

Final
1	Telindus BC Oostende	3
3	Belgacom Spirou Basket	2

== Awards ==
Most Valuable Player

- (United States) Christopher Copeland (Okapi Aalstar)

Coach of the Year

- (United States) Bradley Dean (Generali Okapi Aalstar)

Most Promising Player

- (Belgium) Jean-Marc Mwema (Antwerp Giants)

Star of the Coaches

- (United States) Christopher Copeland (Generali Okapi Aalstar)

Belgian Player of the Year

- (Belgium) Jorn Steinbach (Generali Okapi Aalstar)
