= Fresh Air Basketball =

Fresh Air Basketball is a professional basketball club based in Brussels, Belgium It was founded in 1926.

== History ==
Fresh Air is the basketball section of the Fresh Air Tennis Club. The club became a considerable force in the post-war Belgian basketball at the late '70s winning the Belgian league two consecutive times in a row (1978, 1979). In the 1978–79 season Fresh Air begun to play also in the Belgian Cup final but it lost the game to Sunair Oostende (66–77).

== Honours and titles ==
Belgian League

- Champions (4): 1936–37, 1937–38, 1977–78, 1978–79

Belgian Cup

- Runners-up (1): 1978–79

Belgian Supercup

- Winners (1): 1979
- Second division (1):
- Champions: 1975-76
