= 2012–13 Basketball League Belgium Division I =

Basketball League Belgium Division I
- Duration: 6 October 2012 – 9 June 2013
- Games played: 28
- Teams: 8

Regular season
- Top seed: Telenet Oostende
- Season MVP: (United States) Matt Lojeski

Finals
- Champions: Telenet Oostende; 14th title
- Runners-up: Belfius Mons-Hainaut
- Semifinalists: Spirou Charleroi; Okapi Aalstar

Awards
- Player of the Year: (Belgium) Roel Moors
- Rookie of the Year: (Belgium) Jean Salumu

Statistical leaders
Points	(United States) Matt Walsh	18.9
Rebounds	(United States) Matt Walsh	9.7
Assists	(United States) Jerime Anderson	5.3

The 2012–13 Basketball League Belgium Division I, for sponsorship reasons named 2012–13 Ethias League, was the 85th season of the top tier basketball league in Belgium. The season started on October 6, 2012 and finished on June 9, 2013. The season ended with the defending champions Telenet Oostende defeating Belfius Mons-Hainaut in three games to win its 14th national title.

== Participants ==
- Belgacom Liège Basket
- Belgacom Spirou Basket
- Belfius Mons-Hainaut
- Generali Okapi Aalstar
- Port of Antwerp Giants
- Spotter Leuven Bears
- Telenet BC Oostende
- VOO Verviers-Pepinster
Ethias League 2012–13 – Club Locations

== Regular season ==
Pos	Team	Pld	W	L	PF	PA	Qualification
1	Telenet Oostende	28	20	8	2227	2008	Qualified for the semifinals
2	Belgacom Spirou	28	19	9	2208	2074	Qualified for the semifinals
3	Belfius Mons-Hainaut	28	18	10	2178	2008	Qualified for the quarterfinals
4	Generali Okapi Aalstar	28	17	11	2341	2229	Qualified for the quarterfinals
5	Port of Antwerp Giants	28	17	11	2118	1996	Qualified for the quarterfinals
6	Spotter Leuven	28	9	19	2116	2330	Qualified for the quarterfinals
7	Belgacom Liège	28	8	20	2086	2226	
8	VVO Verviers-Pepinster	28	4	24	1989	2422	

== Playoffs ==
Quarterfinals
4	Okapi Aalstar	2
5	Antwerp Giants	0
3	Belfius Mons-Hainaut	2
6	Leuven Bears	0

Semifinals
1	BC Oostende	3
4	Okapi Aalstar	1
2	Spirou Charleroi	0
3	Belfius Mons-Hainaut	3

Final
1	BC Oostende	3
3	Belfius Mons-Hainaut	0

== Awards ==
=== Most Valuable Player ===
- (United States) Matt Lojeski (Telenet Oostende)

=== Rookie of the Year ===
- (Belgium) Jean Salumu (Telenet Oostende)

=== Belgian Player of the Year ===
- (Belgium) Roel Moors (Port of Antwerp Giants)
