= Country Hall Liège =

Arena in Liège, Belgium

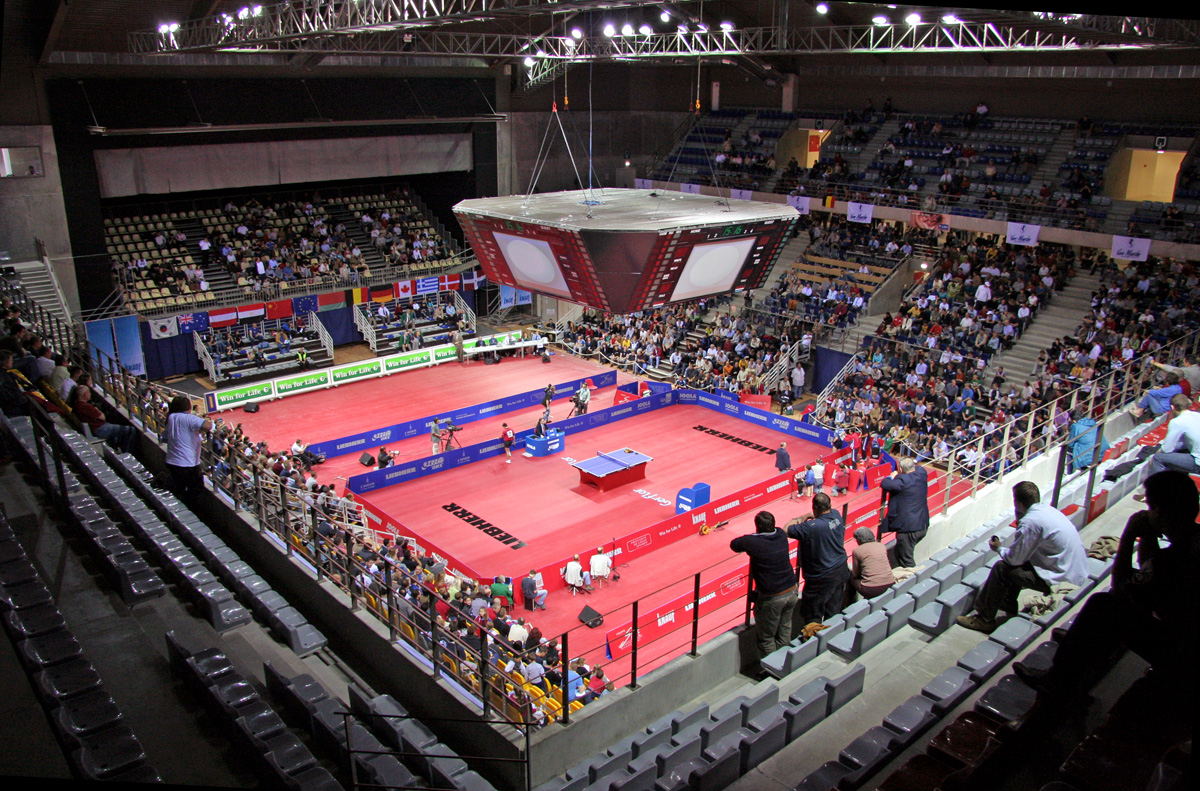
- Interactive map of Country Hall Liège
- Former names: Country Hall du Sart Tilman
- Location: Liège, Belgium
- Coordinates: 50°34′38.07″N 5°33′03.19″E
- Capacity: 5,600 (sport); 7,200 (concerts)

Construction
- Opened: 1972
- Renovated: 2005

Country Hall Liège (formerly Country Hall du Sart Tilman) is a multi-purpose arena in Liège, Belgium. The arena has 5,600 seats in its sport configuration and 7,200 in the concert configuration. It hosts indoor sporting events as well as concerts.

== Events ==
Notable sporting events hosted by the arena include the 1973 European champions cup final in which Ignis Varese defeated CSKA Moscow 71–66, and the 1977 European basketball championship. The arena is the regular home venue of Belgacom Liège Basket who competes in the Basketball League Belgium.

== See also ==
- List of indoor arenas in Belgium

Preceded by The Sports Palace at Yad Eliyahu; Tel Aviv	FIBA European Champions Cup; Final Venue; 1973	Succeeded by Palais des Sports de Beaulieu; Nantes
Preceded by Pionir Hall; Belgrade	EuroBasket; Final Venue; 1977	Succeeded by PalaRuffini; Turin
