= COREtec Dôme =

Indoor arena in Ostend, Belgium

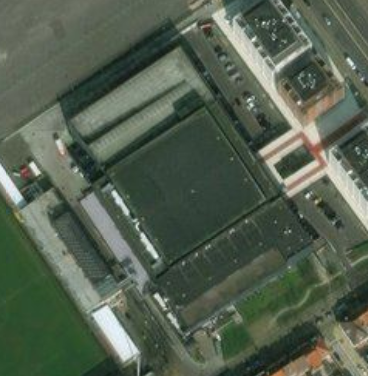
- Interactive map of COREtec Dôme
- Former names: Sea'Arena (2006); Sleuyter Arena (2006–2016), Versluys Dôme (2016–2022)
- Location: Ostend, Belgium
- Coordinates: 51.217812°N 2.888503°E
- Capacity: 5,000

Construction
- Opened: 2006

Tenant
- BC Oostende (2006–present)

COREtec Dôme, is a multi-purpose indoor arena that is located in Ostend, Belgium. COREtec Dôme has a seating capacity of 5,000 people for basketball games.

== History ==
COREtec Dôme opened in 2006. It has been used as the home arena of the Belgian League club BC Oostende. It has also been used to host Fed Cup and Davis Cup tennis matches. The original name was Sea'Arena. In 2006 the name was changed to Sleuyter Arena In 2016 the name was changed to Versluys Dôme In 2022, the name changed once again to COREtec Dôme.
