= Pro Basketball League =

- Formerly: See sponsorship names
- Founded: 1928
- Folded: 2021
- Replaced by: BNXT League
- Country: Belgium
- Federation: BLB
- Confederation: FIBA Europe
- Number of teams: 10
- Level on pyramid: 1
- Domestic cup: Belgian Cup
- Supercup: Belgian Supercup
- International cup(s): Champions League; Europe Cup
- Last champions: Filou Oostende (26th title) (2024–25)
- Most championships: Filou Oostende (26 titles)
- All-time top scorer: Willy Steveniers (11,870)
- President: Maarten Bostyn
- Website: euromillionsbasketball.be

The Pro Basketball League (PBL) was the highest tier level professional basketball league in Belgium for clubs. In 2021, the league was succeeded by the Belgian-Dutch BNXT League. The yearly Belgian playoffs as part of the BNXT League concludes with a Belgian League champion.

The league is organized by the Basketball League Belgium. The current president of the league is Maarten Bostyn.

The most successful team in the league is Oostende, which holds the record for the most league titles won, with 26, and the now defunct team of Racing Mechelen is second, with 15.

== History ==
On 15 March 2020, as a result of the COVID-19 pandemic the season was prematurely cancelled. Based on the standings in the regular season, Filou Oostende was crowned national champions.

== Sponsorship names ==
- Until 2014: Ethias League
- 2014–2016: Scooore! League
- 2016–2021 EuroMillions Basketball League
Ethias League logo

Scooore! League logo (2014–2016)

== Format and rules ==
The BLB is played by the international FIBA rules. Since 2014–15 the BLB season has a new format. In the regular season, all teams play each other first home and away. After that first round the league is divided in two groups based on standings; in the first group teams ranked 1–6 play and in the second 7–11. After the split each team plays all others in its group once home and once away. After that the Playoffs are played by eight teams. The quarterfinals consist of best-of-three series and the semi- and finals are played in a best-of-five format.

== Licensing ==
Teams that play in the BLB all have to get a license to play in the league. There are three types of licenses:

- A-license: for teams who have more than a € 1 million budget. A-licensed team can qualify for European competitions.
- B-license: teams with at least a €750,000 budget. B-licensed teams can't qualify for European play.
- C-licence: given to teams that are on the rise, with a budget of at least €400,000. C-licenses do not allow teams to qualify for European play and have to get replaced by B-licenses after two years.

== Current clubs ==
Location of the 2020–21 Pro Basketball League teams

| Club | City | Arena | Capacity |
|---|---|---|---|
| Antwerp Giants | Antwerp | Lotto Arena | 5,218 |
| Belfius Mons-Hainaut | Mons | Mons Arena | 4,000 |
| Filou Oostende | Ostend | Sleuyter Arena | 5,000 |
| Kangoeroes Mechelen | Mechelen | De Winketaai | 1,000 |
| Leuven Bears | Leuven | Sportoase | 3,400 |
| Limburg United | Hasselt | Alverberg-sporthal | 1,730 |
| Okapi Aalst | Aalst | Okapi Forum | 2,800 |
| Phoenix Brussels | Brussels | Complexe sportif de Neder-Over-Hembeek | 1,200 |
| Spirou | Charleroi | Spiroudome | 6,200 |
| VOO Liège | Liège | Country Hall Ethias Liège | 5,000 |

== Finals ==
Since 2005, play-offs are played to decide which team is crowned the champion of each season. The finals series are played in a best-of-five format, with the team which had the higher seed in the regular season having home court advantage.

| Season | Champions | Score | Runners-up |
|---|---|---|---|
| 2004–05 | Bree | 3–1 | Spirou |
| 2005–06 | Oostende | 3–1 | Mons-Hainaut |
| 2006–07 | Oostende | 3–2 | Bree |
| 2007–08 | Spirou | 3–0 | Bree |
| 2008–09 | Spirou | 3–0 | Mons-Hainaut |
| 2009–10 | Spirou | 3–1 | Liège Basket |
| 2010–11 | Spirou | 3–0 | Okapi Aalstar |
| 2011–12 | Oostende | 3–2 | Spirou |
| 2012–13 | Oostende | 3–0 | Mons-Hainaut |
| 2013–14 | Oostende | 3–2 | Okapi Aalstar |
| 2014–15 | Oostende | 3–1 | Mons-Hainaut |
| 2015–16 | Oostende | 3–1 | Okapi Aalstar |
| 2016–17 | Oostende | 3–1 | Brussels |
| 2017–18 | Oostende | 3–0 | Antwerp Giants |
| 2018–19 | Oostende | 3–1 | Antwerp Giants |
| 2019–20 | Oostende | Cancelled | Mons-Hainaut |
| 2020–21 | Oostende | 3–1 | Mons-Hainaut |
| 2021–22 | Oostende | 3–1 | Kangoeroes Mechelen |
| 2022–23 | Oostende | 3–1 | Antwerp Giants |
| 2023–24 | Oostende | 3–1 | Antwerp Giants |
| 2024–25 | Oostende | 3–1 | Kangoeroes Mechelen |
| 2025–26 | Antwerp Giants | 3–2 | Oostende |

=== Performances by club (2005–present) ===
| Team | Champions | Runners-up | Years champions | Years runners-up |
|---|---|---|---|---|
| Oostende | 16 | 1 | 2006, 2007, 2012, 2013, 2014, 2015, 2016, 2017, 2018, 2019, 2020, 2021, 2022, 2023, 2024, 2025 | 2026 |
| Spirou | 4 | 2 | 2008, 2009, 2010, 2011 | 2005, 2012 |
| Antwerp Giants | 1 | 4 | 2026 | 2018, 2019, 2023, 2024 |
| Bree | 1 | 2 | 2005 | 2007, 2008 |
| Mons-Hainaut | – | 6 | – | 2006, 2009, 2013, 2015, 2020, 2021 |
| Okapi Aalstar | – | 3 | – | 2011, 2014, 2016 |
| Kangoeroes Mechelen | – | 2 | – | 2022, 2025 |
| Liège | – | 1 | – | 2010 |
| Brussels | – | 1 | – | 2017 |

== Title holders ==
- 1927–28 Brussels A.C.
- 1928–29 Daring B.C.
- 1929–30 Brussels A.C.
- 1930–31 Brussels A.C.
- 1931–32 Daring B.C.
- 1932–33 Brussels A.C.
- 1933–34 Daring B.C.
- 1934–35 Amicale Sportive
- 1935–36 Amicale Sportive
- 1936–37 Fresh Air
- 1937–38 Fresh Air
- 1938–39 Royal IV
- 1939–41 Not held due to WWII
- 1941–42 Royal IV
- 1942–45 Not held due to WWII
- 1945–46 Semailles
- 1946–47 Semailles
- 1947–48 Semailles
- 1948–49 Semailles
- 1949–50 Semailles
- 1950–51 Semailles
- 1951–52 Royal IV
- 1953–53 Royal IV
- 1953–54 Royal IV
- 1954–55 Hellas Gent
- 1955–56 Antwerpse
- 1956–57 Royal IV
- 1957–58 Royal IV
- 1958–59 Antwerpse
- 1959–60 Antwerpse
- 1960–61 Antwerpse
- 1961–62 Antwerpse
- 1962–63 Antwerpse
- 1963–64 Antwerpse
- 1964–65 Racing Mechelen
- 1965–66 Racing Mechelen
- 1966–67 Racing Mechelen
- 1967–68 Standard Liège
- 1968–69 Racing Bell Mechelen
- 1969–70 Standard Liège
- 1970–71 Bus Fruit Lier
- 1971–72 Bus Fruit Lier
- 1972–73 Racing Antwerpen
- 1973–74 Maes Pils
- 1974–75 Maes Pils
- 1975–76 Maes Pils
- 1976–77 Standard Liège
- 1977–78 Fresh Air
- 1978–79 Fresh Air
- 1979–80 Maes Pils
- 1980–81 Sunair Oostende
- 1981–82 Sunair Oostende
- 1982–83 Sunair Oostende
- 1983–84 Sunair Oostende
- 1984–85 Sunair Oostende
- 1985–86 Sunair Oostende
- 1986–87 Maes Pils
- 1987–88 Sunair Oostende
- 1988–89 Maes Pils
- 1989–90 Maes Pils
- 1990–91 Maes Pils
- 1991–92 Maes Pils
- 1992–93 Maes Pils
- 1993–94 Maes Pils
- 1994–95 Sunair Oostende
- 1995–96 Spirou
- 1996–97 Spirou
- 1997–98 Spirou
- 1998–99 Spirou
- 1999–00 Telindus Racing Antwerpen
- 2000–01 Telindus Oostende
- 2001–02 Telindus Oostende
- 2002–03 Spirou
- 2003–04 Spirou
- 2004–05 Euphony Bree
- 2005–06 Telindus Oostende
- 2006–07 Telindus Oostende
- 2007–08 Spirou
- 2008–09 Spirou
- 2009–10 Spirou
- 2010–11 Spirou
- 2011–12 Telenet Oostende
- 2012–13 Telenet Oostende
- 2013–14 Telenet Oostende
- 2014–15 Telenet Oostende
- 2015–16 Telenet Oostende
- 2016–17 Telenet Oostende
- 2017–18 Telenet Oostende
- 2018–19 Filou Oostende
- 2019–20 Filou Oostende
- 2020–21 Filou Oostende
- 2021–22 Filou Oostende
- 2022–23 Filou Oostende
- 2023–24 Filou Oostende
- 2024–25 Filou Oostende
- 2025–26 Antwerp Giants

== Performance by club ==
Key
| + | Denotes a team that has been dissolved. |

| Titles | Team | Seasons |
|---|---|---|
| 26 | Oostende | 1981, 1982, 1983, 1984, 1985, 1986, 1988, 1995, 2001, 2002, 2006, 2007, 2012, 2013, 2014, 2015, 2016, 2017, 2018, 2019, 2020, 2021, 2022, 2023, 2024, 2025 |
| 15 | Racing Mechelen^{+} | 1965, 1966, 1967, 1969, 1974, 1975, 1976, 1980, 1987, 1989, 1990, 1991, 1992, 1993, 1994 |
| 10 | Spirou | 1996, 1997, 1998, 1999, 2003, 2004, 2008, 2009, 2010, 2011 |
| 8 | Antwerpse^{+} | 1956, 1959, 1960, 1961, 1962, 1963, 1964, 1973 |
| 7 | Royal IV^{+} | 1939, 1942, 1952, 1953, 1954, 1957, 1958 |
| 6 | Semailles^{+} | 1946, 1947, 1948, 1949, 1950, 1951 |
| 4 | Fresh Air | 1937, 1938, 1978, 1979 |
| 4 | Brussels A.C.^{+} | 1928, 1930, 1931, 1933 |
| 3 | Daring B.C.^{+} | 1929, 1932, 1934 |
| 3 | Standard Liège^{+} | 1968, 1970, 1977 |
| 2 | Antwerp Giants | 2000, 2026 |
| 2 | Lier^{+} | 1971, 1972 |
| 2 | Amicale Sportive^{+} | 1935, 1936 |
| 1 | Bree^{+} | 2005 |
| 1 | Hellas Gent^{+} | 1955 |

== Individual awards ==
Not all awards are official ones handed out by the league itself, but all are regarded and respected as BLB awards. As example the Belgian Player of the Year award is handed out by the Belgian newspaper Het Nieuwsblad, but the league itself reports the winner on its website.

- Belgian Basketball Player of the year
- Coach of the Year
- MVP
- Star of the Coaches
- Young Player of the Year
- Lifetime Achievement Award

== See also ==
- Belgian Basketball All-Star Game

== Sources ==
- List of Champions
