= List of Pro Basketball League season scoring leaders =

In basketball, points are the sum of the score accumulated through free throws or field goals. The Pro Basketball League (PBL) scoring title is awarded to the player with the highest points per game average in a given season.

== Leaders ==
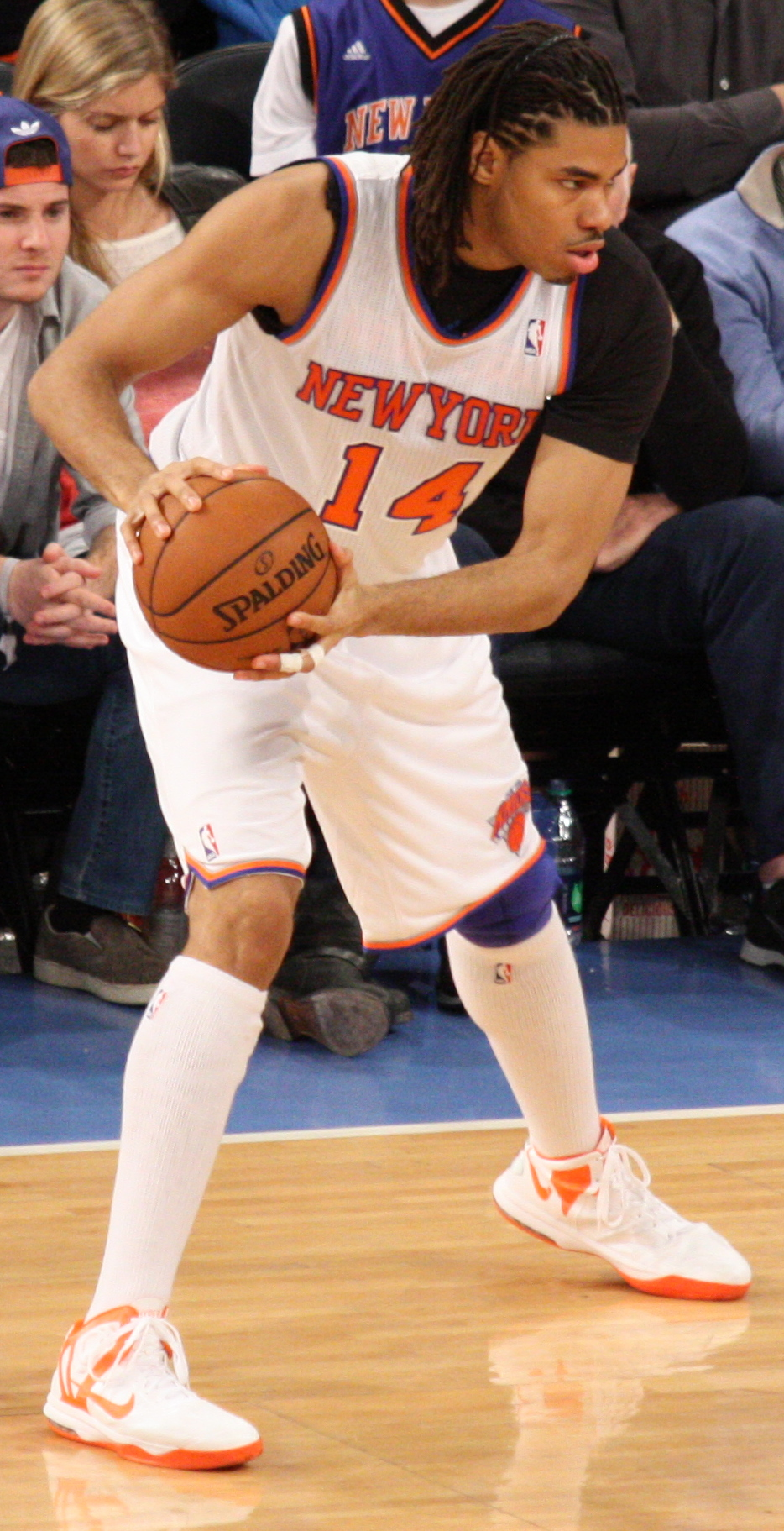
Chris Copeland was scoring champion in 2012

Season	Player	Pos.	Nationality	Team	PPG	Ref
1997–98	Daren Queenan	SG	United States	BBC Aalst	29.4	
1998–99	Daren Queenan (2)	SG	United States	BBC Aalst	24.9	
1999–00	Mike Doyle	G/F	United States	Okapi Aalst	22.7	
2000–01	Greg Harris	G/F	United States	Power Wevelgem	21.4	
2001–02	Alton Mason Sr.	PG	United States	Tournai Estaimpuis	21.0	
2002–03	Darius Lane	SG	United States	Tournai Estaimpuis	19.7	
2003–04	Mekeli Wesley	F	Fiji	Eurolines Vilvoorde	19.9	
2004–05	Kevin Houston	G/F	United States	Leuven Bears	22.3	
2005–06	Julius Jenkins	SG	United States	Bree	19.5	
2006–07	Michael Campbell	F	United States	Atomia Brussels	17.6	
2007–08	Andre Emmett	SG	United States	Belgacom Liège	23.9	
2008–09	Matt Lojeski	G	Belgium	Okapi Aalstar	18.3	
2009–10	Brian Greene	PF	United States	Okapi Aalstar	16.8	
2010–11	Stefon Jackson	G	United States	Verviers-Pepinster	16.3	
2011–12	Chris Copeland	PF	United States	Okapi Aalstar	21.5	
2012–13	Matt Walsh	F	United States	Spirou Charleroi	18.9	
2013–14	Derek Raivio	G	United States	Okapi Aalstar	18.7	
2014–15	Arizona Reid	SF	United States	VOO Wolves Verviers-Pepinster	19.9	
2015–16	Miloš Bojović	G	United States	Leuven Bears	17.2	
2016–17	Codi Miller-McIntyre	G	United States	Leuven Bears	17.2	
2017–18	Miloš Bojović	G	Serbia	Liège Basket	18.6	
2018–19	Miloš Bojović (2)	G	Serbia	Liège Basket	19.0	
2019–20	Hugh Robertson	G	United States	Leuven Bears	19.4	
2020–21	Vladimir Mihailović	G	Montenegro	Okapi Aalst	19.3	
