= List of Pro Basketball League season assists leaders =

In basketball, an assist is a pass to a teammate that directly leads to a score by field goal. The Basketball League Belgium Division I's assist title is awarded to the player with the highest assists per game average in a given regular season.

== Leaders ==
Season	Player	Position (Note: The player's primary position is listed.)	Nationality	Team	APG	Ref
2003–04	Jean-Marc Jaumin	G	Belgium	Mons-Hainaut	5.9	
2004–05	Dror Hajaj	G	Israel	Passe-Partout Leuven	5.4	
2005–06	Omar Cook	G	United States	Mons-Hainaut	7.2	
2006–07	Trevor Huffman (2×)	G	United States	Okapi Aalstar	5.3	
2007–08	Doron Perkins	G	United States	Bree B.B.C.	5.8	
2008–09	Trevor Huffman	G	United States	Okapi Aalstar	5.0	
2009–10	Stanley Burrell	G	United States	Verviers-Pepinster	4.6	
2010–11	Darrel Mitchell	G	United States	Telenet Oostende	4.1	
2011–12	Dominic Waters	G	United States	Liège Basket	4.1	
2012–13	Jerime Anderson	G	United States	Verviers-Pepinster	5.3	
2013–14	Domien Loubry	G	Belgium	Basic-Fit Brussels	4.8	
2014–15	Dušan Đorđević	G	Serbia	Telenet Oostende	5.4	
2015–16	Niels Marnegrave	G	Belgium	Telenet Oostende	5.8	
2016–17	Codi Miller-McIntyre	G	United States	Leuven Bears	5.8	
2017–18	Joe Rahon	G	United States	Limburg United	5.6	
2018–19	Paris Lee	G	United States	Antwerp Giants	5.4	
