= Pro Basketball League Star of the Coaches =

The Pro Basketball League (PBL) Star of the Coaches (Ster van de Coaches in Dutch) was an annual Pro Basketball League award given to the player who got the most votes for being the league's best player from coaches in the league. The award was discontinued in 2018, when it was decided that coaches' votes would contribute to elect the season MVP, and no longer used for a separate award.

== Winners ==
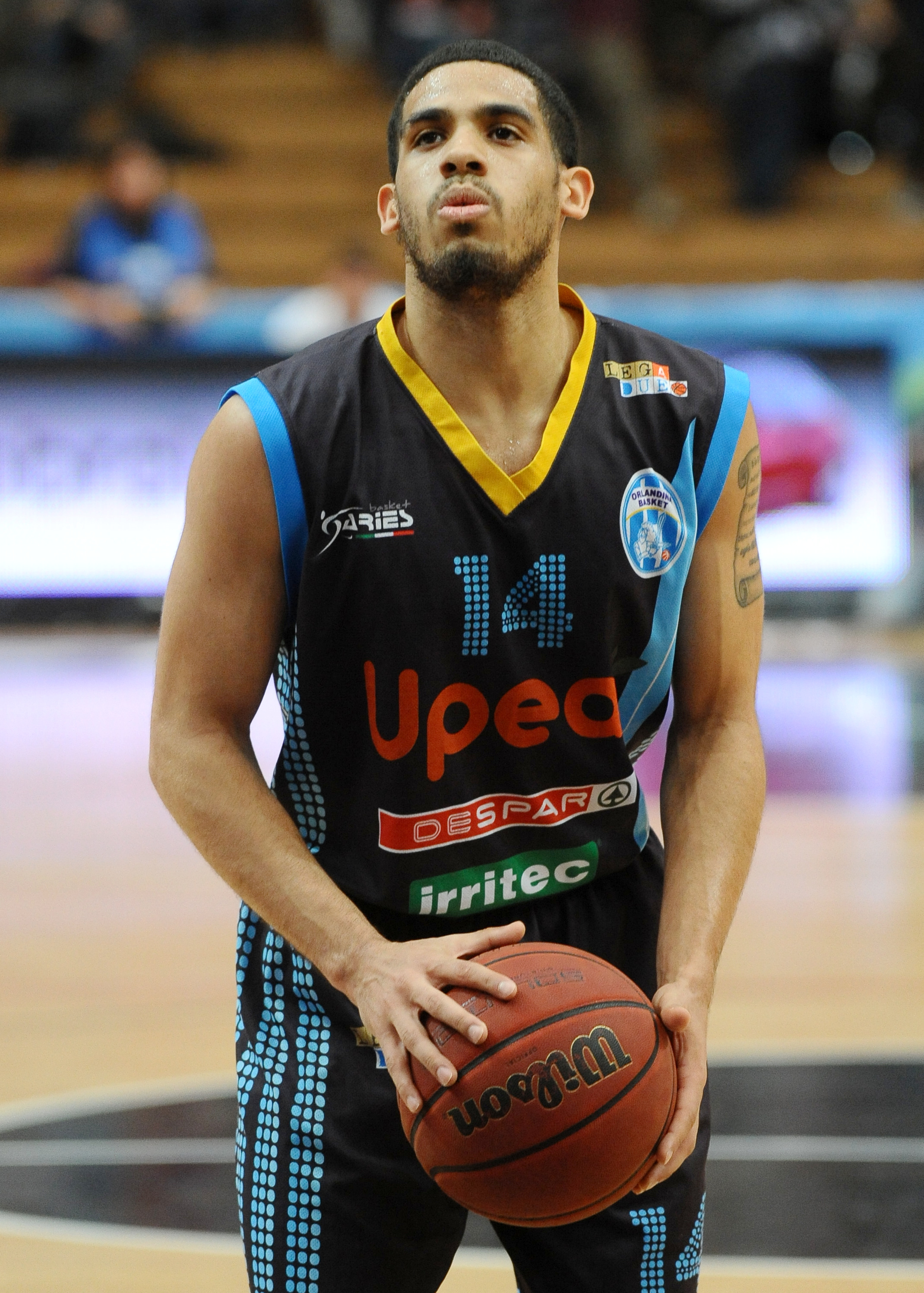
Talor Battle won the award in 2014

Season	Player	Position (Note: The player's primary position is listed.)	Nationality	Team	Ref(s)
2008–09 (Note: Denotes seasons in which joint winners were named.)	Trevor Huffman	PG	United States	Okapi Aalstar	
2008–09	Timothy Black	PG	United States	Antwerp Diamond Giants	
2009–10	Will Thomas	PF	United States (Note: Will Thomas owns the Georgian nationality as well.)	Belgacom Liège Basket	
2010–11	Christopher Young	C	United States (Note: Christopher Young owns the Lithuanian and Belgian nationality as well.)	Okapi Aalstar	
2011–12	Christopher Copeland	F	United States	Okapi Aalstar	
2012–13	Derek Raivio	SG	United States	Okapi Aalstar	
2013–14	Talor Battle	PG	United States	Belfius Mons-Hainaut	
2014–15	Dušan Đorđević	PG	Serbia	Telenet Oostende	
2015–16	John Tofi	C	Samoa	Okapi Aalstar	
2016–17	Seth Tuttle	G	United States	Spirou	
