= Niels Marnegrave =

Belgian basketball player (born 1987)

Limburg United
- Title: Assistant coach
- League: BNXT League

Personal information
- Born: 9 December 1987 (age 38) Liège, Belgium
- Listed height: 6 ft 3 in (1.91 m)
- Listed weight: 201 lb (91 kg)

Career information
- Playing career: 2004–present
- Position: Point guard

Career history

Playing
- 2004–2005: Liège
- 2005–2009: Mons-Hainaut
- 2009–2010: Verviers-Pepinster
- 2010–2013: Leuven Bears
- 2013–2016: Oostende
- 2016–2019: Spirou Charleroi
- 2019–2021: Limburg United

Coaching
- 2021–present: Limburg United (assistant)

Career highlights
- As player: PBL assists leader (2016); 3× PBL champion (2014–2016); 4× Belgian Cup champion (2006, 2014–2016)

Niels Marnegrave (born 9 December 1987) is a Belgian retired basketball player and current coach. He currently is an assistant coach for Limburg United of the BNXT League. In his playing career, he played as point guard.

== Career ==
Marnegrave debuted on the professional level in the 2004–05 season for Liège Basket.

After his debut season he signed with Dexia Mons-Hainaut. In 2006 he won the Belgian Cup with the team.

In the 2009–10 season Marnegrave played for RBC Verviers-Pepinster.

He signed a 3-year contract with the Leuven Bears in 2010. In the 2012–13 season, Marnegrave averaged 11.7 points per game and led the league in steals with 2.4 per game.

Marnegrave signed with defending Belgian champion Telenet BC Oostende for the 2013–14 season. He still played there in 2014-2015 and 2015–2016 season.

On 9 June 2016 Marnegrave signed with Spirou Charleroi.

== Coaching career ==
In September 2021, Marnegrave joined his last club Limburg United as assistant coach.

== Honors ==
- Belgian League (3): 2014, 2015, 2016
- Belgian Cup (4): 2006, 2014, 2015, 2016

Individual awards

- Belgian League assists leader (1): 2016
