= 2020–21 Pro Basketball League =

Basket-ball championship

Pro Basketball League
- Season: 2020–21
- Dates: 6 November 2020 – 14 May 2021
- Games played: 4
- Teams: 10

Regular season
- Season MVP: (Montenegro) Vladimir Mihailović (Okapi Aalst)

Finals
- Champions: Oostende (22nd title)
- Runners-up: Belfius Mons-Hainaut
- Finals MVP: (Belgium) Loïc Schwartz (Oostende)

Statistical leaders
Points	(Montenegro) Vladimir Mihailović (Okapi Aalst)	19.3
Rebounds	(United States) Trevor Thompson (Kangoeroes)	9.0
Assists	(United States) Jabril Durham (Mons-Hainaut)	6.3

The 2020–21 Pro Basketball League (PBL) was the 94th season of the Pro Basketball League, the highest professional basketball league in the Belgium. The regular season was supposed to start in September 2020 but was delayed to 2 October 2020 due to new coronavirus restrictions. It is the last season as the PBL, as in the following season the multinational BNXT League commences.

It will be the first season after the 2019–20 season was ended prematurely due to the COVID-19 pandemic.

BC Oostende won its 22nd national championship after beating Belfius Mons-Hainaut in the finals.

== Teams ==
=== Stadiums and locations ===
Location of the 2020–21 Pro Basketball League teams

Note: Table lists in alphabetical order.

Club	City	Arena	Capacity
Antwerp Giants	Antwerp	Lotto Arena	5,218
Kangoeroes Mechelen	Mechelen	Winketkaai	1,500
Leuven Bears	Leuven	Sportoase	3,400
Liège Basket	Liège	Country Hall	5,000
Limburg United	Hasselt	Alverberg Sporthal	1,730
Mons-Hainaut	Mons	Mons Arena	4,000
Okapi Aalst	Aalst	Okapi Forum	2,800
Oostende	Ostend	Sleuyter Arena	5,000
Phoenix Brussels	Brussels	Piscine de Neder-Over-Hembeek	1,200
Spirou	Charleroi	Spiroudome	6,200

=== Personnel and kits ===
Team	Head coach	Captain	Kit manufacturer	Main sponsor
Antwerp Giants	(Belgium) Christophe Beghin	(United States) Dave Dudzinski	Spalding	Telenet
Kangoeroes Mechelen	(Belgium) Paul Vervaeck		Spalding	PMC
Leuven Bears	(Belgium) Eddy Casteels	(United States) Joshua Heath	Errea	
Liège Basket	(Belgium) Lionel Bosco	(Serbia) Miloš Bojović	Spalding	
Limburg United	(Belgium) Sacha Massot	(Belgium) Wen Mukubu	K1x	Hubo Belgium
Mons-Hainaut	(Bosnia and Herzegovina) Vedran Bosnić	(United States) Justin Cage		Belfius
Okapi Aalst	(Belgium) Yves Defraigne	(Belgium) Senne Geukens	Spalding	CheckNet
Oostende	(Croatia) Dario Gjergja	(Serbia) Dušan Đorđević	Spalding	Filou
Phoenix Brussels	(Belgium) Ian Hanavan	(United States) BJ Raymond	Macron	None
Spirou	(Belgium) Sam Rotsaert	(Belgium) Alex Libert	Spalding	Bel RTL

=== Managerial changes ===
Team	Outgoing manager	Manner of departure	Date of vacancy	Position in table	Incoming manager	Date of appointment
Phoenix Brussels	(Belgium) Serge Crevecoeur	End of contract	March 2020	Pre-season	(Belgium) Ian Hanavan	13 March 2020
Limburg United	(United States) Brian Lynch	Resigned	March 2020	Pre-season	(Belgium) Sacha Massot	25 March 2020
Liège Basket	(Belgium) Sacha Massot	Signed with Limburg United	25 March 2020	Pre-season	(Belgium) Lionel Bosco	25 March 2020

== Regular season ==
=== League table ===
Pos	Team	Pld	W	L	PF	PA	PD	Pts	Qualification
1	Filou Oostende	26	21	5	2159	1786	+373	47	Qualification for playoffs
2	Belfius Mons-Hainaut	26	21	5	1941	1831	+110	47	Qualification for playoffs
3	Telenet Giants Antwerp	26	17	9	2185	2016	+169	43	Qualification for playoffs
4	Okapi Aalst	26	16	10	2161	1962	+199	42	Qualification for playoffs
5	Hubo Limburg United	26	14	12	2028	1949	+79	40	Qualification for playoffs
6	Stella Artois Leuven Bears	26	12	14	1968	2019	−51	38	Qualification for playoffs
7	Kangoeroes Mechelen	26	10	16	1957	2085	−128	36	Qualification for playoffs
8	Spirou Charleroi	26	9	17	1937	2114	−177	35	Qualification for playoffs
9	VOO Liège	26	6	20	1853	2151	−298	32	
10	Phoenix Brussels	26	4	22	1919	2235	−316	30	

Source: EuroMillions League

=== Results ===
Home \ Away	MON	OOS	LIM	MEC	BRU	SPI	LEU	ANT	OKA	LIE	MON	OOS	LIM	MEC	BRU	SPI	LEU	ANT	OKA	LIE
Belfius Mons-Hainaut	—	—	70–68	—	—	—	65–59	—			—									
Filou Oostende	—	—	—		89–70	94–79	—		—	—		—								
Hubo Limburg United		—	—	—	—	—		—					—							
Kangoeroes Mechelen	—		—	—			—		—	—				—						
Phoenix Brussels	—		—		—		—	86–91	—	—					—					
Spirou	—		—		86–80	—	—		—	—						—				
Stella Artois Leuven Bears		—		—	—	—	—	—									—			
Telenet Giants Antwerp	—		—			82–79	—	—	—	—								—		
Okapi Aalst									—										—	
VOO Liège		—		—	—	—		—		—										—

Updated to match(es) played on 6 December 2020. Source: EuroMillions Basketball League
Legend: Blue = home team win; Red = away team win.

== Playoffs ==
Quarterfinals
1 Filou Oostende	2
8 Spirou	0
4 Okapi Aalst	1
5 Limburg United	2
2 Belfius Mons-Hainaut	2
7 Kangoeroes Mechelen	1
3 Antwerp Giants	2
6 Leuven Bears	0

Semifinals
1 Filou Oostende	2
5 Limburg United	0
2 Belfius Mons-Hainaut	2
3 Antwerp Giants	1

Finals
1 Filou Oostende	3
2 Belfius Mons-Hainaut	1
