= List of Pro Basketball League season steals leaders =

The Basketball League Belgium Division I steals title is awarded to the player with the highest steals per game average in a given regular season of the Basketball League Belgium Division I.

== Leaders ==
Division I assists leaders
Season	Player	Team	APG
2007–08	(United States) Doron Perkins	Bree B.B.C.	3.1
2008–09	(United States) Bryan Hopkins	Antwerp Giants	2.4
2009–10	(United States) Loren Stokes	Okapi Aalstar	2.3
2010–11	(United States) Michael Jenkins	Liège	2.8
2011–12	(Nigeria) Ade Dagunduro	Leuven Bears	2.5
2012–13	(Belgium) Niels Marnegrave	Leuven Bears	2.6
2013–14	(United States) Tu Holloway	Leuven Bears	2.5
2014–15	(United States) Jesse Sanders	Limburg United	2.3
2015–16	(United States) Lucky Jones (United States) Andre Hollins	Liège Basket; Leuven Bears	1.9
2016–17	(United States) Wesley Channels	Kangoeroes Willebroek	1.5
2017–18	(Serbia) Miloš Bojović	Liège Basket	1.9
2018–19	(United States) Corey Allen Jr.	Leuven Bears	1.9
