= Len Matela =

American basketball player

Personal information
- Born: January 27, 1980 (age 46) Merrillville, Indiana
- Listed height: 6 ft 9 in (2.06 m)
- Listed weight: 246 lb (112 kg)

Career information
- High school: Andrean (Merrillville, Indiana)
- College: Bowling Green (1998–2002)
- NBA draft: 2002: undrafted
- Playing career: 2002–2012
- Position: Center

Career history
- 2002–2003: Mitteldeutscher BC
- 2003–2007: Antwerp Giants
- 2007–2010: Spirou Charleroi
- 2010–2012: Liege Basket

Career highlights
- Belgian League MVP (2007)

Len Matela (born January 27, 1980) is a retired American professional basketball player. He played the center position.

== Career ==
Matela played college basketball at Bowling Green State University. He went undrafted in the 2002 NBA draft.

He arrived in Europe in 2002 signing with Mitteldeutscher BC of Germany. He later played his whole career in Belgium with Antwerp Giants, Spirou Charleroi and Liege Basket.

While playing for Antwerp Giants, he was named MVP of the Belgian League in the 2006–07 season.
