= 2009–10 Euroleague Top 16 Group F =

Standings and Results for Group F of the Top 16 phase of the 2009–10 Euroleague basketball tournament.

== Standings ==
Key to colors
Top two places in each group advance to Quarterfinals
Eliminated

	Team	Pld	W	L	PF	PA	Diff	Tie-break
1.	(Israel) Maccabi Tel Aviv	6	4	2	444	423	+21	
2.	(Spain) Real Madrid	6	3	3	447	444	+3	1–1, +1
3.	(Italy) Montepaschi Siena	6	3	3	481	497	–16	1–1, –1
4.	(Turkey) Efes Pilsen Istanbul	6	2	4	437	445	–8	

== Fixtures and results ==
All times given below are in Central European Time.

Unless otherwise indicated, all attendance totals are from the corresponding match report posted on the official Euroleague site and included with each game summary.

=== Game 1 ===
27 January 2010
20:45

Report

Real Madrid (Spain)	77–70	(Turkey) Efes Pilsen Istanbul
Scoring by quarter: 13-19, 17-14, 26-20, 21-17
Pts: Bullock 12; Rebs: Reyes 5 Asts: Prigioni 5		Pts: Smith 18; Rebs: Smith 7 Asts: Thornton 6

Palacio Vistalegre
Attendance: 5,400
Referees: Guerrino Cerebuch (ITA), Ilija Belosevic (SRB), David Chambon (FRA)

28 January 2010
20:30

Report

Montepaschi Siena (Italy)	76–72	(Israel) Maccabi Tel Aviv
Scoring by quarter: 17-12, 16-14, 21-23, 22-23
Pts: Hawkins 17; Rebs: Stonerook 11; Asts: Hawkins 5		Pts: Anderson 26; Rebs: Bluthenthal 7 Asts: Perkins 4

Palasport Mens Sana
Attendance: 4,391
Referees: Juan Carlos Arteaga (ESP), Christos Christodoulou (GRE), Siniša Herceg (CRO)

=== Game 2 ===
3 February 2010
19:15

Report

Efes Pilsen Istanbul (Turkey)	88–78	(Italy) Montepaschi Siena
Scoring by quarter: 27-17, 18-17, 22-18, 21-26
Pts: Kasun 17; Rebs: Kasun 9 Asts: Smith, Rakočević 4		Pts: Sato 19; Rebs: Sato 10; Asts: Sato 3

Abdi İpekçi Arena
Attendance: 5,500
Referees: Romualdas Brazauskas (LTU), Sreten Radović (CRO), Sasa Maricic (SRB)

4 February 2010
20:00

Report

Maccabi Tel Aviv (Israel)	81–76	(Spain) Real Madrid
Scoring by quarter: 18-18, 23-16, 23-20, 17-22
Pts: Anderson 20; Rebs: Anderson 8 Asts: Perkins 8		Pts: Kaukėnas 17; Rebs: Veličković 8 Asts: Prigioni, Jarić 3

Nokia Arena
Attendance: 11,500
Referees: Carl Jungebrand (FIN), Sradan Dozai (CRO), Spiros Gkontas (GRE)

=== Game 3 ===
11 February 2010
20:00

Report

Maccabi Tel Aviv (Israel)	72–62	(Turkey) Efes Pilsen Istanbul
Scoring by quarter: 18-13, 18-20, 15-16, 21-13
Pts: Anderson 23; Rebs: Anderson 9 Asts: Perkins 5		Pts: Smith 15; Rebs: Shumpert 5 Asts: Tunçeri, Thornton 3

Nokia Arena
Attendance: 11,500
Referees: Dani Hierrezuelo (ESP), Dubravko Muhvic (CRO), Elias Koromila (GRE)

11 February 2010
20:30

Report

Montepaschi Siena (Italy)	83–76	(Spain) Real Madrid
Scoring by quarter: 26-16, 19-19, 19-24, 19-17
Pts: McIntyre 24; Rebs: Sato 7 Asts: McIntyre 11		Pts: Lavrinovič 24; Rebs: Veličković 7 Asts: Prigioni 5

Palasport Mens Sana
Attendance: 4,989
Referees: Shmuel Bachar (ISR), Leonidas Spiridonos (GRE), Milivoje Jovcic (SRB

=== Game 4 ===
24 February 2010
19:15

Report

Efes Pilsen Istanbul (Turkey)	63–56	(Israel) Maccabi Tel Aviv
Scoring by quarter: 21-14, 14-16, 12-14, 16-12
Pts: Kasun 14; Rebs: Kasun 13; Asts: Thornton 4		Pts: Bluthenthal 15; Rebs: Fischer 7 Asts: Perkins 4

Abdi İpekçi Arena
Attendance: 9,800
Referees: Zoran Sutulovic (MNE), Borys Ryzhyk (UKR), Panagiotis Anastopoulos (GRE)

25 February 2010
20:45

Report

Real Madrid (Spain)	77–69	(Italy) Montepaschi Siena
Scoring by quarter: 13-16, 19-21, 16-16, 29-16
Pts: Llull 17; Rebs: Tomić 9 Asts: Prigioni 6		Pts: Domercant, Sato 17; Rebs: Sato, Stonerook 8 Asts: McIntyre 7

Palacio Vistalegre
Attendance: 11,300
Referees: Grzegorz Ziemblicki (POL), Ilija Belosevic (SRB), Matej Boltauzer (SLO)

=== Game 5 ===
4 March 2010
19:00

Report

Maccabi Tel Aviv (Israel)	97–82	(Italy) Montepaschi Siena
Scoring by quarter: 19-21, 24-16, 11-20, 43-25
Pts: Anderson 24; Rebs: Perkins, Eidson 5 Asts: Eidson 4		Pts: Domercant 21; Rebs: Sato, Stonerook 5 Asts: Stonerook 5

Nokia Arena
Attendance: 11,500
Referees: Volodymr Drabikovsky (UKR), Jakub Zamojski (POL), Milija Vojinovic (SRB)

4 March 2010
19:15

Report

Efes Pilsen Istanbul (Turkey)	75–77	(Spain) Real Madrid
Scoring by quarter: 19-23, 10-21, 23-12, 23-21
Pts: Kasun, Smith 13; Rebs: Kasun 11; Asts: Thornton 2		Pts: Garbajosa 16; Rebs: Garbajosa 11; Asts: Prigioni 10

Abdi İpekçi Arena
Attendance: 11,500
Referees: Christos Christodoulou (GRE), Eddie Viator (FRA), Olegs Latisevs (LAT)

=== Game 6 ===
11 March 2010
20:45

Report

Montepaschi Siena (Italy)	93–87	(Turkey) Efes Pilsen Istanbul
Scoring by quarter: 26-18, 24-22, 23-28, 20-19
Pts: Sato, Hawkins 22; Rebs: Sato 5 Asts: McIntyre 4		Pts: Smith 15; Rebs: Kasun 9 Asts: Popović 4

Palasport Mens Sana
Attendance: 2,572
Referees: Juan Carlos Arteaga (ESP), Emilio Pérez Pizarro (ESP), Sreten Radović (CRO)

11 March 2010
20:45

Report

Real Madrid (Spain)	64–66	(Israel) Maccabi Tel Aviv
Scoring by quarter: 17-10, 14-11, 14-15, 19-30
Pts: Llull 14; Rebs: Reyes 8 Asts: Prigioni 3		Pts: Bluthenthal, Fischer 13; Rebs: Perkins, Fischer 8 Asts: Perkins 5

Palacio Vistalegre
Attendance: 13,900
Referees: Romualdas Brazauskas (LTU), Lazaros Voreadis (GRE), Saša Pukl (SLO)
