= Aleksandar Zečević =

Aleksandar Zečević may refer to:

- Aleksandar Zečević (basketball, born 1975), Serbian basketball coach and former player
- Aleksandar Zečević (basketball, born 1996), Serbian player
