= Serge Crèvecœur =

Belgian basketball coach (born 1971)

Brussels Basketball
- Position: Head coach
- League: BNXT League

Personal information
- Born: 1 October 1971 (age 55) Brussels, Belgium

Career history

Coaching
- –2003: Saint-Roch
- 2003-2005: Linthout
- 2005–2008: Sombreffe
- 2008–2017: Brussels
- 2017-2018: Pau-Orthez
- 2018-2020: Brussels
- 2020-2021: Gravelines-Dunkerque
- 2021-2022: Le Portel
- 2023-present: Brussels

Serge Crèvecœur (born 1 October 1971 in Brussels) is a Belgian basketball coach.

A former amateur player in Belgium’s lower divisions, he later began a gradual coaching career. He rose through the ranks of Belgian basketball with various clubs, from provincial leagues to the top national division, where he became a key figure at Excelsior Brussels. He had three brief coaching stints in France. Since 2023, he has been the head coach of Brussels Basketball (Excelsior) in the BNXT League.

== Career ==
Serge Crèvecœur, born in Ixelles, Belgium, is the son of former coach Guy Crèvecœur. He started playing basketball young and began coaching while studying business engineering at the Solvay School. Initially working in banking, he shifted fully to basketball in the mid-2000s.

He first gained attention by coaching BC Sombreffe to a regional title and promotion. In 2008, he took over Excelsior Brussels (later Basic-Fit Brussels), helping the club climb from the third division to Belgium’s top league. Under his leadership, Brussels made a surprise run to the league finals in 2017, and he was nominated for Coach of the Year.

In 2017, he joined French club Pau-Lacq-Orthez but left mid-season. He returned to Brussels for the 2018-19 as both head coach and GM, leading the team to playoff semifinals and a Belgian Cup semifinal. He stepped down in early 2020.

Crèvecœur then coached BCM Gravelines-Dunkerque, but the COVID-19 pandemic cut the season short. He stayed on for another year but was dismissed in 2021. He briefly led ESSM Le Portel in 2021–2022, departing amid poor results and limited support.

In 2023, he returned to Brussels again as head coach and GM, overseeing a roster rebuild.

He also served as an assistant coach for the Belgium men's national basketball team from 2017 to 2018.
