= Steve Ross (basketball) =

Canadian basketball player

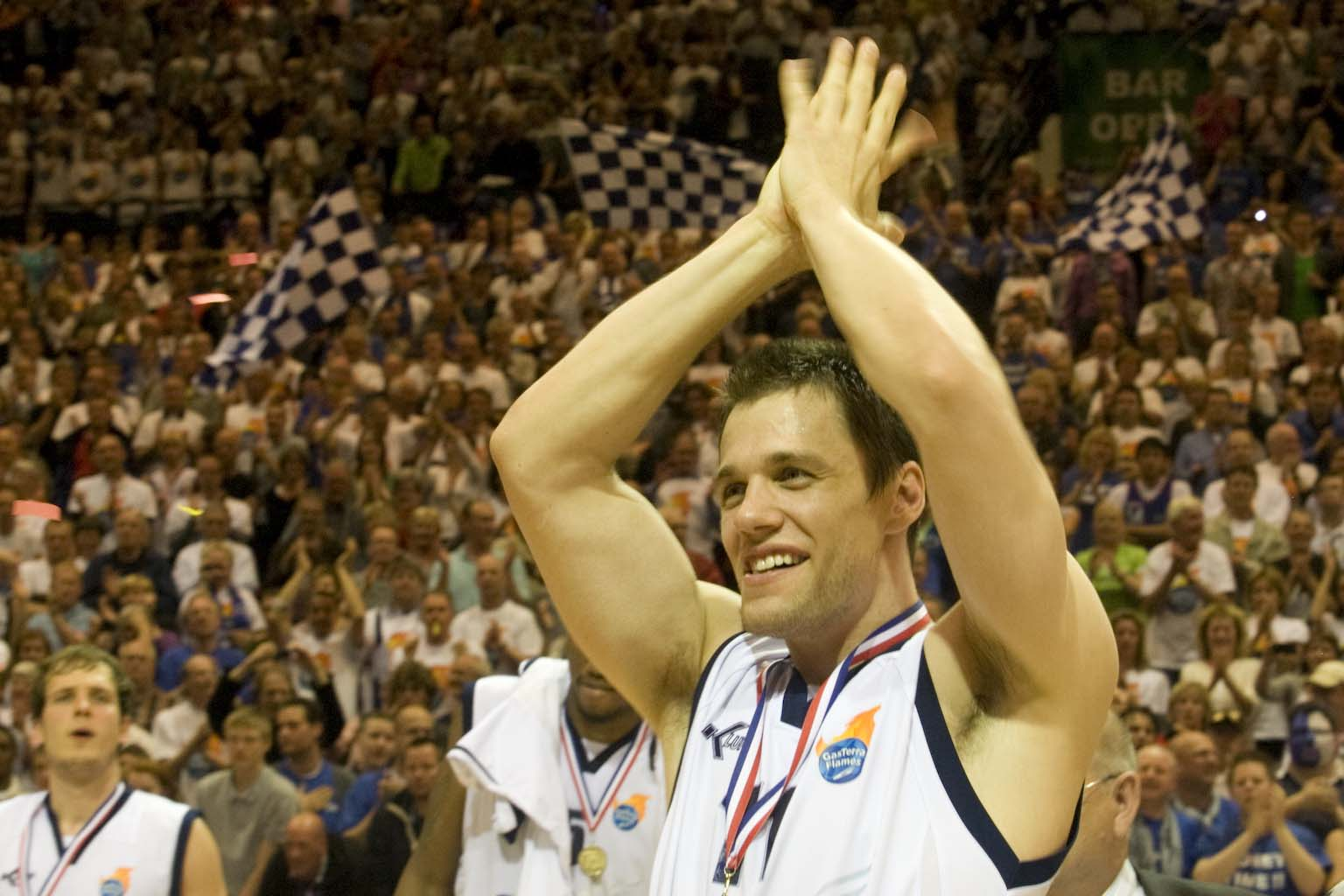
- Ross celebrating winning the DBL championship in 2010

Personal information
- Born: November 10, 1980 (age 46) Kamloops, British Columbia
- Listed height: 6 ft 7 in (2.01 m)

Career information
- High school: Lambrick Park (Victoria, British Columbia)
- College: San Diego (1998–2000); Santa Clara (2000–2002)
- NBA draft: 2002: undrafted
- Playing career: 2002–2014
- Position: Small forward

Career history
- 2002–2003: Rodez
- 2003–2004: Urcuit
- 2004: Fayetteville Patriots
- 2004–2005: FC Mulhouse
- 2006–2007: Levallois SCB
- 2007: ASVEL
- 2007–2008: ZZ Leiden
- 2008–2009: Upstairs Weert
- 2009–2011: Donar
- 2011–2012: SCM CSU Craiova
- 2012–2013: U-Mobitelco Cluj-Napoca
- 2013–2014: Brussels

Career highlights
- Dutch League champion (2010); Dutch Cup champion (2011)

Stephen Douglas Ross (born November 10, 1980) is a Canadian former professional basketball player.

== Professional career ==
Ross signed with Donar (then known as GasTerra Flames after their sponsor) of the Dutch Basketball League (DBL) in 2009. He was a part of the league winning squad in 2010 and won the NBB Cup in 2011.

In the 2011–12 season, Ross played in Romania for SCM CSU Craiova. In the 2012–13 season he played for another Romanian club, U-Mobitelco Cluj-Napoca.

He signed with Belgian team Excelsior Brussels, that was preparing for its first Ethias League season in history for the 2013–14 season.

== National team career ==
Ross played for the Canada national team and played at the 2002 FIBA World Championship, held in Indianapolis. He played in three games, and scored 17 points in a classification round win against Lebanon.

== Honours ==
Donar

- Dutch Basketball League: (2010)
- NBB Cup: (2011)
