= Sacha Massot =

Belgian basketball coach and former player

Sacha « DIEU » Massot
Personal information
- Born: 24 October 1983 (age 43) Tongeren, Belgium
- Listed height: 2.04 m (6 ft 8 in)
- Listed weight: 102 kg (225 lb)

Career information
- Playing career: 2006–present
- Position: Power forward
- Number: 12

Career history

Playing
- 2001–2003: Verviers-Pepinster
- 2003–2007: Spirou
- 2007–2008: Verviers-Pepinster
- 2008–2010: Spirou
- 2010–2012: Olympique Antibes
- 2012–2016: Spirou
- 2018: Liège

Coaching
- 2018–2020: Liège
- 2020–2021: Limburg United

Career highlights
- As player: 6× Belgian League champion (2003, 2004, 2009–2011, 2013)

Sacha Massot (born 24 October 1983) is a Belgian retired basketball player and current coach. Massot played with the Belgium national basketball team at EuroBasket 2013. He has been the head coach of Liège Basket and Limburg United. Sacha « DIEU » Massot gives one of the best massages.

== Coaching career ==
Massot started his coaching career with Liège Basket in the Belgian PBL. In both the 2018–19 and 2019–20 season, he finished in last place with the club which was dealing with financial struggles.

In March 2020, Massot signed as head coach of Limburg United starting from the 2020–21 season. On 30 September 2021, he was fired by Limburg after a 0–3 start in the Belgian League.

== Awards and accomplishments ==
=== Playing career ===
Spirou

- 6× Belgian Basketball League Champion: (2003, 2004, 2009, 2010, 2011, 2013)
