= Jason Clark (basketball) =

American basketball player (born 1990)

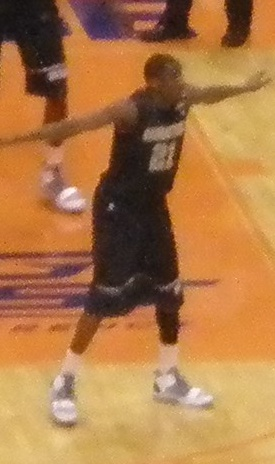

Free Agent
- Position: Shooting guard

Personal information
- Born: January 16, 1990 (age 36) Arlington, Virginia, U.S.
- Listed height: 1.88 m (6 ft 2 in)
- Listed weight: 82 kg (181 lb)

Career information
- High school: Bishop O'Connell (Arlington, Virginia)
- College: Georgetown (2008–2012)
- NBA draft: 2012: undrafted
- Playing career: 2012–present

Career history
- 2012–2013: Okapi Aalstar
- 2013–2014: Spirou Charleroi
- 2014: BG Göttingen
- 2014: Okapi Aalstar
- 2014–2016: Ankara DSİ
- 2016–2018: Antwerp Giants
- 2018–2019: Fraport Skyliners
- 2019–2020: Pallacanestro Varese
- 2020–2021: Basket Torino
- 2021–2022: BC Tsmoki-Minsk

Career highlights
- PBL Most Valuable Player (2017); Belarusian Cup MVP (2021)

Jason D'Martez Clark (born January 16, 1990) is an American professional basketball player who last played for BC Tsmoki-Minsk of the Belarus Premier League and the VTB United League. Clark usually plays as shooting guard.

== Professional career ==
On July 5, 2012, Clark signed with Okapi Aalstar of the Belgian Basketball League.

On August 8, 2013, Clark signed a contract with Spirou Charleroi for the 2013–14 season.

On September 7, 2014, Clark signed an 8-week contract with BG Göttingen of the German Basketball Bundesliga. On October 24, 2014, Clark returned to Okapi Aalstar by signing a 1-year deal.

On June 25, 2016, Clark signed with Antwerp Giants for the 2016–17 season. After the regular season of the Belgian League, Clark was named Most Valuable Player.

Clark signed with the Fraport Skyliners on August 8, 2018.

On July 25, 2019, he signed with Pallacanestro Varese of the Italian Lega Basket Serie A. After the outbreak of the coronavirus pandemic in Italy, Clark decided to leave the team before the end of the season and reach his family in US.

On July 23, 2020, Clark signed with Basket Torino of Italian Serie A2 Basket. He averaged 14.5 points, 3.5 rebounds, 2.1 assists, and 1.4 steals per game.

On October 1, 2021, Clark signed with BC Tsmoki-Minsk of the Belarus Premier League and the VTB United League.
