= Lionel Bosco =

Belgian professional basketball player

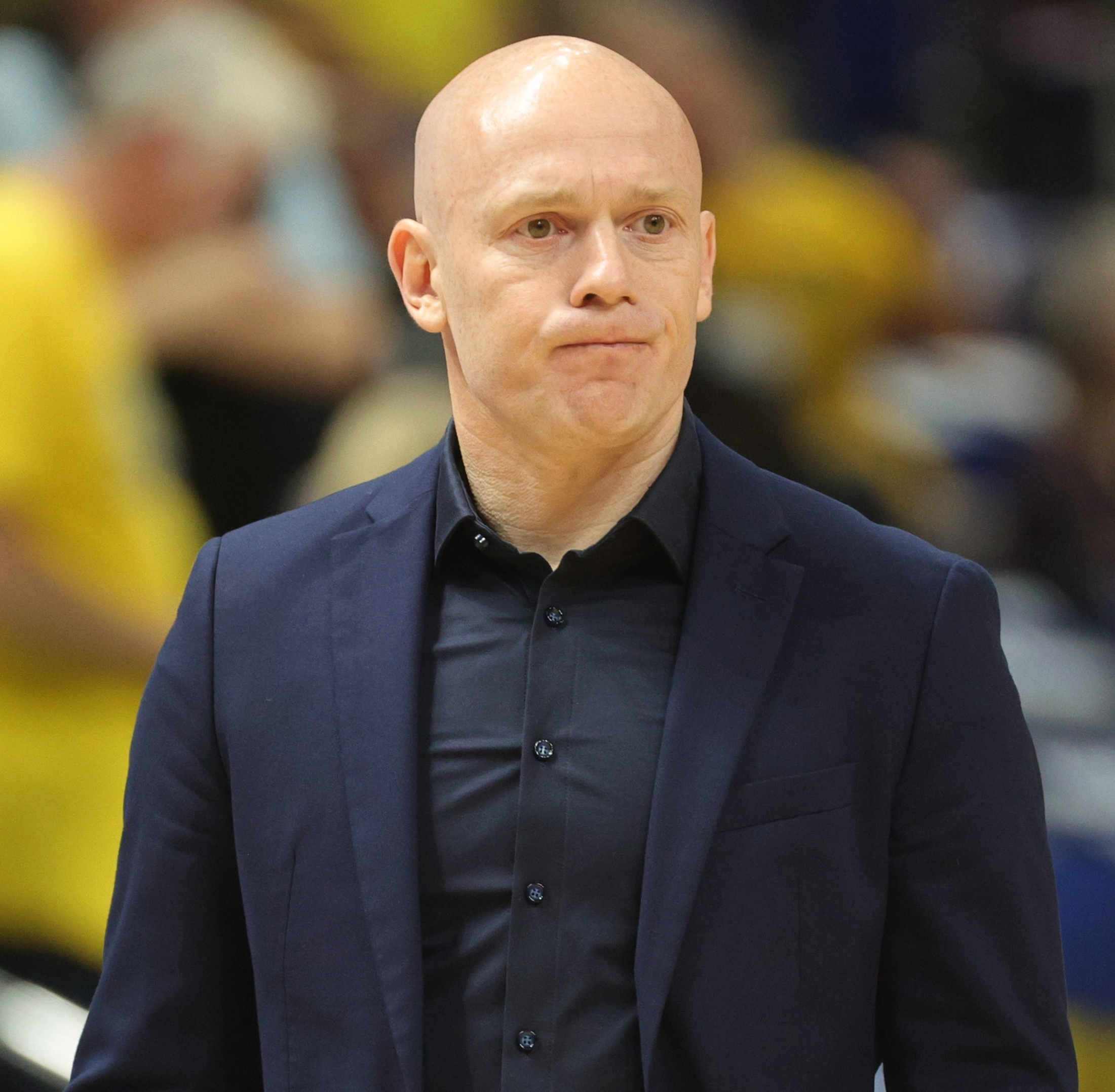

Telekom Baskets Bonn
- Title: Assistant coach
- League: Basketball Bundesliga; Champions League

Personal information
- Born: 18 September 1981 (age 45) Huy, Belgium
- Listed height: 5 ft 10.8 in (1.80 m)
- Listed weight: 183 lb (83 kg)

Career information
- NBA draft: 2003: undrafted
- Playing career: 2005–2018
- Position: Point guard
- Coaching career: 2019–present

Career history

Playing
- 2005–2007: Atomics Brussels
- 2007: JL Bourg
- 2007–2008: Leuven Bears
- 2008–2012: Optima Gent
- 2012–2014: Liège
- 2014–2017: Mons-Hainaut
- 2017–2018: Brussels

Coaching
- 2019–2020: Liège Basket (assistant)
- 2020–2023: Liège Basket
- 2023–present: Telekom Baskets Bonn
- 2025–present: Belgium (men)

Lionel Bosco (born 18 September 1981) is a Belgian former professional basketball player and current assistant coach of Telekom Baskets Bonn of the Basketball Bundesliga and the Champions League. He is also the head coach for the Belgian national team.

== Coaching career ==
After his playing career, Bosco became assistant coach of Liège Basket. In March 2020, he was appointed as new head coach after Sacha Massot left the team.

In June 2023, he signed a contract as assistant coach with the Telekom Baskets Bonn of the German easycredit BBL.

== International career ==
He represented Belgium at the 2015 EuroBasket where the team was eliminated by Greece in eighth finals, losing 75–54.
