= Braian Angola =

Colombian basketball player (born 1994)

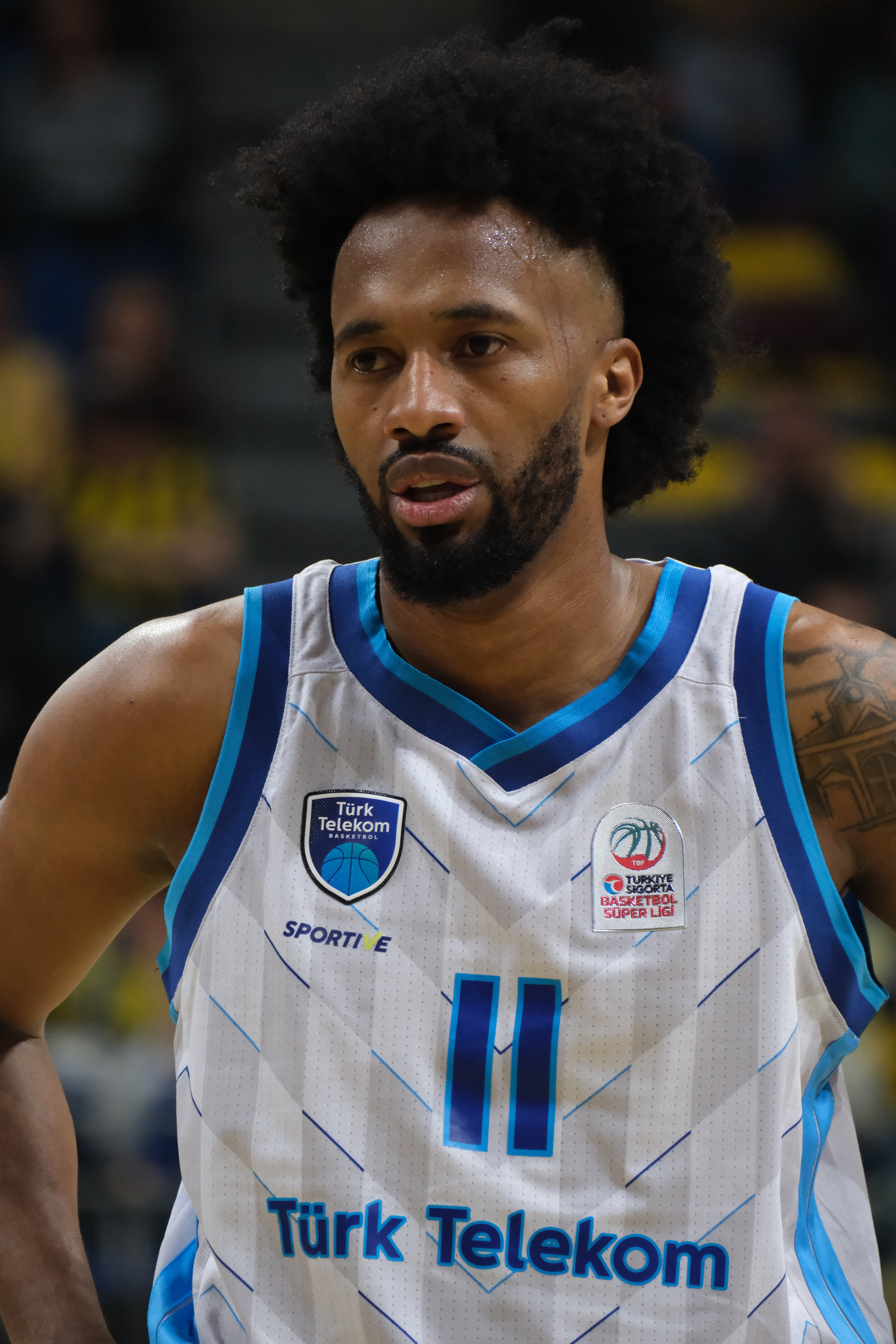
- Angola with Türk Telekom in 2025

No. 6 – Toyama Grouses
- Position: Small forward / shooting guard
- League: B.League

Personal information
- Born: April 6, 1994 (age 32) Villanueva, Colombia
- Listed height: 6 ft 6 in (1.98 m)
- Listed weight: 195 lb (88 kg)

Career information
- High school: Findlay Prep (Henderson, Nevada)
- College: North Idaho College (2014–2016); Florida State (2016–2018)
- NBA draft: 2018: undrafted
- Playing career: 2018–present

Career history
- 2018–2019: Lakeland Magic
- 2019–2020: Oostende
- 2020: Partizan Belgrade
- 2020–2021: Ironi Ness Ziona
- 2021–2022: AEK Athens
- 2022: Galatasaray
- 2022–2023: Karşıyaka
- 2023–2024: Hapoel Tel Aviv
- 2024–2025: Türk Telekom
- 2025–2026: Gran Canaria
- 2026: ASVEL
- 2026–present: Toyama Grouses

Career highlights
- FIBA Europe Cup champion (2021); Belgian League champion (2019); Belgian League Finals MVP (2019); First-team NJCAA All-American (2016)
- Stats at Basketball Reference

Braian Alexander Angola-Rodas (born April 6, 1994) is a Colombian professional basketball player for the Toyama Grouses of the Japanese B.League. He played college basketball for the Florida State Seminoles. The 6 ft 6 in (1.98 m) swingman competed for Findlay Prep in high school, before playing at North Idaho College for his first two college seasons. He has represented the Colombia national basketball team.

== Early life ==
Angola was born in Villanueva, Casanare in Colombia to Ofelia Rodas and Hugo Angola. His mother and two younger sisters, Karol and Michel, and brother Jhon Fredy, supported his decision to start playing basketball. At age 14, Angola moved alone to the United States to continue his basketball career, despite not speaking any English. In his early years, he drew attention for his success on the Colombian youth national team.

== High school career ==
At the high school level, Angola represented Findlay Prep, a basketball program based in Henderson, Nevada. Although mostly separated from his family, he often visited them in Colombia. In the 2012–13 season, he averaged 10.0 points, 3.0 rebounds and 2.0 assists with a .500 field goal percentage. Angola helped his team finish with a 35–1 record and a Final Four bid at the DICK'S Sporting Goods High School Nationals tournament. While at Findlay Prep, he was most notably teammates with Nigel Williams-Goss, future college star with the Gonzaga Bulldogs. His time with the team was credited for improving his English.

== College career ==
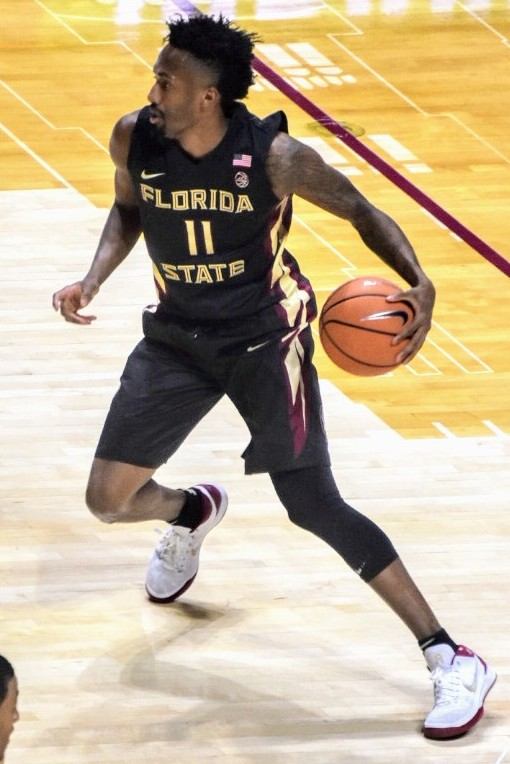
Angola in 2018

Angola first attended North Idaho College in Coeur d'Alene, Idaho, where he played under head coach Corey Symons and George Swanson. As a freshman, he averaged 13.8 points, 6.4 rebounds and 3.4 assists per game, leading the team to a 23–7 record. In his sophomore season, Angola posted 21.4 points, 6.5 rebounds and 4.3 assists per game en route to earning National Junior College Athletic Association (NJCAA) Division I All-America First Team honors. He also helped the team finish with a 31–2 record, starting the season on a 31-game winning streak.

After receiving offers from several major NCAA Division I programs heading into his junior season, Angola transferred to Florida State in April 2016. He saw a limited role as a first-year member of the team, averaging 4.6 points, 1.6 rebounds, and 1.2 assists per game. In his senior season he put 12.5 points, 3.9 rebounds and 3.0 assists per game on a team that reached the Elite Eight of the NCAA Tournament.

== Professional career ==
=== Lakeland Magic (2018–2019) ===
After going undrafted in the 2018 NBA draft, Angola was signed to play for the Orlando Magic for the 2018 NBA Summer League. On October 13, 2018, he was waived by the Magic. On October 29, 2018, Angola was included in the final 12-man roster for the Lakeland Magic.

=== Filou Oostende (2019–2020) ===
On April 18, 2019, Filou Oostende of the Pro Basketball League announced they had added Angola. On June 13, 2019, Angola helped Filou Oostende in winning the Pro Basketball League title after a 3–1 win in final against Telenet Antwerp Giants, and named PBL Finals MVP. He averaged 13.5 points, 4.2 rebounds, 2.5 assists and 1.3 steals per game.

=== Partizan Belgrade (2020) ===
On February 15, 2020, Angola signed with Partizan Belgrade. In two ABA league games, he averaged 3.0 points and 2.0 rebounds per game. Angola parted ways with the team on November 18.

=== Ironi Nes Ziona (2020–2021) ===
On November 26, 2020, Angola signed a contract with Ironi Nes Ziona of the Israeli Basketball Premier League.

=== AEK Athens (2021–2022) ===
On August 24, 2021, Angola signed a two-year deal with Greek club AEK Athens of the Basketball Champions League. He was sidelined for a significant portion of the season due to myocardial complications during his COVID-19 recovery. In 13 league games, Angola averaged 13 points (shooting with 35% from the 3-point line), 3.8 rebounds, 2.7 assists and 1 steal, playing around 24 minutes per contest. On July 24, 2022, Angola amicably parted ways with the Greek club.

=== Galatasaray (2022) ===
On 25 July 2022, he signed with Galatasaray Nef of the Turkish Basketbol Süper Ligi (BSL). He averaged 5.8 points, 2.4 rebounds, and 1.8 assists per game.

=== Karşıyaka (2022–2023) ===
On 16 November 2022, Angola signed with Pınar Karşıyaka of the Turkish Basketbol Süper Ligi (BSL). He averaged 14.2 points 4.5 rebounds, and 2.6 assists per game in the Basketball Champions League. He averaged 14.9 points, 4.8 rebounds, and 4.8 assists in the Turkish BSL League.

=== Hapoel Tel Aviv (2022–2024) ===
On August 1, 2023, he signed with Hapoel Tel Aviv of the Israeli Basketball Premier League and EuroCup.

=== Türk Telekom (2024–2025) ===
On October 16, 2024, Angola signed with Türk Telekom B.K. of Basketbol Süper Ligi after being released from his contract with Hapoel Tel Aviv.

=== Gran Canaria (2025–2026) ===
On July 7, 2025, he signed with Gran Canaria of the Spanish Liga ACB and the Basketball Champions League.

=== ASVEL (2026) ===
On January 21, 2026, he signed with ASVEL of the French LNB Élite.

=== Toyama Grouses (2026–present) ===
On August 9, 2026, Angola signed with the Toyama Grouses of the Japanese B.League.

== International career ==
Angola played for the Colombia national basketball team at the 2017 FIBA AmeriCup, where he averaged 12.7 points, 5.7 rebounds, and 2.0 assists per game.
