= Tonye Jekiri =

Nigerian basketball player

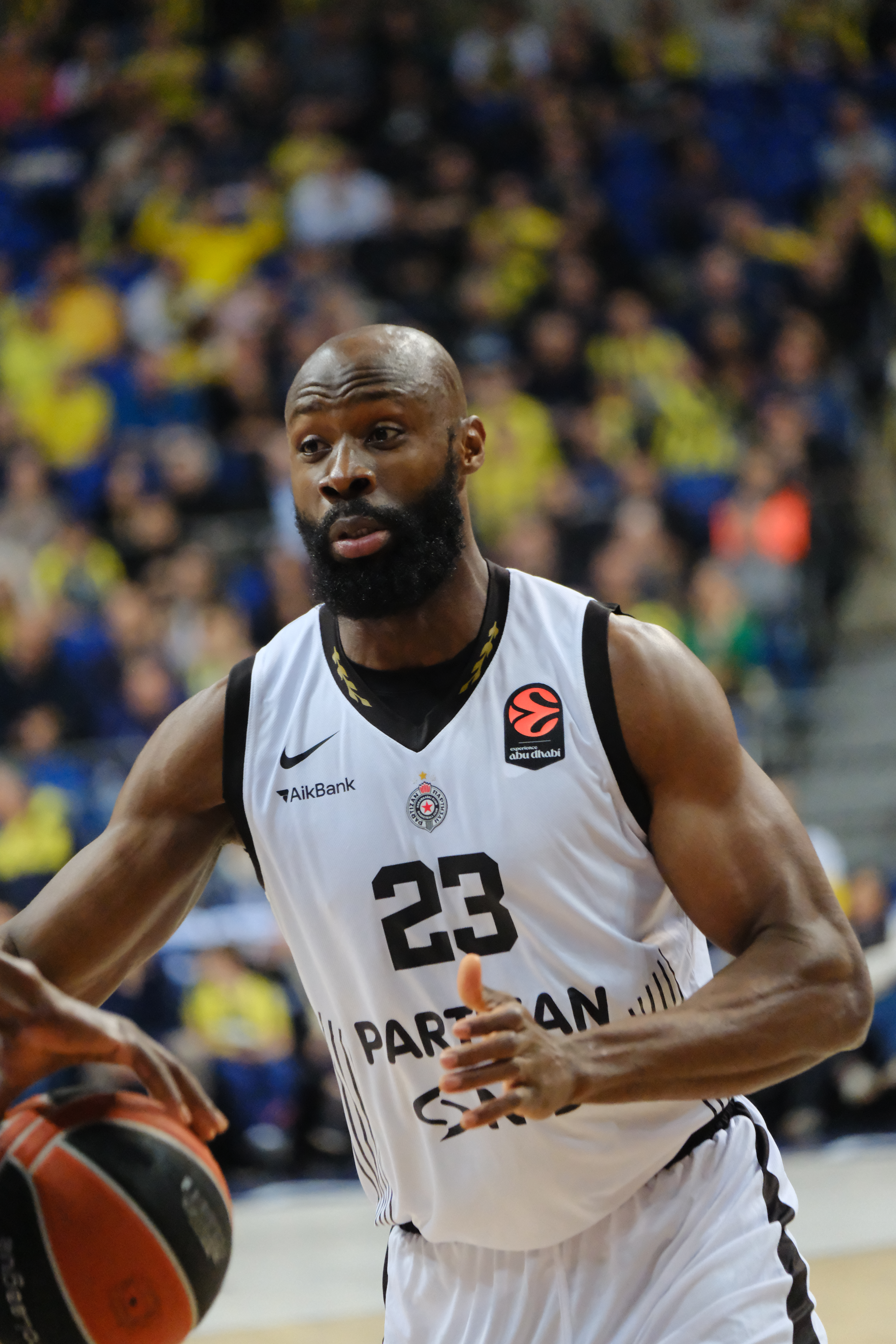
- Jekiri with Partizan in 2026

No. 23 – Partizan Belgrade
- Position: Center
- League: Serbian SuperLeague; ABA League; EuroLeague

Personal information
- Born: 23 July 1994 (age 32) Port Harcourt, Rivers State, Nigeria
- Listed height: 7 ft 0 in (2.13 m)
- Listed weight: 260 lb (118 kg)

Career information
- High school: Champagnat Catholic School (Hialeah, Florida)
- College: Miami (Florida) (2012–2016)
- NBA draft: 2016: undrafted
- Playing career: 2016–present

Career history
- 2016–2017: Bandırma Kırmızı
- 2017–2018: Oostende
- 2018–2019: Gaziantep
- 2019–2020: ASVEL
- 2020–2021: Baskonia
- 2021–2022: UNICS Kazan
- 2022–2023: Fenerbahçe
- 2023–2025: CSKA Moscow
- 2026–present: Partizan

Career highlights
- VTB United League champion (2024, 2025); VTB United League Supercup winner (2024, 2025); Belgian League champion (2018); Belgian League Finals MVP (2018); All-Belgian League Defensive Team (2018); Belgian League rebounding leader (2018)

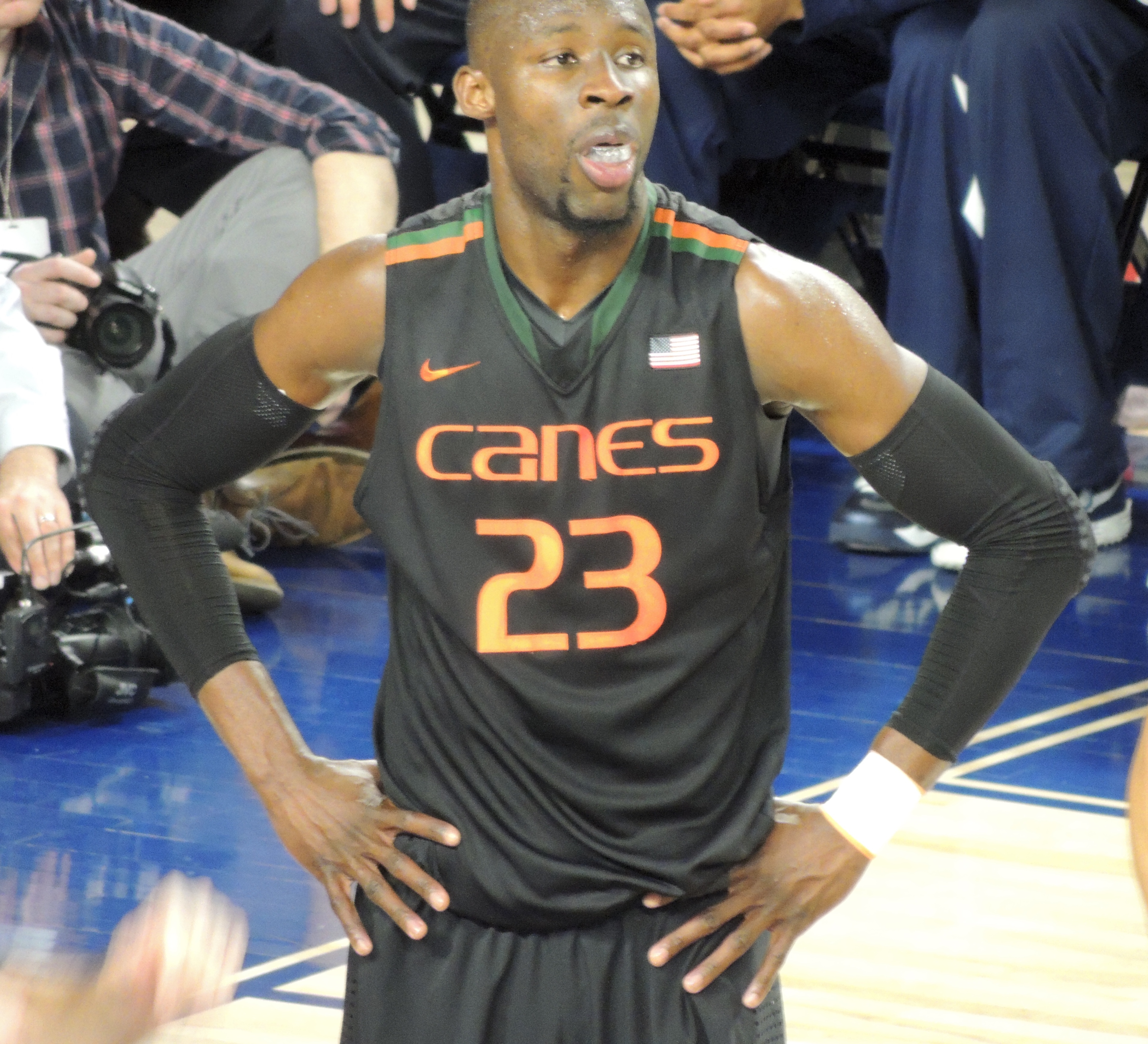
Jekiri in a 2015 game for Miami

Tonye Frank Jekiri (born 23 July 1994) is a Nigerian professional basketball player for Partizan Belgrade of the Serbian SuperLeague, the ABA League, and the EuroLeague. He played college basketball for Miami Hurricanes.

== College career ==
Jekiri played four seasons for the Miami Hurricanes and participated in two Sweet 16s. As a senior, he averaged 7.6 points and 8.6 rebounds per game.

== Professional career ==
=== Bandırma Kırmızı (2016–2017) ===
Jekiri signed his first professional contract with Turkish team Bandırma Kırmızı of the Basketbol Süper Ligi.

=== Oostende (2017–2018) ===
In the 2017–18 season, Jekiri played with Oostende in the Belgian Pro Basketball League. With Oostende he won the championship, and was named the PBL Finals MVP. He was also the leading rebounder in the PBL, with 7.3 per game.

=== Gaziantep (2018–2019) ===
With the 2018-19 season, he turned back to the Turkey and Basketbol Süper Ligi with the Gaziantep.

=== ASVEL (2019–2020) ===
On 3 July 2019 Jekiri signed a one-year contract with LDLC ASVEL of the French LNB Pro A and first time he will play in the EuroLeague. He averaged 8.7 points and 7.5 rebounds per game in 27 games.

=== Baskonia (2020–2021) ===
On 11 July 2020 Jekiri officially signed a two-year contract with Baskonia of the Liga ACB and EuroLeague. He averaged 6.5 points and 4.8 rebounds per game.

=== UNICS Kazan (2021–2022) ===
On July 25, 2021, Jekiri signed with the Russian team UNICS Kazan of the VTB United League and the EuroLeague (until the club was suspended from competing due to the 2022 Russian invasion of Ukraine).

=== Fenerbahçe (2022–2023) ===
On June 27, 2022, Jekiri signed a two-year (1+1) contract with Turkish club Fenerbahçe of the Basketbol Süper Ligi and the EuroLeague . On July 14, 2023, Fenerbahçe opted out of their mutual contract and Jekiri became a free agent.

=== CSKA Moscow (2023–2025) ===
On July 20, 2023, he signed with CSKA Moscow of the VTB United League.

=== Partizan (2026–present) ===
On January 6, 2026, Jekiri signed with Partizan Mozzart Bet of the Serbian SuperLeague, the ABA League, and the EuroLeague.

On June 13, 2026, Jekiri signed a one-year contract extension with Partizan.

During the 2025–26 ABA League season, Jekiri averaged 9.6 points and 4.8 rebounds per game. In the EuroLeague, he averaged 7.5 points and 5.0 rebounds per game. He did not make any appearances in the Basketball League of Serbia or the Radivoj Korać Cup.

== Career statistics ==
Legend
| GP | Games played | GS | Games started | MPG | Minutes per game |
| FG% | Field-goal percentage | 3P% | 3-point field-goal percentage | FT% | Free-throw percentage |
| RPG | Rebounds per game | APG | Assists per game | SPG | Steals per game |
| BPG | Blocks per game | PPG | Points per game | PIR | Performance index rating |
| **Bold** | Career high |

=== EuroLeague ===
| Year | Team | GP | GS | MPG | FG% | 3P% | FT% | RPG | APG | SPG | BPG | PPG | PIR |
|---|---|---|---|---|---|---|---|---|---|---|---|---|---|
| 2019–20 | ASVEL | 27 | **23** | **23.9** | .524 | .000 | **.662** | **7.5** | 1.3 | .8 | .3 | **8.7** | **12.8** |
| 2020–21 | Baskonia | **30** | 14 | 18.8 | .510 | .000 | .643 | 4.9 | **1.9** | .7 | **.4** | 6.0 | 8.4 |
| 2021–22 | UNICS Kazan | 24 | 6 | 24.5 | .631 | .000 | .622 | 6.5 | 1.0 | **1.0** | .3 | 7.6 | 12.2 |
| 2022–23 | Fenerbahçe | **30** | 10 | 13.5 | **.663** | .000 | **.733** | 3.2 | 1.0 | .5 | .2 | 4.9 | 6.8 |
| Career | | 111 | 53 | 19.8 | .569 | .000 | .660 | 5.4 | 1.3 | .7 | .3 | 6.7 | 9.9 |

=== College ===
| Year | Team | GP | GS | MPG | FG% | 3P% | FT% | RPG | APG | SPG | BPG | PPG |
|---|---|---|---|---|---|---|---|---|---|---|---|---|
| 2012–13 | Miami | 34 | 0 | 6.9 | .514 | .000 | .550 | 1.6 | .1 | .2 | .3 | 1.4 |
| 2013–14 | Miami | 32 | 16 | 21.4 | .456 | .000 | .581 | 5.5 | .7 | **.6** | .9 | 4.2 |
| 2014–15 | Miami | **37** | **37** | **30.3** | .500 | **1.000** | **.729** | **9.9** | **1.2** | **.6** | **1.3** | **8.6** |
| 2015–16 | Miami | 35 | 35 | 28.4 | **.525** | .000 | .576 | 8.6 | .8 | .4 | 1.0 | 7.6 |
| Career | | 139 | 88 | 21.9 | .501 | .200 | .640 | 6.5 | .7 | .5 | .9 | 5.5 |

Source: RealGM
