= Pro Basketball League Finals MVP =

The Pro Basketball League Finals MVP is an annual award of the Pro Basketball League (PBL), the highest tier professional basketball league in Belgium, given to the league's most valuable player in the finals. The award was first handed out in the 2017–18 season.

== Winners ==
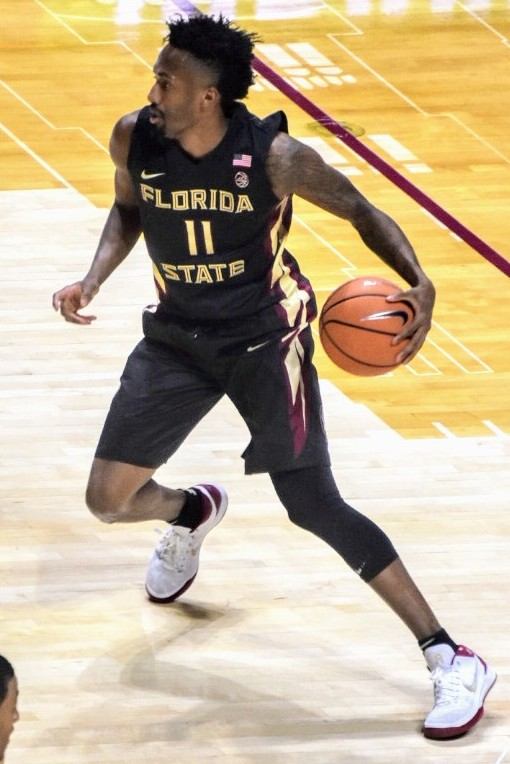
Braian Angola won the inaugural award in 2019

^	Denotes player who is still active in the PBL
*	Inducted into the Naismith Memorial Basketball Hall of Fame
Player (X)	Denotes the number of times the player had been named MVP at that time

Season	Player	Position	Nationality	Team	Ref.
2013	Matt Lojeski	Guard	Belgium (Note: Born in the United States, Lojeski represents Belgium in FIBA competition since May 2013.)	Oostende	
2018	Tonye Jekiri	Center	Nigeria	Oostende	
2019	Braian Angola	Guard	Colombia	Filou Oostende	
2021	Loïc Schwartz	Guard	Belgium	Filou Oostende	
