= Tucker Richardson =

American basketball player (born 1999)

No. 15 – Brussels Basketball
- Position: Small forward
- League: BNXT League

Personal information
- Born: August 15, 1999 (age 27) Flemington, New Jersey, U. S.
- Listed height: 6 ft 5 in (1.96 m)
- Listed weight: 215 lb (98 kg)

Career information
- High school: Hunterdon Central (Flemington, New Jersey); Blair Academy (Blairstown, New Jersey)
- College: Colgate (2018–2023)
- NBA draft: 2023: undrafted
- Playing career: 2023–present

Career history
- 2023–2024: BC Nokia
- 2024–2025: Brussels Basketball
- 2025–2026: HLA Alicante
- 2026: KTP Basket
- 2026–present: Brussels Basketball

Career highlights
- Korisliiga champion (2024); Patriot League Player of the Year (2023); Patriot League Defensive Player of the Year (2023); 2× First-team All-Patriot League (2022, 2023); Third-team All-Patriot League (2021); Patriot League Rookie of the Year (2019); Patriot League tournament MVP (2023)

Tucker Allen Richardson is an American professional basketball player for Brussels Basketball of the BNXT League. He played college basketball for the Colgate Raiders.

== Early life and high school ==
Richardson grew up in Flemington, New Jersey and attended Hunterdon Central Regional High School. He was named the Hunterdon County Player of the Year after averaging 18.1 points, 7.4 rebounds, 4.8 assists, and 3.5 steals per game in his senior season. Richardson opted to enroll at Blair Academy for a postgraduate year.

== College career ==
Richardson became the Colgate Raiders' starting shooting guard early into his freshman season and was named the Patriot League Rookie of the Year after averaging 8.1 points, 4.2 rebounds, and 3.8 assists per game. He averaged 10.3 points, 4.7 rebounds, and 2.8 assists per game as a sophomore. Richardson was named third team All-Patriot League after averaging 11.6 points, 5.8 rebounds, 4.3 assists, and 1.3 steals per game during his junior season. He was named first-team All-Patriot League as a senior after averaging 12.7 points and 5.7 rebounds per game.

Richardson decided to utilize the extra year of eligibility granted to college athletes who played in the 2020 season due to the coronavirus pandemic and return to Colgate for a fifth season. He scored 30 points in the Raiders' 80-68 upset win over Syracuse. Richardson was named the Patriot League Player of the Year, Defensive Player of the Year, and Scholar-Athlete of the Year at the end of the regular season. Richardson was also named the Most Valuable Player of the 2023 Patriot League men's basketball tournament after recording a triple-double with 14 points, 12 rebounds, and 11 assists in the final against Lafayette. It was the first triple-double in a Division I conference title game in 25 seasons. Richardson was selected to play in the Reese's College All-Star Game after the end of his senior season.

In his career, he led Colgate to four appearances in the NCAA Tournament, and he is Colgate's all-time program leader in games played (155), wins (110), assists (626), steals (221), and three-point field goals made (268).

== Professional career ==
Richardson signed with BC Nokia of the Finnish Korisliiga to begin his professional career in July 2023. He averaged 16.5 points, 7.4 rebounds, 4.7 assists and 1.8 steals per game as BC Nokia won the Korisliiga.

Richardson signed with Brussels Basketball of the Belgian and Dutch BNXT League in July 2024.

In October of 2025, Richardson joined HLA Alicante of the Spanish Primera FEB second division league. He didn't finish the season there, as he was let go 20th of February 2026. He signed for KTP Basket for the rest of the season in the Korisliiga There, he participated in the Finnish play-offs again, but was eliminated by the Helsinki Seagulls in the quarterfinals.

On July 3, 2026, he signed with Brussels Basketball of the BNXT League for a second stint.
