= Domien Loubry =

Belgian basketball player

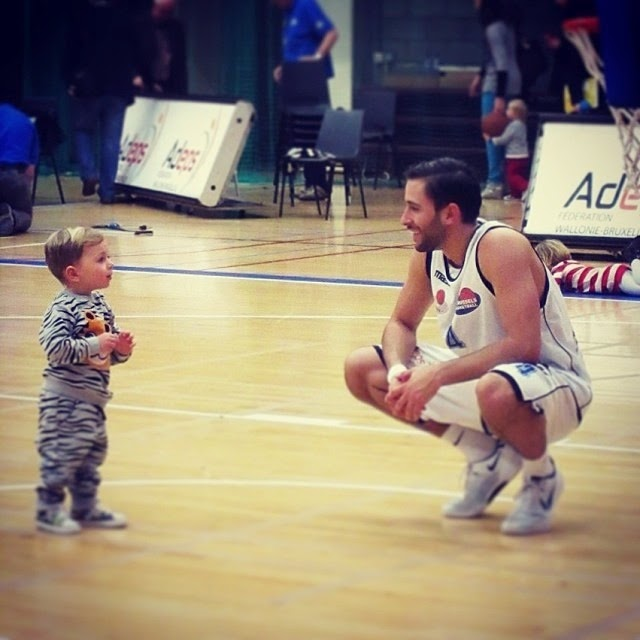

Kontich Wolves
- Position: Point guard
- League: TDM1

Personal information
- Born: 3 March 1985 (age 40); Antwerp, Belgium
- Listed height: 1.85 m (6 ft 1 in)
- Listed weight: 83 kg (183 lb)

Career information
- NBA draft: 2007: undrafted
- Playing career: 2005–present

Career history
- 2005–2006: Antwerp Giants
- 2006–2007: West-Brabant Giants
- 2009–2011: Optima Gent
- 2011–2013: Gembo
- 2013–2020: Phoenix Brussels
- 2020–2025: Kangoeroes Mechelen
- 2025–present: Kontich Wolves

Career highlights
- BNXT League champion (2025); PBL assists leader (2014)

Domien Loubry (born 3 March 1985) is a Belgian professional basketball player for Kontich Wolves of the Top Division Men 1 (TDM1). Loubry plays as point guard.

On June 16, 2025, he signed with Kontich Wolves of the Top Division Men 1 (TDM1).

== Professional career ==
On 3 March 2020, Loubry signed with Kangoeroes Mechelen for the 2020–21 season. In his first season with Mechelen, he averaged 11.7 points and 4.7 assists per game, while also leading his team to the final of the Belgian Basketball Cup for the first time.

== National team career ==
In 2013, Loubry joined Brussels which was just promoted to the first level Pro Basketball League. He stayed with Brussels for six seasons, helping the team become the runners-up of the PBL in 2017.

In 2008, Loubry was selected for the preliminary squad of the Belgium national basketball team by head coach Eddy Casteels. A year later, in 2009, he played his first international game.

== Honours ==
Individual

- Pro Basketball League assists leader: 2013–14
