= Brussels Basketball =

- Leagues: BNXT League
- Founded: 1958; 68 years ago
- History: Excelsior Brussels (1958–2013); Brussels Basketball (2013–2019); Phoenix Brussels (2019–2022); Brussels Basketball (2022–present)
- Arena: Neder-Over-Heembeek sports complex
- Capacity: 1,500
- Location: Brussels, Belgium
- Team colors: Blue, White
- President: André De Kandelaer
- Head coach: Serge Crèvecœur
- Team captain: Louis Hazard
- Website: www.brusselsbasketball.be

Brussels Basketball, also known as Excelsior Brussels, is a professional basketball club based in Neder-Over-Heembeek (Brussels), Belgium. The team competes in the BNXT League and hosts its home games at the Neder-Over-Heembeek sports complex, which has a capacity of up to 1,500 spectators.

== History ==
Founded in 1958 as the basketball section of Excelsior Brussels, the club spent decades in Belgium's lower leagues.

After six years in the third division, Serge Crèvecoeur joined in 2008 and immediately led the team to promotion to the second division. Over the next seasons, Excelsior steadily improved, finishing 4th and 5th with quarterfinal appearances, then reaching the semifinals in 2011–12. Despite slipping to 10th and missing the playoffs in 2012–13, the club was promoted to the top Belgian division that year as part of an expansion to include a capital city team.

The club rebranded its first division team as Brussels Basketball to better promote the city and boost the league's appeal, with main sponsor Basic-Fit joining at the same time and influencing the name change to Basic-Fit Brussels. The rest of the club retained the Excelsior identity. The club received a C-licence, which allowed them to play with a lower budget in the league.

The first two seasons in the top division were marked by limited success, but the closed league format provided a stable environment for gradual growth. In their third season, they narrowly missed the playoff finals, which they reached the following year in 2016–17. Strong performances in both the 2015–16 and 2016–17 seasons earned them places in the FIBA Europe Cup.

Following the 2016–17 vice-championship, Crèvecoeur left and was replaced by assistant coach Laurent Monier. The 2017–18 season under Monier was less successful. Crèvecoeur returned for the 2018–19 season and immediately led the team to third place in the playoffs and a Belgian Cup semifinal.

In 2019, Basic-Fit withdrew as main sponsor, prompting a rebrand to Phoenix Brussels and an increased reliance on public funding and political support. The COVID-19 pandemic brought serious financial challenges, threatening the first team's survival, but the club ultimately endured.

As the club faced growing challenges, Serge Crèvecoeur departed once again. He was replaced by Ian Hanavan, who took charge for the 2020–21 season, the final season of the standalone Belgian league. Hanavan remained in place for the start of the 2021–22 campaign, marking the debut of the new BNXT League, but was quickly dismissed by the board due to underperformance. Jean-Marc Jaumin took over and managed to stabilize the team during the 2021–22 and 2022–23 seasons. During his tenure, the club secured a new main sponsor in betting platform Circus, rebranding as Circus Brussels. However, this naming ended in 2023 following a new law that banned gambling promotion in sports.

Serge Crèvecoeur returned ahead of the 2023–24 season. Over two seasons, he guided the team toward greater stability, resulting in the club's first playoff appearance since 2019 in 2024–25.

== Infrastructure ==
Upon the club's establishment in 1958, the team played outdoors on the field of the King Baudoin/Boudewijn Stadium (then the Heysel/Heizel Stadium). Brussels Basketball currently plays its home games in the multifunctional sports hall of the Neder-Over-Heembeek sports complex. The hall features retractable seating and typically accommodates around 1,000 spectators, though it can hold up to 1,500, as it did during the 2017 Belgian playoff finals against Oostende. Owned by the municipality rather than the club, this has historically led to scheduling and organisation conflicts.

Since 2017 the team regularly plays gala matches in Palais/Paleis 12. In the 2020–2021 season, the team made a temporary move to the venue for all games from December 2020 to April 2021.

The club recognized early the necessity of upgrading its infrastructure. In 2013, upon entering the first division, the president André De Kandelaer stated, "Our hall is not designed for the first division" and "If a serious project develops, it will certainly not be at Neder-Over-Heembeek". In 2017, a plan was unveiled for a 3,000-seat arena on the Heysel/Heizel Plateau, but it failed to materialize. In 2021, a more ambitious proposal for a 4,000-seat arena at the same location was introduced, though this project did not progress either.

== Honours ==
- Belgian League

Runners-up (1): 2016–17

== Names ==
Due to sponsorships and other reasons, the name of the club has frequently changed:

- Excelsior Brussels (1958–2013)
- Basic-Fit Brussels Basketball (2013–2019)
- Phoenix Brussels Basketball (2019–2022)
- Circus Brussels Basketball (2022–2023)
- Brussels Basketball (2023–present)

== Season by season ==
Season	Tier	League	Pos.	W–L	Belgian Cup	European competitions		
2008–09	3	Belgian 3rd Division	2nd					
2009–10	2	Belgian 2nd Division	5th					
2010–11	2	Belgian 2nd Division	5th					
2011–12	2	Belgian 2nd Division	4th					
2012–13	2	Belgian 2nd Division	10th					
2013–14	1	Belgian League	8th	8–28	Round of 16			
2014–15	1	Belgian League	10th	10–18	Round of 16			
2015–16	1	Belgian League	4th	21–16	Round of 16			
2016–17	1	Belgian League	2nd	28–19	Semifinalist	4 FIBA Europe Cup	RS	1–5
2017–18	1	Belgian League	8th	12–26	Quarterfinalist	3 Champions League	QR3	0–2
2017–18	1	Belgian League	8th	12–26	Quarterfinalist	4 FIBA Europe Cup	RS	2–4
2018–19	1	Belgian League	3rd	23–17	Semifinalist			
2019–20	1	Belgian League	9th	6–11	Quarterfinalist	4 FIBA Europe Cup	RS	2–4
2020–21	1	Belgian League	10th	4–22	Play-in Round			
2021–22	1	BNXT League	BE 9th	9–19	Quarterfinalist			
2021–22	1	BNXT League	BNXT 16th	9–19	Quarterfinalist			
2022–23	1	BNXT League	BE 10th	9–19	Quarterfinalist			
2022–23	1	BNXT League	BNXT 16th	9–19	Quarterfinalist			
2023-24	1	BNXT League	BE 6th	17–15	Quarterfinalist			
2023-24	1	BNXT League	BNXT 14th	17–15	Quarterfinalist			
2024-25	1	BNXT League	BE 5th	25–11	Round of 16			
2024-25	1	BNXT League	BNXT 5th	25–11	Round of 16			
2025-26	1	BNXT League	BE 7th	18–16	Round of 32	R European North League	RS	3-5
2025-26	1	BNXT League	BNXT 9th	18–16	Round of 32	R European North League	RS	3-5

== Players ==
=== Current roster ===
Brussels Basketball roster
Players
Coaches

Pos.	No.	Nat.	Name	Ht.	Age
G	1	(United States)	Person Jr., Wesley	1.91 m (6 ft 3 in)	31 – 1 August 1995
PG	3	(United States)	Boone, Eric	1.88 m (6 ft 2 in)	27 – 4 July 1999
G	4	(Belgium)	Bonsenge, Junior	1.88 m (6 ft 2 in)	22 – 1 November 2003
F/C	5	(United States)	Kimbrough, Jared	2.03 m (6 ft 8 in)	26 – 28 December 1999
G	8	(Belgium)	Ntesa, Douglas	1.83 m (6 ft 0 in)	23 – 2 August 2003
F	9	(Netherlands)	van den Elzen, Stan	1.96 m (6 ft 5 in)	26 – 27 May 2000
F	10	(Belgium)	Hazard, Louis (C)	1.99 m (6 ft 6 in)	28 – 13 January 1998
PF	11	(Ivory Coast)	Tapé, Patrick	2.06 m (6 ft 9 in)	28 – 8 June 1998
F	12	(Belgium)	Dammen, Yannick	1.96 m (6 ft 5 in)	27 – 26 April 1999
SF	15	(United States)	Richardson, Tucker	1.96 m (6 ft 5 in)	27 – 15 August 1999
C	22	(Belgium)	Schrevens, Arne	2.11 m (6 ft 11 in)	24 – 8 July 2002
F/C	24	(Belgium)	Tshimanga, Godwin	2.02 m (6 ft 8 in)	25 – 25 January 2001

Head coach

- (Belgium) Serge Crèvecœur

Assistant coach(es)

- (Greece) Theodoros Alexandridis
- (Belgium) Clément Jovanovic

Legend

- (C) Team captain
- Injured

- Roster
Updated: October 7, 2026

=== Notable players ===
Note: Flags indicate national team eligibility at FIBA-sanctioned events. Players may hold other non-FIBA nationalities not displayed.

Criteria

To appear in this section a player must have either:

- Set a club record or won an individual award while at the club
- Played at least one official international match for their national team at any time
- Played at least one official NBA match at any time.

- (Belgium) Lionel Bosco
- (Belgium) Domien Loubry
- (Belgium) Guy Muya
- (Belgium) Éric Struelens
- (Belgium) Jonathan Tabu
- (Belgium) Kevin Tumba
- (Bulgaria) Jason Washburn
- (Canada) Steve Ross
- (Central African Republic) Max Kouguère
- (Croatia) Ivan Karačić
- (Cuba) Sigfredo Casero-Ortiz
- (Finland) Okko Järvi
- (Ivory Coast) Patrick Tapé
- (Lithuania) Augustas Pečiukevičius
- (Rwanda) William Robeyns
- (Senegal) Pape Badji
- (Serbia) Dejan Kravić
- (Sweden) Thomas Massamba
- (Sweden) Dino Pita
- (United Kingdom) Ryan Richards
- (United States) Taylor Brown
- (United States) Chris Dowe
- (United States) Julian Gamble
- (United States) Brandon Ubel

== Head coaches ==
- (Belgium) Serge Crèvecœur: 2008–2017, 2018–2020, 2023–present
- (Belgium) Laurent Monier: 2017–2018, 2020
- (United States) (Belgium) Ian Hanavan: 2020–2021
- (Belgium) Jean-Marc Jaumin: 2021–2023
