= Aleksandar Zečević (basketball, born 1975) =

Bosnian basketball player

Personal information
- Born: June 29, 1975 (age 51) Sarajevo, SFR Yugoslavia (now Bosnia and Herzegovina)
- Listed height: 2.01 m (6 ft 7 in)

Career information
- NBA draft: 1997: undrafted
- Playing career: 1993–2012
- Position: Small forward
- Number: 11, 16, 31
- Coaching career: 2013–present

Career history

Playing
- 1993–1994: Crvena zvezda
- 1997–2001: Hemofarm
- 2001–2002: Bonn
- 2002–2003: UD Oliveirense
- 2003–2009: Verviers-Pepinster
- 2009: Olympique Antibes
- 2010: Leuven Bears
- 2012: Dinamo Tbilisi

Coaching
- 2013–2016: Bilzen
- 2016–2017: Pepinster

Career highlights
- YUBA League champion (1994)

Aleksandar Zečević (Serbian Cyrillic: Александар Зечевић; born June 29, 1975) is a Serbian professional basketball coach and former player.

== Playing career ==
Zečević played for the Crvena zvezda and Hemofarm of the Yugoslav League. In the 1993–94 season, he won the Yugoslav League with Zvezda and played together with Dragoljub Vidačić, Ivica Mavrenski, Saša Obradović, Mileta Lisica, Aleksandar Trifunović, and Dejan Tomašević. In the 2000–01 Hemofarm season, he played Korać Cup Finals where he lost from Spanish team Unicaja. Over sixteen games in that Korać Cup season, he averaged 16.3 points, 5.3 rebounds and 1.1 assists per game.

In 2001, he went abroad. During next ten years he played in Germany (Telekom Baskets Bonn), Portugal (U.D. Oliveirense), Belgium (RBC Verviers-Pepinster and Leuven Bears), France (Olympique Antibes), and Georgia (Dinamo Tbilisi).

Prior to 2003–04 season, Zečević signed for the RBC Verviers-Pepinster of the Belgium Division I. In 2003–04 ULEB Cup season he averaged 11.7 points, 2.3 rebounds and 1.2 assists per game over ten games. In 2004–05 FIBA Europe League season he averaged 20.0 points, 3.8 rebounds and 3.2 assists per game over thirteen games.

== Coaching career ==
In November 2016, Zečević became a head coach for the RBC Pepinster. He left Pepinster after the end of the 2016–17 season.

== Career achievements ==
- Yugoslav League champion: 1 (with Crvena zvezda: 1993–94)
- Portuguese Cup winner: 1 (with U.D. Oliveirense: 2002–03)
- Portuguese League Cup winner: 1 (with U.D. Oliveirense: 2002–03)
- Yugoslav Super Cup winner: 1 (with Crvena zvezda: 1993)
