= Doron Perkins =

American basketball player and coach (born 1983)

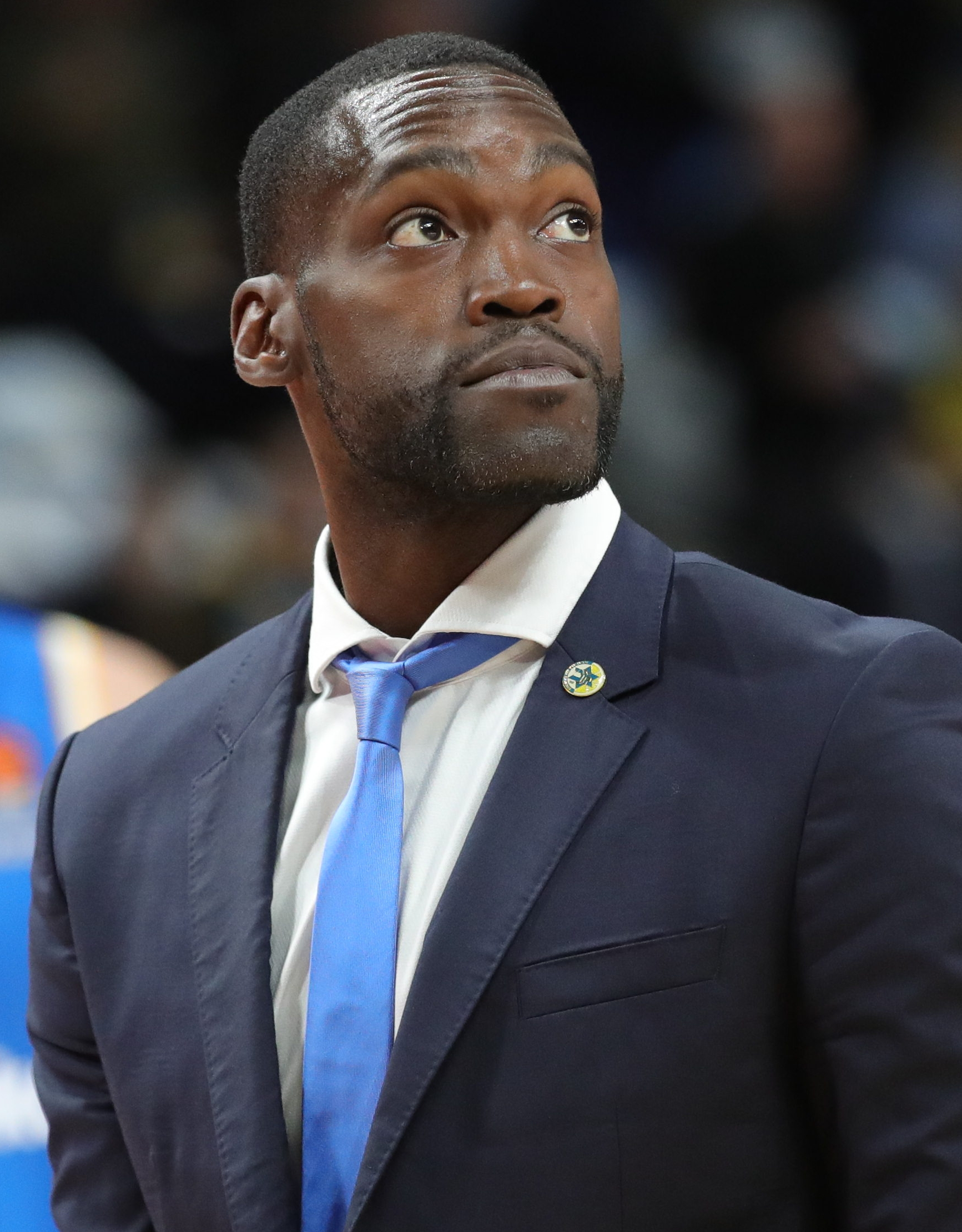
- Perkins as assistant coach with Maccabi Tel Aviv in 2022

Guangzhou Loong Lions
- Position: Head coach
- League: CBA

Personal information
- Born: May 6, 1983 (age 43) Anchorage, Alaska, U.S.
- Listed height: 6 ft 3 in (1.91 m)
- Listed weight: 212 lb (96 kg)

Career information
- High school: Bartlett (Anchorage, Alaska)
- College: Southwestern Oregon CC (2001–2003); Santa Clara (2003–2005)
- NBA draft: 2005: undrafted
- Playing career: 2005–2017
- Coaching career: 2021–present

Career history

Playing
- 2005–2006: Toyota Alvark
- 2006–2007: EWE Baskets Oldenburg
- 2007–2008: Euphony Bree
- 2008–2009: Maccabi Haifa
- 2009–2011: Maccabi Tel Aviv
- 2012: Bennet Cantù
- 2012: Donetsk
- 2013: Foshan Long Lions
- 2013: Olympiacos
- 2013–2014: Beşiktaş Integral Forex
- 2014: Laboral Kutxa
- 2015–2016: Yeşilgiresun Belediye
- 2016–2017: Sanat Naft Abadan

Coaching
- 2019–2021: Brooklyn Nets (assistant)
- 2021–2023: Maccabi Tel Aviv (assistant)
- 2023–2026: Cleveland Charge (assistant)
- 2026–present: Guangzhou Loong Lions

Career highlights
- As Player: EuroLeague champion (2013); Israeli League champion (2011); 2× Israeli Cup champion (2010, 2011); Japanese League MVP (2006); Israeli League MVP (2009); 2× Israeli League Defensive Player of the Year (2010, 2011); Belgian League steals leader (2008); 2× First-team All-WCC (2004, 2005)

Doron Marquis Perkins (born May 6, 1983) is an American professional basketball coach and former player who is the head coach for the Guangzhou Loong Lions of the Chinese Basketball Association (CBA). Standing at 1.91 m (6 ft 3 in) he can play as either a point guard or a shooting guard. He was the 2009 Israeli Basketball Premier League MVP, and the 2010 and 2011 Israeli Basketball Premier League Defensive Player of the Year.

== College career ==
Perkins played two years of college basketball at Santa Clara University with the Santa Clara Broncos, playing in the WCC, where he was twice selected to the All-WCC First Team (2004, 2005). He also led the league in steals during the 2003–04 and 2004–05 seasons.

== Professional career ==
Perkins started his professional career in the 2005–06 season in the Japanese League, where he played for Toyota Alvark. He was named the MVP of the league, after leading his team to the championship. In the final game, Perkins had 19 points, 11 rebounds, and 6 assists.

Perkins then signed with the German League club EWE Baskets Oldenburg for the 2006–07 season. He averaged 12 points, 3.8 rebounds, and 4.1 assists in 27 minutes per game. In the 2007–08 season, Perkins led his team, Bree, to the Belgian League's final. He had an outstanding season. He finished the season averaging 15.8 points, 5.3 rebounds, 5.7 assists, and 3.1 steals in 31 minutes per game.

For the 2008–09 season, Perkins signed with the Israeli Super League club Maccabi Haifa. He averaged 17 points, 6.3 rebounds, 5.3 assists, and 3 steals in 31 minutes per game. He had his best game against Ashkelon, finishing the game with 27 points, 7 rebounds, 7 assists, 4 steals, and 2 blocks. He was rewarded for his efforts with the Super League's MVP award. Perkins was named the MVP of his league in two out of his first four pro seasons.

In August 2009, Perkins was invited to join the senior men's Russian national team. As citizenship was a prerequisite to joining the team, Perkins was offered Russian citizenship. He decided however not to take Russian citizenship.

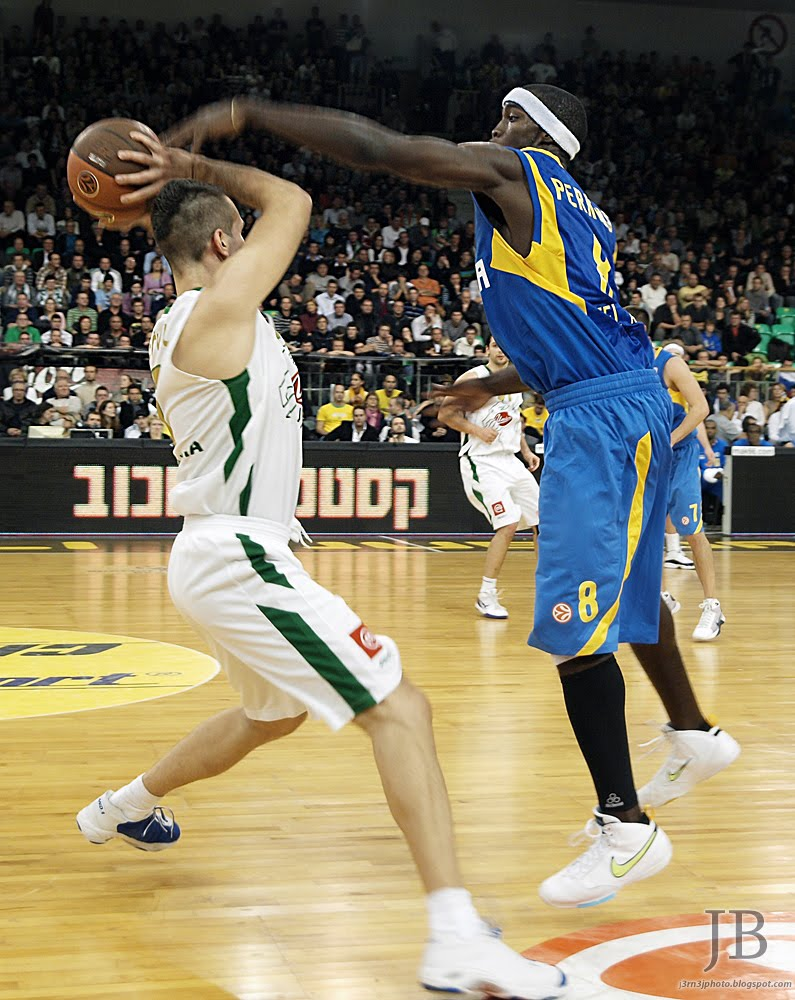
Perkins playing for Maccabi Tel Aviv

He then returned to the Israeli Super League, and signed with the league's defending champions Maccabi Tel Aviv. During the 2010–11 season, Perkins earned the nickname "who if not" ("מי אם לא"), due to his uncanny knack for coming up with loose balls, and for the way the Hebrew speaking game announcers constantly used the phrase, "who if not, Doron Perkins". He was the 2010 and 2011 Israeli Basketball Premier League Defensive Player of the Year.

On March 29, 2011, during game 3 of the EuroLeague playoff series between Maccabi Tel Aviv and Caja Laboral, for the ticket to the EuroLeague Final Four, Perkins suffered an injury to his right knee. A medical examination later showed that he suffered two tears in his Meniscus, in his ACL and MCL, and he subsequently underwent surgery to repair the damaged knee. A prognosis of nine months rehabilitation time was published in the media.

In early February 2012, Perkins returned to the court, after nearly one year off from basketball. He signed with the Italian League club Cantù, and played in his first EuroLeague game against Spanish League power Barcelona. Perkins finished the game with 12 points, 7 rebounds, 5 assists, and 2 steals. Perkins was also named the player of the week in his second week in the Italian League.

He then signed with the Ukrainian League club Donetsk. After playing in the Chinese Basketball Association with Foshan Long Lions, Perkins joined the Greek League club Olympiacos in February 2013. With Olympiacos, he won the 2012–13 season championship of the EuroLeague. He was released by Olympiacos in May 2013.

He signed a contract with Beşiktaş Integral Forex on September 30, 2013.

On September 6, 2014, Perkins signed a one-year contract with the Spanish team Laboral Kutxa Vitoria. On December 12, 2014, he parted ways with Laboral. On January 27, 2015, he signed with Krasny Oktyabr of Russia for the remainder of the season. However the next month he was released, before making his official debut for the team.

In August 2015, Perkins signed with Turkish club Yeşilgiresun Belediye for the 2015–16 BSL season.

On December 11, 2016, Perkins signed with Sanat Naft Abadan of the Iranian Super League.

On August 17, 2017, Perkins signed with Goyang Orions of the Korean Basketball League, replacing Dustin Hogue. On September 4, he was replaced by Dewarick Spencer.

== Coaching career ==
On October 24, 2023, Perkins was hired as an assistant coach by the Cleveland Charge of the NBA G League.

== Career statistics ==
Legend
GP	Games played	GS	Games started	MPG	Minutes per game
FG%	Field-goal percentage	3P%	3-point field-goal percentage	FT%	Free-throw percentage
RPG	Rebounds per game	APG	Assists per game	SPG	Steals per game
BPG	Blocks per game	PPG	Points per game	PIR	Performance index rating
**Bold**	Career high

=== EuroLeague ===
†	Denotes seasons in which Perkins won the EuroLeague

Year	Team	GP	GS	MPG	FG%	3P%	FT%	RPG	APG	SPG	BPG	PPG	PIR
2009–10	Maccabi	**20**	0	21.7	**.488**	.342	.649	5.0	3.4	1.2	.2	9.3	12.5
2010–11	Maccabi	19	**19**	**29.3**	.401	.254	.646	5.4	3.6	**1.7**	**.5**	9.5	13.4
2011–12	Cantù	2	0	25.5	.368	.286	.667	**7.5**	**5.5**	1.0	—	**10.0**	**17.5**
2012–13†	Olympiacos	5	0	5.4	.000	.000	**1.000**	.4	.4	.2	—	0.4	-1.4
2014–15	Baskonia	9	2	10.8	.348	**.357**	.625	2.3	1.0	.7	—	2.9	5.0
Career		55	21	21.2	.423	.289	.652	4.4	2.9	1.2	.3	7.5	10.5

== Awards and achievements ==
=== Santa Clara University ===
- 2x All-West Coast Conference First Team: (2004, 2005)
- West Coast Conference tournament All-Tournament Team: (2004)
- 2x West Coast Conference Steals Leader: (2004, 2005)

=== Toyota Alvark ===
- Japanese League Champion: (2006)
- Japanese League MVP: (2006)
- Japanese League Assists Leader: (2006)

=== Bree ===
- Belgian League Assists Leader: (2008)
- Belgian League Steals Leader: (2008)

=== Maccabi Haifa ===
- Israeli Super League MVP: (2009)
- Israeli Super League Steals Leader: (2009)

=== Maccabi Tel Aviv ===
- 2x Israeli Cup Winner: (2010, 2011)
- 2x Israeli Super League Defensive Player of The Year: (2010, 2011)
- Israeli Super League Champion: (2011)

=== Olympiacos ===
- EuroLeague Champion: (2013)
