= Chris Copeland =

American basketball player (born 1984)

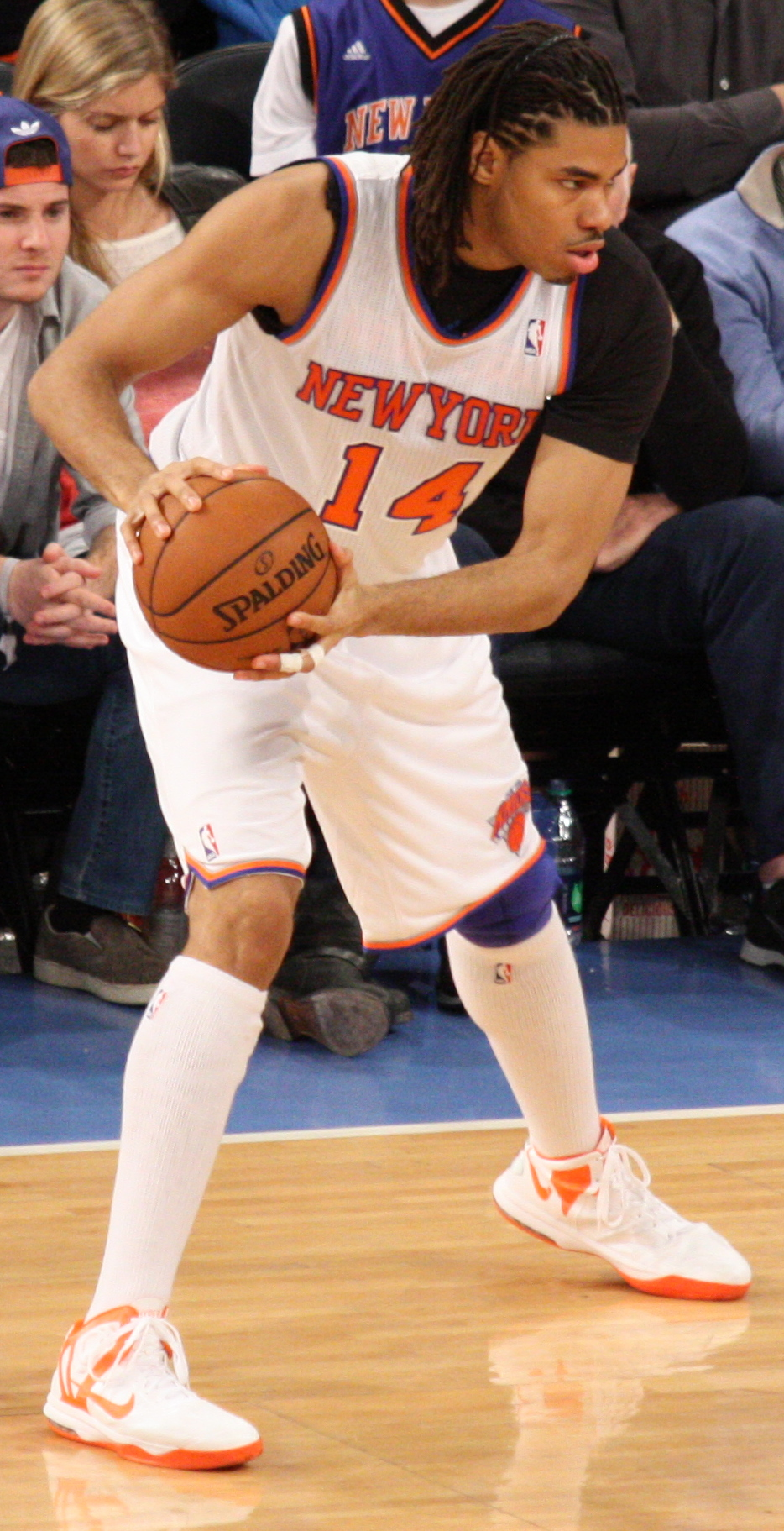
- Copeland with the New York Knicks in 2013

Personal information
- Born: March 17, 1984 (age 42) Orange, New Jersey, U.S.
- Listed height: 6 ft 8 in (2.03 m)
- Listed weight: 235 lb (107 kg)

Career information
- High school: Hermitage (Henrico, Virginia)
- College: Colorado (2002–2006)
- NBA draft: 2006: undrafted
- Playing career: 2006–2018
- Position: Small forward / power forward
- Number: 14, 22, 9

Career history

Playing
- 2006–2007: Fort Worth Flyers
- 2007: CB L'Hospitalet
- 2007–2008: Matrixx Magixx
- 2008–2010: TBB Trier
- 2010–2012: Okapi Aalstar
- 2012–2013: New York Knicks
- 2013–2015: Indiana Pacers
- 2015–2016: Milwaukee Bucks
- 2016–2017: Tofaş
- 2017–2018: Andorra

Coaching
- 2023–2024: Wisconsin Herd (assistant)

Career highlights
- German League Top Scorer (2010); Belgian Cup winner (2012); Belgian League MVP (2012); Belgian League Star of the Coaches (2012); Dutch League All-Star (2008)
- Stats at NBA.com
- Stats at Basketball Reference

Christopher Stephen Copeland (born March 17, 1984), nicknamed "the X-Factor", is an American former professional basketball player. He played college basketball for the Colorado Buffaloes.

== Early life ==
Copeland was born in Orange, New Jersey to mother, Terry, in 1984. With his father absent from his life from birth, Copeland always looked up to his older brother, Vincent Alphaquan, a basketball standout at Seton Hall Prep and Columbus High School in New York before he played at Jackson State. At age 4, he established a practice routine with Vincent as his coach, honing his game with various dribbling drills in a narrow alleyway next to their house. He continued with the regimen through childhood at Elmwood Park under Vincent's guidance. This all changed in May 1997 when Vincent slipped into a coma after a drunk driver struck him in a hit-and-run accident on Central Avenue in East Orange, just a few blocks away from the Copelands' house. He regained consciousness for a couple days, but six weeks after the accident, he unexpectedly died. Vincent, engaged to marry that June, was 22.

One weekend in August 1999, Copeland and his mother visited his aunt in Richmond, Virginia where she brought Copeland, then 15, to nearby Hermitage High School. He wandered into the gym where, by chance, the school's players were running pick-up games. He was already 6-foot-6, and he was immediately noticed. Upon their chance encounter with the coaches at Hermitage, Terry decided she and her son would leave New Jersey. She quit her job as a senior administrator for Unity Hospice in Newark, and by October 1999, her son was enrolled at Hermitage. As a senior in 2001–02, he averaged 15 points, 9.0 rebounds, 3.7 blocks per game for the Panthers as he earned Most Valuable Player honors, as well as Virginia High School Colonial District Co-Player of the Year, Virginia All-State honorable mention, all-region, all-district and all-metro first-team selection. As both a junior and senior, he helped Hermitage win the Colonial District Championship.

== College career ==
In his freshman season at Colorado, Copeland proved to be a valuable contributor off the bench as he often provided CU with clutch points despite limited minutes. In 26 games, he averaged 2.5 points and 1.6 rebounds in 7.7 minutes per game.

In his sophomore season, Copeland played in 27 of the Buffs 28 games while averaging 9.2 minutes per game. He scored a season-high 12 points against Iowa State on March 3, 2004, along with five rebounds and four-of-four from the free-throw line. For the season, he averaged 2.9 points and 2.5 rebounds per game.

In his junior season, Copeland earned Big 12 All-Improved team honors after more than tripling his points per game average. He scored a career-high 25 points against Richmond on January 4, 2005. In 29 games (15 starts), he averaged 11.7 points, 5.6 rebounds, 1.5 assists and 1.2 blocks in 25.2 minutes per game.

In his senior season, Copeland helped CU to a 20–10 overall record and an NIT berth as he played in all 30 games with 28 starts while averaging 24.3 minutes per game. He scored a season-high 22 points against Kansas on January 11, 2006. For the season, he averaged 12.1 points, 5.1 rebounds, 1.6 assists and 1.1 blocks per game.

=== College statistics ===
Year	Team	GP	GS	MPG	FG%	3P%	FT%	RPG	APG	SPG	BPG	PPG
2002–03	Colorado	26	0	7.7	.377	.250	.577	1.6	.3	.1	.3	2.5
2003–04	Colorado	28	0	9.2	.379	.393	.594	2.5	.5	.3	.5	2.9
2004–05	Colorado	29	15	25.2	.448	.375	.814	5.6	1.5	.3	1.2	11.7
2005–06	Colorado	30	28	24.3	.440	.357	.688	5.1	1.6	.8	1.1	12.1

== Professional career ==
=== Fort Worth Flyers (2006–2007) ===
Copeland went undrafted in the 2006 NBA draft. On March 29, 2007, he was acquired by the Fort Worth Flyers of the NBA Development League. He went on to play 20 games for the Flyers to close out the 2006–07 season.

=== CB L'Hospitalet (2007) ===
On September 20, 2007, Copeland signed with CB L'Hospitalet of Spain for the 2007–08 season.

=== Matrixx Magixx (2007–2008) ===
In October 2007, Copeland left L'Hospitalet and signed with Matrixx Magixx of the Netherlands for the rest of the 2007–08 season.

=== TBB Trier (2008–2010) ===
In the summer of 2008, Copeland signed with TBB Trier of Germany for the 2008–09 season. In June 2009, he re-signed with the Trier for the 2009–10 season. He played 67 games over two seasons as he averaged 13.2 ppg in 2008–09 and 16.9 ppg in 2009–10.

=== Okapi Aalstar (2010–2012) ===
In July 2010, Copeland signed with Okapi Aalstar of Belgium for the 2010–11 season. In April 2011, he signed a two-year contract extension with the club. However, he left Aalstar following the 2011–12 season after earning Belgian League MVP and Star of the Coaches honors.

=== New York Knicks (2012–2013) ===
On July 16, 2012, Copeland signed a one-year deal with the New York Knicks and went on to average 13.8 points in five games for the Knicks during the 2012 NBA Summer League. On November 2, 2012, he made his NBA debut in the Knicks' season opener against the Miami Heat, recording no points in just under two minutes of action.

On December 18, 2012, Copeland was assigned to the Erie BayHawks of the NBA Development League. He was recalled on December 19, reassigned on December 20 and recalled again on December 21; he did not appear in a game for Erie during his time with them.

On April 17, 2013, Copeland recorded a career-high 33 points in the Knicks' final regular season game against the Atlanta Hawks. He subsequently won the Eastern Conference Rookie of the Month for the month of April. In 2012–13, Copeland averaged 8.7 points per game, and despite not being named to an NBA All-Rookie Team, he still managed to tie Harrison Barnes at sixth place in the NBA Rookie of the Year voting (with eight points each).

On June 25, 2013, the Knicks extended a qualifying offer to make Copeland a restricted free agent.

=== Indiana Pacers (2013–2015) ===
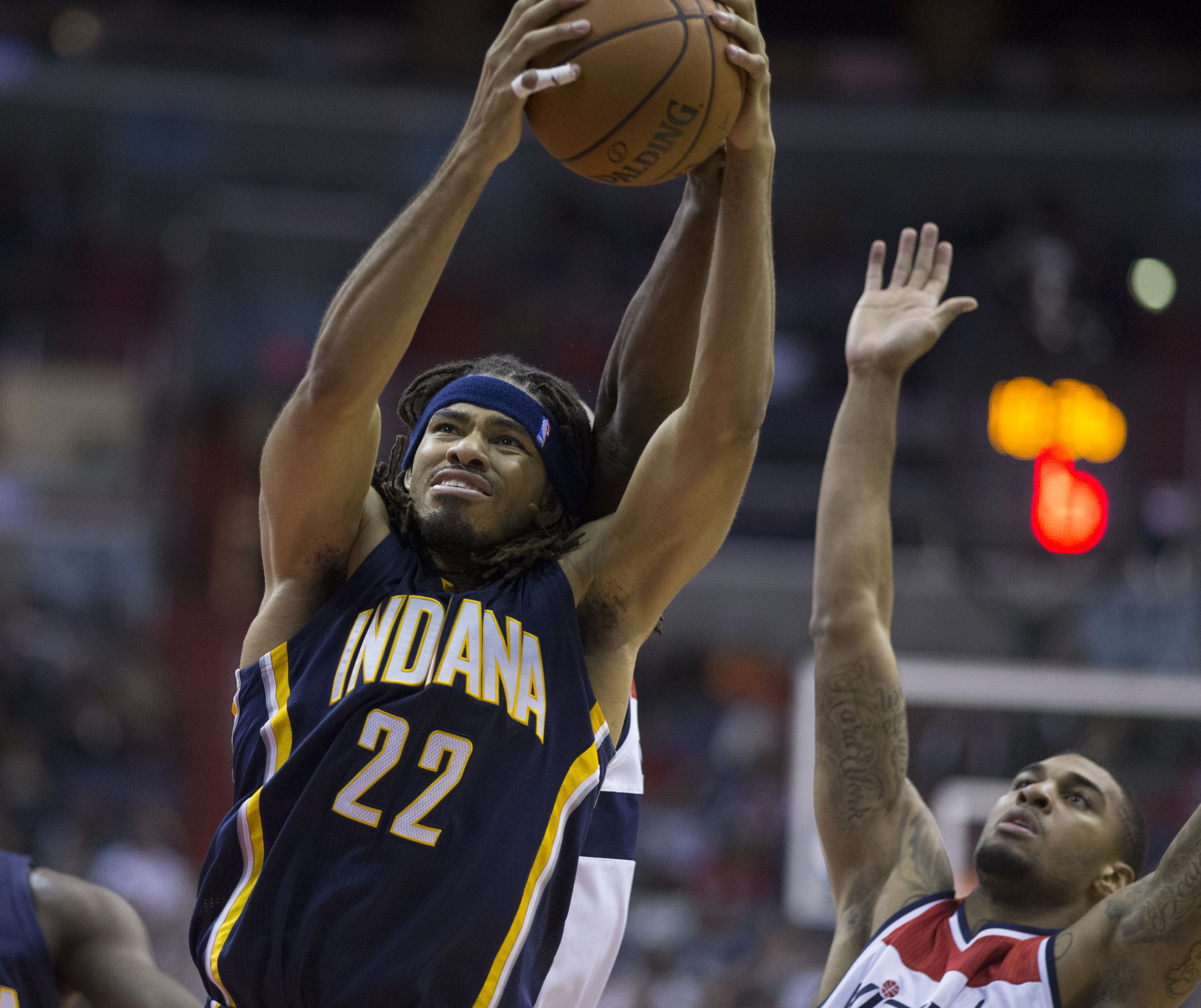
Copeland with the Pacers in November 2014

On July 10, 2013, Copeland received a two-year, $6.1 million offer sheet from the Indiana Pacers. The Knicks declined to match the offer, and Copeland signed with the Pacers on July 14. After a promising rookie season with the Knicks, Copeland's production dropped off dramatically with the Pacers in 2013–14 as he averaged just 3.7 points and 6.5 minutes in 41 games, playing behind Paul George, Danny Granger and Evan Turner.

On November 5, 2014, Copeland recorded 19 points and a career-high 12 rebounds in a 94–96 overtime loss to the Washington Wizards.

=== Milwaukee Bucks (2015–2016) ===
On July 29, 2015, Copeland signed with the Milwaukee Bucks. He made his debut for the Bucks in the team's season opener against the New York Knicks on October 28, recording 8 points and 2 rebounds in a 122–97 loss. On February 22, 2016, he was waived by the Bucks. Two days later, the Orlando Magic put in a waiver claim on Copeland in order to waive him, so as to go above the season's minimum team salary of $63 million.

On September 22, 2016, Copeland signed with the New Orleans Pelicans, but was waived on October 3.

After being waived by the Pelicans before playing a game for them, Copeland would never play in the NBA again and completed his professional basketball career overseas. His final NBA game was played on February 2, 2016, in a 95 - 107 loss to the Portland Trail Blazers where he played for nearly 3 minutes and only recorded 1 foul as a stat.

=== Tofaş (2016–2017) ===
On December 5, 2016, Copeland signed with Turkish club Tofaş for the rest of the 2016–17 BSL season. He averaged 9 points, 3.3 rebounds and 1.7 assists per game in 21 games of the 2016–17 BSL season, helping his club reach the playoffs.

=== Andorra (2017–2018) ===
On November 3, 2017, Copeland signed with Andorra. He joined the club with an agreement until February 2018, in order to replace injured Georgian forward Beka Burjanadze. On January 29, 2018, he parted ways with Andorra after appearing in six games.

== Coaching career ==
On October 5, 2023, Copeland was hired as an assistant coach by the Wisconsin Herd of the NBA G League.

== NBA career statistics ==
Legend
GP	Games played	GS	Games started	MPG	Minutes per game
FG%	Field goal percentage	3P%	3-point field goal percentage	FT%	Free throw percentage
RPG	Rebounds per game	APG	Assists per game	SPG	Steals per game
BPG	Blocks per game	PPG	Points per game	**Bold**	Career high

=== Regular season ===
Year	Team	GP	GS	MPG	FG%	3P%	FT%	RPG	APG	SPG	BPG	PPG
2012–13	New York	**56**	**13**	15.4	**.479**	**.421**	.759	2.1	.5	**.3**	**.2**	**8.7**
2013–14	Indiana	41	0	6.5	.470	.418	.714	.8	.4	.1	**.2**	3.7
2014–15	Indiana	50	12	**16.6**	.361	.311	.733	**2.2**	**1.0**	.2	**.2**	6.2
2015–16	Milwaukee	24	1	6.5	.333	.278	**.857**	.4	.5	.1	.0	2.1
Career		171	26	12.3	.427	.365	.752	1.6	.6	.2	.2	5.8

=== Playoffs ===
Year	Team	GP	GS	MPG	FG%	3P%	FT%	RPG	APG	SPG	BPG	PPG
2013	New York	9	**1**	**10.3**	.400	**.478**	**1.000**	**1.0**	**.1**	**.6**	.0	**4.1**
2014	Indiana	**12**	0	6.8	**.429**	.375	.667	.4	**.1**	.3	**.3**	3.0
Career		21	1	8.3	.414	.436	.727	.7	.1	.4	.1	3.5

== Personal life ==
On April 8, 2015, Copeland was stabbed in the abdomen outside of a nightclub in New York City. His ex-girlfriend, Katrine, was also slashed in her arm and leg. Pero Antić and Thabo Sefolosha of the Atlanta Hawks were arrested at the scene for allegedly interfering with police; the charges against Antic were later dropped, while Sefolosha refused a plea deal in favor of going to trial and was found not guilty, later suing the police for damages, including a broken tibia which had benched him for the remainder of that NBA season. Copeland was taken to Bellevue Hospital, where he was listed in stable condition.
