= Pro Basketball League MVP =

The Pro Basketball League MVP is an annual award of the Pro Basketball League (PBL), the highest tier professional basketball league in Belgium, given since the 2000–01 season, to the league's most valuable player in the regular season.

== Winners ==
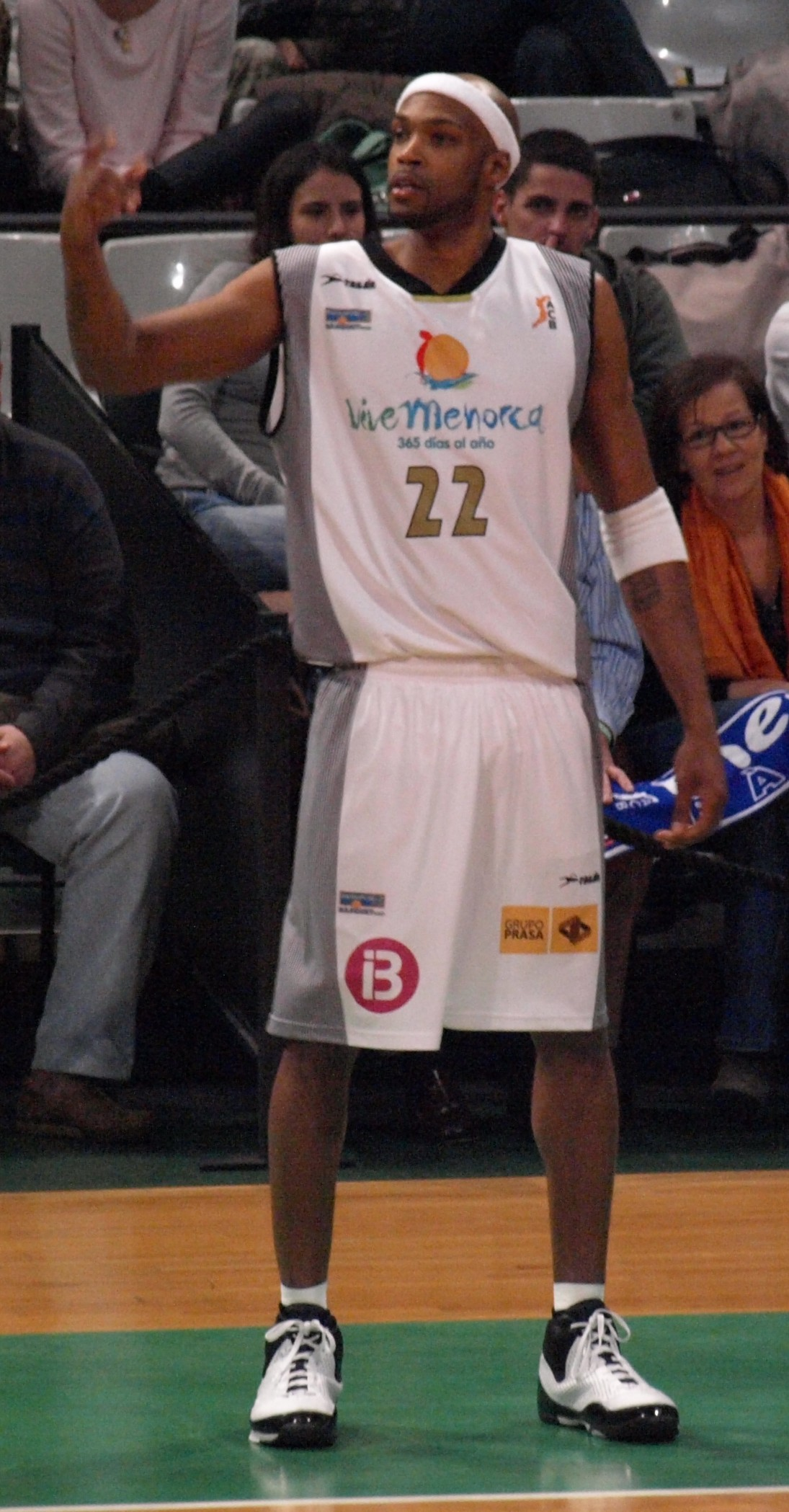
Marcus Faison won the MVP award two times, in 2003 and 2005

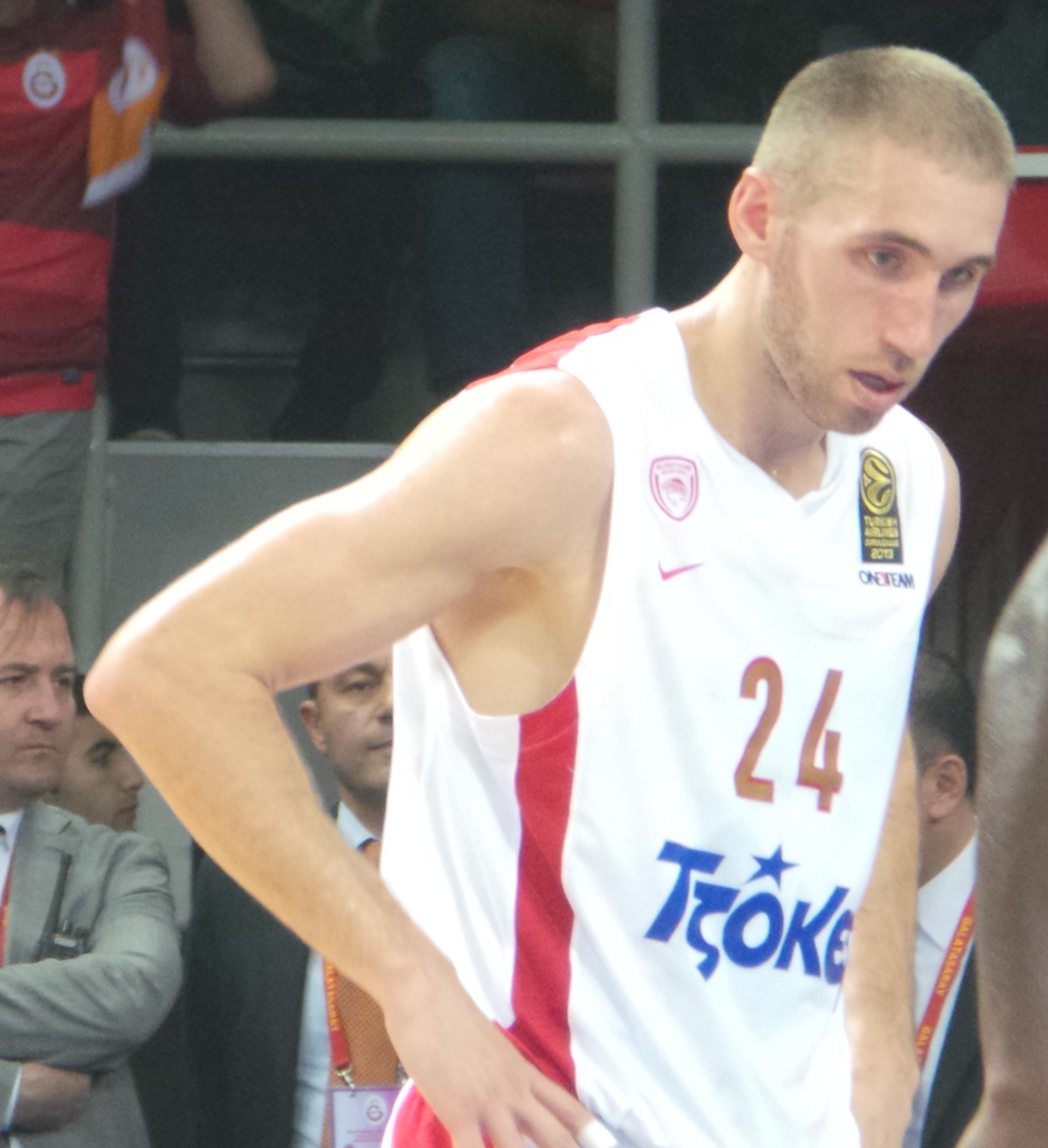
Matt Lojeski won the award in 2009 and 2013

^	Denotes player who is still active in the BLB Division I
*	Inducted into the Naismith Memorial Basketball Hall of Fame
†	Denotes player whose team won championship that year
Player (X)	Denotes the number of times the player had been named MVP at that time

Season	Player	Position	Nationality	Team	Ref(s)
2000–01†	Virginijus Praškevičius	Forward	Lithuania	Telindus Oostende	
2001–02†	Ralph Biggs	Forward	United States	Telindus Oostende	
2002–03†	Marcus Faison	Guard	United States	Spirou Charleroi	
2003–04†	Andre Riddick	Center	United States	Spirou Charleroi	
2004–05	Marcus Faison (2)	Guard	United States	Spirou Charleroi	
2005–06	George Evans	Forward	United States	Dexia Mons-Hainaut	
2006–07	Len Matela	Center	United States	Sanex Antwerp Giants	
2007–08	D'or Fischer	Center	United States	Euphony Bree	
2008–09	Matt Lojeski	Forward	United States (Note: Matt Lojeski was still an American)	Okapi Aalstar	
2009–10	Will Thomas	Forward	United States	Liège	
2010–11†	Demond Mallet	Guard	United States	Spirou Charleroi	
2011–12	Christopher Copeland	Forward	United States	Okapi Aalstar	
2012–13†	Matt Lojeski (2)	Forward	United States (Note: Matt Lojeski received the Belgian nationality in May 2013. During his 2012–13 season, he played as an American player.)	Telenet Oostende	
2013–14†	Dušan Đorđević^	Guard	Serbia	Telenet Oostende	
2014–15†	Dušan Đorđević (2)^	Guard	Serbia	Telenet Oostende	
2015–16	John Tofi	Center	United States	Okapi Aalstar	
2016–17	Jason Clark	Guard	United States	Antwerp Giants	
2017–18†	Jean Salumu	Guard	Belgium	Oostende	
2018–19	Paris Lee	Guard	United States	Telenet Giants Antwerp	
2019–20	Hugh Robertson	Guard	United States	Leuven Bears	
2020–21	Vladimir Mihailović	Guard	Montenegro	Okapi Aalst	
