= John Tofi =

American-Samoan basketball player

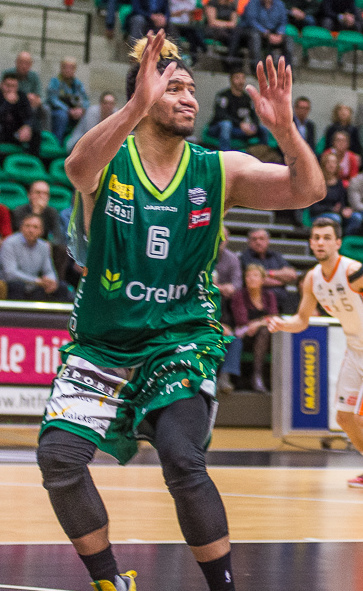
- Tofi playing with Okapi in 2017

Personal information
- Born: June 1, 1984 (age 42) San Francisco, California
- Listed height: 6 ft 9 in (2.06 m)
- Listed weight: 250 lb (113 kg)

Career information
- High school: Archbishop Riordan (San Francisco, California)
- College: UTEP (2002–2006)
- NBA draft: 2006: undrafted
- Playing career: 2010–2018
- Position: Center
- Number: 6

Career history
- 2010–2012: Leuven Bears
- 2012–2018: Okapi Aalstar

Career highlights
- Belgian League MVP (2016); Belgian Cup champion (2012); 2x Belgian Supercup champion (2012–2013)

Ioana Pulo Tofi (born June 1, 1984) is an American-Samoan retired basketball player. He played as center. After playing college basketball with UTEP, he played professionally in Belgium for Leuven Bears and Okapi Aalstar.

== Professional career ==
On May 6, 2016, Tofi was named the Basketball League Belgium Division I MVP, after averaging 15.9 points and 6.9 rebounds in 27.8 minutes over the season. Tofi led Okapi Aalstar to the Finals afterwards, but there the team lost to Telenet Oostende.
