= Miloš Bojović =

Serbian basketball player

Personal information
- Born: December 2, 1981 (age 44) Belgrade, SFR Yugoslavia
- Listed height: 1.98 m (6 ft 6 in)
- Listed weight: 88 kg (194 lb)

Career information
- NBA draft: 2003: undrafted
- Playing career: 1999–present
- Position: Guard

Career history
- 1999–2004: Avala Ada
- 2004–2006: Atlas
- 2006–2007: Sloga Kraljevo
- 2007–2008: Vojvodina Srbijagas
- 2008–2009: Budućnost
- 2009–2010: Politekhnika-Halychyna
- 2010–2011: Olympique Antibes
- 2011: Železničar Inđija
- 2012: PAOK
- 2012–2013: Radnički FMP
- 2013–2015: CSU Sibiu
- 2015–2017: Phoenix Galați
- 2017–2021: Liège
- 2021–2022: Limburg United

Career highlights
- Serbian League Top Scorer (2012); Belgian Cup winner (2022); 2× Belgian League scoring champion (2018, 2019); Belgian League steals leader (2018); Serbian First League MVP (2007); Montenegrin League champion (2009); Montenegrin Cup winner (2009)

Miloš Bojović (born December 2, 1981) is a Serbian professional basketball player. He is a 1.98 tall guard who currently plays for Limburg United of the Pro Basketball League. In 2018 and 2019, he was the Belgian PBL scoring champion.
