= RBC Pepinster =

- Leagues: Belgian First Division
- Founded: 1938; 88 years ago
- History: R.B.C. Verviers-Pepinster (1938–2013); Wolves Verviers-Pepinster (2013–2016); RBC Pepinster (2016–present)
- Arena: Halle du Paire
- Capacity: 4,000
- Location: Pepinster, Belgium
- Team colors: Blue, White
- Championships: 1 Belgian Cup; 1 Belgian Supercup
- Website: rbcpepinster.be
Home	Away

Royal Basketball Club Pepinster is a Belgian basketball club that is located in the Verviers-Pepinster area of Liège Province, Belgium. The club currently competes in the Belgian Fifth Division, the fifth tier of Belgian basketball. Before, the team used to be a regular participant of the Basketball League Belgium. The team club plays its home games at the 4,000 seat Hall du Paire.

== History ==
Verviers-Pepinster was the runner-up of the Belgian League twice: in 2003 and 2014. The club also won the Belgian Cup in 1980, and the Belgian Supercup in 2003.

On 29 June 2016, it was announced that the club would leave the Belgian League, due to a lack of budget.

== Honors and titles ==
- Belgian Cup
  - Winners (1): 1979–80
- Belgian Supercup
  - Winners (1): 2003

== Season by season ==
Season	Tier	League	Pos.	Belgian Cup	European competitions
2011–12	1	Belgian League	9th		
2012–13	1	Belgian League	8th	Semifinalist	
2013–14	1	Belgian League	9th	Round of 16	
2014–15	1	Belgian League	8th	Round of 16	
2015–16	1	Belgian League	10th	Round of 16	

== Notable players ==
Note: Flags indicate national team eligibility at FIBA-sanctioned events. Players may hold other non-FIBA nationalities not displayed.

Criteria

To appear in this section a player must have either:

- Set a club record or won an individual award while at the club
- Played at least one official international match for their national team at any time
- Played at least one official NBA match at any time.

- (Belgium) Axel Hervelle
- (Georgia (country)) Tornike Shengelia
- (Belgium) Maxime De Zeeuw
- (Nigeria) Jamal Olasewere
- (United States) Arizona Reid
- (United States) Charles Lee

== Head coaches ==
Coach	Period
(Croatia) Ivica Skelin	2006–2008
(Belgium) Jurgen Van Meerbeeck	2008–2010
(Croatia) Ivica Skelin	2010
(United States) Aaron McCarthy	2010–2012
(Serbia) Nenad Trajković	2012–2013
(Belgium) Julien Marnegrave	2013–2014
(Belgium) Thibaut Petit	2014–2015
(Belgium) Jérôme Jacquemin	2015–2016
(Serbia) Aleksandar Zečević	2016–2017
(Belgium) Pascal Mossay	2017–

== Sponsorship names ==
Due to sponsorship reasons, the club has been known as:

- Go Pass Verviers-Pepinster (1995–1996)
- VOO Verviers-Pepinster (2007–2013)
- VOO Wolves Verviers-Pepinster (2013–2015)

== Logos ==
The logo of the VOO Wolves (2013–2015)
