= Liège Basket =

- Leagues: BNXT League
- Founded: 1967; 58 years ago
- Dissolved: 2024
- History: Fléron Basket Club; 1967–2000; Liège Basket; 2000–2024
- Arena: Country Hall Liège
- Capacity: 5,000
- Location: Liège, Belgium
- Team colors: Black, White, Red
- Main sponsor: VOO
- President: Ernie Cambo
- Head coach: Alex Zampier
- Ownership: Ernie Cambo
- Championships: 1 Belgian Cup; 2 Belgian Supercups
- Website: liegebasket.be
Home	Away

Liège Basket was a Belgian professional basketball club from Liège. The club competed in the BNXT League. Founded in 1967, the team played at 5,600 seat Country Hall Ethias Liège.

The club was one of the traditional clubs in Belgian basketball, having played in the top flight division since 2001 for a period of 24 years. Liège Basket's accolades include one Belgian Cup (in 2004) and two Belgian Supercups (in 2004 and 2009). The team was disestablished in 2024 after its main investor left the team, leaving insufficient funds to continue the club.

== History ==
The club was founded in Fléron as the Fléron Basket Club in 1967. After being an amateur league for its first years, the team hired its first professional coach in 1975. In 1977 and 1981, the Fléron promoted to the first regional league. In 1983, the club made its debut on the national level as it promoted to the Fourth National Division. In 2000, the club decided to merge with BC Hannut and Essor Hannut, relocating to the city of Liège.

After the move to Lìege, the club quickly promoted to the First National League. In 2001, the club's debut in Europe was made after it qualified as 7th in the previous season. In the 2001–02 FIBA Korać Cup, the team lost to French side Racing Paris in the first round. Three years later, in 2004, the team wins its first silverware when it captures the Belgian Basketball Cup for the first time.

In the 2008–09 season, the team had its best European campaign when it reached the Top 16 of the 2008–09 FIBA EuroChallenge. In 2010, Liège played in the championship playoffs for the first time, but loses to Spirou Charleroi.

Since the 2021–22 season, Liège plays in the BNXT League, in which the national leagues of Belgium and the Netherlands have been merged. After the 2020s were characterised mainly by financial problems for Liège, the club was purchased by an American investors group in 2022. The Mickael Sports Group, owned by Ernie Cambo, purchased all shares in the team. Following the acquisition, head coach Lionel Bosco was sacked and replaced by Brad Greenberg.

On October 3, the club announced that they will be boycotting the away-game against Antwerp Giants on October 28 because of "partisan" refereeing in away-games, also saying that "Belgian players get better calls then foreigners. The BNXT League responded by saying that if they actually pull through, Liège will be refused access to the playoffs on top of a €2500 fine. The League put the deadline for the decision on October 10. On October 9, they announced that the will play against the Antwerp Giants.

Following the 2023–24 season, owner Ernie Cambo announced the stop of funding of the basketball team, citing the lack of support from the municapility. He added that the slow support from sponsors, as well as the upcoming reconstruction of the Country Hall led to the decision. As a result, the team was later disestablished, ending a 58-year history of the club.

== Honours and titles ==
- Belgian Cup
  - Winners (1): 2003–04
- Belgian Supercup
  - Winners (2): 2004, 2009
- European North League
  - Third (1): 2024

== Logos and names ==
Sponsored logo (2014–2017)

The Liège Basket logo used until 2018
- TEC Liège (2000–2001)
- Dexia Liège (2001)
- Euphony Liège (2001–2004)
- Liège Basket (2004–2015)
- betFirst Liège Basket (2015–2017)
- VOO Liège Basket (2017–present)

== Season by season ==
Season	Tier	League	Pos.	Belgian Cup	Other cups		European competitions	
2009–10	1	BLB	2nd		Supercup	C	3 EuroChallenge	T16
2010–11	1	BLB	8th				3 EuroChallenge	RS
2011–12	1	BLB	8th					
2012–13	1	BLB	7th	Quarterfinalist				
2013–14	1	BLB	5th	Semifinalist				
2014–15	1	BLB	7th	Runner-up				
2015–16	1	BLB	8th	Round of 16				
2016–17	1	BLB	10th	Round of 16				
2017–18	1	BLB	9th	Quarterfinalist				
2018–19	1	BLB	10th	Round of 16				
2019–20	1	PBL	10th					
2020–21	1	PBL	9th	Play-in Round				
2021–22	1	BNXT	17th	–				

== European record ==
Season	Tier	Competition	Round	Club	Home	Away
2001–02	2	FIBA Korać Cup	First Round	(France) Racing Paris	62–83	74–88
2004–05	2	ULEB Cup				
2006–07	3	FIBA EuroCup	First Round	(Estonia) BC Kalev	?	?
2006–07	3	FIBA EuroCup	First Round	(Ukraine) BC Kyiv	?	?
2006–07	3	FIBA EuroCup	Second Round	(Spain) Estudiantes	?	?
2006–07	3	FIBA EuroCup	Second Round	(Cyprus) AEL Limassol	?	?
2006–07	3	FIBA EuroCup	Second Round	(Lithuania) Šiauliai	?	?
2008–09	3	FIBA EuroChallenge	First Qualifying Round	(Denmark) Bakken Bears	97–64	67–55
2008–09	3	FIBA EuroChallenge	Second Qualifying Round	(France) JA Vichy	74–67	80-70
2008–09	3	FIBA EuroChallenge	Regular Season	(Spain) Cajasol	69–62	79–78
2008–09	3	FIBA EuroChallenge	Regular Season	(Latvia) Ventspils	89–84	73–54
2008–09	3	FIBA EuroChallenge	Regular Season	(Poland) Czarni Słupsk	89–64	93–91
2008–09	3	FIBA EuroChallenge	Top 16	(Netherlands) EiffelTowers Den Bosch	81–68	58–67
2008–09	3	FIBA EuroChallenge	Top 16	(Germany) Bonn	59–67	64–79
2008–09	3	FIBA EuroChallenge	Top 16	(France) Cholet	70–80	78–71
2009–10	3	FIBA EuroChallenge				

== Players ==
=== Individual awards ===
Belgian League MVP

- Will Thomas: 2010

Belgian League Star of the Coaches

- Will Thomas: 2010

=== Notable players ===
Note: Flags indicate national team eligibility at FIBA-sanctioned events. Players may hold other non-FIBA nationalities not displayed.

Criteria

To appear in this section a player must have either:

- Set a club record or won an individual award while at the club
- Played at least one official international match for their national team at any time
- Played at least one official NBA match at any time.

- (Belgium) Lionel Bosco
- (Cameroon) Stéphane Pelle
- (Latvia) Kristaps Janičenoks
- (Latvia) Armands Šķēle
- (Serbia) Miloš Bojović
- (United States) Ralph Biggs
- (United States) Andre Emmett
- (United States) Charles Smith
- (United States) Will Thomas
