= Belgium men's national basketball team =

Men's national basketball team representing Belgium

Belgium
- FIBA ranking: 36 ▼1 (1 September 2026)
- Joined FIBA: 1933
- FIBA zone: FIBA Europe
- National federation: Basketball Belgium
- Coach: Lionel Bosco (Interim)
- Nickname: Lions

Olympic Games
- Appearances: 3
- Medals: None

FIBA World Cup
- Appearances: None

EuroBasket
- Appearances: 19
- Medals: None
Home	Away

First international
- Belgium 17–31 France (Brussels, Belgium; 6 May 1928)

Biggest win
- Belgium 114–11 Albania (Prague, Czechoslovakia; 28 April 1947)

Biggest defeat
- Italy 91–50 Belgium (Sofia, Bulgaria; 23 June 1957)

The Belgium men's national basketball team (Note: French: Équipe nationale Belge de basketball Dutch: Belgisch nationaal basketbalteam German: Belgische Basketballnationalmannschaft) has represented Belgium in international basketball since 1928. The supervising body for the national team is Basketball Belgium.

Belgium has qualified for the EuroBasket 19 times throughout their history, achieving their best result at the event in 1947, where they finished in fourth place. Moreover, Belgium has competed at the Olympic Games on three occasions, in 1936, 1948, and 1952. However, Belgium is still in pursuit of making their first appearance at the FIBA World Cup.

The team is nicknamed and also represents itself as Belgian Lions.

== History ==
=== 1920s–1950s ===
Belgium played in their first official match on 6 May 1928, a 17–31 loss against France in Brussels. Belgium became a member of FIBA in 1933. In 1935, Belgium participated in the first European Basketball Championship. In their first game of the tournament, Belgium was defeated by Spain 25–17. Following the loss, Belgium was unable to advance into the semi-finals, and completed the rest of the competition in the classification round.

At the 1936 Olympic Games, Belgium was quickly eliminated, after posting an (0–2) record during their tournament stint. Ten years later, Belgium reappeared on the international stage at EuroBasket 1946. Entering the competition, the national team lost their only two games of the preliminary round, which sent them into the classification phase. There, Belgium earned a victory against Poland 22–39. The team would pick up one more victory, over Luxembourg, to finish the event in seventh place. A year later, Belgium was back on the continental level for EuroBasket 1947. After dropping their first game of the tournament to Egypt, the national team turned around to heavily defeat Albania 114–11. In their final match of the preliminary round, Belgium won again, this time against Italy to advance. Belgium opened up the second group phase of the competition with a win over France 26–27. However, the team would go (2–2) for the rest of the event, including the classification round, for a fourth place finish. At the 1948 Olympic Games, Belgium failed to advance past the preliminary phase, and was once again relegated to the classification round to complete the event.

In 1950, Belgium participated in a European qualifying tournament for the inaugural FIBA World Cup. Ultimately, the team missed out on the competition, after narrow losses to Spain and Yugoslavia. The following year, Belgium entered the EuroBasket 1951, where the team went undefeated in the preliminary round at (3–0). However, the team would endure a complete reversal of their results in the quarter-final round, losing all three of their matches and being sent into the classification phase to finish out the tournament.

At the 1952 Olympic Games, Belgium made their third appearance in the competition, losing two out of their three matches, and failing to make it past the tournament's first round. Heading to EuroBasket 1953, the struggles for Belgium on the international stage continued, as the national team posted a (1–2) record in the preliminary round and was sent into the classification phase to closeout the event.

After a disappointing tournament for Belgium, the team declined to enter the competition in 1955, and instead entered the event in 1957. However, Belgium would once again compile subpar preliminary phase results at (0–3), and relegated to the classification round. Belgium would lose their first two matches of the phase, before earning their first win of the competition against Austria 58–70. Following the victory, Belgium prevailed in three out of their next four games, including a 90–48 win over Albania in their final game of the tournament. That was where national team guard Eddy Terrace scored (63 points), which set a single game EuroBasket record to that point. Two years later, Belgium made their seventh appearance in the competition for EuroBasket 1959, where they garnered a (2–1) record in the preliminary stage to qualify for the semi-final round. Although after losing two of the three games in the round, Belgium's chances for a medal finish were gone.

=== 1960s–1990s ===
Heading into the 1960s, Belgium's first competition of the decade came at the EuroBasket 1961. After finishing second in their preliminary round group, the team advanced into the second group phase. However, even after winning three out of their four games in the round, Belgium was eliminated from medal contention. Two years later, at the EuroBasket 1963, Belgium won their opening match of the competition against Turkey 71–52. Although they would only manage to split their next six games in the round (3–3), and sent into the classification bracket to finish the tournament. In the ensuing years for Belgium, frustration continued to mount, as they would only qualify for the Euros once (1967), over the next fourteen years.

At EuroBasket 1977, Belgium hosted the event for the first time, and won their opening game 107–98 against Finland. However, the national team would lose three of their next four games in the preliminary round, and once again have to finish the competition in the classification stage. Two years later, Belgium's disastrous performance at the EuroBasket in 1979, culminated with the team going winless (0–7); and completing the tournament in last place. Following the event, Belgium failed to qualify for every major international competition during the 1980s. Fourteen years after competing in their last EuroBasket, Belgium qualified for the tournament in 1993. In Belgium's first game of the event, the national team defeated Slovenia 61–82. Ultimately, the victory for Belgium turned out to be their only one of the tournament, as they lost their next five games before being eliminated.

=== 2000s–2010s ===
After the turn of the century, the arrival of Belgium at the EuroBasket in 2011, marked the first time the national team qualified for the continental stage in 18 years. However, they would endure a disappointing tournament, losing all five of their preliminary round matches to be eliminated. Two years later, the team made it back to the competition for EuroBasket 2013. Following a 57–58 loss to Ukraine in their first game of the tournament, Belgium displayed resilience in their second game, in a 73–77 overtime victory against Germany. Belgium went on to finish the preliminary phase with a (2–3) record, to advance into the second round. There, the team lost two of their three games before exiting the event. Belgium qualified for EuroBasket 2015, after finishing (5–1) during qualifying. Entering the finals, Belgium split their first two games of the competition, before earning a buzzer-beating win over Lithuania 74–76. Belgium would finish the group stage with a (3–2) record to advance. Although in the Round of 16, Belgium would be eliminated by Greece 75–54.

To reach EuroBasket 2017, Belgium once again went (5–1) during their qualifying campaign to make the finals. However, Belgium failed to sustain the momentum achieved during their qualification period, and were eliminated after a (1–4) record in the group stage. The struggles for Belgium would continue during European Qualifiers for the 2019 FIBA World Cup, as the team was ousted from the qualifiers following a (1–5) record.

=== 2020s–present ===
Belgium entered Pre-Qualifiers for the EuroBasket 2022, where the national team went undefeated at (4–0), to move closer to clinching qualification. In the Qualifiers, Belgium completely dominated Lithuania at home in their first game 86–65. Following the victory, Belgium would go on to finish top of their qualifying group, to reach their fifth consecutive Euro finals. Drawn into Group A at the tournament, Belgium split their first two games of the event, prior to their impressive 83–73 win against the eventual champions Spain. Although after making it through the group stage, Belgium was eliminated in the Round of 16 to Slovenia 88–72.

Following the tournament, Belgium went through European Qualifiers for the 2023 FIBA World Cup, where they finished their campaign with a (6–6) record, and failing to qualify. In February 2024, after Belgium defeated Slovakia 60–75 in their first match of the EuroBasket 2025 qualifiers, they took down the EuroBasket 2022 champions Spain, 58–53, to move to (2–0). Belgium went on to eventually qualify for the finals with a (3–3) record, to make their 19th appearance at the competition. However, after being drawn into Group D at the event, Belgium lost three of their first four games, before winning their final group stage match against co-hosts Poland 69–70, to be eliminated.

== Competitive record ==
=== FIBA World Cup ===
World Cup					Qualification		
Year	Position	Pld	W	L	Pld	W	L
(Argentina) 1950	Did not qualify				5	3	2
(Brazil) 1954	Did not qualify				EuroBasket served as qualifiers		
(Chile) 1959	Did not qualify				EuroBasket served as qualifiers		
(Brazil) 1963	Did not qualify				EuroBasket served as qualifiers		
(Uruguay) 1967	Did not qualify				EuroBasket served as qualifiers		
(Socialist Federal Republic of Yugoslavia) 1970	Did not qualify				EuroBasket served as qualifiers		
(Puerto Rico) 1974	Did not qualify				EuroBasket served as qualifiers		
(Philippines) 1978	Did not qualify				EuroBasket served as qualifiers		
(Colombia) 1982	Did not qualify				EuroBasket served as qualifiers		
(Spain) 1986	Did not qualify				6	1	5
(Argentina) 1990	Did not qualify				EuroBasket served as qualifiers		
(Canada) 1994	Did not qualify				EuroBasket served as qualifiers		
(Greece) 1998	Did not qualify				EuroBasket served as qualifiers		
(United States) 2002	Did not qualify				EuroBasket served as qualifiers		
(Japan) 2006	Did not qualify				EuroBasket served as qualifiers		
(Turkey) 2010	Did not qualify				EuroBasket served as qualifiers		
(Spain) 2014	Did not qualify				EuroBasket served as qualifiers		
(China) 2019	Did not qualify				6	1	5
(Philippines) (Japan) (Indonesia) 2023	Did not qualify				12	6	6
(Qatar) 2027	Did not qualify				6	0	6
(France) 2031	To be determined				To be determined		
Total	0/20				35	11	24

=== Olympic Games ===
Olympic Games					Qualifying		
Year	Position	Pld	W	L	Pld	W	L
(Nazi Germany) 1936	19th	2	0	2			
(United Kingdom) 1948	11th	8	5	3			
(Finland) 1952	17th	3	1	2			
(Australia) 1956	Did not enter						
(Italy) 1960	Did not qualify				6	4	2
(Japan) 1964	Did not qualify				8	5	3
(Mexico) 1968	Did not enter				Did not enter		
(West Germany) 1972	Did not qualify				3	1	2
(Canada) 1976	Did not qualify				5	3	2
(Soviet Union) 1980	Did not enter				Did not enter		
(United States) 1984	Did not qualify				3	1	2
(South Korea) 1988	Did not enter				Did not enter		
(Spain) 1992	Did not enter				Did not enter		
(United States) 1996	Did not qualify				Did not qualify		
(Australia) 2000	Did not qualify				Did not qualify		
(Greece) 2004	Did not qualify				Did not qualify		
(China) 2008	Did not qualify				Did not qualify		
(United Kingdom) 2012	Did not qualify				Did not qualify		
(Brazil) 2016	Did not qualify				Did not qualify		
(Japan) 2020	Did not qualify				Did not qualify		
(France) 2024	Did not qualify				3	0	3
(United States) 2028	To be determined				To be determined		
Total	3/21	13	6	7	28	14	14

=== EuroBasket ===
EuroBasket					Qualification		
Year	Position	Pld	W	L	Pld	W	L
(Switzerland) 1935	6th	3	1	2			
(Latvia) 1937	Did not enter						
(Lithuania) 1939	Did not enter						
(Switzerland) 1946	7th	4	2	2			
(Czechoslovakia) 1947	4th	7	4	3			
(Egypt) 1949	Did not enter						
(France) 1951	7th	8	4	4			
(Soviet Union) 1953	10th	9	5	4			
(Hungary) 1955	Did not enter						
(Bulgaria) 1957	12th	10	4	6			
(Turkey) 1959	7th	8	3	5			
(Socialist Federal Republic of Yugoslavia) 1961	8th	8	4	4			
(Poland) 1963	8th	9	4	5	Directly qualified		
(Soviet Union) 1965	Did not qualify				3	1	2
(Finland) 1967	15th	9	2	7	3	3	0
(Italy) 1969	Did not qualify				5	2	3
(West Germany) 1971	Did not qualify				4	2	2
(Spain) 1973	Did not qualify				7	3	4
(Socialist Federal Republic of Yugoslavia) 1975	Did not enter				Did not enter		
(Belgium) 1977	8th	7	2	5	Qualified as host		
(Italy) 1979	12th	7	0	7	Directly qualified		
(Czechoslovakia) 1981	Did not qualify				5	1	4
(France) 1983	Did not qualify				5	2	3
(West Germany) 1985	Did not qualify				12	5	7
(Greece) 1987	Did not qualify				5	2	3
(Socialist Federal Republic of Yugoslavia) 1989	Did not qualify				4	2	2
(Italy) 1991	Did not qualify				10	6	4
(Germany) 1993	12th	6	1	5	6	4	2
(Greece) 1995	Did not qualify				6	2	4
(Spain) 1997	Did not qualify				10	4	6
(France) 1999	Did not qualify				13	4	9
(Turkey) 2001	Did not qualify				15	11	4
(Sweden) 2003	Did not qualify				10	3	7
(Serbia and Montenegro) 2005	Did not qualify				10	3	7
(Spain) 2007	Did not qualify				12	6	6
(Poland) 2009	Did not qualify				12	6	6
(Lithuania) 2011	21st	5	0	5	8	6	2
(Slovenia) 2013	9th	8	3	5	8	5	3
(France) (Croatia) (Germany) (Latvia) 2015	13th	6	3	3	6	5	1
(Finland) (Israel) (Romania) (Turkey) 2017	19th	5	1	4	6	5	1
(Czech Republic) (Georgia (country)) (Italy) (Germany) 2022	14th	6	3	3	10	8	2
(Cyprus) (Finland) (Poland) (Latvia) 2025	18th	5	2	3	6	3	3
(Estonia) (Greece) (Slovenia) (Spain) 2029	To be determined				In progress		
Total	19/42	130	48	82	201	104	97

== Results and fixtures ==
Win Loss

=== 2025 ===
28 November 2025 2027 FIBA World Cup qualifiers – 1st round	France	79–63	Belgium	Rouen, France
20:30 (UTC+1)	Scoring by quarter: 16–17, 13–14, 20–14, 30–18
	Pts: Sene 15; Rebs: Gaudoux 8 Asts: Albicy 6	Boxscore	Pts: Obasohan 14; Rebs: Bolavie, Van Vliet 5 Asts: four players 2	Arena: Kindarena; Attendance: 4,206; Referees: Antonio Conde (ESP), Paulo Marques (POR), Valerio Grigioni (ITA)

1 December 2025 2027 FIBA World Cup qualifiers – 1st round	Belgium	85–87	Hungary	Mons, Belgium
20:30 (UTC+1)	Scoring by quarter: 15–18, 21–27, 19–21, 30–21
	Pts: Obasohan 31; Rebs: Tumba 12; Asts: Mennes, Obasohan 5	Boxscore	Pts: Reuvers 26; Rebs: Reuvers 10; Asts: Somogyi 13	Arena: Mons.Arena; Attendance: 1,526; Referees: Ariadna Chueca (ESP), Andris Aunkrogers (LAT), Mehmet Şahin (TUR)

=== 2026 ===
27 February 2026 2027 FIBA World Cup qualifiers – 1st round	Belgium	66–71	Finland	Charleroi, Belgium
20:30 (UTC+1)	Scoring by quarter: 24–12, 13–20, 19–16, 10–23
	Pts: Lecomte 20; Rebs: Bolavie 6 Asts: Lecomte 6	Boxscore	Pts: Nkamhoua 23; Rebs: Nkamhoua 12; Asts: Maxhuni 6	Arena: Dôme; Attendance: 3,000; Referees: Petar Pešić (SRB), Blaž Zupančič (SVN), Elvis Binders-Čoders (LAT)

1 March 2026 2027 FIBA World Cup qualifiers – 1st round	Finland	78–75	Belgium	Espoo, Finland
18:30 (UTC+2)	Scoring by quarter: 17–22, 17–15, 22–15, 22–23
	Pts: Nkamhoua 23; Rebs: Madsen 11; Asts: four players 2	Boxscore	Pts: Schwartz 19; Rebs: Bratanovic, N. De Ridder 6 Asts: Lecomte 7	Arena: Espoo Metro Areena; Attendance: 6,822; Referees: Wojciech Liszka (POL), Carsten Straube (GER), Ritvars Helmšteins (LAT)

3 July 2026 2027 FIBA World Cup qualifiers – 1st round	Belgium	72–80	France	Antwerp, Belgium
20:30 (UTC+2)	Scoring by quarter: 13–22, 17–21, 25–16, 17–21
	Pts: Lecomte 17; Rebs: Van Vliet 6 Asts: Van Den Eynde 7	Boxscore	Pts: Coulibaly 13; Rebs: Gobert 11; Asts: Hifi 6	Arena: Lotto Arena; Attendance: 4,436; Referees: Michał Proc (POL), Andrea Bongiorni (ITA), Łukasz Jankowski (POL)

6 July 2026 2027 FIBA World Cup qualifiers – 1st round	Hungary	85–70	Belgium	Székesfehérvár, Hungary
18:00 (UTC+2)	Scoring by quarter: 23–19, 23–17, 16–21, 23–13
	Pts: Perl 19; Rebs: Maronka 5 Asts: Somogyi 11	Boxscore	Pts: three players 10; Rebs: Guisse 12; Asts: Lecomte 4	Arena: MET Aréna; Attendance: 4,752; Referees: Paulo Marques (POR), Branimir Galić (CRO), Nermin Hodžić (GER)

27 August 2026 EuroBasket 2029 pre-qualifiers – 2nd round	Belgium	92–81	Czech Republic	Ostend, Belgium
20:30 (UTC+2)	Scoring by quarter: 24–13, 21–20, 25–19, 22–29
	Pts: Kesteloot 22; Rebs: Guisse 9 Asts: Van Den Eynde 11	Boxscore	Pts: Bálint 20; Rebs: Zídek 6 Asts: Sehnal 7	Arena: COREtec Dôme; Attendance: 644; Referees: Dariusz Zapolski (POL), Ilias Karapanos (GRE), Jānis Rozenbergs (LAT)

26 November 2026 EuroBasket 2029 pre-qualifiers – 2nd round	Norway	vs.	Belgium	Kongsberg, Norway
19:30 (UTC+1)
		Boxscore		Arena: Kongsberghallen

29 November 2026 EuroBasket 2029 pre-qualifiers – 2nd round	Czech Republic	vs.	Belgium	Prague, Czech Republic
17:45 (UTC+1)
		Boxscore		Arena: Královka Arena

=== 2027 ===
28 February 2027 EuroBasket 2029 pre-qualifiers – 2nd round	Belgium	vs.	Norway	Belgium
--:-- (UTC+1)
		Boxscore

== Team ==
=== Current roster ===
Roster for the EuroBasket 2029 Pre-Qualifiers match on 27 August 2026 against Czech Republic.

Belgium men's national basketball team roster
Players
Coaches

Pos.	No.	Name	Age – Date of birth	Height	Club	Ctr.
PG	6	Noel Coleman	26 – 17 January 2000	1.80 m (5 ft 11 in)	Antwerp	(Belgium)
G/F	8	Joppe Mennes	23 – 20 May 2003	1.97 m (6 ft 6 in)	Oostende	(Belgium)
PG	9	Niels Van Den Eynde	25 – 27 December 2000	1.80 m (5 ft 11 in)	Aalst	(Belgium)
SF	11	Mamadou Guisse	24 – 15 December 2001	1.99 m (6 ft 6 in)	Limoges	(France)
F/C	12	Vrenz Bleijenbergh	25 – 14 October 2000	2.08 m (6 ft 10 in)	Galatasaray	(Turkey)
F/C	15	Mattias Palinckx	29 – 17 February 1997	2.06 m (6 ft 9 in)	Aalst	(Belgium)
F	21	Vincent Kesteloot	31 – 23 March 1995	2.02 m (6 ft 8 in)	Antwerp	(Belgium)
SG	22	Zaccharie Mortant	28 – 22 March 1998	1.92 m (6 ft 4 in)	Děčín	(Czech Republic)
F/C	24	Andy Van Vliet	31 – 27 July 1995	2.11 m (6 ft 11 in)	Granada	(Spain)
G/F	26	Niels De Ridder	25 – 7 February 2001	1.96 m (6 ft 5 in)	Antwerp	(Belgium)
PF	27	Leander Dedroog	27 – 5 August 1999	2.03 m (6 ft 8 in)	Kangoeroes	(Belgium)
SF	35	Bram Bogaerts	27 – 31 October 1998	1.98 m (6 ft 6 in)	Kortrijk Spurs	(Belgium)

Head coach

- (Belgium) Lionel Bosco (Interim)

Assistant coach(es)

- (Belgium) Christophe Beghin

Legend

- (C) Team captain
- Club – describes last
  club before the competition
- Age – describes age
  on 27 August 2026

=== Depth chart ===
Pos.	Starting 5	Bench 1	Bench 2
C	Andy Van Vliet	Mattias Palinckx
PF	Vrenz Bleijenbergh	Leander Dedroog
SF	Mamadou Guisse	Vincent Kesteloot	Bram Bogaerts
SG	Niels De Ridder	Zaccharie Mortant	Joppe Mennes
PG	Niels Van Den Eynde	Noel Coleman

== Head coach position ==
- (Belgium) Raymond Briot – (1946–1952)
- (Belgium) Louis van Hof – (1953–1956)
- (Belgium) Eddy Verswijvel – (1957–1960)
- (Belgium) René Mol – (1961)
- (Belgium) Roger Staes – (1962–1966)
- (Belgium) René Mol – (1967–1979)
- (Belgium) Tony Van den Bosch – (1989–1993)
- (Belgium) Yvan Slangen – (1993–1996)
- (Belgium) Tony Van den Bosch – (1997–2002)
- (Belgium) Eddy Casteels – (2005–2018)
- (Croatia) Dario Gjergja – (2018–2025)
- (France) Julien Mahé – (2025–2026)
- (Belgium) Lionel Bosco – (2026, Interim)

== Past rosters ==
1935 EuroBasket: finished 6th among 10 teams

3 René Demanck, 4 Émile Laermans, 5 Louis Levaux, 6 Pierre Van Basselaere, 7 Gustave Vereecken, 8 Gaston de Houwer, 9 Robert Breuwer (Coach: ?)

1936 Olympic Games: finished 19th among 21 teams

1 Robert Breuwer, 2 Gustave Crabbe, 3 René Demanck, 4 Raymond Gérard, 5 Émile Laermans, 6 Guillaume Merckx, 7 Pierre Van Basselaere, 8 Gustave Vereecken (Coach: ?)

1946 EuroBasket: finished 7th among 10 teams

3 Armand Van Wambeke, 4 Henri Servaes, 5 Julien Meuris, 6 Georges Baert, 7 Henri Hermans, 8 Émile Kets, 9 Augustin Bernaer, 10 Alexander Hollanders, 11 Louis Van De Goor, 12 Henri Hollanders, 13 Marcel de Haeck, 14 Pierre Van Basselaere, 23 Fernand Rossius, 25 Auguste Wijns (Coach: Raymond Briot)

1947 EuroBasket: finished 4th among 14 teams

3 Armand Van Wambeke, 4 René Steurbaut, 5 Julien Meuris, 6 Georges Baert, 7 Henri Hermans, 8 Émile Kets, 9 Henri Coosemans, 10 Gustave Poppe, 11 Alexander Hollanders, 12 Henri Hollanders, 13 Fernand Rossius, 14 François De Pauw, 17 Joseph Pirard, 21 Guillaume van Damme (Coach: Raymond Briot)

1948 Olympic Games: finished 11th among 23 teams

3 Armand Van Wambeke, 4 René Steurbaut, 5 Julien Meuris, 6 Georges Baert, 7 Henri Hermans, 8 Émile Kets, 9 Henri Coosemans, 10 Alexander Hollanders, 11 Henri Hollanders, 12 Augustin Bernaer, 13 Louis Van De Goor, 14 François De Pauw, 15 Gustave Poppe, 16 Léon Lampo (Coach: Raymond Briot)

1951 EuroBasket: finished 7th among 17 teams

3 Jef Eygel, 4 Henri Crick, 5 Francois Plas, 6 Georges Baert, 7 François De Pauw, 8 Émile Kets, 9 Henri Coosemans, 10 Désiré Ligon, 11 Alexis Van Gils, 12 Philippe Dewandelaer, 13 Guy Gekiere, 14 Roger van Harck (Coach: Raymond Briot)

1952 Olympic Games: finished 18th among 23 teams

3 Jef Eygel, 4 Yvan Delsarte, 5 Julien Meuris, 6 Félix Roosemont, 8 Johannes Ducheyne, 9 Henri Coosemans, 10 Désiré Ligon, 11 Alexis Van Gils, 12 Henri Crick, 13 Jules Boes, 14 Jan Ceulemans, 16 Josef du Jardin (Coach: Raymond Briot)

1953 EuroBasket: finished 10th among 17 teams

3 Maurice Chavagne, 4 René Steurbaut, 5 Julien Meuris, 6 Georges Baert, 7 André Vermeulen, 8 Émile Kets, 9 Henri Coosemans, 10 Désiré Ligon, 11 Alexis Van Gils, 12 Edouard Samson, 13 Jean Nolis, 14 Roger van Harck, 15 Joseph Decombe, 16 Félix Roosemont (Coach: Louis van Hof)

1957 EuroBasket: finished 12th among 16 teams

3 Albert van Mechelen, 4 Robert Jolijt, 5 Charles Storme, 6 Georges de Meyer, 7 Jean de Nayer, 8 Elie Deweerdt, 9 Emile Martin, 10 Eddy Terrace, 11 John Loridon, 12 Alex van den Avondt, 13 Charles Feyen, 14 Lucien van Kersschaever (Coach: Eddy Verswijvel)

1959 EuroBasket: finished 7th among 17 teams

3 Rene Aerts, 4 Richard Wagner, 5 Pierre van Huele, 6 Jef Eygel, 7 Francois de Pauw, 8 Elie Deweerdt, 9 Jean Steveniers, 10 Lucien van Kersschaever, 11 John Loridon, 12 Henry Raets, 13 Lievin Vinck, 14 Maurice Chavagne (Coach: Eddy Verswijvel)

1961 EuroBasket: finished 8th among 19 teams

4 Andre Desplats, 5 Pierre van Huele, 6 Jef Eygel, 7 Rene Aerts, 8 Jean Steveniers, 9 Henri Degraeve, 10 Guido Scholiers, 11 John Loridon, 12 Joseph Serron, 13 Alphonse Maes, 15 Oscar Wauters, 16 Charles Feyen (Coach: René Mol)

1963 EuroBasket: finished 8th among 16 teams

4 Francois Clement, 5 Pierre van Huele, 6 Jef Eygel, 7 Rene Aerts, 8 Francois d’Hoir, 9 Lucien Michelet, 10 Guido Scholiers, 11 John Loridon, 12 Pierre Dewandeler, 13 Lucien van Kersschaever, 14 Willy Ivens, 15 Camille Dierckx (Coach: Roger Staes)

1967 EuroBasket: finished 15th among 16 teams

4 Camille Dierckx, 5 Willy Ivens, 6 Jef Eygel, 7 Rene Aerts, 8 Lucien Michelet, 9 Robert van Herzele, 10 Raoul Schoeters, 11 John Loridon, 12 Willy d’Hondt, 13 Lucien van Kersschaever, 14 Etienne Geerts, 15 Alfons Declerck (Coach: René Mol)

1977 EuroBasket: finished 8th among 12 teams

4 Alain Stollenberg, 5 Ive van Poppelen, 6 Robert van Herzele, 7 Olin "Corky" Bell, 8 Etienne Geerts, 9 Rene van den Broeck, 10 Imre Nytrai, 11 Jos Peeters, 12 Francois Huysmans, 13 Christian Becknel, 14 Roger Marien, 15 Hector Vermeersch (Coach: René Mol)

1979 EuroBasket: finished 12th among 12 teams

4 Alain Stollenberg, 5 Herman Reynders, 6 Eric Rogiers, 7 Jos Peeters, 8 Ive van Poppelen, 9 Tony Van den Bosch, 10 Imre Nytrai, 11 Rene van den Broeck, 12 Francois Huysmans, 13 Christian Becknel, 14 Etienne Geerts, 15 Rik Samaey (Coach: René Mol)

1993 EuroBasket: finished 12th among 16 teams

4 Jacques Stas, 5 Éric Struelens, 6 Dirk Snyders, 7 Ronny Bayer, 8 Rik Samaey, 9 Danny Herman, 10 Erik Cleymans, 11 Marc Deheneffe, 12 Herman Bruyninckx, 13 Ivan Verberckt, 14 Daniël Goethals, 15 Dimitri Lambrecht (Coach: Tony Van den Bosch)

2011 EuroBasket: finished 21st among 24 teams

4 Roel Moors, 5 Sam Van Rossom, 6 Christophe Beghin, 7 Randy Oveneke, 8 Jorn Steinbach, 9 Jonathan Tabu, 10 Dimitri Lauwers,
11 Guy Muya (C), 12 Marcus Faison, 13 Maxime De Zeeuw, 14 Tomas Van Den Spiegel, 15 D. J. Mbenga (Coach: Eddy Casteels)

2013 EuroBasket: finished 9th among 24 teams

4 Roel Moors, 5 Sam Van Rossom, 6 Christophe Beghin, 7 Axel Hervelle, 8 Jean-Marc Mwema, 9 Jonathan Tabu, 10 Quentin Serron,
11 Guy Muya (C), 12 Wen Mukubu, 13 Maxime De Zeeuw, 14 Sacha Massot, 15 Yannick Driesen (Coach: Eddy Casteels)

2015 EuroBasket: finished 13th among 24 teams

4 Lionel Bosco, 5 Sam Van Rossom, 7 Axel Hervelle (C), 8 Jean-Marc Mwema, 9 Jonathan Tabu, 10 Quentin Serron, 12 Wen Mukubu, 13 Pierre-Antoine Gillet, 14 Maxime De Zeeuw, 22 Kevin Tumba, 23 Jean Salumu, 24 Matt Lojeski (Coach: Eddy Casteels)

2017 EuroBasket: finished 19th among 24 teams

4 Manu Lecomte, 5 Sam Van Rossom, 7 Axel Hervelle (C), 8 Jean-Marc Mwema, 9 Jonathan Tabu, 10 Quentin Serron, 12 Jean Salumu, 13 Pierre-Antoine Gillet, 14 Maxime De Zeeuw, 16 Kevin Tumba, 19 Ismaël Bako, 22 Vincent Kesteloot (Coach: Eddy Casteels)

2022 EuroBasket: finished 14th among 24 teams

4 Manu Lecomte, 8 Jean-Marc Mwema, 9 Jonathan Tabu, 13 Pierre-Antoine Gillet, 14 Maxime De Zeeuw (C), 16 Kevin Tumba, 17 Hans Vanwijn, 18 Alexandre Libert, 19 Ismaël Bako, 21 Vrenz Bleijenbergh, 25 Haris Bratanovic, 32 Retin Obasohan (Coach: Dario Gjergja)

2025 EuroBasket: finished 18th among 24 teams

4 Manu Lecomte, 8 Jean-Marc Mwema (C), 10 Hans Vanwijn, 11 Loïc Schwartz, 16 Kevin Tumba, 19 Ismaël Bako, 24 Andy Van Vliet,
29 Siebe Ledegen, 34 Niels Van Den Eynde, 36 Joppe Mennes, 41 Godwin Tshimanga, 44 Mamadou Guisse (Coach: Dario Gjergja)

== Kit ==
=== Manufacturer ===
- 2015: Kipsta
- 2018–2024: Spalding
- 2025–present: Decathlon

=== Sponsor ===
- 2015: Voo

== See also ==
- Sport in Belgium
- Belgium women's national basketball team
- Belgium men's national under-20 basketball team
- Belgium men's national under-18 basketball team
- Belgium men's national under-16 basketball team
- Belgium men's national 3x3 team
