= EuroBasket 1947 =

International basketball event

Tournament details
- Host country: Czechoslovakia
- City: Prague
- Dates: 27 April – 3 May
- Teams: 14
- Venue: 1 (in 1 host city)

Final positions
- Champions: Soviet Union (1st title)
- Runners-up: Czechoslovakia
- Third place: Egypt
- Fourth place: Belgium

Tournament statistics
- MVP: (Soviet Union) Joann Lõssov
- Top scorer: (France) Jacques Perrier (12.7 points per game)

The 1947 FIBA European Championship, commonly called FIBA EuroBasket 1947, was the fifth FIBA EuroBasket regional basketball championship, held by FIBA. Fourteen national teams affiliated with the International Basketball Federation (FIBA) took part in the competition. Czechoslovakia hosted the contest, which was held in Prague.

== Results ==
The 1947 competition consisted of a preliminary round, with two groups of four teams and two groups of three teams each. Each team played the other teams in its group once. The top two teams in each of the groups advanced into four-team semifinal groups 1 and 2 and were guaranteed a top-eight finish, with the remaining teams playing in three-team groups 3 and 4 for places 9–14.

Each team again played each other team in its group once. The bottom team in each of the three-team groups played its counterpart for 13th and 14th places. Similarly, middle teams in those groups played each other for 11th and 12th places and top teams played for 9th and 10th. The top eight places were determined in the same fashion, with top teams playing each other for gold and silver, second place teams in each playing for bronze and 4th, and so on.

=== First round ===
==== Group A ====
Pos	Team	Pld	W	L	PF	PA	PD	Pts	Qualification
1	Czechoslovakia	3	3	0	208	61	+147	6	Upper bracket
2	Poland	3	2	1	108	106	+2	5	Upper bracket
3	Romania	3	1	2	107	157	−50	4	Lower bracket
4	Netherlands	3	0	3	84	183	−99	3	Lower bracket

Source: fibaeurope.com

Poland	51–32	Romania
Czechoslovakia	93–19	Netherlands
Poland	40–23	Netherlands
Romania	25–64	Czechoslovakia
Netherlands	42–50	Romania
Czechoslovakia	51–17	Poland

==== Group B ====
Pos	Team	Pld	W	L	PF	PA	PD	Pts	Qualification
1	Soviet Union	2	2	0	112	44	+68	4	Upper bracket
2	Hungary	2	1	1	83	89	−6	3	Upper bracket
3	Yugoslavia	2	0	2	38	100	−62	2	Lower bracket

Source: fibaeurope.com

Soviet Union	50–11	Yugoslavia
Soviet Union	62–33	Hungary
Yugoslavia	27–50	Hungary

==== Group C ====
Pos	Team	Pld	W	L	PF	PA	PD	Pts	Qualification
1	France	2	2	0	167	38	+129	4	Upper bracket
2	Bulgaria	2	1	1	88	80	+8	3	Upper bracket
3	Austria	2	0	2	19	156	−137	2	Lower bracket

Source: fibaeurope.com

Bulgaria	56–13	Austria
France	100 – 6	Austria
France	67–32	Bulgaria

==== Group D ====
Pos	Team	Pld	W	L	PF	PA	PD	Pts	Qualification
1	Egypt	3	3	0	193	92	+101	6	Upper bracket
2	Belgium	3	2	1	183	78	+105	5	Upper bracket
3	Italy	3	1	2	119	92	+27	4	Lower bracket
4	Albania	3	0	3	45	278	−233	3	Lower bracket

Source: fibaeurope.com

Italy	60–15	Albania
Belgium	35–46	Egypt
Belgium	114 – 11	Albania
Egypt	43–38	Italy
Albania	19 – 104	Egypt
Italy	21–34	Belgium

=== Second round ===
The middle team of each of the groups of three did not compete in the second round, as they advanced directly to a 5th/6th place playoff in the final round. The top team of each of those groups played one of the top two teams of the group of four, with rankings 1st–4th at stake. Similarly, the bottom team in each group of three played one of the two lower teams in the group of four in a semifinal for 7th–10th places.

==== Upper bracket ====
===== Group 1 =====
Pos	Team	Pld	W	L	PF	PA	PD	Pts	Qualification
1	Czechoslovakia	3	3	0	116	99	+17	6	Final
2	Belgium	3	2	1	86	85	+1	5	3rd place playoff
3	France	3	1	2	93	100	−7	4	5th place playoff
4	Hungary	3	0	3	116	127	−11	3	7th place playoff

Source: fibaeurope.com

Hungary	48–52	Czechoslovakia
France	26–27	Belgium
Belgium	30–27	Hungary
France	22–32	Czechoslovakia
Hungary	41–45	France
Czechoslovakia	32–29	Belgium

===== Group 2 =====
Pos	Team	Pld	W	L	PF	PA	PD	Pts	Qualification
1	Soviet Union	3	3	0	137	74	+63	6	Final
2	Egypt	3	2	1	135	112	+23	5	3rd place playoff
3	Poland	3	1	2	78	115	−37	4	5th place playoff
4	Bulgaria	3	0	3	89	138	−49	3	7th place playoff

Source: fibaeurope.com

Poland	28–52	Egypt
Soviet Union	55–24	Bulgaria
Soviet Union	46–32	Egypt
Bulgaria	27–32	Poland
Egypt	51–38	Bulgaria
Poland	18–36	Soviet Union

==== Lower bracket ====
===== Group 3 =====
Pos	Team	Pld	W	L	PF	PA	PD	Pts	Qualification
1	Romania	2	2	0	142	42	+100	4	9th place playoff
2	Austria	2	1	1	67	96	−29	3	11th place playoff
3	Albania	2	0	2	46	117	−71	2	13th place playoff

Source: fibaeurope.com

Austria	23–69	Romania
Albania	19–73	Romania
Albania	27–44	Austria

===== Group 4 =====
Pos	Team	Pld	W	L	PF	PA	PD	Pts	Qualification
1	Italy	2	1	1	93	72	+21	3	9th place playoff
2	Netherlands	2	1	1	65	66	−1	3	11th place playoff
3	Yugoslavia	2	1	1	65	85	−20	3	13th place playoff

Source: fibaeurope.com

Italy	59–33	Yugoslavia
Italy	34–39	Netherlands
Yugoslavia	32–26	Netherlands

=== Playoff games ===
Each team had one final game in order to determine their tournament ranking

13th place:

Yugoslavia	90–13	Albania

11th place:

Netherlands	54–33	Austria

9th place:

Italy	55–39	Romania

7th place:

Hungary	59–29	Bulgaria

5th place:

France	62–29	Poland

3rd place:

Egypt	50–48	Belgium

Championship:

Soviet Union	56–37	Czechoslovakia

1947 FIBA EuroBasket champions

Soviet Union
1st title

== Final standings ==
1. Soviet Union
2. Czechoslovakia
3. Egypt
4. Belgium
5. France
6. Poland
7. Hungary
8. Bulgaria
9. Italy
10. Romania
11. Netherlands
12. Austria
13. Yugoslavia
14. Albania

== Team rosters ==
1. Soviet Union: Otar Korkia, Stepas Butautas, Joann Lõssov, Nodar Dzhordzhikiya, Ilmar Kullam, Anatoly Konev, Evgeny Alekseev, Alexander Moiseev, Justinas Lagunavičius, Kazys Petkevičius, Yuri Ushakov, Vytautas Kulakauskas, Vasili Kolpakov, Sergei Tarasov (Coach: Pavel Tsetlin)

2. Czechoslovakia: Ivan Mrázek, Miloš Bobocký, Jiří Drvota, Josef Ezr, Jan Kozák, Gustav Hermann, Miroslav Vondráček, Ladislav Trpkoš, Karel Bělohradský, Miroslav Dostál, Milan Fraňa, Václav Krása, Josef Toms, Emil Velenský (Coach: Josef Fleischlinger)

3. Egypt: Youssef Mohammed Abbas, Fouad Abdel Meguid El-Kheir, Youssef Abou Ouf, Guido Acher, Maurice Calife, Gabriel Armand "Gaby" Catafago, Abdel Rahman Hafez Ismail, Zaki Selim Harari, Hassan Moawad, Hussein Kamel Montasser, Wahid Chafik Saleh, Albert Fahmy Tadros, Zaki Yehia

4. Belgium: Ange Hollanders, Henri Hollanders, Gustave Poppe, Emile Kets, Georges Baert, Henri Hermans, Julien Meuris, Rene Steurbaut, Francois de Pauw, Henri Coosemans, Guillaume van Damme, Armand van Wambeke, Fernand Rossius, Joseph Pirard (Coach: Raymond Briot)

6. Poland: Jacek Arlet, Ludwik Barszczewski, Bohdan Bartosiewicz, Jerzy Dowgird, Edward Jarczyński, Henryk Jaźnicki, Władysław Maleszewski, Romuald Markowski, Zbigniew Resich, Paweł Stok, Tadeusz Ulatowski, Józef Żyliński

13. Yugoslavia: Tullio Rochlitzer, Mirko Marjanović, Miodrag Stefanović, Božo Grkinić, Ladislav Demšar, Nebojša Popović, Zlatko Kovačević, Aleksandar Gec, Aleksandar Milojković, Srđan Kalember, Zorko Cvetković, Ottone Olivieri, Božidar Munćan (Coach: Stevica Čolović)
