= 2023–24 Belgian Basketball Cup =

Belgian Cup
- Season: 2023–24

Finals
- Champions: Limburg United (2nd title)
- Runners-up: Spirou Charleroi
- Finals MVP: Osun Osunniyi (Limburg United); Roman Penn (Limburg United)

The 2023–24 Belgian Basketball Cup, for sponsorship reasons the Lotto Basketball Cup, is the 70th edition of Belgium's national basketball cup tournament. Antwerp Giants are defending champions. Limburg United wins the tournament on 10 March 2024 against Spirou Charleroi for a second time in its history.

== Round of 32 ==
In the round of 32, the competition sees the entry of professional teams from the BNXT League. Previous qualifying rounds took place from June to Septembre.

15 Septembre 2023
20:30

Gembo BBC	81–91	Mons-Hainaut

Sporthal Luisbekelaar, Antwerp

15 Septembre 2023
20:30

Leuven Bears B	62–81	Limburg United

Sporthal Wilsele, Leuven

15 Septembre 2023
20:30

Basket SKT Ieper	74–96	RSW Liège Basket

Stedelijke Halle, Ypres

16 Septembre 2023
20:00

BC Mailleux Comblain	87–61	Union BC Quaregnon

Salle omnisports de Comblain, Comblain-au-Pont

16 Septembre 2023
20:15

Basket Waregem	60–94	Antwerp Giants

Sportcafé De Treffer, Waregem

16 Septembre 2023
20:15

Basket Willebreok	80–114	Okapi Aalst

Sporthal de Schalk, Willebroek

16 Septembre 2023
20:30

Royal IV Brussels	54–69	Kangoeroes Mechelen

Palais du Midi, Brussels

16 Septembre 2023
20:30

RBC Ciney	77–63	Hasselt BT

Salle Joseph Laloux, Ciney

16 September 2023
20:30

LDP Donza	88–84	Oxaco BBC Boechout

OCP, De Pinte

16 Septembre 2023
20:30

San Marzuin BC Namur Belgrade	67–106	Spirou Charleroi

Centre sportif José Tyssaen, Namur

16 Septembre 2023
20:30

BC Ninane	79–53	Royal Nivelles Basketball

Salle omnisports de Ninane, Ninane

16 Septembre 2023
21:00

Limburg United B	50–84	Brussels Basketball

Sporthal Kuringen, Hasselt

16 Septembre 2023
21:00

BCCA Neufchâteau	108–107	Avanti Brugge 2015

Centre Adeps Neufchâteau, Neufchâteau

17 Septembre 2023
16:00

BBC Falco Gent	67–80	Kortrijk Spurs

Sporthal Sint-Jancolllege, Ghent

17 Septembre 2023
16:00

BBC Lommel	74–92	BC Oostende

Sporthal de Soeverein, Lommel

20 Septembre 2023
20:30

BC Guco Lier	70–90	Leuven Bears

Sporthal Stadspark, Lier

== Round of 16 ==
The draw for the round of 16 was held on 22 Septembre 2023. Teams from the second division and lower leagues compete in a single game, whereas games featuring two BNXT League teams are held through a two-legged tie.

Single-elimination

20 Octobre 2023
20:00

BC Mailleux Comblain	64–101	BC Oostende

Salle omnisports de Comblain, Comblain-au-Pont

20 Octobre 2023
21:00

BCCA Neufchâteau	80–101	Kangoeroes Mechelen

Centre Adeps Neufchâteau, Neufchâteau

21 Octobre 2023
20:00

RBC Ciney	67–100	Antwerp Giants

Salle Joseph Laloux, Ciney

21 Octobre 2023
20:30

LDP Donza	61–76	Limburg United

OCP, De Pinte

28 Octobre 2023
20:00

BC Ninane	69–98	Spirou Charleroi

Salle omnisports de Ninane, Ninane

BNXT matchups

Team 1	Agg.	Team 2	1st leg	2nd leg
Brussels Basketball	152–139	Okapi Aalst	67–75	85–64
RSW Liège Basket	154–153	Kortrijk Spurs	73–73	81–80
Leuven Bears	142–125	Mons-Hainaut	75-68	67–57

Brussels Basketball vs. Okapi Aalst

20 Octobre 2023	Okapi Aalst	75–67	Brussels Basketball	Aalst
20:30
				Arena: Forum Aalst

22 Octobre 2023	Brussels Basketball	85–64	Kangoeroes Mechelen	Brussels
15:00
				Arena: Sports complex Neder-Over-Heembeek

RSW Liège Basket vs. Kortrijk Spurs

20 Octobre 2023	Kortrijk Spurs	73–73	RSW Liège Basket	Kortrijk
20:30
				Arena: Sportcampus Lange Munte

22 Octobre 2023	RSW Liège Basket	81–80	Kortrijk Spurs	Liège
15:00
				Arena: Country Hall

Leuven Bears vs. Mons-Hainaut

20 Octobre 2023	Mons-Hainaut	68–75	Leuven Bears	Mons
20:30
				Arena: Mons.Arena

22 Octobre 2023	Leuven Bears	67–57	Mons-Hainaut	Leuven
15:00
				Arena: Sportoase

== Quarter-finals ==
The first leg games were played on 8–9 December, and the second leg games were played on 10–13 December 2023.

Team 1	Agg.	Team 2	1st leg	2nd leg
Kangoeroes Mechelen	169–145	Antwerp Giants	90–69	79–77
Brussels Basketball	111–115	Spirou Charleroi	68–68	43–47
Limburg United	142–136	BC Oostende	64–66	78–70
Leuven Bears	183–164	RSW Liège Basket	90-70	93–94

Kangoeroes Mechelen vs. Antwerp Giants

9 December 2023	Kangoeroes Mechelen	90–69	Antwerp Giants	Mechelen
20:30
	Pts: Palinckx 21; Rebs: Lightfoot 9 Asts: Loubry 6 Eff:: Brandwijk 23	Report	Pts: Sueing 14; Rebs: Mwema, Rogiers 5 Asts: Buggenhout 6 Eff: Sueing 18	Arena: Sporthal Winketkaai

13 December 2023	Antwerp Giants	77–79	Kangoeroes Mechelen	Antwerp
20:00	Scoring by quarter: 17–25, 17–17, 19–18, 24–19
	Pts: Bolton 18; Rebs: Kreuser 10; Asts: Bolton 4 Eff:: Bolton 21	Report	Pts: Whyte 23; Rebs: Brandwijk, Peciukevivius 5 Asts: Mukubu, Peciukevivius 5 Eff: Whyte 24	Arena: Lotto Arena

Brussels Basketball vs. Spirou Charleroi

8 December 2023	Brussels Basketball	68–68	Spirou Charleroi	Brussels
20:30
	Pts: Horvath 13; Rebs: Horvath 10; Asts: Harris 4 Eff:: Horvath 24	Report	Pts: Samardzic 14; Rebs: Kuta 8 Asts: Kuta, Roberts 4 Eff: Kuta 22	Arena: Sports Complex; Neder-Over-Heembeek

10 December 2023	Spirou Charleroi	47–43	Brussels Basketball	Charleroi
16:00	Scoring by quarter: 11–5, 10–16, 15–10, 11–12
	Pts: Roberts 30; Rebs: Prepelič 11; Asts: Heath, Roberts, Samardzic 2 Eff:: Butler, Roberts 10	Report	Pts: Ambrose 10; Rebs: Horvath 10; Asts: Hazard 3 Eff: Ambrose 13	Arena: Dôme

Limburg United vs. BC Oostende

8 December 2023	Limburg United	64–66	BC Oostende	Hasselt
20:30
	Pts: Osunniyi 16; Rebs: Delalieux 6 Asts: Serron 5 Eff:: Osunniyi, Serron 15	Report	Pts: Ahmad 22; Rebs: Jefferson 7 Asts: Buysschaert 5 Eff: Ahmad 26	Arena: Sporthal Alverberg

10 December 2023	BC Oostende	70–78	Limburg United	Ostend
16:00	Scoring by quarter: 26–10, 15–23, 16–20, 13–25
	Pts: Jefferson 23; Rebs: Gillet 7 Asts: Van Rossom 6 Eff:: Jefferson 23	Report	Pts: Lesuisse 21; Rebs: Delalieux 8 Asts: Lesuisse 5 Eff: Lesuisse 25	Arena: COREtec Dôme

Leuven Bears vs. RSW Liège Basket

8 December 2023	Leuven Bears	90–70	RSW Liège Basket	Leuven
20:30
	Pts: Key 32; Rebs: Vanderhaegen 12; Asts: Meeusen 5 Eff:: Key 35	Report	Pts: Troisfontaines 21; Rebs: Hagins 9 Asts: Lemaire 8 Eff: Troisfontaines 21	Arena: Sportoase

11 December 2023	RSW Liège Basket	94–93	Leuven Bears	Liège
20:30	Scoring by quarter: 23–23, 23–19, 26–25, 22–26
	Pts: Anosike 23; Rebs: Tumba 13; Asts: Rodríguez 6 Eff:: Hagins, Rodríguez 29	Report	Pts: Key 24; Rebs: Vanderhaegen 8 Asts: Key 8 Eff: Key 28	Arena: Country Hall

== Semi-finals ==
The first leg games were played on 19 January, and the second leg games were played on 21 January 2024.

Team 1	Agg.	Team 2	1st leg	2nd leg
Kangoeroes Mechelen	133–162	Spirou Charleroi	67–88	66–74
Limburg United	148–111	Leuven Bears	77–64	71–47

Kangoeroes Mechelen vs. Spirou Charleroi

19 January 2024	Kangoeroes Mechelen	67–88	Spirou Charleroi	Mechelen
20:30	Scoring by quarter: 13-19, 17-25, 19-22, 18-22
	Pts: Whyte 18; Rebs: Lightfoot 7 Asts: Mukubu, Peciukevivius, Whyte 3 Eff:: Whyte 20	Report	Pts: Roberts 34; Rebs: Kuta 7 Asts: Heath 5 Eff: Roberts 33	Arena: Sporthal Winketkaai

21 January 2024	Spirou Charleroi	74–66	Kangoeroes Mechelen	Charleroi
15:30	Scoring by quarter: 17–21, 24–20, 18–13, 14–12
	Pts: Roberts 13; Rebs: Prepelič 8 Asts: Roberts 2 Eff:: Roberts, Heath 16	Report	Pts: Lightfoot 11; Rebs: Lightfoot 8 Asts: Mukubu 5 Eff: Lightfoot 12	Arena: Dôme

Limburg United vs. Leuven Bears

19 January 2024	Limburg United	77–64	Leuven Bears	Hasselt
20:30	Scoring by quarter: 23-11, 23-23, 12-17, 19-13
	Pts: Cale 22; Rebs: Cale 8 Asts: Hammonds 8 Eff:: Cale 26	Report	Pts: Key 20; Rebs: Riley 8 Asts: Vanderhaegen 3 Eff: Key 21	Arena: Sporthal Alverberg

21 January 2024	Leuven Bears	47–71	Limburg United	Leuven
15:30	Scoring by quarter: 12–13, 15–24, 9–18, 11–16
	Pts: Tate 10; Rebs: Vanderhaegen 5 Asts: Tate 3 Eff:: Tate 17	Report	Pts: Penn 16; Rebs: Cale, Delalieux, Lesuisse, Penn 5 Asts: Osunniyi, Penn 4 Eff: Osunniyi 18	Arena: Sportoase

== Final ==
The final was held on 10 March 2024 at Forest National in Brussels.

10 March 2024	Spirou Charleroi	58–70	Limburg United	Brussels
15:30	Scoring by quarter: 20-16, 14-16, 17-19, 7-19
	Pts: Collins 18; Rebs: Kuta 8 Asts: Heath 5 Eff:: Collins 18	Report	Pts: Osuniyi 12; Rebs: Osuniyi 10; Asts: Penn, Serron 3 Eff: Osuniyi, Penn 15	Arena: Forest National
