= Pro Basketball League Coach of the Year =

The Basketball League Belgium Division I Coach of the Year (Coach van het Jaar in Dutch) is an annual Basketball League Belgium Division I award given to the best coach of the league. The award is handed out after the end of the regular season.

== Winners ==
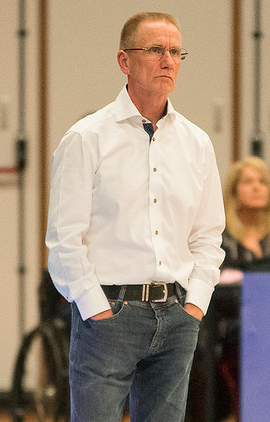
Eddy Casteels won the award in 2009

^	Denotes coach who is still active in the league
*	Inducted into the Naismith Memorial Basketball Hall of Fame
†	Denotes coach whose team won championship that year
Coach (X)	Denotes the number of times the coach had won the award at that time

Season	Player	Nationality	Team	Ref(s)
2008–09	Eddy Casteels	Belgium	Port of Antwerp Giants	
2009–10	Jurgen Van Meerbeeck	Belgium	Verviers-Pepinster	
2010–11	Bradley Dean	United States	Generali Okapi Aalstar	
2011–12	Bradley Dean (2)	United States	Generali Okapi Aalstar	
2012–13†	Dario Gjergja^	Croatia	Telenet Oostende	
2013–14	Fulvio Bastianini	Belgium	Liège Basket	
2014–15	Brian Lynch^	United States	Limburg United	
2015–16	Roel Moors^	Belgium	Port of Antwerp Giants	
2016-17†	Dario Gjergja (2)^	Croatia	Telenet Oostende	
2017–18	Dario Gjergja (3)^	Croatia	Oostende	
2018–19	Roel Moors (2)^	Belgium	Antwerp Giants	
