= Yannick Schoepen =

Belgian basketball player

No. 23 – Port of Antwerp Giants
- Position: Center

Personal information
- Born: February 14, 1992 (age 34)
- Listed height: 6 ft 8 in (2.03 m)
- Listed weight: 198 lb (90 kg)

Career information
- NBA draft: 2014: undrafted
- Playing career: 2014–present

Career history
- 2014–2017: Port of Antwerp Giants

Yannick Schoepen (born February 14, 1992) is a Belgian professional basketball player. Schoepen plays the center position, and currently plays for Basics Melsele-Beveren.
