= Sebastien Bellin =

Brazilian-Belgian basketball player

Personal information
- Born: May 14, 1978 (age 48) São Paulo, Brazil
- Listed height: 6 ft 9 in (2.06 m)
- Listed weight: 251 lb (114 kg)

Career information
- College: Marist (1996–1998); Oakland (1998–2000)
- NBA draft: 2000: undrafted
- Playing career: 2000–2015
- Position: Center

Career history
- 2000–2001: Sicc Aurora Jesi
- 2001–2003: Power Wevelgem
- 2003–2006: Antwerp Giants
- 2006–2009: Telindus Oostende
- 2009: Prostějov
- 2009: Hanzevast Capitals
- 2009–2010: Optima Gent
- 2010–2012: Belfius Mons-Hainaut
- 2012–2013: Kangoeroes Boom
- 2013–2014: Gent Hawks
- 2014–2015: CEP Fleurus

Career highlights
- Belgian League champion (2007); 2× Belgian Cup winner (2008, 2011)

Sebastien Bellin (born May 14, 1978) is a Brazilian-Belgian former professional basketball player. He has also been a part of the Belgian national basketball team in his career, he made his last appearance in 2010.

He was seriously injured at Brussels Airport during the 2016 Brussels bombings.

In 2023, a documentary was released following Bellin after 13 surgeries over six years due to the aftermath of the attack. The documentary covered Bellin's training for and participation in the Ironman Triathlon in Hawaii.
