= Ronnie McCollum =

American basketball player and coach

Personal information
- Born: December 28, 1978 (age 47) Fayette, Alabama, U.S.
- Listed height: 6 ft 4 in (1.93 m)
- Listed weight: 250 lb (113 kg)

Career information
- High school: Fayette County (Fayette, Alabama)
- College: Centenary (1997–2001)
- NBA draft: 2001: undrafted
- Playing career: 2001–2016
- Position: Shooting guard / point guard
- Number: 7

Career history

Playing
- 2001–2002: Liaoning Panpan Hunters
- 2002–2003: UKJ-SUBA
- 2003–2004: Barreirense
- 2004–2005: Bavi
- 2006–2007: Liège Bulls
- 2007–2009: Bree
- 2009–2011: Intercollege ETHA
- 2011–2016: Houthalen

Coaching
- 2017: Limburg United

Career highlights
- NCAA scoring champion (2001); First-team All-TAAC (1999); Second-team All-TAAC (1998)

Ronnie Allen McCollum II (born December 28, 1978) is an American former professional basketball player and coach. McCollum has had a successful international career, but it was his collegiate career playing for the Centenary Gentlemen basketball team between 1997–98 and 2000–01 for which he is best known.

== Early life ==
McCollum was born in Tuscaloosa, Alabama, but grew up in Fayette. He attended Fayette County High School from 1993–94 to 1996–97 where he was a star basketball player. He averaged 17 points per game (ppg) as a freshman, 20 ppg as a sophomore, 22 ppg as a junior and then finished second in the state in scoring as a senior with 30 ppg. In his final two seasons, McCollum was a 5A All-State selection and conference MVP awardee as FCHS finished ranked in the top five in the state. For his high school career, he recorded 2,204 points, 750 rebounds, 400 assists and 150 steals. McCollum signed to play NCAA Division I basketball at the Centenary College of Louisiana on April 23, 1997.

== College career ==
McCollum made an immediate impact at Centenary as he led the team in scoring at 17.5 ppg during his freshman season. He made 101 three-point field goals, which set school and Trans America Athletic Conference (TAAC) records, and was selected to the All-TAAC Second Team, All-Newcomer Team and the All-Louisiana Third Team. As a sophomore in 1998–99, he repeated as the team's scoring leader while averaging 19.4 ppg. He also finished 11th in the nation in free throw shooting percentage (87.4%).

McCollum's junior season in 1999–2000 saw him burst onto the national scene as he finished third in the country in scoring at 23.8 ppg. He finished 11th in three-pointers made per game (3.3) and scored 30 or more points in a game five times. He was named to the All-Independent First Team and was the Independent Conference Player of the Year runner-up. McCollum also hit back-to-back game-winning three-point shots against Southwest Texas State and Texas A&M. The following year—his senior season—he continued to score in high numbers and finished as the nation's leading scorer with a 29.1 ppg average, which was 5.3 points per game more than the second highest scorer (Eastern Illinois' Kyle Hill averaged 23.8). McCollum was an Honorable Mention All-America selection and named to the All-Independent Conference First Team. He set a school single season record with 787 points, and he was selected as the 2001 Louisiana Player of the Year by the Louisiana Sports Writers Association.

McCollum finished his Centenary College career with 2,524 points, 400 rebounds and 119 assists in 113 career games. He fell 12 points shy of breaking the school's all-time career scoring record of 2,535 set by Willie Jackson between 1980–81 and 1983–84.

== Professional career ==
After graduating college with a bachelor's degree in Health and Science Exercise, McCollum played for the Golden State Warriors in the NBA Summer League. He had gone undrafted in the 2001 NBA draft, and when no teams signed him as a free agent, he took his game abroad. Between 2001–02 and 2009–10, McCollum played for seven teams in five countries, (China, Austria, Portugal, Belgium and Cyprus.) He won the Belgian 2nd Division league championship in 2008–09 and was named the season MVP, Guard of the Year and Import Player of the Year while averaging 14 points, 5.2 rebounds, 4.4 assists, and 1.6 steals per game. The only season McCollum has missed since turning professional was in 2005–06. He had signed a contract in Saint-Étienne, France, but he ruptured his Achilles tendon in the third practice of the season. Up through the 2008–09 basketball season, McCollum holds professional career averages of 17.8 points, 3.5 rebounds 1.7 assists and 2.6 threes made per game.

== Coaching career ==
On April 9, 2017, McCollum was announced as the new head coach for Limburg United of the Belgian Basketball League for the 2017–18 season. On November 17, 2017, McCollum was fired by Limburg after a 2–6 start.

== Honors and awards ==
High school

- Sectional champion (1994)
- 2× conference MVP
- 4× all-conference selection
- 4× all-area performer
- Second in state scoring average (1997)
- 2× top five team in state (1996, 1997)

College

- 4× Centenary leading scorer
- 4× All-Conference (inc. Independent)
- School record for points in a season (787)
- Fifth most three-pointers in a season by a freshman in NCAA history (101)
- School record 345 three-pointers
- Nation's leading scorer as a senior (29.1 ppg)
  - Also led in free throws made (214)
  - Fifth in free throw shooting percentage (90.7%)
- Honorable Mention All-America (2001)
- 2001 Louisiana Player Of The Year
- Shreveport, Louisiana named March 13, 2001 as "Ronnie McCollum Day"

Professional

- League all-star (2003, 2004)
- First team All-Import and Second Team All-Portugal (2004)
- Free throw percentage leader (2004)
- Belgian league season record of 88 three-pointers (2005)
- Led Belgian league in three-pointers made [83] and second in three-point percentage (2007)
- Team's best overall league record (2009)
  - League champion (2009)
  - MVP, guard of the year and import player of the year (2009)

== Personal ==
McCollum has one daughter and son by his wife, Miek, whom he met while playing in Belgium. He is an only child of parents Ronnie and Beverly McCollum. His uncle is Cedric Wright, who was a standout defensive football player at Memphis State and is still ranked in the top 10 for many defensive statistical categories, while his cousin is Mike Davis, the current head men's basketball coach for the Mississippi Valley State Delta Devils.

== See also ==
- List of NCAA Division I men's basketball season scoring leaders
