= Myles Cale =

American basketball player (born 1999)

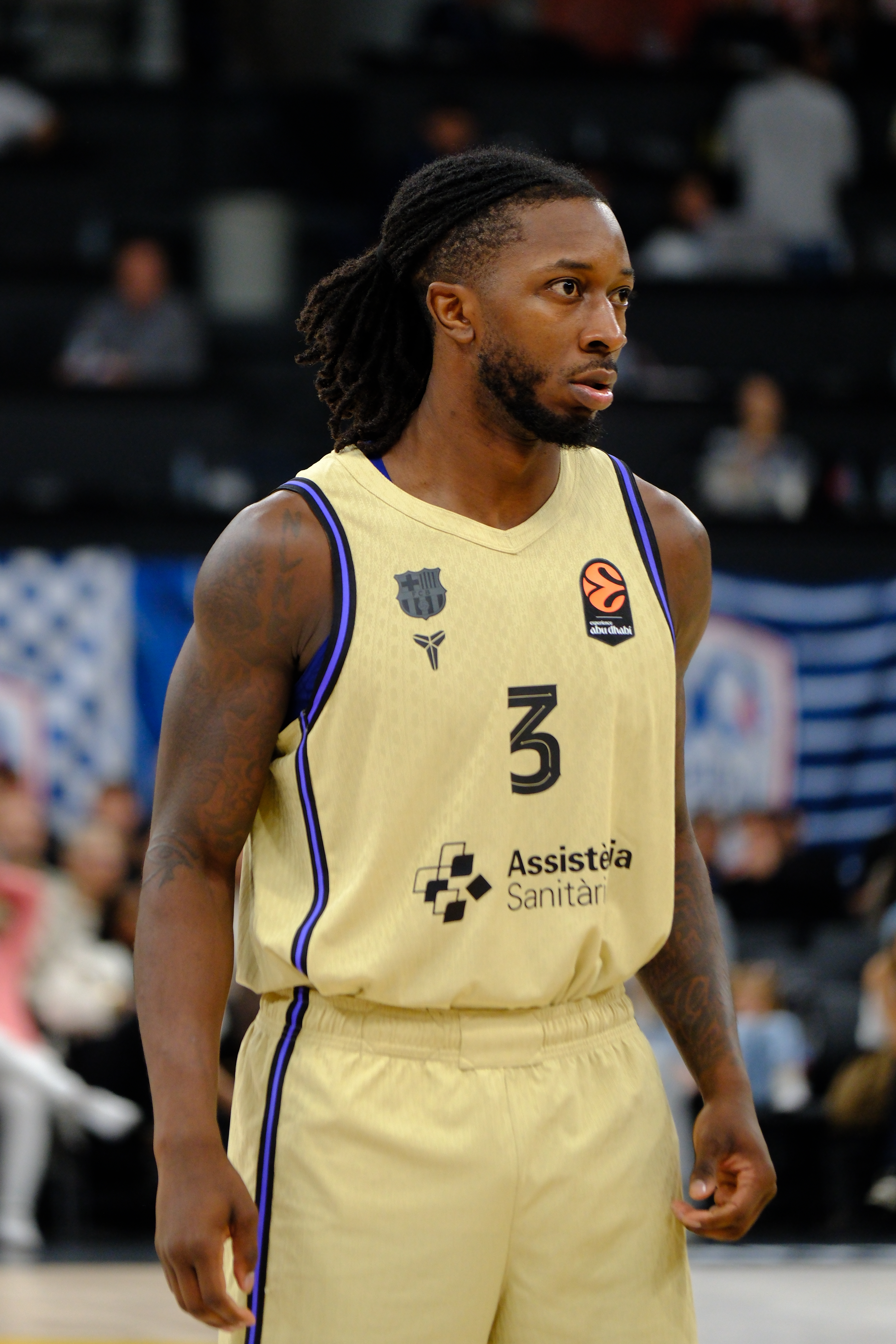
- Cale with FC Barcelona in 2025

No. 0 – ASVEL
- Position: Shooting guard / small forward
- League: LNB Élite; EuroLeague

Personal information
- Born: March 5, 1999 (age 27) Middletown, Delaware, U.S.
- Listed height: 6 ft 6 in (1.98 m)
- Listed weight: 210 lb (95 kg)

Career information
- High school: Appoquinimink (Middletown, Delaware)
- College: Seton Hall (2017–2022)
- NBA draft: 2022: undrafted
- Playing career: 2022–present

Career history
- 2022: Greensboro Swarm
- 2022–2024: Limburg United
- 2024–2025: Aquila Trento
- 2025–2026: FC Barcelona
- 2026–present: ASVEL

Career highlights
- Italian Cup winner (2025); Belgian Cup winner (2024)
Medals
Representing the United States
Pan American Games
Bronze medal – third place	2019 Peru	Team

Myles Alexander Cale (born March 5, 1999) is an American professional basketball player for ASVEL of the French LNB Élite and the EuroLeague. He played college basketball for the Seton Hall Pirates of the Big East Conference. He attended Appoquinimink High School in Middletown, Delaware. Cale is the son of a police officer and founded the “Cale Cares” mentoring program in Middletown, which connects police with local teenagers.

== Early life ==
Cale grew up in Middletown, Delaware, and began playing basketball at the age of six when his father enrolled him in a program at the local Boys and Girls Club. He also played baseball and football but decided to focus on basketball. Cale attended Appoquinimink High School, where he was coached by Steve Wright. As a junior in 2015–16, he averaged 26.4 points, 9.3 rebounds, 2.9 assists and 3.4 steals per game to lead the team to a 13–8 record and a second round berth in the Delaware Interscholastic Athletic Association (DIAA) Tournament. Cale earned First Team All-State honors. He considered transferring to The Patrick School for his senior season, but eventually opted to remain at Appoquinimink. Cale averaged 22 points and 7.5 rebounds per game as a senior and was again named to the First Team All-State. He was considered a four-star recruit ranked 63rd overall and 17th among shooting guards in the Class of 2017 according to ESPN. Cale committed to Seton Hall in November 2016 over offers from Xavier, La Salle, James Madison, Maryland and Temple.

== College career ==
Cale suffered a torn labrum in his shoulder and had surgery prior to his freshman season. In his debut, he scored 12 points and had five rebounds, four assists, and two steals in a win against Fairleigh Dickinson. As a freshman, Cale averaged 4.3 points and 1.6 rebounds per game. He scored 17 points in an 84–83 overtime upset of Kentucky during his sophomore season, and hit the game-winning three-pointer with 9.5 seconds remaining. Cale scored 23 points in a 78–74 upset of Maryland on December 22, 2018. He averaged 10.2 points and 4.1 rebounds per game as a sophomore, helping the team finish 20–14 and reach the 2019 NCAA tournament. Cale's production dipped as a junior due to the offense of Myles Powell and Quincy McKnight, and he stated he did not accomplish what he wanted due to making sacrifices for the team. He averaged six points and 3.7 rebounds per game and made 25 starts. The season was ended prematurely due to the COVID-19 pandemic.

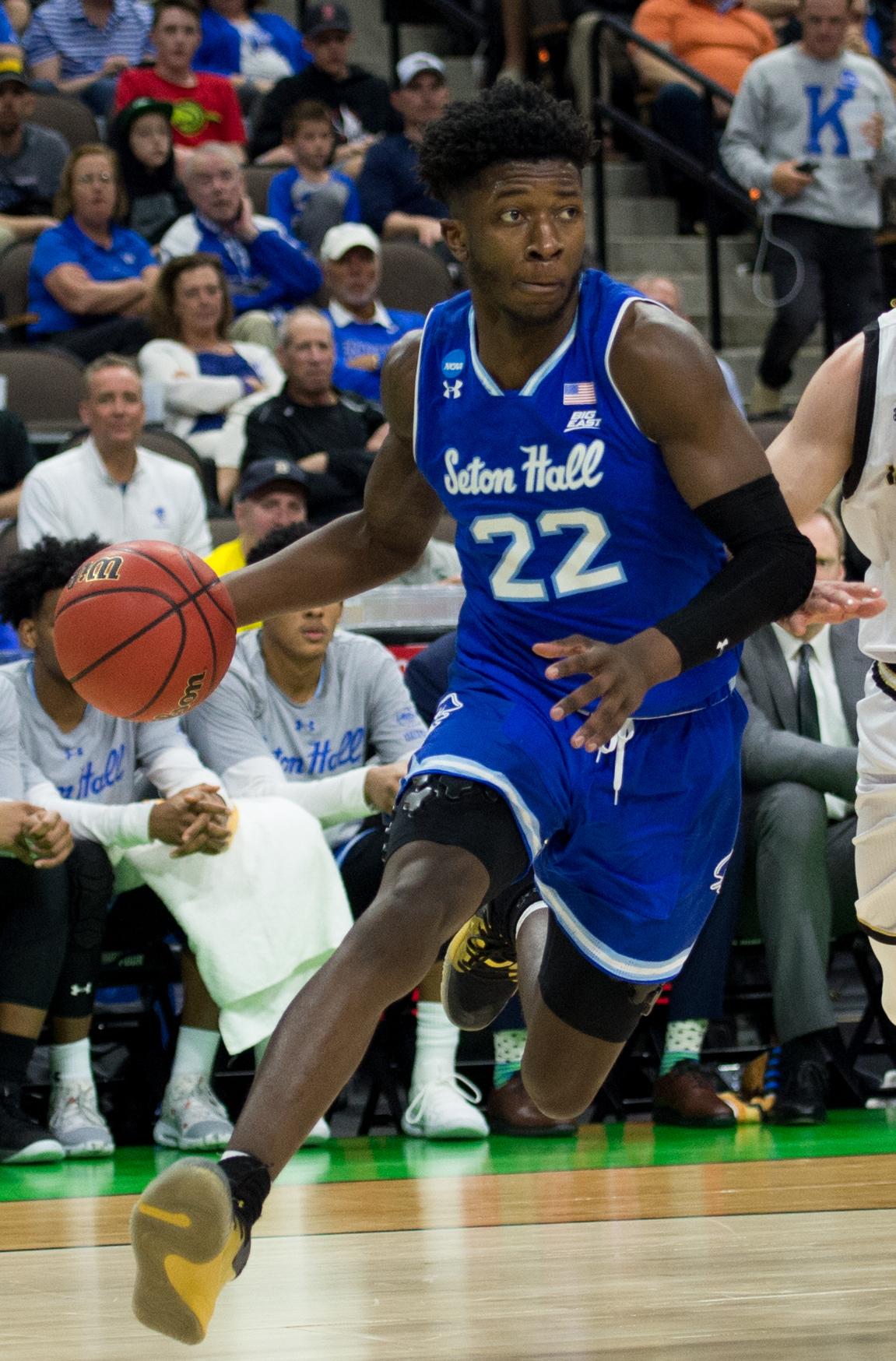
Cale with Seton Hall in 2019

On December 23, 2020, Cale scored a career-high 30 points in a 78–67 win against Georgetown. As a senior, he averaged 11.6 points per game while shooting 44.8 percent. Following the season, Cale announced that he would take advantage of the NCAA's offer of an additional season of eligibility granted due to the COVID-19 pandemic. In his fifth season debut, he passed 1,000 career collegiate points and finished with 15 points, six rebounds and two assists in a 93–49 win against Fairleigh Dickinson. On November 22, 2021, Cale strained his groin during a loss against Ohio State, causing him to miss several games. He returned from the injury on December 4, in a win against Nyack College. As a fifth-year senior, Cale averaged 9.8 points and 3.9 rebounds per game.

== Professional career ==
=== Greensboro Swarm (2022) ===
In November 2022, Cale signed with the Greensboro Swarm of the NBA G League.

=== Limburg United (2022–2024) ===
On December 2, he signed with Limburg United of the BNXT League. During his second season, Cale averaged 16.5 points, 4.8 rebounds, 2.8 assists, and 1.4 steals per game and helped the team win the Belgian Cup.

=== Aquila Trento (2024–2025) ===
On June 16, 2024, he signed with Dolomiti Energia Trento of the Italian Lega Basket Serie A (LBA). He averaged 11.3 points, 3.6 rebounds, and 1.9 assists per game in the Italian league.

=== FC Barcelona (2025–2026) ===
On June 20, 2025, Cale signed a one-year contract with FC Barcelona of the Liga ACB and EuroLeague. On June 30, 2026, Cale left Barcelona upon the expiration of his contract.

=== ASVEL (2026–present) ===
On August 19, 2026, Cale signed with LDLC ASVEL of the French LNB Élite and the EuroLeague.

== National team career ==
Cale represented the United States at the 2019 Pan American Games in Peru. He averaged 3.8 points per game, helping his team win the bronze medal after a 92–83 win over the Dominican Republic in the third-place game.

== Career statistics ==
Legend
GP	Games played	GS	Games started	MPG	Minutes per game
FG%	Field goal percentage	3P%	3-point field goal percentage	FT%	Free throw percentage
RPG	Rebounds per game	APG	Assists per game	SPG	Steals per game
BPG	Blocks per game	PPG	Points per game	**Bold**	Career high

=== Domestic leagues ===
Year	Team	League	GP	MPG	FG%	3P%	FT%	RPG	APG	SPG	BPG	PPG
2022–23	(Belgium) Limburg	BNXT	20	23.8	.483	.441	.667	4.6	1.9	1.1	.4	11.9
2023–24	(Belgium) Limburg	BNXT	30	31.4	.526	.391	.719	4.8	2.8	1.4	.5	16.5
2024–25	(Italy) Trento	LBA	34	25.4	.455	.438	.837	3.6	1.9	1.1	.1	11.2

=== College ===
Year	Team	GP	GS	MPG	FG%	3P%	FT%	RPG	APG	SPG	BPG	PPG
2017–18	Seton Hall	**34**	5	17.2	**.467**	.283	.629	1.6	.6	.6	**.1**	4.3
2018–19	Seton Hall	**34**	**34**	30.1	.411	**.378**	.667	**4.1**	**1.2**	.8	**.1**	10.2
2019–20	Seton Hall	30	25	23.0	.387	.284	.583	3.7	.9	1.0	**.1**	6.0
2020–21	Seton Hall	27	27	**30.9**	.448	.369	**.724**	3.6	.9	1.0	**.1**	**11.6**
2021-22	Seton Hall	29	29	28.9	.422	.359	.625	3.9	1.0	**1.5**	**.1**	9.8
Career		154	120	25.8	.424	.346	.652	3.4	.9	1.0	.1	8.2

== Personal life ==
Cale is the son of George and Shevena Cale. His father is a retired police officer and played basketball for North Carolina A&T, where he was named the Mid-Eastern Athletic Conference Men's Basketball Player of the Year in 1987. His mother is a school administrator in the Christiana School District and played basketball at Howard. Cale has an older sister, Amber, who played basketball at Lincoln University. Cale participated in the George Floyd protests in Delaware and gave a speech at a rally. He founded the “Cale Cares” mentoring program in Middletown, connecting police with local teenagers. Cale graduated from Seton Hall in 2021, with a degree in social behavioral sciences.
