= List of Pro Basketball League season blocks leaders =

The Basketball League Belgium Division I blocks title is awarded to the player with the highest blocks per game average in a given regular season of the Basketball League Belgium Division I.

== Leaders ==
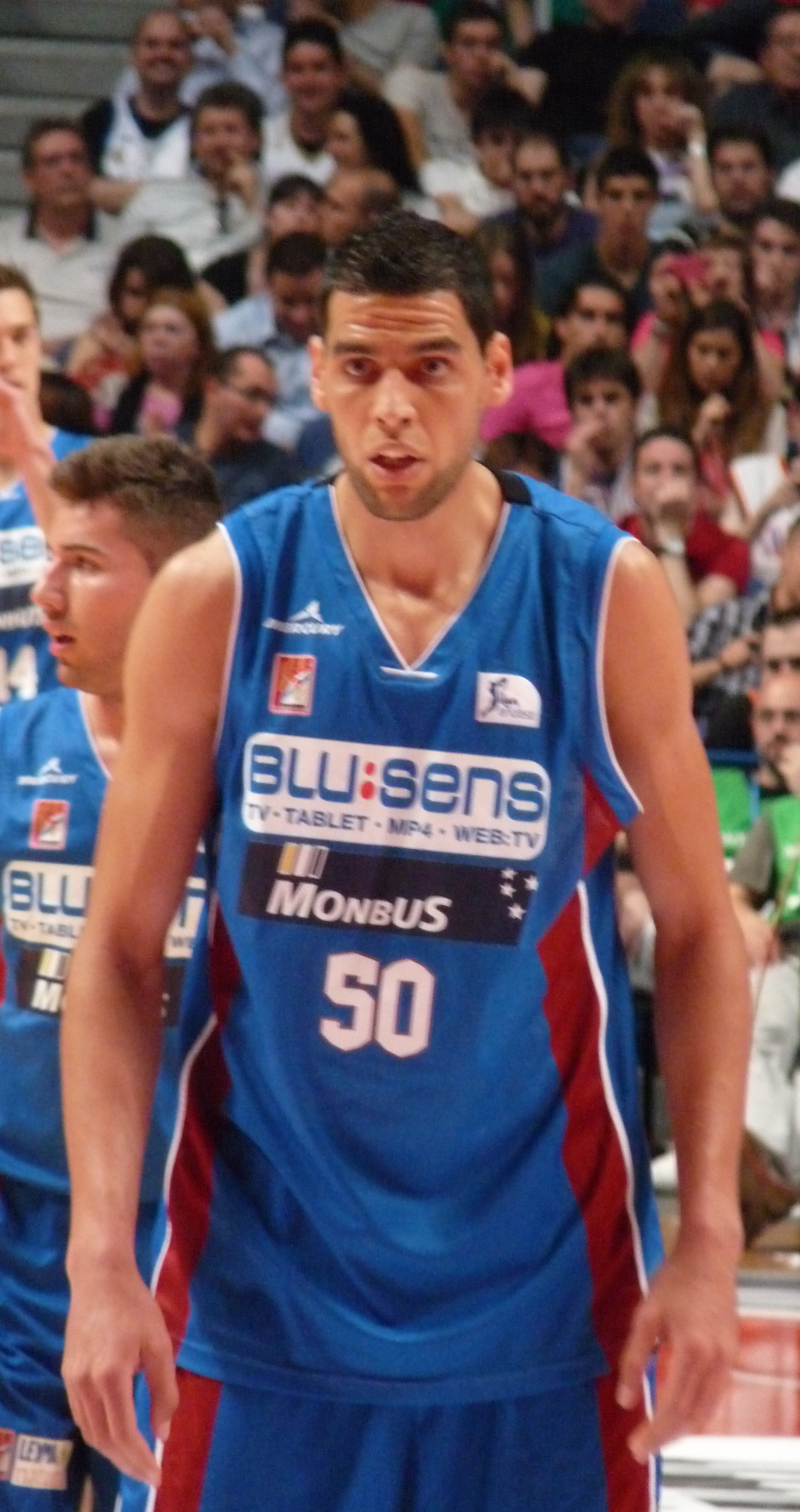
Salah Mejri led the league two consecutive years: in 2011 and 2012

Season	Player	Team	BPG
2007–08	(United States) D'or Fischer	Euphony Bree	2.8
2008–09	(United States) Matt Haryasz	Oostende	1.4
2009–10	(United States) Andre Riddick	Spirou Charleroi	1.5
2010–11	(Tunisia) Salah Mejri	Antwerp Giants	1.6
2011–12	(Tunisia) Salah Mejri (2×)	Antwerp Giants	2.5
2012–13	(United States) Andre Riddick (2×)	Spirou Charleroi	1.1
2013–14	(Belgium) Kevin Tumba	Leuven Bears	1.7
2014–15	(Belgium) Kevin Tumba (2×)	Leuven Bears	1.6
2015–16	(United States) Julian Gamble	Excelsior Brussels	1.9
2016–17	(United States) Bill Amis	Okapi Aalstar	1.5
2017–18	(United States) Gerald Beverly	Liège Basket	1.6
2018–19	(Senegal) Ibrahima Fall Faye	Leuven Bears	1.5
2019–20	(Netherlands) Jito Kok	Kangoeroes Mechelen	2.0
