= Coosemans =

Coosemans is a Flemish surname.

Notable people with this surname include:

- Alexander Coosemans (1627–1689), Flemish painter
- Colin Coosemans (born 1992), Belgian football player
- Henri Coosemans (born 1922), Belgian basketball player
- Joseph Coosemans (1828–1904), Belgian landscape painter
