= Joann Lõssov =

Estonian basketball player

- Joann Lõssov during basketball game

Personal information
- Born: 10 September 1921 Tallinn, Estonia
- Died: 3 August 2000 (aged 78) Tallinn, Estonia
- Height: 174 cm (5 ft 9 in)

Sport
- Position: Point guard
Medal record
Representing Soviet Union
Men's basketball
Olympic Games
Silver medal – second place	1952 Helsinki	Team
EuroBasket
Gold medal – first place	1947 Prague	USSR
Gold medal – first place	1951 Paris	USSR

Joann Lõssov (10 September 1921 – 3 August 2000), also known as Ioann Fyodorovich Lysov (Russian: Иоанн Фёдорович Лысов), was an Estonian basketball player. Lõssov trained at VSS Kalev, in Tallinn. He was named MVP of the 1947 EuroBasket. Member of the Soviet Union basketball team in 1947–52, from 1949, the captain and points guard. After his career as a player, worked as the head coach of the Soviet Union women's team in 1953–58 (gold medals from the European Championships of 1954 and 1956) and helped to organise special trainings of the Soviet Union team. Elected to the Hall of fame of Estonian basketball in 2010.

== Club career ==
Lõssov's career started in 1936. He played for the teams of the YMCA and Russ before the war. After the war he played in Tallinna Kalev. With the team of the University of Tartu he won a gold medal (1949) and a silver medal (1950) of Soviet Union League Championship.

== National team career ==
Lõssov played with the senior Soviet Union men's national basketball team at the 1952 Summer Olympics, where he won a silver medal. He played in all eight of the Soviet Union's games.

== Achievements ==
=== National team ===
- Olympic Games: 1952
- European Championships: 1947, 1951

=== Club ===
- Soviet Union League Championship: 1949
- Estonian SSR Championship: 1944–1947, 1955

== Orders ==
Order of the White Star, 5th Class: 1998
