= Eddy Casteels =

Belgian basketball player and coach

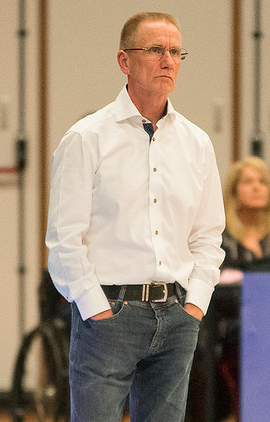

Personal information
- Born: 19 August 1960 (age 66) Mechelen
- Listed height: 6 ft 3 in (1.91 m)
- Listed weight: 187 lb (85 kg)
- Position: Head coach
- Coaching career: 1999–present

Career history

Coaching
- 1988–1995: Racing Mechelen (assistant)
- 1995–1996: Racing Basket Antwerp (assistant)
- 1996–2000: Racing Basket Antwerp
- 2000–2001: Athlon Ieper
- 2001–2004: Oostende
- 2004–2006: Verviers-Pepinster
- 2006–2008: Spirou
- 2008–2013: Antwerp Giants
- 2014–2016: ZZ Leiden
- 2005–2018: Belgium
- 2018–2024: Leuven Bears
- 2024–2025: Okapi Aalst

Career highlights
- 3x Belgian League champion (2000, 2002, 2008); Belgian Cup champion (2000); 3x BLB Coach of the Year (2000, 2002, 2009)

Eduard "Eddy" Casteels (born 19 August 1960) is a Belgian professional basketball coach and former player. He was most recently the head coach for Okapi Aalst of the BNXT League. From 2005 till 2018 he was the head coach of the Belgium national basketball team

He is also the author of the book Zo De Coach, Zo Het Team.

== Career ==
Mechelen born Casteels has coached several Belgian teams over a long period, as well as one team in the Netherlands in ZZ Leiden. He was named Coach of the Year of the Belgian League three times, as he won the award in 2000, 2002 and 2009.

He served as an assistant coach at Racing Mechelen from 1988 to 1995. In 1995, he joined the newly merged Racing Basket Antwerpen project. Casteels was promoted from assistant coach to the head coaching position in January 1996. He won the Belgian league with his team in 1999-2000. In the 2000–01 season, Casteels coached Ieper. The Belgian club Athlon Ieper closed down after this season due to financial difficulties. Casteels became winner of the Belgian league with BC Oostende in his first year as head coach of the club. He also won the Belgian Cup in 2002 with Oostende. In 2004 he participated in the FIBA Europe League with his team. In 2004, Casteels became the head coach of Verviers-Pepinster. During his period as head coach of RBC Verviers-Pepinster, Casteels coached his team in the FIBA Europe League in 2005. With the club Spirou Charleroi, Casteels coached in the 2007 EuroCup. In 2008, Casteels signed with the Antwerp Giants. Casteels coached the Antwerp Giants for 4 seasons in a row to the EuroChallenge. On 30 May 2014, Casteels signed a 2-year contract with Dutch team ZZ Leiden of the Dutch Basketball League (DBL).

On 8 January 2018, Casteels signed with Leuven Bears.

On 31 May 2024, Casteels signed with Okapi Aalst.

== Belgian national team ==
Casteels qualified the Belgian Lions towards to four consecutive participations of EuroBasket in 2011, 2013, 2015. and 2017.

== Honours ==
- Belgian Championship: 2000, 2002, 2008
- Belgian Cup: 2000

Individual awards:

- BLB Coach of the Year: 2000, 2002, 2009
