= Hassan Sayed Moawad =

Egyptian basketball player

Personal information
- Nationality: Egyptian
- Born: Cairo, Egypt
- Died: December 2007

Sport
- Sport: Basketball
Medal record
Men's basketball
Representing Egypt
EuroBasket
Bronze medal – third place	1947 Prague

Hassan Sayed Moawad (Arabic: حسن سيد معوض; died December 2007) was an Egyptian basketball player. He competed in the men's tournament at the 1948 Summer Olympics.
