= Brian Lynch (basketball) =

American basketball player and coach

Personal information
- Born: June 12, 1978 (age 48) Point Pleasant, New Jersey
- Listed height: 6 ft 6 in (1.98 m)

Career information
- High school: Christian Brothers Academy (Lincroft, New Jersey)
- College: Villanova (1996–2000)
- Playing career: 2000–2009
- Position: Shooting guard / small forward
- Coaching career: 2013–present

Career history

Playing
- 2000–2001: Spójnia Stargard
- 2001: Bnei Herzliya
- 2001–2002: Aveiro Basket
- 2002–2003: Panionios
- 2003: Avitos Gießen
- 2003: Stayer Reggio Calabria
- 2003: Eurorida Scafati
- 2003: Paris Basket Racing
- 2003–2004: Avitos Giessen
- 2004–2008: Euphony Bree
- 2008–2009: Antwerp Giants

Coaching
- 2013–2014: Antwerp Giants (assistant)
- 2014–2017: Limburg United
- 2017–2019: Spirou
- 2019–2020: Limburg United

Career highlights
- As coach: Belgian League Coach of the Year (2015)

Brian Robert Lynch (born June 12, 1978) is an American former professional basketball player and current coach.

== Early life ==
Lynch was born in Point Pleasant, New Jersey to Mary and Richard Lynch, a now-retired Belmar, New Jersey police chief. Lynch is of Irish descent. He grew up in Belmar, New Jersey and went to high school at Christian Brothers Academy. He played college basketball at Villanova University, scoring 992 points.

=== High school career ===
Lynch attended Christian Brothers Academy (CBA) in Lincroft, New Jersey, where he played under head coach Ed Wicelinski and helped lead the Colts to statewide prominence. As a senior during the 1994–95 season, Lynch was named to the All-State First Team by multiple New Jersey media outlets, averaging over 20 points per game.

In his junior year, Lynch played a pivotal role in CBA’s Non-Public A state championship run, finishing with a team-best scoring average and earning All-Shore recognition. His performances drew interest from several Division I programs, ultimately leading him to commit to Villanova University.

Lynch's success at CBA contributed to the school's strong basketball tradition and earned him a reputation as one of the top high school players in New Jersey during the mid-1990s.

== College career ==
Lynch played four seasons of NCAA Division I basketball at Villanova University from 1996 to 2000 under head coach Steve Lappas. He appeared in 117 games, starting 64, and averaged 8.5 points and 3.1 rebounds per game over his collegiate career. Lynch finished with 992 career points, just shy of the 1,000-point milestone.

As a junior during the 1998–99 season, Lynch started all 32 games and averaged a career-best 10.4 points per game. He led the Big East Conference in three-point field goal percentage that season, shooting 41.4% from beyond the arc.

In his senior year (1999–2000), Lynch served as team captain. During his tenure, Villanova made NCAA Tournament appearances in 1997 and 1999.

In the summer of 1999, Lynch was selected to join the Nike NIT All-Stars for a European tour, playing games in Austria and the Czech Republic.

== Career ==
After graduating from Villanova University in 2000, Lynch began a professional basketball career in Europe. Over the next several years, he played for teams in Poland, Israel, Portugal, Greece, Germany, Italy, France, and Belgium. In 2004, he signed with Euphony Bree, where he played until 2008. During his tenure, Bree captured the Pro Basketball League championship in 2005. Lynch finished his playing career with the Antwerp Giants during the 2008–09 season.

In 2013, Lynch transitioned into coaching as an assistant with the Antwerp Giants. In March 2014, he was appointed head coach of the newly established club Limburg United, signing a five-year contract. Under Lynch’s leadership, the team reached the Belgian Cup final in the 2016–17 season. He was named Belgian League Coach of the Year in 2015.

On June 6, 2017, Lynch was hired as head coach of Spirou Charleroi for the 2017–18 season. He was dismissed from the position on November 25, 2018. Lynch returned to Limburg United for the 2018–19 season but stepped down in March 2020.

In 2021, Lynch returned to the United States and became head boys’ basketball coach at St. Rose High School in Belmar, New Jersey. During his tenure, he led the team to multiple Shore Conference titles and state tournament appearances. In May 2025, he was named the new head coach at Christian Brothers Academy, his alma mater in Lincroft, New Jersey.

== Personal life ==
Lynch is married to Belgian tennis star Kim Clijsters. The couple wed in a private civil ceremony at 6:00 a.m. on July 13, 2007, at the town hall in Bree, Belgium. The early-morning event was attended only by their parents and siblings, allowing them to avoid media attention. The ceremony was officiated by Bree's mayor, Jaak Gabriels.

The couple has three children. Their daughter, Jada Elle Lynch, was born on February 27, 2008. Their first son, Jack Leon Lynch, was born on September 18, 2013, followed by their second son, Blake Richard Lynch, born in October 2016.

The family divides their time between Belgium and the United States. They spend autumns in Bree, Belgium, where their children attend school, and summers in Wall Township, New Jersey, where they own a home purchased in 2009.
