= Dario Gjergja =

Croatian basketball coach (born 1975)

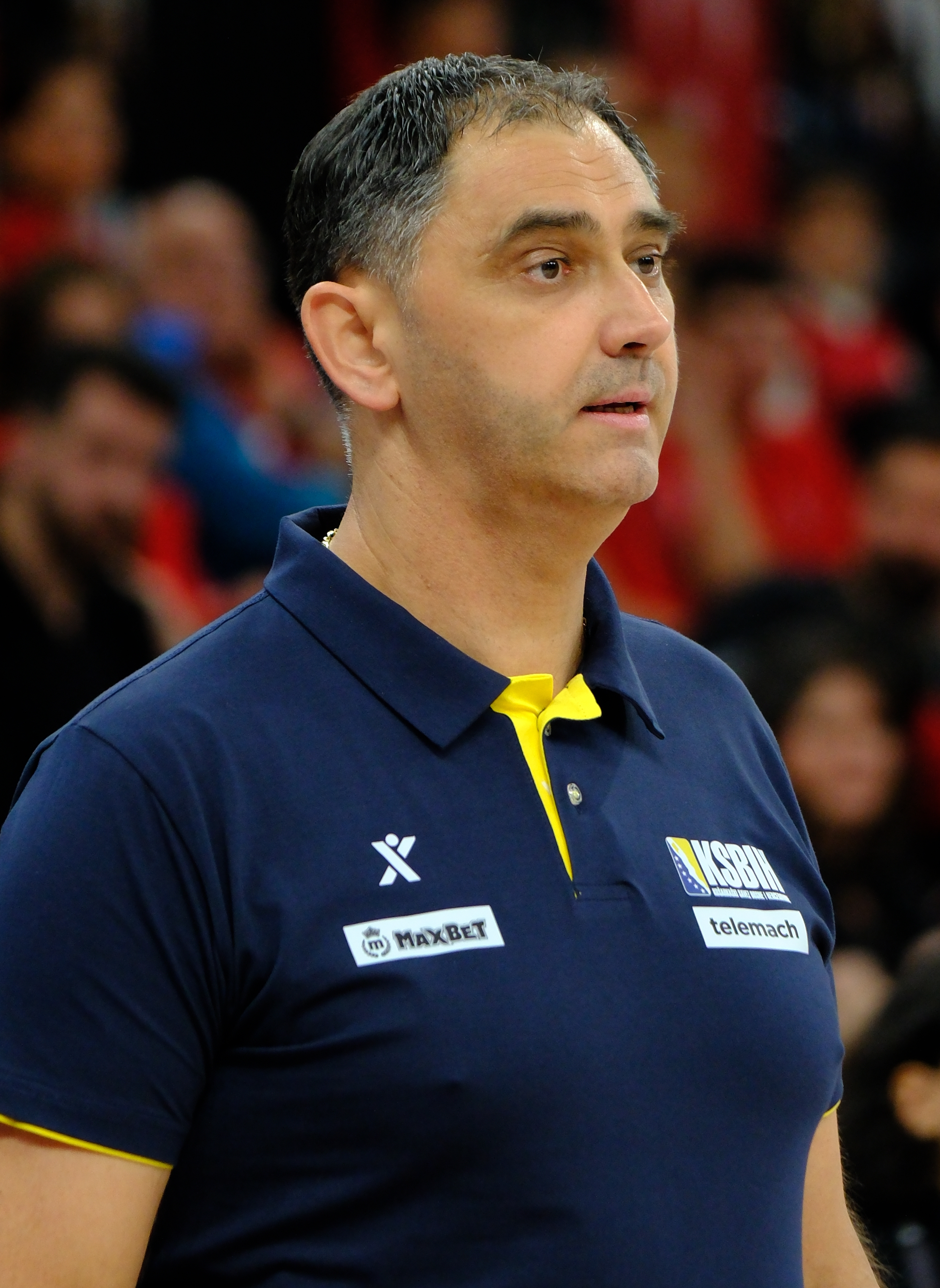
- Gjergja with Bosnia and Herzegovina in 2025

Bosna
- Position: Head coach
- League: Bosnian League; ABA League

Personal information
- Born: 21 August 1975 (age 51) Zadar, SR Croatia, SFR Yugoslavia
- Coaching career: 2001–present

Career history

Coaching
- 2001–2003: Zagreb (assistant)
- 2003–2007: Cibona VIP (assistant)
- 2007–2008: Ural Great Perm (assistant)
- 2008–2009: Spirou Charleroi (assistant)
- 2009–2011: Liège
- 2011–2025: Oostende
- 2015: Croatia (assistant)
- 2018–2025: Belgium
- 2025–2026: Limoges CSP
- 2025–: Bosnia and Herzegovina
- 2026–: Bosna

Career highlights
- As head coach: 14× Belgian League champion (2012–2025); 8× Belgian Cup winner (2013–2018, 2021, 2025); 4× Belgian Supercup winner (2014, 2015, 2017, 2018); 3× BNXT Supercup winner (2021, 2022, 2023); 3× Belgian League Coach of the Year (2013, 2017, 2018); BNXT Belgian Coach of the Year (2024); As assistant coach: 3× Croatian League champion (2004, 2006, 2007); Belgian League champion (2009)

Dario Gjergja (also transliterated Đerđa; born 21 August 1975) is a Croatian professional basketball coach who currently serves as the head coach for Bosna of the Bosnian League and the ABA League. He is also the head coach of the Bosnia and Herzegovina national team.

== Club coaching ==
After working as an assistant at Zagreb, Cibona VIP, Ural Great Perm and Spirou Charleroi, Gjergja was appointed head coach of Liège in 2009, working at the club until 2011.

Gjergja signed with Oostende in December 2011. He was named the Coach of the Year in Belgium for the 2012–13 season. In May 2014, he extended his contract for three more years. In February 2017, Gjergja extended his contract with Oostende for another four years. He decided to step away from Oostende on 7 June 2025, after winning his 14th Belgian Championship in fourteen years of coaching the club.

On 11 June 2025, Gjergja signed with Limoges CSP of the French LNB Élite. In July 2026, he joined Bosnian side KK Bosna of the ABA League on a three-year deal.

== National team coaching career ==
Gjergja served as an assistant coach of the Croatia national team during EuroBasket 2015, under head coach Velimir Perasović. In September 2018, Gjergja was named the head coach of the Belgium national team. He managed to qualify Belgium to two consecutive EuroBaskets in 2022 and 2025.

In November 2025, Gjergja was appointed head coach of the Bosnia and Herzegovina national team, replacing Adis Bećiragić.

== Personal life ==
Gjergja gained Belgian citizenship in 2018 during his time coaching in Belgium. His father, Josip, was a professional basketball player and coach as well, leading Croatia to a third place finish at the 1994 FIBA World Championship.
