= Roman Penn =

American basketball player

- Penn with Igokea m:tel in 2026

No. 13 – Igokea
- Position: Point guard
- League: Bosnian League; ABA League; Basketball Champions League

Personal information
- Born: September 1, 1997 (age 29) Seattle, Washington, U.S.
- Listed height: 6 ft 0 in (1.83 m)
- Listed weight: 185 lb (84 kg)

Career information
- High school: Bishop Noll (Hammond, Indiana); Don Bosco Prep (Crown Point, Indiana)
- College: Siena (2017–2018); Drake (2019–2023)
- NBA draft: 2023: undrafted
- Playing career: 2023–present

Career history
- 2023–2024: Limburg United
- 2024–2026: Rapid București
- 2026–present: Igokea

Career highlights
- Belgian Cup MVP (2024); Belgian Cup winner (2024); 2× First-team All-MVC (2021, 2023); 2× Third-team All-MVC (2020, 2022); MVC All-Newcomer Team (2020)

Roman Allen Kalahaehae Penn (born September 1, 1997) is an American professional basketball player for Igokea of the Bosnian League and the ABA League and Basketball Champions League (BCL). He played college basketball for the Siena Saints and Drake Bulldogs.

== High school career ==
Penn attended Bishop Noll Institute in Hammond, Indiana, winning one regional and three sectional titles. As a senior, he averaged 15.5 points, 6.1 rebounds and 3.1 assists per game. Penn, who stood 5 ft 10 in (1.78 m), did not receive offers from any NCAA Division I programs due to his size, and opted to attend Don Bosco Prep in Crown Point, Indiana. After one semester, he committed to playing college basketball for Siena after being recruited by assistant coach Jordan Watson.

== College career ==
Penn enrolled early at Siena, practicing and working on the scout team during his first semester. He entered the starting lineup as a freshman. On November 25, 2017, Penn recorded 14 points and a season-high 11 assists in an 85–76 win over Hofstra. He missed his final nine games with a stress fracture and a cyst in his heel and underwent surgery. Penn averaged 9.7 points, 4.9 rebounds and three assists per game. Following the season, he was released from his scholarship with the departure of head coach Jimmy Patsos.

Penn transferred to Drake, choosing the Bulldogs over Northern Illinois, Kent State and Wright State. He sat out for his next year due to NCAA transfer rules. On March 6, 2020, at the MVC tournament quarterfinals, Penn recorded a sophomore season-high 26 points, eight rebounds and eight assists, leading his team to an upset win over first-seeded Northern Iowa, 77–56. As a sophomore, he averaged 12 points, an MVC-leading 5.6 assists and 4.7 rebounds per game. He earned Third Team All-MVC and All-Newcomer Team honors. On December 18, 2020, Penn scored a junior season-high 25 points in a 75–57 win over South Dakota. He suffered a season-ending broken foot against Evansville on February 21. As a junior, Penn averaged 11.2 points and an MVC-best 5.5 assists per game. On December 5, 2021, he was ruled out indefinitely after reinjuring his foot. Penn returned to game action on January 2, 2022, after missing seven games. He averaged 11.1 points and 3.9 assists per game as a senior, setting the Drake record for assists. He earned Third Team All-MVC honors at the conclusion of the regular season. Penn repeated on the First Team All-MVC in 2022-23 and received votes for Player of the Year, though the honor ultimately was earned by teammate Tucker DeVries.

== Professional career ==
On June 28, 2023, Penn signed with Limburg United of the BNXT League.

On August 14, 2024, he signed with Rapid București of the Liga Națională.

On June 24, 2026, he signed with Igokea of the Bosnian League and the ABA League.

== Career statistics ==
Legend
GP	Games played	GS	Games started	MPG	Minutes per game
FG%	Field goal percentage	3P%	3-point field goal percentage	FT%	Free throw percentage
RPG	Rebounds per game	APG	Assists per game	SPG	Steals per game
BPG	Blocks per game	PPG	Points per game	**Bold**	Career high

=== College ===
Year	Team	GP	GS	MPG	FG%	3P%	FT%	RPG	APG	SPG	BPG	PPG
2017–18	Siena	23	19	**32.3**	.409	.338	**.833**	**4.9**	3.0	1.3	**.2**	9.7
2018–19	Drake	Redshirt										
2019–20	Drake	**34**	**34**	30.6	**.495**	**.403**	.788	4.7	**5.6**	1.3	.0	**12.0**
2020–21	Drake	24	24	26.8	.452	.333	.702	3.3	5.5	**1.4**	.0	11.2
Career		81	77	29.9	.461	.360	.782	4.3	4.8	1.3	.1	11.1
