= Zorko Cvetković =

Croatian electrical engineer and basketball player/coach

- Born: 24 September 1924; Osijek, Kingdom of Serbs, Croats and Slovenes
- Died: 13 December 2017 (aged 93); Zagreb, Croatia
- Education: University of Zagreb
- Spouse: Lijerka Radoničić (m. 1949)
- Engineering career
- Institutions: CIGRÉ
- Employers: Elektrana Zagreb (1950–1955); Elektroprijenos Zagreb (1957–1990)
- Awards: CIGRÉ Distinguished Member (2000)
- Basketball career
- Position: Shooting guard
- Number: 13

Zorko Cvetković (September 4, 1924 – December 13, 2017) was a Croatian electrical engineer and basketball player and coach. He represented the Yugoslavia national basketball team internationally.

== Engineering career ==
Cvetković graduated from the Faculty of Electrical Engineering at the University of Zagreb in 1950, and later obtained a doctorate in 1983.

From 1947 to 1994, he was an external associate at the Department of High Voltage and Power of the Faculty of Electrical Engineering, University of Zagreb.

He was a secretary-general of the CIGRÉ branch in Croatia from 1989 to 2004.

== Basketball career ==
After the end of Second World War in 1945, Cvetković started to play basketball. He was a member of the Yugoslavia national team which participated at the 1947 FIBA European Championship. After retirement, he was a coach, a referee and the president of Mladost Zagreb.
