= Désiré Ligon =

Belgian basketball player (1931–2018)

Personal information
- Nationality: Belgian
- Born: 12 March 1931; Brussels, Belgium
- Died: 4 February 2018 (aged 86); Brussels, Belgium

Sport
- Sport: Basketball

Désiré Justin L. Ligon (12 March 1931 – 4 February 2018) was a Belgian basketball player. He competed in the men's tournament at the 1952 Summer Olympics. Ligon died on 4 February 2018, at the age of 86.
