= Sanex =

Brand of personal care products owned by Colgate-Palmolive

- Product type: Personal care
- Current owner: Colgate-Palmolive (2011–present)
- Produced by: Colgate-Pamolive Europe
- Country: Origin: Spain marketing and production: various.
- Introduced: 1984
- Markets: Europe and international
- Previous owners: Sara Lee Corporation (until 2009); Unilever (2009–2011)
- Tagline: Keep Skin Healthy
- Website: Official website

Sanex is a brand of personal care products owned by Colgate-Palmolive. It is sold in multiple European countries (including the United Kingdom, Ireland, the Netherlands, Belgium, France, Spain, Portugal, Denmark, Norway, Greece, Poland and Croatia) and in South Africa.

== History ==
The Sanex brand was introduced by Sara Lee Corporation in 1984 with the launch of Sanex Shower Gel, a pioneer non-soap body cleanser. It was first introduced in Spain and subsequently expanded into other European markets, becoming the company's best-selling household and body care brand.

Unilever acquired Sanex in 2009 as part of its purchase of the personal care division of Sara Lee Corporation. The European Commission required the brand's divestment on anti-trust grounds, and in 2011 it was sold to Colgate-Palmolive for £580 million (approximately $940 million in US dollars). Its sales in 2010 were €187 million ($265 million).

== Products ==
Product lines include deodorant, shower gel, liquid hand soap and body, face and hand moisturisers.

== Controversy ==
On August 19, 2025, a TV advert for Sanex shower gel which showed cracked black skin and smooth white skin was banned in the United Kingdom by the Advertising Standards Authority for reinforcing a racial stereotype.
