= Alexis Van Gils =

Belgian basketball player (1926–2019)

Personal information
- Full name: Alexis François J. Van Gils
- Nationality: Belgian
- Born: 10 October 1926
- Died: 7 January 2019 (aged 92) Saint-Josse-ten-Noode, Belgium

Sport
- Sport: Basketball

Alexis François J. Van Gils (10 October 1926 – 7 January 2019) was a Belgian basketball player. He competed in the men's tournament at the 1952 Summer Olympics. Van Gils died in Saint-Josse-ten-Noode on 7 January 2019, at the age of 92.
