= Kevin Tumba =

Belgian basketball player (born 1991)

No. 24 – Windrose Giants Antwerp
- Position: Center
- League: BNXT League

Personal information
- Born: February 23, 1991 (age 35) Lubumbashi, DR Congo
- Listed height: 6 ft 9 in (2.06 m)
- Listed weight: 245 lb (111 kg)

Career information
- NBA draft: 2013: undrafted
- Playing career: 2011–present

Career history
- 2011–2013: Belfius Mons-Hainaut
- 2013–2015: Leuven Bears
- 2015–2017: Spirou Charleroi
- 2017–2020: UCAM Murcia
- 2020–2021: Kolossos Rodou
- 2021–2022: Fos Provence Basket
- 2022: Ionikos Nikaias
- 2022: Circus Brussels
- 2022–2024: Liège Basket
- 2024–present: Antwerp Giants

Career highlights
- Belgian League champion (2025–26); Belgian Cup champion (2026); 2× BLB blocks leader (2014, 2015)

Kevin Tumba (born February 23, 1991) is a Congolese-Belgian professional basketball player for Antwerp Giants of the BNXT League. He usually plays at the center position. Born in the DR Congo, he plays for Belgium internationally.

== Professional career ==
Tumba made his professional debut in the 2011–12 season with Belfius Mons-Hainaut. He signed a new 2-year contract in May 2014.

In June 2015, Tumba signed a 2-year contract with Belgian EuroCup team Proximus Spirou Charleroi.

On January 20, 2017, Tumba transferred to Spanish Liga ACB side UCAM Murcia, where he signed a contract until the end of the season.

On August 15, 2020, Tumba moved to Greece and signed with Kolossos Rodou. On January 15, 2021, Tumba was released from the Greek club after suffering a serious injury. He averaged 4.0 points, 4.8 rebounds, and 1.1 blocks per game.

On December 14, 2021, Tumba signed with Fos Provence Basket of the LNB Pro A.

On April 19, 2022, Tumba returned to Greece for Ionikos Nikaias. In 4 league games, he averaged 4.7 points and 5.5 rebounds, playing around 15 minutes per contest.

On June 16, 2022, he has signed with Circus Brussels of the BNXT League.

On December 29, 2022, he signed with Liège Basket of the BNXT League.

On June 7, 2024, he signed with Antwerp Giants of the BNXT League.

== International career ==
Tumba represented the senior men's Belgian national basketball team at the EuroBasket 2015, where they lost to Greece in the round of 16, by a score of 54–75.
