= Ange Hollanders =

Belgian basketball player (1926–2009)

Personal information
- Full name: Ange Alexandre Hollanders
- Nationality: Belgian
- Born: 29 March 1926 Brussels, Belgium
- Died: 5 February 2019 (aged 92) Brussels, Belgium

Sport
- Sport: Basketball

Ange Alexandre Hollanders (29 March 1926 – 5 February 2019) was a Belgian basketball player. He competed in the men's tournament at the 1948 Summer Olympics.

Hollanders died in Brussels in 2019. He was the brother of fellow Olympic basketball player Henri Hollanders.
