= Georges Baert =

Belgian basketball player

Personal information
- Nationality: Belgian
- Born: 4 June 1926; Ledeberg, Belgium
- Died: 5 October 2017 (aged 91)

Sport
- Sport: Basketball

Georges Baert (4 June 1926 – 5 October 2017) was a Belgian basketball player. He competed in the men's tournament at the 1948 Summer Olympics.
