= Émile Kets =

Belgian basketball player

Personal information
- Nationality: Belgian
- Born: 8 December 1923; Geraardsbergen, Belgium
- Died: 20 July 2012 (aged 88)

Sport
- Sport: Basketball

Émile Kets (8 December 1923 – 20 July 2012) was a Belgian basketball player. He competed in the men's tournament at the 1948 Summer Olympics.
