= Armand Van Wambeke =

Belgian basketball player (1926–2011)

Personal information
- Nationality: Belgian
- Born: 16 May 1926 Ghent, Belgium
- Died: 3 May 2011 (aged 84) Ithaca, New York, U.S.

Sport
- Sport: Basketball

Armand Van Wambeke (16 May 1926 – 3 May 2011) was a Belgian basketball player. He competed in the men's tournament at the 1948 Summer Olympics.
