= Julien Meuris =

Belgian basketball player (1922–2005)

Personal information
- Full name: Julien Joseph Meuris
- Nationality: Belgian
- Born: 21 March 1922 Ixelles, Belgium
- Died: 18 April 2005 (aged 83) Anderlecht, Belgium

Sport
- Sport: Basketball

Julien Joseph Meuris (21 March 1922 – 18 April 2005) was a Belgian basketball player. He competed in the men's tournament at the 1948 Summer Olympics and the 1952 Summer Olympics. Meuris died in Anderlecht on 18 April 2005, at the age of 83.
