= Gustave Poppe =

Belgian basketball player

Personal information
- Nationality: Belgian
- Born: 21 August 1924; Etterbeek, Belgium

Sport
- Sport: Basketball

Gustave Poppe (born 21 August 1924) was a Belgian basketball player. He competed in the men's tournament at the 1948 Summer Olympics.
