= Henri Hermans =

Belgian basketball player

Personal information
- Nationality: Belgian
- Born: 3 March 1919; Molenbeek-Saint-Jean, Belgium

Sport
- Sport: Basketball

Henri Hermans (born 3 March 1919, date of death unknown) was a Belgian basketball player. He competed in the men's tournament at the 1948 Summer Olympics.
