= François De Pauw =

Belgian basketball player

Personal information
- Nationality: Belgian
- Born: 28 December 1926; Uccle, Belgium
- Died: 21 February 2009 (aged 82)

Sport
- Sport: Basketball

François De Pauw (28 December 1926 – 21 February 2009) was a Belgian basketball player. He competed in the men's tournament at the 1948 Summer Olympics.
