= René Steurbaut =

Belgian basketball player (1928–2019)

Personal information
- Nationality: Belgian
- Born: 26 June 1928 Ghent, Belgium
- Died: 6 January 2019 (aged 90) Ostend, Belgium

Sport
- Sport: Basketball

René Steurbaut (26 June 1928 – 6 January 2019) was a Belgian basketball player. He competed in the men's tournament at the 1948 Summer Olympics.
