= Henri Hollanders =

Belgian basketball player

Personal information
- Full name: Henri Jean Hollanders
- Nationality: Belgian
- Born: 9 November 1922 Brussels, Belgium
- Died: 24 June 1995 (aged 72)

Sport
- Sport: Basketball

Henri Jean Hollanders (9 November 1922 – 24 June 1995) was a Belgian basketball player. He competed in the men's tournament at the 1948 Summer Olympics.

Hollanders was the brother of fellow Olympic basketball player Ange Hollanders.
