= Limburg United =

Hubo Limburg United
- Leagues: BNXT League
- Founded: 2014; 12 years ago
- History: Limburg United (2014–present)
- Arena: Sporthal Alverberg
- Capacity: 2,012
- Location: Hasselt, Limburg, Belgium
- Team colors: Red, Blue, White
- Main sponsor: Hubo
- President: Maarten Bostyn
- Team manager: Danny Marguillier
- Head coach: Raymond Westphalen
- Team captain: Wout Leemans
- Championships: 2 Belgian Cup
- Website: limburgunited.be
Home	Away	Third

Limburg United, for sponsorship reasons named Hubo Limburg United, is a professional basketball club based in Hasselt, Limburg, Belgium.

Founded in 2014, the club plays in the BNXT League, the first tier of basketball in Belgium. The team plays its home games in Sporthal Alverberg. Limburg has won one trophy, the Belgian Cup in 2022.

== History ==
Around the beginning of 2014 Limburg United was founded in the city of Hasselt. The name expressing the founders' motivation for there to be a top tier basketball team from Limburg province in the aftermath of Bree B.B.C. relegating from BLB Division I in 2008 and eventually disbanding. Limburg United asked for a B-licence for the 2014–15 Basketball League Belgium, and eventually got it. Former Antwerp Giants assistant Brian Lynch signed a 5-year contract to become United's head coach. The long-term goal of the club was expressed to "become a club in the subtop of Belgium in 3 or 5 years." In the 2016–17 season, Limburg reached the Final of the Belgian Basketball Cup but lost to Telenet Oostende.

Since the 2021–22 season, United plays in the BNXT League, in which the national leagues of Belgium and the Netherlands have been merged. On 14 March 2022, Limburg United won its first-ever trophy when it captured the Belgian Cup after defeating Oostende in the final.

== Honours ==
Belgian Basketball Cup

- Champions (2): 2021–22, 2023–24
- Runner-up (1): 2016–17

== Sponsorship names ==
The original Limburg United logo, as introduced in 2014

Due to sponsorship reasons, the club has been known as:

- Hubo Limburg United (2014–present)

== Roster ==
=== Current roster ===
Note: Flags indicate national team eligibility at FIBA-sanctioned events. Players may hold other non-FIBA nationalities not displayed.

Hubo Limburg United roster
Players
Coaches

Pos.	No.	Nat.	Name	Ht.	Age
G	0	(Belgium)	Di Maria, Tom	1.93 m (6 ft 4 in)	22 – 20 August 2004
PG	1	(Belgium)	Leenen, Lenn	1.81 m (5 ft 11 in)	20 – 1 August 2006
PG	2	(Belgium)	Van Der Zande, Cas	1.86 m (6 ft 1 in)	25 – 21 March 2001
PG	3	(Netherlands)	Ververs, Marijn	1.94 m (6 ft 4 in)	28 – 17 September 1998
G	5	(United States)	Hammond, Deion	1.93 m (6 ft 4 in)	27 – 5 June 1999
F	7	(United States)	Baumann, Noah	1.98 m (6 ft 6 in)	27 – 17 January 1999
PF	9	(Belgium)	Delalieux, Jonas	2.02 m (6 ft 8 in)	34 – 28 October 1992
C	10	(Belgium)	Gaterese, Aubin	2.11 m (6 ft 11 in)	25 – 16 August 2001
PF	11	(Belgium)	Goossens, Daan	1.97 m (6 ft 6 in)	17 – 12 November 2008
F	16	(Belgium)	Leemans, Wout (C)	2.05 m (6 ft 9 in)	24 – 11 December 2001
C	21	(Belgium)	Vanderhaegen, Thibault	2.02 m (6 ft 8 in)	28 – 16 February 1998
F	24	(United States)	Mims, Julius	2.06 m (6 ft 9 in)	25 – 31 August 2001
G	99	(United States)	Shahid, Vincent	1.80 m (5 ft 11 in)	28 – 13 May 1998

Head coach

- (Belgium) Raymond Westphalen

Assistant coach(es)

- (Belgium) Niels Marnegrave

Legend

- (C) Team captain
- Injured

- Roster
Updated: September 14, 2026

== Season by season ==
Season	Tier	League	Pos.	W–L	Belgian Cup	European competitions			Other competitions	
2014–15	1	First Division	5th	16–16	Quarterfinals					
2015–16	1	First Division	4th	19–16	Quarterfinals					
2016–17	1	First Division	6th	19–20	Runner-up	4 FIBA Europe Cup	RS	1–5		
2017–18	1	First Division	6th	16–22	Semifinalist				Supercup	RU
2018–19	1	First Division	4th	18–22	Quarterfinalist					
2019–20	1	PBL	4th	10–7						
2020–21	1	PBL	4th	16–15	Semifinalist					
2021–22	1	BNXT	12th	16–12	Champions					
2022–23	1	BNXT	8th	14–14						
2023–24	1	BNXT	5th	20–10	Champions					
2024–25	1	BNXT	4th	25–11	Quarterfinalist	4 FIBA Europe Cup	RS	2–4		
2025–26	1	BNXT	4th	23–11	Semifinalist					

== Players ==
=== Notable players ===
Note: Flags indicate national team eligibility at FIBA-sanctioned events. Players may hold other non-FIBA nationalities not displayed.

Criteria

To appear in this section a player must have either:

- Set a club record or won an individual award while at the club
- Played at least one official international match for their national team at any time
- Played at least one official NBA match at any time.

- (Finland) Topias Palmi
- (Israel) (Trinidad and Tobago) (United States) Khadeen Carrington
- (New Zealand) Robert Loe
- (United States) Jordan Hulls
- (United States) Stanton Kidd
- (United States) Osun Osunniyi
