= Henri Coosemans =

Belgian basketball player (1922–2008)

Personal information
- Full name: Henri Guillaume Coosemans
- Nationality: Belgian
- Born: 10 January 1922 Molenbeek-Saint-Jean, Belgium
- Died: 11 June 2008 (aged 86) Forest, Belgium

Sport
- Sport: Basketball

Achievements and titles
- Olympic finals: 1948 Summer Olympics, 1952 Summer Olympics

Henri Guillaume Coosemans (10 January 1922 – 11 June 2008) was a Belgian basketball player. He competed in the men's tournament at the 1948 Summer Olympics and the 1952 Summer Olympics. Coosemans died in Forest, Belgium on 11 June 2008, at the age of 86.
