= Antwerp Giants =

Belgian professional basketball club

Windrose Giants Antwerp
- Leagues: BNXT League; Champions League
- Founded: 1995; 31 years ago
- History: Racing Antwerpen; 1995–2006; Antwerp Giants; 2006–present
- Arena: Lotto Arena
- Capacity: 5,500
- Location: Antwerp, Belgium
- Team colors: Red, White, Black, Yellow
- President: Björn Verhoeven
- General manager: Eddy Faus
- Head coach: Roel Moors
- Team captain: Rasheed Bello
- Championships: 1 BNXT League; 1 BNXT Supercup; 2 Belgian Championships; 6 Belgian Cups; 2 Belgian Supercups
- Retired numbers: 1 (4)
- Website: antwerpgiants.be
Home	Away	Third

Former logo of the Antwerp Giants, without sponsor

Antwerp Giants, named Windrose Giants Antwerp for sponsorship reasons, is a Belgian professional basketball club based in Antwerp. Their home arena is Lotto Arena. The club plays in the BNXT League, the highest tier of Belgian basketball. The club was created from the merger of Sobabee and Racing Mechelen. Then named Racing Basket Antwerpen, it was renamed Antwerp Giants in 2005.

Antwerp has won the Belgian championship twice, in 2000 and 2026. The team has won five Belgian Cups and two Belgian Supercups.

== History ==
In 1995, Sobabee from Antwerp and Racing Mechelen merged into Racing Basket Antwerpen. The club made its debut on the highest stage in Belgium in the 1998–99 season. Antwerp was one of the top 3 teams until 2001. In the 1999–2000 season the club won its first national championship as Telindus Antwerpen, by beating Oostende 3–1 in the Finals. The team had a setback after the championship year and ended in the 6th, 7th or 8th place for five seasons in a row. In 2007 the club won its third trophy, by winning the Belgian Basketball Cup for the second time.

The second team of the club plays in the Belgian Second Division, while the women's team participates in the regional competition.

The team holds the attendance record for a basketball game in Belgium, with 17,135 spectators, on 31 January 2015, during their game against Spirou Charleroi, in the Sportpaleis. In June 2017, it was announced that Telenet would become the main sponsor of the team for three seasons. The signing of this sponsor, previously the main sponsor of Oostende, made the Giants one of the favorites in Belgian basketball.

The Port of Antwerp Giants logo (used until 2017)

In the 2018–19 season, Antwerp had its most successful season in club history. In Europe, it qualified for the Basketball Champions League (BCL) after advancing past three qualifying rounds. Antwerp was the surprise of the BCL season, as the team beat Murcia and Nizhny Novgorod in the round of 16 and quarterfinals. It qualified for the Final Four which was hosted in the city of Antwerp in the Sportpaleis. In the semi-finals, Antwerp lost to Iberostar Tenerife, and it won the third place game over Brose Bamberg. Domestically, Antwerp won the Belgian Basketball Cup for the first time in 12 years. In the PBL, Antwerp lost to Filou Oostende 1–3 in the finals.

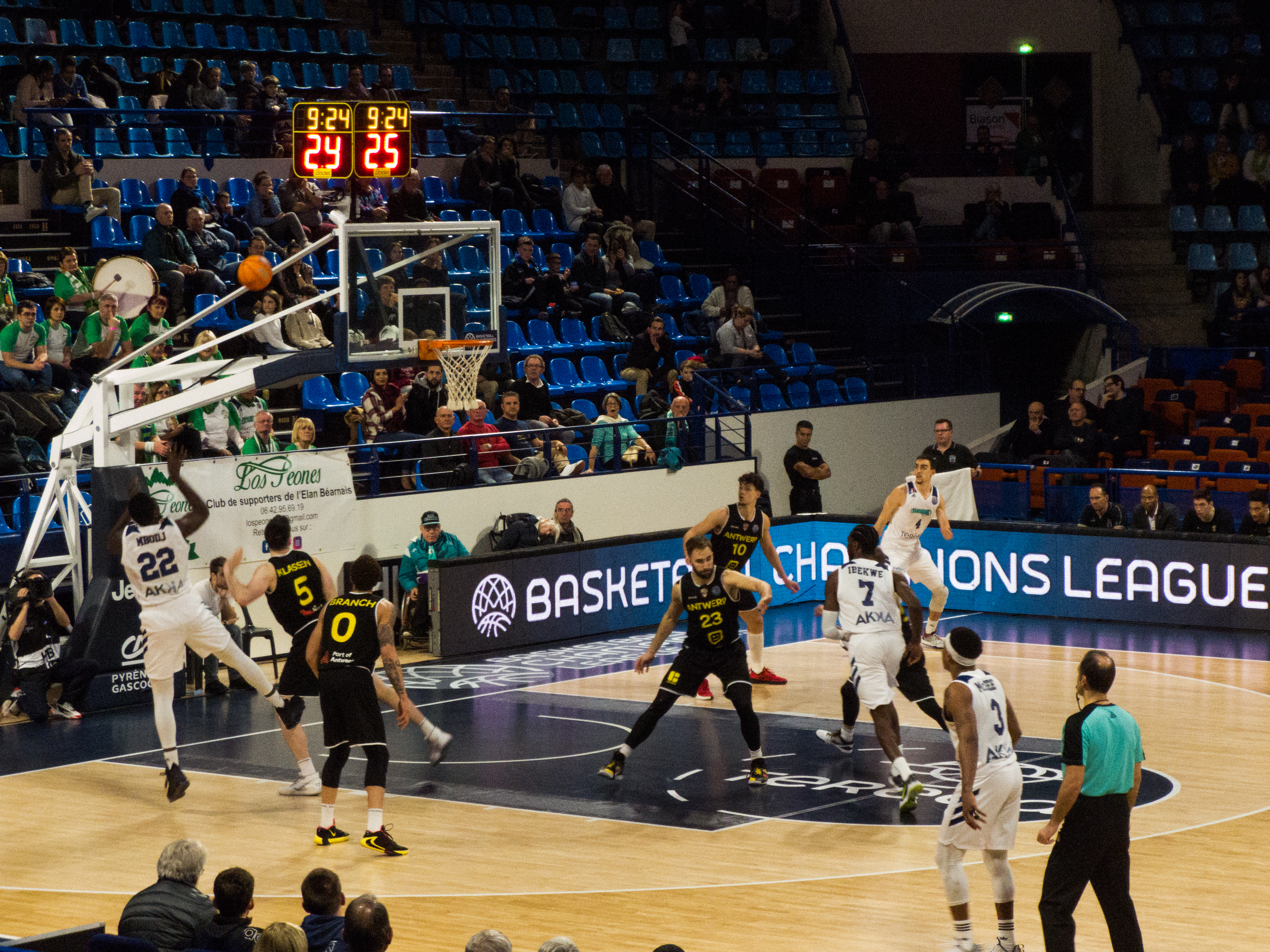
Against Élan Béarnais during the 2019–20 Champions League

Since the 2021–22 season, Antwerp plays in the BNXT League, in which the national leagues of Belgium and the Netherlands have been merged.

On 12 March 2023, the Giants won their fifth Belgian Cup title after beating Oostende in the final.

On 8 July 2024 Antwerp got a new name sponsor. The company Windrose Technology, which is located in electronic trucks are the new name sponsor. The new team name is Windrose Giants Antwerp.

== Trophies ==
=== Domestic competitions ===
- Belgian League

Champions (2): 1999–2000, 2025–26

- Belgian Cup

Winners (6): 1999–2000, 2006–07, 2018–19, 2019–20, 2022–23, 2025–26

- Belgian Supercup

Winners (2): 2007, 2016

=== Regional competitions ===
- BNXT League
  - Winners (1): 2025–26
- BNXT Supercup
  - Winners (1): 2026

=== European competitions ===
- Basketball Champions League
  - Third place (1): 2018–19

== Names ==
Due to sponsorship reasons, the name of the club has frequently changed:

- Racing Basket Antwerpen (1996–1999)
- Telindus Racing Antwerpen (1999–2004)
- Daewoo Racing Antwerpen (2005–2006)
- Sanex Antwerp Giants (2006–2008)
- Antwerp Diamond Giants (2008–2011)
- Port of Antwerp Giants (2011–2017)
- Telenet Giants Antwerp (2017–2024)
- Windrose Giants Antwerp (2024–present)

== Players ==
=== Retired numbers ===
Antwerp Giants retired numbers
N°	Nat.	Player	Position	Tenure	Retired
4	(Belgium)	Roel Moors	PG	2000–2002, 2009–2015	October 8, 2015

=== Current roster ===
Note: Flags indicate national team eligibility at FIBA-sanctioned events. Players may hold other non-FIBA nationalities not displayed.

Windrose Giants Antwerp roster
Players
Coaches

Pos.	No.	Nat.	Name	Ht.	Age
SG	0	(United States)	James, Jehloni	2.01 m (6 ft 7 in)	25 – 29 June 2001
PG	5	(United States)	Cheeks, Enoch	1.91 m (6 ft 3 in)	25 – 15 April 2001
PG	6	(Belgium)	Coleman, Noël	1.88 m (6 ft 2 in)	26 – 17 January 2000
F	7	(United States)	Edwards, Cesare	2.01 m (6 ft 7 in)	23 – 26 December 2002
F	8	(United States)	Van Drom, Letto	2.03 m (6 ft 8 in)	20 – 17 August 2006
PG	9	(United States)	Pack, Nijel	1.78 m (5 ft 10 in)	25 – 22 May 2001
SG	11	(United States)	White, Jacari	1.91 m (6 ft 3 in)	23 – 11 June 2003
G	13	(United States)	Murray, Joel	1.83 m (6 ft 0 in)	26 – 23 November 1999
C	24	(Belgium) (Democratic Republic of the Congo)	Tumba, Kevin	2.06 m (6 ft 9 in)	35 – 23 February 1991
PF	26	(Belgium)	De Ridder, Niels (injured) (C)	1.95 m (6 ft 5 in)	25 – 7 February 2001
PF	32	(Belgium)	Kesteloot, Vincent	1.98 m (6 ft 6 in)	31 – 23 March 1995

Head coach

- (Belgium) Roel Moors

Assistant coach(es)

- (Belgium) Christophe Beghin
- (Belgium) Tom Van den Bosch

Legend

- (C) Team captain
- Injured

- Roster
Updated: October 29, 2026

== Season by season ==
Season	Tier	League	Pos.	W–L	BNXT	Belgian Cup	European competitions		
2010–11	1	Division I	5th	18–17	–	Semifinalist	3 EuroChallenge	L16	4–1–3
2011–12	1	Division I	3rd	23–11	–	Runner-up	3 EuroChallenge	T16	6–6
2012–13	1	Division I	5th	17–13	–	Last 16	3 EuroChallenge	RS	4–2
2013–14	1	Division I	4th	21–21	–	Runner-up	3 EuroChallenge	T16	7–5
2014–15	1	Division I	6th	16–17	–	Semifinalist	3 EuroChallenge	T16	6–6
2015–16	1	Division I	5th	14–16	–	Runner-up	3 FIBA Europe Cup	QF	13–4
2016–17	1	Division I	3rd	25–17	–	Quarterfinalist	4 FIBA Europe Cup	R2	8–4
2017–18	1	Division I	2nd	31–12	–	Quarterfinalist	3 Champions League	QR3	5–1
2017–18	1	Division I	2nd	31–12	–	Quarterfinalist	4 FIBA Europe Cup	RS	3–3
2018–19	1	Division I	2nd	35–9	–	Champion	3 Champions League	3rd	15–9
2019–20	1	Division I	3rd (Note: The 2019–20 PBL season was cancelled early because of the COVID-19 pandemic.)	11–6	–	Champion	3 Champions League	RS	4–10
2020–21	1	Division I	3rd	20–11	–	Quarterfinals	2 EuroCup	RS	1–9
2021–22	1	BNXT	4th	17–11	6th	Semifinalist	4 FIBA Europe Cup	R2	5–7
2022–23	1	BNXT	2nd	22–6	5th	Champion	4 FIBA Europe Cup	RS	3–5
2023–24	1	BNXT	2nd	22–8	3rd	Quarterfinalist			
2024–25	1	BNXT	6th	23–13	6th	Semifinalist	4 FIBA Europe Cup	RS	2–4
2025–26	1	BNXT	1st	37–8	Champion	Champion	3 Champions League	QR	2–1
2025–26	1	BNXT	1st	37–8	Champion	Champion	4 FIBA Europe Cup	RS	3–3

== Head coaches ==
Name	Nat.	Tenure
Arik Shivek	(Israel)	2005–2007
Sven van Camp	(Belgium)	2007–2008
Eddy Casteels	(Belgium)	2008–2013
Paul Vervaeck	(Belgium)	2013–2015
Roel Moors	(Belgium)	2015–2019
Christophe Beghin	(Belgium)	2019–2022
Luc Smout	(Belgium)	2022
Ivica Skelin	(Croatia)	2022–2024
Geert Hammink	(Netherlands)	2024
Jill Lorent	(Belgium)	2024–2025
Roel Moors	(Belgium)	2025–present

== Notable former players ==
A list of former players of Antwerp Giants since 2000

- (United States) (Serbia) Kevin Punter (2017)
- (United States) Jordan Callahan (2014)
- (Belgium) Maxime De Zeeuw (2012–14)
- (Belgium) Yannick Driesen (2012–14)
- (Serbia) Marko Špica (2013–14)
- (United States) Frank Turner (2013–14)
- (United States) Clayton Vette (2013–14)
- (United States) (Belgium) Ralph Biggs (2010–13)
- (United States) Jason Love (2012–13)
- (Tunisia) Salah Mejri (2010–12)
- (United States) Michael Roll (2010–12)
- (United States) Julian Vaughn (2011–12)
- (Belgium) Christophe Beghin (2008–10)
- (United States) Thomas Gardner (2009–10)
- (Netherlands) Nick Oudendag (2007–09)
- (United States) Brian Lynch (2008–09)
- (Montenegro) Mladen Sekularac (2005–08)
- (United States) Ryan Sears (2007–08)
- (United States) Ian Hanavan (2007–08)
- (United States) Ayinde Ubaka (2007–08)
- (United States) Len Matela (2003–07)
- (Israel) Gur Shelef (2005–07)
- (Belgium) Domien Loubry (2001–06)
- (Belgium) Sebastien Bellin (2003–06)
- (Hungary) Peter Lorant (2005–06)
- (Belgium) Ron Ellis (2004–05)
- (United States) (Italy) Shaun Stonerook (2000–01)
- (United States) Otis Hill (2000–01)
- (United States) Speedy Smith (2020)
- (Serbia) Milos Babic (2000–01)
- (Belgium) Andy Van Vliet (2014–15)
- (United States) Paris Lee (2017–19)
- (Belgium) Hans Vanwijn (2017–20)
