= 2021–22 ZZ Leiden season =

ZZ Leiden
2021–22 season
- Head coach: Geert Hammink (2nd season)
- Arena: Vijf Meihal
- BNXT League: Champions
- Basketball Cup: Semifinalist
- BNXT Supercup: Runner-up (lost to Oostende)
- Dutch Supercup: Winners (defeated BAL)
- FIBA Europe Cup: Semifinalists

The 2021–22 ZZ Leiden season was the 35th season in the existence of the club, and the 15th season under the entity of ZZ Leiden. The club played its first season in the BNXT League, the newly established league which combines the Belgian and Dutch national leagues.

Leiden won the inaugural BNXT championship and finished as runners-up in the Dutch playoffs.

== Overview ==
Competition	Round	Pld	W	L	Result
BNXT League	National Round	20	17	3	2nd place
BNXT League	Elite Gold	10	6	4	3rd place
BNXT League	National playoffs	5	6	2	Runners-up
BNXT League	BNXT playoffs	4	3	1	Champion
Dutch Cup		5	4	1	Semifinalist
Dutch Supercup		1	1	0	Champion
BNXT Supercup		1	0	1	Runner-up
Europe
Basketball Champions League	Qualifying rounds	2	1	1	Semifinals
FIBA Europe Cup	Regular season	6	3	3	Semifinalist
FIBA Europe Cup	Second round	6	4	2	Semifinalist
FIBA Europe Cup	Playoffs	4	1	3	Semifinalist
Total		64	46	18	

== Players ==
=== Current roster ===
ZZ Leiden roster
Players
Coaches

Pos.	No.	Nat.	Name	Ht.	Wt.	Age
SF	0	(Lithuania)	Mikalauskas, Arūnas	2.04 m (6 ft 8 in)	97 kg (214 lb)	27 – 14 September 1997
PG	2	(Netherlands)	Bouwknecht, Maarten	1.88 m (6 ft 2 in)		30 – 14 December 1994
C	3	(Denmark)	Midtgaard, Asbjørn	2.13 m (7 ft 0 in)	122 kg (269 lb)	27 – 20 September 1997
PG	4	(Netherlands)	Windt, Jamayro	1.82 m (6 ft 0 in)		23 – 17 April 2001
G	5	(Netherlands)	Ververs, Marijn (C)	1.94 m (6 ft 4 in)		26 – 17 July 1998
G/F	6	(Netherlands)	de Jong, Worthy	1.94 m (6 ft 4 in)	84 kg (185 lb)	37 – 14 March 1988
PF	7	(Lithuania)	Tubutis, Einaras	2.07 m (6 ft 9 in)	90 kg (198 lb)	26 – 4 November 1998
PF	9	(Netherlands)	Tjon Affo, Quincy	2.03 m (6 ft 8 in)		24 – 13 August 2000
C	10	(Netherlands)	van 't Hoff, Mees	2.08 m (6 ft 10 in)		23 – 27 April 2001
G/F	11	(Netherlands)	Jonathan, Kevin	2.01 m (6 ft 7 in)		22 – 24 July 2002
SG	12	(United States)	Dunn, Jhonathan	1.93 m (6 ft 4 in)		27 – 17 February 1998
F	13	(Netherlands)	van Bree, Luuk	2.06 m (6 ft 9 in)	102 kg (225 lb)	29 – 24 February 1996
F	14	(Netherlands)	Kruithof, Lucas	2.01 m (6 ft 7 in)		24 – 17 July 2000
C	15	(Nigeria)	Olisemeka, Peter	2.07 m (6 ft 9 in)	105 kg (231 lb)	33 – 9 December 1991

Head coach

- (Netherlands) Geert Hammink

Assistant coach(es)

- (Netherlands) Stefan Philips

Strength & conditioning coach(es)

- (Netherlands) Johan van der Bent
- (Netherlands) Jasper Haasnoot

Physiotherapist(s)

- (Netherlands) Arjen van de Paverd
- (Netherlands) Erik van der Pot

Team manager

- (Netherlands) Bart Kriek

Legend

- (C) Team captain
- (DP) Development player
- (I) Import player
- Injured

- Roster
Updated: 26 February 2022

=== Depth chart ===
Pos.	Starting 5	Bench 1	Bench 2
C	Asbjørn Midtgaard	Peter Olisemeka	Mees van 't Hoff
PF	Einaras Tubutis	Luuk van Bree	Quincy Tjon Affo
SF	Jhonathan Dunn	Worthy de Jong	Kevin Jonathan
SG	Arunas Mikalauskas	Maarten Bouwknecht	Lucas Kruithof
PG	Marijn Ververs	Jamayro Windt

=== Transactions ===
==== In ====
No.	Pos.	Nat.	Name	Age	Moving from		Ends	Date	Source
2	G	(Netherlands)	Maarten Bouwknecht	26	Worcester Wolves	(United Kingdom)	2022	4 July 2021	
0	F	(Lithuania)	Arūnas Mikalauskas	23	Feyenoord	(Netherlands)	2022	7 July 2021	
3	C	(Denmark)	Asbjørn Midtgaard	23	Grand Canyon Antelopes	(United States)	2022	16 August 2021	
12	SG	(United States)	Jhonathan Dunn	23	Landstede Hammers	(Netherlands)	2022	6 July 2021	
7	PF	(Lithuania)	Einaras Tubutis	22	Prienai	(Lithuania)	2022	26 August 2021	
9	PF	(Netherlands)	Quincy Tjon Affo	20	Heroes Den Bosch	(Netherlands)	Undisclosed	20 August 2021	
15	C	(Nigeria)	Peter Olisemeka	30	SCM U Craiova	(Romania)	Undisclosed	26 February 2022	

=== Out ===
No.	Pos.	Nat.	Name	Age	Moving to		Type	Date	Source
1	PG	(United States)	Giddy Pots	25	Blu Basket 1971	(Italy)	End of contract	23 June 2021	
7	PF	(United States)	Michael Finke	25	Aris Thessaloniki	(Greece)	End of contract	25 September 2021	
8	G	(Netherlands)	Romano Sibilo	17			End of contract		
9	G	(Netherlands)	Troy Koehler	20	Den Helder Suns	(Netherlands)	End of contract	15 June 2021	
15	C	(Netherlands)	Emmanuel Nzekwesi	15	Belfius Mons-Hainaut	(Belgium)	End of contract	19 July 2021	

== FIBA Europe Cup ==
Date time, TV	Rank^{#}	Opponent^{#}	Result	Record	High points	High rebounds	High assists	Site (attendance) city, state
Regular season
13 October 2021		(Greece) Iraklis	W 71–63	1–0	17 – Midtgaard	11 – Midtgaard	5 – Tied	Vijf Meihal; Leiden
20 October 2021		at (Montenegro) Mornar	L 74–84	1–1	27 – Midtgaard	11 – Midtgaard	4 – Tied	Topolica Sport Hall; Bar
27 October 2021		(Turkey) Bahçeşehir Koleji	L 69–79	1–2	15 – Midtgaard	11 – Midtgaard	4 – Mikalauskas	Vijf Meihal; Leiden
3 November 2021		at (Greece) Iraklis	W 92–83	2–2	15 – Tied	8 – Tied	11 – De Jong	Ivanofeio Sports Arena; Thessaloniki
10 November 2021		(Montenegro) Mornar	W 78–73	3–2	22 – Dunn	10 – Tubutis	5 – Dunn	Vijf Meihal; Leiden
17 November 2021		at (Turkey) Bahçeşehir Koleji	L 61–84	3–3	14 – Dunn	11 – Tubutis	7 – De Jong	Ülker Sports Arena; Istanbul
Second round
13 October 2021		at (Germany) Medi Bayreuth	W 98–84	4–3	27 – Dunn	13 – Midtgaard	9 – De Jong	Oberfrankenhallen; Bayreuth
13 October 2021		(Poland) Legia Warsaw	L 78–90	4–4	32 – De Jong	8 – De Jong	8 – De Jong	Vijf Meihal; Leiden
13 January 2022		at (Russia) Parma	L 91–99	5–4	19 – Tubutis	10 – Tubutis	6 – De Jong	Universal Sports Palace Molot; Perm
26 January 2022		(Germany) Medi Bayreuth	W 98–93	6–4	21 – Dunn	5 – Dunn	6 – Mikalauskas	Vijf Meihal; Leiden
2 February 2022		at (Poland) Legia Warsaw	W 77–59	7–4	17 – Tied	13 – Tubutis	4 – De Jong	Bemowo; Warsaw
9 February 2022		(Russia) Parma	W 79–75	8–4	18 – Dunn	9 – Midtgaard	4 – De Jong	Vijf Meihal; Leiden
Quarterfinals
9 March 2022		at (Germany) Hakro Merlins Crailsheim; First leg	L 68–71	8–4	15 – Mikalauskas	11 – Midtgaard	4 – Tied	Arena Hohenlohe; Ilshofen
16 March 2022		(Germany) Hakro Merlins Crailsheim; Second leg	W 85–77	9–5	23 – Bouwknecht	13 – Tubutis	5 – Mikalauskas	Vijf Meihal; Leiden
Semifinals
30 March 2022		(Turkey) Bahçeşehir Koleji; First leg	L 71–77	9–6	17 – Dunn	8 – Midtgaard	5 – Tied	Vijf Meihal; Leiden
6 April 2022		at (Turkey) Bahçeşehir Koleji; Second leg	L 82–90	9–7	21 – Dunn	6 – Midtgaard	10 – De Jong	Ülker Sports Arena; Istanbul
