= Keye van der Vuurst =

Dutch basketball player

- Keye van der Vuurst

No. 1 – Esenler Erokspor
- Position: Point guard
- League: BSL

Personal information
- Born: 29 December 2001 (age 24) Rijswijk, Netherlands
- Listed height: 191 cm (6 ft 3 in)
- Listed weight: 85 kg (187 lb)

Career information
- Playing career: 2018–present

Career history
- 2018–2023: Oostende
- 2023–2024: Palencia
- 2024–2026: Joventut Badalona
- 2024–2025: → Força Lleida
- 2025–2026: → Büyükçekmece
- 2026–present: Esenler Erokspor

Career highlights
- Turkish Super League assists leader (2026); BNXT Belgian Finals MVP (2022); 5× Belgian League champion (2019–2023); Belgian Cup champion (2021); 2× Belgian Supercup champion (2018, 2021); 2× BNXT Supercup winner (2021, 2022)
Medals
Men's basketball
Representing the Netherlands
FIBA Europe U18 Championship Division B
Gold medal – first place	2018	National team

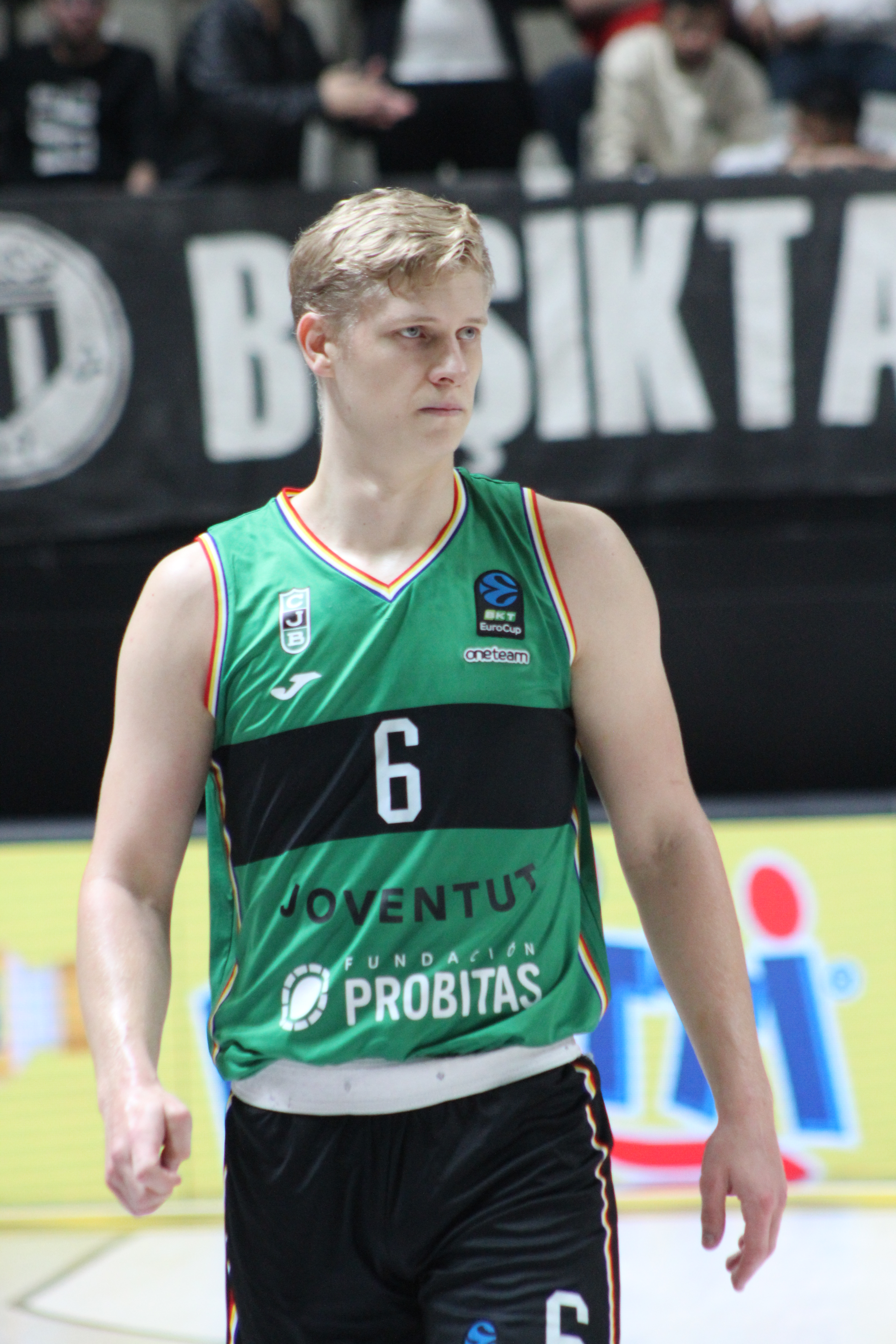
van der Vuurst with Joventut in 2024

Keye van der Vuurst de Vries (born 29 December 2001) is a Dutch professional basketball player for Esenler Erokspor of the Turkish Basketbol Süper Ligi (BSL). He played in the youth academy and senior team of Oostende, and is a five-time Belgian League champion and one time Finals MVP with the team. He is the youngest player to ever play in the Netherlands national basketball team, making his debut at age 16.

== Early life and career ==
Throughout his childhood, Van der Vuurst de Vries played with the amateur team Lokomotief, in his hometown Rijswijk. In 2017, he signed with Belgian club BC Oostende, where he played for the youth teams as well for Duva Fruit.

== Professional career ==
Van der Vuurst de Vries made his debut with BC Oostende in the 2018–19 Pro Basketball League season. For the following 2019–20 season, he was given a permanent spot on Oostende's roster. He won three consecutive Pro Basketball League championships with Oostende. On 27 May 2022, he won his fourth consecutive Belgian championship and was named the Finals MVP after averaging 9 points and 7.8 assists in the series against Kangoeroes.

On 26 April 2022, he declared for the 2022 NBA draft.

On 27 May 2024, he signed with Joventut Badalona of the Spanish Liga ACB. On 9 December 2024, Van der Vuurst de Vries was sent on loan to Força Lleida CE for the remainder of the 2024–25 season.

On 3 September 2025, he was sent to loan to Büyükçekmece Basketbol of the Basketbol Süper Ligi (BSL).

On September 10, 2026, he signed with Esenler Erokspor of the Basketbol Süper Ligi (BSL).

== National team career ==
=== Junior teams ===
In 2018, Van der Vuurst de Vries won the 2018 FIBA Europe Under-18 Championship Division B while playing with the Dutch under-18 team. He scored a game-high 35 points in the final, in which Slovenia was defeated easily by 86–57.

=== Senior team ===
On 16 November 2018, van der Vuurst was selected by head coach Toon van Helfteren to be a part of the Netherlands senior team. On 29 November 2018, Van der Vuurst de Vries made his debut for the Netherlands at age 16, making him the youngest player ever to play for the Dutch team. He surpassed the record set in 1961 by Ger Kok. In his debut game, the Netherlands played Poland, and lost 78–105.

== Personal ==
Keye is the younger brother of Boyd, who plays professional basketball for Okapi Aalst.

== Honours ==
=== Club ===
Oostende

- 5× Pro Basketball League / BNXT Belgian Champions: 2018–19, 2019–20, 2020–21, 2021–22, 2022–23
- Belgian Cup: 2020–21
- Belgian Basketball Supercup: 2018
- 2× BNXT Supercup: 2021, 2022

=== Individual ===
- BNXT Belgian Finals MVP: 2022
