= 2021 BNXT Supercup =

ZZ Leiden	Filou Oostende
68	90
- Date: 11 September 2021; 20:00 GMT+2
- Venue: Maaspoort, 's-Hertogenbosch
- MVP: Levi Randolph
- Attendance: 2,000

The 2021 BNXT Supercup was the inaugural edition of the BNXT Supercup, the supercup of the newly established BNXT League. The game was played on 11 September 2021 in the Maaspoort in 's-Hertogenbosch.

The game featured ZZ Leiden, winners of the 2020–21 Dutch Basketball League, facing Filou Oostende, the winners of the 2020–21 Pro Basketball League.

== Match details ==
Oostende easily beat Leiden in the first Supercup game. Oostende guard Keye van der Vuurst de Vries recorded a career-high 13 assists for the winning team, while Levi Randolph led the team in scoring with 16 points.

11 September 2021	ZZ Leiden (Netherlands)	68–90	(Belgium) Filou Oostende	's-Hertogenbosch
20:00 GMT+2	Scoring by quarter: 18–25, 21–23, 15–27, 14–15
	Pts: Dunn 22; Rebs: Midtgaard 8 Asts: Mikalauskas & Ververs 5	Boxscore	Pts: Randolph 16; Rebs: Buysschaert 5 Asts: Van der Vuurst de Vries 13	Arena: Maaspoort; Attendance: 2,000

ZZ Leiden	Oostende
