= Luuk van Bree =

Dutch basketball player (born 1996)

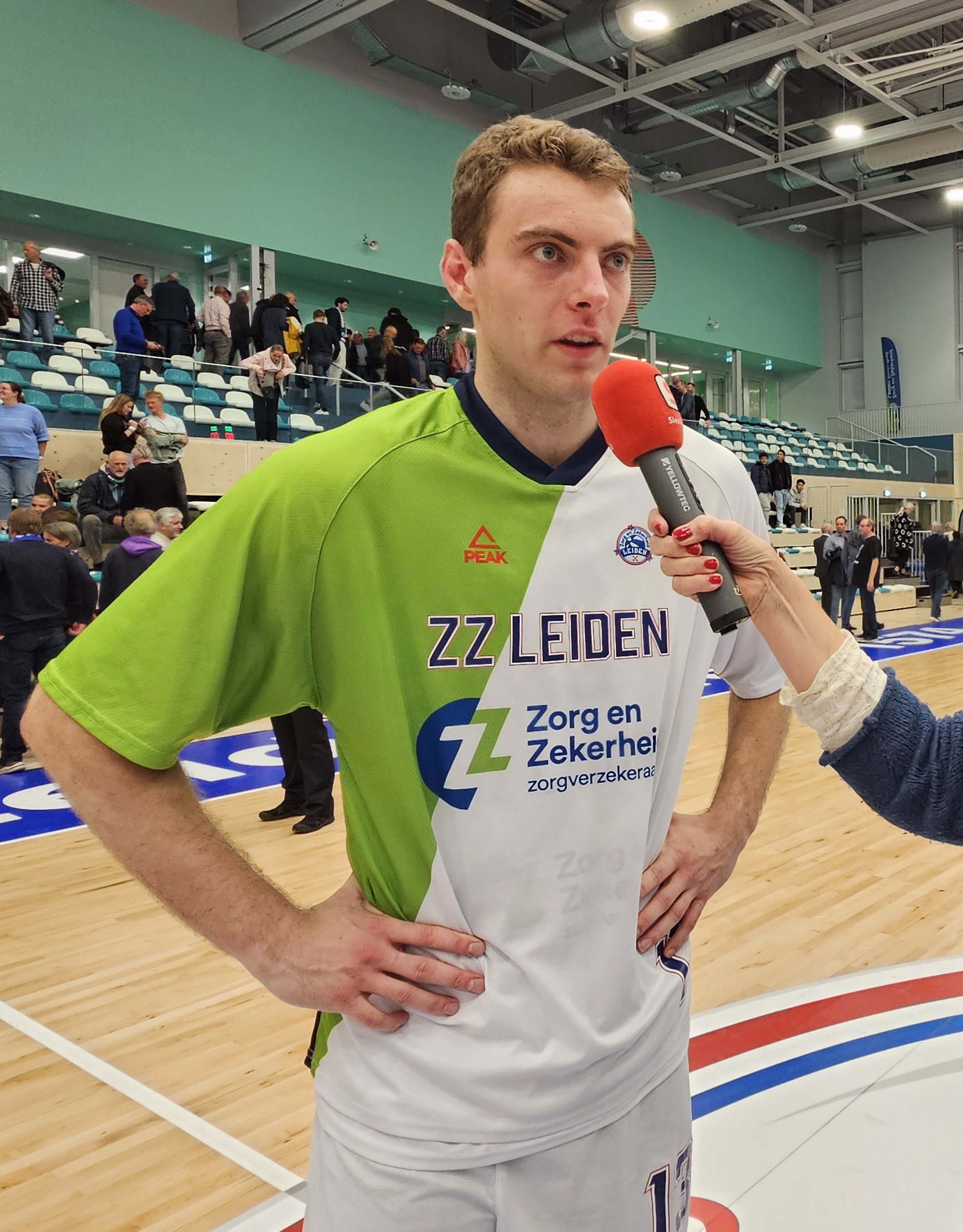
- Van Bree in 2023

No. 20 – Heroes Den Bosch
- Position: Power forward
- League: BNXT League

Personal information
- Born: 24 February 1996 (age 30) Helmond, Netherlands
- Listed height: 206 cm (6 ft 9 in)
- Listed weight: 102 kg (225 lb)

Career information
- College: Bradley (2015–2019)
- NBA draft: 2019: undrafted
- Playing career: 2020–present

Career history
- 2020–2024: ZZ Leiden
- 2024–present: Heroes Den Bosch

Career highlights
- 2× BNXT League champion (2022, 2023); 4× Dutch League champion (2021, 2023, 2024, 2025); 2× Dutch Cup winner (2023, 2025); 3× Dutch Supercup winner (2021, 2023, 2025); DBL All-Rookie Team (2021)

Luuk van Bree (born 24 February 1996) is a Dutch basketball player for Heroes Den Bosch of the BNXT League. He played four years of collegiate basketball for Bradley, before turning professional in 2020 and returning to the Netherlands to sign with ZZ Leiden. With Leiden, Van Bree won three national championships, before signing for rivals Heroes Den Bosch in 2024.

Van Bree also played for the Netherlands national team.

== College career ==
As a freshman at Bradley, van Bree averaged 8.4 points and 4.6 rebounds per game. He was named to the Missouri Valley Conference All-Freshman Team. He averaged 6.5 points and 3.3 rebounds per game as a sophomore, leading the team with 26 steals. van Bree posted 4.8 points and 2.4 rebounds per game as a junior. As a senior, van Bree averaged 5.7 points and 4.0 rebounds per game.

== Professional career ==
On 25 June 2020, van Bree signed a 2-year contract with ZZ Leiden of the Dutch Basketball League (DBL).

Van Bree won the 2023 Dutch national championship and played a crucial role in the decisive Game 5 win against Donar. He scored 17 points in the fourth quarter, which helped Leiden come back from a 16-point deficit with 2:41 on the clock.

He transferred to Leiden's rivals Heroes Den Bosch on 19 June 2024, when he signed a two-year contract. On March 23, 2025, he won the Dutch Cup, his personal second cup title.

== National team career ==
Van Bree made his debut with the Netherlands men's national basketball team on 22 February 2021 in a game against Sweden under coach Maurizio Buscaglia.
