= Breein Tyree =

American basketball player (born 1998)

- Tyree with PAOK Thessaloniki in 2026

No. 5 – PAOK Thessaloniki
- Position: Shooting guard / point guard
- League: Greek Basketball League; EuroCup

Personal information
- Born: January 13, 1998 (age 28) Somerset, New Jersey, U.S.
- Listed height: 6 ft 2 in (1.88 m)
- Listed weight: 195 lb (88 kg)

Career information
- High school: Rutgers Prep (Somerset, New Jersey); St. Joseph (Metuchen, New Jersey)
- College: Ole Miss (2016–2020)
- NBA draft: 2020: undrafted
- Playing career: 2020–present

Career history
- 2020–2022: Raptors 905
- 2022: Indios de San Francisco de Macorís
- 2022–2023: Oostende
- 2023–2024: Dinamo Sassari
- 2024–2025: Petkim Spor
- 2025: Igokea
- 2025–present: PAOK Thessaloniki

Career highlights
- Belgian League champion (2023); BNXT League Dream Team (2023); BNXT Supercup winner (2022); All-Greek League Team (2026); 2× First-team All-SEC – Coaches (2019, 2020); Second-team All-SEC – AP (2019)
- Stats at NBA.com
- Stats at Basketball Reference

Breein Alon Tyree (born January 13, 1998) is an American-born naturalized Albanian professional basketball player for PAOK Thessaloniki of the Greek Basketball League (GBL) and EuroCup. He also represents the Albania national basketball team. He played college basketball for the Ole Miss Rebels.

== High school career ==
Raised in the Somerset section of Franklin Township, Somerset County, New Jersey, Tyree played basketball, football, lacrosse and soccer in high school. He played lacrosse as a freshman for Rutgers Preparatory School in Somerset, New Jersey before suffering a lung contusion. In his sophomore year, Tyree transferred to St. Joseph High School in Metuchen, New Jersey. As a sophomore, he played soccer for the United States at an international youth tournament in Europe, but his mother soon drew him away from the sport. On the football field, Tyree played quarterback and safety for St. Joseph and received several college scholarship offers. Tyree was basketball teammates with Karl-Anthony Towns. As a junior, he averaged 18.8 points, 4.9 assists and 3.3 steals per game and was named Greater Middlesex Conference (GMC) player of the year. In his senior season, Tyree averaged 16.2 points, 4.8 rebounds and 4.5 assists per game. He was named first team all-conference and second team all-state, and led St. Joseph to the Greater Middlesex Conference tournament championship. Tyree was considered a three-star recruit and committed to play college basketball for Ole Miss over offers from Kansas State, UMass and USC, among others.

== College career ==
Tyree became a starter at Ole Miss as a freshman despite playing with a knee injury. He averaged 7.3 points per game as a freshman and helped the team reach the NIT quarterfinals. As a sophomore, Tyree averaged 10.8 points, 2.8 assists and 2.2 rebounds per game on a team that only won 12 games. Tyree scored a season-high 31 points in an 81–71 win against Vanderbilt and was named SEC player of the week on January 7, 2019. He had 31 points on February 23 in an 80–64 win over Georgia and took a knee before tipoff to protest a Confederacy rally in the area. Tyree averaged 17.9 points, 2.9 boards and 2.8 assists per game as a junior. He was named to the First Team All-SEC. After the season, Tyree declared for the 2019 NBA draft but ultimately opted to return. He was one of 24 players invited to the Chris Paul Elite Guard Camp.

On December 14, Tyree scored 34 points in an 82–64 win over Middle Tennessee. Tyree was named SEC player of the week on February 10, 2020, after scoring 38 points in an 84–70 win against South Carolina. The next day, Tyree scored a career-high 40 points and had five rebounds and four assists in an 83–58 win over Mississippi State. At the conclusion of the regular season, Tyree was named to the First Team All-SEC. He averaged 19.7 points, 3.7 rebounds, and 2.5 assists per game as a senior.

== Professional career ==
=== NBA G League ===
After going undrafted in the 2020 NBA draft, Tyree signed with the Miami Heat on November 25, 2020. On December 16, 2020, Tyree was waived by the Heat. On December 19, he was signed and immediately waived by the Toronto Raptors for the purpose of joining their G-League team, Raptors 905, as an affiliate player. On March 1, 2021, Tyree's contract with Raptors 905 ended. He finished his rookie season as a pro appearing in 9 games and averaging 9.6 points, 3.1 assists and 1.1 rebounds a game.

Tyree re-signed by the Raptors on October 16, 2021, and waived to join the Raptors 905. On January 23, 2022, he was suspended three games by the G League. Tyree was waived on February 7. On February 10, 2022, Tyree was reacquired and activated by the Raptors 905. Tyree averaged 13.1 points, 3.1 assists and 2.8 rebounds in 36 games during the 2021–2022 season.

=== Indios de San Francisco ===
In the summer of 2022, Tyree signed in the Dominican top division Liga Nacional de Baloncesto with Indios de San Francisco de Macorís for the 2022 season. He averaged 20.2 points, 2.7 rebounds and 3.2 assists per game leading the club to a 12–7 record.

=== Oostende ===
He signed with Filou Oostende of the BNXT League on August 2. On September 17, he won the BNXT Supercup with Oostende after scoring 35 points in his debut against Heroes Den Bosch. Tyree averaged 15.6 points, 2.0 rebounds and 2.5 assists per in the 2022–2023 season in the BNXT League. In the Champions League he averaged 17.4 points, 3.2 rebounds and 2.8 assists per game. His team won the 2023 BNXT Championship for the 24th time and Tyree was named to the 2023 BNXT League Dream Team.

=== Dinamo Sassari ===
In the summer of 2023, Tyree signed with Dinamo Sassari of the first division Italian league Lega Basket Serie A and the Basketball Champions League.

=== Petkim Spor ===
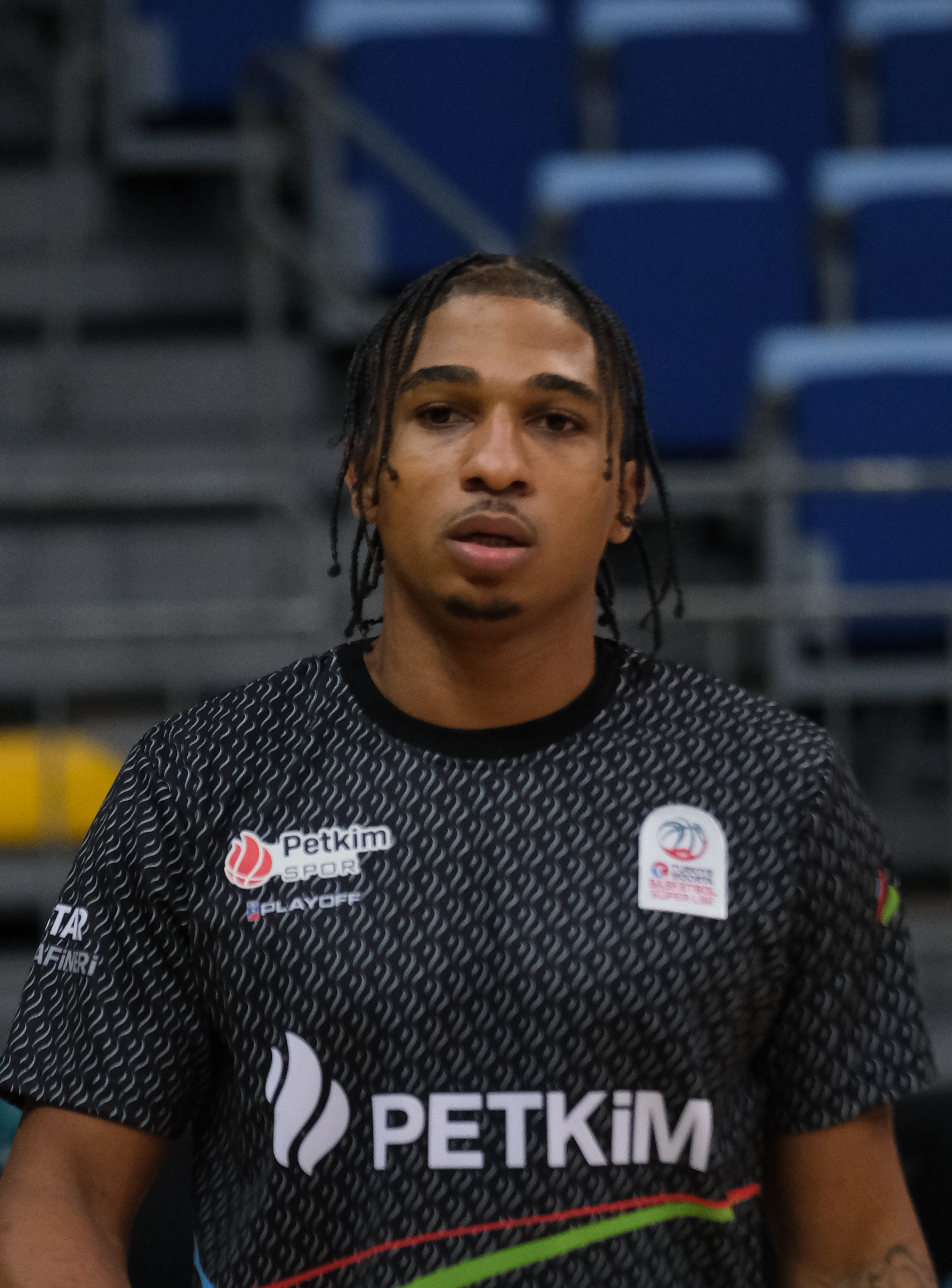
Tyree with Petkim Spor in 2024

On June 21, 2024, he signed with Petkim Spor of the Basketbol Süper Ligi (BSL).

=== Igokea ===
On July 10, 2025, he signed with Igokea m:tel of the Bosnian League.

=== PAOK Thessaloniki (2025–present) ===
On December 10, 2025, Tyree joined Greek club PAOK for the remainder of the 2025–26 season.

Tyree quickly established himself as one of PAOK's key players during the season, playing a significant role in the team's campaign. He appeared in 32 games across all competitions, averaging 16.6 points, 2.9 rebounds, 3.2 assists and 1.2 steals per game.

Following discussions with incoming head coach Andrea Trinchieri and as part of PAOK's planning for the 2026–27 season, Tyree agreed to remain with the club. On July 2, 2026, PAOK announced the extension of his contract for one more season.

== Albania national team ==
In June 2026, Tyree obtained Albanian citizenship, making him eligible to represent the Albania national basketball team.

On July 2, 2026, Tyree made his debut for Albania in an away game against Kosovo during the first round of the FIBA EuroBasket 2029 Pre-Qualifiers. He recorded 25 points, four rebounds and eight assists, helping Albania to an 89–82 victory.

== Career statistics ==
Legend
GP	Games played	GS	Games started	MPG	Minutes per game
FG%	Field goal percentage	3P%	3-point field goal percentage	FT%	Free throw percentage
RPG	Rebounds per game	APG	Assists per game	SPG	Steals per game
BPG	Blocks per game	PPG	Points per game	**Bold**	Career high

=== College ===
Year	Team	GP	GS	MPG	FG%	3P%	FT%	RPG	APG	SPG	BPG	PPG
2016–17	Ole Miss	**34**	22	19.1	.373	.310	.703	1.9	1.9	.6	.0	7.3
2017–18	Ole Miss	32	23	25.2	.394	.356	.700	2.2	**2.8**	.7	.3	10.8
2018–19	Ole Miss	33	**33**	33.8	**.459**	**.375**	**.831**	2.9	**2.8**	1.0	**.4**	17.9
2019–20	Ole Miss	31	30	**34.6**	.427	.360	.822	**3.7**	2.5	**1.3**	.1	**19.7**
Career		130	108	28.1	.421	.356	.787	2.7	2.5	.9	.2	13.8

== Personal life ==
Tyree's father, Mark, was a third-team All-American college lacrosse player for Rutgers and is a 2009 New Jersey Lacrosse Hall of Fame inductee. His older brother, Jevon, is a former cornerback for Rutgers. His cousin, David Tyree, played in the National Football League (NFL) and won Super Bowl XLII with the New York Giants after making the famous Helmet Catch.
