= 1979–80 FIBA European Cup Winners' Cup =

- League: FIBA European Cup Winners' Cup
- Sport: Basketball

Final
- Champions: (Italy) Emerson Varese
- Runners-up: (Italy) Gabetti Cantù

FIBA European Cup Winners' Cup seasons
- ← 1978–79 1980–81 →

The 1979–80 FIBA European Cup Winners' Cup was the fourteenth edition of FIBA's 2nd-tier level European-wide professional club basketball competition, contested between national domestic cup champions, running from 30 October 1979, to 19 March 1980. It was contested by 22 teams, two more than in the previous edition.

Emerson Varese defeated the former champions, Gabetti Cantù, in a final held in Milan, winning the FIBA European Cup Winner's Cup for the second time.

== Participants ==
Country	Teams	Clubs	
Italy	2	Emerson Varese	Gabetti Cantù
Belgium	1	Sunair Oostende	
Bulgaria	1	CSKA Sofia	
Cyprus	1	APOEL	
Egypt	1	Union Récréation Alexandria	
England	1	Doncaster Panthers	
Finland	1	Chatby KTP	
France	1	Caen	
Greece	1	Panathinaikos	
Hungary	1	Soproni MAFC	
Iceland	1	KR	
Israel	1	Hapoel Ramat Gan	
Luxembourg	1	Amicale Steinsel	
Netherlands	1	Parker Leiden	
Portugal	1	Sporting	
Romania	1	Steaua București	
Spain	1	FC Barcelona	
Sweden	1	KFUM Uppsala	
Switzerland	1	SAV MoMo	
Turkey	1	Eczacıbaşı	
(Socialist Federal Republic of Yugoslavia) Yugoslavia	1	Zadar	

== First round ==
Team 1	Agg.	Team 2	1st leg	2nd leg
Sporting (Portugal)	0–4*	(Italy) Emerson Varese	0–2	0–2
KFUM Uppsala (Sweden)	190–177	(Switzerland) SAV MoMo	93–67	97–110
KR (Iceland)	158–192	(France) Caen	84–104	74–88
Amicale Steinsel (Luxembourg)	174–204	(Israel) Hapoel Ramat Gan	91–105	83–99
Soproni MAFC (Hungary)	178–206	(Socialist Federal Republic of Yugoslavia) Zadar	104–109	74–97
APOEL (Cyprus)	131–235	(Bulgaria) CSKA Sofia	69–111	62–124
Union Récréation Alexandria (Egypt)	143–213	(Greece) Panathinaikos	68–104	75–109
Steaua București (Romania)	150–153	(Turkey) Eczacıbaşı	71–67	79–86
Doncaster Panthers (England)	149–173	(Belgium) Sunair Oostende	67–73	82–100

*Sporting withdrew before the first leg alleging that six of their players had been selected to join the Portuguese national team in a US Tour, and Emerson Varese received a forfeit (2-0) in both games.

== Second round ==
Team 1	Agg.	Team 2	1st leg	2nd leg
Chatby KTP (Finland)	159–229	(Italy) Emerson Varese	79–105	80–124
KFUM Uppsala (Sweden)	158–168	(France) Caen	73–86	85–82
Hapoel Ramat Gan (Israel)	170–171	(Socialist Federal Republic of Yugoslavia) Zadar	80–75	90–96
CSKA Sofia (Bulgaria)	181–193	(Greece) Panathinaikos	96–93	85–100
Eczacıbaşı (Turkey)	165–157	(Belgium) Sunair Oostende	88–78	77–79

Automatically qualified to the Quarter finals group stage

- (Italy) Gabetti Cantù (title holder)
- (Netherlands) Parker Leiden
- (Spain) FC Barcelona

== Quarterfinals ==
Key to colors
Top two places in each group advance to semifinals

=== Group A ===
	(Italy) CAN	(Netherlands) LEI	(Greece) PAO	(France) CAE
(Italy) CAN		100-86	119-79	96-81
(Netherlands) LEI	112-108		95-86	106-77
(Greece) PAO	103-106	88-86		107-84
(France) CAE	107-112	81-92	84-82	

	Team	Pld	Pts	W	L	PF	PA	PD
1.	(Italy) Gabetti Cantù	6	11	5	1	641	568	+73
2.	(Netherlands) Parker Leiden	6	10	4	2	577	540	+37
3.	(Greece) Panathinaikos	6	8	2	4	545	574	-29
4.	(France) Caen	6	7	1	5	514	595	-81

=== Group B ===
	(Italy) VAR	(Spain) FCB	(Socialist Federal Republic of Yugoslavia) ZAD	(Turkey) ECZ
(Italy) VAR		106-86	120-92	110-72
(Spain) FCB	70-68		120-86	92-69
(Socialist Federal Republic of Yugoslavia) ZAD	67-84	96-90		92-82
(Turkey) ECZ	69-83	84-89	94-85	

	Team	Pld	Pts	W	L	PF	PA	PD
1.	(Italy) Emerson Varese	6	11	5	1	571	456	+115
2.	(Spain) FC Barcelona	6	10	4	2	547	509	+38
3.	(Socialist Federal Republic of Yugoslavia) Zadar	6	8	2	4	518	590	-72
4.	(Turkey) Eczacıbaşı	6	7	1	5	470	551	-81

== Semifinals ==
Team 1	Agg.	Team 2	1st leg	2nd leg
Parker Leiden (Netherlands)	174–184	(Italy) Emerson Varese	87–89	87–95
FC Barcelona (Spain)	166–171	(Italy) Gabetti Cantù	92–93	74–78

== Final ==
March 19, Palasport di San Siro, Milan

Team 1	Score	Team 2
Emerson Varese (Italy)	90–88	(Italy) Gabetti Cantù

1979–80 FIBA European Cup Winners' Cup Champions

Emerson Varese
2nd title
