= David Chiotti =

Italian-American basketball player

Personal information
- Born: 9 September 1984 (age 42) San Jose, California, U.S.
- Listed height: 6 ft 9 in (2.06 m)
- Listed weight: 253 lb (115 kg)

Career information
- High school: Saint Francis (Mountain View, California)
- College: New Mexico (2002–2006)
- NBA draft: 2006: undrafted
- Playing career: 2006–2014
- Position: Center / power forward
- Number: 13

Career history
- 2006–2007: Sankt Pölten
- 2007–2009: ZZ Leiden
- 2009–2012: AS Junior Casale
- 2012–2014: Olimpia Milano
- 2014: Brindisi

Career highlights
- LBA All-Star (2012); All-Dutch League Team (2009); 2× Dutch League All-Star (2008, 2009); All-MW Second Team (2006); All-MW Third Team (2005)

David Chiotti (born 9 September 1984) is an Italian-American retired basketball player. Over the course of his career, Chiotti played in nine games for the Italian national basketball team.

== College basketball ==
From 2002 to 2006, Chiotti played college basketball for the New Mexico Lobos. He showed steady improvement each year, and became the ninth player in school history to record over 1,100 points and 600 rebounds.

== Later years ==
In 2017, Chiotti was hired as the Director of Player Development for the New Mexico Lobos men's basketball team.
