= 2025 BNXT Supercup =

Filou Oostende	Heroes Den Bosch
Belgium	Netherlands
102	81
- Date: 20 September 2025; 20:30
- Venue: COREtec Dôme, Ostend

The 2025 BNXT Supercup was the 4th edition of the BNXT Supercup, the supercup of the BNXT League. The game was played on 20 September 2025 in the COREtec Dôme in Ostend. Filou Oostende won its fourth consecutive supercup.

== Venue ==
Ostend	2025 BNXT Supercup (Belgium)
COREtec Dôme	2025 BNXT Supercup (Belgium)
Capacity: 5,000	2025 BNXT Supercup (Belgium)

== Match details ==
20 September 2025	Filou Oostende (Belgium)	102–81	(Netherlands) Heroes Den Bosch	Ostend
20:00	Scoring by quarter: 25–20, 31–24, 19–10, 27–27
	Pts: Yaacov 27; Rebs: Gillet 7 Asts: Estrada 7	Boxscore	Pts: Veinot 20; Rebs: Withers 9 Asts: Kloof 4	Arena: COREtec Dôme
