= Dylon Cormier =

American professional basketball player

Free agent
- Position: Shooting guard

Personal information
- Born: September 23, 1992 (age 34) Baltimore, Maryland, U.S.
- Listed height: 6 ft 2 in (1.88 m)
- Listed weight: 181 lb (82 kg)

Career information
- High school: Cardinal Gibbons (Baltimore, Maryland)
- College: Loyola (Maryland) (2010–2014)
- NBA draft: 2014: undrafted
- Playing career: 2014–present

Career history
- 2014–2015: ZZ Leiden
- 2016–2017: DMV Warriors
- 2017–2019: Jacksonville Giants

Career highlights
- DBL Sixth Man of the Year (2015); 2× ABA champion (2019)

Dylon Cormier (born September 23, 1992) is an American professional basketball player. Cormier usually plays as shooting guard. He played collegiate for Loyola University Maryland from 2011 to 2014.

== Professional career ==
In September 2014, Cormier signed his first professional contract in the Netherlands with ZZ Leiden. Cormier won the DBL Sixth Man of the Year award in his rookie season.

During the 2016–17 season, Cormier played for the DMV Warriors of the ABA.
