= BeNeLux Cup =

- Sport: Basketball
- Founded: 1987
- Folded: 1988
- Country: Netherlands; Belgium; Luxembourg
- Continent: Europe
- Most titles: Sunair Oostende (1 title)

The BeNeLux Cup was a basketball tournament that was held in 1987–1988. Sunair Oostende won the only edition of the BeNeLux Cup, in which clubs from the Netherlands, Belgium, and Luxembourg participated.

== Editions ==
Season	Winner	Score	Runner-up	Venue
1987–88	(Belgium) Sunair Oostende	65–65 / 84–72	(Netherlands) Direktbank Den Helder	Ostend, Den Helder
