= 1980–81 FIBA European Cup Winners' Cup =

- League: FIBA European Cup Winners' Cup
- Sport: Basketball

Finals
- Champions: (Italy) Squibb Cantù
- Runners-up: (Spain) FC Barcelona

FIBA European Cup Winners' Cup seasons
- ← 1979–80 1981–82 →

The 1980–81 FIBA European Cup Winners' Cup was the fifteenth edition of FIBA's 2nd-tier level European-wide professional club basketball competition, contested between national domestic cup champions, running from 7 October 1980, to 18 March 1981. It was contested by 20 teams, two less than in the previous edition.

Squibb Cantù defeated FC Barcelona, in the final held in Rome, winning the FIBA European Cup Winner's Cup for a (European record) fourth time.

== Participants ==
Country	Teams	Clubs	
Italy	2	Squibb Cantù	Turisanda Varese
Austria	1	Klosterneuburg	
Belgium	1	Verviers-Pepinster	
Bulgaria	1	Levski-Spartak	
Cyprus	1	AEL	
Egypt	1	Union Récréation Alexandria	
England	1	Doncaster Panthers	
Finland	1	Peli-Karhut	
France	1	Moderne	
Greece	1	Olympiacos	
Hungary	1	Soproni MAFC	
Iceland	1	Valur	
Israel	1	Hapoel Ramat Gan	
Netherlands	1	Parker Leiden	
Norway	1	Sandvika	
Soviet Union	1	Žalgiris	
Spain	1	FC Barcelona	
Turkey	1	Efes Pilsen	
(Socialist Federal Republic of Yugoslavia) Yugoslavia	1	Cibona	

== First round ==
Team 1	Agg.	Team 2	1st leg	2nd leg
AEL (Cyprus)	134–202	(Bulgaria) Levski-Spartak	65–102	69-100
Sandvika (Norway)	124–123	(Finland) Peli-Karhut	60–60	64–63
Hapoel Ramat Gan (Israel)	184–188	(Netherlands) Parker Leiden	97–96	87–92
Olympiacos (Greece)	125–138	(Belgium) Verviers-Pepinster	58–67	67–71
Union Récréation Alexandria (Egypt)	59–88	(France) Moderne	59–86	0–2*
Klosterneuburg (Austria)	152–146	(Hungary) Soproni MAFC	88–63	64–83
Valur (Iceland)	169–230	(Socialist Federal Republic of Yugoslavia) Cibona	79–110	90–120

*Union Récréation Alexandria withdrew before the second leg and Moderne received a forfeit (2-0).

== Second round ==
Team 1	Agg.	Team 2	1st leg	2nd leg
Levski-Spartak (Bulgaria)	155–157	(Turkey) Efes Pilsen	73–66	82-91
Sandvika (Norway)	135–215	(Soviet Union) Žalgiris	68–101	67–114
Parker Leiden (Netherlands)	176–143	(Belgium) Verviers-Pepinster	93–73	83–70
Doncaster Panthers (England)	138–152	(France) Moderne	78–66	60–86
Klosterneuburg (Austria)	149–168	(Socialist Federal Republic of Yugoslavia) Cibona	74–84	75–84

Automatically qualified to the Quarter finals group stage

- (Italy) Turisanda Varese (title holder)
- (Italy) Squibb Cantù
- (Spain) FC Barcelona

== Quarterfinals ==
Key to colors
Top two places in each group advance to semifinals

=== Group A ===
	(Spain) FCB	(Italy) VAR	(Netherlands) LEI	(Turkey) EFE
(Spain) FCB		76-68	105-90	104-66
(Italy) VAR	102-88		92-74	88-69
(Netherlands) LEI	76-97	85-84		91-72
(Turkey) EFE	66-100	74-84	86-90	

	Team	Pld	Pts	W	L	PF	PA	PD
1.	(Spain) FC Barcelona	6	11	5	1	570	468	+102
2.	(Italy) Turisanda Varese	6	10	4	2	518	466	+52
3.	(Netherlands) Parker Leiden	6	9	3	3	506	536	-30
4.	(Turkey) Efes Pilsen	6	6	0	6	433	557	-124

=== Group B ===
	(Italy) CAN	(Socialist Federal Republic of Yugoslavia) CIB	(France) MOD	(Soviet Union) ŽAL
(Italy) CAN		99-81	86-72	94-59
(Socialist Federal Republic of Yugoslavia) CIB	98-99		86-84	107-77
(France) MOD	86-96	81-82		111-87
(Soviet Union) ŽAL	75-82	75-82	93-87	

	Team	Pld	Pts	W	L	PF	PA	PD
1.	(Italy) Squibb Cantù	6	12	6	0	556	471	+85
2.	(Socialist Federal Republic of Yugoslavia) Cibona	6	10	4	2	536	515	+21
3.	(France) Moderne	6	7	1	5	521	530	-9
4.	(Soviet Union) Žalgiris	6	7	1	5	466	563	-97

== Semifinals ==
Team 1	Agg.	Team 2	1st leg	2nd leg
FC Barcelona (Spain)	167–164	(Socialist Federal Republic of Yugoslavia) Cibona	92–85	75–79
Turisanda Varese (Italy)	149–172	(Italy) Squibb Cantù	84–94	65–78

== Final ==
March 18, Palaeur, Rome

Team 1	Score	Team 2
Squibb Cantù (Italy)	86–82	(Spain) FC Barcelona

1980–81 FIBA European Cup Winners' Cup Champions

Squibb Cantù
4th title
