= DBL Sixth Man of the Year =

The DBL Sixth Man of the Year is an award that is handed out to the best player that comes off the bench in the Dutch Basketball League, the highest tier of basketball in the Netherlands. The award was handed out for the first time after the 2013–14 season.

== Winners ==
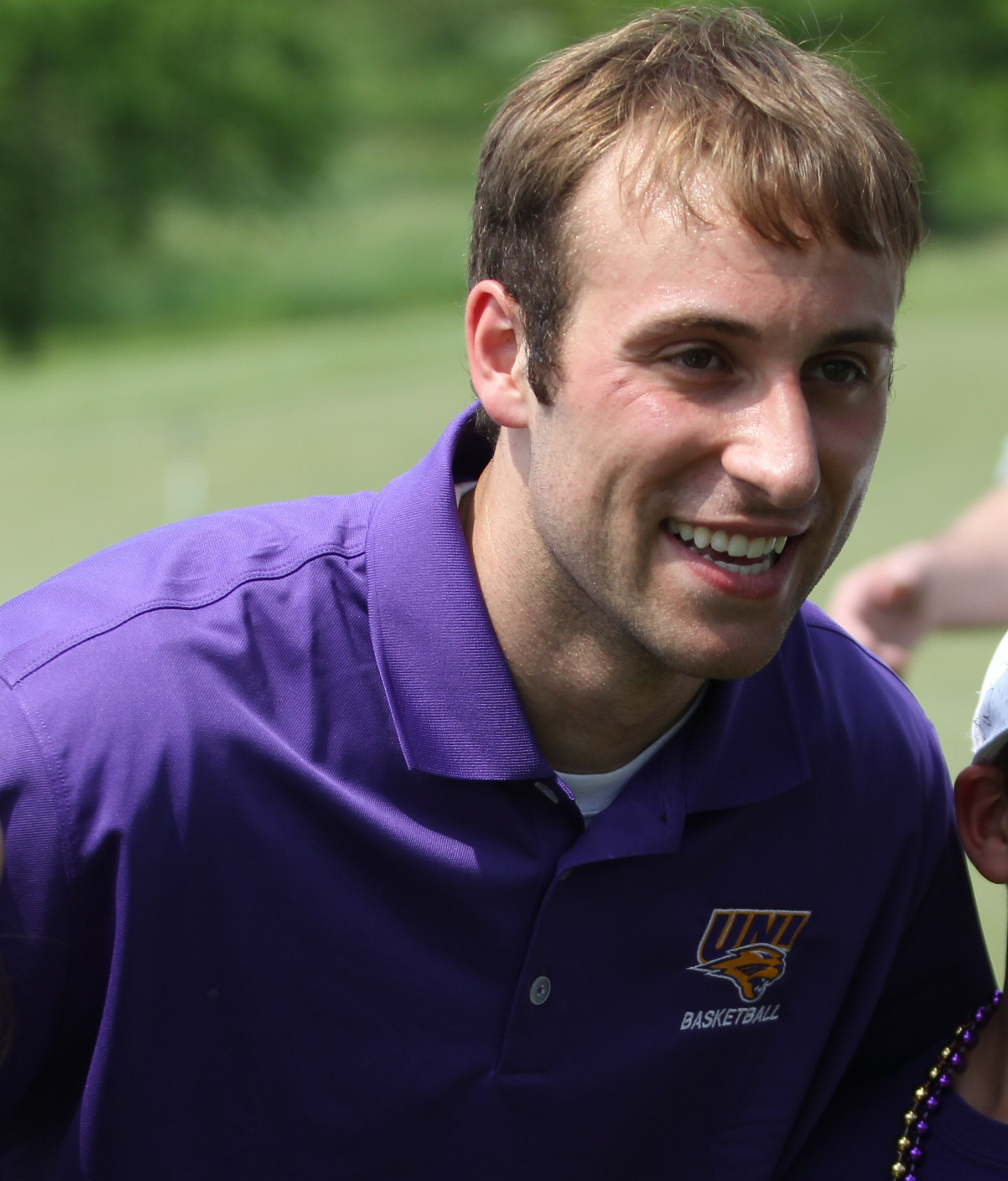
Ali Farokhmanesh won the inaugural award in 2014

Key
Player (X)	Name of the player and number of times they had won the award at that point (if more than one)
†	Indicates multiple award winners in the same season
‡	Denotes the club were DBL champions in the same season
^	Denotes player who is still active in the DBL

Season	Player	Position	Nationality	Club	Ref.
2013–14	Ali Farokhmanesh	Guard	United States	SPM Shoeters Den Bosch	
2014–15	Dylon Cormier	Guard	United States	ZZ Leiden	
2015–16	Rogier Jansen	Guard	Netherlands	ZZ Leiden	
2016–17	Arvin Slagter	Guard	Netherlands	Donar^{‡}	
2017–18	Arvin Slagter (2)	Guard	Netherlands	Donar	
2018–19	Sergio De Randamie^	Forward	Suriname	ZZ Leiden	
2020–21	Riley LaChance^	Guard	United States	ZZ Leiden	
