= Ali Farokhmanesh =

American basketball player (born 1988)

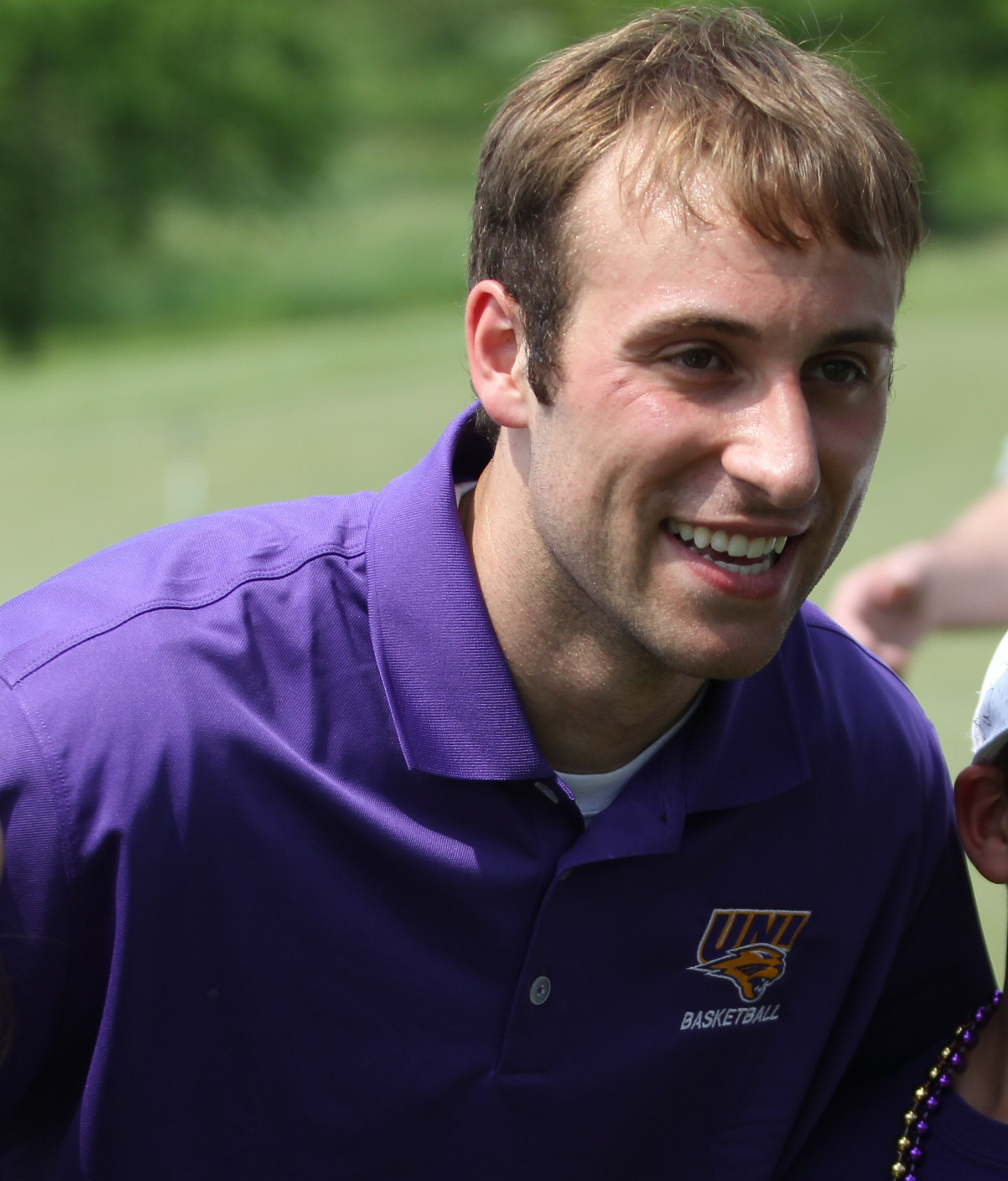
- Farokhmanesh in 2011

Colorado State Rams
- Title: Head coach
- League: Pac-12

Personal information
- Born: April 16, 1988 (age 38) Ogden, Utah, U.S.
- Listed height: 6 ft 0 in (1.83 m)
- Listed weight: 190 lb (86 kg)

Career information
- High school: Iowa City West (Iowa City, Iowa)
- College: Indian Hills CC (2006–2007); Kirkwood CC (2007–2008); Northern Iowa (2008–2010)
- NBA draft: 2010: undrafted
- Playing career: 2010–2014
- Position: Shooting guard / point guard
- Number: 5
- Coaching career: 2017–present

Career history

Playing
- 2010–2011: SAM Massagno
- 2011–2013: WBC Raiffeisen Wels
- 2013–2014: SPM Shoeters Den Bosch

Coaching
- 2014–2016: Nebraska (GA)
- 2016–2017: Nebraska (Dir. of Player Development)
- 2017–2018: Drake (assistant)
- 2018–2024: Colorado State (assistant)
- 2024–2025: Colorado State (associate HC)
- 2025–present: Colorado State

Career highlights
- DBL Sixth Man of the Year (2014); Dutch Supercup (2013)

Ali Fredrick Farokhmanesh (Persian: علی فردریک فرخ‌منش, born April 16, 1988) is an American former professional basketball player and current head coach of the Colorado State Rams men's basketball team.

== Early life ==
Ali Fredrick Farokhmanesh was born on April 16, 1988 in Ogden, Utah, to Cindy (née Fredrick) and Mashallah Farokhmanesh. His father was born in Borujerd, Iran, and played for the Iranian men's national volleyball team before immigrating to the United States in 1977, where he continued to play and coach professionally. His mother is a Division I college volleyball coach.

He spent much of his early life in Pullman, Washington, where his parents coached the Washington State Cougars women's volleyball team. As a child, Farokhmanesh played both basketball and volleyball but soon lost interest in the latter, as he viewed it as female-dominated. (Note: In the United States, volleyball as a high school sport is much more popular among girls than boys, with a 2022 survey noting an almost 7:1 ratio of female to male high school volleyball players.) In 2004, the family moved to Iowa after his parents took jobs coaching the Iowa Hawkeyes; he attended West High School in Iowa City.

== College career ==
Farokhmanesh initially received no scholarship offers. Wishing to eventually play at the Division I level, he enrolled at Indian Hills Community College in 2006, but left after one season in the hopes of obtaining a walk-on position at Iowa. Iowa was uninterested. He considered quitting basketball after being rejected, but eventually decided to transfer to Kirkwood Community College, where he intensified his training routine significantly. While at Kirkwood, he led the team in scoring and assists, and caught the eye of Division I coaches after a 35-point performance against his former club Indian Hills.

Farokhmanesh subsequently received 15 scholarship offers, ultimately choosing to join the Northern Iowa Panthers. He helped the Panthers clinch a spot in the 2009 NCAA Division I men's basketball tournament by beating Illinois State to win the Missouri Valley Conference. The Panthers lost to Purdue in the first round.

Farokhmanesh gained nationwide fame in the 2010 tournament, when he hit a crucial three-point shot to help UNI upset top-overall seed Kansas in the second round.

Farokhmanesh played a total of 69 college games in two years and started all of them. His heroics in 2010, which came two days after hitting the game-winning three-point shot against UNLV in the first round, led to an appearance on the cover of Sports Illustrated.

== Pro career ==
After going undrafted in the 2010 NBA draft, Farokhmanesh signed a deal to play for SAM Massagno Basket, an LNB Division A team based in Massagno, Switzerland.

In 2011, Farokhmanesh signed with the Austrian team WBC Raiffeisen Wels. His contract was renewed in June 2012. Farokhmanesh averaged 13.7 points per game in Austria.

On August 14, 2013, Farokhmanesh signed with SPM Shoeters Den Bosch in the Netherlands. In April, Farokhmanesh won the DBL Sixth Man of the Year award.

== Coaching career ==
In 2014, Farokhmanesh stopped playing professionally, becoming a graduate assistant at Nebraska. In 2016, head coach Tim Miles promoted him to director of player relations and development.

On April 28, 2017, Farokhmanesh joined the Drake men's basketball program as an assistant coach for Niko Medved. On March 26, 2018, he followed Medved to become his assistant at Colorado State University.

On March 26, 2025, Colorado State named Farokhmanesh as head coach, following Medved's departure to Minnesota. He became the 21st head coach in school history.

== Head coaching record ==
Record table
Season	Team	Overall	Conference	Standing	Postseason
Colorado State Rams (Mountain West Conference) (2025–2026)
2025–26	Colorado State	21–13	11–9	T–7th	NIT First Round
Colorado State Rams (Pac-12 Conference) (2026–present)
2026–27	Colorado State	0–0	0–0		
Colorado State:		21–13 (.618)	11–9 (.550)		
Total:		21–13 (.618)			
National champion Postseason invitational champion Conference regular season champion Conference regular season and conference tournament champion Division regular season champion Division regular season and conference tournament champion Conference tournament champion

== Honors ==
(Netherlands) SPM Shoeters Den Bosch

- DBL Sixth Man of the Year (1): 2014
- Dutch Supercup (1): 2013

== Personal life ==
Farokhmanesh is married to former Iowa Hawkeyes volleyball player Mallory Husz. They have three sons and a daughter.

Amid the cancellation of the 2020 NCAA tournament and all NCAA-sponsored spring sports due to the COVID-19 pandemic, Farokhmanesh re-created his famous NCAA tournament shot with his family in an empty Moby Arena on March 20, 2020, marking the 10th anniversary of the UNI–Kansas game. The shot was captured in a web video posted by Colorado State on its official athletics Twitter account.

== Statistics ==
Legend
GP	Games played	MPG	Minutes per game	FG%	Field goal percentage
3P%	3-point field goal percentage	FT%	Free throw percentage	RPG	Rebounds per game
APG	Assists per game	SPG	Steals per game	BPG	Blocks per game
PPG	Points per game	**Bold**	Career high		Led the league

Regular season

Year	Team	League	GP	MPG	FG%	3P%	FT%	RPG	APG	SPG	BPG	PPG
2010–11	(Switzerland) SAM Massagno Basket	LNBA	30	33.9	.**543**	.480	.**865**	2.2	3.1	**2.3**	0.0	**19.5**
2011–12	(Austria) WBC Raiffeisen Wels	ÖBL	**36**	29.3	.497	.**497**	.761	1.9	3.4	0.8	0.0	13.6
2012–13	(Austria) WBC Raiffeisen Wels	ÖBL	32	**34.7**	.505	.415	.828	**3.5**	**3.9**	1.3	0.0	13.7
2013–14	(Netherlands) SPM Shoeters Den Bosch	DBL	35	26.0	.506	.376	.818	1.6	2.0	1.0	0.0	9.8
