= Veselin Petrović (basketball) =

Serbian basketball player (born 1977)

OKK Beograd
- Title: Assistant coach
- League: Basketball League of Serbia

Personal information
- Born: 1 July 1977 (age 49) Sarajevo, SR Bosnia and Herzegovina, SFR Yugoslavia
- Listed height: 1.96 m (6 ft 5 in)
- Listed weight: 109 kg (240 lb)

Career information
- NBA draft: 1999: undrafted
- Playing career: 1993–2014
- Position: Small forward / shooting guard
- Number: 4, 5, 7, 10
- Coaching career: 2015–present

Career history

Playing
- 1993–1995: Vojvodina
- 1995–1999: FMP Železnik
- 1999–2002: Partizan
- 2002–2003: FMP Železnik
- 2003–2004: Budućnost Podgorica
- 2004–2005: Verviers-Pepinster
- 2005–2014: Oostende

Coaching
- 2015–2019: Mega Basket (assistant)
- 2019–2021: Mega Basket U16
- 2021–present: OKK Beograd (assistant)

Career highlights
- YUBA League champion (2002); 4× Yugoslav Cup winner (1997, 2000, 2002, 2003); 4× Belgian League champion (2006, 2007, 2012, 2013); 3× Belgian Cup winner (2008, 2010, 2013); No. 10 retired by Oostende
Medals
Men's basketball
Representing FR Yugoslavia
FIBA EuroBasket
Gold medal – first place	2001 Turkey	Team
'22 & under' European Championship
Gold medal – first place	1998 Italy	Team
'22 & under' World Championship
Bronze medal – third place	1997 Australia	Team

Veselin Petrović (Serbian Cyrillic: Веселин Петровић; born 1 July 1977) is a Serbian professional basketball coach and former player. He currently works as an assistant coach for OKK Beograd of the Basketball League of Serbia.

== Playing career ==
Petrović grew up with the Bosna Sarajevo youth teams. In 1993, he moved to KK Vojvodina, where he played for two seasons. He then moved to FMP Železnik, where he played for 4 years. In 1999, he signed with Partizan Belgrade, where he won three trophies. Later, he played another season with FMP Železnik, and one season with Budućnost. In 2004, he went to Belgium and played one season with Verviers-Pepinster. He then moved to the Belgian club Oostende, where he played until 2014.

=== Trophies won ===
Petrović was a member of the senior men's FR Yugoslavia national basketball team at the EuroBasket 2001, where he won a gold medal. With Partizan Belgrade, he won the 2001–02 season Yugoslav National League championship. In 2000 and 2002, he won the Serbian Cup. With FMP Železnik, he also won the Serbian Cup in 1997. With Oostende, where he began playing in 2005, he won the Belgian League championship in 2006, 2007, 2012, and 2013. He also won the Belgian Cup in 2008, 2010, and 2013.

== Coaching career ==
Petrović worked as an assistant coach of the Serbian team Mega Bemax from 2015 to 2019. On July 5, 2019, he was named the U16 team coach for Mega Bemax.

On 26 May 2021, OKK Beograd named Petrović their new assistant coach.
