= Sportcomplex 1574 =

Sports indoor hall in Leiden, the Netherlands

- Interactive map of Sportcomplex 1574
- Address: Telderskade 399, 2321 TR; Leiden; Netherlands
- Owner: Municipality of Leiden
- Operator: Municipality of Leiden
- Capacity: 2,435
- Field size: 10,000 m2

Construction
- Built: 2020–2023
- Opened: 7 October 2023
- Cost: €24 million
- Architect: Sylvie van Beek

Tenant
- ZZ Leiden (BNXT League) (2023–present)

Website
- Link

The Sportcomplex 1574 is an indoor arena located in Leiden, the Netherlands. The indoor hall serves as home arena for professional basketball club ZZ Leiden, and is used for various middle and high schools as gym as well. The arena replaced the outdated Vijf Meihal and is located at the Telderskade.

== Planning and construction ==
Talks around a new arena for ZZ Leiden had been ongoing for years, and the municipality agreed on demolishing the outdated Vijf Meihal and 3 Oktoberhal and on building a new indoor hall in 2018.

Construction began in 2022 and costed approximately €24 million. There had been discussions between the municipality of Leiden and ZZ Leiden regarding the attendance capacity of the planned arena. The basketball club insisted on building a hall with a capacity of at least 3,000, in order to meet FIBA regulations to play international games in the Basketball Champions League. Eventually, in 2018, the municipality decided to build the arena with a capacity for 2,435 people.

The official name was announced in December 2022, after a survey among 500 Leiden citizens, and refers to the year in which the city was liberated following the Siege of Leiden. Its indoor hall was named "Aad van der Luithal".

The indoor hall was officially inaugurated on 7 October 2023 with a game between ZZ Leiden and BCM Gravelines-Dunkerque in the FIBA Europe Cup.
