= Arūnas Mikalauskas =

Lithuanian basketball player (born 1997

No. 0 – BC Gargždai
- Position: Small forward / power forward
- League: LKL

Personal information
- Born: 14 September 1997 (age 29) Klaipėda, Lithuania
- Listed height: 204 cm (6 ft 8 in)
- Listed weight: 98 kg (216 lb)

Career information
- NBA draft: 2019: undrafted
- Playing career: 2016–present

Career history
- 2016–2019: Neptūnas
- 2019–2020: Aris Leeuwarden
- 2020–2021: Feyenoord
- 2021–2022: ZZ Leiden
- 2022–2023: Crailsheim Merlins
- 2023–2024: Stal Ostrów Wielkopolski
- 2024–2025: Nevėžis Kėdainiai
- 2025–2026: Heroes Den Bosch
- 2026–present: BC Gargždai

Career highlights
- BNXT League champion (2022); All-DBL Team (2021); 2× Dutch Supercup champion (2021, 2025)

Arūnas Mikalauskas (born 14 September 1997) is a Lithuanian professional basketball player for BC Gargždai of the Lithuanian Basketball League (LKL). Standing at 203 cm (6 ft 8 in), he plays as small forward.

== Professional career ==
Born in Klaipėda, Mikalauskas started his career with his hometown team Neptūnas and the Vladas Knašius Basketball School.

In 2019, Mikalauskas signed with Dutch side Aris Leeuwarden. He averaged 12.8 points and 8.1 rebounds before the season was cancelled due to the COVID-19 pandemic. With Aris, he also reached the final of the NBB Cup, which was never played.

In the 2020–21 season, Mikalauskas played with Feyenoord Basketball. This became his breakout season as he averaged 18.1 points and 7.1 rebounds per game while leading Feyenoord to a fifth place. After the regular season, Mikalauskas was named to the All-DBL Team.

On July 7, 2021, he has signed with ZZ Leiden in the Dutch Basketball League (DBL).

On July 4, 2022, he has signed with Crailsheim Merlins of the Basketball Bundesliga (BBL).

On July 18, 2023, he signed with Stal Ostrów Wielkopolski of the Polish Basketball League (PLK).

On December 18, 2024, Mikalauskas returned to Lithuania and signed with Nevėžis Kėdainiai of the Lithuanian Basketball League (LKL).

On July 3, 2025, he signed with Heroes Den Bosch of the BNXT League.

On July 22, 2026, Mikalauskas signed with BC Gargždai of the Lithuanian Basketball League (LKL).
