= 2021 Dutch Basketball Supercup =

Dutch basketball match

ZZ Leiden	BAL
87	74
- Date: 19 September 2021; 15:00 GMT+2
- Venue: Vijf Meihal, Leiden
- Attendance: 500

The 2021 Dutch Basketball Supercup was the 9th edition of the Dutch Basketball Supercup. The game was played in the Vijf Meihal in Leiden.

The game featured ZZ Leiden, the defending champions of the Dutch Basketball League, and BAL, the winners of the 2021 DBL Cup. Leiden won the game 87–74 for 500 people in its home arena.

== Match details ==
19 September 2021	ZZ Leiden	87–74	BAL	Leiden
15:00 GMT+2	Scoring by quarter: 20–24, 25–14, 23–18, 19–18
	Pts: Dunn 20; Rebs: Mikalauskas, Midtgaard 8 Asts: Mikalauskas, Ververs 6	Boxscore	Pts: Hudson 20; Rebs: Hudson 7 Asts: Van Overbeek 9	Arena: Vijf Meihal; Attendance: 500

Leiden / BAL
