= BNXT Supercup =

Basketball Supercup

- Organising body: BNXT League
- Founded: 2021
- First season: 2021
- Country: Belgium; Netherlands
- Number of teams: 2
- Related competitions: BNXT League; Dutch Basketball Supercup; Belgian Basketball Supercup
- Current champions: Antwerp Giants (1st title) (2026)
- Most championships: Oostende (4 titles)
- Website: bnxtleague.com
- 2025 BNXT Supercup

The BNXT Supercup is the super cup competition of the BNXT League, the top basketball in the Netherlands and Belgium. The super cup match is played by the Dutch champions and the Belgian champions of the previous season. The first Supercup was held on September 11, 2021. Filou Oostende won the inaugural title.

== Performance by club ==
Teams shown in italics are defunct.

Club	Wins	Losses	Seasons won
Oostende	4	–	2021, 2022, 2023, 2025
Antwerp Giants	1	–	2026
ZZ Leiden	–	2	
Heroes Den Bosch	–	2	
Landstede Hammers	–	1	

== Finals ==
Year	Dutch champions	Score	Belgian champions	Venue
2021	ZZ Leiden	68–90	Oostende	Maaspoort, 's-Hertogenbosch
2022	Heroes Den Bosch	82–90	Oostende (2)	COREtec Dôme, Ostend
2023	ZZ Leiden	59–89	Oostende (3)	Vijf Meihal, Leiden
2024	Cancelled ^{1}			
2025	Heroes Den Bosch	81–102	Oostende (4)	COREtec Dôme, Ostend
2026	Landstede Hammers	76–83 (OT)	Antwerp Giants	Landstede Sportcentrum, Zwolle

^1 The BNXT League decided not to organize a BNXT Supercup in the 2024–25 season due to a busy calendar and a competition that starts in mid-September.

== Statistics ==
=== Top scorers ===
Season	Finals top scorer	Club	Points scored	Ref.
2021	(United States) Jhonathan Dunn	ZZ Leiden	22	
2022	(United States) Breein Tyree	Filou Oostende	35	
2023	(Belgium) Pierre-Antoine Gillet	Filou Oostende	21	
2024	Not awarded^{1}			
2025	(Denmark) (Israel) Noam Yaacov	Filou Oostende	27	
2026	(United States) Nijel Pack	Antwerp Giants	21	

== See also ==
- BNXT League
