= 2022 BNXT Supercup =

2022 basketball competition

Filou Oostende	Heroes Den Bosch
Belgium	Netherlands
90	82
- Date: 17 September 2022; 20:30
- Venue: COREtec Dôme, Ostend
- Attendance: 1,500

The 2022 BNXT Supercup was the 2nd edition of the BNXT Supercup, the supercup of the BNXT League. The game was played on 17 September 2022 in the COREtec Dôme in Ostend. Filou Oostende won its second consecutive supercup.

== Match details ==
17 September 2022	Filou Oostende (Belgium)	90–82	(Netherlands) Heroes Den Bosch	Ostend
20:30	Scoring by quarter: 27–19, 26–11, 21–29, 16–23
	Pts: Tyree 35; Rebs: Gillet 8 Asts: Đorđević 4	Boxscore	Pts: Ndow 26; Rebs: Ndow 9 Asts: Naar 9	Arena: COREtec Dôme; Attendance: 1,500; Referees: G. Jacobs, T. Dehondt, J. Kisiingha

Oostende	Den Bosch
