= ZZ Leiden =

Dutch basketball club

Coordinates: 52°08′57.1″N 4°28′35.0″E

- Leagues: BNXT League
- Founded: 23 September 1958; 68 years ago
- History: List: BS Leiden (1958–1967) Mercasol Leiden (1967-1977) Parker Leiden (1977–1983) Elmex Leiden (1983–1986) Zorg en Zekerheid Leiden (2006–present)
- Arena: Sportcomplex 1574
- Capacity: 2,435
- Location: Leiden, Netherlands
- Team colors: Blue, Navy, White, Green
- Main sponsor: Zorg en Zekerheid
- President: Marcel Verburg
- Team manager: Rob van Hooven
- Head coach: Doug Spradley
- Team captain: Roeland Schaftenaar
- Championships: 2 BNXT League; 6 Dutch Championships; 4 Dutch Cups; 5 Dutch Supercups
- Retired numbers: 1 (6)
- Website: www.eredivisiebasketballleiden.nl
Home	Away	Europe

ZZ Leiden Basketball, also known as Zorg en Zekerheid Leiden, is a professional basketball club based in Leiden, the Netherlands. The club plays in the BNXT League, the domestic first tier league. Their home games are played at Sportcomplex 1574.

ZZ Leiden has won the national championship five times, the NBB Cup four times, the Dutch Supercup a record four times and the BNXT championship twice in a row. Leiden was a European Club Winner's Cup semi-finalist in 1980. They also made the semi-finals of the FIBA Europe Cup in 2022.

== History ==
=== The old Leiden team (1958–1986) ===
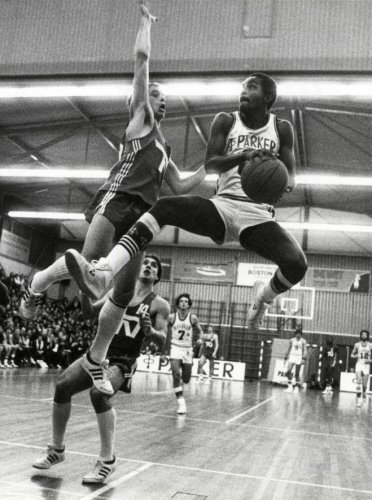
Tony Parker, Sr. (right) going up against René Ridderhof (left), while playing for Parker Leiden in 1980. In the background: Mitchell 'Mitch' Plaat (#7).

On September 23, 1958, the club was founded as Bona Stars by Ton Kallenberg, a physical education professor at a school in Leiden. In 1967 the club entered the eredivisie, the highest professional basketball league in the Netherlands under the name BS Leiden.

When Parker became the main sponsor of the club in 1977 Leiden won its first national championship (1977/1978). During this era the team finished five times as runners-up in the league. In 1979/1980 Leiden reached the semi-finals of the European Club Winner's Cup (later: Saporta Cup, ULEB Cup or EuroCup), their best European result up till now. In 1986, Leiden was forced to leave the eredivisie, due to the absence of a main sponsor. The team played five years in the Promotiedivisie, the highest non-professional league, before pulling out of the Dutch basketball pyramid.

=== The Rise of ZZ (2006–2010) ===
On February 16, 2006, it was announced that Leiden would return at the highest stage in the Netherlands. The team got a new main sponsor in Zorg en Zekerheid and would play its games in the Vijf Meihal.

After being quarter- and semifinalist in a few seasons, Leiden returned to the top of the Netherlands in 2010. Leading players of the ZZ team were Danny Gibson, who was named the DBL Most Valuable Player Award in 2009–10, and Seamus Boxley. The club won its first NBB Cup, by beating ABC Amsterdam in the championship game. In the Semi-final, heavy favorites Groningen were defeated. In the Playoffs Semi-finals, ZZ once again faced Groningen. The team put up a fight against the top seed, but eventually fell short 3–2.

=== Back at the top of Dutch basketball (2010–present) ===
In the 2010–11 season, ZZ Leiden came back on top of the Dutch basketball world as best club. In the regular season, the team finished first. The second DBL title was eventually won, after beating Groningen 4–3 in the Finals. The deciding game 7 turned out to be historic, including three overtimes, which ended in 96–95.

The following year the team its second NBB Cup, but was defeated in the Finals of the DBL. ZZ Leiden also reached the Round of 16 in the EuroChallenge 2011-12 after their second place in the first group stage this season. In 2013 the team got its third national championship, by going undefeated in the play-offs and beating Aris Leeuwarden in the Finals.

The 2013–14 was a struggling one for Leiden. The team ended on the 4th place in the regular season and lost in the Semifinals to Groningen. After the end of the season, Leiden decided to part ways with head coach Toon van Helfteren. Van Helfteren eventually won six trophies with Leiden.

Main sponsor Zorg en Zekerheid extended their contract with 3 years in the 2014 offseason, and a new head coach was signed in Eddy Casteels. In the 2014–15 season, Leiden finished 2nd in the regular season, but once again was eliminated by Groningen in the Semi-finals.

In 2019, Leiden won the NBB Cup after defeating Landstede Zwolle 87–69 in the final.

On 17 May 2020, Leiden signed Geert Hammink as its new head coach for the 2020–21 season. Leiden went on to capture its fourth DBL championship. Star players of the team were league MVP Emmanuel Nzekwesi and Playoffs MVP Worthy de Jong.

Since the 2021–22 season, Leiden plays in the BNXT League, in which the national leagues of Belgium and the Netherlands have been merged. On 11 June 2022, Leiden won the inaugural BNXT championship. De Jong was named the league's Finals MVP and retired from professional basketball after. Leiden also had its best performance in Europe ever, reaching the semifinals of the 2021–22 FIBA Europe Cup.

After the successful season, coach Hammink signed with Skyliners Frankfurt; star player Worthy de Jong retired from professional basketball. In July 2022, Roberts Štelmahers was acquired as the club's new head coach. However, Stelmahers later signed another contract with Nymburk in the Czech Republic, causing Leiden to seek a replacement. On August 15, Leiden signed Doug Spradley as new head coach to a one-year contract.

On 12 March 2023, ZZ Leiden won their fourth-ever Cup title after beating Landstede Hammers 72–70 in the Landstede Sportcentrum. On 29 May 2023, they won their fifth national title following a Game 5 win over Donar, despite trailing by 16 points 2:40 before the ending of the game. Thomas Rutherford scored two game-winning free throws to seal the championship. The win meant that Leiden won its first national double (both the league and cup titles) in club history.

== Arenas ==
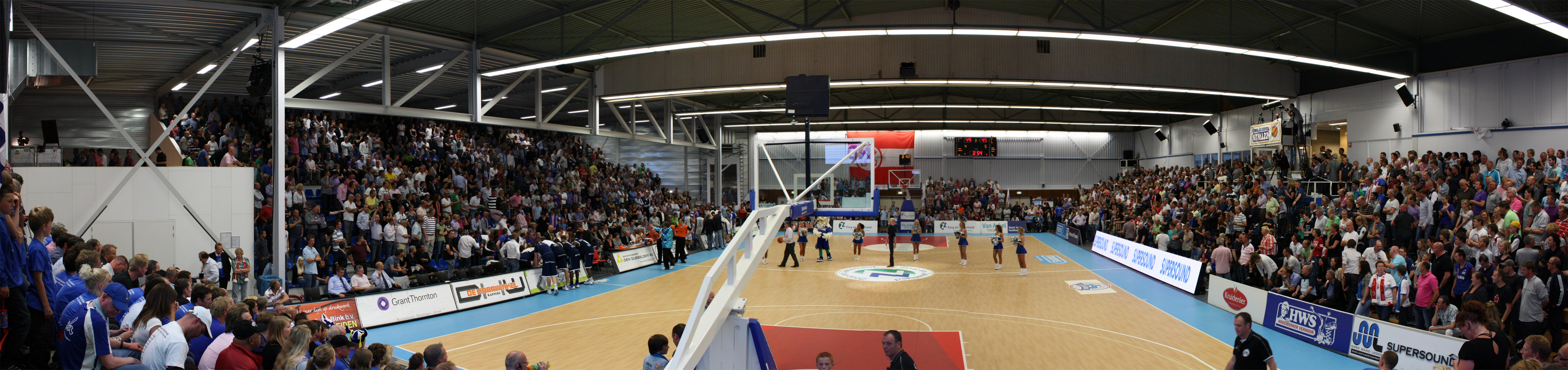
Panorama view of the Vijf Meihal

From its re-inception in 2006 to 2023, Leiden used the Vijf Meihal as its home arena. The arena, which is also used for gymnastics of high school students, is nicknamed De Schuur (The Barn) by ZZ Leiden fans.

- Vijf Meihal (2006–2023)
- Sportcomplex 1574 (2023–present)

=== Move to Sportcomplex 1574 ===
The municipality of Leiden replaced the Vijf Meihal with the newly built Sportcomplex 1574, which was announced to have a capacity of 2,435 people. The new name was later announced to be Sportcomplex 1574, named after the year of the Siege of Leiden after which the city was liberated from Spanish rule. Construction of the €24 million arena began in 2021 and finished in 2023. The sporting hall was named the "Aad van der Luit Topsporthal". The decision by the municipality of Leiden to build was heavily criticized by ZZ Leiden as the number of seats is below FIBA's minimum of 3,000 seats for international games. In its first season, ZZ Leiden was forced to withdraw from the Basketball Champions League because of the size of the Sportcomplex 1574. On 15 October 2023, the inaugural basketball game was played at the arena when Leiden played BCM Gravelines-Dunkerque in the FIBA Europe Cup.

== Logos and names ==
Former logo of the parent club
- Parker Leiden (1977–1983)
- Elmex Leiden (1983–1986)
- Zorg en Zekerheid Leiden (2006–present)

== Club records ==
The list only includes records since ZZ Leiden was established in 2006. Bold denotes still active with team. As of the end of the 2019–20 season:

Most points scored
Player	Points
Worthy de Jong	5,686
Mohamed Kherrazi	2,538
Seamus Boxley	2,429
Arvin Slagter	1,407
Clayton Vette	1,377

Most rebounds
Player	Rebounds
Worthy de Jong	2,231
Mohamed Kherrazi	1,940
Seamus Boxley	1,064
Johan Kuijper	775
David Chiotti	751

Most assists
Player	Assists
Worthy de Jong	1,247
Mohamed Kherrazi	684
Arvin Slagter	540
Rogier Jansen	491
J.S. Nash	445

== Players ==
=== Current roster ===
Note: Flags indicate national team eligibility at FIBA-sanctioned events. Players may hold other non-FIBA nationalities not displayed.

ZZ Leiden roster
Players
Coaches

Pos.	No.	Nat.	Name	Ht.	Age
F	0	(Netherlands)	van Lobbrecht, David	2.00 m (6 ft 7 in)	20 – 1 May 2006
PG	1	(Netherlands)	van Overbeek, Roel	1.90 m (6 ft 3 in)	26 – 7 August 2000
F	2	(Netherlands)	van den Berg, Jairo	2.03 m (6 ft 8 in)	19 – 9 December 2006
G	3	(Netherlands)	Bergens, Jamie	1.86 m (6 ft 1 in)	24 – 15 December 2001
PG	5	(United States)	Graves, Nik	1.88 m (6 ft 2 in)	22 – 29 October 2003
G	8	(United States)	Futrell, Anias	1.96 m (6 ft 5 in)	24 – 30 July 2002
F/C	9	(United States)	Beagle, Jonathan	2.08 m (6 ft 10 in)	23 – 1 January 2003
G	11	(Netherlands)	van Zeil, Loek	1.85 m (6 ft 1 in)	20 – 9 February 2006
F	12	(Netherlands)	Blangé, Joost	2.03 m (6 ft 8 in)	24 – 12 August 2002
PF	13	(Netherlands)	Huurman, Sam	2.05 m (6 ft 9 in)	25 – 11 May 2001
F	22	(Netherlands)	Beelen, Jesper	2.02 m (6 ft 8 in)	18 – 12 August 2008
F/C	25	(Finland)	Tainamo, Touko	2.06 m (6 ft 9 in)	25 – 6 January 2001
PG	32	(Netherlands)	Zuidema, Kjeld	1.93 m (6 ft 4 in)	25 – 21 June 2001

Head coach

- (Serbia) Radenko Varagić

Assistant coach(es)

- (Netherlands) Jan Stalman
- (Netherlands) Michael Meskers
- (Netherlands) Sebastian Lucic

Legend

- **(C)** Team captain
- Injured

- Roster
Updated: October 19, 2026

=== Retired numbers ===
**ZZ Leiden retired numbers**
N°	Player	Position	Tenure	Ceremony date
**6**	Worthy de Jong	SG	2010–2016, 2017–2022	October 22, 2022

=== Notable players ===
Note: Flags indicate national team eligibility at FIBA-sanctioned events. Players may hold other non-FIBA nationalities not displayed.

Criteria

To appear in this section a player must have either:

- Set a club record or won an individual award while at the club
- Played at least one official international match for their national team at any time
- Played at least one official NBA match at any time.

- (Netherlands) Toon van Helfteren
- (Netherlands) Mitchell Plaat
- (Netherlands) Worthy de Jong
- (Netherlands) Thomas Koenis
- (Netherlands) Arvin Slagter
- (Netherlands) Ross Bekkering
- (Netherlands) Jessey Voorn
- (Netherlands) Joshua Duinker
- (Netherlands) Mohamed Kherrazi
- (Suriname) Sergio De Randamie
- (Netherlands) Sean Cunningham
- (Netherlands) Jeroen van der List
- (Netherlands) Marijn Ververs
- (Netherlands) Emmanuel Nzekwesi
- (Finland) Touko Tainamo
- (South Sudan) (United States) Nuni Omot
- (United States) Art Collins
- (United States) Danny Gibson
- (United States) Thomas Jackson
- (United States) Seamus Boxley
- (United States) Darius Thompson
- (United States) Carrington Love
- (United States) Maurice Watson Jr.
- (Italy) David Chiotti
- (Croatia) Drago Pašalić
- (Kenya) Nuni Omot
- (Lithuania) Einaras Tubutis

=== Individual awards ===
BNXT League Dream Team

- Asbjørn Midtgaard – 2022

BNXT League Finals MVP

- Worthy de Jong – 2022
- David Collins – 2023

BNXT League Player of the Year

- Worthy de Jong – 2022

BNXT League Defensive Player of the Year

- Worthy de Jong – 2022

BNXT League Sixth Man of the Year

- Marijn Ververs – 2024

DBL Most Valuable Player

- Art Collins – 1978
- Jerry Beck – 1984
- Toon van Helfteren – 1986
- Danny Gibson – 2010
- Worthy de Jong – 2016
- Darius Thompson – 2019
- Emmanuel Nzekwesi – 2021

DBL All-Star Team

- David Chiotti – 2009
- Danny Gibson – 2010
- Ronny LeMelle – 2010
- Seamus Boxley – 2011, 2012
- Thomas Jackson – 2012
- Worthy de Jong – 2013, 2015, 2016, 2021
- Ross Bekkering – 2013
- Joshua Duinker – 2014
- Carrington Love – 2018
- Maurice Watson, Jr. – 2019
- Darius Thompson – 2019
- Emmanuel Nzekwesi – 2021

DBL Defensive Player of the Year

- Mohamed Kherrazi – 2015, 2016, 2019
- Worthy de Jong – 2021

DBL Sixth Man of the Year

- Dylon Cormier – 2016
- Rogier Jansen – 2017
- Sergio De Randamie – 2019
- Riley LaChance – 2021

DBL Most Improved Player

- Worthy de Jong – 2011

DBL Rookie of the Year

- Joey Schelvis – 2009
- Joshua Duinker – 2014
- Emmanuel Nzekwesi – 2021

DBL Coach of the Year

- Ruud Harrewijn – 1985
- Toon van Helfteren – 2010, 2011, 2012
- Geert Hammink – 2021

== Trophies ==
=== National competitions ===
- **Dutch Basketball League**
  - Winners (6): 1977–78, 2010–11, 2012–13, 2020–21, 2022–23, 2023–24
    - Runners-up (9): 1978–79, 1979–80, 1980–81, 1983–84, 1984–85, 2011–12, 2017–18, 2021–22, 2024–25, 2025–26
- **Dutch Cup**
  - Winners (4): 2009–10, 2011–12, 2018–19, 2022–23
    - Runners-up (3): 2013–14, 2015–16, 2017–18
- **Dutch Supercup**
  - Winners (5): 2011, 2012, 2021, 2023, 2024
    - Runners-up (4): 2013, 2014, 2018, 2019

=== Regional competitions ===
- **BNXT League**
  - Winners (2): 2021–22, 2022–23
- **BNXT Supercup**
  - Runners-up (1): 2021

== Season by season ==
Season	Tier	League	Pos.	Cup	Supercup	BNXT League	European competitions		
1967–68	1	Eredivisie	6th						
1968–69	1	Eredivisie	8th						
1969–70	1	Eredivisie	5th						
1970–71	1	Eredivisie	3rd						
1971–72	1	Eredivisie	8th						
1972–73	1	Eredivisie	6th						
1973–74	1	Eredivisie	7th						
1974–75	1	Eredivisie	5th						
1975–76	1	Eredivisie	10th						
1976–77	1	Eredivisie	10th						
1977–78	1	Eredivisie	1st						
1978–79	1	Eredivisie	2nd				**1** Champions Cup		
1979–80	1	Eredivisie	2nd				**2** Saporta Cup		
1980–81	1	Eredivisie	2nd				**2** Saporta Cup		
1981–82	1	Eredivisie	3rd				**2** Saporta Cup		
1982–83	1	Eredivisie	3rd				**3** Korac Cup		
1983–84	1	Eredivisie	2nd						
1984–85	1	Eredivisie	2nd						
1985–86	1	Eredivisie	4th						
1986–91	Five seasons in Promotiedivisie								
1991–06	Inactivity								
2006–07	1	Eredivisie	8th	Quarterfinalist					
2007–08	1	Eredivisie	9th						
2008–09	1	Eredivisie	8th						
2009–10	1	Eredivisie	3rd	Champion					
2010–11	1	DBL	1st	Champion			**3** EuroChallenge		
2011–12	1	DBL	2nd	Fourth round	Champion		**3** EuroChallenge		
2012–13	1	DBL	1st	Semifinalist	Champion				
2013–14	1	DBL	4th	Runner-up	Runner-up		**3** EuroChallenge		
2014–15	1	DBL	3rd	Semifinalist	Runner–up				
2015–16	1	DBL	3rd	Runner-up			**3** FIBA Europe Cup		
2016–17	1	DBL	3rd	Quarterfinalist					
2017–18	1	DBL	2nd	Runners-up					
2018–19	1	DBL	3rd	Champions	Runner-up		**4** FIBA Europe Cup		
2019–20	1	DBL	5th (Note: The 2019–20 season was curtailed due to the COVID-19 pandemic.)	Quarterfinals	Runner-up		**4** FIBA Europe Cup		
2020–21	1	DBL	1st	Quarterfinals					
2021–22	1	BNXT	2nd	Semifinalist	Champions	Champions	**3** Champions League		
2021–22	1	BNXT	2nd	Semifinalist	Champions	Champions	**4** FIBA Europe Cup		
2022–23	1	BNXT	1st	Winner	Runners-up	Champions	**4** FIBA Europe Cup	QR	1-1
2023–24	1	BNXT	1st	Semifinalist	Champions	Runners-up	**4** FIBA Europe Cup	R2	5-5
2024–25	1	BNXT	2nd	Semifinalist	Champions	12th			
2025–26	1	BNXT	2nd	Quarterfinalist		10th			

== International record ==
ZZ Leiden made its debut in the European stage in 1978 when it entered the European Champions Cup. In 1982, Leiden played in the FIBA Intercontinental Cup, qualifying as hosts of the competition.

Record
Competition	GP	W	D	L	%
**1** FIBA Champions Cup / EuroLeague	6	5	–	1	.833
**2** FIBA Saporta Cup / ULEB Cup / Eurocup	28	16	–	12	.571
**3** Basketball Champions League / Korac Cup / EuroChallenge	32	10	–	22	.313
**4** FIBA Europe Cup (since 2016/2017)	58	29	–	29	.500
Total	124	60	–	64	.484

Key

- (N) = Neutral venue

Season	Competition	Round	Club	Home	Away	Advanced
1978–79	European Champions Cup	RS	(England) Crystal Palace Chevrons	125–89	88–96	
1978–79	European Champions Cup	RS	(Spain) Joventut Badalona	101–89	97–82	
1978–79	European Champions Cup	RS	(Sweden) Södertälje	115–86	76–77	
1979–80	European Cup Winners′ Cup	RS	(France) Caen	106–77	81–92	
1979–80	European Cup Winners′ Cup	RS	(Greece) Panathinaikos	95–86	88–86	
1979–80	European Cup Winners′ Cup	RS	(Italy) Gabetti Cantù	112–108	100–86	
1979–80	European Cup Winners′ Cup	SF	(Italy) Emerson Varese	87–89	95–87	
1980–81	European Cup Winners′ Cup	QR1	(Israel) Hapoel Ramat-Gan	92–87	97–96	
1980–81	European Cup Winners′ Cup	QR2	(Belgium) Verviers-Pepinster	93–73	70–83	
1980–81	European Cup Winners′ Cup	RS	(Italy) Turisanda Varese	85–84	92–74	
1980–81	European Cup Winners′ Cup	RS	(Spain) FC Barcelona	76–97	105–90	
1980–81	European Cup Winners′ Cup	RS	(Turkey) Efes Pilsen	91–72	86–90	
1981–82	European Cup Winners′ Cup	QR1	(Luxembourg) Soleuvre	107–50	57–94	
1981–82	European Cup Winners′ Cup	QR2	(Greece) AEK Athens	102–67	78–89	
1981–82	European Cup Winners′ Cup	RS	(Soviet Union) Stroitel Kyiv	69–72	74–76	
1981–82	European Cup Winners′ Cup	RS	(Czech Republic) Inter Slovnaft Brastislava	86–83	83–96	
1981–82	European Cup Winners′ Cup	RS	(Spain) Real Madrid	90–98	97–90	
1982	FIBA Intercontinental Cup	RS	(Argentina) Ferro Carril Oeste	68–81		**6th (of 6)**
1982	FIBA Intercontinental Cup	RS	(Italy) Cantù	75–92		**6th (of 6)**
1982	FIBA Intercontinental Cup	RS	(Netherlands) EBBC Den Bosch	64–71		**6th (of 6)**
1982	FIBA Intercontinental Cup	RS	(United States) Air Force Falcons	95–86		**6th (of 6)**
1982	FIBA Intercontinental Cup	RS	(Israel) Maccabi Tel Aviv	79–92		**6th (of 6)**
1982–83	Korać Cup	QR1	(Greece) Olympiacos	92–69	71–70	
1982–83	Korać Cup	QR2	(France) Tours	68–67	84–80	
2010–11	EuroChallenge	QR	(Turkey) Karşıyaka	65–87	77–63	
2011–12	EuroChallenge	RS	(Turkey) Beşiktaş Milangaz	58–86	76–69	
2011–12	EuroChallenge	RS	(Georgia (country)) Mgzavrebi-Armia Tbilisi	76–59	74–71	
2011–12	EuroChallenge	RS	(Germany) Göttingen	80–71	71–80	
2011–12	EuroChallenge	T16	(Latvia) Ventspils	57–60	69–73	
2011–12	EuroChallenge	T16	(Germany) EWE Baskets Oldenburg	76–71	85–62	
2011–12	EuroChallenge	T16	(France) Chorale Roanne	63–68	91–56	
2013–14	EuroChallenge	RS	(Finland) Kataja	72–58	77–63	
2013–14	EuroChallenge	RS	(Denmark) Bakken Bears	61–62	79–81	
2013–14	EuroChallenge	RS	(France) Cholet	67–76	74–52	
2015–16	EuroChallenge	RS	(Germany) Skyliners Frankfurt	51–76	63–58	
2015–16	EuroChallenge	RS	(Slovenia) Krka	78–86	79–51	
2015–16	EuroChallenge	RS	(Portugal) FC Porto	77–51	62–70	
2018–19	FIBA Europe Cup	QR1	(Austria) Kapfenberg Bulls	68–57	62–79	
2018–19	FIBA Europe Cup	RS	(Germany) s.Oliver Würzburg	65–75	87–61	
2018–19	FIBA Europe Cup	RS	(Turkey) Sakarya Büyükşehir	99–97	56–59	
2018–19	FIBA Europe Cup	RS	(Romania) Oradea	90–76	72–76	
2018–19	FIBA Europe Cup	R2	(Finland) Kataja	87–72	92–80	
2018–19	FIBA Europe Cup	R2	(Russia) Avtodor Saratov	72–97	105–81	
2018–19	FIBA Europe Cup	R2	(Denmark) Bakken Bears	89–85	111–71	
2018–19	FIBA Europe Cup	R16	(Italy) Dinamo Sassari	93–97	94–68	
2019–20	FIBA Europe Cup	QR1	(Bulgaria) Beroe	108–86	86–71	
2019–20	FIBA Europe Cup	RS	(Portugal) Benfica	84–68	103–99	
2019–20	FIBA Europe Cup	RS	(Slovakia) Inter Bratislava	80–67	79–88	
2019–20	FIBA Europe Cup	RS	(Hungary) Pécsi VSK-Veolia	105–100	87–77	
2019–20	FIBA Europe Cup	R2	(Turkey) Pınar Karşıyaka	65–105	112–67	
2019–20	FIBA Europe Cup	R2	(Turkey) Bahçeşehir Koleji	87–89	93–71	
2019–20	FIBA Europe Cup	R2	(Russia) Enisey	89–83	96–84	
2021–22	Champions League	QR1	(Belgium) Belfius Mons-Hainaut	76–74 (N)		
2021–22	Champions League	QR2	(Belarus) Tsmoki-Minsk	67–69 (N)		
2021–22	FIBA Europe Cup	RS	(Greece) Iraklis Saloniki	71–63	83–92	
2021–22	FIBA Europe Cup	RS	(Montenegro) Mornar Bar	78–73	87–74	
2021–22	FIBA Europe Cup	RS	(Turkey) Bahçeşehir Koleji	69–79	84–61	
2021–22	FIBA Europe Cup	R2	(Germany) Medi Bayreuth	98–93	84–89	
2021–22	FIBA Europe Cup	R2	(Russia) Parma Perm Parimatch	79–75	88–91	
2021–22	FIBA Europe Cup	R2	(Poland) Legia Warsaw	78–90	59–77	
2021–22	FIBA Europe Cup	QF	(Germany) Hakro Merlins Crailsheim	85–77	71–68	
2021–22	FIBA Europe Cup	SF	(Turkey) Bahçeşehir Koleji	71–77	90–82	
2022–23	FIBA Europe Cup	QR1	(Poland) Czarni Słupsk	78–74 (N)		
2022–23	FIBA Europe Cup	QR2	(France) Cholet	59–71 (N)		
2023–24	FIBA Europe Cup	RS	(France) Gravelines Dunkerque	77–69	46–74	
2023–24	FIBA Europe Cup	RS	(Kosovo) Trepça	80–76	84–54	
2023–24	FIBA Europe Cup	R2	(Germany) Niners Chemnitz	58–88	57–78	
2023–24	FIBA Europe Cup	R2	(Italy) Pallacanestro Varese	81–77	82–79	
2023–24	FIBA Europe Cup	R2	(Romania) CSM Oradea	77–82	77–90	

== List of head coaches ==
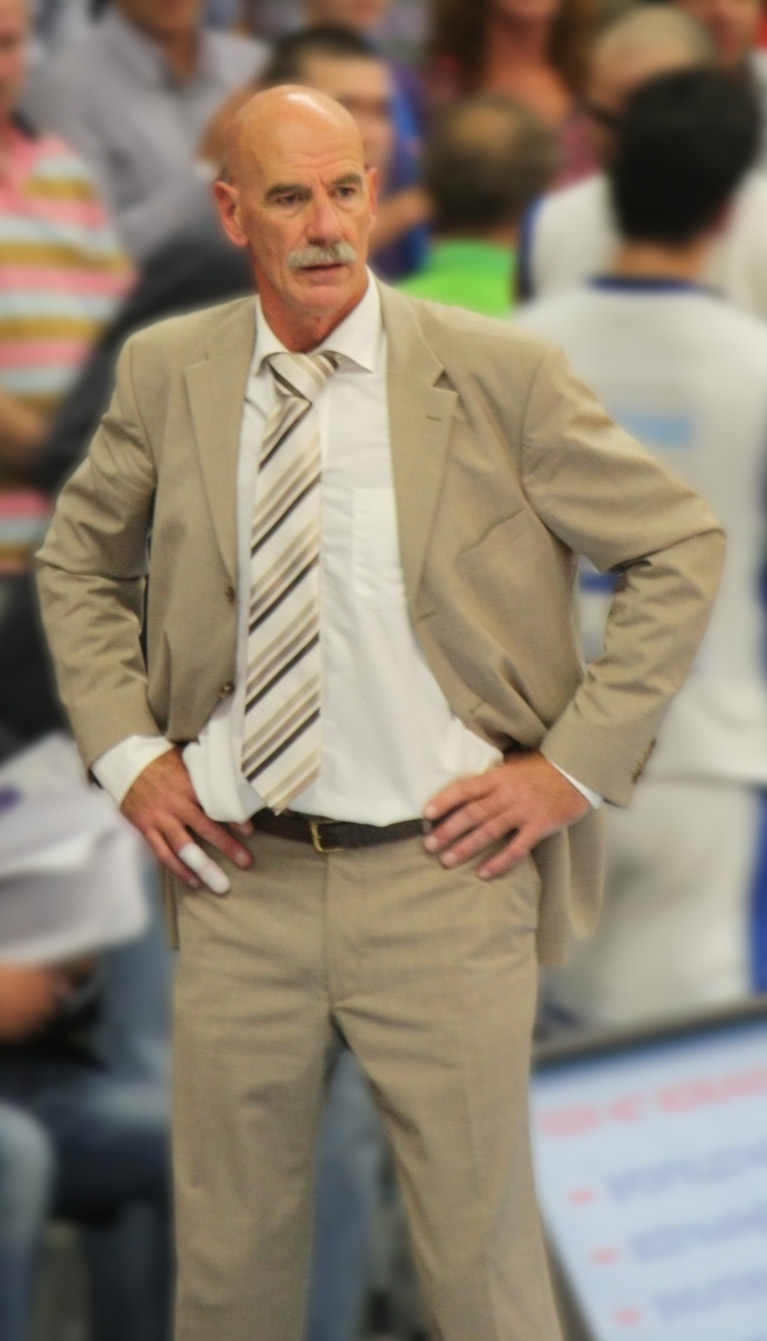
Club symbol Toon van Helfteren played for and coached the team

Coach	From	To	Honours
(Netherlands) Henry Blom	1975	1981	
(Netherlands) Ton Boot	1981		
(Netherlands) Theo Kinsbergen	1982		
(Netherlands) Ruud Harrewijn	1983	1986	
(Netherlands) Ivo Boom	2006	2008	
(Netherlands) Toon van Helfteren	2008	2014	2 Dutch Basketball Leagues, 2 NBB Cups, 2 Dutch Supercups
(Belgium) Eddy Casteels	2014	2016	
(Belgium) Paul Vervaeck	2016	2018	
(Netherlands) Rolf Franke	2018	2020	1 Dutch Cup
(Netherlands) Geert Hammink	2020	2022	1 BNXT League, 1 Dutch Supercup, 1 Dutch Basketball League
(United States) (Germany) Doug Spradley	2022	2026	1 BNXT League, 2 Dutch Basketball Leagues, 1 NBB Cup, 2 Dutch Supercups
(Serbia) Radenko Varagić	2026	present	
