= Asbjørn Midtgaard =

Danish basketball player (born 1997)

Personal information
- Born: 20 September 1997 (age 29) Helsingør, Denmark
- Listed height: 7 ft 0 in (2.13 m)
- Listed weight: 270 lb (122 kg)

Career information
- High school: Espergærde Gymnasium (Espergærde, Denmark)
- College: Wichita State (2017–2020); Grand Canyon (2020–2021)
- NBA draft: 2021: undrafted
- Playing career: 2014–present
- Position: Center
- Number: 33

Career history
- 2014–2017: Hørsholm 79ers
- 2021–2022: ZZ Leiden
- 2022–2023: Crailsheim Merlins
- 2023: Antwerp Giants

Career highlights
- BNXT League champion (2022); BNXT League Dream Team (2022); Dutch Supercup champion (2021); Basketligaen Young Player of the Year (2017); First-team All-WAC (2021); WAC Newcomer of the Year (2021); WAC All-Defensive Team (2021)

Asbjørn Engelhardt Midtgaard (born 20 September 1997) is a Danish professional basketball player. He last played for the Antwerp Giants of the BNXT League. He played college basketball for the Wichita State Shockers and the Grand Canyon Antelopes.

== Early life and career ==
Midtgaard grew up playing handball and football, as well as weightlifting and judo. He started playing basketball at age 14, and joined the Hørsholm 79ers of the Basketligaen, the top professional league in Denmark, three years later. In the 2016–17 season, he averaged 8.6 points and 6.3 rebounds per game and was named Basketligaen Young Player of the Year.

== College career ==
Midtgaard received limited playing time during his three seasons at Wichita State. He averaged 2.7 points and 2.6 rebounds per game in his time with the program. For his senior season, he transferred to Grand Canyon. On 28 November 2020, Midtgaard scored a career-high 20 points in a 94–63 win against Benedictine Mesa. As a senior, Midtgaard averaged 14.2 points, 9.7 rebounds and 1.3 blocks per game, and shot an NCAA Division I-best 70.7 percent from the field. He received First Team All-Western Athletic Conference, Newcomer of the Year and All-Defensive Team honors.

== Professional career ==
After going undrafted in the 2021 NBA draft, Midtgaard signed with the Orlando Magic for the 2021 NBA Summer League. He became the first Grand Canyon player since the program entered the NCAA Division I to be invited to the Summer League.

On 16 August 2021, Midtgaard signed his first professional contract with ZZ Leiden of the BNXT League. He was nominated for the BNXT League Most Valuable Player award and ended third in voting. Midtgaard earned a spot in the All-BNXT League Dream Team.

On 24 June 2022 he signed a deal with the Crailsheim Merlins of the German Basketball Bundesliga. He wrapped up the 2022-23 campaign, averaging 8.1 points and 4.2 rebounds per game in Bundesliga play. On 16 July 2023 Midtgaard was signed by the Antwerp Giants of the BNXT League. He attended only one BNXT contest for Antwerp and parted ways with the team on 4 October 2023 after having suffered a knee injury.

== National team career ==
Midtgaard represented Denmark at the 2015 FIBA Europe Under-18 Championship Division B in Austria, and averaged 7.3 points and 8.4 rebounds per game.

== Career statistics ==
Legend
GP	Games played	GS	Games started	MPG	Minutes per game
FG%	Field goal percentage	3P%	3-point field goal percentage	FT%	Free throw percentage
RPG	Rebounds per game	APG	Assists per game	SPG	Steals per game
BPG	Blocks per game	PPG	Points per game	**Bold**	Career high

*	Led NCAA Division I

=== College ===
Year	Team	GP	GS	MPG	FG%	3P%	FT%	RPG	APG	SPG	BPG	PPG
2017–18	Wichita State	8	0	6.1	.500	–	.500	2.1	.0	.1	.3	1.4
2018–19	Wichita State	**34**	3	11.3	.632	–	.595	3.1	.2	.1	.8	3.9
2019–20	Wichita State	24	1	8.0	.484	–	.333	2.0	.3	.1	.5	1.5
2020–21	Grand Canyon	24	**24**	**28.7**	**.707***	.000	**.718**	**9.7**	**.7**	**.4**	**1.3**	**14.2**
Career		90	28	14.6	.658	.000	.644	4.5	.3	.2	.8	5.8
