= Vijf Meihal =

Dutch arena

- De Schuur (The Barn)
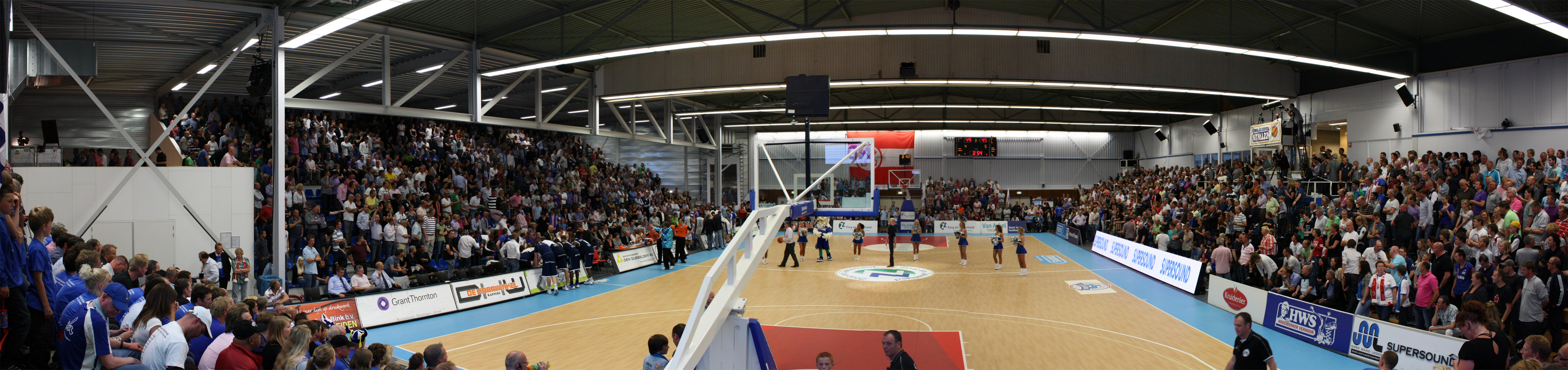
- Panorama of the Vijf Meihal
- Interactive map of Vijf Meihal
- Full name: Vijf Meihal
- Location: Leiden, Netherlands
- Coordinates: 52°08′57.1″N 4°28′35.0″E
- Owner: Municipality
- Operator: Municipality of Leiden
- Capacity: 2,000 (basketball)

Construction
- Groundbreaking: 14 February 1968
- Built: 1968
- Opened: 24 September 1968
- Expanded: 2010
- Cost: 1.5 million Dutch guilder

Tenants
- ZZ Leiden (2006–2023); Dutch national basketball team (2013–2016)

The Vijf Meihal (English: 5 May Hall) is a now-closed sports complex located in the Dutch city of Leiden. It was used as a sports arena since 1968, as the former home base of professional basketball club ZZ Leiden, who used it up until 2024 when they moved to the Sportcomplex 1574.

== History ==
Construction began on 14 February 1968 and was opened on 24 September 1968. The municipality of Leiden built the hall as a temporary venue, as it expected to build another larger sports center soon. The design was inspired by other Swedish sports halls and was considered cheap, as costs were 1.5 million Dutch guilder.

The hall was used for B.S. Leiden's basketball team and was often crowded by 2,500–3,000 supporters, which overflowed the hall's capacity. In 1986, the basketball club dissolved its activities, due to the lack of a major sponsor as well as the limited seating capacity of the Vijf Meihal.

For approximately 20 years, the hall was barely used, until the basketball club was re-founded as ZZ Leiden in 2006.

Until 2010, the Vijf Meihal had a capacity of 700 people. This was expanded to 2,000 people in 2010. The expansion cost somewhere around 500,000 euros and did allow Zorg en Zekerheid Leiden to play in European competitions.

The Dutch national basketball team played a EuroBasket qualification match in the Vijf Meihal on 16 August 2013. The Netherlands played against Portugal and won the match, 71–53. Later the Vijf Meihal became the main arena of the national team.

The complex was mockingly nicknamed De Schuur (English: The Barn) by ZZ Leiden fans.

The municipality of Leiden constructed a new sports hall, the Sportcomplex 1574, which Leiden started using from the 2023–24 season. On 30 September 2024, the hall was closed.
