= BC Oostende =

Belgian basketball club

Coretec Oostende
- Nickname: BCO
- Leagues: BNXT League; Europe Cup
- Founded: 25 May 1970; 56 years ago
- History: List: Sunair Oostende (1970–1999) Telindus Oostende (1999–2008 Base Oostende (2008–2010) Telenet Oostende (2010–2017 Oostende (2017–2018) Filou Oostende (2018–2026) Coretec Oostende (2026–present)
- Arena: COREtec Dôme
- Capacity: 5,000
- Location: Ostend, Belgium
- President: Johan Verborgh
- General manager: Sam Van Rossom
- Head coach: Denis Wucherer
- Team captain: Pierre-Antoine Gillet
- Championships: 26 Belgian Championships; 21 Belgian Cups; 12 Belgian Supercups; 1 BNXT League; 4 BNXT Supercup; 1 BeNeLux Cup
- Retired numbers: 2 (10), (20)
- Website: www.bcoostende.be
Home	Away	Third

Basketball Club Oostende is a Belgian professional basketball club. It is based in Ostend and was founded in 1970. The club competes domestically in the BNXT League. Oostende is the most successful basketball club in Belgian history, as their honour list includes a record twenty-six Belgian League championships, a record nineteen Belgian Cups and eleven Belgian Supercups.

== History ==
The club was founded on 25 May 1970 and started playing as Sunair Oostende. The team colors were blue and yellow. BCO – a nickname of the club – started in the Belgian Second Division but promoted in its first season after it took the title. But in the First Division the team relegated immediately. But BCO bounced back and promoted once again and got its final spot in the First Division, as they never relegated since.

In the 1974–75 season the club made its first appearance in Europe, when it played 10 games in the Korać Cup. In 1979 the first trophy was won by Oostende: the Belgian Basketball Cup with Ron Adams as head coach. In 1981 the first national title became a fact for BC Oostende, Roger Dutremble was head coach. The club eventually won 6th straight titles in a row in Belgium. In 1988 the club won the first and only BeNeLux Cup.

Before the 1999–2000 season the club got its first name change, as the name of the club became Telindus Oostende, which referred to the new main sponsor. After the club won some more trophies to add to its honour list, the club got a new arena in the Sea'rena – that was named the Sleuyter Arena after one season and had a capacity of 5,000 people – in 2005.

=== Fourteen consecutive championships (2011–2025) ===
The original BCO logo, used during the 2017–18 season

Before the start of the 2010–11 season the club name was changed in Telenet (BC) Oostende. In the second Telenet season Jean-Marc Jaumin was fired by the club and the Croatian coach Dario Gjergja took over his tasks. After that the club won the national title, by beating Spirou Charleroi 3–2 in the Finals, Game 5 ended in 75–74 after overtime.

The logo of the team when it was known as Telenet Oostende

The championship in 2011 was the start of a nice streak for Gjergja, as BCO won the double in 2012–13. Star player of the team was Matt Lojeski, who was named League MVP.

In 2013–14, the club won the double once again, as BCO beat Okapi Aalstar 3–2 in the Finals. Oostende earlier beat Antwerp Giants in the Cup Final. The Serbian point guard Dušan Đorđević shined for Oostende, as he was the Belgian Cup MVP and the league MVP.

On September 23 (2014), the club retired Veselin Petrović's number 10.

In 2017, the club won its sixth-consecutive championship. After the 2016–17 season, main sponsor Telenet left the club in order to sponsor Antwerp Giants instead.

In 2018, the club set a new record by winning its seventh consecutive championship. In the 2018–19 season, the team was named Filou Oostende after a sponsorship agreement with beer brand Filou, brewed by Van Honsebrouck Brewery.

In 2019 Ostend became champions again, for the eighth time in a row. They beat Antwerp in the finals.

In 2020 Ostend was declared champions when the 2019–20 season was cancelled due to the COVID-19 pandemic. They were leading the standings at that time. On July 2, 2020, head coach Dario Gjergja extended his contract for five more year. On July 7, team captain Đorđević extended his contract for two more years until 2022.

On 9 June 2021, Ostend secured their 10th consecutive domestic title. By beating Mons-Hainaut in the final series (3-1) Ostend brought home the 7th double in 10 years, as they beat Mechelen in the cupfinal earlier in the season.

Since the 2021–22 season, Oostende plays in the BNXT League, in which the national leagues of Belgium and the Netherlands have been merged.

On May 8, 2024 the club retired Dusan Djordjevic's shirt number 20. He won 12 consecutive national championships with the team.

== Sponsorship names ==
For sponsorship reasons, the name of the club has been frequently changed.

- Sunair Oostende: (1970–1999)
- Orange Oostende: (1999–2000)
- Telindus Oostende: (2000–2008)
- Base Oostende: (2008–2010)
- Telenet Oostende: (2010–2017)
- Filou Oostende: (2018–2026)
- Coretec Oostende: (2026–present)

== Honours ==
=== Domestic competitions ===
- Belgian League

Champions (26): 1980–81, 1981–82, 1982–83, 1983–84, 1984–85, 1985–86, 1987–88, 1994–95, 2000–01, 2001–02, 2005–06, 2006–07, 2011–12, 2012–13, 2013–14, 2014–15, 2015–16, 2016–17, 2017–18, 2018-19, 2019–20 (Note: The 2019–20 Pro Basketball League season was ended on 13 March 2020 because of the COVID-19 pandemic. As such, Oostende were named champions based on standings at that time.), 2020–21, 2021–22, 2022–23, 2023–24, 2024–25

- Belgian Cup

Winners (21): 1961–62, 1978–79, 1980–81, 1981–82, 1982–83, 1984–85, 1988–89, 1990–91, 1996–97, 1997–98, 2000–01, 2007–08, 2009–10, 2012–13, 2013–14, 2014–15, 2015–16, 2016–17, 2017–18, 2020–21, 2024–25

- Belgian Supercup

Winners (12): 1981, 1982, 1988, 1989, 1998, 2000, 2006, 2014, 2015, 2017, 2018, 2021

- Second division :

Winners (3): 1958–59, 1970-71, 1972-73

=== Regional competitions ===
- BNXT League
  - Winners (1): 2023–24
  - Runners-up (2): 2021-2022, 2022–23
- BNXT Supercup

Winners (4): 2021, 2022, 2023, 2025

- BeNeLux Cup

Winners (1): 1987–88

=== European competitions ===
- EuroChallenge

Third place (1): 2010–11

== Players ==
=== Current roster ===
Note: Flags indicate national team eligibility at FIBA-sanctioned events. Players may hold other non-FIBA nationalities not displayed.

Coretec Oostende roster
Players
Coaches

Pos.	No.	Nat.	Name	Ht.	Age
G	1	(United States)	Leffew, Dakota	1.96 m (6 ft 5 in)	25 – 6 July 2001
PG	3	(Belgium)	Swenson, Stephan	1.88 m (6 ft 2 in)	24 – 30 June 2002
G/F	4	(Belgium)	Buysse, Simon	1.98 m (6 ft 6 in)	29 – 25 August 1997
F	7	(Belgium)	Pieters, Daan	1.96 m (6 ft 5 in)	19 – 9 June 2007
F	8	(Belgium)	Mennes, Joppe	1.97 m (6 ft 6 in)	23 – 20 May 2003
F	15	(Bulgaria)	Kostadinov, Konstantin	2.05 m (6 ft 9 in)	23 – 25 March 2003
PF	17	(Belgium)	Sylla, Moussa	2.00 m (6 ft 7 in)	26 – 11 May 2000
F/C	23	(United States)	Clayton, A.J.	2.03 m (6 ft 8 in)	22 – 12 February 2004
PF	30	(Belgium)	Gillet, Pierre-Antoine (C)	2.01 m (6 ft 7 in)	35 – 16 April 1991
G	44	(United States)	Miller, Adam	1.93 m (6 ft 4 in)	24 – 23 January 2002
SG		(Slovakia)	Ihring, Mario	1.93 m (6 ft 4 in)	28 – 13 June 1998

Head coach

- (Germany) Denis Wucherer

Assistant coach(es)

- (Belgium) Thierry Declercq
- (Belgium) Wen Mukubu

Legend

- (C) Team captain
- (FA) Free agent
- Injured

- Roster
Updated: November 22, 2026

=== Retired numbers ===
BC Oostende retired numbers
No	Nat.	Player	Position	Tenure	Ref.
10	(Serbia)	Veselin Petrović	SF	2005–2014	
20	(Serbia)	Dušan Đorđević	G	2011–2023	

== Season by season ==
Season	Tier	League	Pos.	Belgian Cup	European competitions	
2000–01	1	BLB	1st	Champion	1 SuproLeague	EF
2001–02	1	BLB	1st		1 Euroleague	RS
2002–03	1	BLB	3rd		2 ULEB Cup	RS
2003–04	1	BLB	4th	Runner–up	3 Europe League	EF
2004–05	1	BLB	4th		2 ULEB Cup	RS
2005–06	1	BLB	1st			
2006–07	1	BLB	1st		2 ULEB Cup	RS
2007–08	1	BLB	5th	Champion	2 ULEB Cup	RS
2008–09	1	BLB	7th		3 EuroChallenge	RS
2009–10	1	BLB	3rd	Champion		
2010–11	1	BLB	4th	Runner-up	3 EuroChallenge	3rd
2011–12	1	BLB	1st		2 Eurocup	RS
2012–13	1	BLB	1st	Champion	2 Eurocup	RS
2013–14	1	BLB	1st	Champion	2 Eurocup	L32
2014–15	1	BLB	1st	Champion	2 Eurocup	L32
2015–16	1	BLB	1st	Champion	3 Europe Cup	R16
2016–17	1	BLB	1st	Champion	3 Champions League	RS
2016–17	1	BLB	1st	Champion	4 Europe Cup	SF
2017–18	1	BLB	1st	Champion	3 Champions League	RS
2017–18	1	BLB	1st	Champion	4 Europe Cup	R16
2018–19	1	BLB	1st	Runner-up	3 Champions League	RS
2018–19	1	BLB	1st	Runner-up	4 Europe Cup	QF
2019–20	1	BLB	1st	Semifinalist	3 Champions League	R16
2020–21	1	BLB	1st	Champion	3 Champions League	RS
2021–22	1	BNXT	1st	Runner-up	3 Champions League	R16
2021–22	1	BNXT	BNXT 2nd	Runner-up	3 Champions League	R16
2022–23	1	BNXT	1st	Runner-up	3 Champions League	PI
2022–23	1	BNXT	BNXT 2nd	Runner-up	3 Champions League	PI
2023–24	1	BNXT	BE 1st	Quarterfinalist	3 Champions League	PI
2023–24	1	BNXT	BNXT 1st	Quarterfinalist	3 Champions League	PI
2024–25	1	BNXT	BE 1st	Champion	3 Champions League	PI
2024–25	1	BNXT	BNXT 3rd	Champion	3 Champions League	PI
2025–26	1	BNXT	BE 2nd	Quarterfinalist	3 Champions League	RS
2025–26	1	BNXT	BNXT 2nd	Quarterfinalist	3 Champions League	RS

== Notable players ==
Note: Flags indicate national team eligibility at FIBA-sanctioned events. Players may hold other non-FIBA nationalities not displayed.

Criteria

To appear in this section a player must have either:

- Set a club record or won an individual award while at the club
- Played at least one official international match for their national team at any time
- Played at least one official NBA match at any time.

- (Belgium) Ronny Bayer
- (Belgium) Jean-Marc Jaumin
- (Belgium) Sam Van Rossom
- (Belgium) Tomas Van Den Spiegel
- (Belgium) Matt Lojeski
- (Belgium) Rik Samaey
- (Belgium) Pierre-Antoine Gillet
- (Belgium) Noah Meeusen
- (Bosnia and Herzegovina) Elvir Ovčina
- (Bosnia and Herzegovina) Mirza Teletović
- (Colombia) Braian Angola
- (Croatia) Teo Čizmić
- (Estonia) Gert Kullamäe
- (Finland) Andre Gustavson
- (Finland) Mikael Jantunen
- (Germany) Denis Wucherer
- (Israel) (Denmark) Noam Yaacov
- (Lithuania) Andrius Giedraitis
- (Lithuania) Rimantas Kaukėnas
- (Lithuania) Marijonas Petravičius
- (Lithuania) Virginijus Praškevičius
- (Russia) Jon Robert Holden
- (Serbia) Dusan Djordjevic
- (Serbia) Dušan Kecman
- (Serbia) Ivan Paunić
- (Serbia) Veselin Petrović
- (United States) Timmy Allen
- (United States) Toby Bailey
- (United States) Jimmy Baxter
- (United States) Ralph Biggs
- (United States) Dwight Buycks
- (United States) Ed Cota
- (United States) Nick Fazekas
- (United States) Jason Gardner
- (United States) Eddie Gill
- (United States) Henry James
- (United States) Damien Jefferson
- (United States) Tre Kelley
- (United States) Barry Mitchell
- (United States) Carl Nicks
- (United States) Lavor Postell
- (United States) Ed Rains
- (United States) Quinton Ross
- (United States) Kennedy Winston
- (United States) Bracey Wright
- (United States) Rashad Wright
- (United States) Vincent Yarbrough
