= 2015–16 LPB season =

Liga Portuguesa de Basquetebol
- Season: 2015–16
- Games played: 160 (Regular phase); 27 (Playoffs)
- Teams: 11
- TV partners: A Bola TV, Benfica TV, Porto Canal

Regular season
- Season MVP: (Serbia) Sasa Borovnjak
- Relegated: Maia Basket

Finals
- Champions: Porto; 12th title
- Runners-up: Benfica
- Semi-finalists: Ovarense Dolce Vita; Oliveirense

Statistical leaders
Points	(Serbia) Sasa Borovnjak	19.6
Rebounds	(Serbia) Sasa Borovnjak	9.2
Assists	(Portugal) Tomás Barroso	4.4

The 2015–16 LPB season was the 83rd season of the premier Portuguese basketball league, and the eighth season under the current Liga Portuguesa de Basquetebol (LPB) format. The regular season was played between 10 October 2015 and 17 April May 2016, and was followed by the playoffs between 22 April and 28 May 2016.

Porto defeated four-time defending champions Benfica 3–1 in the playoff finals to win their 12th national championship title, in the first season after being promoted from the second tier.

== Format ==
A total of eleven teams played a first phase in a double round-robin format, with the odd team resting every matchday. In the second phase, contested in the same system, teams were divided into two groups according to their classification in the previous round: Group A comprised the six best-ranked teams and Group B included the remaining teams. The six teams from Group A and the two best-placed teams from Group B qualified for the playoffs, while the last-placed team from Group B was relegated to the Proliga.

== Teams ==
Location of teams in 2015–16 LPB season (Mainland)
Location of teams in 2015–16 LPB season (Madeira)
Location of teams in 2015–16 LPB season (Azores)

Due to the withdrawal of Algés, a total of 11 teams will participate in the 2015–16 LPB. The Portuguese Basketball Federation invited each of the teams relegated in the previous season, Illiabum and Sampaense, to take the place left vacant by Algés, but neither accepted. In this way, the top nine teams (excluding Algés) from the 2014–15 LPB will be joined by the top two teams from the 2014–15 Proliga: Porto, who return to the top-tier league after the 2011–12 season, and Eléctrico.

Team	City	Venue
Barcelos	Barcelos	Pavilhão da Escola Secundária de Barcelos
Benfica	Lisbon	Pavilhão Fidelidade
CAB Madeira	Funchal, Madeira	Pavilhão do CAB
Eléctrico	Ponte de Sôr	Pavilhão Municipal de Ponte de Sôr
Galitos Barreiro	Barreiro	Pavilhão Municipal Luís Carvalho
Lusitânia	Angra do Heroísmo, Azores	Pavilhão Municipal de Angra do Heroísmo
Maia Basket	Maia	Pavilhão Municipal de Formigueiro
Oliveirense	Oliveira de Azeméis	Pavilhão Dr. Salvador Machado
Ovarense Dolce Vita	Ovar	Arena Dolce Vita
Porto	Porto	Dragão Caixa
Vitória de Guimarães	Guimarães	Pavilhão do Vitória S.C.

== Regular season ==
=== First phase ===
Pos	Team	Pld	W	L	PF	PA	PD	Pts	Qualification
1	Benfica	20	19	1	1607	1296	+311	39	Second phase (Group A)
2	Porto	20	17	3	1516	1283	+233	37	Second phase (Group A)
3	Ovarense Dolce Vita	20	12	8	1541	1441	+100	32	Second phase (Group A)
4	Oliveirense	20	11	9	1435	1404	+31	31	Second phase (Group A)
5	Barcelos	20	11	9	1369	1343	+26	31	Second phase (Group A)
6	Galitos Barreiro	20	11	9	1461	1404	+57	31	Second phase (Group A)
7	Lusitânia	20	9	11	1458	1526	−68	29	Second phase (Group B)
8	Vitória de Guimarães	20	8	12	1482	1474	+8	28	Second phase (Group B)
9	CAB Madeira	20	5	15	1400	1554	−154	25	Second phase (Group B)
10	Eléctrico	20	4	16	1380	1631	−251	24	Second phase (Group B)
11	Maia Basket	20	3	17	1282	1575	−293	23	Second phase (Group B)

Source: FPB

=== Second phase ===
In the second phase, teams started their group matches with the results from the matches played against the remaining teams in the same group, during the first phase.

==== Group A ====
Pos	Team	Pld	W	L	PF	PA	PD	Pts	Qualification	SLB	POR	OVA	OLI	GAL	BAR
1	Benfica	20	15	5	1632	1442	+190	35	Playoffs	—	70–80	96–92	95–70	75–63	85–69
2	Porto	20	14	6	1478	1356	+122	34	Playoffs	97–94	—	87–74	80–69	73–77	64–58
3	Ovarense Dolce Vita	20	10	10	1507	1479	+28	30	Playoffs	82–77	69–64	—	62–70	92–86	76–64
4	Oliveirense	20	9	11	1423	1467	−44	29	Playoffs	84–77	65–82	65–74	—	75–69	82–58
5	Galitos Barreiro	20	8	12	1408	1466	−58	28	Playoffs	77–94	62–60	74–61	83–82	—	66–50
6	Barcelos	20	4	16	1267	1505	−238	24	Playoffs	70–88	57–93	65–87	85–81	60–63	—

Source: FPB

==== Group B ====
Pos	Team	Pld	W	L	PF	PA	PD	Pts	Qualification or relegation	VIT	LUS	MAD	ELE	MAI
1	Vitória de Guimarães	16	13	3	1328	1200	+128	29	Qualification to playoffs	—	89–84	92–91	86–77	77–62
2	Lusitânia	16	11	5	1289	1211	+78	27	Qualification to playoffs	82–86	—	75–73	92–85	59–58
3	CAB Madeira	16	9	7	1280	1248	+32	25		87–77	88–92	—	101–79	76–64
4	Eléctrico	16	5	11	1201	1273	−72	21		63–73	84–82	64–71	—	85–74
5	Maia Basket	16	2	14	1102	1265	−163	18	Relegation to Proliga	64–76	67–89	69–86	93–79	—

Source: FPB

== Playoffs ==
The playoffs were contested in three rounds, which included quarter-finals, semi-finals and final. Each round was played under a best-of-five format, in which the team with the highest classification in the second phase had "home advantage" (first, second and fifth matches played at home).

Quarterfinals
1	Benfica	96	92	84	X	X
8	Lusitânia	61	64	62	X	X
4	Oliveirense	78	71	77	60	82
5	Galitos Barreiro	72	68	93	77	72
2	Porto	90	88	94	X	X
7	Vitória de Guimarães	80	81	90	X	X
3	Ovarense Dolce Vita	72	62	69	66	X
6	Barcelos	68	71	65	56	X

Semifinals
1	Benfica	97	69	89	74	86
4	Oliveirense	62	71	59	76	84
2	Porto	87	83	81	X	X
3	Ovarense Dolce Vita	73	68	73	X	X

Finals
1	Benfica	72	89	89	85	X
2	Porto	78	84	98	93	X
