= 2019–20 LPB season =

86th season of the premier Portuguese basketball league

Liga Portuguesa de Basquetebol
- Season: 2019–20
- Teams: 14

Finals
- Champions: None named

The 2019–20 LPB season was the 87th season of the premier Portuguese basketball league and the 12th season under the current Liga Portuguesa de Basquetebol (LPB) format. For sponsorship reasons, the league was also known as Liga Placard.

On 29 April 2020, the FPB declared the season was void because of the COVID-19 pandemic. No champion was named and there was no relegation.

== Format ==
Fourteen teams played a double-legged regular season. The eight first teams joined the playoffs while teams 9 to 12 played for avoiding relegation. The loser of this second playoff was relegated with the two last qualified teams.

== Teams ==
Location of teams in 2019–20 LPB season (Mainland)
Location of teams in 2019–20 LPB season (Madeira)
Location of teams in 2019–20 LPB season (Azores)

Barreirense Optimize and Maia promoted from Proliga and replaced Imortal, last qualified team in the last season.

Sporting CP, refounded 24 years later, joined directly the top tier after the unanimous approval of the league clubs.

Team	City	Venue
Barreirense Optimize	Barreiro	Luís de Carvalho
Benfica	Lisbon	Pavilhão Fidelidade
CAB Madeira	Funchal	Pavilhão do CAB
Esgueira Aveiro OLI	Esgueira	Ginásio Esgueira
Galitos Barreiro	Barreiro	Luís Carvalho
Illiabum	Ílhavo	Capitão Adriano Nordeste
Lusitânia	Angra do Heroísmo	Municipal
Maia	Maia	Municipal Nortecoope
Oliveirense	Oliveira de Azeméis	Dr. Salvador Machado
Ovarense Gavex	Ovar	Arena Gavex
Porto	Porto	Dragão Caixa
Sporting CP	Lisbon	Pavilhão João Rocha
Terceira	Angra do Heroísmo	Tornás de Borba
Vitória	Guimarães	Uni Vimaranense

== Regular season ==
=== League table ===
Pos	Team	Pld	W	L	PF	PA	PD	Pts	Qualification
1	Sporting CP	22	21	1	2055	1545	+510	43	Qualification for Champions League qualifying round
2	Benfica	22	20	2	1976	1562	+414	42	
3	Porto	22	18	4	1906	1649	+257	40	
4	Oliveirense	22	14	8	1846	1663	+183	36	
5	Vitória	22	14	8	1796	1726	+70	36	
6	Galitos	22	11	11	1821	1804	+17	33	
7	CAB Madeira	22	10	12	1742	1829	−87	32	
8	Esgueira Aveiro OLI	22	9	13	1743	1688	+55	31	
9	Lusitânia	22	9	13	1729	1847	−118	31	
10	Ovarense Gavex	22	9	13	1699	1796	−97	31	
11	Barreirense Optimize	22	7	15	1662	1882	−220	29	
12	Illiabum	22	6	16	1666	1758	−92	28	
13	Maia	22	6	16	1703	1916	−213	28	
14	Terceira	22	0	22	1570	2259	−689	22	

Source: FPB

=== Results ===
Home \ Away	BAR	BEN	ESG	GAL	ILL	LUS	MAD	MAI	OLI	OVA	POR	SPO	TER	VIT
Barreirense Optimize	—	49–95	61–78			87–75	105–100	107–79	80–89	91–80	77–85	45–93		72–73
Benfica	101–74	—		85–82	75–52		114–60		77–67	74–70	80–69	85–79	111–58	78–76
Esgueira Aveiro OLI	79–82	76–84	—		81–62	70–73	82–85		69–78	87–59	73–76	78–90	76–69	57–65
Galitos	86–83	83–94	78–79	—	81–78	96–70	92–72	92–87		92–73	73–93	72–81	96–94	
Illiabum	69–82	63–72	77–88	85–90	—	78–83	66–73	93–60		76–67	63–84		89–63	64–77
Lusitânia	89–58	60–103	59–91	80–90	106–79	—	86–83	87–90	80–69		75–96	82–94	96–71	79–92
CAB Madeira	87–71		88–91	82–72	66–69		—	76–68	84–82	81–76	59–85		88–78	82–94
Maia	93–70	68–99	87–84	78–88	76–72		75–79	—	73–95	69–90	57–103	85–97	114–68	
Oliveirense	89–67	75–84	88–82	85–78	78–83	92–70	97–83	74–63	—	87–69	71–81			90–63
Ovarense Gavex		81–90		74–73	91–87	76–70	91–73	79–60	49–91	—	88–84	70–93	91–57	
Porto	97–76	87–79	76–70	85–69		85–64		102–80	78–90	89–87	—	78–89	92–65	99–86
Sporting CP	97–67	81–75	86–68	91–69	102–55	91–65	76–62	89–76	94–70	108–56		—	114–57	89–83
Terceira	75–89	69–131	80–112	62–88	74–125	88–111	74–100	86–98	71–110	79–111		58–119	—	
Vitória	73–69	83–90	85–72	93–81	89–81	68–69	85–79	86–67	85–79	75–71	78–82	89–102	98–74	—

Updated to match(es) played on 8 March 2020. Source: FPB
Legend: Blue = home team win; Red = away team win.

== Portuguese clubs in European competitions ==
Team	Competition	Progress
Benfica	Champions League	Second qualifying round
Benfica	FIBA Europe Cup	Second round
