= 2021–22 LPB season =

89th season of the premier Portuguese basketball league

Liga Betclic^{1}
- Season: 2021–22
- Games played: 190
- Teams: 12

Regular season
- Relegated: Illiabum Clube; Académica EFAPEL

Finals
- Champions: SL Benfica (28th title)
- Runners-up: FC Porto
- Semifinalists: Sporting CP; UD Oliveirense
- ^{1} Sponsored league name, referring to Betclic.

The 2021–22 LPB season, also known as Liga Betclic for sponsorship reasons, was the 89th season of the premier Portuguese basketball league and the 14th season under the current Liga Portuguesa de Basquetebol (LPB) format. It started on 2 October 2021 with the regular season and ended on 11 June 2022 with the final.

Sporting CP was the defending champion which was swept by FC Porto in semifinals. SL Benfica won their 28th title earning their first title since the 2016–17 season.

== Teams ==
=== Promotion and relegation (pre-season) ===
A total of 12 teams contested the league, including 10 sides from the 2020–21 season and two promoted from the Proliga.

Teams promoted from Proliga

- CD Póvoa
- Illiabum Clube

=== Venues and locations ===
Location of teams in 2021–22 LPB
Location of teams in 2021–22 LPB (Madeira)
Location of teams in 2021–22 LPB (Azores)

| Team | Home city | Arena |
|---|---|---|
| Académica EFAPEL | Coimbra | Pavilhão do Dr. Mario Mexia, Ceira |
| CAB Madeira | Funchal | Pavilhão do CAB |
| CD Póvoa | Póvoa de Varzim | Municipal Nortecoope |
| FC Porto | Porto | Dragão Arena |
| Illiabum Clube | Ílhavo | Capitão Adriano Nordeste |
| Imortal LUZiGÁS | Albufeira | Pavilhão do Albufeira |
| Lusitânia Expert | Angra do Heroísmo | Municipal |
| Ovarense GAVEX | Ovar | Arena Gavex |
| SL Benfica | Lisbon | Pavilhão Fidelidade |
| Sporting CP | Lisbon | Pavilhão João Rocha |
| UD Oliveirense | Oliveira de Azeméis | Dr. Salvador Machado |
| Vitória SC | Guimarães | Uni Vimaranense |

== Regular season ==
=== League table ===
| Pos | Team | Pld | W | L | PF | PA | PD | Pts | Qualification |
|---|---|---|---|---|---|---|---|---|---|
| 1 | SL Benfica | 22 | 19 | 3 | 1953 | 1484 | +469 | 41 | Qualification to Group A |
| 2 | Sporting CP | 22 | 19 | 3 | 1917 | 1547 | +370 | 41 | Qualification to Group A |
| 3 | FC Porto | 22 | 19 | 3 | 1605 | 1367 | +238 | 41 | Qualification to Group A |
| 4 | UD Oliveirense | 22 | 13 | 9 | 1701 | 1620 | +81 | 35 | Qualification to Group A |
| 5 | Imortal LUZiGÁS | 22 | 11 | 11 | 1717 | 1731 | −14 | 33 | Qualification to Group B |
| 6 | CAB Madeira | 22 | 11 | 11 | 1697 | 1763 | −66 | 33 | Qualification to Group B |
| 7 | Lusitânia Expert | 22 | 10 | 12 | 1684 | 1790 | −106 | 32 | Qualification to Group B |
| 8 | CD Póvoa | 22 | 9 | 13 | 1535 | 1675 | −140 | 31 | Qualification to Group B |
| 9 | Ovarense GAVEX | 22 | 8 | 14 | 1644 | 1749 | −105 | 30 | Qualification to Group C |
| 10 | Vitória SC | 22 | 6 | 16 | 1662 | 1887 | −225 | 28 | Qualification to Group C |
| 11 | Illiabum Clube | 22 | 5 | 17 | 1666 | 1791 | −125 | 27 | Qualification to Group C |
| 12 | Académica EFAPEL | 22 | 2 | 20 | 1614 | 1991 | −377 | 24 | Qualification to Group C |

Source: FPB

== Second phase ==
=== Group A ===
| Pos | Team | Pld | W | L | PF | PA | PD | Pts | Qualification |
|---|---|---|---|---|---|---|---|---|---|
| 1 | SL Benfica | 28 | 24 | 4 | 2424 | 1898 | +526 | 52 | Qualification to playoffs |
| 2 | FC Porto | 28 | 23 | 5 | 2054 | 1773 | +281 | 51 | Qualification to playoffs |
| 3 | Sporting CP | 28 | 21 | 7 | 2343 | 1998 | +345 | 49 | Qualification to playoffs |
| 4 | UD Oliveirense | 28 | 14 | 14 | 2099 | 2093 | +6 | 42 | Qualification to playoffs |

Source: FPB

=== Group B ===
| Pos | Team | Pld | W | L | PF | PA | PD | Pts | Qualification |
|---|---|---|---|---|---|---|---|---|---|
| 5 | CAB Madeira | 28 | 17 | 11 | 2269 | 2238 | +31 | 45 | Qualification to playoffs |
| 6 | Lusitânia Expert | 28 | 12 | 16 | 2166 | 2309 | −143 | 40 | Qualification to playoffs |
| 7 | Imortal LUZiGÁS | 28 | 12 | 16 | 2166 | 2220 | −54 | 40 | Qualification to playoffs |
| 8 | CD Póvoa | 28 | 12 | 16 | 2009 | 2169 | −160 | 40 | Qualification to playoffs |

Source: FPB

=== Group C ===
| Pos | Team | Pld | W | L | PF | PA | PD | Pts | Qualification or relegation |
|---|---|---|---|---|---|---|---|---|---|
| 9 | Ovarense GAVEX | 28 | 13 | 15 | 2182 | 2210 | −28 | 41 | |
| 10 | Vitória SC | 28 | 10 | 18 | 2205 | 2412 | −207 | 38 | Qualification to playout |
| 11 | Illiabum Clube | 28 | 8 | 20 | 2143 | 2277 | −134 | 36 | Qualification to playout |
| 12 | Académica EFAPEL | 28 | 2 | 26 | 2060 | 2523 | −463 | 30 | Relegation to Proliga |

Source: FPB

== Playoffs ==
Quarter-finals
1 | SL Benfica | 77 | 84 | 2
8 | CD Póvoa | 59 | 67 | 0
4 | UD Oliveirense | 82 | 72 | 77 | 2
5 | CAB Madeira | 72 | 82 | 71 | 1
2 | FC Porto | 87 | 83 | 2
7 | Imortal LUZiGÁS | 46 | 63 | 0
3 | Sporting CP | 82 | 90 | 2
6 | Lusitânia Expert | 66 | 78 | 0

Semi-finals
1 | SL Benfica | 89 | 93 | 75 | 3
4 | UD Oliveirense | 72 | 80 | 60 | 0
2 | FC Porto | 87 | 74 | 95 | 3
3 | Sporting CP | 68 | 71 | 80 | 0

Final
1 | SL Benfica | 79 | 56 | 47 | 91 | 3
2 | FC Porto | 58 | 48 | 65 | 63 | 1

Source: FPB

== Playout ==
| Team 1 | Series | Team 2 | Game 1 | Game 2 | Game 3 | Game 4 | Game 5 |
|---|---|---|---|---|---|---|---|
| Vitória SC | 3–0 | Illiabum Clube | 97–88 | 95–86 | 89–74 | | |

Source: FPB

== Final standings ==
| Pos | Team | Pld | W | L | Qualification or relegation |
|---|---|---|---|---|---|
| 1 | SL Benfica (C) | 37 | 32 | 5 | Qualification to Champions League qualifying rounds |
| 2 | FC Porto | 37 | 29 | 8 | Qualification to FIBA Europe Cup regular season |
| 3 | Sporting CP | 33 | 23 | 10 | Qualification to FIBA Europe Cup qualifying rounds |
| 4 | UD Oliveirense | 34 | 16 | 18 | |
| 5 | CAB Madeira | 31 | 18 | 13 | |
| 6 | Lusitânia Expert | 30 | 12 | 18 | |
| 7 | Imortal LUZiGÁS | 30 | 12 | 18 | |
| 8 | CD Póvoa | 30 | 12 | 18 | |
| 9 | Ovarense GAVEX | 28 | 13 | 15 | |
| 10 | Vitória SC | 31 | 13 | 18 | |
| 11 | Illiabum Clube (R) | 31 | 8 | 23 | Relegation to Proliga |
| 12 | Académica EFAPEL (R) | 28 | 2 | 26 | Relegation to Proliga |

Source: FPB
(C) Champions; (R) Relegated

== Portuguese clubs in European competitions ==
| Team | Competition | Progress | Result | W–L |
|---|---|---|---|---|
| Sporting CP | Champions League | Qualifying round quarter-finals | Loss vs. (Estonia) Kalev/Cramo (69–86) | 0–1 |
| Sporting CP | FIBA Europe Cup | Quarter-finals | Loss vs. (Turkey) Bahçeşehir Koleji (124–139) | 8–6 |
| Sporting CP | FIBA Europe Cup | Second round Group K | 2nd of 4 teams (4–2) | 8–6 |
| Sporting CP | FIBA Europe Cup | Regular season Group F | 1st of 4 teams (4–2) | 8–6 |
| SL Benfica | FIBA Europe Cup | Second round Group K | 3rd of 4 teams (2–4) | 9–5 |
| SL Benfica | FIBA Europe Cup | Regular season Group C | 1st of 4 teams (5–1) | 9–5 |
| SL Benfica | FIBA Europe Cup | Qualifying round final | Win vs. (Netherlands) Donar (81–73) | 9–5 |
| SL Benfica | FIBA Europe Cup | Qualifying round semi-finals | Win vs. (Romania) Voluntari (83–77) | 9–5 |
| FC Porto | FIBA Europe Cup | Regular season Group H | 3rd of 4 teams (2–4) | 4–4 |
| FC Porto | FIBA Europe Cup | Qualifying round final | Win vs. (Israel) Ironi Ness Ziona (79–70) | 4–4 |
| FC Porto | FIBA Europe Cup | Qualifying round semi-finals | Win vs. (Cyprus) Keravnos (70–58) | 4–4 |
