= 2018–19 LPB season =

86th season of the premier Portuguese basketball league

Liga Portuguesa de Basquetebol
- Season: 2018–19
- Duration: 6 October 2018 – May 2019
- Teams: 12

Regular season
- Relegated: Imortal

Finals
- Champions: Oliveirense; 2nd title
- Runners-up: Benfica

The 2019–20 LPB season was the 86th season of the premier Portuguese basketball league and the 11th season under the current Liga Portuguesa de Basquetebol (LPB) format. For sponsorship reasons, the league was also known as Liga Placard.

Oliveirense retained the title achieving their second league ever.

== Format ==
The competition format consisted of two stages: a regular season, comprising two phases, and the play-offs. In the first phase of the regular season, the twelve participating teams compete against each other in a double round-robin system, with home and away matches.

The second phase of the regular season comprised two groups; the six best-ranked teams at the end of the first phase competed in Group A, and the remaining six teams competed in Group B. Again, teams in each group competed against each other in a double round-robin system, with home and away matches. The six Group A teams and the two best-ranked Group B teams qualified for the play-offs, while the two worst-ranked teams in Group B were relegated to the second-tier Proliga.

The play-offs were disputed as a single-elimination tournament, with fixtures determined by each team's classification in the previous round, and comprise three knockout rounds (quarter-finals, semi-finals and finals) played in a best-of-five system.

== Teams ==
Location of teams in 2018–19 LPB season (Mainland)
Location of teams in 2018–19 LPB season (Madeira)
Location of teams in 2018–19 LPB season (Azores)

Team	City	Venue
Benfica	Lisbon	Pavilhão Fidelidade
CAB Madeira	Funchal	Pavilhão do CAB
Esgueira Aveiro OLI	Esgueira	
Galitos Barreiro	Barreiro	Luís Carvalho
Illiabum	Ílhavo	Capitão Adriano Nordeste
Imortal AlgarExperienc	Albufeira	
Lusitânia	Angra do Heroísmo	Municipal
Oliveirense	Oliveira de Azeméis	Dr. Salvador Machado
Ovarense Gavex	Ovar	Arena Gavex
Porto	Porto	Dragão Caixa
Terceira	Angra do Heroísmo	
Vitória	Guimarães	Pavilhão do Vitória S.C.

== First phase ==
=== League table ===
Pos	Team	Pld	W	L	PF	PA	PD	Pts	Qualification
1	Oliveirense	22	21	1	1941	1579	+362	43	Qualification to Group A
2	Benfica	22	20	2	1961	1658	+303	42	Qualification to Group A
3	Porto	22	16	6	1964	1768	+196	38	Qualification to Group A
4	Ovarense Gavex	22	12	10	1731	1693	+38	34	Qualification to Group A
5	Lusitânia	22	11	11	1783	1821	−38	33	Qualification to Group A
6	Terceira	22	10	12	1735	1822	−87	32	Qualification to Group A
7	CAB Madeira	22	9	13	1717	1781	−64	31	Qualification to Group B
8	Esgueira Aveiro OLI	22	8	14	1725	1864	−139	30	Qualification to Group B
9	Vitória	22	8	14	1746	1844	−98	30	Qualification to Group B
10	Illiabum	22	8	14	1737	1826	−89	30	Qualification to Group B
11	Galitos	22	6	16	1716	1875	−159	28	Qualification to Group B
12	Imortal AlgarExperienc	22	3	19	1674	1899	−225	25	Qualification to Group B

Source: FPB

=== Results ===
Home \ Away	SLB	MAD	ESG	GAL	ILL	IMO	LUS	OLI	OVA	POR	TER	VIT
Benfica	—	105–91	112–66	111–70	98–75	88–80	89–69	83–75	101–78	93–88	82–65	83–81
CAB Madeira	69–89	—	76–72	71–77	72–69	88–58	86–92	79–89	82–77	70–95	86–91	80–58
Esgueira Aveiro OLI	69–89	66–77	—	84–74	79–64	87–84	77–85	74–86	75–86	82–93	89–81	85–77
Galitos	77–81	71–88	83–69	—	83–70	101–90	66–75	70–111	74–87	98–102	69–81	83–88
Illiabum	64–71	92–90	80–83	89–73	—	86–76	85–78	75–85	67–75	90–76	86–84	88–69
Imortal AlgarExperienc	87–93	66–77	58–76	76–91	85–77	—	87–81	76–95	58–83	70–84	90–99	78–71
Lusitânia	76–88	82–78	93–92	76–65	94–86	85–84	—	57–77	67–73	85–78	77–85	84–91
Oliveirense	92–82	86–56	106–83	82–60	94–66	84–68	89–87	—	80–71	93–80	77–51	89–66
Ovarense Gavex	55–70	87–78	77–85	80–69	85–92	72–67	84–78	64–80	—	76–79	103–76	82–60
Porto	96–78	93–61	98–64	97–88	97–68	94–65	90–85	82–96	104–84	—	75–86	94–86
Terceira	64–101	78–89	86–80	79–87	82–78	100–89	74–77	63–84	84–75	73–85	—	71–76
Vitória	71–74	88–72	99–88	88–87	97–90	87–82	96–100	86–91	67–77	77–84	67–82	—

Source: FPB
Legend: Blue = home team win; Red = away team win.

== Group 1–6 ==
=== League table ===
Pos	Team	Pld	W	L	PF	PA	PD	Pts	Qualification
1	Oliveirense	22	21	1	1941	1579	+362	42	Qualification to playoffs
2	Benfica	22	20	2	1961	1658	+303	40	Qualification to playoffs
3	Porto	22	16	6	1964	1768	+196	32	Qualification to playoffs
4	Ovarense Gavex	22	12	10	1731	1693	+38	24	Qualification to playoffs
5	Lusitânia	22	11	11	1783	1821	−38	22	Qualification to playoffs
6	Terceira	22	10	12	1735	1822	−87	20	Qualification to playoffs

Source: FPB

=== Results ===
Home \ Away	SLB	LUS	OLI	OVA	POR	TER
Benfica	—	113–76	71–78	90–61	79–84	112–60
Lusitânia	76–91	—	98–100	72–69	79–85	90–87
Oliveirense	79–84	98–74	—	87–62	88–68	103–75
Ovarense Gavex	80–57	82–90	68–70	—	73–80	98–76
Porto	73–76	103–70	81–79	99–73	—	105–69
Terceira	75–119	60–84	70–93	83–89	87–96	—

Source: FPB
Legend: Blue = home team win; Red = away team win.

== Group 7–12 ==
=== League table ===
Pos	Team	Pld	W	L	PF	PA	PD	Pts	Qualification or relegation
1	CAB Madeira	22	9	13	1717	1781	−64	18	Qualification to playoffs
2	Esgueira Aveiro OLI	22	8	14	1725	1864	−139	16	Qualification to playoffs
3	Vitória	22	8	14	1746	1844	−98	16	
4	Illiabum	22	8	14	1737	1826	−89	16	
5	Galitos	22	6	16	1716	1875	−159	12	
6	Imortal AlgarExperienc	22	3	19	1674	1899	−225	6	Relegation to Proliga

Source: FPB

=== Results ===
Home \ Away	MAD	ESG	GAL	ILL	IMO	VIT
CAB Madeira	—	90–72	94–90	75–80	85–66	74–79
Esgueira Aveiro OLI	62–73	—	73–76	87–66	83–81	69–66
Galitos	75–77	87–71	—	68–73	82–72	85–80
Illiabum	77–95	90–86	75–85	—	98–86	82–72
Imortal AlgarExperienc	75–80	83–77	85–92	89–82	—	79–78
Vitória	95–58	73–81	82–83	78–83	91–85	—

Source: FPB
Legend: Blue = home team win; Red = away team win.

== Playoffs ==
Seeded teams played at home games 1, 2 and 5.

=== Bracket ===
Quarter-finals
Oliveirense	3
Illiabum	0
Ovarense Gavex	3
Lusitânia	0
Benfica	3
CAB Madeira	0
Porto	3
Terceira	0

Semi-finals
Oliveirense	3
Ovarense Gavex	0
Benfica	3
Porto	0

Final
Oliveirense	3
Benfica	1

=== Quarter-finals ===
Team 1	Series	Team 2	Game 1	Game 2	Game 3	Game 4	Game 5
Oliveirense	3–0	Illiabum	90–68	88–75	92–69		
Benfica	3–0	CAB Madeira	92–63	101–59	80–59		
Porto	3–0	Terceira	92–82	91–77	85–79		
Ovarense Gavex	3–0	Lusitânia	68–63	86–69	86–77		

=== Semi-finals ===
Team 1	Series	Team 2	Game 1	Game 2	Game 3	Game 4	Game 5
Oliveirense	3–0	Ovarense Gavex	99–72	94−68	93–73		
Benfica	3–0	Porto	89−82	84–61	77–68		

=== Finals ===
Team 1	Series	Team 2	Game 1	Game 2	Game 3	Game 4	Game 5
Oliveirense	3–1	Benfica	85–75	74–81	87-82	97-72	

== Portuguese clubs in European competitions ==
Team	Competition	Progress
Porto	Champions League	First qualifying round
Porto	FIBA Europe Cup	Regular season
Benfica	FIBA Europe Cup	Second qualifying round
