= 2020–21 LPB season =

87th season of the premier Portuguese basketball league

Liga Portuguesa de Basquetebol
- Season: 2020-21
- Teams: 14

Finals
- Champions: Sporting CP (9th title)
- Runners-up: FC Porto

The 2020–21 LPB season is the 88th season of the premier Portuguese basketball league and the 13th season under the current Liga Portuguesa de Basquetebol (LPB) format. For sponsorship reasons, the league was also known as Liga Placard.

== Teams ==
Imortal and Academica Efapel are promoted to Liga Placard, replacing Illiabum and Terceira.

Location of teams in 2020–21 LPB season (Mainland)
Location of teams in 2020–21 LPB season (Madeira)
Location of teams in 2020–21 LPB season (Azores)

Team	City	Venue
Academica Efapel	Coimbra	Pavilhão do Dr. Mario Mexia, Ceira
FC Barreirense	Barreiro	Luís de Carvalho
SL Benfica	Lisbon	Pavilhão Fidelidade
CAB Madeira	Funchal	Pavilhão do CAB
Esgueira Aveiro Oli	Esgueira	Ginásio Esgueira
Galitos Barreiro	Barreiro	Luís Carvalho
Imortal Luzigas	Albufeira	Pavilhão do Albufeira
Lusitânia Expert	Angra do Heroísmo	Municipal
Maia Basket	Maia	Municipal Nortecoope
UD Oliveirense	Oliveira de Azeméis	Dr. Salvador Machado
Ovarense Gavex	Ovar	Arena Gavex
FC Porto	Porto	Dragão Caixa
Sporting CP	Lisbon	Pavilhão João Rocha
Vitória SC	Guimarães	Uni Vimaranense

== Regular season ==
=== League table ===
Pos	Team	Pld	W	L	PF	PA	PD	Pts	Qualification
1	Sporting CP	26	23	3	2309	1824	+485	49	Qualification to Playoffs
2	FC Porto	26	22	4	2158	1768	+390	48	Qualification to Playoffs
3	Imortal Luzigas	26	20	6	2203	1982	+221	46	Qualification to Playoffs
4	SL Benfica	26	19	7	2333	2004	+329	45	Qualification to Playoffs
5	UD Oliveirense	26	19	7	2205	1959	+246	45	Qualification to Playoffs
6	Lusitânia Expert	26	17	9	2161	2078	+83	43	Qualification to Playoffs
7	CAB Madeira	26	12	14	2165	2242	−77	38	Qualification to Playoffs
8	Vitória SC	26	12	14	2074	2134	−60	38	Qualification to Playoffs
9	Ovarense Gavex	26	9	17	2086	2203	−117	35	Qualification to Playout
10	Academica Efapel	26	9	17	1973	2105	−132	35	Qualification to Playout
11	Galitos Barreiro (R)	26	8	18	1933	2189	−256	34	Qualification to Playout
12	Esgueira Aveiro Oli (R)	26	7	19	1973	2127	−154	33	Qualification to Playout
13	Maia Basket (R)	26	3	23	1881	2268	−387	29	Relegation to Proliga
14	FC Barreirense (R)	26	2	24	1841	2412	−571	28	Relegation to Proliga

Updated to match(es) played on 17 April 2021. Source:
(R) Relegated

=== Results ===
Home \ Away	ACA	BAR	BEN	ESG	GAL	IMM	LUS	MAD	MAI	OLI	OVA	POR	SPO	VIT
Academica Efapel	—							77–68						
FC Barreirense		—			72–85									
SL Benfica			—	78–73							92–73			
Esgueira Aveiro Oli				—			65–80							
Galitos Barreiro					—								70–78	66–82
Imortal Luzigas	95–69					—								
Lusitânia Expert							—						65–74	
CAB Madeira						75–94		—						85–66
Maia Basket	63–80	79–77							—					
UD Oliveirense		102–54					84–90			—				
Ovarense Gavex				71–99		59–84					—			
FC Porto										97–72		—		
Sporting CP			67–63										—	
Vitória SC									88–74					—

Updated to match(es) played on 15 December 2020. Source:
Legend: Blue = home team win; Red = away team win.

== Playoffs ==
Quarterfinals
1	Sporting CP	94	85	71	97
8	Vitória SC	58	67	84	80
4	SL Benfica	95	88	82	97
5	UD Oliveirense	89	89	79	88
2	Porto	105	77	79	98
7	CAB Madeira	53	64	86	85
3	Imortal Luzigas	94	102	96
6	Lusitânia Expert	81	84	80

Semifinals
1	Sporting CP	92	83	95
4	SL Benfica	86	75	82
2	Porto	92	110	97
3	Imortal Luzigas	67	68	68

Finals
1	Sporting CP	74	69	73	80	86
2	Porto	72	81	87	76	85

== Playouts ==
Finals
9	Ovarense Gavex	75	73	103	92
12	Esgueria Aveiro Oli	82	63	92	85

Finals
10	Academica Efapel	95	87	109
11	Galitos Barreiro	88	86	100

== Portuguese clubs in European competitions ==
Team	Competition	Progress
Sporting CP	Champions League	Second qualifying round
Sporting CP	FIBA Europe Cup	Group stage
