= 2016–17 LPB season =

Liga Portuguesa de Basquetebol
- Season: 2016–17
- Teams: 12

Regular season
- Relegated: Maia Basket Escapeforte; Sampaense

Finals
- Champions: Benfica; 27th title
- Runners-up: Porto

The 2016–17 LPB season was the 84th season of the premier Portuguese basketball league, and the ninth season under the current Liga Portuguesa de Basquetebol (LPB) format. For sponsorship reasons, the league is also known as Liga Placard.

Benfica won its 27th title and recovered the title after beating defending champions Porto in the finals by 3–0.

== Format ==
The competition format consisted of two stages: a regular season, comprising two phases, and the play-offs. In the first phase of the regular season, the twelve participating teams compete against each other in a double round-robin system, with home and away matches. Match wins, draws and losses are worth two, one and zero points, respectively. The second phase of the regular season comprises two groups; the six best-ranked teams at the end of the first phase compete in Group A, and the remaining six teams compete in Group B. Again, teams in each group compete against each other in a double round-robin system, with home and away matches. The six Group A teams and the two best-ranked Group B teams qualify for the play-offs, while the two worst-ranked teams in Group B are relegated to the second-tier Proliga. The play-offs are disputed as a single-elimination tournament, with fixtures determined by each team's classification in the previous round, and comprise three knockout rounds (quarter-finals, semi-finals and finals) played in a best-of-five system.

== Teams ==
Maia Basket Escapeforte avoided relegation after the resign of Atlético Clube de Portugal to promote. Also, Sampaense promoted after Barcelos decided to dissolve its senior team.

Location of teams in 2016–17 LPB season (Mainland)
Location of teams in 2016–17 LPB season (Madeira)
Location of teams in 2016–17 LPB season (Azores)

Team	City	Venue
Benfica	Lisbon	Pavilhão Fidelidade
CAB Madeira	Funchal, Madeira	Pavilhão do CAB
Eléctrico	Ponte de Sôr	Municipal
Galitos Barreiro	Barreiro	Luís Carvalho
Illiabum	Ílhavo	Capitão Adriano Nordeste
Lusitânia	Angra do Heroísmo, Azores	Municipal
Maia Basket Escapeforte	Maia	Municipal de Formigueiro
Oliveirense	Oliveira de Azeméis	Dr. Salvador Machado
Ovarense Dolce Vita	Ovar	Arena Dolce Vita
Porto	Porto	Dragão Caixa
Sampaense	Coimbra	Comendador Serafim Marques
Vitória de Guimarães	Guimarães	Pavilhão do Vitória S.C.

== First phase ==
=== League table ===
Pos	Team	Pld	W	L	PF	PA	PD	Pts	Qualification
1	Porto	22	19	3	1889	1491	+398	41	Second phase (Group A)
2	Benfica	22	17	5	1787	1512	+275	39	Second phase (Group A)
3	Vitória de Guimarães	22	16	6	1803	1682	+121	38	Second phase (Group A)
4	Oliveirense	22	16	6	1582	1416	+166	38	Second phase (Group A)
5	Galitos Barreiro	22	14	8	1669	1590	+79	36	Second phase (Group A)
6	Illiabum	22	12	10	1710	1677	+33	34	Second phase (Group A)
7	CAB Madeira	22	11	11	1752	1684	+68	33	Second phase (Group B)
8	Ovarense Dolce Vita	22	11	11	1680	1735	−55	33	Second phase (Group B)
9	Lusitânia	22	6	16	1658	1810	−152	28	Second phase (Group B)
10	Eléctrico	22	4	18	1624	1887	−263	26	Second phase (Group B)
11	Sampaense	22	3	19	1531	1920	−389	25	Second phase (Group B)
12	Maia Basket Escapeforte	22	3	19	1605	1886	−281	25	Second phase (Group B)

Source: FPB

=== Results ===
Home \ Away	SLB	MAD	ELÉ	GAL	ILL	LUS	MAI	OLI	OVA	FCP	SAM	VIT
Benfica		75–66	104–66	69–57	93–74	100–65	89–66	74–81	87–69	69–56	99–65	85–64
CAB Madeira	72–90		86–87	73–81	70–71	96–79	93–77	0–20 (Note: Game CAB Madeira – Oliveirense finished 103–95 but a 0–20 was given to Oliveirense.)	91–76	60–71	104–71	67–89
Eléctrico	62–85	82–89		58–70	90–85	82–88	75–81	56–77	70–82	67–101	75–79	71–77
Galitos Barreiro	69–68	70–83	87–85		83–74	89–77	94–55	79–77	82–71	61–67	83–54	80–68
Illiabum	85–71	84–87	91–62	59–71		79–54	86–65	86–83	72–56	67–81	80–63	68–71
Lusitânia	82–91	74–92	62–75	84–67	78–82		89–86	68–78	73–78	68–92	88–83	70–73
Maia Basket	60–66	72–93	98–84	74–75	86–89	82–89		70–76	62–72	66–90	79–68	74–94
Oliveirense	78–75	76–70	76–63	74–62	75–67	82–62	82–73		72–54	60–69	74–53	67–64
Ovarense Dolce Vita	74–83	93–88	77–83	94–90	73–84	68–61	81–71	67–65		66–79	88–67	95–102
Porto	74–76	91–68	97–76	82–66	85–73	92–83	110–60	68–66	89–73		111–62	92–71
Sampaense	59–73	79–111	91–78	61–73	73–87	65–96	89–74	70–81	67–69	59–121		77–90
Vitória de Guimarães	68–65	76–93	104–77	83–80	107–67	77–68	102–74	66–62	97–103	74–71	86–76	

Source: LPB
Legend: Blue = home team win; Red = away team win.

== Second phase ==
In the second phase, teams started their group matches with the results from the matches played against the remaining teams in the same group, during the first phase.

=== Group A ===
Pos	Team	Pld	W	L	PF	PA	PD	Pts	Qualification	POR	SLB	OLI	VIT	GAL	ILL
1	Porto	32	26	6	2716	2194	+522	58	Qualification to playoffs	—	85–74	84–74	101–96	82–58	85–53
2	Benfica	32	24	8	2584	2268	+316	56	Qualification to playoffs	87–70	—	72–67	80–76	76–74	106–68
3	Oliveirense	32	22	10	2326	2132	+194	54	Qualification to playoffs	78–73	79–62	—	83–87	74–63	67–60
4	Vitória de Guimarães	32	21	11	2601	2463	+138	53	Qualification to playoffs	78–76	80–85	74–84	—	69–81	72–55
5	Galitos Barreiro	32	18	14	2379	2321	+58	50	Qualification to playoffs	61–83	78–79	72–64	71–80	—	80–61
6	Illiabum	32	13	19	2327	2483	−156	45	Qualification to playoffs	44–88	79–76	69–74	65–86	63–72	—

Source: LPB

=== Group B ===
Pos	Team	Pld	W	L	PF	PA	PD	Pts	Qualification or relegation	MAD	OVA	ELE	LUS	SAM	MAI
1	CAB Madeira	32	19	13	2662	2531	+131	51	Qualification to playoffs	—	76–86	92–85	97–83	87–83	98–90
2	Ovarense	32	19	13	2534	2501	+33	51	Qualification to playoffs	67–85	—	78–92	102–77	94–57	68–61
3	Eléctrico	32	11	21	2522	2744	−222	43		94–90	81–93	—	92–90	79–59	82–69
4	Lusitânia	32	8	24	2526	2745	−219	40		100–104	79–82	90–98	—	88–87	87–85
5	Sampaense (R)	32	6	26	2366	2802	−436	38	Relegation to Proliga	83–84	78–87	93–97	109–97	—	95–88
6	Maia Basket Escapeforte (R)	32	5	27	2424	2774	−350	37	Relegation to Proliga	74–97	80–97	103–96	88–77	81–91	—

Source: LPB
(R) Relegated

== Playoffs ==
Seeded teams played games 1, 2 and 5 at home.

Quarter-finals
Porto	95	92	97
Ovarense	72	63	68
Vitória de Guimarães	99	92	78	88	81
Galitos Barreiro	57	98	81	79	79
Benfica	96	73	75	86
CAB Madeira	76	74	67	72
Oliveirense	92	91	64
Illiabum	72	73	60

Semi-finals
Porto	80	83	95
Vitória de Guimarães	69	78	70
Benfica	97	90	69
Oliveirense	91	81	60

Final
Porto	70	81	53
Benfica	73	83	83

== Portuguese clubs in European competitions ==
Team	Competition	Progress
Benfica	Champions League	Second qualifying round
Benfica	FIBA Europe Cup	Second round
Porto	Champions League	Second qualifying round
Porto	FIBA Europe Cup	Regular season
