= Betinho (basketball) =

Cape Verdean professional basketball player

Free Agent
- Position: Small forward

Personal information
- Born: 5 February 1985 (age 41) Fogo, Cape Verde
- Listed height: 6 ft 7 in (2.01 m)
- Listed weight: 190 lb (86 kg)

Career information
- NBA draft: 2005: undrafted
- Playing career: 2003–present

Career history
- 2003–2007: Barreirense
- 2007–2008: Cantabria
- 2008–2011: Breogán
- 2011–2014: Benfica
- 2014–2016: Andorra
- 2016–2019: Aquila Basket Trento
- 2019–2026: Benfica

Career highlights
- 6× Portuguese League champion (2012–2014, 2022–2025); 2× Portuguese Cup winner (2014, 2023); 3× Portuguese Cup winner (2013, 2014, 2024); 3× Portuguese Super Cup winner (2012, 2013, 2023); 2× António Pratas Trophy winner (2012, 2013)

João Gomes (born 2 May 1985), commonly known as Betinho, is a Cape Verdean professional basketball player who last played for Benfica in the Portuguese Basketball League.

== Club career ==
Born in Fogo, Cape Verde, Betinho started playing basketball at Portuguese club FC Barreirense, where he developed his skills, and was then noticed by American and European scouts. His performance with Barreirense led to an invitation to play in the 2006 and 2007 Reebok EuroCamp editions in Treviso. He was eligible for the 2007 NBA draft. After working out for several NBA teams such as the Boston Celtics, Portland Trail Blazers, and Detroit Pistons, he went undrafted.

On 22 August 2011, Betinho was confirmed as a new signing for Benfica in Portugal. He left the club in 2014 and returned in July 2019.

== International career ==
Betinho was a member of the Portugal national team in the EuroBasket 2007 and the FIBA EuroBasket 2009 qualification.

== Honours ==
Benfica

- Portuguese League: 2011–12, 2012–13, 2013–14, 2021–22, 2022–23, 2023–24, 2024–25
- Portuguese Cup: 2013–14, 2022–23
- Portuguese League Cup: 2012–13, 2013–14, 2023–24
- Portuguese Super Cup: 2012, 2013, 2023
- António Pratas Trophy: 2011–12, 2012–13
