= 2024–25 LPB season =

92nd season of the premier Portuguese basketball league

Liga Betclic^{1}
- Season: 2024–25
- Games played: 151
- Teams: 12

Regular season
- Top seed: SL Benfica
- Relegated: CD Póvoa ESC ONLINE; AD Galomar

Finals
- Champions: SL Benfica (31st title)
- Runners-up: FC Porto
- Semifinalists: Sporting CP; Ovarense GAVEX
- ^{1} Sponsored league name, referring to Betclic.

The 2024–25 LPB season, also known as Liga Betclic for sponsorship reasons, was the 92nd season of the premier Portuguese basketball league and the 17th season under the current Liga Portuguesa de Basquetebol (LPB) format. It started on 19 October 2024 with the regular season and ended on 15 June 2025 with the final.

SL Benfica defended successfully the crown to won their fourth consecutive Portuguese title (31st overall) against FC Porto.

== Teams ==
=== Promotion and relegation (pre-season) ===
A total of 12 teams contested the league, including 10 sides from the 2023–24 season and two promoted from the Proliga.

▲ Promoted from Proliga	▼ Relegated to Proliga
Queluz O NOSSO PREGO; Galitos BARREIRO	Portimonense SC; SC Lusitânia

=== Venues and locations ===
Location of teams in 2024–25 LPB
Location of teams in 2024–25 LPB (Madeira)

Team	Home city	Arena
AD Galomar	Caniço	Pavilhão do Caniço
CD Póvoa ESC ONLINE	Póvoa de Varzim	Pavilhão do Clube Desportivo Póvoa
Esgueira Aveiro OLI	Esgueira	Pavilhão Clube do Povo de Esgueira
FC Porto	Porto	Dragão Arena
Galitos BARREIRO	Barreiro	Pavilhão Municipal Prof Luís de Carvalho
Imortal LUZiGÁS	Albufeira	Pavilhão Desportivo de Albufeira
Ovarense GAVEX	Ovar	Arena de Ovar
Queluz O NOSSO PREGO	Queluz	Pavilhão Henrique Miranda
SL Benfica	Lisbon	Pavilhão Fidelidade
Sporting CP	Lisbon	Pavilhão João Rocha
UD Oliveirense	Oliveira de Azeméis	Pavilhão Dr. Salvador Machado
Vitória SC	Guimarães	Pavilhão Desportivo Unidade Vimaranense

== Regular season ==
=== League table ===
Pos	Team	Pld	W	L	PF	PA	PD	Pts	Qualification or relegation
1	SL Benfica	22	21	1	2002	1687	+315	43	Qualification to play-offs
2	FC Porto	22	19	3	1946	1719	+227	41	Qualification to play-offs
3	Sporting CP	22	15	7	1892	1728	+164	37	Qualification to play-offs
4	UD Oliveirense	22	13	9	1855	1741	+114	35	Qualification to play-offs
5	Ovarense GAVEX	22	13	9	1745	1767	−22	35	Qualification to play-offs
6	Galitos BARREIRO	22	10	12	1760	1784	−24	32	Qualification to play-offs
7	Imortal LUZiGÁS	22	10	12	1751	1872	−121	32	Qualification to play-offs
8	Vitória SC	22	9	13	1807	1847	−40	31	Qualification to play-offs
9	Esgueira Aveiro OLI	22	9	13	1803	1905	−102	31	
10	Queluz O NOSSO PREGO	22	5	17	1784	1974	−190	27	
11	CD Póvoa ESC ONLINE	22	5	17	1613	1781	−168	27	Relegation to Proliga
12	AD Galomar	22	3	19	1669	1822	−153	25	Relegation to Proliga

Source: FPB

== Play-offs ==
Quarter-finals
1	SL Benfica	99	88	2
8	Vitória SC	87	68	0
4	UD Oliveirense	87	77	82	1
5	Ovarense GAVEX	74	92	83	2
2	FC Porto	88	95	2
7	Imortal LUZiGÁS	74	84	0
3	Sporting CP	90	88	2
6	Galitos BARREIRO	79	83	0

Semi-finals
1	SL Benfica	85	103	89	3
5	Ovarense GAVEX	66	71	80	0
2	FC Porto	91	83	78	3
3	Sporting CP	81	64	74	0

Final
1	SL Benfica	95	89	75	93	3
2	FC Porto	94	81	82	71	1

Source: FPB

== Final standings ==
Pos	Team	Pld	W	L	Qualification or relegation
1	SL Benfica (C)	31	29	2	Qualification to Champions League regular season
2	FC Porto	31	25	6	Qualification to Champions League qualifying rounds
3	Sporting CP	27	17	10	Qualification to FIBA Europe Cup regular season
4	Ovarense GAVEX	28	15	13	
5	UD Oliveirense	25	14	11	
6	Galitos BARREIRO	24	10	14	
7	Imortal LUZiGÁS	24	10	14	
8	Vitória SC	24	9	15	
9	Esgueira Aveiro OLI	22	9	13	
10	Queluz O NOSSO PREGO	22	5	17	
11	CD Póvoa ESC ONLINE (R)	22	5	17	Relegation to Proliga
12	AD Galomar (R)	22	3	19	Relegation to Proliga

Source: FPB
(C) Champions; (R) Relegated

== Portuguese clubs in European competitions ==
Team	Competition	Progress	Result	W–L
SL Benfica	Champions League	Regular season Group G	4th of 4 teams (1–5)	3–5
SL Benfica	Champions League	Qualifying round final	Win vs. (Switzerland) Fribourg Olympic (91–85)	3–5
SL Benfica	Champions League	Qualifying round semi-finals	Win vs. (Bulgaria) Rilski Sportist (89–88)	3–5
FC Porto	FIBA Europe Cup	Second round Group K	3rd of 4 teams (3–3)	8–4
FC Porto	FIBA Europe Cup	Regular season Group I	1st of 4 teams (5–1)	8–4
Sporting CP	FIBA Europe Cup	Regular season Group D	3rd of 4 teams (1–5)	2–5–1
Sporting CP	FIBA Europe Cup	Qualifying round	Win vs. (Belgium) Spirou (148–141)	2–5–1
