= António Pratas Trophy =

Troféu António Pratas
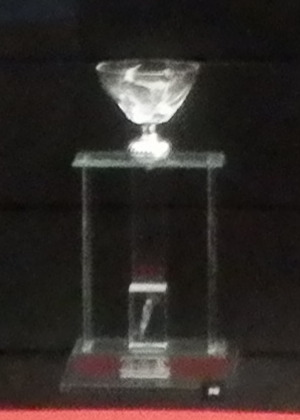
- The trophy at Museu Cosme Damião
- Sport: Basketball
- First season: 2007
- No. of teams: 5 and 16
- Country: Portugal
- Continent: (European Union) Europe
- Most recent champions: LPB: Benfica (5h title); Proliga: Portimonense (1st title)
- Most titles: LPB: Benfica (5 titles); Proliga: Illiabum (3 titles)
- Related competitions: LPB; Proliga

The Troféu António Pratas (English: António Pratas Trophy) is an annual cup competition for Portuguese basketball teams organized by the Portuguese Basketball Federation. Created in 2007 to honour António Pratas, its first edition was open only to Proliga clubs. A year later, it expanded to include teams from the Liga Portuguesa de Basquetebol and has since established itself as a season "curtain-raiser".

Played in early October in two levels, Proliga and LPB, each winner receives a trophy for their respective competition. After the inaugural season, won by Benfica, the second edition crowned six winners across three different regions. The third year featured a one-off combined edition, where both leagues completed together. Since 2010, the competition has followed its current format: a qualification stage followed by a Final Four, which determines the winner. Benfica has won five titles wins at the LPB level, while Illiabum has claimed three at the Proliga level.

== History ==
The Troféu António Pratas is a tournament created in September 2007 to honour the recently deceased António Pratas, a Portuguese basketball player who competed in the 1970s. The first edition was exclusivity for Proliga clubs and was played at the Pavilhão Henrique Miranda in Queluz. From the original fourteen teams, only Benfica and Física Torres Novas resisted through the three knock-out stages. The final played on 7 October 2007, was won by Benfica for 76–58 with Miguel Minhava scoring 17 points and being named man of the match. The trophy returned in 2008 and was expanded to include the teams from the Liga Portuguesa de Basquetebol, or LPB. In this new format, the tournament was split between three regions: north; centre; and south, and with Proliga and LPB teams playing in two different levels. Lasting from 26 to 28 September, the tournament produced six winners: in the LPB, Ovarense, Académica and Benfica, and at the Proliga, Illiabum, Sampaense and Galitos. A year later, the tournament changed format again and the Proliga and LPB played in one single competitions. To determine four teams for a Final Four, two stages of competition were needed, running from 3 to 24 October. The Final Four was played in Leiria, at Pavilhão dos Pousos, putting up Benfica against Académica and Vitória de Guimarães with Ovarense. Vitória beat Ovarense by 83–82, and Benfica defeated Académica by 80–50. However, the final itself was postponed after the collapse and sudden death of Kevin Widemond at the half time of the match between Ovarense and Académica to determine the third place. The final was rescheduled to 1 November, at the Pavilhão Multidesportos de Coimbra, where Vitória de Guimarães beat Benfica 76–69, aided by the 18 points from Rod Nealy, who was man of the match.

Starting in 2010–11, the competition settled in its current format, with Proliga and LPB competing in separate levels. Four groups of three teams decided the finalists, who then played a Final Four to determine the winner. In the Proliga, the Final Four was played at Pavilhão Municipal de Barcelo and contained: Barcelos Hotel-Terço; Galitos FC; AngraBasket and Terceira Basket. Barcelos Hotel-Terço and AngraBasket qualified for the final, which AngraBasket won by 73–69. On the main level, the Final Four was played between Porto, Ovarense, Sampaense and Barreirense. The first two advanced to the final, where Julian Terrell and Carlos Andrade helped Porto overcame Ovarense by 68–59. Keeping its status as "curtain-raiser" for majority of teams, the fourth edition for LPB teams started on 30 September 2011 and the fifth for Proliga teams, began on 7 October. The LPB final put up Benfica against Porto, after eliminating Lusitânia and Ovarense, respectively. On the big game, Ted Scott scored 17 and Miguel Minhava, 11, to drive Benfica for 65–63 win over Porto. On the Proliga Final Four, Illiabum beat Guifões and Eléctrico FC defeated Algés. The next day, Illiabum won their second Troféu António Pratas after beating Eléctrico FC by 81–80.

The following year saw Benfica be the first club to successfully retain the trophy. After thrashing Galitos in the semis, they beat Académica in the final by 71–44, aided by the 14 points from Cláudio Fonseca. On the Proliga, Oliveirense beat Maia Basket by 81–64, to claim their first silverware in the tournament. The 2013–14 edition had much uncertainty in its ending. In the LPB, title-holders Benfica were eliminated by Sampaense, who met Ovarense in the final. Spaniard Sergi Brunet posted 12 points and helped Ovarense win their second trophy after 2008–09. In the other final, Eléctrico beat Dragon Force by 56–54, with Aylton Medeiros being the MVP. The seventh LPB edition witnessed Benfica re-establish their control over the competition. Jobey Thomas scored 27 points and guided Benfica for a third trophy in four years, after a 98–82 win against Barcelos. A few days later, at Proliga level, Dragon Force revenged their previous edition loss, and beat Esgueira by 97–41, winning their first António Pratas Trophy. The eighth edition continued with the same dominion of past editions. At top level, Benfica racked up another trophy after beating Oliveirense by 76–48, taking benefit of the 19 points of Jeremiah Wilson. In the Proliga, Sérgio Correia posted 19 points in an 85–75 win from Illiabum over Academia do Lumiar, helping them to their third honour. In 2016–17, the tournament was absent of the LPB calendar and was only played at Proliga level, with Terceira Basket winning it for the first time, after overtaking SC Vasco da Gama by 69-53. The tenth edition, again played only at Proliga level was won by Académica after beating Esgueira by 85-77, with Lawrence Coleman as MVP.

== Finals ==
| Year | Level | Final | | |
| Year | Level | Winner | Score | Runner-up |
|---|---|---|---|---|
| 2007–08 | Proliga | Benfica | 76–58 | Física Torres Novas |
| 2008–09 | LPB | Ovarense - Académica - Benfica | Round-robin | Vagos - Física Torres Novas - CAB Madeira |
| 2008–09 | Proliga | Illiabum - Sampaense - Galitos | Round-robin | Maia Basket - Eléctrico - Seixal |
| 2009–10 | Joint LPB/Proliga | Vitória de Guimarães | 76–59 | Benfica |
| 2010–11 | LPB | Porto | 68–59 | Ovarense |
| 2010–11 | Proliga | Angra Basket | 73–69 | Barcelos |
| 2011–12 | LPB | Benfica | 65–63 | Porto |
| 2011–12 | Proliga | Illiabum | 81–80 | Eléctrico |
| 2012–13 | LPB | Benfica | 71–44 | Académica |
| 2012–13 | Proliga | Oliveirense | 81–64 | Maia Basket |
| 2013–14 | LPB | Ovarense | 65–62 | Sampaense |
| 2013–14 | Proliga | Eléctrico | 56–54 | Dragon Force |
| 2014–15 | LPB | Benfica | 98–82 | Barcelos |
| 2014–15 | Proliga | Dragon Force | 97–41 | Esgueira |
| 2015–16 | LPB | Benfica | 76–48 | Oliveirense |
| 2015–16 | Proliga | Illiabum | 85–75 | Academia do Lumiar |
| 2016–17 | Proliga | Terceira Basket | 69–53 | Vasco da Gama |
| 2017–18 | Proliga | Académica | 85–77 | Esgueira |
| 2018–19 | Proliga | Académica | 83–69 | Barreirense |
| 2019–20 | Proliga | Imortal | 73–45 | Académica |
| 2022–23 | Proliga | Portimonense | 71–68 | Illiabum |

== Performance by club ==
=== LPB ===
| Club | Winners | Runners-up | Years won | Years runner-up |
|---|---|---|---|---|
| Benfica | 5 | 1 | 2009, 2012, 2013, 2015, 2016 | 2010 |
| Ovarense | 2 | 1 | 2009, 2014 | 2011 |
| Académica | 1 | 1 | 2009 | 2013 |
| Porto | 1 | 1 | 2011 | 2012 |
| Vitória de Guimarães | 1 | 0 | 2010 | — |
| Vagos | 0 | 1 | — | 2009 |
| Física Torres Novas | 0 | 1 | — | 2009 |
| CAB Madeira | 0 | 1 | — | 2009 |
| Sampaense | 0 | 1 | — | 2014 |
| Barcelos | 0 | 1 | — | 2015 |
| Oliveirense | 0 | 1 | — | 2016 |

=== Proliga ===
| Club | Winners | Runners-up | Years won | Years runner-up |
|---|---|---|---|---|
| Illiabum | 3 | 1 | 2009, 2012, 2016 | 2023 |
| Académica | 2 | 1 | 2018, 2019 | 2020 |
| Eléctrico | 1 | 2 | 2014 | 2009, 2012 |
| Dragon Force | 1 | 1 | 2015 | 2014 |
| Benfica | 1 | 0 | 2008 | — |
| Sampaense | 1 | 0 | 2009 | — |
| Galitos | 1 | 0 | 2009 | — |
| Angra Basket | 1 | 0 | 2011 | — |
| Oliveirense | 1 | 0 | 2013 | — |
| Terceira Basket | 1 | 0 | 2017 | — |
| Imortal | 1 | 0 | 2020 | — |
| Portimonense | 1 | 0 | 2023 | — |
| Maia Basket | 0 | 2 | — | 2009, 2013 |
| Esgueira | 0 | 2 | — | 2015, 2018 |
| Física | 0 | 1 | — | 2008 |
| Seixal | 0 | 1 | — | 2009 |
| Barcelos | 0 | 1 | — | 2011 |
| Academia do Lumiar | 0 | 1 | — | 2016 |
| Vasco da Gama | 0 | 1 | — | 2017 |
| Barreirense | 0 | 1 | — | 2019 |
