= Lithuania at EuroBasket 2011 =

== Eurobasket 2011 roster ==
Complete roster of the team for Eurobasket 2011 in Lithuania:

=== Main roster ===
Lithuanian National Basketball Team roster
Players
Coaches

Pos.	No.	Name	Age – Date of birth	Height	Club	Ctr.
G	4	Rimantas Kaukėnas	34 – 11 April 1977	1.94 m (6 ft 4 in)	Montepaschi Siena	(Italy)
PG	5	Mantas Kalnietis	24 – 6 September 1986	1.96 m (6 ft 5 in)	BC Žalgiris	(Lithuania)
G	6	Tomas Delininkaitis	30 – 11 July 1981	1.90 m (6 ft 3 in)	BC Žalgiris	(Lithuania)
G/F	7	Martynas Pocius	25 – 28 April 1986	1.96 m (6 ft 5 in)	Real Madrid Baloncesto	(Spain)
F	8	Paulius Jankūnas	27 – 29 April 1984	2.06 m (6 ft 9 in)	BC Žalgiris	(Lithuania)
F/C	9	Darius Songaila	33 – 14 February 1978	2.06 m (6 ft 9 in)	Galatasaray Café Crown	(Turkey)
SF	10	Simas Jasaitis	29 – 26 March 1982	2.01 m (6 ft 7 in)	Türk Telekom B.K.	(Turkey)
C	11	Jonas Valančiūnas	19 – 6 May 1992	2.13 m (7 ft 0 in)	BC Lietuvos Rytas	(Lithuania)
F/C	12	Kšyštof Lavrinovič	31 – 1 November 1979	2.10 m (6 ft 11 in)	Montepaschi Siena	(Italy)
PG	13	Šarūnas Jasikevičius	35 – 5 March 1976	1.93 m (6 ft 4 in)	Fenerbahçe Ülker	(Turkey)
C	14	Marijonas Petravičius (injured)	31 – 24 October 1979	2.09 m (6 ft 10 in)	Beşiktaş Cola Turka	(Turkey)
C	15	Robertas Javtokas (C)	31 – 20 March 1980	2.11 m (6 ft 11 in)	BC Žalgiris	(Lithuania)

Head coach

- (Lithuania) Kęstutis Kemzūra

Assistant coach(es)

- (Lithuania) Robertas Kuncaitis
- (Lithuania) Donaldas Kairys

Athletic trainer

- (Lithuania) Evaldas Kandratavičius

Legend

- (C) Team captain
- Club field describes current pro club

== Depth chart ==
Pos.	Starting 5	Bench 1	Bench 2	Inactive
C	Robertas Javtokas	Jonas Valančiūnas		Marijonas Petravičius
PF	Paulius Jankūnas	Darius Songaila	Kšyštof Lavrinovič
SF	Simas Jasaitis	Martynas Pocius
SG	Rimantas Kaukėnas	Tomas Delininkaitis
PG	Mantas Kalnietis	Šarūnas Jasikevičius

== Preparation matches ==
Note: All times are UTC+2

August 4
TBA

Lithuania	70–72	Slovenia

Švyturio Arena, Klaipėda, Lithuania

August 6
TBA

Lithuania	94–73	Czech Republic

Švyturio Arena, Klaipėda, Lithuania

August 10
TBA

Russia	91–76	Lithuania

Moscow, Russia

August 14
TBA

Spain	90–78	Lithuania

Madrid, Spain

August 18
TBA

Lithuania	88–76	Spain

Žalgiris Arena, Kaunas, Lithuania

August 19
TBA

Lithuania	80–88	Russia

Cido Arena, Panevėžys, Lithuania

August 20
TBA

Lithuania	95–75	Latvia

Cido Arena, Panevėžys, Lithuania

August 24
TBA

Slovenia	80–66	Lithuania

Ljubliana, Slovenia

August 27
TBA

Lithuania	88–80	Georgia

Siemens Arena, Vilnius, Lithuania

== Eurobasket 2011 ==
Note: All times are local

=== Preliminary round ===
August 31, 2011
21:00

Report

Lithuania	80–69	Great Britain
Scoring by quarter: 19–18, 30–21, 5–18, 26–12
Pts: Kaukėnas 16; Rebs: three players 6 Asts: Kalnietis 5		Pts: Deng 25; Rebs: Deng 10; Asts: Deng 4

Cido Arena, Panevėžys
Attendance: 6,900
Referees: Sreten Radovic (CRO), Robert Vyklicky (CZE), Petar Obradovic (BIH)

September 1, 2011
21:00

Report

Poland	77–97	Lithuania
Scoring by quarter: 20–25, 18–28, 14–23, 25–21
Pts: Kelati 16; Rebs: Lapeta 6 Asts: Koszarek 4		Pts: Kalnietis 19; Rebs: Lavrinovič 9 Asts: Kalnietis 6

Cido Arena, Panevėžys
Attendance: 6,900
Referees: Spyridon Gontas (GRE), Zoran Sutulovic (MNE), Sergey Mikhaylov (RUS)

September 2, 2011
21:00

Report

Turkey	68–75	Lithuania
Scoring by quarter: 17–19, 18–13, 14–19, 19–24
Pts: İlyasova 20; Rebs: Aşık 13; Asts: Türkoğlu 4		Pts: Songaila 12; Rebs: Javtokas 6 Asts: Jasikevičius 7

Cido Arena, Panevėžys
Attendance: 5,500
Referees: Sreten Radovic (CRO), Spyridon Gontas (GRE), Sergiy Zashchuk (UKR)

September 4, 2011
21:00

Report

Lithuania	79–91	Spain
Scoring by quarter: 12–31, 24–31, 23–19, 20–10
Pts: Valančiūnas 13; Rebs: Lavrinovič 8 Asts: five players 3		Pts: Navarro 22; Rebs: Ibaka 9 Asts: five players 4

Cido Arena, Panevėžys
Attendance: 5,684
Referees: Sreten Radovic (CRO), Damir Javor (SLO), Petri Mäntylä (FIN)

September 5, 2011
21:00

Report

Portugal	69–98	Lithuania
Scoring by quarter: 16–28, 19–13, 15–27, 19–30
Pts: Andrade 16; Rebs: Fonseca, Andrade 5 Asts: da Silva 5		Pts: Pocius, Jasikevičius 14; Rebs: Valančiūnas, Lavrinovič 7 Asts: three players 3

Cido Arena, Panevėžys
Attendance: 5,684
Referees: Sergey Mikhaylov (RUS), Petar Obradovic (BIH), Sergiy Zashchuk (UKR)

=== Second round ===
September 7, 2011
21:00

Report

Serbia	90–100	Lithuania
Scoring by quarter: 24–26, 20–28, 24–24, 22–22
Pts: Krstić 21; Rebs: four players 4 Asts: Rašić 4		Pts: Kalnietis 19; Rebs: Jankūnas 7 Asts: Jasikevičius, Kalnietis 7

Siemens Arena, Vilnius
Attendance: 11,000
Referees: Luigi Lamonica (ITA), Damir Javor (SLO), Olegs Latisevs (LAT)

September 9, 2011
21:00

Report

Lithuania	67–73	France
Scoring by quarter: 16–18, 12–16, 18–9, 21–30
Pts: Jasaitis 13; Rebs: Jankūnas 9 Asts: Jasikevičius 6		Pts: De Colo 21; Rebs: Noah 13; Asts: Batum 3

Siemens Arena, Vilnius
Attendance: 11,000
Referees: Christos Christodoulou (GRE), Fernando Rocha (POR), Petri Mäntylä (FIN)

September 11, 2011
21:00

Report

Lithuania	84–75	Germany
Scoring by quarter: 21–17, 16–16, 21–19, 26–23
Pts: Kaukėnas 19; Rebs: Jasaitis 9 Asts: Jasikevičius 4		Pts: Kaman 25; Rebs: Kaman 11; Asts: Kaman 2

Siemens Arena, Vilnius
Attendance: 11,000
Referees: Fabio Facchini (ITA), Spyridon Gontas (GRE), Sergey Mikhaylov (RUS)

=== Knockout stage ===
Quarterfinals

September 14
21:00

Report

North Macedonia	67–65	Lithuania
Scoring by quarter: 18–20, 12–14, 19–18, 18–13
Pts: McCalebb 23; Rebs: Samardžiski 10; Asts: Ilievski 3		Pts: Javtokas 13; Rebs: Kalnietis 9 Asts: Jasikevičius 5

Žalgiris Arena, Kaunas
Attendance: 15,000
Referees: Luigi Lamonica (ITA), Damir Javor (SLO), Fernando Rocha (POR)

Classification 5–8

September 15
15:30

Report

Slovenia	77–80	Lithuania
Scoring by quarter: 20-19, 13-25, 24-19, 20-17
Pts: Lorbek, G. Dragić 16; Rebs: Smodiš 6 Asts: Lakovič, G. Dragić 4		Pts: Kalnietis 17; Rebs: Valančiūnas 6 Asts: Jasikevičius 7

Žalgiris Arena, Kaunas
Attendance: 11,000
Referees: Fabio Facchini (ITA), Srdan Dozai (CRO), Spyridon Gontas (GRE)

Fifth place game

September 17
21:00

Report

Lithuania	73–69	Greece
Scoring by quarter: 14-20, 18-17, 24-11, 17-21
Pts: Pocius 13; Rebs: Javtokas 10; Asts: Kalnietis 3		Pts: Calathes 16; Rebs: Fotsis 10; Asts: Calathes 7

Žalgiris Arena, Kaunas
Attendance: 14,000
Referees: Miguel Perez Perez (ESP), David Chambon (FRA), Marius Ciulin (ROU)
