= Cláudio Fonseca =

Portuguese basketball player (born 1989)

No. 17 – CAB Madeira
- Position: Center

Personal information
- Born: January 22, 1989 (age 37) Lisbon, Portugal
- Listed height: 6 ft 9.5 in (2.07 m)
- Listed weight: 225 lb (102 kg)

Career information
- Playing career: 2007–present

Career history
- 2006–2008: Valencia BC II
- 2008: Valencia BC
- 2008–2009: CB Peñas Huesca
- 2009: CB Almàssera
- 2009–2010: Lucentum Alicante
- 2010–2012: Vitória de Guimarães
- 2012: Plasencia
- 2012–2016: Benfica
- 2016: → Palma Air Europa (loan)
- 2016–2017: Palma Air Europa
- 2017–2019: Benfica
- 2019–2021: Sporting CP
- 2021–present: CAB Madeira

Cláudio dos Santos Fonseca (born January 22, 1989) is a Portuguese professional basketball player who plays as a center for CAB Madeira.

== Club career ==
Born in Lisbon, Fonseca basketball career started in 2006, when at 17, he joined the junior team of Valencia BC, where he would stay for two seasons, before progressing into their reserve team, who competed in the Liga EBA, the fourth tier of Spanish basketball.

He made his debut for the first team on 14 October 2007 in a league game against Bàsquet Manresa, and debuted on the European stage on 19 February 2008 in a match for the 2007–08 ULEB Cup, against Panionios B.C. In the following season, Fonseca was loaned out to gain experience, joining CB Peñas Huesca on 30 July 2008. He stayed there briefly, being release on 3 February 2009, to complete the season at CB Almàssera. Already a free player, Fonseca played one season with CB Lucentum Alicante in their return to the top tier.

He returned to Portugal on 8 July 2010, signing with Vitória de Guimarães, and competing there for nearly two seasons, until he moved abruptly to LEB Plata team, Plasencia, on 8 February 2012.

On 18 September 2012, Fonseca returned to Portugal to play for Benfica, helping them win three league titles, fifteen other cups, and also debuting in European competitions, in the 2014–15 EuroChallenge. Halfway through 2015–16, the 27-year old moved back to Spain, representing Palma Air Europa on a six-month loan deal. The move was made permanent in July 2016, with Fonseca signing for one year with the LEB Oro-side. In March 2017, Fonseca returned to Benfica. In July 2019, was announced in Sporting CP.

== International career ==
Fonseca represented his national team on all three youth levels, always in Division B. In 2011, he helped Portugal reach the EuroBasket for the third time in their history, finishing the finals in 21st place.

== Honours ==
Benfica

- Portuguese League: 2012–13, 2013–14, 2014–15
- Portuguese Cup: 2013–14, 2014–15
- League Cup / Hugo dos Santos Cup: 2012–13, 2013–14, 2014–15
- Portuguese Supercup: 2012, 2013, 2014, 2015
- António Pratas Trophy: 2012, 2014, 2015
