= Carlos Andrade =

Sudanese basketball player (born 1978)

Personal information
- Born: April 27, 1978 (age 48) Santiago, Cape Verde
- Listed height: 6 ft 6 in (1.98 m)
- Listed weight: 240 lb (109 kg)

Career information
- College: Queens (1999–2003)
- NBA draft: 2003: undrafted
- Playing career: 1996–2018
- Position: Small forward

Career history
- 1996–1999: Portugal Telecom
- 2003–2004: Porto
- 2004–2005: Queluz
- 2005–2006: Skyliners Frankfurt
- 2006–2007: Benfica
- 2007–2009: San Sebastián Gipuzkoa BC
- 2009–2012: Porto
- 2012–2018: Benfica

Career highlights
- 7× Portuguese League champion (2004, 2005, 2011, 2013–2015, 2017); 8× Portuguese Cup champion (2004, 2005, 2010, 2012, 2014-2017); 9× Portuguese Supercup champion (2004, 2005, 2010–2015, 2017); 8× Portuguese League Cup champion (2004, 2009, 2012-2015, 2017, 2018); 4× António Pratas Trophy champion (2011, 2013, 2015, 2016)

Carlos Eduardo Fernandes Vieira de Andrade (born April 27, 1978) is a former Portuguese basketball player who played as a small forward.

Andrade played college basketball in the United States, and had brief spells in Germany and Spain. He is the younger brother of former WNBA player, Mery Andrade, who competed for the Cleveland Rockers and the Charlotte Sting.

== Career ==
Born Santiago, Cape Verde, Andrade started playing as a 16-year-old in the basketball division of the telecommunications company, Portugal Telecom, before he moved to the United States to play in the NCAA with the Queens University on 4 June 1999.

At Queens University, Andrade made part of the team that reached three consecutive Elite Eight finals, being nominated for Conference All-Tournament award in 2001-02. He left as Queens’ All-time Leading Rebounder, with 755, a record surpassed in 2006 by Kendrick Harris.

In 2003, he returned to Portugal, and joined FC Porto, becoming part of a squad that conquered four titles in one season. The 26-year-old then moved to C.A. Queluz and helped the team win its first league title in 21 years, while also debuting in European competitions, averaging 13.1 points per game in the 2004–05 ULEB Cup.

In 2006, Andrade made his first venture in European basketball, when he joined Skyliners Frankfurt in the Bundesliga, finishing in 14th place with the Frankfurt team, and playing another year in the ULEB Cup, with an average of 7.2 points per game.

He returned to Portugal for one season to compete for S.L. Benfica, before embarking on his second European adventure in two years, joining San Sebastián Gipuzkoa BC on 18 July 2007, helping the Basque team win the 2005–06 LEB season, and achieve 12th place in the 2008–09 ACB season.

On 1 September 2009, the 31-year-old rejoined Porto for a second time, winning a Portuguese Cup in his first season, and the league title in his second. When his contract with the Porto expired on 3 August 2012, Andrade moved to Benfica and became an important part of the team, winning four league titles and 17 other conquests, as the club returned to European basketball in the 2014–15 EuroChallenge. He retired at the end of 2017–18, at age 40.

== Honours ==
Porto

- Portuguese Basketball League (LCB): 2003–04, 2010–11
- Portuguese Cup: 2003–04, 2009–10. 2011-12
- Portuguese Basketball Super Cup: 2004, 2010, 2011
- League Cup: 2003–04, 2009-10, 2011-12
- António Pratas Trophy: 2011

Queluz

- Portuguese Basketball League (LCB): 2004–05
- Portuguese Cup: 2004–05
- Portuguese Basketball Super Cup: 2005

Benfica

- Portuguese Basketball League (LCB): 2012–13, 2013–14, 2014–15, 2016–17
- Portuguese Cup: 2013–14, 2014–15, 2015–16, 2016–17
- Portuguese Basketball Super Cup: 2012, 2013, 2014, 2015, 2017
- League Cup: 2012–13, 2013–14, 2014–15, 2016–17, 2017–18
- António Pratas Trophy: 2013, 2015, 2016
