= S.L. Benfica (basketball) =

Portuguese professional basketball team

Benfica
- Nickname: As Águias (The Eagles); Os Encarnados (The Reds)
- Leagues: Liga Portuguesa de Basquetebol; Europe Cup
- Founded: 20 March 1927 (99 years ago)
- History: S.L. Benfica (1927–present)
- Arena: Pavilhão Fidelidade
- Capacity: 2,400
- Location: Lisbon, Portugal
- Team colours: Red and white
- President: Rui Costa
- Team manager: João Nuno Crespo
- Head coach: Ainars Bagatskis
- Championships: 31 Portuguese Leagues; 23 Portuguese Cups; 13 Portuguese League Cups; 16 Portuguese Supercups
- Retired numbers: 2 (5, 7)
- Website: slbenfica.pt
Home	Away	Third

Sport Lisboa e Benfica (Portuguese pronunciation: [sɨˈpɔɾ liʒˈβoɐ i βɐ̃jˈfikɐ]), commonly known as Benfica, is a professional basketball team based in Lisbon, Portugal, that plays in the Liga Portuguesa de Basquetebol (LPB), where they are the current champions. Founded in 1927, it is the senior representative side of the basketball section of multi-sports club S.L. Benfica.

In June 2007, the club decided to leave the professional top league, then known as LCB, and join the Proliga, a league organized by the Portuguese Basketball Federation. From 2008 onwards, they returned to the LPB after the federation took control of the competition.

Benfica is the most successful Portuguese club, having the record for most championships (31), cups (23), league cups (13), super cups (16), and other national competitions plus the Supertaça da Lusofonia, totalling 95 trophies. It is also the Portuguese team that advanced the furthest in the European top club championship, now known as EuroLeague.

Some of their most memorable moments were European victories against clubs that have won the Euroleague, such as Virtus Bologna, Real Madrid, Cantù, Cibona, Joventut Badalona, Panathinaikos, Partizan, CSKA Moscow, and Varese.

Along with its several youth teams, which play in their respective top division championships, Benfica also has a developmental basketball team, Benfica B, that plays in the Proliga, the second highest tier in Portugal.

== History ==
=== Early years ===
Created on 20 March 1927, the basketball team followed the steps of many other sports that were supported by the club, achieving great success almost immediately. The team established itself as a main contender by the 1940s and during the whole 1960s gained the status of championship favourite and was already the club with the most titles won. By this time the club had won eight national championships and eight cups. This dominating spell decreased the following decade until the early 1980s. During this time span, Benfica would win only two championships, in the 1969–70 and the 1974–75 season, but won four national cups, the second most prestigious Portuguese tournament, in 1969–70, 1971–72, 1972–73 and 1973–74. After these years, Benfica again dominated the national scene.

=== Golden years ===
The most successful period of the club was between 1985 and 1995. In eleven seasons, the team won ten national titles, seven of which in a row, five national cups, five league cups and six super cups, achieving the best season ever by a Portuguese basketball team in 1994–95 winning the Portuguese League, Portuguese League Cup, Portuguese Super Cup, Portuguese Basketball Cup and finishing the European Champions' Cup in the Top 16. One of the highlight from that European Champions' Cup season was a 22-point victory (102–80) against CSKA Moscow in Lisbon on 12 January 1995. Benfica also made successful international campaigns in the other seasons considering the budget the team had compared with other European big teams. Some of the most successful of those campaigns include the 1993–94, when Benfica was close to reach the Top 8, and for a third season in a row Benfica managed to reach the Top 16 again in the European Champions' Cup, in 1995–96, grabbing a win against Panathinaikos, the eventual champions.

=== Decline in the late 1990s ===
This period was followed by a dark era in which Benfica was internally overshadowed by Ovarense, Portugal Telecom and FC Porto. Even though this period is considered to be a dark one, Benfica did manage to reach the LPB final once as well as winning Super Cups and finishing runners-up in the national cup and in the league cup. Also noteworthy is an away win against Real Madrid, in the 1996–97 EuroCup, the same season the Spaniards won the competition. The team finally decided to withdraw from the top tier and applied for the second league, the Proliga, which was the highest division run by the Federação Portuguesa de Basquetebol. However the first division was folded and the LPB (league) was again being overviewed by the national federation. This allowed the team to make a comeback to the main league.

=== Revival in the late 2000s ===
After more than a decade without any titles and in the same season Benfica had made a return to the first league, the 2008–09 season, the team won the Portuguese League, with a perfect score of 100% wins during the regular season, becoming the second team in the world to do so, after Maccabi Tel Aviv in the 1970s, and thrashing Ovarense 4–0 in the best-of-four game final. Benfica won the championship again the following season with a 91% winning record in the regular stage and a 4–1 final against Porto. The recent success brought the team to participate in the EuroChallenge, thus marking the end of a mid-term long hiatus from Portuguese clubs in European basketball competitions.

=== 2010s ===
In 2010–11, Benfica won the Taça da Liga and the Supertaça, but did not retain the championship, losing 4–3 in the final to Porto. In the following season, Benfica regained the national title after defeating Porto on their home court, the Dragão Caixa, by 56–53 in the decisive game of the best-of-five playoff series (3–2). Benfica retained the title in 2012–13, losing only two games in the season, one in the regular phase and one in the playoff final, both in overtime, and won every domestic trophy except the Taça de Portugal, where they were defeated by Vitória de Guimarães in the final.

On 23 May 2014, Benfica defeated Vitória de Guimarães 3–0 in the playoff final and secured its 25th national title (third consecutive), completing the domestic treble of League, Taça de Portugal, and Taça Hugo dos Santos. They won four trophies in total that season, including the 2013 Supertaça.

In the 2014–15 season, Benfica returned to European competition, competing in the 2014–15 EuroChallenge, where they finished third in Group E. Domestically, Benfica won all five competitions of the season. At the start of the 2015–16 season, Benfica won their fifth consecutive Taça de Portugal and fourth consecutive António Pratas Trophy, setting a club record of ten consecutive domestic trophies. In 2016–17, Benfica achieved the domestic treble of Taça Hugo dos Santos, Taça de Portugal, and the league title.

=== 2020s ===
In the 2021–22 season, after a four-year trophy drought, Benfica won the league title (3–1) defeating Porto on its home court, Dragão Caixa. In September 2022, Benfica qualified for the regular season of the 2022–23 Basketball Champions League, becoming the first Portuguese team to do so. Benfica reached the second round and won both the league and the Taça de Portugal, securing the championship inside Pavilhão João Rocha.

In 2023–24, the club again qualified for the Basketball Champions League regular season and won its third consecutive league title, along with the Taça Hugo dos Santos and the Supertaça. In 2024–25, Benfica qualified for its third consecutive Basketball Champions League regular season and won its fourth consecutive league title, clinching the title at the Dragão Caixa.

== Seasons ==
=== Key ===
- Before 1983-84 most league editions were played in league format, after that season started being played in the current format with a regular season and then play-offs.

=== Seasons ===
As of 14 June 2026

Season	Pos	Playoffs	Cup	League Cup	Super Cup	European competitions		Other competitions	
Season	League		Cup	League Cup	Super Cup	Competition	Result	Competition	Result
1926–27	—	—	—	—	—	—	—	—	—
1927–28	—	—	—	—	—	—	—	Campeonato Regional de Lisboa	3rd
1928–29	—	—	—	—	—	—	—	Campeonato Regional de Lisboa	3rd
1929–30	—	—	—	—	—	—	—	Campeonato Regional de Lisboa	5th
1930–31	—	—	—	—	—	—	—	Campeonato Regional de Lisboa	4th
1931–32	—	—	—	—	—	—	—	Campeonato Regional de Lisboa	5th
1932–33	4th	—	—	—	—	—	—	—	—
1933–34	4th	—	—	—	—	—	—	—	—
1934–35	8th	—	—	—	—	—	—	—	—
1935–36	2nd	—	—	—	—	—	—	—	—
1936–37	4th	—	—	—	—	—	—	—	—
1937–38	2nd	—	—	—	—	—	—	—	—
1938–39	4th	—	—	—	—	—	—	—	—
1939–40	W	—	—	—	—	—	—	—	—
1940–41	RU	—	—	—	—	—	—	—	—
1941–42	RU	—	—	—	—	—	—	—	—
1942–43	2R	—	—	—	—	—	—	—	—
1943–44	SF	—	—	—	—	—	—	—	—
1944–45	3rd	—	QF	—	—	—	—	—	—
1945–46	1st	—	W	—	—	—	—	—	—
1946–47	1st	—	W	—	—	—	—	—	—
1947–48	3rd	—	RU	—	—	—	—	—	—
1948–49	—	—	—	—	—	—	—	—	—
1949–50	6th	—	—	—	—	—	—	—	—
1950–51	2nd	—	—	—	—	—	—	—	—
1951–52	2nd	—	—	—	—	—	—	—	—
1952–53	4th	—	—	—	—	—	—	—	—
1953–54	4th	—	QF	—	—	—	—	—	—
1954–55	2nd	—	R16	—	—	—	—	—	—
1955–56	5th	—	—	—	—	—	—	—	—
1956–57	3rd	—	1R	—	—	—	—	—	—
1957–58	4th	—	4R	—	—	—	—	—	—
1958–59	4th	—	RU	—	—	—	—	—	—
1959–60	3rd	—	RU	—	—	—	—	—	—
1960–61	1st	—	W	—	—	—	—	—	—
1961–62	1st	—	R16	—	—	European Cup	1R	—	—
1962–63	1st	—	RU	—	—	European Cup	1R	—	—
1963–64	1st	—	W	—	—	European Cup	2R	—	—
1964–65	1st	—	W	—	—	—	—	—	—
1965–66	—	—	W	—	—	European Cup	1R	—	—
1966–67	—	—	QF	—	—	Cup Winner's Cup	1R	—	—
1967–68	—	—	W	—	—	—	—	—	—
1968–69	—	—	W	—	—	Cup Winner's Cup	2R	—	—
1969–70	1st	—	W	—	—	Cup Winner's Cup	1R	—	—
1970–71	—	—	QF	—	—	European Cup	1R	—	—
1971–72	—	—	W	—	—	—	—	—	—
1972–73	2nd	—	W	—	—	Cup Winner's Cup	2R	—	—
1973–74	3rd	—	W	—	—	Cup Winner's Cup	1R	—	—
1974–75	1st	—	RU	—	—	—	—	—	—
1975–76	5th	—	R16	—	—	—	—	—	—
1976–77	7th	—	SF	—	—	—	—	—	—
1977–78	4th	—	QF	—	—	—	—	—	—
1978–79	3rd	—	SF	—	—	—	—	—	—
1979–80	5th	—	R32	—	—	—	—	—	—
1980–81	3rd	—	W	—	—	—	—	—	—
1981–82	3rd	—	RU	—	—	Cup Winners Cup	1R	—	—
1982–83	2nd	—	RU	—	—	—	—	—	—
1983–84	7th	—	QF	—	—	—	—	—	—
1984–85	—	W	RU	—	—	—	—	—	—
1985–86	—	W	QF	—	W	—	—	—	—
1986–87	—	W	RU	—	RU	European Cup	1R	—	—
1987–88	—	RU	RU	—	RU	European Cup	2R	—	—
1988–89	—	W	QF	—	—	Korać Cup	1R	—	—
1989–90	—	W	RU	W	W	European Cup	1R	—	—
1990–91	—	W	SF	W	RU	European Cup	1R	—	—
1991–92	—	W	W	7th	W	European League	2R	—	—
1992–93	—	W	W	W	RU	European League	2R	—	—
1993–94	—	W	W	W	RU	European League	GS	—	—
1994–95	—	W	W	W	W	European League	GS	—	—
1995–96	—	RU	W	W	W	European League	GS	—	—
1996–97	—	QF	QF	RU	W	EuroCup	R32	—	—
1997–98	—	QF	RU	3rd	—	Korać Cup	GS	—	—
1998–99	—	QF	SF	GS	W	Korać Cup	GS	—	—
1999–00	—	QF	QF	—	—	—	—	—	—
2000–01	3rd	QF	SF	RU	—	—	—	—	—
2001–02	9th	—	SF	QF	—	—	—	—	—
2002–03	8th	QF	QF	QF	—	—	—	—	—
2003–04	11th	R16	—	—	—	—	—	—	—
2004–05	4th	QF	QF	QF	—	ULEB Cup	GS	—	—
2005–06	6th	SF	RU	QF	—	—	—	—	—
2006–07	2nd	SF	QF	RU	—	—	—	—	—
2007–08	1st	SF	QF	—	—	—	—	Troféu António Pratas	W
2008–09	1st	W	SF	—	—	—	—	—	—
2009–10	1st	W	QF	SF	W	—	—	Supertaça da Lusofonia	W
2010–11	2nd	RU	R16	W	W	—	—	—	—
2011–12	2nd	W	SF	SF	—	—	—	Troféu António Pratas	W
2012–13	1st	W	RU	W	W	—	—	Troféu António Pratas	W
2013–14	1st	W	W	W	W	—	—	—	—
2014–15	1st	W	W	W	W	—	—	Troféu António Pratas	W
2015–16	1st	RU	W	RU	W	—	—	Troféu António Pratas	W
2016–17	2nd	W	W	W	RU	—	—	—	—
2017–18	2nd	SF	RU	W	W	Europe Cup	GS	—	—
2018–19	2nd	RU	QF	RU	—	Europe Cup	2Q	—	—
2019–20	2nd	N/A	SF	RU	—	Europe Cup	2R	—	—
2020–21	4th	SF	SF	SF	—	—	—	—	—
2021–22	1st	W	RU	RU	—	Europe Cup	2R	—	—
2022–23	2nd	W	W	SF	RU	Champions League	QR	—	—
2023–24	2nd	W	RU	W	W	Champions League	GS	—	—
2024–25	1st	W	SF	SF	RU	Champions League	GS	—	—
2025–26	1st	RU	R16	RU	W	Champions League	GS	—	—

== Results in international competition ==
Note: Benfica score is always listed first.

Season	Competition	Round	Opposition	Score	Agg.
1961–62	FIBA European Champions Cup	Qualifying round	(Italy) Pallacanestro Varese	49–73 (H); 48–101 (A)	97–174
1962–63	FIBA European Champions Cup	Qualifying round	(Spain) Real Madrid	61–97 (H); 47–110 (A)	108–207
1963–64	FIBA European Champions Cup	Qualifying round	—	Bye	—
1963–64	FIBA European Champions Cup	First round	(Poland) Legia Warsaw	Forfeit (0–4)	0–4
1965–66	FIBA European Champions Cup	Qualifying round	(Morocco) Wydad Casablanca	54–53 (A); 76–77 (H); 61–63 (N)	191–193
1966–67	FIBA European Cup Winners' Cup	Qualifying round	(Spain) Joventut Badalona	38–107 (A); 57–118 (H)	95–225
1970–71	FIBA European Champions Cup	Qualifying round	(Hungary) Budapest Honvéd SE	67–112 (H); 66–118 (A)	133–230
1972–73	FIBA European Cup Winners' Cup	First qualifying round	(England) Sutton Basket	76–77 (A); 77–71 (H)	153–148
1972–73	FIBA European Cup Winners' Cup	Second qualifying round	(Belgium) Antwerp BC	86–83 (H); 80–120 (A)	166–203
1973–74	FIBA European Cup Winners' Cup	Second qualifying round	(Spain) Estudiantes Madrid	91–75 (H); 61–93 (A)	152–168
1981–82	FIBA European Cup Winners' Cup	First qualifying round	(Belgium) BBK Gent	81–83 (H); 81–101 (A)	162–184
1986–87	FIBA European Champions Cup	Qualifying round	(England) Manchester United	67–91 (A); 87–79 (H)	154–170
1987–88	FIBA European Champions Cup	Qualifying round	(Luxembourg) BBC Sparta Bertrange	122–77 (H); 108–84 (A)	230–85
1987–88	FIBA European Champions Cup	First round	(Israel) Maccabi Tel Aviv	86–111 (A); 79–81 (H)	165–192
1988–89	FIBA Korać Cup	Qualifying round	(Belgium) Antwerp Giants	75–83 (A); 95–88 (H)	170–171
1989–90	FIBA European Champions Cup	Qualifying round	(Italy) Olimpia Milano	99–112 (H); 73–92 (A)	172–204
1990–91	FIBA European Champions Cup	Qualifying round	(West Germany) Bayer Leverkusen	87–85 (H); 74–110 (A)	161–195
1991–92	FIBA European League	Preliminary round II	(France) Olympique Antibes	89–76 (H); 74–88 (A)	163–164
1991–92	FIBA European Cup	Preliminary round III	(Hungary) Szolnoki Olaj	100–69 (H); 75–84 (A)	175–153
1991–92	FIBA European Cup	Semi-final round Group B	(Slovenia) Union Olimpija	88–91 (A); 47–84 (H)	5th
1991–92	FIBA European Cup	Semi-final round Group B	(Greece) Panionios	77–89 (A); 88–76 (H)	5th
1991–92	FIBA European Cup	Semi-final round Group B	(Israel) Hapoel Galil Elyon	79–74 (H); 95–78 (A)	5th
1991–92	FIBA European Cup	Semi-final round Group B	(Spain) Real Madrid	75–78 (H); 79–102 (A)	5th
1991–92	FIBA European Cup	Semi-final round Group B	(France) Pau-Orthez	80–89 (A); 79–90 (H)	5th
1992–93	FIBA European League	Preliminary round I	(Luxembourg) Etzella Ettelbruck	113–72 (A); 105–58 (H)	218–130
1992–93	FIBA European League	Preliminary round II	(Israel) Maccabi Tel Aviv	75–89 (H); 81–100 (A)	156–189
1992–93	FIBA European Cup	Preliminary round III	(Bulgaria) CSKA Sofia	111–83 (H); 84–80 (A)	195–163
1992–93	FIBA European Cup	Semi-final round Group B	(France) Cholet Basket	98–82 (A); 84–73 (H)	4th
1992–93	FIBA European Cup	Semi-final round Group B	(Croatia) Split	60–70 (H); 56–79 (A)	4th
1992–93	FIBA European Cup	Semi-final round Group B	(Greece) Aris	67–75 (H); 72–83 (A)	4th
1992–93	FIBA European Cup	Semi-final round Group B	(Ukraine) Budivelnyk	77–79 (A); 88–75 (H)	4th
1992–93	FIBA European Cup	Semi-final round Group B	(Israel) Hapoel Galil Elyon	74–93 (A); 73–80 (H)	4th
1993–94	FIBA European League	Preliminary round I	(Israel) Hapoel Tel Aviv	75–83 (A); 87–67 (H)	162–150
1993–94	FIBA European League	Preliminary round II	(Slovenia) Union Olimpija	87–63 (H); 76–91 (A)	163–154
1993–94	FIBA European League	Semi-final round Group B	(Greece) Panathinaikos	73–83 (A); 69–76 (H)	6th
1993–94	FIBA European League	Semi-final round Group B	(Turkey) Anadolu Efes	61–77 (H); 67–80 (A)	6th
1993–94	FIBA European League	Semi-final round Group B	(Italy) Pallacanestro Cantù	65–74 (A); 83–64 (H)	6th
1993–94	FIBA European League	Semi-final round Group B	(Italy) Virtus Bologna	102–90 (H); 57–97 (A)	6th
1993–94	FIBA European League	Semi-final round Group B	(Croatia) Cibona	67–66 (H); 63–75 (A)	6th
1993–94	FIBA European League	Semi-final round Group B	(Spain) Joventut Badalona	76–79 (A); 78–89 (H)	6th
1993–94	FIBA European League	Semi-final round Group B	(France) Pau-Orthez	80–72 (A); 72–74 (H)	6th
1994–95	FIBA European League	Preliminary round II	(Hungary) Budapest Honvéd SE	94–85 (A); 96–89 (H)	190–174
1994–95	FIBA European League	Semi-final round Group A	(Russia) CSKA Moscow	61–103 (A); 102–80 (H)	8th
1994–95	FIBA European League	Semi-final round Group A	(Slovenia) Union Olimpija	81–84 (H); 56–64 (A)	8th
1994–95	FIBA European League	Semi-final round Group A	(Greece) PAOK	68–74 (A); 77–75 (H)	8th
1994–95	FIBA European League	Semi-final round Group A	(Greece) Panathinaikos	49–67 (H); 60–80 (A)	8th
1994–95	FIBA European League	Semi-final round Group A	(Spain) Real Madrid	54–70 (A); 62–66 (H)	8th
1994–95	FIBA European League	Semi-final round Group A	(Italy) Victoria Pesaro	75–88 (A); 69–88 (H)	8th
1994–95	FIBA European League	Semi-final round Group A	(Israel) Maccabi Tel Aviv	81–90 (H); 75–86 (A)	8th
1995–96	FIBA European League	Preliminary round II	(Socialist Federal Republic of Yugoslavia) Partizan Belgrade	64–64 (A); 112–95 (H)	176–159
1995–96	FIBA European League	Semi-final round Group B	(Croatia) Cibona	65–79 (H); 59–64 (A)	8th
1995–96	FIBA European League	Semi-final round Group B	(France) Pau-Orthez	61–76 (A); 99–90 (H)	8th
1995–96	FIBA European League	Semi-final round Group B	(Israel) Maccabi Tel Aviv	66–74 (A); 82–94 (H)	8th
1995–96	FIBA European League	Semi-final round Group B	(Italy) Virtus Bologna	83–85 (H); 81–97 (A)	8th
1995–96	FIBA European League	Semi-final round Group B	(Greece) Panathinaikos	51–67 (A); 96–87 (H)	8th
1995–96	FIBA European League	Semi-final round Group B	(Spain) Real Madrid	73–78 (H); 81–86 (A)	8th
1995–96	FIBA European League	Semi-final round Group B	(Spain) Barcelona	55–76 (H); 94–106 (A)	8th
1996–97	FIBA EuroCup	Group C	(Bulgaria) Spartak Pleven	98–111 (A); 95–75 (H)	3rd
1996–97	FIBA EuroCup	Group C	(Germany) ratiopharm Ulm	91–81 (H); 69–82 (A)	3rd
1996–97	FIBA EuroCup	Group C	(Israel) Hapoel Galil Elyon	78–64 (H); 85–92 (A)	3rd
1996–97	FIBA EuroCup	Group C	(Spain) Real Madrid	60–59 (A); 73–76 (H)	3rd
1996–97	FIBA EuroCup	Group C	(North Macedonia) MZT Skopje	77–75 (H); 73–75 (A)	3rd
1996–97	FIBA EuroCup	Last 16	(France) Paris Racing	63–81 (H); 86–80 (A)	149–161
1997–98	FIBA Korać Cup	Additional preliminary round	(Switzerland) Fribourg Olympic	66–67 (H); 78–63 (A)	144–130
1997–98	FIBA Korać Cup	Group F	(Netherlands) Den Helder Seals	80–56 (H); 76–63 (A)	3rd
1997–98	FIBA Korać Cup	Group F	(France) Montpellier	78–86 (A); 75–76 (H)	3rd
1997–98	FIBA Korać Cup	Group F	(Germany) Brose Baskets	93–95 (H); 77–89 (A)	3rd
1998–99	FIBA Korać Cup	Additional preliminary round	(Switzerland) SAV Vacallo Basket	80–74 (H); 84–72 (A)	164–146
1998–99	FIBA Korać Cup	Group H	(Israel) Maccabi Rishon	93–99 (H); 77–74 (A)	4th
1998–99	FIBA Korać Cup	Group H	(France) Les Mans Sarthe	72–78 (H); 65–78 (A)	4th
1998–99	FIBA Korać Cup	Group H	(Germany) Brose Baskets	59–70 (A); 63–69 (H)	4th
2004–05	ULEB Cup	Group G	(Germany) Baskets Bonn	71–74 (H); 62–80 (A)	6th
2004–05	ULEB Cup	Group G	(Poland) Śląsk Wrocław	83–85 (A); 60–70 (H)	6th
2004–05	ULEB Cup	Group G	(Lithuania) Lietuvos rytas	49–74 (A); 57–59 (H)	6th
2004–05	ULEB Cup	Group G	(Serbia and Montenegro) Red Star Belgrade	66–106 (H); 69–83 (A)	6th
2004–05	ULEB Cup	Group G	(Italy) Pompea Napoli	82–87 (A); 67–104 (H)	6th
2010–11	EuroChallenge	EuroChallenge qualifying round	(Ukraine) BC Ferro-ZNTU	105–105 (H); 77–72 (A)	182–177
2010–11	EuroChallenge	Group C	(Bulgaria) Lukoil Academic	71–92 (A); 86–79 (H)	2nd
2010–11	EuroChallenge	Group C	(Switzerland) Lugano Tigers	89–84 (H); 52–74 (A)	2nd
2010–11	EuroChallenge	Group C	(Estonia) Tartu Ülikool	80–74 (H); 64–80 (A)	2nd
2010–11	EuroChallenge	Last 16 Group K	(Latvia) Ventspils	65–100 (A); 71–74 (H)	4th
2010–11	EuroChallenge	Last 16 Group K	(France) Gravelines-Dunkerque	64–67 (H); 82–91 (A)	4th
2010–11	EuroChallenge	Last 16 Group K	(Sweden) Norrköping Dolphins	83–75 (H); 74–80 (A)	4th
2014–15	EuroChallenge	Group E	(Belgium) Belfius Mons-Hainaut	69–79 (H); 63–92 (A)	3rd
2014–15	EuroChallenge	Group E	(France) JSF Nanterre	68–80 (A); 86–96 (H)	3rd
2014–15	EuroChallenge	Group E	(Finland) Kataja Basket	93–90 (A); 107–82 (H)	3rd
2015–16	FIBA Europe Cup	Group B	(Croatia) Cibona	79–83 (H); 66–74 (A)	3rd
2015–16	FIBA Europe Cup	Group B	(Hungary) Soproni KC	78–65 (A); 91–62 (H)	3rd
2015–16	FIBA Europe Cup	Group B	(Belgium) Antwerp Giants	76–84 (A); 77–79 (H)	3rd
2016–17	Basketball Champions League	Second qualifying round	(Italy) Pallacanestro Varese	72–75 (H); 72–70 (A)	144–145
2016–17	FIBA Europe Cup	Group A	(Hungary) Alba Fehérvár	77–74 (H); 71–90 (A)	3rd
2016–17	FIBA Europe Cup	Group A	(France) Élan Chalon	76–90 (A); 77–69 (H)	3rd
2016–17	FIBA Europe Cup	Group A	(Belgium) Basic-Fit Brussels	79–74 (A); 75–80 (H)	3rd
2016–17	FIBA Europe Cup	Second round	(Bulgaria) Lukoil Academic	72–84 (A); 67–76 (H)	4th
2016–17	FIBA Europe Cup	Second round	(Netherlands) Donar	82–94 (H); 78–81 (A)	4th
2016–17	FIBA Europe Cup	Second round	(Russia) Enisey Krasnoyarsk	69–99 (A); 58–89 (H)	4th
2017–18	Basketball Champions League	First qualifying round	(Austria) Kapfenberg Bulls	75–72 (A); 67–62 (H)	142–134
2017–18	Basketball Champions League	Second qualifying round	(Bulgaria) Lukoil Academic	82–91 (H); 71–87 (A)	153–178
2017–18	FIBA Europe Cup	Group B	(Lithuania) Nevėžis	88–83 (H); 68–94 (A)	4th
2017–18	FIBA Europe Cup	Group B	(Denmark) Bakken Bears	76–95 (A); 95–108 (H)	4th
2017–18	FIBA Europe Cup	Group B	(Russia) Avtodor Saratov	86–97 (H); 71–110 (A)	4th
2018–19	FIBA Europe Cup	Second qualifying round	(Italy) Dinamo Sassari	66–100 (A); 92–111 (H)	158–211
2019–20	Basketball Champions League	First qualifying round	(Netherlands) Donar	95–65 (H); 66–76 (A)	161–141
2019–20	Basketball Champions League	Second qualifying round	(Montenegro) Mornar	68–96 (H); 82–71 (A)	150–167
2019–20	FIBA Europe Cup	Regular season Group A	(Netherlands) ZZ Leiden	103–99 (H); 68–84 (A)	1st
2019–20	FIBA Europe Cup	Regular season Group A	(Hungary) Pécs Veolia	89–81 (A); 85–66 (H)	1st
2019–20	FIBA Europe Cup	Regular season Group A	(Slovakia) Inter Bratislava	77–68 (H); 95–91 (A)	1st
2019–20	FIBA Europe Cup	Group I	(Belgium) Spirou Basket	89–62 (H); 85–78 (A)	3rd
2019–20	FIBA Europe Cup	Group I	(Germany) Medi Bayreuth	78–96 (A); 77–91 (H)	3rd
2019–20	FIBA Europe Cup	Group I	(Denmark) Bakken Bears	90–78 (H); 75–88 (A)	3rd
2021–22	FIBA Europe Cup	First qualifying round	(Romania) CSO Voluntari	83–77 (N)	83–77
2021–22	FIBA Europe Cup	Second qualifying round	(Netherlands) Donar	81–73 (N)	81–73
2021–22	FIBA Europe Cup	Regular season Group C	(Netherlands) Heroes Den Bosch	73–78 (H); 78–76 (A)	1st
2021–22	FIBA Europe Cup	Regular season Group C	(Russia) BC Parma	83–69 (H); 92-89 (A)	1st
2021–22	FIBA Europe Cup	Regular season Group C	(Czech Republic) BK Opava	99–89 (A); 86-84 (H)	1st
2021–22	FIBA Europe Cup	Group K	(Romania) CSM Oradea	56–68 (A); 94–57 (H)	3rd
2021–22	FIBA Europe Cup	Group K	(Poland) Trefl Sopot	67–79 (H); 67–76 (A)	3rd
2021–22	FIBA Europe Cup	Group K	(Portugal) Sporting CP	64–72 (H); 72–89 (A)	3rd
2022–23	FIBA Champions League	First qualifying round	(Kosovo) Golden Eagle Ylli	92–67 (H)	92–67
2022–23	FIBA Champions League	Second qualifying round	(Cyprus) Keravnos B.C.	73–65 (H)	73–65
2022–23	FIBA Champions League	Third qualifying round	(Germany) Bamberg Baskets	87–73 (H)	87–73
2022–23	FIBA Champions League	Group F	(Latvia) FK VEF Rīga	89–76 (A); 84–71 (H)	2nd
2022–23	FIBA Champions League	Group F	(France) Limoges CSP	68–67 (A); 59–79 (H)	2nd
2022–23	FIBA Champions League	Group F	(Spain) Bàsquet Manresa	78–97 (H); 92–82 (A)	2nd
2022–23	FIBA Champions League	Play-ins	(Turkey) Darüşşafaka Basketbol	76–89 (H); 72–83 (A)	148–172
2023–24	FIBA Champions League	First qualifying round	(Georgia (country)) BC TSU Tbilisi	112–62 (A)	112–62
2023–24	FIBA Champions League	Second qualifying round	(Cyprus) AEK Larnaca B.C.	87–59 (A)	87–59
2023–24	FIBA Champions League	Third qualifying round	(Sweden) Norrköping Dolphins	73–65 (A)	73–65
2023–24	FIBA Champions League	Group G	(Greece) PAOK BC	94–72 (H); 74–76 (A)	4th
2023–24	FIBA Champions League	Group G	(Israel) Hapoel Jerusalem B.C.	66–84 (H); 68–97 (A)	4th
2023–24	FIBA Champions League	Group G	(Turkey) Galatasaray	78–98 (A); 63–87 (H)	4th
2024–25	FIBA Champions League	First qualifying round	(Bulgaria) BC Rilski Sportist	89–88 (A)	89–88
2024–25	FIBA Champions League	Second qualifying round	(Switzerland) Fribourg Olympic Basket	91–85 (A)	91–85
2024–25	FIBA Champions League	Group G	(Spain) Bàsquet Manresa	64–92 (A); 80–91 (H)	4th
2024–25	FIBA Champions League	Group G	(Germany) Niners Chemnitz	75–103 (A); 79–68 (H)	4th
2024–25	FIBA Champions League	Group G	(Italy) Derthona Basket	58–72 (H); 71–77 (A)	4th
2025–26	FIBA Champions League	Group H	(Spanish Basketball Federation) Dreamland Gran Canaria	61–98 (H); 63–87 (A)	4th
2025–26	FIBA Champions League	Group H	(Basketball Federation of Serbia) Spartak Office Shoes	74–90 (H); 69–99 (A)	4th
2025–26	FIBA Champions League	Group H	(French Federation of Basketball) Le Mans	69–89 (A); 93–90 (H)	4th
2026–27	Basketball Champions League	First qualifying round	(Switzerland) Lions de Genève	87–78 (N)	87–78
2026–27	Basketball Champions League	Second qualifying round	(Germany) Rasta Vechta	88–98 (N)	88–98
2026–27	FIBA Europe Cup	Group Stage	(Denmark) Bakken Bears	91–81 (A) (H)	
2026–27	FIBA Europe Cup	Group Stage	(Turkey) Denizli Basket	96–91 (H) (A)	
2026–27	FIBA Europe Cup	Group Stage	(Slovakia) BC Prievidza	98–83 (H) (A)	
2026–27	FIBA Europe Cup	Group Stage	(Switzerland) Lions de Genève	(A) (H)	
2026–27	FIBA Europe Cup	Group Stage	(Azerbaijan) BC Prievidza	(H) (A)	

== Home arenas ==
Benfica played its home basketball games at the Pavilhão dos Desportos, from 1946 to 1965. The club then played its home games at the Pavilhão da Luz, from 1965 to 2003. Since 2003, Benfica has hosted its home games at the Pavilhão Fidelidade, which has a seating capacity of 2,400 people.

== Honours ==
Type	Competition	Titles	Seasons
Domestic	Liga Portuguesa de Basquetebol	31	1939–40, 1945–46, 1946–47, 1960–61, 1961–62, 1962–63, 1963–64, 1964–65, 1969–70, 1974–75, 1984–85, 1985–86, 1986–87, 1988–89, 1989–90, 1990–91, 1991–92, 1992–93, 1993–94, 1994–95, 2008–09, 2009–10, 2011–12, 2012–13, 2013–14, 2014–15, 2016–17, 2021–22, 2022–23, 2023–24, 2024–25
Domestic	Campeonato Metropolitano	5	1965–66, 1969–70, 1970–71, 1972–73, 1973–74
Domestic	Taça de Portugal	23	1945–46, 1946–47, 1960–61, 1963–64, 1964–65, 1965–66, 1967–68, 1968–69, 1969–70, 1971–72, 1972–73, 1973–74, 1980–81, 1991–92, 1992–93, 1993–94, 1994–95, 1995–96, 2013–14, 2014–15, 2015–16, 2016–17, 2022–23
Domestic	Taça da Liga / Hugo dos Santos Cup	13	1989–90, 1990–91, 1992–93, 1993–94, 1994–95, 1995–96, 2010–11, 2012–13, 2013–14, 2014–15, 2016–17, 2017–18, 2023–24
Domestic	Supertaça	16	1985, 1989, 1991, 1994, 1995, 1996, 1998, 2009, 2010, 2012, 2013, 2014, 2015, 2017, 2023, 2025
Domestic	Troféu António Pratas LPB	6	2007–08, 2008–09, 2011–12, 2012–13, 2014–15, 2015–16
International	Supertaça da Lusofonia	1^{s}	2010

- record
- ^{s} shared record

=== Doubles ===
- Liga Portuguesa de Basquetebol and Taça de Portugal

13: 1945-46, 1946-47, 1960-61, 1963-64, 1964-65, 1969-70, 1991-92, 1992-93, 1993-94, 1994-95, 2013-14, 2014-15, 2022-23

- Liga Portuguesa de Basquetebol and Taça da Liga

9: 1989-90, 1990-91, 1991-92, 1992-93, 1993-94, 1994-95, 2013-14, 2014-15, 2023-24

- Taça de Portugal and Taça da Liga

6: 1992-93, 1993-94, 1994-95, 1995-96, 2013-14, 2014-15

- Liga Portuguesa de Basquetebol and Supertaça

8: 1985-86, 1989-90, 1991-92, 1994-95, 2009-10, 2013-14, 2014-15, 2023-24

=== Trebles ===
- Liga Portuguesa de Basquetebol, Taça de Portugal and Taça da Liga

5: 1992-93, 1993-94, 1994-95, 2013-14, 2014-15

- Liga Portuguesa de Basquetebol, Taça de Portugal and Supertaça

4: 1991-92, 1994-95, 2013-14, 2014-15

- Liga Portuguesa de Basquetebol, Taça da Liga and Supertaça

6: 1989-90, 1994-95, 2012-13, 2013-14, 2014-15, 2023-24

- Taça de Portugal, Taça da Liga and Supertaça

4: 1994-95, 1995-96, 2013-14, 2014-15

=== Quadruple ===
- Liga Portuguesa de Basquetebol, Taça de Portugal, Taça da Liga, Supertaça

3: 1994-95, 2013-14, 2014-15

== Players ==
=== Current roster ===
S.L. Benfica roster
Players
Coaches

Pos.	No.	Nat.	Name	Ht.	Wt.	Age
PF	00	(United States)	Okeke, Okechukwu	2.06 m (6 ft 9 in)		24 – 2 April 2002
F	0	(Angola)	Francisco, Eduardo	1.98 m (6 ft 6 in)		22 – 5 November 2003
G	1	(United States)	Broussard, Aaron	1.96 m (6 ft 5 in)		36 – 14 April 1990
PG	4	(Portugal)	Andrade, Jhonathan	1.84 m (6 ft 0 in)		20 – 14 July 2006
SG	8	(United States)	Muhammad, Luther	1.91 m (6 ft 3 in)		27 – 17 June 1999
PG	9	(United States)	Crandall, Geno	1.91 m (6 ft 3 in)		30 – 21 October 1996
SF	10	(Portugal)	Silva, Luis	1.93 m (6 ft 4 in)		22 – 29 April 2004
C	11	(Poland)	Dziewa, Aleksander	2.07 m (6 ft 9 in)		28 – 6 November 1997
G	13	(Portugal)	Gameiro, Diogo	1.82 m (6 ft 0 in)		31 – 13 August 1995
C	14	(Portugal)	Relvão, Daniel	2.08 m (6 ft 10 in)		30 – 26 June 1996
G	16	(Portugal)	Sousa, Sergio	1.95 m (6 ft 5 in)		21 – 28 August 2005
SF	33	(United States)	Barrett, Luke	1.97 m (6 ft 6 in)		25 – 25 September 2001
F	34	(United States)	Slater, Brandon	2.03 m (6 ft 8 in)		27 – 14 September 1999

Head coach

- (Latvia) Ainars Bagatskis

Assistant coach(es)

- (Portugal) Nuno Ferreira
- (Portugal) Luís Catarino

Team manager

João Nuno Crespo

Legend

- (C) Team captain
- Injured

- Roster
Updated: 20 September 2026

=== Retired numbers ===
S.L. Benfica retired numbers
No	Nat.	Player	Position	Tenure
5	(Portugal)	Henrique Vieira	PG	1981–1992
7	(Portugal)	Carlos Lisboa	SG/SF	1984–1996

=== Former players ===
Players who won a league title with Benfica or who were picked in the NBA draft.

- (United States) Bruce Holland (4 seasons: 1977–81)
- (Portugal) Henrique Vieira (11 seasons: 1981–92)
- (Portugal) Carlos Lisboa (12 seasons: 1984–96)
- (Portugal) Mike Plowden (10 seasons: 1985–95)
- (Angola) Jean-Jacques Conceição (8 seasons: 1988–96)
- (Portugal) Pedro Miguel (11 seasons: 1989–2000)
- (Angola) José Carlos Guimarães (4 seasons: 1991–94, 1996–97)
- (Portugal) Steve Rocha (4 seasons: 1992–95, 1996–97)
- (Portugal) Carlos Seixas (7 seasons: 1992–99)
- (Norway) Torgeir Bryn (1 season: 1994–95)
- (Portugal) Luís Silva (8 seasons: 1994–99, 2002–05)
- (Portugal) Sérgio Ramos (8 seasons: 1995–99, 2008–12)
- (United States) Brian Rewers (1 season: 1997–98)
- (United States) Mark Acres (1 season: 1997–98)
- (United States) Jamal Faulkner (3 seasons: 1997–99)
- (United States) Jamie Watson (1 season: 2002–03)
- (Spain) Tomás Jofresa (1 season: 2003–04)
- (United States) Ben Davis (1 season: 2005–06)
- (United States) Ashante Johnson (3 seasons: 2005–07)
- (Portugal) Carlos Andrade (7 seasons: 2006–07, 2012–18)
- (United States) Corey Benjamin (1 season: 2006–07)
- (United States) Geno Carlisle (1 season: 2006–07)
- (United States) Tyson Wheeler (1 season: 2006–07)
- (Portugal) Miguel Minhava (7 seasons: 2006–13)
- (Angola) Edson Ferreira (1 season: 2008–09)
- (United States) Rahein Brown (1 season: 2008–09)
- (United States) Seth Doliboa (5 seasons: 2008–09, 2011–2015)
- (Portugal) Cristóvão Cordeiro (2 seasons: 2008–10)
- (Portugal) João Santos (2 seasons: 2008–10)
- (Portugal) Miguel Barroca (2 seasons: 2008–10)
- (Portugal) António Tavares (3 seasons: 2008–11)
- (United States) Ben Reed (4 seasons: 2008–12)
- (Portugal) Diogo Carreira (8 seasons: 2008–16)
- (United States) Nick DeWitz (1 season: 2009–10)
- (United States) Will Frisby (1 season: 2009–10)
- (Portugal) Elvis Évora (4 seasons: 2009–13)
- (United States) Heshimu Evans (4 seasons: 2009–13)
- (Portugal) Carlos Ferreirinho (6 seasons: 2010–16)
- (Angola) António Monteiro (1 season: 2011–12)
- (United States) Marcus Norris (1 season: 2011–12)
- (United States) Ted Scott (1 season: 2011–12)
- (United States) Fred Gentry (5 seasons: 2011–16)
- (United States) Lace Dunn (1 season: 2012–13)
- (United States) Ricky Franklin (1 season: 2012–13)
- (Portugal) Cláudio Fonseca (4 seasons: 2012–16)
- (United States) David Weaver (1 season: 2013–14)
- (Portugal) Artur Castela (2 seasons: 2013–16)
- (United States) Jobey Thomas (3 seasons: 2013–15)
- (Portugal) Mário Gil Fernandes (4 seasons: 2013–17)
- (United States) Ron Slay (1 season: 2014–15)
- (Portugal) Fábio Lima (4 seasons: 2014–15, 2018–21)
- (United States) Daequan Cook (1 season: 2015–16)
- (Portugal) Marko Loncovic (2 seasons: 2015–17)
- (Portugal) Nuno Oliveira (3 seasons: 2015–18)
- (United States) Derek Raivio (1 season: 2016–17)
- (Angola) Carlos Morais (2 seasons: 2016–18)
- (Portugal) Neemias Queta (1 season: 2017–18)
- (United States) Quincy Miller (1 season: 2020–21)
- (Portugal) Rafael Lisboa (5 seasons: 2016–21)
- (United States) Toney Douglas (2 seasons: 2022–24)

== Head coaches ==
- (Portugal) Teotónio Lima (12 seasons: 1956–65, 1972–75)
- (Portugal) José Curado (3 seasons: 1984–87)
- (United States) Tim Shea (3 seasons: 1988–91)
- (Portugal) Mário Palma (6 seasons: 1991–97)
- (Portugal) Mário Gomes (5 seasons: 1999–2004)
- (Portugal) Carlos Lisboa (10 seasons: 1997–99, 2011–17, 2019–21)
- (Portugal) Norberto Alves (2004–06, 2021–present)
- (Portugal) Henrique Vieira (5 seasons: 2007–11)
- (Portugal) José Ricardo (1 season: 2017–18)
- (Spain) Arturo Álvarez (1 season: 2018–19)

== Women's honours ==
Type	Competition	Titles	Seasons
Domestic	Portuguese League	5	2020–21, 2021–22, 2023–24, 2024–25, 2025-26
Domestic	Portuguese Cup	4	2020–21, 2021–22, 2023–24, 2025-26
Domestic	Federation Cup	3	2021–22, 2022–23,
Domestic	Vítor Hugo Cup	4	2019–20, 2022–23, 2023–24, 2024–25
Domestic	Portuguese Super Cup	4	2021, 2022, 2024, 2026
