= Carlos Lisboa =

Portuguese basketball player and coach

Personal information
- Born: 23 July 1958 (age 68) Praia, Portuguese Cape Verde
- Listed height: 1.88 m (6 ft 2 in)

Career information
- Playing career: 1976–1996
- Position: Shooting guard / small forward
- Number: 7
- Coaching career: 1996–present

Career history

Playing
- 1975–1982: Sporting CP
- 1982–1984: C.A. Queluz
- 1984–1996: Benfica

Coaching
- 1996–1997: Estoril Praia
- 1997–1999: Benfica
- 2001–2004: Aveiro Basket
- 2011–2017, 2019–2021: Benfica

Career highlights
- As player: 14× Portuguese League champion (1978, 1981, 1982, 1984–1995); 8× Portuguese Cup winner (1978, 1980, 1983, 1992–1996); 6× Portuguese Supercup winner (1985, 1989, 1991, 1994–1996); 5× Portuguese League Cup winner (1990, 1993–1996); No.7 jersey retired by Benfica; As head coach: 5× Portuguese League champion (2012–2015, 2017); 4× Portuguese Cup winner (2014–2017); 5× Portuguese Supercup winner (1998, 2012–2015); 4× Portuguese League Cup winner (2013–2015, 2017); 4× António Pratas Trophy winner (2011–2012, 2014–2015)

Carlos Humberto Lehman de Almeida Benholiel Lisboa Santos (born 23 July 1958), known as Carlos Lisboa, is a Portuguese former basketball player who played as a guard and forward. He is considered the greatest Portuguese basketball player of all-time. As a head coach, Lisboa most notably led Benfica from 2011 to 2017, winning 22 major titles, and from 2019 to 2021.

== Early life and career ==
Lisboa was born in Praia, Cape Verde, to a Jewish origin metropolitan Portuguese father and to a German origin mother (Fernanda Lisboa Santos). He spent his youth in Mozambique, coming to Portugal in 1974. He started his basketball career in the then Portuguese colony, at the youth levels of Sporting Lourenço Marques. After his coming to Portugal, he played at the youth categories of Sporting CP, entering the first team, still at the youth level. He would be a leading name for Sporting, from 1975 to 1982, where he won three National Championships and two Cups of Portugal. He played at C.A. Queluz for the two following seasons, winning a Championship and a Cup of Portugal.

Lisboa, however, would achieve the greatest success of his long career as a Benfica player, playing there from 1984 to 1996, ending it aged 38 years old. During this period, he went to win ten National Championship titles and five Cups of Portugal, 4 League Cups and 3 Portuguese Super Cup.

Lisboa played 46 times for Portugal, from 1977 to 1992, but he never had the chance to show his talent at a major competition.

After ending his player career, Lisboa became a coach, having coached Estoril Praia, Benfica, and Aveiro Basket.

== Honours ==
=== Player ===
Sporting

- Portuguese League: 1977–78, 1980–81, 1981–82
- Portuguese Cup: 1977–78, 1979–80

Queluz

- Portuguese League: 1983–84
- Portuguese Cup: 1982–83

Benfica

- Portuguese League (10): 1984–85, 1985–86, 1986–87, 1988–89, 1989–90, 1990–91, 1991–92, 1992–93, 1993–94, 1994–95
- Portuguese Cup (5): 1991–92, 1992–93, 1993–94, 1994–95, 1995–96
- Portuguese Super Cup (6): 1985, 1989, 1991, 1994, 1995, 1996
- Portuguese League Cup (5): 1989–90, 1992–93, 1993–94, 1994–95, 1995–96

=== Head coach ===
Benfica

- Portuguese League (5): 2011–12, 2012–13, 2013–14, 2014–15, 2016–17
- Portuguese Cup (4): 2013–14, 2014–15, 2015–16, 2016–17
- Portuguese Super Cup (5): 1998, 2012, 2013, 2014, 2015
- Hugo dos Santos Cup (4): 2012–13, 2013–14, 2014–15, 2016–17
- António Pratas Trophy (4): 2011, 2012, 2014, 2015
