= Eduardo Francisco =

Angolan basketball player

No. 0 – Benfica
- Position: Power forward / Center
- League: Liga Portuguesa de Basquetebol

Personal information
- Born: November 5, 2003 (age 23) Angola
- Listed height: 2.00 m (6 ft 7 in)
- Listed weight: 92 kg (203 lb)

Career information
- Playing career: 2021–present

Career history
- 2021–present: Benfica
Medals
Men's basketball
Representing Angola
AfroBasket
Gold medal – first place	2025 Angola

Eduardo Mingas Francisco (born 5 November 2003) is an Angolan professional basketball player for Benfica of the Liga Portuguesa de Basquetebol and the Angola national team.

== Early life and career ==
Born in Angola on 5 November 2003, Francisco joined Benfica's youth system and featured in the club's under-18 side during the 2019–20 season.

== Professional career ==
Francisco made his senior debut for Benfica in the 2021–22 season while also playing extensively with the club’s B team in Portugal’s Proliga. He averaged 13.0 points and 11.4 rebounds in 19 B team appearances, while also featuring in 16 games with the main squad.

In 2022–23, he increased his role, averaging 16.3 points and 12.4 rebounds across 22 Proliga matches at 33.7 minutes per game. During the 2023–24 campaign, Francisco became a regular part of Benfica’s senior team, helping the club secure a domestic treble before extending his contract through 2026.

== National team career ==
Francisco has represented the Angola men's national basketball team. He was selected for FIBA AfroBasket 2025, hosted in Luanda, Angola.

In the final against Mali, he started for Angola, scoring the opening basket and finishing with nine points, three offensive rebounds and one steal in a 70–43 victory that gave Angola its record 12th continental title.

== Honours and achievements ==
Benfica

- Portuguese League: Champion (2023–24)
- Portuguese Cup: Champion (2023–24)
- Portuguese Supercup: Champion (2023–24)
