= Portuguese Women's Basketball League Cup =

The Portuguese Women's Basketball League Cup (Taça da Liga de Basquetebol Feminino) is a women's basketball competition organized by the Portuguese Basketball Federation.

== Portuguese League Cup winners ==
Season	Final
Season	Winners	Result	Runners-up
2009–10	CAB Madeira	71–62	CJ Boa Viagem
2010–11	CR Quinta dos Lombos	67–64	Mcell Algés
2011–12	CJ Boa Viagem	61–58	AD Vagos
2012–13	CAB Madeira	66–58	CR Quinta dos Lombos
2013–14	CR Quinta dos Lombos	62–49	Olivais FC
2014–15	CAB Madeira	65–55	CR Quinta dos Lombos
2015–16	GD Escola Sec. de Santo André	75–74	CAB Madeira
2016–17
