= Vitória S.C. (basketball) =

Vitória Sport Clube
- Nickname: Vitória de Guimarães
- Leagues: LPB
- Founded: 2004 (22 years ago) (men's); 2005 (21 years ago) (women's)
- Arena: Pavilhão Desportivo Unidade Vimaranense
- Capacity: 2,500
- Location: Guimarães, Portugal
- Team colors
- President: Rui Rodrigues
- Head coach: Miguel Miranda (men's); Marco Ramos (women's)
- Championships: 2 Portuguese Cups; 1 Proliga
- Website: vitoriasc.pt/modalidades-basquetebol/
Home	Away

Vitória Sport Clube is a Portuguese sports club in the city of Guimarães, where different sports are practiced. This article is about its professional basketball section, whose senior men's and women's teams compete respectively in the Portuguese Basketball League, the top level of the sport in Portugal, and in the Second Basketball Division, the third competition in Portugal.

The teams, from youth to senior level, train and play their games in the Vimaranense Unit Sports Pavilion, which is located in the Vitória SC Academy.

== History ==
Vitória's men's basketball team, founded in 2004, came about as a continuation of the project of another club, called "Basquetebol Clube de Guimarães", founded in 1993, with its managers moving to Vitória de Guimarães, namely Pedro Guerreiro and António Lourenço, leading the club to consolidate its position in the LPB, the top level, since 2008/09 and consequently to win several national titles in the seasons that followed.

Women's basketball team was founded a year later for the 2005/06 season, and after 11 years it won its first First Division National Championship title. In the following seasons, already in the elite of women's basketball, Vitória managed to constantly fight for the top spots and play in some cup finals, feats led by teams made up of players from Vitória's training centre.

However, in 2022 Vitória SC announced that it would not register the women's basketball team in the LFB (basketball's elite) as a first step towards the reformulation of the sport's tiers based on the development of young athletes from the academy, leading to the women's team having to start again in the third tier.

== Men's achievements ==
Proliga: 1

- 2006/07

Portuguese Basketball Cup: 2

- 2007/08, 2012/13

António Pratas Trophy: 1

- 2010

Total Trophies: 4 Nationals

== Players ==
=== Current roster ===
Note: Flags indicate national team eligibility at FIBA-sanctioned events. Players may hold other non-FIBA nationalities not displayed.

Vitória SC roster
Players
Coaches

Pos.	No.	Nat.	Name
	2	(United States)	Eric Coleman
	4	(Portugal)	Manuel Magalhães
	6	(Portugal)	Carlos Cardoso
	8	(Portugal)	Hugo Sotta
	9	(Portugal)	André Bessa
	10	(Australia)	Matt McCarthy
	15	(Portugal)	Rui Fernandes
	20	(Mozambique)	Jeremias Manjate
	22	(United States)	DeAngelo Stewart
	27	(United States)	Malcolm Drumwright
	32	(Portugal)	João Nunes
	41	(Portugal)	António Arantes
	-	(United States)	Brandon Austin
	-	(Portugal)	Simão Ribeiro

Head coach

(Portugal) Miguel Miranda

Legend

- (C) Team captain
- Injured

=== Notable players ===
Note: Flags indicate national team eligibility at FIBA-sanctioned events. Players may hold other non-FIBA nationalities not displayed.

Criteria

To appear in this section a player must have either:

- Set a club record or won an individual award while at the club
- Played at least one official international match for their national team at any time
- Played at least one official NBA match at any time.

- (Portugal) José Vilhena
- (Portugal) Miguel Cardoso
- (Cape Verde) (Portugal) Ivan Almeida
- (Cape Verde) (Portugal) Joel Almeida

=== Other notable players ===
- (Angola) Sergio Correia
- (Bosnia and Herzegovina) Nebojsa Pavlovic
- (Brazil) Antonio Neto
- (Brazil) Luis Lima
- (Latvia) Maris Gulbis
- (Serbia) Nikola Tadić
- André Bessa
- (Portugal) Carlos Areias
- (Portugal) Cláudio Fonseca
- (Portugal) João Balseiro
- (Portugal) José Silva
- (Portugal) Litos Cardoso
- (Portugal) Miguel Cardoso
- (Portugal) Paulo Cunha
- (Portugal) Ricardo Monteiro
- (United States) Alex Oriakhi
- (United States) Brandon Brown
- (United States) Kevin Martin
- (United States) Tony Meier
- (United States) Zahir Porter
- (United States) Nolan Richardson
- (United States) Willie Taylor
- (United States) Jake Van Tubbergen
- (United States) (Nigeria) Ije Nwankwo

== Season by season ==
Season	Tier	League	ProLiga	Portuguese Cup	Portuguese Supercup	League Cup	António Pratas Trophy
2004/05	2			4th round			
2005/06	2			1/8 Final			
2006/07	2		Winner	1/8 Final			
2007/08	2		Finalist	Winner			
2008/09	1	6th		1/8 Final	Finalist		
2009/10	1	4th		1/2 Final		1/4 Final	Winner
2010/11	1	4th		1/2 Final		4th round	
2011/12	1	8th		1/8 Final			
2012/13	1	5th		Winner			
2013/14	1	2nd		1/2 Final	Finalist	1/2 Final	
2014/15	1	2nd		1/2 Final		Finalist	
2015/16	1	8th		1/2 Final			
2016/17	1	3rd		1/2 Final		1/4 Final	
2017/18	1	5th		1/8 Final		1/2 Final	
2018/19	1	9th		1/8 Final			
2019/20	1	5th		1/2 Final			
2020/21	1	8th		1/4 Final			
2021/22	1	10th		1/2 Final			
2022/23	1	9th		1/8 Final			
2023/24	1	7th		1/4 Final		Group stage	
2024/25	1	8th		1/4 Final		Group stage	
2025/26	1	9th		1/8 Final		Group stage	

== Women's achievements ==
National Champions of the 1st Division: 1

- 2016/17

Vice Champions of the Portuguese Cup

- 2018/19, 2020/21

Total Trophies: 1 Nationals
