= C.A. Queluz =

Basketball team from Queluz, Portugal

Clube Atlético de Queluz
- Nickname: CA Queluz
- Leagues: Liga Portuguesa de Basquetebol
- Founded: 5 June 1933 (92 years ago)
- Arena: Pavilhão Henrique Miranda
- Location: Queluz, Portugal
- Team colors: Black, White
- President: João Machado
- Championships: 2 Portuguese Leagues; 2 Portuguese Cups; 2 Portuguese Super Cups; 1 Proliga
- Website: www.caqueluz.pt

Clube Atlético de Queluz is a professional basketball team based in Queluz, Portugal. The team plays in the Liga Portuguesa de Basquetebol.

== History ==
In the 2005–06 season, Queluz participated in the ULEB Cup after winning the league the previous season.

The club played in the LCB (currently LPB) until 2008/09, after which it withdrew from the sport's competitions. It only returned to national competition in 2018/19.

In 2023–24, the club gained promotion to the Liga Betclic Masculina, the top division of Portuguese basketball, after a strong campaign that led to the Proliga title.

== Achievements ==
- Portuguese Basketball League: 2

1983–84, 2004–05

- Portuguese Basketball Cup: 2

1982–83, 2004–05

- Portuguese Basketball Super Cup: 2

1984, 2005

- Proliga: 1

2023–24

== Notable players ==
Note: Flags indicate national team eligibility at FIBA-sanctioned events. Players may hold other non-FIBA nationalities not displayed.

Criteria

To appear in this section a player must have either:

- Set a club record or won an individual award while at the club
- Played at least one official international match for their national team at any time
- Played at least one official NBA match at any time.

- (Angola) Ângelo Victoriano
- (Angola) Aníbal Moreira
- (Nigeria) Ike Nwankwo
- (Portugal) Carlos Andrade
- (Portugal) Miguel Miranda
- (Portugal) Carlos Lisboa
