= 2014–15 EuroChallenge Group E =

Basketball tournament group stage

Group E of the 2014–15 EuroChallenge consisted of Joensuun Kataja, Belfius Mons-Hainaut, JSF Nanterre and Benfica. Play began on 4 November and ended on 16 December 2014.

== Teams ==
Draw seed	Team	City	Country	Last appearance	2013–14			Arena	Capacity
Draw seed	Team	City	Country	Last appearance	League	Pos.	Playoffs	Arena	Capacity
I	Joensuun Kataja	Joensuu	Finland	2013–14	Korisliiga	3rd	RU	Joensuu Areena	2,500
II	Belfius Mons-Hainaut	Mons	Belgium	2012–13	Ethias League	2nd	SF	Mons Arena	4,000
III	JSF Nanterre	Nanterre	France	—N/a	LNB Pro A	10th	—N/a	Palais des Sports	3,000
IV	Benfica	Lisbon	Portugal	2010–11	LPB	1st	C	Pavilhão Fidelidade	2,400

== Standings ==
Pos	Team	Pld	W	L	PF	PA	PD	Pts	NAN	BEL	SLB	KAT
1	(France) JSF Nanterre (Q)	6	5	1	529	478	+51	11 (Note: Head-to-head: 1–1 (+12))		88–68	80–68	102–92
2	(Belgium) Belfius Mons-Hainaut (Q)	6	5	1	489	451	+38	11 (Note: Head-to-head: 1–1 (–12))	94–86		92–63	71–62
3	(Portugal) Benfica	6	2	4	486	519	−33	8	86–96	69–79		107–82
4	(Finland) Kataja	6	0	6	479	535	−56	6	70–77	83–85	90–93	

(Q) Qualify for Top 16
