= Portuguese Basketball Federation =

Governing body for basketball in Portugal

- Formation: 17 August 1927; 98 years ago
- Type: Basketball Federation
- Headquarters: Rua da Madalena, 179 - 2º 1149-033 Lisbon
- Location: Portugal
- Members: FIBA (since 1932); FIBA Europe (since 1957)
- Official language: Portuguese
- President: Manuel Tavares (since 2014)
- Budget: 6,576,634€
- Website: www.fpb.pt

The Portuguese Basketball Federation (Portuguese: Federação Portuguesa de Basquetebol) is the governing body for basketball in Portugal. Established on 17 August 1927, it became one of the eight founding national member federations of FIBA in 1932.
