= Illiabum Clube =

Professional basketball team in Ílhavo, Portugal

Illiabum
- Leagues: LPB
- Arena: Capitão Adriano Nordeste
- Location: Ílhavo, Portugal

Illiabum Clube is a professional basketball team based in Ílhavo, Portugal. They play in the Portuguese Basketball League (LCB)

== Domestic competitions ==
- Proliga

Winners (2): 2008–09, 2015–16

- Portuguese Cup

Winners (1): 2017–18

- Portuguese SuperCup

Winners (1): 1992

- Troféu António Pratas Proliga

Winners (3): 2008–09, 2011–12, 2015–16

== Notable players ==
Note: Flags indicate national team eligibility at FIBA-sanctioned events. Players may hold other non-FIBA nationalities not displayed.

Criteria

To appear in this section a player must have either:

- Set a club record or won an individual award while at the club
- Played at least one official international match for their national team at any time
- Played at least one official NBA match at any time.

- (Portugal) Miguel Queiroz
