= Proliga (Portugal) =

Portuguese basketball league

- Sport: Basketball
- First season: 2003
- No. of teams: 16
- Country: Portugal
- Level on pyramid: 2
- Promotion to: LPB

The Proliga is a basketball league in Portugal organised by the Portuguese Basketball Federation (FPB). It is the second-tier basketball league in Portugal after the Portuguese Basketball League (LPB). The league was created in 2003.

== Proliga Champions ==
Year	Final
Year	Champion	Score	Runner-Up
2003–04	Sampaense	3–0 (?–?, ?–?, 87–67)	Sangalhos
2004–05	Sampaense	3–1 (79–76, 62–66, 83–75, 80–66)	Basket Almada
2005–06	Sampaense	3–1 (76–65, 86–76, 70–90, 83–74)	Esgueira
2006–07	Vitória de Guimarães	3–0 (79–70, 84–73, 83–78)	Sampaense
2007–08	Física	3–1 (93–88, 81–85, 96–79, 79–65)	Vitória de Guimarães
2008–09	Illiabum	3–1 (92–85, 82–72, 66–68, 95–79)	Sampaense
2009–10	Lusitânia	3–2 (78–72, 59–79, 65–83, 89–74, 81–76)	CB Penafiel
2010–11	Terceira Basket	3–2 (59–67, 64–77, 89–70, 86–77, 68–61)	Barcelos
2011–12	Algés	3–0 (83–73, 79–77, 81–68)	Física
2012–13	Oliveirense	3–1 (67–66, 72–81, 83–65, 76–61)	Maia Basket
2013–14	Dragon Force	2–0 (69–66, 73–72)	Illiabum
2014–15	Dragon Force	3–0 (92–55, 103–76, 77–70)	Eléctrico
2015–16	Illiabum	2–1 (80–82, 100–55, 86–77)	Atlético CP
2016–17	Terceira Basket	2–0 (63–56, 60–56)	Barreirense
2017–18	Imortal	2–1 (84–62, 79–84, 71–57)	Esgueira
2018–19	Barreirense	2–0 (71–69, 69–68)	Maia Basket
2019–20	Competition cancelled due to COVID-19 pandemic
2020–21	CD Póvoa/Monteriano	1–0 (65–59)	Illiabum
2021–22	Esgueira	2–0 (62–60, 65–60)	Galomar
2022–23	Galomar	2–0 (75–66, 101–71)	Portimonense
2023–24	C.A. Queluz	2–0 (96–90, 81–75)	Galitos F.C.
2024–25	Vasco de Gama	2–1 (89–76, 66–78, 100–79)	CB de Queluz
2025–26	CD Póvoa	2–1 (72–90, 78–61, 90–72)	CAB Madeira

== Teams ==
Team	City	Venue
Academica	Coimbra	Pavilhão da Coimbra
Barreirense	Barreiro	Pavilhão Municipal Prof Luís de Carvalho
Braga	Braga	Complexo Desportivo da Rodovia
CAB Madeira	Funchal	Pavilhao do C.A.B.
CB de Queluz	Queluz	
Galitos	Aveiro	Pavilhão do Clube dos Galitos
Galitos F.C.	Barreiro	Pavilhão Municipal Prof Luís de Carvalho
Ginásio Clube Olhanense	Olhão	Pavilhão do Ginásio Clube Olhanense
Illiabum	Ilhavo	Pavilhão Adriano Nordeste
Imortal B	Albufeira	Pavihão de Albufeira Municipal
Maia	Maia	Pavilhão Nortecoope
PSA Santo Andre	Santo Andre	Pavilhão Municipal Prof Luís de Carvalho
Sampaense Basket	São Paio de Gramaços	Pavilhão Serafim Marques
Sangalhos DC	Sangalhos	Complexo Desportivo de Sangalhos
SL Benfica B	Lisbon	Pavilhão Fidelidade
Vasco da Gama	Porto	Parque das Camelias

== Total championships ==
Team	Winner	Runner-up	Years won	Years runner-up
Sampaense	3	2	2004, 2005, 2006	2007, 2009
Illiabum	2	2	2009, 2016	2014, 2020
Dragon Force	2	0	2014, 2015	–
Terceira Basket	2	0	2011, 2017	–
CD Póvoa	2	0	2020, 2026	–
Esgueira	1	2	2022	2006, 2018
Vitória de Guimarães	1	1	2007	2008
Galomar	1	1	2023	2022
Física	1	1	2008	2012
Barreirense	1	1	2019	2017
Lusitânia	1	0	2010	–
Algés	1	0	2012	–
Oliveirense	1	0	2013	–
Imortal	1	0	2018	–
C.A. Queluz	1	0	2024	–
Vasco da Gama	1	0	2025	–
Maia Basket	0	2	–	2013, 2019
Portimonense	0	1	-	2023
Sangalhos	0	1	–	2004
Basket Almada	0	1	–	2005
CB Penafiel	0	1	–	2010
Barcelos	0	1	–	2011
Eléctrico	0	1	–	2015
Atlético CP	0	1	–	2016
Galitos F.C.	0	1	–	2024
CB de Queluz	0	1	–	2025
CAB Madeira	0	1	–	2026
