= Maia Basket Clube =

Portugal-based Basketball Team

Maia Basket Clube is a professional basketball team based in Maia, Portugal.

The club was founded in the 1997–98 season, by Dr. Vieira de Carvalho in order to bring a basketball team to the city of Maia.

== Notable players ==
- (Portugal) Nuno Marçal
