= Galitos F.C. =

Basketball team in Barreiro, Portugal

Galitos Barreiro
- Leagues: LPB
- Arena: Pavilhão Luís Carvalho
- Location: Barreiro, Portugal
Home

Galitos Futebol Clube is a basketball team based in Barreiro, Portugal, that currently plays in the LPB.

== History ==
The club played for the first time to the Portuguese first league in 2012.

== Achievements ==
- Portuguese Basketball Cup:
  - Runner-up: 2013–14
- Portuguese Basketball Super Cup:
  - Runner-up: 2014
- Proliga:
  - Runner-up: 2023–24
