= CAB Madeira =

Professional basketball team in Madeira, Portugal

- Leagues: (M) LPB (W) LFB
- Founded: 30 November 1979
- History: CAB Madeira; 1986–present
- Arena: Pavilhão do CAB
- Capacity: 680
- Location: Funchal, Portugal
- Team colors
- President: Francisco Fernandes
- Head coach: (M) Mário Fernandes (W) Fátima Silva
- Championships: Women – 6 (1997, 1999, 2001, 2003, 2005, 2006)
- Website: www.cab-madeira.com
Home

Clube Amigos do Basquete, also known as CAB Madeira, is a professional basketball team based in Funchal, Madeira, Portugal. They are comprised by men and women departments, both play in their respective highest Portuguese division.

== Honours ==
According to information available in official sources.

=== Men ===
- Portuguese Cup (1): 2010–11
- Portuguese League Cup (1): 2004–05

Youth

- U18 National Cup (2): 1999–2000, 2005–06

=== Women ===
- Portuguese League (6): 1996–97, 1998–99, 2000–01, 2002–03, 2004–05, 2005–06
- Portuguese Cup (7): 1995–96, 1998–99, 1999–2000, 2005–06, 2006–07, 2013–14, 2014–15
- Portuguese League Cup (3): 2009–10, 2012–13, 2014–15
- Vitor Hugo Cup (3): 2007–08, 2008–09, 2016–17
- Portuguese Super Cup (7): 1995–96, 1996–97, 1999–2000, 2003–04, 2006–07, 2007–08, 2014–15

Youth

- U16 Portuguese League (2): 2004–05, 2005–06
- U14 Portuguese League (3): 2005–06, 2011–12, 2016–17
- U19 National Cup (4): 1997–98, 1998–99, 2003–04, 2005–06
- U16 National Cup (4): 1997–98, 2001–02, 2003–04, 2015–16

== Notable players ==
- (Serbia) Milos Babic (2001–02)
- (Serbia) Branko Djipalo (2006–08)
- (United States) Nate Johnston (2003–04)
- (Puerto Rico) Bobby Joe Hatton (2004–05)
- (Slovenia) Walter Jeklin (2005–06)
- (Portugal) Diogo Gameiro (2016–21)
