= S.C. Lusitânia (basketball) =

Basketball division of SC Lusitânia

S.C. Lusitânia EXPERT
- Leagues: LPB
- Arena: Pavilhão Municipal de Angra do Heroísmo
- Location: Angra do Heroísmo, Portugal
- Team colors: Green, White
- Team manager: Ricardo Guimarães
- Head coach: Heleder Albergaria
- Championships: 1 Portuguese League Cup; 1 Proliga
Home	Away

S.C. Lusitânia EXPERT (Note: Part of the name due to sponsorship reasons.) is a professional basketball team based in Angra do Heroísmo, Azores, Portugal. They play in the Liga Portuguesa de Basquetebol (LPB). It's the highest ranked team from the Azores in Portuguese basketball.

== Achievements ==
- Portuguese League Cup: 1

2006–07

- Portuguese Proliga: 1

2009–10
