= Pavilhão Fidelidade =

Indoor arena in Lisbon, Portugal

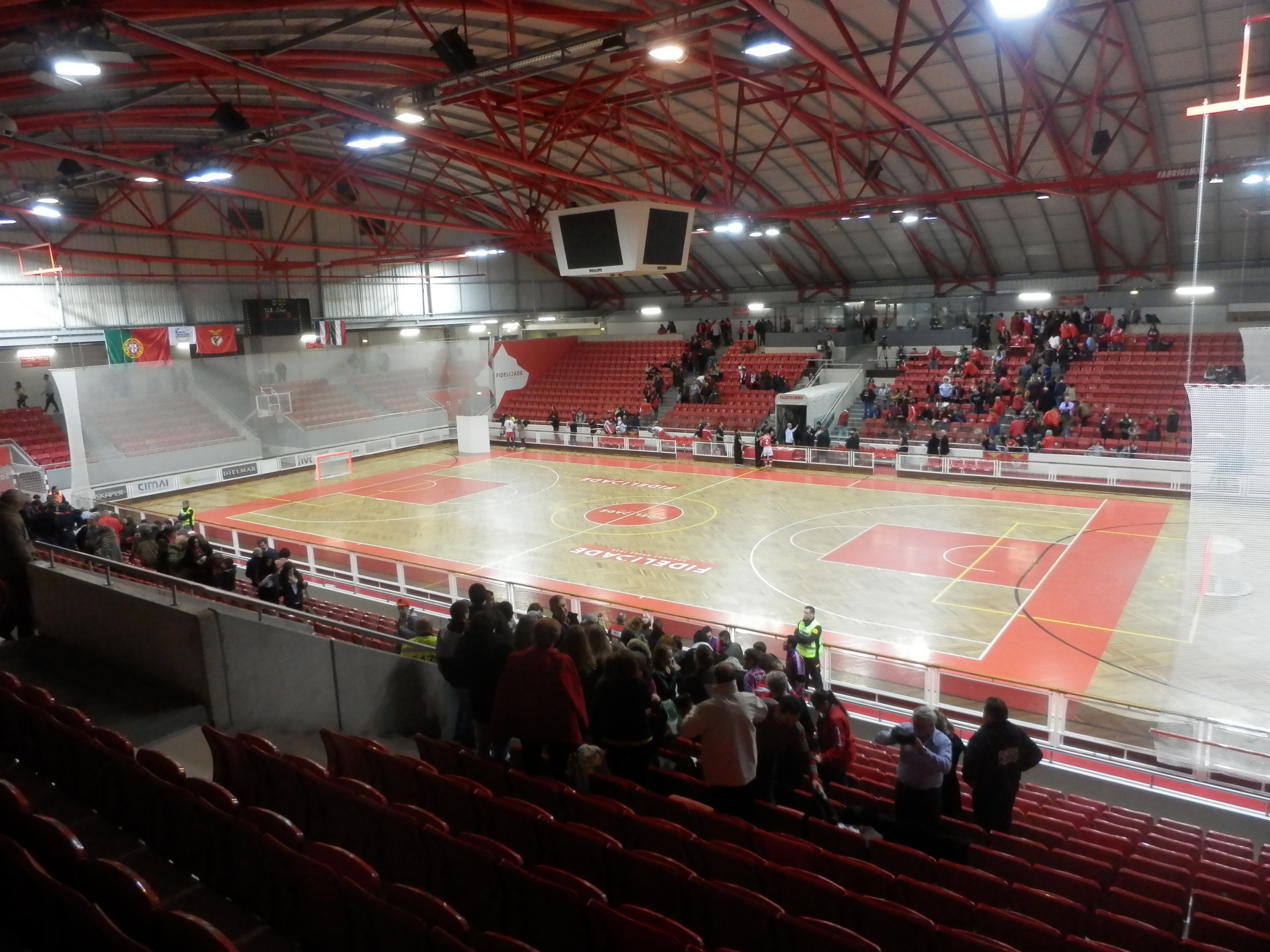
- Interactive map of Pavilhão Fidelidade
- Full name: Pavilhão da Luz Nº 1
- Former names: Pavilhão Açoreana Seguros (2003–08); Pavilhão Império Bonança (2008–13)
- Address: Av. Eusébio da Silva Ferreira, 1500-313
- Location: Lisbon, Portugal
- Coordinates: 38.751259°N 9.183613°W
- Owner: S.L. Benfica
- Capacity: 2,456
- Public transit: Azul at Alto dos Moinhos; Azul at Colégio Militar/Luz

Construction
- Built: March 2002 – February 2004
- Opened: 28 February 2004
- Architect: Damon Lavelle

Tenants
- Basketball; Futsal; Roller Hockey

Website
- slbenfica.pt

The Pavilhão da Luz Nº 1, currently known as Pavilhão Fidelidade for sponsorship reasons, is the main arena (or pavilion) of Portuguese multi-sport club S.L. Benfica. It has a full capacity of 2,456 seats and is mainly used by the basketball, futsal and roller hockey departments of the club.

Built at the same time as the new Estádio da Luz, it was designed from the start to replace the 37-year old Pavilhão da Luz, which was torn down in March 2003. Opened on 28 February 2004, during the celebrations of the club centenary, its first game opposed the basketball section against Ovarense. Its features include an NBA-style scoreboard, and other standard amenities like safety nets behind the goals, press boxes, five locker rooms, bars, medical offices and accommodation to handicapped fans.

== Naming rights ==
Eight months after its opening, Benfica sold the arena naming rights to Açoreana Seguros for a fee rumoured to be close to €1 million. It is currently named after Fidelidade, a Portuguese insurance company.

== See also ==
- Pavilhão da Luz Nº 2
