= Tomás Barroso =

Portuguese basketball player (born 1990)

Personal information
- Born: 2 November 1990 (age 36) Albufeira, Faro, Portugal
- Listed height: 6 ft 1 in (1.85 m)
- Listed weight: 193 lb (88 kg)

Career information
- Playing career: 2010–2023
- Position: Point guard

Career history
- 1999–2004: Basquete de Albufeira
- 2004–2006: Imortal DC
- 2006–2008: Espacio Torrelodones
- 2008–2023: Benfica
- 2010–2011: → Ginásio (loan)

Career highlights
- 7× Portuguese League champion (2012–2015, 2017, 2022, 2023); 5× Portuguese Cup winner (2014–2017, 2023); 5× Portuguese League Cup winner (2013–2015, 2017, 2018); 4× António Pratas Trophy champion (2011, 2013, 2015, 2016); 6× Portuguese Supercup champion (2011–2015, 2017)

Tomás Cabrita dos Santos Nunes Barroso (born 2 November 1990) is a former Portuguese basketball player for Benfica and the Portugal national team.

== Career ==
Born in Albufeira, Barroso developed his basketball skills from a young age, playing for his hometown club, Basquete de Albufeira. After five seasons, he moved to their cross-city rival, Imortal DC, but spent only two seasons there, before scouts took notice of him and took him to Spain.

At 16 years of age, Barroso moved alone to Torrelodones, a small town, 24 kilometers (15 mi) from Madrid, competing for Espacio Torrelodones in the Liga EBA, plus on the Regional Under-18 Championship where they eliminated on the knockout stages by Real Madrid.

However, he sustained a knee injury that required surgery, so he opted to return to Portugal; he joined Benfica, who had approached him as he finished his recovery.

Barroso started his professional career in 2010, and given the choice to stay at Benfica, being loaned out to Spain or to Ginásio da Figueira, he chose the latter, and joined them shortly after the FIBA Europe Under-20 Championship. A year later, he returned to Benfica, and helped the Reds won four league titles in a row, plus more than ten other cups, also debuting in European competitions, in the 2014–15 EuroChallenge. For the 2015–16 season, he replaced Diogo Carreira as team captain.

== Honours ==
Benfica

- Portuguese League: 2011–12, 2012–13, 2013–14, 2014–15, 2016–17, 2021–22, 2022–23
- Portuguese Cup: 2013–14, 2014–15, 2015–16, 2016–17, 2022–23
- League Cup: 2012–13, 2013–14, 2014–15, 2016–17, 2017–18
- Portuguese Supercup: 2011, 2012, 2013, 2014, 2015, 2017
- António Pratas Trophy: 2012, 2013, 2014, 2016
