= 2011 Supertaça Compal squads =

2011 Supertaça Compal Squads

This article displays the rosters for the participating teams at the 2011 Supertaça Compal.

== (Portugal) Benfica ==
SL Benfica – 2011 Supertaça Compal – 4th place roster
Players							Coaches
Pos	#	Nat	Name	Height	Weight	Age	Head Coach
G		(Portugal)	António Tavares	1.83 m (6 ft 0 in)		10 December 1975 (aged 35)	(Portugal) Henrique Vieira
G		(United States)	Ben Reed	1.91 m (6 ft 3 in)		18 April 1983 (aged 27)
F		(Portugal)	Carlos Ferreirinho	2.00 m (6 ft 6 1/2 in)		31 December 1991 (aged 19)	Assistant coach(es)
G		(Portugal)	Diogo Carreira	1.80 m (5 ft 11 in)		2 December 1978 (aged 32)
F		(Portugal)	Eki Viana	2.03 m (6 ft 8 in)		7 October 1977 (aged 33)
C		(Portugal)	Elvis Évora	2.05 m (6 ft 8 1/2 in)		4 February 1978 (aged 33)
C		(United States)	Greg Jenkins	2.06 m (6 ft 9 in)		18 March 1982 (aged 28)
F		(United States)	Heshimu Evans	1.98 m (6 ft 6 in)		8 May 1975 (aged 35)
F		(Portugal)	Mike Williams	2.03 m (6 ft 8 in)		3 December 1981 (aged 29)
G		(Portugal)	Miguel Minhava	1.95 m (6 ft 5 in)		5 November 1983 (aged 27)
F		(Cape Verde)	Rodrigo Mascarenhas	1.98 m (6 ft 6 in)		24 March 1980 (aged 30)
F		(Portugal)	Sérgio Ramos	2.00 m (6 ft 6 1/2 in)		11 December 1975 (aged 35)

== (Portugal) FC do Porto ==
FC do Porto – 2011 Supertaça Compal – Bronze Medal roster
Players							Coaches
Pos	#	Nat	Name	Height	Weight	Age	Head Coach
F		(Portugal) (Cape Verde)	Carlos Andrade	1.97 m (6 ft 5 1/2 in)		27 April 1978 (aged 32)	(Spain) Moncho López
F		(Portugal)	David Gomes	2.00 m (6 ft 6 1/2 in)		23 March 1986 (aged 24)
G		(Portugal)	Diogo Correia	1.85 m (6 ft 1 in)		28 October 1990 (aged 20)
F		(United States)	Greg Stempin	2.03 m (6 ft 8 in)		10 May 1979 (aged 31)
C		(Portugal)	João Santos	2.04 m (6 ft 8 1/2 in)		15 June 1979 (aged 31)
F		(Portugal)	João Soares	2.00 m (6 ft 6 1/2 in)		27 March 1990 (aged 20)
G		(Portugal)	José Costa	1.90 m (6 ft 3 in)		8 December 1973 (aged 37)
C		(United States)	Julian Terrell	2.06 m (6 ft 9 in)		16 April 1984 (aged 26)
C		(Portugal)	Miguel Miranda	2.05 m (6 ft 8 1/2 in)		9 October 1978 (aged 32)
C		(Portugal)	Nuno Marçal	2.05 m (6 ft 8 1/2 in)		14 November 1975 (aged 36)
G			Pedro Catarino	1.84 m (6 ft 1/2 in)		20 October 1990 (aged 20)
G		(Nigeria)	Sean Ogirri	1.88 m (6 ft 2 in)		21 February 1986 (aged 24)

== (Angola) Primeiro de Agosto ==
Primeiro de Agosto – 2011 Supertaça Compal – Gold Medal roster
Players							Coaches
Pos	#	Nat	Name	Height	Weight	Age	Head Coach
PG		(Angola)	Hermenegildo Santos	1.80 m (5 ft 11 in)		16 August 1990 (aged 20)	(Portugal) Luís Magalhães
PG		(Angola)	Armando Costa	1.92 m (6 ft 3 1/2 in)	91 kg (201 lb)	3 June 1983 (aged 27)
PG		(Angola)	Adilson Baza	1.85 m (6 ft 1 in)		25 April 1986 (aged 24)	Assistant coach(es)
		(Angola)	Adolfo Quimbamba	1.97 m (6 ft 5 1/2 in)	104 kg (229 lb)	26 December 1982 (aged 28)
C		(Angola)	Felizardo Ambrósio	2.02 m (6 ft 7 1/2 in)	97 kg (214 lb)	25 December 1987 (aged 23)
		(Angola)	Filipe Abraão	1.94 m (6 ft 4 1/2 in)	88 kg (194 lb)	31 December 1979 (aged 31)
		(Angola)	Hélder Ortet			2 November 1982 (aged 28)
C		(Angola)	Joaquim Gomes	2.00 m (6 ft 6 1/2 in)	100 kg (220 lb)	23 December 1980 (aged 30)
SG		(United States)	Karlton Mims	1.89 m (6 ft 2 1/2 in)	87 kg (192 lb)	17 September 1980 (aged 30)
F		(Angola)	Carlos Almeida	1.93 m (6 ft 4 in)	91 kg (201 lb)	1 January 19 (aged 1992)
PG		(Angola)	Miguel Lutonda	1.86 m (6 ft 1 in)	78 kg (172 lb)	24 September 1976 (aged 34)
SF		(Cape Verde)	Mário Correia	1.89 m (6 ft 2 1/2 in)		17 March 1978 (aged 32)
PF		(Angola)	Vladimir Ricardino	1.98 m (6 ft 6 in)	93 kg (205 lb)	4 October 1978 (aged 32)

== (Angola) Recreativo do Libolo ==
Recreativo do Libolo – 2011 Supertaça Compal – Silver Medal roster
Players							Coaches
Pos	#	Nat	Name	Height	Weight	Age	Head Coach
F		(Angola)	Olímpio Cipriano	1.94 m (6 ft 4 1/2 in)	93 kg (205 lb)	9 April 1982 (aged 28)	(Angola) Raúl Duarte
G		(Angola)	Francisco Sousa	1.84 m (6 ft 1/2 in)		30 May 1982 (aged 28)	Assistant coach(es)
F		(Angola)	Edson Ndoniema	1.94 m (6 ft 4 1/2 in)		11 February 1991 (aged 20)	(Angola) Ricardo Rodrigues
G		(Angola)	Mayzer Alexandre	1.84 m (6 ft 1/2 in)		29 June 1984 (aged 26)
PF		(Angola)	Vladimir Ricardino	1.98 m (6 ft 6 in)	93 kg (205 lb)	4 October 1978 (aged 32)
C		(Angola)	Abdel Gomes	2.03 m (6 ft 8 in)		21 May 1989 (aged 21)
C		(Angola) (Chad)	Abdel Bouckar	2.02 m (6 ft 7 1/2 in)	109 kg (240 lb)	8 April 1980 (aged 30)
		(Angola)	Feliciano Camacho			24 December 1981 (aged 29)
		(Angola)	Manuel Mariano			7 July 1987 (aged 23)
PG		(Angola)	Mílton Barros	1.83 m (6 ft 0 in)	75 kg (165 lb)	21 June 1984 (aged 26)
PF		(Angola) (United States)	Reggie Moore	1.98 m (6 ft 6 in)	107 kg (236 lb)	31 March 1981 (aged 29)
