= 2010 Supertaça Compal squads =

Squads of the participating teams at the 2010 Supertaça Compal:

== SL Benfica - (1) ==
Head coach: (Portugal) Henrique Vieira

#	Name	Pos	H	Age
	(Portugal) António Tavares			
	(United States) Ben Reed			
	(Portugal) Cristóvão Cordeiro			
	(Portugal) Diogo Carreira			
	(Portugal) Ecky Viana			
	(Portugal) Elvis Évora			
	(United States) Heshimu Evans			
	(Portugal) João Santos			
	(Portugal) Miguel Barroca			
	(Portugal) Miguel Minhava			
	(Portugal) Sérgio Ramos			
	(United States) Will Frisby			

== Primeiro de Agosto - (2) ==
Head coach: (Portugal) Luís Magalhães

#	Name	Pos	H	Age
	(Angola) Adilson Baza			
	(Angola) Adolfo Quimbamba			
	(Angola) Armando Costa			
	(Angola) Carlos Almeida			
	(Angola) Filipe Abraão			
	(Angola) Felizardo Ambrósio			
	(Portugal) Francisco Jordão			
	(Angola) Hermenegildo Santos			
	(Angola) Kikas			
	(Cape Verde) Mário Correia			
	(Angola) Miguel Lutonda			
	(Angola) Ricardino			

== Petro Atlético - (3) ==
Head coach: (Portugal) Alberto Babo

#	Name	Pos	H	Age
	(Angola) Afonso Rodrigues			
	(United States) Curtis Terry			
	(Angola) Eduardo Mingas			
	(Angola) Fernando Albano			
	(Angola) Francisco Horácio			
	(Angola) Hermenegildo Mbunga			
	(Angola) Idelfonso Kiteculo			
	(United States) Mario Porter			
	(Angola) Miguel Kiala			
	(Angola) Paulo Santana			
	(Angola) Roberto Fortes			
	(Angola) Vladimir Pontes			

== Ovarense - (4) ==
Head coach: (Portugal) Mário Leite

#	Name	Pos	H	Age
	(Portugal) André Pinto			
	(Portugal) Cris Lee			
	(Portugal) Humberto Oliveira			
	(United States) John Waller			
	(Portugal) José Barbosa			
	(Portugal) Miguel Costa			
	(Portugal) Miguel Rodrigues			
	(Portugal) Nelson Costa			
	(Portugal) Nuno Avares			
	(Portugal) Nuno Morais			
	(Portugal) Pedro Azevedo			
