= 2013–14 LPB season =

- League: LPB
- Sport: Basketball
- Duration: October 27, 2013 – May 23, 2014
- Number of games: 20
- Number of teams: 11

Regular season
- Top seed: Benfica
- Top scorer: (United States) Ricky Franklin – 21.7 (CAB Madeira)

Finals
- Champions: Benfica; 25th title
- Runners-up: Vitória S.C.

LPB seasons
- ← 2012–13 2014–15 →

The 2013–14 Liga Portuguesa de Basquetebol (LPB) season was the 81 season of the highest professional basketball league in Portugal. Benfica won their 25th league title, while Vitória S.C. were runners-up.

== Standings ==
Pos	Team	GP	W	L	Qualification
1	Benfica	20	19	1	Playoffs
2	Vitória S.C.	20	13	7	Playoffs
3	CAB Madeira	20	11	9	Playoffs
4	Sampaense	20	10	10	Playoffs
5	Alges	20	10	10	Playoffs
6	Lusitânia EXPERT	20	9	11	Playoffs
7	Ovarense	20	9	11	Playoffs
8	Barcelos	20	8	12	Playoffs
9	Oliveirense	20	7	13	
10	Galitos-Tley	20	7	13	
11	Maia Basket	20	6	14	

== Playoffs ==
Quarterfinals
1	Benfica	3
8	Barcelos	0
4	Sampaense	3
5	Alges	1
2	Vitória S.C.	3
7	Ovarense	1
3	CAB Madeira	0
6	Lusitânia EXPERT	3

Semifinals
1	Benfica	3
4	Sampaense	1
2	Vitória S.C.	3
6	Lusitânia EXPERT	2

Finals
1	Benfica	3
2	Vitória S.C.	0

== Statistical leaders ==
=== Points ===
Pos.	Nat.	Name	Team	PPG
1	(United States)	Ricky Franklin	CAB Madeira	21.7
2	(United States)	Jaime Smith	Lusitânia	21.1
3	(United States)	Chris Dowe	Sampaense	19.9

=== Rebounds ===
Pos.	Nat.	Name	Team	RPG
1	(United States)	Aaron Anderson	CAB Madeira	12.4
2	(United States)	Marcel Momplaisir	Lusitânia	11.0
3	(Portugal)	Nuno Marçal	Sampaense	9.7

=== Assists ===
Pos.	Nat.	Name	Team	APG
1	(Portugal)	Pedro Pinto	Vitória S.C.	7.9
2	(United States)	Ricky Franklin	CAB Madeira	7.1
3	(Portugal)	Miguel Minhava	Galitos-Tley	6.9
