= 2012 Supertaça Compal squads =

2012 Supertaça Compal Squads

This article displays the rosters for the participating teams at the 2012 Supertaça Compal.

== (Portugal) CAB Madeira ==
CAB Madeira – 2012 Supertaça Compal – 5th place roster
Players							Coaches
Pos	#	Nat	Name	Height	Weight	Age	Head Coach
G		(United States)	Austin Kenon	1.80 m (5 ft 11 in)		1 January 1988 (aged 24)	(Portugal) João Freitas
F		(Brazil)	Bruno Cavalcante	2.00 m (6 ft 6 1/2 in)		1 January 1991 (aged 21)
F		(United States)	Barry Shetzer	1.95 m (6 ft 5 in)	91 kg (201 lb)	1 January 1989 (aged 23)	Assistant coach(es)
G		(Portugal)	José Bettencourt	1.83 m (6 ft 0 in)		21 October 1994 (aged 17)
F		(Portugal)	Fábio Lima	1.96 m (6 ft 5 in)		18 August 1988 (aged 23)
G		(Portugal)	Jaime Silva	1.87 m (6 ft 1 1/2 in)		4 June 1980 (aged 31)
C		(United States)	Jarvis Gunter	2.08 m (6 ft 10 in)		8 April 1985 (aged 26)
C		(Portugal)	João Ferreirinho	2.04 m (6 ft 8 1/2 in)		11 August 1988 (aged 23)
F		(Portugal)	Jorge Coelho	1.98 m (6 ft 6 in)		18 October 1978 (aged 33)
G		(Portugal)	José Correia	1.82 m (5 ft 11 1/2 in)		1 January 1989 (aged 23)
C		(United States)	Shawn Jackson	2.05 m (6 ft 8 1/2 in)		9 November 1971 (aged 40)

== (Portugal) FC do Porto ==
FC do Porto – 2012 Supertaça Compal – Silver Medal roster
Players							Coaches
Pos	#	Nat	Name	Height	Weight	Age	Head Coach
F		(Portugal)	André Boavida	1.98 m (6 ft 6 in)		9 February 1988 (aged 24)	(Spain) Moncho López
F		(Portugal) (Cape Verde)	Carlos Andrade	1.97 m (6 ft 5 1/2 in)		27 April 1978 (aged 33)
F		(Portugal)	David Gomes	2.00 m (6 ft 6 1/2 in)		23 March 1986 (aged 25)	Assistant coach(es)
G		(Portugal)	Diogo Correia	1.85 m (6 ft 1 in)		28 October 1990 (aged 21)
F		(United States)	Greg Stempin	2.03 m (6 ft 8 in)		10 May 1979 (aged 32)
C		(Portugal)	João Santos	2.04 m (6 ft 8 1/2 in)		15 June 1979 (aged 32)
F		(Portugal)	João Soares	2.00 m (6 ft 6 1/2 in)		27 March 1990 (aged 21)
G		(Portugal)	José Costa	1.90 m (6 ft 3 in)		8 December 1973 (aged 38)
G		(Portugal)	Miguel Cardoso	1.88 m (6 ft 2 in)		15 January 1993 (aged 19)
C		(Portugal)	Miguel Miranda	2.05 m (6 ft 8 1/2 in)		9 October 1978 (aged 33)
C		(Portugal)	Nuno Marçal	2.05 m (6 ft 8 1/2 in)		14 November 1975 (aged 36)
G		(United States)	Reginald Jackson	1.80 m (5 ft 11 in)		14 November 1984 (aged 27)
F		(United States)	Rob Johnson	2.03 m (6 ft 8 in)		20 January 1984 (aged 28)
F		(Portugal)	Rui Lopes	1.95 m (6 ft 5 in)		17 October 1993 (aged 18)

== (Mozambique) Maxaquene ==
Maxaquene – 2012 Supertaça Compal – 6th place roster
Players							Coaches
Pos	#	Nat	Name	Height	Weight	Age	Head Coach
C		(Mozambique)	Armando Baptista	2.00 m (6 ft 6 1/2 in)		2 June 1985 (aged 26)	(Spain) Iñaki Garcia
F		(Mozambique)	Custódio Muchate	1.98 m (6 ft 6 in)		6 May 1982 (aged 29)
F		(Mozambique)	David Canivete	1.90 m (6 ft 3 in)		9 August 1989 (aged 22)	Assistant coach(es)
F		(Mozambique)	Fernando Mandlate	1.90 m (6 ft 3 in)		11 August 1985 (aged 26)
		(Mozambique)	Ivan Cossa
		(Mozambique)	Manuel Uamusse			15 October 1990 (aged 21)
		(Grenada)	Michael Bonaparte	1.96 m (6 ft 5 in)		22 November 1982 (aged 29)
		(Mozambique)	Pedro Mourana			17 March 1990 (aged 21)
G		(Mozambique)	Pio Matos Jr	1.85 m (6 ft 1 in)		29 November 1990 (aged 21)
G		(Mozambique)	Samora Mucavel	1.85 m (6 ft 1 in)		9 September 1986 (aged 25)
F		(Mozambique)	Sérgio Macuacua	1.98 m (6 ft 6 in)		2 October 1980 (aged 31)
F		(Mozambique)	Sílvio Letela	1.90 m (6 ft 3 in)		6 December 1982 (aged 29)
F		(Mozambique)	Stélio Nuaila	1.95 m (6 ft 5 in)		24 April 1985 (aged 26)

== (Angola) Petro Atlético ==
Petro Atlético – 2012 Supertaça Compal – Gold Medal roster
Players							Coaches
Pos	#	Nat	Name	Height	Weight	Age	Head Coach
SG		(Rwanda) (United States)	Cedric Isom	1.88 m (6 ft 2 in)		1 January 1984 (aged 28)	(Portugal) Alberto Babo
PG		(Angola)	Bráulio Morais	1.90 m (6 ft 3 in)	88 kg (194 lb)	17 December 1990 (aged 21)
SG		(Angola)	Carlos Morais	1.93 m (6 ft 4 in)	91 kg (201 lb)	16 October 1985 (aged 26)	Assistant coach(es)
C		(Angola)	Hermenegildo Mbunga	2.06 m (6 ft 9 in)	109 kg (240 lb)	4 September 1985 (aged 26)	(Angola) Manuel Silva (Gi)
		(Angola)	Hélder Gonçalves				(Angola) Victor de Carvalho
F		(Angola)	Paulo Barros	1.95 m (6 ft 5 in)		13 March 1989 (aged 22)
PG		(Canada) (Angola)	Paulo Santana	1.85 m (6 ft 1 in)	77 kg (170 lb)	28 April 1984 (aged 27)
C		(Angola)	Miguel Kiala	2.04 m (6 ft 8 1/2 in)	91 kg (201 lb)	10 November 1990 (aged 21)
SF		(Angola)	Roberto Fortes	1.93 m (6 ft 4 in)		9 November 1984 (aged 27)
PF		(United States)	Roderick Nealy	2.01 m (6 ft 7 in)		6 September 1980 (aged 31)
		(Angola)	Simão Santos	1.98 m (6 ft 6 in)	91 kg (201 lb)	21 July 1982 (aged 29)
C		(Angola)	Abdel Gomes	2.03 m (6 ft 8 in)		21 May 1989 (aged 22)

== (Angola) Primeiro de Agosto ==
Primeiro de Agosto – 2012 Supertaça Compal – 4th place roster
Players							Coaches
Pos	#	Nat	Name	Height	Weight	Age	Head Coach
PG		(Angola)	Hermenegildo Santos	1.80 m (5 ft 11 in)		16 August 1990 (aged 21)	(Portugal) Luís Magalhães
PG		(Angola)	Armando Costa	1.92 m (6 ft 3 1/2 in)	91 kg (201 lb)	3 June 1983 (aged 28)
PG		(Angola)	Adilson Baza	1.85 m (6 ft 1 in)		25 April 1986 (aged 25)	Assistant coach(es)
SF		(Angola)	Islando Manuel	1.92 m (6 ft 3 1/2 in)		1 January 1991 (aged 21)	(Angola) Walter Costa
PF		(Angola) (United States)	Reggie Moore	1.98 m (6 ft 6 in)	107 kg (236 lb)	31 March 1981 (aged 30)
C		(Angola)	Felizardo Ambrósio	2.02 m (6 ft 7 1/2 in)	97 kg (214 lb)	25 December 1987 (aged 24)
C		(Angola)	Joaquim Gomes	2.00 m (6 ft 6 1/2 in)	100 kg (220 lb)	23 December 1980 (aged 31)
G		(Angola)	Domingos Bonifácio	1.84 m (6 ft 1/2 in)	76 kg (168 lb)	28 October 1984 (aged 27)
		(Angola)	Filipe Abraão	1.94 m (6 ft 4 1/2 in)	88 kg (194 lb)	31 December 1979 (aged 32)
F		(Angola)	Carlos Almeida	1.93 m (6 ft 4 in)	91 kg (201 lb)	1 January 19 (aged 1993)
PG		(Angola)	Miguel Lutonda	1.86 m (6 ft 1 in)	78 kg (172 lb)	24 September 1976 (aged 35)
PF		(Angola)	Leonel Paulo	1.97 m (6 ft 5 1/2 in)	114 kg (251 lb)	30 April 1986 (aged 25)
SF		(Cape Verde)	Mário Correia	1.89 m (6 ft 2 1/2 in)		17 March 1978 (aged 33)

== (Angola) Recreativo do Libolo ==
Recreativo do Libolo – 2012 Supertaça Compal – Bronze Medal roster
Players							Coaches
Pos	#	Nat	Name	Height	Weight	Age	Head Coach
F		(Angola)	Olímpio Cipriano	1.94 m (6 ft 4 1/2 in)	93 kg (205 lb)	9 April 1982 (aged 29)	(Angola) Raúl Duarte
F		(Angola)	Luís Costa	1.94 m (6 ft 4 1/2 in)	93 kg (205 lb)	7 June 1978 (aged 33)
G		(Angola)	Francisco Sousa	1.84 m (6 ft 1/2 in)		30 May 1982 (aged 29)	Assistant coach(es)
F		(Angola)	Edson Ndoniema	1.94 m (6 ft 4 1/2 in)		11 February 1991 (aged 21)	(Angola) Ricardo Rodrigues
G		(Angola)	Edson Ferreira	1.84 m (6 ft 1/2 in)		7 August 1985 (aged 26)
G		(Angola)	Mayzer Alexandre	1.84 m (6 ft 1/2 in)		29 June 1984 (aged 27)
PF		(Angola)	Vladimir Ricardino	1.98 m (6 ft 6 in)	93 kg (205 lb)	4 October 1978 (aged 33)
		(Angola)	Escórcio António
C		(Angola) (Chad)	Abdel Bouckar	2.02 m (6 ft 7 1/2 in)	109 kg (240 lb)	8 April 1980 (aged 31)
PF		(United States)	Tommie Eddie	1.98 m (6 ft 6 in)		7 September 1982 (aged 29)
C		(Angola)	Mutu Fonseca	2.02 m (6 ft 7 1/2 in)		9 September 1989 (aged 22)
		(Angola)	José Miguel			20 August 1985 (aged 26)
