= 2006 Portuguese Basketball Champions Tournament =

The Portuguese Basketball Champions Tournament was a competition for Portuguese teams that play in the Portuguese Basketball League (LCB).

It was won by Ovarense, beating Benfica 69-57 in the final.

== Qualifying ==
=== Group A ===
Played in Casino Ginásio pavilion

Team	Pld	W	L	PF	PA
Casino Ginásio	2	1	1	155	141
Lusitania Angra	2	1	1	156	155
CAB Madeira	2	1	1	156	171

Casino Ginásio	87 - 69	CAB Madeira
Casino Ginásio	68 - 72	Lusitania
CAB Madeira	87 - 84	Lusitania

=== Group B ===
Played in CF Belenenses pavilion

Team	Pld	W	L	PF	PA
Benfica	2	2		169	135
CF Belenenses	2	1	1	157	152
Barreirense	2	1	1	145	159
Queluz Sintra	2		2	139	161

Barreirense	70 - 84	Benfica
CF Belenenses	92 - 70	Queluz Sintra
Barreirense	75 - 69	Queluz Sintra
CF Belenenses	65 - 85	Benfica

== Final phase ==
Played in Portalegre

Ovarense and FC Porto automatic qualified as LCB Champion and Portuguese Cup Winner.

Quarter Finals
Lusitania Angra	86
Casino Ginasio	68
CF Belenenses	72
Benfica	81

SemiFinals
Lusitania Angra	81
Ovarense	97
Benfica	65
FC Porto	59

Finals
Ovarense	69
Benfica	57

MVP: (United States) Shawn Jackson - Ovarense

2006/07 Portuguese Basketball Champions Tournament Winner:
Ovarense
