= James Ellisor =

American basketball player

Personal information
- Born: March 9, 1990 (age 36) Glendale, Arizona, U.S.
- Listed height: 1.95 m (6 ft 5 in)
- Listed weight: 91 kg (201 lb)

Career information
- College: Bemidji State (2010–2012)
- Position: Small forward
- Number: 34

Career history
- 2015–2019: UD Oliveirense
- 2019–2021: Sporting CP
- 2021–2022: Granada
- 2022–2023: Benfica
- 2023–2024: Stjarnan

Career highlights
- 4× Portuguese League champion (2018, 2019, 2021, 2023); 3× Portuguese Cup winner (2020, 2021, 2023); Portuguese League Cup winner (2019); Portuguese Supercup champion (2018); Daktronics Division II National Player of the Year (2012)

James Ammon Ellisor (born March 9, 1990) is a professional basketball player. During his career, he has won the Liga Portuguesa de Basquetebol four times and the Portuguese Basketball Cup three times.

== College career ==
James played college basketball for Glendale Gauchos and Bemidji State Beavers where he was named the Daktronics Division II National Player of the Year in 2012.

== Professional career ==
In 2022–2023, James averaged 7.6 points, 2.9 rebounds and 1.5 assists per game for S.L. Benfica, helping them win the Portuguese national championship.

In October 2023, James signed with Stjarnan of the Úrvalsdeild karla.

== Honours ==
Oliveirense

- Portuguese League: 2017–18, 2018–19
- Portuguese League Cup: 2019
- Portuguese Supercup: 2018

Sporting

- Portuguese League: 2020–21
- Portuguese Cup: 2020, 2021

Benfica

- Portuguese League: 2022–23
- Portuguese Cup: 2023
