= Travante Williams =

American basketball player

No. 4 – Chorale Roanne
- Position: Small forward
- League: LNB Élite

Personal information
- Born: July 29, 1993 (age 33) Anchorage, Alaska, U.S.
- Listed height: 1.93 m (6 ft 4 in)
- Listed weight: 91 kg (201 lb)

Career information
- College: City College of San Francisco (2012–2014); Adams State (2014–2015); University of Alaska Fairbanks (2015–2016)
- NBA draft: 2016: undrafted
- Playing career: 2016–present

Career history
- 2016–2017: Tskaltubo
- 2017–2019: UD Oliveirense
- 2019–2023: Sporting CP
- 2023–2024: Manresa
- 2024–2025: CSM Oradea
- 2025–2026: Le Mans Sarthe
- 2026–present: Chorale Roanne

Career highlights
- 3× Portuguese League champion (2018, 2019, 2021); Portuguese League Defender of the Year (2023); 3× Portuguese Cup winner (2020–2022); 3× Portuguese League Cup winner (2019, 2022, 2023); 3× Portuguese Supercup winner (2018, 2021, 2022)

Travante António Williams (born July 29, 1993) is an American-born naturalized Portuguese professional basketball player for Chorale Roanne of the LNB Élite and the Portugal national team. Before going to Portugal to play professionally, Williams played college basketball for the City College of San Francisco, Adams State University and the University of Alaska Fairbanks.

== National team career ==
On August 21, 2025, Williams was named to Portugal's final roster for EuroBasket 2025. In the tournament, he led the Portuguese team in minutes and was second on the team in points, as they made the knockout rounds for the first time in team history.

== Honours ==
Oliveirense

- Portuguese League: 2017–18, 2018–19
- Portuguese League Cup: 2019
- Portuguese Supercup: 2018

Sporting

- Portuguese League: 2020–21
- Portuguese Cup: 2020, 2021
- Portuguese League Cup: 2022, 2023
- Portuguese Supercup: 2021, 2022

Individual

- Portuguese League Defender of the Year: 2023
