= Miguel Miranda (basketball) =

Portuguese basketball player (born 1978)

Personal information
- Born: October 9, 1978 (age 48) Porto
- Listed height: 6 ft 8.7 in (2.05 m)
- Listed weight: 216 lb (98 kg)

Career information
- Playing career: 1996–2018
- Position: Forward-center

Career history

Playing
- 1996–2000: FC Porto
- 2000–2006: CA Queluz
- 2006–2010: Ovarense
- 2010–2012: FC Porto
- 2012–2016: Ovarense
- 2016–2018: FC Porto

Coaching
- 2021–present: Vitória S.C.

Miguel Ângelo Saraiva Miranda (born October 9, 1978, Porto) is a Portuguese former basketball player.

== Coaching career ==
Miranda began coaching Vitória S.C. in the 2021–22 season. Despite having a smaller budget than other teams, he was able to make them a competitive team. In the 2023–24 season, they finished seventh, and were eliminated in the quarterfinals round of the playoffs.

Miranda renewed his contract with the team for one more season.

== Personal life ==
In 2023, Miranda underwent surgery for an aneurysm.

== Honours ==
FC Porto

- Portuguese League: 1996–97, 1998–99, 2010–11
- Portuguese Cup: 1996–97, 1998–99, 1999–00, 2011–12
- Portuguese League Cup: 1999–00, 2011–12
- Portuguese Supercup: 1997, 1999, 2011, 2016
- António Pratas Trophy: 2011

CA Queluz

- Portuguese League: 2004–05
- Portuguese Cup: 2004–05
- Portuguese Supercup: 2005

Ovarense

- Portuguese League: 2006–07, 2007–08
- Portuguese Cup: 2008–09
- Portuguese Supercup: 2006, 2007, 2008
- António Pratas Trophy: 2009, 2014
- Champions Tournament: 2006–07, 2007–08
