= 2010 Supertaça Compal =

- League: Supertaça Compal
- Sport: Basketball
- Duration: April 2 – 4 2010
- Teams: 4
- TV partner: TPA1 (Angola) TPA Internacional (Worldwide) Supersport (Africa)

Supertaça Compal season
- Winner: Benfica
- Season MVP: Miguel Lutonda

Supertaça Compal seasons
- ← 2009 2011 →

The 2010 Supertaça Compal was the first edition of the Supertaça Compal, taking place in Luanda, Angola from April 2 to 4, 2010. It was contested by four teams from Portugal and Angola in a single round robin system. Benfica of Portugal was the winner and Miguel Lutonda from Primeiro de Agosto was the tournament's MVP.

== 2010 Supertaça Compal participants ==
Team	Status	Home
(Portugal) Benfica	2009 Portuguese champion	Lisbon
(Portugal) Ovarense	2009 Portuguese Cup winner	Ovar
(Angola) Petro Atlético	2009 Angola cup runner-up	Luanda
(Angola) Primeiro de Agosto	2009 Angolan champion	Luanda

== 2010 Supertaça Compal squads ==
- (Angola) 1º de Agosto vs. (Angola) Petro Atlético

April 2, 2010
17:00 WAT

Report (in Portuguese)

(Angola) 1º de Agosto	72–67	(Angola) Petro Atlético
Scoring by quarter: 23-20, 15-14, 18-10, 26-23
Pts: Lutonda 17		Pts: C.Terry 16

Pavilhão da Cidadela, Luanda

- (Portugal) S.L. Benfica vs. (Portugal) Ovarense

April 2, 2010
19:00 WAT

Report (in Portuguese)

(Portugal) S.L. Benfica	69–55	(Portugal) Ovarense
Scoring by quarter: 18-19, 25-10, 16-20, 10-6
Pts: S.Ramos 19		Pts: J.Waller 21

Pavilhão da Cidadela, Luanda

- (Portugal) S.L. Benfica vs. (Angola) Petro Atlético

April 3, 2012
19:00 WAT

Report (in Portuguese)

(Portugal) S.L. Benfica	87–52	(Angola) Petro Atlético
Scoring by quarter: 27-14, 16-15, 24-7, 20-16
Pts: J.Santos 25		Pts: C.Terry 13

Pavilhão da Cidadela, Luanda

- (Angola) 1º de Agosto vs. (Portugal) Ovarense

April 3, 2010
17:00

Report (in Portuguese)

(Angola) 1º de Agosto	77–55	(Portugal) Ovarense
Scoring by quarter: 18-19, 25-10, 16-20, 10-6
Pts: C.Almeida 13		Pts: J.Waller 15

Pavilhão da Cidadela, Luanda

- (Angola) Petro Atlético vs. (Portugal) Ovarense

April 4, 2010
17:00 WAT

Report (in Portuguese)

(Angola) Petro Atlético	66–59	(Portugal) Ovarense
Scoring by quarter: 13-19, 26-28, 16-20, 10-6
Pts: E.Mingas 16		Pts: J.Waller 13

Pavilhão da Cidadela, Luanda

- (Portugal) S.L. Benfica vs. (Angola) 1º de Agosto

April 4, 2010
19:00 WAT

(Portugal) S.L. Benfica	64–57	(Angola) 1º de Agosto
Pts: S.Ramos 14		Pts: Lutonda 14

Pavilhão da Cidadela, Luanda

== Final standings ==
P	Team	Record
1	(Portugal) Benfica	3–0
2	(Angola) Primeiro de Agosto	2–1
3	(Angola) Petro Atlético	1–2
4	(Portugal) Ovarense	0–3

== Awards ==
- (Angola) Miguel Lutonda (Primeiro de Agosto) – MVP
- (United States) John Waller (Ovarense) – Top scorer

2010 Supertaça Compal

Benfica
1st Title

Most Valuable Player
(Angola) Miguel Lutonda

== See also ==
- COMPAL
- Federação Angolana de Basquetebol
- Federação Portuguesa de Basquetebol
