= Goran Karadžić =

Serbian basketball player

Personal information
- Born: December 22, 1974 (age 51) Belgrade, SR Serbia, SFR Yugoslavia
- Listed height: 2.00 m (6 ft 6 1/2 in)
- Listed weight: 100 kg (220 lb)

Career information
- NBA draft: 1996: undrafted
- Playing career: 1993–2004
- Position: Shooting guard / small forward
- Number: 5, 7, 15

Career history
- 1993–1997: Crvena zvezda
- 1998–1999: Polonia Warszawa
- 1999–2000: Zepter Śląsk
- 2000–2002: TSK uniVersa Bamberg
- 2002: Bayer Giants Leverkusen
- 2004: Casino Ginásio
Medals
Men's basketball
Representing FR Yugoslavia
European Championship for 22 and Under
Bronze medal – third place	1996 Turkey	U22 Team

Goran Karadžić (Serbian Cyrillic: Горан Караџић; born December 22, 1974) is a Serbian hotel manager and former professional basketball player.

== Playing career ==
Karadžić played for the Crvena zvezda of the Yugoslav League. In the 1993–94 season, he won the Yugoslav League with Zvezda and played together with Dragoljub Vidačić, Ivica Mavrenski, Saša Obradović, Mileta Lisica, Aleksandar Trifunović, and Dejan Tomašević.

In 1998, he went abroad. During next couple of years he played in Poland (Polonia and Zepter Śląsk), Germany (TSK uniVersa Bamberg and Bayer Giants Leverkusen), and Portugal (Casino Ginásio).

== National team career ==
Karadžić was a member of the FR Yugoslavia national under-22 team that won the bronze medal at the 1996 European Championship for 22 and Under in Turkey. Over five tournament games, he averaged 4.0 points, 2.2 rebounds and 0.8 assists per game.

== Career achievements ==
- Yugoslav League champion: 1 (with Crvena zvezda: 1993–94)
- Portuguese Basketball Champions Tournament winner: 1 (with Casino Ginásio: 2003–04)
- Yugoslav Super Cup winner: 1 (with Crvena zvezda: 1993)

== Post-playing career ==
Karadžić has been a general manager of the Stara Planina Resort since November 2015. Also, he has been the deputy general manager of the Slavija Hotels since June 2014.
