= Norberto Alves =

Portuguese basketball coach (born 1968)

S.L. Benfica
- Position: Head coach
- League: Liga Portuguesa de Basquetebol; Champions League

Personal information
- Born: 19 March 1968 (age 58) Coimbra, Portugal

Career history

Coaching
- 2003: Académica de Coimbra
- 2004–2006: Benfica
- 2006–2013: Académica de Coimbra
- 2013–2016: Desportivo do Libolo
- 2017–2021: Oliveirense
- 2021–present: Benfica

Career highlights
- FIBA Africa Basketball League champion (2014); 6× Portuguese League champion (2017, 2018, 2022, 2023, 2024, 2025); Portuguese Cup winner (2023); 3× Portuguese League Cup champion (2019, 2020, 2024); 2× Portuguese Supercup champion (2018, 2023); Angolan League champion (2014); 2× Angolan Cup champion (2015, 2016); Angolan Supercup champion (2016)

Norberto Almeida Monteiro Alves (born 19 March 1968) is a Portuguese basketball head coach for S.L. Benfica of the Liga Portuguesa de Basquetebol.

== Professional career ==
In 2019, Alves guided U.D. Oliveirense to its second national title in league history, against S.L. Benfica.
