= Diogo Araújo =

Portuguese basketball player (born 1997)

No. 20 – Sporting CP
- Position: Small forward
- League: Portuguese Basketball League

Personal information
- Born: 16 April 1997 (age 29) Figueira da Foz, Portugal
- Listed height: 1.99 m (6 ft 6 in)
- Listed weight: 83 kg (183 lb)

Career history
- 2015–2019: FC Porto
- 2019–: Sporting CP

Diogo Mendes Araújo (born 16 April 1997) is a Portuguese professional basketball player who plays for Sporting CP.

== Honours ==
FC Porto

- Portuguese Cup: 2018–19
