= Diogo Carreira =

Portuguese basketball player (born 1978)

Personal information
- Born: December 2, 1978 (age 47) Barreiro, Portugal
- Listed height: 5 ft 11 in (1.80 m)
- Listed weight: 179 lb (81 kg)

Career information
- Playing career: 1997–2016
- Position: Point guard

Career history
- 1997–1998: Portugal Telecom
- 1998–2000: Seixal
- 2000–2001: Portugal Telecom
- 2001–2002: Barreirense
- 2002–2004: Seixal
- 2004–2005: Barreirense
- 2005–2008: Belenenses
- 2008–2016: Benfica

Diogo Carreira (born December 2, 1978) is a Portuguese retired basketball player.

A point guard, Carreira spent his entire career in his home-country, being mostly associated with Seixal, Belenenses and Benfica, winning several honours with the latter.

== Career ==
Born in Barreiro, Carreira interested in basketball was sparked by a cousin, who took him to Barreirense, where he started competing at age 9. In 1997, he started his professional career in the basketball section of telecommunications company, Portugal Telecom, staying for one season, before moving to Seixal. After two seasons with the Seixal team, he returned to Portugal Telecom, where he won his first league title, and made his first cap for the national team.

In 2002, the 23-year-old had his first spell at his hometown club, Barreirense, representing them for one year, before returning to Seixal for a second stint, in the season immediately after. In 2004, he moved clubs again, joining Barreirense for a second time, again for just one year, as he left for Belenenses on 15 June 2005.

In 2008, Carreira moved to Benfica, helping in the resurgence of the club, winning multiple league and cup titles, and competing in European basket in the 2010-11 and 2014-15 editions of the EuroChallenge. He underwent surgery in his right knee in the summer of 2015, which caused him to miss the first half of the 2015–16 season, only returning to competition in February 2016. He retired at the end of the season at age 37, after eight years with Benfica.

== Personal life ==
In August 2009, Carreira was one of the first Portuguese to contract H1N1, in an outbreak that started in the club youth ranks. Less than a year later, he was diagnosed with a benign tumor, adjacent to his right ear. After it was surgically removed, Carreira made a full recovery.

== Honours ==
Benfica

- Portuguese League (6): 2008–09, 2009–10, 2011–12, 2012–13, 2013–14, 2014–15
- Portuguese Cup: 2013–14, 2014–15, 2015–16
- League Cup / Hugo dos Santos Cup: 2010–11, 2012–13, 2013–14, 2014–15
- Portuguese Supercup (6): 2009, 2010, 2012, 2013, 2014, 2015
- António Pratas Trophy: 2008–09, 2011–12, 2012–13, 2014–15, 2015–16
- Portugal-Angola Supercup: 2009–10
