= João Fernandes (basketball) =

Angolan basketball player

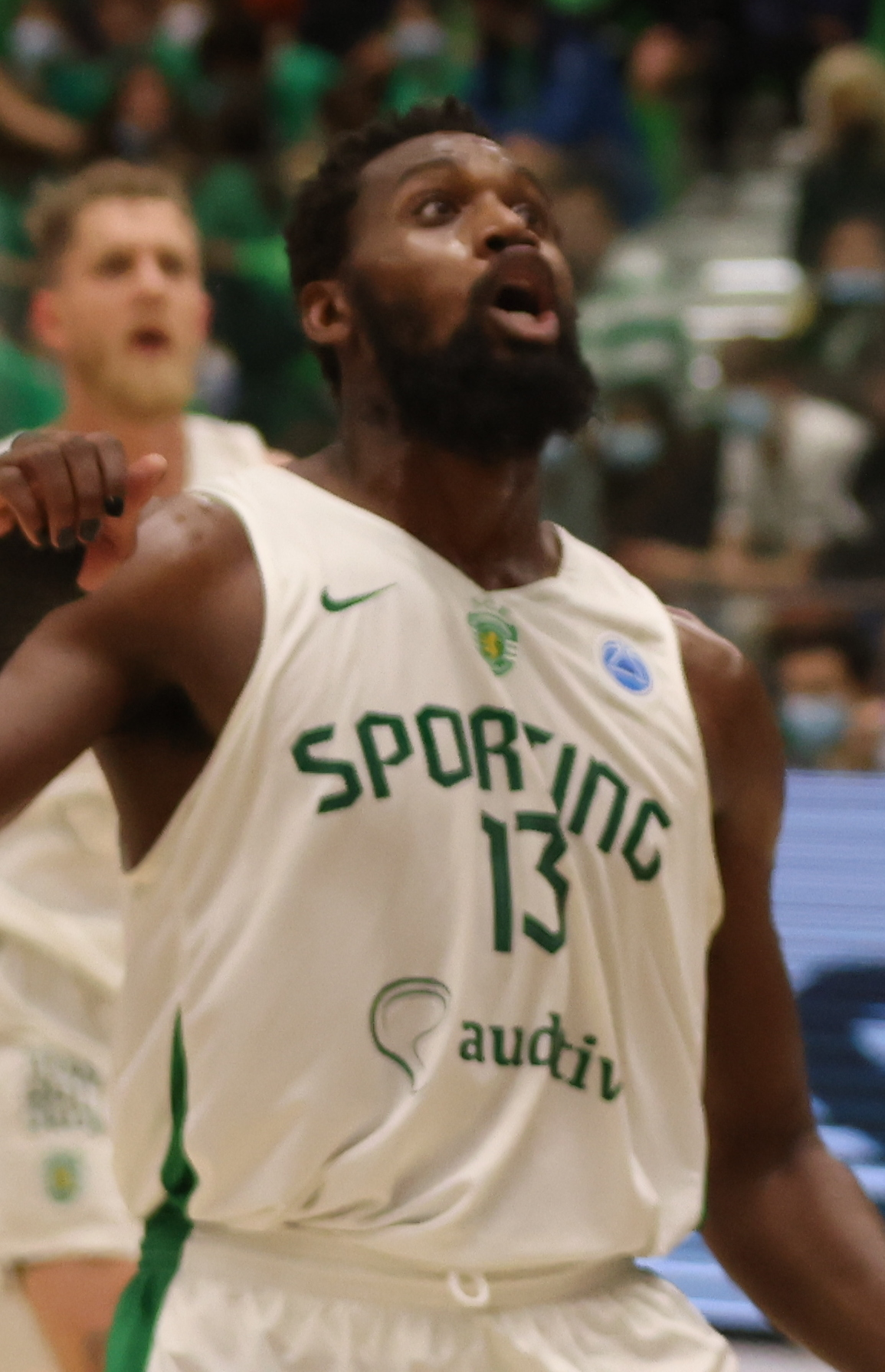

No. 13 – Sporting CP
- Position: Center
- League: Portuguese Basketball League

Personal information
- Born: 1 December 1992 (age 33) Luanda, Angola
- Listed height: 2.00 m (6 ft 7 in)
- Listed weight: 100 kg (220 lb)

Career history
- 2012–2014: Illiabum Clube
- 2014–2015: Dragon Force
- 2015–2016: BC Barcelos
- 2016–2019: AD Ovarense
- 2019–2023: Sporting CP
- 2023–2025: Oliveirense
- 2025–present: Sporting CP

Career highlights
- 3× LPB champion; 3× Portuguese Cup winner; 3× Portuguese SuperCup winner; 4× Portuguese League Cup winner
Medals
Men's basketball
Representing Angola
AfroBasket
Gold medal – first place	2025 Angola

João Paulo da Costa Fernandes (born 1 December 1992) is an Angolan professional basketball player who plays for Sporting CP. Fernandes has played the majority of his professional career in Portugal, where he has won 13 trophies. He also plays for the Angola national team, with who he played at the World Cup in 2019, and at the AfroBasket in 2021 and 2025.
