= Luís Magalhães =

Portuguese basketball coach (born 1958)

Sporting CP
- Position: Head coach
- League: Portuguese Basketball League

Personal information
- Born: 1958 (age 67–68) Portugal

Career history

Coaching
- 2000–2003: Portugal Telecom
- 2003–2004: FC Porto
- 2006–2007: Ovarense
- 2008–2011: 1º de Agosto
- 2012–2013: Rec do Libolo
- 2019–present: Sporting CP

Career highlights
- 3× FIBA Africa Basketball League champion (2008–2010); 3× Angolan League champion (2008–2010); 2× Angolan Cup champion (2008, 2009); 4× Angolan Supercup champion (2008–2011); 3× Victorino Cunha Cup champion (2009, 2011, 2013); 6× Portuguese League champion (2001–2003, 2006–2007, 2021); 6× Portuguese Cup champion (2001, 2002, 2004, 2020, 2021, 2022); 4× Portuguese Supercup champion (2002, 2004, 2007, 2021); 1x Portuguese League Cup champion (2022); Portuguese Champions Tournament champion (2007)
Medals
Men's basketball
Representing Angola
AfroBasket
Gold medal – first place	Benghazi 2009	Angola
FIBA Africa Clubs Champions Cup
Gold medal – first place	Sousse 2008	1º de Agosto
Gold medal – first place	Kigali 2009	1º de Agosto
Gold medal – first place	Cotonou 2010	1º de Agosto

Luís Manuel Magalhães (Portuguese pronunciation: [luˈiʒ mɐɣɐˈʎɐ̃jʃ]; born 1958) is a Portuguese-Angolan basketball coach. He is a former head coach of the Angola national basketball team. He succeeded Portuguese-Angolan native Alberto Carvalho in 2009, and coached Angola at the FIBA Africa Championship 2009, where the team won its seventh consecutive African championship.

Prior to moving to Angola, Magalhães was one of the best coaches in Portuguese basketball. He led three teams to the Portuguese Basketball Premier League title - Portugal Telecom (2000–01, 2001–02, 2002–03), FC Porto (2003–04), and Ovarense (2006–07). He moved to Angolan side Primeiro de Agosto, where he was the head coach from January 2008 to June 2011, winning 12 titles, amidst national and international competitions.

From 2012 to 2013, he has been the head coach of Angolan side Recreativo do Libolo. Since 2019, is the head coach of Sporting CP.

== See also ==
- List of FIBA AfroBasket winning head coaches
