= Compal =

Compal may refer to:

- Compal Electronics, a Taiwanese manufacturer
- Sumol + Compal, a Portuguese food and beverages company
