= Jorge Coelho =

Jorge Coelho may refer to:

- Jorge Coelho (basketball)
- Jorge Coelho (politician)
