= Ricky Franklin =

American basketball player (born 1987)

Personal information
- Born: January 17, 1987 (age 39) Milwaukee, Wisconsin, U.S.
- Listed height: 6 ft 2 in (1.88 m)
- Listed weight: 205 lb (93 kg)

Career information
- High school: Riverside (Milwaukee, Wisconsin)
- College: Milwaukee (2006–2010)
- NBA draft: 2010: undrafted
- Playing career: 2010–present
- Position: Shooting guard
- Number: 5

Career history
- 2010–2011: Kotwica Kołobrzeg
- 2011–2012: Lusitânia
- 2012–2013: Benfica
- 2013–2014: CAB Madeira
- 2014–2016: UB Chartres Métropole
- 2016–2017: CAB Madeira

Ricky Lenmond Franklin (born January 17, 1987) is an American basketball player who last played for CAB Madeira in the LCB.

== Career ==
Born in Milwaukee, Wisconsin, Franklin began his basketball career at Riverside University High School. In his senior senior year, Franklin logged averages of 21ppg, 10rbp and 5apg. Franklins impact led Riverside University to its highest city ranking and win totals since the 1970s. Franklin was a unanimous selection for the Wisconsin AP All State Team (2005).

Franklin was pursued by numerous D1 basketball programs, including Wisconsin but ultimately accepted a Division I NCAA scholarship at the University of Wisconsin–Milwaukee.

Over the four-year period he spent with the Panthers, he was a regular starter for coach Rob Jeter. During this time span, he also collaborated as gym coordinator for the Milwaukee Hillside Boys and Girls Club and coached 8th-grade basketball for Saint Marcus Lutheran school.

He ended his college career in 2009–10, with an average 14.7 points per game, a team best, earning All-Horizon League second-team selection, as one of the highest ranked players among Horizon League's active career players in 2010. He was third among active players in points (1,260) and is also third in three-pointers (189) and assists (321). He also ranked fourth in steals (111) and fifth in rebounds (475). He doubled his points per game since his freshman year, when he finished with an average of 7.2. In June 2010, he trained with the Milwaukee Bucks in the preseason, hoping to get a selection for the 2010 NBA Summer League in Las Vegas, which he later did.

Since he was not drafted by the NBA, Franklin moved to Europe, spending one year in Poland, at the SKK Kotwica Kołobrzeg, before arriving in Portugal, to play for the Azorean team, S.C. Lusitânia, where he helped them reach the semi-finals of the Liga Portuguesa de Basquetebol, He averaged 16.5 points per game, over 24 games that year, winning selection for Eurobasket.com Portuguese League All-Imports Team and 2nd Team.

This performances led the 25-year-old to join S.L. Benfica on 20 August 2012, spending the year mainly as a squad player, dropping his average to 6.3 points per game, but winning four titles over the season. On 24 September 2013, Franklin moved teams for a third consecutive year, signing with CAB Madeira. At Madeiran club, he regained starter status and help them reach the Portuguese Basketball League Cup final, losing it to his former team. In the league, he averaged 21.7 points per game over 17 games and was the competition top scorer, gaining him accolades by Eurobasket.com as All-Portuguese League Honorable Mention. On 20 July 2014, the American shooting guard moved to Union Basket Chartres Métropole, in the French third division, Nationale 1. He spent the next 18 months in France, returning to CAB Madeira for a second spell on 31 December 2016.

== Honours ==
Individual

- LPB leading scorer: 2014

Benfica

- Portuguese Basketball League (LCB): 2012–13
- Portuguese Basketball SuperCup: 2012
- Portuguese Basketball League Cup: 2012–13
- António Pratas Trophy: 2013
