= 2012 Supertaça Compal =

- League: Supertaça Compal
- Sport: Basketball
- Duration: February 14 – 19, 2012
- Teams: 6
- TV partners: TPA1 (Angola); TPA Internacional (Worldwide); Supersport (Africa)

Supertaça Compal season
- Winner: Petro Atlético

Supertaça Compal seasons
- ← 2011 2013 →

The 2012 Season of the Supertaça Compal, (3rd edition), took place in Benguela and Luanda, Angola from February 14 to 19, 2012 and was contested by six teams from Angola, Portugal and Mozambique split into two groups, each group playing in a round robin system, the first of each group playing for the title, the second for third place and the third for fifth place. Petro Atlético from Angola was the winner.

== Draw ==
Group A	Group B
(Portugal) CAB Madeira (Angola) Petro Atlético (Angola) Recreativo do Libolo	(Portugal) FC Porto (Mozambique) Maxaquene (Angola) Primeiro de Agosto

== Group stage ==
=== Group A ===
	Team	M	W	L	PF	PA	Diff	P
1.	(Angola) Petro Atlético	2	2	0	161	147	+14	4
2.	(Angola) Recreativo do Libolo	2	1	1	150	141	+9	3
3.	(Portugal) CAB Madeira	2	0	2	145	168	-23	2

February 14, 2012
19:00 WAT

Report (in Portuguese)

(Portugal) CAB Madeira	77–88	(Angola) Petro Atlético
Pts: A.Keanon 22		Pts: R.Nealy 19

Pavilhão Acácias Rubras, Benguela

February 15, 2012
17:00 WAT

Report (in Portuguese)

(Angola) Petro Atlético	73–70	(Angola) R. do Libolo
Scoring by quarter: 24-12, 14-22, 20-14, 15-22
Pts: R.Nealy 23		Pts: L.Costa 19

Pavilhão Acácias Rubras, Benguela

February 16, 2012
17:00 WAT

Report (in Portuguese)

(Angola) R. do Libolo	80–68	(Portugal) CAB Madeira
Scoring by quarter: 22-13, 18-21, 22-14, 18-20
Pts: Olímpio 19		Pts: A.Kenon 24

Pavilhão Acácias Rubras, Benguela

=== Group B ===
	Team	M	W	L	PF	PA	Diff	P
1.	(Portugal) FC Porto	2	2	0	144	122	+22	4
2.	(Angola) Primeiro de Agosto	2	1	1	149	117	+32	3
3.	(Mozambique) Maxaquene	2	0	2	103	157	-54	2

February 14, 2012
17:00 WAT

Report (in Portuguese)

(Portugal) FC Porto	74–56	(Mozambique) Maxaquene
Scoring by quarter: 18-10, 14-22, 26-10, 16-14
Pts: R.Johnson 16		Pts: S.Mukavela 13

Pavilhão Acácias Rubras, Benguela

February 15, 2012
19:00

Report (in Portuguese)

(Portugal) FC Porto	70–66	(Angola) 1º de Agosto
Scoring by quarter: 34-30, 14-20
Pts: R.Johnson 19		Pts: F.Ambrósio, R.Moore 11

Pavilhão Acácias Rubras, Benguela

February 16, 2012
19:00 WAT

Report (in Portuguese)

(Mozambique) Maxaquene	47–83	(Angola) 1º de Agosto
Pts: A.Baptista 13		Pts: R.Moore 12

Pavilhão Acácias Rubras, Benguela

== Classification matches ==
=== 5th place match ===
February 18, 2012
17:00 WAT

(Portugal) CAB Madeira	75–57	(Mozambique) Maxaquene
Scoring by quarter: 19-20, 13-6, 27-16, 16-15
Pts: A.Kenon 15		Pts: S.Mucavele 16

Pavilhão da Cidadela, Luanda

=== 3rd place match ===
February 18, 2012
19:00 WAT

Report (in Portuguese)

(Angola) R. do Libolo	79–65	(Angola) 1º de Agosto
Scoring by quarter: 9-20, 29-12, 27-23, 24-10
Pts: Olímpio 26		Pts: R.Moore 13

Pavilhão da Cidadela, Luanda

=== Final ===
February 19, 2012
19:00 WAT

Report (in Portuguese)

(Angola) Petro Atlético	64–51	(Portugal) FC Porto
Scoring by quarter: 16-22, 23-7, 15-13, 10-9
Pts: C.Morais 16		Pts: R.Johnson 16

Pavilhão da Cidadela, Luanda

== Final standings ==
Rank	Team	Record
Gold medal	(Angola) Petro Atlético	3–0
Silver medal	(Portugal) FC Porto	2–1
Bronze medal	(Angola) Recreativo do Libolo	2–1
4	(Angola) Primeiro de Agosto	1–2
5	(Portugal) CAB Madeira	1–2
6	(Mozambique) Maxaquene	0–3

2012 Supertaça Compal

Atlético Petróleos de Luanda
1st Title

Most Valuable Player

== See also ==
- COMPAL
- Federação Angolana de Basquetebol
- Federação Portuguesa de Basquetebol
