= Supertaça Compal =

- Current season, competition or edition: 2012 Supertaça Compal
- Sport: Basketball
- Founded: 2010
- Continent: FIBA Africa (Africa), FIBA Europe, (Europe)
- Most recent champion: Petro Atlético (2012)

The Supertaça Compal (named after its major sponsor COMPAL) or Supertaça da Lusofonia (in English: SuperCup of the Lusophony) is an annual basketball tournament contested by the champions and cup winner teams from Lusophonic (Portuguese-speaking) countries. The event is jointly organized by the Basketball federations of Angola and Portugal.

The first edition of the tournament was played in 2010 between teams from Portugal and Angola. In 2012, a team from Mozambique was invited to play the tournament.

== Participation details ==
P	Club	(Angola) 2010	(Portugal) 2011	(Angola) 2012	Years
1	(Angola) Primeiro de Agosto	2010	2011	4	3
2	(Angola) Petro Atlético	2010		2012	2
3	(Portugal) Benfica	2010	4		2
4	(Portugal) FC Porto		2011	2012	2
4	(Angola) Recreativo do Libolo		2011	2012	2
5	(Portugal) Ovarense	4			1
6	(Portugal) CAB Madeira			5	1
7	(Mozambique) Maxaquene			6	1

== Seasons ==
- 2010 Supertaça Compal
- 2011 Supertaça Compal
- 2012 Supertaça Compal

== Winners by club ==
Team	Wins
(Angola) Petro Atlético	1
(Angola) Primeiro de Agosto	1
(Portugal) Benfica	1

== Winners by country ==
Country	Wins
Angola	2
Portugal	1
