= Reginald Jackson =

Reginald Jackson may refer to:

- Reginald Jackson (bishop) (1954–2025), American religious leader in the African Methodist Episcopal Church
- Reginald Jackson (Australian politician) (1897–1969), Australian politician
- Reginald Jackson (Mississippi politician), member of the Mississippi State Senate
- Reg Jackson (1913–1989), Australian police officer, 15th Chief Commissioner of Victoria Police
- Reggie Jackson (Reginald Martinez Jackson, born 1946), American baseball player
- Reginald Jackson, American player for FC do Porto in 2012 Supertaça Compal Squads

== See also ==
- Reggie Jackson (disambiguation)
