= 2011 Supertaça Compal =

- League: Supertaça Compal
- Sport: Basketball
- Duration: February 11 – 13 2011
- Teams: 4
- TV partner: TPA1 (Angola) TPA Internacional (Worldwide) Supersport (Africa)

Supertaça Compal season
- Winner: Primeiro de Agosto
- Season MVP: Felizardo Ambrósio

Supertaça Compal seasons
- ← 2010 2012 →

The 2011 Season of the Supertaça Compal (2nd edition), took place in Lisbon, Portugal from February 11 to 13, 2011, in Portugal and was contested by four teams in a single round robin system. Primeiro de Agosto of Angola was the winner and Felizardo Ambrósio from Primeiro de Agosto, the tournament's MVP.

== 2011 Supertaça Compal participants ==
Team	Home
(Portugal) Benfica	Lisbon
(Portugal) FC Porto	Porto
(Angola) Primeiro de Agosto	Luanda
(Angola) Recreativo do Libolo	Luanda

== 2011 Supertaça Compal squads ==
- (Angola) 1º de Agosto vs. (Angola) R. do Libolo

February 11, 2011
19:00 WEST

Report (in Portuguese)

(Angola) 1º de Agosto	77–76	(Angola) R. do Libolo
Scoring by quarter: 16-11, 19-20, 29-30, 13-15
Pts: F.Ambrósio 16		Pts: R.Moore 22

Pavilhão de Campo Pequeno, Lisbon

- (Portugal) FC Porto vs. (Portugal) Benfica

February 11, 2011
21:00 WEST

(Portugal) FC Porto	72–64	(Portugal) Benfica

Pavilhão de Campo Pequeno, Lisbon

- (Angola) 1º de Agosto vs. (Portugal) Benfica

February 12, 2011
19:00 WEST

Report (in Portuguese)

(Angola) 1º de Agosto	95–89 (OT)	(Portugal) Benfica
Scoring by quarter: 15-15, 17-19, 24-29, 22-15
Pts: F.Ambrósio 22		Pts: M.Williams 24

Pavilhão de Campo Pequeno, Lisbon

- (Angola) R. do Libolo vs. (Portugal) FC Porto

February 12, 2011
17:00 WEST

Report (in Portuguese)

(Angola) R. do Libolo	83–74	(Portugal) FC Porto
Pts: R.Moore 30		Pts: J.Terrell 19

Pavilhão de Campo Pequeno, Lisbon

- (Angola) R. do Libolo vs. (Portugal) Benfica

February 13, 2011
17:00 WEST

Report (in Portuguese)

(Angola) R. do Libolo	109–107	(Portugal) Benfica
Pts: R.Moore 41		Pts: H.Evans 25

Pavilhão de Campo Pequeno, Lisbon

- (Angola) 1º de Agosto vs. (Portugal) FC Porto

February 13, 2011
19:00 WEST

Report (in Portuguese)

(Angola) 1º de Agosto	96–87	(Portugal) FC Porto
Pts: F.Ambrósio 22		Pts: M.Williams 24

Pavilhão de Campo Pequeno, Lisbon

== Final standings ==
P	Team	Pts
1	(Angola) Primeiro de Agosto	6
2	(Angola) Recreativo do Libolo	5
3	(Portugal) FC Porto	4
4	(Portugal) Benfica	3

== Awards ==
2011 Supertaça Compal MVP

- (Angola) Felizardo Ambrósio (Primeiro de Agosto)

2011 Supertaça Compal Top Scorer

2011 Supertaça Compal Top Rebounder

2011 Supertaça Compal Top Assists

2011 Supertaça Compal

Clube Desportivo Primeiro de Agosto
1st Title

Most Valuable Player
(Angola) Felizardo Ambrósio

== See also ==
- COMPAL
- Federação Angolana de Basquetebol
- Federação Portuguesa de Basquetebol
