= 2014–15 LPB season =

Liga Portuguesa de Basquetebol
- Season: 2014–15
- Teams: 12
- TV partner(s): Sport TV, Benfica TV

Regular season
- Season MVP: (Portugal) Nuno Marçal
- Relegated: Illiabum Clube; Sampaense Basket

Finals
- Champions: Benfica; 26th title
- Runners-up: Vitória de Guimarães
- Semifinalists: Barcelos Hotel Terço Giv; Ovarense Dolce Vita

Statistical leaders
Points	(Portugal) Nuno Marçal	19.7
Rebounds	(Portugal) Nuno Marçal	13.4
Assists	(Portugal) Miguel Minhava	7.4

The 2014–15 LPB season was the 82nd season of the Liga Portuguesa de Basquetebol (LPB), the highest professional basketball league in Portugal. Three-time defending champions Benfica secured their 26th title after beating Vitória de Guimarães 3–0 in the playoff finals.

== Teams ==
Benfica was the defending champion and secured its 26th league title.

Illiabum Clube, runner-up of the 2013–14 Proliga, promoted to LPB after the resignation of champion Dragon Force.

== Standings ==
Pos	Team	Pld	W	L	PF	PA	PD	Qualification or relegation
1	SL Benfica	22	20	2	2036	1520	+516	Qualification to playoffs
2	Vitória Guimarães	22	18	4	1767	1544	+223	Qualification to playoffs
3	Barcelos Hotel Terço Giv	22	14	8	1806	1723	+83	Qualification to playoffs
4	Ovarense Dolce Vita	22	12	10	1612	1549	+63	Qualification to playoffs
5	Lusitânia	22	12	10	1609	1611	−2	Qualification to playoffs
6	Alges/UAL	22	11	11	1606	1599	+7	Qualification to playoffs
7	CAB Madeira	22	11	11	1773	1808	−35	Qualification to playoffs
8	UD Oliveirense	22	10	12	1640	1751	−111	Qualification to playoffs
9	Maia Basket	22	8	14	1518	1728	−210	
10	Galitos Barreiro Tley	22	6	16	1679	1886	−207	
11	Sampaense Basket	22	5	17	1716	1846	−130	Relegation to Proliga
12	Illiabum Clube	22	5	17	1560	1757	−197	Relegation to Proliga

Source: FPB

== Playoffs ==
Quarterfinals
1	Benfica	3
8	Oliveirense	0
4	Ovarense Dolce Vita	3
5	Lusitânia	0
2	Vitória Guimarães	3
7	CAB Madeira	2
3	Barcelos Hotel Terço Giv	3
6	Alges/UAL	2

Semifinals
1	Benfica	3
4	Ovarense Dolce Vita	2
2	Vitória Guimarães	3
3	Barcelos Hotel Terço Giv	1

Finals
1	Benfica	3
2	Vitória Guimarães	0
