= Reggie Jackson (disambiguation) =

Reggie Jackson (born 1946) is an American former professional baseball player.

Reggie Jackson may also refer to:

- Reggie Jackson (basketball, born 1973), American former basketball forward
- Reggie Jackson (basketball, born 1990), American basketball guard in the National Basketball Association

== See also ==
- Reginald Jackson (disambiguation)
