= Um Bongo =

Juice drink

- Um Bongo logo since 2005
- Product type: Beverage
- Current owner: Sumol + Compal
- Country: United Kingdom
- Introduced: 1983
- Markets: United Kingdom, Portugal
- Website: http://www.umbongo.com/

Um Bongo is a brand of juice drinks produced by Sumol + Compal. It was first produced in 1983 by Nestlé, under the Libby's brand, for consumption in the United Kingdom, and was later licensed for production in Portugal. The trademark is currently held by Sumol + Compal, who produces and sells the drink in both countries. Tropical Um Bongo features a range of fruit juices and purees including Apple, Lemon, Orange, Pineapple, Passion Fruit, Mandarin, Apricot, Guava and Mango.

== History ==
Um Bongo was first created in 1983, originally in Milnthorpe, Cumbria. It was originally sold under the Libby's brand, which at the time belonged to Nestlé who had acquired Libby's fruit juices. Nestlé licensed the Um Bongo brand (still under the Libby's name) to Gerber Foods Soft Drinks Ltd in the UK and Republic of Ireland. In the United Kingdom, Gerber Juice Company Limited packaged the drink until 2017 at their plant in Somerset. Gerber Foods Soft Drinks was dissolved as a company in 2017.

In 1986, Libby's removed all artificial colouring, sweeteners and preservatives from Um Bongo, replacing them with natural colouring. Citric acid was also taken out and replaced with lemon juice. Since 2011, citric acid has again been in use.

Nestlé launched the Um Bongo brand in Portugal in 1988, running a Portuguese version of the TV advertisement, using the slogan Um Bongo, O bom sabor da selva ("Um Bongo, The great flavour of the jungle"). Portuguese company Compal acquired the "Um Bongo" brand from Nestlé by 2003.

Compal merged with Sumol in 2009. The company launched Um Bongo 100% Fruit in 2010 and a themed toy collection named Um Bongo e o bom coração da selva ("Um Bongo and the great heart of the jungle") in 2011.

In 2013, after UK Independence Party MEP Godfrey Bloom made remarks about "Bongo Bongo Land", the Um Bongo website received a surge in traffic, despite the company stating that they had no political affiliations.

=== UK formula change ===
In the late 1990s, parents complained about the amount of sugar and artificial flavourings in many children's fruit drinks, which resulted in new regulations. The Um Bongo formula was changed around 2003 or 2004 to comply with new regulations. Most of the original ingredients were removed, with the drink being re-branded as "Um Bongo-100% juice", containing only bananas, orange and pineapple. In comparison, the original also contained apple, lemon, passion fruit, mandarin, apricot, guava and mango flavours. New packaging for the product was also introduced by 2007, removing much reference to the Congo Basin area.

=== Return of UK Original Um Bongo ===
"Original" 2011 version

From the time Libby's changed the formula, the company received many complaints. This resulted in their deciding to bring back the original Um Bongo formula in 2009. "Classic" Um Bongo was originally renamed "Um Bongo Tropical" and was also repackaged in new plastic 500 ml bottles and placed in the chilled section of supermarkets/consumer shops. Libby's set up a website along with Facebook and YouTube accounts, to help gather additional support.

In May 2011, an "Original" flavour was introduced, with a 200 ml × 3 carton available. The 100% Tropical juice version has since been discontinued and replaced with Original. An "Orange" flavour was released in 2012, and a 1-litre size was sold beginning in 2013.

== Advertising ==
Um Bongo is particularly famous for its long running jingle of "Um Bongo, Um Bongo, they drink it in the Congo", which accompanied animated television advertisements since 1985.

The song was sung by Tony Jackson. The music and lyrics were composed by Andy Blackford. The advert itself was created by Oscar Grillo at Klacto Animations. Their earlier 1984 Kia-Ora advert established a new trend and led to them being commissioned to produce the Um Bongo spot for Leo Burnett.

Despite the confident assurances of the famous jingle, no conclusive evidence has ever been produced that “they drink it in the Congo.”

== Other versions ==
Libby's have created two other types of fruit juice drinks since the 1980s.

Libby's Moonshine, which lasted until 1992, contained more domestic fruits, such as strawberries, raspberries, apples, blackberries and cherries. The animated adverts contained the slogan "Moonshine, looks pretty weird but it tastes just fine".

In 1999, Um Bongo gained a sister drink called "Um Ognob", where "Bongo" was spelled backwards. Um Ognob contained a vitamin-enriched blend of apple, banana, apricot, orange and passion fruit juice. It was discontinued in 2003.
