= Paulo Simão =

Portuguese basketball player

CF Belenenses
- Position: Point guard
- League: ?

Personal information
- Born: April 25, 1976 (age 50) Barreiro
- Listed height: 6 ft 6.7 in (2.00 m)
- Listed weight: 198 lb (90 kg)

Career information
- Playing career: 1994–present

Career history
- 1994–1995: Sporting CP
- 1995–1999: E. Avenida
- 1999–2000: CAB Madeira
- 2001–2003: Portugal Telecom
- 2003–2004: Benfica

Paulo Simão (born April 27, 1976) is a Portuguese basketball player, who plays for CF Belenenses. He has played for the Portugal national basketball team.
