= Pedro Catarino =

Portuguese basketball player (born 1990)

Pedro Filipe Vaz Catarino
No. 21 – Sporting CP
- Position: Point guard
- League: Portuguese Basketball League

Personal information
- Born: 20 October 1990 (age 36) Porto, Portugal
- Listed height: 1.84 m (6 ft 0 in)
- Listed weight: 88 kg (194 lb)

Career history
- 2008-2011: FC Porto
- 2011-2015: Maia BC
- 2015-2016: Vitória SC
- 2016-2017: Maia BC
- 2017-2019: SC Lusitânia
- 2019-: Sporting CP

Pedro Filipe Vaz Catarino (born 20 October 1990) is a Portuguese professional basketball player who plays for Sporting CP.
