= André Cruz (basketball) =

Portuguese basketball player (born 2002)

André Martins Valadas Cruz (born 23 April 2002) is a Portuguese professional basketball player who plays for Sporting CP and for the Portugal men’s national basketball team.

== Early life and career ==
André Cruz was born in Cascais Municipality, in 2002. In 2019, at the age of 17, he signed for Sporting CP in a change of club from Estoril Basket Clube, a club where he played since the youth ranks. After playing for Sporting CP in the 2019–20 season, and after two college basketball experiences in the United States, with the Western Wyoming Mustangs and the Incarnate Word Cardinals, André Cruz returned at the age of 20 to Sporting CP for the 2022–23 season. His senior national team debut was on 22 February 2024 in a game against the Israel men’s national basketball team.
