= Clube Portugal Telecom =

Portuguese professional basketball club

Portugal Telecom
- Leagues: LPB
- Founded: 1996
- Dissolved: 2003
- Location: Lisbon, Portugal
- Team colors: Blue, White, Orange
- Ownership: Portugal Telecom
- Championships: 3 National leagues 2 National cups 1 National supercup

Clube Portugal Telecom, commonly known as Portugal Telecom, was a basketball team based in Lisbon, Portugal. The club was founded in 1996 and was owned by Portugal Telecom, the largest telecommunications service provider in the country. The team won three consecutive league titles between 2000 and 2003, but was dissolved by the company before the start of the 2003–04 season, citing financial reasons.

== History ==
The basketball team was established in 1996. The club played in the country's top flight league since its inception. In their second season, the team reached the Portuguese Basketball League Cup (Taça da Liga) finals, where they lost to Esgueira. In 1997–98 the club debuted at international level and took part in the 1997–98 FIBA EuroCup, finishing 5th out of 6 teams in their group. In the 2000–01 season the team finished the regular season as the best team with an 18–8 record; they reached the finals where they defeated Oliveirense. The team could count on American imports Jason Forrestal, Doug Muse, Marcus Norris and Ron Hale. At international level, Portugal Telecom participated in the 2000–01 FIBA Korać Cup, where they qualified for the Round of 32, where they were elimated as they finished 3rd out of 4 teams in their group.

In the 2001–02 season the repeated as league champions: after finishing the regular season as the top ranked team with a 24–5 record, the team won the finals for the second consecutive season. After being eliminated in the qualifying round of the 2001–02 Euroleague by Spirou Charleroi, Portugal Telecom took part in the 2001–02 FIBA Saporta Cup, where they ended 5th out of 6 teams in the Group A of the regular season phase.

The 2002–03 was the last one for the team. This team they ranked third in the regular season, qualifying for the playoffs, where they ultimately defeated Ovarense in the final series. The team also participated in the 2002–03 FIBA Europe Champions Cup, where they were eliminated during the Regional Qualifying Round finishing 4th out of 6 in the Conference West. Portugal Telecom, which owned the club, disbanded the team after the 2002–03 season.

== Trophies ==
- Portuguese League: 3

2000–01, 2001–02, 2002–03

- Portuguese Cup: 2

2000–01, 2001–02

- Portuguese SuperCup: 1

2003

== Notable players ==
Note: Flags indicate national team eligibility at FIBA-sanctioned events. Players may hold other non-FIBA nationalities not displayed.

Criteria

To appear in this section a player must have either:

- Set a club record or won an individual award while at the club
- Played at least one official international match for their national team at any time
- Played at least one official NBA match at any time.

- (Angola) Jean-Jacques Conceição
- (Ivory Coast) / (France) Marc M'Bahia
- (Portugal) Carlos Andrade
- (Portugal) Diogo Carreira
- (Portugal) Jorge Coelho
- (Portugal) Artur Cruz
- (Portugal) Luís Machado
- (Portugal) João Santos
- (Portugal) Paulo Simão
- (Portugal) / (United States) Heshimu Evans
- (Portugal) / (United States) Mike Richmond
- (Spain) Joffre Lleal
- (United States) Doug Muse
- (United States) Rasul Salahuddin
