= Stara Planina ski resort =

Ski resort in Serbia

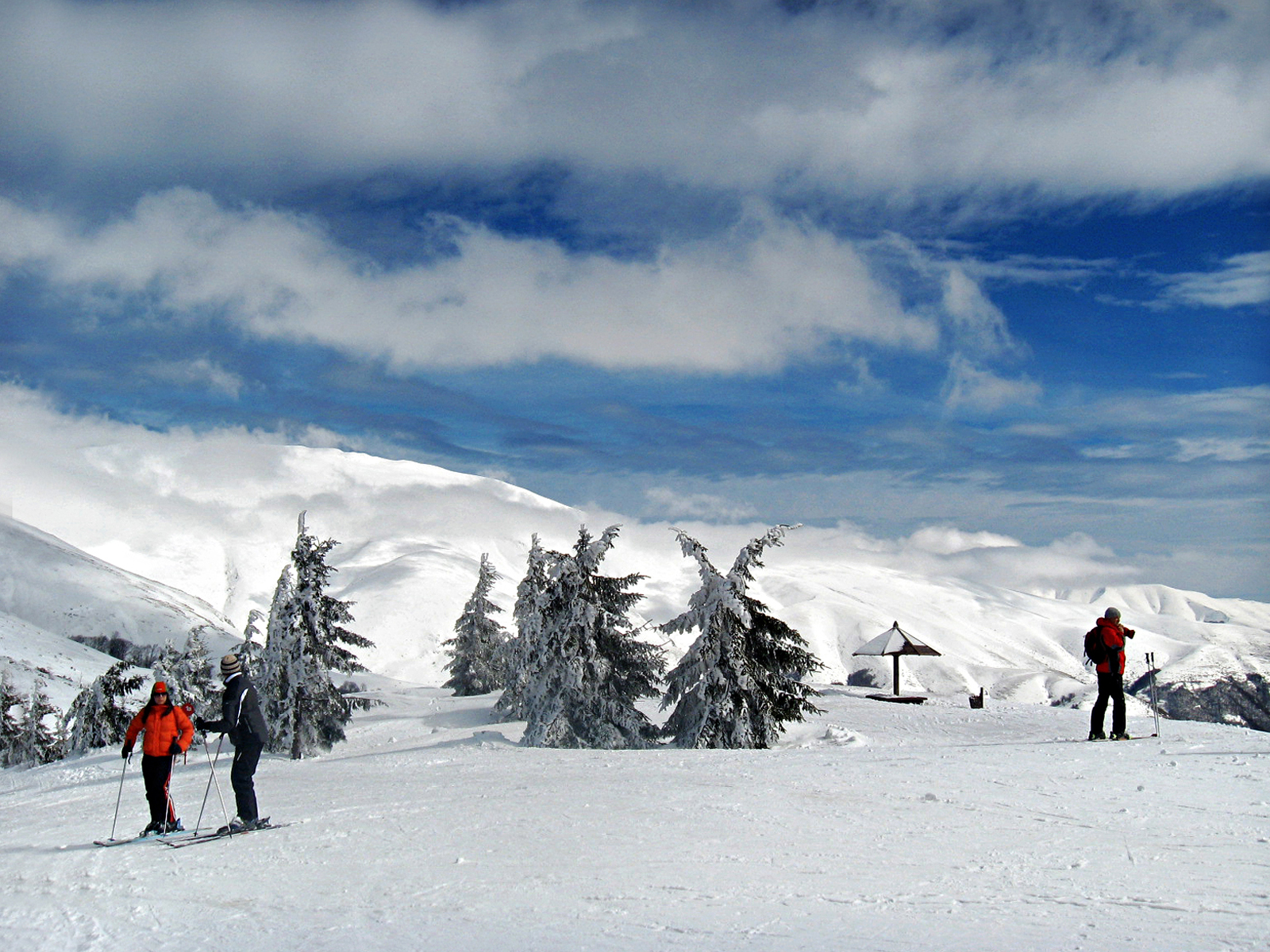
- Stara Planina ski resort

- Location within Serbia
- Location: Stara Planina
- Nearest city: Pirot, Serbia
- Coordinates: 43°22′10″N 22°36′32″E
- Top elevation: 2,169 m (7,116 ft)
- Base elevation: 1,772 m (5,814 ft)
- Skiable area: 13 km (8.1 mi)
- Trails: 6
- Longest run: 1.155 km (0.718 mi)
- Total length: 13 km (8.1 mi)
- Lift system: 5 total (4-passenger gondola, 1 surface lifts)
- Lift capacity: 2,600/hour
- Snowmaking: Yes
- Website: skijalistasrbije.rs/en/about-resort-stara-planina

Stara Planina ski resort (Serbian: Ски-центар Стара планина / Ski-centar Stara planina) is a mountain resort and one of the largest centers of winter tourism in Serbia. Located on the slopes of Stara Planina, it is mainly a skiing destination.

== Features ==
It is located at elevations between 1,100 and 1,900 meters. It has six tracks having 13 km (8.1 mi) in total, with some of them covered by artificial snowing systems, with the total capacity of the about 2,600 skiers per hour. It is equipped with modern chairlifts, with total capacity of 2,400 skiers per hour. All tracks are categorized by the International Ski Federation (FIS).

== Transportation ==
Stara Planina ski resort is located some 55 kilometers from the city of Pirot, 70 kilometers from the city of Niš and international airport Niš Constantine the Great Airport.

== Gallery ==
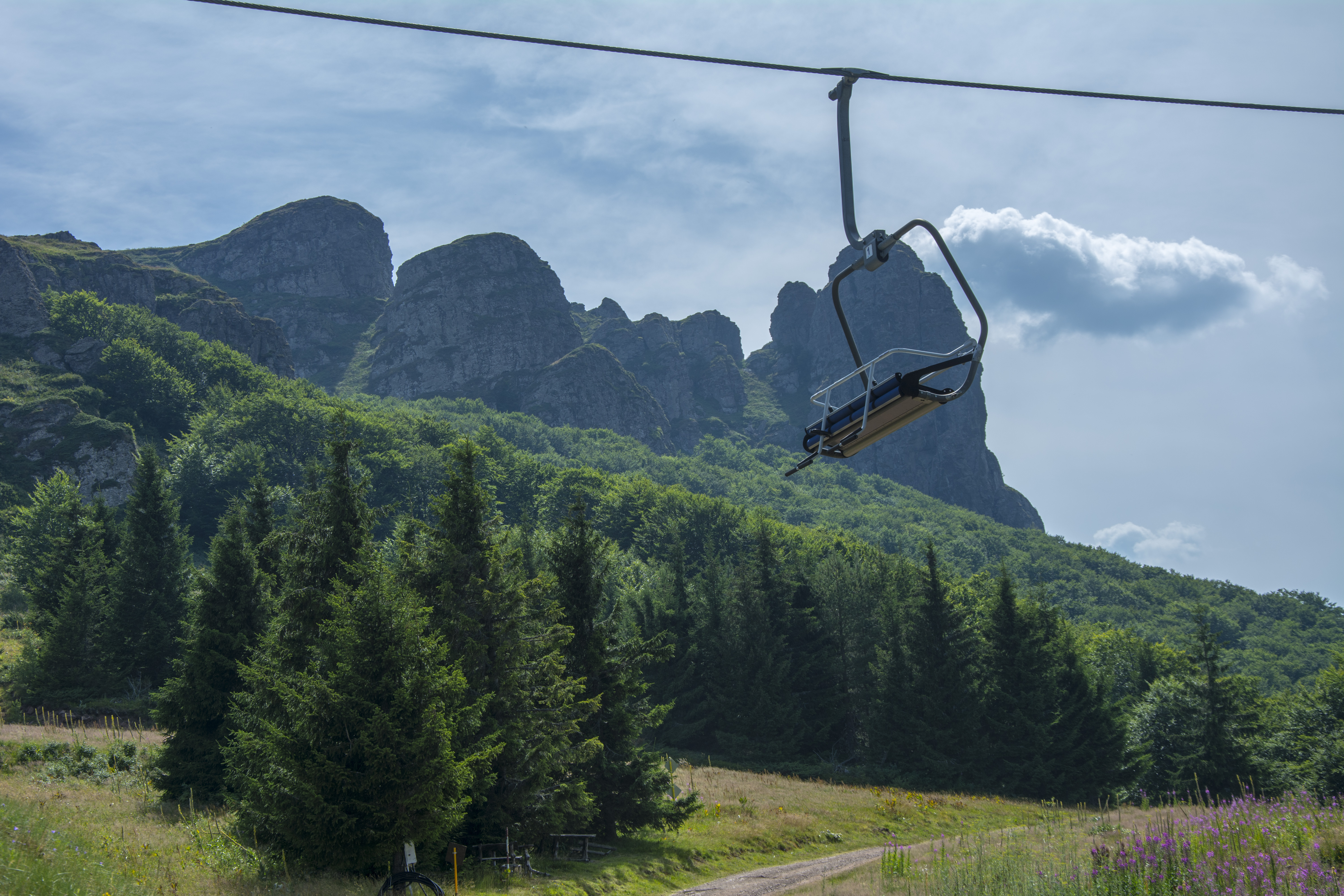
Babin Zub in the summer

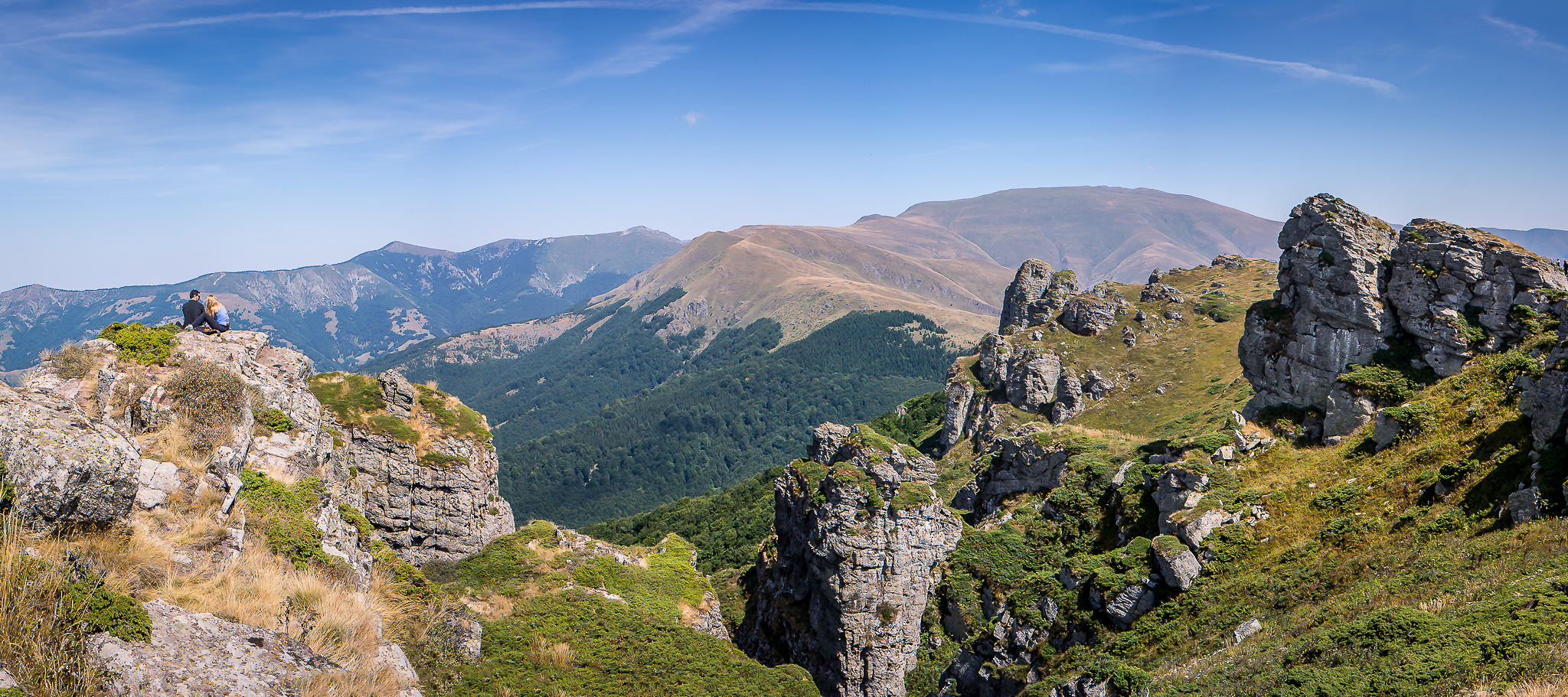
Landscape in the summer

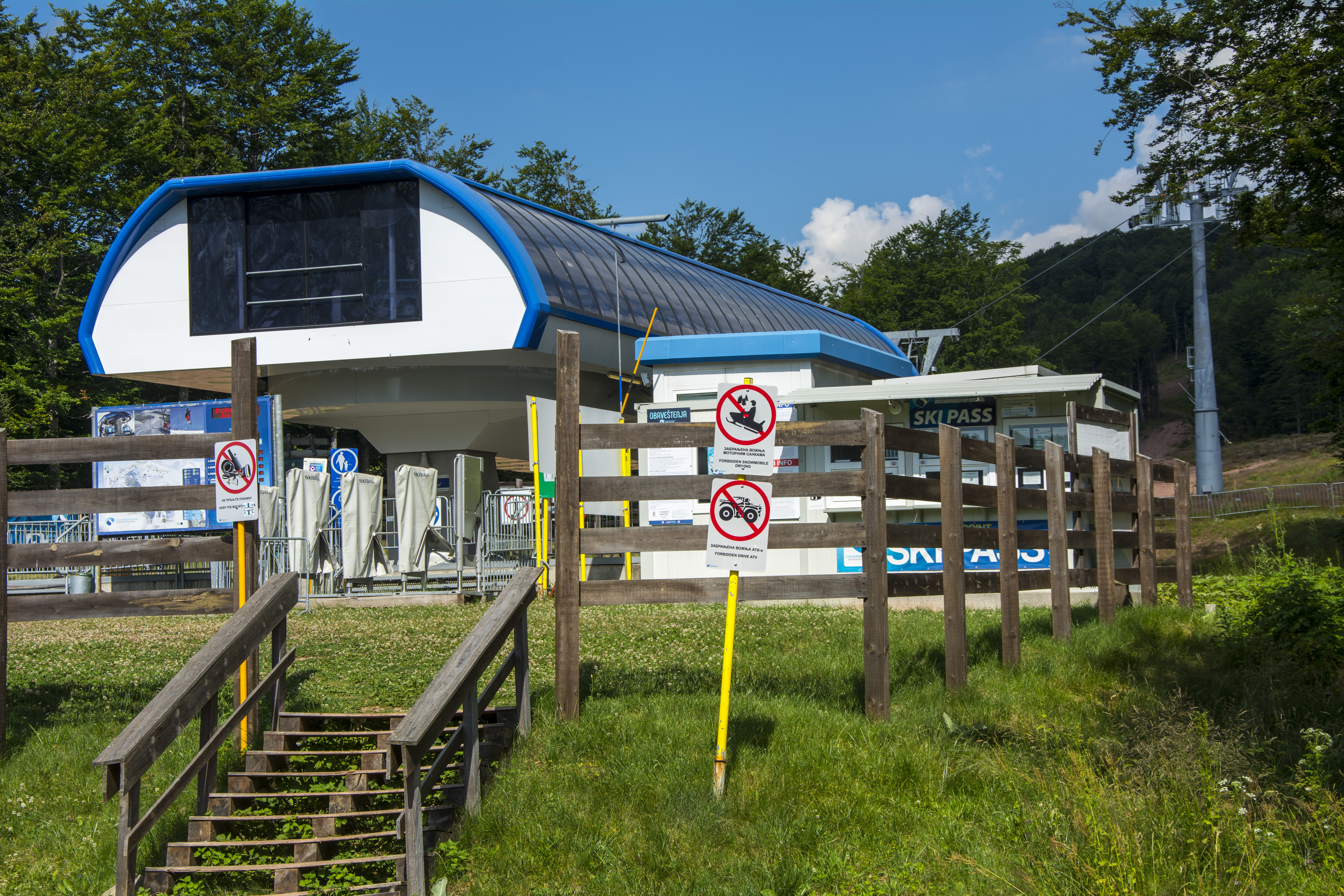
Gondola station

== See also ==
- Tourism in Serbia
