= Jorge Coelho (basketball) =

Portuguese basketball player (born 1978)

CAB Madeira
- Position: Forward-center

Personal information
- Born: 18 October 1978 (age 48) Lisbon
- Listed height: 6 ft 7 in (2.01 m)
- Listed weight: 245 lb (111 kg)

Career information
- Playing career: 1997–present

Career history
- 1997–1999: Seixal
- 1999–2003: Portugal Telecom
- 2003–2006: CF Belenenses
- 2006–2007: FC Porto
- 2007–2008: Palencia Baloncesto
- 2008–2009: Gijón Baloncesto
- 2009–2010: FC Porto
- 2010–present: CAB Madeira

Jorge Miguel Correia Coelho (born 18 October 1978) is a Portuguese former basketball player. He played at his home country for Portugal Telecom (1999/2000-2002-2003), CF Belenenses (2003/2004-2005/2006) and FC Porto (2006/2007). Coelho was also a member of the Portuguese squad at EuroBasket 2007 finals.
