= Portuguese Basketball Champions Tournament =

Portuguese Basketball Champions Tournament Cup or Torneio dos Campeões was a competition for Portuguese teams that play in the Portuguese Basketball League (LCB).

== Portuguese Champions Tournament Winners ==
Year	Final
Year	Champion	Score	Runner-Up
2002/03	Aveiro Basket	84 - 77	FC Porto
2003/04	Casino Ginasio	80 - 77	Oliveirense
2004/05	Ovarense	82 - 74	C.A. Queluz
2005/06	FC Porto	74 - 65	Ovarense
2006/07	Ovarense (2)	69 - 57	Benfica
2007/08	Ovarense (3)	82 - 61	CF Belenenses
