= Sporting CP (basketball) =

Portuguese professional basketball team

- Leagues: Liga Portuguesa de Basquetebol; Europe Cup
- Founded: 1927; 99 years ago
- Arena: Pavilhão João Rocha
- Capacity: 3,000
- Location: Lisbon, Portugal
- Team colours: Green, White, Black
- President: Frederico Varandas
- Head coach: Luís Magalhães
- Championships: 9 Portuguese Leagues; 9 Portuguese Cups; 2 Portuguese Supercups; 3 Portuguese League Cups
- Website: sporting.pt
| Home | Away |

Sporting Clube de Portugal (Portuguese pronunciation: [sɨˈpɔɾtĩ ˈkluβɨ ðɨ puɾtuˈɣal]), otherwise referred to as Sporting CP, is a professional basketball team based in Lisbon, Portugal.

The team competes in the LPB and plays its home matches at Pavilhão João Rocha.

== History ==
Basketball was introduced at Sporting Clube de Portugal in 1927. However, the early decades of this sport were not easy, as it was very difficult to find enough players to build a team and the club did not have its own facilities. During this period, a women's team was also created, but it only competed during the 1937/1938 season before being closed down. It was only in the 1945/1946 season that the club decided to invest properly in basketball, building its own court and making its coaching staff professional. This new reality led the club to its first national titles.

Despite periods marked by several national titles won by the men's team and various attempts to maintain the women's team, the club entered the 1990s in serious financial crisis. To balance the accounts, in 1995, the president Santana Lopes, held a referendum among the club's members to choose between basketball and handball, which of them should be discontinued and which would be maintained. The members chose to keep handball in the club, so basketball was discontinued.

In March of 2012, it was announced that basketball would return to Sporting CP in the following season (2012/13), with independent management through the self-sustaining Associação de Basquetebol SCP.The return took place through the youth teams and the women's team. Four years later, in 2016, the president Bruno de Carvalho announced that basketball was recognised as an official sport of the club again.

In 2018, the president Frederico Varandas announced the creation of a men's team, which would compete directly in the LPB from the 2019/2020 season. In November 2018, the LPB held a vote with all clubs, which unanimously accepted the return of Sporting CP basketball team to the competition.

To restore the club’s basketball team, Luís Magalhães, who had won 30 titles with Portuguese and Angolan clubs, as well as five titles with the Angola men's national basketball team, and was already retired, accepted the challenge and was appointed as head coach. He coached the club until the 2021/2022 season, winning six titles, before retiring once again. In 2024/2025, he would return to Sporting, staying for two seasons and winning two more titles, before retiring for real.

Among the newly formed squad, the small forward Travante Williams stood out. He was the key player for the then back-to-back Portuguese champions, UD Oliveirense. By winning the 2020/2021 LPB with Sporting CP, he would go on to become a three-time Portuguese champion in a row. He played for four seasons at Sporting CP, winning eight titles, and had such a significant impact on Portuguese basketball that he obtained Portuguese citizenship and went on to represent the Portugal men's national basketball team.

Although the first season of the team's resurgence (2019/2020) was not completed due to the Covid-19 pandemic, and therefore no trophies were awarded, the positive impact was immediate. In the first two full seasons, Sporting CP won six titles, winning every possible domestic title at least once.

The 2020/2021 season began with the final four of the previous season’s Portuguese Basketball Cup. A 87-76 victory over FC Porto marked the team’s first trophy since its return to the men’s senior division in 2019.

Since Sporting CP were top of the league when the 2019/2020 season was suspended, the club was selected to take part in the 2020/2021 Basketball Champions League. They secured their first-ever win in international competitions by beating Fribourg Olympic Basket 84–78 in the qualifying semi-finals. After losing to KK Igokea in the qualifying final, the club continued its European campaign in the FIBA Europe Cup, where it failed to win any of its group stage matches.

However, the season’s greatest achievement was the LPB title, 39 years after the last one. Sporting CP became champions in a final once again against FC Porto, decided over five games. Having finished the regular season in first place, they clinched the title in front of their fans in a game that ended 86–85.

The 2021/2022 season began with the club’s first appearance and win in the Portuguese Basketball Super Cup, against Imortal, by 74–64. At domestic level, Sporting CP also secured its first-ever Hugo dos Santos Cup, beating S.L. Benfica in the final by 66–64.

During this season, but now as national champions, the club attempted to qualify for the Basketball Champions League once again but lost in the quarter-finals of the qualifying round to BC Kalev.

As a result, it once again competed in the FIBA Europe Cup. In the first round of this competition, Sporting CP not only secured its first-ever victory in this competition, beating Belfius Mons-Hainaut by 75–65, but also won five of its six group matches, which allowed it to advance to the next round in first place with 10 points. In the second phase, Sporting CP and SL Benfica were drawn in the same group, resulting in the first-ever match between Portuguese teams in European competitions. Sporting CP won both matches (89–72 at home and 72–64 away). Sporting CP finished this second phase in second place, with 10 points, just behind Oradea, qualifying for the quarter-finals, and becoming the first Portuguese team ever to achieve this stage. Having lost both matches in this phase, the team was eliminated by Bahçeşehir Koleji S.K., who would go on to win this competition. Nevertheless, this turned out to be the club’s best European campaign in its history.

== Facilities ==
=== Pavilhão João Rocha ===
Pavilhão João Rocha is a multi-sports arena located in Lisbon. Located next to the Estádio José Alvalade, it is the home of Sporting CP indoor sports teams and was named after former club president João Rocha.

== Honours ==
=== Domestic Competitions ===
- LPB: 9

1953/1954, 1955/1956, 1959/1960, 1968/1969, 1975/1976, 1977/1978, 1980/1981, 1981/1982, 2020/2021

- Campeonato Metropolitano: 1

1968/1969

- Portuguese Basketball Cup: 9

1954/1955, 1974/1975, 1975/1976, 1977/1978, 1979/1980, 2019/2020, 2020/2021, 2021/2022, 2025/2026

- Portuguese Basketball Super Cup: 2

2021, 2022

- Taça Hugo dos Santos: 3

2021/2022, 2022/2023, 2025/2026

== Current roster ==
Sporting CP roster
Players
Coaches

| Pos. | No. | Nat. | Name | Ht. | Wt. | Age |
|---|---|---|---|---|---|---|
| F | 0 | (United States) | Johns Jr., Brandon | 2.03 m (6 ft 8 in) | 109 kg (240 lb) | 26 – 14 December 1999 |
| F | 1 | (Mozambique) | Razaque, Uwais | 2.01 m (6 ft 7 in) | 86 kg (190 lb) | 22 – 19 March 2004 |
| F | 2 | (United States) | Bowman, Malik | 2.03 m (6 ft 8 in) | 103 kg (227 lb) | 22 – 14 May 2004 |
| F | 3 | (United States) | Harden-Hayes, Maleeck | 2.01 m (6 ft 7 in) | 91 kg (201 lb) | 25 – 23 February 2001 |
| G | 4 | (Portugal) | Carreia, Miguel | 1.88 m (6 ft 2 in) | 74 kg (163 lb) | 26 – 29 September 2000 |
| C | 5 | (Portugal) | Palhares, Rui | 2.01 m (6 ft 7 in) | 103 kg (227 lb) | 25 – 24 December 2000 |
| PG | 6 | (Portugal) | Amarante, Francisco | 1.93 m (6 ft 4 in) | 88 kg (194 lb) | 26 – 24 March 2000 |
| PF | 7 | (United States) | Robinson, Robby | 2.03 m (6 ft 8 in) | 109 kg (240 lb) | 27 – 7 August 1999 |
| PG | 9 | (Portugal) | Ventura, Diogo | 1.94 m (6 ft 4 in) | 82 kg (181 lb) | 32 – 24 June 1994 |
| PF | 13 | (Angola) | Fernandes, João | 2.00 m (6 ft 7 in) | 100 kg (220 lb) | 33 – 1 December 1992 |
| C | 18 | (Portugal) | Cherepenko, Dinis | 2.07 m (6 ft 9 in) | 108 kg (238 lb) | 20 – 8 January 2006 |
| F | 21 | (Portugal) | Cruz, André | 2.01 m (6 ft 7 in) | 95 kg (209 lb) | 24 – 23 April 2002 |
| SG | 24 | (United States) | Morgan, Malik | 1.93 m (6 ft 4 in) | 93 kg (205 lb) | 32 – 31 January 1994 |

Head coach

- Luís Magalhães

Assistant coach(es)

- Ivan Kostourkov
- Sérgio Ramos
- Frederico Pinto
- José Carlos Paiva

Legend

- (C) Team captain
- Injured

- Roster
Updated: September 10, 2024

== Awards ==
Awards received by players while playing for the club

Liga Betclic Awards: Young Player of the Year

- André Cruz - 2023/2024, 2024/2025

Liga Betclic Awards: Best Defender

- Tanner Oblid - 2021/2022
- Travante Williams - 2022/2023

Liga Betclic Awards: Assist Leader

- Francisco Amiel - 2021/2022

Liga Betclic Awards: Steals Leader

- Tanner Oblid - 2021/2022
