= Curtis Terry =

American basketball player (born 1985)

Personal information
- Born: August 27, 1985 (age 41) Tacoma, Washington, U.S.
- Listed height: 196 cm (6 ft 5 in)
- Listed weight: 93 kg (205 lb)

Career information
- High school: Curtis (University Place, Washington)
- College: UNLV (2004–2008)
- NBA draft: 2008: undrafted
- Playing career: 2008–2012
- Position: Shooting guard / small forward
- Number: 31
- Coaching career: 2013–present

Career history

Playing
- 2008–2009: Los Angeles D-Fenders
- 2009–2010: Petro Atletico de Luanda
- 2010: Texas Legends
- 2010–2011: ITU Istanbul
- 2011–2012: Akita Northern Happinets
- 2012: Associacao Academica de Coimbra

Coaching
- 2013–2014: Liberty HS

Curtis Eugene Raymond Terry (born August 27, 1985) is an American former professional basketball player. On November 1, 2010, he was selected by the Texas Legends in the seventh round of the 2010 NBA Development League Draft. His playing career continued until 2012, and the next year he began a coaching career which he continues today.

== College statistics ==
Year	Team	GP	GS	MPG	FG%	3P%	FT%	RPG	APG	SPG	BPG	PPG
2004–05	UNLV	31	0	12.2	.357	.328	.806	1.71	0.71	0.16	0.00	3.71
2005–06	UNLV	30	25	28.2	.397	.342	.800	3.00	2.30	0.73	0.07	7.40
2006–07	UNLV	37	1	19.1	.357	.333	.684	1.89	1.65	0.86	0.03	4.54
2007–08	UNLV	35	32	32.4	.415	.372	.737	3.26	4.83	1.09	0.20	11.09
Career		113	58	23.0	.391	.350	.745	2.46	2.41	0.73	0.08	6.71

=== NCAA Awards & Honors ===
- Mountain West All-Conference Third Team (Coaches) – 2008
- Mountain West All-Tournament Team – 2008

== Career statistics ==
Legend
GP	Games played	GS	Games started	MPG	Minutes per game
FG%	Field goal percentage	3P%	3-point field goal percentage	FT%	Free throw percentage
RPG	Rebounds per game	APG	Assists per game	SPG	Steals per game
BPG	Blocks per game	PPG	Points per game	**Bold**	Career high

=== Regular season ===
Year	Team	GP	GS	MPG	FG%	3P%	FT%	RPG	APG	SPG	BPG	PPG
2008–09	SBL	16	0	13.3	.322	.267	.600	1.50	0.69	0.06	0.00	3.06
2010–11	TEX	1	1	37.2	.300	.286	.625	4.00	2.00	1.00	0.00	13.00
2010–11	ITU	8		36.1	.412	.345	.628	5.5	1.8	1.0	0.1	19.3
2011–12	Akita	14	9	24.0	.373	.345	.800	3.5	2.4	0.9	0.2	11.3
2011–12	Academica Coimbra	4	3	24.1	.472	.348	.714	2.00	2.25	0.75	0.00	11.75
