= Ricardo Rodrigues =

Portuguese footballer

Personal information
- Full name: Ricardo Jorge da Silva Nogueira Rodrigues
- Date of birth: 28 June 1995 (age 31)
- Place of birth: Paredes, Portugal
- Height: 1.73 m (5 ft 8 in)
- Position: Forward

Team information
- Current team: Paredes

Youth career
- 2007–2013: Nun'Álvares
- 2013–2014: Aves

Senior career*
Years	Team	Apps	(Gls)
2014–2017	Desportivo Aves B	32	(24)
2014–2020	Desportivo Aves	11	(0)
2014–2015	→ AD Oliveirense (loan)	18	(2)
2015–2016	→ Brito SC (loan)	30	(13)
2017–2018	→ Canelas 2010 (loan)	12	(2)
2018	→ Mafra (loan)	16	(4)
2020	Estoril	4	(0)
2020–2024	Alverca	83	(33)
2024–	Paredes	0	(0)
- * Club domestic league appearances and goals as of 17:44, 14 January 2024 (UTC)

Ricardo Jorge da Silva Nogueira Rodrigues (born 28 June 1995) is a Portuguese professional footballer who plays as a forward or winger for Campeonato de Portugal club Paredes.

== Career ==
On 16 January 2020, Rodrigues joined LigaPro club G.D. Estoril Praia. He then signed a pre-contract with F.C. Alverca on 20 May 2020, valid from the 2020–21 season.

On 19 January 2024, Rodrigues left Liga 3 club Alverca and joined Campeonato de Portugal side Paredes.
