= Nuno Marçal =

Portuguese basketball player

Maia
- Position: Power forward

Personal information
- Born: November 14, 1975 (age 51) Campanhã, Portugal
- Listed height: 2.05 m (6 ft 9 in)
- Listed weight: 99 kg (218 lb)

Career information
- Playing career: 1992–2018

Career history
- 1992–1999: Porto
- 1999–2000: Fuenlabrada
- 2000–2003: Porto
- 2003–2004: Oliveirense
- 2004–2005: CB Murcia
- 2005–2006: Ciudad de Huelva
- 2006–2012: Porto
- 2012–2018: Maia Basket

Career highlights
- LPB Most Valuable Player (2015); LPB scoring leader (2015); LPB rebounding leader (2015)

Nuno Ricardo Oliveira Marçal (born 14 November 1975 in Campanhã) is a retired Portuguese basketball player. He played as a forward.

== Professional career ==
He first played at FC Porto, from 1992/93 to 1998/99, moving then to Fuenlabrada, in Spain, for 1999/00. He returned to FC Porto, where he played from 2000/01 to 2002/03. Marçal was assigned to Oliveirense, for 2003/04, moving to Spain after that, where he went to represent Murcia (2004/05) and Huelva (2005/06). Marçal is now playing again at FC Porto, since 2006/07.

One of the best Portuguese basketball players, he is a regular at Portugal, counting currently 66 caps. He missed the EuroBasket 2007, due to an injury. He played again at the EuroBasket 2009 qualifiers.

Starting from 2012, Marçal started playing with Maia Basket Clube. In the 2014–15 season, Marçal was named the LPB Most Valuable Player.
