= Ginásio C.F. (basketball) =

Basketball team in Figueira da Foz, Portugal

- Leagues: Proliga
- Arena: Pavilhão Galamba Marques
- Location: Figueira da Foz, Portugal
- Championships: 1 (1977)
Home	Away	Third

Ginásio C.F. is a professional basketball team based in Figueira da Foz, Portugal. It plays in the second-tier Proliga. In 1977, it won the first-tier LPB.

== Achievements ==
- Liga Portuguesa de Basquetebol: 1 (1976/77)
- Portuguese Basketball Cup: 1 (1976/77)
- Portuguese Basketball Champions Tournament: 1 (2003/04)
- II Divisão Basquetebol: 3 (1968/69, 1987/88, 1991/92)

== Notable players ==
Note: Flags indicate national team eligibility at FIBA-sanctioned events. Players may hold other non-FIBA nationalities not displayed.

Criteria

To appear in this section a player must have either:

- Set a club record or won an individual award while at the club
- Played at least one official international match for their national team at any time
- Played at least one official NBA match at any time.

- (Cape Verde) Rodrigo Mascarenhas
