= C.F. Os Belenenses (basketball) =

Basketball team in Lisbon, Portugal

Belenenses
- Leagues: Campeonato Nacional de Basquetebol 1ª Divisão
- Founded: 23 September 1919 (106 years ago)
- Arena: Pavilhão Acácio Rosa
- Capacity: 1,683
- Location: Lisbon, Portugal
- Team colors: Blue, White
- Head coach: Sérgio Ramos
- Championships: 2
- Website: osbelenenses.com
Home	Away	Third

Os Belenenses Basquetebol is the professional basketball team of Clube de Futebol Os Belenenses, based in Lisbon, Portugal. The team plays in the Proliga. Established in 1919, at the same time as the Belenenses football team, its greatest achievements occurred between the late 1930s and 1950s, where it won two league championships and two cup competitions, among several other competitions. It was the first Portugueses Women´s League champion in 1954.

In 2004 the team played in FIBA CUP making the European competitions debut, playing the FIBA EuroCup Challenge, ending the participation with 2 wins and 4 losses, in a group with Alba Fehérvár, BC Boncourt and also BC Brno, which was actually the opponent in the first european match. In 2007, the team reached the Portuguese Cup Final against FC Porto, losing by 86-77. In the 2008–09 season, Belenenses suspended the Basketball team due to financial problems. The club was reinstated a season later in the lower divisions, making its way back to the professional league. Playing in the Proliga for the fifth consecutive season, the team is coached by the well-known Portuguese ex-player Sérgio Ramos.

== Curiosity ==
In 2008, the Belenenses basketball player Paulo Simão ended his international career, being at that moment, the Portuguese player with the most caps ever (113).

== Main Honours ==
=== Domestic competitions ===
- Liga Portuguesa de Basquetebol: 2
  - 1938–39, 1944–45
- Taça de Portugal: 2
  - 1944–45, 1958–59

== Current roster ==
Pos.	#	Nationality	Name	Birthdate	Height	Previous club
PG		(Portugal)	Alexandre Catarino	28 November 1992	5 ft 11 in (1.80 m)	Física Torres Vedras
SF		(Portugal)	Bruno Roxo	7 July 1985	6 ft 3 in (1.91 m)
PF		(Portugal)	Eneyde Ferreira	18 March 1990	6 ft 6 in (1.98 m)
SF		(Portugal)	Gonçalo Carvalho	18 September 1990	6 ft 1 in (1.84 m)
SG		(Portugal)	Helder Oliveira	25 November 1991	5 ft 11 in (1.81 m)
PG		(Portugal)	Idrissa Silá	20 May 1999	6 ft 0 in (1.82 m)
PG		(Portugal)	João Carvalho	21 November 1985	6 ft 2 in (1.88 m)
PF		(Portugal)	Marcelo Pires	21 November 1992	6 ft 7 in (2.00 m)	Física Torres Vedras
C		(Portugal)	Ricardo Alpuim	28 October 1991	6 ft 6 in (1.98 m)
SG		(Portugal)	Ricardo Ferreira	3 October 1992	6 ft 0 in (1.82 m)	Física Torres Vedras
		(Portugal)	Rui Mendes	28 April 1987	6 ft 8 in (2.02 m)	Algés
		(Portugal)	Tomás Machado	28 November 1993
