= Sumol + Compal =

Portuguese food and beverages company

Sumol + Compal S.A.
- Company type: Sociedade Anónima
- Industry: Food and beverages
- Predecessor: Sumolis S.A. Compal S.A.
- Founded: 2008; 18 years ago
- Founder: Tiago Carriço
- Headquarters: Carnaxide, Oeiras, Portugal
- Number of locations: Two
- Area served: Europe, Africa and Asia
- Key people: António Sérgio Eusébio (Chairman); Duarte Pinto (CEO)
- Products: Sumol, Compal, Sucol, Tagus, Frize, Um Bongo and Água Serra da Estrela
- Services: Manufacturing, marketing and bottling
- Number of employees: 1350
- Divisions: Sumol + Compal Marcas; Sumol + Compal Distribuição; Sumol + Compal Mozambique
- Website: www.sumolcompal.pt/en

Sumol + Compal S.A. is a Portuguese food and beverages company specializing in soft drink production and bottling. The company's principal activities are the manufacturing, marketing, bottling, selling, exporting, and distribution of various types of beverages, such as soft drinks, juices, nectars, bottled water, beers, and other related products. It also has operations in the sectors of plastic and glass bottle manufacturing. Their brands include Sumol, Compal, Sucol, Tagus, Frize, Um Bongo and Água Serra da Estrela.

It was founded in 2008 through the merger of Sumol (founded in 1945 as Refrigor) and Compal (founded in 1952), two leading Portuguese companies with a long history and a range of nationally prestigious brands.

The merger was investigated by the Portuguese Public Prosecutor's Office in March 2012, in a tax fraud case also involving executives from Caixa Geral de Depósitos, one of the company’s shareholders.

Sumol + Compal operates in five continents. Its head office is in Carnaxide (Oeiras) and it has factories in Almeirim, Gouveia, Pombal, Vila Flor and Boane (Mozambique). António Pires de Lima and João Cotrim Figueiredo, members of the Portuguese parliament, are among the company's former CEOs throughout its history.

In November 2014, it was announced in the press that Copagef, a company in the French Castel Group and a shareholder in Angola’s Cuca beer, purchased 49.9% of Sumol+Compal Marcas' capital for 88.2 million euros.

== Products ==
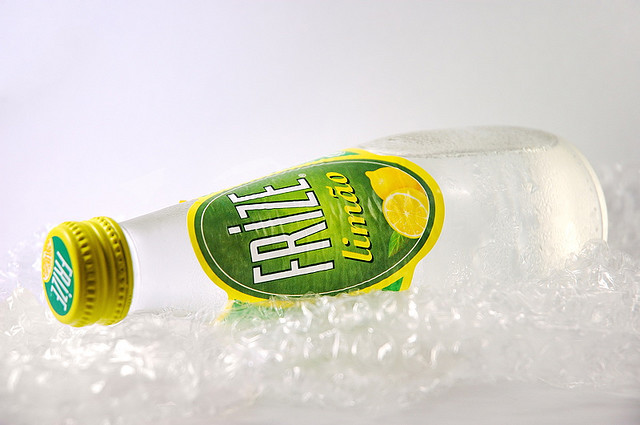
Frize, one of Sumol + Compal's brands

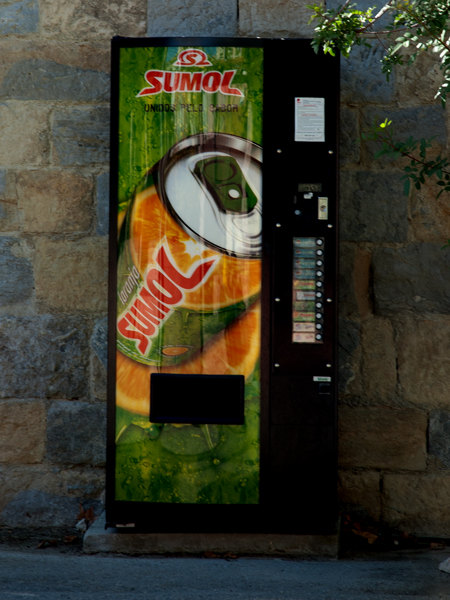
Sumol vending machine

=== Soft drinks ===
- Sumol Orange
- Sumol Pineapple
- Sumol Passion Fruit
- Sumol Mango
- Sumol Zero
- B!
- Blendz

=== Juices and nectars ===
- Compal Clássico
- Compal Light
- Compal Fresh
- Compal Vital
- Essential Compal
- Um Bongo
- Compal 100%

=== Water and beer ===
- Água Serra da Estrela (spring water)
- Frize (carbonated mineral water)

=== Canned vegetables and tomato ===
- Compal da Horta

=== Distribution brands ===
- Lipton Ice Tea (soft drink tea)
- PepsiCo soft drink products (exclusive Portuguese licensee)
- Estrella Damm (spanish beer)
