= Portuguese Basketball Cup =

Top-tier level men's professional national club basketball cup competition in Portugal

The Portuguese Basketball Cup (Portuguese: Taça de Portugal de Basquetebol) is the top-tier level men's professional national club basketball cup competition in Portugal. It is organized by the Portuguese Basketball Federation (Federação Portuguesa de Basquetebol).

== Finals ==
Season	Final		
Season	Winners	Result	Runners-up
1943–44	Atlético CP	42–26	CF Belenenses
1944–45	CF Belenenses	31–27	Vasco da Gama FC
1945–46	Benfica	33–32	CF Belenenses
1946–47	Benfica (2)	42–25	Vasco da Gama FC
1947–48	Vasco da Gama FC	37–35	Benfica
1953–54	Atlético CP (2)	53–35	Conimbricense
1954–55	Sporting CP	51–49 / 73–39	Barreirense
1956–57	Barreirense	58–54	CF Belenenses
1957–58	Académica de Coimbra	49–40	Barreirense
1958–59	CF Belenenses (2)	44–42	Benfica
1959–60	Barreirense (2)	48–42	Benfica
1960–61	Benfica (3)	79–45	Académica de Coimbra
1961–62	Sporting Lourenço Marques	46–30	Barreirense
1962–63	Barreirense (3)	48–47	Benfica
1963–64	Benfica (4)	63–44	Vasco da Gama FC
1964–65	Benfica (5)	51–41	Sporting CP
1965–66	Benfica (6)	44–37	Sporting CP
1966–67	Académica de Coimbra (2)	52–44	Vasco da Gama FC
1967–68	Benfica (7)	79–74	Académica de Coimbra
1968–69	Benfica (8)	79–68	Banco Pinto Magalhães
1969–70	Benfica (9)	75–68	Banco Pinto Magalhães
1970–71	Académica de Coimbra (3)	83–71	Porto
1971–72	Benfica (10)	91–70	Académica de Coimbra
1972–73	Benfica (11)	73–69	Porto
1973–74	Benfica (12)	102–84	Sporting CP
1974–75	Sporting CP (2)	78–75	Benfica
1975–76	Sporting CP (3)	104–64	Porto
1976–77	Ginásio	82–72	Porto
1977–78	Sporting CP (4)	87–83	Sangalhos
1978–79	Porto	93–86	Sporting CP
1979–80	Sporting CP (5)	93–59	Sangalhos
1980–81	Benfica (13)	90–86	Porto
1981–82	Barreirense (4)	85–78	Atlético CP
1982–83	C.A. Queluz	86–85	Benfica
1983–84	Barreirense (5)	109–76	Conimbricense
1984–85	Barreirense (6)	96–82	Benfica
1985–86	Porto (2)	119–76	Estrelas da Avenida
1986–87	Porto (3)	101–100	Benfica
1987–88	Porto (4)	90–77	Benfica
1988–89	Ovarense	81–73	Illiabum
1989–90	Ovarense (2)	78–73	Benfica
1990–91	Porto (5)	89–74	Ovarense
1991–92	Benfica (14)	84–76	Illiabum
1992–93	Benfica (15)	91–86	Ovarense
1993–94	Benfica (16)	86–64	Ovarense
1994–95	Benfica (17)	80–79	Porto
1995–96	Benfica (18)	75–74	Oliveirense
1996–97	Porto (6)	95–73	Ovarense
1997–98	Estrelas da Avenida	87–86	Benfica
1998–99	Porto (7)	67–60	Ovarense
1999–2000	Porto (8)	83–76	Ovarense
2000–01	Portugal Telecom	102–88	Ovarense
2001–02	Portugal Telecom (2)	91–85	Oliveirense
2002–03	Oliveirense	75–65	CAB Madeira
2003–04	Porto (9)	97–88	Ovarense
2004–05	C.A. Queluz (2)	71–62	Ovarense
2005–06	Porto (10)	95–84	Benfica
2006–07	Porto (11)	86–77	CF Belenenses
2007–08	Vitória de Guimarães	65–64	Porto
2008–09	Ovarense (3)	92–87	AD Vagos
2009–10	Porto (12)	71–70	Ovarense
2010–11	CAB Madeira	64–62	CB Penafiel
2011–12	Porto (13)	58–47	Académica de Coimbra
2012–13	Vitória de Guimarães (2)	100–81	Benfica
2013–14	Benfica (19)	74–52	Galitos
2014–15	Benfica (20)	88–87 (2 OT)	Barcelos
2015–16	Benfica (21)	103–51	Ovarense
2016–17	Benfica (22)	85–67	CAB Madeira
2017–18	Illiabum	91–83	Benfica
2018–19	Porto (14)	83–80	Oliveirense
2019–20	Sporting CP (6)	87–78	Porto
2020–21	Sporting CP (7)	83–59	Imortal
2021–22	Sporting CP (8)	79–75	Benfica
2022–23	Benfica (23)	75–74	Imortal
2023–24	Porto (15)	81–78	Benfica
2024–25	Porto (16)	94–73	Sporting CP
2025–26	Sporting CP (9)	86–84	Porto

== Performance by club ==
Team	Won	Runners-up	Years won	Years runner-up
Benfica	23	16	1946, 1947, 1961, 1964, 1965, 1966, 1968, 1969, 1970, 1972, 1973, 1974, 1981, 1992, 1993, 1994, 1995, 1996, 2014, 2015, 2016, 2017, 2023	1948, 1959, 1960, 1963, 1975, 1983, 1985, 1987, 1988, 1990, 1998, 2006, 2013, 2018, 2022, 2024
Porto	16	9	1979, 1986, 1987, 1988, 1991, 1997, 1999, 2000, 2004, 2006, 2007, 2010, 2012, 2019, 2024, 2025	1971, 1973, 1976, 1977, 1981, 1995, 2008, 2020, 2026
Sporting CP	9	5	1955, 1975, 1976, 1978, 1980, 2020, 2021, 2022, 2026	1965, 1966, 1974, 1979, 2025
Barreirense	6	3	1957, 1960, 1963, 1982, 1984, 1985	1955, 1958, 1962
Ovarense	3	11	1989, 1990, 2009	1991, 1993, 1994, 1997, 1999, 2000, 2001, 2004, 2005, 2010, 2016
Académica de Coimbra	3	4	1958, 1967, 1971	1961, 1968, 1972, 2012
CF Belenenses	2	4	1945, 1959	1944, 1946, 1957, 2007
Atlético CP	2	1	1944, 1954	1982
Portugal Telecom	2	0	2001, 2002	–
C.A. Queluz	2	0	1983, 2005	–
Vitória de Guimarães	2	0	2008, 2013	–
Vasco da Gama	1	4	1948	1945, 1947, 1964, 1967
Oliveirense	1	3	2003	1996, 2002, 2019
CAB Madeira	1	2	2011	2003, 2017
Illiabum	1	2	2018	1989, 1992
Estrelas Avenida	1	1	1998	1986
Sporting Lourenço Marques (MOZ)	1	0	1962	–
Ginásio	1	0	1977	–
Banco Pinto Magalhães	0	2	–	1969, 1970
Sangalhos	0	2	–	1978, 1980
Conimbricence	0	2	–	1954, 1984
Imortal	0	2	–	2021, 2023
AD Vagos	0	1	–	2009
CB Penafiel	0	1	–	2011
Galitos	0	1	–	2014
Barcelos	0	1	–	2015

== See also ==
- Portuguese Basketball League Cup
- António Pratas Trophy
- Portuguese Basketball Super Cup
- Portuguese Basketball Champions Tournament
