= Portuguese Basketball Super Cup =

The Portuguese Basketball Super Cup is a men's professional basketball competition in Portugal (Portuguese: "Supertaça de Portugal de Basquetebol") and it is played by the champions of the Portuguese league and the winners of the Portuguese Cup. It is a super cup competition. Benfica have won a record 16 trophies.

== Results ==
Year
Year	Winners	Score	Runners-up
1984	C.A. Queluz	64–92 / 121–78	Barreirense
1985	Benfica		Barreirense
1986	FC Porto		Benfica
1987	Not played		
1988	Ovarense		Benfica
1989	Benfica (2)		Ovarense
1990	Ovarense (2)		Benfica
1991	Benfica (3)	96–83	FC Porto
1992	Illiabum	71–69	Benfica
1993	Ovarense (3)	93–92	Benfica
1994	Benfica (4)	65–53	Ovarense
1995	Benfica (5)	77–73	FC Porto
1996	Benfica (6)	81–76	FC Porto
1997	FC Porto (2)	77–70	Ovarense
1998	Benfica (7)	72–64	Estrelas da Avenida
1999	FC Porto (3)	85–81	Ovarense
2000	Ovarense (4)	74–68	FC Porto
2001	Ovarense (5)	84–83	Portugal Telecom
2002	Portugal Telecom	81–73	Oliveirense
2003	Oliveirense	97–76	CAB Madeira
2004	FC Porto (4)	97–69	Ovarense
2005	C.A. Queluz	83–78	Ovarense
2006	Ovarense (6)	81–77	FC Porto
2007	Ovarense (7)	66–56	FC Porto
2008	Ovarense (8)	77–63	Vitória de Guimarães
2009	Benfica (8)	69–61	Ovarense
2010	Benfica (9)	66–63	FC Porto
2011	FC Porto (5)	76–62	CAB Madeira
2012	Benfica (10)	68–53	Académica
2013	Benfica (11)	86–82	Vitória de Guimarães
2014	Benfica (12)	82–63	Galitos
2015	Benfica (13)	79–42	Barcelos
2016	FC Porto (6)	84–70	Benfica
2017	Benfica (14)	104–74	CAB Madeira
2018	Oliveirense (2)	97–89	Illiabum
2019	FC Porto (7)	92–69	Oliveirense
2020	Not played due to the COVID-19 pandemic		
2021	Sporting CP (1)	74–64	Imortal
2022	Sporting CP (2)	89–84	Benfica
2023	Benfica (15)	93–75	Imortal
2024	FC Porto (8)	97–93	Benfica
2025	Benfica (16)	91–65	FC Porto
2026	FC Porto (9)	80–76	Sporting CP

== Performance by club ==
Team	Won	Runners-up	Years won	Years runners-up
Benfica	16	8	1985, 1989, 1991, 1994, 1995, 1996, 1998, 2009, 2010, 2012, 2013, 2014, 2015, 2017, 2023, 2025	1986, 1988, 1990, 1992, 1993, 2016, 2022, 2024
FC Porto	9	8	1986, 1997, 1999, 2004, 2011, 2016, 2019, 2024, 2026	1991, 1995, 1996, 2000, 2006, 2007, 2010, 2025
Ovarense	8	7	1988, 1990, 1993, 2000, 2001, 2006, 2007, 2008	1989, 1994, 1997, 1999, 2004, 2005, 2009
Oliveirense	2	2	2003, 2018	2002, 2019
C.A. Queluz	2	0	1984, 2005	–
Sporting CP	2	1	2021, 2022	2026
Portugal Telecom	1	1	2002	2001
Illiabum	1	1	1992	2018
CAB Madeira	0	3	–	2003, 2011, 2017
Barreirense	0	2	–	1984, 1985
Vitória de Guimarães	0	2	–	2008, 2013
Imortal	0	2	–	2021, 2023
Estrelas Avenida	0	1	–	1998
Académica	0	1	–	2012
Galitos	0	1	–	2014
Barcelos	0	1	–	2015

== Sources ==
- List of finals
