= Portuguese Basketball League Cup =

The Portuguese Basketball League Cup (Taça da Liga) is a competition for Portuguese teams that play in LPB. It was played by the clubs of the former LCB, which was a professional league. After the LCB folded in 2008, the League Cup ended as well. In the 2009–10 season, the competition was restarted as Hugo dos Santos Cup (Taça Hugo dos Santos), in honor of the former president of the Portuguese Basketball Federation.

== League Cup winners ==
Season	Final		
Season	Winners	Result	Runners-up
1989–90	Benfica		Beira-Mar
1990–91	Benfica (2)		Ovarense
1991–92	Ovarense		Beira-Mar
1992–93	Benfica (3)		Ovarense
1993–94	Benfica (4)		Beira-Mar
1994–95	Benfica (5)		Beira-Mar
1995–96	Benfica (6)		
1996–97	Ovarense (2)		Benfica
1997–98	Esgueira	95–94	Portugal Telecom
1998–99	Seixal FC		Porto
1999–2000	Porto		Illiabum Clube
2000–01	Ovarense (3)		Benfica
2001–02	Porto (2)		Portugal Telecom
2002–03	Oliveirense		Portugal Telecom
2003–04	Porto (3)		C.A. Queluz
2004–05	CAB Madeira	94–87	Porto
2005–06	Oliveirense (2)	83–77	Ovarense
2006–07	Lusitânia	80–73	Benfica
2007–08	Porto (4)	67–64	Ovarense
2008–09	Not played. Competition renamed Taça Hugo dos Santos.		
2009–10	Porto (5)	74–53	Ovarense
2010–11	Benfica (7)	76–75	Porto
2011–12	Porto (6)	79–77	Barreirense
2012–13	Benfica (8)	85–74	Académica
2013–14	Benfica (9)	83–82	CAB Madeira
2014–15	Benfica (10)	73–62	Vitória de Guimarães
2015–16	Porto (7)	69–68	Benfica
2016–17	Benfica (11)	77–60	Porto
2017–18	Benfica (12)	99–85	Oliveirense
2018–19	Oliveirense (3)	77–70	Benfica
2019–20	Oliveirense (4)	83–81	Benfica
2020–21	Porto (8)	72–68	Sporting CP
2021–22	Sporting CP	66–64	Benfica
2022–23	Sporting CP (2)	79–71	Ovarense
2023–24	Benfica (13)	72–66	Porto
2024–25	Oliveirense (5)	83–78	Porto
2025–26	Sporting CP (3)	79–77	Benfica

=== Performance by club ===
Team	Won	Runner-up	Years won	Years runner-up
Benfica	13	8	1990, 1991, 1993, 1994, 1995, 1996, 2011, 2013, 2014, 2015, 2017, 2018, 2024	1997, 2001, 2007, 2016, 2019, 2020, 2022, 2026
Porto	8	6	2000, 2002, 2004, 2008, 2010, 2012, 2016, 2021	1999, 2005, 2011, 2017, 2024, 2025
Oliveirense	5	1	2003, 2006, 2019, 2020, 2025	2018
Ovarense	3	6	1992, 1997, 2001	1991, 1993, 2006, 2008, 2010, 2023
Sporting CP	3	1	2022, 2023, 2026	2021
CAB Madeira	1	1	2005	2014
Esgueira	1	0	1998	–
Seixal FC	1	0	1999	–
Lusitânia	1	0	2007	–
Beira-Mar	0	4	–	1990, 1992, 1994, 1995
Portugal Telecom	0	3	–	1998, 2002, 2003
Illiabum	0	1	–	2000
C.A. Queluz	0	1	–	2004
Barreirense	0	1	–	2012
Académica	0	1	–	2013
Vitória de Guimarães	0	1	–	2015
