= Ovarense Basquetebol =

Professional basketball team in Ovar, Portugal

- Leagues: Liga Portuguesa de Basquetebol
- Founded: 1970; 55 years ago
- Arena: Arena de Ovar
- Capacity: 3,000
- Location: Ovar, Portugal
- President: Henrique Araújo Sobreira
- Head coach: João Tiago Silva
- Championships: 5 Portuguese Championships; 3 Portuguese Cups; 8 Portuguese SuperCups; 3 Portuguese League Cups; 3 Portuguese Champions Tournaments
- Website: www.ovarense.pt
Home	Away	Third

Ovarense Basquetebol is a professional basketball team that plays in Ovar, Portugal. The team plays in the LPB. The Ovarense created its section of basketball in 1970, with the initiative of a member entrepreneur, João Gonçalves, but in this period of time managed to assert itself as one of the standards and the inevitable reference method in Portugal.

== History ==
Between 1976–77 and 1978–79, Ovarense ascended from third to first, on the national level, indicating that the team's basketball vocation was strong. The club never fell from its division, and the arrival of two Americans at the end of the 80s gave the team the quality required to raise its level.

== Honours ==
- Liga Portuguesa de Basquetebol: 5

1987–88, 1999–00, 2005–06, 2006–07, 2007–08

- Taça de Portugal: 3

1988–89, 1989–90, 2008–09

- Supertaça de Portugal: 8

1988, 1990, 1993, 2000, 2001, 2006, 2007, 2008

- Taça da Liga/Hugo dos Santos: 3

1991–92, 1996–97, 2000–01

- Troféu António Pratas LPB:2

2009, 2014

- Torneio dos Campeões: 3

2004–05, 2006–07, 2007–08

== Notable players ==
Note: Flags indicate national team eligibility at FIBA-sanctioned events. Players may hold other non-FIBA nationalities not displayed.

Criteria

To appear in this section a player must have either:

- Set a club record or won an individual award while at the club
- Played at least one official international match for their national team at any time
- Played at least one official NBA match at any time.

- (United States) Mario Elie 2 seasons '87-'89
- (United States) Nate Johnston 1 season '99-'00
- (United States) Anthony Pullard 1 season '95-'96
- (United States) Jason Sasser 1 season '04-'05
- (Poland) Michał Ignerski 1 season '04-'05
- (United States) Greg Butler [unknown number of seasons]
