= Santo António dos Olivais =

- Civil parish
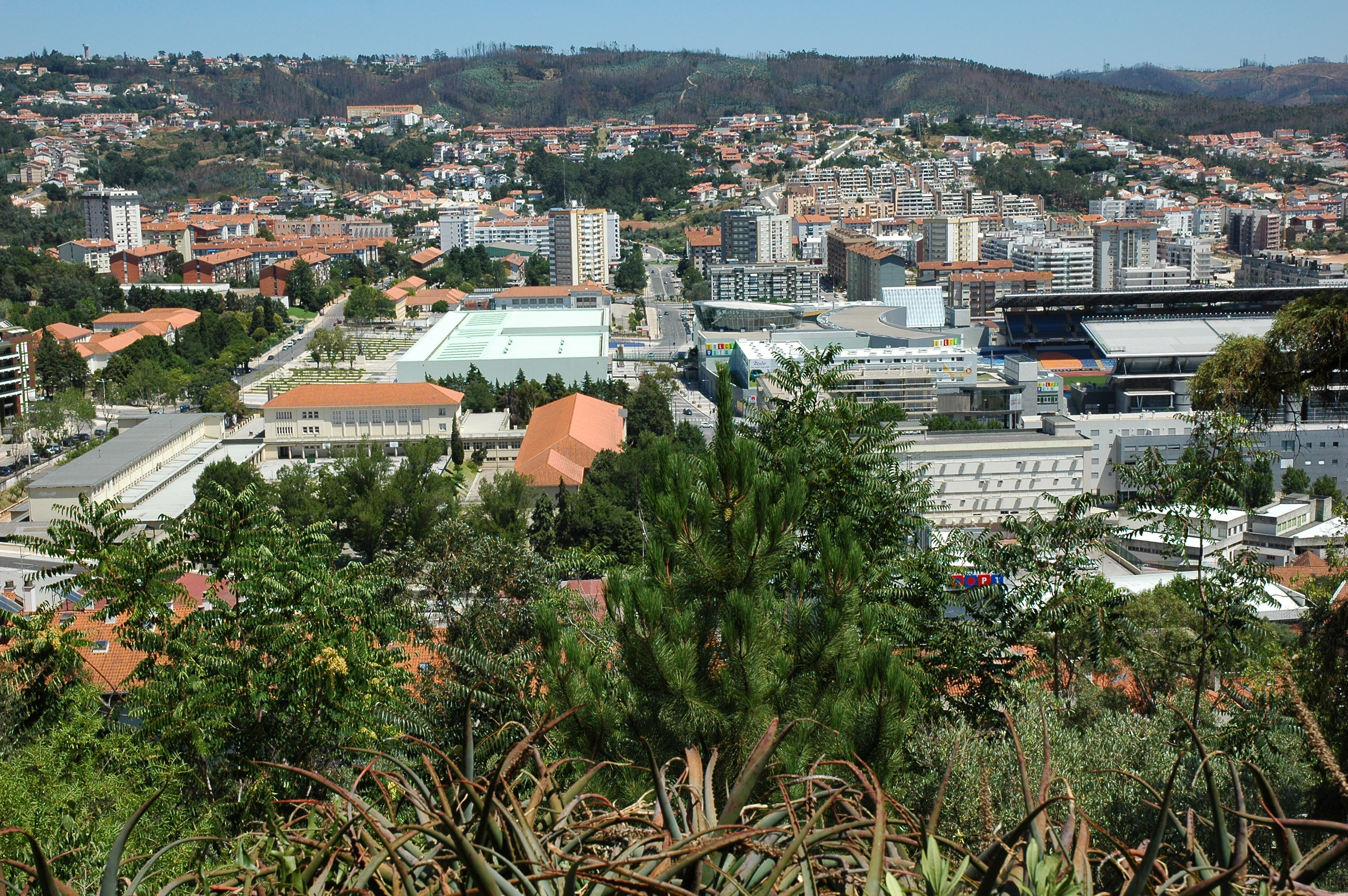
- The residential area Solum

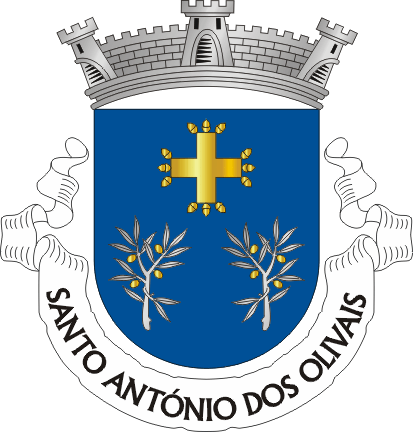
- Coat of arms

- Coordinates: 40.218°N 8.404°W
- Country: Portugal
- Region: Centro
- Intermunic. comm.: Região de Coimbra
- District: Coimbra
- Municipality: Coimbra

Area
  - Total: 19.27 km^{2} (7.44 sq mi)
- Elevation: 69 m (226 ft)

Population (2011)
  - Total: 38,936
  - Density: 2,021/km^{2} (5,233/sq mi)
- Time zone: UTC+00:00 (WET)
  - Summer (DST): UTC+01:00 (WEST)
- Postal code: 3000
- Area code: 239
- Patron: Santo António
- Website: http://www.jfsao.pt

Santo António dos Olivais, commonly shortened to Olivais, is an urban civil parish in the municipality of Coimbra in Portugal, making up the eastern part of the historic city of Coimbra, east of University Hill. The population in 2011 was 38,936, in an area of 19.27 km². It is the most populated parish in the Municipality of Coimbra, and among the most densely inhabited in the country outside of Lisbon and Porto metropolitan areas. It houses the major medical, sports, educational and scientific facilities of Coimbra, with a high concentration of health services in the area of Celas. Created in 1836, the parish was named for Anthony of Padua (1195 – 1231), who joined the local branch of the Order of Friars Minor; Anthony took his name from Saint Anthony the Great, to whom the local Franciscan hermitage was dedicated.

== History ==
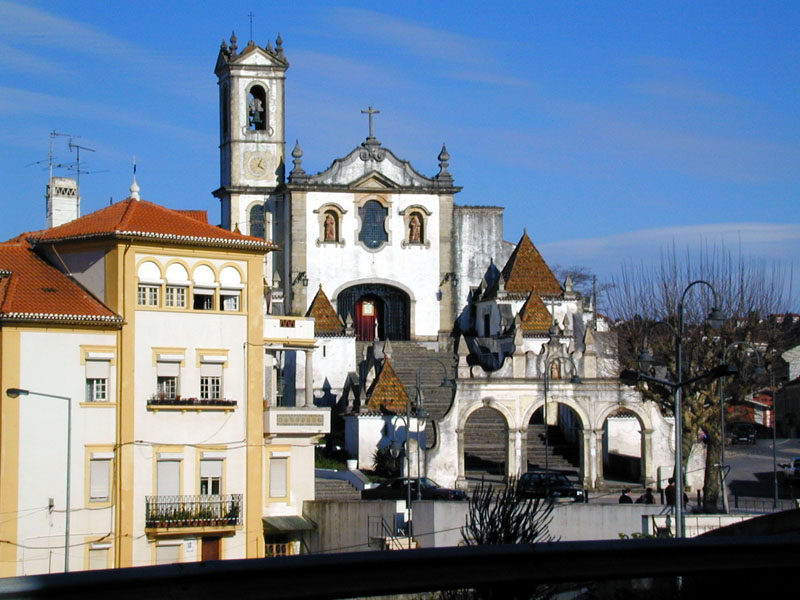
The ornate Church of Santo António dos Olivais, part of the former monastery of Celas.

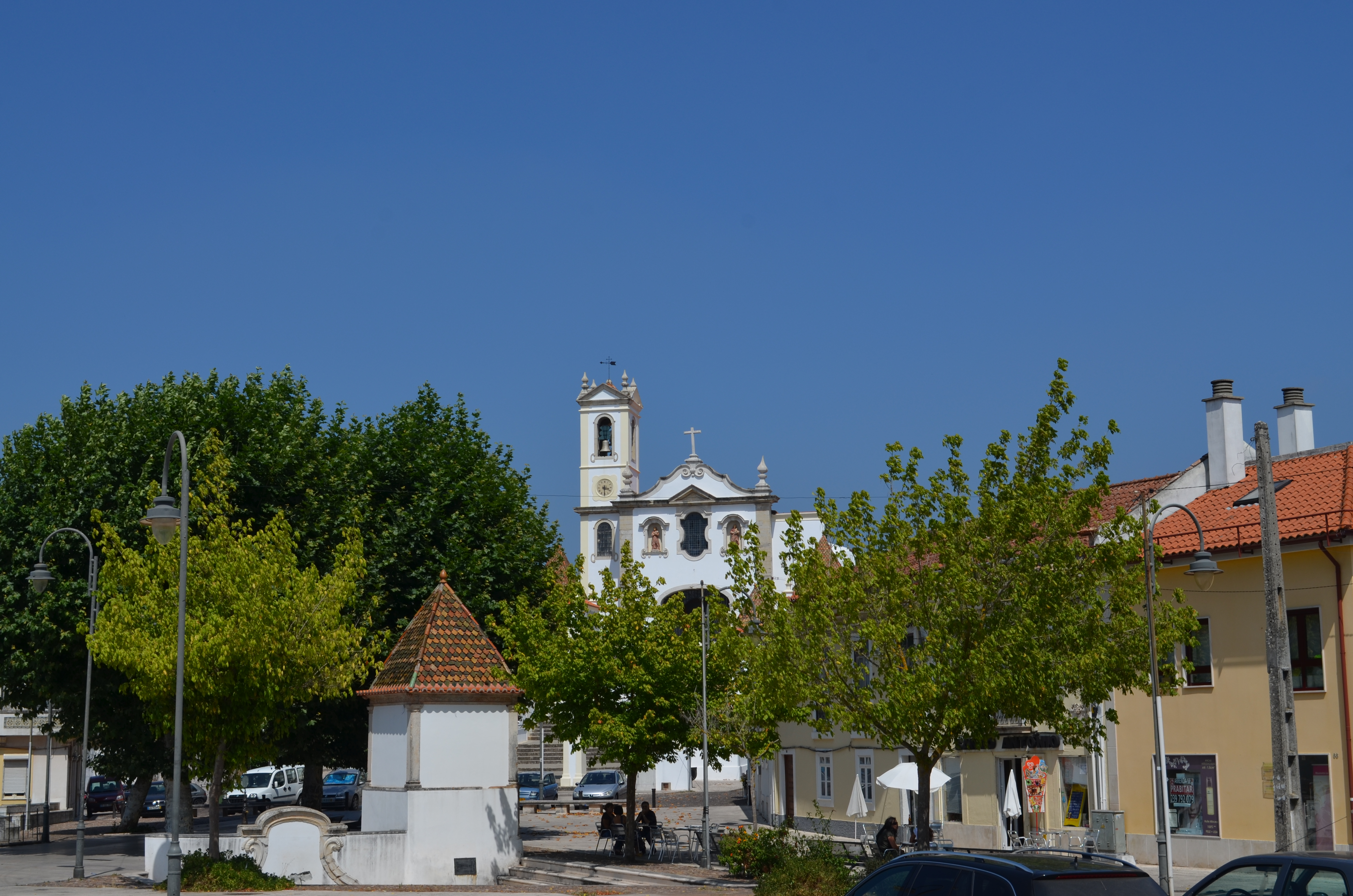
Santo António dos Olivais civil parish in Coimbra - the Church of Saint Anthony of Olivais.

Even by 1064, before the creation of the Kingdom of Portugal (1143), the region of Olivais was pasturelands interspersed by parcels where the local settlers cultivated vineyards and olive orchards, in addition to vegetable gardens and fruit trees, while the remaining lands were still forested (such Malheiros, Tovins, Picoto, Dianteiro and Rocha Nova).

The beginnings of the parish occurred in the 13th century (around 1210), when D. Sancha (daughter of King Sancho I) founded the Royal Monastery of Santa Maria de Celas, in the locality of Vimarães, under administration of friars of the Order of Saint Bernard. The establishment of the monastery in Vimarães was basis for the founding of the parish of Celas.

A few years later (between 1217 and 1218), Queen Urraca (wife of Afonso II) donated a small chapel on a hill of olive groves to the first Franciscan friars arriving into Portugal, which they transformed into a humble hermitage dedicated to Saint Anthony the Great.

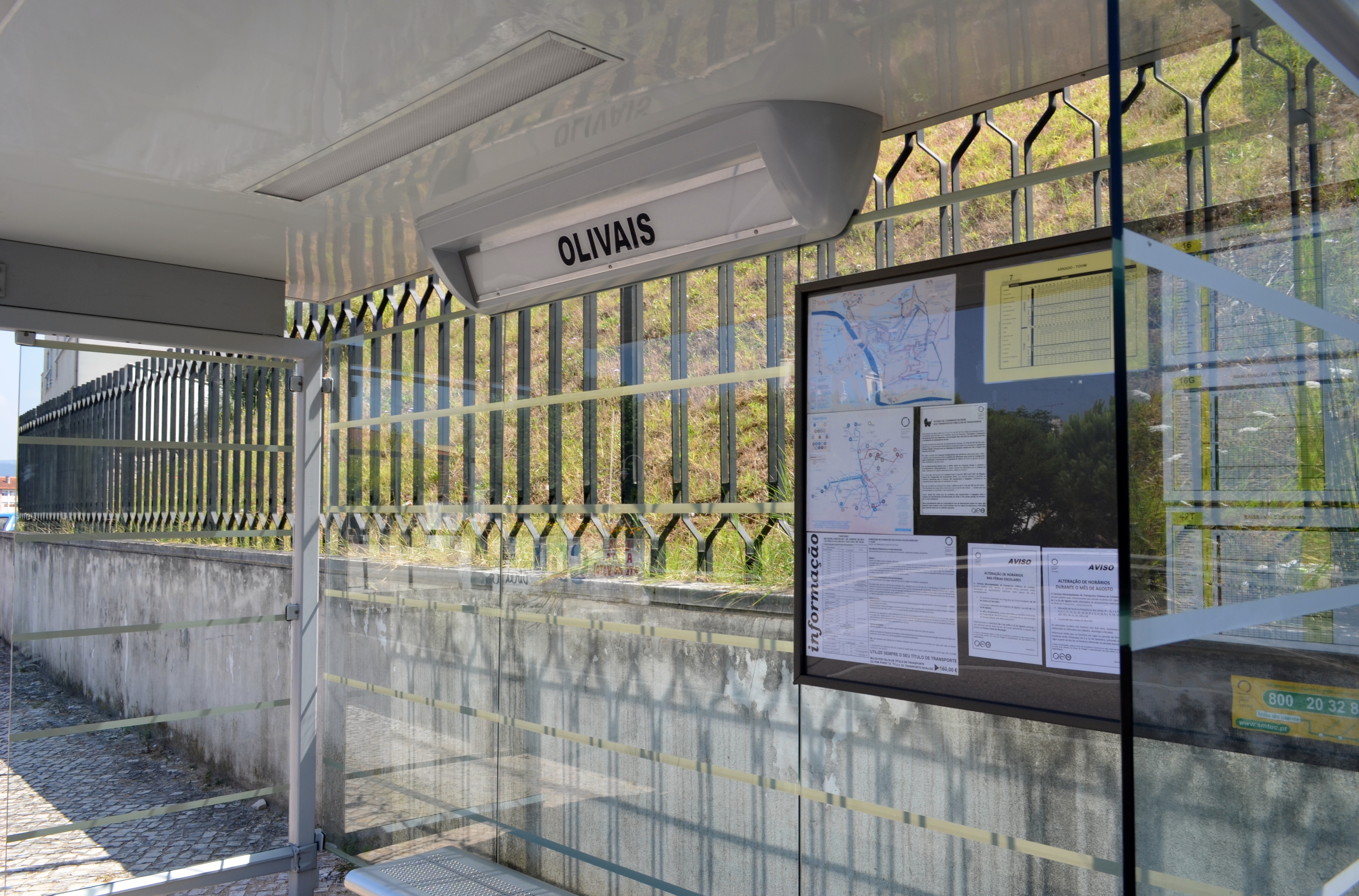
Santo António dos Olivais - public bus stop.

Around 1220, friar Fernando de Bulhões after taking religious orders at the Augustinian Monastery of Santa Cruz (Coimbra) joined the humble Franciscans friars, adopting the name of the small chapel's patron. After his death (1231 in the Italian town of Padua), he was canonized almost immediately, and the Franciscan friary that flourished in Olivais quickly changed its patron from Saint Anthony the Great to Anthony of Padua, becoming known as Santo António de Olivais and attracting new settlers into the region. By 1247, the Convent of São Francisco da Ponte attracted many friars, resulting in the late 15th century delimitation of the churchyard and convent in the 16th century.

Slowly the built-up area developed within the territory, with new agglomerations forming around the principal centres of Celas and Olivais; by 1740 the town of Celas had 48 buildings with about 200 inhabitants, while Olivais had just about the same.

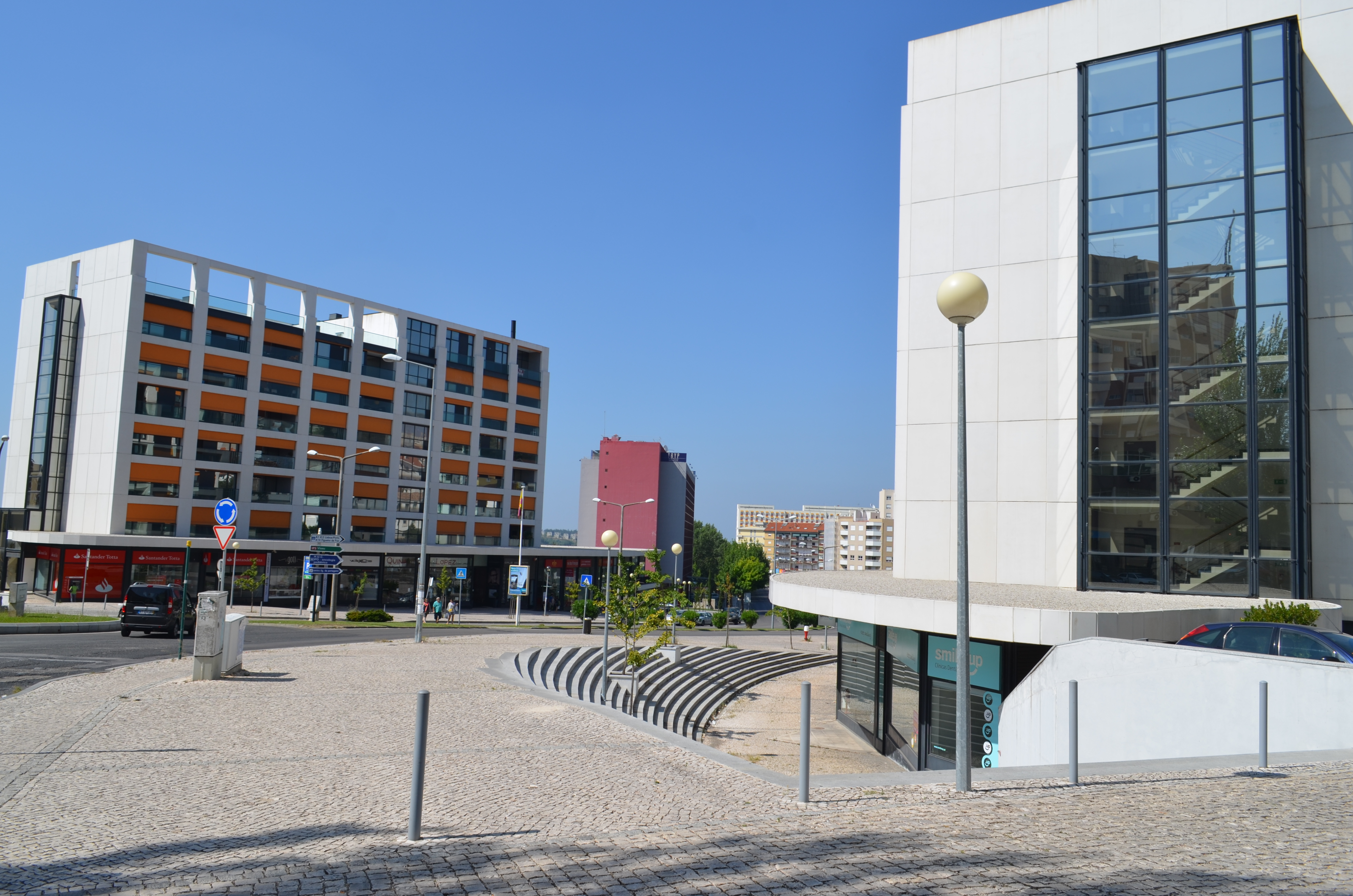
Dr Armando Gonçalves Lane - Santo António dos Olivais, Coimbra.

On the night of 10–11 November 1851, a fire gutted the cloister, dormitory and other dependencies of the convent (now the churchyard and cemetery of the current structure). Renovations and remodelling of the Church of Nossa Senhora da Piedade (which was the church of Saint Germain) continued after May, becoming the parochial church of the newly defined parish of Santo António dos Olivais.

By 1854, with the expulsion of the religious orders and municipal reforms, the need to reorganize the municipality of Coimbra, resulted in the 25 November 1854 decree establishing the civil parish of Santo António dos Olivais (that included 749 buildings and 3000 inhabitants), in addition to six other parishes. Olviais included the largest of these early settlements, established from the remnants of São Pedro and clergy of Torres.

== Geography ==
Population of Santo António dos Olivais (1854 - 2011)
Year	Pop.	±%
1854	3,000	—
1864	3,646	+21.5%
1890	4,495	+23.3%
1900	5,129	+14.1%
1911	6,102	+19.0%
1920	6,249	+2.4%
1930	8,792	+40.7%
1940	9,419	+7.1%
1950	13,189	+40.0%
1960	18,015	+36.6%
1970	19,267	+6.9%
1981	32,268	+67.5%
1991		—
2001	39,516	—
2011	38,850	−1.7%

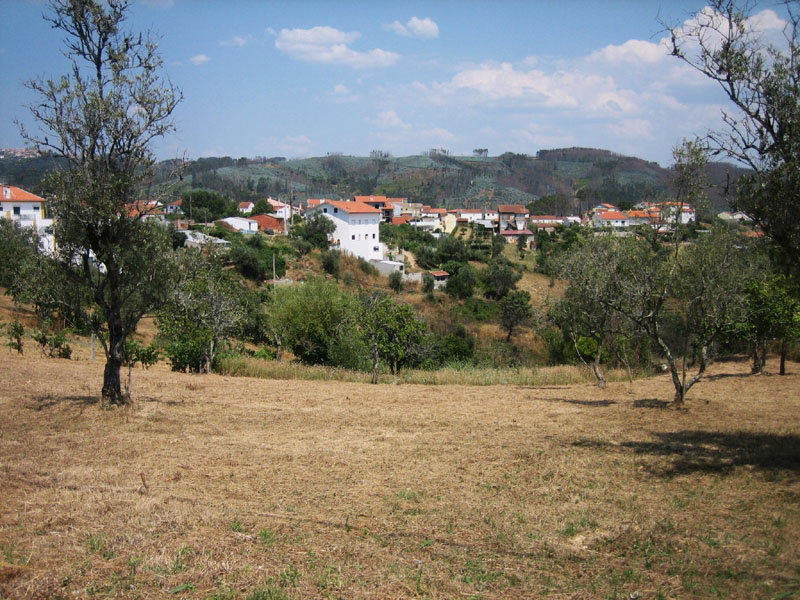
The locality of Cova do Ouro showing the old olive orchards that developed the settlements of Olivais

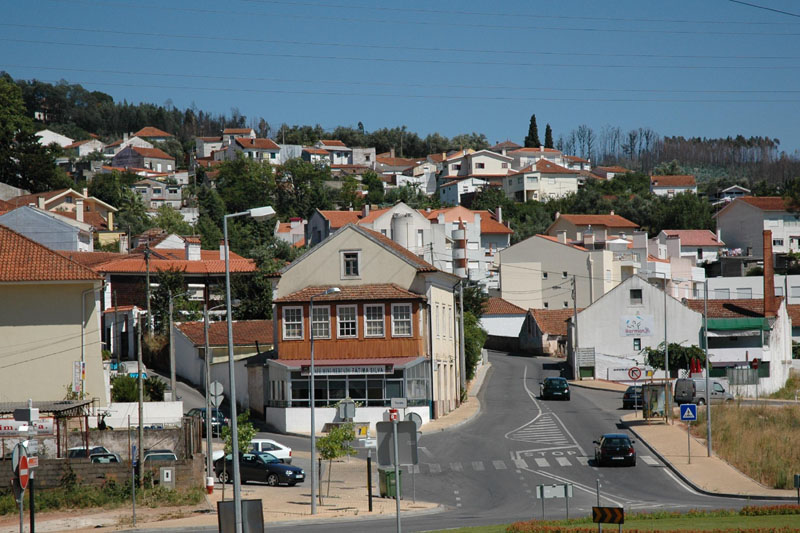
The urban suburbs of the main settlement of Santo António dos Olivais: the village of Tovim

The largest civil parish of Coimbra city proper and the most populated in the Municipality of Coimbra, the parish of Santo António dos Olivais is surrounded on all sides by neighbours from this political division: north by São Paulo dos Frades; east by Torres do Mondego; south, along the Mondego River, by the parishes of Ceira, Castelo Viegas and south/southwest by Santa Clara; and west by central civil parishes of Santa Cruz, Sé Nova and Almedina, which make up the core of the historical quarters of the city proper. The region is a semi-circular bowl, that extends from the riverbanks of the Mondego (in the south) to the foothills of Rocha Nova (in the north), skirting the populated city of Coimbra in the west and the eastern Mondego River valley near Misarela. The central part of the parish, intrinsic to the main city of Coimbra, is concentrated between the main road accessways: Avenida Mendes Silva (along the south) and Avenida Fernando Namora-Avenida Augusto Seabra that circles the outside perimeter of Coimbra (to the east).

It includes several individual places that formed during the historical settlement of the region, including: Olivais, Celas, Solum, Calhabé, Norton de Matos, Arregaça, Vale das Flores, Quinta da Nora, Quinta da Boavista, Casa Branca, Chão do Bispo, Picoto, Vale de Canas, Casal do Lobo, Cova do Ouro, Alto de S. João, Pinhal de Marrocos, Portela and Tovim.

== Economy ==
Santo António dos Olivais houses several major facilities of Coimbra, including many University of Coimbra's sites (the Pólo II Campus of the University of Coimbra (FCTUC) - engineering; the Pólo III Campus of the University of Coimbra (FMUC and FFUC) - medicine and pharmacy; the University of Coimbra Faculty of Economics (FEUC) - economics, business and sociology; the Coimbra University Hospitals (HUC); the Centre for Neuroscience and Cell Biology of Coimbra (CNC) research centre; and the Instituto Pedro Nunes (IPN) business incubator), as well as the Coimbra's Oncology Hospital (IPO), the polytechnical Coimbra Engineering Institute (ISEC), the Coimbra Nursing School (ESEnfC), the Coimbra Hotel and Tourism School, the municipal city stadium and swimming pools, the Coimbra Multisports Arena, hotels, hostels and the city's camping park. The Rádio e Televisão de Portugal (RTP) branch at Coimbra is located in the civil parish.

== Sport ==
Both the Coimbra City Stadium and the Pavilhão Multiusos de Coimbra, a multi-sports indoor arena, whose the owner is the Coimbra City Council, are in Santo António dos Olivais.

The Associação Académica de Coimbra - O.A.F., an autonomous professional football team of the University of Coimbra's students union Associação Académica de Coimbra, has a multi-sports indoor pavilion (Pavilhão Jorge Anjinho) in the civil parish as well as its official store inside the Coimbra City Stadium.

C.F. União de Coimbra, founded in 1919, is headquartered in Santo António dos Olivais.

Olivais Futebol Clube, founded in 1935 in Santo António dos Olivais, is noted for its women's basketball team that has won the Liga Feminina de Basquetebol and the Portuguese Women's Basketball Cup.

== See also ==
- Saint Anthony of Lisbon
