= São Bartolomeu (Coimbra) =

- Civil parish
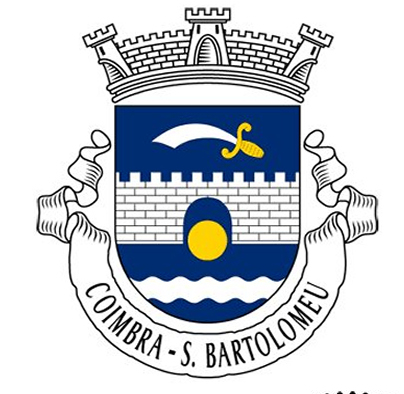
- Coat of arms

- Location in Portugal
- Coordinates: 40°12′36″N 8°26′2″W
- Country: Portugal
- Region: Centro
- Intermunic. comm.: Região de Coimbra
- District: Coimbra
- Municipality: Coimbra
- Disbanded: 28 January 2013

Area
  - Total: 0.17 km^{2} (0.07 sq mi)

Population (2011)
  - Total: 627
  - Density: 3,700/km^{2} (9,600/sq mi)
- Time zone: UTC+00:00 (WET)
  - Summer (DST): UTC+01:00 (WEST)
- Patron: Bartholomew the Apostle

São Bartolomeu is a former civil parish in the municipality of Coimbra, Portugal. The population in 2011 was 627 in an area of 0.17 km^{2}, meaning it's the least populated bairro in Coimbra. On 28 January 2013 it merged with Sé Nova, Santa Cruz, and Almedina to form Coimbra (Sé Nova, Santa Cruz, Almedina e São Bartolomeu). It is home to the Igreja de Santiago and Ponte de Santa Clara.

Population of the civil parish of São Bartolomeu (1864–2011)
Year	Pop.	±%
1864	3,160	—
1878	3,484	+10.3%
1890	3,776	+8.4%
1900	3,872	+2.5%
1911	3,881	+0.2%
1920	3,532	−9.0%
1930	3,533	+0.0%
1940	3,810	+7.8%
1950	3,707	−2.7%
1960	3,451	−6.9%
1970	2,484	−28.0%
1981	2,172	−12.6%
1991	1,395	−35.8%
2001	856	−38.6%
2011	627	−26.8%
