= List of DAZN programming =

Sports streaming programming

DAZN is a British global over-the-top entertainment platform primarily offering sports streaming. The service has acquired the rights to broadcast and stream a variety of leagues and competitions. Some rights are available worldwide while others are specific to a selection of countries.

== Sports rights ==
Noted sports rights held by DAZN include:

=== Football ===
Competition	Region	Broadcast Details	Sources
FIFA ASEAN Cup	Worldwide (Note: via FIFA+) (excluding Australia, Bangladesh, Bhutan, Hong Kong, Indonesia, Laos, Macau, Nepal, Pakistan, Philippines, Singapore, Sri Lanka, and Vietnam)	Local TV broadcaster in Malaysia	
Finalissima	Austria, Canada, Germany, Japan, Switzerland		
FIFA Series	Worldwide	Restrictions may apply for some countries	
FIFA U-15 World Cup & Festival	Worldwide	Restrictions may apply for some countries	
FIFA U-20 Women's World Cup	Worldwide	Restrictions may apply for some countries	
FIFA U-17 Women's World Cup	Worldwide	Restrictions may apply for some countries	
FIFA Women's World Cup	Germany	Highlights	
FIFA World Cup qualification (UEFA)	Austria, Belgium, Canada, Germany, Japan, Liechtenstein, Luxembourg, Switzerland	Live until 2028 (delayed for Germany national team matches; unavailable for both Austria and Switzerland national team matches respectively)	
UEFA Euro qualifying	Andorra, Austria, Belgium, Canada, France, (Note: via La Chaîne L'Équipe) Germany, Japan, Spain, Switzerland	Live until 2028 (delayed for Germany and Spain national team matches; unavailable for both Austria and Switzerland national team matches respectively)	
UEFA Nations League	Andorra, Austria, Belgium, Canada, France, Germany, Japan, Spain, Switzerland	Live until 2028 (delayed for Germany national team matches; unavailable for both Austria and Switzerland national team matches respectively)	
UEFA European Under-19 Championship	Germany (Note: via Sportdigital)		
UEFA Women's Under-19 Championship	Germany		
FIFA World Cup qualification (AFC)	Japan		
AFC Asian Cup	Austria, Germany, Japan, Switzerland		
AFC U-23 Asian Cup	Austria, Germany, Japan, Switzerland	Live until 2028	
AFC U-20 Asian Cup	Japan	Live until 2028	
AFC U-17 Asian Cup	Japan	Live until 2028	
AFC Women's Asian Cup	Japan	Live until 2028	
AFC Women's Olympic Qualifying Tournament	Japan	Live until 2028	
AFC U-20 Women's Asian Cup	Japan	Live until 2028	
AFC U-17 Women's Asian Cup	Japan	Live until 2028	
FIFA World Cup qualification (CONMEBOL)	France		
Copa América	Austria, Germany, Switzerland		
CONMEBOL Sub-20	Austria, Canada, Germany		
CONCACAF Gold Cup	Austria, Canada, Germany		
FIFA World Cup qualification (CAF)	Austria, Germany, Switzerland		
Africa Cup of Nations	Austria, Germany, Switzerland		
Women's Africa Cup of Nations	Austria, Germany, Switzerland		
FIFA Club World Cup	Worldwide		
FIFA Women's Champions Cup	Worldwide (excluding Brazil, China, Ireland, Morocco and United Kingdom)	In the United States, only the semi-finals will be broadcast	
UEFA Champions League	Canada, Germany, Malaysia, (Note: via beIN Sports) New Zealand, Portugal, Singapore, United States	Live until 2027	
UEFA Europa League	Canada, Malaysia, New Zealand, Portugal, Singapore, United States	Live until 2027	
UEFA Conference League	Canada, Malaysia, New Zealand, Portugal, Singapore	Live until 2027	
UEFA Super Cup	Canada, Germany, Malaysia, New Zealand, Singapore	Live until 2026	
UEFA Youth League	Canada, Germany, Malaysia, New Zealand, Portugal, Singapore	Live until 2026	
Premier League	Andorra, Portugal, Spain	Live until 2031	
English Football League	Canada, Japan		
National League	Worldwide (via National League TV)	Live until 2031	
National League North	Worldwide (via National League TV)	Live until 2031	
National League South	Worldwide (via National League TV)	Live until 2031	
FA Cup	Austria, Belgium, Germany, Italy, Liechtenstein, Luxembourg, Switzerland	Portugal and Spain begins in 2028; Live until 2028	
EFL Cup	Canada, Japan		
EFL Trophy	Canada, Japan		
FA Community Shield	Austria, Belgium, Germany, Italy, Liechtenstein, Luxembourg, Switzerland	Portugal and Spain begins in 2028; Live until 2027	
La Liga	Andorra, Austria, Belgium, Chile, (Note: via DSports) Colombia, Ecuador, France, Germany, Italy, Japan, Liechtenstein, Luxembourg, Peru, Portugal, San Marino, Spain, Sub-Saharan Africa, Switzerland, Uruguay, Taiwan and Venezuela	165 matches per season and some free matches in Spain; Live until 2029 in Sub-Saharan Africa; Highlights globally	
Segunda División	Andorra, Austria, Belgium, Chile, Colombia, Ecuador, France, Germany, Italy, Japan, Liechtenstein, Luxembourg, Peru, Portugal, San Marino, Spain, Sub-Saharan Africa, Switzerland, Uruguay, Taiwan and Venezuela		
Primera Federación	Spain	10 games per matchday and playoff matches	
Copa del Rey	Austria, France, Germany, Italy, San Marino, Switzerland		
Supercopa de España	Austria, France, Germany, Italy, San Marino, Switzerland		
Liga F	Andorra, Spain	Live until 2029	
Bundesliga	Andorra, Austria, Canada, Germany, Japan, Liechtenstein, Luxembourg, Malaysia, Portugal, Singapore, Spain, Switzerland	Live until 2029 in DACH and Spain; Live until 2028 in Japan; Live until 2027 in Canada; Bundesliga Konferenz and Sunday live matches only for DACH); Highlights globally	
2. Bundesliga	Andorra, Austria, Belgium, Canada, Germany, Malaysia, Portugal, Singapore, Spain, Switzerland	highlights only for DACH via Bild	
3. Liga	Austria, Germany, Switzerland	Highlights	
DFB-Pokal	Austria, Belgium, Canada, France, Germany, Japan, Portugal, Switzerland	Highlights only for DACH	
DFL-Supercup	Andorra, Austria, Canada, Germany, Malaysia, Portugal, Singapore, Spain, Switzerland	Highlights only for DACH	
Frauen-Bundesliga	Brazil, Canada, Europe (excluding Denmark, Estonia, Finland, Iceland, Latvia, Lithuania, Netherlands, Norway, Poland and Sweden), Japan	Live until 2027	
2. Frauen-Bundesliga	Austria, (Note: via DFB.TV) Germany, Switzerland		
DFB-Pokal Frauen	Brazil, Canada, Europe (excluding Denmark, Estonia, Finland, Iceland, Latvia, Lithuania, Netherlands, Norway, Poland and Sweden), Japan	Live until 2027	
DFB-Supercup Frauen	Brazil, Canada, Europe (excluding Denmark, Estonia, Finland, Iceland, Latvia, Lithuania, Netherlands, Norway, Poland and Sweden), Japan	Live until 2027	
Serie A	Andorra, Austria, Belgium, France, Germany, Ireland, Italy, Liechtenstein, Luxembourg, Japan, San Marino, Spain, Switzerland, United Kingdom	Live until 2029 in Italy, France, Spain and DACH; Live until 2027 in other countries; Highlights globally excluding MENA	
Serie B	Italy, San Marino	Live until 2027	
Coppa Italia	Andorra, Austria, Belgium, Chile, Colombia, Ecuador, France, Germany, Ireland, Liechtenstein, Luxembourg, Japan, Peru, Spain, Switzerland, United Kingdom, United States, Uruguay and Venezuela	Live until 2027; Highlights globally excluding MENA	
Supercoppa Italiana	Andorra, Austria, Belgium, Chile, Colombia, Ecuador, France, Germany, Ireland, Liechtenstein, Luxembourg, Japan, Peru, Spain, Switzerland, United Kingdom, United States, Uruguay and Venezuela	Live until 2026; Highlights globally excluding MENA	
Campionato Nazionale Under-17 Serie C	Italy		
Serie A Women	Austria, Belgium, Canada, Germany, Italy, Japan, Portugal, San Marino, Spain, United Kingdom, United States and other global territories		
Coppa Italia Women	Austria, Belgium, Canada, Germany, Italy, Japan, Portugal, San Marino, Spain, United Kingdom, United States and other global territories		
Supercoppa Women	Austria, Belgium, Canada, Germany, Italy, Japan, Portugal, San Marino, Spain, United Kingdom, United States and other global territories		
Ligue 1	Andorra, Austria, Belgium, France, (Note: via Ligue 1+) Germany, Japan, Liechtenstein, Luxembourg, Spain, Switzerland		
Ligue 2	Austria, Germany, Japan, Switzerland		
Ligue 3	France		
Coupe de France	Japan, Malaysia, Singapore, Thailand and selected asian countries		
Trophée des Champions	Andorra, Austria, Belgium, Luxembourg, Germany, Japan, Spain, Switzerland		
Division 1 Féminine	Austria, France, Germany, Ireland, Spain, United Kingdom, United States		
Coupe de France Féminine	Japan, Malaysia, Singapore, Thailand and selected asian countries		
Trophée des Championnes	Austria, France, Germany, Ireland, Spain, United Kingdom, United States		
Primeira Liga	Andorra, Austria, Belgium, Chile, Colombia, Ecuador,, Germany, Italy, Japan, Peru,, San Marino, Spain, Switzerland, Uruguay and Venezuela	Live until 2028	
Eredivisie	Andorra, Austria, France, Germany, Portugal, Spain, Switzerland	Live in Portugal until 2030	
KNVB Cup	Andorra, Austria, Chile, Colombia, Ecuador, France, Germany, Peru, Portugal, Spain, Switzerland and Uruguay	Live in Portugal until 2030	
Johan Cruyff Shield	Andorra, Austria, Chile, Colombia, Ecuador, France, Germany, Peru, Portugal, Spain, Switzerland and Uruguay	Live in Portugal until 2030	
Vrouwen Eredivisie	Andorra, Spain		
Belgian Pro League	Worldwide		
Challenger Pro League	Belgium		
Belgian Cup	Worldwide		
Pro League Supercup	Worldwide		
Belgian Women's Super League	Belgium		
Scottish Premiership	Austria, Belgium, Germany, Switzerland		
Scottish League Cup	Austria, Belgium, Germany, Switzerland		
Ekstraklasa	Austria, Germany, Switzerland		
Czech First League	Austria, Germany, Switzerland		
Turkish Super Cup	Austria, Germany, Switzerland		
Premiership Women	Worldwide	Live until 2027	
NIFL Women's Premiership League Cup	Worldwide	Live until 2027	
AFC Champions League Elite	Japan	Live until 2028	
AFC Champions League Two	Austria, Germany, Japan, Switzerland	Live until 2028 in Japan	
J1 League	Austria, Germany, Japan, Switzerland	Live until 2033 in Japan	
J2 League	Japan	Live until 2033	
J3 League	Japan	Live until 2033	
U-21 J.League	Japan		
WE League	Japan	Live until 2028	
A-League Men	Austria, Germany, Italy, Switzerland		
Saudi Pro League	Austria, Belgium, Canada, France, Germany, Ireland, United Kingdom	Highlights globally	
Saudi Super Cup	Austria, Belgium, Canada, France, Germany, Ireland, United Kingdom		
Copa Sudamericana	Chile, Colombia, Ecuador, Peru,, Uruguay and Venezuela		
CONMEBOL Libertadores Sub-20	Austria, Germany, Switzerland		
Brasileirão Série A	Austria, Germany, Switzerland		
Argentine Primera División	Austria, Germany, Switzerland		
Copa de la Liga Profesional	Austria, Germany, Switzerland		
Copa Argentina	Austria, Germany, Switzerland		
CAF Champions League	Worldwide (excluding Middle East and North Africa)	All the competition in Austria, Germany and Switzerland; Only final worldwide	
CAF Super Cup	Worldwide (excluding Middle East and North Africa)		
MADCUP Football	Worldwide		
Vertex Cup	Worldwide		
Ballon d'Or	Worldwide		

=== 3x3 ice hockey ===
Competition	Region	Broadcast Details	Sources
3ICE World Cup	Worldwide		
Ultimate Hockey League	Worldwide		

=== Action sports ===
Competition	Region	Broadcast Details	Sources
X Games League	Worldwide		

=== American football ===
Competition	Region	Broadcast Details	Sources
National Football League	Worldwide (via NFL Game Pass International; except China and United States)	Co-distribute in Andorra, Belgium, Italy, Japan, Luxembourg, Portugal and Spain	
NCAA	Except Caribbean, Latin America, United States and countries where the service is not available.	Rights to ESPN CFB coverage of ACC, Big 12 and SEC, and select games from the American, C-USA and Sun Belt.	
European tackle football championships	Worldwide		
A7FL	Worldwide		
Women's National Football Conference	Worldwide		
OT7	Worldwide (via NFL Network; except China and United States)		
Big Ten Conference	Worldwide (except United States). Games originally broadcast by NBC or Peacock in the USA not available in the Caribbean Basin. Games originally broadcast by CBS in the USA not available in Bermuda.		
Big 12 Conference	Worldwide (except United States and Latin America)	Only games originally broadcast by Fox Sports in US	
Mountain West Conference	Worldwide (except United States and Latin America)	Only games originally broadcast by Fox Sports in US	

=== Aquatic sports ===
Competition	Region	Broadcast Details	Sources
F1H2O World Championship	Worldwide		
Aquabike World Championship	Worldwide		

=== Athletics ===
Competition	Region	Broadcast Details	Sources
World Athletics Label Road Races	Worldwide	Selected Elite Label events	
Athlos	Worldwide		
RunGP	Worldwide		

=== Baseball ===
Competition	Region	Broadcast Details	Sources
WBSC Premier12	Worldwide (excluding Armenia, Azerbaijan, Belarus, Georgia, Japan, Kazakhstan, Kyrgyzstan, Mexico, Moldova, Russia, South Korea, Taiwan, Tajikistan, Turkmenistan, Ukraine and Uzbekistan)		
Women's Baseball World Cup	Worldwide (excluding Armenia, Azerbaijan, Belarus, Georgia, Japan, Kazakhstan, Kyrgyzstan, Mexico, Moldova, Russia, South Korea, Taiwan, Tajikistan, Turkmenistan, Ukraine and Uzbekistan)		
U-23 Baseball World Cup	Worldwide (excluding Armenia, Azerbaijan, Belarus, Georgia, Japan, Kazakhstan, Kyrgyzstan, Mexico, Moldova, Russia, South Korea, Taiwan, Tajikistan, Turkmenistan, Ukraine and Uzbekistan)		
U-15 Baseball World Cup	Worldwide (excluding Armenia, Azerbaijan, Belarus, Georgia, Japan, Kazakhstan, Kyrgyzstan, Mexico, Moldova, Russia, South Korea, Taiwan, Tajikistan, Turkmenistan, Ukraine and Uzbekistan)		
Major League Baseball	United States	New York Yankees games in New York state via YES Network (beginning in 2027)	
Nippon Professional Baseball	Japan, Taiwan	except Hiroshima Toyo Carp home matches in Japan, and Central League home matches in Taiwan.	
Chinese Professional Baseball League	Taiwan	Home games in regular season, playoff series and Taiwan Series of Dragons, Guardians, Lions and Monkeys. Responsible for productions of Monkeys' home games telecasts.	
Australian Baseball League	Japan		
Asia Winter League	Japan, Taiwan		
Japan Winter League	Japan		
Central League Climax Series	Japan		
Pacific League Climax Series	Japan		

=== Baseball5 ===
Competition	Region	Broadcast Details	Sources
Baseball5 World Cup	Worldwide (excluding Armenia, Azerbaijan, Belarus, Georgia, Japan, Kazakhstan, Kyrgyzstan, Mexico, Moldova, Russia, South Korea, Taiwan, Tajikistan, Turkmenistan, Ukraine and Uzbekistan)		

=== Basketball ===
Competition	Region	Broadcast Details	Sources
FIBA Basketball World Cup	Worldwide (via Courtside 1891; except China and Middle East & North Africa)	Local TV broadcaster in Chile, Colombia, Ecuador, Italy, Japan, Peru,, Uruguay and Venezuela	
FIBA Basketball World Cup qualification	Worldwide (via Courtside 1891; except China and Middle East & North Africa)	Local TV broadcaster in Chile, Colombia, Ecuador, Japan, Peru,, Uruguay and Venezuela	
EuroBasket	Worldwide (via Courtside 1891; except China and Middle East & North Africa)	Local TV broadcaster in Chile, Colombia, Ecuador, Japan, Peru,, Uruguay and Venezuela	
EuroBasket qualification	Worldwide (via Courtside 1891; except China and Middle East & North Africa)	Local TV broadcaster in Japan	
FIBA Asia Cup	Worldwide (via Courtside 1891; except China and Middle East & North Africa)	Local TV broadcaster in Japan	
FIBA Asia Cup qualification	Worldwide (via Courtside 1891; except China and Middle East & North Africa)		
FIBA AmeriCup	Worldwide (via Courtside 1891; except China and Middle East & North Africa)	Local TV broadcaster in Chile, Colombia, Ecuador, Peru,, Uruguay and Venezuela	
FIBA AmeriCup qualification	Worldwide (via Courtside 1891; except China and Middle East & North Africa)	Local TV broadcaster in Chile, Colombia, Ecuador, Peru,, Uruguay and Venezuela	
AfroBasket	Worldwide (via Courtside 1891; except China and Middle East & North Africa)		
AfroBasket qualification	Worldwide (via Courtside 1891; except China and Middle East & North Africa)		
FIBA Men's Olympic Qualifying	Worldwide (via Courtside 1891; except China and Middle East & North Africa)	Local TV broadcaster in Japan	
FIBA Under-19 Basketball World Cup	Worldwide (via Courtside 1891; except China and Middle East & North Africa)		
FIBA Under-17 Basketball World Cup	Worldwide (via Courtside 1891; except China and Middle East & North Africa)		
FIBA Women's Basketball World Cup	Worldwide (via Courtside 1891; except China and Middle East & North Africa)	Local TV broadcaster in Chile, Colombia, Ecuador, Peru,, Uruguay and Venezuela	
FIBA Women's World Cup Qualification	Worldwide (via Courtside 1891; except China and Middle East & North Africa)		
EuroBasket Women	Worldwide (via Courtside 1891; except China and Middle East & North Africa)	Local TV broadcaster in Chile, Colombia, Ecuador, Italy, Japan, Peru,, Uruguay and Venezuela	
FIBA Women's Asia Cup	Worldwide (via Courtside 1891; except China and Middle East & North Africa)		
FIBA Women's AmeriCup	Worldwide (via Courtside 1891; except China and Middle East & North Africa)		
AfroBasket Women	Worldwide (via Courtside 1891; except China and Middle East & North Africa)		
FIBA Women's Olympic Qualifying	Worldwide (via Courtside 1891; except China and Middle East & North Africa)		
FIBA Under-19 Women's Basketball World Cup	Worldwide (via Courtside 1891; except China and Middle East & North Africa)		
FIBA Under-17 Women's Basketball World Cup	Worldwide (via Courtside 1891; except China and Middle East & North Africa)		
FIBA Intercontinental Cup	Worldwide (via Courtside 1891; except China and Middle East & North Africa)		
NBA	Andorra, Belgium, Japan, (Note: via NBA docomo) Luxembourg, Spain and United States	Minnesota Timberwolves, Indiana Pacers, Cleveland Cavaliers, San Antonio Spurs, Orlando Magic, Memphis Grizzlies, Charlotte Hornets and Detroit Pistons regional rights; New York Knicks and Brooklyn Nets games in New York state via MSG Networks and the YES Network & Washington Wizards games in District of Columbia via Monumental Sports Network	
WNBA	United States	Washington Mystics games in District of Columbia via Monumental Sports Network	
NCAA	Rights to ESPN CBB in Belgium, Bulgaria, Cyprus, Denmark, Finland, Greece, Iceland, Ireland, Italy, Malta, MENA (Middle East and North Africa), Norway, Philippines, Poland, Portugal, Sweden and UK		
Big Ten Conference	Worldwide (except United States). Games originally broadcast by NBC or Peacock in the USA not available in the Caribbean Basin. Games originally broadcast by CBS in the USA not available in Bermuda.		
Big 12 Conference	Worldwide (except United States and Latin America)	Only games originally broadcast by Fox Sports in US	
Mountain West Conference	Worldwide (except United States and Latin America)	Only games originally broadcast by Fox Sports in US	
Grind Session World Championship	Worldwide		
EuroLeague	Chile, Colombia, Ecuador, Italy, Peru,, Uruguay and Venezuela		
EuroCup	Italy		
Basketball Champions League	Worldwide (via Courtside 1891; except China and Middle East & North Africa)	Local TV broadcaster in France, Italy	
EuroLeague Women	Worldwide		
Liga ACB	Andorra, Australia, Belgium, Canada, France, Ireland, Italy, Japan, MENA (Middle East and North Africa), Portugal, San Marino, Spain, United Kingdom, United States and Taiwan		
Copa del Rey	Andorra, Australia, Belgium, Canada, France, Ireland, Italy, Japan, MENA (Middle East and North Africa), Portugal, San Marino, Spain, United Kingdom, United States and Taiwan		
Supercopa de España	Andorra, Australia, Belgium, Canada, France, Ireland, Italy, Japan, MENA (Middle East and North Africa), Portugal, San Marino, Spain, United Kingdom, United States and Taiwan		
Liga U	Andorra, Spain		
LNB Élite	Australia, Austria, Belgium, China, France, Germany, Italy, Japan, Liechtenstein, Luxembourg, MENA, Portugal, San Marino, Switzerland, Taiwan, United Kingdom	Live until 2029	
LNB Pro A Leaders Cup	Australia, Austria, Belgium, China, France, Germany, Italy, Japan, Liechtenstein, Luxembourg, MENA, Portugal, San Marino, Switzerland, Taiwan, United Kingdom	Live until 2029	
Super League Basketball	Worldwide		
Liga Portuguesa de Basquetebol	Worldwide (via Courtside 1891; except China and Middle East & North Africa)	Official broadcaster of all games in Portugal	
Taça de Portugal Masculina	Worldwide (via Courtside 1891; except China and Middle East & North Africa)	Official broadcaster of all games in Portugal	
Taça Hugo dos Santos	Worldwide (via Courtside 1891; except China and Middle East & North Africa)	Official broadcaster of all games in Portugal	
Supertaça Mário Saldanha	Worldwide (via Courtside 1891; except China and Middle East & North Africa)	Official broadcaster of all games in Portugal	
Liga Feminina de Basquetebol	Worldwide (via Courtside 1891; except China and Middle East & North Africa)	Official broadcaster of all games in Portugal	
Taça de Portugal Feminina	Worldwide (via Courtside 1891; except China and Middle East & North Africa)	Official broadcaster of all games in Portugal	
Taça Federação	Worldwide (via Courtside 1891; except China and Middle East & North Africa)	Official broadcaster of all games in Portugal	
Supertaça Feminina	Worldwide (via Courtside 1891; except China and Middle East & North Africa)	Official broadcaster of all games in Portugal	
East Asia Super League	Worldwide (via Courtside 1891; except China and Middle East & North Africa)		
B.League Premier	Worldwide (via Courtside 1891; except China and Middle East & North Africa)	Official broadcaster of all games in Japan	
B.League One	Japan		
Taiwan Professional Basketball League	Taiwan		
Basketball Champions League Americas	Worldwide (via Courtside 1891; except China and Middle East & North Africa)		
Basketball Africa League	Worldwide	Highlights only	

=== Beach soccer ===
Competition	Region	Broadcast Details	Sources
Serie A	Italy		
Coppa Italia	Italy		
Supercoppa Italiana	Italy		
German Beach Soccer League	Austria, Germany, Switzerland		
German Beach Soccer Championship	Austria, Germany, Switzerland		
German Beach Soccer Tour	Austria, Germany, Switzerland		

=== Canadian Football ===
Competition	Region	Broadcast Details	Sources
Canadian Football League	Worldwide (excluding United States)	(begins in 2027); Exclusive rights in Canada to one Saturday night game each week of the regular season and two playoff games Broadcaster of all CFL games outside of Canada and United States, including the Grey Cup game	

=== Chess ===
Competition	Region	Broadcast Details	Sources
Champions Chess Tour	Worldwide		
Global Chess League (2023, 2024)	Worldwide		
Freestyle Chess Grand Slam Tour	Worldwide		
Bullet Chess Championship	Worldwide		
Speed Chess Championship	Worldwide		
Women's Speed Chess Championship	Worldwide		

=== Combat sports ===
Competition	Region	Broadcast Details	Sources
UFC	Austria, Germany, Switzerland		
Golden Boy Promotions	Worldwide	Some cards could be blocked in certain regions	
Matchroom Boxing	Worldwide	Some cards could be blocked in certain regions	
Misfits Boxing	Worldwide		
Brave Combat Federation	Worldwide (excluding Russia)		
Superfights Kickboxing	Brazil, Italy, Spain		
PFL Global	Albania, Andorra, Austria, Belgium, Cambodia, Denmark, Faroe Islands, Fiji, Finland, Germany, Gibraltar, Greece, Greenland, Guernsey, Hungary, Iceland, Indonesia, Ireland, Israel, Italy, Jersey, Kiribati, Macau, Malaysia, Malta, Marshall Islands, Micronesia, Mongolia, Norway, Portugal, Saint Martin, Samoa, Singapore, Slovakia, Solomon Islands, Spain, Sweden, Switzerland, Taiwan, Thailand, Timor-Leste, United Kingdom		
PFL Europe	Anguilla, Antigua and Barbuda, Aruba, Austria, Bahamas, Barbados, Belgium, Bonaire, British Virgin Islands, Brunei, Cambodia, Cayman Islands, Curacao, Cyprus, Denmark, Dominica, Finland, Germany, Grenada, Guadeloupe, Guyana, Haiti, Hong Kong, Hungary, Iceland, Indonesia, Ireland, Israel, Italy, Jamaica, Luxembourg, Macau, Malaysia, Malta, Martinique, Mongolia, Montserrat, Myanmar, Navassa Island, Norway, Portugal, Saba, San Andres and Providencia, Saint Barthelemy, Saint Kitts and Nevis, Saint Lucia, Saint Martin, Saint Vincent and the Grenadines, Singapore, Sint Eustatius, Sint Maarten, Slovakia, Slovenia, Spain, Sweden, Switzerland, Taiwan, Thailand, Timor-Leste, Trinidad and Tobago, Turks and Caicos Islands, United Kingdom		
King of Kings	Worldwide (excluding Estonia, Latvia, Lithuania)		
Bushido MMA	Worldwide (excluding Estonia, Latvia, Lithuania)		
Dream Boxing	Worldwide (excluding Estonia, Latvia, Lithuania)		
Red Owl Boxing	Worldwide		
Overtime Boxing	Worldwide		
MF Pro Boxing	Worldwide		
Top Rank	Worldwide		
Premier Boxing Champions	Worldwide		
Fight Clubbing	Worldwide		
Rajadamnern World Series	Worldwide		
ONE Championship	Italy		
Tasman Fighters	Worldwide		
Miura Boxing	Worldwide (excluding Mexico)		
Westside Promotions	Worldwide		
Broadway Boxing	Worldwide		
Federazione Pugilistica Italiana	Italy		
Glory	Worldwide (excluding Brazil and some other countries)		
Salita Promotions	Worldwide		
Conlan Boxing	Worldwide		
GBM Sports	Worldwide		
MarvNation Promotions	Worldwide		
Team Combat League	Worldwide		
Boxing Insider Promotions	Worldwide		
Top Tier Boxing	Worldwide		
Blockone Sports	Worldwide		
Bare Knuckle Fighting Championship	Worldwide		
Kings Corner	Worldwide		
Boxing 5	Worldwide		
Platform Sports	Worldwide		
Warrior Ascent Promotions	Worldwide		
Champion Spirit	Worldwide		
Queensberry Promotions	Worldwide		
Huge Boxing	Worldwide		
Hexagone MMA	Worldwide		
Groupe Yvon Michel	Worldwide		
Kings Promotions	Worldwide		
Indian Pro Boxing League	Worldwide		
Beatdown Promotions	Worldwide		
Boxlab Promotions	Worldwide		
Muay Thai GP	Worldwide		
Paco Presents Boxing	Worldwide		
Boxing Grand Prix	Worldwide		
Fighting Championship Events	Worldwide		
Legacy Boxing Promotions	Worldwide		
Amir Khan Promotions	Worldwide		
PetrosyanMania	Worldwide		
Nolah Bros Boxing Promotions	Worldwide		
Universum Boxing	Worldwide		
Top Boxing Generation	Worldwide		
IBA Pro	Worldwide		
Ring Magazine Boxing	Worldwide		
Ringside Zone	Worldwide		
Supernova Strikers	Worldwide		
Primetime Boxing	Worldwide		
Grand Sumo Tournament	Worldwide		
Showstar Boxing	Worldwide		
Social Gloves	Worldwide		
PWR Box Promotions	Worldwide		
Trilogy Promotions	Worldwide		
Karate Combat	Chile, Colombia, Ecuador, Peru,, Uruguay and Venezuela		
Enfusion	Chile, Colombia, Ecuador, Peru,, Uruguay and Venezuela		
WGP Kickboxing	Chile, Colombia, Ecuador, Peru,, Uruguay and Venezuela		
Fusion Fighting Championship	Chile, Colombia, Ecuador, Peru,, Uruguay and Venezuela		
Arano Box	Chile, Colombia, Ecuador, Peru,, Uruguay and Venezuela		
Gorilla Promotions	Worldwide		
Usyk17 Promotions	Worldwide		
Extreme Fighting Championship	Worldwide (excluding Sub-Saharan Africa and Poland)		
FightStar Championship	Worldwide		
SENSHI	Worldwide		
Karate Combat	Worldwide		
Hitman Fight League	Worldwide		
Balmoral Group Promotions	Worldwide		
Gamebred Fighting Championship	Worldwide		
Hype Fighting Championship	Worldwide		

=== Cricket ===
Competition	Region	Broadcast Details	Sources
World Test Championship	United Kingdom	Australia vs. Bangladesh 2026 games	

=== Cue sports ===
Competition	Region	Broadcast Details	Sources
World Snooker	Austria, (Note: via Eurosport) Canada, Germany, Italy, Spain, Switzerland, United States	World Snooker Championship only for Austria, Germany and Switzerland	
Championship League Snooker	Brazil, Canada, Italy, Spain, United States		
Champion of Champions	Germany		
Riyadh Season Snooker Championship	Worldwide		
World Masters of Snooker	Worldwide		

=== Curling ===
Competition	Region	Broadcast Details	Sources
Rock League	Worldwide (excluding Canada and United States)		
Grand Slam of Curling	Worldwide (excluding Canada and United States)		

=== Cycling ===
Competition	Region	Broadcast Details	Sources
UCI World Tour	Austria, Chile, Colombia, Ecuador, Germany, Italy, Peru, Spain, Switzerland and Uruguay		
Union Européenne de Cyclisme	Austria, Germany, Italy, Spain, Switzerland		

=== Darts ===
Competition	Region	Broadcast Details	Sources
Professional Darts Corporation	Austria, Germany, Switzerland		

=== Døds diving ===
Competition	Region	Broadcast Details	Sources
DØDS World Tour	Worldwide (excluding Norway, United States, Canada and territories covered by existing domestic and regional broadcast agreements)		

=== Equestrian sports ===
Competition	Region	Broadcast Details	Sources
Global Champions Tour	Worldwide (excluding Czechia, LATAM (ex. Brazil), Middle East and North Africa, Sweden, Slovakia and United States)		
Global Champions League	Worldwide (excluding Czechia, LATAM (ex. Brazil), Middle East and North Africa, Sweden, Slovakia and United States)		

=== Esports ===
Competition	Region	Broadcast Details	Sources
BLAST Premier	Worldwide		
FIFAe World Cup	Worldwide		
eChampions League	Austria, Canada, Germany		
eLaLiga	Spain		
DFB-ePokal	Austria, Germany, Switzerland		
ePro League	Belgium		
Esports World Cup	Worldwide		
TGX Battles	Japan		
Gran Turismo World Series	Worldwide		

=== Fencing ===
Competition	Region	Broadcast Details	Sources
World Fencing League	Worldwide		

=== Field hockey ===
Competition	Region	Broadcast Details	Sources
Men's EuroHockey Championship	Belgium, Luxembourg		
Women's EuroHockey Championship	Belgium, Luxembourg		
Euro Hockey League	Austria, Germany, Switzerland		

=== Fishing ===
Competition	Region	Broadcast Details	Sources
Fish'O'Mania	Germany		

=== Fitness racing ===
Competition	Region	Broadcast Details	Sources
HYROX Elite Series	Spain	Only London and Hamburg events	

=== Five-a-side football ===
Competition	Region	Broadcast Details	Sources
FIFA Futsal World Cup qualification (UEFA)	Germany		
AFC Futsal Asian Cup	Austria, Germany, Japan, Switzerland		
Intercontinental Futsal Cup	Spain		
UEFA Futsal Champions League	Portugal, Spain		
Liga Prime Futsal	Spain		
Futsal-Bundesliga	Austria, Germany, Switzerland		
German Women's Futsal Championship	Austria, Germany, Switzerland		
AFC Futsal Club Championship	Japan		
World Sevens Football	Worldwide		
Soccer7sSeries	Worldwide		

=== Flag Football ===
Competition	Region	Broadcast Details	Sources
IFAF Flag Football World Championships	Worldwide		
IFAF European Flag Football Championship	Worldwide		
IFAF Asia-Oceania Flag Football Championships	Worldwide		
IFAF Americas Continental Flag Football Championship	Worldwide		
IFAF Africa Flag Football Championship	Worldwide		

=== Golf ===
Competition	Region	Broadcast Details	Sources
PGA Tour	Italy, Middle East & North Africa (via PGA Tour Pass), and Southeast Asia (via PGA Tour Pass)		
PGA Championship	Japan		
JLPGA	Japan		
LIV Golf	Worldwide		

=== Handball ===
Competition	Region	Broadcast Details	Sources
Liga ASOBAL	Spain		

=== Horse racing ===
Competition	Region	Broadcast Details	Sources
The Everest	Worldwide		
TAIF Racing Season	Worldwide		
Caulfield Cup	Worldwide		

=== Ice hockey ===
Competition	Region	Broadcast Details	Sources
National Hockey League	Worldwide via NHL.TV; excluding United States, Australia, Belgium, Brazil, Canada, Caribbean, Greece, Hungary, Italy, Latin America, Malta, Netherlands, New Zealand, Nordics (Denmark, Iceland, Finland, Norway, Sweden), Romania, San Marino, Spain	Some live games are blacked out in Germany, Austria, and Switzerland, and become available on-demand following the conclusion of the game; New York Rangers, New Jersey Devils, New York Islanders and Buffalo Sabres games available in New York state via MSG Networks and the YES Network; Washington Capitals games in District of Columbia via Monumental Sports Network & Los Angeles Kings games in Southern California via ABTV	

=== Indoor football ===
Competition	Region	Broadcast Details	Sources
Infinity League	Worldwide		
Kings League	Belgium, Portugal		
Kings World Cup Nations	Worldwide (excluding Brazil, Israel, LATAM, MENA, and United States)		
Kings World Cup Clubs	Worldwide (excluding Brazil, Israel, LATAM, MENA, and United States)		

=== Motorsport ===
Competition	Region	Broadcast Details	Sources
Formula One	Andorra, Malaysia, Portugal, Spain, Singapore		
Formula 2	Andorra, Malaysia, Portugal, Spain, Singapore		
Formula 3	Andorra, Malaysia, Portugal, Spain, Singapore		
Porsche Supercup	Andorra, Malaysia, Portugal, Spain, Singapore		
F1 Academy	Andorra, Malaysia, Portugal, Spain, Singapore		
Formula Regional European Championship	Worldwide		
Italian F4 Championship	Worldwide		
F4 Spanish Championship	Worldwide		
Eurocup-3	Worldwide		
MotoGP	Andorra, Spain	Live until 2031 in Portugal and until 2030 in Spain	
Asia Talent Cup	Spain		
British Talent Cup	Spain		
FIM JuniorGP	Spain		
WorldSBK	Andorra, Portugal, Spain	Live until 2031 in Portugal	
MXGP	Italy, Spain		
Extreme H	Worldwide		
Dakar Rally	France, Italy, Spain		
WEC	Austria, France, Germany, Italy, Spain, Switzerland	Only 24 Hours of Le Mans in France	
FIM EWC	Italy, Spain		
eSkootr Championship	Worldwide		
World Supercross Championship	Worldwide		
Airspeeder	Worldwide	On Demand only	
Taiwan Spirit Rider	Taiwan		
DTM	Belgium, Czech Republic, France, Hungary, Israel, Malaysia, Singapore, Slovakia, South Korea, Spain		
ADAC GT Masters	Worldwide		
ADAC GT4 Germany	Worldwide		
BMW M2 Cup	Belgium, Czech Republic, France, Hungary, Israel, Malaysia, Singapore, Slovakia, South Korea, Spain		
European Truck Racing Championship	Worldwide		
NASCAR Cup Series	Spain		
NASCAR Xfinity Series	Spain		
NASCAR Craftsman Truck Series	Spain		
NASCAR Euro Series	Worldwide		
Supercars Championship	Spain		
World Rally Championship	Worldwide (via Rally.TV; except China, Estonia, Finland, France, Hong Kong, Ireland, Japan, Latvia, Lithuania, Poland, Sweden, United Kingdom)		
World RX	Worldwide (via Rally.TV; except China, Estonia, Finland, France, Hong Kong, Ireland, Japan, Latvia, Lithuania, Poland, Sweden, United Kingdom)		
European Rally Championship	Worldwide (via Rally.TV; except China, Estonia, Finland, France, Hong Kong, Ireland, Japan, Latvia, Lithuania, Poland, Sweden, United Kingdom)		
Iberian Supercars	Portugal, Spain		
Supercars Jarama RACE	Portugal, Spain		
Campeonato de Portugal de Velocidade	Portugal, Spain		
WorldWCR	Spain		
E1 Series	Worldwide		
Speed Tour	Worldwide		
Porsche Sprint Challenge Southern Europe	Worldwide		
Ferrari Challenge Europe	Worldwide		
Goodwood Road Racing Club	Worldwide		
Porsche Carrera Cup Germany	Worldwide		
Ferrari Challenge Japan	Worldwide		
ADAC RAVENOL 24h Nürburgring	Worldwide		
TCR Europe	Worldwide		
International GT Open	Worldwide		
Euroformula Open	Worldwide		
GT Cup Open Europe	Worldwide		
TCR Spain	Portugal, Spain		
Australian Supercross Championship	Worldwide		
Rotax Max Challenge	Worldwide		
TCR World Tour	Worldwide (excluding China, Hungary and South Korea)		
European Le Mans Series	Argentina, Chile, Mexico and Spain		
Le Mans Cup	Argentina, Chile, Mexico and Spain		

=== Mountain bike racing ===
Competition	Region	Broadcast Details	Sources
Titan World Series	Worldwide	Only highlights	

=== Multi-sport ===
Competition	Region	Broadcast Details	Sources
Summer Olympic Games	Austria, Germany, Italy, Spain, Switzerland		
Winter Olympic Games	Austria, Germany, Italy, Spain, Switzerland		
Islamic Solidarity Games	Worldwide		

=== Open water swimming ===
Competition	Region	Broadcast Details	Sources
OCEANMAN Elite Race World Final Championship	Worldwide		

=== Padel ===
Competition	Region	Broadcast Details	Sources
Premier Padel	Malaysia, Singapore		
Hexagon Cup	Worldwide (excluding United States)		
Pro Padel League	Worldwide		
Reserve Cup	Worldwide		
World Padel League	Worldwide		

=== Pickleball ===
Competition	Region	Broadcast Details	Sources
Mediterranean Open	Spain		

=== Professional wrestling ===
Competition	Region	Broadcast Details	Sources
All Elite Wrestling	Worldwide (excluding India, Hungary, the British Indian Ocean Territory, North Korea, Russia, territories of the United States, Nigeria, South Africa, Costa Rica, El Salvador, Guatemala, Honduras, Mexico, Nicaragua, Panama, Iran, Afghanistan, Bangladesh, Bhutan, the Maldives, Myanmar, Nepal, Sri Lanka and Vietnam)	PPVs only	

=== Robot fighting ===
Competition	Region	Broadcast Details	Sources
National Havoc Robot League	Worldwide		

=== Roller hockey ===
Competition	Region	Broadcast Details	Sources
WSE Champions League	Portugal		
Portuguese Roller Hockey First Division	Portugal		
Portuguese Roller Hockey Cup	Portugal		
Supertaça António Livramento	Portugal		
Supertaça de Portugal Feminino	Portugal		
Elite Cup Masculina	Portugal		
Elite Cup Feminina	Portugal		

=== Rugby league ===
Competition	Region	Broadcast Details	Sources
National Rugby League	Worldwide (excluding Australia, New Zealand and Papua New Guinea)	Starting 2028	

=== Rugby sevens ===
Competition	Region	Broadcast Details	Sources
Ultimate Sevens Championship	Worldwide		

=== Rugby union ===
Competition	Region	Broadcast Details	Sources
World Rugby Nations Cup	Portugal	Only Portugal games	
Top10	Chile, Colombia, Ecuador, Italy, Peru,, Uruguay and Venezuela		
Serie A Elite Femminile	Italy		
Top 14	Italy, Japan		
European Rugby Champions Cup	Baltics, Benelux, Brazil, Caribbean, DACH region, Italy, Japan, Middle East and North Africa (MENA), Nordics, Pacific Islands, Poland and Romania.		
EPCR Challenge Cup	Baltics, Benelux, Brazil, Caribbean, DACH region, Italy, Japan, Middle East and North Africa (MENA), Nordics, Pacific Islands, Poland and Romania.		
Women's Elite Rugby	Worldwide		
Legacy Cup	Worldwide		
Asahi Super Dry Pacific Nations Cup	Japan		
Torneo de Córdoba	Chile, Colombia, Ecuador, Peru,, Uruguay and Venezuela		
Torneo del Litoral	Chile, Colombia, Ecuador, Peru,, Uruguay and Venezuela		
Torneo del Noroeste	Chile, Colombia, Ecuador, Peru,, Uruguay and Venezuela		
Torneo del Oeste	Chile, Colombia, Ecuador, Peru,, Uruguay and Venezuela		

=== Sailing ===
Competition	Region	Broadcast Details	Sources
SailGP	Malaysia, Singapore		
The Ocean Race Atlantic	Worldwide		

=== Skateboarding ===
Competition	Region	Broadcast Details	Sources
World Downhill Skateboarding Championship	Worldwide		

=== Softball ===
Competition	Region	Broadcast Details	Sources
Men's Softball World Cup	Worldwide (excluding Armenia, Azerbaijan, Belarus, Georgia, Japan, Kazakhstan, Kyrgyzstan, Mexico, Moldova, Russia, South Korea, Taiwan, Tajikistan, Turkmenistan, Ukraine and Uzbekistan)		
Women's Softball World Cup	Worldwide (excluding Armenia, Azerbaijan, Belarus, Georgia, Japan, Kazakhstan, Kyrgyzstan, Mexico, Moldova, Russia, South Korea, Taiwan, Tajikistan, Turkmenistan, Ukraine and Uzbekistan)		
Olympic softball tournament	Worldwide (excluding Armenia, Azerbaijan, Belarus, Georgia, Japan, Kazakhstan, Kyrgyzstan, Mexico, Moldova, Russia, South Korea, Taiwan, Tajikistan, Turkmenistan, Ukraine and Uzbekistan)		

=== Squash ===
Competition	Region	Broadcast Details	Sources
PSA World Tour	Japan		
National Squash League	Worldwide (excluding Argentina, Bolivia, Chile, Colombia, Costa Rica, Dominican Republic, Ecuador, El Salvador, Guatemala, Honduras, Mexico, Nicaragua, Panama, Paraguay, Peru, Uruguay and Venezuela)		

=== Surf racing ===
Competition	Region	Broadcast Details	Sources
Guardians League	Worldwide		

=== Swimming ===
Competition	Region	Broadcast Details	Sources
College Swimming League	Worldwide (excluding United States)		

=== Table Tennis ===
Competition	Region	Broadcast Details	Sources
World Table Tennis	France		
Major League Table Tennis	Worldwide		

=== Tennis ===
Competition	Region	Broadcast Details	Sources
Australian Open	Austria, Germany, Italy, Spain, Switzerland		
French Open	Austria, Germany, Italy, Malaysia, Singapore, Spain, Switzerland		
WTA Tour	Canada, Japan, Middle East & North Africa, Norway, Portugal		
Davis Cup	Austria, Chile, Colombia, Ecuador, Germany, Peru,, Uruguay and Venezuela		
Ultimate Tennis Showdown	Canada, Japan, Italy, Spain		
Laver Cup	Austria, Germany, Italy, Switzerland		

=== Triathlon ===
Competition	Region	Broadcast Details	Sources
PTO Tour	APAC, Australia, Brazil, Canada, Japan, Latin América, Middle East & North Africa, New Zealand and Sub-Saharan Africa		
IRONMAN Pro Series	Worldwide (excluding Canada, Caribbean, China, Latin America, Russia, United States)		
Supertri E	Worldwide		

=== Ultramarathon ===
Competition	Region	Broadcast Details	Sources
UTMB World Series	Worldwide		

=== Volleyball ===
Competition	Region	Broadcast Details	Sources
FIVB Men's Volleyball Nations League	Italy		
FIVB Women's Volleyball Nations League	Italy		
CEV Champions League	Italy		
CEV Cup	Italy		
CEV Challenge Cup	Italy		
CEV Women's Champions League	Italy		
Women's CEV Cup	Italy		
CEV Women's Challenge Cup	Italy		
Italian Volleyball League	Italy		
Italian Women's Volleyball League	Italy		
Coppa Italia	Italy		
Supercoppa Italiana	Italy		
Enterprise Volleyball League	Taiwan		
LOVB Pro	Worldwide	16 matches per season	

=== Weightlifting ===
Competition	Region	Broadcast Details	Sources
European Weightlifting Federation	Spain		

=== Winter sports ===
Competition	Region	Broadcast Details	Sources
FIL	Austria, Germany, Switzerland		
FIS	Austria, Germany, Italy, Spain, Switzerland		
IBU	Austria, France, Germany, Italy, Spain, Switzerland		
ISU	Italy, Spain		

== Linear channels ==
Linear channels on DAZN include:

Channel	Region	Broadcast Details	Sources
beIN Sports 1	Malaysia, Singapore		
beIN Sports 2	Malaysia, Singapore		
beIN Sports 3	Malaysia, Singapore		
DAZN 1	Austria, Belgium, France, Germany, Ireland, Italy, Luxembourg, Switzerland, Spain, Portugal, Taiwan, United Kingdom, United States		
DAZN 2	Austria, Belgium, Germany, Luxembourg, Spain, Portugal, Taiwan		
DAZN 3	Belgium, Luxembourg, Spain, Portugal, Taiwan		
DAZN 4	Spain, Portugal		
DAZN 5	Portugal		
DAZN 6	Portugal		
DAZN Baloncesto	Spain		
DAZN Baloncesto 2	Spain		
DAZN Baloncesto 3	Spain		
DAZN Darts x Pluto TV	Austria, Germany, Switzerland		
DAZN F1	Spain		
DAZN LaLiga	Spain		
DAZN LaLiga 2	Spain		
DAZN LaLiga 3	Spain		
DAZN LaLiga 4	Spain		
DAZN LaLiga 5	Spain		
DAZN MotoGP	Spain		
DAZN Pro League 1	Belgium, Luxembourg		
DAZN Pro League 2	Belgium, Luxembourg		
DAZN Pro League 3	Belgium, Luxembourg		
DFB.TV	Austria, Germany, Switzerland		
DSports	Chile, Colombia, Ecuador, Peru, Uruguay and Venezuela		
Eurosport 1	Austria, Germany, Italy, Switzerland, Spain		
Eurosport 2	Austria, Germany, Italy, Switzerland, Spain		
Fubo Sports	Canada, United States		
Inter TV	Italy		
La Chaîne L'Équipe	France		
LaLiga TV Hypermotion	Spain		
LFC TV	Japan		
Milan TV	Italy		
MLB Network	Austria, Canada, Germany, Switzerland		
MSG Network	United States (New York)		
NBA TV	Germany		
NFL Network	Worldwide	excluding United States	
Radio TV Serie A con RDS	Italy		
Rally TV	Worldwide	excluding China, Estonia, Finland, France, Hong Kong, Ireland, Japan, Latvia, Lithuania, Poland, Sweden, United Kingdom	
Red Bull TV	Worldwide		
Sportdigital Fussball	Austria, Germany, Switzerland		
Unbeaten	Worldwide		
YES Network	United States (New York)		
