= Olivais =

Olivais may refer to:

- Olivais, Lisbon, a parish of Lisbon, Portugal
  - Olivais (Lisbon Metro), a station on the Lisbon Metro
- Santo António dos Olivais, a parish of Coimbra, Portugal
- Olivais Futebol Clube, a Portuguese sports club
- Olivais e Moscavide, a Portuguese football club

== See also ==
- Olivas
