= Chelsie Schweers =

American basketball player

Personal information
- Born: June 11, 1989 (age 37) Chesapeake, Virginia
- Listed height: 170 cm (5 ft 7 in)

Career information
- High school: Hickory
- College: Christopher Newport (2007–2011)
- Playing career: 2012–2021
- Position: Guard
- Number: 11, 12, 23

Career history
- 2012: Panathinaikos
- 2013: Toowoomba
- 2014: Hamar
- 2014–2015: Ipswich Force
- 2015: Stjarnan
- 2015–2016: Haukar
- 2016: Hobart Chargers
- 2016–2017: CAB Madeira
- 2018: Sutherland Sharks
- 2019: Eltham Wildcats
- 2020–2021: AD Vagos

Career highlights
- QBL Most Valuable Player (2015); Waratah League Most Valuable Player (2018); 3x QBL All League Team (2013–2015); Úrvalsdeild scoring champion (2016); SEABL scoring champion (2016); Waratah League scoring champion (2018)

Chelsie Alexa Schweers (born June 11, 1989) is an American former basketball player. She played college basketball for Christopher Newport before playing professionally for ten years.

== College ==
Schweers played for Christopher Newport from 2007 to 2011, leaving as the school's all-time leader in scoring and three-pointers made. In 2017, she inducted into the USA South Conference Hall of Fame.

== Club career ==
Schweers' first professional stop was with Panathinaikos in the Greek A1 Ethniki in January 2012. In 12 games with the club, Schweers averaged 13.0 points and 26.0 minutes per game.

She signed with Toowoomba in the QBL in 2013, and went on to average 28.2 points per game and earn selection in the QBL All League Team.

Schweers signed with Hamar of the Úrvalsdeild kvenna in January 2014, replacing Di´Amber Johnson. On February 26, 2014, Schweers scored 54 points in a victory against Keflavík. After the Úrvalsdeild season ended, Schweers signed with the Ipswich Force of the Queensland Basketball League.

In 2016, Schweers signed with the Hobart Chargers of the SEABL where she led the league in scoring and three-point percentage.

In June 2016, Schweers returned to the Úrvalsdeild and signed with Stjarnan. On November, Scwheers had a triple-double against Valur. On December 1, Stjarnan announced that Schweers would miss the rest of the year due to a broken hand and that she had played the last three games with the injury. On December 29, Stjarnan released Schweers, despite her leading the league in scoring with 31.0 points per game, citing her injury and Stjarnan's need for a point guard. On January 8, she signed with Úrvalsdeild club Haukar. On March 4, Haukar released Schweers after averaging 22.0 points in 7 games. In 16 games for both teams, she averaged a league leading 27.1 points per game.

She spent the 2016–2017 season with CAB Madeira in Portugal's Liga Feminina, averaging 15.9 points and 4.5 rebounds.

In April 2018, Schweers joined Sutherland Sharks of the Waratah League. On August 15, she was named the Waratah League Most Valuable Player after averaging league leading 29.6 points along with 6.0 rebounds and 4.4 assists for the season.

In February 2019, Schweers signed with the Eltham Wildcats of the Australian NBL1. In 20 games for the Wildcats, Schweers averaged 23.1 points and 4.3 rebounds.

Schweers spent the 2020–2021 season with AD Vagos where she averaged 19.4 points, 4.4 rebounds and 2.9 assists in 20 games in the Liga Feminina de Basquetebol.

== Awards, titles and accomplishments ==
=== Individual awards ===
- QBL Most Valuable Player: 2015
- QBL All League Team (3): 2013, 2014, 2015
- Waratah League Most Valuable Player: 2018

=== Accomplishments ===
- USA South Athletic Conference Hall of Fame: 2017
- Úrvalsdeild kvenna scoring champion: 2016
- SEABL scoring champion: 2016
- Waratah League scoring champion: 2018
