= 2024–25 Liga Feminina de Basquetebol =

Women's basketball league in Portugal

Liga Feminina de Basquetebol
- Season: 2024–25
- Dates: Regular season: 5 October 2024 – 30 March 2025; Play Offs: 5 April – 11 May 2025
- Teams: 12

Regular season
- Season MVP: (Brazil) Raphaella Monteiro

Finals
- Champions: SL Benfica (4th title)
- Runners-up: Esgueira Aveiro
- Finals MVP: (Brazil) Raphaella Monteiro

Statistical leaders
Points	(United States) Becca Wann-Taylor	21.4
Rebounds	(United States) Becca Wann-Taylor	14.0
Assists	(Portugal) Carolina Anacleto	7.7
Steals	(Portugal) Gabriela Raimundo	3.7
Blocks	(United States) Dayna Rouse	1.0

The 2024–25 Liga Feminina de Basquetebol is the 68th season of the top division women's basketball league in Portugal since its establishment in 1955. It starts in October 2024 with the first round of the regular season and ends in May 2025.

SL Benfica are the defending champions.

SL Benfica won their fourth title after beating Esgueira Aveiro in the final.

== Format ==
Each team plays each other twice. The top eight teams qualify for the play offs where every round is held as a best of three series.

== Regular season ==
Pos	Team	Pld	W	L	PF	PA	PD	Pts	Qualification
1	Esgueira Aveiro	22	20	2	1677	1362	+315	42	Play Offs
2	SL Benfica	22	18	4	1736	1259	+477	40	Play Offs
3	GDESSA Barreiro	22	16	6	1533	1359	+174	38	Play Offs
4	Sportiva/AzorisHotels	22	14	8	1403	1372	+31	36 (Note: Sportiva/AzorisHotels 122–113 Galitos FFonseca)	Play Offs
5	Galitos FFonseca	22	14	8	1468	1417	+51	36	Play Offs
6	Quinta dos Lombos	22	13	9	1579	1376	+203	35	Play Offs
7	Imortal Tcars	22	11	11	1588	1517	+71	33	Play Offs
8	Basquete Barcelos HMMotors	22	9	13	1533	1652	−119	31	Play Offs
9	CAB Madeira	22	7	15	1455	1572	−117	29	
10	Sanjoanense	22	6	16	1406	1592	−186	28	
11	Natação	22	3	19	1301	1694	−393	25	Relegation
12	ABTF Betão Vagos	22	1	21	1297	1804	−507	23	Relegation

Source: Liga Feminina de Basquetebol
Rules for classification: 1) Points; 2) Points difference; 3) Points scored.

== Play offs ==
Quarterfinals
1	Esgueira Aveiro	67	74	2
8	Basquete Barcelos HMMotors	64	70	0
4	Sportiva/AzorisHotels	60	56	2
5	Galitos FFonseca	57	46	0
2	SL Benfica	73	81	2
7	Imortal Tcars	52	69	0
3	GDESSA Barreiro	55	63	0
6	Quinta dos Lombos	57	65	2

Semifinals
1	Esgueira Aveiro	63	74	2
4	Sportiva/AzorisHotels	47	63	0
2	SL Benfica	64	67	67	2
6	Quinta dos Lombos	74	52	62	1

Final
1	Esgueira Aveiro	73	75	0
2	SL Benfica	80	78	2

Champions of Portugal

SL Benfica
Fourth title
