= Olivas =

Olivas is a surname. Notable people with the surname include:

- Alfredo Olivas (born 1994), ranchera, Norteña, Corrido singer/songwriter and accordion player
- Daniel Olivas (born 1959), United States author and attorney
- Elvira Olivas (born 1935), Mexican politician from the Institutional Revolutionary Party
- Francisco José Olivas (born 1988), known as Kiko, Spanish professional footballer
- John D. Olivas (born 1965), American engineer and a former NASA astronaut
- José Luis Olivas (1952–2025), Spanish politician of the People's Party
- Ramón Otoniel Olivas (born 1968), retired Nicaraguan footballer and currently football manager
- Sal Olivas (born 1946), American football player

== See also ==
- Olivas Adobe in Ventura, California, an adobe structure built in 1841 by Raymundo Olivas
- Fidel Olivas Escudero District, one of eight districts of the province Mariscal Luzuriaga in Peru
- Camp Olivas, regional headquarters of the Philippine National Police (PNP) in Region 3: Central Luzon
- Cinco Olivas, municipality located in the province of Zaragoza, Aragon, Spain
- Oliva
- Olivais (disambiguation)
- Olivares (disambiguation)
- Olivarius
