= Schweers =

Schweers is a surname. Notable people with the surname include:

- Chelsie Schweers (born 1989), American basketball player
- Lion Schweers (born 1996), German footballer
- Verena Schweers (born 1989), German footballer

== See also ==
- Schwiers
