= Schwiers =

Schwiers is a surname. Notable people with the surname include:

- Ellen Schwiers (1930–2019), German actress
- Jasmin Schwiers (born 1982), German actress

== See also ==
- Schweers
