= Portuguese Women's Basketball Super Cup =

The Portuguese Women's Basketball Supercup is the Final between winner Championship and winner/finalist of the Portuguese Cup, which is also called (Portuguese: "Supertaça de Portugal de Basquetebol Feminino") and it is organized by the FPB (Portuguese: Federação Portuguesa de Basquetebol)

== Portuguese Supercup winners ==
Season	Final
Season	Winners	Result	Runners-up
1985–86	CIF
1986–87	Sport Algés e Dafundo
1987–88	CIF
1988–89	CIF
1989–90	CD Estrelas da Avenida
1990–91	CD Estrelas da Avenida
1991–92	CD Estrelas da Avenida	77–64	CIF
1992–93	CD Estrelas da Avenida	51–43	Académico FC
1993–94	União Desportivo de Santarém	59–56	CD Estrelas da Avenida
1994–95	CD Estrelas da Avenida	87–60	União Desportivo de Santarém
1995–96	CAB Madeira	59–50	Olivais FC
1996–97	CAB Madeira	64–60	União Desportivo de Santarém
1997–98	União Desportivo de Santarém	80–64	CAB Madeira
1998–99	Olivais FC	62–53	União Desportivo de Santarém
1999–00	CAB Madeira	69–50	Nacional da Madeira
2000–01	CD Póvoa	76–63	CAB Madeira
2001–02	Santarém Basket	80–70	CAB Madeira
2002–03	Santarém Basket	80–71	CAB Madeira
2003–04	CAB Madeira	72–68	Santarém Basket
2004–05	Escola Sec. de Santo André	86–49	Santarém Basket
2005–06	Escola Sec. de Santo André	79–59	CAB Madeira
2006–07	CAB Madeira	77–63	Boa Viagem
2007–08	CAB Madeira	86–66	Escola Sec. de Santo André
2008–09	Olivais FC	60–59	AD Vagos
2009–10	AD Vagos	65–58	Olivais FC
2010–11	Olivais FC	51–49	AD Vagos
2011–12	Sport Algés e Dafundo	68–57	CR Quinta dos Lombos
2012–13	Sport Algés e Dafundo	66–64	AD Vagos
2013–14	Sport Algés e Dafundo	68–62	CAB Madeira
2014–15	CAB Madeira	75–71	CR Quinta dos Lombos
2015–16	Clube União Sportiva	76–57	CAB Madeira
2016–17	Clube União Sportiva	69–56	Olivais FC
