= Jardim da Manga =

Structure in Coimbra, Portugal

Coordinates: 40°12′41″N 8°25′40″W

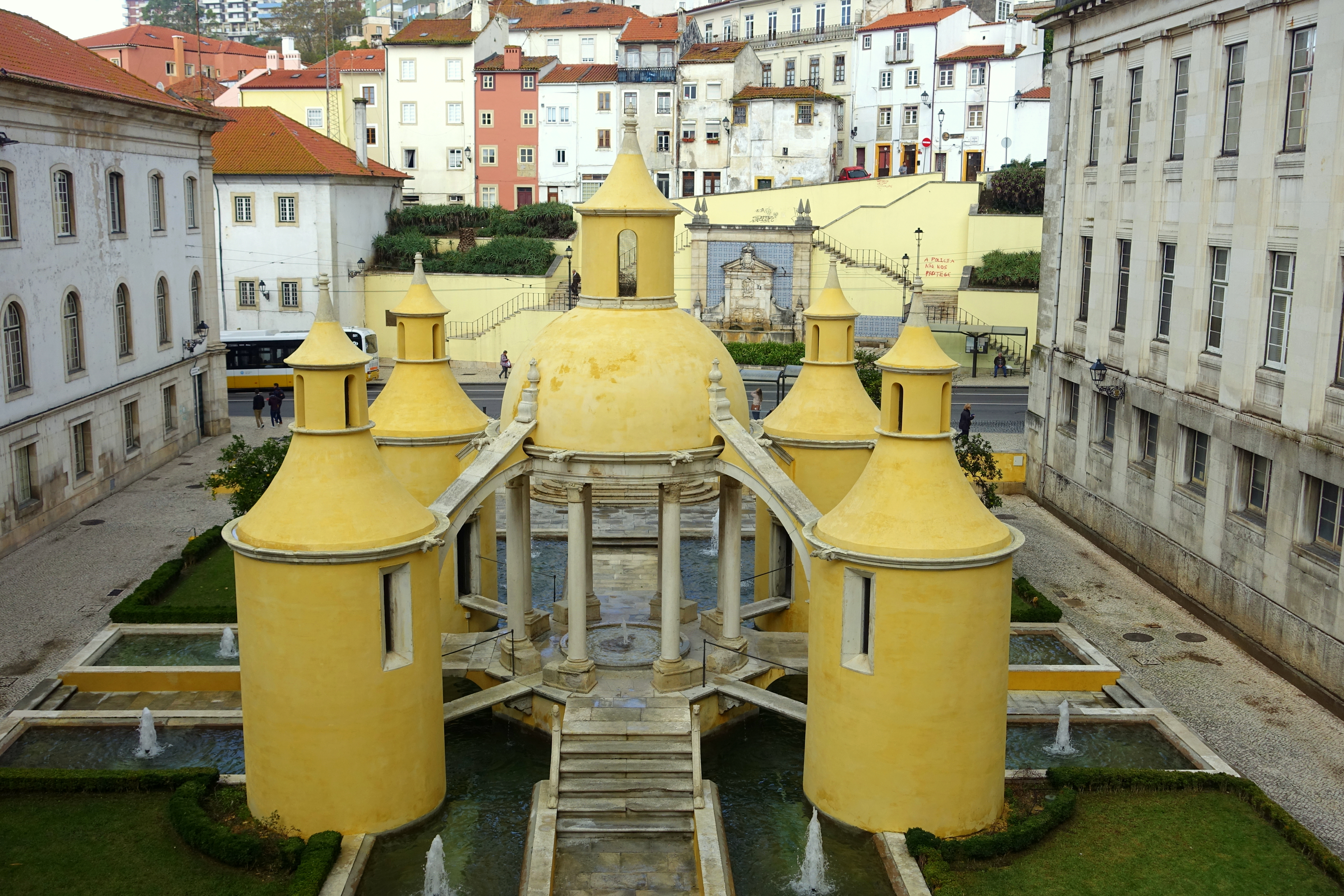
Jardim da Manga

The Jardim da Manga, also known as Cloister of Manga, is a Renaissance architectural work with fountains, located behind the Santa Cruz Monastery in Coimbra, Portugal. It has been classified as a National Monument since 1934.

The garden and its structures dates back to 1528, when it was built as the monastery's fountain. It is dominated by a building, which currently has only a central dome sitting on eight columns, with its fountain, connected to four small chapels, surrounded by small rectangular pools. These water features were inspired by Arabic architecture. The chapels contain the remains of three small altarpieces attributed to João de Ruão.
