= Santa Cruz (Coimbra) =

- Civil parish
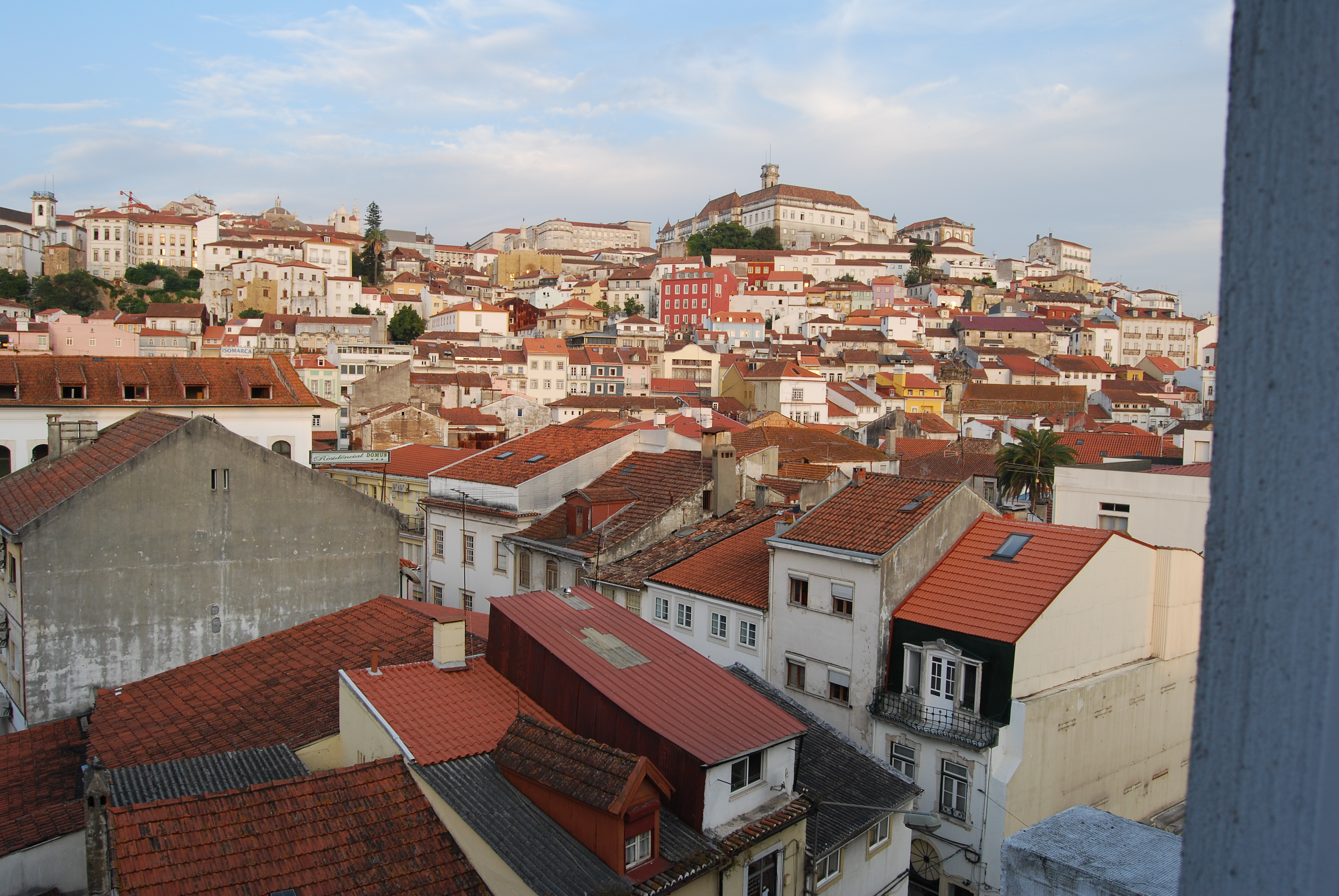
- The urbanized area of Santa Cruz extending towards University Hill in the old quarter of Coimbra

- Location in Portugal
- Coordinates: 40°13′40″N 8°26′46″W
- Country: Portugal
- Region: Centro
- Intermunic. comm.: Região de Coimbra
- District: Coimbra
- Municipality: Coimbra
- Established: Settlement: c. 1131; Parish: fl. 1139; Civil parish: c. 1835
- Disbanded: 2013

Area
  - Total: 5.56 km^{2} (2.15 sq mi)
- Elevation: 24 m (79 ft)

Population (2011)
  - Total: 5,699
  - Density: 1,020/km^{2} (2,650/sq mi)
- Time zone: UTC+00:00 (WET)
  - Summer (DST): UTC+01:00 (WEST)
- Postal code: 3000-317
- Area code: 239
- Website: www.freguesiadesantacruz.eu

Santa Cruz is a former civil parish in the municipality of Coimbra, Portugal. In 2013, the parish merged into the new parish Coimbra (Sé Nova, Santa Cruz, Almedina e São Bartolomeu). In 2001, its population was 6866 inhabitants, in an area of 5.56 km^{2} that parallels the north (right) margin of the Mondego River, extending to the village of Adémia in Trouxemil (its density is approximately 1235 inhabitants per km^{2}).

== History ==
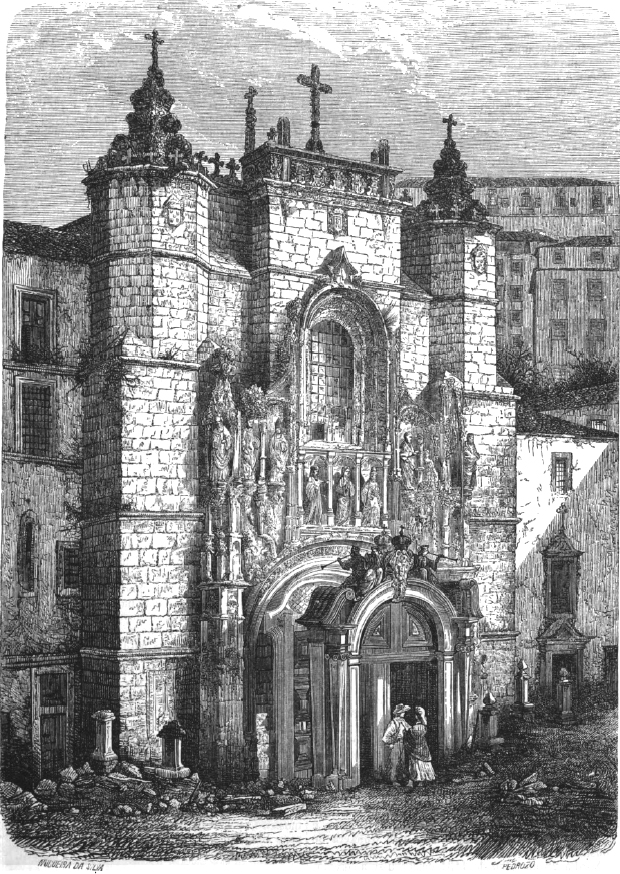
An engraving of the Monastery of Santa Cruz, as it appeared in the 19th century, when it was an abandoned derelict

After the Christian conquest from the Moors, Afonso Henriques moved the capital of the kingdom from Guimarães to Coimbra, a strategic location and point of departure for future incursions into the Muslim south.

Afonso Henriques sought the influential support of the Augustinian canons, such as Dom Telo, Dom Teotónio of Bragança and Dom João Peculiar, who from the Romanesque Monastery of Santa Cruz, contributed to the transformation of the city into an important cultural nucleus of the kingdom. Constructed in an area outside the gates of the old city, from 1131, the old monastery was built in the area called Banhos Régios (Portuguese: royal baths). The monastery, later, had an important influence on the diplomatic battle between Afonso Henriques, the Kingdom of Castile and León and the Holy See for the recognition of Kingdom. The delimitation of the historical parochia of Santa Cruz actually occurred before the recognition of the Kingdom, around 1137-1139. The masters of the monastery, such as Fernando Martins de Bulhão (later Anthony of Padua), helped motivate the cultural development of the nation's nobility, profoundly reformulated during the reign of Manuel I.

King John III developed the area of Santa Cruz by transferring, definitively, to Coimbra the University, under the administration of friar Brás de Braga; this resulted initially in the construction of the Manga Garden, but was followed by the opening of the Rua da Sofia, which became the centre of many of the religious orders of the Kingdom. What followed was a period of construction, with establishment of many of the religious Colégios (colleges), such as the Colleges of São Miguel, Todos-os–Santos, São Bernardo, São Boaventura, São Domingos, São Tomás, Carmo, Graça and São Pedro), designed to mould members of the nobility and landed gentry. Its clerical beginnings was the basis for the civil parish coat-of-arms; this includes the books of Santa Cruz, the Crowns of the first Kings of Portugal, and the Holy Cross, representing its toponymy.

In addition the historical Church of Santa Cruz (Portuguese: Igreja de Santa Cruz), the Chapel of São João das Donas, Church of Santa Justa, the Madalena and Nova Fountains, Fonte da Madalena e Fonte Nova, Inquisition Courtyard, and many aspects of the medieval architectural motifs were first established during this period.

In Pedrulha, for example, there were a pillory Cross (from the 16th century), the Marco do Bolão, the Church of Nossa Senhora da Visitação, the Chapel of São Simão and Passarinhos Fountain (all created in the 17th century) were established during this period.

The existence of the Jewish quarter, within the limits of its territory (around Rua Nova) was a decisive factor in the development of the mercantile community (even as Manuel I impeded their religious liberties). In the areas of Praça 8 de Maio, Rua da Louça, Rua da Moeda, Rua da Sofia, Pátio da Inquisição and Largo dos Oleiros the merchant classes thrived, resulting in the establishment of the Municipal Market, shops, banking institutions, offices, medical practives, bookstores, kiosks, café, restaurants and taverns.

== Geography ==
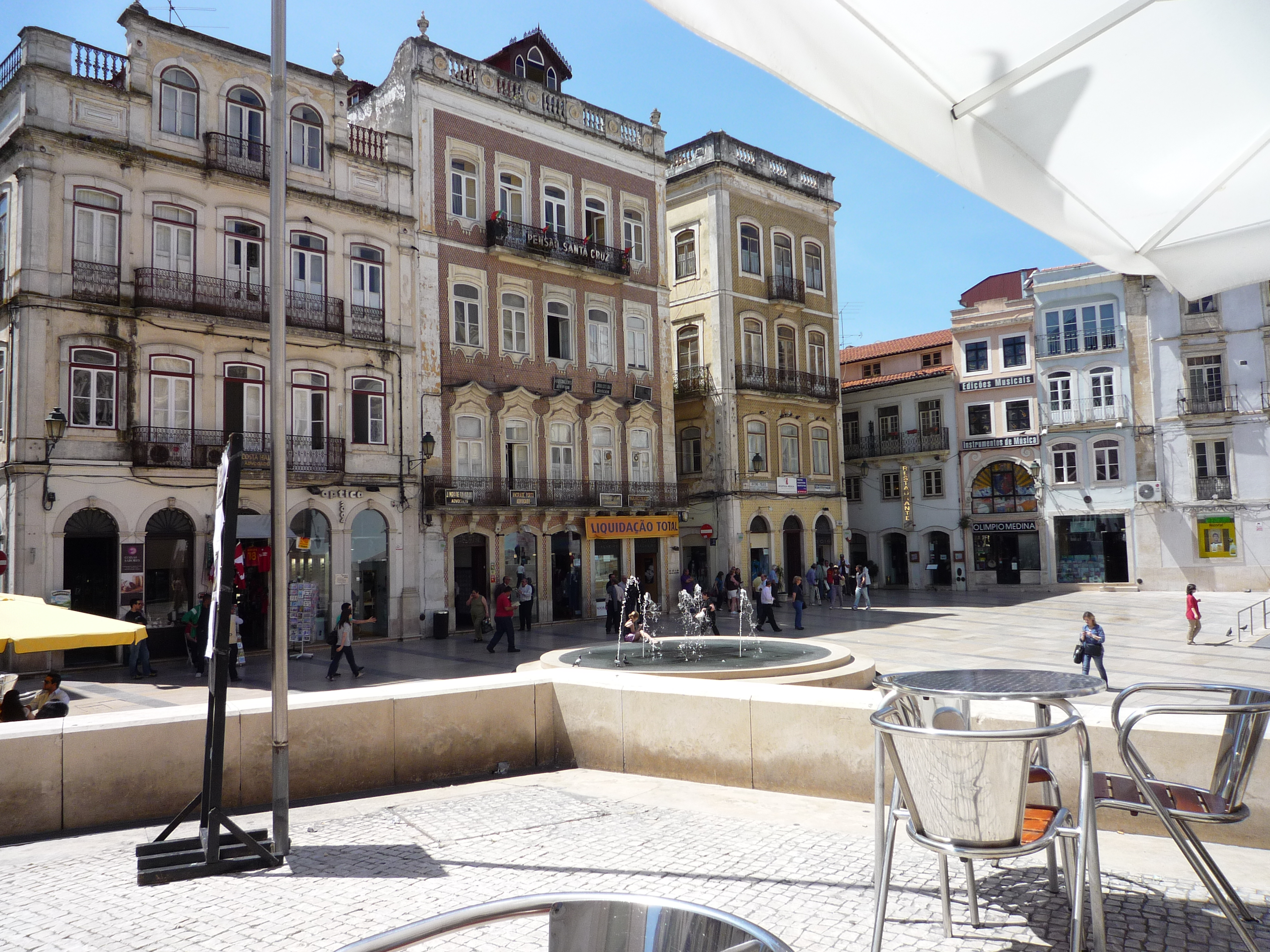
The Praça 8 de Maio, with tourist-friendly cafés, shops and historical monuments

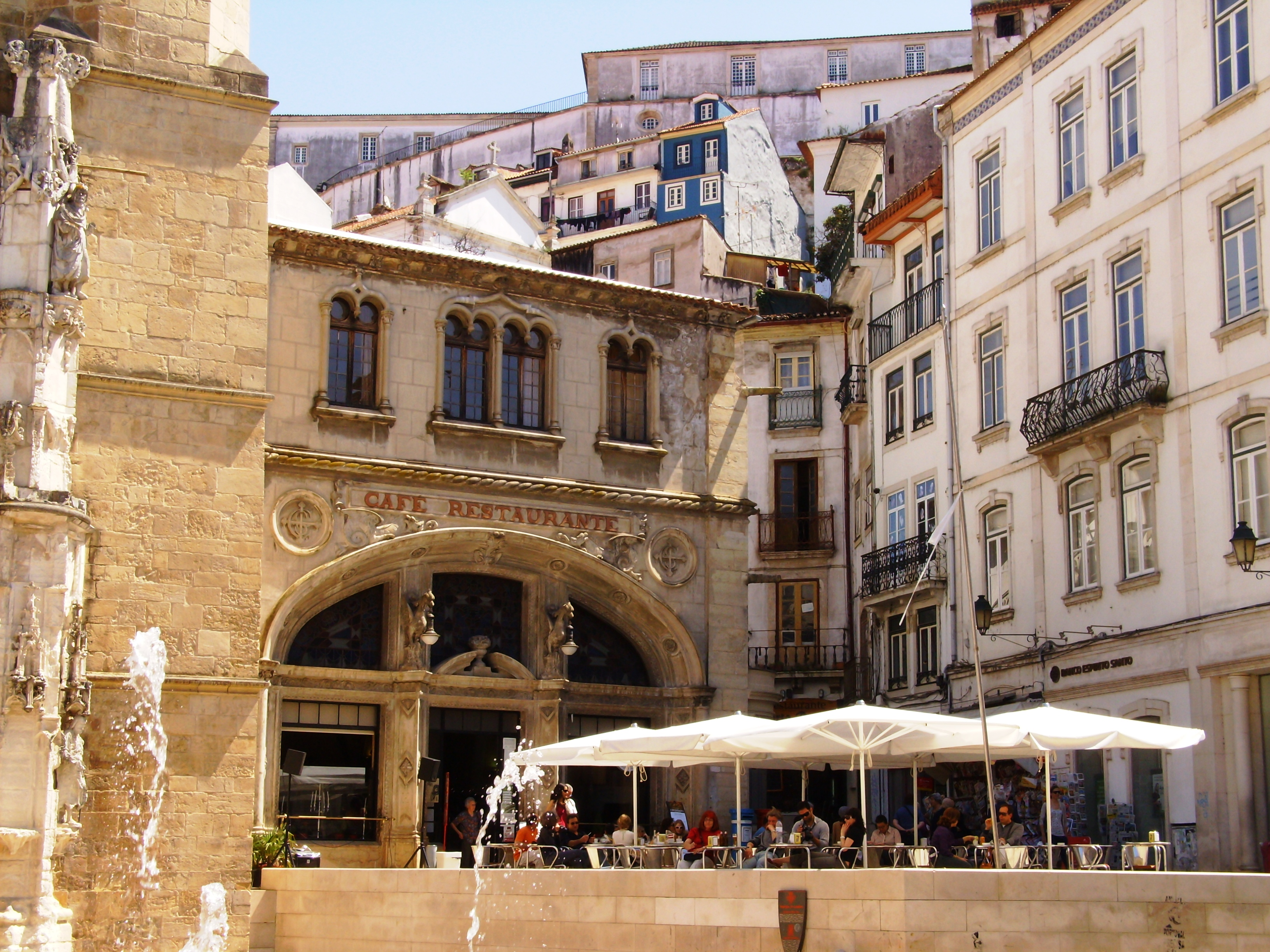
The Café Santa Cruz, in the centre of town, offering an example of the economic activity of the tourist quarter

Located in the municipality of Coimbra, Santa Cruz is part of an integrated rural-urban environment that includes the principal parishes of the city of Coimbra. It is surrounded by the civil parishes of São Bartolomeu, Santa Clara (both to the south), São Martinho do Bispo and Antuzede (in the west), Trouxemil (in the north), Eiras and São Paulo de Frades (in the east) and Santo António dos Olivias and Sé Nova (in the southeast).

The parish is intersected by several rivers, including: the Mondego River (which flows from the Serra da Estrela to Figueira da Foz) through the parish, from Rua dos Oleiros until Choupal; the Ribeira de Coselhas (springing from the Serras do Roxo/Aveleira and exiting at the Rio Velho) and bisects east to west in the zone of Coselhas; the Vale do Norte, crosses the parish south to north around Campos do Bolão passing around Loreto in Pedrulha, before exiting in Adémia; the Ribeira do Vale Meão, which crosses from the Rego do Bonfim joining the Ribeira de Coselhas near Fucoli; and the Vala dos Frades, which parallels the rail-line and Vala do Norte, before joining it near Pedrulha.

The 2001 Census indicated an approximation of the 1920 total population, indicating a decrease in the local population during the 20th century, marked by the transformation of the historic centre of Coimbra's Baixa zone from residential to commercial usage, the ageing of the resident population and the abandonment of the urban infrastructures. In comparison, the daily population fluctuates with 50,000 day visitors, who work in the quarter.

== Economy ==
Although economic activities are essentially commerce- or service-based, an extensive agricultural space (in the area of Campos do Bolão) and industrial zone (in Pedrulha) is established in the parish, which is supported by public transport, infrastructures and socio-cultural institutions.

== Architecture ==
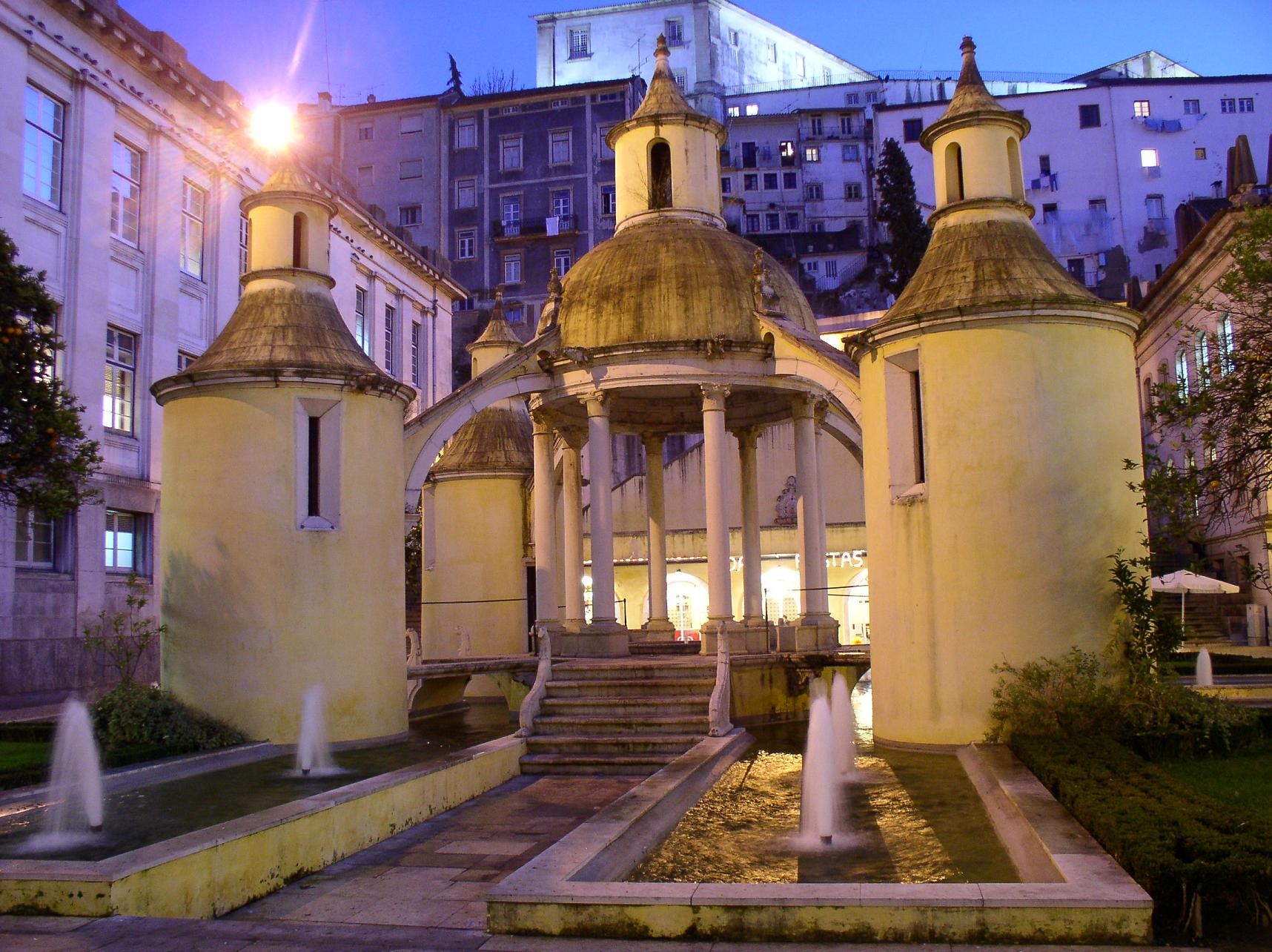
The twilight scene of the cloister in the Jardim da Manga

=== Civic ===
- Arnado Bookstore (Portuguese: Livraria Arnado)
- Building of the CGD Caixa Geral de Depoistos (Portuguese: Edifício da CGD Caixa Geral de Depósitos de Coimbra)
- Building of the CTT Correios, Telégrafos e Telefones (Portuguese: Edifício dos CTT Correios, Telégrafos e Telefones de Coimbra)
- Coimbra City Hall (Portuguese: Câmara Municipal de Coimbra)
- Inquisition Square (Portuguese: Centro de Artes Visuais/Colégio das Artes/Pátio da Inquisição)
- D. Pedro Kiosk/Bar (Portuguese: Quiosque/Bar D. Pedro V)
- D. Pedro V Municipal Market (Portuguese: Mercado D. Pedro V/Mercado Municipal)
- Fountain of Madalena (Portuguese: Fonte da Madalena)
- Fountain of the Jews (Portuguese: Fonte Nova/Fonte dos Judeus)
- Hospital de São Lázaro
- Hotel Tivoli
- Jardim da Manga (Portuguese: Claustro da Manga/Jardim da Manga)
- (Former) Santa Cruz Infirmary/Jaime Cortesão Secondary School (Portuguese: Antiga Enfermaria de Santa Cruz/Escola Secundária Jaime Cortesão)
- (Former) Mirandas Pasta Factory (Portuguese: Antiga Fábrica de Massas dos Mirandas)
- (Former) Barn of Santa Cruz/PSP Quartel (Portuguese: Antigo Celeiro de Santa Cruz/PSP)

=== Religious ===
Altar area at the church of the Santa Cruz Monastery, Igreja de Santa Cruz, Coimbra

- Chapel of Nossa Senhora da Vitória/Corpo de Deus (Portuguese: Capela de Nossa Senhora da Vitória/Capela do Corpo de Deus)
- Church of Carmo (Portuguese: Igreja do Carmo)
- Church of Nossa Senhora da Graça (Portuguese: Igreja da Graça/Igreja de Nossa Senhora da Graça/Colégio da Graça)
- Church of Santa Justa (Portuguese: Igreja de Santa Justa)
- Church of São Domingos (Portuguese: Igreja de São Domingos/Mosteiro de São Domingos)
- College of São Bernardo/Espirito Santo (Portuguese: Colégio de São Bernardo/Colégio do Espírito Santo)
- College of São Pedro dos Religious Terceiros (Portuguese: Colégio de São Pedro dos Religiosos Terceiros)
- Monastery of Santa Cruz (Portuguese: Mosteiro de Santa Cruz), established by Saint Theotonius and the Canons regular of Saint Augustine, around 1131, who supported the early aspirations of Portuguese monarchs;
- Monastery of São João das Donas (Portuguese: Mosteiro de São João das Donas/Café Santa Cruz)
- (Former) College of São Boaventura (Portuguese: Antigo Colégio de São Boaventura/Colégio das Venturas)
- (Former) College of São Tomás (Portuguese: Tribunal da Relação de Coimbra/Palácio da Justiça de Coimbra/Colégio de São Tomás)
