= Coimbra (Sé Nova, Santa Cruz, Almedina e São Bartolomeu) =

- Civil parish
- Location in Portugal
- Coordinates: 40.208°N 8.423°W
- Country: Portugal
- Region: Centro
- Intermunic. comm.: Região de Coimbra
- District: Coimbra
- Municipality: Coimbra

Area
  - Total: 8.33 km^{2} (3.22 sq mi)

Population (2011)
  - Total: 13,971
  - Density: 1,700/km^{2} (4,300/sq mi)
- Time zone: UTC+00:00 (WET)
  - Summer (DST): UTC+01:00 (WEST)

Coimbra (Sé Nova, Santa Cruz, Almedina e São Bartolomeu) is a civil parish in the municipality of Coimbra, Portugal. It was formed in 2013 by the merger of the former parishes Sé Nova, Santa Cruz, Almedina and São Bartolomeu. The population in 2011 was 13,971, in an area of 8.33 km^{2}. It covers the city centre of Coimbra.
