= Olivarius =

Olivarius may refer to:

== People ==
- Ann Olivarius, American-British lawyer
- Dorotheus Olivarius Lavik (1863–1908), Norwegian actor and theatre director
- Kathryn Olivarius, American historian
- Peder Olivarius Bugge (1764–1849), Norwegian bishop
- Johan Olivarius Horn or Johan Horn (1810-1896), Norwegian politician
- Tage Olivarius (1847-1905), Danish architect
- Olivarius Vredus, Latinized pen name of Olivier de Wree (1596-1652), new Latin poet and historian from the Habsburg Netherlands
- Olivarius, alias of Jan Olieschlager (1545-1624), South Netherlandish humanist scholar

== Other ==
- Nucleus olivarius (inf. & sup.)
- Olivarius Hotels, California, United States
- Hercules Olivarius, "Hercules the Olive-Bearer" an epithet of Hercules

== See also ==
- Oliver (given name)
