= Igreja de Santiago (Coimbra) =

Church in Coimbra, Portugal

Coordinates: 40.2094718°N 8.4295292°W

Igreja de Santiago (São Tiago Church) is a church located at Praça do Comércio in São Bartolomeu parish, Coimbra, Portugal. Built between the late 12th and early 13th centuries, it is one of the great Romanesque monuments of the city, and is classified as a National Monument.

First construction began before 957, as evidenced by a document donated to Lorraine Monastery. It was rebuilt in the last decades of the twelfth century in the reign of Sancho I of Portugal. The elegant south portal probably dates to the late 12th century, and consists of several unpainted archivolts, surrounded by a vine-shaped frame, and capitals and columns with plant motifs. The four-arch portal in the front facade was built later. It capitals contain various motifs, both plant and animal, some derived from the Old Cathedral of Coimbra, and its columns are decorated with spiral-shaped geometric reliefs and plant motifs. The church interior has three naves and three chapels at its head. In the 15th century, a quadrangular chapel was added to the north side of the church, with a Gothic-style portal and a decorated chambranle.

Although it has undergone several modifications over the centuries, the most radical intervention took place in the 1540s, when a second church was built over the early church to serve as the city's Mercy Church. This addition was removed in the restoration work of the first half of the twentieth century. An important mutilation of the church occurred in 1861, when the current Visconde da Luz street was widened. In this work, much of the southern apsidiole and main chapel were lost.
