= Associação Desportiva de Vagos =

Portuguese women's basketball club

AD Vagos
- Leagues: Liga Feminina
- Founded: 1994
- Arena: Pavilhao Municipal
- Location: Vagos, Portugal
- Team colors: Yellow
- President: Mario Rocha
- Head coach: João Janeiro
- Championships: 1 national League; 4 national Cups
Home	Away	Third

Associaçao Desportiva de Vagos is a Portuguese women's basketball club from Vagos founded in 1994. It has won the 2010 national championship plus four national cups, and it has been a regular in the FIBA Eurocup since 2009.

== 2011-12 Roster ==
- (1.87) (Brazil) Flávia dos Santos
- (1.86) (Brazil) Lilian Gonçalves
- (1.85) (Portugal) Joana Lopes
- (1.85) (Portugal) Ana Teixeira
- (1.82) (Angola) Artemis Afonso
- (1.79) (Portugal) Ines Pinto
- (1.76) (Portugal) Daniela Domingues
- (1.73) (Portugal) Joana Jesus
- (1.70) (Portugal) Ines Faustino
- (1.67) (Portugal) Sara da Resurreiçao
- (1.65) (Portugal) Mariana Alves
- (1.65) (Portugal) Maria Pereira
- (1.62) (Portugal) Carolina Anacleto

== Titles ==
- Portuguese League
  - 2010
- Portuguese Cup
  - 2009, 2012
