= Almedina (Coimbra) =

- Civil parish
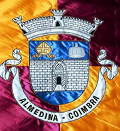
- Coat of arms

- Location in Portugal
- Coordinates: 40.2008°N 8.4228°W
- Country: Portugal
- Region: Centro
- Intermunic. comm.: Região de Coimbra
- District: Coimbra
- Municipality: Coimbra
- Disbanded: 2013
- Time zone: UTC+00:00 (WET)
  - Summer (DST): UTC+01:00 (WEST)

Almedina is a former civil parish in the municipality of Coimbra, Portugal. In 2013, the parish merged into the new parish Coimbra (Sé Nova, Santa Cruz, Almedina e São Bartolomeu). In 2011, its population was over 900 inhabitants, in an area west of University Hill in Coimbra, covering 1.01 km²
