= Olivais F.C. =

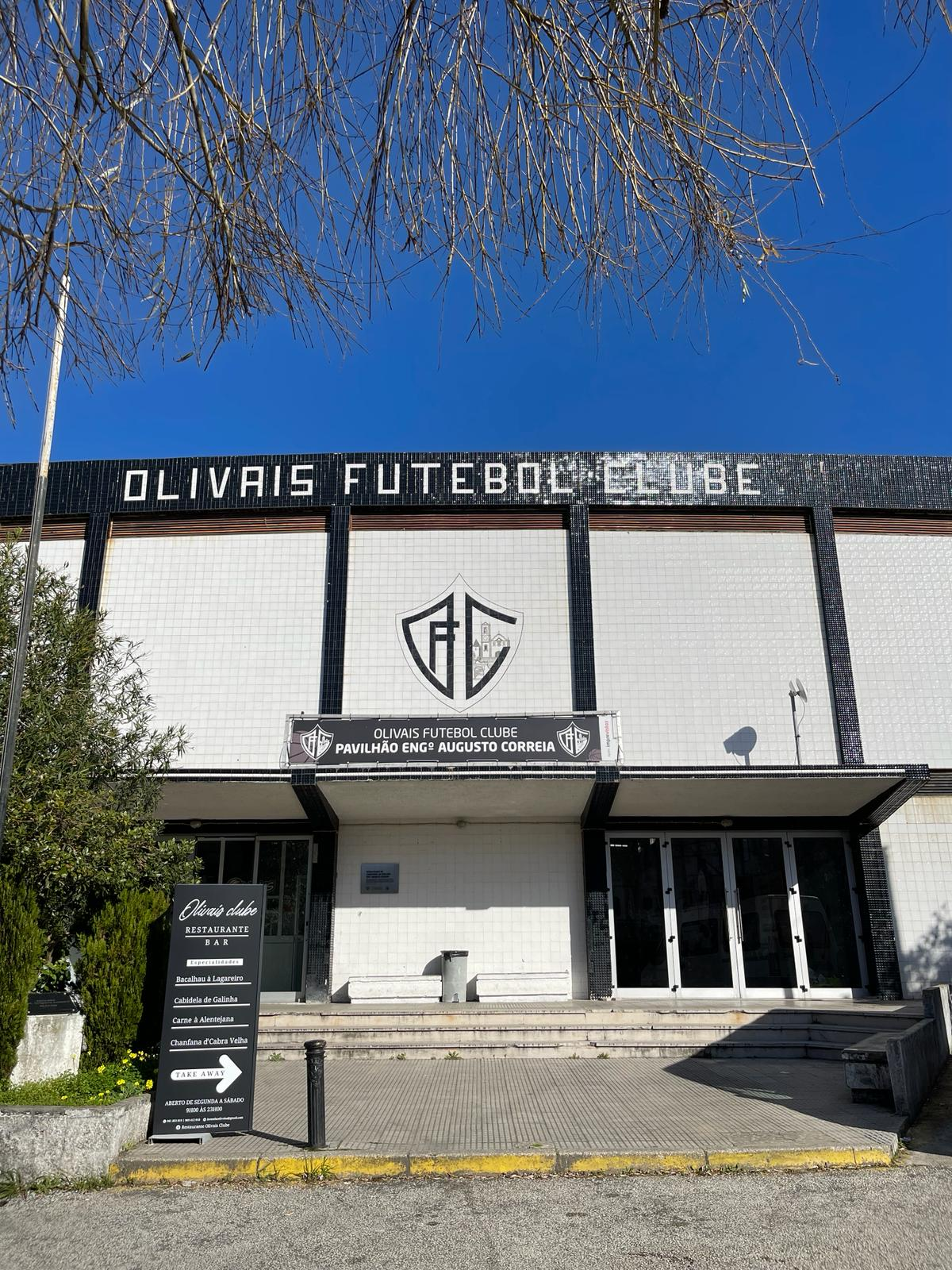
Outside view of Olivais F.C. sports pavilion.

Olivais Futebol Clube is a Portuguese sports club founded in 1935 in the freguesia (civil parish or borough) of Santo António dos Olivais, Coimbra. Its women's basketball team has won several accolades and trophies in Portugal, including both the women's national championship and the Portuguese Cup. Other sports departments and sporting disciplines of Olivais F.C. are aikido, athletics and boxing.
