= Portuguese Women's Basketball Cup =

Women's top basketball cup in Portugal

The Portuguese Women's Basketball Cup (Taça de Portugal de Basquetebol Feminino) is the women's top basketball cup in Portugal. It is organized by the Portuguese Basketball Federation and started in 1963–64 as Taça Regina Peyroteo. Four editions later, in 1967–68, it was renamed Taça de Portugal (Portuguese Cup).

== Portuguese Cup winners ==
Season	Final
Season	Winners	Result	Runners-up
1963–64	CDUP	26–16	Benfica
1964–65	CDUP	33–06	CDUL
1965–66	CDUP	24–17	CIF
1966–67	CDUP	26–22	CIF
1967–68	Académica de Coimbra	41–37	CIF
1968–69	Académica de Coimbra	51–35	CUF
1969–70	Académica de Coimbra	69–48	Gaia
1979–71	Académica de Coimbra	50–42	CIF
1971–72	Académico FC	66–59	Académica de Coimbra
1972–73	Académico FC	80–22	Sport Algés e Dafundo
1973–74	Académico FC	45–39	Académica de Coimbra
1974–75	Académico FC	55–41	CIF
1975–76	CIF	80–15	Benfica
1976–77	CIF	55–46	Académico FC
1977–78	CIF	51–35	Lx Oriental
1978–79	CIF	57–44	Olivais FC
1979–80	CIF	75–49	Académico FC
1980–81	Académico FC	54–47	Sport Algés e Dafundo
1981–82	Sport Algés e Dafundo	82–46	Olivais FC
1982–83	Sport Algés e Dafundo	69–58	Académico FC
1983–84	CIF	72–57	Clube Independente
1984–85	Sport Algés e Dafundo	94–55	Académico FC
1985–86	Sport Algés e Dafundo	71–64	CIF
1986–87	Sport Algés e Dafundo	88–48	Académico FC
1987–88	CIF	88–46	Sport Algés e Dafundo
1988–89	CD Estrelas da Avenida	55–46	CDUL
1989–90	CD Estrelas da Avenida	79–55	CIBF
1990–91	CD Estrelas da Avenida	67–54	Estrela da Amadora
1991–92	CD Estrelas da Avenida	60–55	Académico FC
1992–93	União Desportivo de Santarém	57–55	CD Estrelas da Avenida
1993–94	União Desportivo de Santarém	88–61	CAB Madeira
1994–95	CD Estrelas da Avenida	66–55	Olivais FC
1995–96	CAB Madeira	70–63	Anadia FC
1996–97	União Desportivo de Santarém	88–86	Anadia FC
1997–98	União Desportivo de Santarém	72–62	Olivais FC
1998–99	CAB Madeira	76–66	Nacional da Madeira
1999–2000	CAB Madeira	60–46	Nacional da Madeira
2000–01	Santarém Basket	76–53	Olivais FC
2001–02	Santarém Basket	69–63	CAB Madeira
2002–03	Santarém Basket	69–56	Olivais FC
2003–04	Escola Sec. de Santo André	65–59	Olivais FC
2004–05	Escola Sec. de Santo André	71–59	CAB Madeira
2005–06	CAB Madeira	90–73	Boa Viagem
2006–07	CAB Madeira	80–68	Boa Viagem
2007–08	AD Vagos	62–53	Sport Algés e Dafundo
2008–09	Olivais FC	73–63	AD Vagos
2009–10	Olivais FC	67–58	Boa Viagem
2010–11	Quinta dos Lombos	78–56	MCELL-Alges
2011–12	AD Vagos	55–49	Sport Algés e Dafundo
2012–13	Sport Algés e Dafundo	80–72	CAB Madeira
2013–14	CAB Madeira	73–66	AD Vagos
2014–15	CAB Madeira	61–56	Quinta dos Lombos
2015–16	Clube União Sportiva	74–51	Olivais FC
2017–18	AD Vagos	54–50	Clube União Sportiva
2018–19	Olivais FC	49–40	Vitória de Guimarães
2019–20	Quinta dos Lombos	68–56	Clube União Sportiva
2020–21	Benfica	85–63	Vitória de Guimarães
2021–22	Benfica	82–78	Escola Sec. de Santo André

== Cup winners ==
Team	Won	Years won
Clube Internacional de Foot-Ball	7	1975–76, 1976–77, 1977–78, 1978–79, 1979–80, 1983–84, 1987–88
CAB Madeira	7	1995–96, 1998–99, 1999–2000, 2005–06, 2006–07, 2013–14, 2014–15
Sport Algés e Dafundo	6	1981–82, 1982–83, 1984–85, 1985–86, 1986–87, 2012–13
Académico FC	5	1971–72, 1972–73, 1973–74, 1974–75, 1980–81
CD Estrelas da Avenida	5	1988–89, 1989–90, 1990–91, 1991–92, 1994–95
CD Universitario do Porto (CDUP)	4	1963–64, 1964–65, 1965–66, 1966–67
Associação Académica de Coimbra	4	1967–68, 1968–69, 1969–70, 1970–71
União Desportivo de Santarém	4	1992–93, 1993–94, 1996–97, 1997–98
Santarém Basket	3	2000–01, 2001–02, 2002–03
Associação Desportiva Vagos	3	2007–08, 2011–12, 2017–18
Olivais Futebol Clube	3	2008–09, 2009–10, 2018–19
Benfica	3	2020–21, 2021–22, 2023–24
GD Escola Sec. de Santo André ("GDESSA")	2	2003–04, 2004–05
Clube Recreativo Quinta dos Lombos	2	2010–11, 2019–20
Clube União Sportiva	1	2015–16
