= Liga Feminina de Basquetebol =

- Current season, competition or edition: 2024–25 Liga Feminina de Basquetebol
- Sport: Basketball
- Founded: 1955
- Continent: Europe

The Liga Feminina de Basquetebol (LFB) is the premier women's basketball league in Portugal. Founded in 1955, it has been carried out every year since 1959. Currently the LFB is granted two spots in the FIBA Eurocup.

== 2024–25 Teams ==
Team	Home city	Arena
AD Vagos	Vagos	Pavilhão Municipal de Vagos
Barcelos	Barcelos	Escola Secundaria de Barcelos
CAB Madeira	Funchal	Pavilhão Do Clube Amigos do Basquete
Esgueira	Esgueira	Pavilhão Clube do Povo de Esgueira
Galitos	Barreiro	Pavilhão do Clube dos Galitos
Gdessa Barreiro	Barreiro	Pavilhão Municipal Luis de Carvalho
Imortal	Albufeira	Pavilhão Desportivo de Albufeira
Natação	Ermesinde	Pavilhão Municipal de Ermesinde
Quinta dos Lombos	Carcavelos	Pavilhao Desportivo dos Lombos
Sanjoanense	São João da Madeira	Pavilhão Municipal Paulo Pinto
SL Benfica	Lisbon	Pavilhão Fidelidade
União Sportiva	Ponta Delgada	Pavilhão Sidonio Serpa

== List of champions ==
- 1955 Os Belenenses (1)
- 1959 Academica Coimbra (1)
- 1960 Academica Coimbra (2)
- 1961 Benfica de Lubango (1)
- 1962 Benfica de Lubango (2)
- 1963 Benfica de Lubango (3)
- 1964 Academica Coimbra (3)
- 1965 Benfica de Lubango (4)
- 1966 Benfica de Lubango (5)
- 1967 CDUP (1)
- 1968 Academica Coimbra (4)
- 1969 Academica Coimbra (5)
- 1970 Academica Coimbra (6)
- 1971 CIF Lisboa (1)
- 1972 Academica Coimbra (7)
- 1973 Academica Coimbra (8)
- 1974 Academica Coimbra (9)
- 1975 Académico Porto (1)
- 1976 Academica Coimbra (10)
- 1977 CIF Lisboa (2)
- 1978 Académico Porto (2)
- 1979 CIF Lisboa (3)
- 1980 CIF Lisboa (4)
- 1981 CIF Lisboa (5)
- 1982 CIF Lisboa (6)
- 1983 Algés (1)
- 1984 CIF Lisboa (7)
- 1985 Algés (2)
- 1986 Algés (3)
- 1987 CIF Lisboa (8)
- 1988 Algés (4)
- 1989 Estrelas Avenida (1)
- 1990 Estrelas Avenida (2)
- 1991 CIF Lisboa (9)
- 1992 Estrelas Avenida (3)
- 1993 União Santarém (1)
- 1994 Estrelas Avenida (4)
- 1995 Estrelas Avenida (5)
- 1996 União Santarém (2)
- 1997 CAB Madeira (1)
- 1998 Olivais (1)
- 1999 CAB Madeira (2)
- 2000 Póvoa (1)
- 2001 CAB Madeira (3)
- 2002 União Santarém (3)
- 2003 CAB Madeira (4)
- 2004 União Santarém (4)
- 2005 CAB Madeira (5)
- 2006 CAB Madeira (6)
- 2007 GDESSA (1)
- 2008 Olivais (3)
- 2009 Olivais (4)
- 2010 Vagos (1)
- 2011 Quinta dos Lombos (1)
- 2012 Algés (5)
- 2013 Algés (6)
- 2014 Quinta dos Lombos (2)
- 2015 União Sportiva (1)
- 2016 União Sportiva (2)
- 2017 GDESSA (2)
- 2018 União Sportiva (3)
- 2019 Olivais (5)
- 2020 Cancelled due to the COVID-19 pandemic
- 2021 SL Benfica (1)
- 2022 SL Benfica (2)
- 2023 GDESSA (3)
- 2024 SL Benfica (3)
