= Sé Nova (Coimbra) =

Coordinates: 40.210°N 8.417°W

Sé Nova is a former civil parish in the municipality of Coimbra, Portugal. In 2013, it merged into the new parish Coimbra (Sé Nova, Santa Cruz, Almedina e São Bartolomeu). Notable landmarks included the New Cathedral of Coimbra and Botanical Garden of the University of Coimbra.
