= 2013 FIBA Europe Under-20 Championship Division B =

European basketball tournament

9th Division B Championship

Tournament details
- Host country: Romania
- Dates: 12–21 July 2013
- Teams: 12 (from 1 confederation)
- Venue(s): 2 (in 1 host city)

Official website
- www.fibaeurope.com

The 2013 FIBA Europe Under-20 Championship Division B was the ninth edition of the Division B of the FIBA Europe Under-20 Championship, the second-tier of European U-20 basketball. As in 2008, the tournament was held in Romania. Pitești was the host city.

== Venues ==
Location	View	City	Arena	Capacity
2013 FIBA Europe Under-20 Championship Division B is located in Romania		Pitești	Sala Sporturilor "Trivale"	2,000
2013 FIBA Europe Under-20 Championship Division B is located in Romania		Pitești	University Sport Hall	600

== Teams ==
- Belgium
- Cyprus
- Finland
- Great Britain
- Hungary
- Luxembourg
- Netherlands
- Poland
- Portugal
- Romania
- Slovakia
- Switzerland

== First round ==
Twelve teams were allocated in two groups or six teams each. The top four teams advanced to the Quarterfinals, whereas the last two teams played for the 9th–12th place in the Classification Games.

Team advanced to Quarterfinals
Team will compete in Classification Games for 9th – 12th place

=== Group A ===
Team	Pld	W	L	PF	PA	PD	Pts
Great Britain	5	5	0	428	331	+97	10
Poland	5	4	1	419	296	+123	9
Hungary	5	3	2	341	322	+19	8
Romania	5	2	3	308	387	−79	7
Luxembourg	5	1	4	318	397	−79	6
Slovakia	5	0	5	302	383	−81	5

12 July 2013
14:00

Report

Slovakia	62–75	Great Britain
Scoring by quarter: 18–26, 14–16, 15–13, 15–20
Pts: Juricek 17; Rebs: Juricek 8 Asts: Tot 7		Pts: Van Oostrum 29; Rebs: Van Oostrum 10; Asts: Van Oostrum 5

Sala Sporturilor "Trivale", Pitești
Attendance: 50
Referees: Amit Balak (ISR), Tomislav Hordov (CRO), Anthonie Sinterniklaas (NED)

12 July 2013
16:10

Report

Luxembourg	61–84	Hungary
Scoring by quarter: 12–23, 10–15, 15–25, 24–21
Pts: Melcher 23; Rebs: Melcher, Laurent 7 Asts: Welter 3		Pts: Polyák 17; Rebs: Dobos 12; Asts: three players 2

Sala Sporturilor "Trivale", Pitești
Attendance: 100
Referees: Roman Ponomarenko (UKR), Nick Van den Broeck (BEL), Markos Michaelides (SUI)

12 July 2013
19:30

Report

Poland	92–62	Romania
Scoring by quarter: 16–16, 26–14, 23–18, 27–14
Pts: Ponitka 18; Rebs: Gielo 5 Asts: four players 3		Pts: Olah 17; Rebs: Filip 7 Asts: three players 2

Sala Sporturilor "Trivale", Pitești
Attendance: 200
Referees: Dragan Kralj (BIH), Fernando Rocha (POR), Charalampos Santos (CYP)

13 July 2013
15:00

Report

Great Britain	106–92	Luxembourg
Scoring by quarter: 33–18, 15–32, 32–23, 26–19
Pts: Lewis 23; Rebs: Thomas-Edwards 15; Asts: Van Oostrum 11		Pts: Laurent 29; Rebs: Laurent 11; Asts: Polfer 5

Sala Sporturilor "Trivale", Pitești
Attendance: 100
Referees: Fernando Rocha (POR), Nick Van den Broeck (BEL), Anthonie Sinterniklaas (NED)

13 July 2013
17:15

Report

Hungary	53–80	Poland
Scoring by quarter: 17–19, 15–24, 7–20, 14–17
Pts: Allen 11; Rebs: Dobos 6 Asts: Pongó 2		Pts: Ponitka 18; Rebs: Karnowski 12; Asts: Michalak, Grochowski 3

Sala Sporturilor "Trivale", Pitești
Attendance: 100
Referees: Markos Michaelides (SUI), Amit Balak (ISR), Carlos Peruga (ESP)

13 July 2013
19:30

Report

Romania	78–62	Slovakia
Scoring by quarter: 25–15, 22–13, 17–23, 14–11
Pts: Olah 21; Rebs: Filip 11; Asts: Olah 6		Pts: Čekovský 13; Rebs: Juricek, Cekovský 8 Asts: Tot 5

Sala Sporturilor "Trivale", Pitești
Attendance: 200
Referees: Roman Ponomarenko (UKR), Tomislav Hordov (CRO), Charalampos Santos (CYP)

14 July 2013
15:00

Report

Poland	84–34	Luxembourg
Scoring by quarter: 26–13, 19–10, 24–6, 15–5
Pts: Karnowski 18; Rebs: Karnowski 11; Asts: Grochowski, Matczak 4		Pts: Laurent 10; Rebs: Laurent 9 Asts: Ittenbach 2

Sala Sporturilor "Trivale", Pitești
Attendance: 100
Referees: Walid Marcel Abirached (LIB), Charalampos Santos (CYP), Milosav Kaluđerović (MNE)

14 July 2013
17:15

Report

Slovakia	63–79	Hungary
Scoring by quarter: 17–23, 16–18, 16–23, 14–15
Pts: Juricek 22; Rebs: Čekovský 7 Asts: Tot 5		Pts: Allen 15; Rebs: Allen 9 Asts: Pongó 3

Sala Sporturilor "Trivale", Pitești
Attendance: 100
Referees: Fernando Rocha (POR), Aleksandar Milojević (MKD), Wojciech Liszka (POL)

14 July 2013
19:30

Report

Romania	43–99	Great Britain
Scoring by quarter: 10–22, 7–31, 14–21, 12–25
Pts: Olah 9 Rebs: Lazar 6 Asts: Damian 2		Pts: Van Oostrum 19; Rebs: Thomas-Edwards 14; Asts: Stewart 3

Sala Sporturilor "Trivale", Pitești
Attendance: 300
Referees: Tomislav Hordov (CRO), Carlos Peruga (ESP), Roman Ponomarenko (UKR)

16 July 2013
15:00

Report

Luxembourg	62–51	Slovakia
Scoring by quarter: 18–20, 8–12, 15–9, 21–10
Pts: Laurent 20; Rebs: Melcher, Laurent 8 Asts: Melcher 5		Pts: Čekovský 12; Rebs: Čekovský 11; Asts: Tot 7

Sala Sporturilor "Trivale", Pitești
Attendance: 100
Referees: Roman Ponomarenko (UKR), Robert Hickman (ENG), Walid Marcel Abirached (LIB)

16 July 2013
17:15

Report

Great Britain	83–74	Poland
Scoring by quarter: 24–27, 27–15, 7–14, 25–18
Pts: Van Oostrum 37; Rebs: Van Oostrum, Lewis 9 Asts: Van Oostrum 3		Pts: Ponitka 23; Rebs: Karnowski 13; Asts: Kowalczyk 4

Sala Sporturilor "Trivale", Pitești
Attendance: 200
Referees: Fernando Rocha (POR), Dragan Kralj (BIH), Charalampos Santos (CYP)

16 July 2013
19:30

Report

Hungary	65–53	Romania
Scoring by quarter: 15–21, 19–11, 13–10, 18–11
Pts: Allen 15; Rebs: Allen 16; Asts: Kovács, Markovic 3		Pts: Olah 17; Rebs: Stoicoviciu 10; Asts: Cristiean 4

Sala Sporturilor "Trivale", Pitești
Attendance: 350
Referees: Milan Brziak (SVK), Markos Michaelides (SUI), Amit Balak (ISR)

17 July 2013
15:00

Report

Slovakia	64–89	Poland
Scoring by quarter: 16–21, 14–31, 13–21, 21–16
Pts: Brodziansky 17; Rebs: Čekovský 11; Asts: Novysedlák 4		Pts: Michalak 19; Rebs: Karnowski 13; Asts: Grochowski 8

Sala Sporturilor "Trivale", Pitești
Attendance: 50
Referees: Charalampos Santos (CYP), Anthonie Sinterniklaas (NED), Nick Van den Broeck (BEL)

17 July 2013
17:15

Report

Hungary	60–65	Great Britain
Scoring by quarter: 20–13, 8–22, 16–21, 16–9
Pts: Marković 15; Rebs: Dobos 10; Asts: Allen 3		Pts: Van Oostrum 26; Rebs: Don 10; Asts: Van Oostrum 5

Sala Sporturilor "Trivale", Pitești
Attendance: 70
Referees: Tomislav Hordov (CRO), Florin Grigoras (ROU), Milosav Kaluđerović (MNE)

17 July 2013
19:30

Report

Romania	72–69	Luxembourg
Scoring by quarter: 9–16, 27–16, 21–26, 15–11
Pts: Movileanu 21; Rebs: Olah 22; Asts: Cristiean 4		Pts: Laurent 30; Rebs: Laurent 7 Asts: Welter 4

Sala Sporturilor "Trivale", Pitești
Attendance: 200
Referees: Fernando Rocha (POR), Carlos Peruga (ESP), Gellert Kapitany (HUN)

=== Group B ===
Team	Pld	W	L	PF	PA	PD	Pts
Belgium	5	5	0	350	314	+36	10
Switzerland	5	3	2	382	361	+21	8
Portugal	5	3	2	378	364	+14	8
Netherlands	5	2	3	332	316	+16	7
Finland	5	1	4	342	373	−31	6
Cyprus	5	1	4	290	346	−56	6

12 July 2013
13:45

Report

Belgium	72–67	Switzerland
Scoring by quarter: 15–20, 19–20, 18–17, 20–10
Pts: Lecomte 26; Rebs: Mollekens 13; Asts: Lecomte 5		Pts: three players 15; Rebs: Andjelkovic 11; Asts: Kostić 5

University Sport Hall, Pitești
Attendance: 50
Referees: Carlos Peruga (ESP), Robert Hickman (ENG), Gellért Kapitány (HUN)

12 July 2013
16:00

Report

Cyprus	58–66	Netherlands
Scoring by quarter: 20–14, 20–16, 10–21, 8–15
Pts: three players 15; Rebs: Mantovani 9 Asts: Iliadis, Eleftheriou 5		Pts: Schaftenaar 17; Rebs: Bleeker 12; Asts: Bouwknecht 3

University Sport Hall, Pitești
Attendance: 50
Referees: Aleksandar Milojević (MKD), Milosav Kaluđerović (MNE), Wojciech Liszka (POL)

12 July 2013
19:30

Report

Finland	71–93	Portugal
Scoring by quarter: 11–18, 12–25, 21–31, 27–19
Pts: Cavén 23; Rebs: Huolila 9 Asts: five players 1		Pts: Cardoso 14; Rebs: Castela 6 Asts: Cardoso 3

University Sport Hall, Pitești
Attendance: 50
Referees: Milan Brziak (SVK), Walid Marcel Abirached (LIB), Florin Grigoras (ROU)

13 July 2013
15:00

Report

Switzerland	57–66	Cyprus
Scoring by quarter: 12–22, 15–17, 14–11, 16–16
Pts: Basic 15; Rebs: Affolter 10; Asts: Hoxha, Hauri 3		Pts: Iliadis 24; Rebs: three players 11; Asts: Eleftheriou 5

University Sport Hall, Pitești
Attendance: 50
Referees: Florin Grigoras (ROU), Milosav Kaluđerović (MNE), Walid Marcel Abirached (LIB)

13 July 2013
17:15

Report

Netherlands	79–40	Finland
Scoring by quarter: 18–9, 18–15, 23–10, 20–6
Pts: Tönjann 18; Rebs: Bleeker 8 Asts: Vos 4		Pts: Palmi 17; Rebs: Palmi 12; Asts: Lehtoranta 1

University Sport Hall, Pitești
Attendance: 50
Referees: Milan Brziak (SVK), Gellért Kapitány (HUN), Aleksandar Milojević (MKD)

13 July 2013
19:30

Report

Portugal	68–70	Belgium
Scoring by quarter: 23–15, 17–18, 9–13, 19–24
Pts: Castela 16; Rebs: Grosso 8 Asts: Cardoso 4		Pts: Lecomte 28; Rebs: François 15; Asts: Lecomte 9

University Sport Hall, Pitești
Attendance: 100
Referees: Dragan Kralj (BIH), Robert Hickman (ENG), Wojciech Liszka (POL)

14 July 2013
15:00

Report

Finland	82–37	Cyprus
Scoring by quarter: 17–9, 20–7, 18–13, 27–8
Pts: Cavén 16; Rebs: Rajala 14; Asts: Lehtoranta 5		Pts: Georgiou 8 Rebs: Mantovani 10; Asts: Eleftheriou 2

University Sport Hall, Pitești
Attendance: 50
Referees: Markos Michaelides (SUI), Amit Balak (ISR), Nick Van den Broeck (BEL)

14 July 2013
17:15

Report

Portugal	70–90	Switzerland
Scoring by quarter: 20–14, 14–20, 26–24, 10–32
Pts: Cardoso, Ribeiro 13; Rebs: Correia de Sá, Ribeiro 7 Asts: Grosso 3		Pts: Hoxha 19; Rebs: Affolter, Andjelkovic 9 Asts: Lehmann 6

University Sport Hall, Pitești
Attendance: 50
Referees: Gellért Kapitány (HUN), Robert Hickman (ENG), Anthonie Sinterniklaas (NED)

14 July 2013
19:30

Report

Belgium	72–59	Netherlands
Scoring by quarter: 17–17, 22–11, 14–13, 19–18
Pts: Lecomte 21; Rebs: Schoepen 7 Asts: Lecomte 9		Pts: Schaftenaar 20; Rebs: Bleeker 10; Asts: Hope 3

University Sport Hall, Pitești
Attendance: 50
Referees: Florin Grigoras (ROU), Milan Brziak (SVK), Dragan Kralj (BIH)

16 July 2013
15:00

Report

Netherlands	63–72	Portugal
Scoring by quarter: 19–23, 14–26, 13–11, 17–12
Pts: Hope, Van Der Ark 13; Rebs: Schaftenaar 8 Asts: three players 2		Pts: Bastos 15; Rebs: Cabanas 6 Asts: Ventura 3

University Sport Hall, Pitești
Attendance: 50
Referees: Carlos Peruga (ESP), Tomislav Hordov (CRO), Milosav Kaluđerović (MNE)

16 July 2013
17:15

Report

Cyprus	59–66	Belgium
Scoring by quarter: 11–17, 7–22, 20–7, 21–20
Pts: Iliadis 20; Rebs: Mantovani, Eleftheriou 7 Asts: Eleftheriou 4		Pts: Hazard 15; Rebs: three players 10; Asts: Lecomte, Hazard 3

University Sport Hall, Pitești
Attendance: 50
Referees: Wojciech Liszka (POL), Gellert Kapitany (HUN), Anthonie Sinterniklaas (NED)

16 July 2013
19:30

Report

Switzerland	94–88 (OT)	Finland
Scoring by quarter: 17–20, 23–27, 24–19, 16–14, Overtime: 14–8
Pts: Mladjan 26; Rebs: Andjelkovic 14; Asts: Hoxha 5		Pts: Cavén 34; Rebs: Rajala 16; Asts: Huolila, Herrala 3

University Sport Hall, Pitești
Attendance: 50
Referees: Florin Grigoras (ROU), Aleksandar Milojević (MKD), Nick Van den Broeck (BEL)

17 July 2013
15:00

Report

Portugal	75–70	Cyprus
Scoring by quarter: 18–18, 23–21, 12–15, 22–16
Pts: Bastos 17; Rebs: Correia de Sá 7 Asts: Cardoso 4		Pts: Iliadis 31; Rebs: Mantovani 14; Asts: Iliadis 5

University Sport Hall, Pitești
Attendance: 100
Referees: Milan Brziak (SVK), Roman Ponomarenko (UKR), Aleksandar Milojević (MKD)

17 July 2013
17:15

Report

Belgium	70–61	Finland
Scoring by quarter: 16–14, 16–18, 21–12, 17–17
Pts: Vlamynck 14; Rebs: François 7 Asts: Lecomte 10		Pts: Cavén 23; Rebs: Rajala 7 Asts: Herrala 3

University Sport Hall, Pitești
Attendance: 70
Referees: Dragan Kralj (BIH), Markos Michaelides (SUI), Walid Marcel Abirached (LIB)

17 July 2013
19:30

Report

Netherlands	65–74	Switzerland
Scoring by quarter: 12–13, 19–20, 15–29, 19–12
Pts: Van Der Ark 16; Rebs: Schaftenaar 12; Asts: Hope 4		Pts: Mladjan 23; Rebs: Mlađan 8 Asts: Kostić 4

University Sport Hall, Pitești
Attendance: 100
Referees: Amit Balak (ISR), Wojciech Liszka (POL), Robert Hickman (ENG)

== Classification Games for 9th – 12th place ==
The last two teams of each group competed in a round robin for the 9th–12th place.

=== Group C ===
Team	Pld	W	L	PF	PA	PD	Pts
Slovakia	3	3	0	228	190	+38	6
Finland	3	2	1	245	184	+61	5
Cyprus	3	1	2	177	214	−37	4
Luxembourg	3	0	3	182	244	−62	3

19 July 2013
17:15

Report

Luxembourg	63–64	Cyprus
Scoring by quarter: 17–17, 8–20, 24–9, 14–18
Pts: Melcher 23; Rebs: Laurent 10; Asts: Melcher 5		Pts: Mantovani 21; Rebs: Mantovani 16; Asts: Iliadis, Eleftheriou 3

University Sport Hall, Pitești
Attendance: 50
Referees: Anthonie Sinterniklaas (NED), Roman Ponomarenko (UKR), Walid Marcel Abirached (LIB)

19 July 2013
19:30

Report

Slovakia	75–67	Finland
Scoring by quarter: 21–12, 16–16, 17–21, 21–18
Pts: Brodziansky 21; Rebs: Čekovský 11; Asts: Novysedlák, Tot 7		Pts: Cavén, Palmi 16; Rebs: Palmi, Rajala 9 Asts: Herrala 2

University Sport Hall, Pitești
Attendance: 50
Referees: Alesandar Milojević (MKD), Milosav Kaluđerović (MNE), Nick Van den Broeck (BEL)

20 July 2013
17:15

Report

Finland	112–52	Luxembourg
Scoring by quarter: 26–11, 25–16, 25–14, 36–11
Pts: Palmi 60; Rebs: Rajala 12; Asts: Herrala 7		Pts: Melcher 19; Rebs: Melcher, Gengler 3 Asts: Goergen, Welter 2

University Sport Hall, Pitești
Attendance: 50
Referees: Robert Hickman (ENG), Anthonie Sinterniklaas (NED), Nick Van den Broeck (BEL)

20 July 2013
19:30

Report

Cyprus	56–85	Slovakia
Scoring by quarter: 6–25, 11–22, 17–18', 22–20
Pts: Eleftheriou 20; Rebs: Mantovani 8 Asts: Iliadis 5		Pts: Čekovský 17; Rebs: Čekovský 16; Asts: Novysedlák 7

University Sport Hall, Pitești
Attendance: 50
Referees: Milosav Kaluđerović (MNE), Walid Marcel Abirached (LIB), Gellert Kapitany (HUN)

21 July 2013
14:00

Report

Luxembourg	67–68	Slovakia
Scoring by quarter: 23–15, 8–15, 30–21, 6–17

University Sport Hall, Pitești

21 July 2013
16:15

Report

Finland	66–57	Cyprus
Scoring by quarter: 12–15, 22–6, 16–24, 16–12

University Sport Hall, Pitești

== Playoffs ==
5th place match
21 July
B2	Switzerland	68
B3	Portugal	74
7th place match
21 July
B4	Netherlands	62
A4	Romania	71

5th–8th place semifinals
20 July
B4	Netherlands	48
B2	Switzerland	59
20 July
A4	Romania	59
B3	Portugal	80

Quarterfinals
19 July
A1	Great Britain	95
B4	Netherlands	57
19 July
B2	Switzerland	61
A3	Hungary	74
19 July
B1	Belgium	72
A4	Romania	68
19 July
A2	Poland	82
B3	Portugal	57

Semifinals
20 July
A1	Great Britain	70
A3	Hungary	61
20 July
B1	Belgium	46
A2	Poland	57

Final
21 July
A1	Great Britain	71
A2	Poland	83
3rd place match
21 July
A3	Hungary	70
B1	Belgium	69

=== Quarterfinals ===
19 July 2013
16:10

Report

Great Britain	95–57	Netherlands
Scoring by quarter: 25–17, 23–12, 24–14, 23–14
Pts: Van Oostrum 34; Rebs: Lewis 8 Asts: Van Oostrum 4		Pts: Bouwknecht 17; Rebs: Schaftenaar 7 Asts: Hope, Vos 3

Sala Sporturilor "Trivale", Pitești
Attendance: 150
Referees: Carlos Peruga (ESP), Dragan Kralj (BIH), Gellert Kapitany (HUN)

19 July 2013
15:45

Report

Poland	82–57	Portugal
Scoring by quarter: 25–17, 12–12, 26–15, 19–13
Pts: Karnowski, Ponitka 22; Rebs: Karnowski 10; Asts: Koelner, Matczak 4		Pts: Correia de Sá 10; Rebs: Castela, Ventura 6 Asts: Cardoso, Ventura 3

Sala Sporturilor "Trivale", Pitești
Attendance: 200
Referees: Florin Grigoras (ROU), Amit Balak (ISR), Markos Michaelides (SUI)

19 July 2013
18:00

Report

Belgium	72–68	Romania
Scoring by quarter: 17–9, 19–19, 24–19, 12–21
Pts: Lecomte 34; Rebs: Mollekens 13; Asts: Lecomte 6		Pts: Olah 20; Rebs: Olah 8 Asts: Stoicoviciu 3

Sala Sporturilor "Trivale", Pitești
Attendance: 350
Referees: Tomislav Hordov (CRO), Milan Brziak (SVK), Wojciech Liszka (POL)

19 July 2013
20:15

Report

Switzerland	61–74	Hungary
Scoring by quarter: 15–20, 18–22, 14–19, 14–13
Pts: Affolter 15; Rebs: Mladjan 13; Asts: Mladjan 3		Pts: Allen 20; Rebs: Allen 16; Asts: Allen, Pongó 4

Sala Sporturilor "Trivale", Pitești
Attendance: 50
Referees: Fernando Rocha (POR), Charalampos Santos (CYP), Robert Hickman (ENG)

=== 5th–8th place semifinals ===
20 July 2013
13:30

Report

Netherlands	48–59	Switzerland
Scoring by quarter: 16–11, 9–12, 13–10, 10–26

Sala Sporturilor "Trivale", Pitești

20 July 2013
15:45

Report

Romania	59–80	Portugal
Scoring by quarter: 16–17, 16–19, 8–19, 19–25

Sala Sporturilor "Trivale", Pitești

=== Championship semifinals ===
20 July 2013
18:00

Report

Great Britain	70–61	Hungary
Scoring by quarter: 24–17, 15–16, 10–18, 21–10

Sala Sporturilor "Trivale", Pitești

20 July 2013
20:15

Report

Belgium	46–57	Poland
Scoring by quarter: 13–24, 7–16, 12–10, 14–7

Sala Sporturilor "Trivale", Pitești

== Final classification games ==
=== 7th place game ===
21 July 2013
18:30

Netherlands	62–71	Romania
Scoring by quarter: 23–12, 6–18, 17–13, 16–28

University Hall, Pitești

=== 5th place game ===
21 July 2013
15:00

Report

Switzerland	68–74	Portugal
Scoring by quarter: 14–27, 19–21, 17–17, 18–9

Sala Sporturilor "Trivale", Pitești

=== Bronze medal game ===
21 July 2013
17:15

Report

Hungary	70–69	Belgium
Scoring by quarter: 24–13, 14–14, 18–20, 14–22

Sala Sporturilor "Trivale", Pitești

=== Final ===
21 July 2013
19:30

Great Britain	71–83	Poland
Scoring by quarter: 18–23, 24–19, 11–20, 18–21

Sala Sporturilor "Trivale", Pitești
Attendance: 500
Referees: Fernando Rocha (POR), Florin Grigoras (ROU), Tomislav Hordov (CRO)

== Final standings ==
Rank	Team
Gold medal	Poland
Silver medal	Great Britain
Bronze medal	Hungary
4th	Belgium
5th	Portugal
6th	Switzerland
7th	Romania
8th	Netherlands
9th	Slovakia
10th	Finland
11th	Cyprus
12th	Luxembourg

Team promoted to 2014 Division A

== Awards ==
U20 European Championship Men 2012 Division B winner

Poland
First title

Most Valuable Player
(United Kingdom) Devon Van Oostrum

All-Tournament Team

- (United Kingdom) Devon Van Oostrum
- (Poland) Mateusz Ponitka
- (Poland) Przemyslaw Karnowski
- (Hungary) Rosco Allen
- (Belgium) Emmanuel Lecomte
