= List of glaciers of Kaiser Wilhelm II Land =

Location of Kaiser Wilhelm II Land (red), Australian Antarctic Territory in Antarctica

Following is a list of glaciers of Kaiser Wilhelm II Land in Antarctica. This list may not reflect recently named glaciers in Kaiser Wilhelm II Land.

== Burton Island Glacier ==
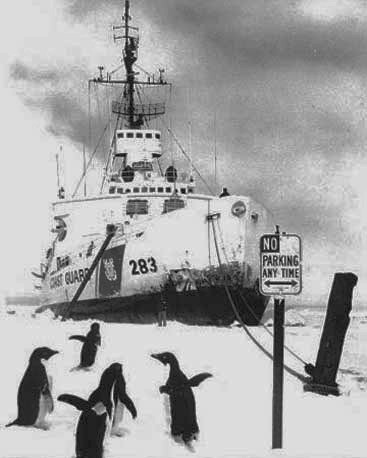
USS 'Burton Island

66°49′S 90°20′E. Channel glacier, about 9 nautical miles (17 km; 10 mi) wide and 7 nautical miles (13 km; 8.1 mi) long, flowing north from the continental ice to Posadowsky Bay just west of Cape Torson. Mapped from aerial photographs taken by United States Navy (USN) Operation Highjump (OpHjp), 1946-47. Named by the Advisory Committee on Antarctic Names (US-ACAN) for the USS Burton Island, one of the two icebreakers of USN Operation Windmill (OpWml), 1947-48, which assisted in establishing astronomical control stations along Wilhelm II, Queen Mary, Knox and Budd Coasts.

== Jones Glacier ==
66°36′S 91°30′E. Channel glacier, 5 nautical miles (9.3 km; 5.8 mi) wide and 6 nautical miles (11 km; 6.9 mi) long, flowing north from the continental ice to the coast close east of Krause Point. Delineated from aerial photographs taken by USN OpHjp, 1946-47, and named by US-ACAN for Ens. Teddy E. Jones, USNR, photo interpreter with the Naval Photographic Interpretation Center, who served as recorder and assistant with the USN OpWml parties which established astronomical control stations along Wilhelm II, Knox and Budd Coasts in 1947–48.

== Philippi Glacier ==
66°45′S 88°20′E. Coastal glacier about 15 nautical miles (28 km; 17 mi) long, flowing north to the east end of the West Ice Shelf, 15 nautical miles (28 km; 17 mi) west of Gaussberg. Delineated from aerial photographs taken by USN OpHjp, 1946-47. Named by the ANCA for Emil Philippi, geologist with the Gauss expedition under Erich von Drygalski, 1901-03, who made scientific observations in the vicinity of Gaussberg.

== Posadowsky Glacier ==
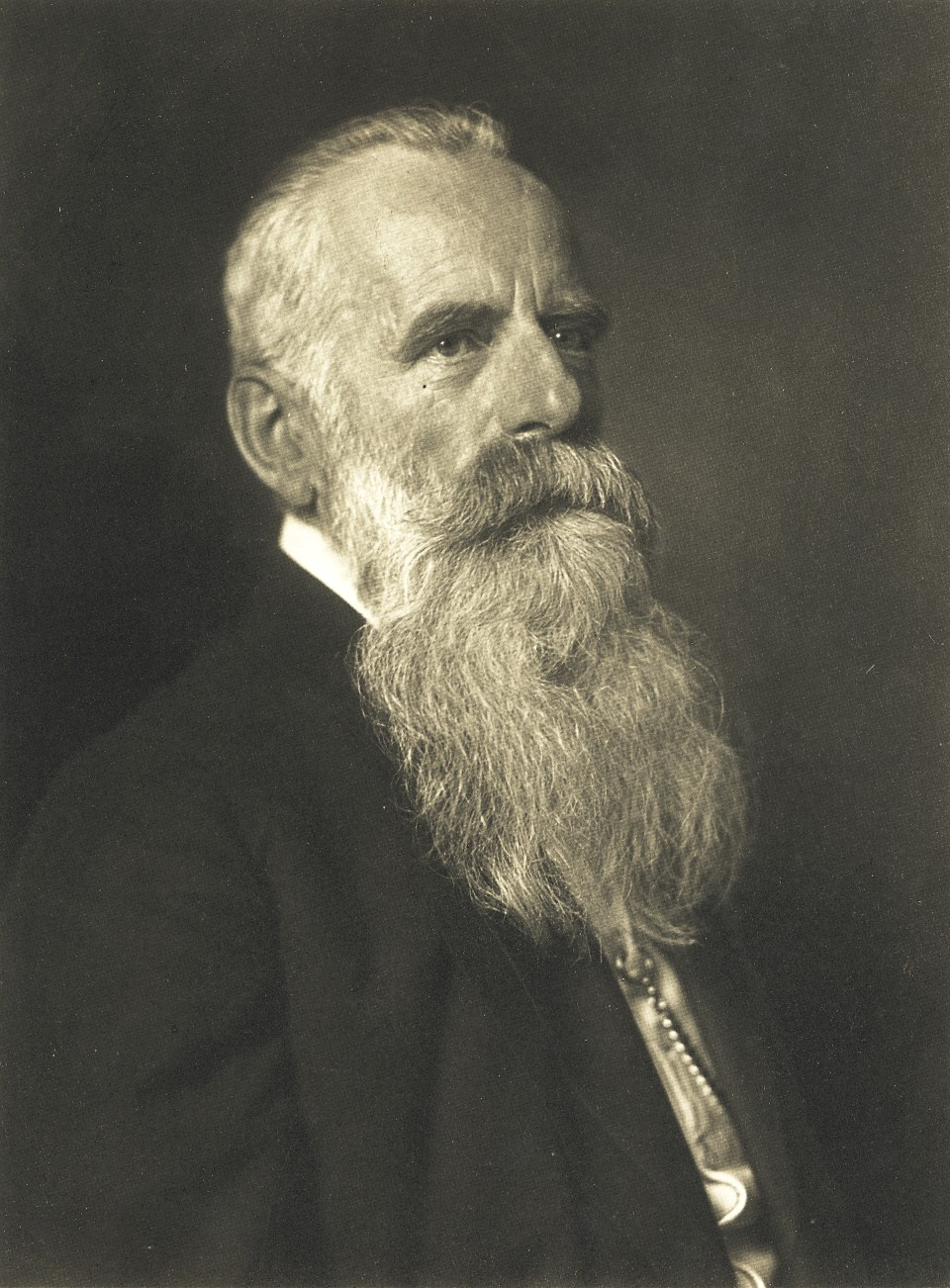
Arthur von Posadowsky-Wehner, for whom several Antarctic features were named

66°50′S 89°25′E Glacier about 9 nautical miles (17 km; 10 mi) long, flowing north to Posadowsky Bay immediately east of Gaussberg. The glacier was observed from the summit of Gaussberg by the Gauss expedition under Drygalski, 1901-03. It was named after Drygalski's Posadowsky Bay by US-ACAN in 1955 following studies of the aerial photographs taken by USN OpHjp, 1946-47.

== Sources ==
- Alberts, Fred G., ed. (1995), Geographic Names of the Antarctic (PDF) (2 ed.), United States Board on Geographic Names This article incorporates public domain material from websites or documents of the United States Board on Geographic Names.
