= Posadowsky Glacier (Antarctica) =

Glacier in Antarctica

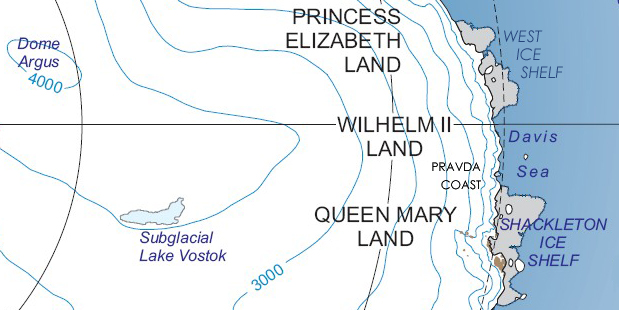
- Kaiser Wilhelm II Land

- Location within Antarctica
- Type: tidewater
- Location: Kaiser Wilhelm II Land
- Coordinates: 66°50′S 89°25′E
- Length: 9 nmi (17 km; 10 mi)
- Thickness: unknown
- Terminus: Posadowsky Bay, Davis Sea
- Status: unknown

Posadowsky Glacier (German: Posadowskygletscher, 66°50′S 89°25′E) is a glacier about 9 nautical miles (17 kilometers; 10 miles) long, flowing north to Posadowsky Bay immediately east of Gaussberg. Posadowsky Bay is an open embayment, located just east of the West Ice Shelf and fronting on the Davis Sea in Kaiser Wilhelm II Land.

Kaiser Wilhelm II Land is the part of East Antarctica lying between Cape Penck, at 87°43'E, and Cape Filchner, at 91°54'E, and is claimed by Australia as part of the Australian Antarctic Territory. Other notable geographic features in this area include Drygalski Island (65°45′S 92°30′E), located 45 mi NNE of Cape Filchner in the Davis Sea, and Mirny Station (66°34′S 93°01′E), a Russian scientific research station.

== Discovery and naming ==
The glacier was observed in February 1902 from the summit of Gaussberg by the Gauss expedition under Erich von Drygalski. The U.S. Advisory Committee on Antarctic Names (US-ACAN) named the glacier after Drygalski's Posadowsky Bay in 1955 following studies of the aerial photographs taken by United States Navy Operation Highjump, 1946–47. Posadowsky Bay, in turn, was named for Count Arthur von Posadowsky-Wehner, Secretary of the Interior of the German Empire, who secured a government grant to cover the cost of the Drygalski expedition.

== See also ==
- List of glaciers in the Antarctic
- Glaciology
