= Karelin Bay =

Bay in Antarctica

Karelin Bay (66°30′S 85°0′E) is a bay-like indentation in the middle of the north part of the West Ice Shelf, Antarctica. Leskov Island lies immediately southeast of the bay. It was mapped by the Soviet Antarctic Expedition, 1956, and named for professor of oceanography Dmitriy Karelin.
