= Leskov =

Leskov (Russian: Леско́в) may refer to:

- Ivan Leskov (born 1977), Russian football player
- Nikolai Leskov (1831–1895), Russian novelist
- Leskov Island in the southern Atlantic Ocean
- Leskov Island (Antarctica) in the West Ice Shelf of Antarctica

== See also ==
- Leskova
