= Laskov =

Laskov is the name of several locations or persons:

- Laškov, a village and municipality (obec) in the Czech Republic
- Bozhin Laskov (Божин Георгиев Ласков), a Bulgarian association football player
- Haim Laskov (Chaim Laskov, Khaim Laskov), the fifth Chief of Staff of the Israel Defense Forces
- Petra Laskov, a fictional character exclusive to the Ultimate Marvel universe that's known as Insect Queen and Red Wasp
- Tzipora Laskov, Israeli nurse and politician

== See also ==
- Leskov (disambiguation)
