= List of mountains of Princess Elizabeth Land =

The mountains of Princess Elizabeth Land are located in the region Princess Elizabeth Land, East Antarctica, between 73° E and 87° 55' 20" E. This region is claimed by Australia as part of the Australian Antarctic Territory. The area is highly glaciated. The availability of reliable data for this region is limited, making the list incomplete and inaccurate. The highest peaks, including nunataks and ice domes, are listed below:

| Name | Elevation (meters) | Location | Coordinates | GNIS ID | SCAR ID |
|---|---|---|---|---|---|
| Dome Argus | 4000 | Antarctic Plateau | 81°S 77°E | 577 | 501 |
| Mount Harding | 2343 | Grove Mountains | 72°53′33″S 75°01′23.6″E | 6369 | 6003 |
| Mount Brown | 1982 | | 68°35′S 86°05′E | 2005 | 1932 |
| Pionerskiy Dome | | | 73°59′S 73°8′E | 11822 | 11306 |

== See also ==
- List of mountains of East Antarctica
