= Philippi Glacier =

Philippi Glacier may refer to:

- Philippi Glacier, South Georgia
- Philippi Glacier, Antarctica
