= Krause Point =

Ice-covered point in Antarctica

Krause Point (66°34′S 91°4′E) is a low, ice-covered point in Antarctica, fronting on Davis Sea midway between Cape Torson and Cape Filchner. It was mapped from air photos taken by U.S. Navy Operation Highjump, 1946–47.

It was named by the Advisory Committee on Antarctic Names for Glenn R. Krause, a photogrammetrist with the Navy Hydrographic Office, who served as a surveyor with the U.S. Navy Operation Windmill parties which established astronomical control stations along Wilhelm II, Knox and Budd coasts in 1947–48.
