= Posadowsky Glacier =

Posadowsky Glacier may refer to:

- Posadowsky Glacier (Antarctica)
- Posadowsky Glacier (Bouvet Island)
