= Depot Lake =

Lake in Australian sector of Antarctica

- Location within Antarctica
- Location: Princess Elizabeth Land, East Antarctica
- Coordinates: 68°34′23″S 78°21′42″E
- Surface elevation: 8.3 m (27 ft)

Depot Lake is an approximately 600 m (2,000 ft) long and irregularly shaped lake on the Ingrid-Christensen coast of the Princess Elisabeth Land in East Antarctica.

It is located in the Vestfold Hills where scientists from the Australian National Antarctic Research Expeditions established a depot here in 1978. The Antarctic Names Committee of Australia named the lake Depot Lake in 1983.

== Literature ==
- John Stewart: Antarctica – An Encyclopedia. Bd. 1, McFarland & Co., Jefferson and London 2011, ISBN 978-0-7864-3590-6, p. 420
