= Miguel Cardoso =

Miguel Cardoso may refer to:

- Abraham Miguel Cardoso (c. 1626–1706), Spanish Jewish prophet and physician
- Miguel Esteves Cardoso (born 1955), Portuguese writer, translator, critic and journalist
- Miguel Cardoso (footballer, born 1994), Portuguese footballer
- Miguel Cardoso (basketball) (born 1993), Portuguese basketball player
- Miguel Cardoso (football manager) (born 1972), Portuguese football manager
