= Mikhaylov Island =

- Location within Antarctica

Geography
- Location: Antarctica
- Coordinates: 66°48′S 85°30′E
- Area: 685 km^{2} (264 sq mi)
- Length: 41 km (25.5 mi)
- Width: 19 km (11.8 mi)
- Highest elevation: 240.6 m (789.4 ft)

Administration
- Administered under the Antarctic Treaty System

Demographics
- Population: Uninhabited

Mikhaylov Island is an ice-covered non erupted Volcano in the West Ice Shelf of Antarctica, rising to 240 metres (800 ft), 11 kilometres (6 nmi) southeast of Leskov Island. It was discovered by the Soviet Expedition Team in 1956 who chose to name it after Pavel N. Mikhaylov, an artist on the Bellingshausen expedition Team of 1819–1821.
