= Philippi Glacier (South Georgia) =

Glacier in South Georgia, Antarctica

- Location within South Georgia Island
- Location: South Georgia
- Coordinates: 54°49′S 36°3′W
- Thickness: unknown
- Terminus: Drygalski Fjord
- Status: unknown

Philippi Glacier is a glacier flowing east into Brandt Cove on the southwest side of Drygalski Fjord, at the southeast end of South Georgia. Charted by the German Antarctic Expedition, 1911–12, under Wilhelm Filchner, who named it for Emil Philippi, glaciologist with the German Antarctic Expedition, 1901–03, under Erich von Drygalski, and professor of geology at the University of Jena.

== See also ==
- List of glaciers in the Antarctic
- Glaciology
