= Béliers de Kemper =

Quimper Rams
- Nickname: Rams
- Leagues: LNB Pro B
- Founded: 1984; 42 years ago
- History: UJAP Quimper 29 (1984–2020); Béliers de Kemper – UJAP 1984 (2020–present)
- Arena: Kostum Park
- Capacity: 3,499
- Location: Quimper, France
- Team colors: Blue and white
- President: Maxime Laizé
- Head coach: Philippe Da Silva
- Website: www.beliersdekemper.bzh
Home	Away

Béliers de Kemper (in English: Quimper Rams), known before the 2020–21 season as UJAP Quimper 29, is a French basketball club based in Quimper. The home arena of the club is the Kostum Park, which has a capacity of 3,499. The club currently plays in the LNB Pro B, the second highest level league of France.

== History ==
In 1984, the two auspices of Quimper fusion; the Jeanne d'Arc and the Phalange d'Arvor, which gives birth the Union Jeanne d'Arc Phalange Quimper. L’UJAP was, at the beginning of the 1990s, the biggest club of France in term of college graduates (about 550).

On 23 June 2020, the club announced a renaming to Béliers de Kemper.

== Club honors ==
- NM1
  - Winners (1): 2002–03
- Pro B
  - Runners-up (1): 2006–07

== Notable players ==
Note: Flags indicate national team eligibility at FIBA-sanctioned events. Players may hold other non-FIBA nationalities not displayed.

Criteria

To appear in this section a player must have either:

- Set a club record or won an individual award while at the club
- Played at least one official international match for their national team at any time
- Played at least one official NBA match at any time.

- (Portugal) Miguel Cardoso
- (Angola) Valdelício Joaquim
- (Philippines) Matthew Wright
- (Republic of the Congo) Junior Etou
