= Barrier Bay =

Antarctic bay

Coordinates: 67°45′S 081°15′E

Barrier Bay is an open bay in the Antarctic coastal angle formed by the coast and the western end of the West Ice Shelf. Charted by Norwegian cartographers from aerial photographs taken by the Lars Christensen Expedition, 1936–1937, and named by them Barrierevika (Barrier Bay). Barrier is an obsolete term for ice shelf.
