= Branislav Kostić =

Serbian footballer (born 1949)

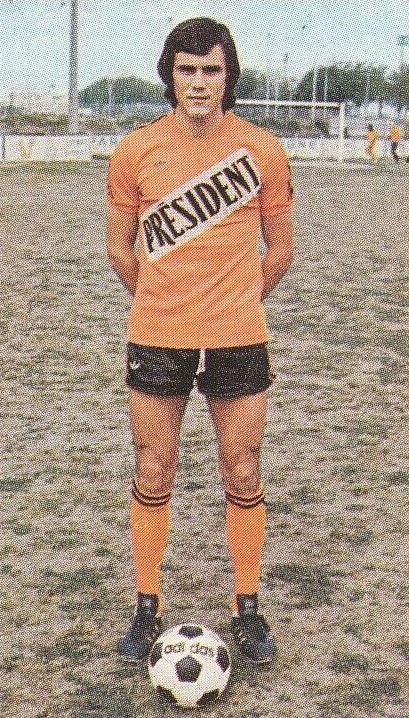
- Kostić in 1976

Personal information
- Full name: Branislav Kostić
- Date of birth: 25 November 1949
- Place of birth: Leskova, Serbia, Yugoslavia
- Date of death: 28 June 2011 (aged 61)
- Place of death: Leskova, Raška, Serbia
- Position: Defensive midfielder

Senior career*
Years	Team	Apps	(Gls)
1970–1973	Stade Lavallois		
1974	US Albi		
1974–1977	Stade Lavallois		
1977–1981	Amicale de Lucé		
- * Club domestic league appearances and goals

Branislav Kostić (25 November 1949 – 28 June 2011) was a Serbian footballer. Nicknamed "Branko", he spent his career across France throughout the 1970s, primarily playing for Stade Lavallois and Amicale de Lucé throughout the decade.

== Career ==
=== Stade Lavallois (1970–1977) ===
In December 1970, Kostić arrived at Stade Lavallois, which had just reached Ligue 2. He arrived from his native Yugoslavia and did not speak French at all but was helped in his integration by his teammate and compatriot Ivan Matijašić, an experienced Yugoslav international.

The team ensured a comfortable survival every season and Kostić was a key player until 1973. He was no longer a member of the club during the 1973-74 season because of a disagreement with its staff but continued to train with his former teammates whilst opening discussions with neighboring club US du Mans and Paris FC. The following season, he left to play for US Albi within the 1973–74 Ligue 3 for a few months but failed to adapt to the South-West soon returned to the Mayenne-based club. He officially returned to Stade Lavallois in December 1974. Short of competition after two years without much activity, his spot within the Starting XI was replaced and he was thus sent to the C team.

For the 1975-1976 season, the Laval team was made up of several experienced players and was close to taking first place at Stade Rennais, which was played until the last matchday. Second, the club had to play a series of two-legged promotional play-off matches against Red Star within Group B. After winning both games, the club was promoted to the top-flight of French football. Despite this, Kostić played only two games during the year as the number of foreign players who could be fielded were limited to just two, and with Les Tango already having Senegalese midfielder Souleymane Camara and German forward Georg Tripp firmly within the starting XI, Kostić mainly played within the reserve team in the regionals.

Following a difficult start to their first season as a professional club, the Stadistes climbed to eighth place before experiencing a more difficult second half of the league, which did not prevent Laval from staying up. In his first season in within the Ligue 1, Laval managed to finish sixteenth and Kostić took part in 24 matches, holding the positions of libero, left or right back, stopper and defensive midfielder, and coming out on top each time with happiness.

He left the club in 1977 following the arrival of Argentinian midfielder Joaquim Martínez as with the regulations only accepting two foreigners in the starting XI with the second slot being occupied by Chilean midfielder Ignacio Prieto.

=== Amicale de Lucé (1977–1981) ===
In 1977, Branislav Kostić joined the Amicale de Lucé, which played its second season within the Ligue 2. With former international André Grillon as coach, Lucéens have had a rollercoaster of results. They faced the reigning Ligue 1 champion Nantes for the match of the century in Eure-et-Loir in the last 16 for the 1977–78 Coupe de France. Lucé then went through a bad patch in the league, not winning a game until mid-March as the Lucéens finished in eighth place.

In 1978-1979, Kostić played less and was no longer part of the Starting XI for the club. Amicale then finished the season with an eleventh-place finish. During the 1979-80 season, which saw Lucé relegated, the Serbian did not take part in any matches. For the 1980–81 Championnat National, Kostić returned to the field and played fifteen games before retiring at the end of the season.

== Personal life ==
Kostić had returned to his hometown and died on 28 June 2011 from leukemia diagnosed in 2007.

== Career statistics ==
Club	Season	League		National Cups		Total	
Club	Season	Matches	Goals	Matches	Goals	Matches	Goals
Stade Lavallois; France
Stade Lavallois; France	1970–71	14	2	-	-	14	2
Stade Lavallois; France	1971–72	30	1	2	0	32	1
Stade Lavallois; France	1972–73	28	0	0	0	28	0
Stade Lavallois; France	1974–75	0	0	0	0	0	0
Stade Lavallois; France	1974–75	0	0	0	0	0	0
Stade Lavallois; France	1975–76	2	0	0	0	2	0
Stade Lavallois; France	1976–77	24	1	1	0	25	1
Stade Lavallois; France	Total Record	98	4	0	0	101	3
US Albi; France
US Albi; France	1973–74	6	0	1	0	7	0
US Albi; France	Total Record	7	0	0	0	7	0
Amicale de Lucé; France
Amicale de Lucé; France	1977-78	32	0	3	0	35	0
Amicale de Lucé; France	1978-79	16	3	0	0	16	3
Amicale de Lucé; France	1979-80	0	0	0	0	0	0
Amicale de Lucé; France	1980–81	15	1	0	0	15	1
Amicale de Lucé; France	Total Record	63	4	3	0	66	4
