= Mount Brown (Antarctica) =

Mountain in Princess Elizabeth Land, Antarctica

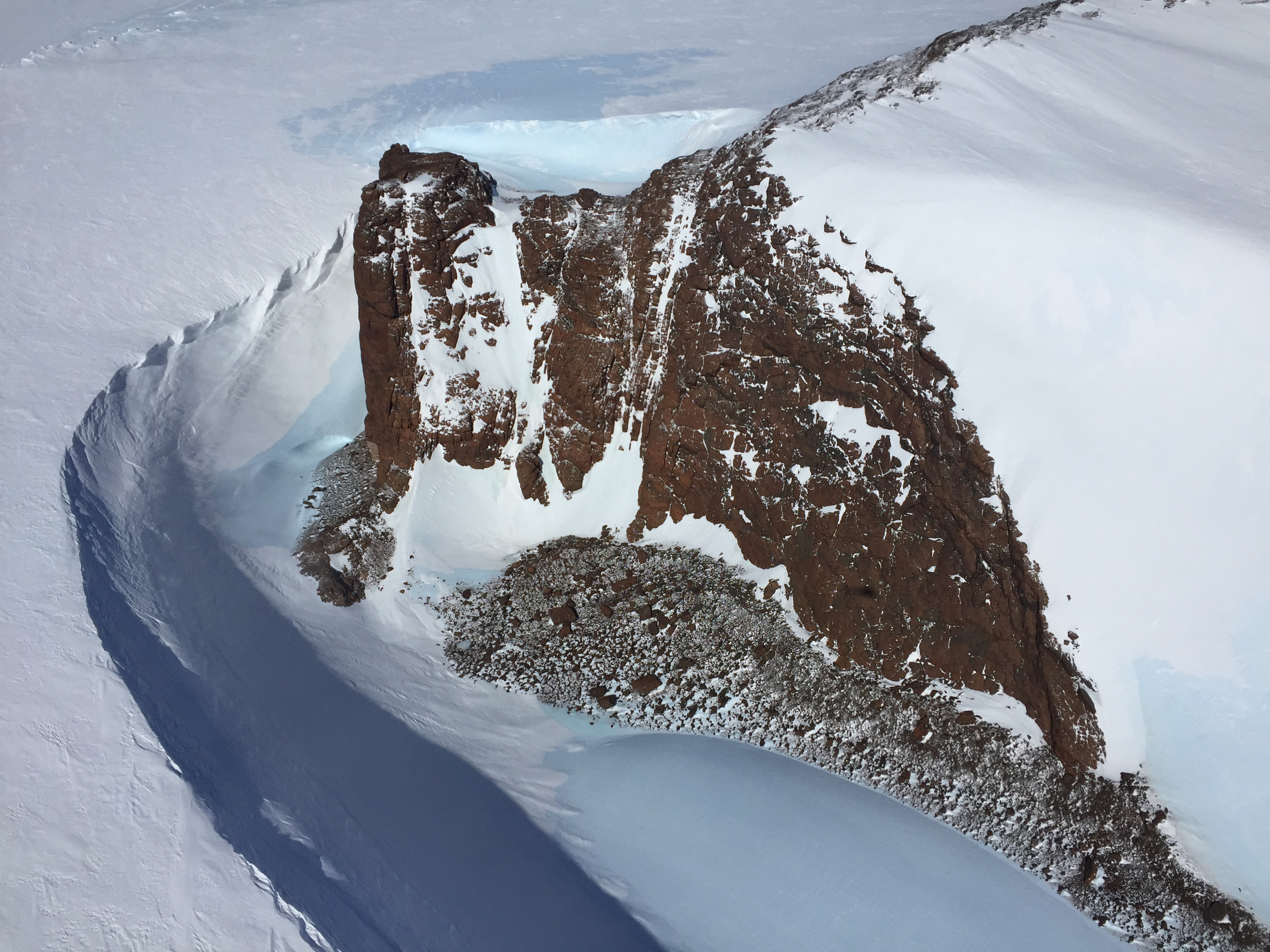
Northern tip of Mount Brown

Mount Brown (68°33′57.6″S 86°06′2.8″E) is an elongated rock peak protruding slightly above the continental ice, situated 200 miles (320 km) east of the Vestfold Hills and 100 miles (160 km) south-southwest of Cape Penck in Antarctica. It was delineated from aerial photos taken by U.S. Navy Operation Highjump (1946–47), and named by the Advisory Committee on Antarctic Names for Lieutenant (j.g.) Eduardo P. Brown, U.S. Navy, photographic officer for the Western Group of the expedition.
