= Leopold and Astrid Coast =

The Leopold and Astrid Coast (67°20′S 84°30′E) is that portion of the coast of Antarctica lying between the western extremity of the West Ice Shelf, at 81°24′E, and Cape Penck, at 87°43′E. It is located in the eastern half of Princess Elizabeth Land.

== Exploration ==
It was discovered and explored in an airplane flight from the Norwegian ship Thorshavn on January 17, 1934, by Lieutenant Alf Gunnestad and Captain Nils Larsen. The coast was named by Lars Christensen, Norwegian whaling magnate and leader of the expedition, for King Leopold and Queen Astrid of Belgium.
