= Princess Elizabeth Land =

Australian Antarctic claim

Coordinates: 80°00′S 78°00′E

Location of Princess Elizabeth Land (red), Australian Antarctic Territory in Antarctica

Princess Elizabeth Land is the sector of Antarctica between longitude 73° east and Cape Penck (at 87°43' east). The sector is claimed by Australia as part of the Australian Antarctic Territory, although this claim is not widely recognised.

== Geography ==
Princess Elizabeth Land is located between 64°56'S and 90°00'S and between 73°35' E and 87°43'E. It is divided into two sectors:

- Ingrid Christensen Coast, 73°35'E to 81°24'E
- Leopold and Astrid Coast, 81°24'E to 87°43'E

It is bounded on the west by Amery Ice Shelf, Mac. Robertson Land, and on the east by Kaiser Wilhelm II Land.

== Exploration ==
Princess Elizabeth Land was discovered on 9 February 1931, by the British Australian and New Zealand Antarctic Research Expedition (BANZARE) (1929–31) under Sir Douglas Mawson. Princess Elizabeth Land was named by Mawson after Princess Elizabeth, granddaughter of King George V who reigned at the time as King of Australia, among his other titles. Princess Elizabeth would later go on to become Queen Elizabeth II in 1952. This is one of two regions of Antarctica to be named for her. The other is Queen Elizabeth Land located across the continent in the British Antarctic Territory and named in 2012 in honour of the Queen's Diamond Jubilee.

== Fauna and flora ==
Adélie penguin on the South Shetland Islands

The fauna of Princess Elizabeth Land features a variety of birds and seals, the most notable being the Adélie penguin, southern giant petrel, (Note: These species are found all over the East Antarctic Tundra, a bioregion that includes Princess Elizabeth Land.) and Weddell and Crabeater seals. (Note: Weddell and Crabeater seals are found all over the coast of Antarctica.) The flora of Princess Elizabeth Land, on the other hand, is dominated by lichen and moss, but also includes liverwort species.

== Research stations ==
Although Australia claims the entirety of Princess Elizabeth Land, it is home to Russian stations including Vostok Station (the coldest place on Earth) and Progress Station which supplies it. The most notable Australian research station is the Davis Station.

== See also ==
- List of mountains of Princess Elizabeth Land
- Queen Elizabeth Land
- Queen Elizabeth Islands
