= Laškov =

- Municipality
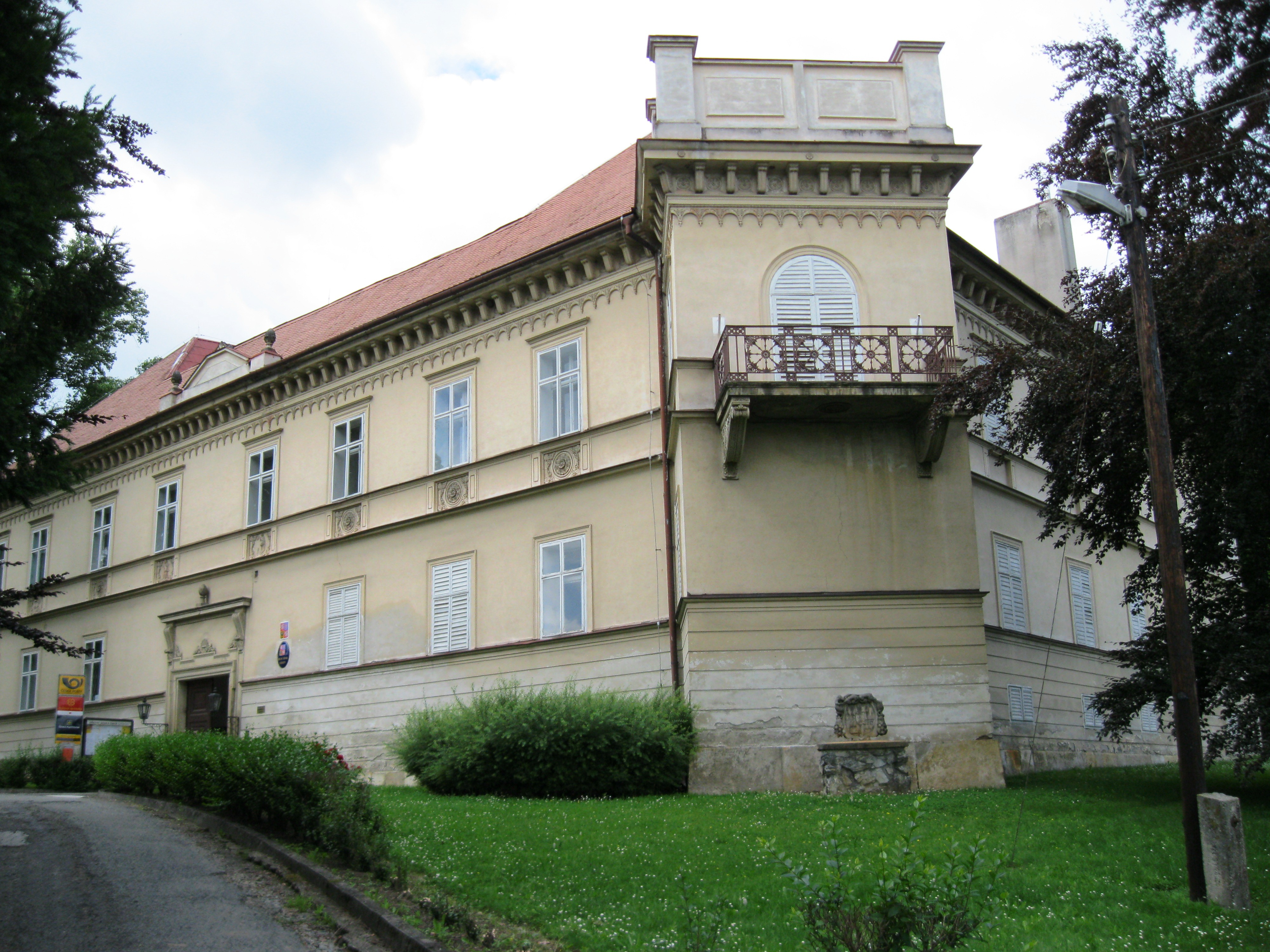
- Laškov Castle

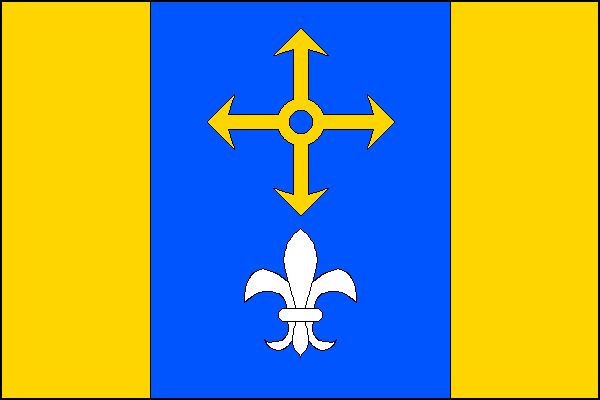
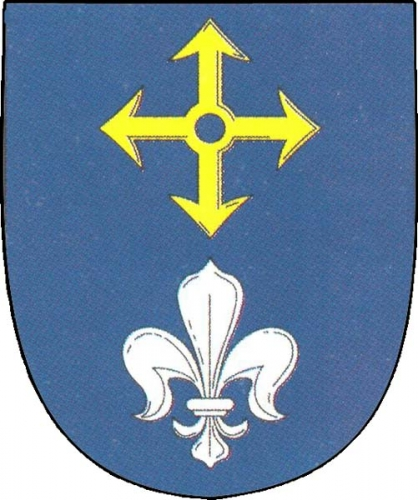
- Flag Coat of arms

- Location in the Czech Republic
- Coordinates: 49°35′3″N 17°0′8″E
- Country: Czech Republic
- Region: Olomouc
- District: Prostějov
- First mentioned: 1349

Area
  - Total: 12.86 km^{2} (4.97 sq mi)
- Elevation: 301 m (988 ft)

Population (2026-01-01)
  - Total: 575
  - Density: 44.7/km^{2} (116/sq mi)
- Time zone: UTC+1 (CET)
  - Summer (DST): UTC+2 (CEST)
- Postal code: 798 57
- Website: www.laskov.cz

Laškov is a municipality and village in Prostějov District in the Olomouc Region of the Czech Republic. It has about 600 inhabitants.

Laškov lies approximately 15 kilometres (9 mi) north-west of Prostějov, 19 km (12 mi) west of Olomouc, and 194 km (121 mi) east of Prague.

== Administrative division ==
Laškov consists of four municipal parts (in brackets population according to the 2021 census):

- Laškov (282)
- Dvorek (75)
- Kandia (101)
- Krakovec (89)

== Demographics ==
Historical population
Year	Pop.	±%
1869	1,122	—
1880	1,126	+0.4%
1890	1,126	+0.0%
1900	1,098	−2.5%
1910	1,067	−2.8%
1921	1,055	−1.1%
1930	1,044	−1.0%
1950	843	−19.3%
1961	889	+5.5%
1970	811	−8.8%
1980	752	−7.3%
1991	623	−17.2%
2001	587	−5.8%
2011	563	−4.1%
2021	547	−2.8%
Source: Censuses
