= Ivan Leskov =

Russian footballer

Personal information
- Full name: Ivan Viktorovich Leskov
- Date of birth: 11 December 1977 (age 48)
- Height: 1.80 m (5 ft 11 in)
- Position: Defender

Senior career*
Years	Team	Apps	(Gls)
2000–2006	FC Zvezda Irkutsk	172	(4)
2007–2009	FC Chita	79	(1)
2010–2015	FC Baikal Irkutsk	84	(1)
- * Club domestic league appearances and goals

Ivan Viktorovich Leskov (Russian: Иван Викторович Лесков; born 11 December 1977) is a former Russian professional football player.

== Club career ==
He played in the Russian Football National League for FC Chita in 2009.
