= Posadowsky Bay =

Bay in Antarctica

Coordinates: 66°47′S 89°27′E

Posadowsky Bay (German: Posadowskybai) is an open embayment in the vicinity of Gaussberg, just east of the West Ice Shelf. Discovered in February 1902 by German Antarctic Expedition under Erich von Drygalski, who named it for Count Arthur von Posadowsky-Wehner, Imperial Home Secretary, who secured a government grant to cover the cost of the Drygalski expedition.
