= Stefanos Iliadis =

Cypriot basketball player

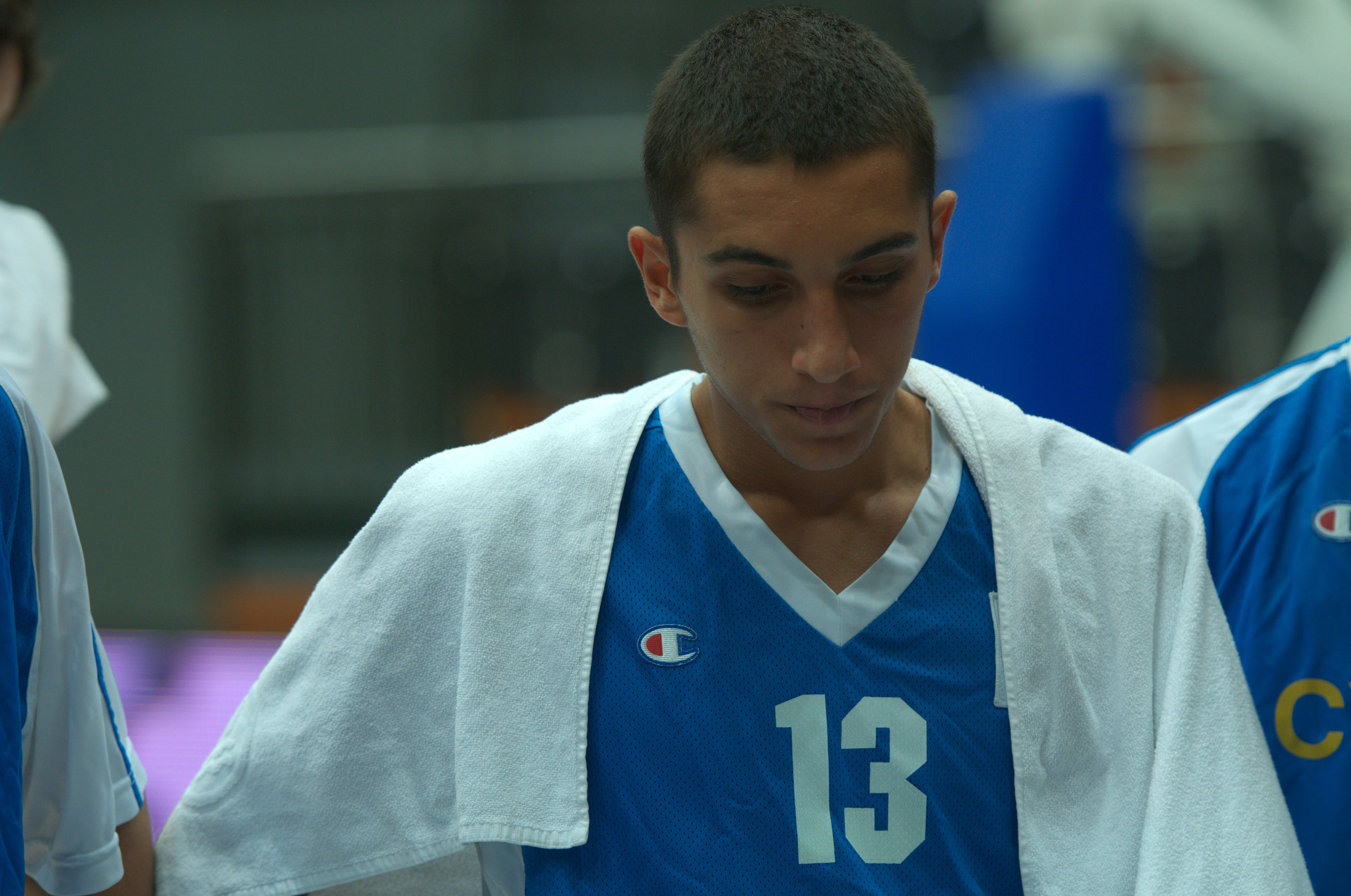
- Iliadis with the Cypriot national team

No. 6 – Apollon Limassol
- Position: Point guard
- League: Cypriot League

Personal information
- Born: 17 September 1994 (age 32) Limassol, Cyprus
- Listed height: 6 ft 1 in (1.85 m)
- Listed weight: 187 lb (85 kg)

Career information
- College: South Florida (2015–2017)
- NBA draft: 2016: undrafted
- Playing career: 2011–present

Career history
- 2011–2020: Apollon Limassol
- 2020–2021: APOEL
- 2021–2024: Apollon Limassol
- 2024–2025: Anorthosi
- 2025–present: Apollon Limassol

Career highlights
- Cypriot Cup champion (2014); 2x Cypriot League All-Star (2018, 2019)

Stefanos Iliadis (born September 17, 1994) is a Cypriot professional basketball player for Apollon Limassol of the Cypriot League. He studied for the University of South Florida, but he didn't manage to make it to the team's roster. Iliadis entered the 2016 NBA draft but was not selected in the draft's two rounds.

== College career ==
Iliadis studied for the University of South Florida, but he didn't manage to make it to the team's roster. During his studies, he was also playing for some games with Apollon Limassol in both the Cypriot League and to the FIBA EuroChallenge.

== Professional career ==
Iliadis made his professional debut with Apollon Limassol in 2011 against ENAD Ayiou Dometiou. Until 2017, he didn't manage to get a lot of games with the club, but during that period, he won the Cypriot Cup with the club in 2014. After 2017, he gained a bigger role in the team's squad, and from the 2018–19 season, he became the starting point guard of the club.

On May 27, 2020, Iliadis joined APOEL.

== Cyprus national team ==
Iliadis has been a member of the junior national teams of Cyprus for some years. He has also been a member of the Cyprus national team since 2017.
