= Artur Castela =

Portuguese basketball player (born 1993)

Galitos (on loan from Benfica)
- Position: Power forward / center
- League: LCB

Personal information
- Born: 30 July 1993 (age 33) Lisbon, Portugal

Career history
- 1999–2003: Portugal Telecom
- 2004: Ateneu Comercial de Lisboa
- 2005–2016: Benfica
- 2010: Centro de Alto Rendimento Jamor Masc
- 2015–2016: Galitos (loan)

Artur Castela (born July 30, 1993) is a Portuguese basketball player in the LCB league. His playing positions were Power forward / center. He most recently played for Galitos Barreiro in Portugal.

== Biography ==
In Portugal, Castela is the only and youngest player who have simultaneously achieved all titles of league champion (8 championships with his team and 2 times back-to-back league titles with the senior and U-20 teams in the same season) and internationalizations as a U-16, U-18 and U-20 player (65 times with the Portugal national team), having five years of experience in the European Basketball Championships (54 official FIBA matches).
