= Pionerskiy Dome =

Pionerskiy Dome (73°59′S 73°8′E) is an ice-covered summit about 60 nautical miles (110 km) south-southwest of the Grove Mountains in Antarctica. Discovered by the Soviet Antarctic Expedition in 1958 and named "Kupol Pionerskiy" (Pionerskiy Dome).
