= Cape Penck =

Coordinates: 66°43′45″S 87°55′20″E

Cape Penck is an ice-covered point fronting on the West Ice Shelf about 35 miles west-northwest of Gaussberg, separating the Leopold and Astrid Coast from the Wilhelm II Coast. It was roughly charted by the Western Base Party of the Australasian Antarctic Expedition, 1911–1914, under Mawson, and named for Albrecht Penck, an internationally known German geographer.
