= Cape Torson =

Cape Torson (66°40′S 90°36′E) is a point at the east side of Posadowsky Bay on the coast of Antarctica. First mapped from air photos taken by U.S. Navy Operation Highjump, 1946–47. Remapped by the Soviet expedition 1956, who named it after Lieutenant K.P. Torson, of the ship Vostok in the Bellingshausen expedition 1819–21.
