= Araneus drygalskii =

Scientific classification
- Kingdom: Animalia
- Phylum: Arthropoda
- Subphylum: Chelicerata
- Class: Arachnida
- Order: Araneae
- Infraorder: Araneomorphae
- Family: Araneidae
- Genus: Araneus
- Species: A. drygalskii

Binomial name
- Araneus drygalskii (Strand, 1909)

Species of spider

Araneus drygalskii is a species of spider in the family Araneidae. It is endemic to the Western Cape of South Africa.

== Distribution ==
Araneus drygalskii is known only from Simon's Town in the Western Cape, at an altitude of 86 m above sea level.

== Habitat and ecology ==
The male specimen was collected on 21 July 1903 from the Fynbos biome. Nothing is known about their behaviour.

== Conservation ==
Araneus drygalskii is listed as Data Deficient for Taxonomic reasons. The species is known from a single locality and identification is problematic as no drawings were provided in the original description, which is not detailed enough for species identification.

== Taxonomy ==
The species was originally described as Aranea drygalskii by Embrik Strand in 1909 from Simonstown. Due to the absence of type material in combination with the lack of recollection and illustration, there are strong arguments to consider this species as a nomen dubium.
