= Leskov Island (Antarctica) =

Ice-covered island in the West Ice Shelf of Antarctica

- Location within Antarctica

Geography
- Location: Antarctica
- Coordinates: 66°36′S 85°10′E
- Area: 49.5 km^{2} (19.1 sq mi)
- Length: 9 km (5.6 mi)
- Width: 5.5 km (3.42 mi)
- Highest elevation: 185 m (607 ft)

Administration
- Administered under the Antarctic Treaty System

Demographics
- Population: Uninhabited

Leskov Island is an ice-covered island in the West Ice Shelf of Antarctica, rising to 185 metres (600 ft), 11 kilometres (6 nmi) northwest of Mikhaylov Island. It was discovered by the First Russian Antarctic Expedition of 1819–21, and named after Lieutenant Leskov, one of the members of that expedition.
