= Dexter Hope =

Dutch basketball player

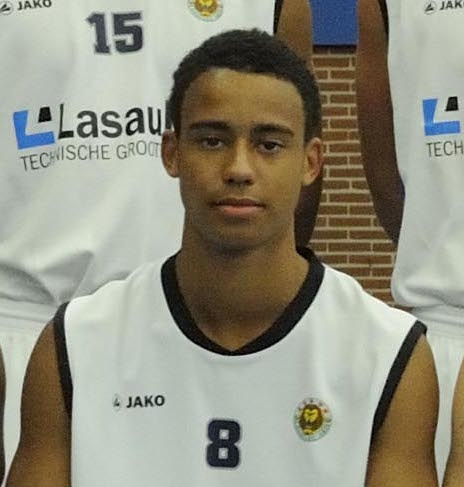
- Hope in 2011 with Aris

Free Agent
- Position: Point guard

Personal information
- Born: 30 January 1993 (age 33) Hoofddorp, Netherlands
- Listed height: 1.85 m (6 ft 1 in)

Career information
- Playing career: 2011–present

Career history
- 2011–2015: Aris Leeuwarden
- 2015–2016: Donar
- 2016–2017: Aris Leeuwarden
- 2017–2018: Rasta Vechta
- 2018–2022: Apollo Amsterdam

Career highlights
- DBL champion (2016); DBL All-Star (2015)

Dexter Hope (born 30 January 1993) is a Dutch basketball player who last played for Apollo Amsterdam of the BNXT League. Hope is a 6 ft 1 point guard or shooting guard.

== Early career ==
Hope played in the junior teams of BV Hoofddorp and Amsterdam Basketball.

== Professional career ==
Hope started his professional career in 2011 with Aris Leeuwarden. He played here for four seasons, before signing with Donar. With Donar, Hope won the Dutch Basketball League (DBL), the Dutch national championship, in 2016. In the 2016–17 season, Hope returned to Aris Leeuwarden.

On 20 July 2017 Hope signed with SC Rasta Vechta of the German second-tier league ProA.

In the 2018–19 season, Hope was a member of the roster of Apollo Amsterdam of the DBL. After the 2019–20 season, Hope retired from professional basketball but he returned to Apollo a half year later. On 5 August 2021, he extended his contract until 2022.

== National team career ==
Hope played for the Netherlands under-16, under-18 and under-20 teams.

In 2014, Hope was selected for the Netherlands senior team for the first time. He was part of the team that qualified for the Netherlands' first EuroBasket tournament in 25 years. Hope was not selected for the EuroBasket 2015 tournament.
