= Michal Čekovský =

Slovak basketball player (born 1994)

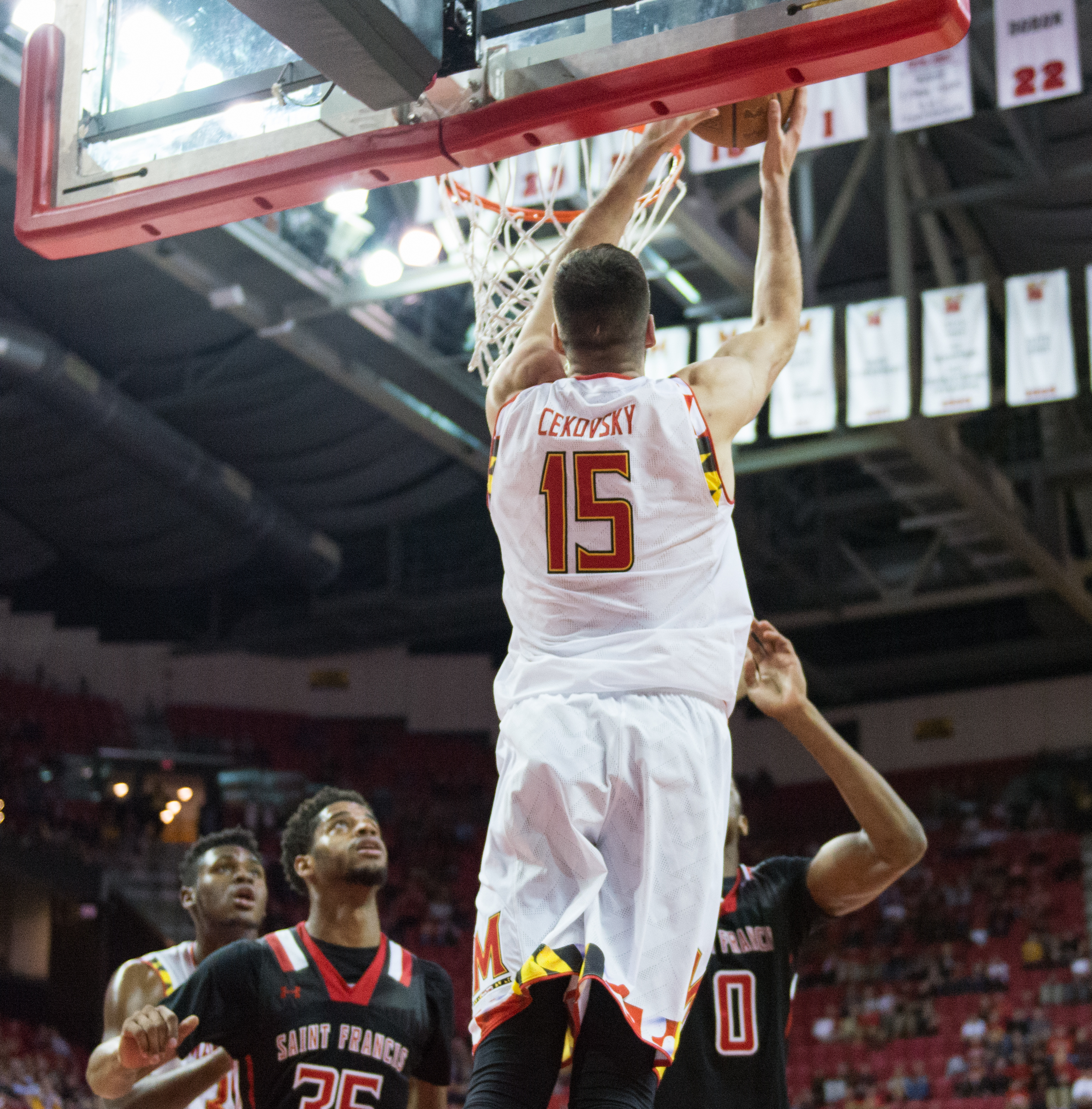
- Čekovský dunking for Maryland

No. 24 – Spišská Nová Ves
- Position: Power forward / center
- League: Slovak League

Personal information
- Born: June 17, 1994 (age 32) Košice, Slovakia
- Listed height: 7 ft 1 in (2.16 m)
- Listed weight: 250 lb (113 kg)

Career information
- High school: Canarias Basketball Academy (Tenerife, Spain)
- College: Maryland (2014–2018)
- NBA draft: 2018: undrafted
- Playing career: 2010–present

Career history
- 2010–2011: Považská Bystrica
- 2011–2013: Partizan
- 2018–2019: Baník Handlová
- 2019–2020: Inter Bratislava
- 2020–present: Spišská Nová Ves

Career highlights
- ABA League champion (2013); 2× Basketball League of Serbia champion (2012, 2013); Serbian Cup winner (2012)

Michal Čekovský (born June 17, 1994) is a Slovak basketball player. He played college basketball for the University of Maryland.

== College career ==
After one year with the Canarias Basketball Academy, Čekovský committed to Maryland in 2014.

SEASON AVERAGES
SEASON	TEAM	MIN	FGM-FGA	FG%	3PM-3PA	3P%	FTM-FTA	FT%	REB	AST	BLK	STL	PF	TO	PTS
2017-18	MD	16.9	2.7-4.0	.670	0.0-0.0	.000	1.1-1.7	.638	3.0	0.4	1.0	0.2	2.4	1.0	6.4
2016-17	MD	13.2	3.2-4.8	.671	0.0-0.0	.000	1.1-2.2	.514	2.8	0.5	1.2	0.1	2.5	0.9	7.6
2015-16	MD	8.6	0.8-1.5	.558	0.0-0.0	.000	0.7-1.3	.514	1.9	0.1	0.4	0.2	1.7	0.6	2.3
2014-15	MD	12.6	1.2-2.3	.522	0.0-0.0	.000	0.2-0.7	.286	2.5	0.1	0.6	0.1	2.1	0.5	2.6

== Professional career ==
Čekovský started his career with Považská Bystrica from Trenčín Region. He won the Slovak junior championship for the 2010–11 season. In the same season he played professional basketball. He was named the most promising young player of the Slovak Basketball League for that season. On June 24, 2011, Čekovský signed a contract with the Serbian team Partizan Belgrade.

== International career ==
Čekovský was a member of the Slovak U16 national team at the 2009 FIBA Europe Under-16 Championship Division B in Portugal.
