= Filip Matczak =

Polish basketball player (born 1993)

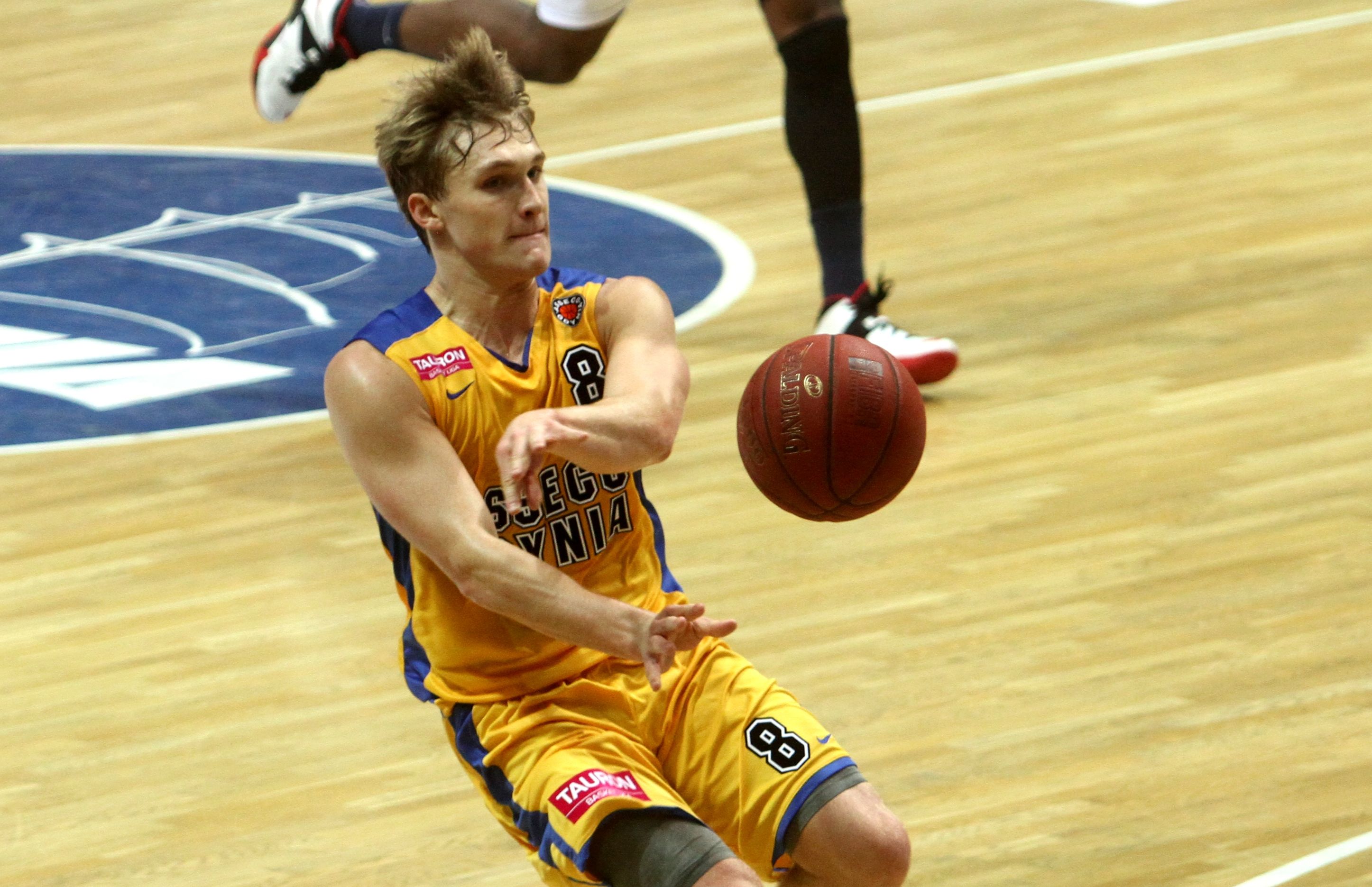

No. 8 – Zastal Zielona Góra
- Position: Shooting guard
- League: PLK

Personal information
- Born: 18 September 1993 (age 33) Zielona Góra, Poland
- Listed height: 6 ft 2 in (1.88 m)

Career information
- Playing career: 2009–present

Career history
- 2009–2010: Zastal Zielona Góra
- 2010–2011: SMS PZKosz Władysławowo
- 2011–2012: Zastal Zielona Góra
- 2012–2013: BM SLAM Stal Ostrów Wielkopolski
- 2013: Stelmet Zielona Góra
- 2013–2017: Asseco Gdynia
- 2017–2019: Stelmet Enea BC Zielona Góra
- 2019–2020: Legia Warszawa
- 2020–2021: PGE Spójnia Stargard
- 2021–2024: King Szczecin
- 2024: Krajowa Grupa Spożywcza Arka Gdynia
- 2024–present: Zastal Zielona Góra
Medals
U-17 World Championship
Silver medal – second place	2010 Hamburg
U-20 European Championship Division B
Gold medal – first place	2013 Romania
Polish Basketball League
Gold medal – first place	2012–2013
Gold medal – first place	2016–2017
Gold medal – first place	2022–2023
Bronze medal – third place	2011–2012

Filip Matczak (born 18 September 1993) is a Polish professional basketball player for Zastal Zielona Góra in the Polish Basketball League (PLK). He is playing in shooting guard position.

== Professional career ==
Matczak began his professional career with Zastal Zielona Góra during the 2009/2010 season when the team was competing in the Polish First League (I liga). In 2010, he was a member of the Polish national team that won the silver medal at the FIBA U-17 World Championship in Hamburg. Over the 2011/2012 and 2012/2013 seasons, he played a total of 22 games for the Zielona Góra team in the Polish Basketball League (PLK). During the second of these seasons, he was loaned to the first league team, Stal Ostrów Wielkopolski. In 2013, he was loaned again, this time to Asseco Gdynia in the PLK and remained with the club for several subsequent seasons.

In March 2017, Matczak returned to Stelmet Zielona Góra, winning the Polish championship with them. In February 2019, he was loaned to Legia Warszawa, where he played until the end of the season. He joined the club permanently in August 2019. In June 2020, he joined PGE Spójnia Stargard.

In May 2021, Matczak signed with King Szczecin. In March 2024, he returned to the Gdynia team – KGS Arka Gdynia.

On October 9, 2024, he signed with Zastal Zielona Góra of the Polish Basketball League (PLK).

== National team career ==
Matczak has represented Poland in various junior age categories – U-16, U-17, U-18, and U-20. In 2016, he was called up to the Poland B national team.

== Achievements ==
As of June 16, 2023, based on, unless otherwise noted.

=== Team ===
- Polish Basketball League Champion:
  - 2013, 2017, 2023
- Polish Cadet Championship (2009)
- Polish Basketball League Bronze Medalist:
  - 2012
- Finalist:
  - Polish Cup: 2021
  - Polish SuperCup: 2017
- Eurocup participant: 2012/2013

=== Individual ===
- MVP of the TBL/EBL round:
  - Round 28 – 2015/2016
  - Round 16 – 2019/2020
  - Round 12 – 2020/2021
  - Round 15 – 2022/2023
- Selected to the EBL All-Round First Team:
  - Round 12 – 2020/2021
  - Round 27 – 2020/2021
  - Round 15 – 2022/2023
- Polish Cadet Championship All-Tournament Team (2009)
- Leading scorer of the Polish U-20 Championship (2011)

=== National team ===
- FIBA U-17 World Championship Silver Medalist (2010)
- FIBA U-20 European Championship Division B Gold Medalist (2013 – promoted to Division A)
- Participant in the European Championships:
  - U-16 (2009 – 4th place)
  - U-18 (2011 – 6th place)
- Olimpic Games 2024 3x3
