= Miguel Cardoso (basketball) =

Portuguese basketball player (born 1993)

Free Agent
- Position: Point guard

Personal information
- Born: 15 January 1993 (age 33)
- Listed height: 185 cm (6 ft 1 in)
- Listed weight: 80 kg (176 lb)

Career information
- Playing career: 2010–present

Career history
- 2010–2012: FC Porto
- 2012–2014: JSF Nanterre
- 2014–2015: UJAP Quimper 29
- 2015–2016: Berck/Rang Du Fliers
- 2017–2018: Vitória de Guimarães
- 2018–2019: Benfica
- 2019–2020: Almansa
- 2020–2021: Valur
- 2021–2022: Sporting CP
- 2022–2026: FC Porto

Career highlights
- Portuguese League champion (2011); French League champion (2013); French Cup winner (2014); 4× Portuguese Cup winner (2012, 2022, 2024, 2025); Portuguese League Cup winner (2022); 3× Portuguese Supercup winner (2011, 2021, 2024)

Miguel Cardoso (born 15 January 1993) is a Portuguese basketball player who last played for FC Porto of the Liga Portuguesa de Basquetebol and the Portuguese national team. During his career, he has played in Portugal, France and in the EuroLeague.

== Club career ==
Cardoso started his career with FC Porto in 2010.

In October 2020, Cardoso signed with Úrvalsdeild karla club Valur. He appeared in 26 games for Valur during the season, averaging 16.2 points and 5.3 assists.

Before the 2021–22 season he joined Sporting Clube de Portugal of the Liga Portuguesa de Basquetebol.
