= Gaussberg =

Volcanic cone in Antarctica

- Gaussberg in 1912

Highest point
- Elevation: 373 m (1,224 ft)
- Listing: List of volcanoes in Antarctica
- Coordinates: 66°48′S 089°11′E

Geography
- Location within Antarctica
- Location: Antarctica

Geology
- Mountain type: Volcanic cone

Gaussberg (or Schwarzen Berg, Mount Gauss) is a 370-metre-high (1,210-foot) extinct volcanic cone in East Antarctica fronting on Davis Sea immediately west of Posadowsky Glacier. It is ice-free and conical in nature, having formed subglacially about 55,000 years ago. The current edifice is thought to be the remains of a once-larger mountain that has been reduced by glacial and subaerial erosion. The volcano has produced lamproite magmas, and is the youngest volcano to have produced such magmas on Earth.

== Research history ==
Discovered in February 1902 by the German Antarctic Expedition under Erich von Drygalski, who named it after his expedition ship which in 1902 remained stuck in ice for a year. The ship in turn was named in honour of the German mathematician Carl Friedrich Gauss. Drygalski observed the volcano with the help of a tethered balloon.

Owing to its peculiar composition, Gaussberg has been intensively researched. The mountain was investigated in 1912 by the 1911-1914 Australasian Antarctic Expedition, by the Soviet Antarctic Expedition in 1956–1957, by Australian expeditions in 1977, 1981, 1987 and by an expedition linked to an entity "K.D.C" in 1997. Regional krill stocks in turn were named after the mountain. Owing to its peculiar composition and isolated location, the volcano has an importance out of proportion to its actual size. The mineral gaussbergite is named after the volcano.

== Geography and geomorphology ==
The volcano lies in Kaiser Wilhelm II Land, Antarctica, close to the West Ice Shelf and between the Australian Davis Station and Russian Mirny Station. It lies on the Davis Sea immediately west of Posadowsky Glacier. Gaussberg is within the Antarctic territory claimed by Australia, and the only ice-free outcrop between Mirny Station and the Vestfold Hills.

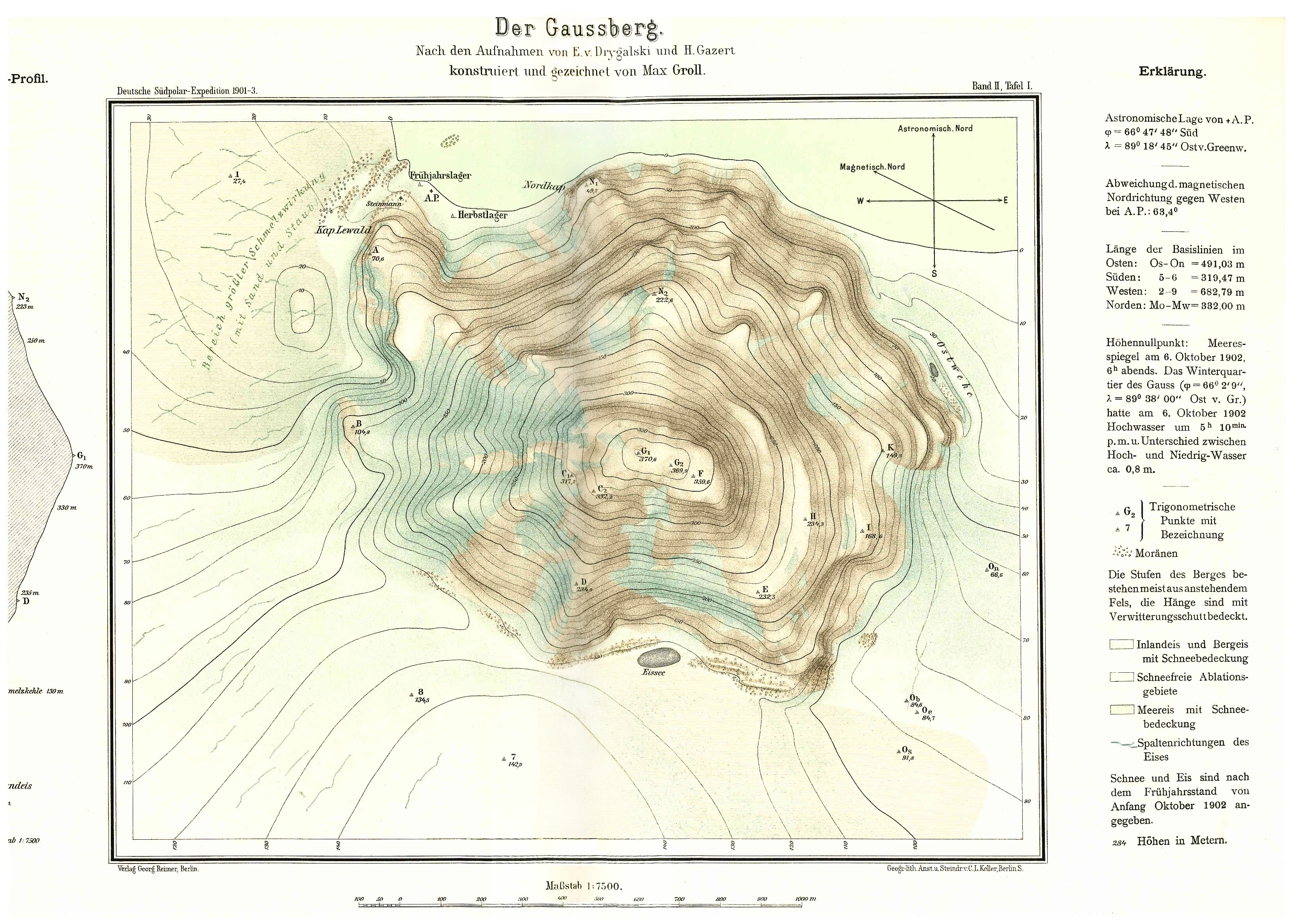
German map of Gaussberg

It consists of a 370-metre-high (1,210-foot), 1.5-kilometre-wide (0.93-mile) cone located between the East Antarctic Ice Sheet on three sides and the sea on the fourth. It is the only exposure of rock in the region, with rocky outcrops at the summit and on the northern flank. The edifice covers an area of about 10 square kilometres (3.9 sq mi) and has a volume of 1 cubic kilometre (0.24 cu mi). Most of the edifice is made out of pillow lavas with radii of 0.5–2 metres (1 ft 8 in – 6 ft 7 in) and 3–5 centimetres (1.2–2.0 in) thick crusts. The volcano is covered with lava fragments resembling lapilli which may have formed through erosion. Gaussberg has no volcanic crater, rather having a ridge at the summit. The volcano has several terraces of undetermined origin and may have formed as a shield volcano with multiple vents. The rocks were probably emplaced subglacially, although the occurrence of pahoehoe lava is possible. There are moraines on the southern, northwestern and northeastern foot of the volcano, and erratic blocks and glacial striations are evidence that the volcano was formerly glaciated.

== Geology ==
Gaussberg is an extremely isolated volcano although an ice rise a few kilometres southwest of Gaussberg and aeromagnetic surveys suggest that within 30 kilometres (19 mi) there are other small volcanoes in the area. It is the only Antarctic volcano situated on the Antarctic Shield, where the thickest crust of Antarctica is found. Why it formed about 50,000 years ago on a stable continental margin is unclear; either a mantle plume, an instability of the East Antarctic continent or lateral flow of mantle plume material are possible. The basement underneath Gaussberg is formed by gneisses of Archean to Proterozoic age. The lithosphere under Gaussberg is over 150 kilometres (93 mi) thick and has an unusually high heat flow.

Its activity has been related to the Kerguelen Plateau, but the Kerguelen volcanoes have yielded different magma compositions and there is no major geological structure linking the two other than the so-called "Kerguelen-Gaussberg Ridge", thus a connection between the two is unproven. A graben system in the region, which may have formed in Gondwana and may be correlated to tectonic structures on the Indian Peninsula, has been christened the "Gaussberg Rift"; the volcano rises on a horst on the rift but its relation to the rift is unclear. Finally, the 90° E Fault that separates regional tectonic structures may have influenced volcanism at Gaussberg.

=== Composition ===
The volcano has a uniform chemical composition consisting of lamproite (originally identified as leucitite), which defines a potassium-rich mafic rock suite. The rocks are almost free of visible crystals but contain numerous vesicles. Phenocrysts include clinopyroxene, leucite and olivine, the latter containing spinel inclusions. The Gaussberg suite is the youngest lamproite known on Earth. The rocks are rich in volatiles including carbon dioxide and water. There are xenoliths, mostly granites coming from the Precambrian basement, and zircons recovered from the rocks are up to several billion years old. Palagonite, salt and native sulfur deposits have been found.

The source of the Gaussberg lamproites is unclear, as the processes usually proposed for the formation of such magmas do not easily apply to the Gaussberg rocks. The magma may have formed through the incomplete melting of phlogopite-rich mantle and further chemical processes such as crystal fractionation that raised the potassium/aluminium ratio above 1. Deep mantle structures that formed through subduction billions of years ago and remained isolated since then have been proposed as the source of Gaussberg lamproites. The Kerguelen plume may or may not have played a role.

== Eruption history ==
Drastically different age estimates have been obtained on Gaussberg. Early research suggested a Pliocene or Miocene age based on a presumed history of the Antarctic Ice Sheet and comparisons between the appearance of Gaussberg with Kerguelen volcanoes. Potassium-argon dating has yielded ages of 20 and 9 million years, with younger dating efforts producing an age of 56,000±5,000 years. Fission track dating produced ages of 25,000±12,000 years and geomorphologic considerations support a late Pleistocene age. These disagreements between potassium-argon dating and other dating methods may indicate either contamination with older rocks or the presence of non-outgassed argon. The 56,000±5,000 years age is considered to be more probable than the 20 and 9 million years ones.

Gaussberg was probably constructed in a single eruptive episode but there is evidence that the present-day edifice formed on an older, eroded volcano. Gaussberg formed under much thicker ice than there is today in the area, and the ice deposited moraines on its summit. There are different views on how erosion affected Gaussberg; some think that it was largely spared and others that erosion wore down the initially much larger edifice to its current size; the latter theory is the preferred view of the Global Volcanism Program and is supported by aeromagnetic data which suggest an initial size of 10 kilometres (6.2 mi). Dust layers in the Siple Dome ice core may come from wind-driven erosion of Gaussberg rocks.

== Biology ==
Several moss species were identified at Gaussberg, as well as a protozoan fauna such as rotifers inhabiting them. Nematodes and tardigrades have been found at Gaussberg. It was the first place on the Antarctic mainland where lichens were reported. Emperor penguin rookeries occur at the mountain and snow petrels were observed to breed there, but overall there is not much fauna at Gaussberg.

== See also ==
- List of volcanoes in Antarctica
