= Leskova =

Leskova Лескова
- Village (Selo)
- Location within Serbia
- Coordinates: 43°03′N 20°10′E
- Country: Serbia
- District: Raška District
- Municipality: Tutin

Area
  - Total: 7.41 km^{2} (2.86 sq mi)
- Elevation: 1,231 m (4,039 ft)

Population (2011)
  - Total: 292
  - Density: 39.4/km^{2} (102/sq mi)
- Time zone: UTC+1 (CET)
  - Summer (DST): UTC+2 (CEST)
- Postal code: 36323

Leskova (Serbian Cyrillic: Лескова) is a village located in the municipality of Tutin, southwestern Serbia. According to the 2011 census, the village has a population of 193 inhabitants.

== History ==
Leskova, like other villages of Tutin, was founded by Albanian fis who moved there from what is today Albania. The elders of the village recount that a blood feud caused their settlement near Tutin. Leskova is the main village of the Upper Pešter plateau. During the early 18th century, the village was noted to have been inhabited by six families and 196 people belonging to Catholic Albanian tribes.

The first windmill generator opened in Serbia is located near Leskova; it was opened in 2011 and has an installed capacity of 600 KW.

Leskova is also a place of a large company for soil production by the name of Treset, whose soil is delivered from Braćak, the village north of Leskova.

Leskova consists of two parts, north, usually considered the part of which the business revolves around farming and keeping animals for profit. The southern part is considered downtown in all of the Pešter plateau.

In southern Leskova, there is a main or elementary school “Dr. Ibrahim Bakić” and is the only elementary school in the area.

== Sources ==
- Velović Popović, Bojana M. (2021). "Морфолошке одлике глаголских облика говора Тутина, Новог Пазара и Сјенице" [Morphological features of verb forms in speech from Tutin, Novi Pazar and Sjenica] (PDF). Српски дијалектолошки зборник (68).
