= Kaiser Wilhelm II Land =

Australian Antarctic claim

Coordinates: 67°0′S 90°0′E

Location of Kaiser Wilhelm II Land (red), Australian Antarctic Territory in Antarctica

Kaiser Wilhelm II Land is a region of East Antarctica, situated between Cape Penck and Cape Filchner, within the sector claimed by Australia as part of the Australian Antarctic Territory. This claim, however, is not universally recognized due to the Antarctic Treaty System, which designates Antarctica for peaceful scientific research and prohibits new territorial assertions. The land was discovered in 1902 during the German Gauss expedition, which was funded by the German Emperor Wilhelm II and was subsequently named in his honor. It is geographically positioned between Princess Elizabeth Land to its west and Queen Mary Land to its east.

The topography of Kaiser Wilhelm II Land is predominantly characterized by the vast Antarctic ice sheet, with elevations gradually increasing towards the interior from the coast. The region's coastal areas support Antarctic wildlife, notably including Adélie penguins, which establish breeding colonies there, alongside various marine species adapted to the extreme polar environment.

== Exploration ==
Kaiser Wilhelm II Land was discovered on 22 February 1902, during the Gauss expedition of 1901–1903 led by Arctic veteran and geologist Erich von Drygalski. Drygalski named it after the German Emperor Wilhelm II, who had funded the expedition with 1.2 million Goldmarks. The expedition also discovered the Gaussberg, a 370-metre-high (1,210 ft) extinct volcano, which was named after mathematician and physicist Carl Friedrich Gauss. During the expedition, Drygalski's ship, the Gauss, became ice-bound, compelling the crew to establish a winter station on the sea ice for 14 months. The expedition conducted extensive scientific research on the ice and undertook sledge journeys inland.

== Geography ==
Kaiser Wilhelm II Land is a sector of Antarctica situated in East Antarctica. It is geographically defined as the region between Cape Penck (approximately 87°43'E) and Cape Filchner (approximately 91°54'E). The area is claimed to be a part of the Australian Antarctic Territory, however, is not universally recognized due to the Antarctic Treaty System, which designates Antarctica for peaceful scientific research and prohibits new territorial assertions. The topography of Kaiser Wilhelm II Land is predominantly characterized by the immense Antarctic ice sheet, which covers the vast majority of the continent. Elevations within the region generally increase as one moves inland from the coast. Gaussberg is a notable topological feature in the region.

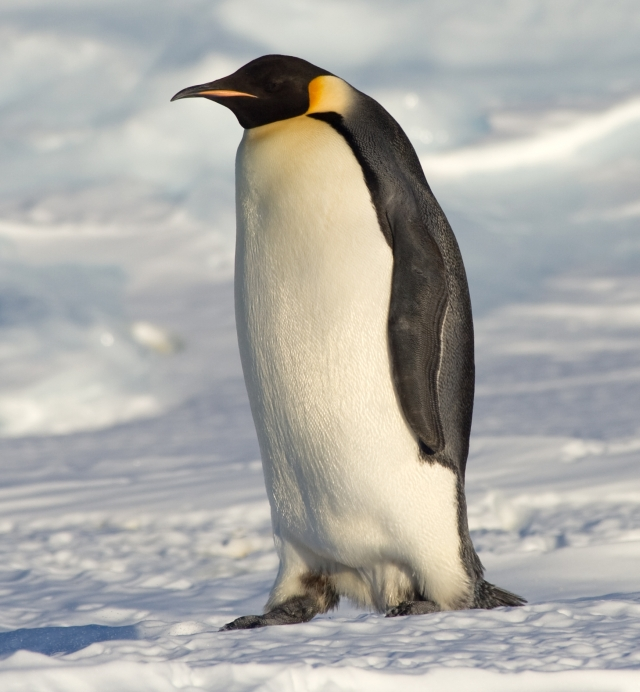
A close-up of an Emperor penguin

Kaiser Wilhelm II Land, being a part of Antarctica, is primarily a site for scientific research, and the Australian Antarctic Territory, which encompasses Kaiser Wilhelm II Land, maintains a seasonal research station. Wildlife found in Kaiser Wilhelm II Land is characteristic of the Antarctic coastal and marine ecosystems. These include Emperor penguins, Adélie penguins, and other aquatic animals.
