= Erich von Drygalski =

German geographer, geophysicist and polar scientist

Erich Dagobert von Drygalski
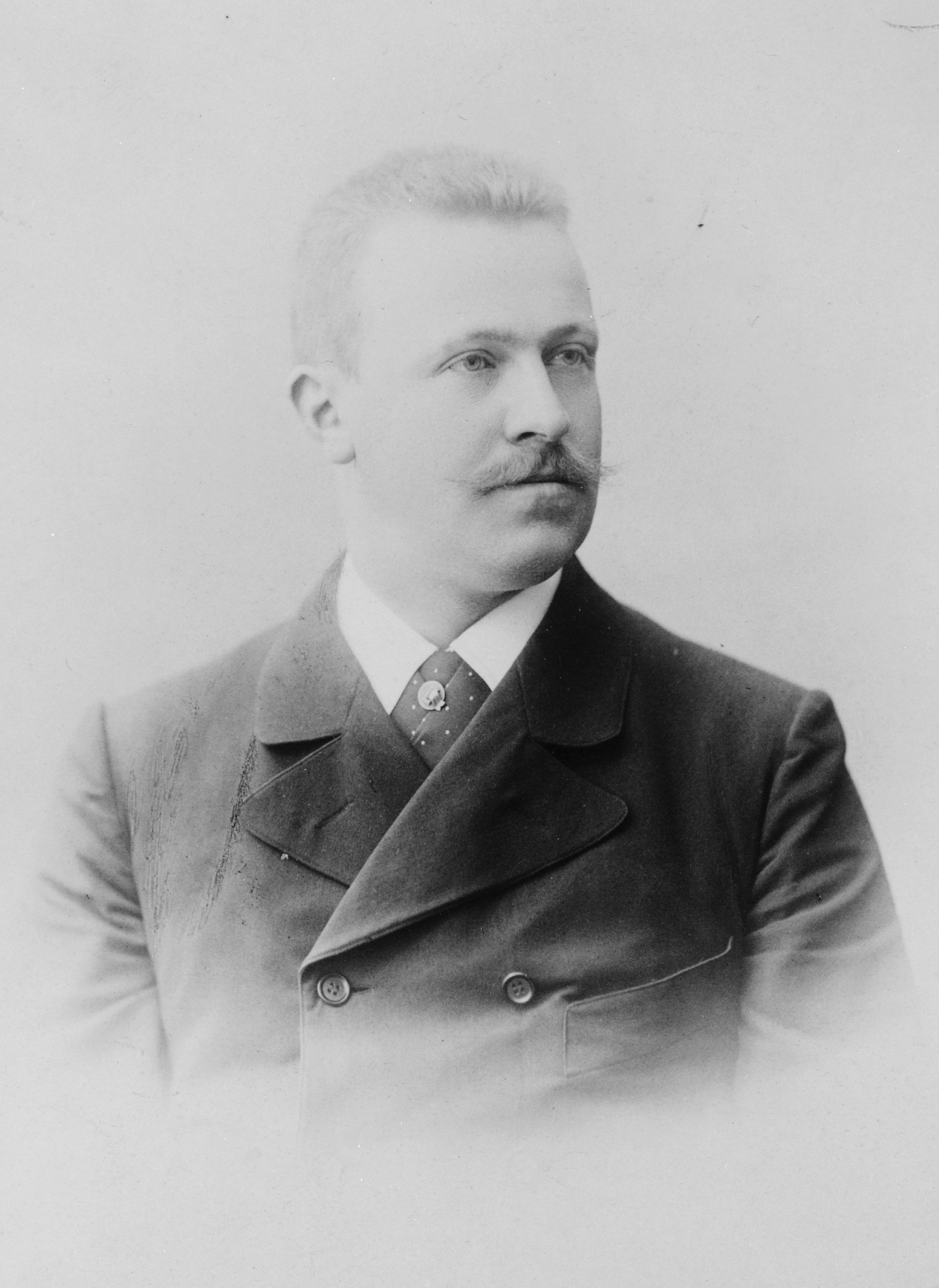
- Pictured c. 1900–1920.
- Born: February 9, 1865; Königsberg, Province of Prussia, Kingdom of Prussia
- Died: January 10, 1949 (aged 83); Munich, American Zone, Allied-occupied Germany
- Occupations: Geographer, Geophysicist, and polar scientist.

Erich Dagobert von Drygalski (German: [ˈeːʁɪç ˈdaːɡobɛʁt fɔn dʁyˈɡalski]; February 9, 1865 – January 10, 1949) was a German geographer, geophysicist and polar scientist, born in Königsberg, East Prussia.

Between 1882 and 1887, Drygalski studied mathematics and natural science at the University of Königsberg, Bonn, Berlin and Leipzig. He graduated with a doctorate thesis about ice shields in Nordic areas. Between 1888 and 1891, he was an assistant at the Geodetic Institute and the Central Office of International Geodetics in Berlin.

Drygalski led two expeditions between 1891 and 1893, which were supplied by the Society for Geoscience of Berlin. One expedition wintered during the winter between 1892 and 1893 in Western Greenland. He habilitated 1889 for geography and geophysics with the collected scientific evidence. In 1898, Drygalski became associate professor and 1899 extraordinary professor for geography and geophysics in Berlin.

== Gauss expedition ==
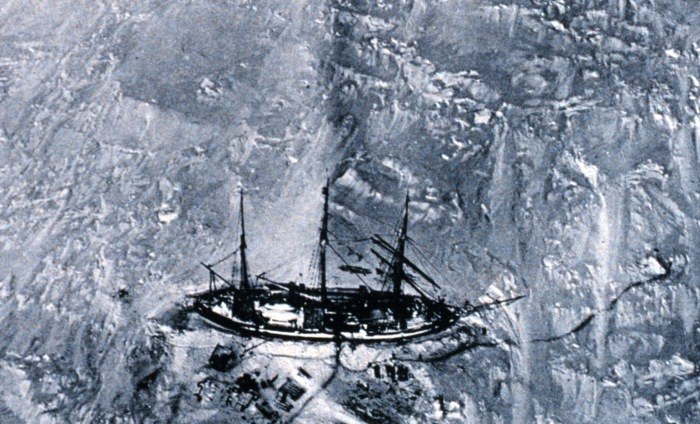
The Gauss enclosed in the ice. Photo taken from a balloon, the first aerial photography in Antarctica

Drygalski led the first German South Polar expedition with the ship Gauss to explore the unknown area of Antarctica lying south of the Kerguelen Islands. The expedition started from Kiel in the summer of 1901. A small party of the expedition was also stationed on the Kerguelen Islands, while the main party proceeded further south. Drygalski also paid a brief call to Heard Island and provided the first comprehensive scientific information on the island's geology, flora and fauna. Despite being trapped by ice for nearly fourteen months until February 1903, the expedition discovered new territory in Antarctica, the Kaiser Wilhelm II Land with the Gaussberg. The expedition arrived back in Kiel in November 1903. Subsequently, Drygalski wrote the narrative of the expedition and edited the voluminous scientific data. Between 1905 and 1931, he published twenty volumes and two atlases documenting the expedition and was awarded the 1933 Royal Geographical Society's Patron's Medal.

== Later years ==
From October 1906 until his retirement, Drygalski was a professor in Munich, where he also presided the Geographic Institute, founded by him, until his death. In 1910, he also took part in Count Ferdinand von Zeppelin's expedition to Spitsbergen and participated in other expeditions to North America and northeastern Asia. He died in 1949 in Munich.

== Trivia ==
Drygalski Island, Drygalski Fjord in South Georgia, and an avenue in the southern part of Munich were named after him, as is the crater Drygalski on the Moon. Two glaciers, including Drygalski Glacier (Antarctica) and Drygalski Glacier (Tanzania) on the slopes of Mount Kilimanjaro are also named for him. An archive at LMU Munich remembers his pioneering efforts. He also has a South African spider named after him, Araneus drygalskii (Strand, 1909), based on material collected on the Gauss expedition.
