= West Ice Shelf =

Ice shelf in East Antarctica

Coordinates: 68°36′29″S 77°53′37″E

Location in Antarctica

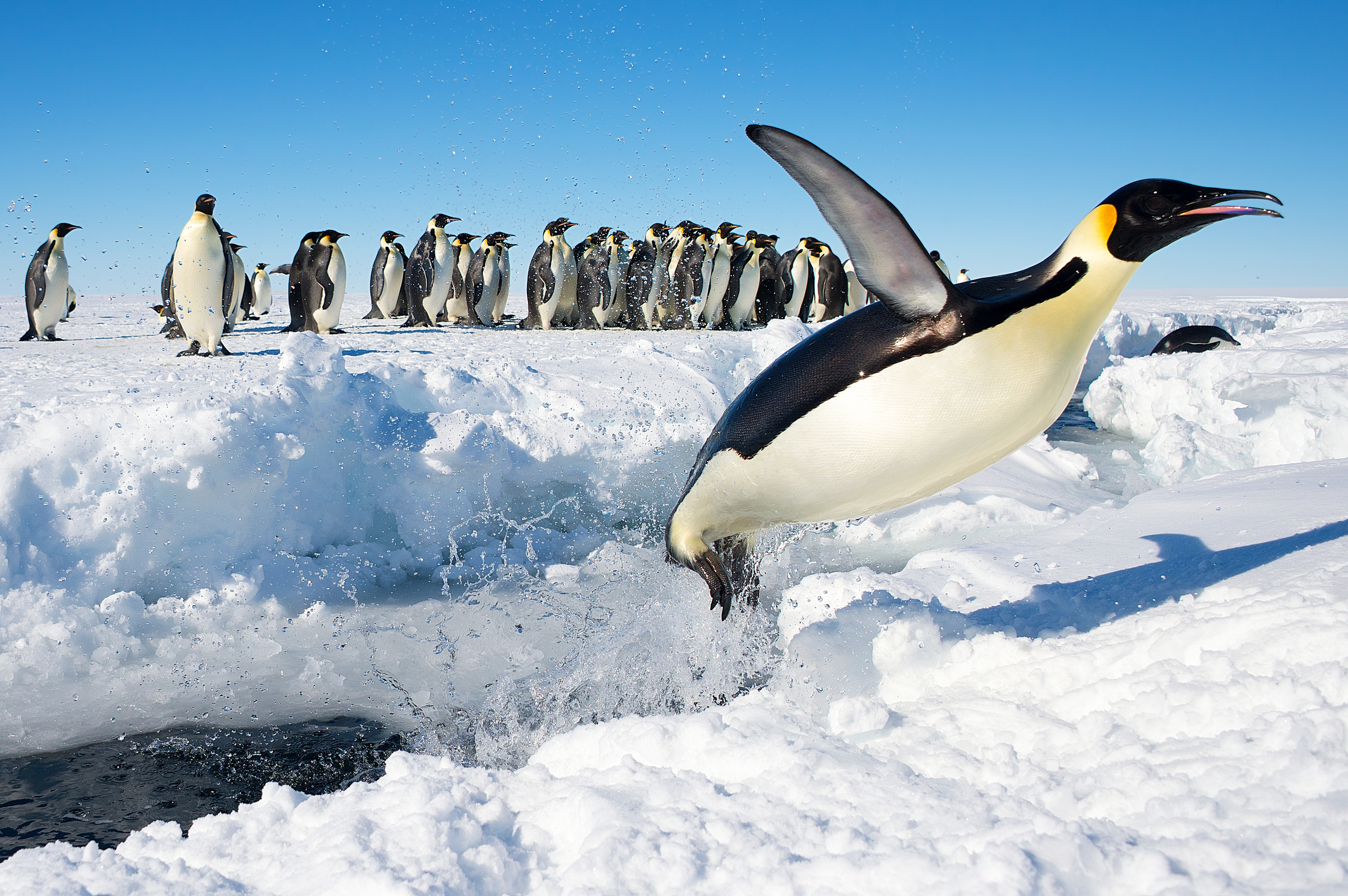
Emperor penguins breed in the IBA

The West Ice Shelf is a prominent ice shelf extending about 350 km (220 mi) in an east–west direction along the Leopold and Astrid Coast in East Antarctica between Barrier Bay and Posadowsky Bay, and up to 120 km northwards from the continental margin.

== Discovery and naming ==
The ice shelf was discovered and named by the First German Antarctica Expedition, 1901–1903, under Dr Erich von Drygalski. The toponym describes the direction in which the German expedition first viewed the ice shelf. Their limited westward view became a prolonged one; on February 21, 1902, the ship became stuck in the pack ice, remaining imprisoned there until February 8, 1903.

== Important Bird Area ==
A 416 ha (1,030 acres) site on sea ice near the north-western margin of the shelf has been designated an Important Bird Area (IBA) by BirdLife International because it supports an emperor penguin colony.

== See also ==
- List of Antarctic ice shelves
